= 2023 Dutch Indoor Athletics Championships =

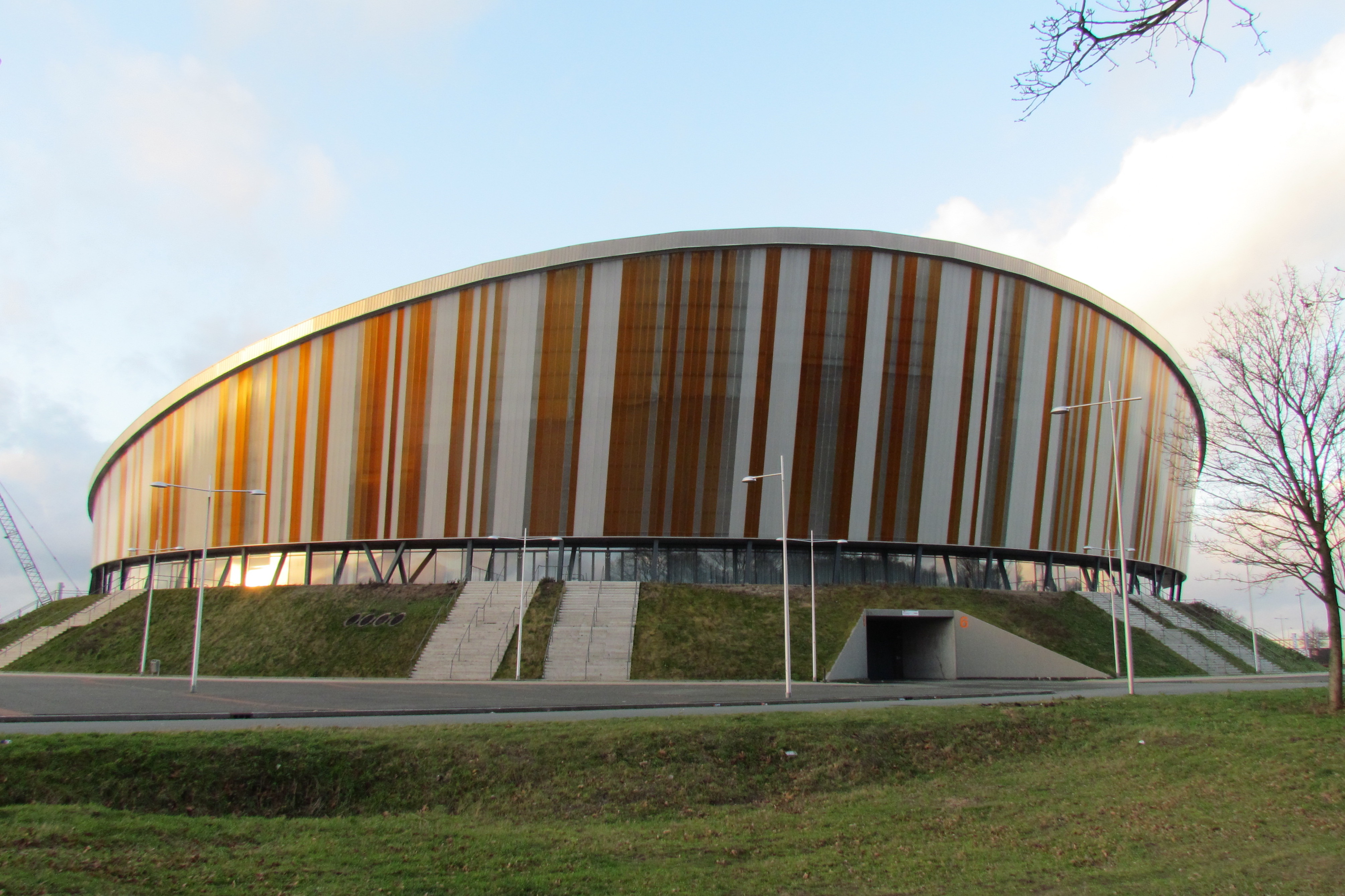
- The host stadium
- Dates: 18–19 February
- Host city: Apeldoorn
- Venue: Omnisport Apeldoorn
- Events: 24

The 2023 Dutch Indoor Athletics Championships (Dutch: Nederlandse kampioenschappen indooratletiek 2023) was the 52nd edition of the national championship in indoor track and field for the Netherlands, organised by the Royal Dutch Athletics Federation. It was held on 18–19 February at the Omnisport Apeldoorn in Apeldoorn. A total of 24 events (divided evenly between the sexes) were contested over the two-day competition.

Femke Bol won the women's 400 metres in a world indoor record of 49.26. Maureen Koster won both the 1500 and 3000 metres. In the high jump competitions, Douwe Amels won his ninth indoor title and Britt Weerman her fourth. Menno Vloon won his fifth title in the pole vault. Shot putters Sven Poelmann and Jessica Schilder won their third and fourth national indoor titles, respectively.

== Results ==
=== Men ===
Event	Gold		Silver		Bronze	
60 metres	Raphael Bouju	6.64	Keitharo Oosterwolde	6.75	Riq de Wit	6.78
200 metres	Cedrych van der Graaff	21.89	Erik Heijink	21.92	Sawa Bezelev	22.16
400 metres	Isayah Boers	45.72	Liemarvin Bonevacia	45.83	Isaya Klein Ikkink	46.28
800 metres	Bram Buigel	1:51.98	Maarten Plaum	1:52.06	Ludo van Nieuwenhuizen	1:52.19
1500 metres	Noah Baltus	3:48.11	Mike Foppen	3:48.30	Robin van Riel	3:48.44
3000 metres	Tim Verbaandert	8:03.23	Mahadi Abdi Ali	8:05.60	Robin van Riel	8:06.15
60 m hurdles	Job Geerds	7.81	Yoram Vriezen	7.87	Timme Koster	7.89
Long jump	David Cairo	7.66 m	Jeff Tesselaar	7.46 m	Sjoerd Pastoor	7.44 m
Triple jump	Alexander Soethout	14.83 m	Favour Abu	14.61 m	Thomas Ticheloven	14.57 m
High jump	Douwe Amels	2.24 m	Ridzerd Punt	2.02 m	Lennert Naeff	1.98 m
Pole vault	Menno Vloon	5.82 m	Rutger Koppelaar	5.50 m	Owen Beuckens	5.05 m
Shot put	Sven Poelmann	19.42 m	Ruben Rolvink	17.42 m	Bjorn Van Kins	17.14 m

=== Women ===
Event	Gold		Silver		Bronze	
60 metres	N'Ketia Seedo	7.18	Nadine Visser	7.22	Demi van den Wildenberg	7.25
200 metres	Leonie Van Vliet	23.49	Myke van de Wiel	23.83	Anna Roelofs	24.50
400 metres	Femke Bol	49.26 WR	Lieke Klaver	50.34	Cathelijn Peeters	53.11
800 metres	Danaïd Prinsen	2:05.85	Suzanne Voorrips	2:07.14	Celine van Heerikhuize	2:08.61
1500 metres	Maureen Koster	4:07.98	Marissa Damink	4:10.88	Jetske van Kampen	4:13.06
3000 metres	Maureen Koster	9:02.37	Veerle Bakker	9:10.16	Jetske van Kampen	9:14.76
60 m hurdles	Marijke Esselink	8.36	Anouk Vetter	8.37	Emma Oosterwegel	8.44
Long jump	Pauline Hondema	6.48 m	Anouk Vetter	6.29 m	Myrte van der Schoot	6.02 m
Triple jump	Maureen Herremans	13.09 m	Danielle Spek	12.60 m	Kellynsia Leerdam	12.48 m
High jump	Britt Weerman	1.90 m	Sofie Dokter	1.84 m	Tanita Hofmans	1.78 m
Pole vault	Noga Piepenbroek	3.90 m	Marijn Kieft	3.80 m	Sanne Rombouts	3.70 m
Shot put	Jessica Schilder	19.22 m	Benthe König	17.69 m	Jaybre Wau	14.10 m
