= 2021 Dutch Indoor Athletics Championships =

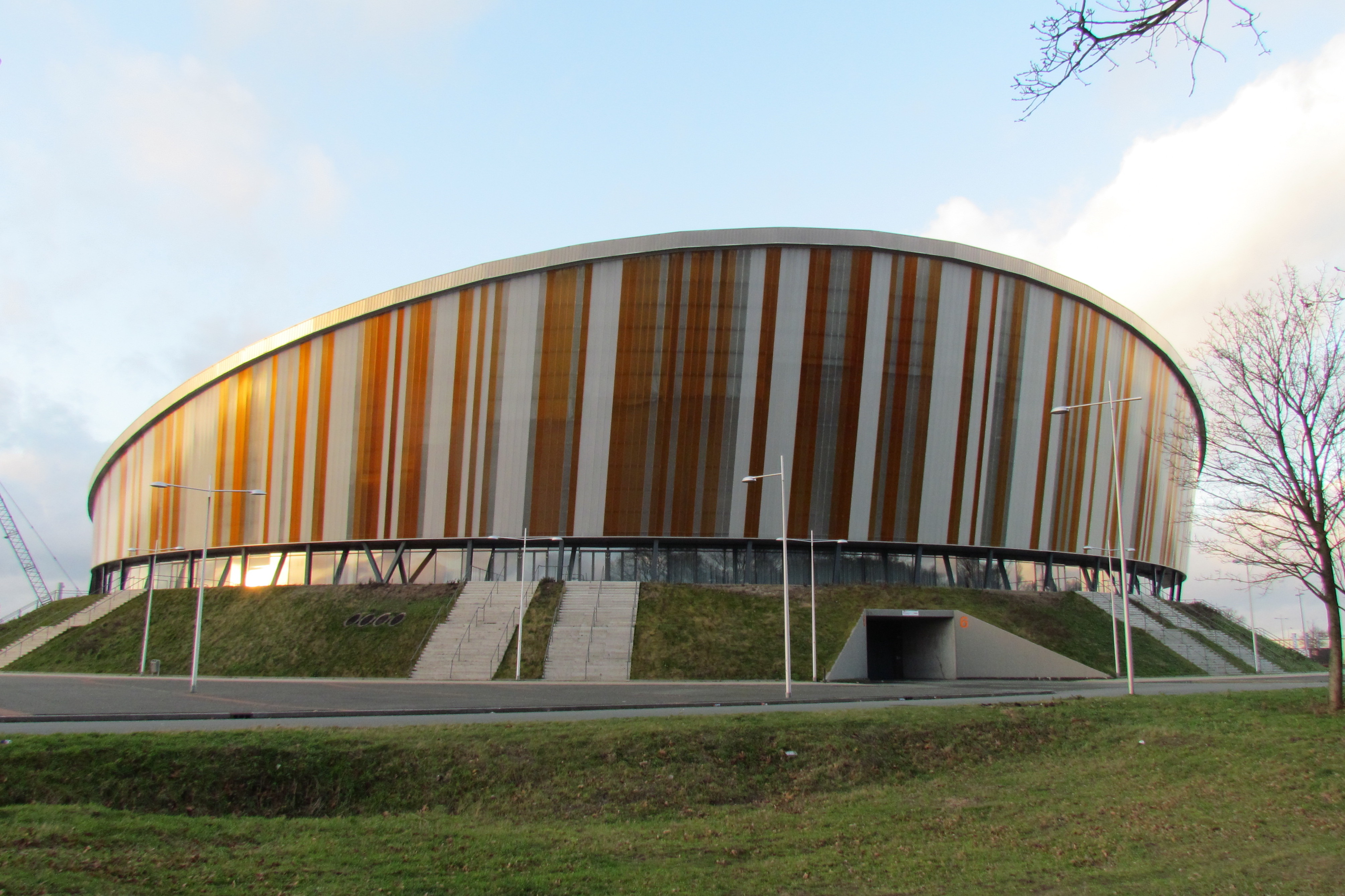
- The host stadium
- Dates: 20–21 February
- Host city: Apeldoorn
- Venue: Omnisport Apeldoorn
- Events: 24

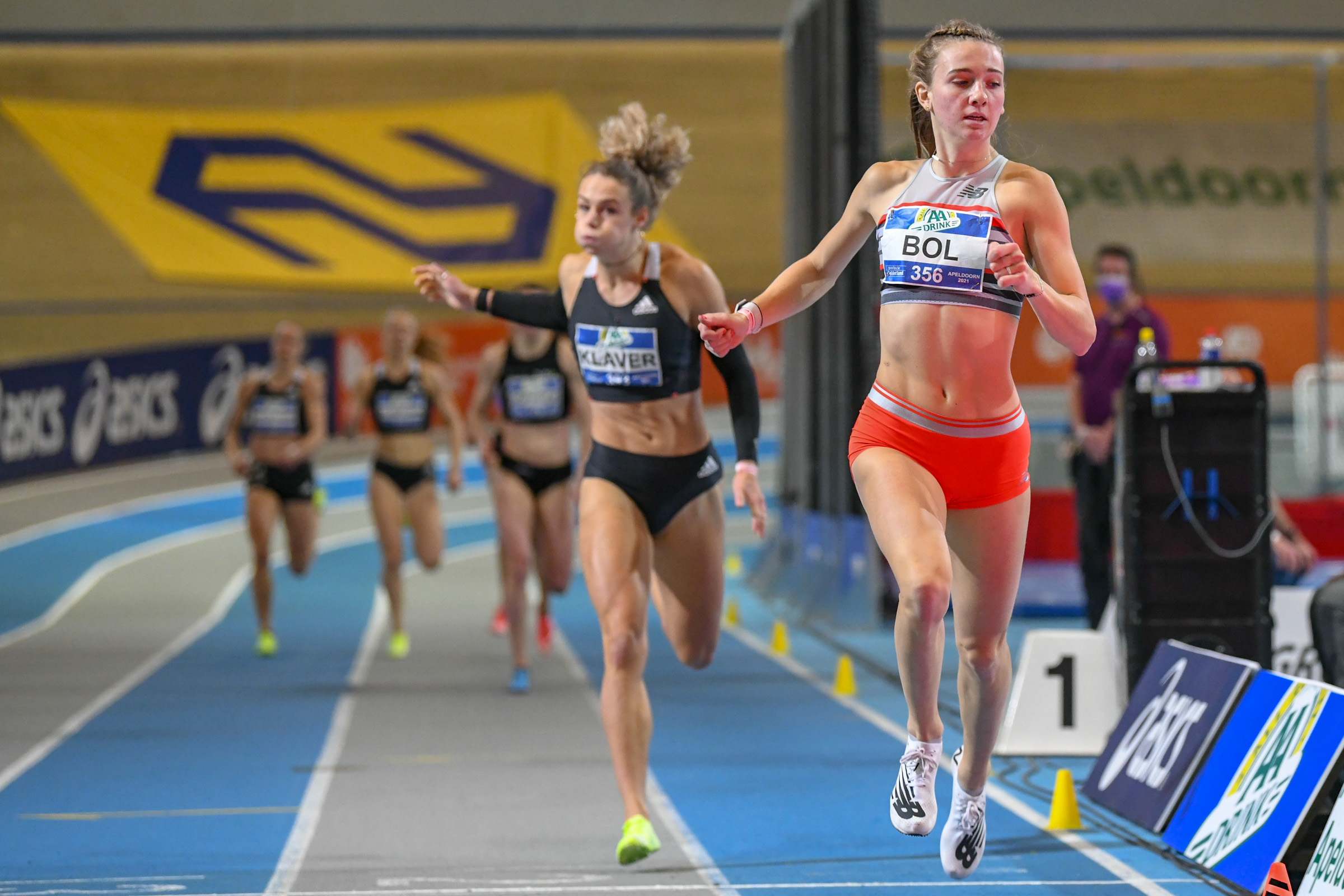
Femke Bol (right) and Lieke Klaver (center) at the finish of the 400 metres

The 2021 Dutch Indoor Athletics Championships (Dutch: Nederlandse kampioenschappen indooratletiek 2021) was the 50th edition of the national championship in indoor track and field for the Netherlands, organised by the Royal Dutch Athletics Federation. It was held on 20–21 February at the Omnisport Apeldoorn in Apeldoorn. A total of 24 events (divided evenly between the sexes) were contested over the two-day competition.

The events were not held before the public due to COVID-19 pandemic restrictions. Two Dutch indoor records for the 400 metres were broken, with Femke Bol running 50.64 seconds for the women' record and Liemarvin Bonevacia breaking the men's with 45.99 seconds.

== Results ==
=== Men ===
Event	Gold		Silver		Bronze	
60 metres	Joris van Gool	6.62	Chris Garia	6.71	Keitharo Oosterwolde	6.81
200 metres	Onyema Adigida	20.90	Keitharo Oosterwolde	21.53	Justin Verheul	21.78
400 metres	Liemarvin Bonevacia	45.99	Tony van Diepen	46.17	Jochem Dobber	46.51
800 metres	Djoao Lobles	1:46.65	Thijmen Kupers	1:47.75	Jurgen Wielart	1:48.16
1500 metres	Bram Anderiessen	3:41.20	Mahadi Abdi Ali	3:41.71	Valentijn Weinans	3:42.79
3000 metres	Mike Foppen	7:52.97	Tim Verbaandert	7:56.52	Filmon Tesfu	8:01.86
60 m hurdles	Koen Smet	7.65	Mark Heiden	8.02	Sven Roosen	8.09
Long jump	Pieter Braun	7.43 m	Damian Felter	7.21 m	David Cairo	7.15 m
Triple jump	Daan Hoomoedt	14.94 m	Tarik Tahiri	14.40 m	Winjaris Windster	14.17 m
High jump	Douwe Amels	2.20 m	Ridzerd Punt	2.07 m	Jamie Sesay	2.07 m
Pole vault	Menno Vloon	5.72 m	Sam Kranse	4.77 m	Owen Beuckens	4.77 m
Shot put	Sven Poelmann	19.34 m	Mattijs Mols	18.72 m	Bjorn Van Kins	16.93 m

=== Women ===
Event	Gold		Silver		Bronze	
60 metres	Naomi Sedney	7.28	Jamile Samuel	7.28	Marije van Hunenstijn	7.38
200 metres	Myke van de Wiel	23.83	Britt de Blaauw	23.94	Minke Bisschops	24.31
400 metres	Femke Bol	50.64	Lieke Klaver	51.21	Marit Dopheide	53.17
800 metres	Britt Ummels	2:05.01	Bregje Sloot	2:05.21	Suus Althof	2:08.76
1500 metres	Anne Knijnenburg	4:26.49	Jetske van Kampen	4:26.65	Lotte Krause	4:27.89
3000 metres	Maureen Koster	8:56.69	Bo Ummels	9:12.95	Diane van Es	9:16.22
60 m hurdles	Nadine Visser	7.90	Zoë Sedney	7.98	Anouk Vetter	8.29
Long jump	Anouk Vetter	6.42 m	Pauline Hondema	6.41 m	Tara Yoro	6.23 m
Triple jump	Daniëlle Spek	12.46 m	Kellynsia leerdam	12.14 m	Nina Borger	11.93 m
High jump	Jeanelle Scheper	1.88 m	Britt Weerman	1.84 m	Melissa de Haan	1.78 m
Pole vault	Fleur van der Linden	4.01 m	Kristina Tergau	3.71 m	Sanne Eekel	3.56 m
Shot put	Jessica Schilder	18.19 m	Melissa Boekelman	17.00 m	Benthe König	16.98 m
