= 2020 Dutch Indoor Athletics Championships =

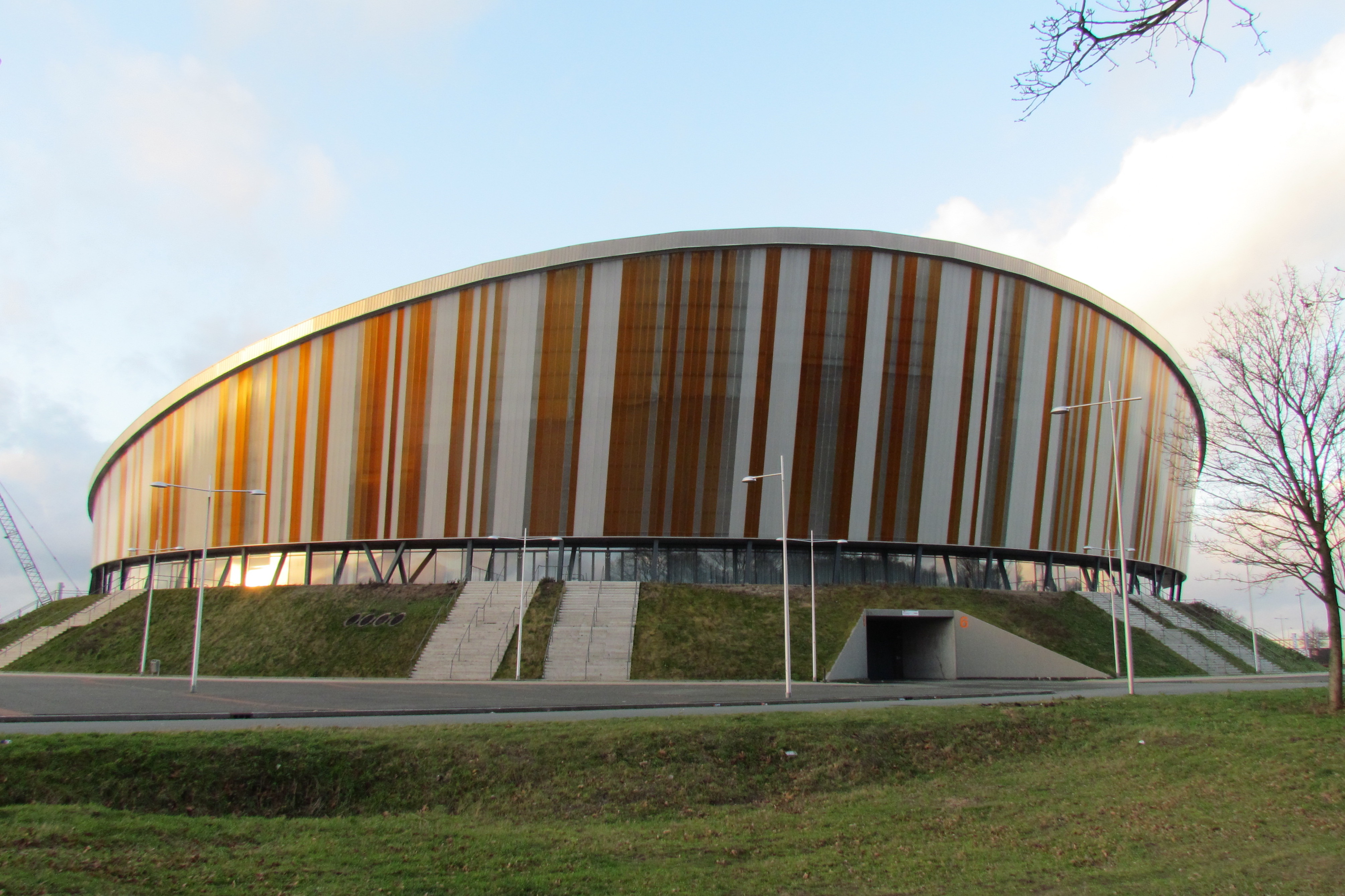
- The host stadium
- Dates: 22–23 February
- Host city: Apeldoorn
- Venue: Omnisport Apeldoorn
- Events: 24

The 2020 Dutch Indoor Athletics Championships (Dutch: Nederlandse kampioenschappen indooratletiek 2020) was the 49th edition of the national championship in indoor track and field for the Netherlands, organised by the Royal Dutch Athletics Federation. It was held on 22–23 February at the Omnisport Apeldoorn in Apeldoorn. A total of 24 events (divided evenly between the sexes) were contested over the two-day competition.

== Results ==
=== Men ===
Event	Gold		Silver		Bronze	
60 metres	Joris van Gool	6.62	Raphael Bouju	6.70	Hensley Paulina	6.72
200 metres	Onyema Adigida	20.90	Sawa Bezelev	22.23	Victor Strijbis	22.27
400 metres	Tony van Diepen	46.44	Terrence Agard	46.84	Jochem Dobber	46.85
800 metres	Djoao Lobles	1:50.23	Maarten Plaum	1:50.33	Ludo Van Nieuwenhuizen	1:51.52
1500 metres	Robin van Riel	3:50.53	Jaap Gerben Gerben Vellinga	3:50.90	Jelmer van der Linden	3:51.65
3000 metres	Mike Foppen	7:54.85	Noah Schutte	7:56.46	Stan Niesten	8:01.37
60 m hurdles	Liam van der Schaaf	7.85	Koen Smet	7.89	Paul Groen	8.18
Long jump	Antonny Ediagbonya	7.33 m	Dudley Boeldak	7.27 m	Sven Jansons	7.20 m
Triple jump	Fabian Florant	15.36 m	Tarik Tahiri	14.79 m	Thomas Ticheloven	14.37 m
High jump	Douwe Amels	2.15 m	Sven van Merode	2.10 m	Marius Wouters	2.05 m
Pole vault	Rutger Koppelaar	5.75 m NR=	Menno Vloon	5.60 m	Léon Mak	5.10 m
Shot put	Mattijs Mols	18.80 m	Patrick Cronie	18.71 m	Sven Poelmann	17.09 m

=== Women ===
Event	Gold		Silver		Bronze	
60 metres	N'ketia Seedo	7.24	Naomi Sedney	7.28	Nadine Visser	7.30
200 metres	Lisanne de Witte	23.86	Kadene Vassell	23.91	Leonie van Vliet	24.15
400 metres	Lieke Klaver	52.45	Femke Bol	52.78	Eveline Saalberg	53.65
800 metres	Suzanne Voorrips	2:07.47	Sanne Verstegen	2:08.20	Marissa Damink	2:08.60
1500 metres	Britt Ummels	4:24.69	Lotte Krause	4:25.57	Jetske van Kampen	4:25.99
3000 metres	Britt Ummels	9:15.08	Julia van Velthoven	9:15.92	Lotte Krause	9:29.51
60 m hurdles	Nadine Visser	8.06	Zoë Sedney	8.18	Anouk Vetter	8.46
Long jump	Tara Yoro	6.19 m	Anouk Vetter	6.11 m	Pauline Hondema	6.03 m
Triple jump	Daniëlle Spek	12.65 m	Meruska Eduarda	12.50 m	Louise Taatgen	12.48 m
High jump	Jeanelle Scheper	1.90 m	Britt Weerman	1.88 m	Glenka Antonia	1.78 m
Pole vault	Femke Pluim	4.45 m	Killiana Heymans	4.25 m	Marijke Wijnmaalen	3.85 m
Shot put	Jessica Schilder	17.61 m	Melissa Boekelman	17.39 m	Benthe König	16.75 m
