= Cathelijn Peeters =

Dutch track and field athlete

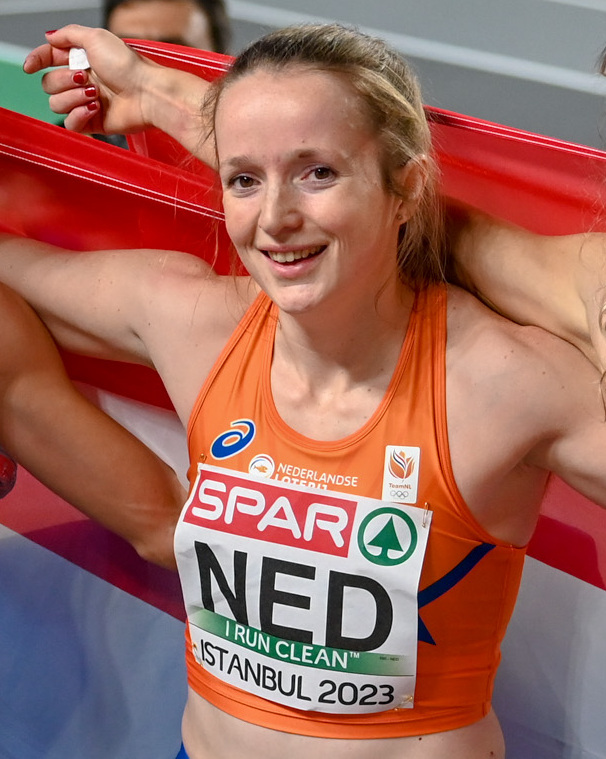
- Peeters at the 2023 European Indoor Championships in Istanbul

Personal information
- Born: 6 November 1996 (age 29) Dongen, Netherlands
- Height: 1.79 m (5 ft 10 in)

Sport
- Sport: Track and field
- Events: 400 m, 400 m hurdles, 4 × 400 m relay
- Club: Prins Hendrik

Achievements and titles
- Highest world ranking: No. 11 (400 mH, 2024); No. 77 (400 m, 2024); No. 217 (overall, 2025)
- Personal bests: 400 m: 51.08 s (2024); 400 m sh: 51.56 s i (2025); 400 mH: 54.31 s (2024)
Medal record
Women's athletics
Representing the Netherlands
Olympic Games
Gold medal – first place	2024 Paris	4 × 400 m mixed
Silver medal – second place	2024 Paris	4 × 400 m relay
World Championships
Gold medal – first place	2023 Budapest	4 × 400 m relay
World Indoor Championships
Gold medal – first place	2024 Glasgow	4 × 400 m relay
European Championships
Gold medal – first place	2024 Rome	4 × 400 m relay
Bronze medal – third place	2024 Rome	400 m hurdles
European Indoor Championships
Gold medal – first place	2023 Istanbul	4 × 400 m relay
Gold medal – first place	2025 Apeldoorn	4 × 400 m relay
European Games
Bronze medal – third place	2023 Kraków-Małopolska	400 m hurdles

Cathelijn Peeters (pronounced [ˌkɑtəˈlɛi̯m ˈpeːtərs]; born 6 November 1996) is a Dutch track and field athlete who competes in hurdling and sprinting and previously competed in the combined events and hammer throw. Peeters specializes in the 400 metres hurdles and in the 400 metres. In the 4 × 400 metres relay, she is the 2023 World Champion and the 2024 World Indoor Champion with the Dutch women's team and the 2024 Olympic Champion with the Dutch mixed team.

Individually, Peeters won bronze medals at the 2023 European Games and the 2024 European Championships and five national titles at the Dutch Championships in 2020–2024. As part of the Dutch women's 4 × 400 metres relay team, she won gold medals at the 2023 European Indoor Championships, 2023 World Championships, 2024 World Indoor Championships, and 2024 European Championships and she shares the Dutch records outdoor and indoor. As part of the Dutch mixed 4 × 400 metres relay team, she won a gold medal at the 2024 Summer Olympics.

Peeters' highest World Athletics Rankings were No. 11 in the 400 metres hurdles in 2024, No. 77 in the 400 metres in 2024, and No. 233 of women overall in 2024. With the Dutch women's 4 × 400 metres relay team, she won the Dutch Sports Team of the Year award in 2023.

== Early life ==
Cathelijn Peeters was born on 6 November 1996 in Dongen, Netherlands, where she also grew up. Her cousin Silke Peeters is also a national level hurdler.

== Senior career ==
=== 2015–2023 ===
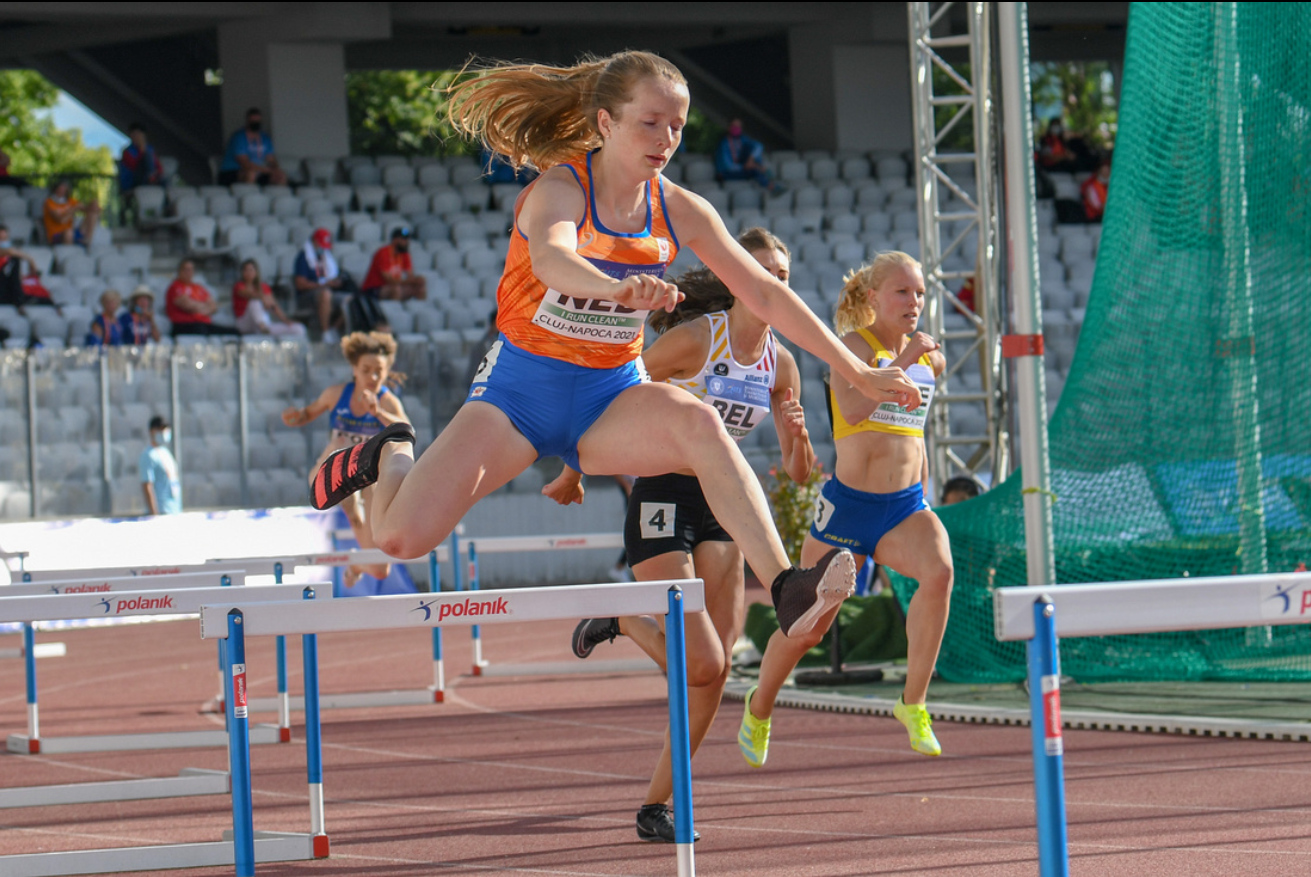
Peeters (center) at the 2021 European Team Championships in Cluj-Napoca, Romania

Peeters competed in the combined events until 2020 and in the hammer throw until 2021. After 2021, she specialized only in hurdling and sprinting.

Peeters reached the national podium for the first time at the 2019 Dutch Championships, taking third place in the hurdles. She followed this with wins at the national championships in 2020, 2021, 2022 and 2023.

She set a personal best of 53.34 seconds for the 400 metres, gaining selection for the Dutch relay team at the 2022 World Athletics Championships. During the heats of the women's 4 × 400 m relay Peeters dropped the baton, causing the team to be eliminated.

She was a gold medallist in the 4 × 400 metres relay at the 2023 European Athletics Indoor Championships, helping break the Dutch record and championship record with a time of 3:25.66 minutes alongside Femke Bol, Lieke Klaver and Eveline Saalberg. On 27 August 2023, the Dutch team continued the success with a gold medal in the women's 4 × 400 metres relay at the 2023 World Championships in Budapest, Hungary. Peeters won the Dutch Sports Team of the Year award with the Dutch women's 4 × 400 metres relay team in 2023.

=== 2024 ===
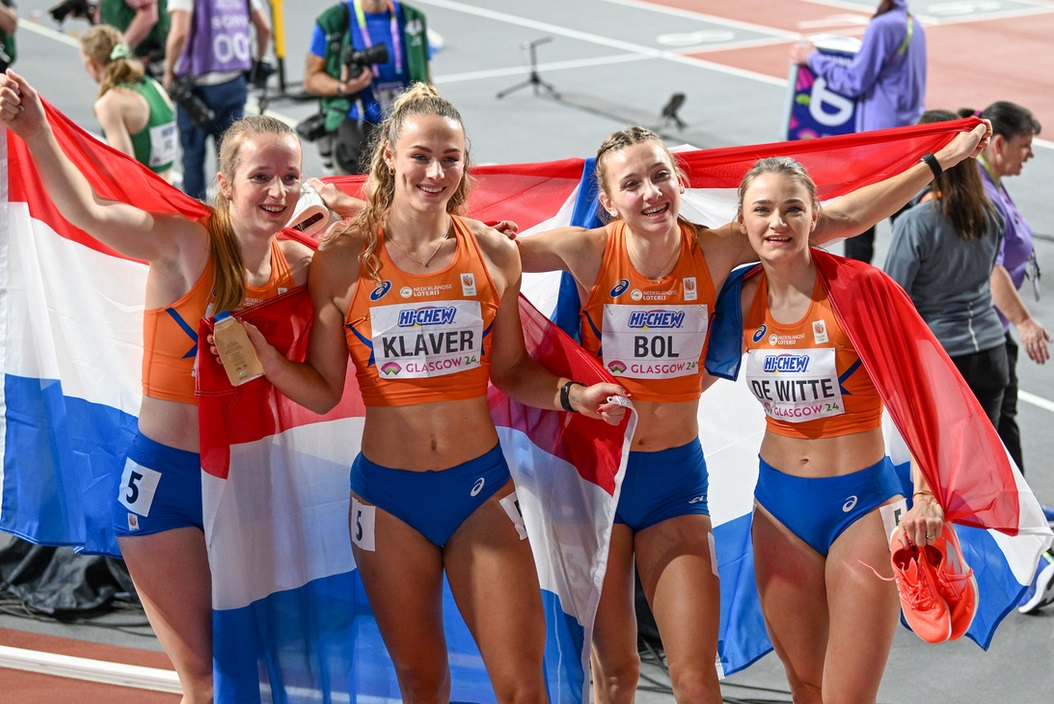
Peeters (left) with Lieke Klaver, Femke Bol, and Lisanne de Witte after winning the 4 × 400 m relay final at the 2024 World Indoor Championships in Glasgow, United Kingdom

On 3 February, she won the 400 m short track in 52.51 s i at the IFAM Indoor Meeting in Ghent, Belgium. On 17 February, she improved her personal best in the 400 m short track to 52.01 s i in the heats of the 2024 Dutch Indoor Championships in Apeldoorn, Netherlands. On 3 March, she ran the second leg of the 4 × 400 m relay short track, where she won a gold medal with Lieke Klaver, Lisanne de Witte, and Femke Bol of the Dutch women's relay team at the 2024 World Indoor Championships in Glasgow, United Kingdom.

On 28 April, she improved her personal best in the 400 m to 51.08 s at the SprintFest in Willemstad, Curaçao. On 4–5 May, she competed in the 4 × 400 metres relay at the 2024 World Athletics Relays in Nassau, Bahamas. With the Dutch women's team, she qualified for the 2024 Paris Olympics in the second qualification round in 3:27.45 min. On 26 May, she won the 400 m hurdles in a new personal best time of 54.32 s at the IFAM Outdoor Meeting in Brussels, Belgium. On 28 May, she won the 400 m hurdles in 54.31 s, further improving her personal best at the Golden Spike Ostrava in Ostrava, Czech Republic.

On 10–12 June, Peeters competed at the 2024 European Championships in Rome, Italy. In the 400 m hurdles, she won a bronze medal finishing in 54.37 s after Femke Bol and Louise Maraval. In the women's 4 × 400 m relay, she won a gold medal with Klaver, De Witte, and Bol in 3:22.39 min, where she ran the second leg in a split time of 50.96 s.

== Personal bests ==
Information from her World Athletics profile unless otherwise noted.

=== Individual events ===
Personal best results for individual events
Event	Result	Venue	Date	Notes
100 metres	11.99 s	Tilburg, Netherlands	18 August 2024	(Wind: 1.0 m/s)
200 metres	23.89 s	Tilburg, Netherlands	18 August 2024	(Wind: 1.4 m/s)
200 metres short track	24.25 s i	Dortmund, Germany	6 January 2024	
300 metres	44.63 s i	Ghent, Belgium	2 January 2016	
300 metres short track	44.63 s i	Ghent, Belgium	2 January 2016	
400 metres	51.08 s	Willemstad, Curaçao	28 April 2024	
400 metres short track	51.56 s i	Apeldoorn, Netherlands	23 February 2025	
800 metres	2:17.38 min i	Ghent, Belgium	11 January 2020	
800 metres short track	2:17.38 min i	Ghent, Belgium	11 January 2020	
60 metres hurdles	8.83 s i	Ghent, Belgium	26 December 2021	
100 metres hurdles	14.11 s	Antwerp, Belgium	21 August 2021	(Wind: +0.4 m/s)
200 metres hurdles	28.63 s	Utrecht, Netherlands	9 August 2019	(Wind: +0.5 m/s)
400 metres hurdles	54.31 s	Ostrava, Czech Republic	28 May 2024	
High jump	1.59 m	Gemert, Netherlands	1 June 2019	
Long jump	5.23 m	Eindhoven, Netherlands	15 July 2018	(Wind: +1.7 m/s)
Shot put	10.45 m i	Apeldoorn, Netherlands	3 February 2019	
Hammer throw	45.80 m	Bergen op Zoom, Netherlands	7 August 2021	
Javelin throw	27.99 m	Gemert, Netherlands	2 June 2019	

==== Season's bests ====
Year	400 m	400 m indoor	400 m hurdles
2013	–	–	71.10
2014	–	–	67.99
2015	–	–	–
2016	–	62.25 i	67.19
2017	61.01	60.57 i	65.24
2018	–	59.31 i	62.53
2019	57.37	58.21 i	59.80
2020	57.94	56.78 i	60.25
2021	56.50	55.76 i	58.17
2022	53.34	53.56 i	56.03
2023	51.73	52.94 i	54.56
2024	**51.08**	52.01 i	**54.31**
2025	52.52	**51.56** i	55.85

Key: Lifetime best (in bold)

=== Combined events ===
Personal best results for combined events
Event	Result	Venue	Date
Heptathlon	4772 pts	Gemert, Netherlands	2 June 2019
Heptathlon	100m H / High jump / Shot put / 200m / Long jump / Javelin / 800m; 15.08 s (+0.4 m/s) / 1.59 m / 10.18 m / 25.80 s (+1.5 m/s) / 5.19 m (+1.3 m/s) / 27.99 m / 2:20.98 min		
Pentathlon short track	3447 pts i	Apeldoorn, Netherlands	3 February 2019
Pentathlon short track	60m H / High jump / Shot put / Long jump / 800m; 9.35 s i / 1.55 m i / 10.45 m i / 4.98 m i / 2:20.40 min i		

=== Team events ===
Personal best results for team events
Type	Event	Time m:s	Venue	Date	Record	Notes
Women's	4 × 400 metres relay	3:19.50	Paris, France	10 August 2024	NR	Teamed with Lieke Klaver, Lisanne de Witte and Femke Bol. Peeters' split time for the second leg was 50.43 seconds.
Women's	4 × 400 metres relay short track	3:25.07 i	Glasgow, United Kingdom	3 March 2024	NR	Third national team of all time. Teamed with Lieke Klaver, Lisanne de Witte, and Femke Bol. Peeters' split time for the second leg was 51.99 s.
Mixed	4 × 400 metres relay	3:10.81	Paris, France	2 August 2024		Teamed with Eugene Omalla, Lieke Klaver, Isaya Klein Ikkink. Peeters' split time for the anchor leg was 50.19 seconds.

== Competition results ==
Information from her World Athletics profile unless otherwise noted.

=== World Athletics Rankings ===
Highest overall and event World Athletics Rankings per year.

Year	200 m	400 m	100 m hurdles	400 m hurdles	Heptathlon	Overall
2019	—N/a	1591	—N/a	304	574	5930
2020	—N/a	1300	—N/a	321	**568**	5716
2021	—N/a	967	910	140	594	2776
2022	**1556**	304	**907**	62	—N/a	1198
2023	—N/a	126	—N/a	19	—N/a	366
2024	—N/a	**77**	—N/a	**11**	—N/a	225
2025	—N/a	—N/a	—N/a	12	—N/a	**214**

Key: Lifetime best (in bold)

=== International competitions ===
Representing the Netherlands
Year	Competition	Venue	Position	Event	Result	Notes
2022	World Championships	Eugene, United States	—	4 × 400 m relay	DQ	TR24.6
2023	European Indoor Championships	Istanbul, Turkey	1st	4 × 400 m relay	3:25.66	CR NR
2023	European Games	Kraków, Poland	3rd	400 m hurdles	54.97	
2023	European Team Championships (1st Division)	Kraków, Poland	3rd	400 m hurdles	54.97	
2023	World Championships	Budapest, Hungary	14th (sf)	400 m hurdles	54.63	
2023	World Championships	Budapest, Hungary	1st	4 × 400 m relay	3:20.72	NR
2024	World Indoor Championships	Glasgow, United Kingdom	1st	4 × 400 m relay	3:25.07	NR
2024	World Relays	Nassau, Bahamas	10th (r1)	4 × 400 m relay	3:28:10	
2024	European Championships	Rome, Italy	3rd	400 m hurdles	54.37	
2024	European Championships	Rome, Italy	1st	4 × 400 m relay	3:22.39	(50.96 split)
2024	Olympic Games	Paris, France	1st	4 × 400 m mixed	3:10.81	(50.19 split) (Note: Time and split from the heat in round 1; Peeters was replaced in the final in which Dutch team had a time of 3:07.43 min.)
2024	Olympic Games	Paris, France	19th (sf)	400 m hurdles	55.20	
2024	Olympic Games	Paris, France	2nd	4 × 400 m relay	3:19.50	NR (50.43 split)
2025	European Indoor Championships	Apeldoorn, Netherlands	12th (sf)	400 m	53.21	
2025	European Indoor Championships	Apeldoorn, Netherlands	1st	4 × 400 m relay	3:24.34	

=== Circuit performances ===
Grand Slam Track results
Slam	Race group	Event	Pl.	Time	Prize money
2025 Kingston Slam	Long hurdles	400 m hurdles	5th	55.85	US$20,000
2025 Kingston Slam	Long hurdles	400 m	5th	52.52	US$20,000

==== Wins and titles ====
- World Athletics Continental Tour

400 metres hurdles wins, times (in seconds) specified in parentheses:

- 2024 (2): Brussels International Flanders Athletics Meeting Outdoor (54.32), Ostrava Golden Spike (54.31)

- World Athletics Indoor Tour

400 metres short track wins, times (in seconds) specified in parentheses:

- 2024 (1): Ghent International Flanders Athletics Meeting Indoor (52.59 i)

=== National championships ===
Year	Competition	Venue	Position	Event	Time
2017	Dutch Championships	Utrecht	6th in heats	400 m hurdles	1:07.60
2018	Dutch Indoor Combined Events Championships	Apeldoorn	9th	Pentathlon sh	3220 pts i
2018	Dutch Indoor Championships	Apeldoorn	5th in heats	400 m sh	60.46 i
2019	Dutch Indoor Combined Events Championships	Apeldoorn	13th	Pentathlon sh	3447 pts i
2019	Dutch Indoor Championships	Apeldoorn	4th in heats	400 m sh	58.42 i
2019	Dutch Championships	The Hague	3rd	400 m hurdles	59.80
2020	Dutch Indoor Championships	Apeldoorn	3rd in heats	400 m sh	56.78 i
2020	Dutch Championships	Utrecht	1st	400 m hurdles	1:00.32
2020	Dutch Combined Event Championships	Emmeloord	7th	Heptathlon	4706 pts
2021	Dutch Indoor Championships	Apeldoorn	4th in heats	200 m sh	25.96 i
2021	Dutch Indoor Championships	Apeldoorn	4th in heats	400 m sh	57.02 i
2021	Dutch Championships	Breda	1st	400 m hurdles	58.17
2022	Dutch Indoor Championships	Apeldoorn	6th	400 m sh	54.48 i
2022	Dutch Championships	Apeldoorn	1st	400 m hurdles	56.51
2023	Dutch Indoor Championships	Apeldoorn	3rd	400 m sh	53.11 i
2023	Dutch Championships	Breda	1st	400 m hurdles	54.95
2024	Dutch Indoor Championships	Apeldoorn	3rd	400 m sh	52.08 i
2024	Dutch Championships	Hengelo	1st	400 m hurdles	55.24
2025	Dutch Indoor Championships	Apeldoorn	2nd	400 m sh	51.56 i
