= 2022 Dutch Indoor Athletics Championships =

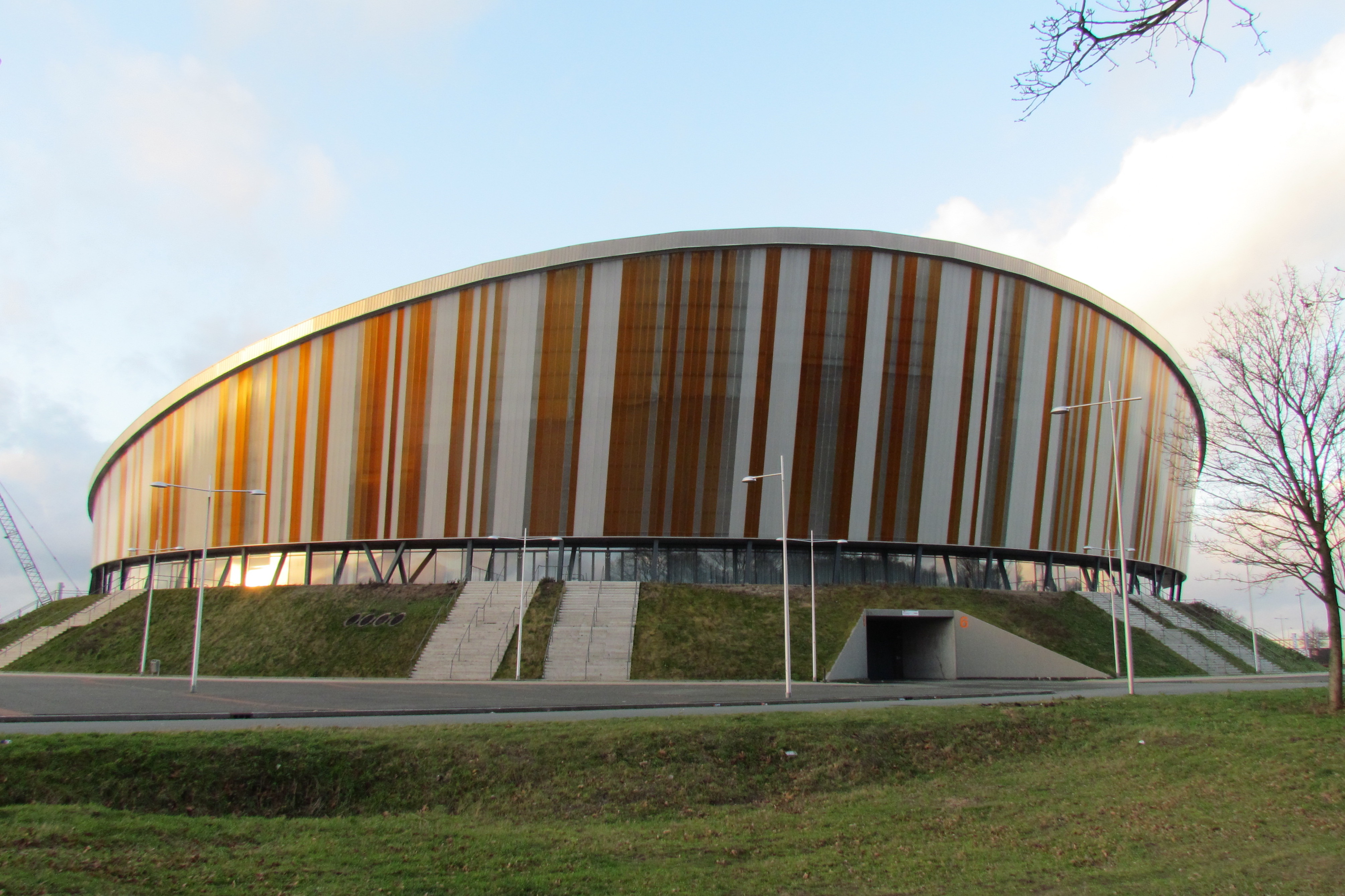
- The host stadium
- Dates: 26–27 February
- Host city: Apeldoorn
- Venue: Omnisport Apeldoorn
- Events: 24

The 2022 Dutch Indoor Athletics Championships (Dutch: Nederlandse kampioenschappen indooratletiek 2022) was the 51st edition of the national championship in indoor track and field for the Netherlands, organised by the Royal Dutch Athletics Federation. It was held on 26–27 February at the Omnisport Apeldoorn in Apeldoorn. A total of 24 events (divided evenly between the sexes) were contested over the two-day competition.

== Results ==
=== Men ===
Event	Gold		Silver		Bronze	
60 metres	Joris van Gool	6.61	Elvis Afrifa	6.70	Raphael Bouju	6.71
200 metres	Xavi Joy Mo-Ajok	21.23	Keitharo Oosterwolde	21.30	Nsikak Ekpo	21.35
400 metres	Liemarvin Bonevacia	45.48 NR	Isayah Boers	46.38	Tony van Diepen	46.88
800 metres	Samuel Chapple	1:50.23	Jurgen Wielart	1:50.25	Kevin Viezee	1:50.35
1500 metres	Tim Verbaandert	3:46.22	Job IJtsma	3:46.52	Noah Baltus	3:47.05
3000 metres	Tim Verbaandert	8:25.29	Yorben Ruiter	8:26.00	Robin Van Riel	8:26.25
60 m hurdles	Koen Smet	7.71	Liam Van der Schaaf	7.80	Job Geerds	7.84
Long jump	Loek van Zevenbergen	7.43 m	Jan Janssen	7.21 m	Damian Felter	7.21 m
Triple jump	Daan Hoomoedt	14.84 m	Favour Abu	14.56 m	Roy van Zijl	14.23 m
High jump	Douwe Amels	2.18 m	Stan Nijhuis	2.10 m	Jamie Sesay	2.06 m
Pole vault	Menno Vloon	5.91 m	Koen van der Wijst	5.40 m	Paulo Benavides	5.30 m
Shot put	Sven Poelmann	19.14 m	Mattijs Mols	18.50 m	Bjorn Van Kins	17.40 m

=== Women ===
Event	Gold		Silver		Bronze	
60 metres	N'Ketia Seedo	7.25	Demi van den Wildenberg	7.33	Naomi Sedney	7.40
200 metres	Leonie Van Vliet	23.53	Myke van de Wiel	23.57	Fréderique Post	24.77
400 metres	Femke Bol	50.30	Lieke Klaver	51.20	Lisanne de Witte	52.65
800 metres	Amina Maatoug	2:04.89	Bregje Sloot	2:05.11	Suzanne Voorrips	2:05.57
1500 metres	Marissa Damink	4:23.89	Jetske van Kampen	4:24.23	Lotte Krause	4:25.68
3000 metres	Lotte Krause	9:21.54	Ineke van Koldam	9:23.03	Jetske van Kampen	9:25.55
60 m hurdles	Zoë Sedney	7.98	Anouk Vetter	8.15	Maayke Tjin A-Lim	8.16
Long jump	Anouk Vetter	6.32 m	Pauline Hondema	6.27 m	Maureen Herremans	6.22 m
Triple jump	Maureen Herremans	13.06 m	Danielle Spek	12.70 m	Sica Verwasch	12.57 m
High jump	Britt Weerman	1.88 m	Sofie Dokter	1.86 m	Glenka Antonia	1.81 m
Pole vault	Marijke Wijnmaalen	4.00 m	Killiana Heymans	4.00 m	Sanne Eekel	3.80 m
Shot put	Jessica Schilder	19.35 m NR	Benthe König	17.28 m	Alida van Daalen	15.72 m
