= Zoë Sedney =

Dutch hurdler and sprinter

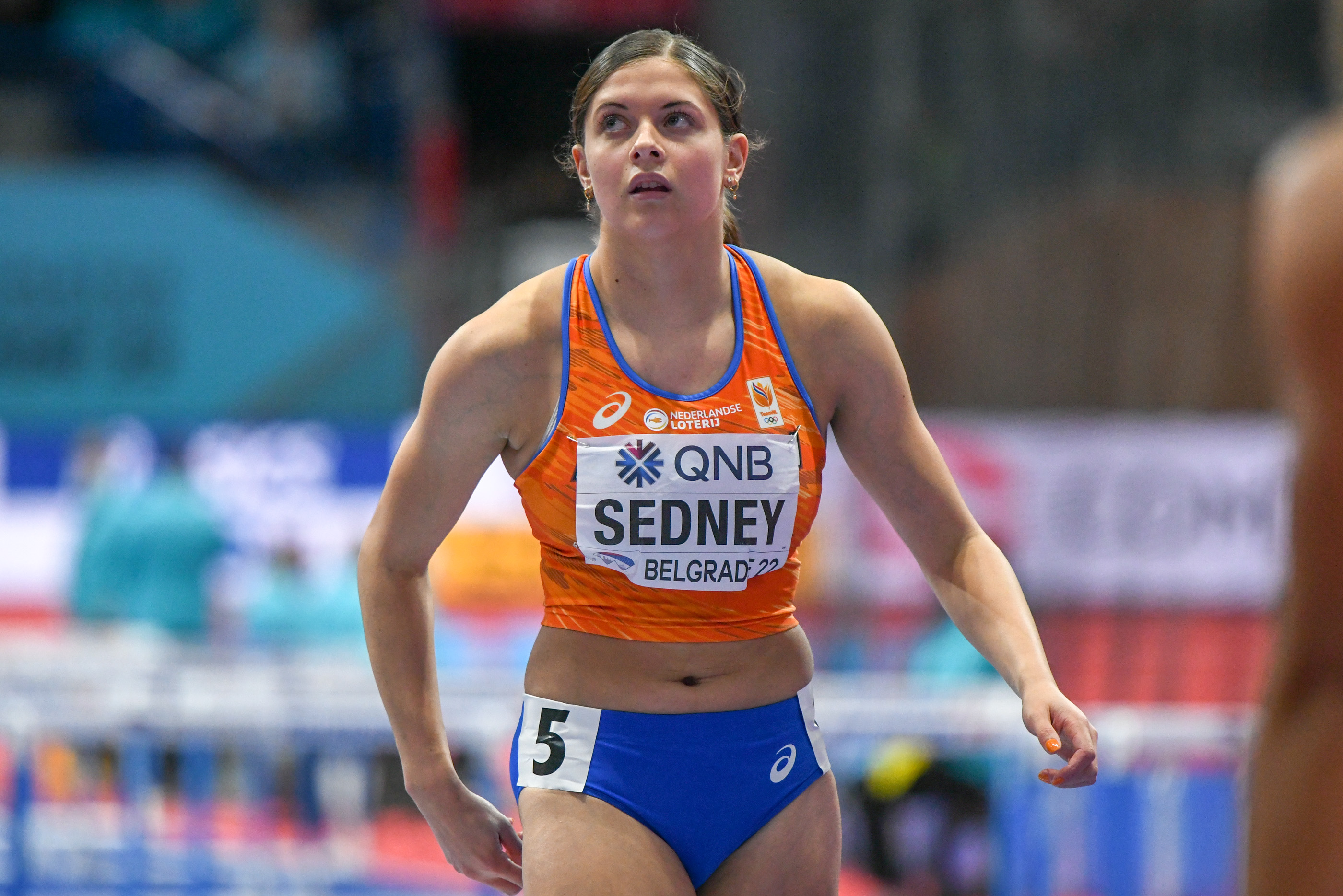
- Sedney at the 2022 World Indoor Championships in Belgrade

Personal information
- Full name: Zoë Frederique Sedney
- Born: 15 December 2001 (age 24) Zoetermeer, Netherlands
- Height: 1.74 m (5 ft 9 in)

Sport
- Sport: Athletics
- Event(s): 60 m, 100 m, 200 m, 400 m, 60 m hurdles, 100 m hurdles, 4 × 100 m relay
- Club: Rotterdam Atletiek
- Coached by: Bart Bennema (2021–2022); Brendan Troost (until 2021; since 2022); Laurent Meuwly (since 2022)

Achievements and titles
- Highest world ranking: No. 19 (100 m hurdles, 2022); No. 133 (200 m, 2020); No. 154 (400 m, 2023); No. 156 (100 m, 2023); No. 270 (overall, 2022)
Medal record
Women's athletics
Representing Netherlands
European U20 Championships
Silver medal – second place	2019 Borås	4 × 100 m relay
European U18 Championships
Silver medal – second place	2018 Gyor	100 m hurdles
European Youth Olympic Festival
Gold medal – first place	2017 Győr	100 m hurdles
Gold medal – first place	2017 Győr	200 m
Silver medal – second place	2017 Győr	4 × 100 m relay

Zoë Frederique Sedney (pronounced [ˈzoːeː freːdəˈrik ˈsɛtni]; born 15 December 2001) is a Dutch athlete who competes in the hurdles, 100 metres, 200 metres, 400 metres and 4 × 100 metres relay. Sedney won two gold medals at the 2017 European Youth Summer Olympic Festival. As a senior in 2021, she competed in both the European Indoor Championships and the Summer Olympics. In 2022, she became part of the 4 × 100 metres Dutch relay team, competing together with her older sister Naomi Sedney.

== Early life ==
Zoë Frederique Sedney was born on 15 December 2001 in Zoetermeer, Netherlands. She has two older sisters, of whom Naomi also became a sprinter, and a younger sister.

At the age of five, Sedney joined track and field club ARV Ilion in Zoetermeer. Until the age of 14, she combined athletics with playing field hockey at hockey club MHCZ in Zoetermeer.

== Youth and junior career ==
At the age of 15, Sedney decided to solely focus on athletics, a decision which paid off with qualifications on four individual disciplines (100 metres, 200 metres, 400 metres, and 100 metres hurdles) at the European Youth Olympic Festival in Győr, Hungary. Sedney ended up competing in the 200 metres and 100 metres hurdles, winning gold in both disciplines. At the same competition, she also competed with the Dutch relay team (Sedney, Minke Bisschops, Suzanne Libbers, and Anna Roelofs), winning silver in the 4 × 100 metres relay.

In 2018, Sedney went back to Győr, this time to compete in European U18 Championships. Sedney competed in the 100 metres hurdles, winning silver in 13.34 s.

In 2019, Sedney dealt with a hamstring injury, complicating her preparations for the European U20 Championships in Borås, Sweden. Sedney competed in the 200 metres where she reached 10th place and in the 4 × 100 metres relay where she won silver with the Dutch relay team (Bisschops, Sedney, Demi van den Wildenberg, and N'ketia Seedo).

2020 was the last year Sedney competed as a junior, she ended her junior career with 3 junior national titles in the 100 metres hurdles, 100 metres and 200 metres. She was called "the uncrowned queen of the national junior championships", becoming Junior National Champion 20 times and winning silver three times and bronze twice during her time as a junior.

== Senior career ==
In 2021, Sedney competed in her first international senior competition at the European Indoor Championships in Toruń, Poland. There she made it to the finals of the 60 metres hurdles and finished in 7th place in 8.00 s. In the summer of 2021, Sedney competed in the 100 metres hurdles in both the European U23 Championships in Tallinn, Estonia and her first Olympic Games in Tokyo, Japan. In the European U23 Championships Sedney finished 4th in 13.14 s. In her first Olympic Games, Sedney finished 7th in her heat in 13.03 s. This was not enough for a place in the semi-finals as Sedney needed a time of 13.00 s to go through to the next round. Sedney had the 24th time overall in the heats.

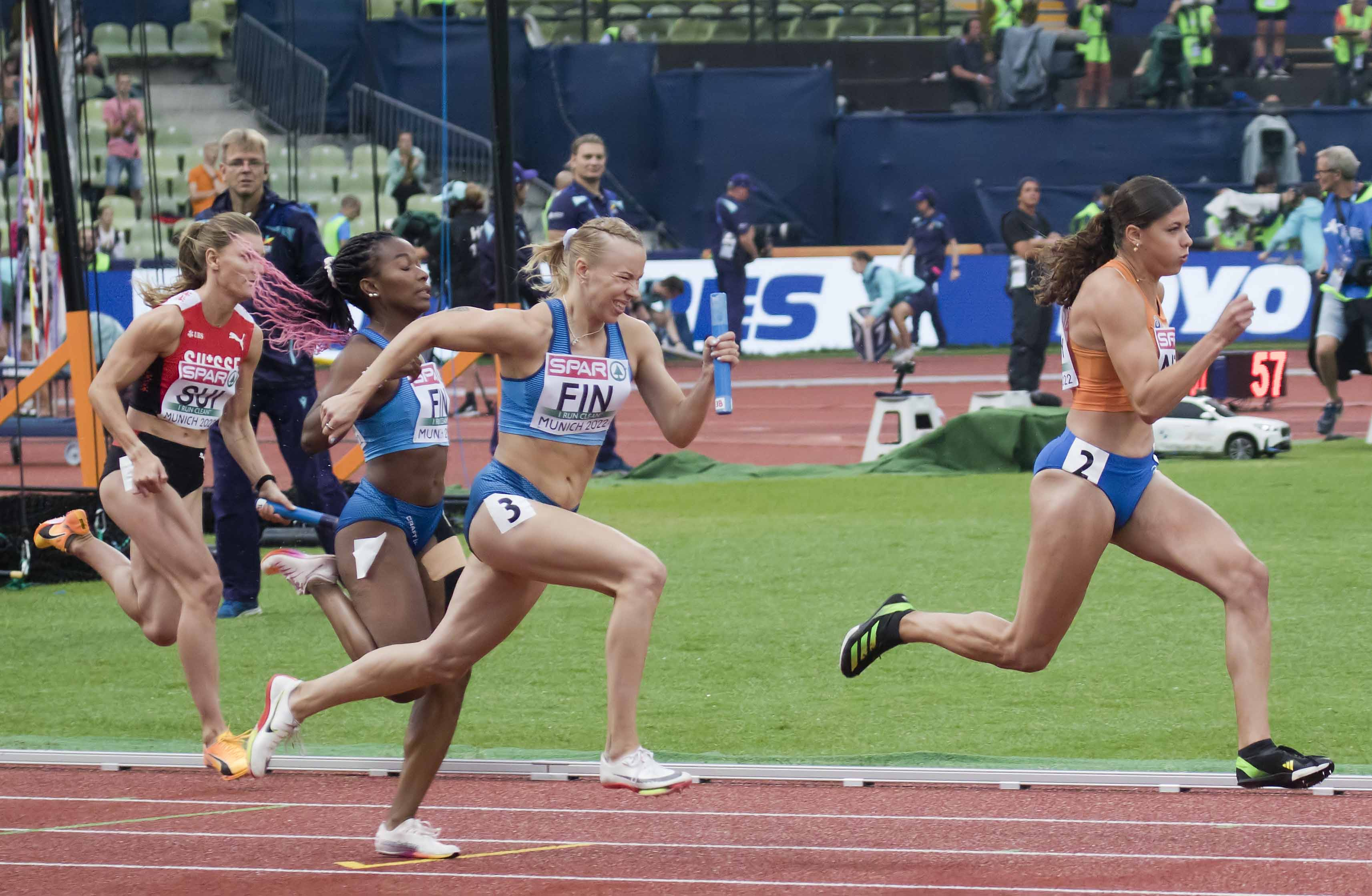
Sedney (right) during the 4 × 100 metres at the 2022 European Athletics Championships in Munich

Sedney started 2022 winning races at the World Athletics Indoor Tour in Birmingham and Madrid, and becoming national indoor champion on the 60 m hurdles. In March, Sedney represented the Netherlands in the World Indoor Championships in Belgrade, Serbia. She placed for the finals after winning her semi-final in 7.95 s. In the finals, Sedney finished 6th in 8.07 s. In the outdoor season, Sedney competed in both the World Championships in Eugene and the European Championships in Munich. In Eugene, Sedney finished 6th in her heat of the 60 metres hurdles in 13.38 s. This was not enough to progress to the semi finals. In the 4 × 100 metres relay, the Dutch team (Andrea Bouma, Zoë Sedney, Bisschops, and Naomi Sedney) stranded in the heats as well, finishing 6th in their heat. In Munich, Sedney competed in de hurdles and relay as well. In the hurdles, Sedney finished 7th in her semi-final after a fall during her practise starts. In the relay the 4 × 100 metres, Dutch team (Seedo, Zoë Sedney, Jamile Samuel, and Naomi Sedney) finished 5th overall.

In 2023, Sedney went to her second European Indoor Championships, this time in Istanbul. Sedney stranded in the semi-finals of the 60 metres hurdles, finishing 10th overall in 8.06 s. After the indoor season, Sedney changed her focus from the short hurdles to the 400 metres. Sedney stated she had less joy in hurdles and decided with her coaches (Laurent Meuwly and Brendan Troost) to make the switch. Sedney debuted on the 400 metres at the preprogramme of the Fanny Blankers-Koen Games, setting a personal best of 52.85 s. Throughout the season, Sedney went on to improve her personal best numerous times. At the 2023 European Athletics U23 Championships in Espoo, she improved her personal best to 52.02 s finishing 4th. Sedney went with the 4 × 400 metres relay team to the 2023 World Athletics Championships in Budapest, but did not run. She was in the stands cheering on the Dutch team (Eveline Saalberg, Lieke Klaver, Cathelijn Peeters, and Femke Bol) as they won the gold.

== Personal bests ==
Information from her World Athletics profile unless otherwise noted.

Outdoor

- 100 metres hurdles – 12.83 (+1.5 m/s, La Chaux-de-Fonds 2021)
- 100 metres – 11.30 (+0.8 m/s, Apeldoorn 2022)
- 200 metres – 23.27 (+0.2 m/s, Lede 2023)
- 400 metres - 52.02 (Espoo 2023)

Indoor

- 60 metres hurdles – 7.95 (Madrid 2022)
- 60 metres – 7.34 (Apeldoorn 2023)
- 200 metres short track – 23.71 (Apeldoorn 2019)

== Competition results ==
Information from her World Athletics profile unless otherwise noted.

=== World Athletics Rankings ===
Highest overall and event World Athletics Rankings per year.

Highest WA rankings per year
Year	100 m	200 m	400 m	100 m hurdles	Overall
2019	1117		–		
2020	368	**133**	–	168	1821
2021		135	–		
2022		–	–	**19**	**270**
2023	**156**	–	**154**	30	359

Lifetime best (in bold)

=== International competitions ===
Representing the Netherlands
Year	Competition	Venue	Position	Event	Time
2017	European Youth Olympic Festival	Győr, Hungary	1st	100 m hurdles (76.2 cm)	13.37
2017	European Youth Olympic Festival	Győr, Hungary	1st	200 m	23.74
2017	European Youth Olympic Festival	Győr, Hungary	2nd	4 × 100 m relay	46.05
2018	European U18 Championships	Győr, Hungary	2nd	100 m hurdles (76.2 cm)	13.34
2019	European U20 Championships	Borås, Sweden	10th (sf)	200 m	23.93
2019	European U20 Championships	Borås, Sweden	2nd	4 × 100 m relay	44.21
2021	European Indoor Championships	Toruń, Poland	7th	60 m hurdles	8.00 i
2021	European U23 Championships	Tallinn, Estonia	4th	100 m hurdles	13.14
2021	Olympic Games	Tokyo, Japan	24th (h)	100 m hurdles	13.03
2022	World Indoor Championships	Belgrade, Serbia	6th	60 m hurdles	8.07 i
2022	World Championships	Eugene, Oregon, USA	13th (h)	4 × 100 m relay	43.46
2022	World Championships	Eugene, Oregon, USA	33rd (h)	100 m hurdles	13.38
2022	European Championships	Munich, Germany	21st (sf)	100 m hurdles	13.42
2022	European Championships	Munich, Germany	5th	4 × 100 m relay	43.03
2023	European Indoor Championships	Istanbul, Turkey	10th (sf)	60 m hurdles	8.06 i
2023	European U23 Championships	Espoo, Finland	4th	400 m	52.02

=== Circuit wins ===
- World Athletics Indoor Tour
  60 m hurdles indoor wins, times (in seconds) specified in parentheses:
  - 2022 (3): Meeting Metz Moselle Athlélor (8.00 i), Birmingham Indoor Grand Prix (8.02 i), World Indoor Tour Madrid (8.08 i)

=== National championships ===
Year	Competition	Venue	Position	Event	Result
2016	Dutch U18 Indoor Combined Events Championships	Apeldoorn	8th	Pentathlon	3394 pts i
2016	Dutch U18 Indoor Championships	Apeldoorn	3rd	60 m	7.86 i
2016	Dutch U18 Championships	Breda	2nd	100 m	12.13
2016	Dutch U18 Championships	Breda	2nd	100 m hurdles (76.2 cm)	14.09
2016	Dutch U18 Championships	Breda	1st	400 m hurdles	1:02.36
2017	Dutch U18 Indoor Combined Events Championships	Apeldoorn	1st	Pentathlon	3601 pts i
2017	Dutch U20/U18 Indoor Championships, U18 Events	Apeldoorn	4th	60 m	7.72 i
2017	Dutch U20/U18 Indoor Championships, U18 Events	Apeldoorn	1st	60 m hurdles (76.2 cm)	8.62 i
2017	Dutch U18 Combined Events Championships	Emmeloord	1st	Heptathlon	5103 pts
2017	Dutch U20/U18 Championships, U18 Events	Vught	4th	100 m	12.06
2017	Dutch U20/U18 Championships, U18 Events	Vught	1st	200 m	23.92
2017	Dutch U20/U18 Championships, U18 Events	Vught	1st	100 m hurdles (76.2 cm)	14.22
2018	Dutch U18 Indoor Combined Events Championships	Apeldoorn	1st	Pentathlon	3832 pts i
2018	Dutch U18 Indoor Championships	Apeldoorn	1st	200 m	23.95 i
2018	Dutch U18 Indoor Championships	Apeldoorn	1st	60 m hurdles (76.2 cm)	8.46 i
2018	Dutch Indoor Championships	Apeldoorn	1st	200 m	24.19 i
2018	Dutch U18 Combined Events Championships	The Hague	2nd	Heptathlon	5259 pts
2018	Dutch U18 Championships	Emmeloord	1st	200 m	24.02
2018	Dutch U18 Championships	Emmeloord	1st	100 m hurdles (76.2 cm)	13.32
2019	Dutch U20 Indoor Combined Events Championships	Apeldoorn	1st	Pentathlon	3887 pts i
2019	Dutch U20 Indoor Championship	Apeldoorn	1st	200 m	23.71 i
2019	Dutch U20 Championships	Alphen aan den Rijn	1st	100 m hurdles	13.83
2019	Dutch U20 Championships	Alphen aan den Rijn	1st	200 m	23.63
2019	Dutch Championships	The Hague	5th in semifinal	100 m	12.05
2020	Dutch U20 Indoor Championships	Apeldoorn	1st	60 m	7.55 i
2020	Dutch U20 Indoor Championships	Apeldoorn	1st	200 m	23.80 i
2020	Dutch Indoor Championships	Apeldoorn	2nd	60 m hurdles	8.18 i
2020	Dutch Championships	Utrecht	3rd	100 m hurdles	13.30
2020	Dutch U20 Championships	Amersfoort	1st	100 m	11.62
2020	Dutch U20 Championships	Amersfoort	1st	200 m	23.83
2020	Dutch U20 Championships	Amersfoort	1st	100 m hurdles	13.34
2021	Dutch Indoor Championships	Apeldoorn	2nd	60 m hurdles	7.98 i
2021	Dutch Championships	Breda	2nd	100 m hurdles	13.13
2022	Dutch Indoor Championships	Apeldoorn	1st	60 m hurdles	7.98 i
2022	Dutch Championships	Apeldoorn	2nd	100 m	11.32
2022	Dutch Championships	Apeldoorn	2nd	100 m hurdles	13.09
2023	Dutch Indoor Championships	Apeldoorn	5th	60 m	7.34 i
2023	Dutch Championships	Breda	5th	400 m	53.71
