= 2018 Dutch Athletics Championships =

- Dates: 21–24 June 2018
- Host city: Utrecht, Netherlands
- Venue: Sportpark Maarschalkerweerd

The 2018 Dutch Athletics Championships was the national championship in outdoor track and field for the Netherlands. It was held on 21 to 24 June at the Sportpark Maarschalkerweerd in Utrecht. It served as the selection meeting for the Netherlands at the 2018 European Athletics Championships.

The pole vault was held at Vredenburg in the city centre on June 21, while the 10,000 metres championship was contested separately at the Leiden Golden Spike meeting on 9 June.

== Results ==
=== Men ===
Event	Gold		Silver		Bronze	
100 metres Wind: -2.6 m/s	Churandy Martina	10.43	Chris Garia	10.53	Joris van Gool	10.61
200 metres Wind: -3.2 m/s	Churandy Martina	20.83	Liemarvin Bonevacia	20.88	Solomon Bockarie	21.01
400 metres	Tony van Diepen	46.91	Jochem Dobber	47.23	Mathijs Dirks	47.81
800 metres	Jurgen Wielart	1:51.26	Maarten Plaum	1:51.80	Kevin Viezee	1:51.92
1500 metres	Richard Douma	3:58.34	Mike Foppen	3:58.60	Bram Anderiessen	3:59.63
5000 metres	Benjamin de Haan	14:18.34	Frank Futselaar	14:18.75	Roy Hoornweg	14:18.77
10,000 metres	Benjamin de Haan	28:44.84	Bart van Nunen	28:49.35	Frank Futselaar	29:15.78
110 m hurdles Wind: -1.6 m/s	Koen Smet	13.91	Liam van der Schaaf	14.16	Job Beintema	14.18
400 m hurdles	Nick Smidt	51.10	Jesper Arts	51.57	Martijn Meijer	52.91
3000 m s'chase	Noah Schutte	9:09.93	Barron de Groot Maizland	9:16.53	Tim van den Broeke	9:22.97
Long jump	Ignisious Gaisah	7.64 m (+1.6 m/s)	Dudley Boeldak	7.60 m (+1.8 m/s)	Pim Jehee	7.47 m (+2.0 m/s)
Triple jump	Fabian Florant	15.24 m (+1.5 m/s)	Joshua Record	15.10 m (+3.0 m/s)	Tarik Tahiri	14.52 m (+2.0 m/s)
High jump	Douwe Amels	2.20 m	Sven van Merode	2.11 m	Marius Wouters	2.08 m
Pole vault	Rutger Koppelaar	5.40 m	Sam Kranse	4.90 m	Timo de Water	4.80 m
Shot put	Patrick Cronie	19.01 m	Erik Cadée	18.32 m	Remco Goetheer	18.18 m
Discus throw	Erik Cadée	59.38 m	Caspar Hattink	58.45 m	Stephan Dekker	56.81 m
Javelin throw	Lars Timmerman	76.89 m	Daan Meyer	75.41 m	Jurriaan Wouters	70.22 m
Hammer throw	Dennis Hemelaar	60.05 m	Etiènne Orbons	59.32 m	Sander Stok	58.05 m
Decathlon	Rik Taam	7628 pts	Nout Wardenburg	7130 pts	Paul Groen	7070 pts

=== Women ===
Event	Gold		Silver		Bronze	
100 metres Wind: -0.3 m/s	Jamile Samuel	11.49	Naomi Sedney	11.57	Marije van Hunenstijn	11.63
200 metres Wind: -2.0 m/s	Jamile Samuel	23.04	Tasa Jiya	23.43	Tessa van Schagen	23.48
400 metres	Madiea Ghafoor	51.84	Lisanne de Witte	52.22	Laura de Witte	52.90
800 metres	Britt Ummels	2:10.75	Suzanne Voorrips	2:11.00	Marissa Damink	2:11.24
1500 metres	Sanne Wolters-Verstegen	4:24.24	Britt Ummels	4:25.48	Lotte Krause	4:25.84
5000 metres	Jip Vastenburg	15:51.55	Julia van Velthoven	16:06.00	Jill Holterman	16:16.27
10,000 metres	Jip Vastenburg	33:03.42	Jill Holterman	33:43.38	Ruth van der Meijden	34:25.94
100 m hurdles Wind: -1.5 m/s	Eefje Boons	13.27	Anouk Vetter	13.80	Chanté Samuel	14.01
400 m hurdles	Anna Sjoukje Runia	58.35	Nora Ritzen	58.94	Maruska Eduarda	60.66
3000 m s'chase	Irene van der Reijken	10:11.84	Veerle Bakker	10:24.94	Jasmijn Bakker	10:26.25
Long jump	Carlijn ter Laak	6.36 m (+1.8 m/s)	Tara Yoro	6.18 m (+2.4 m/s)	Kika van Bergen en Henegouwen	6.11 m (+2.1 m/s)
Triple jump	Patricia Krolis	12.37 m (+1.8 m/s)	Louise Taatgen	12.29 m (+1.7 m/s)	Maureen Herremans	12.19 m (+2.8 m/s)
High jump	Manon Schoop	1.76 m	Nele van den Broek	1.73 m	Chanté Samuel	1.73 m
Pole vault	Kiliana Heymans	4.10 m	Marijke Wijnmaalen	4.00 m	Robin Wingbermühle	3.90 m
Shot put	Melissa Boekelman	18.36 m	Jessica Schilder	15.70 m	Jorinde van Klinken	15.66 m
Discus throw	Corinne Nugter	59.10 m	Jorinde van Klinken	57.10 m	Enid Duut	51.15 m
Javelin throw	Nadine Broersen	54.34 m	Danien ten Berge	53.21 m	Lisanne Schol	52.94 m
Hammer throw	Sina Mai Holthuijsen	62.14 m	Wendy Koolhaas	58.83 m	Jorinde van Klinken	56.98 m
Heptathlon	Myke van de Wiel	5475 pts	Anne van de Wiel	5237 pts	Melissa de Haan	5203 pts
