= 2019 Dutch Athletics Championships =

- Dates: 25–28 July 2019
- Host city: The Hague, Netherlands
- Venue: Sportpark Laan van Poot

The 2019 Dutch Athletics Championships was the national championship in outdoor track and field for the Netherlands. It was held on 25 to 28 July at the Sportpark Laan van Poot in The Hague. It served as the selection meeting for the Netherlands at the 2019 World Championships in Athletics. It was organised by local club Haag Atletiek and Atletiekunie. The long jump competitions were held within the Hague city centre in 25 July while the 10,000 metres took place earlier at the annual Golden Spike Leiden meeting on 8 June.

== Results ==
=== Men ===
Event	Gold		Silver		Bronze	
100 metres Wind: -1.2 m/s	Hensley Paulina	10.35	Chris Garia	10.41	Churandy Martina	10.42
200 metres Wind: -0.5 m/s	Churandy Martina	21.00	Chris Garia	21.05	Taymir Burnet	21.08
400 metres	Terrence Agard	46.15	Tony van Diepen	46.44	Liemarvin Bonevacia	46.86
800 metres	Maarten Plaum	1:54.48	Jurgen Wielart	1:54.99	Jaap Gerben Vellinga	1:55.16
1500 metres	Richard Douma	3:51.99	Valentijn Weinans	3:52.44	Mahadi Abdi-Ali	3:52.71
5000 metres	Mike Foppen	13:59.09	Stan NIesten	14:12.26	Niek Blikslager	14:12.90
10,000 metres	Bart van Nunen	29:12.34	Frank Futselaar	29:25.06	Edwin de Vries	29:35.31
110 m hurdles Wind: -0.5 m/s	Job Beintema	14.27	Jules de Bont	14.50	Dave Wesselink	14.79
400 m hurdles	Nick Smidt	50.77	Pieter Braun	53.22	Martijn Meijer	53.24
3000 m s'chase	Noah Schutte	9:13.85	Lars Cazander	9:16.02	Cas Lutz	9:17.03
Long jump	Fabian Florant	7.36 m (+0.3 m/s)	Rik Taam	7.27 m (+0.3 m/s)	Antonny Ediagbonya	7.24 m (+0.8 m/s)
Triple jump	Fabian Florant	15.41 m (+0.8 m/s)	Tarik Tahiri	15.17 m (+1.0 m/s)	Joshua Record	14.75 m (+2.3 m/s)
High jump	Douwe Amels	2.23 m	Sven van Merode	2.14 m	Marius Wouters	2.11 m
Pole vault	Rutger Koppelaar	5.65 m	Menno Vloon	5.50 m	Timo de Water	5.10 m
Shot put	Denzel Comenentia	20.25 m	Patrick Cronie	19.58 m	Remco Goetheer	18.05 m
Discus throw	Caspar Hattink	58.11 m	Stephan Dekker	55.85 m	Shaquille Emanuelson	55.23 m
Javelin throw	Mart ten Berge	74.89 m	Lars Timmerman	74.84 m	Tom Egbers	70.50 m
Hammer throw	Etiènne Orbons	63.27 m	Luuk Vos	62.48 m	Dennis Hemelaar	62.18 m
Decathlon	Eelco Sintnicolaas	7679 pts	Martijn Hoogewerf	7248 pts	Steven Eleonora	7010 pts

=== Women ===
Event	Gold		Silver		Bronze	
100 metres Wind: -0.9 m/s	Dafne Schippers	11.33	Jamile Samuel	11.52	N’ketia Seedo	11.61
200 metres Wind: -1.1 m/s	Tessa van Schagen	23.67	Nargélis Statia	23.74	Leonie van Vliet	23.91
400 metres	Lisanne de Witte	52.29	Maureen Ellsworth	52.92	Lieke Klaver	53.18
800 metres	Britt Ummels	2:06.54	Marissa Damink	2:07.59	Bregje Sloot	2:10.28
1500 metres	Britt Ummels	4:11.47	Maureen Koster	4:13.94	Jip Vastenburg	4:17.13
5000 metres	Irene van der Reijken	16:32.04	Bo Ummels	16:36.47	Tirza van der Wolf	16:38.52
10,000 metres	Jasmijn Lau	33:30.97	Bo Ummels	33:42.60	Diane van Es	34:29.91
100 m hurdles Wind: -0.9 m/s	Eefje Boons	13.38	Marijke Esselink	13.72	Chanté Samuel	13.91
400 m hurdles	Eveline Saalberg	58.86	Nora Ritzen	59.51	Cathelijn Peeters	59.80
3000 m s'chase	Irene van der Reijken	10:00.06	Jasmijn Bakker	10:10.38	Veerle Bakker	10:16.84
Long jump	Anouk Vetter	6.31 m (-0.3 m/s)	Tara Yoro	6.26 m (+1.8 m/s)	Eva Bastmeijer	6.22 m (+0.1 m/s)
Triple jump	Nora RItzen	13.02 m (+0.9 m/s)	Maureen Herremans	12.64 m (+0.1 m/s)	Meruska Eduarda	12.54 m (+0.7 m/s)
High jump	Lisanne Hagens	1.82 m	Glenka Antonia	1.82 m	Marlies van Haaren	1.79 m
Pole vault	Killiana Heymans	4.30 m	Marijke Wijnmaalen	4.00 m	Karlijn Schouten	3.90 m
Shot put	Melissa Boekelman	17.70 m	Jorinde van Klinken	16.79 m	Jessica Schilder	16.14 m
Discus throw	Corinne Nugter	58.02 m	Jorinde van Klinken	55.34 m	Alida van Daalen	55.19 m
Javelin throw	Anouk Vetter	55.20 m	Emma Oosterwegel	52.46 m	Dewi Lafontaine	50.34 m
Hammer throw	Wendy Koolhaas	64.26 m	Sina Mai Holthuijsen	61.96 m	Marije Efdee	57.05 m
Heptathlon	Anne van de Wiel	5712 pts	Michelle Oud	5644 pts	Myke van de Wiel	5598 pts
