= Dutch Indoor Athletics Championships =

Dutch Indoor Athletics Championships Nederlandse kampioenschappen indooratletiek
- Status: Active
- Genre: National championships; Indoor track and field
- Frequency: Annually
- Country: Netherlands
- Years active: 57
- Inaugurated: 1–2 March 1969
- Most recent: 22–23 February 2025
- Organiser: Royal Dutch Athletics Federation

The Dutch Indoor Athletics Championships (Dutch: Nederlandse kampioenschappen indooratletiek) is an annual indoor track and field competition organised by the Royal Dutch Athletics Federation, which serves as the national championship for the sport in the Netherlands. Typically held over two to three days in February during the Dutch winter, it was first added to the national calendar in 1969, supplementing the main outdoor Dutch Athletics Championships held in the summer since 1910.

== Events ==
The following athletics events feature as standard on the Dutch Indoor Championships programme:

- Sprint: 60 m, 200 m, 400 m
- Distance track events: 800 m, 1500 m, 3000 m
- Hurdles: 60 m hurdles
- Jumps: long jump, triple jump, high jump, pole vault
- Throws: shot put
- Combined events: heptathlon (men), pentathlon (women)

The 200 m was introduced in 1982, and was briefly removed from the programme from 2006–10 before being reintroduced. Combined events was first held in 1976. Racewalking is longer contested but men previously competed in the 3000 metres race walk and 5000 metres race walk until it was dropped in 2007. The women's programme expanded in line with changes at international level. A women's 1500 metres was added in 1972, followed by a 3000 metres in 1979. The fields events were also increased to match the men's schedule, with triple jump being first held in 1991 and pole vault in 1996.

== Editions ==
| Year | Dates | City | Ref. |
|---|---|---|---|
| 1969 | 1–2 March | Amsterdam | |
| 1970 | 7–8 March | Groningen | |
| 1971 | 20–21 February | Rotterdam | |
| 1972 | 26–27 February | Leiden | |
| 1973 | 10–11 February | Leiden | |
| 1974 | 16–17 February | Arnhem | |
| 1975 | 22 February | Groningen | |
| 1976 | 31 January–1 February | Arnhem | |
| 1977 | 19–20 February | Zwolle | |
| 1978 | 4–5 February | Zwolle | |
| 1979 | 3–4 February | Zwolle | |
| 1980 | 2–3 February | Zwolle | |
| 1981 | 31 January–1 February | Zwolle | |
| 1982 | 20–21 February | Rotterdam | |
| 1983 | 19–20 February | Zuidlaren | |
| 1984 | 11–12 February | Zuidlaren | |
| 1985 | 2–3 February | Maastricht | |
| 1986 | 8–9 February | Zuidlaren | |
| 1987 | 6–8 February | The Hague | |
| 1988 | 20–21 February | The Hague | |
| 1989 | 3–5 February | The Hague | |
| 1990 | 17–18 February | The Hague | |
| 1991 | 16–17 February | The Hague | |
| 1992 | 15–16 February | The Hague | |
| 1993 | 27–28 February | The Hague | |
| 1994 | 19–20 February | The Hague | |
| 1995 | 18–19 February | The Hague | |
| 1996 | 24–25 February | The Hague | |
| 1997 | 22–23 February | The Hague | |
| 1998 | 14–15 February | The Hague | |
| 1999 | 20–21 February | The Hague | |
| 2000 | 12 February | Ghent | |
| 2001 | 17 February | Ghent | |
| 2002 | 16 February | Ghent | |
| 2003 | 15 February | Ghent | |
| 2004 | 21 February | Ghent | |
| 2005 | 19 February | Ghent | |
| 2006 | 18 February | Ghent | |
| 2007 | 17 February | Ghent | |
| 2008 | 16 February | Ghent | |
| 2009 | 14–15 February | Apeldoorn | |
| 2010 | 6–7 February | Apeldoorn | |
| 2011 | 12–13 February | Apeldoorn | |
| 2012 | 25–26 February | Apeldoorn | |
| 2013 | 16–17 February | Apeldoorn | |
| 2014 | 22–23 February | Apeldoorn | |
| 2015 | 21–22 February | Apeldoorn | |
| 2016 | 27–28 February | Apeldoorn | |
| 2017 | 11–12 February | Apeldoorn | |
| 2018 | 17–18 February | Apeldoorn | |
| 2019 | 16–17 February | Apeldoorn | |
| 2020 | 22–23 February | Apeldoorn | |
| 2021 | 20–21 February | Apeldoorn | |
| 2022 | 26–27 February | Apeldoorn | |
| 2023 | 18–19 February | Apeldoorn | |
| 2024 | 17–18 February | Apeldoorn | |
| 2025 | 22–23 February | Apeldoorn | |
| 2026 | 28 February–1 March | Apeldoorn | |

== Championships records ==
=== Men ===
| Event | Record | Athlete/Team | Date | Championships | Place | Ref. |
|---|---|---|---|---|---|---|
| 60 m | 6.58 | Taymir Burnet | 28 February 2026 | 2026 Championships | Apeldoorn | |
| 200 m | 20.90 | Onyema Adigida | 23 February 2020 | 2020 Championships | Apeldoorn | |
| 400 m | 45.48 NR | Liemarvin Bonevacia | 27 February 2022 | 2022 Championships | Apeldoorn | |
| 800 m | 1:46.21 | Thijmen Kupers | 28 February 2016 | 2016 Championships | Apeldoorn | |
| 1500 m | 3:37.08 | Stefan Nillessen | 23 February 2025 | 2025 Championships | Apeldoorn | |
| 3000 m | 7:49.26 | Tim Verbaandert | 22 February 2025 | 2025 Championships | Apeldoorn | |
| 60 m hurdles | 7.57 | Job Geerds | 18 February 2024 | 2024 Championships | Apeldoorn | |
| High jump | 2.25 m | Wilbert Pennings | 12 February 2000 | 2000 Championships | Ghent | |
| Pole vault | 5.91 m | Menno Vloon | 27 February 2022 | 2022 Championships | Apeldoorn | |
| Long jump | 8.23 m | Emiel Mellaard | 5 February 1989 | 1989 Championships | The Hague | |
| Triple jump | 16.45 m | Fabian Florant | 16 February 2013 | 2013 Championships | Apeldoorn | |
| Shot put | 20.89 m | Rutger Smith | 16 February 2008 | 2008 Championships | Ghent | |

=== Women ===
| Event | Record | Athlete/Team | Date | Championships | Place | Ref. |
|---|---|---|---|---|---|---|
| 60 m | 7.03 | Dafne Schippers | 27 February 2016 | 2016 Championships | Apeldoorn | |
| 200 m | 23.10 | Marije van Hunenstijn | 18 February 2024 | 2024 Championships | Apeldoorn | |
| 400 m | 49.24 | Femke Bol | 18 February 2024 | 2024 Championships | Apeldoorn | |
| 800 m | 2:01.83 | Sanne Verstegen | 12 February 2017 | 2017 Championships | Apeldoorn | |
| 1500 m | 4:07.98 | Maureen Koster | 18 February 2023 | 2023 Championships | Apeldoorn | |
| 3000 m | 8:50.74 | Maureen Koster | 22 February 2025 | 2025 Championships | Apeldoorn | |
| 60 m hurdles | 7.84 | Nadine Visser | 23 February 2025 | 2025 Championships | Apeldoorn | |
| High jump | 1.90 m | Jeanelle Scheper | 23 February 2020 | 2020 Championships | Apeldoorn | |
| High jump | 1.90 m | Britt Weerman | 19 February 2023 | 2023 Championships | Apeldoorn | |
| Pole vault | 4.50 m | Femke Pluim | 28 February 2016 | 2016 Championships | Apeldoorn | |
| Long jump | 6.54 m | Tineke Hidding | 17 February 1990 | 1990 Championships | The Hague | |
| Long jump | 6.54 m | Pauline Hondema | 18 February 2024 | 2024 Championships | Apeldoorn | |
| Triple jump | 13.09 m | Maureen Herremans | 18 February 2023 | 2023 Championships | Apeldoorn | |
| Shot put | 20.31 m | Jessica Schilder | 17 February 2024 | 2024 Championships | Apeldoorn | |

=== Mixed ===
| Event | Record | Athlete/Team | Date | Championships | Place | Ref. |
|---|---|---|---|---|---|---|
| 4 × 400m relay | 3:38.80 | Altis; Rogier Groeneweg; Evita Smeeing; Lars van Vught; Jackie Vissers | 23 February 2025 | 2025 Championships | Apeldoorn | |
