= Pauline Hondema =

Dutch athlete (born 2000)

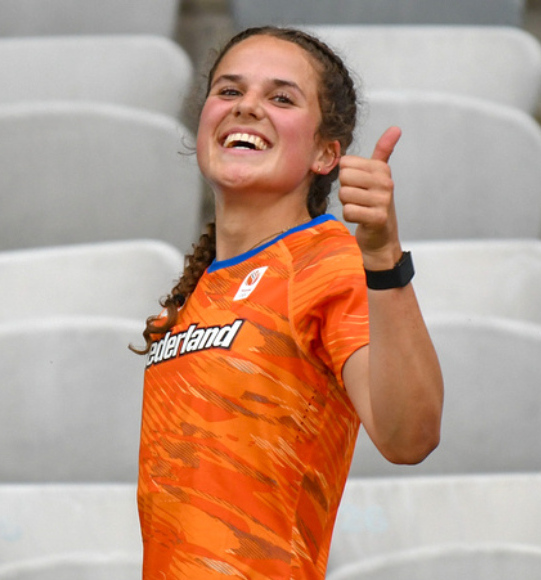
- Pauline Hondema in 2021

Personal information
- Nationality: Dutch
- Born: 28 March 2000 (age 26)
- Height: 1.71 m (5 ft 7 in)

Sport
- Sport: Athletics
- Event: Long jump

Achievements and titles
- Highest world ranking: No. 20 (long jump, 2025); No. 600 (overall, 2025)
- Personal bests: Long jump: 6.91 m NR (Kortrijk, 2025)

Pauline Hondema (pronounced [pʌuˈlinə ˈɦɔndəmaː]; born 28 March 2000) is a Dutch track and field athlete competing in the long jump. She holds the Dutch records outdoor of 6.91 m and indoor of 6.70 m both set in 2025. Hondema finished second in the First League of the 2021 European Athletics Team Championships. And she is a six-time national senior champion (three outdoor and three indoor titles).

== Biography ==
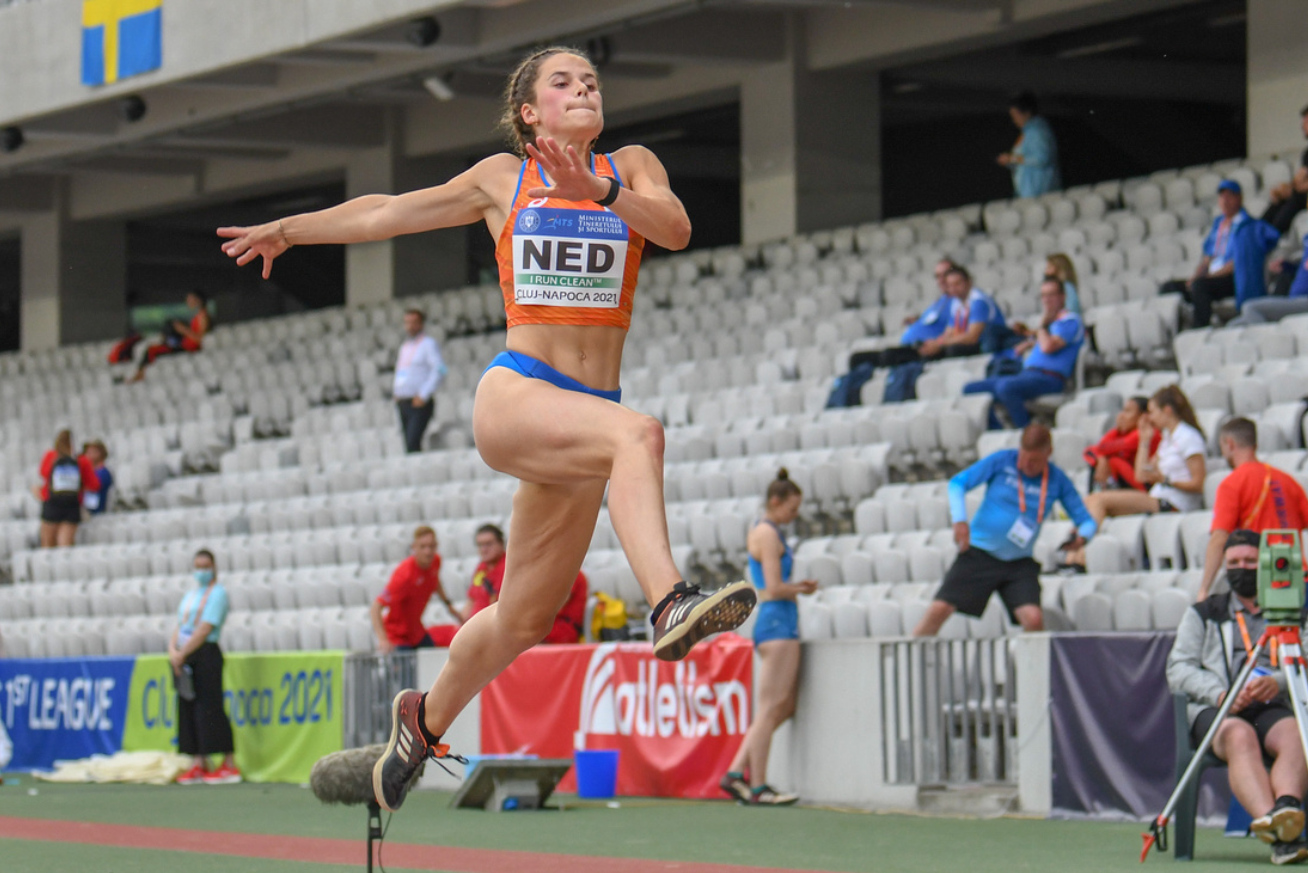
Hondema mid-air at the 2021 European Team Championships in Cluj-Napoca, Romania

She won the Dutch national title for the first time in Apeldoorn in June 2022.

=== 2023 ===
In February 2023, she won the Dutch national indoor title in Apeldoorn.

In June 2023, she represented the Netherlands sat the 2023 European Games in Silesia. In July 2023, she set a new personal best of 6.76 metres competing in Kortrijk, Belgium. That month, she retained her Dutch national title in Breda.

She competed at the 2023 World Athletics Championships in Budapest, missing the final by four centimetres.

=== 2024 ===
In February 2024, she won the Dutch indoor title.

In June 2024, she competed at the 2024 European Athletics Championships in Rome. That month, she won her third consecutive Dutch national title.

She competed in the long jump at the 2024 Paris Olympics.

=== 2025 ===
On 9 February 2025, she improved the 38-year-old Dutch indoor record with a jump of 6.65 m, further improved to 6.70 m less than a week later. Later that month she won the Dutch indoor national title. She was selected for the 2025 European Athletics Indoor Championships in Apeldoorn. In qualifying for the final she jumped a Dutch indoor record of 6.70 metres.

In September 2025, she competed at the 2025 World Championships in Tokyo, Japan, placing seventh overall.

=== 2026 ===
Hondema jumped 6.63 metres to win the long jump title at the 2026 Dutch Indoor Athletics Championships in Apeldoorn. In August 2026, she competed for the Netherlands at the 2026 European Athletics Championships in Birmingham, England, and placed 11th in the long jump final with a best of 6.47 meters.

== Personal bests ==
Information from Hondema's World Athletics profile.

Hondema's personal best results
Event		Result	Location	Date	Record	Notes
60 metres		8.08 s i	Apeldoorn, Netherlands	9 February 2019		
Long jump	outdoor	6.91 m	Kortrijk, Belgium	12 July 2025	NR	(Wind: +1.7 m/s)
Long jump	indoor	6.70 m i	Berlin, Germany	14 February 2025	NR	
Long jump	indoor	6.70 m i	Apeldoorn, Netherlands	7 March 2025	NR	

== Competition results ==
Information from Hondema's World Athletics profile.

=== International championships ===
Achievements at international championships representing the Netherlands
Year	Competition	Location	Position	Event	Result
2021	European Team Championships – First League	Cluj-Napoca, Romania	2nd	Long jump	6.40 m
2021	European U23 Championships	Tallinn, Finland	10th	Long jump	6.21 m
2023	European Games	Chorzów, Poland	5th	Long jump	6.49 m
2023	European Team Championships – First Division	Chorzów, Poland	5th	Long jump	6.49 m
2023	World Championships	Budapest, Hungary	15th (h)	Long jump	6.57 m
2024	European Championships	Rome, Italy	13th (h)	Long jump	6.63 m
2024	Olympic Games	Paris, France	14th (h)	Long jump	6.55 m
2025	European Indoor Championships	Apeldoorn, Netherlands	7th	Long jump	6.50 m
2025	World Championships	Tokyo, Japan	7th	Long jump	6.60 m
2026	European Championships	Birmingham, United Kingdom	11th	Long jump	6.47 m

=== Circuit wins ===
Hondema won the long jump at the following circuit meetings:

- World Athletics Continental Tour
  - 2023 (3): Oordegem IFAM (6.53 m), Kortrijk Guldensporenmeeting (6.76 m PB), Banská Bystrica P-T-S meeting (6.42 m)
  - 2024 (2): Kortrijk (6.69 m), Tampere Motonet GP (6.47 m)
  - 2025 (2): Geneva Atleticageneve (6.69 m), Kortrijk (6.91 m NR)
- World Athletics Indoor Tour
  - 2023 (1): Ghent IFAM Indoor (6.57 m i)
  - 2024 (1): Amiens Meeting 3 Sauts (6.41 m i)
  - 2025 (2): Amiens (6.58 m i), Düsseldorf ISTAF Indoor (6.65 m i NR)

=== National championships ===
Achievements at national championships
Year	Competition	Location	Position	Event	Result
2016	Dutch U18 Indoor Championships	Apeldoorn	– (h)	60 metres	8.34 s i
2016	Dutch U18 Indoor Championships	Apeldoorn	4th	Long jump	5.42 m i
2016	Dutch Championships	Amsterdam	4th	Long jump	5.80 m
2016	Dutch U18 Championships	Breda	2nd	Long jump	5.69 m
2017	Dutch U20/U18 Championships – U18 Events	Vught	1st	Long jump	5.78 m
2017	Dutch Championships	Utrecht	7th	Long jump	5.77 m
2018	Dutch U20 Indoor Championships	Apeldoorn	2nd	Long jump	5.79 m i
2018	Dutch Indoor Championships	Apeldoorn	7th	Long jump	5.63 m i
2018	Dutch U20 Championships	Emmeloord	1st	Long jump	5.98 m w
2018	Dutch Championships	Utrecht	10th	Long jump	5.65 m
2019	Dutch U20 Indoor Championships	Apeldoorn	1st	Long jump	5.94 m i
2019	Dutch U20 Indoor Championships	Apeldoorn	– (sf)	60 metres	8.16 s i
2019	Dutch Indoor Championships	Apeldoorn	3rd	Long jump	6.00 m i
2019	Dutch U20 Championships	Alphen aan den Rijn	1st	Long jump	6.12 m
2019	Dutch Championships	The Hague	7th	Long jump	6.04 m
2020	Dutch Indoor Championships	Apeldoorn	3rd	Long jump	6.03 m i
2020	Dutch Championships	Utrecht	2nd	Long jump	6.09 m
2021	Dutch Indoor Championships	Apeldoorn	2nd	Long jump	6.41 m i
2021	Dutch Championships	Breda	3rd	Long jump	6.14 m
2022	Dutch Indoor Championships	Apeldoorn	2nd	Long jump	6.27 m i
2022	Dutch Championships	Apeldoorn	1st	Long jump	6.16 m
2023	Dutch Indoor Championships	Apeldoorn	1st	Long jump	6.48 m i
2023	Dutch Championships	Breda	1st	Long jump	6.37 m
2024	Dutch Indoor Championships	Apeldoorn	1st	Long jump	6.54 m i
2024	Dutch Championships	Hengelo	1st	Long jump	6.68 m w
2025	Dutch Indoor Championships	Apeldoorn	1st	Long jump	6.53 m i
2025	Dutch Championships	Hengelo	1st	Long jump	6.76 m w
