= Demi van den Wildenberg =

Dutch sprinter

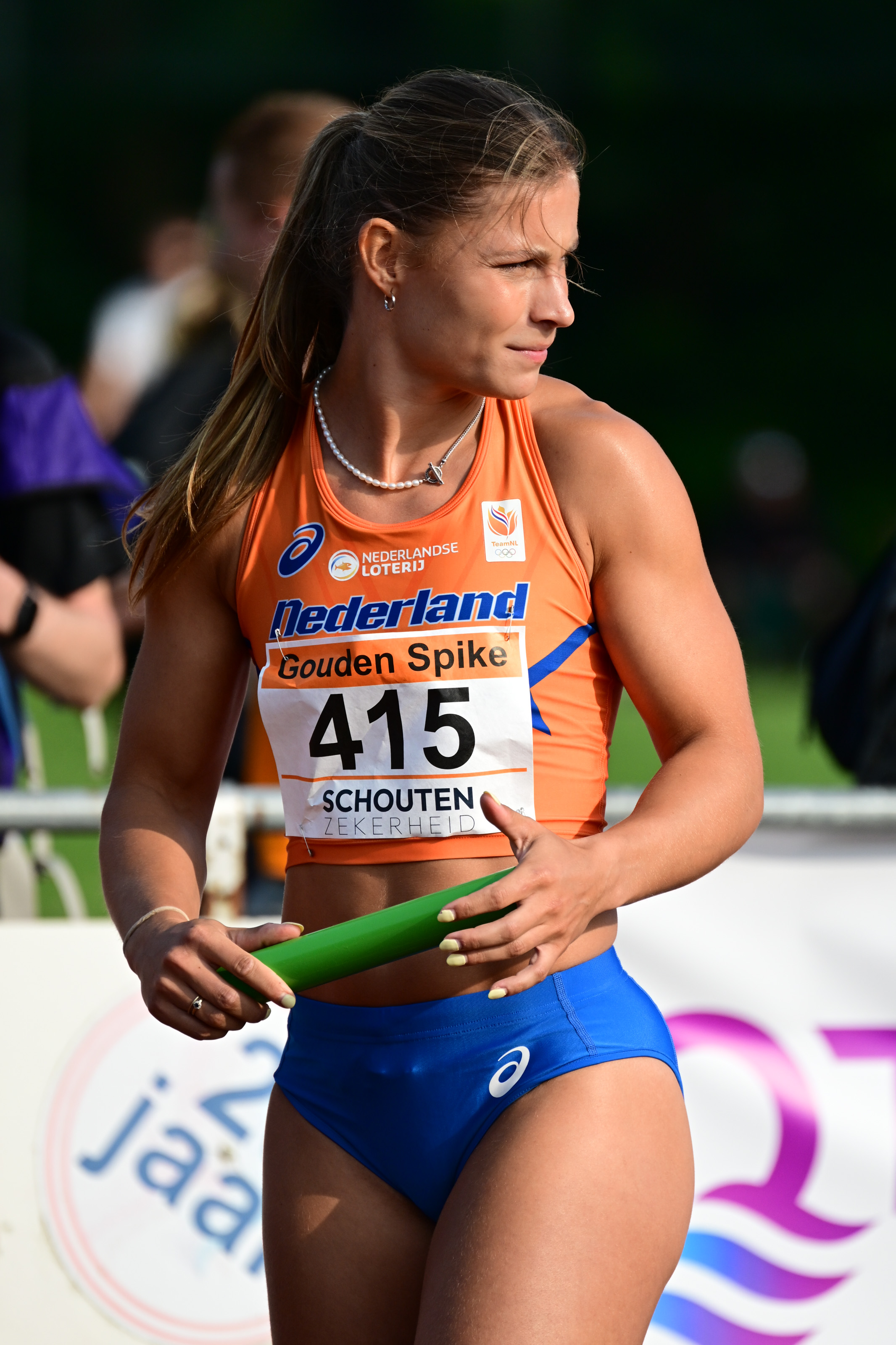
- Demi van den Wildenberg at the 2025 Gouden Spike Meeting in Leiden, Netherlands.

Personal information
- Born: 29 February 2000 (age 26)

Sport
- Country: Netherlands
- Sport: Athletics
Medal record
Women's athletics
Representing Netherlands
European U20 Championships
Silver medal – second place	2019 Borås	4×100 m relay

Demi van den Wildenberg (born 29 February 2000) is a Dutch sprinter. She competed for the Netherlands at the 2025 World Athletics Championships.

== Biography ==
She placed second over 60 meters At the Dutch Indoor Athletics Championships in February 2022, before placing third in the event the following year at the championships. In 2022, she was a silver medalist at the 2019 European Athletics U20 Championships in the 4 × 100 metres relay running alongside Minke Bisschops, Zoë Sedney and N'ketia Seedo in Boras, Sweden.

She made her senior international debut with the Dutch team at the 2025 World Athletics Relays as part of the mixed 4 × 100 m relay team in Guangzhou, China in May 2025.

She was selected for the Dutch team for the 2025 World Athletics Championships in Tokyo, Japan, running as part of the women's 4 x 100 metres relay team in September 2025, which did not qualify for the final.

In May 2026, she competed with the Dutch squad at the 2026 World Athletics Relays in Gaborone, Botswana.
