= Maureen Ellsworth =

Dutch sprinter

Personal information
- Nationality: Dutch
- Born: 12 October 1991 (age 34)

Sport
- Sport: Athletics
- Event: 400 metres
- Club: AV Lycurgus

Achievements and titles
- World finals: Doha 2019 - 4x400m

Maureen Ellsworth (born 12 October 1991) is a Dutch track and field athlete who specializes in the 400 metres. In July 2019 she set her current personal best of 52.90 seconds.

She was 400 m runner-up to Lisanne de Witte at the 2019 Dutch Athletics Championships, coming close to her personal best with 52.92 seconds. As a result, she was selected for the 2019 European Team Championships and anchored the Dutch women's 4 × 400 metres relay team to third place in the First League section. Ellsworth was chosen for the relay team at the 2019 World Athletics Championships but ultimately did not compete. Ellsworth ranked third nationally on time for that season, behind de Witte and Madiea Ghafoor.

== Personal bests ==
Outdoor

- 400 metres – 52.90 (Oordegem 2019)

Indoor

- 400 metres – 54.15 (Apeldoorn 2019)
