= Dutch Athletics Championships =

National athletics competition

Dutch Athletics Championships Nederlandse kampioenschappen atletiek
- Status: Active
- Genre: National championships; Track and field
- Frequency: Annually
- Country: Netherlands
- Most recent: 28–30 June 2024
- Organiser: Royal Dutch Athletics Federation

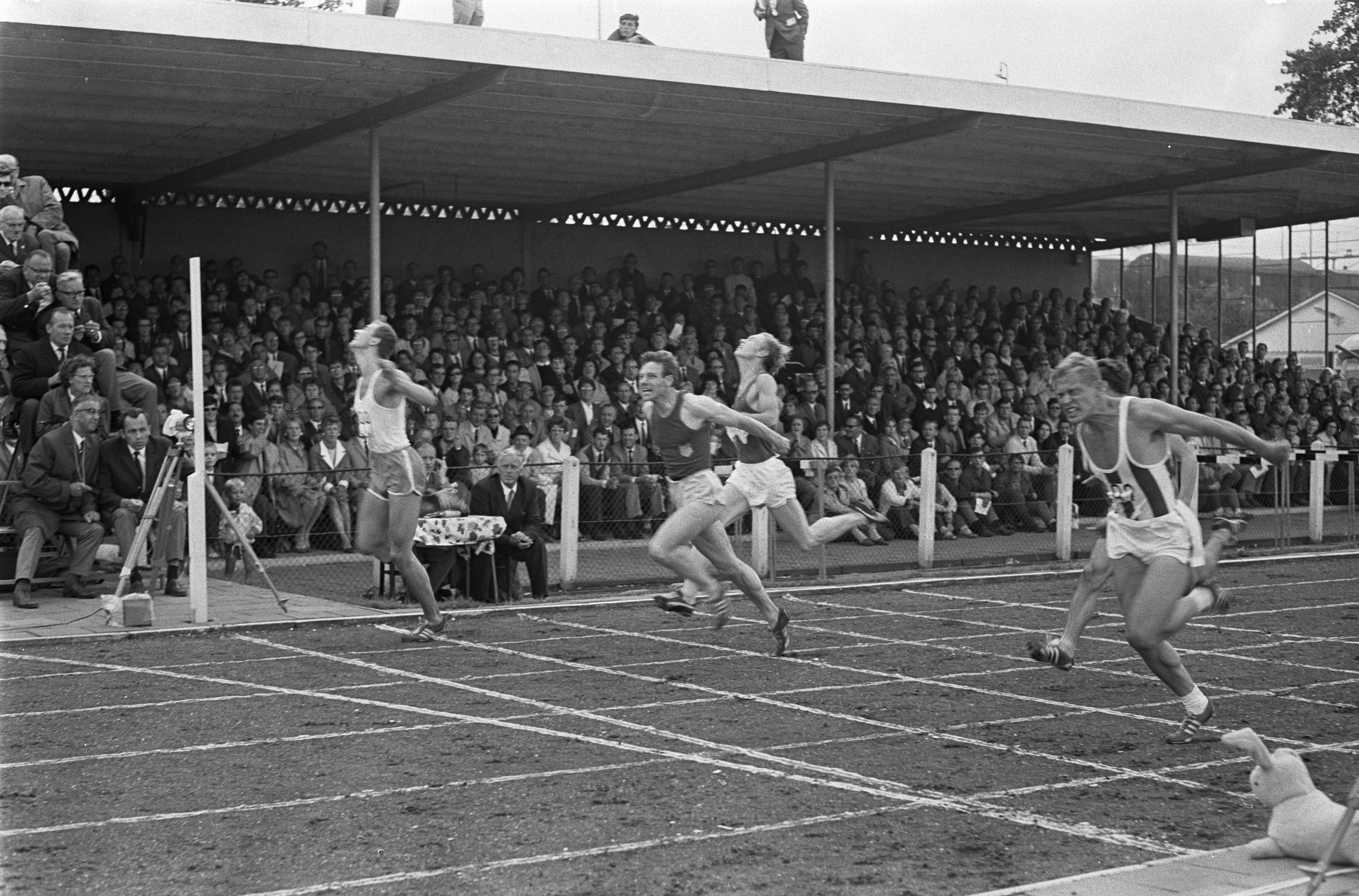
Finish of the men's 100 metres in 1967

The Dutch Athletics Championships (Dutch: Nederlandse kampioenschappen atletiek) is an annual outdoor track and field competition organised by the Royal Dutch Athletics Federation, which serves as the national championship for the sport in the Netherlands. It is typically held as a two- or three-day event in the Dutch summer, ranging from late June to early August. The venue of the championships varies, though Amsterdam's Olympic Stadium has been a regular host.

Established in 1910 as a men-only competition, the programme expanded to include women's events in 1921.

== Events ==
The current track and field programme features a total of 38 individual Dutch Championship athletics events, divided evenly between the sexes.

Track running

- 100 metres, 200 metres, 400 metres, 800 metres, 1500 metres, 5000 metres, 10,000 metres

Obstacle events

- 100 metres hurdles (women only), 110 metres hurdles (men only), 400 metres hurdles, 3000 metres steeplechase

Jumping events

- Pole vault, high jump, long jump, triple jump

Throwing events

- Shot put, discus throw, javelin throw, hammer throw

Combined events

- Decathlon (men only), heptathlon (women only)

Men competed in the 200 metres hurdles up to the 1978 championships and women competed in that discipline in 1973 only. On some occasions, national club competitions in 4 × 100 metres relay and 4 × 400 metres relay are contested at the national championships.

The women's programme expanded inline with international acceptance of women's athletics. The women's 1500 metres was added in 1967 and 3000 metres followed in 1974 (and remained on the programme up to 1994). The 80 metres hurdles was held until 1968, after which it was replaced by the international standard 100 metres hurdles. A women's 400 m hurdles was first held in 1976. The last women's pentathlon was contested in 1980 and was then replaced by the new heptathlon event. The women's equivalents of the men's standard 5000 m and 10,000 m were added in 1981. Later additions to the women's programme were triple jump (1991), pole vault and hammer throw (1995) and the steeplechase (2002) – the final addition bringing women to parity of events in track and field.

Dutch championships in cross country running, racewalking, the half marathon, marathon, 100 kilometres run and 24-hour run are all conducted separately.

== Editions ==
The 1925 championships in Eindhoven. (Polygoonjournaal)

Footage from the 1942 championships in Eindhoven. (Polygoonjournaal)

Footage from the 1963 championships in Rotterdam. Polygoonjournaal)

Year	Date	Venue	Place
1911	11 June; 20 August; 28 August; 10 September		Breda; The Hague; Zwolle; Arnhem
1938	7 August		Deventer
1939	29 and 30 July		Rotterdam (shot put in The Hague)
1940	10 and 11 August		Amsterdam
1960	23 and 24 July		Eindhoven
1961	29 and 30 July		Vlaardingen
1962	11 and 12 August		Amsterdam
1963	10 and 11 August		Rotterdam
1964	22 and 23 August		Beverwijk
1965	14 and 15 August		Groningen
1966	6 and 7 August		Amsterdam
1967	12 and 13 August		Rotterdam
1968	3 and 4 August		Groningen
1969	2 and 3 August		Groningen
1970	25 and 26 July		Haarlem
1971	3 and 4 July		Drachten
1972	4 to 6 August		Kerkrade
1973	14 and 15 July		the Hague
1974	2 to 4 August		Arnhem
1975	5 and 6 July		Arnhem
1976	21 and 22 August		the Hague
1977	8 to 10 July		Sittard
1978	4 to 6 August		Groningen
1979	10 to 12 August		Nijmegen
1980	8 to 10 August		Sittard
1981	8 and 9 August		Utrecht
1982	7 and 8 August		Amsterdam
1983	23 and 24 July		Vught
1984	23 and 24 June		Sittard
1985	6 and 7 July		Zwolle
1986	12 and 13 July		Amsterdam
1987	11 and 12 July		Leiden
1988	16 and 17 July		Groningen
1989	7 to 9 July		Hengelo
1990	13 to 15 July		Rotterdam
1991	26 to 28 July		Eindhoven
1992	3 to 5 July		Helmond
1993	23 to 25 July		Amsterdam
1994	15 to 17 July		Assen
1995	14 to 16 July		Bergen op Zoom
1996	31 May to 2 June		the Hague
1997	4 to 6 July		Emmeloord
1998	10 to 12 July		Groningen
1999	26 and 27 June		Apeldoorn
2000	15 and 16 July	Olympic Stadium	Amsterdam
2001	7 and 8 July		Tilburg
2002	6 and 7 July		Sittard
2003	12 and 13 July	Olympic Stadium	Amsterdam
2004	10 and 11 July		Utrecht
2005	9 and 10 July	Olympic Stadium	Amsterdam
2006	8 and 9 July	Olympic Stadium	Amsterdam
2007	30 June and 1 July	Olympic Stadium	Amsterdam
2008	5 and 6 July	Olympic Stadium	Amsterdam
2009	1 and 2 August	Olympic Stadium	Amsterdam
2010	17 and 18 July	Olympic Stadium	Amsterdam
2011	30 and 31 July	Olympic Stadium	Amsterdam
2012	16 and 17 June	Olympic Stadium	Amsterdam
2013	20 and 21 July	Olympic Stadium	Amsterdam
2014	26 and 27 July	Olympic Stadium	Amsterdam
2015	30 July to 2 August	Olympic Stadium	Amsterdam
2016	16 to 19 June	Olympic Stadium	Amsterdam
2017	14 to 16 July	Sportpark Maarschalkerweerd	Utrecht
2018	21 to 24 July	Sportpark Maarschalkerweerd	Utrecht
2019	25 to 28 July	Sportpark Laan van Poot	The Hague
2020	29 to 30 August	Sportpark Maarschalkerweerd	Utrecht
2021	24 to 27 June	Sportcomplex Dr Schaepmanlaan	Breda
2022	24 to 26 June	Sportpark Orderbos	Apeldoorn
2023	28 to 30 July	Sportcomplex Dr Schaepmanlaan	Breda
2024	28 to 30 June	Fanny Blankers-Koen Stadion	Hengelo
2025	2 to 3 August	Fanny Blankers-Koen Stadion	Hengelo
2026	25 to 26 July	Fanny Blankers-Koen Stadion	Hengelo

== Championship records ==
=== Men ===
Event	Record	Athlete	Club	Location	Date	Ref.
100 m	10.00 (+1.5 m/s)	Nsikak Ekpo	HAAG Athletics	Hengelo	25 July 2026	
200 m	20.11	Churandy Martina	Rotterdam Athletics	Amsterdam	19 June 2016	
400 m	44.93	Jonas Phijffers	AV '34	Hengelo	26 July 2026	
800 m	1:45.25	Thijmen Kupers	Groningen Athletics	Amsterdam	19 June 2016	
1500 m	3:35.80	Stefan Nillessen	AV Cifla	Hengelo	30 June 2024	
5000 m	13:34.62	Kamiel Maase	Leiden Athletics	Utrecht	11 July 2004	
10,000 m	27:50.50	Jos Hermens	KNAU	Groningen	4 August 1978	
110 m hurdles	13.44	Robin Korving	AV Hera	Amsterdam	16 July 2000	
400 m hurdles	48.73	Harry Schulting	Prins Hendrik	Nijmegen	12 August 1979	
3000 m steeplechase	8:20.61	Simon Vroemen	A.V. Sprint	Amsterdam	8 July 2006	
4 × 100 m	40.64		AAC	Assen	17 July 1974	
4 × 400 m	2:58.22		AAC	Rotterdam	15 July 1990	
20 km walk	1:27:48.1	Harold van Beek	RWV	Bergen op Zoom	15 July 1995	
High jump	2.26 m	Ruud Wielart	AV Haarlem	Nijmegen	12 August 1979	
Pole vault	5.84 m	Menno Vloon	AV Lycurgus	Hengelo	30 June 2024	
Long jump	8.19 m	Emiel Mellaard	AAC	Groningen	17 July 1988	
Triple jump	16.65 m	Fabian Florant	HAAG Athletics	Amsterdam	2 August 2015	
Shot put	21.02 m	Rutger Smith	Groningen Athletics	Amsterdam	8 July 2006	
Discus throw	67.21 m	Ruben Rolvink	Olympus '70	Hengelo	25 July 2026	
Hammer throw	73.55 m	Denzel Comenentia	AAC	Hengelo	28 June 2024	
Javelin throw	79.55 m	Ryan Jansen	AV Spado	Hengelo	26 July 2026	
Decathlon	8447 pts	Robert de Wit	PSV Athletics	Eindhoven	22 May 1988	

=== Women ===
Event	Record	Athlete	Club	Date	Location	Ref.
100 m	11.02	Dafne Schippers	Hellas Utrecht	31 July 2015	Amsterdam	
200 m	22.62 (+1.9 m/s)	Tasa Jiya	AV Lycurgus	30 June 2024	Hengelo	
400 m	51.09	Myrte van der Schoot	GAC Hilversum	26 July 2026	Hengelo	
800 m	2:01.07	Sanne Verstegen	Rotterdam Athletics	27 July 2014	Amsterdam	
1500 m	4:11.47	Britt Ummels	AV Unitas	28 July 2019	The Hague	
5000 m	15:15.70	Diane van Es	PAC	28 June 2024	Hengelo	
10,000 m	32:20.37	Lornah Kiplagat	AV Hylas	25 May 2006	Vught	
100 m hurdles	12.65 (+0.6 m/s)	Nadine Visser	Streker Atletiek Vereniging	26 July 2026	Hengelo	
400 m hurdles	54.95	Cathelijn Peeters	Prins Hendrik	29 July 2023	Breda	
3000 m steeplechase	9:43.26	Irene van der Reijken	Rotterdam Athletics	25 June 2021	Breda	
4 × 100 m	45.31		Eindhoven Athletics	2 August 2015	Amsterdam	
4 × 400 m	3:42.85		Rotterdam Athletics	19 July 2016	Amsterdam	
High jump	1.91 m	Nadine Broersen	A.V. Sprint	27 July 2014	Amsterdam	
High jump	1.91 m	Britt Weerman	Groningen Athletics	29 June 2024	Hengelo	
Pole vault	4.56 m	Marijn Kieft	AAV '36	25 July 2026	Hengelo	
Long jump	6.78 m (±0.0 m/s)	Dafne Schippers	Hellas Utrecht	26 July 2014	Amsterdam	
Triple jump	13.51 m (+1.9 m/s)	Kellynsia Leerdam	AAC	2 August 2025	Hengelo	
Shot put	20.58 m	Jessica Schilder	AV Hera	26 July 2026	Hengelo	
Discus throw	65.12 m	Jorinde van Klinken	Groningen Athletics	26 July 2026	Hengelo	
Hammer throw	64.77 m	Wendy Koolhaas	Groningen Athletics	29 August 2020	Utrecht	
Javelin throw	59.53 m	Lisanne Schol	AV Lycurgus	30 August 2020	Utrecht	
Heptathlon	6213 pts	Marjon Wijnsma	Olympia	22 May 1988	Eindhoven	

== See also ==
- List of Dutch records in athletics
