= Jill Holterman =

Dutch long-distance runner (born 1991)

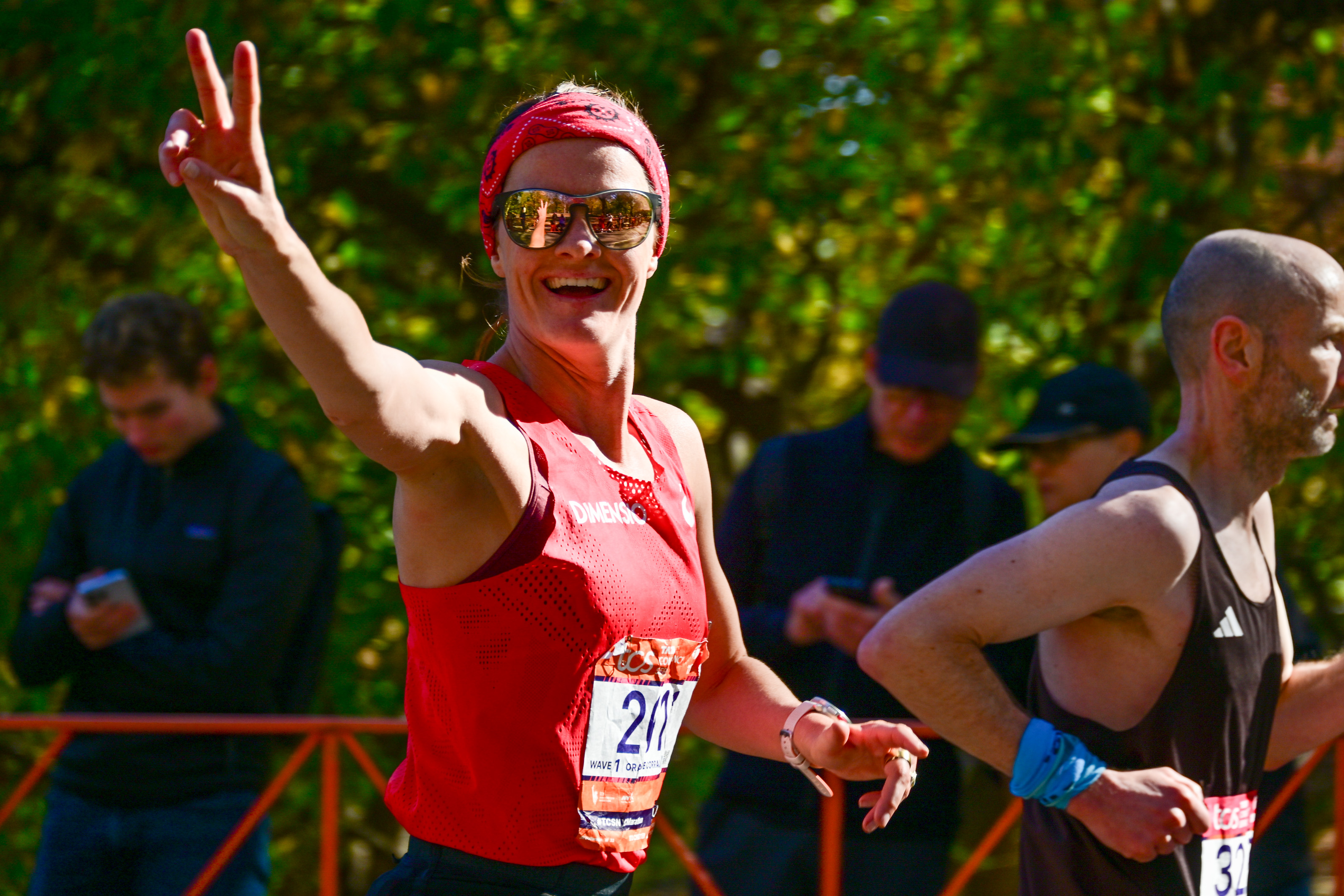
- Jill Holterman at the 2024 New York City Marathon.

Personal information
- Born: 11 September 1991 (age 34) Zaandam, Netherlands

Sport
- Country: Netherlands
- Sport: Athletics
- Event: Long-distance running

Jill Holterman (born 11 September 1991 in Zaandam) is a Dutch long-distance runner.

Jill Holterman qualified herself on 18 April 2021 in the Enschede Marathon for the 2020 Olympics with a personal best of 2h28:18.
