= Job Geerds =

Dutch hurdler (born 2002)

Personal information
- Nationality: Dutch
- Born: 12 July 2002 (age 24)

Sport
- Sport: Athletics
- Events: 60m hurdles, 110 metres hurdles

Achievements and titles
- Personal bests: 60m hurdles: 7.54 (Apeldoorn, 2025); 110m hurdles 13.52 (Jöhvi, 2024)

Job Geerds (born 12 July 2002) is a Dutch track and field athlete. He is a Dutch national champion over 60m hurdles (2023–2025). He competed at the 2024 World Athletics Indoor Championships.

== Early life ==
From Amsterdam, he started training in Athletics from an early age and initially ran cross-country before a growth spurt led him towards hurdles. He started at the local track at AV'1923, where he is still actively training under the supervision of coach Sylvester Tanoh. Sylvester has been his coach for over 7 years. He studied Social Legal Services at the Amsterdam University of Applied Sciences.

== Career ==
He won the Dutch national title in 60m hurdles in Apeldoorn in 2023. In December 2023 in Navarro he lowered his personal best to 7.64 seconds. The next month he had lowered his personal best to 7.63 seconds in Dortmund. He retained his Dutch national title in February 2024 with a personal best time of 7.57 seconds. He was selected the 2024 World Athletics Championships in Glasgow, Scotland, where he qualified for the semi-finals.

He was selected for the 110 metres hurdles at the 2024 European Athletics Championships in Rome, Italy. However, after completing four hurdles in his opening race, he suffered a hamstring injury which prevented him from completing the rest of the outdoor season.

He retained his Dutch indoor 60m hurdles title in February 2025. He was selected for the 2025 European Athletics Indoor Championships in Apeldoorn. He ran a seasons best 7.60 seconds to qualify for the semi-finals, and a personal best 7.54 seconds to qualify for the final. He then placed fifth overall with a run of 7.61 seconds in the final.

He qualified for the semi-finals whilst competing at the 2025 World Athletics Championships in the men's 110 metres hurdles in Tokyo, Japan, in September 2025, but had to withdraw prior to his semi-final.

Geerds won the 60 metres hurdles in 7.68 seconds at the 2026 Dutch Indoor Athletics Championships in Apeldoorn.
