= Mike Foppen =

Dutch long-distance runner

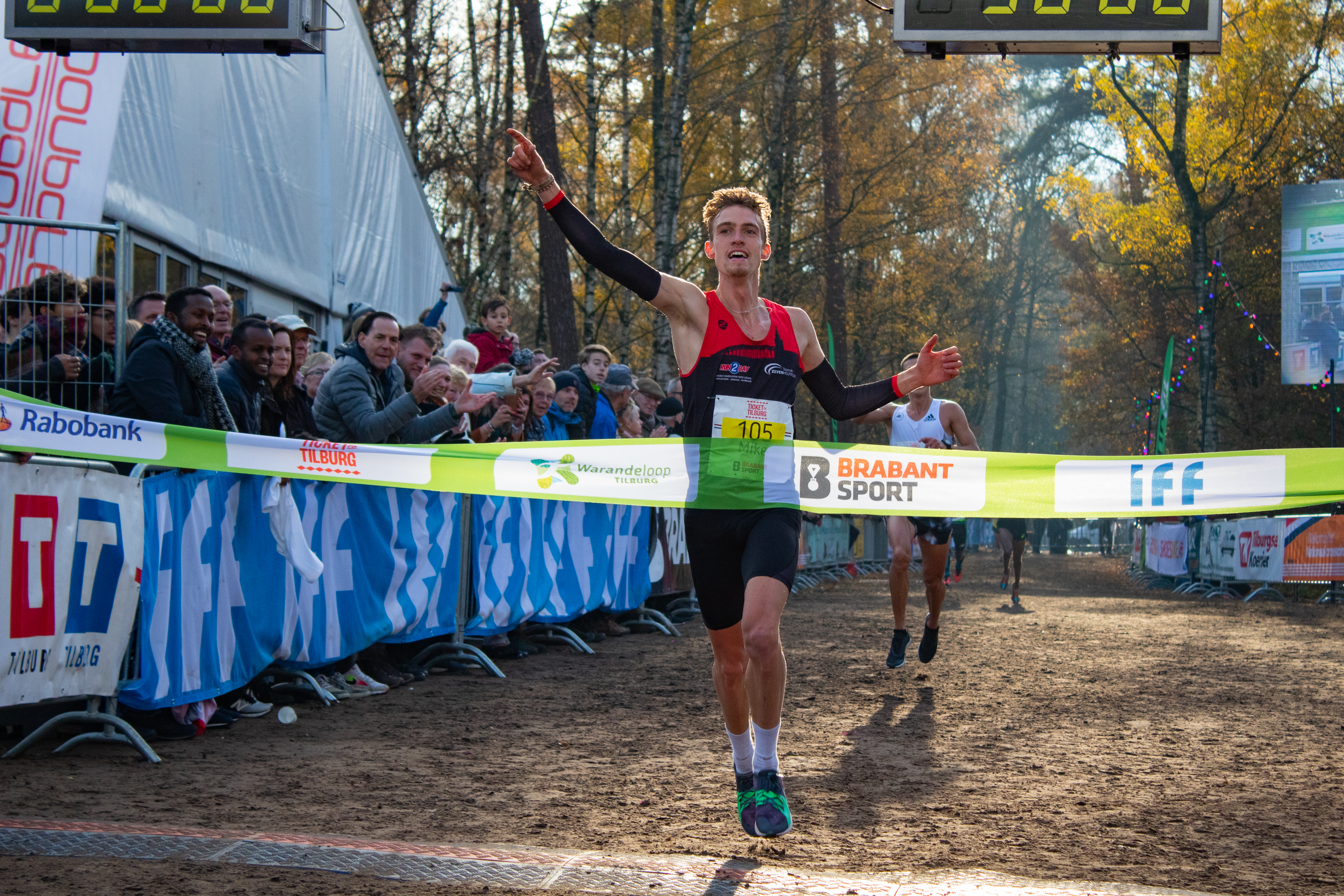

Personal information
- Born: 29 November 1996 (age 29) Nijmegen, Netherlands

Sport
- Country: Netherlands
- Sport: Athletics
- Events: Middle-, Long-distance running
- Coached by: Joshua Mols

Mike Foppen (Dutch: [mɑik ˈfɔpə(n)]; born 29 November 1996) is a Dutch middle- and long-distance runner. He finished fifth in the 5000 metres at the 2022 European Athletics Championships.

Foppen represented Netherlands in the event at the 2020 Tokyo Olympics. At the 2024 Summer Olympics he finished 13th in the Athletics at the 2024 Summer Olympics – Men's 5000 metres finals.

He is the Dutch record holder for the 5000 m and the Dutch indoor record holder for the 3000 m and 5000 m (his mark is an outright national best). He won seven national titles.

== Achievements ==
=== Personal bests ===
- 1500 metres – 3:35.67 (Pfungstadt 2022)
  - 1500 metres indoor – 3:40.34 (Metz 2023)
- 2000 metres – 4:58.92 (Bern 2020)
  - 2000 metres indoor – 5:04.10 (Liévin 2022) NB
- 3000 metres – 7:34.47 (Chorzów 2024) NR
  - 3000 metres indoor – 7:42.55 (Liévin 2021) NR
- 5000 metres – 13:02.43 (Stockholm 2025) NR
  - 5000 metres indoor – 13:11.60 (Boston, MA 2023) NR
- 10,000 metres – 27:20.52 (The TEN 2026)

=== National titles ===
- Dutch Athletics Championships
  - 1500 metres: 2016
  - 5000 metres: 2019, 2020, 2021
- Dutch Indoor Athletics Championships
  - 3000 metres: 2019, 2020, 2021
