= Britt Ummels =

Dutch middle-distance runner

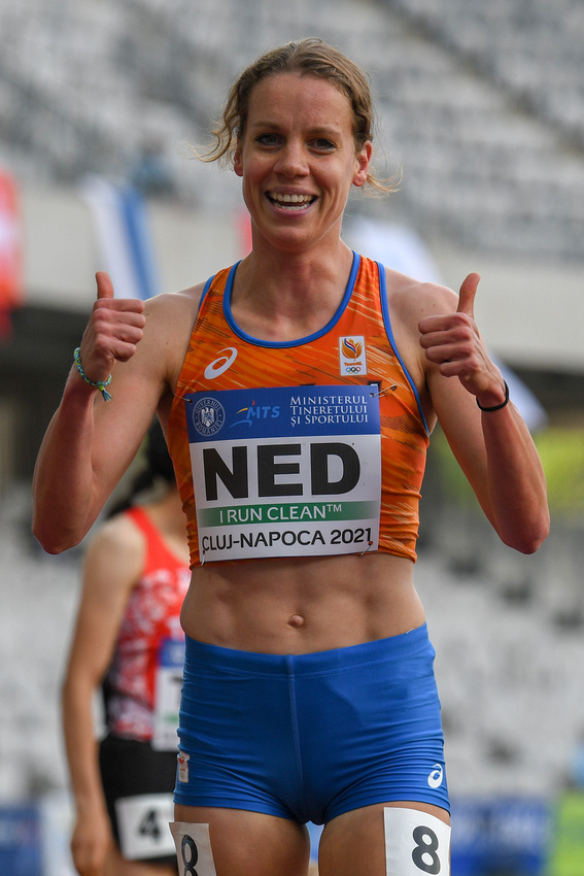
- 2021 European Team Championships

Personal information
- Nationality: Dutch
- Born: 24 August 1993 (age 32)

Sport
- Sport: Athletics
- Event: 800 metres

Britt Ummels (born 24 August 1993) is a Dutch athlete. She competed in the women's 800 metres event at the 2021 European Athletics Indoor Championships.
