= Royal Dutch Athletics Federation =

Governing body for the athletics in the Netherlands

- Koninklijke Nederlandse Atletiek Unie
- Sport: Athletics
- Abbreviation: KNAU
- Founded: 1901
- Affiliation: WA
- Regional affiliation: EAA
- Headquarters: Arnhem, Netherlands
- President: Theo Hoex
- Secretary: Jan Willem Landré
- Sponsor: Asics, AA-Drink

Official website
- www.atletiekunie.nl
- (Netherlands)

The Royal Dutch Athletics Federation (Dutch: Koninklijke Nederlandse Atletiek Unie or Atletiekunie) is the governing body for the sport of athletics in the Netherlands.

The federation was founded in 1901. It has been organizing the Dutch Athletics Championships since 1910 and the Dutch Indoor Athletics Championships since 1969. Furthermore, it maintains the Dutch records in athletics and awards the Dutch Athlete of the Year.

The federation is affiliated with World Athletics (WA), European Athletic Association (EAA), and Dutch Olympic Committee-National Sports Federation (NOC*NSF).
