= Omnisport Apeldoorn =

Sports arena in Apeldoorn, the Netherlands

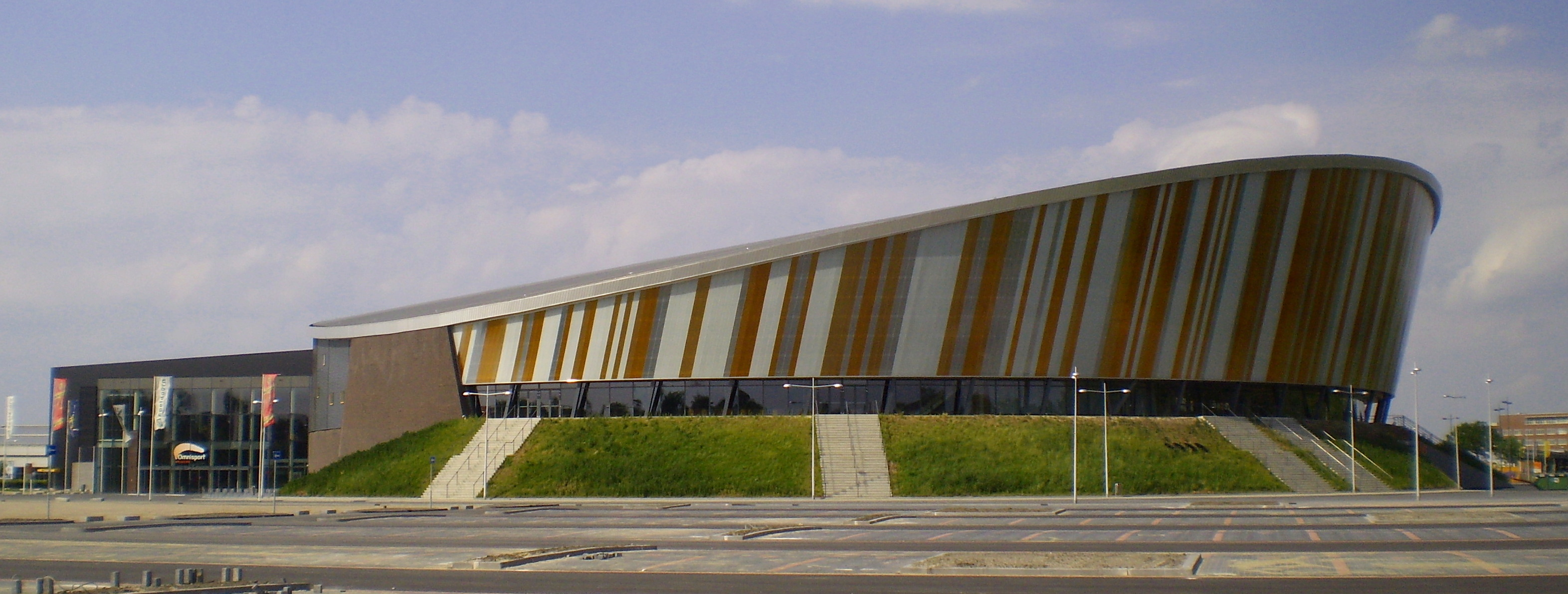
- Interactive map of Omnisport Apeldoorn
- Full name: Omnisport Apeldoorn
- Location: Apeldoorn, the Netherlands
- Coordinates: 52°12′29.16″N 5°59′46.92″E
- Operator: Libéma
- Capacity: 5,000 (cycling hall); 2,000 (volleyball hall)
- Event: sporting events
- Field shape: oval (cycling hall) rectangular (volleyball hall)

Construction
- Groundbreaking: 24 May 2006
- Built: 2006–2008
- Opened: 14 November 2008
- Renovated: 2016
- Cost: € 58.4 million
- Architect: FaulknerBrowns

Tenant
- SV Dynamo (volleyball)

Website
- omnisport.nl

The Omnisport Apeldoorn, also known as the Omnisportcentrum or simply called Omnisport, is a velodrome and multisport indoor arena in Apeldoorn, the Netherlands.

Designed by FaulknerBrowns Architects the facility opened in 2008, it is divided into two halls: a cycling hall containing 250 m (820 ft) cycling track and 200 m (660 ft) athletics track, and a volleyball hall. The cycling hall has a capacity for 5,000 spectators and the volleyball hall for 2,000. The complex has been operated by Libéma since 2012.

== Usage and events ==
In addition to its function as sports accommodation, Omnisport is used for business events such as fairs, congresses and meetings, and various public events such as music concerts. In 2013, a wing was added to the center that houses the De Voorwaarts shopping center. Besides the Omnisport Centre, there is a skating rink. It was designed to be used as an ice-skating rink for six weeks every winter.

=== Sporting ===
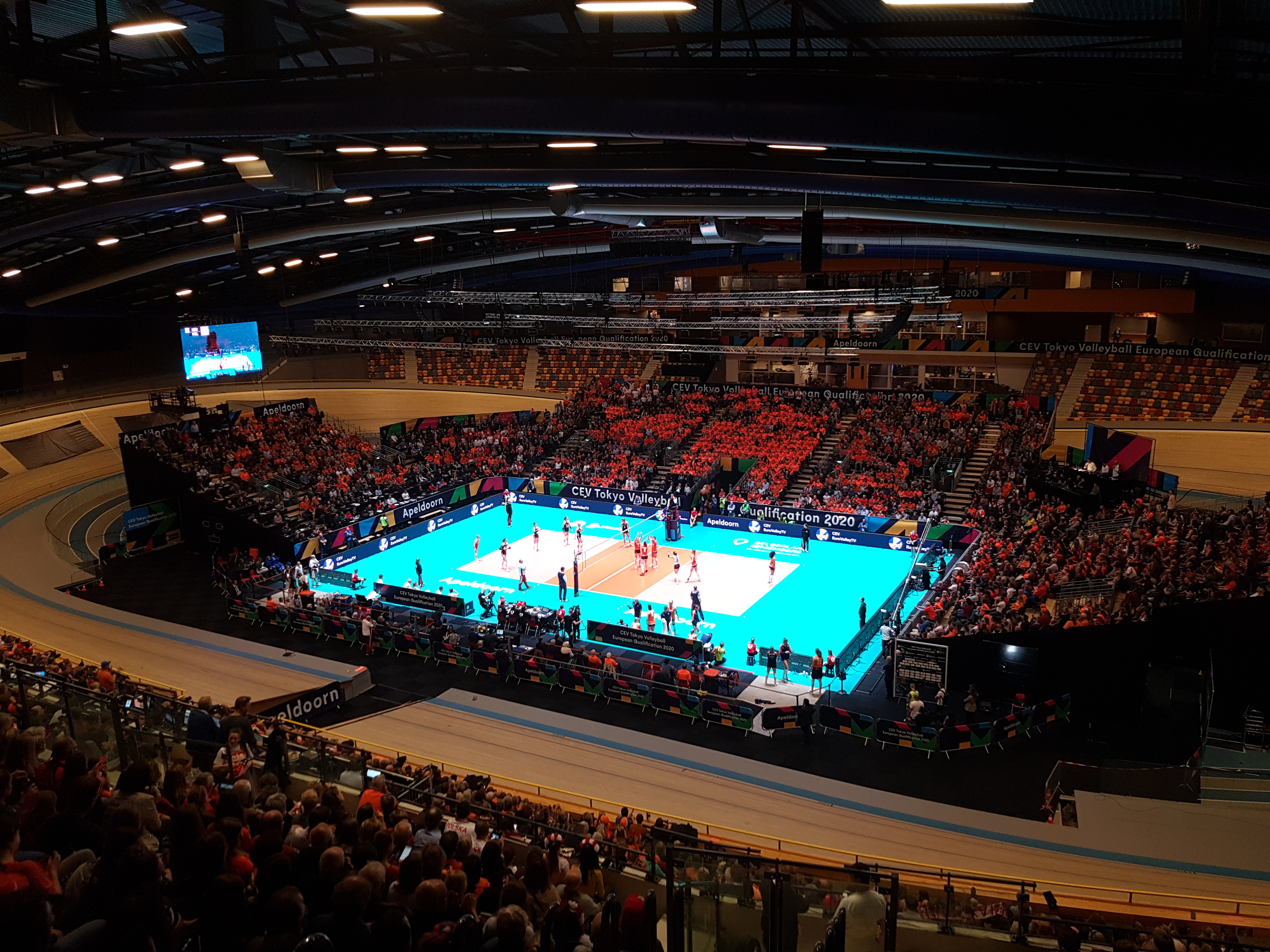
The velodrome hosting volleyball

Omnisport Apeldoorn is used during the day by educational institution ROC Aventus and has been the home of volleyball club SV Dynamo. The cycling hall was the host of the 2011 UCI Track Cycling World Championships, 2015 UCI Track Para-Cycling World Championships, in May 2016 it hosted the opening time-trial stage of the 2016 Giro d'Italia, and in 2018 it hosted the 2018 UCI Track Cycling World Championships.

For athletics the main hall is used for the Dutch Indoor Athletics Championships and smaller competitions since 2009. In 2025 it hosted the European Athletics Indoor Championships.

Major volleyball events are held in the cycling hall, setting up the court and temporary grandstands in the central area of the velodrome, and can have a capacity of between 5,000 and 6,500 spectators. In the volleyball competitions, this arena was one of the venues of the 2015 Women's European Volleyball Championship, 2019 Men's European Volleyball Championship, and the final round of the 2022 FIVB Volleyball Women's World Championship.

== Renovation ==
The cycling track was put out of order in 2014 to investigate and repair excessive splintering of its wooden surface. New incidents in 2015 again resulted in closing the track, eventually leading to the decision by the city council to replace the track surface completely. The total cost of this replacement plus additional improvements of the building's installations amounted to € 1.7 million. The new track officially opened on September 5, 2016.

In the summer of 2024 the athletics track was renovated with an optimized layout and new surface layer, in preparation for the European Athletics Indoor Championships in 2025.

== See also ==
- List of cycling tracks and velodromes
- List of indoor arenas in the Netherlands

Events and tenants
Preceded by Topsporthal Vlaanderen, Ghent, Belgium	Dutch Indoor Athletics Championships; Venue; 2009–2024	Most recent
Preceded by Ballerup Super Arena; Ballerup, Copenhagen	UCI Track Cycling World Championships; Venue; 2011	Succeeded by Hisense Arena; Melbourne
Preceded by Hong Kong Velodrome; Hong Kong	UCI Track Cycling World Championships; Venue; 2018	Succeeded by BGŻ Arena; Pruszków
Preceded by BGŻ Arena; Pruszków	European Track Championships; Venue; 2011	Succeeded by Cido Arena; Panevėžys
Preceded by Cido Arena; Panevėžys	European Track Championships; Venue; 2013	Succeeded by Vélodrome Amédée Détraux; Baie-Mahault
Preceded by Sir Chris Hoy Velodrome; Glasgow	European Track Championships; Venue; 2019	Succeeded by Kolodruma; Plovdiv
Preceded by Tissot Velodrome; Grenchen	European Track Championships; Venue; 2024	Succeeded by Velodroom Limburg; Heusden-Zolder
Preceded by Ataköy Athletics Arena; Istanbul	European Athletics Indoor Championships; Venue; 2025	Succeeded by Luis Puig Palace; Valencia
