= 2023 European Athletics Indoor Championships – Women's 4 × 400 metres relay =

Women's 4 × 400 metres relay at the 2023 European Athletics Indoor Championships
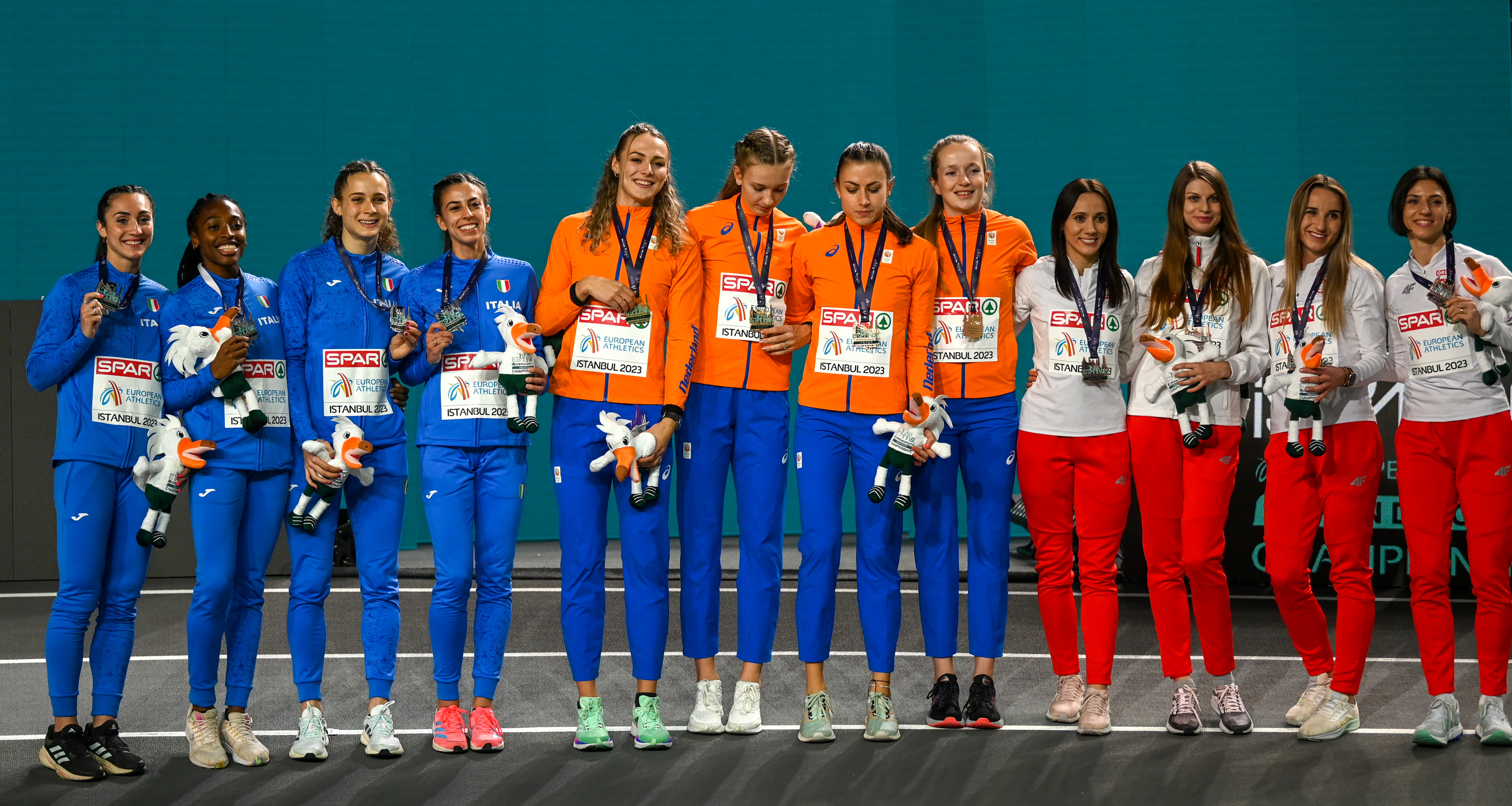
- Medaling relay teams of Italy (silver), the Netherlands (gold), and Poland (bronze)
- Venue: Ataköy Athletics Arena
- Location: Istanbul, Turkey
- Dates: 5 March 2023 (final)
- Teams: 6 nations
- Winning time: 3:25.66 min CR NR

Medalists
| gold medal | Lieke Klaver; Eveline Saalberg; Cathelijn Peeters; Femke Bol | Netherlands |
| silver medal | Alice Mangione; Ayomide Folorunso; Anna Polinari; Eleonora Marchiando | Italy |
| bronze medal | Anna Kiełbasińska; Marika Popowicz-Drapała; Alicja Wrona-Kutrzepa; Anna Pałys | Poland |

The women's 4 × 400 metres relay at the 2023 European Athletics Indoor Championships took place over one round in the Ataköy Athletics Arena in Istanbul, Turkey, on 5 March 2023. This was the twelfth time the women's 4 × 400 metres relay was contested at the European Athletics Indoor Championships. Six national teams qualified based on their outdoor results from 2022 or the team's cumulative individual 400 metres indoor results from 2023.

The team of the Netherlands led the race from the first leg onwards and won in a championship record and Dutch national record of 3:25.66 minutes, successfully defending their 2021 title. They were followed by the team of Italy, who ran an Italian national record of 3:28.61 minutes for second place, and the team of Poland, who ran a time of 3:29.31 minutes for third place.

== Background ==
In the women's 4 × 400 metres relay indoors, teams consist of four female athletes, who successively run two laps on a 200-metre track and pass on a baton between them. The event was introduced at the 2000 edition of the European Athletics Indoor Championships and had been contested eleven times before 2023. The 2023 edition was held at the Ataköy Athletics Arena, an indoor track and field arena in the Ataköy quarter in Bakırköy, Istanbul, Turkey.

At the start of these championships, the world and European record was 3:23.37 min set by Russia's team in 2006. The championship record was 3:27.15 min set by the Dutch team in 2021, making them the defending champions. The 2023 world leading time was 3:26.40 min set by the team of the Arkansas Razorbacks representing the University of Arkansas and the 2023 European leading time was 3:37.11 min set by the Hungarian national team.

Records before the 2023 European Athletics Indoor Championships
| Record | Team | Time | Location | Date |
|---|---|---|---|---|
| World record | Russia | 3:23.37 | Glasgow, United Kingdom | 28 January 2006 |
| European record | Russia | 3:23.37 | Glasgow, United Kingdom | 28 January 2006 |
| Championship record | Netherlands | 3:27.15 | Toruń, Poland | 7 March 2021 |
| World leading | Arkansas Razorbacks | 3:26.40 | Fayetteville, Arkansas, United States | 28 January 2023 |
| European leading | Hungary | 3:37.11 | Nyíregyháza, Hungary | 28 January 2023 |

== Qualification ==
For the women's 4 × 400 metres relay, a maximum of six teams could participate. The team of the host country was offered a place, but Turkey did not to participate in this relay. Three teams qualified based on their 2022 outdoor results in this event, and the remaining three teams qualified based on the team's cumulative individual 2023 indoor results in the 400 metres from the 2023 indoor season until 20 February 2023. A final entry list including thirty-one athletes of six nations was published on 23 February 2023.

== Final ==
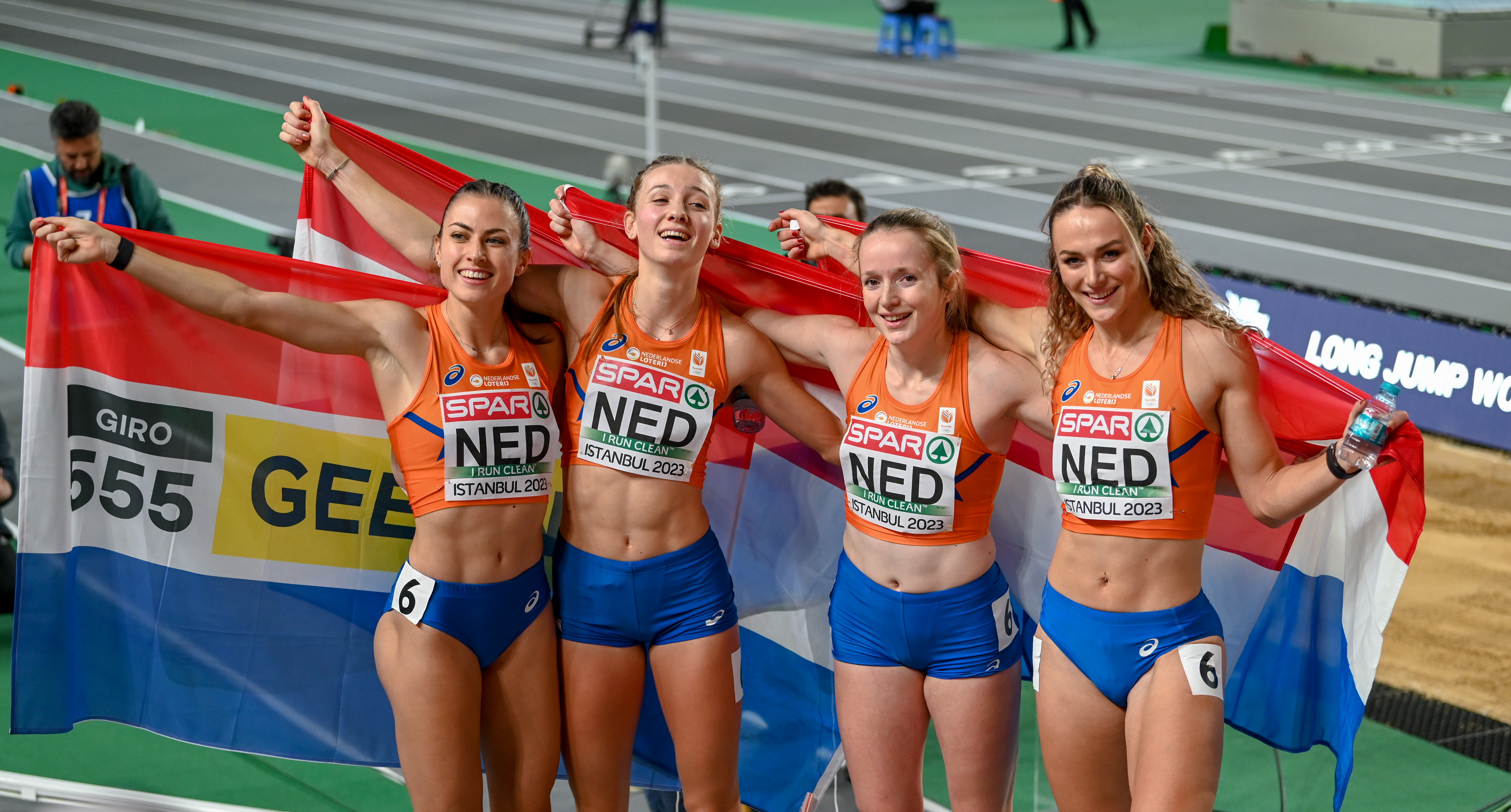
Eveline Saalberg, Femke Bol, Cathelijn Peeters, and Lieke Klaver of the Netherlands celebrating after winning the race

The race was held on 5 March 2023 at 19:25 (UTC+3) in the evening. After 200 metres, individual 400 m silver medalist Lieke Klaver of the Netherlands was in the lead, followed by individual bronze medalist Anna Kiełbasińska of Poland and Alice Mangione of Italy, until they handed their batons over to Eveline Saalberg of the Netherlands, Marika Popowicz-Drapała of Poland, and Ayomide Folorunso of Italy, who maintained the running order during the second leg. Third-leg runner Cathelijn Peeters of the Netherlands kept her nation in the lead, but metres before the last hand-over Anna Polinari of Italy passed Alicja Wrona-Kutrzepa of Poland. In the anchor leg, individual gold medalist Femke Bol of the Netherlands, Eleonora Marchiando of Italy, and Anna Pałys of Poland ran their laps in that order. The gold medal was won by the team of the Netherlands, breaking their championship record (CR) and national record (NR) in a time of 3:25.66 min and successfully defending their 2021 title. About three seconds later, they were followed by the silver medal-winning team of Italy, who ran a national record (NR) of 3:28.61 min, and then the bronze medal-winning team of Poland, who ran a season best (SB) of 3:29.31 min.

For Athletics Weekly, Tim Allen wrote: "When Femke Bol anchored a Dutch 4×400 m team that were already in the lead at 1200 m, courtesy of the work from Lieke Klaver, Eveline Saalberg and Cathelijn Peeters, the result was a foregone conclusion." Dutch newspaper Algemeen Dagblad described that Bol pulled away "with a superior acceleration" during the final leg. In interviews after the race, Bol said: "I had never before started in first position at the end of the 4 × 400 metres." and "I achieved everything I wanted this [indoor] season, could not ask for more." And Klaver said: "We have a good team. The reserve runners are also fast. That keeps everyone sharp."

Results of the final
| Rank | Nation | Athletes | Time | Note |
|---|---|---|---|---|
| 1st place, gold medalist(s) | Netherlands | Lieke Klaver; Eveline Saalberg; Cathelijn Peeters; Femke Bol | 3:25.66 | CR NR |
| 2nd place, silver medalist(s) | Italy | Alice Mangione; Ayomide Folorunso; Anna Polinari; Eleonora Marchiando | 3:28.61 | NR |
| 3rd place, bronze medalist(s) | Poland | Anna Kiełbasińska; Marika Popowicz-Drapała; Alicja Wrona-Kutrzepa; Anna Pałys | 3:29.31 | SB |
| 4 | Czech Republic | Tereza Petržilková; Marcela Píriková; Nikola Bendová; Lada Vondrová | 3:31.26 | SB |
| 5 | Ireland | Sophie Becker; Sharlene Mawdsley; Cliodhna Manning; Phil Healy | 3:32.61 | SB |
| 6 | (United Kingdom) Great Britain & N.I. | Hanna Kelly; Catys McAulay; Nicole Kendall; Mary Abichi | 3:32.65 | SB |
