= Lieke Klaver =

Dutch sprinter (born 1998)

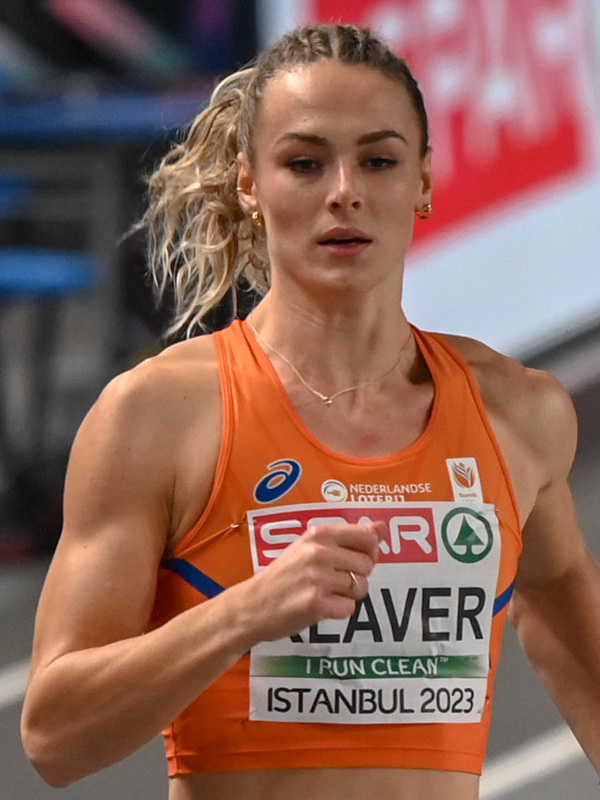
- Klaver at the 2023 European Indoor Championships in Istanbul

Personal information
- Born: 20 August 1998 (age 28) Velsen-Zuid, Netherlands
- Height: 1.82 m (6 ft 0 in)

Sport
- Sport: Track and field
- Events: 100 m, 200 m, 400 m, 4 × 100 m relay, 4 × 400 m relay
- Club: Streker Atletiek Vereniging
- Coached by: Rogier Ummels 2017–2019, Laurent Meuwly 2019–now

Achievements and titles
- Highest world ranking: No. 3 (400 m, 2024); No. 13 (200 m, 2024); No. 55 (overall, 2024)
- Personal bests: 100 m: 11.33 (2023); 200 m: 22.46 (2023); 400 m: 49.58 (2024); Short track; 200 m: 22.81 i (2024); 400 m: 50.10 i (2024)
Medal record summary
Women's athletics
Representing Netherlands
Event	1st	2nd	3rd
Olympic Games	1	1	0
World Championships	1	2	1
World Indoor Championships	1	3	1
World Relays	0	1	0
European Championships	2	0	4
European Indoor Championships	4	1	0
European Games	2	0	0
Total	11	8	6
Event	1st	2nd	3rd
200 m	1	0	0
400 m	1	2	3
4 × 100 m relay	1	0	0
4 × 400 m relay	7	3	1
4 × 400 m mixed	1	3	2
Total	11	8	6
Medal record details
Women's athletics
Representing the Netherlands
Olympic Games
Gold medal – first place	2024 Paris	4 × 400 m mixed
Silver medal – second place	2024 Paris	4 × 400 m relay
World Championships
Gold medal – first place	2023 Budapest	4 × 400 m relay
Silver medal – second place	2022 Eugene	4 × 400 m mixed
Silver medal – second place	2025 Tokyo	4 × 400 m mixed
Bronze medal – third place	2025 Tokyo	4 × 400 m relay
World Indoor Championships
Gold medal – first place	2024 Glasgow	4 × 400 m relay
Silver medal – second place	2022 Belgrade	4 × 400 m relay
Silver medal – second place	2024 Glasgow	400 m
Silver medal – second place	2026 Toruń	4 × 400 m relay
Bronze medal – third place	2026 Toruń	400 m
World Athletics Relays
Silver medal – second place	2024 Nassau	4 × 400 m mixed
European Championships
Gold medal – first place	2022 Munich	4 × 400 m relay
Gold medal – first place	2024 Rome	4 × 400 m relay
Gold medal – first place	2026 Birmingham	4 × 400 m relay
Bronze medal – third place	2024 Rome	4 × 400 m mixed
Bronze medal – third place	2024 Rome	400 m
Bronze medal – third place	2026 Birmingham	4 × 400 m mixed
Bronze medal – third place	2026 Birmingham	400 m
European Indoor Championships
Gold medal – first place	2021 Toruń	4 × 400 m relay
Gold medal – first place	2023 Istanbul	4 × 400 m relay
Gold medal – first place	2025 Apeldoorn	400 m
Gold medal – first place	2025 Apeldoorn	4 × 400 m relay
Silver medal – second place	2023 Istanbul	400 m
European Games
Gold medal – first place	2023 Chorzów	200 m
Gold medal – first place	2023 Chorzów	4 × 100 m relay

Lieke Klaver (pronounced [ˈlikə] [ˈklaːvər]; born 20 August 1998) is a Dutch track and field athlete who competes in sprinting. She specializes in the 200 metres and in the 400 metres. In the 4 × 400 metres relay, she is the 2023 World Champion and the 2024 World Indoor Champion with the Dutch women's team and the 2024 Olympic Champion with the Dutch mixed team.

Klaver represented the Netherlands at the 2020 Tokyo Olympics. She won silver medals in the 400 metres short track at the 2024 World Indoor Championships and at the 2023 European Indoor Championships and a bronze medal in the 400 metres at the 2024 European Championships. She also took four national titles (outdoor and indoor).

She has won eleven major medals as part of the Dutch 4 × 400 m relay teams, either women's or mixed, including silver for the mixed relays at the 2022 World Championships and the 2024 World Athletics Relays and gold for the women's relays at the 2023 World Championships and 2024 World Indoor Championships.

== Early life ==
Lieke Klaver was born on 20 August 1998 in Velsen-Zuid, Netherlands. She has an older brother.

At age 8, she became a member of the athletics club Streker Atletiek Vereniging in Grootebroek.

== Youth and junior career ==
Klaver gained her first international experience at age 15 at the 2014 World Under-20 Championships held in Eugene, Oregon, U.S., where she competed in the 4 × 100 metres relay.

A year later, she reached the final of the 200 metres at the 2015 European U20 Championships in Eskilstuna, Sweden. The Dutch women's 4 × 100 m relay team was disqualified in the final there, but their time from the heats would have given them second place in the final.

She was still a junior when she claimed her first senior Dutch national title, winning the 200 m at the 2017 Dutch Indoor Athletics Championships in Apeldoorn.

== Senior career ==
=== 2018–2022 ===
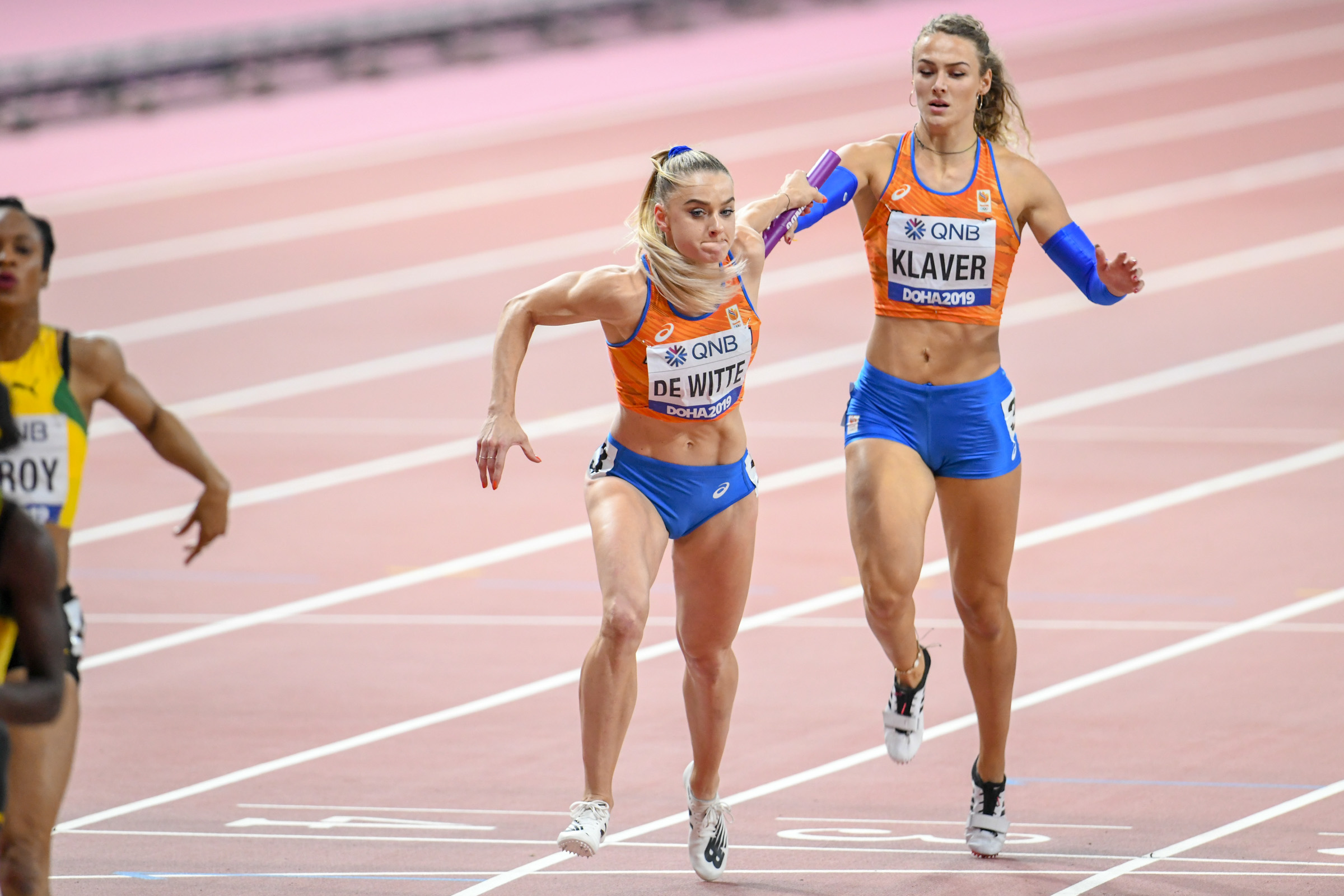
Klaver (right) passes the baton to Lisanne de Witte in the 4 × 400 m relay final at the 2019 World Athletics Championships in Doha, where the team finished in 6th place.

Since 2018, Klaver has also competed in the 400 metres, gradually shifting her focus to that distance, but without losing sight of the shorter event. In 2019, she won two medals for the 400 m at the Dutch Championships (indoors and outdoors). It earned her a place on the national 4 × 400 m relay team, which finished seventh at the Doha World Championships in Qatar that year.

In 2020, she claimed her first Dutch 400 m title (indoors), staying ahead of training buddy and rival Femke Bol. During this pandemic season, Klaver won also her first Diamond League race, a victory in the 400 m at the Golden Gala in Rome, Italy with a time of 50.98 s, becoming just the second Dutch woman to break the 51-second barrier.

Klaver represented Netherlands at the 2020 Summer Olympics in Tokyo, competing in the women's 400 m and both the women's and mixed 4 × 400 m relays. In the mixed 4 × 400 m relay, she competed in both the heats and final, in which the Dutch team finished fourth. In the women's 400 m, she was eliminated in the semi-finals. In the women's 4 × 400 m relay, she competed in the heats and final, helping the Dutch team finish in sixth place.

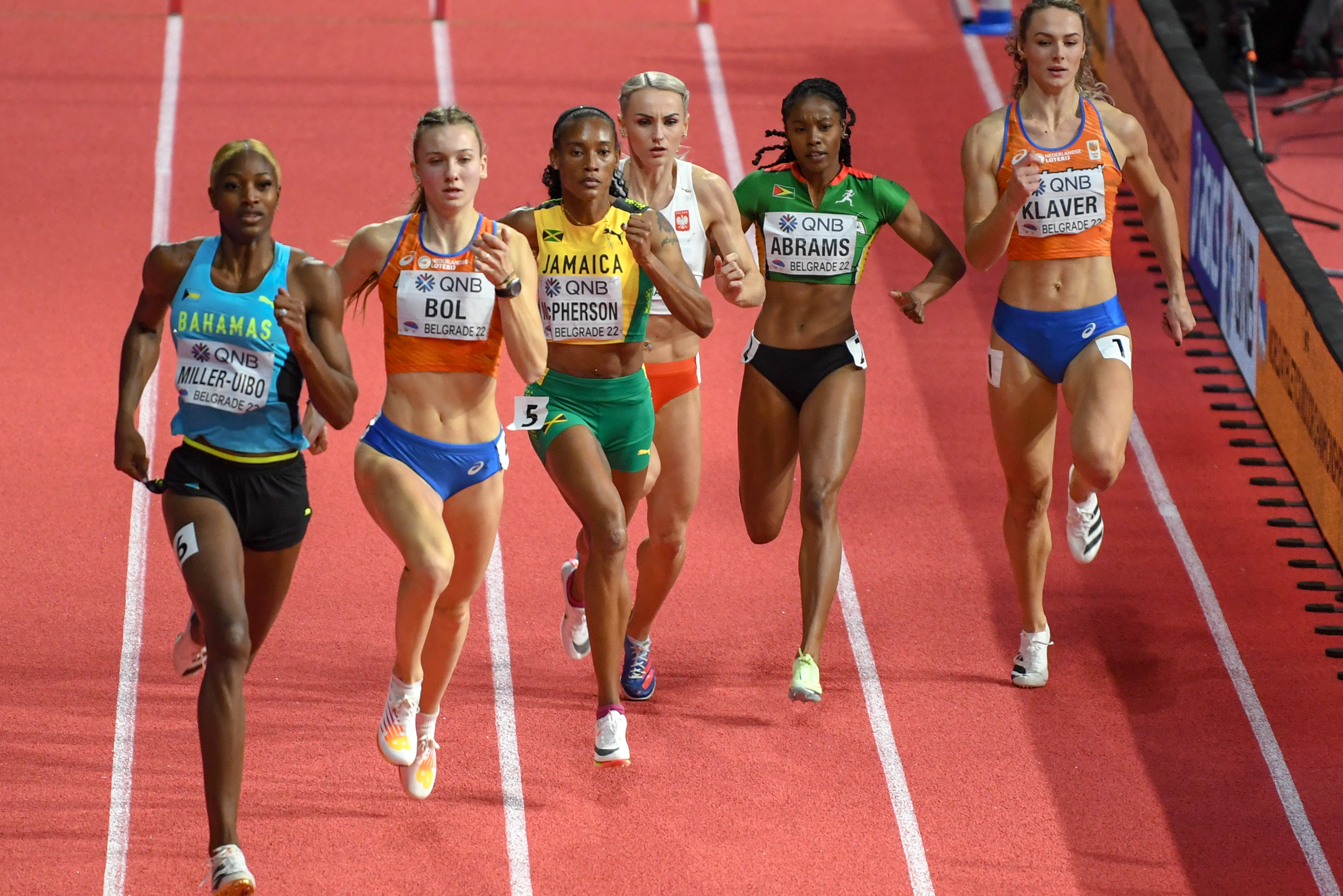
Klaver (right) in the 400 m final at the 2022 World Indoor Championships in Belgrade, where she finished in 6th place.

In February 2022, at the Dutch Indoor Championships, she set a new personal best for the indoor 400 m with a time of 51.20 s. The following month, at the World Indoor Championships, she finished sixth in the women's 400 m. In the women's 4 × 400 m relay, she ran the first leg in the heats and final, helping the Netherlands win the silver medal. During the summer season, Klaver lowered her outdoor pre-2022 best of 50.98 s to 50.18 s in the semi-finals at the World Championships in Eugene, Oregon, where she finished fourth in the final. She also competed in the mixed and women's 4 × 400 m relays. In the mixed relay, she ran the second leg in the heats and final, helping the Netherlands win the silver medal. In the women's relay, her team was disqualified in the heats.

=== 2023 ===
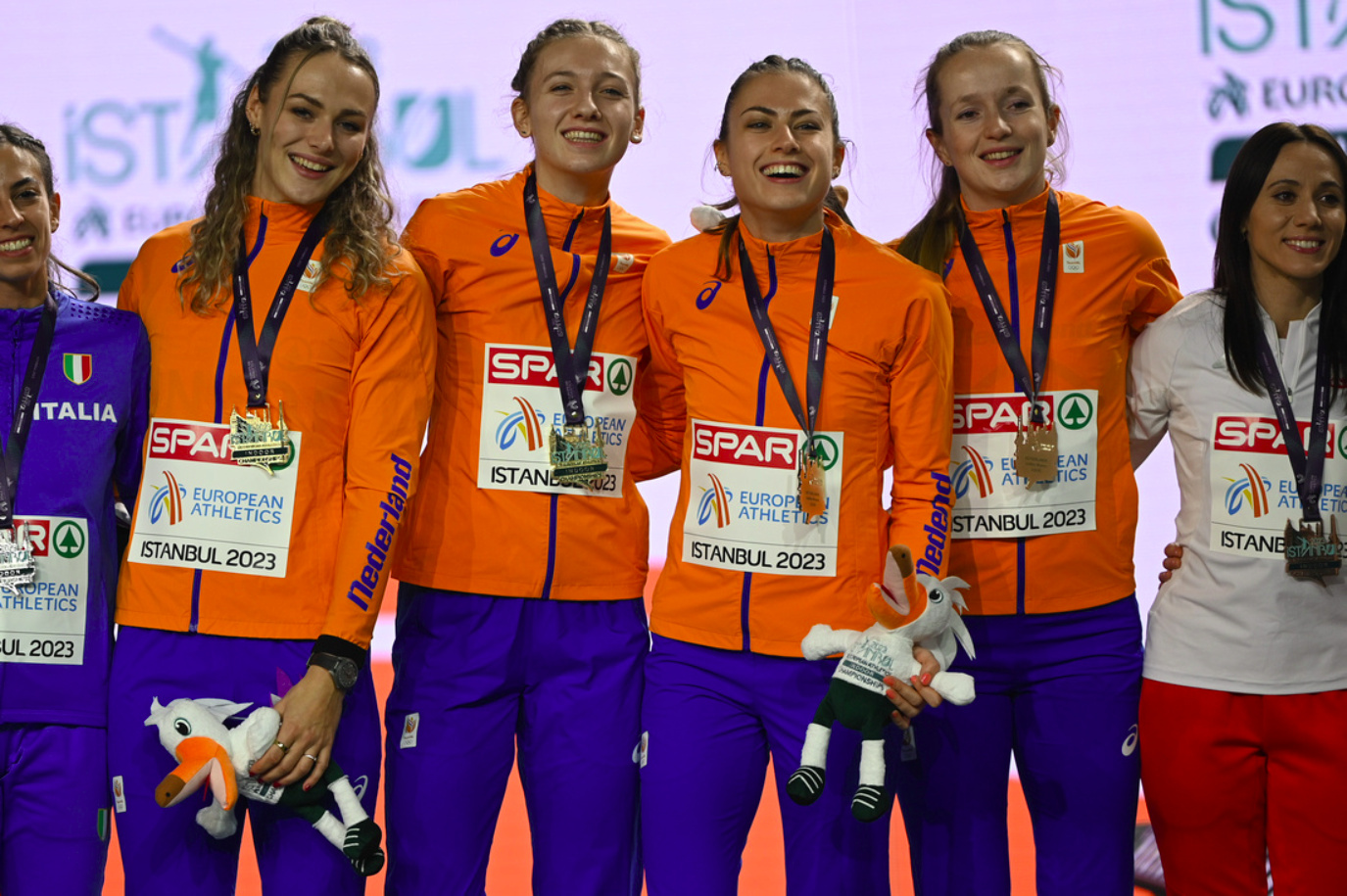
The Dutch women's team with Klaver (left), Femke Bol, Eveline Saalberg, and Cathelijn Peeters won a gold medal in the 4 × 400 m relay at the 2023 European Indoor Championships in Istanbul.

In February 2023, in the 400 m race at the Dutch Indoor Championships in which Femke Bol set a world record of 49.26 s, Klaver lowered her lifetime indoor best by nearly 0.7 s, down to 50.34 s, putting her joint 13th on the world all-time list. Only two-time Olympic champion, Shaunae Miller-Uibo of the Bahamas, and Bol had run faster indoors since 2007. The following month, Klaver won her first individual major medal, a silver for the 400 m at the European Indoor Championships held in Istanbul.

Klaver's success carried over into the outdoor season. Throughout the season, she lowered her personal bests over 100 m, 200 m, and 400 m. Her biggest performance of the year came on 16 July at the Silesian Diamond League, where she lowered her 400 m personal best to 49.81 s, breaking the 50-second barrier for the first time in her career.

Later that year, Klaver had a busy schedule at the World Championship in Budapest. Aside from running the individual 400 metres event, she was also part of the Dutch relay squads in the mixed 4 × 400 metres, women's 4 × 400 metres, and women's 4 × 100 metres. On 19 August, during the 4 × 400 mixed relay final, Klaver's teammate Femke Bol fell within metres of the finish line, while vying with Alexis Holmes of the US for first place. Landing face first, Bol lost the relay baton over the finish line, making it impossible for the Netherlands team to legitimately finish the race and resulting in a DNF.

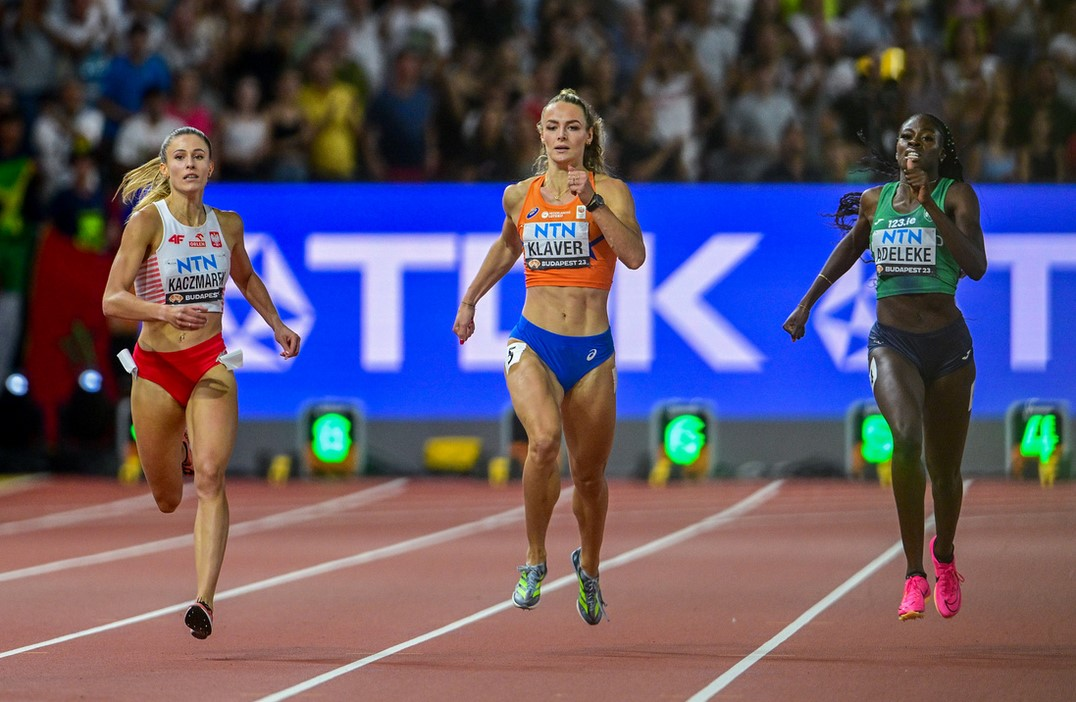
Klaver (center) with Natalia Kaczmarek and Rhasidat Adeleke in the 400 m final at the 2023 World Championships in Budapest, where she finished in 6th place.

After the disappointment, Klaver continued her championships in the individual 400 metres. After winning her semi-final in 49.87 s, she looked to be a potential medal contender. In the final however, she changed her race plan, starting much faster over the first 200 metres than usual. In the final 100 metres, she fell back to the middle of the field, resulting in a sixth-place finish.

Later that week, Klaver was brought in for the women's 4 × 100 metres final. The Dutch team lost the baton on the last handover, resulting in another DNF.

Klaver ended her championships in the women's 4 × 400 metres final. During her second leg, she brought the Dutch team back from the middle of the pack to the top three, along with Great Britain and Jamaica. On the fourth leg, Klaver's teammate Bol anchored the Dutch team to the world title, passing the Brits and Jamaicans in the last metres. Individually, Klaver ran a split time of 48.78 seconds, which was the second fastest split of the race after Bol's 48.75 seconds.

On 17 September, Klaver was third in the 2023 Diamond League final of the 400 metres with a time of 50.47 seconds, after champion Marileidy Paulino and Natalia Kaczmarek.

=== 2024 ===
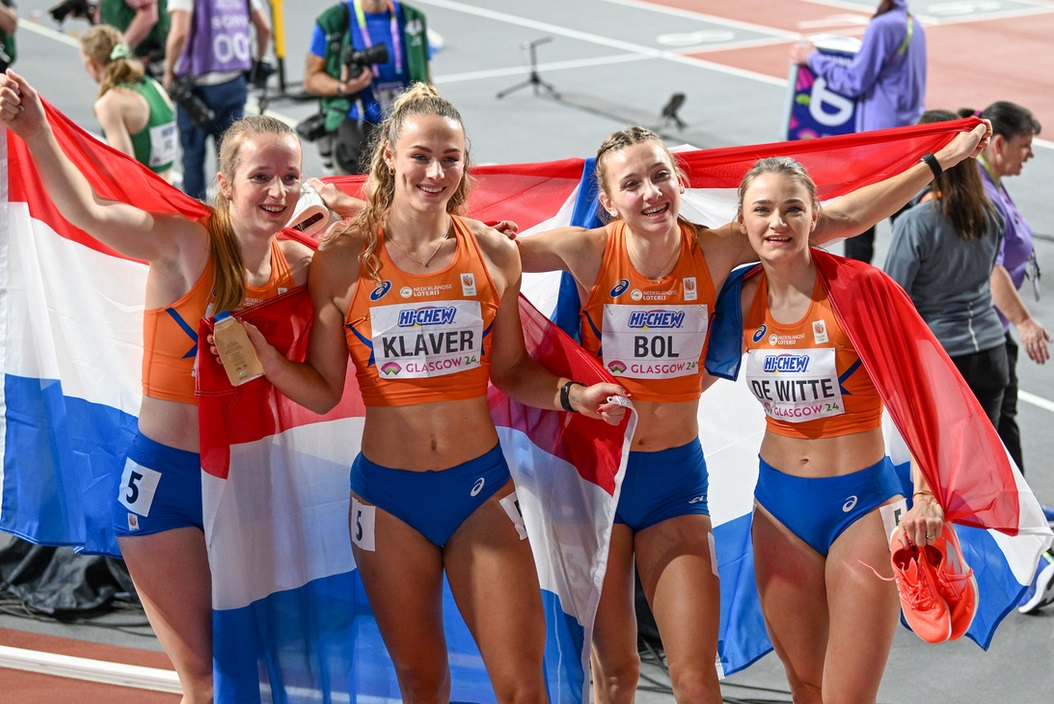
The Dutch women's relay team with Cathelijn Peeters, Klaver, Femke Bol, and Lisanne de Witte after winning the 4 × 400 m relay final at the 2024 World Athletics Indoor Championships in Glasgow

Klaver won the 400 m short track races at the 2024 Czech Indoor Gala in Ostrava, Czech Republic, in 50.54 s and at the 2024 Copernicus Cup in Torún, Poland, in 50.57 s, and she finished second at the 2024 Meeting Hauts-de-France Pas-de-Calais in Liévin, France in 50.50 s. This made her the overall winner in the 400 m of the 2024 World Athletics Indoor Tour.

Klaver won a silver medal at the 2024 Dutch Indoor Championships in 50.10 s, where Femke Bol won gold.

Klaver won a silver medal in the 400 metres short track at the 2024 World Indoor Championships in Glasgow, finishing in 50.16 s, almost a second after Femke Bol. She continued to win a gold medal in the 4 × 400 metres short track relay with the Dutch women's team in a new Dutch record time of 3:25.07 min.

At the 2024 Summer Olympics, she won a gold medal in the mixed 4 × 400 m relay and a silver medal in the women's 4 × 400 m relay.

=== 2025 ===
At the Czech Indoor Gala in Ostrava, Klaver won the 400 m short track in 50.92 s. In March, Klaver won her first individual major gold medal, in the 400 m at the European Indoor Championships held in Apeldoorn.

=== 2026 ===
At the 2026 European Championships in Birmingham, England, Klaver won the bronze medal in the 400 metres. She was also a member of the Netherlands teams which won gold in the women's 4 × 400 metres relay and bronze in the mixed 4 × 400 metres relay.

== Personal bests ==
Information from her World Athletics profile unless otherwise noted.

=== Individual events ===
Personal best times for individual events
Event	Time	Location	Date	Notes
60 metres	7.41 i	Apeldoorn, Netherlands	1 February 2020	
100 metres	11.33	Breda, Netherlands	28 July 2023	(Wind: −0.2 m/s)
100 metres	11.33	Willemstad, Curaçao	28 April 2024	(Wind: −0.1 m/s)
150 metres	16.89	Ostrava, Czech Republic	8 September 2020	(Wind: +0.6 m/s)
200 metres	22.46	Chorzów, Poland	25 June 2023	(Wind: +1.2 m/s)
200 metres short track	22.81 i	Metz, France	3 February 2024	
300 metres	36.49	Brussels, Belgium	25 May 2025	
400 metres	49.58	London, United Kingdom	20 July 2024	
400 metres	49.58	Monaco	10 July 2026	
400 metres short track	50.10 i	Apeldoorn, Netherlands	18 February 2024	

==== Season's bests ====
Season's best times for individual events
Year	60 m	100 m	200 m	200 m sh	400 m	400 m sh
2012	8.11 i	—N/a	—N/a	—N/a	—N/a	—N/a
2013	7.97 i	12.65	—N/a	—N/a	—N/a	—N/a
2014	7.84 i	12.08	24.40	—N/a	—N/a	—N/a
2015	—N/a	11.89	24.03	—N/a	—N/a	—N/a
2016	7.59 i	11.98	24.00	24.59 i	—N/a	—N/a
2017	7.48 i	11.74	23.84	23.82 i	—N/a	—N/a
2018	7.67 i	11.49	23.62	—N/a	54.41	—N/a
2019	—N/a	11.46	23.35	—N/a	53.18	53.47 i
2020	**7.41** i	11.54	22.66	—N/a	50.98	52.45 i
2021	—N/a	11.46	22.83	23.10 i	50.98	51.21 i
2022	—N/a	11.46	22.71	23.27 i	50.18	51.20 i
2023	—N/a	**11.33**	**22.46**	22.97 i	49.81	50.34 i
2024	—N/a	**11.33**	22.72	**22.81** i	**49.58**	**50.10** i
2025	—N/a	—N/a	22.59	23.10 i	50.11	50.38 i
2026	—N/a	—N/a	22.99	—N/a	**49.58**	51.00 i

Key: Lifetime best (in bold)

=== Team events ===
Personal best times for team events
Type	Event	Time	Venue	Date	Record	Notes
Women	4 × 100 m relay	42.02	Madrid, Spain	28 June 2025	NR	Teamed with Nadine Visser, Minke Bisschops, and Marije van Hunenstijn. Klaver ran the second leg.
Women	4 × 400 m relay	3:19.50	Paris, France	10 August 2024	NR	Teamed with Cathelijn Peeters, Lisanne de Witte and Femke Bol. Klaver's split time for the first leg was 50.25 s.
Women	4 × 400 m relay short track	3:24.34 i	Apeldoorn, Netherlands	9 March 2025	NR	Teamed with Nina Franke, Cathelijn Peeters, and Femke Bol. Klaver ran the first leg.
Mixed	4 × 400 m relay	3:07.43	Paris, France	3 August 2024	AR	Second-fastest national team of all time. Teamed with Eugene Omalla, Isaya Klein Ikkink and Femke Bol. Klaver's split time for the second leg was 49.26 s.

== Competition results ==
Information from her World Athletics profile unless otherwise noted.

=== World Athletics Rankings ===
Klaver has had rankings for three events and an overall ranking in the World Athletics Rankings.

Highest world rankings per year
Year	Event			Overall
Year	100 m	200 m	400 m	Overall
2019	267	89	140	1299
2020	—N/a	94	80	838
2021	—N/a	34	11	205
2022	—N/a	21	5	108
2023	—N/a	14	4	66
2024	**184**	**13**	**3**	**55**
2025	—N/a	—N/a	6	79

Key: Lifetime best (in bold)

=== International championships ===
Results of international championships representing the Netherlands
Year	Competition	Location	Result	Event	Time	Notes
2014	World Junior Championships	Eugene, OR, United States	8th (h)	4 × 100 m relay	45.29	
2015	European Junior Championships	Eskilstuna, Sweden	6th	200 m	23.69	
2015	European Junior Championships	Eskilstuna, Sweden	– (f)	4 × 100 m relay	DNF	
2016	World Junior Championships	Bydgoszcz, Poland	– (h)	4 × 100 m relay	DNF	
2017	European Junior Championships	Grosseto, Italy	6th	200 m	24.06	
2017	European Junior Championships	Grosseto, Italy	8th	4 × 100 m relay	45.61	
2019	World Relays	Yokohama, Japan	7th	4 × 400 m relay	3:29.03	(1st in Final B)
2019	European Team Championships, 1st League	Sandnes, Norway	3rd	4 × 400 m relay	3:33.97	
2019	World Championships	Doha, Qatar	7th	4 × 400 m relay	3:27.89	(Note: Dutch team ran 3:27.40 in the heats)
2021	European Indoor Championships	Toruń, Poland	5th	400 m sh	52.03 i	
2021	European Indoor Championships	Toruń, Poland	1st	4 × 400 m relay sh	3:27.15 i	EL CR NR
2021	World Relays	Chorzów, Poland	4th	4 × 400 m relay	3:30.12	(Note: Dutch team without Klaver ran 3:28.40 in the heats)
2021	World Relays	Chorzów, Poland	8th	4 × 400 m mixed	3:18.04	NR (Note: Time from the heats; Klaver was replaced in the final in which Dutch team clocked 3:21.02)
2021	European Team Championships, 1st League	Cluj-Napoca, Romania	2nd	200 m	23.32	
2021	European Team Championships, 1st League	Cluj-Napoca, Romania	1st	4 × 100 m relay	43.38	
2021	Olympic Games	Tokyo, Japan	18th (sf)	400 m	51.37	
2021	Olympic Games	Tokyo, Japan	6th	4 × 400 m relay	3:23.74	NR
2021	Olympic Games	Tokyo, Japan	4th	4 × 400 m mixed	3:10.36	NR
2022	World Indoor Championships	Belgrade, Serbia	6th	400 m sh	52.67 i	
2022	World Indoor Championships	Belgrade, Serbia	2nd	4 × 400 m relay sh	3:28.57 i	SB
2022	World Championships	Eugene, OR, United States	4th	400 m	50.33	(NR h & sf)
2022	World Championships	Eugene, OR, United States	– (h)	4 × 400 m relay	DQ	
2022	World Championships	Eugene, OR, United States	2nd	4 × 400 m mixed	3:09.90	NR
2022	European Championships	Munich, Germany	5th	200 m	22.88	
2022	European Championships	Munich, Germany	6th	400 m	50.56	
2022	European Championships	Munich, Germany	1st	4 × 400 m relay	3:20.87	AL NR (49.2 split)
2023	European Indoor Championships	Istanbul, Turkey	2nd	400 m sh	50.57 i	
2023	European Indoor Championships	Istanbul, Turkey	1st	4 × 400 m relay sh	3:25.66 i	CR NR
2023	European Games / European Team Championships First Division	Chorzów, Poland	1st	200 metres	22.46	
2023	European Games / European Team Championships First Division	Chorzów, Poland	1st	4 × 100 metres relay	42.61	
2023	World Championships	Budapest, Hungary	– (f)	4 × 400 m mixed	DNF	
2023	World Championships	Budapest, Hungary	6th	400 m	50.33	
2023	World Championships	Budapest, Hungary	– (f)	4 × 100 m relay	DNF	
2023	World Championships	Budapest, Hungary	1st	4 × 400 m relay	3:20.72	WL NR
2024	World Indoor Championships	Glasgow, United Kingdom	2nd	400 m sh	50.16 i	
2024	World Indoor Championships	Glasgow, United Kingdom	1st	4 × 400 m relay sh	3:25.07 i	NR
2024	World Relays	Nassau, Bahamas	2nd	4 × 400 m mixed	3:11.45	
2024	European Championships	Rome, Italy	3rd	4 × 400 m mixed	3:10.73	(50.74 split)
2024	European Championships	Rome, Italy	3rd	400 m	50.08	
2024	European Championships	Rome, Italy	1st	4 × 400 m relay	3:22.39	(50.57 split)
2024	Olympic Games	Paris, France	1st	4 × 400 m mixed	3:07.43	AR
2024	Olympic Games	Paris, France	10th (sf)	400 m	50.44	(Note: Klaver ran 49.96 in round 1.)
2024	Olympic Games	Paris, France	2nd	4 × 400 m relay	3:19.50	NR
2025	European Indoor Championships	Apeldoorn, Netherlands	1st	400 m	50.38 i	
2025	European Indoor Championships	Apeldoorn, Netherlands	1st	4 × 400 m relay	3:24.34 i	CR
2025	World Championships	Tokyo, Japan	2nd	4 × 400 m mixed	3:09.96	
2025	World Championships	Tokyo, Japan	11th (sf)	400 m	50.25	
2025	World Championships	Tokyo, Japan	3rd	4 × 400 m relay	3:20.18	
2026	World Indoor Championships	Toruń, Poland	3rd	400 m sh	51.02 i	
2026	World Indoor Championships	Toruń, Poland	2nd	4 × 400 m relay sh	3:26.00 i	
2026	European Championships	Birmingham, United Kingdom	3rd	4 × 400 m mixed	3:10.77	(49.6 split)
2026	European Championships	Birmingham, United Kingdom	3rd	400 m	50.15	
2026	European Championships	Birmingham, United Kingdom	1st	4 × 400 m relay	3:21.10	(49.5 split)
2026	World Athletics Ultimate Championship	Budapest, Hungary	4th	400 m	49.91	
2026	World Athletics Ultimate Championship	Budapest, Hungary	3rd (Note: At this championship, the top three teams don't receive medals, only the winner receives a trophy.)	4 × 400 m mixed	3:09.57	(49.37 split)

=== Circuit wins and titles ===
- Diamond League

400 metres wins, times (in seconds) specified in parentheses

- 2020 (1): Rome Golden Gala (50.98 PB)

- World Athletics Continental Tour

400 metres wins, times (in seconds) specified in parentheses

- 2022 (1): Bern CITIUS Meeting (51.21)
- 2023 (1): La Chaux-de-Fonds Resisprint International (50.40)

- World Athletics Indoor Tour

400 metres short track overall winner (2): 2024 (27 points), 2026
400 metres short track wins, times (in seconds) specified in parentheses

- 2023 (2): Ostrava Czech Indoor Gala (51.00 i), Torún Copernicus Cup (51.14 i)
- 2024 (2): Ostrava (50.54 i), Torún (50.57 i)
- 2025 (3): Ostrava (50.92 i), Metz Meeting Moselle Athlélor (51.70 i), Liévin Meeting Hauts-de-France Pas-de-Calais (50.76 i)
- 2026 (2): Ostrava (51.00 i), Madrid Villa de Madrid Indoor Meeting (51.26 i)

=== National championships ===
Results in the national championships representing SAV
Year	Competition	Location	Result	Event	Time
2013	Dutch U18 Indoor Championships	Apeldoorn	8th	60 m	8.11 i
2014	Dutch U18 Indoor Championships	Apeldoorn	3rd	60 m	7.85 i
2014	Dutch U18 Championships	Amsterdam	3rd	100 m	12.38
2014	Dutch U18 Championships	Amsterdam	3rd	200 m	24.77
2015	Dutch U20 Championships	Breda	5th	100 m	12.13
2015	Dutch U20 Championships	Breda	2nd	200 m	24.03
2016	Dutch Indoor Championships	Apeldoorn	5th (sf)	60 m	7.60 i
2016	Dutch U20 Championships	Breda	3rd	100 m	12.15
2016	Dutch U20 Championships	Breda	1st	200 m	24.15
2017	Dutch Indoor Championships	Apeldoorn	4th	60 m	7.48 i
2017	Dutch Indoor Championships	Apeldoorn	1st	200 m sh	23.82 i
2017	Dutch U20/U18 Championships, U20 Events	Vught	1st	100 m	11.74
2017	Dutch U20/U18 Championships, U20 Events	Vught	1st	200 m	23.90
2018	Dutch Championships	Utrecht	7th	400 m	54.55
2019	Dutch Indoor Championship	Apeldoorn	2nd	400 m sh	53.47 i
2019	Dutch Championships	The Hague	3rd	400 m	53.18
2020	Dutch Indoor Championships	Apeldoorn	1st	400 m sh	52.45 i
2020	Dutch Championships	Utrecht	1st	200 m	22.95
2021	Dutch Indoor Championships	Apeldoorn	2nd	400 m sh	51.21 i
2021	Dutch Championships	Breda	2nd	200 m	23.04
2022	Dutch Indoor Championships	Apeldoorn	2nd	400 m sh	51.20 i
2022	Dutch Championships	Apeldoorn	1st	200 m	22.74
2023	Dutch Indoor Championships	Apeldoorn	2nd	400 m sh	50.34 i
2023	Dutch Championships	Breda	3rd	100 m	11.36
2024	Dutch Indoor Championships	Apeldoorn	2nd	400 m sh	50.10 i
2024	Dutch Championships	Hengelo	4th	100 m	11.49
2024	Dutch Championships	Hengelo	2nd	200 m	22.72
2025	Dutch Indoor Championships	Apeldoorn	1st	400 m sh	51.11 i
2025	Dutch Championships	Hengelo	1st	200 m	22.82
2026	Dutch Indoor Championships	Apeldoorn	1st	400 m sh	51.28 i
2026	Dutch Championships	Hengelo	1st	200 m	23.13

== Recognition ==
- 2022: Dutch Sports Team of the Year of the NOC*NSF: women's 4 × 400 metres relay team (shared with Femke Bol, Andrea Bouma, Eveline Saalberg, Laura de Witte, and Lisanne de Witte)
- 2023: Dutch Sports Team of the Year of the NOC*NSF: women's 4 × 400 metres relay team (shared with Femke Bol, Cathelijn Peeters, Eveline Saalberg, and Lisanne de Witte)
