= Susanne Gogl-Walli =

Austrian sprinter (born 1996)

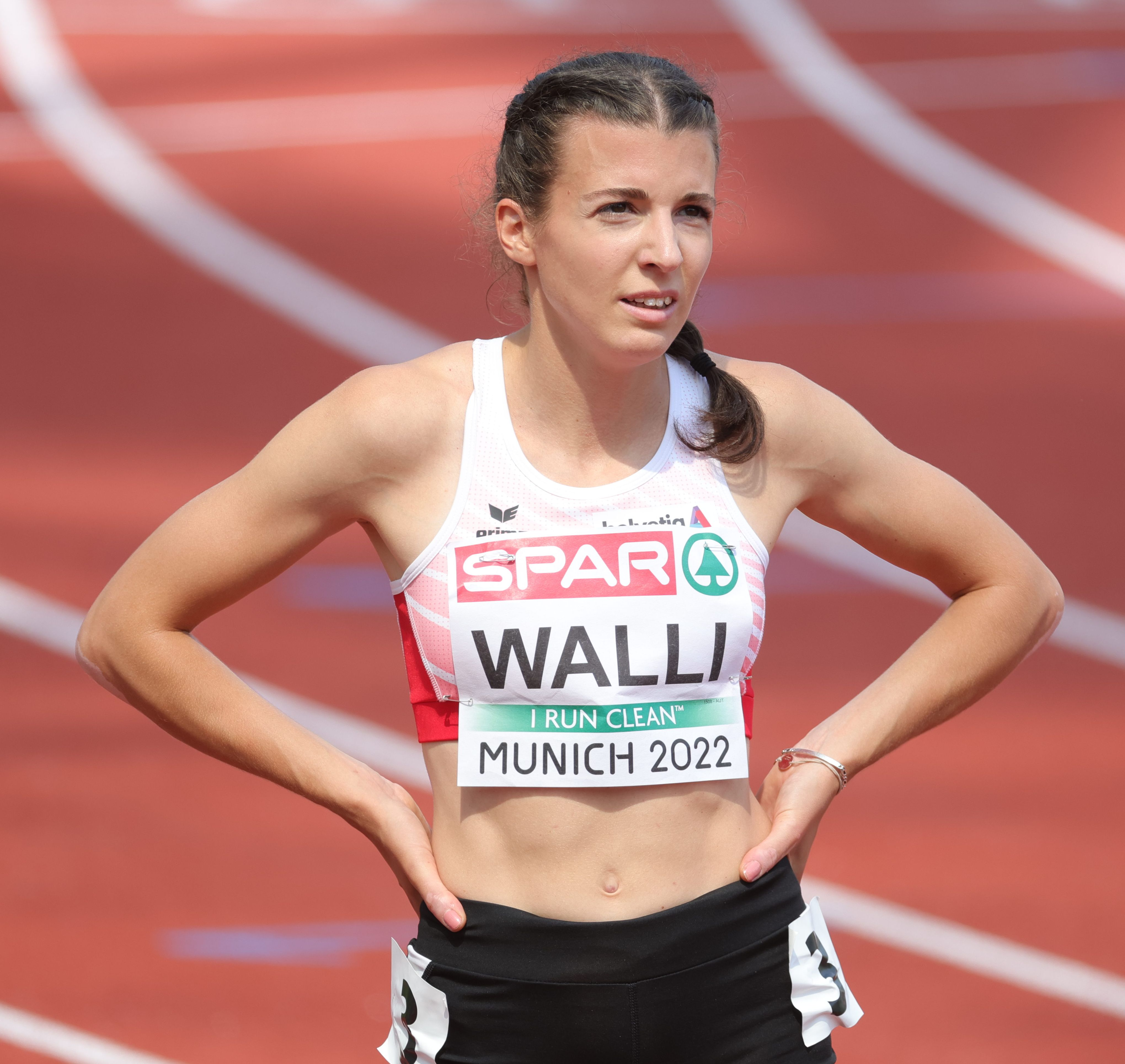
- Walli at the European Championships in 2022

Personal information
- Nationality: Austrian
- Born: Susanne Walli; 5 May 1996 (age 30)

Sport
- Sport: Athletics
- Event: 400 metres

Susanne Gogl-Walli (born 5 May 1996) is an Austrian sprinter specialising in the 400 metres. She competed in the women's 400 metres event at the 2020 Summer Olympics, advancing to the semi-final heat.

== Achievements ==
Year	Competition	Venue	Position	Event	Notes
Representing Austria
2013	World Youth Championships	Donetsk, Ukraine	5th (sf)	400 m	55.33
2014	World Junior Championships	Eugene, United States	8th	400 m	54.61
2015	European Junior Championships	Eskilstuna, Sweden	3rd (h)	400 m	54.49
2015	European Junior Championships	Eskilstuna, Sweden	6th	4 × 100 m relay	46.01
2017	European U23 Championships	Bydgoszcz, Poland	6th (h)	200 m	24.21
2017	European U23 Championships	Bydgoszcz, Poland	6th (h)	400 m	53.94
2019	European Indoor Championships	Glasgow, United Kingdom	5th (h)	400 m	54.69
2021	European Indoor Championships	Toruń, Poland	4th (h)	400 m	53.41
2021	Olympic Games	Tokyo, Japan	20th (sf)	400 m	51.52
2022	World Championships	Eugene, United States	23rd (sf)	400 m	52.37
2022	European Championships	Munich, Germany	21st (sf)	200 m	23.73
2022	European Championships	Munich, Germany	20th (sf)	400 m	51.73
2022	European Championships	Munich, Germany	–	4 × 100 m relay	DQ
2023	European Indoor Championships	Istanbul, Turkey	4th	400 m	51.73
2023	World Championships	Budapest, Hungary	33rd (h)	200 m	23.38
2023	World Championships	Budapest, Hungary	18th (sf)	400 m	51.00
2024	World Indoor Championships	Glasgow, United Kingdom	6th	400 m	51.37
2024	European Championships	Rome, Italy	7th	400 m	51.23
2024	Olympic Games	Paris, France	19th (sf)	400 m	51.17
2025	World Championships	Tokyo, Japan	45th (h)	400 m	52.92
2026	European Championships	Birmingham, United Kingdom	23rd (sf)	400 m	52.29
