= Sharlene Mawdsley =

Irish sprinter (born 1998)

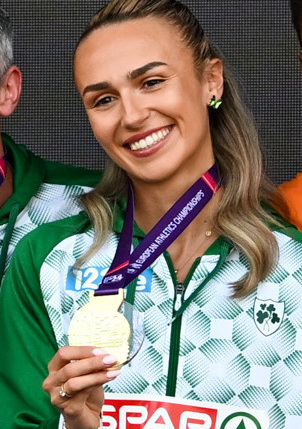
- Sharlene Mawdsley in 2024

Personal information
- Nationality: Irish
- Born: 10 August 1998 (age 28)

Sport
- Sport: Athletics
- Event: 400 metres

Achievements and titles
- Personal best: 400 m: 50.06 (Paris)
Medal record
Women's athletics
Representing Ireland
World Athletics Relays
Bronze medal – third place	2024 Nassau	4 × 400 m mixed
European Championships
Gold medal – first place	2024 Rome	4 × 400 m mixed
Silver medal – second place	2024 Rome	4 × 400 m relay

Sharlene Mawdsley (born 10 August 1998) is an Irish athlete who specialises in the 400 metres and other sprint events.

== Early life ==
Mawdsley is from Newport, County Tipperary, where she attended St. Mary's School.

She is a graduate of sociology from the University of Limerick.

Mawdsley started competing in athletics as a child. Early in her career, she competed primarily in the 200 m and also in the 100 m. She started focusing on the 400 m in 2019.

== Career ==
=== 2021 ===
Mawdsley competed in the 400 m at the 2021 European Indoor Championships in March and did not advance past the heats.

In May, at the 2021 World Relays, she helped the Irish team finish seventh in the mixed 4 × 400 m relay.

=== 2022 ===
Mawdsley competed at the 2022 World Championships in July, helping the Irish team finish eighth in the mixed 4 × 400 m relay.

In August, she competed at the 2022 European Championships. She did not advance past the heats in the 400 m. In the 4 × 400 m relay, she helped Ireland finish sixth.

=== 2023 ===
Mawdsley competed at the 2023 European Indoor Championships in March. In the 400 m, she advanced to the semifinals. She helped the Irish team finish fifth in the 4 × 400 m relay.

In August, she competed in the 2023 World Championships 400 m semifinals and finals of both the women's and mixed 4 × 400 m relays, running six races in total over nine days. She helped Ireland finish eighth in the mixed 4 × 400 relay and sixth in the 4 × 400 m relay.

=== 2024 ===
Mawdsley competed at the 2024 World Indoor Championships in March. In the 400 m, she initially advanced to the final on merit before being disqualified for obstruction in the semifinals. She then helped the Irish team finish fifth in the 4 × 400 m relay.

In May, at the 2024 World Relays, Mawdsley helped Ireland win the bronze medal in the mixed 4 × 400 m relay. It was her first major international medal.

Mawdsley competed at the 2024 European Championships in June. She helped the Irish team win the gold medal in the mixed 4 × 400 m relay. Running the final leg, she received the baton from teammate Thomas Barr in second place. Mawdsley then passed the leading Belgian Helena Ponette in the home stretch, crossing the line first in an Irish record time of 3:09.92 with the second-fastest female split of the night at 49.40. Mawdsley finished eighth in the 400 m. In the 4 × 400 m relay, she helped Ireland win the silver medal.

On the 9 September 2024, Mawdsley ended her season with a victory in the 400 m at the Gala dei Castelli meeting in Bellinzona, Switzerland. Clocking a time of 51.35, she finished ahead of Susanne Gogl-Walli with 51.39 and Lieke Klaver with 51.42.

=== 2025 ===
Competing at the 2025 World Athletics Championships in Tokyo, Japan, she ran on the opening day in the mixed 4 × 400 metres relay. She also reached the semi-finals of the women's 400 metres.

=== 2026 ===
Mawdsley won over 400 metres at the 2026 Irish Indoor Championships. In May 2026, she competed with the Irish teams at the 2026 World Athletics Relays in Gaborone, Botswana. In June, she lowered her personal best for the 400 metres at the FBK Games in Hengelo, before lowering it again to 50.06 seconds in the 2026 Diamond League event, the 2026 Meeting de Paris on 28 June.

== Achievements ==
=== International competitions ===
Representing Ireland
Year	Competition	Venue	Position	Event	Time
2015	European Junior Championships	Eskilstuna, Sweden	8th	200 m	24.09
2015	European Junior Championships	Eskilstuna, Sweden	4th	4 × 100 m relay	45.38
2016	World U20 Championships	Bydgoszcz, Poland	– (h)	200 m	DQ
2016	World U20 Championships	Bydgoszcz, Poland	5th	4 × 100 m relay	44.82
2017	European U20 Championships	Grosseto, Italy	4th (sf)	200 m	23.98
2017	European U20 Championships	Grosseto, Italy	4th	4 × 100 m relay	44.47
2019	European U23 Championships	Gävle, Sweden	7th	400 m	53.57
2019	European U23 Championships	Gävle, Sweden	4th	4 × 100 m relay	44.32
2021	European Indoor Championships	Toruń, Poland	5th (h)	400 m	53.68
2021	World Relays	Chorzów, Poland	7th	Mixed 4 × 400 m relay	3:20.26
2022	World Indoor Championships	Belgrade, Serbia	3rd (h)	4 × 400 m relay	3:30.97 NR
2022	World Championships	Eugene, United States	8th	Mixed 4 × 400 m relay	3:16.86
2022	European Championships	Munich, Germany	15th (h)	400 m	52.63
2022	European Championships	Munich, Germany	6th	4 × 400 m relay	3:26.63
2023	European Indoor Championships	Istanbul, Turkey	6th (sf)	400 m	53.37
2023	European Indoor Championships	Istanbul, Turkey	5th	4 × 400 m relay	3:32.61
2023	World Championships	Budapest, Hungary	6th	Mixed 4 × 400 m relay	3:14.13
2023	World Championships	Budapest, Hungary	22nd (sf)	400 m	51.17
2023	World Championships	Budapest, Hungary	8th	4 × 400 m relay	3:27.08
2024	World Relays	Nassau, Bahamas	3rd	Mixed 4 × 400 m relay	3:11.53 NR
2024	World Relays	Nassau, Bahamas	7th	4 × 400 m relay	3:24.38
2024	European Championships	Rome, Italy	1st	Mixed 4 × 400 m relay	3:09.92 NR CR
2024	European Championships	Rome, Italy	8th	400 m	51.58
2024	European Championships	Rome, Italy	2nd	4 × 400 m relay	3:22.71 NR
2024	Olympic Games	Paris, France	10th (h)	Mixed 4 × 400 m relay	3:12.67
2024	Olympic Games	Paris, France	10th (r)	400 m	51.18
2024	Olympic Games	Paris, France	4th	4 × 400 m relay	3:19.90 NR
2025	World Championships	Tokyo, Japan	20th (sf)	400 m	51.22
2025	World Championships	Tokyo, Japan	16th (h)	4 × 400 m relay	3:29.27
2026	World Ultimate Championship	Budapest, Hungary	14th (h)	400 m	51.28

=== Circuit performances ===
Grand Slam Track results
Slam	Race group	Event	Pl.	Time	Prize money
2025 Philadelphia Slam	Long sprints	400 m	5th	51.12	US$15,000
2025 Philadelphia Slam	Long sprints	200 m	7th	23.24	US$15,000
