= Athletics at the 2020 Summer Olympics – Women's 400 metres =

Women's 400 metres at the Games of the XXXII Olympiad
- Olympic Athletics
- Venue: Japan National Stadium
- Dates: 3 August 2021 (heats); 4 August 2021 (semifinals); 6 August 2021 (final)
- Competitors: 45 from 34 nations
- Winning time: 48.36

Medalists
1st place, gold medalist(s)		Shaunae Miller-Uibo; Bahamas
2nd place, silver medalist(s)		Marileidy Paulino; Dominican Republic
3rd place, bronze medalist(s)		Allyson Felix; United States

Official Video Highlights

The women's 400 metres event at the 2020 Summer Olympics took place from 3 to 6 August 2021 at the Japan National Stadium. 45 athletes from 34 nations competed. Shaunae Miller-Uibo won the gold medal by 0.84 seconds in a personal best of 48.36 secs, a time which ranks her sixth on the world all-time list. In successfully defending her title, Miller-Uibo joined Marie-Jose Perec as the only women to win two Olympic 400 metres titles.

== Summary ==
Returning from Rio was Gold Medalist Shaunae Miller-Uibo, remembered for her diving finish to beat Allyson Felix. Felix was back as well, now age 35 and a mother, running in her fifth Olympics. Each time she sets a season best, it is a masters world record. But the list of non-participants is notable; World Champion Salwa Eid Naser suspended a little over a month before the Olympics due to three whereabouts failures; Olympic and World Championship bronze medalist Shericka Jackson, who focused her season on the shorter sprints, netting a bronze medal in the 100 metres; Namibian teenage sensations Beatrice Masilingi, number one in 2020 and Christine Mboma who ran the #7 time in history the same day Eid Naser was suspended, both were barred from running 400 or 800 due to the new Testosterone regulations. Both ran in the 200 metres, Mboma taking silver. Another teenager, NCAA Champion Athing Mu, chose to focus her efforts on the 800 metres, netting a gold medal.

It took sub-50 in the semi-finals just to get into the final. Marileidy Paulino was the fastest qualifier at 49.34, her Dominican National Record, putting her in the center of the track, lane 5 for the final. The Jamaicans Stephenie Ann McPherson and Candice McLeod in 6 and 4 respectively, were the fastest around the first turn, with Felix, blind to her competitors in lane 9, also getting out well. Roxana Gómez pulled up after 100 m. Coming off her poor performance in the 200 final, Miller-Uibo ran conservatively in the first 200 metres, still keeping in close contact with Felix well within her view from lane 7. Towards the end of the first straight, Jodie Williams moved up to join McPherson's early pace in lane 8. Through the final turn, Miller-Uibo and Paulino began to assert themselves, with Miller-Uibo advancing to a 2 metre lead coming off the turn. Behind her, Felix, Williams, McPherson and Paulino were all in a row to battle for the medals. Down the final straight, Paulino clearly pulled away, but was too far back to chase down Miller-Uibo who kept increasing her lead. Williams fell back but McPherson and Felix battled until Felix pulled ahead half way towards home.

Miller-Uibo joined Marie-José Pérec as the only women to successfully defend the Olympic 400 metres title. She improved her personal best, which was the #6 time in history and the North American Continental Record. Paulino set her second national record of the competition, moving her to #20 of all time. This season she improved her personal best by 2.68 seconds. Felix nabbed her tenth Olympic medal, breaking a tie with Merlene Ottey as the most of any woman in athletics and set her third Masters World Record of the season.

== Background ==
This was the 15th time the event was held, having appeared at every Olympics since 1964.

== Qualification ==
A National Olympic Committee (NOC) could enter up to 3 qualified athletes in the women's 400 metres event if all athletes meet the entry standard or qualify by ranking during the qualifying period. (The limit of 3 has been in place since the 1930 Olympic Congress.) The qualifying standard is 51.35 seconds. This standard was "set for the sole purpose of qualifying athletes with exceptional performances unable to qualify through the IAAF World Rankings pathway." The world rankings, based on the average of the best five results for the athlete over the qualifying period and weighted by the importance of the meet, will then be used to qualify athletes until the cap of 48 is reached.

The qualifying period was originally from 1 May 2019 to 29 June 2020. Due to the COVID-19 pandemic, the period was suspended from 6 April 2020 to 30 November 2020, with the end date extended to 29 June 2021. The world rankings period start date was also changed from 1 May 2019 to 30 June 2020; athletes who had met the qualifying standard during that time were still qualified, but those using world rankings would not be able to count performances during that time. The qualifying time standards could be obtained in various meets during the given period that have the approval of the IAAF. Both indoor and outdoor meets were eligible for qualifying. The most recent Area Championships may be counted in the ranking, even if not during the qualifying period.

NOCs can also use their universality place—each NOC can enter one female athlete regardless of time if they had no female athletes meeting the entry standard for an athletics event—in the 400 metres.

== Competition format ==
The event continued to use the three-round format introduced in 2012.

== Records ==
Prior to this competition, the existing global and area records were as follows.

World record	Marita Koch (GDR)	47.60 s	Canberra, Australia	6 October 1985
Olympic record	Marie-José Pérec (FRA)	48.25 s	Atlanta, Georgia, United States	29 July 1996
World Leading	Shaunae Miller-Uibo (BAH)	49.08 s	Eugene, Oregon, United States	24 April 2021

Area
Area	Time (s)	Athlete	Nation
Africa (records)	48.54	Christine Mboma	Namibia
Asia (records)	48.14	Salwa Eid Naser	Bahrain
Europe (records)	47.60 WR	Marita Koch	East Germany
North, Central America and Caribbean (records)	48.37	Shaunae Miller-Uibo	Bahamas
Oceania (records)	48.63	Cathy Freeman	Australia
South America (records)	49.64	Ximena Restrepo	Colombia

== Schedule ==
All times are Japan Standard Time (UTC+9)

The women's 400 metres took place over three separate days.

Date	Time	Round
Tuesday, 3 August 2021	9:00	Round 1
Wednesday, 4 August 2021	18:30	Semifinals
Friday, 6 August 2021	19:50	Final

== Results ==
=== Round 1 ===
Qualification rule: first three finishers of each heat (Q) plus the next six fastest times (q) qualify to the semifinals.

==== Heat 1 ====
Rank	Lane	Athlete	Nation	Reaction	Time	Notes
1	2	Shaunae Miller-Uibo	Bahamas	0.132	50.50	Q
2	6	Roxana Gómez	Cuba	0.182	50.76	Q, =PB
3	7	Sada Williams	Barbados	0.154	51.36	Q, SB
4	8	Aliyah Abrams	Guyana	0.160	51.44	q, SB
5	5	Kyra Constantine	Canada	0.167	51.69	q
6	3	Anita Horvat	Slovenia	0.185	52.34	
7	4	Patience Okon George	Nigeria	0.187	52.41	

==== Heat 2 ====
Rank	Lane	Athlete	Nation	Reaction	Time	Notes
1	3	Jodie Williams	Great Britain	0.170	50.99	Q
2	4	Quanera Hayes	United States	0.175	51.07	Q
3	7	Cátia Azevedo	Portugal	0.155	51.26	Q
4	5	Lisanne de Witte	Netherlands	0.172	51.68	q, SB
5	6	Bendere Oboya	Australia	0.172	52.37	
—	2	Amantle Montsho	Botswana	0.125	DNF	
—	8	Meleni Rodney	Grenada	0.196	DNF	
—	9	Aliya Boshnak	Jordan	0.238	DQ	TR 17.3.1

==== Heat 3 ====
Rank	Lane	Athlete	Nation	Reaction	Time	Notes
1	4	Allyson Felix	United States	0.168	50.84	Q
2	2	Roneisha McGregor	Jamaica	0.180	51.14 (51.138)	Q
3	6	Lada Vondrová	Czech Republic	0.182	51.14 (51.139)	Q, PB
4	3	Ama Pipi	Great Britain	0.126	51.17	q
5	7	Tiffani Marinho	Brazil	0.210	52.11	
6	8	Leni Shida	Uganda	0.201	52.48	
7	5	Samantha Dirks	Belize	0.177	54.16	SB
8	9	Tetyana Melnyk	Ukraine	0.179	54.99	

==== Heat 4 ====
Rank	Lane	Athlete	Nation	Reaction	Time	Notes
1	5	Candice McLeod	Jamaica	0.202	51.09	Q
2	6	Amandine Brossier	France	0.171	51.65	Q
3	7	Susanne Walli	Austria	0.209	52.19	Q
4	3	Corinna Schwab	Germany	0.155	52.29	
5	9	Irini Vasiliou	Greece	0.164	53.16	
6	4	Galefele Moroko	Botswana	0.202	55.89	SB
—	8	Nicole Yeargin	Great Britain	0.182	DQ	TR 17.3.1
—	2	Cynthia Bolingo	Belgium	—	DNS	

==== Heat 5 ====
Rank	Lane	Athlete	Nation	Reaction	Time	Notes
1	3	Stephenie Ann McPherson	Jamaica	0.138	50.89	Q
2	4	Natalia Kaczmarek	Poland	0.150	51.06	Q
3	5	Paola Morán	Mexico	0.162	51.18	Q, SB
4	6	Phil Healy	Ireland	0.158	51.98	
5	8	Hellen Syombua Kalii	Kenya	0.221	52.70	
6	2	Agnė Šerkšnienė	Lithuania	0.172	52.78	
7	7	Natassha McDonald	Canada	0.161	53.54	

==== Heat 6 ====
Rank	Lane	Athlete	Nation	Reaction	Time	Notes
1	2	Marileidy Paulino	Dominican Republic	0.184	50.06	Q
2	6	Wadeline Jonathas	United States	0.209	50.93	Q
3	4	Lieke Klaver	Netherlands	0.200	51.37	Q
4	7	Aauri Bokesa	Spain	0.235	51.89	q, SB
5	9	Eleni Artymata	Cyprus	0.224	51.91	q
6	8	Barbora Malíková	Czech Republic	0.195	52.83	
7	3	Shalysa Wray	Cayman Islands	0.216	53.61	
8	5	Christine Botlogetswe	Botswana	0.214	53.99	SB

=== Semifinals ===
Qualification rule: first two finishers of each heat (Q) plus the next two fastest times (q) qualify to the final.

==== Semifinal 1 ====
Rank	Lane	Athlete	Nation	Reaction	Time	Notes
1	5	Marileidy Paulino	Dominican Republic	0.172	49.38	Q, NR
2	7	Candice McLeod	Jamaica	0.162	49.51	Q, PB
3	4	Roxana Gómez	Cuba	0.168	49.71	q, PB
4	6	Quanera Hayes	United States	0.153	49.81	q
5	3	Eleni Artymata	Cyprus	0.191	50.80	NR
6	9	Susanne Walli	Austria	0.224	51.52	PB
7	2	Ama Pipi	Great Britain	0.140	51.59	
8	8	Lada Vondrová	Czech Republic	0.183	51.62	

==== Semifinal 2 ====
Rank	Lane	Athlete	Nation	Reaction	Time	Notes
1	6	Shaunae Miller-Uibo	Bahamas	0.155	49.60	Q
2	5	Jodie Williams	Great Britain	0.136	49.97	Q, PB
3	4	Roneisha McGregor	Jamaica	0.181	50.34	
4	7	Wadeline Jonathas	United States	0.189	50.51	
5	9	Paola Morán	Mexico	0.168	51.06	SB
6	8	Lieke Klaver	Netherlands	0.208	51.37	
7	2	Aliyah Abrams	Guyana	0.137	51.46	
8	3	Aauri Bokesa	Spain	0.194	51.57	PB

==== Semifinal 3 ====
Rank	Lane	Athlete	Nation	Reaction	Time	Notes
1	5	Stephenie Ann McPherson	Jamaica	0.134	49.34	Q, PB
2	6	Allyson Felix	United States	0.179	49.89	Q, SB MWR
3	8	Sada Williams	Barbados	0.167	50.11	NR
4	4	Natalia Kaczmarek	Poland	0.165	50.79	
5	3	Kyra Constantine	Canada	0.177	51.22	
6	7	Amandine Brossier	France	0.170	51.30	
7	9	Cátia Azevedo	Portugal	0.146	51.32	
8	2	Lisanne de Witte	Netherlands	0.178	52.09	

=== Final ===
Rank	Lane	Athlete	Nation	Reaction	Time	Notes
1st place, gold medalist(s)	7	Shaunae Miller-Uibo	Bahamas	0.162	48.36	AR
2nd place, silver medalist(s)	5	Marileidy Paulino	Dominican Republic	0.176	49.20	NR
3rd place, bronze medalist(s)	9	Allyson Felix	United States	0.158	49.46	SB MWR
4	6	Stephenie Ann McPherson	Jamaica	0.131	49.61	
5	4	Candice McLeod	Jamaica	0.152	49.87	
6	8	Jodie Williams	Great Britain	0.127	49.97	=PB
7	2	Quanera Hayes	United States	0.176	50.88	
	3	Roxana Gómez	Cuba	0.191		DNF
