= 2023 European Athletics Indoor Championships – Women's 400 metres =

Women's 400 metres at the 2023 European Athletics Indoor Championships
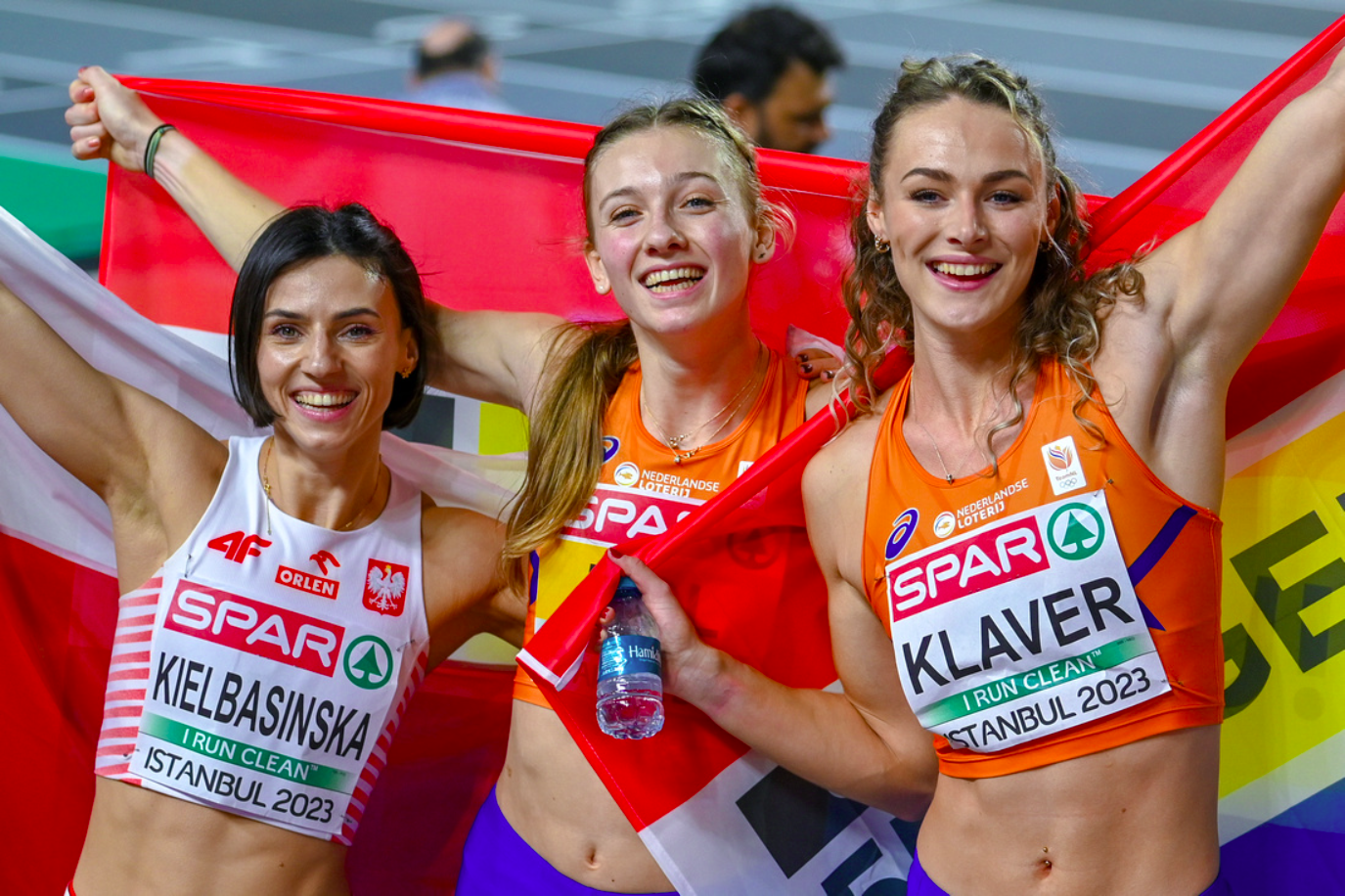
- Medalists Anna Kiełbasińska (bronze), Femke Bol (gold), and Lieke Klaver (silver) celebrate with flags after the final
- Venue: Ataköy Athletics Arena
- Location: Istanbul, Turkey
- Dates: 3 March 2023 (round 1 and semi-finals); 4 March 2023 (final)
- Competitors: 27 from 16 nations
- Winning time: 49.85 s

Medalists
gold medal	Femke Bol	Netherlands
silver medal	Lieke Klaver	Netherlands
bronze medal	Anna Kiełbasińska	Poland

The women's 400 metres at the 2023 European Athletics Indoor Championships took place in three rounds at the Ataköy Athletics Arena in Istanbul, Turkey, on 3 and 4 March 2023. This was the 37th time the women's 400 metres was contested at the European Athletics Indoor Championships. Athletes could qualify by achieving the entry standard or by their World Athletics Ranking for the event.

Twenty-seven athletes from sixteen nations competed in the first round on 3 March in the morning. In twenty-sixth place, Duna Viñals set an Andorran record of 57.71 s. Twelve athletes advanced to the semi-finals on 3 March in the evening, where Viivi Lehikoinen of Finland was disqualified for obstruction and six athletes qualified to compete in the final race on 4 March.

In the final, the gold medal was won by world record holder Femke Bol of the Netherlands in a time of 49.85 s, successfully defending her 2021 title, silver by Lieke Klaver of the Netherlands in 50.57 s, and bronze by Anna Kiełbasińska of Poland in 51.25 s. In fourth place, Susanne Gogl-Walli set an Austrian record of 51.73 s.

== Background ==
The women's 400 metres was contested at every previous edition of the European Athletics Indoor Championships (1970–2021), 36 times in total before 2023: every year from 1970 until 1990, and every other year since then until 2021, with a three-year gap between 2002 and 2005 for synchronisation with other international athletics championships.

The 2023 European Athletics Indoor Championships was held in the Ataköy Athletics Arena in the Ataköy quarter in Bakırköy, Istanbul, Turkey. This indoor track and field arena was originally built for the 2012 IAAF World Indoor Championships and has a capacity of 7,450 spectators.

On 19 February 2023, less than two weeks before the championships, Femke Bol of the Netherlands broke Jarmila Kratochvílová's 1982 world record of the 400 metres indoor in a time of 49.26 s. At the start of the 2023 championships, this was also the European record and the leading time in Europe and the world. Kratochvílová's former world record of 49.59 s was still standing as the championship record. Bol was the defending champion after winning this event in a time of 50.63 s in 2021.

Records before the 2023 European Athletics Indoor Championships
Record	Athlete (nation)	Time	Location	Date
World record	Femke Bol (NED)	49.26	Apeldoorn, Netherlands	19 February 2023
European record	Femke Bol (NED)	49.26	Apeldoorn, Netherlands	19 February 2023
World leading	Femke Bol (NED)	49.26	Apeldoorn, Netherlands	19 February 2023
European leading	Femke Bol (NED)	49.26	Apeldoorn, Netherlands	19 February 2023
Championship record	Jarmila Kratochvílová (TCH)	49.59	Milan, Italy	7 March 1982

== Qualification ==
For the women's 400 metres at these championships, the qualification period was from 20 February 2022 to 19 February 2023. Athletes could qualify by achieving the entry standard of 52.20 s for 400 metres indoor or 50.80 s for 400 metres outdoor. Athletes who did not achieve the entry standard could still qualify by their position on the World Athletics Ranking for this event. There was a target number of thirty athletes in total, with a maximum of three athletes per nation. A final entry list with twenty-seven athletes from sixteen nations was published on 23 February 2023.

== Rounds ==
=== Round 1 ===
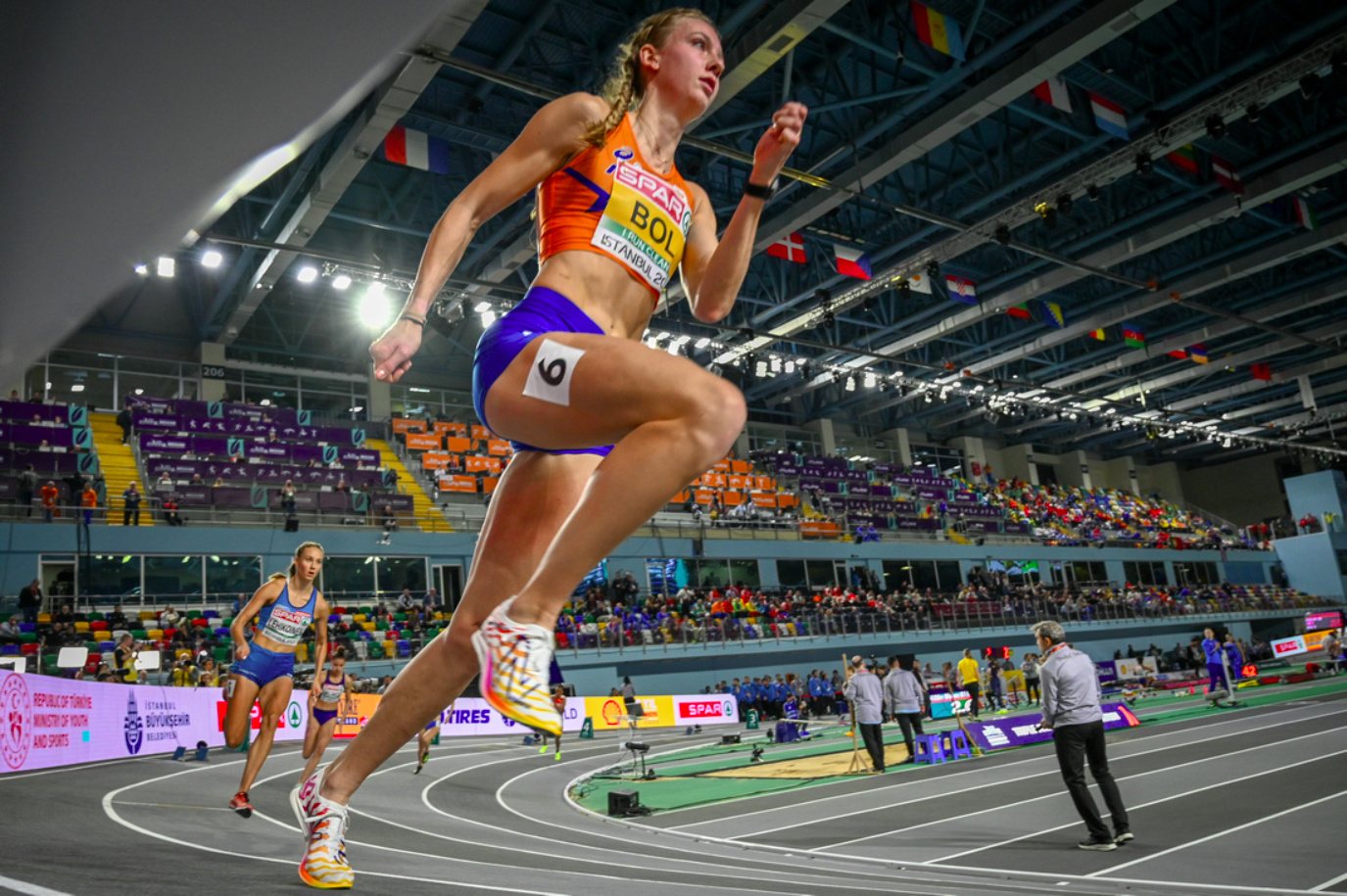
Femke Bol (center) and Viivi Lehikoinen (left) at the start of the second heat of round 1

The five heats of round 1 were held on 3 March 2023, starting at 10:40 (UTC+3) in the morning. Of the twenty-seven competing athletes from sixteen nations, the first two athletes in each heat (Q) and the next two fastest (q) advanced to the semi-finals. In the first heat, Duna Viñals of Andorra set a national record (NR) of 57.71 s. In the fifth heat, Tereza Petržilková of Czech Republic, Helena Ponette of Belgium, and Cliodhna Manning of Ireland ran personal best times (PB).

Results of round 1
Rank	Heat	Athlete	Nationality	Time	Note
1	5	Anna Kiełbasińska	Poland	51.77	Q
2	5	Tereza Petržilková	Czech Republic	52.14	Q, PB
3	5	Helena Ponette	Belgium	52.31	q, PB
4	4	Susanne Gogl-Walli	Austria	52.34	Q
5	2	Femke Bol	Netherlands	52.35	Q
6	4	Sharlene Mawdsley	Ireland	52.59	Q
7	3	Lieke Klaver	Netherlands	52.72	Q
8	1	Lada Vondrová	Czech Republic	52.77	Q
9	4	Gunta Vaičule	Latvia	52.85	q, SB
10	2	Viivi Lehikoinen	Finland	52.88	Q
11	3	Alice Mangione	Italy	52.99	Q
12	3	Camille Laus	Belgium	53.10	
13	1	Henriette Jæger	Norway	53.27	Q
14	4	Raphaela Lukudo	Italy	53.30	
15	2	Anna Polinari	Italy	53.38	
16	1	Sophie Becker	Ireland	53.43	
17	1	Julia Niederberger	Switzerland	53.52	
18	5	Lisanne de Witte	Netherlands	53.61	
19	3	Eirini Vasileiou	Greece	53.71	
20	2	Yasmin Giger	Switzerland	53.89	
21	2	Veronika Drljačić	Croatia	54.04	
22	5	Cliodhna Manning	Ireland	54.21	PB
23	4	Andrianna Ferra	Greece	55.29	SB
24	3	Milja Thureson	Finland	55.82	
25	1	Drita Islami	North Macedonia	55.86	
26	1	Duna Viñals	Andorra	57.71	NR
27	4	Norcady Reyes	Gibraltar	1:01.71	

=== Semi-finals ===
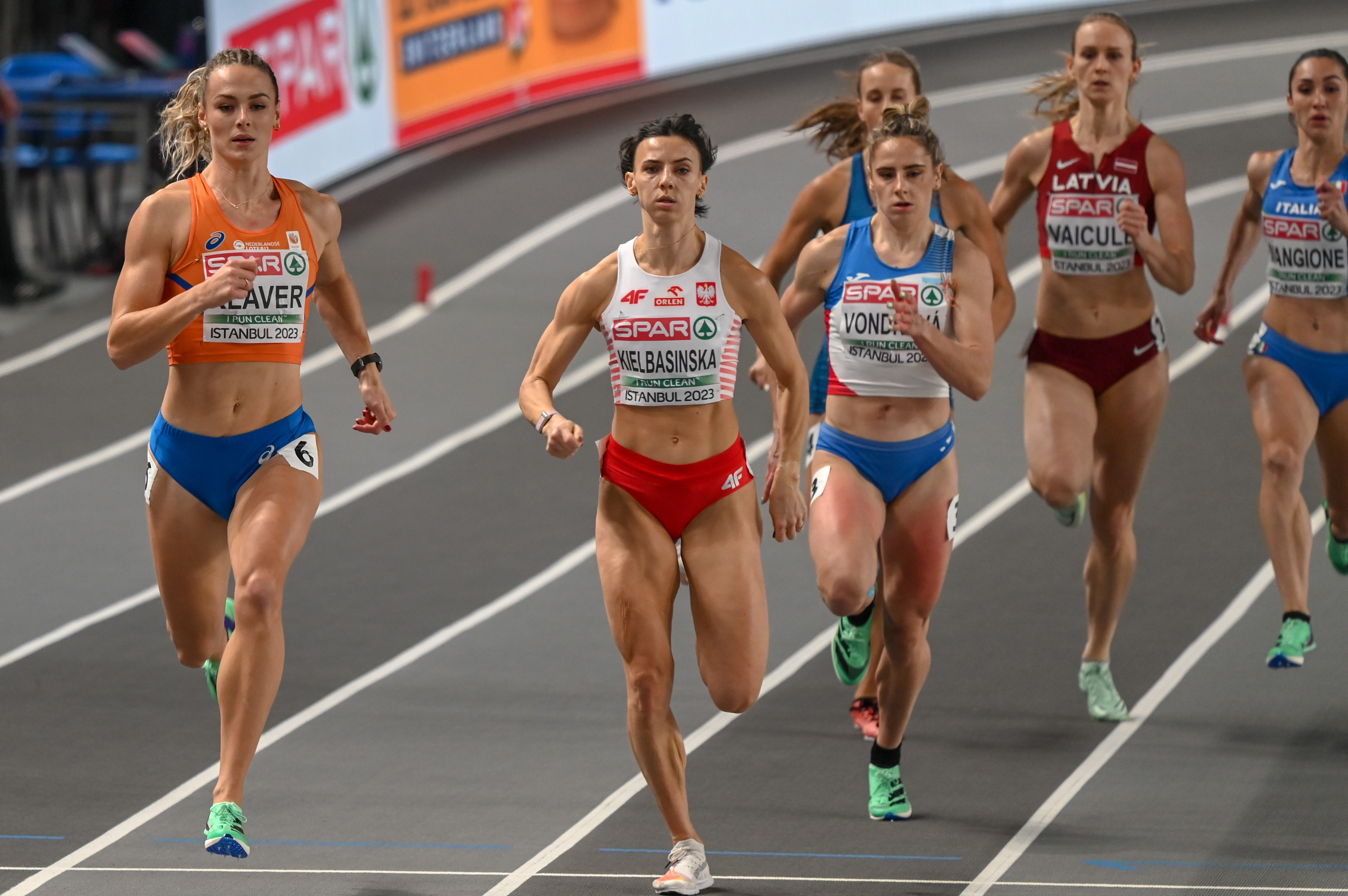
First heat of the semi-finals with Lieke Klaver, Anna Kiełbasińska, and Lada Vondrová in front

The two heats of the semi-finals were held on 3 March 2023, starting at 19:55 (UTC+3) in the evening. Of the twelve competing athletes from ten nations, the first three athletes in each heat (Q) advanced to the final. Viivi Lehikoinen of Finland was disqualified (DQ) for breaking technical rule 17.2.2 about jostling and obstruction (TR17.2.2).

Results of the semi-finals
Rank	Heat	Athlete	Nationality	Time	Note
1	1	Lieke Klaver	Netherlands	51.43	Q
2	1	Anna Kiełbasińska	Poland	51.67	Q
3	1	Lada Vondrová	Czech Republic	52.12	Q
4	2	Femke Bol	Netherlands	52.19	Q
5	2	Susanne Gogl-Walli	Austria	52.40	Q
6	2	Tereza Petržilková	Czech Republic	52.93	Q
7	2	Helena Ponette	Belgium	53.07	
8	2	Henriette Jæger	Norway	53.08	
9	2	Sharlene Mawdsley	Ireland	53.37	
10	1	Gunta Vaičule	Latvia	53.57	
11	1	Alice Mangione	Italy	53.66	
12	1	Viivi Lehikoinen	Finland	DQ	TR17.2.2

=== Final ===
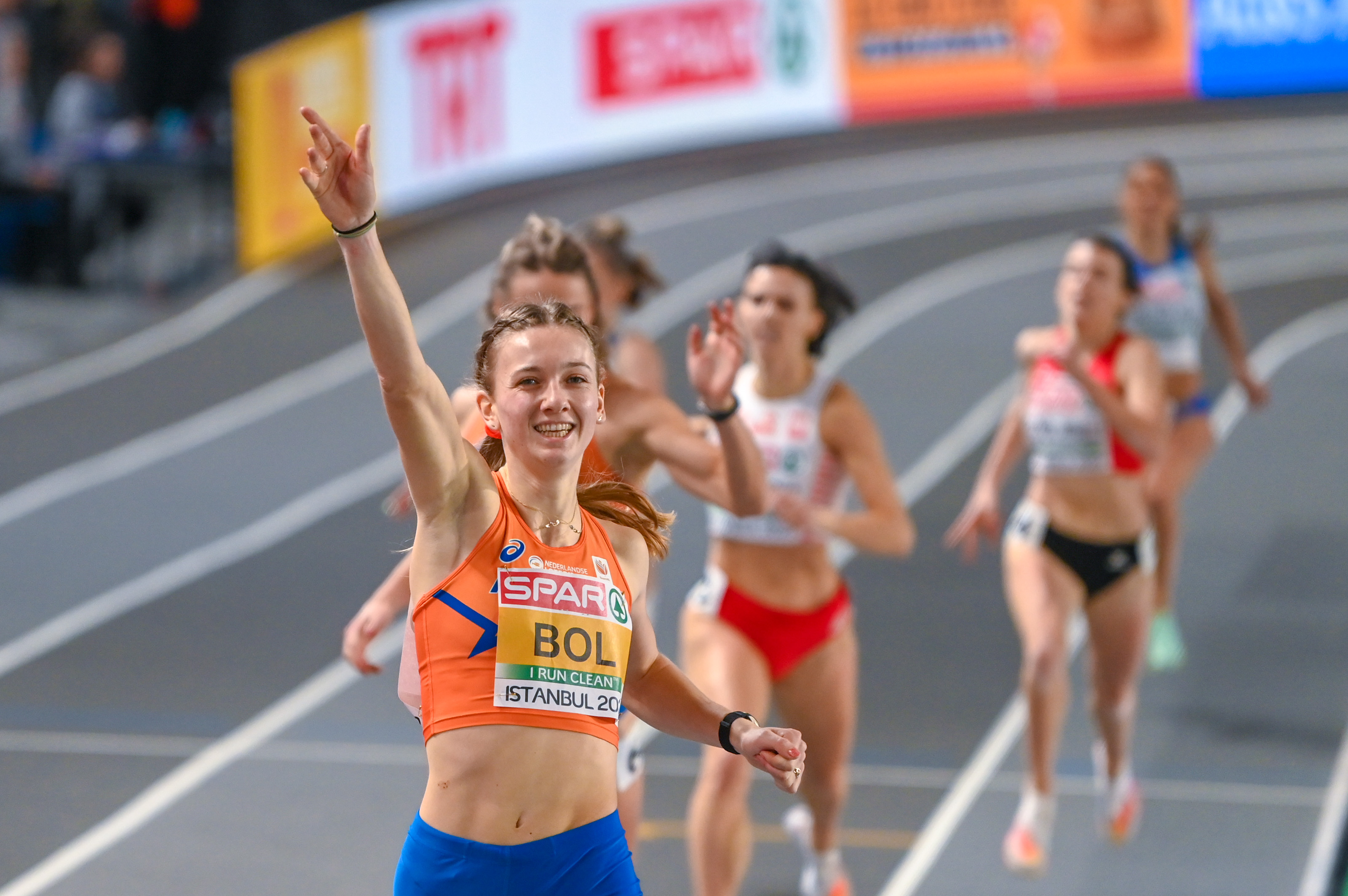
Femke Bol (in the front) finishing first in the final

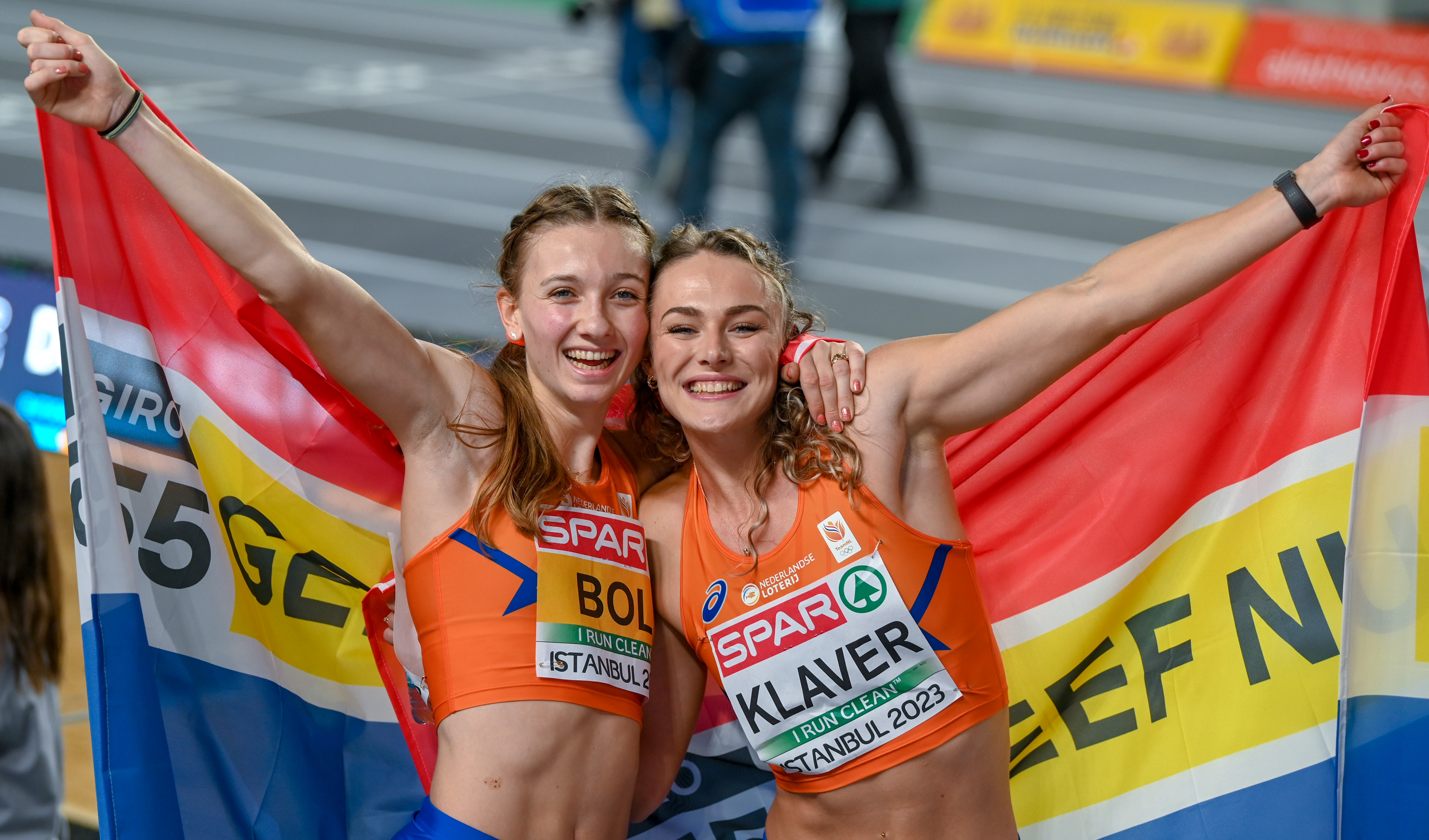
Femke Bol and Lieke Klaver holding Dutch flags with a call to donate money for humanitarian aid after the Turkey–Syria earthquakes

The final with the six remaining athletes from four nations was held on 4 March 2023 at 20:30 (UTC+3) in the evening. Femke Bol of the Netherlands was leading the race after about 100 metres and she completed the first lap of 200 metres in 23.78 s. Bol went on to win the gold medal after finishing the race in 49.85 s, successfully defending her title from 2021 with her third 400 metres indoor race under 50 seconds of 2023. Lieke Klaver of the Netherlands won silver in 50.57 s and Anna Kiełbasińska of Poland won bronze in 51.25 s. Outside the medals, Susanne Gogl-Walli of Austria set a national record (NR) of 51.73 s.

After the race, Bol and Klaver celebrated with Dutch flags with the texts giro 555 and geef nu meaning 'donate now [to] giro [account number] 555' printed on them, a call to donate money to the Dutch Cooperating Aid Organizations for humanitarian aid to the victims of the 2023 Turkey–Syria earthquakes a month earlier.

Results of the final
Rank	Lane	Athlete	Nationality	Time	Note
1st place, gold medalist(s)	5	Femke Bol	Netherlands	49.85	
2nd place, silver medalist(s)	6	Lieke Klaver	Netherlands	50.57	
3rd place, bronze medalist(s)	3	Anna Kiełbasińska	Poland	51.25	SB
4	4	Susanne Gogl-Walli	Austria	51.73	NR
5	2	Lada Vondrová	Czech Republic	51.73	
6	1	Tereza Petržilková	Czech Republic	52.81	
