= 2021 European Athletics Indoor Championships – Women's 4 × 400 metres relay =

Women's 4 × 400 metres relay at the 2021 European Athletics Indoor Championships
- Venue: Arena Toruń
- Location: Toruń, Poland
- Dates: 7 March 2021 (final)
- Teams: 6 nations
- Winning time: 3:27.15 min CR NR

Medalists
gold medal	Lieke Klaver; Marit Dopheide; Lisanne de Witte; Femke Bol	Netherlands
silver medal	Zoey Clark; Jodie Williams; Ama Pipi; Jessie Knight	Great Britain
bronze medal	Natalia Kaczmarek; Małgorzata Hołub-Kowalik; Kornelia Lesiewicz; Aleksandra Gaworska	Poland

The women's 4 × 400 metres relay at the 2021 European Athletics Indoor Championships took place over one round at the Arena Toruń in Toruń, Poland, on 7 March 2021. It was the eleventh time this relay was contested at the European Athletics Indoor Championships. Nations could qualify by their team's ranking or by the combined individual results of the team members.

Six nations competed in the final, which was won by the team of the Netherlands in a championship record and national record of 3:27.15 minutes, followed by the teams of Great Britain and Northern Ireland in 3:28.20 min and Poland in 3:29.94 min. Outside the medals, the Italian and Ukrainian team set national records of 3:30.32 min and 3:30.38 min respectively.

== Background ==
In the women's 4 × 400 metres relay, each team consists of four female athletes, who successively run two laps on a 200-metre track and pass on a baton between them. At the European Athletics Indoor Championships, the event was introduced in 2000 and had been contested ten times before 2021.

At the start of the 2021 championship, the world and European record was 3:23.37 min set by the team of Russia in 2006, the championship record was 3:27.56 min set by the team of Great Britain and Northern Ireland in 2013, and the world leading performance of the 2021 season was 3:26.27 min ran by the team of the Texas A&M University on 13 February 2021. The home team of Poland had won the title in 2019 and was the defending champion.

The 2021 championship was held at the Arena Toruń in Toruń, Poland. Due to the COVID-19 pandemic, there was a medical and sanitary protocol to prevent and contain infections.

Records before the 2021 European Athletics Indoor Championships
Record	Team	Time	Location	Date
World record	Russia (RUS)	3:23.37	Glasgow, United Kingdom	28 January 2006
European record	Russia (RUS)	3:23.37	Glasgow, United Kingdom	28 January 2006
Championship record	(United Kingdom) Great Britain and Northern Ireland (GBR)	3:27.56	Gothenburg, Sweden	3 March 2013
World leading	Texas A&M University	3:26.27	Fayetteville, Arkansas, United States	13 February 2021
European leading	N/A (Note: There were no teams under 3:30.00 min in 2021 before the championships.)			

== Qualification ==
Six teams could participate in this relay. One place was for the host nation, which was Poland. Three places were for the highest ranking nations based on their outdoor results from 2019 and 2020. The remaining two places were for the nations with the fastest accumulated times of the individual athletes from the 2021 indoor season until 22 February 2021. A final entry list with thirty-five athletes of six nations was published on 26 February 2021.

== Final ==
Six national teams competed in the final on 7 March 2021 at 19:10 (UTC+1). At the end of the first leg, Lieke Klaver of the Netherlands was the first to hand over the baton, followed by Zoey Clark of Great Britain and Northern Ireland and Corinna Schwab of Germany; Natalia Kaczmarek of Poland was fourth at the hand-over. At the end of the second leg, individual 400 m bronze medalist Jodie Williams of Great Britain had moved into the first position, followed by Malgorzata Holub-Kowalik of Poland and Laura Müller of Germany; Marit Dopheide of the Netherlands handed over in fourth place. During the third leg, Amarachi Pipi of Great Britain maintained her team's leading position, Lisanne de Witte of the Netherlands had moved up to the second position and Kornelia Lesiewicz of Poland had moved down to the third position. In the anchor leg, individual 400 m gold medalist Femke Bol of the Netherlands took over the lead, and she was followed by Jessie Knight of Great Britain and Aleksandra Gaworska of Poland.

The race was won by the team of the Netherlands in a championship record (CR), a European leading time (EL), and a Dutch record (NR) of 3:27.15 min, followed by the team of Great Britain and Northern Ireland in second place in 3:28.20 min and the team of Poland in third place in 3:29.94 min. Outside the medals, the Italian team set a national record (NR) of 3:30.32 min and the Ukrainian team set a national record (NR) of 3:30.38 min. Bol had the fastest split time of 49.99 s, 1.41 seconds faster than the next-fastest runner.

Several runners were interviewed after the race. Klaver said: "We all have good times individually. Then you know that you could get gold." To which Bol responded: "But you still need to do it." Clark said: "It was so exciting. Seeing everyone compete throughout the championships has really given me the buzz to get going. It was a really nice atmosphere and it was nice to be back running at a championship again." And about her opening leg, Clark said: "I knew it was going to be fast with Lieke Klaver on the outside. I knew she was going to go quick, so I just wanted to keep pace with her and make sure she didn't get away from me, so I could set the girls up well." Hołub-Kowalik said: "This bronze tastes like gold, after what happened to us a few minutes before the final," referring to individual 400 m silver medalist Justyna Święty-Ersetic, who had been replaced after being injured.

Results of the final
Rank	Nation	Athletes	Time	Notes
1st place, gold medalist(s)	Netherlands	Lieke Klaver; Marit Dopheide; Lisanne de Witte; Femke Bol	3:27.15	CR, EL, NR
2nd place, silver medalist(s)	(United Kingdom) Great Britain & N.I.	Zoey Clark; Jodie Williams; Ama Pipi; Jessie Knight	3:28.20	
3rd place, bronze medalist(s)	Poland	Natalia Kaczmarek; Małgorzata Hołub-Kowalik; Kornelia Lesiewicz; Aleksandra Gaworska	3:29.94	
4	Italy	Rebecca Borga; Alice Mangione; Eleonora Marchiando; Eloisa Coiro	3:30.32	NR
5	Ukraine	Viktoriya Tkachuk; Anastasiia Bryzgina; Kateryna Klymyuk; Anna Ryzhykova	3:30.38	NR
6	Germany	Corinna Schwab; Laura Müller; Brenda Cataria-Byll; Ruth Spelmeyer-Preuß	3:31.47	
