= Irini Vasiliou =

Greek sprinter (born 1990)

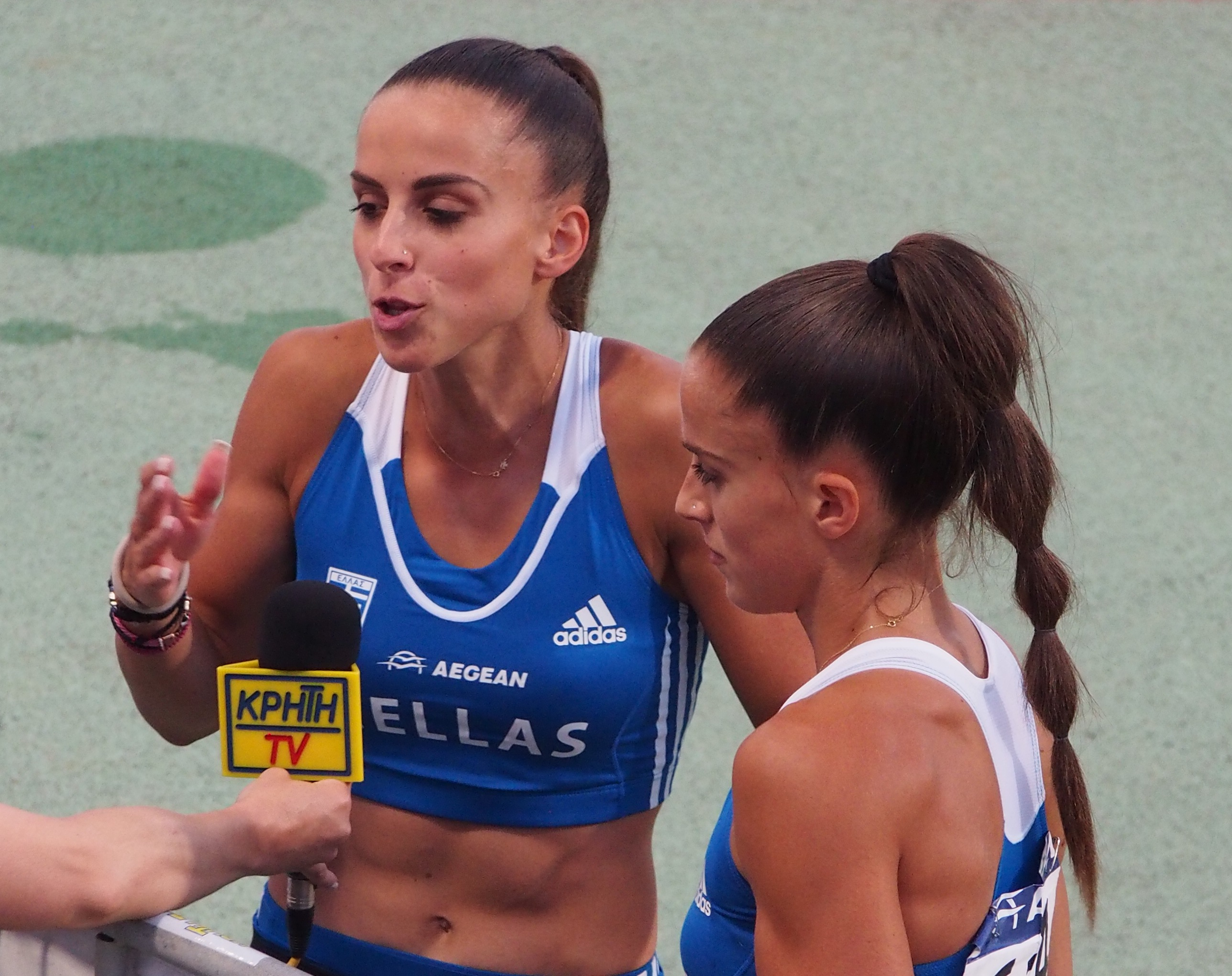
- Eirini and Anna Vasiliou

Personal information
- Nationality: Greek
- Born: 18 March 1990 (age 36) Heraklion, Greece
- Height: 1.69 m (5 ft 7 in)
- Weight: 58 kg (128 lb)

Sport
- Country: Greece
- Sport: Track and field
- Events: 400 metres 200 metres

Achievements and titles
- Personal bests: 400 m: 51.75 s (2019); 400 m (i): 52.76 s (2021); 200 m: 23.31 s (2019); 200 m (i): 23.51 s (2021)

Irini Vasiliou (Greek: Εἰρήνη Βασιλείου; born 18 March 1990) is a Greek sprinter. She competed in the 400 metres at the 2016 European Athletics Championships. At the 2016 Summer Olympics and the 2020 Summer Olympics she competed in the 400 metres.

Her twin sister Anna is also a 400 metres athlete.

== Competition record ==
Year	Competition	Venue	Position	Event	Notes
2016	European Championships	Amsterdam, Netherlands	14th (sf)	400 m	52.58
2016	European Championships	Amsterdam, Netherlands	10th (sf)	4 × 400 m relay	3:31.66 SB
2016	Olympic Games	Rio de Janeiro, Brazil	54th (h)	400 m	54.37
2017	World Championships	London, United Kingdom	23rd (sf)	400 m	53.27
2018	Mediterranean Games	Tarragona, Spain	7th	400 m	53.20
2018	European Championships	Berlin, Germany	26th (h)	400 m	53.37
2018	European Championships	Berlin, Germany	13th (h)	4 × 400 m relay	3:34.69
2019	European Indoor Championships	Glasgow, United Kingdom	26th (h)	400 m	53.66
2019	World Championships	Doha, Qatar	36th (h)	400 m	52.31
2021	European Indoor Championships	Toruń, Poland	16th (sf)	400 m	53.31
2021	Olympic Games	Tokyo, Japan	35th (h)	400 m	53.16
2022	World Indoor Championships	Belgrade, Serbia	25th (h)	400 m	53.62
2023	European Indoor Championships	Istanbul, Turkey	19th (h)	400 m	53.71
