= Lisanne de Witte =

Dutch sprinter

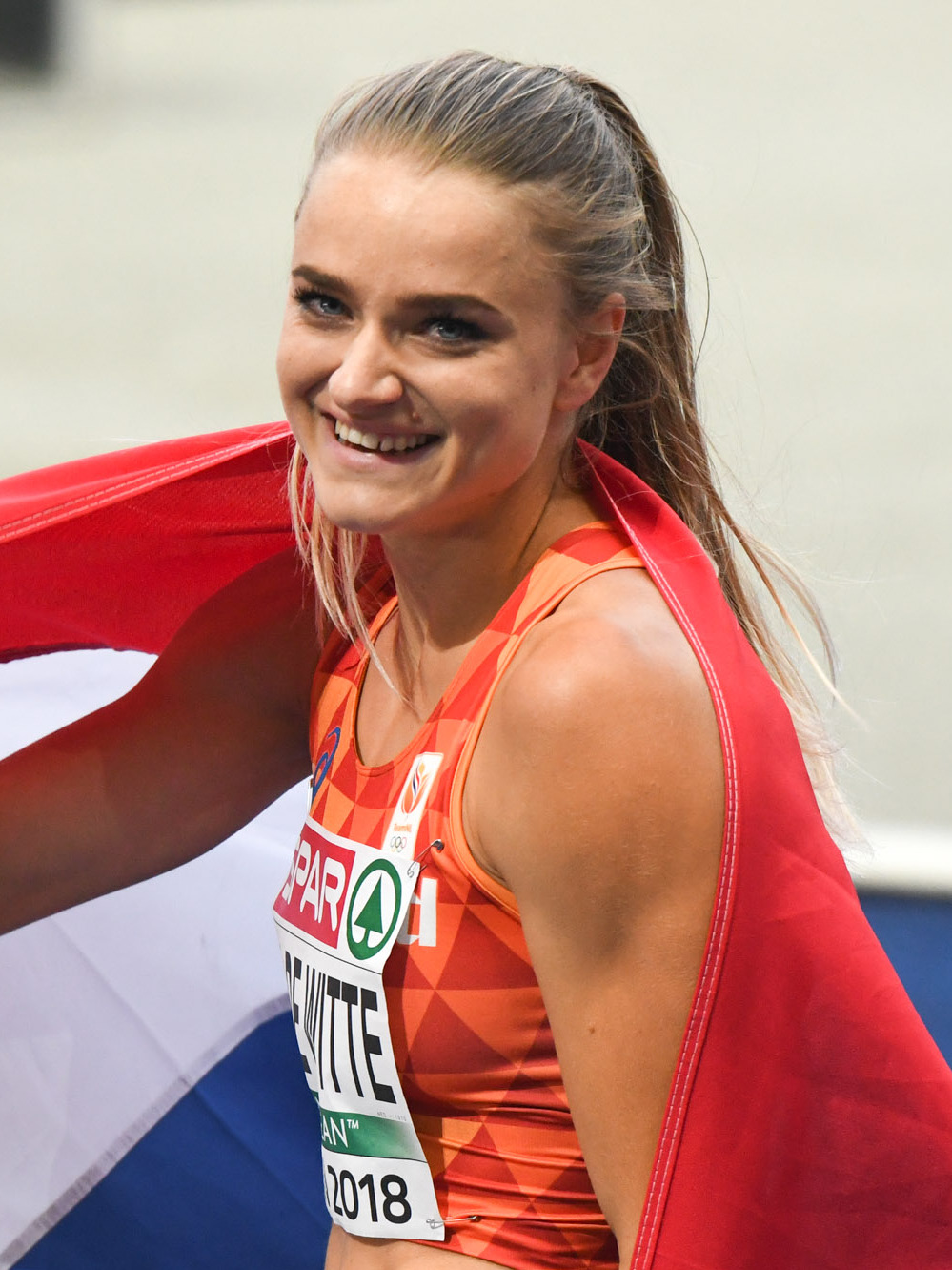
- De Witte after winning bronze in the 400 m at the 2018 European Championships in Berlin

Personal information
- Born: 10 September 1992 (age 33) Vlaardingen, Netherlands
- Height: 1.75 m (5 ft 9 in)
- Weight: 60 kg (132 lb)
- Life partners: Owen Westerhout (2014–2019); Dan Vernon (2019–present)

Sport
- Sport: Track and field
- Event: 400 metres
- Club: AV Trias
- Coached by: Sven Ootjers (2016–present)

Achievements and titles
- Highest world ranking: No. 5 (400 m, 2019); No. 156 (overall, 2020)
- Personal bests: Outdoor; 200 m: 23.93 (2021); 400 m: 50.77 (2018); 800 m: 2:05.39 (2013); Indoor; 200 m sh: 23.67 i (2019); 400 m sh: 51.90 i (2020); 800 m sh: 2:07.61 i (2024)
Medal record
Women's athletics
Representing the Netherlands
Olympic Games
Silver medal – second place	2024 Paris	4 × 400 m relay
World Championships
Gold medal – first place	2023 Budapest	4 × 400 m relay
Bronze medal – third place	2025 Tokyo	4 × 400 m relay
World Indoor Championships
Gold medal – first place	2024 Glasgow	4 × 400 m relay
Silver medal – second place	2022 Belgrade	4 × 400 m relay
European Championships
Gold medal – first place	2022 Munich	4 × 400 m relay
Gold medal – first place	2024 Rome	4 × 400 m relay
Bronze medal – third place	2018 Berlin	400 m
European Indoor Championships
Gold medal – first place	2021 Toruń	4 × 400 m relay
Bronze medal – third place	2019 Glasgow	400 m

Lisanne de Witte (pronounced [liˈsɑnə də ˈʋɪtə]; born 10 September 1992) is a Dutch retired track and field athlete who competed in sprinting and middle-distance running. She specialised in the 400 metres, where she held the Dutch record with her personal best time of 50.77 seconds from 2018 to 2021.

De Witte represented the Netherlands at the 2016, 2020, and 2024 Summer Olympics. She won bronze medals in the 400 m at the 2018 European Championships and 2019 European Indoor Championships. She won a total of nine Dutch national titles in the 200 m, 400 m, and 800 m.

De Witte also won several international championship medals as part of Dutch women's 4 × 400 m relay teams, including gold medals at the 2023 World Championships and 2024 World Indoor Championships and a silver medal at the 2024 Summer Olympics.

== Early life ==
De Witte was born on 10 September 1992 in Vlaardingen in the Netherlands. She has a younger sister, Laura de Witte, who is also a 400 metres sprinter.

== Career ==
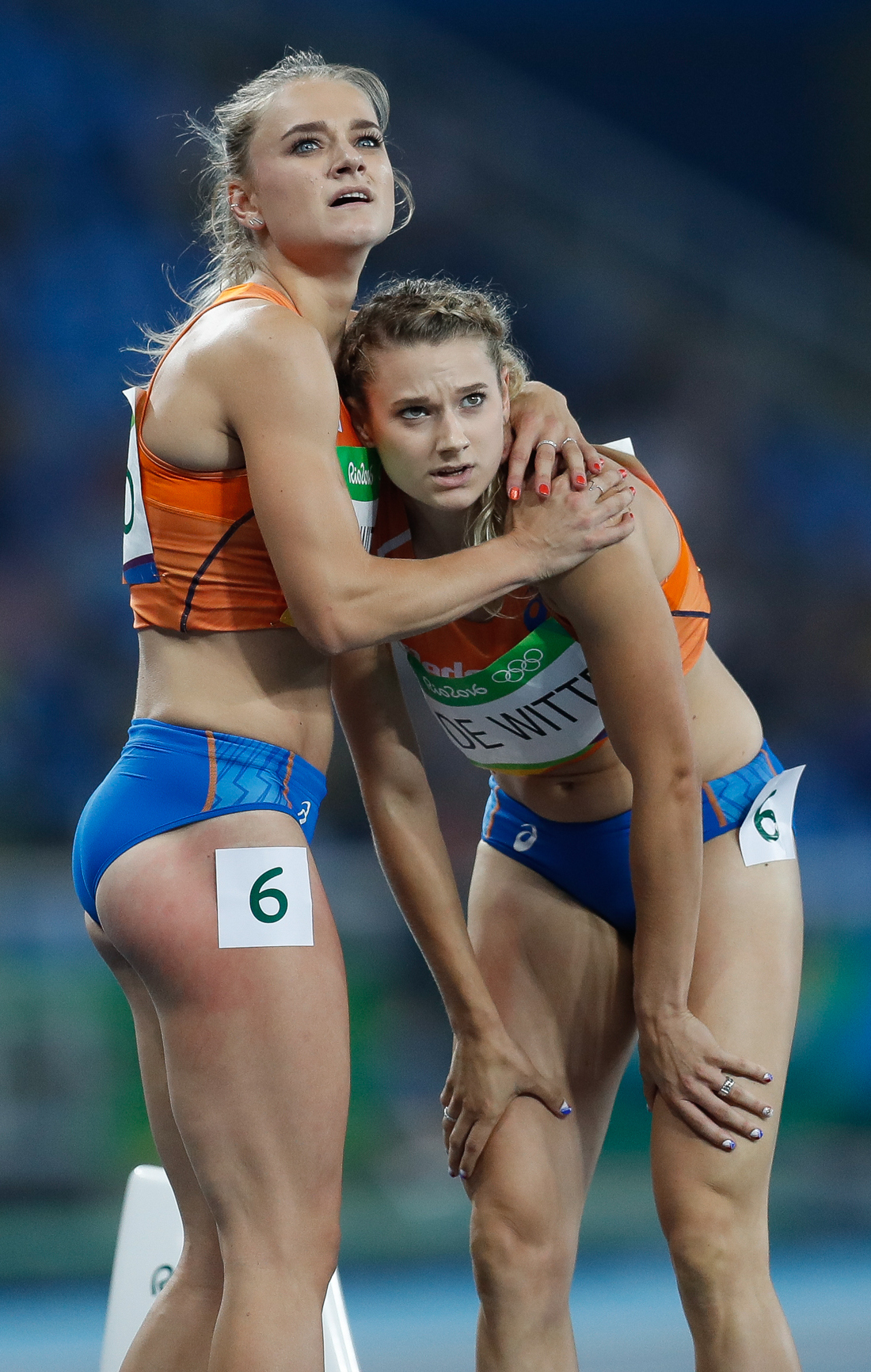
Sisters De Witte (L) and Laura de Witte (R) competed in the 4 × 400 m relay at the 2016 Summer Olympics.

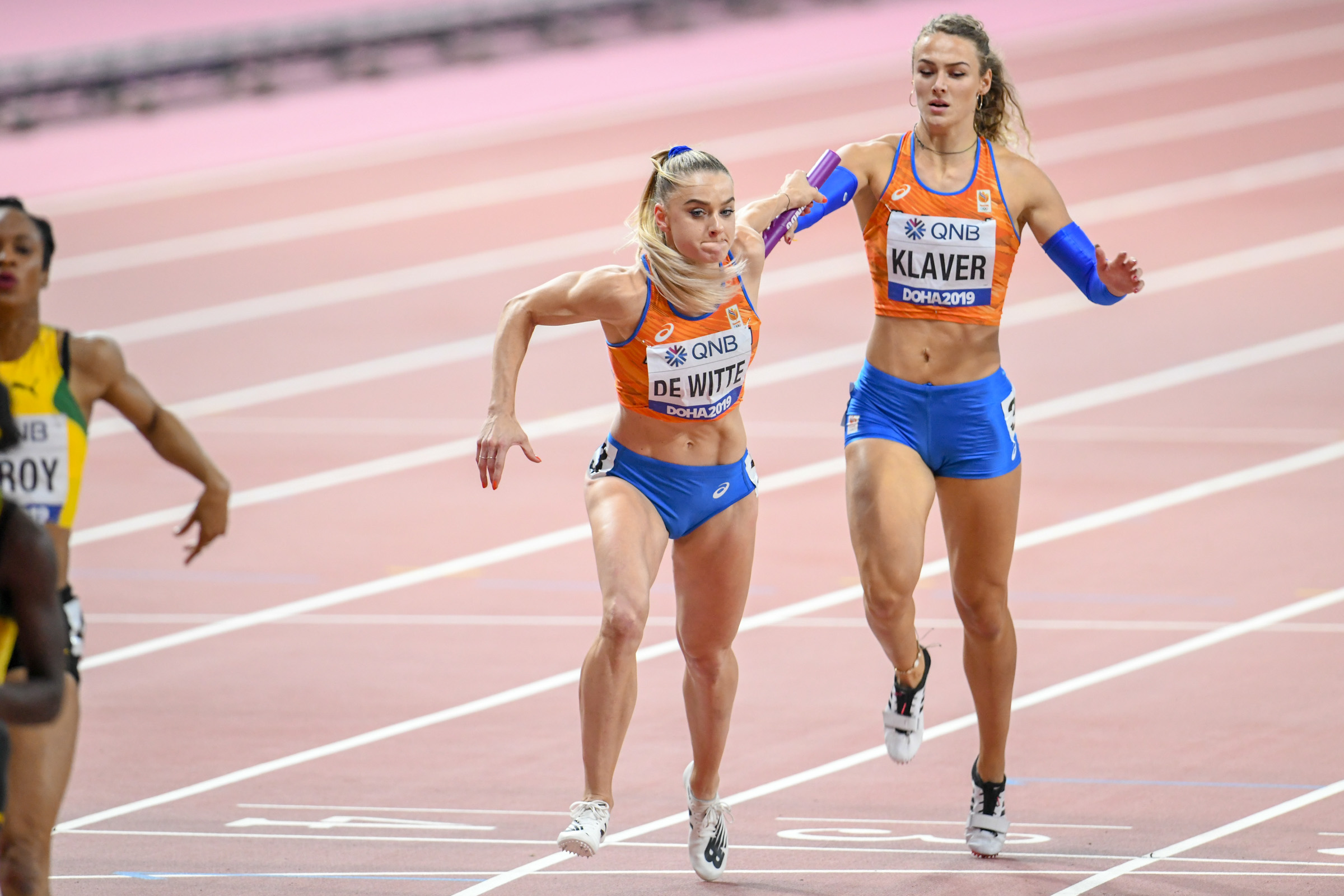
Lieke Klaver (R) passes the baton to De Witte (L) in the 4 × 400 m relay at the 2019 World Championships.

De Witte started representing the Netherlands in international championships in 2011. She competed at her first Summer Olympics in August 2016, where she ran in the 4 × 400 m relay. The Dutch team set a new national record with a time of 3:26.98 in the heats, but they did not advance to the final.

In August 2017, De Witte competed at the World Championships. She ran in the heats of the 400 m and did not advance to the semi-finals. She then ran in the heats of the 4 × 400 m relay, where the Dutch team was disqualified.

In August 2018, De Witte competed at the 2018 European Championships. She won the bronze medal in the 400 m and broke the Dutch national record with a time of 50.77 seconds. Her record stood until Femke Bol broke it in 2021.

In March 2019, De Witte competed at the European Indoor Championships. She won the bronze medal in the 400 m with a time of 52.34 seconds. In September and October, De Witte competed at the World Championships. In the 400 m, she finished 11th in the semi-finals and did not advance to the final. She then ran in the heats and final of the 4 × 400 m relay, and the Dutch team finished seventh.

In March 2021, De Witte competed at the European Indoor Championships. She ran in the final of the 4 × 400 m relay and won a gold medal with the Dutch team. In July and August, De Witte competed at her second Summer Olympics. She ran in the heats of the mixed 4 × 400 m relay, and the Dutch team finished fourth in the final. In the 400 m, De Witte qualified for the semi-finals but did not advance to the final. She then ran in the heats and final of the 4 × 400 m relay. The Dutch team set two national records, 3:24.01 in the heats and 3:23.74 in the final, and finished sixth.

In March 2022, De Witte competed at the World Indoor Championships. She ran in the heats and final of the 4 × 400 m relay, winning a silver medal with the Dutch team. In August, De Witte competed at the European Championships. She ran in the heats and final of the 4 × 400 m relay, winning a gold medal with the Dutch team.

In August 2023, De Witte competed at the World Championships. She ran in the heats of the 4 × 400 m relay, and the Dutch team finished first in the final, earning her a gold medal.

In March 2024, De Witte competed at the World Indoor Championships. She ran in the heats and final of the 4 × 400 m relay, winning a gold medal with the Dutch team.

On 25 July 2026, De Witte competed in the 400 m at the 2026 Dutch Athletics Championships in Hengelo, after which she retired as an athlete.

== Personal bests ==
=== Individual events ===
Personal best times for individual events
Event		Time	Location	Date	Record	Notes
60 metres		7.96 i	Apeldoorn, Netherlands	25 January 2014		
100 metres		12.32	Heiloo, Netherlands	17 May 2012		(Wind: +0.6 m/s)
100 metres		12.32	Lier, Belgium	30 June 2013		(Wind: +0.1 m/s)
150 metres		18.51	Lisse, Netherlands	11 May 2013		(Wind: +0.6 m/s)
200 metres	long track	23.93 Mx	Grootebroek, Netherlands	9 July 2021		(Wind: +0.8 m/s)
200 metres	long track	24.59 Wo	Lier, Belgium	30 June 2013		(Wind: +0.5 m/s)
200 metres	short track	23.67 i	Apeldoorn, Netherlands	17 February 2019		De Witte's outright 200 m best
300 metres	long track	37.75	Lisse, Netherlands	11 May 2024		
400 metres	long track	50.77	Berlin, Germany	11 August 2018	(NR)	The Dutch record was broken by Femke Bol on 29 May 2021.
400 metres	short track	51.90 i	Toruń, Poland	8 February 2020		
500 metres	short track	1:09.87 i	Boston, United States	4 February 2023		
600 metres	long track	1:27.10	Lisse, Netherlands	11 May 2024		
800 metres	long track	2:05.39	Merksem, Belgium	24 August 2013		
800 metres	short track	2:07.61 i	Apeldoorn, Netherlands	27 January 2024		

==== Progression ====
Season's best times for individual events
Year	400 m	400 m indoor
2009	56.16	57.72
2010	55.96	58.99
2011	54.59	55.97
2012	53.92	54.73
2013	52.92	55.68
2014	—N/a	52.61
2015	52.53	—N/a
2016	52.14	52.49
2017	51.71	52.43
2018	**50.77**	54.10
2019	51.30	52.34
2020	—N/a	**51.90**
2021	51.68	52.82
2022	52.71	52.65
2023	52.23	52.61
2024	51.44	53.04
2025	51.71	53.73
2026	55.65	—N/a

Lifetime best (in bold)

=== Team events ===
Personal best times for team events
Type	Event	Time	Location	Date	Record	Notes
Women's	4 × 400 metres relay	3:19.50	Stade de France, France	10 August 2024	NR	Teamed with Lieke Klaver, Cathelijn Peeters, and Femke Bol. De Witte's split time for the third leg was 50.20 s.
Women's	4 × 400 metres relay short track	3:25.07 i	Glasgow, United Kingdom	3 March 2024	(NR)	Dutch record until 9 March 2025. Teamed with Lieke Klaver, Cathelijn Peeters, and Femke Bol. De Witte's split time for the third leg was 52.28 s.
Women's	Distance medley relay short track	10:49.39 i	Boston, United States	28 January 2017		Teamed with Esther Guerrero (Spain), Anna Silvander (Sweden), and Sarah McDonald (Great Britain).
Mixed	4 × 400 metres relay	3:10.69	Tokyo, Japan	30 July 2021	(NR)	Dutch record until 31 July 2021. Teamed with Jochem Dobber, Lieke Klaver, and Ramsey Angela.

== Competition results ==
=== International competitions ===
Achievements in international competitions representing the Netherlands
Year	Competition	Location	Position	Event	Time	Notes
2011	European Junior Championships	Tallinn, Estonia	4th	4 × 400 m relay	3:37.44	
2013	European Team Championships, First League	Dublin, Ireland	4th	4 × 400 m relay	3:39.19	
2013	European U23 Championships	Tampere, Finland	8th	400 m	53.97	
2014	World Indoor Championships	Sopot, Poland	– (sf)	400 m	DQ	
2015	European Team Championships, First League	Heraklion, Greece	3rd	4 × 400 m relay	3:33.30	
2016	World Indoor Championships	Portland, United States	10th (sf)	400 m	53.35 i	
2016	European Championships	Amsterdam, Netherlands	9th (sf)	400 m	52.37	
2016	European Championships	Amsterdam, Netherlands	6th	4 × 400 m relay	3:29.23	
2016	Olympic Games	Rio de Janeiro, Brazil	11th (h)	4 × 400 m relay	3:26.98	NR
2017	European Indoor Championships	Belgrade, Serbia	16th	400 m	54.81 i	(h: 53.61)
2017	European Team Championships, Super League	Villeneuve-d'Ascq, France	1st	400 m	51.71	
2017	European Team Championships, Super League	Villeneuve-d'Ascq, France	6th	4 × 400 m relay	3:31.79	
2017	World Championships	London, United Kingdom	30th (h)	400 m	52.48	
2017	World Championships	London, United Kingdom	– (h)	4 × 400 m relay	DQ	
2018	European Championships	Berlin, Germany	3rd	400 m	50.77	NR
2018	Continental Cup	Ostrava, Czech Republic	4th	400 m	51.51	(Note: Representing Europe.)
2018	Continental Cup	Ostrava, Czech Republic	– (f)	4 × 400 m mixed	DQ	(Note: Representing Europe.)
2019	European Indoor Championships	Glasgow, United Kingdom	3rd	400 m	52.34 i	
2019	World Relays	Yokohama, Japan	7th	4 × 400 m relay	3:29.03	(1st in Final B)
2019	European Team Championships, First League	Sandnes, Norway	1st	400 m	52.05	
2019	World Championships	Doha, Qatar	11th (sf)	400 m	51.41	
2019	World Championships	Doha, Qatar	7th	4 × 400 m relay	3:27.89	(Note: Dutch team ran 3:27.40 in the heats.)
2021	European Indoor Championships	Toruń, Poland	12th (sf)	400 m	53.10 i	
2021	European Indoor Championships	Toruń, Poland	1st	4 × 400 m relay	3:27.15 i	CR NR
2021	World Relays	Chorzów, Poland	4th	4 × 400 m relay	3:30.12	(Note: Dutch team ran 3:28.40 in the heats.)
2021	Olympic Games	Tokyo, Japan	24th (sf)	400 m	52.09	(h: 51.68)
2021	Olympic Games	Tokyo, Japan	6th	4 × 400 m relay	3:23.74	NR
2021	Olympic Games	Tokyo, Japan	4th	4 × 400 m mixed	3:10.69	NR (Note: Time from the heats; De Witte was replaced in the final.)
2022	World Indoor Championships	Belgrade, Serbia	2nd	4 × 400 m relay	3:28.57 i	
2022	European Championships	Munich, Germany	1st	4 × 400 m relay	3:20.87	NR
2023	European Indoor Championships	Istanbul, Turkey	18th (h)	400 m	53.61 i	
2023	World Championships	Budapest, Hungary	5th (h)	4 × 400 m relay	3:23.75	
2024	World Indoor Championships	Glasgow, United Kingdom	1st	4 × 400 m relay	3:25.07 i	
2024	European Championships	Rome, Italy	1st	4 × 400 m relay	3:22.39	(50.41 split)
2024	Olympic Games	Paris, France	2nd	4 × 400 m relay	3:19.50	NR (50.20 split)
2025	World Championships	Tokyo, Japan	3rd	4 × 400 m relay	3:20.18	

=== Circuit wins and titles ===
- World Athletics Continental Tour
  400 metres wins, times (in seconds) specified in parentheses:
  - 2024 (1): Grifone (52.45)
- World Athletics Indoor Tour
  400 metres overall winner: 2016
  400 metres wins, other events and times (in minutes:seconds) specified in parentheses:
  - 2016 (1): Stockholm (53.21 i)
  - 2020 (2): Boston (500 m, 1:10.50 i), Düsseldorf (52.30 i)

=== National titles ===
- Dutch Athletics Championships
  - 400 metres: 2016, 2017, 2019, 2021, 2024
  - 800 metres: 2015
- Dutch Indoor Athletics Championships
  - 200 metres: 2019, 2020
  - 400 metres: 2016
