= 2021 European Athletics Indoor Championships – Women's 400 metres =

Women's 400 metres at the 2021 European Athletics Indoor Championships
- Venue: Arena Toruń
- Location: Toruń, Poland
- Dates: 5 March 2021 (round 1 and semi-finals); 6 March 2021 (final)
- Competitors: 39 from 21 nations
- Winning time: 50.63 s i NR

Medalists
gold medal	Femke Bol	Netherlands
silver medal	Justyna Święty-Ersetic	Poland
bronze medal	Jodie Williams	Great Britain

The women's 400 metres at the 2021 European Athletics Indoor Championships was held over three rounds at the Arena Toruń in Toruń, Poland, on 5 and 6 March 2021.

Thirty-nine athletes competed in round 1, where eighteen advanced to the semi-finals. Justyna Święty-Ersetic of Poland set a national record of 51.34 s in the semi-finals. Six athletes advanced to final, that was won by Femke Bol of the Netherlands in a national record of 50.63 seconds, followed by Święty-Ersetic in second place in 51.41 seconds, and Jodie Williams of Great Britain and Northern Ireland in third place in 51.73 seconds.

== Background ==
Records before the 2021 European Athletics Indoor Championships
Record	Athlete (nation)	Time	Location	Date
World record	Jarmila Kratochvílová (TCH)	49.59	Milan, Italy	7 March 1982
European record	Jarmila Kratochvílová (TCH)	49.59	Milan, Italy	7 March 1982
Championship record	Jarmila Kratochvílová (TCH)	49.59	Milan, Italy	7 March 1982
World Leading	Shaunae Miller-Uibo (BAH)	50.21	New York City, New York, United States	13 February 2021
European Leading	Femke Bol (NED)	50.64	Apeldoorn, Netherlands	21 February 2021

== Qualification ==
The qualification period for this event was from 1 May 2019 to 24 February 2021. Athletes could qualify by achieving the entry standard of 52.00 s outdoor or 53.75 s indoor. A maximum of four athletes per nation could be entered, of whom three could participate. There was a target number of thirty athletes.

== Rounds ==
=== Round 1 ===
Thirty-nine athletes from twenty-one nations competed in the seven heats of the first round on 5 March in the morning, starting at 11:22 (UTC+1). Eighteen athletes, the two fastest in each heat (Q) and the next four fastest overall (q), qualified for the semi-finals. Five athletes ran a personal best (PB) and seven athletes ran a season's best (SB) in this round.

Results of round 1
Rank	Heat	Athlete	Nation	Time	Note
1	5	Phil Healy	Ireland	52.00	Q
2	3	Justyna Święty-Ersetic	Poland	52.06	Q
3	3	Jessie Knight	(United Kingdom) Great Britain and N.I.	52.17	Q, SB
4	5	Léa Sprunger	Switzerland	52.25	Q
5	3	Cynthia Bolingo Mbongo	Belgium	52.27	q, SB
6	4	Jodie Williams	(United Kingdom) Great Britain and N.I.	52.35	Q
7	5	Modesta Justė Morauskaitė	Lithuania	52.52	q, PB
8	4	Andrea Miklós	Romania	52.57	Q
9	6	Ama Pipi	(United Kingdom) Great Britain and N.I.	52.63	Q, SB
10	3	Kateryna Klymyuk	Ukraine	52.70	q, PB
11	5	Rebecca Borga	Italy	52.72	q
12	4	Alice Mangione	Italy	52.73	PB
13	2	Lieke Klaver	Netherlands	52.74	Q
14	7	Irini Vasiliou	Greece	52.76	Q, PB
15	2	Anna Ryzhykova	Ukraine	52.76	Q
16	1	Femke Bol	Netherlands	52.77	Q
17	6	Lisanne de Witte	Netherlands	52.82	Q, =SB
18	6	Lada Vondrová	Czech Republic	52.83	
19	1	Hanna Mikhailava	Belarus	52.96	Q
20	7	Agnė Šerkšnienė	Lithuania	53.00	Q
21	1	Laura Müller	Germany	53.03	
22	6	Corinna Schwab	Germany	53.06	
23	7	Amandine Brossier	France	53.23	
24	3	Cátia Azevedo	Portugal	53.28	SB
25	3	Maja Ćirić	Serbia	53.28	SB
26	2	Sophie Becker	Ireland	53.31	
27	4	Susanne Walli	Austria	53.41	PB
28	1	Tereza Petržilková	Czech Republic	53.46	
29	7	Anastasiia Bryzgina	Ukraine	53.50	
30	5	Hanne Maudens	Belgium	53.63	
31	4	Aauri Lorena Bokesa	Spain	53.64	
32	2	Camille Laus	Belgium	53.68	
33	7	Sharlene Mawdsley	Ireland	53.68	
34	4	Iveta Putalová	Slovakia	53.69	SB
35	2	Eleonora Marchiando	Italy	53.70	
36	2	Krystsina Muliarchik	Belarus	53.93	
37	1	Andrea Jiménez	Spain	54.34	
38	1	Silke Lemmens	Switzerland	54.48	
39	6	Evelin Nádházy	Hungary	55.11	

=== Semi-finals ===
Eighteen athletes from twelve nations competed in the three heats of the semi-finals on 5 March in the evening, starting at 19:33 (UTC+1). Six athletes, the fastest two in each heat (Q), qualified for the final. Justyna Święty-Ersetic of Poland set a national record (NR) of 51.34 s, two athletes ran a personal best (PB), and one athlete ran a season's best (SB).

Results of the semi-finals
Rank	Heat	Athlete	Nation	Time	Note
1	3	Femke Bol	Netherlands	51.17	Q
2	2	Justyna Święty-Ersetic	Poland	51.34	Q, NR
3	2	Lieke Klaver	Netherlands	52.09	Q
4	3	Jodie Williams	(United Kingdom) Great Britain and N.I.	52.09	Q, PB
5	2	Anna Ryzhykova	Ukraine	52.11	PB
6	2	Jessie Knight	(United Kingdom) Great Britain and N.I.	52.22	
7	1	Phil Healy	Ireland	52.41	Q
8	1	Andrea Miklós	Romania	52.41	Q
9	1	Amarachi Pipi	(United Kingdom) Great Britain and N.I.	52.54	SB
10	3	Léa Sprunger	Switzerland	52.64	
11	2	Agnė Šerkšnienė	Lithuania	53.09	
12	1	Lisanne de Witte	Netherlands	53.10	
13	1	Kateryna Klymyuk	Ukraine	53.10	
14	1	Hanna Mikhailava	Belarus	53.10	
15	3	Modesta Justė Morauskaitė	Lithuania	53.20	
16	3	Irini Vasiliou	Greece	53.31	
17	3	Cynthia Bolingo Mbongo	Belgium	53.74	
18	2	Rebecca Borga	Italy	54.23	

=== Final ===
Six athletes from five nations competed in the final on 6 March in the evening, starting at 20:25 (UTC+1). Femke Bol of the Netherlands won in a European leading performance (EL) and national record (NR) of 50.63 s, followed by Justyna Święty-Ersetic of Poland in second place in 51.41 s and Jodie Williams of Great Britain and Northern Ireland in third place in personal best (PB) of 51.63 s. Outside the medals, Phil Healy of Ireland also had a personal best time.

Results of the final
Rank	Lane	Athlete	Nation	Time	Note
1st place, gold medalist(s)	6	Femke Bol	Netherlands	50.63	EL, NR
2nd place, silver medalist(s)	5	Justyna Święty-Ersetic	Poland	51.41	
3rd place, bronze medalist(s)	1	Jodie Williams	(United Kingdom) Great Britain and N.I.	51.73	PB
4	4	Phil Healy	Ireland	51.94	PB
5	3	Lieke Klaver	Netherlands	52.03	
6	2	Andrea Miklós	Romania	52.10	
