= North Macedonia at the 2026 European Athletics Championships =

- WA code: MKD
- National federation: Athletic Federation of North Macedonia
- Website: www.afm.org.mk

in Birmingham, United Kingdom
- Competitors: 1 (1 man and 0 women)
- Medals: Gold 0 Silver 0 Bronze 0 Total 0

European Athletics Championships appearances
- 1998; 2002; 2006; 2010; 2012; 2014; 2016; 2018; 2022; 2024; 2026

North Macedonia competed at the 2026 European Athletics Championships in Birmingham, United Kingdom, between 10 and 16 August 2026. One male athlete is sent to represent the country.

== Medals ==
Medal	Name	Event	Date

== Results ==
The following athletes are selected to compete by the Athletic Federation of North Macedonia.

- including alternates

Key

- Note–Ranks given for track events are within the athlete's heat only
- Q = Qualified by place in Track Events or by standard in Field Events
- q = Qualified by time in Track Events or without standard in Field Events
- qR= Advanced to the next round by referee.
- NR = National record
- CHB = Championship best
- WL = World Leading
- PB = Personal best
- SB = Season's best
- — = Round not applicable for the event
- Bye = Athlete not required to compete in round
- DNF = Did Not Finish (Running or Race Walking Events)
- DNS = Did not start
- DQ = Disqualified
- NM = No Mark (No valid trial recorded in Field Events

Track and road events

Athlete	Event	Heat		Semifinal		Final	
Athlete	Event	Result	Rank	Result	Rank	Result	Rank
Dario Ivanovski	Men's marathon	—N/a					
