= Macedonia at the 2018 European Athletics Championships =

- WA code: MKD
- National federation: AFM
- Website: www.afm.org.mk

in Berlin
- Competitors: 2

European Athletics Championships appearances
- 1998; 2002; 2006; 2010; 2012; 2014; 2016; 2018; 2022; 2024

Macedonia competed at the 2018 European Athletics Championships in Berlin, Germany, from 6–12 August 2018. A delegation of 2 athletes were sent to represent the country.

The following athletes were selected to compete by the Athletic Federation of Macedonia.

Men
Track and road

Athletes	Event	Heats		Semifinal		Final	
Athletes	Event	Result	Rank	Result	Rank	Result	Rank
Dario Ivanovski	1500 metres	3:57.52	33	did not advance			

Women
Track and road

Athletes	Event	Heats		Semifinal		Final	
Athletes	Event	Result	Rank	Result	Rank	Result	Rank
Drita Islami	400 metres hurdles	1:02.23	21	did not advance			
