= 2019 European Athletics Team Championships =

2019 European Team Championships
- Host city: Bydgoszcz, Poland (Super League); Sandnes, Norway (First League); Varaždin, Croatia (Second League); Skopje, North Macedonia (Third League)
- Events: 40
- Dates: 9–11 August 2019

The 2019 European Athletics Team Championships (ETC) in athletics were held in four cities from 9–11 August 2019.

== Grouping and host cities ==
League	Date	Stadium	City	Nation
Super League	9–11 August 2019	Zdzisław Krzyszkowiak Stadium	Bydgoszcz	Poland
First League	9–11 August 2019	Sandnes Stadion	Sandnes	Norway
Second League	10–11 August 2019	Varaždin Sports Park	Varaždin	Croatia
Third League	10–11 August 2019	Toše Proeski Arena	Skopje	North Macedonia

- Grouping

Exceptionally, for this 2019 edition, the following relegation and promotion principles were used:

- The lowest 5 classified teams in the Super League shall be relegated to the First League. The first classified team of the First League shall be promoted to the Super League.
- Consequently, 5 lowest classified teams of the First League shall be relegated to the Second League, while the first classified team of the Second League shall be promoted to the First League. Consequently, 5 lowest classified teams of the Second League shall be relegated to the Third League, while the first classified team of the Third League shall be promoted to the Second League.
- The promotion/relegation system for 2019 edition is aimed at enabling the new system of distribution of teams among leagues (approved by European Athletics Council in April 2018) to come into force from 2021 edition. The new system is aimed to have 8 teams in the Super League (plus 1 if the host country not qualified), 12 teams in the First and Second Leagues, with the remaining teams in the Third League starting from 2021 edition of ETC.

== Super League ==
=== Participating countries ===
- Czech Republic
- Finland (promoted)
- France
- Germany
- Great Britain
- Greece
- Italy
- Poland
- Spain
- Sweden (promoted)
- Switzerland (promoted)
- Ukraine

=== Men's events ===
Event	First		Second		Third	
100 m Wind: -1.4 m/s	Jimmy Vicaut; France	10.35	Marcell Jacobs; Italy	10.39	Michael Pohl; Germany	10.55
200 m Wind: -1.0 m/s	Richard Kilty; Great Britain	20.66	Eseosa Desalu; Italy	20.69	Mouhamadou Fall; France	20.70
400 m	Davide Re; Italy	45.35	Dwayne Cowan; Great Britain	46.18	Óscar Husillos; Spain	46.36
800 m	Adam Kszczot; Poland	1:46.97	Jamie Webb; Great Britain	1:47.25	Álvaro de Arriba; Spain	1:47.48
1500 m	Marcin Lewandowski; Poland	3:47.88	Charlie Grice; Great Britain	3:48.35	Jakub Holuša; Czech Republic	3:49.18
3000 m	Adel Mechaal; Spain	8:02.51	Kalle Berglund; Sweden	8:02.79 PB	James West; Great Britain	8:02.97
5000 m	Yeman Crippa; Italy	13:43.30	Julien Wanders; Switzerland	13:45.31	Hugo Hay; France	13:58.20
3000 m steeplechase	Fernando Carro; Spain	8:27.26	Topi Raitanen; Finland	8:27.68	Krystian Zalewski; Poland	8:29.12 SB
110 m hurdles Wind: -1.8 m/s	Orlando Ortega; Spain	13.38	Pascal Martinot-Lagarde; France	13.46	Gregor Traber; Germany	13.54
400 m hurdles	Patryk Dobek; Poland	48.87	Ludvy Vaillant; France	48.98 SB	Luke Campbell; Germany	49.24 SB
4 × 100 m	Great Britain; Dominic Ashwell; Oliver Bromby; Richard Kilty; Harry Aikines-Aryeetey	38.73	Germany; Steven Müller; Marvin Schulte; Roy Schmidt; Michael Pohl	38.88	Ukraine; Erik Kostrytsya; Oleksandr Sokolov; Ihor Bodrov; Serhiy Smelyk	39.02
4 × 400 m	Italy; Edoardo Scotti; Matteo Galvan; Brayan Lopez; Davide Re	3:02.04 EL	France; Mamadou Kassé Hann; Christopher Naliali; Thomas Jordier; Loïc Prévot	3:02.08 SB	Poland; Wiktor Suwara; Rafał Omelko; Łukasz Krawczuk; Patryk Dobek	3:02.56 SB
High jump	Miguel Ángel Sancho; Spain	2.26 SB	Chris Baker; Great Britain	2.22	Stefano Sottile; Italy	2.22
Pole vault	Piotr Lisek; Poland	5.81	Melker Svärd Jakobsson; Sweden	5.71	Renaud Lavillenie; France	5.71
Long jump	Miltiadis Tentoglou; Greece	8.30	Eusebio Cáceres; Spain	8.02 w	Tomasz Jaszczuk; Poland	8.00
Triple jump	Ben Williams; Great Britain	17.14 PB	Simo Lipsanen; Finland	16.76	Benjamin Compaoré; France	16.67
Shot put	Michał Haratyk; Poland	21.83 CR	Tomáš Staněk; Czech Republic	20.65	Frédéric Dagée; France	20.03
Discus	Piotr Małachowski; Poland	63.02	Martin Wierig; Germany	61.84	Daniel Ståhl; Sweden	61.38
Hammer	Wojciech Nowicki; Poland	78.84	Quentin Bigot; France	76.70	Mihail Anastasakis; Greece	75.77
Javelin	Julian Weber; Germany	86.86 SB	Jakub Vadlejch; Czech Republic	79.88	Marcin Krukowski; Poland	79.54
WR world record | AR area record | CR championship record | GR games record | NR national record | OR Olympic record | PB personal best | SB season best | WL world leading (in a given season)

=== Women's events ===
Event	First		Second		Third	
100 m	Carolle Zahi; France	11.31	Daryll Neita; Great Britain	11.33	Ewa Swoboda; Poland	11.35
200 m	Mujinga Kambundji; Switzerland	22.72 SB	Jodie Williams; Great Britain	22.89	Jessica-Bianca Wessolly; Germany	23.15
400 m	Justyna Święty-Ersetic; Poland	51.23	Léa Sprunger; Switzerland	51.84	Maria Benedicta Chigbolu; Italy	52.19
800 m	Rénelle Lamote; France	2:01.21 SB	Shelayna Oskan-Clarke; Great Britain	2:01.45	Christina Hering; Germany	2:01.77
1500 m	Sofia Ennaoui; Poland	4:08.37	Caterina Granz; Germany	4:08.52	Kristiina Mäki; Czech Republic	4:09.12 SB
3000 m	Yolanda Ngarambe; Sweden	9:07.67	Marta Zenoni; Italy	9:08.34	Solange Pereira; Spain	9:09.76 PB
5000 m	Hanna Klein; Germany	15:39.00	Maitane Melero; Spain	15:44.55	Sarah Inglis; Great Britain	15:45.23
3000 m steeplechase	Gesa-Felicitas Krause; Germany	9:36.67	Irene Sánchez; Spain	9:39.24	Rosie Clarke; Great Britain	9:39.85
100 m hurdles	Luminosa Bogliolo; Italy	12.87	Cindy Roleder; Germany	12.87 SB	Karolina Kołeczek; Poland	12.88
400 m hurdles	Zuzana Hejnová; Czech Republic	55.10	Anna Ryzhykova; Ukraine	55.61	Joanna Linkiewicz; Poland	55.67
4 × 100 m	France; Carolle Zahi; Orlann Ombissa-Dzangue; Estelle Raffai; Sarah Richard-Mingas	43.09	Switzerland; Ajla del Ponte; Sarah Atcho; Mujinga Kambundji; Cornelia Halbheer	43.11	Great Britain; Kristal Awuah; Alisha Rees; Bianca Williams; Rachel Miller	43.46
4 × 400 m	Poland; Iga Baumgart-Witan; Anna Kiełbasińska; Małgorzata Hołub-Kowalik; Justyna Święty-Ersetic	3:24.81 EL	Great Britain; Emily Diamond; Jodie Williams; Zoey Clark; Jessica Turner	3:27.12 SB	Italy; Maria Benedicta Chigbolu; Ayomide Folorunso; Rebecca Borga; Giancarla Trevisan	3:27.32 SB
High jump	Yuliya Levchenko; Ukraine	1.97	Erika Kinsey; Sweden	1.94	Alessia Trost; Italy	1.94 =SB
Pole vault	Katerina Stefanidi; Greece	4.70	Maryna Kylypko; Ukraine	4.56; SB	Angelica Bengtsson; Sweden; Ninon Guillon-Romarin; France	4.46
Long jump	Malaika Mihambo; Germany	7.11	Abigail Irozuru; Great Britain	6.75 SB	Éloyse Lesueur; France	6.72 SB
Triple jump	Paraskevi Papachristou; Greece	14.48	Ana Peleteiro; Spain	14.27	Ottavia Cestonaro; Italy	14.18; PB
Shot put	Christina Schwanitz; Germany	18.93	Fanny Roos; Sweden	18.54	Sophie McKinna; Great Britain	17.94
Discus	Claudine Vita; Germany	61.09	Mélina Robert-Michon; France	60.61	Hrisoúla Anagnostopoúlou; Greece	59.02; SB
Hammer	Alexandra Tavernier; France	72.81	Joanna Fiodorow; Poland	72.13	Iryna Klymets; Ukraine	71.67
Javelin	Alexie Alaïs; France	63.46; PB	Maria Andrejczyk; Poland	63.39; SB	Irena Šedivá; Czech Republic	61.32; PB
WR world record | AR area record | CR championship record | GR games record | NR national record | OR Olympic record | PB personal best | SB season best | WL world leading (in a given season)

=== Mixed events ===
(Non scoring)

Event	First		Second		Third	
4 × 400 m	Great Britain; Niclas Baker; Yasmin Liverpool; Jessica Turner; Alex Knibbs	3:19.40 NB	Spain; Andrea Jiménez; Darwin Echeverry; Carmen Avilés; Bernat Erta	3:20.47 NB	France; Patrice Maurice; Élise Trynkler; Laurine Xailly; Mamadou Kassé Hann	3:20.91
WR world record | AR area record | CR championship record | GR games record | NR national record | OR Olympic record | PB personal best | SB season best | WL world leading (in a given season)

=== Score table ===
Event		CZE	FIN	FRA	GER	GBR	GRE	ITA	POL	ESP	SWE	SUI	UKR
100 metres	M	7	1	12	10	9	2	11	5	6	4	3	8
100 metres	W	7	4	12	5	11	6	8	10	9	2	1	3
200 metres	M	8	2	10	7	12	4	11	1	6	5	3	9
200 metres	W	1	4	9	10	11	8	6	7	5	2	12	3
400 metres	M	4	1	8	6	11	2	12	9	10	5	3	7
400 metres	W	8	1	9	4	7	3	10	12	2	5	11	6
800 metres	M	5	2	6	9	11	3	7	12	10	8	4	1
800 metres	W	5	9	12	10	11	1	2	7	6	3	4	8
1500 metres	M	10	3	8	7	11	2	6	12	0	9	5	4
1500 metres	W	10	9	3	11	7	1	4	12	8	6	2	5
3000 metres	M	6	1	4	8	10	2	9	3	12	11	7	5
3000 metres	W	2	6	5	8	4	3	11	9	10	12	7	1
5000 metres	M	7	2	10	0	5	6	12	4	9	8	11	3
5000 metres	W	5	3	9	12	10	0	8	4	11	7	6	2
3000 metre steeplechase	M	4	11	6	7	9	3	8	10	12	0	2	5
3000 metre steeplechase	W	5	9	7	12	10	2	4	8	11	3	6	1
110/100 metre hurdles	M	1	5	11	10	6	8	7	9	12	4	3	2
110/100 metre hurdles	W	3	8	4	11	9	6	12	10	5	1	2	7
400 metre hurdles	M	8	6	11	10	9	4	3	12	7	2	5	1
400 metre hurdles	W	12	2	6	4	7	1	9	10	3	5	8	11
4 × 100 metres relay	M	0	3	0	11	12	6	7	9	8	4	5	10
4 × 100 metres relay	W	5	3	12	9	10	2	7	6	8	1	11	4
4 × 400 metres relay	M	8	4	11	2	0	5	12	10	9	3	6	7
4 × 400 metres relay	W	4	1	7	8	11	5	10	12	6	2	3	9
High jump	M	2	1	7	9	11	5	10	8	12	4	3	6
High jump	W	3.5	0	5	9	2	7	10	8	3.5	11	6	12
Pole vault	M	7	4.5	10	4.5	3	9	8	12	6	11	2	0
Pole vault	W	7	4.5	9.5	0	4.5	12	8	3	2	9.5	6	11
Long jump	M	1	7	3	5	6	12	9	10	11	2	4	8
Long jump	W	3	8	10	12	11	7	5	2	9	6	4	1
Triple jump	M	2	11	10	6	12	7	5	8	4	9	1	3
Triple jump	W	1	8	3	7	6	12	10	5	11	2	4	8
Shot put	M	11	2	10	9	8	3	7	12	4	5	1	6
Shot put	W	7	6	3	12	10	2	5	9	4	11	1	8
Discus throw	M	6	2	5	11	3	4	9	12	8	10	1	7
Discus throw	W	4	8	11	12	5	10	7	9	2	3	1	6
Hammer throw	M	2	8	11	6	3	10	5	12	9	4	1	7
Hammer throw	W	7	5	12	8	3	2	9	11	6	1	4	10
Javelin throw	M	11	8	3	12	1	2	7	10	9	5	6	4
Javelin throw	W	10	7	12	4	1	8	6	11	9	3	2	5
Country		CZE	FIN	FRA	GER	GBR	GRE	ITA	POL	ESP	SWE	SUI	UKR
Total		219.5	190	316.5	317.5	302.5	197	316	345	294.5	210.5	175	225

=== Final standings ===
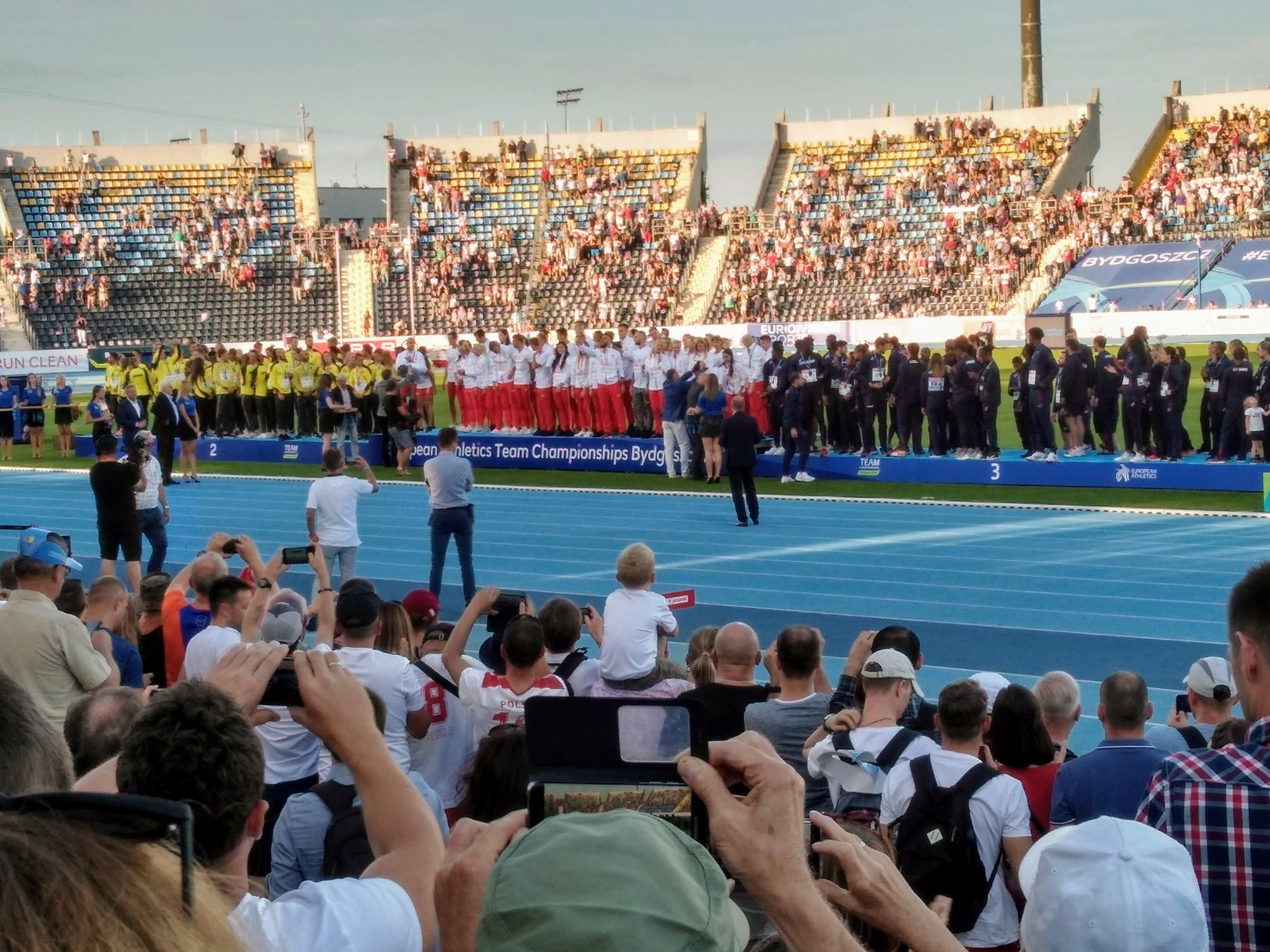

Pos	Country	Pts	Note
1	Poland	345	
2	Germany	317.5	
3	France	316.5	
4	Italy	316	
5	Great Britain	302.5	
6	Spain	294.5	
7	Ukraine	225	
8	Czech Republic	219.5	Relegation to the 2021 First League
9	Sweden	210.5	Relegation to the 2021 First League
10	Greece	197	Relegation to the 2021 First League
11	Finland	190	Relegation to the 2021 First League
12	Switzerland	175	Relegation to the 2021 First League

It is the first win ever for Poland.

== First League ==
=== Participating countries ===
One promotion in Super-League, 5 relegations to Second League (4 without not-entered Russia):

- Belarus (relegated)
- Belgium
- Hungary (promoted)
- Ireland
- Lithuania (promoted)
- Netherlands (relegated)
- Norway
- Portugal
- Romania
- Russia (not entered)
- Slovakia (promoted)
- Turkey

=== Men's events ===
Event	First		Second		Third	
100 m	Carlos Nascimento; Portugal	10.64	Hensley Paulina; Netherlands	10.67	Ján Volko; Slovakia	10.75
200 m	Chris Garia; Netherlands	20.85	Ján Volko; Slovakia	20.98	Robin Vanderbemden; Belgium	21.08
400 m	Jonathan Sacoor; Belgium	46.43	Christopher O'Donnell; Ireland	46.70; SB	Ricardo dos Santos; Portugal	46.74; SB
800 m	Balázs Vindics; Hungary	1:49.62	Mark English; Ireland	1:50.06	Mehmet Çelik; Turkey	1:50.24; SB
1500 m	Jakob Ingebrigtsen; Norway	3:43.43	Paulo Rosário; Portugal	3:45.18	Simas Bertašius; Lithuania	3:45.51
3000 m	Isaac Kimeli; Belgium	8:09.09	Henrik Ingebrigtsen; Norway	8:09.72	Mike Foppen; Netherlands	8:09.75
5000 m	Filip Ingebrigtsen; Norway	13:37.09	Aras Kaya; Turkey	13:53.95; SB	Nicolae Soare; Romania	13:54.88; PB
3000 m steeplechase	Tom Erling Kårbø; Norway	8:52.00	André Pereira; Portugal	8:53.60	Justinas Beržanskis; Lithuania	8:53.86
110 m hurdles	Vitali Parakhonka; Belarus	13.73	Michael Obasuyi; Belgium	13.76	Valdó Szűcs; Hungary	13.92
400 m hurdles	Yasmani Copello; Turkey	49.23	Nick Smidt; Netherlands	49.99	Dylan Owusu; Belgium	50.91
4 × 100 m	Turkey; Kayhan Özer; Jak Ali Harvey; Emre Zafer Barnes; Yiğitcan Hekimoğlu	39.46	Portugal; Frederico Curvelo; Diogo Antunes; Carlos Nascimento; Delvis Santos	39.79	Belgium; Gaylord Kuba; Andreas Vranken; Antoine Snyders; Charles Niesen	40.07
4 × 400 m	Turkey; Batuhan Altıntaş; Yavuz Can; İlyas Çanakçı; Yasmani Copello	no time available	Netherlands; Ramsey Angela; Tony van Diepen; Jochem Dobber; Terrence Agard		Ireland; Christopher O'Donnell; Andrew Mellon; Cathal Crosbie; Harry Purcell	3:08.83
High jump	Alperen Acet; Turkey	2.21	Dzmitry Nabokau; Belarus	2.18	Matúš Bubeník; Slovakia	2.18
Pole vault	Sondre Guttormsen; Norway	5.51	Ben Broeders; Belgium	5.46	Ersu Şaşma; Turkey	5.41
Long jump	Tomáš Veszelka; Slovakia	7.79; PB	Uladzislau Bulakhau; Belarus	7.78; SB	Ingar Kiplesund; Norway	7.76
Triple jump	Pedro Pichardo; Portugal	16.98	Răzvan Cristian Grecu; Romania	16.82 w	Tomáš Veszelka; Slovakia	16.51
Shot put	Denzel Comenentia; Netherlands	20.61	Aliaksei Nichypar; Belarus	19.90	Marcus Thomsen; Norway	19.62
Discus	Ola Stunes Isene; Norway	64.80	Philip Milanov; Belgium	64.73; SB	Alin Firfirică; Romania	62.50
Hammer	Bence Halász; Hungary	75.36	Eivind Henriksen; Norway	74.55	Hleb Dudarau; Belarus	73.58
Javelin	Edis Matusevičius; Lithuania	82.35	Pavel Mialeshka; Belarus	77.94	Norbert Rivasz-Tóth; Hungary	77.04
WR world record | AR area record | CR championship record | GR games record | NR national record | OR Olympic record | PB personal best | SB season best | WL world leading (in a given season)

=== Women's events ===
Event	First		Second		Third	
100 m	Marije van Hunenstijn; Netherlands	11.63	Lorène Bazolo; Portugal	11.75	Ciara Neville; Ireland	11.82
200 m	Lorène Bazolo; Portugal	23.78	Krystsina Tsimanouskaya; Belarus	23.81	Imke Vervaet; Belgium	23.90
400 m	Lisanne de Witte; Netherlands	52.05	Modesta Morauskaitė; Lithuania	52.43	Cátia Azevedo; Portugal	52.44
800 m	Hedda Hynne; Norway	2:04.94	Renée Eykens; Belgium	2:05.24	Claudia Bobocea; Romania	2:05.60
1500 m	Daryia Barysevich; Belarus	4:50.60	Claudia Bobocea; Romania	4:51.05	Britt Ummels; Netherlands	4:51.40
3000 m	Karoline Bjerkeli Grøvdal; Norway	9:45.20	Maureen Koster; Netherlands	9:46.29	Mariana Machado; Portugal	9:49.98
5000 m	Roxana Bârcă; Romania	15:59.66; SB	Mariana Machado; Portugal	16:01.14; EU20L	Fionnuala McCormack; Ireland	16:02.78
3000 m steeplechase	Viktória Gyürkés; Hungary	9:53.48	Irene van der Reijken; Netherlands	9:56.35	Claudia Prisecaru; Romania	9:56.52
100 m hurdles	Nadine Visser; Netherlands	12.98	Elvira Herman; Belarus	13.15	Luca Kozák; Hungary	13.20
400 m hurdles	Amalie Iuel; Norway	55.80	Femke Bol; Netherlands	56.97	Paulien Couckuyt; Belgium	56.99
4 × 100 m	Belgium; Élise Mehuys; Rani Rosius; Imke Vervaet; Manon Depuydt	44.53; SB	Hungary; Anasztázia Nguyen; Klaudia Sorok; Éva Kaptur; Luca Kozák	44.73; SB	Portugal; Sofia Duarte; Lorène Bazolo; Olimpia Barbosa; Catarina Lourenco	44.94; SB
4 × 400 m	Norway; Sara Dorthea Jensen; Elisabeth Slettum; Line Kloster; Amalie Iuel	3:33.69	Portugal; Rivinilda Mentai; Vera Barbosa; Dorothé Évora; Cátia Azevedo	3:33.95; SB	Netherlands; Laura de Witte; Lieke Klaver; Bianca Baak; Maureen Ellsworth	3:33.97
High jump	Karina Taranda; Belarus	1.92	Claire Orcel; Belgium	1.90	Tonje Angelsen; Norway	1.85
Pole vault	Iryna Zhuk; Belarus	4.56	Lene Retzius; Norway	4.51; NR	Killiana Heymans; Netherlands	4.46
Long jump	Nastassia Mironchyk-Ivanova; Belarus	6.76	Evelise Veiga; Portugal	6.61	Alina Rotaru; Romania	6.59
Triple jump	Dovilė Dzindzaletaitė; Lithuania	14.28; PB	Elena Panțuroiu; Romania	14.24	Evelise Veiga; Portugal	13.94
Shot put	Aliona Dubitskaya; Belarus	18.78	Emel Dereli; Turkey	18.11; SB	Anita Márton; Hungary	17.66
Discus	Irina Rodrigues; Portugal	58.16	Corinne Nugter; Netherlands	57.10	Ieva Zarankaitė; Lithuania	55.08
Hammer	Martina Hrašnová; Slovakia	71.64	Kıvılcım Kaya; Turkey	68.63	Bianca Perie-Ghelber; Romania	68.43
Javelin	Tatsiana Khaladovich; Belarus	61.17	Réka Szilágyi; Hungary	57.97	Eda Tuğsuz; Turkey	54.92
WR world record | AR area record | CR championship record | GR games record | NR national record | OR Olympic record | PB personal best | SB season best | WL world leading (in a given season)

=== Score table ===
Event		BLR	BEL	HUN	IRL	LTU	NED	NOR	POR	ROU	SVK	TUR
100 metres	M	7	2	1	6	3	10	8	11	5	9	4
100 metres	W	1	5	2	9	3	11	7	10	8	4	6
200 metres	M	1	9	6	8	4	11	5	7	2	10	3
200 metres	W	10	9	2	4.5	3	4.5	8	11	7	6	1
400 metres	M	7	11	1	10	3	8	6	9	2	5	4
400 metres	W	2	6	4	5	10	11	1	9	8	7	3
800 metres	M	2	5	11	10	8	6	4	7	3	1	9
800 metres	W	6	10	2	5	8	3	11	4	9	7	1
1500 metres	M	3	7	4	8	9	6	11	10	2	1	5
1500 metres	W	11	1	6	5	3	9	4	8	10	2	7
3000 metres	M	7	11	3	5	8	9	10	6	2	1	4
3000 metres	W	8	4	3	6	1	10	11	9	7	5	2
5000 metres	M	3	4	2	6	1	5	11	8	9	7	10
5000 metres	W	5	8	1	9	3	6	4	10	11	2	7
3000 metre steeplechase	M	6	4	5	8	9	3	11	10	2	1	7
3000 metre steeplechase	W	5	4	11	6	1	10	3	8	9	2	7
110/100 metre hurdles	M	11	10	9	4	3	2	8	5	6	1	7
110/100 metre hurdles	W	10	5	9	4	1	11	8	6	2	7	3
400 metre hurdles	M	3	9	6	8	1	10	5	4	2	7	11
400 metre hurdles	W	4	9	7	3	1	10	11	8	2	6	5
4 × 100 metres relay	M	8	9	5	7	4	0	2	10	6	3	11
4 × 100 metres relay	W	7	11	10	8	0	0	0	9	5	4	6
4 × 400 metres relay	M	5	8	6	9	1	10	3	4	7	2	11
4 × 400 metres relay	W	4	2	6	8	3	9	11	10	7	5	1
High jump	M	10	6	5	2	7	8	1	4	3	9	11
High jump	W	11	10	4	8	1.5	1.5	9	7	5.5	5.5	3
Pole vault	M	6	10	5	3.5	2	7	11	8	1	3.5	9
Pole vault	W	11	8	5	4	1	9	10	6	2	3	7
Long jump	M	10	6	7	3	2	1	9	8	5	11	4
Long jump	W	11	7	8	2	1	3	6	10	9	4	5
Triple jump	M	7	2	5	3	6	1	4	11	10	9	8
Triple jump	W	8	1	2	4	11	3	6	9	10	5	7
Shot put	M	10	3	1	6	4	11	9	8	7	2	5
Shot put	W	11	3	9	4	6	8	2	7	5	1	10
Discus throw	M	7	10	6	5	8	3	11	2	9	1	4
Discus throw	W	7	1	6	5	9	10	4	11	3	2	8
Hammer throw	M	9	2	11	5	3	1	10	6	4	7	8
Hammer throw	W	6	0	8	3	2	5	7	4	9	11	10
Javelin throw	M	10	8	9	3	11	6	1	4	7	5	2
Javelin throw	W	11	1	10	5	8	7	6	4	3	2	9
Country		BLR	BEL	HUN	IRL	LTU	NED	NOR	POR	ROU	SVK	TUR
Total		281	241	223	227	173.5	259	269	302	225.5	186	245

=== Final standings ===
Pos	Country	Pts	Note
1	Portugal	302	Promoted to 2021 Super League
2	Belarus*	281	Initially hosts for 2020-2021 Super League before changing to Poland
3	Norway	269	
4	Netherlands	259	
5	Belgium	241	
6	Turkey	234	
7	Ireland	227	
8	Romania	225.5	Initially relegated, then hosts the 2021 First League
9	Hungary	223	Relegation to the 2021 Second League
10	Slovakia	186	Relegation to the 2021 Second League
11	Lithuania	173.5	Relegation to the 2021 Second League
DQ	Russia*	0	Relegation to the 2021 Second League

=== Notes ===
- As Russia were unable to take part due to their continuing suspension by the IAAF for systematic doping violations, the Russian team was automatically disqualified, and thus relegated.
- As the city of Minsk, Belarus, has initially been chosen to host the 2021 Super League by European Athletics, their team should have been automatically promoted to that division following this competition.

== Second League ==
=== Participating countries ===
- Austria
- Bulgaria (relegated)
- Croatia
- Cyprus
- Denmark (relegated)
- Estonia (relegated)
- Georgia (promoted)
- Israel
- Latvia
- Luxembourg (promoted)
- Malta (promoted)
- Slovenia

=== Men's events ===
Event	First		Second		Third	
100 m	Markus Fuchs; Austria	10.64	Imri Persiado; Israel	10.73	Milan Trajkovic; Cyprus	10.78
200 m	Markus Fuchs; Austria	21.00	Tazana Kamanga-Dyrbak; Denmark	21.16 =NU18B	Luka Janežič; Slovenia	21.28; SB
400 m	Luka Janežič; Slovenia	46.13	Jānis Leitis; Latvia	46.23 =SB	Donald Sanford; Israel	46.35; SB
800 m	Andreas Bube; Denmark	1:48.59	Žan Rudolf; Slovenia	1:49.01	Sven Cepuš; Croatia	1:49.60
1500 m	Nick Jensen; Denmark	3:54.97	Necho Tayachew; Israel	3:55.30	Kaur Kivistik; Estonia	3:55.35
3000 m	Dino Bošnjak; Croatia	8:01.29; SB	Mikkel Dahl-Jessen; Denmark	8:03.95; PB	Ivo Balabanov; Bulgaria	8:10.79
5000 m	Andreas Vojta; Austria	14:28.01	Tiidrek Nurme; Estonia	14:28.53; SB	Tadesse Getahon; Israel	14:29.90
3000 m steeplechase	Kaur Kivistik; Estonia	8:40.78	Mitko Tsenov; Bulgaria	8:47.66	Luca Sinn; Austria	8:55.48
110 m hurdles	Milan Trajkovic; Cyprus	13.73	Andreas Martinsen; Denmark	13.87	Stanislav Stankov; Bulgaria	14.41
400 m hurdles	Maksims Sinčukovs; Latvia	49.83; NU23R	Jaak-Heinrich Jagor; Estonia	49.92; SB	Nicolai Hartling; Denmark	50.01; NR
4 × 100 m	Austria; Maximilian Münzker; Markus Fuchs; Andreas Meyer; Samuel Reindl	39.88	Estonia; Hans-Christian Hausenberg; Karl Erik Nazarov; Ken-Mark Minkovski; Henri Sai	40.05; SB	Israel; Asaf Malka; Imri Persiado; Omri Sadan; Dor Kollwitz	40.21; SB
4 × 400 m	Slovenia; Jure Grkman; Rok Ferlan; Lovro Mesec Košir; Luka Janežič	3:06.80; SB	Latvia; Maksims Sinčukovs; Ilja Petrušenko; Austris Karpinskis; Jānis Leitis	3:07.73; SB	Estonia; Karl Erik Nazarov; Rivar Tipp; Jaak-Heinrich Jagor; Erik Jagor	3:08.95; SB
High jump	Tihomir Ivanov; Bulgaria	2.24	Karl Lumi; Estonia	2.21; SB	Kyriakos Ioannou; Cyprus	2.10 =SB
Pole vault	Mareks Ārents; Latvia	5.50	Nikandros Stylianou; Cyprus	5.50; SB	Robin Nool; Estonia	5.20
Long jump	Elvijs Misāns; Latvia	7.78; SB	Sanjin Šimić; Croatia	7.63	Hans-Christian Hausenberg; Estonia	7.50
Triple jump	Lasha Gulelauri; Georgia	16.44	Tom Ya'acobov; Israel	16.39; SB	Momchil Karailiev; Bulgaria	16.16
Shot put	Bob Bertemes; Luxembourg	21.62; NR	Filip Mihaljević; Croatia	21.03	Kristo Galeta; Estonia	19.57
Discus	Lukas Weißhaidinger; Austria	63.99	Martin Kupper; Estonia	63.51	Apostolos Parellis; Cyprus	62.48
Hammer	Alexandros Poursanidis; Cyprus	71.06; SB	Nejc Pleško; Slovenia	70.49	Adam Kelly; Estonia	65.27
Javelin	Magnus Kirt; Estonia	81.47	Gatis Čakšs; Latvia	77.23	Mark Slavov; Bulgaria	74.14; SB
WR world record | AR area record | CR championship record | GR games record | NR national record | OR Olympic record | PB personal best | SB season best | WL world leading (in a given season)

=== Women's events ===
Event	First		Second		Third	
100 m	Ivet Lalova-Collio; Bulgaria	11.51	Maja Mihalinec; Slovenia	11.56	Diana Vaisman; Israel	11.64
200 m	Ivet Lalova-Collio; Bulgaria	22.99	Maja Mihalinec; Slovenia	23.03; SB	Gunta Latiševa-Čudare; Latvia	23.51
400 m	Eleni Artymata; Cyprus	51.93	Anita Horvat; Slovenia	52.45	Gunta Latiševa-Čudare; Latvia	53.58
800 m	Līga Velvere; Latvia	2:03.45	Jerneja Smonkar; Slovenia	2:04.66; PB	Shanie Landen; Israel	2:06.67; SB
1500 m	Anna Emilie Møller; Denmark	4:18.59	Vera Hoffmann; Luxembourg	4:19.25	Adva Cohen; Israel	4:20.96; SB
3000 m	Anna Emilie Møller; Denmark	9:12.59	Militsa Mircheva; Bulgaria	9:20.50	Liina Tšernov; Estonia	9:22.17; SB
5000 m	Lonah Chemtai Salpeter; Israel	15:44.38	Matea Parlov; Croatia	16:03.71; PB	Julia Mayer; Austria	16:07.96; PB
3000 m steeplechase	Adva Cohen; Israel	10:21.07	Klara Lukan; Slovenia	10:33.55	Lena Millonig; Austria	10:45.11
100 m hurdles	Beate Schrott; Austria	13.36	Ivana Lončarek; Croatia	13.53	Thea Håhr; Denmark	13.56
400 m hurdles	Sara Petersen; Denmark	55.76	Agata Zupin; Slovenia	58.36	Ida Šimunčić; Croatia	58.66; SB
4 × 100 m	Cyprus; Olivia Fotopoulou; Ramona Papaioannou; Filippa Fotopoulou; Eleni Artymata	44.15; SB	Estonia; Õilme Võro; Kreete Verlin; Karoli Käärt; Ksenija Balta	44.71; NR	Israel; Gal Kadmon; Diana Vaisman; Olga Lenskay Yarko; Ilana Dorfman	44.85; NR
4 × 400 m	Slovenia; Agata Zupin; Jerneja Smonkar; Aneja Simončič; Anita Horvat	3:36.71; SB	Estonia; Helin Meier; Annika Sakkarias; Marielle Kleemeier; Liis Roose	3:40.18	Croatia; Ida Šimunčić; Alena Hrušoci; Veronika Drljačić; Kristina Dudek	3:40.82; SB
High jump	Mirela Demireva; Bulgaria	1.94	Ana Šimić; Croatia	1.94 =SB	Maruša Černjul; Slovenia	1.90
Pole vault	Tina Šutej; Slovenia	4.70; NR	Caroline Bonde Holm; Denmark	4.05	Ildze Bortašcenoka; Latvia	3.95
Long jump	Ksenija Balta; Estonia	6.52	Nektaria Panagi; Cyprus	6.32	Neja Filipič; Slovenia	6.12
Triple jump	Gabriela Petrova; Bulgaria	14.14	Janne Nielsen; Denmark	13.61	Merilyn Uudmäe; Estonia	13.56
Shot put	Radoslava Mavrodieva; Bulgaria	17.34	Marija Tolj; Croatia	15.73; PB	Maria Sløk Hansen; Denmark	14.92
Discus	Sandra Perković; Croatia	68.58; CR	Kätlin Tõllasson; Estonia	55.73	Kathrine Bebe; Denmark	54.58
Hammer	Laura Igaune; Latvia	66.82	Barbara Špiler; Slovenia	64.85	Anamari Kožul; Croatia	64.79
Javelin	Sara Kolak; Croatia	57.97	Martina Ratej; Slovenia	56.87	Gundega Grīva; Latvia	51.41
WR world record | AR area record | CR championship record | GR games record | NR national record | OR Olympic record | PB personal best | SB season best | WL world leading (in a given season)

=== Score table ===
Event		AUT	BUL	CRO	CYP	DEN	EST	GEO	ISR	LAT	LUX	MLT	SLO
100 metres	M	12	9	8	10	7	5	1	11	3	6	2	4
100 metres	W	6	12	3	9	5	2	1	10	8	7	4	11
200 metres	M	12	9	2	6	11	7	1	8	5	4	3	10
200 metres	W	8	12	3	1	9	7	2	10	5	4	6	11
400 metres	M	8	4	9	2	5	6	7	10	11	3	1	12
400 metres	W	9	5	8	12	4	6	1	3	10	2	7	11
800 metres	M	5	4	10	6	12	3	2	8	9	7	1	11
800 metres	W	4	2	7	8	5	6	1	10	12	9	3	11
1500 metres	M	4	8	5	3	12	10	1	11	6	7	2	9
1500 metres	W	2	6	7	8	12	5	1	10	9	11	3	4
3000 metres	M	8	10	12	2	11	6	3	7	9	5	1	4
3000 metres	W	8	11	4	6	12	10	9	2	5	3	1	7
5000 metres	M	12	9	5	4	6	11	2	10	8	3	1	7
5000 metres	W	10	5	11	6	9	1	8	12	7	2	3	4
3000 metre steeplechase	M	10	11	9	4	6	12	8	7	5	2	3	1
3000 metre steeplechase	W	10	3	5	9	6	7	1	12	2	4	8	11
110/100 metre hurdles	M	3	10	6	12	11	9	2	5	7	4	1	8
110/100 metre hurdles	W	12	9	11	0	10	7	4	0	6	5	3	8
400 metre hurdles	M	9	5	6	4	10	11	1	7	12	2	3	8
400 metre hurdles	W	5	9	10	4	12	8	1	7	6	3	2	11
4 × 100 metres relay	M	12	7	5	6	9	11	0	10	4	3	2	8
4 × 100 metres relay	W	9	6	4	12	8	11	1	10	5	2	3	7
4 × 400 metres relay	M	0	3	8	7	9	10	4	0	11	6	5	12
4 × 400 metres relay	W	7	9	10	5	6	11	1	4	8	2	3	12
High jump	M	7.5	12	6	10	2	11	3	7.5	9	4	0	5
High jump	W	8.5	12	11	7	6	8.5	2	5	4	3	0	10
Pole vault	M	5	6	9	11	7	10	3	8	12	4	0	0
Pole vault	W	0	4	5	7	11	8	3	9	10	6	0	12
Long jump	M	2	1	11	7	9	10	8	3	12	5	6	4
Long jump	W	5	9	2	11	7	12	1	4	8	3	6	10
Triple jump	M	8	10	6	5	3	7	12	11	9	2	1	4
Triple jump	W	5	12	7	1	11	10	6	4	8	2	3	9
Shot put	M	2	7	11	4	6	10	9	8	3	12	1	5
Shot put	W	6	12	11	2	10	8	7	4	5	9	1	3
Discus throw	M	12	6	9	10	7	11	3	4	2	5	1	8
Discus throw	W	4	5	12	9	10	11	2	6	8	3	1	7
Hammer throw	M	6	7	8	12	4	10	9	3	5	1	2	11
Hammer throw	W	7	2	10	8	4	9	5	6	12	3	1	11
Javelin throw	M	4	10	8	6	7	12	2	5	11	3	1	9
Javelin throw	W	8	5	12	4	2	7	3	6	10	9	1	11
Country		AUT	BUL	CRO	CYP	DEN	EST	GEO	ISR	LAT	LUX	MLT	SLO
Total		275	298	306	260	313	336.5	141	272.5	306	180	96	321

=== Final standings ===
Pos	Country	Pts	Note
1	Estonia	336.5	Promoted to 2021 First League
2	Slovenia	321	
3	Denmark	313	
4	Latvia	306	
5	Croatia	306	
6	Bulgaria	298	
7	Austria	275	
8	Israel	272.5	Relegation to the 2021 Third League
9	Cyprus	260	Relegation to the 2021 Third League
10	Luxembourg	180	Relegation to the 2021 Third League
11	Georgia	141	Relegation to the 2021 Third League
12	Malta	96	Relegation to the 2021 Third League

== Third League ==
=== Participating countries ===
- AASSE (Gibraltar, Monaco & Liechtenstein)
- Albania*
- Andorra
- Armenia
- Azerbaijan
- Bosnia and Herzegovina
- Iceland (relegated)
- Kosovo*
- Montenegro
- North Macedonia
- Moldova (relegated)
- San Marino
- Serbia (relegated)

(*) Did not compete in 2017.

=== Men's events ===
Event	First		Second		Third	
100 m	Jovan Stojoski (MKD)	10.72 PB	Hajrudin Vejzović (BIH)	10.77 PB	Aleksa Kijanović (SRB)	10.79
200 m	Jovan Stojoski (MKD)	21.35	Kolbeinn Höður Gunnarsson (ISL)	21.53	Aleksa Kijanović (SRB)	21.90 SB
400 m	Franko Burraj (ALB)	46.48 NR	Boško Kijanović (SRB)	46.70	Jovan Stojoski (MKD)	46.94 NU23R
800 m	Abedin Mujezinović (BIH)	1:47.64	Musa Hajdari (KOS)	1:48.19 SB	Pol Moya (AND)	1:48.58
1500 m	Elzan Bibić (SRB)	3:47.79	Hlynur Andrésson (ISL)	3:49.29 SB	Yervand Mkrtchyan (ARM)	3:50.47 SB
3000 m	Elzan Bibić (SRB)	8:04.74	Hlynur Andrésson (ISL)	8:15.18 PB	Dario Ivanovski (MKD)	8:20.28 SB
5000 m	Miloš Malešević (SRB)	14:47.05 PB	Osman Junuzović (BIH)	14:49.76 PB	Maxim Răileanu (MDA)	15:02.07 SB
3000 m steeplechase	Nicolai Gorbușco (MDA)	8:58.84 SB	Yervand Mkrtchyan (ARM)	8:59.15 SB	Osman Junuzović (BIH)	9:03.64 SB
110 m hurdles	Luka Trgovčević (SRB)	14.29	Rahib Məmmədov (AZE)	14.50	Alexandr Crușelnițchi (MDA)	14.64 SB
400 m hurdles	Rusmir Malkočević (BIH)	51.84	Ívar Kristinn Jasonarson (ISL)	52.56	Andrea Ercolani Volta (SMR)	52.65 SB
4 × 100 m	Iceland; Juan Ramón Borges Bosque; Jóhann Björn Sigurbjörnsson; Kolbeinn Höður Gunnarsson; Ari Bragi Kárason	40.44 SB	Serbia; Boško Kijanović; Miloš Grujić; Nemanja Bulajić; Aleksa Kijanović	41.19 SB	Moldova; Alexandru Zatic; Andrei Șturmilov; Cristin Eșanu; Alexandr Crușelnițchi	42.16 SB
4 × 400 m	Bosnia and Herzegovina; Arman Curo; Rusmir Malkočević; Stefan Ćuković; Abedin Mujezinović	3:13.61 SB	Iceland; Kolbeinn Höður Gunnarsson; Kormákur Ari Haflidason; Hinrik Snær Steinsson; Ívar Kristinn Jasonarson	3:14.38 SB	Moldova; Denis Cernei; Ivan Siuris; Cristin Eșanu; Andrei Șturmilov	3:17.04 SB
High jump	Jasmin Halili (SRB)	2.10	Matteo Mosconi (SMR)	2.05	Maid Redžić (BIH)	2.00
Pole vault	Miloš Savić (SRB)	4.81	Miquel Vílchez (AND)	4.61 SB	Benjamín Jóhann Johnsen (ISL)	4.51 PB
Long jump	Strahinja Jovančević (SRB)	7.39	Artak Hambardzumyan (ARM)	7.24 SB	Vadim Doscalov (MDA)	7.12 PB
Triple jump	Levon Aghasyan (ARM)	16.46	Rüstəm Məmmədov (AZE)	15.97	Vadim Doscalov (MDA)	15.46 PB
Shot put	Asmir Kolašinac (SRB)	20.01	Tomaš Đurović (MNE)	19.45 SB	Kemal Mešić (BIH)	19.43
Discus	Danijel Furtula (MNE)	60.32	Ștefan Mura (MDA)	51.99	Valdimar Hjalti Erlendsson (ISL)	51.20
Hammer	Serghei Marghiev (MDA)	73.54	Hilmar Örn Jónsson (ISL)	72.43	Samir Vilić (BIH)	54.06
Javelin	Dejan Mileusnić (BIH)	76.86	Vedran Samac (SRB)	76.68	Dagbjartur Daði Jónsson (ISL)	74.18
WR world record | AR area record | CR championship record | GR games record | NR national record | OR Olympic record | PB personal best | SB season best | WL world leading (in a given season)

=== Women's events ===
Event	First		Second		Third	
100 m	Milana Tirnanić (SRB)	11.50 PB	Guðbjörg Jóna Bjarnadóttir (ISL)	11.58	Zəkiyyə Həsənova (AZE)	11.94
200 m	Guðbjörg Jóna Bjarnadóttir (ISL)	23.74	Maja Ćirić (SRB)	23.82	Zəkiyyə Həsənova (AZE)	24.52
400 m	Maja Ćirić (SRB)	53.32	Þórdís Eva Steinsdóttir (ISL)	56.23 SB	Drita Islami (MKD)	56.72
800 m	Jelena Gajić (BIH)	2:05.82 PB	Aníta Hinriksdóttir (ISL)	2:06.16 SB	Marija Stambolić (SRB)	2:06.22 PB
1500 m	Teodora Simović (SRB)	4:32.33	Aníta Hinriksdóttir (ISL)	4:36.33	Gresa Bakraçi (KOS)	4:42.26 PB
3000 m	Teodora Simović (SRB)	9:23.86 PB	Lilia Fisikovici (MDA)	9:26.77 SB	Andrea Kolbeinsdóttir (ISL)	9:47.66 SB
5000 m	Luiza Gega (ALB)	15:36.62 NR	Lilia Fisikovici (MDA)	16:13.24 PB	Olivera Jevtić (SRB)	17:14.66 SB
3000 m steeplechase	Luiza Gega (ALB)	9:25.80 SB	Ellada Alaverdyan (ARM)	11:08.01 NR	Nevena Jovanović (SRB)	11:15.48
100 m hurdles	Anja Lukić (SRB)	13.83	María Rún Gunnlaugsdóttir (ISL)	14.21 PB	Mladena Petrušic (BIH)	14.37 PB
400 m hurdles	Drita Islami (MKD)	1:00.81	Iana Garaeva (MDA)	1:04.35	Beatrice Berti (SMR)	1:06.35
4 × 100 m	Iceland; Andrea Torfadóttir; Dóróthea Jóhannesdóttir; Agnes Kristjánsdóttir; Guðbjörg Jóna Bjarnadóttir	45.81	Serbia; Anja Lukić; Zorana Barjaktarović; Katarina Sirmić; Milana Tirnanić	45.83 SB	Azerbaijan; Fakhriyya Taghizade; Yelena Pekhtireva; Lamiya Valiyeva; Zəkiyyə Həsənova	46.92 SB
4 × 400 m	Serbia; Katarina Ilić; Bojana Kaličanin; Zorana Barjaktarović; Tamara Salaški	3:43.50 SB	Iceland; Glódís Edda Þuríðardóttir; Gudbjörg Jóna Bjarnadóttir; Agnes Kristjánsdóttir; Þórdís Eva Steinsdóttir	3:45.47 SB	Bosnia and Herzegovina; Aleksandra Roljić; Alisa Bečič; Adela Čomor; Jelena Gajić	3:59.21 SB
High jump	Marija Vuković (MNE)	1.84	Mladena Petrušić (BIH)	1.80 PB	María Rún Gunnlaugsdóttir (ISL)	1.75 PB
Pole vault	Hulda Þorsteinsdóttir (ISL)	3.60	Eleonora Rossi (SMR)	3.26 SB	Valentina Slović (SRB)	3.11 PB
Long jump	Milica Gardašević (SRB)	6.28	Ljiljana Matović (MNE)	5.83	Birna Kristín Kristjánsdóttir (ISL)	5.73
Triple jump	Iuliana Dabija (MDA)	12.90	Sabrina Zralova (AZE)	12.90 PB	Marija Stojadinović (SRB)	12.86 NU23R
Shot put	Dimitriana Surdu (MDA)	16.46	Erna Sóley Gunnarsdóttir (ISL)	15.85	Kristina Rakočević (MNE)	14.88
Discus	Dragana Tomašević (SRB)	59.19	Kristina Rakočević (MNE)	52.88	Dimitriana Surdu (MDA)	50.77
Hammer	Zalina Petrivskaya (MDA)	71.85	Anna Skidan (AZE)	69.19	Vigdís Jónsdóttir (ISL)	61.52 SB
Javelin	Ásdís Hjálmsdóttir (ISL)	57.04	Marija Vučenović (SRB)	56.71	Vanja Spaić (BIH)	42.92
WR world record | AR area record | CR championship record | GR games record | NR national record | OR Olympic record | PB personal best | SB season best | WL world leading (in a given season)

=== Score table ===
Event		AAS	ALB	AND	ARM	AZE	BIH	ISL	KOS	MKD	MDA	MNE	SMR	SRB
100 metres	M	2	5	6	3	0	12	10	7	13	8	4	9	11
100 metres	W	1	2	3.5	9	11	6	12	7	5	10	8	3.5	13
200 metres	M	4	5	1	2	7	9	12	6	13	10	3	8	11
200 metres	W	4	7	6	9	11	8	13	5	10	0	2	3	12
400 metres	M	1	13	4	3	8	10	7	6	11	9	2	5	12
400 metres	W	3	6	1	10	8	9	12	2	11	7	4	5	13
800 metres	M	2	10	11	6	0	13	9	12	4	7	5	3	8
800 metres	W	8	6	0	9	0	13	12	10	3	7	5	4	11
1500 metres	M	10	4	7	11	0	9	12	5	8	6	3	2	13
1500 metres	W	9	0	0	10	0	0	12	11	7	8	6	5	13
3000 metres	M	3	0	6	8	0	9	12	7	11	10	5	4	13
3000 metres	W	0	0	0	8	0	9	11	6	7	12	10	5	13
5000 metres	M	4	0	0	9	0	12	10	8	7	11	6	5	13
5000 metres	W	0	13	0	5	0	7	10	6	8	12	9	4	11
3000 metre steeplechase	M	7	6	10	12	0	11	9	0	4	13	5	3	8
3000 metre steeplechase	W	0	13	0	12	0	10	7	0	6	8	9	5	11
110/100 metre hurdles	M	0	6	0	5	12	9	10	0	7	11	4	8	13
110/100 metre hurdles	W	0	9	5	6	0	11	12	0	8	10	7	4	13
400 metre hurdles	M	0	6	5	9	0	13	12	0	4	8	7	11	10
400 metre hurdles	W	0	0	8	7	0	6	9	0	13	12	10	11	0
4 × 100 metres relay	M	8	6	7	0	0	10	13	0	9	11	5	4	12
4 × 100 metres relay	W	0	7	3	10	11	9	13	5	6	8	4	2	12
4 × 400 metres relay	M	6	0	7	5	0	13	12	10	0	11	9	8	0
4 × 400 metres relay	W	0	9	0	7	0	11	12	10	8	0	6	5	13
High jump	M	0	6.5	0	0	0	11	8	6.5	9.5	9.5	5	12	13
High jump	W	0	0	0	0	0	12	11	0	7.5	7.5	13	9	10
Pole vault	M	0	0	12	0	0	7	11	0	0	9	10	8	13
Pole vault	W	0	0	0	0	0	0	13	9	0	10	0	12	11
Long jump	M	0	0	3	12	10	9	8	6	4	11	7	5	13
Long jump	W	0	2	3	8	10	9	11	4	6	7	12	5	13
Triple jump	M	0	8	0	13	12	9	7	5	3	11	6	4	10
Triple jump	W	0	3	0	10	12	7	8	4	5	13	9	6	11
Shot put	M	0	0	0	9	0	11	10	7	6	8	12	5	13
Shot put	W	0	4	0	8	0	10	12	7	6	13	11	5	9
Discus throw	M	0	4	0	7	9	10	11	6	8	12	13	3	5
Discus throw	W	0	0	0	7	8	9	10	0	6	11	12	5	13
Hammer throw	M	0	0	0	9	0	11	12	0	8	13	10	7	0
Hammer throw	W	0	6	0	9	12	8	11	0	4	13	7	5	10
Javelin throw	M	0	6	0	0	8	13	11	5	7	10	9	4	12
Javelin throw	W	0	0	0	6	0	11	13	8	0	10	9	7	12
Country		AAS	ALB	AND	ARM	AZE	BIH	ISL	KOS	MKD	MDA	MNE	SMR	SRB
Total		72	172.5	108.5	273	149	385	430	181.5	263	377	283	228.5	427

=== Final standings ===
Pos	Country	Pts	Note
1	Iceland	430	Promoted to 2021 Second League
2	Serbia	427	
3	Bosnia and Herzegovina	385	
4	Moldova	377	
5	Montenegro	283	
6	Armenia	273	
7	North Macedonia	263	
8	San Marino	228.5	
9	Kosovo	181.5	
10	Albania	172.5	
11	Azerbaijan	149	
12	Andorra	108.5	
13	AASSE	72	
