= 2021 European Athletics Team Championships =

European athletics competition

- Host city: Chorzów, Poland (Super League); Cluj-Napoca, Romania (First League); Stara Zagora, Bulgaria (Second League); Limassol, Cyprus (Third League)
- Events: 40
- Dates: 29–30 May 2021 (Super League); 19–20 June 2021 (other leagues)

The 2021 European Athletics Team Championships was held in four cities, on 29–30 May (Super League) and on 19–20 June 2021. For the first time, the ETC was not held on the same weekend for all leagues. At the European Athletics Team Championships medals are not awarded in individual events.

== Grouping and host cities ==
League	Date	Stadium	City	Nation
Super League	29–30 May 2021	Silesian Stadium	Chorzów	Poland
First League	19–20 June 2021	Cluj Arena	Cluj-Napoca	Romania
Second League	19–20 June 2021	Stadion Beroe	Stara Zagora	Bulgaria
Third League	19–20 June 2021	Tsirio Stadium	Limassol	Cyprus

It had been decided in 2018 that, starting in 2021, a new system would be introduced for grouping teams in the ETC. This would aim to have 8 teams in the Super League (plus the host country if it had not already qualified), 12 teams in the First and Second Leagues, and all the remaining teams in the Third League. The city of Minsk, Belarus, initially designated as the Super League venue, was replaced by Chorzów in November 2020 due to the political situation in Belarus.

== Super League ==
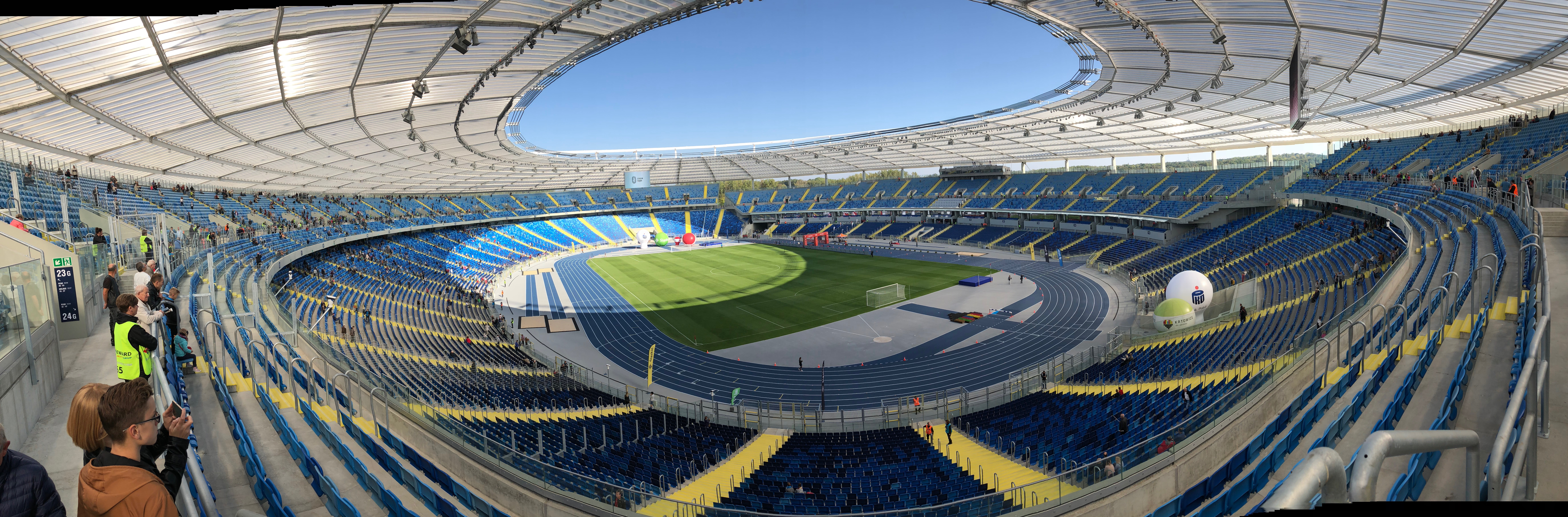

The 2021 Super League consisted of only 8 teams, down from 12 in previous editions.

On 24 May, Ukraine withdrew due to the COVID-19 pandemic, and the EAA ruled Ukraine would be relegated to First division in 2023.

The event was held over two days, attracting a total of 7,600 spectators (there was no entry fee for either day).

=== Participating countries ===
- France
- Germany
- Great Britain
- Italy
- Poland
- Portugal
- Spain
- Ukraine

=== Final entries ===
406 athletes (206 men, 200 women) from 7 (8 scheduled) countries. All 54 athletes from Ukraine ended up not participating in the Championships. Some candidates for top spots, such as Marcell Jacobs, Gianmarco Tamberi, Marcin Lewandowski, Piotr Lisek, and Jessie Knight, were registered to compete but also chose to withdraw later.

=== Men's events ===
Event	First		Second		Third	
100 m (wind: -0.5 m/s)	Mouhamadou Fall; France	10.28	Lorenzo Patta; Italy	10.29	Lucas Ansah-Peprah; Germany	10.35
200 m (wind: -1.0 m/s)	Fausto Desalu; Italy	20.48	Jesús Gómez; Spain	20.87 =PB	Owen Ansah; Germany	20.96
400 m	Thomas Jordier; France	45.65; SB	Cameron Chalmers; Great Britain	45.89; SB	Davide Re; Italy	45.90
800 m	Jake Wightman; Great Britain	1:45.71	Mariano García; Spain	1:46.45	Mateusz Borkowski; Poland	1:46.66
1500 m	Robert Farken; Germany	3:56.64	Jesús Gómez; Spain	3:56.79	Michał Rozmys; Poland	3:57.13
3000 m	Isaac Nader; Portugal	8:31.26	Yann Schrub; France	8:31.82	Adel Mechaal; Spain	8:32.08
5000 m	Yemaneberhan Crippa; Italy	13:17.23; CR	Hugo Hay; France	13:17.95; PB	Carlos Mayo; Spain	13:18.15; PB
110 m hurdles (wind: -0.3 m/s)	Asier Martínez; Spain	13.43	David King; Great Britain	13.63	Damian Czykier; Poland	13.65
400 m hurdles	Alessandro Sibilio; Italy	49.70	Alastair Chalmers; Great Britain	49.95; SB	Ludvy Vaillant; France	50.76
3000 m steeplechase	Fernando Carro; Spain	8:39.67	Mehdi Belhadj; France	8:40.03	Osama Zoghlami; Italy	8:40.41
4×100 m relay	Germany Lucas Ansah-Peprah; Owen Ansah; Niels Torben Giese; Marvin Schulte	38.73	Spain Arnau Monné; Pol Retamal; Jesús Gómez; Sergio López	39.07; SB	France Marvin René; Ryan Zeze; Méba-Mickaël Zeze; Amaury Golitin	39.12
4×400 m relay	Italy Davide Re; Alessandro Sibilio; Edoardo Scotti; Vladimir Aceti	3:02.64; EL	Spain Samuel García; Lucas Búa; Manuel Guijarro; Bernat Erta	3:03.10; SB	Poland Wiktor Suwara; Kajetan Duszyński; Patryk Grzegorzewicz; Karol Zalewski	3:03.43; SB
High jump	Norbert Kobielski; Poland	2.24 =SB	William Grimsey; Great Britain	2.24	Falk Wendrich; Germany	2.20 =SB
Pole vault	Robert Sobera; Poland	5.65; SB	Harry Coppell; Great Britain	5.55; SB	Oleg Zernikel; Germany	5.55
Long jump	Filippo Randazzo; Italy	7.88 m (−0.5)	Fabian Heinle; Germany	7.82 m -0.8 SB	Augustin Bey; France	7.75 m −0.3
Long jump	Filippo Randazzo; Italy	7.88 m (−0.5)	Fabian Heinle; Germany	7.82 m -0.8 SB	Eusebio Cáceres; Spain	7.75 m −0.7
Triple jump	Max Heß; Germany	17.13; EL	Pedro Pichardo; Portugal	17.01 (EL)	Pablo Torrijos; Spain	16.93; SB
Shot put	Michał Haratyk; Poland	21.34	Leonardo Fabbri; Italy	20.77; SB	Scott Lincoln; Great Britain	20.00
Discus throw	Lawrence Okoye; Great Britain	64.22	Robert Urbanek; Poland	62.57	David Wrobel; Germany	61.52
Hammer throw	Paweł Fajdek; Poland	82.98; CR	Javier Cienfuegos; Spain	77.11; SB	Quentin Bigot; France	76.75
Javelin throw	Johannes Vetter; Germany	96.29; CR	Marcin Krukowski; Poland	85.12; SB	Odei Jainaga; Spain	84.80; NR

=== Women's events ===
Event	First		Second		Third	
100 m	Pia Skrzyszowska; Poland	11.25; EU23L	Lisa Mayer; Germany	11.27	Imani-Lara Lansiquot; Great Britain	11.27
200 m	Beth Dobbin; Great Britain	22.78; SB	Dalia Kaddari; Italy	22.89; EU23L	Rebekka Haase; Germany	23.00
400 m	Natalia Kaczmarek; Poland	51.36	Aauri Bokesa; Spain	52.22	Corinna Schwab; Germany	52.72
800 m	Ellie Baker; Great Britain	2:00.95	Elena Bellò; Italy	2:02.06; SB	Angelika Sarna; Poland	2:02.54; SB
1500 m	Gaia Sabbatini; Italy	4:14.87	Salomé Afonso; Portugal	4:15.08; SB	Marta Pérez; Spain	4:15.24
3000 m	Revee Walcott-Nolan; Great Britain	9:13.36; PB	Lucía Rodríguez; Spain	9:14.45; PB	Vera Coutellier; Germany	9:15.27
5000 m	Nadia Battocletti; Italy	15:46.95	Blanca Fernández; Spain	15:51.44	Denise Krebs; Germany	15:53.09; SB
100 m hurdles	Pia Skrzyszowska; Poland	12.99	Luminosa Bogliolo; Italy	13.05	Teresa Errandonea; Spain	13.24
400 m hurdles	Lina Nielsen; Great Britain	55.59	Carolina Krafzik; Germany	55.71; SB	Linda Olivieri; Italy	56.17; SB
3000 m steeplechase	Alicja Konieczek; Poland	9:35.63	Elena Burkard; Germany	9:36.04	Irene Sánchez-Escribano; Spain	9:41.44
4×100 m relay	United Kingdom Beth Dobbin; Imani-Lara Lansiquot; Bianca Williams; Desirèe Henry	43.36	Poland Marika Popowicz-Drapała; Klaudia Adamek; Katarzyna Sokólska; Marlena Gola	43.83	France Wided Atatou; Orlann Ombissa-Dzangue; Maroussia Paré; Eva Berger	43.91
4×400 m relay	Poland Małgorzata Hołub-Kowalik; Kornelia Lesiewicz; Justyna Święty-Ersetic; Natalia Kaczmarek	3:26.37; EL	United Kingdom Ama Pipi; Hannah Williams; Yasmin Liverpool; Lina Nielsen	3:27.16	Italy Alice Mangione; Eleonora Marchiando; Petra Nardelli; Raphaela Lukudo	3:29.05
High jump	Kamila Lićwinko; Poland	1.94 =SB	Alessia Trost; Italy	1.91; SB	Emily Borthwick; Great Britain	1.88
Pole vault	Roberta Bruni; Italy	4.45	Malen Ruiz de Azúa; Spain	4.35	Molly Caudery; Great Britain	4.35; SB
Long jump	Maryse Luzolo; Germany	6.61 =PB	Magdalena Żebrowska; Poland	6.55; PB	María Vicente; Spain	6.42
Triple jump	Rouguy Diallo; France	14.12	Naomi Ogbeta; Great Britain	14.01	Adrianna Szóstak; Poland	13.96; PB
Shot put	Sara Gambetta; Germany	18.75	Auriol Dongmo; Portugal	18.74	Klaudia Kardasz; Poland	18.17; SB
Discus throw	Liliana Cá; Portugal	61.36	Marike Steinacker; Germany	59.29	Kirsty Law; Great Britain	58.13
Hammer throw	Alexandra Tavernier; France	75.06	Malwina Kopron; Poland	73.18	Sara Fantini; Italy	70.31; SB
Javelin throw	Christin Hussong; Germany	69.19; CR	Jöna Aigouy; France	56.59	Freya Jones; Great Britain	54.68

=== Final standings ===
Pos	Country	Pts	Note
1st place, gold medalist(s)	Poland	181.5	
2nd place, silver medalist(s)	Italy	179	Did not start in men's high jump (received 0 points)
3rd place, bronze medalist(s)	Great Britain	174	
4	Germany	171	
5	Spain	167	
6	France	140	
7	Portugal	97.5	Should have been relegated to the 2023 First League, but finally only Ukraine is relegated to 2nd Division in 2023
–	Ukraine	withdrew	Should have been relegated to the 2023 First League, but finally only Ukraine is relegated to 2nd Division in 2023

Before the last event on Sunday, the Men's 4×400 m relay, three teams were still vying for the Championship: Poland with 176.5 points, Great Britain with 174 points, and Italy with 172 points. The Italian team lead the race after the first two legs, with Great Britain close behind. In the third leg, British runners failed to make the baton pass, while the Polish team finished strongly in the last leg to go from 5th to 3rd. As a result, Poland obtained enough points to win over Italy.

=== Score table ===
Event		FRA	GER	GBR	ITA	POL	POR	ESP
100 metres	M	7	5	3	6	4	2	1
100 metres	W	4	6	5	2	7	1	3
200 metres	M	3	5	4	7	2	1	6
200 metres	W	3	5	7	6	4	2	1
400 metres	M	7	3	6	5	1	2	4
400 metres	W	1	5	3	2	7	4	6
800 metres	M	2.5	2.5	7	4	5	1	6
800 metres	W	4	0	7	6	5	2	3
1500 metres	M	1	7	4	2	5	3	6
1500 metres	W	3	1	4	7	2	6	5
3000 metres	M	6	0	3	4	2	7	5
3000 metres	W	2	5	7	3	4	1	6
5000 metres	M	6	3	4	7	1	2	5
5000 metres	W	4	5	3	7	1	2	6
3000 metre steeplechase	M	6	3	2	5	4	1	7
3000 metre steeplechase	W	3	6	1	4	7	2	5
110 metre hurdles 100 metre hurdles	M	3	1	6	4	5	2	7
110 metre hurdles 100 metre hurdles	W	3	4	2	6	7	1	5
400 metre hurdles	M	5	4	6	7	2	1	3
400 metre hurdles	W	1	6	7	5	3	2	4
4×100 metres relay	M	5	7	2	3	4	1	6
4×100 metres relay	W	5	0	7	3	6	4	0
4×400 metres relay	M	4	3	0	7	5	2	6
4×400 metres relay	W	0	4	6	5	7	2	3
High jump	M	4	5	6	0	7	2.5	2.5
High jump	W	3	4	5	6	7	1	2
Pole vault	M	1	5	6	4	7	2	3
Pole vault	W	4	1.5	5	7	1.5	3	6
Long jump	M	4.5	6	3	7	2	1	4.5
Long jump	W	0	7	2	4	6	3	5
Triple jump	M	3	7	2	4	1	6	5
Triple jump	W	7	4	6	1	5	2	3
Shot put	M	1	4	5	6	7	2	3
Shot put	W	1	7	4	2	5	6	3
Discus throw	M	0	5	7	4	6	2	3
Discus throw	W	3	6	5	2	4	7	1
Hammer throw	M	5	2	4	3	7	1	6
Hammer throw	W	7	3	2	5	6	1	4
Javelin throw	M	2	7	1	4	6	3	5
Javelin throw	W	6	7	5	3	4	1	2
Country		FRA	GER	GBR	ITA	POL	POR	ESP
Total		140	171	174	179	181.5	97.5	167

=== Broken records ===
- Men's 5000 m CR Yemaneberhan Crippa (ITA) 13:17.23 on 29 May 2021
- Men's Javelin Throw WL CR Johannes Vetter (GER) 96.29 m on 29 May 2021
- Men's Hammer Throw WL CR Paweł Fajdek (POL) 82.98 m on 30 May 2021
- Men's Triple Jump EL Max Heß (GER) 17.13 m on 30 May 2021
- Men's 4×400 m Relay EL Italy Team with Davide Re, Alessandro Sibilio, Edoardo Scotti and Vladimir Aceti 3:02.64 on 30 May 2021
- Women's Javelin Throw CR Christin Hussong (GER) 69.19 m on 30 May 2021
- Women's 4×400 m Relay EL Poland Team with Małgorzata Hołub-Kowalik, Kornelia Lesiewicz, Justyna Święty-Ersetic and Natalia Kaczmarek 3:26.37 on 30 May 2021.

=== Medal table ===
At the European Athletics Team Championships medals are only awarded to teams, with gold, silver, and bronze only referring to the top three finishes.

Rank	Nation	Gold	Silver	Bronze	Total
1	Poland (POL)	10	5	7	22
2	Italy (ITA)	8	6	5	19
3	Great Britain (GBR)	7	7	6	20
4	Germany (GER)	7	5	9	21
5	France (FRA)	4	4	5	13
6	Spain (ESP)	2	10	9	21
7	Portugal (POR)	2	3	0	5
Totals (7 entries)		40	40	41	121

== First League ==
=== Participating countries ===
Participating nations were vying for two promotion spots. Ireland decided not to participate in this edition and was automatically relegated to Second division in 2023.

- Belarus
- Belgium
- Czech Republic
- Estonia
- Finland
- Greece
- Ireland
- Netherlands
- Norway
- Romania
- Sweden
- Switzerland
- Turkey

=== Men's events ===
Event	First		Second		Third	
100 m +0.6 m/s	Jak Ali Harvey; Turkey	10.31	Silvan Wicki; Switzerland	10.36	Joris van Gool; Netherlands	10.42
200 m −0.1 m/s	Jan Jirka; Czech Republic	20.82	Churandy Martina; Netherlands	21.03	Oskari Lehtonen; Finland	21.28
400 m	Jochem Dobber; Netherlands	45.40	Alexander Doom; Belgium	46.08	Pavel Maslák; Czech Republic	46.54
800 m	Mehmet Çelik; Turkey	1:47.48; PB	Markus Einan; Norway	1:47.54	Aurèle Vandeputte; Belgium	1:47.74
1500 m	Ferdinand Kvan Edman; Norway	3:38.63; PB	Adam Dvořáček; Czech Republic	3:39.97	Jochem Vermeulen; Belgium	3:40.02
3000 m	Mike Foppen; Netherlands	7:57.43	Emil Danielsson; Sweden	7:58.72	Eemil Helander; Finland	8:02.22; PB
5000 m	Magnus Tuv Myhre; Norway	13:46.98	Michael Somers; Belgium	13:48.16	Siarhei Krauchenia; Belarus	13:56.47; PB
110 m hurdles	Vitali Parakhonka; Belarus	13.50; SB	Mikdat Sevler; Turkey	13.69	Petr Svoboda; Czech Republic	13.73
400 m hurdles	Rasmus Mägi; Estonia	48.82	Nick Smidt; Netherlands	49.90	Vít Müller; Czech Republic	50.09
3000 m steeplechase	Topi Raitanen; Finland	8:38.30	Damián Vích; Czech Republic	8:39.21; PB	Viachaslau Skudny; Belarus	8:39.94; PB
4×100 m relay	Netherlands Solomon Bockarie; Joris van Gool; Chris Garia; Churandy Martina	38.81	Turkey Ertan Özkan; Jak Ali Harvey; Kayhan Özer; Ramil Guliyev	38.94	Czech Republic Zdeněk Stromšík; Jiří Kubeš; Jan Jirka; Štěpán Hampl	39.07
4×400 m relay	Czech Republic Jan Tesař; Vít Müller; Michal Desenský; Patrik Šorm	3:02.42; EL, NR	Netherlands Nout Wardenburg; Liemarvin Bonevacia; Ramsey Angela; Terrence Agard	3:02.49	Turkey Batuhan Altıntaş; Sinan Ören; Yasmani Copello; İlyas Çanakçı	3:04.96
High jump	Andrei Churyla; Belarus	2.25	Loïc Gasch; Switzerland	2.25	Konstadinos Baniotis; Greece	2.23
Pole vault	Ersu Şaşma; Turkey	5.65	Dominik Alberto; Switzerland	5.55	Jan Kudlička; Czech Republic	5.55; SB
Long jump	Miltiadis Tentoglou; Greece	8.38 (+0.1); CR	Radek Juška; Czech Republic	7.95 (+0.4)	Thobias Montler; Sweden	7.94 (+0.3)
Triple jump	Maksim Niastsiarenka; Belarus	16.65 (−1.0)	Necati Er; Turkey	16.38 (−1.3)	Andreas Pantazis; Greece	16.18 (−0.7)
Shot put	Tomáš Staněk; Czech Republic	20.79	Andrei Toader; Romania	20.20	Marcus Thomsen; Norway	19.90
Discus throw	Alin Firfirică; Romania	62.38	Ola Stunes Isene; Norway	61.26	Philip Milanov; Belgium	61.26
Hammer throw	Eşref Apak; Turkey	77.10; SB	Christos Frantzeskakis; Greece	73.46	Mikalai Bashan; Belarus	73.37
Javelin throw	Lassi Etelätalo; Finland	79.20	Vítězslav Veselý; Czech Republic	78.50	Emin Öncel; Turkey	76.35

=== Women's events ===
Event	First		Second		Third	
100 m	Salomé Kora; Switzerland	11.34	Rani Rosius; Belgium	11.44	Rafaéla Spanoudaki-Hatziriga; Greece	11.45
200 m	Imke Vervaet; Belgium	23.30; SB	Lieke Klaver; Netherlands	23.32	Rafaéla Spanoudaki-Hatziriga; Greece	23.45
400 m	Femke Bol; Netherlands	50.37; CR	Lada Vondrová; Czech Republic	52.11	Moa Hjelmer; Sweden	52.94; SB
800 m	Lore Hoffmann; Switzerland	2:03.89	Britt Ummels; Netherlands	2:04.55	Sara Kuivisto; Finland	2:04.57
1500 m	Sara Kuivisto; Finland	4:15.58	Daryia Barysevich; Belarus	4:15.84	Diana Mezuliáníková; Czech Republic	4:16.71
3000 m	Daryia Barysevich; Belarus	9:01.80; PB	Linn Söderholm; Sweden	9:06.04; PB	Diane van Es; Netherlands	9:07.41; PB
5000 m	Fabienne Schlumpf; Switzerland	15:42.45	Kristiina Mäki; Czech Republic	15:52.94	Samrawit Mengsteab; Sweden	15:57.34
100 m hurdles	Elvira Herman; Belarus	12.62; CR	Anne Zagré; Belgium	12.87; SB	Zoë Sedney; Netherlands	12.94; PB
400 m hurdles	Viivi Lehikoinen; Finland	55.94	Yasmin Giger; Switzerland	56.74	Dimitra Gnafaki; Greece	57.06; PB
3000 m steeplechase	Irene van der Reijken; Netherlands	9:39.00	Elena Adelina Panaet; Romania	9:41.68	Chiara Scherrer; Switzerland	9:45.58; SB
4×100 m relay	Netherlands Leonie van Vliet; Lieke Klaver; Marije van Hunenstijn; Naomi Sedney	43.38	Switzerland Géraldine Frey; Salomé Kora; Cornelia Halbheer; Riccarda Dietsche	43.73	Sweden Claudia Payton; Wilma Rosenquist; Julia Henriksson; Nikki Anderberg	43.92
4×400 m relay	Belarus Yuliya Bliznets; Aliaksandra Khilmanovich; Asteria Uzo Limai; Alina Luchshava	3:28.14	Switzerland Silke Lemmens; Léa Sprunger; Rachel Pellaud; Yasmin Giger	3:28.77	Czech Republic Barbora Malíková; Tereza Petržilková; Zdenka Seidlová; Lada Vondrová	3:30.51
High jump	Salome Lang; Switzerland	1.96 =EL, NR	Daniela Stanciu; Romania	1.92; SB	Maja Nilsson; Sweden	1.90
Pole vault	Angelica Moser; Switzerland	4.65; SB	Eleni-Klaoudia Polak; Greece	4.60 =SB	Elina Lampela; Finland	4.45
Long jump	Florentina Iusco; Romania	6.55	Pauline Hondema; Netherlands	6.40; PB	Tilde Johansson; Sweden	6.36
Triple jump	Senni Salminen; Finland	14.63 (+1.0); EL, NR	Viyaleta Skvartsova; Belarus	14.13 =SB	Spyridoula Karydi; Greece	14.13
Shot put	Emel Dereli; Turkey	18.50; SB	Markéta Červenková; Czech Republic	17.23	Yuliya Leantsiuk; Belarus	17.09
Discus throw	Özlem Becerek; Turkey	58.50	Salla Sipponen; Finland	56.61	Caisa-Marie Lindfors; Sweden	55.10
Hammer throw	Bianca Ghelber; Romania	71.19	Vanessa Sterckendries; Belgium	69.48; SB	Stamatia Scarvelis; Greece	68.76
Javelin throw	Nikola Ogrodníková; Czech Republic	61.86	Viktoryia Bahutskaya; Belarus	58.68; SB	Marie-Therese Obst; Norway	57.07

=== Final standings ===
Pos	Country	Pts	Note
1st place, gold medalist(s)	Czech Republic	320.5	Promoted to First division in 2023
2nd place, silver medalist(s)	Belarus	310	Initially promoted to First division in 2023, later banned
3rd place, bronze medalist(s)	Netherlands	300	
4	Switzerland	279	
5	Turkey	269	
6	Finland	265	
7	Sweden	264.5	
8	Greece	248	
9	Belgium	244	
10	Norway	243	Promoted to First division in 2023, replacing Belarus
11	Romania	207	
12	Estonia	159	
	Ireland	DNP	Relegated to Second division in 2023

NOTES:

- Ireland withdrew citing COVID-19 as the reason and was, subsequently, relegated to Second division in 2023.
- In 2019, the city of Minsk, Belarus, was initially designated as the Super League venue and the team should have been automatically promoted to that division. However, in November 2020, European Athletics decided on Chorzów as the Super League venue due to the political situation in Belarus.
- During this competition, Belarus earned promotion to the higher level, but was later barred from competing due to country's support of the Russian invasion of Ukraine.
- Katsiaryna Karneyenka of Belarus, finishing 7th in the women's 5000 metres, and Kyriakos Zotos of Greece, finishing 5th in the men's shot put, were disqualified after the competition for previous doping violations. Final standings in these disciplines have been changed accordingly.

=== Score table ===
Event		BLR	BEL	CZE	EST	FIN	GRE	NED	NOR	ROU	SWE	SUI	TUR
100 metres	M	1	9	8	6	7	4	10	3	2	5	11	12
100 metres	W	8	11	3	2	7	10	9	6	4	5	12	1
200 metres	M	5	6	12	4	10	3	11	9	2	1	7	8
200 metres	W	6	12	4	2	5	10	11	7	9	8	3	1
400 metres	M	6	11	10	1	2	4	12	9	8	5	7	3
400 metres	W	6	3	11	2	7	8	12	9	1	10	4	5
800 metres	M	7	10	9	6	2	3	4	11	1	8	5	12
800 metres	W	8	6	9	3	10	2	11	7	1	4	12	5
1500 metres	M	7	10	11	1	9	3	8	12	2	5	4	6
1500 metres	W	11	5	10	1	12	4	7	8	2	3	9	6
3000 metres	M	5	9	7	3	10	1	12	8	4	11	2	6
3000 metres	W	12	1	2	4	6	8	10	5	7	11	3	9
5000 metres	M	10	11	5	1	2	4	7	12	9	6	8	3
5000 metres	W	0	5	11	2	3	4	8	9	7	10	12	6
3000 metre steeplechase	M	10	0	11	5	12	2	3	8	4	6	7	9
3000 metre steeplechase	W	9	0	4	5	3	2	12	6	11	8	10	7
110 metre hurdles 100 metre hurdles	M	12	4	10	9	8	3	2	1	5	6	7	11
110 metre hurdles 100 metre hurdles	W	12	11	7	3	5	0	10	4	8	2	9	4
400 metre hurdles	M	4	3	10	12	1	2	11	6	5	9	7	8
400 metre hurdles	W	9	7	6	3	12	10	5	8	1	4	11	2
4 × 100 metres relay	M	6	5	10	7	0	9	12	8	4	3	0	11
4 × 100 metres relay	W	6	8	7	1	5	9	12	4	3	10	11	2
4 × 400 metres relay	M	5	7	12	3	2	1	11	6	8	4	9	10
4 × 400 metres relay	W	12	8	10	2	6	9	7	5	1	4	11	3
High jump	M	12	6.5	3	2	8	10	5	1	4	6.5	11	9
High jump	W	9	7	6	3	5	8	4	1	11	10	12	2
Pole vault	M	7	6	10	5	8	9	3	1	4	2	11	12
Pole vault	W	2	7.5	7.5	4	10	11	6	3	1	9	12	5
Long jump	M	9	8	11	1	4	12	3	7	6	10	5	2
Long jump	W	9	1	3	6	5	7	11	2	12	10	8	4
Triple jump	M	12	6	7	4	9	10	3	0	0	8	5	11
Triple jump	W	11	1	7	4	12	10	5	6	3	9	2	8
Shot put	M	7	3	12	6	4	0	9	10	11	2	5	8
Shot put	W	10	3	11	4	7	5	8	1	2	9	6	12
Discus throw	M	8	10	1	9	2	6	5	11	12	7	4	3
Discus throw	W	5	6	7	4	11	8	9	2	1	10	3	12
Hammer throw	M	10	4	5	6	9	11	3	8	7	1	2	12
Hammer throw	W	3	11	8	6	7	10	1	4	12	9	5	2
Javelin throw	M	8	1	11	2	12	7	4	3	9	6	5	10
Javelin throw	W	11	1	12	5	6	9	4	10	3	8	2	7
Country		BLR	BEL	CZE	EST	FIN	GRE	NED	NOR	ROU	SWE	SUI	TUR
Total		310	244	320.5	159	265	248	300	243	207	264.5	279	269

=== Broken records ===
- Men's Long Jump, CR, Miltiadis Tentoglou, 8,38 m, 19 June 2021
- Men's 4 × 400 m Relay, Final A, EL and NR, CZE (Jan Tesař, Vít Müller, Michal Desenský, Patrik Šorm) 3:02.42, 20 June 2021
- Women's 400 m, Final A, EL and CR, Femke Bol, 50.37, 19 June 2021
- Women's 100 m Hurdles, Final A, CR, Elvira Herman, 12.62, 20 June 2021
- Women's Triple Jump, EL and NR, Senni Salminen, 14.63 m, 19 June 2021

== Second League ==
=== Participating countries ===
Participating nations were vying for three promotion spots. As Russia, Austria, and Israel, decided not to participate in this edition, they were automatically relegated to Third division in 2023.

Austria and Israel withdrew due to the COVID-19 pandemic, while Russia was serving its continuing suspension by the IAAF for gross and systematic doping violations.

- Austria
- Bulgaria
- Croatia
- Denmark
- Hungary
- Iceland
- Israel
- Latvia
- Lithuania
- Russia
- Slovakia
- Slovenia

=== Men's events ===
Event	First		Second		Third	
100 m	Kojo Musah; Denmark	10.21; NR	Roberts Jānis Zālītis; Latvia	10.46 (.456); PB	Tamás Máté; Hungary	10.46 (.460) =PB
200 m	Simon Hansen; Denmark	20.92 (.912); PB	Gediminas Truskauskas; Lithuania	20.92 (.916)	Tamás Máté; Hungary	20.99
400 m	Šimon Bujna; Slovakia	46.32; PB	Luka Janežič; Slovenia	46.37; SB	Gustav Lundholm Nielsen; Denmark	46.98
800 m	Balázs Vindics; Hungary	1:47.83	Jan Vukovič; Slovenia	1:48.28	Benjamin Lobo Vedel; Denmark	1:49.72; PB
1500 m	Simas Bertašius; Lithuania	3:46.24	István Szögi; Hungary	3:47.28	Baldvin Magnússon; Iceland	3:47.54
3000 m	Baldvin Magnússon; Iceland	8:01.56; PB	Joel Ibler Lillesø; Norway	8:01.88; PB	Márk Vörös; Hungary	8:03.26
5000 m	Hlynur Andrésson; Iceland	14:13.73	Levente Szemerei; Hungary	14:20.15	Mikkel Dahl-Jessen; Denmark	14:23.48
110 m hurdles	Stanislav Stankov; Bulgaria	13.86; PB	Filip Jakob Demšar; Slovenia	13.95	Bálint Szeles; Hungary	14.22
400 m hurdles	Máté Koroknai; Hungary	50.00	Martin Kučera; Slovakia	50.66	Maksims Sinčukovs; Latvia	50.87; SB
3000 m steeplechase	Mitko Tsenov; Bulgaria	8:33.80	Jakob Dybdal Abrahamsen; Denmark	8:37.20	István Palkovits; Hungary	8:47.89
4×100 m relay	Denmark Simon Hansen; Frederik Schou-Nielsen; Kojo Musah; Emil Kjær	39.40	Latvia Valērijs Valiņščikovs; Roberts Jānis Zālītis; Oskars Grava; Aleksandrs Kucs	40.22	Slovakia Matej Baluch; Samuel Beladič; Oliver Murcko; Šimon Bujna	40.26
4×400 m relay	Slovenia Jure Grkman; Lovro Mesec Košir; Rok Ferlan; Luka Janežič	3:05.33	Croatia Dominik Škorjanc; Jakov Vuković; Marko Orešković; Mateo Ružić	3:09.47	Latvia Valērijs Valinščikovs; Austris Karpinskis; Maksims Sinčukovs; Iļja Petrušenko	3:09.56
High jump	Tihomir Ivanov; Bulgaria	2.26	Adrijus Glebauskas; Lithuania	2.17	Lukáš Beer; Slovakia	2.17 =SB
Pole vault	Mareks Ārents; Latvia	5.51 =SB	Ján Zmoray; Slovakia	5.10 =SB	Evgeni Enev; Bulgaria	5.10; PB
Long jump	Boris Linkov; Bulgaria	7.72 (+0.4 m/s)	Sebastian Ree Pedersen; Denmark	7.70 (−0.3 m/s)	Edvīns Hadakovs; Latvia	7.43 (+0.4 m/s); SB
Triple jump	Georgi Tsonov; Bulgaria	16.35 (+0.6 m/s); SB	Jan Luxa; Slovenia	16.08 (−0.3 m/s)	Tòrur Mortensen; Denmark	15.45 (+0.1 m/s); PB
Shot put	Kristoffer Thomsen; Denmark	19.21	Georgi Ivanov; Bulgaria	18.10; SB	Balázs Tóth; Hungary	17.93
Discus throw	Kristjan Čeh; Slovenia	66.55	Andrius Gudžius; Lithuania	63.90	Martin Marković; Croatia	62.75
Hammer throw	Marcel Lomnický; Slovakia	76.18	Dániel Rába; Hungary	71.92	Nikola Mikhov; Bulgaria	65.80
Javelin throw	Edis Matusevičius; Lithuania	83.00; SB	Patriks Gailums; Latvia	78.13	Mark Slavov; Bulgaria	77.92; SB

=== Women's events ===
Event	First		Second		Third	
100 m	Jusztina Csóti; Hungary	11.65; PB	Monika Weigertová; Slovakia	11.70	Mathilde Kramer; Denmark	11.73
100 m	Jusztina Csóti; Hungary	11.65; PB	Monika Weigertová; Slovakia	11.70	Maja Mihalinec Zidar; Slovenia	11.73
200 m	Akvilė Andriukaitytė; Lithuania	23.66	Inna Eftimova; Bulgaria	23.67	Jusztina Csóti; Hungary	23.71; PB
400 m	Evelin Nádházy; Hungary	52.85; SB			Anita Horvat; Slovenia	52.94
400 m	Agnė Šerkšnienė; Lithuania	52.85			Anita Horvat; Slovenia	52.94
800 m	Bianka Bartha-Kéri; Hungary	2:02.72	Jerneja Smonkar; Slovenia	2:03.37; PB	Līga Velvere; Latvia	2:03.49
1500 m	Maja Pačarić; Croatia	4:23.68; SB	Gréta Varga; Hungary	4:24.33; SB	Lucia Hrivnák Klocová; Slovakia	4:25.82
3000 m	Klara Lukan; Slovenia	8:48.80; EU23L	Bojana Bjeljac; Croatia	9:10.65; PB	Helene Svane; Denmark	9:29.34; PB
5000 m	Maruša Mišmaš-Zrimsek; Slovenia	15:30.61; PB	Laura Valgreen Petersen; Denmark	16:03.87	Bojana Bjeljac; Croatia	16:05.10; SB
100 m hurdles	Stanislava Škvarková; Slovakia	13.33	Mette Graversgaard; Denmark	13.36	Ivana Lončarek; Croatia	13.43
400 m hurdles	Modesta Justė Morauskaitė; Lithuania	56.28; PB	Daniela Ledecká; Slovakia	56.36; PB	Janka Molnár; Hungary	56.81
3000 m steeplechase	Anna Emilie Møller; Denmark	9:49.93	Greta Karinauskaitė; Lithuania	10:04.92; PB	Zita Kácser; Hungary	10:28.36; SB
4×100 m relay	Hungary Bettina Kéri; Jusztina Csóti; Boglárka Takács; Klaudia Sorok	44.38	Denmark Mathilde Kramer; Astrid Glenner-Frandsen; Mette Graversgaard; Emma Beiter Bomme	44.58	Slovenia Joni Tomičić Prezelj; Agata Zupin; Maja Pogorevc; Maja Mihalinec Zidar	45.28
4×400 m relay	Hungary Evelin Nádházy; Bianka Bartha-Kéri; Sára Mátó; Janka Molnár	3:30.82	Slovenia Agata Zupin; Jerneja Smonkar; Maja Pogorevc; Anita Horvat	3:30.90; NR	Slovakia Emma Zapletalová; Iveta Putalová; Simona Malatincová; Daniela Ledecká	3:34.29
High jump	Airinė Palšytė; Lithuania	1.93; SB	Mirela Demireva; Bulgaria	1.91; SB	Lia Apostolovski; Slovenia	1.88; SB
Pole vault	Tina Šutej; Slovenia	4.25	Hanga Klekner; Hungary	4.15; SB	Caroline Bonde Holm; Denmark	4.15
Long jump	Petra Farkas; Hungary	6.43	Jogailė Petrokaitė; Lithuania	6.43; SB	Neja Filipič; Slovenia	6.27
Triple jump	Gabriela Petrova; Bulgaria	14.42; SB	Neja Filipič; Slovenia	14.21	Dovilė Kilty; Lithuania	13.95; SB
Shot put	Erna Sóley Gunnarsdóttir; Iceland	15.94	Marija Tolj; Croatia	15.60; SB	Violetta Veiland; Hungary	15.48
Discus throw	Marija Tolj; Croatia	58.78	Kathrine Bebe; Denmark	56.89	Dóra Kerekes; Hungary	56.63; PB
Hammer throw	Katrine Koch Jacobsen; Denmark	68.38; NR	Laura Igaune; Latvia	67.95	Martina Hrašnová; Slovakia	67.11
Javelin throw	Liveta Jasiūnaitė; Lithuania	61.18; SB	Madara Palameika; Latvia	55.77	Angéla Moravcsik; Hungary	52.48

=== Final standings ===
Pos	Country	Pts	Note
1st place, gold medalist(s)	Hungary	255	Promoted to First division in 2023
2nd place, silver medalist(s)	Denmark	245.5	Promoted to First division in 2023
3rd place, bronze medalist(s)	Slovenia	233	Promoted to First division in 2023
4	Lithuania	203	
5	Bulgaria	197	
6	Slovakia	187.5	
7	Latvia	177.5	
8	Croatia	174	
9	Iceland	116.5	
	Israel	DNP	Relegated to Third division in 2023
	Austria	DNP	Relegated to Third division in 2023
	Russia	DNP	Relegated to Third division in 2023

=== Score table ===
Event		BUL	CRO	DEN	HUN	ISL	LAT	LTU	SVK	SLO
100 metres	M	5	3	9	7	1	8	6	2	4
100 metres	W	5	1	6.5	9	4	2	3	8	6.5
200 metres	M	5	2	9	7	1	3	8	6	4
200 metres	W	8	4	5	7	0	0	9	3	6
400 metres	M	3	4	7	5	1	6	2	9	8
400 metres	W	3	5	4	8.5	1	2	8.5	6	7
800 metres	M	4	5	7	9	2	1	6	3	8
800 metres	W	2	6	5	9	1	7	3	4	8
1500 metres	M	6	3.5	5	8	7	3.5	9	1	2
1500 metres	W	3	9	5	8	1	6	2	7	4
3000 metres	M	3	4	8	7	9	5	2	1	6
3000 metres	W	2	8	7	3	1	6	4	5	9
5000 metres	M	6	2	7	8	9	5	3	1	4
5000 metres	W	5	7	8	6	2	3	4	1	9
3000 metre steeplechase	M	9	4	8	7	6	2	5	3	1
3000 metre steeplechase	W	1	5	9	7	3	2	8	4	6
110 metre hurdles 100 metre hurdles	M	9	2	4	7	1	5	6	3	8
110 metre hurdles 100 metre hurdles	W	6	7	8	4	3	2	0	9	5
400 metre hurdles	M	1	4	5	9	3	7	2	8	6
400 metre hurdles	W	5	3	4	7	1	2	9	8	6
4 × 100 metres relay	M	3	4.5	9	0	2	8	4.5	7	6
4 × 100 metres relay	W	5	3	8	9	4	2	0	6	7
4 × 400 metres relay	M	4	8	5	0	2	7	3	6	9
4 × 400 metres relay	W	2	4	5	9	1	3	6	7	8
High jump	M	9	3.5	3.5	5	6	0	8	7	2
High jump	W	8	3.5	3.5	6	1.5	5	9	1.5	7
Pole vault	M	7	2	3	5.5	1	9	4	8	5.5
Pole vault	W	4	6	7	8	3	2	0	5	9
Long jump	M	9	4	8	3	1	7	2	6	5
Long jump	W	5	1	3	9	2	6	8	4	7
Triple jump	M	9	3	7	6	1	5	4	2	8
Triple jump	W	9	6	0	4	3	5	7	2	8
Shot put	M	8	3	9	7	2	1	4	6	5
Shot put	W	1	8	6	7	9	5	4	2	3
Discus throw	M	2	7	4	5	6	1	8	3	9
Discus throw	W	3	9	8	7	2	5	4	1	6
Hammer throw	M	7	1	6	8	2	5	4	9	3
Hammer throw	W	0	3	9	5	4	8	6	7	2
Javelin throw	M	7	1	5	2	6	8	9	3	4
Javelin throw	W	4	5	6	7	1	8	9	3	2
Country		BUL	CRO	DEN	HUN	ISL	LAT	LTU	SVK	SLO
Total		197	174	245.5	255	116.5	177.5	203	187.5	233

== Third League ==
Participating nations were vying for four promotion spots.

=== Participating countries ===
- AASSE (Gibraltar, Liechtenstein, Monaco)
- Albania
- Andorra
- Armenia
- Azerbaijan
- Bosnia and Herzegovina
- Cyprus
- Georgia
- Luxembourg
- Kosovo
- Malta
- North Macedonia
- Moldova
- Montenegro
- San Marino
- Serbia

=== Men's events ===
Event	First		Second		Third	
100 m	Stavros Avgoustinou; Cyprus	10.53; PB	Alexander Donigian; Armenia	10.65	Aleksa Kijanović; Serbia	10.70
200 m	Mindia Endeladze; Georgia	21.30 =PB	Boško Kijanović; Serbia	21.31; SB	Jovan Stojoski; North Macedonia	21.41
400 m	Franko Burraj; Albania	46.80; SB	Jovan Stojoski; North Macedonia	46.94	Boško Kijanović; Serbia	47.05; SB
800 m	Stavros Spyrou; Cyprus	1:49.61	Aleksa Tomić; Serbia	1:50.62; PB	Pol Moya; Andorra	1:51.04
1500 m	Elzan Bibić; Serbia	3:48.96	Jordan Gusman; Malta	3:50.38	Yervand Mkrtchyan; Armenia	3:50.84
3000 m	Jordan Gusman; Malta	7:53.70; NR	Elzan Bibić; Serbia	7:55.51	Dario Ivanovski; North Macedonia	8:06.66; NR
5000 m	Amine Khadiri; Cyprus	14:22.58	Miloš Malešević; Serbia	14:23.22; PB	Nahuel Carabaña; Andorra	14:25.93
110 m hurdles	Milan Trajkovic; Cyprus	13.82; SB	Luka Trgovčević; Serbia	14.04	François Grailet; Luxembourg	14.12
400 m hurdles	Rusmir Malkočević; Bosnia and Herzegovina	51.21; PB	Andrea Ercolani Volta; San Marino	53.42	Cristin Eșanu; Moldova	53.73; PB
3000 m steeplechase	Yervand Mkrtchyan; Armenia	8:59.80	Nikolas Fragkou; Cyprus	9:03.02; SB	Miloš Malešević; Serbia	9:03.92
4×100 m relay	Serbia Stefan Mihajlov; Boško Kijanović; Mihajlo Mandić; Aleksa Kijanović	40.79	Cyprus Emmanouil Christodoulou; Alex Beechey; Dimitris Hadjisergis; Stavros Avgoustinou	40.85	Bosnia and Herzegovina Edhem Vikalo; Hajrudin Vejzović; Rusmir Malkočević; Egon Savić	41.19; NR
4×400 m relay	Moldova Ivan Galușco; Adrian Iordan; Ian-Gheorghe Vieru; Cristin Eșanu	3:16.00	Luxembourg Olivier Juncker; Aymen Djazouli; Max Juncker; Philippe Hilger	3:17.55	Cyprus Michalis Chrysostomou; Anastasios Vasileiou; Andreas Demetriades; Georgios Choratta	3:18.21
High jump	Vasilios Konstantinou; Cyprus	2.12	Eugenio Rossi; San Marino	2.08	Slavko Stević; Serbia	2.08
Pole vault	Nikandros Stylianou; Cyprus	5.15; SB	Miloš Savić; Serbia	4.85	Miquel Vílchez; Andorra	4.85; SB
Long jump	Lazar Anić; Serbia	7.83	Izmir Smajlaj; Albania	7.70	Bachana Khorava; Georgia	7.64
Triple jump}	Levon Aghasyan; Armenia	16.77 (+0.5); SB	Lasha Gulelauri; Georgia	16.05 (+0.1)	Rüstəm Məmmədov; Azerbaijan	15.43 (−0.1)
Shot put	Bob Bertemes; Luxembourg	21.02	Asmir Kolašinac; Serbia	20.45	Tomaš Đurović; Montenegro	20.20
Discus throw	Apostolos Parellis; Cyprus	59.27	Danijel Furtula; Montenegro	57.97	Bob Bertemes; Luxembourg	57.04
Hammer throw	Serghei Marghiev; Moldova	74.49	Alexandros Poursanidis; Cyprus	71.09	Vojislav Gvero; Serbia	62.60
Javelin throw	Andrian Mardare; Moldova	82.57	Vedran Samac; Serbia	81.35; PB	Dejan Mileusnić; Bosnia and Herzegovina	73.78

=== Women's events ===
Event	First		Second		Third	
100 m	Olivia Fotopoulou; Cyprus	11.42	Patrizia van der Weken; Luxembourg	11.55; SB	Milana Tirnanić; Serbia	11.63
200 m	Olivia Fotopoulou; Cyprus	23.31; PB	Ivana Ilić; Serbia	23.85	Anaïs Bauer; Luxembourg	24.62; SB
400 m	Eleni Artymata; Cyprus	51.79; SB	Dragana Macanović; Serbia	55.26; PB	Drita Islami; North Macedonia	55.32; PB
800 m	Marija Stambolić; Serbia	2:07.12	Kalliopi Kountouri; Cyprus	2:09.86; PB	Ellada Alaverdyan; Armenia	2:12.49; PB
1500 m	Vera Hoffmann; Luxembourg	4:26.64	Dunja Sikima; Serbia	4:27.87; PB	Natalia Evangelidou; Cyprus	4:27.95
3000 m	Meropi Panagiotou; Cyprus	9:38.18	Teodora Simović; Serbia	9:40.99; SB	Lilia Fisikovici; Moldova	9:42.28; SB
5000 m	Lilia Fisikovici; Moldova	16:43.15	Martine Mellina; Luxembourg	16:44.53	Olivera Jevtić; Serbia	17:08.29; SB
100 m hurdles	Natalia Christofi; Cyprus	13.55	Anja Lukić; Serbia	13.84	Iuliana Dovganici; Moldova	14.70; SB
400 m hurdles	Drita Islami; North Macedonia	57.53; NR	Maja Gajić; Serbia	59.91	Miranta Kyriakou; Cyprus	1:01.64; PB
3000 m steeplechase	Luiza Gega; Albania	9:39.56	Andreea Stăvilă; Moldova	11:08.87; PB	Gresa Bakraqi; Kosovo	11:11.59
4×100 m relay	Cyprus Olivia Fotopoulou; Marianna Pisiara; Ramona Papaioannou; Eleni Artymata	44.61	Serbia Anja Lukić; Ivana Ilić; Milana Tirnanić; Tamara Vuletić	45.25	Malta Claire Azzopardi; Carla Scicluna; Sarah Busuttil; Charlotte Wingfield	46.27
4×400 m relay	Cyprus Thekla Alexandrou; Kalliopi Kountouri; Kalypso Stavrou; Eleni Artymata	3:41.52; NR	Serbia Andrea Sremac; Tijana Japundžić; Aleksandra Pešić; Dragana Macanović	3:44.17	Moldova Xenia Berghii; Iana Garaeva; Tatiana Contrebut; Madalina Culea	3:46.11
High jump	Marija Vuković; Montenegro	1.90	Angelina Topić; Serbia	1.85	Styliana Ioannidou; Cyprus	1.79
Pole vault	Lara Buekens; Luxembourg	3.85; PB	Peppijna Dalli; Malta	3.80; NR	Maria Aristotelous; Cyprus	3.55
Long jump	Milica Gardašević; Serbia	6.54	Filippa Fotopoulou; Cyprus	6.34	Claire Azzopardi; Malta	5.84
Triple jump	Anastasia Senchiv; Moldova	13.33; PB	Jovana Gnjatović; Serbia	12.73	Yana Sargsyan; Armenia	12.68
Shot put	Alexandra Emilianov; Moldova	16.50	Stéphanie Krumlovsky; Luxembourg	14.26	Mediha Salkić; Bosnia and Herzegovina	13.58
Discus throw	Alexandra Emilianov; Moldova	56.41	Dragana Tomašević; Serbia	56.30	Androniki Lada; Cyprus	52.98
Hammer throw	Zalina Petrivskaya; Moldova	70.33	Chrystalla Kyriakou; Cyprus	62.18	Nino Tsikvadze; Georgia	59.61
Javelin throw	Marija Vučenović; Serbia	57.13	Vanja Spajić; Bosnia and Herzegovina	52.31	Noémie Pleimling; Luxembourg	49.70

=== Final standings ===
Pos	Country	Pts	Note
1st place, gold medalist(s)	Serbia	570	Promoted to Second division in 2023
2nd place, silver medalist(s)	Cyprus	539	Promoted to Second division in 2023
3rd place, bronze medalist(s)	Moldova	481	Promoted to Second division in 2023
4	Luxembourg	465	Promoted to Second division in 2023
5	Bosnia and Herzegovina	441.5	
6	Malta	354.5	
7	Montenegro	318	
8	Georgia	304	
9	Armenia	300	
10	Andorra	273	
11	North Macedonia	272	
12	San Marino	269.5	
13	Albania	158	
14	AASSE	136.5	
15	Azerbaijan	83	
16	Kosovo	78	

- Source:.

=== Score table ===
Event		AASSE	ALB	AND	ARM	AZE	BIH	CYP	GEO	KOS	LUX	MLT	MDA	MNE	MKD	SMR	SRB
100 metres	M	5	4	6	15	0	11	16	3	0	9	7	10	8	13	12	14
100 metres	W	8	0	3	7	0	9	16	10	6	15	12	13	5	4	11	14
200 metres	M	3	0	4	12	7	9	13	16	0	10	8	11	5	14	6	15
200 metres	W	4	0	7	12	0	10	16	9	0	14	13	11	8	6	5	15
400 metres	M	3	16	8	5	9	11	12	13	0	10	0	7	4	15	6	14
400 metres	W	4	10	8	13	0	7	16	2	9	6	12	11	3	14	5	15
800 metres	M	0	10	14	8	0	12	16	7	11	9	6	13	4	5	3	15
800 metres	W	0	9	6	14	0	10	15	11	12	13	7	8	5	3	4	16
1500 metres	M	0	0	6	14	0	13	10	9	8	11	15	7	5	12	4	16
1500 metres	W	0	0	9	13	0	12	14	11	0	16	8	10	6	7	5	15
3000 metres	M	4	0	7	8	0	10	13	9	0	12	16	11	5	14	6	15
3000 metres	W	0	12	4	0	8	10	16	7	0	13	11	14	5	9	6	15
5000 metres	M	6	4	14	8	0	10	16	0	0	11	12	13	5	9	7	15
5000 metres	W	0	0	10	0	0	11	0	0	0	15	13	16	9	12	0	14
3000 metre steeplechase	M	0	0	7	16	0	12	15	11	0	8	10	13	6	9	0	14
3000 metre steeplechase	W	0	16	13	10	0	0	12	7	14	9	11	15	0	0	0	8
110 metre hurdles 100 metre hurdles	M	0	10	7	0	0	11	16	8	0	14	13	12	9	0	6	15
110 metre hurdles 100 metre hurdles	W	0	12	9	10	0	13	16	4	0	8	5	14	11	7	6	15
400 metre hurdles	M	0	8	6	9	0	16	13	10	0	7	5	14	11	0	15	12
400 metre hurdles	W	7	9	8	6	0	12	14	5	0	10	3	13	4	16	11	15
4 × 100 metres relay	M	7	0	8	11	0	14	15	10	0	13	0	0	9	6	12	16
4 × 100 metres relay	W	7	0	6	0	0	9	16	0	0	13	14	12	10	8	11	15
4 × 400 metres relay	M	0	0	9	0	0	13	14	11	0	15	8	16	6	7	10	12
4 × 400 metres relay	W	9	0	5	11	0	12	16	6	0	13	10	14	7	4	8	15
High jump	M	8	6	5	0	0	12	16	7	10	13	4	11	9	0	15	14
High jump	W	0	0	7	0	0	13	14	8	0	10	0	11	16	9	12	15
Pole vault	M	10.5	0	14	0	0	10.5	16	0	0	13	7.5	9	12	0	7.5	15
Pole vault	W	0	0	0	0	0	11	14	0	0	16	15	12	0	0	13	10
Long jump	M	3	15	7	13	6	5	10	14	0	8	12	9	11	2	4	16
Long jump	W	5	0	3	9	10	8	15	6	0	12	14	13	11	7	4	16
Triple jump	M	0	11	7	16	14	12	0	15	0	6	9	10	8	0	5	13
Triple jump	W	5	0	0	14	12	7	10	8	0	9	11	16	13	0	6	15
Shot put	M	0	0	6	8	10	13	11	12	0	16	4	9	14	7	5	15
Shot put	W	11	0	5	8	0	14	12	4	0	15	6	16	9	10	7	13
Discus throw	M	0	0	5	6	7	12	16	13	8	14	9	11	15	4	3	10
Discus throw	W	12	0	6	0	0	13	14	9	0	11	7	16	10	8	5	15
Hammer throw	M	0	0	9	7	0	13	15	0	0	10	12	16	11	8	6	14
Hammer throw	W	0	0	8	0	0	12	15	14	0	11	10	16	9	7	6	13
Javelin throw	M	4	6	3	7	0	14	12	10	0	13	9	16	11	8	5	15
Javelin throw	W	11	0	4	10	0	15	13	5	0	14	6	12	9	8	7	16
Country		AASSE	ALB	AND	ARM	AZE	BIH	CYP	GEO	KOS	LUX	MLT	MDA	MNE	MKD	SMR	SRB
Total		136.5	158	273	300	83	441.5	539	304	78	465	354.5	481	318	272	269.5	570
