= North Macedonia at the 2024 European Athletics Championships =

- Flag of North Macedonia
- WA code: MKD
- National federation: Royal Dutch Athletics Federation

in Rome, Italy 7 June 2024 – 12 June 2022
- Competitors: 2 (2 men)
- Medals: Gold 0 Silver 0 Bronze 0 Total 0

European Athletics Championships appearances
- 1998; 2002; 2006; 2010; 2012; 2014; 2016; 2018; 2022; 2024; 2026

Athletes from the North Macedonia competed at the 2024 European Athletics Championships in the Stadio Olimpico in Rome, Italy from 7 to 12 June 2024.

== Results ==
North Macedonia entered the following athletes.

Key

- Q = Qualified for the next round
- q = Qualified for the next round as a fastest loser or, in field events, by position without achieving the qualifying target
- DNS = Did not start
- DNF = Did not finish
- — = Round not applicable for the event
- CR = Championship record
- EM35R = European masters over-35 record
- PB = Personal best
- WL = World leading result
- EL = European leading result
- EU23L = European under-23 leading result
- SB = Season best

=== Men ===
Track and road events

Athlete	Event	Heat		Semifinal		Final	
Athlete	Event	Result	Rank	Result	Rank	Result	Rank
Dario Ivanovski	Half marathon	—N/a				1:04:01 NR	29

Field events

Athlete	Event	Qualification		Final	
Athlete	Event	Distance	Position	Distance	Position
Andreas Trajkovski	Long jump	7.73	22	Did not advance	
