= Macedonia at the 2016 European Athletics Championships =

- WA code: MKD
- National federation: AFM
- Website: www.afm.org.mk

in Amsterdam
- Competitors: 1
- Medals: Gold 0 Silver 0 Bronze 0 Total 0

European Athletics Championships appearances
- 1998; 2002; 2006; 2010; 2012; 2014; 2016; 2018; 2022; 2024

Macedonia competed at the 2016 European Athletics Championships in Amsterdam, Netherlands, between 6 and 10 July 2016.

== Results ==
Women

Track & road events

Athlete	Event	Heat		Semifinal		Final	
Athlete	Event	Result	Rank	Result	Rank	Result	Rank
Drita Islami	400 m hurdles	1:02.36	24	did not advance			
