= List of Macedonian records in athletics =

The following are the national records in athletics in North Macedonia maintained by its national athletics federation: Athletic Federation of North Macedonia (AFNM).

== Outdoor ==
Key to tables: Awaiting ratification Record not kept by AFM Not ratified or later rescinded AFM

=== Men ===
Event	Record	Athlete	Date	Meet	Place	Ref.
60 m	6.86 NWI	Riste Pandev	2014			
100 m	10.50 (+1.6 m/s)	Andreas Trajkovski	11 June 2022	Copenhagen Open	Hvidovre, Denmark	
100 m	10.5 h NWI	Naum Mitrevski	13 June 2003		Skopje, Republic of Macedonia	
200 m	21.32 (+0.1 m/s)	Jovan Stojoski	30 June 2019	Miting AK Novi Grad	Sarajevo, Bosnia and Herzegovina	
300 m	33.83	Jovan Stojoski	3 October 2020		Skopje, North Macedonia	
300 m	33.7 h	Laso Miloscheski	1950		Maribor, S.F.R. Yugoslavia	
400 m	46.27	Ismail Mačev	13 September 1983	Mediterranean Games	Casablanca, Morocco	
800 m	1:47.14	Vančo Stojanov	10 May 2002		Sofia, Bulgaria	
1000 m	2:26.8 h	Vančo Stojanov	16 April 1995		Skopje, Republic of Macedonia	
1000 m	2:28.04	Dario Ivanovski	12 June 2016		Skopje, Republic of Macedonia	
1000 m	2:25.14	Dario Ivanovski	8 June 2016		Skopje, Republic of Macedonia	
1500 m	3:45.97 (Note: ratified by AFNM but not recognized by World Athletics)	Vančo Stojanov	15 May 2001		Sofia, Bulgaria	
1500 m	3:46.6 h	Sotir Gavrilovski	27 June 1970		S.F.R. Yugoslavia	
2000 m	5:21.81	Vančo Stojanov	19 April 1997		Skopje, Republic of Macedonia	
3000 m	8:06.66	Dario Ivanovski	20 June 2021	European Team Championships	Limassol, Cyprus	
5000 m	13:54.58	Dario Ivanovski	3 July 2022 (Note: by World Athletics source; 22 July by AFNM source, a typo)	Mediterranean Games	Oran, Algeria	
5 km (road)	15:10+	Dario Ivanovski	18 February 2024	Seville Marathon	Seville, Spain	
10,000 m	29:07.94	Dario Ivanovski	4 April 2026	North Macedonian Cup	Skopje, North Macedonia	
10 km (road)	29:56	Dario Ivanovski	10 November 2024	North Macedonian 10K Championships	Gevgelija, North Macedonia	
15,000 m (track)	48:06.3 h	Gorgi Buckov	19 March 1973		Skopje, S.F.R. Yugoslavia	
15 km (road)	45:34+	Dario Ivanovski	18 February 2024	Seville Marathon	Seville, Spain	
One hour	17241 m+	Lubischa Trboevski	1967		Skopje, S.F.R. Yugoslavia	
20,000 m (track)	1:09:28.6 h	Lubischa Trboevski	1967		Skopje, S.F.R. Yugoslavia	
20 km (road)	1:00:42+	Dario Ivanovski	18 February 2024	Seville Marathon	Seville, Spain	
Half marathon	1:04:01	Dario Ivanovski	9 June 2024	European Championships	Rome, Italy	
25 km (road)	1:15:53+	Dario Ivanovski	18 February 2024	Seville Marathon	Seville, Spain	
30 km (road)	1:30:56+	Dario Ivanovski	18 February 2024	Seville Marathon	Seville, Spain	
Marathon	2:08:26 (Note: by official result source and World Athletics source; 2:08:25 by other sources)	Dario Ivanovski	18 February 2024	Seville Marathon	Seville, Spain	
24 hours	230 km	Trayce Michov	27 January 2018		Athens, Greece	
110 m hurdles	14.46	Robert Kosev	21 July 1993		Sofia, Bulgaria	
110 m hurdles	14.3 h	Robert Kosev	25 May 1991		Skopje, S.F.R. Yugoslavia	
200 m hurdles	27.4 h	Becko Brajevik	1966		Skopje, S.F.R. Yugoslavia	
300 m hurdles	39.37	Vasil Bacovski	1980		Ohrid, S.F.R. Yugoslavia	
300 m hurdles	39.3 h	Vasil Bacovski	1980		Ohrid, S.F.R. Yugoslavia	
400 m hurdles	52.33	Jovan Stojoski	19 June 2024	International Athletics Meeting Maribor and Memorial of Iztok Ciglarič	Maribor, Slovenia	
1500 m steeplechase	4:20.3 h	Riste Pavlov	10 July 1967		Skopje, S.F.R. Yugoslavia	
2000 m steeplechase	6:47.92	Trpe Martinovski	1983		Maribor, S.F.R. Yugoslavia	
2000 m steeplechase	6:16.4 h	Hechat Aliu	1975		Belgrade, S.F.R. Yugoslavia	
3000 m steeplechase	9:10.4 h	Gorgi Vuckov	12 September 1971		Belgrade, S.F.R. Yugoslavia	
High jump	2.10 m	Redzhep Selman	5 July 2003		Plovdiv, Bulgaria	
Pole vault	4.05 m (Note: Outdoor best, indoor mark ratified as absolute record)	Ognen Stefanovski	25 June 2025	European Team Championships	Maribor, Slovenia	
Long jump	7.91 m (+1.9 m/s)	Andreas Trajkovski	30 July 2023	Weitsprungmeeting Inneringen	Inneringen, Germany	
Triple jump	15.46 m	Redzhep Selman	22 June 2008		Banská Bystrica, Slovakia	
Shot put	16.66 m (Note: ratified by AFNM but not recognized by World Athletics)	Vasil Haidov	8 June 2002		Skopje, Republic of Macedonia	
Shot put	16.01 m (Note: recognized by World Athletics)	Saso Ilov	26 June 1998		Skopje, Republic of Macedonia	
Discus throw	50.62 m (Note: ratified by AFNM but not recognized by World Athletics)	Ilijan Manolev	26 April 1997		Ohrid, Republic of Macedonia	
Discus throw	49.73 m (Note: recognized by World Athletics)	Ilijan Manolev	28 August 1998		Skopje, Republic of Macedonia	
Hammer throw	47.82 m	Ilija Spasovski	14 July 1971		Novi Sad, S.F.R. Yugoslavia	
Javelin throw	76.50 m	Dejan Angelovski	15 July 2002		Skopje, Republic of Macedonia	
Decathlon	6648 pts	Ognen Stefanovski	17–18 July 2025	European U23 Championships	Bergen, Norway	
Decathlon	100m (wind) / Long jump (wind) / Shot put / High jump / 400m / 110m H (wind) / Discus / Pole vault / Javelin / 1500m; 11.46 (−1.2 m/s) / 6.61 m (+1.9 m/s) / 11.79 m / 1.76 m / 50.41 / 15.40 (+0.5 m/s) / 34.93 m / 3.80 m / 47.14 m / 4:35.45					
5000 m (track)	26:33.4 h	Zoran Malinov	1977		Skopje, S.F.R. Yugoslavia	
10,000 m (track)	56:10.4 h	Zoran Malinov	1977		Skopje, S.F.R. Yugoslavia	
20 km walk (road)						
50 km walk (road)						
4 × 100 m relay	40.89	North Macedonia; Andreas Trajkovski; Marko Aleksovski; Mihail Petrov; Jovan Stojoski	24 June 2025	European Team Championships	Maribor, Slovenia	
4 × 200 m relay	1:35.0	AK Rabotnicki; Blagoev; Bangelov; Gorubinski; Cadikovski	1969		Skopje, S.F.R. Yugoslavia	
4 × 400 m relay	3:20.69	Macedonia; Kristijan Efremov; Bujar Beqiri; Aleksandar Stojanovski; Slave Koevski	22 June 2014	European Team Championships Third League	Tbilisi, Georgia	
4 × 400 m relay	3:17.9 h (Note: recognised by World Athletics as absolute record)	SR Macedonia; Sokol Sacevski; Branko Ilievski; A. Bojadjiev; Z. Todorovski	6 July 1980		Kralevo, Bulgaria	
Swedish relay	2:02.2 h	Bucevski; Jakimovski; Blagoev; Michailov	23 October 1966		Skopje, S.F.R. Yugoslavia	

=== Women ===
Event	Record	Athlete	Date	Meet	Place	Ref.
60 m	7.5 h NWI	Vera Veljanovska	15 July 1971		Pula, S.F.R. Yugoslavia	
100 m	11.74 (+1.7 m/s)	Aleksandra Vojneska	3 July 2004		Istanbul, Turkey	
100 m	11.6 h	Vera Veljanovska	28 July 1973		Bucharest, Romania	
200 m	23.75 (Note: ratified by AFNM but not recognized by World Athletics)	Aleksandra Vojneska	27 June 2004		Skopje, Republic of Macedonia	
200 m	24.06 (Note: recognized by World Athletics)	Vera Veljanovska	3 August 1974		Sofia, Bulgaria	
300 m	41.35	Christina Risteska	14 September 2013		Skopje, Republic of Macedonia	
300 m	39.1 h	Elizabeta Bozinovska	1980		Skopje, S.F.R. Yugoslavia	
400 m	53.77	Elizabeta Bozinovska	14 June 1983		Nova Gorica, S.F.R. Yugoslavia	
600 m	1:35.70	Zhaneta Drnkovska	2 July 1989		Ljubljana, S.F.R. Yugoslavia	
800 m	2:09.8 h	Elizabeta Bozinovska	17 May 1981		Skopje, S.F.R. Yugoslavia	
800 m	2:12.87	Daniela Kuleska	30 June 2001		Skopje, Republic of Macedonia	
1000 m	2:54.72	Daniela Kuleska	17 July 1999		Skopje, Republic of Macedonia	
1500 m	4:24.90	Daniela Kuleska	17 July 2003	European U23 Championships	Bydgoszcz, Poland	
2000 m	6:06.8 h	Daniela Kuleska	8 July 2004		Sofia, Bulgaria	
3000 m	9:49.83	Daniela Kuleska	12 July 2003		Thebes, Greece	
5000 m	16:50.89	Adrijana Pop Arsova	19 June 2022	Balkan Championships	Craiova, Romania	
5 km (road)	18:06+	Adrijana Pop Arsova	15 May 2022	Copenhagen Marathon	Copenhagen, Denmark	
10,000 m	35:00.30	Adrijana Pop Arsova	17 April 2022	North Macedonian 10000m Cup	Skopje, North Macedonia	
10 km (road)	35:09	Adrijana Pop Arsova	10 June 2022		Karlovac, Croatia	
10 km (road)	35:07	Adrijana Pop Arsova	13 June 2021		Skopje, North Macedonia	
10 km (road)	34:02	Adrijana Pop Arsova	5 November 2022		Gevgelija, North Macedonia	
15 km (road)	54:26+	Adrijana Pop Arsova	15 May 2022	Copenhagen Marathon	Copenhagen, Denmark	
20 km (road)	1:12:46+	Adrijana Pop Arsova	15 May 2022	Copenhagen Marathon	Copenhagen, Denmark	
Half marathon	1:16:06	Adrijana Pop Arsova	2 October 2022		Skopje, North Macedonia	
Half marathon	1:13:39	Adrijana Pop Arsova	12 March 2023		Trikala, Greece	
25 km (road)	1:30:49+	Adrijana Pop Arsova	15 May 2022	Copenhagen Marathon	Copenhagen, Denmark	
30 km (road)	1:49:28+	Adrijana Pop Arsova	15 May 2022	Copenhagen Marathon	Copenhagen, Denmark	
Marathon	2:35:29	Adrijana Pop Arsova	15 May 2022	Copenhagen Marathon	Copenhagen, Denmark	
24 hours	180 km	Kateryna Schipovik	10 March 2019		Belgrade, Serbia	
24 hours	211,059 km	Katerina Shipovikj	23 September 2023	Sri Chinmoy 6-12-24 Hour Race	Belgrade, Serbia	
100 m hurdles	13.36 (+1.0 m/s)	Elisabeta Pavlovska	24 May 1994		Sofia, Bulgaria	
400 m hurdles	57.53	Drita Islami	19 June 2021	European Team Championships	Limassol, Cyprus	
3000 m steeplechase	11:49.49	Milijana Ristikj	24 June 2025	European Team Championships	Maribor, Slovenia	
High jump	1.72 m	Marina Mihajlova	23 September 1987	Mediterranean Games	Latakia, Syria	
Pole vault	2.20 m	Mihaela Lazarovska	21 June 2023	European Team Championships	Chorzów, Poland	
Long jump	6.17 m	Marina Mihajlova	5 October 1987		Skopje, S.F.R. Yugoslavia	
Triple jump	12.25 m	Vasilka Stojcevska	25 May 1991		Skopje, S.F.R. Yugoslavia	
Shot put	14.49 m	Vesna Chadikovska	8 July 2001		Trikala, Greece	
Discus throw	41.61 m	Mateja Efremovska	19 June 2016		Skopje, Republic of Macedonia	
Hammer throw	45.91 m	Vesna Chadikovska	6 May 2001		Columbus, United States	
Javelin throw	45.04 m	Vesna Chadikovska	21 May 1999		Mount Pleasant, United States	
Javelin throw	47.40 m (Old design)	Lydia Simovska	22 July 1979			
Heptathlon	5676 pts	Marina Mihajlova	23–24 September 1987	Mediterranean Games	Latakia, Syria	
Heptathlon	100m H (wind) / High jump / Shot put / 200m (wind) / Long jump (wind) / Javelin / 800m; 14.49 / 1.72 m / 11.47 m / 25.40 / 6.03 m / 40.62 m / 2:16.42					
20 km walk (road)						
4 × 100 m relay	47.97	Macedonia; Aleksandra Vojneska; Verica Dimitrovska; A. Matevska; B. Jovanovska	7 July 2001		Trikala, Greece	
4 × 200 m relay	1:50.84	Dimitroska; Zvetanoska; Miroska; Sekuloska	15 September 2013		Skopje, Republic of Macedonia	
4 × 400 m relay	3:54.61	Macedonia; Ivana Josifovska; K. Dudic; A. Matevska; V. Blazevska	15 September 2002		Istanbul, Turkey	
Swedish relay	2:24.16	Мitreska; Тrendaviloska; F. Risteska; C. Risteska	22 August 2009		Skopje, Republic of Macedonia	

=== Mixed ===
Event	Record	Athlete	Date	Meet	Place	Ref.
4 × 400 m relay	3:40.64	North Macedonia; Mihail Petrov; Ana Bozinovska; Jovan Stojoski; Sara Osmanovska	22 June 2023	European Team Championships	Chorzów, Poland	

== Indoor ==
=== Men ===
Event	Record	Athlete	Date	Meet	Place	Ref.
50 m	6.09	Riste Pandev	11 January 2014		Wettingen, Switzerland	
60 m	6.86	Riste Pandev	16 February 2013		Magglingen, Switzerland	
60 m	6.8 h	Zoran Tacevski	29 January 1969		Sofia, Bulgaria	
200 m	21.56	Jovan Stojoski	26 December 2021	New Year Rallye	Belgrade, Serbia	
400 m	47.49	Ismail Macev	1987		Budapest, Hungary	
400 m	47.35	Ismail Macev	7 February 1987		Budapest, Hungary	
400 m	47.18	Jovan Stojoski	20 February 2022		Budapest, Hungary	
800 m	1:49.36	Vančo Stojanov	2 February 2003		Sofia, Bulgaria	
1500 m	3:44.98	Dario Ivanovski	31 January 2021		Belgrade, Serbia	
3000 m	7:58.48 (Note: outdoor mark ratified as absolute record)	Dario Ivanovski	5 March 2022	Balkan Championships	Istanbul, Turkey	
60 m hurdles	8.39	Ognen Stefanovski	25 January 2026	Serbian Combined Events Championships	Belgrade, Serbia	
High jump	2.05 m	Blagojce Blazevski	4 February 1995		Sofia, Bulgaria	
High jump	2.05 m	Redzhep Selman	12 February 2005		Sofia, Bulgaria	
Pole vault	4.20 m	Ognen Stefanovski	22 February 2026	Slovenian Combined Events Championships	Novo Mesto, Slovenia	
Long jump	7.79 m (Note: Indoor best; outdoor mark ratified as absolute record)	Andreas Trajkovski	10 February 2024	Balkan Championships	Istanbul, Turkey	
Triple jump	15.16 m	Branko Stojanovski	18 February 1974		Sofia, Bulgaria	
Shot put	15.24 m	Dejan Angelovski	28 February 2004	Athina	Athens, Greece	
Heptathlon	5223 pts	Ognen Stefanovski	21–22 February 2026	Slovenian Combined Events Championships	Novo Mesto, Slovenia	
Heptathlon	60m / Long jump / Shot put / High jump / 60m H / Pole vault / 1000m; 7.22 / 6.84 / 11.76 m / 1.83 m / 8.41 / 4.20 m / 2:42.83					
5000 m walk						
4 × 400 m relay	3:31.61	Macedonia; Aleksandar Taheski; Gjorgi Kuzmonovski; Slave Koevski; Aleksandar Stojanovski	21 February 2015	Balkan Championships	Istanbul, Turkey	

=== Women ===
Event	Record	Athlete	Date	Meet	Place	Ref.
60 m	7.71	Marina Mihajlova-Damcevska	11 February 1995		Sofia, Bulgaria	
60 m	7.3 h	Vera Veljanovska	9 February 1974		Bucharest, Romania	
200 m	25.24 (Note: ratified by AFM, but not recognised by World Athletics)	Marina Mihajlova-Damcevska	4 February 1974		Sofia, Bulgaria	
200 m	25.42 (Note: by World Athletics source)	Marina Mihajlova-Damcevska	4 February 1995		Sofia, Bulgaria	
400 m	55.84	Drita Islami	4 February 2023		Budapest, Hungary	
800 m	2:13.16 (Note: by World Athletics source, 2:13.2 h by AFM source)	Marina Mihajlova-Damcevska	21 February 1988		Sofia, Bulgaria	
1500 m	4:34.02 (Note: by World Athletics source, 2:34.0 h by AFM source)	Daniela Kuleska	29 January 2000		Sofia, Bulgaria	
3000 m	10:06.55 (Note: by World Athletics source, 10:06.6 h by AFM source)	Daniela Kuleska	4 March 2003		Athens, Greece	
3000 m	10:02.16	Daniela Kuleska	8 February 2004		Sofia, Bulgaria	
60 m hurdles	8.40 (Note: by World Athletics source, 8.4 h by AFM source)	Marina Mihajlova-Damcevska	4 February 1995		Sofia, Bulgaria	
High jump	1.67 m	Irena Temova	21 January 2011		Sofia, Bulgaria	
High jump	1.70 m	Irena Temova	28 January 2007		Sofia, Bulgaria	
Pole vault						
Long jump	5.74 m	Marina Mihajlova-Damcevska	23 January 1986		Celje, S.F.R. Yugoslavia	
Triple jump						
Shot put	14.33 m	Vesna Chadikovska	26 January 2002		Ann Arbor, United States	
Pentathlon	3815 pts	Marina Mihajlova-Damcevska	28 February 1988		Sofia, Bulgaria	
Pentathlon	60m H / High jump / Shot put / Long jump / 800m; 9.33 / 1.65 m / 11.51 m / 5.73 m / 2:23.16					
3000 m walk						
4 × 400 m relay						
