= Silesia 2021 =

Silesia 2021 may refer to:

- 2021 World Athletics Relays, athletics competition held in Silesia from 1 to 2 May 2021
- 2021 European Team Championships, athletics competition which will be held in Silesia from 29 to 30 May 2021
