= Kralevo =

Kralevo may refer to:

- Kralevo, Haskovo Province, a village in the Stambolovo Municipality, Haskovo Province, Bulgaria
- Kralevo, Targovishte Province, a village in the Targovishte Municipality, Targovishte Province, Bulgaria

== See also ==
- Kraljevo (disambiguation)
