= SportsAid =

British charitable organization

SportsAid is a charity that helps English and Welsh aspiring athletes, typically 12-18 whose parents are their only other means of support. The charity helps these athletes by giving them cash awards to help them meet the cost of training and competing.

== Overview ==
In a typical year more than 1,500 sporting prospects receive SportsAid Awards of around £1,000 funded by the charity's partners, donors and supporters. These include Lloyds TSB, Asda, Eversheds, Hogarth, Founded and the Jaguar Academy of Sport.

At the London 2012 Olympic and Paralympic Games two-thirds of the British athletes were SportsAid alumni, winning 20 Olympic and 27 Paralympic gold medals between them. Famous alumni include Sir Bradley Wiggins, Dame Sarah Storey, Sir Steve Redgrave, David Weir CBE, Sir Chris Hoy, Baroness Grey-Thompson and Sir Ben Ainslie.

London 2012 generated a lot of support for SportsAid's work and to maintain this in 2013 the charity launched a new campaign called "I Will". This campaign is led by a film directed by Morgan Hutchins and produced by Hogarth and Founded which is available on YouTube. Called "I Will Be Next", it features ten SportsAid athletes with big aspirations.

Once a year SportsAid holds its One-to-Watch Award at its annual SportsBall in London. Previous winners include Tom Daley, Team GB hockey player Harry Martin, sprinter Sally Brown and gymnast Courtney Tulloch. SportsAid is registered in England and Wales as charity 1111612. Catherine, Princess of Wales, has been patron of the charity since April 2013. Retired sprinter Yasmin Liverpool is a member of the National Awards Committee.

There is a connected but wholly separate charity for Scotland, Scottish Sports Aid.

== See also ==
- Talented Athlete Scholarship Scheme
