= Kraljevo (disambiguation) =

Kraljevo may refer to:

- Kraljevo, a city in the Raška District, Serbia
- Kraljevo (Aleksinac), a village in the Aleksinac Municipality, Nišava District, Serbia
- Kraljevo Polje, a village in the Han Pijesak Municipality, Republika Srpska, Bosnia and Herzegovina
- Kraljevo Selo, a village in the Bosiljevo Municipality, Karlovac County, Croatia
- Kraljevo (film), a Yugoslav film from 1981

== See also ==
- Kralevo (disambiguation)
