= Aleksandra Vojnevska =

Sprinter and sports executive from North Macedonia

Personal information
- Nationality: Macedonian
- Born: 2 May 1981 (age 44)

Sport
- Sport: Sprinting
- Event: 100 metres

Aleksandra Vojnevska is a sprinter from North Macedonia born on 2 May 1981. She competed in the women's 100 meters at the 2004 Summer Olympics. She was one among the top 30 participants in women's 60 meters event at the 2002 European Athletics Indoor Championships.

Aleksandra Vojnevska is the president of the Athletic Federation of North Macedonia.
