= Daniela Kuleska =

Macedonian middle-distance runner (born 1981)

Personal information
- Nationality: Macedonian
- Born: 13 April 1981 (age 45)

Sport
- Sport: Middle-distance running
- Event: 1500 metres

Daniela Kuleska (born 13 April 1981) is a Macedonian middle-distance runner. She competed in the women's 1500 metres at the 2000 Summer Olympics.
