= Jovan Stojoski =

Serbian sprinter

Jovan Stojoski (Јован Стојоски; born 26 November 1997) is a Macedonian sprinter who represents Macedonia since 2019. Stojoski participated in the 2020 Olympic Games Tokyo.

== Biography ==
Stojoski is a national record holder on 13 discipline: 200m outdoor, 400m hurdles, 200m indoor, 400m indoor, 400m U23 outdoor, 400m U23 indoor, 300m outdoor, 4x100m, 4x400m, Swedish relay, 4x400m... He won two events, 100 m and 200 m, at the 2019 European Team Championships, in Skopje.

He reached the final at the 2019 European Athletics U23 Championships – Men's 400 metres in Gävle, Sweden (6th place). He represented his country at the 2019 World Athletics Championships in Doha. He was a member of AK Crvena zvezda between 2011-2018. Since 2018. he is a member of AK Ohrid.

In 2021, he is selected by World Athletics to represent North Macedonia to 2020 Summer Olympics, by Universality place on Men's 400 metres event.

== Personal Records ==
Outdoor:

- 100 m - 10,59 (-0,9 m/s) Bar | May 1, 2022
- 200 m - 21,32 NR (+0,1 m/s) Sarajevo | Jun 30, 2019
- 300 m - 33,83 NR Skopje | Oct 3, 2020
- 400 m - 46,81 Tokyo | Aug 1, 2021
- 400 m Hurdles - 51,58 NR Skopje | Jun 27, 2026
- 4x100 m - 40,89 NR Maribor | Jun 24, 2025
- 4x400 m Mixed - 3:40,64 NR Chorzów | Jun 22, 2023

Indoor:

- 60m - 6,97 Belgrade | Jan 23, 2022
- 200m - 21,56 NR Belgrade | Dec 26, 2021
- 400m - 47,18 NR Budapest | Feb 20, 2022

== Career highlights ==
2016

- Balkan U20 Championship - Bolu/Turkey 400m (6th place)
- Balkan U20 Championship - Bolu/Turkey 4x400m (Bronze medal)

2018

- European Champion Clubs Cup - Tampere/Finland 4x400 DQ

2019

- World Athletics Championship - Doha/Qatar - 400m (38th place)
- European U23 Championship - Gävle/Sweden 400m (6th place)
- European Team Championship 3rd League - Skopje/Macedonia 100m (Gold medal)
- European Team Championship 3rd League - Skopje/Macedonia 200m (Gold medal)
- European Team Championship 3rd League - Skopje/Macedonia 400m (Bronze medal)
- Balkan Senior Championship - Pravets/Bulgaria 400m (4th place)

2021

- The XXXII Olympic Games Tokyo 2020 - 400m (38th place)
- European Indoor Championship - Torun/Poland - 400m (48th place)
- Championship of the Small States of Europe - Serrvalle/San Marino - 100m (Bronze medal)
- Championship of the Small States of Europe - Serrvalle/San Marino - 400m (Bronze medal)
- European Team Championship 3rd League - Limassol/Cyprus 100m (4th place)
- European Team Championship 3rd League - Limassol/Cyprus 200m (Bronze medal)
- European Team Championship 3rd League - Limassol/Cyprus 400m (Silver medal)

2022

- World Athletics Indoor Championship - Belgrade/Serbia - 400m (21st place)
- XIX Mediterranean Games - Oran/Algeria - 400m (12th place)
- Championship of the Small States of Europe - Marsa/Malta - 400m (Bronze medal)
- Championship of the Small States of Europe - Marsa/Malta - 100m (5th place)

2023

- European Team Championship Division 3 - Silesia/Poland - 400m (5th place)
- European Team Championship Division 3 - Silesia/Poland - 4x100m (5th place)
- European Team Championship Division 3 - Silesia/Poland - 200m (8th place)

2025

- European Team Championship - Maribor - Silver medal 4x100m
- European Team Championship - Maribor - 5th place - 400m Hurdles

2026

- World Indoor Championship - Poland - 24th place - 400m
- European Challenger Championship - Monaco - Bronze medal - 400m Hurdles
