= Yasmin Liverpool =

British athlete

Yasmin Liverpool (born 15 January 1999) is a former British 200m and 400m sprinter. She retired from athletics in 2024 and now volunteers for her former benefactor SportsAid, alongside her career in Responsible AI.

== Early life ==
Yasmin is British and of Ghanaian, Lebanese and Dominican descent. Yasmin is the sister of Layal Liverpool, science journalist and author of 'Systemic: How Racism is Making Us Ill'. She is the granddaughter of Cecilia Koranteng-Addow, who was a High Court judge in Ghana from 1975 until her abduction and murder on 30 June 1982, during the second military rule of Jerry Rawlings. Her grandfather was Nicholas Liverpool, who served as the sixth President of Dominica from 2 October 2003 to 17 September 2012.

Yasmin was raised in the Netherlands where she started her athletics career, competing at national and international races for her club Leiden Athletics.

She moved to the United Kingdom to pursue a degree in Economics from the University of Warwick, where she continued her athletics career alongside a career in Data & Responsible AI.

== Athletics ==
Yasmin first ran for Great Britain in 2019. She went on to compete in World, European and National championships in the 400m sprint / 4x400m relay, winning several medals for Great Britain, securing New Balance sponsorship in 2021.

Yasmin's career highlights include being English 400m Champion (2019), setting a British Record to win the European Team Championships mixed 4x400m (2019), and being a member of the 4x400m women's relay team at the 2021 World Athletics Relay championships.

She retired from elite level athletics in 2024. Since her retirement, Yasmin volunteers on the National Awards Committee of SportsAid.
