= Irene van der Reijken =

Dutch athlete (born 1993)

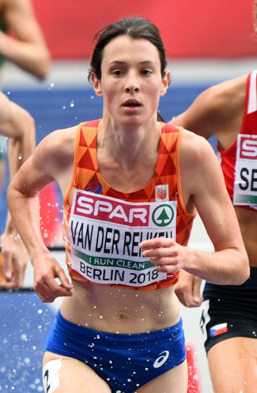
- Van der Reijken in 2018

Personal information
- Nationality: Dutch
- Born: 13 August 1993 (age 32) Rotterdam, Netherlands

Sport
- Sport: Athletics
- Event: 3000 metres steeplechase

Irene van der Reijken (born 13 August 1993) is a Dutch track and field athlete who specializes in the 3000 metres steeplechase.

On 3 June 2021 she set her current personal best in the 3000 metres steeplechase of 9:27.38 during the 2021 Meeting Iberoamericano de Atletismo, which qualified her for the 2020 Summer Olympics.

== Personal Bests ==
=== Outdoor ===
- 3000 meter steeplechase - 9:27.38 (Huelva 4 June 2021) "NR"
