= Athletic Federation of North Macedonia =

Sports governing body in North Macedonia

- Атлетска Федерација на Северна Македонија
- Sport: Athletics
- Abbreviation: AFNM
- Founded: 1920, refounded in 1993
- Affiliation: World Athletics
- Regional affiliation: European Athletic Association (EAA)
- Headquarters: Skopje, North Macedonia
- President: Aleksandra Vojnevska
- Secretary: Dejan Angelovski

Official website
- www.afm.org.mk
- (North Macedonia)

The Athletic Federation of North Macedonia (Macedonian: Атлетска Федерација на Северна Македонија) is the governing body for the sport of athletics in North Macedonia.

== Affiliations ==
- World Athletics
- European Athletic Association (EAA)
- Olympic Committee of North Macedonia (MOC)

== National records ==
AFM maintains the Macedonian records in athletics.
