= Macedonia at the 2010 European Athletics Championships =

Sporting event delegation

Macedonia was represented by 2 athletes at the 2010 European Athletics Championships held in Barcelona, Spain.

== Participants ==
Event	Men	Women
100 m		Ivana Rozman
Triple Jump	Redjep Selman	

== Results ==
2010 Barcelona	Gold	Silver	Bronze	Total
Macedonia (Macedonia)	0	0	0	0
