= Macedonia at the 2012 European Athletics Championships =

Macedonia competed at the 2012 European Athletics Championships held in Helsinki, Finland, between 27 June to 1 July 2012. 2 competitors, 1 man and 1 woman took part in 2 events.

== Results ==
=== Men ===
Track events

Event	Athletes	Heat		Semifinal		Final	
Event	Athletes	Result	Rank	Result	Rank	Result	Rank
400 m	Kristijan Efremov	48.80	29	did not advance			

=== Women ===
Track events

Event	Athletes	Heat		Semifinal		Final	
Event	Athletes	Result	Rank	Result	Rank	Result	Rank
100 m	Ivana Rožman	12.86	31	did not advance			
