= Drita Islami =

Hurdler from North Macedonia

Personal information
- Born: 1 August 1996 (age 29) Saraj, North Macedonia

Drita Islami (born 1 August 1996) is a Macedonian hurdler of Albanian descent. She competed at the 2016 Summer Olympics in the women's 400 metres hurdles race; her time of 1:01.18 in the heats did not qualify her for the semifinals.

Drita Islami holds the Macedonian record in the 400 metres hurdles. Her surname Islami shows her family are Muslim.
