= Dario Ivanovski =

Macedonian long-distance runner

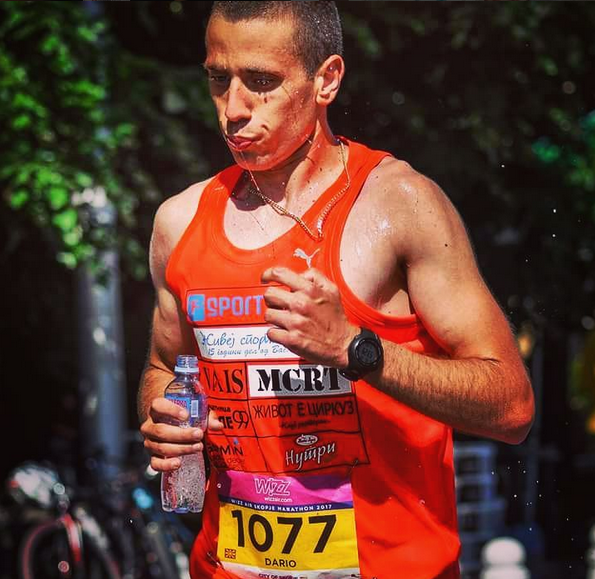
- Ivanovski in the 2017 Skopje Half Marathon

Personal information
- Nationality: North Macedonia
- Born: 15 May 1997 (age 29) Skopje, Macedonia
- Height: 1.78 m (5 ft 10 in)

Sport
- Sport: Track, long-distance running
- Events: 1500 meters; Half marathon
- Club: AK Skopski Maroton

Achievements and titles
- Personal bests: 1500m: 3:44.98; 5000 meters: 13:54.58; half marathon: 1:04:01; marathon: 2:08:26
- Updated on June 11, 2024

Dario Ivanovski (Macedonian: Дарио Ивановски) (born 15 May 1997) is a Macedonian long-distance runner who runs for AK Skopski Maraton and the Macedonian national team.

== Running career ==
Ivanovski won the 3000 meters at a meet in Elbasan in 2016.

In 2017, he won the half marathon race that was part of the Skopje Marathon with a time of 1:11:26. On April 22, 2017, he won the Belgrade Half Marathon in a time of 1:10:00.

He also set the national record in the 3000 meters at a meet in Novi Sad.

Ivanovski competed in the 1500 metres at the 2018 IAAF World Indoor Championships. On April 21, 2018, he won the Belgrade Half Marathon for the second year in a row, this time recording a new personal best time of 1:08:03.

== See also ==
- List of Macedonian records in athletics
