= Italy at the World Athletics Relays =

Italy team at athletics event

- WA code: ITA
- National federation: FIDAL
- Website: www.fidal.it
- Medals Ranked 6th: Gold 3 Silver 0 Bronze 1 Total 4

World Athletics Relays appearances (overview)
- 2014; 2015; 2017; 2019; 2021

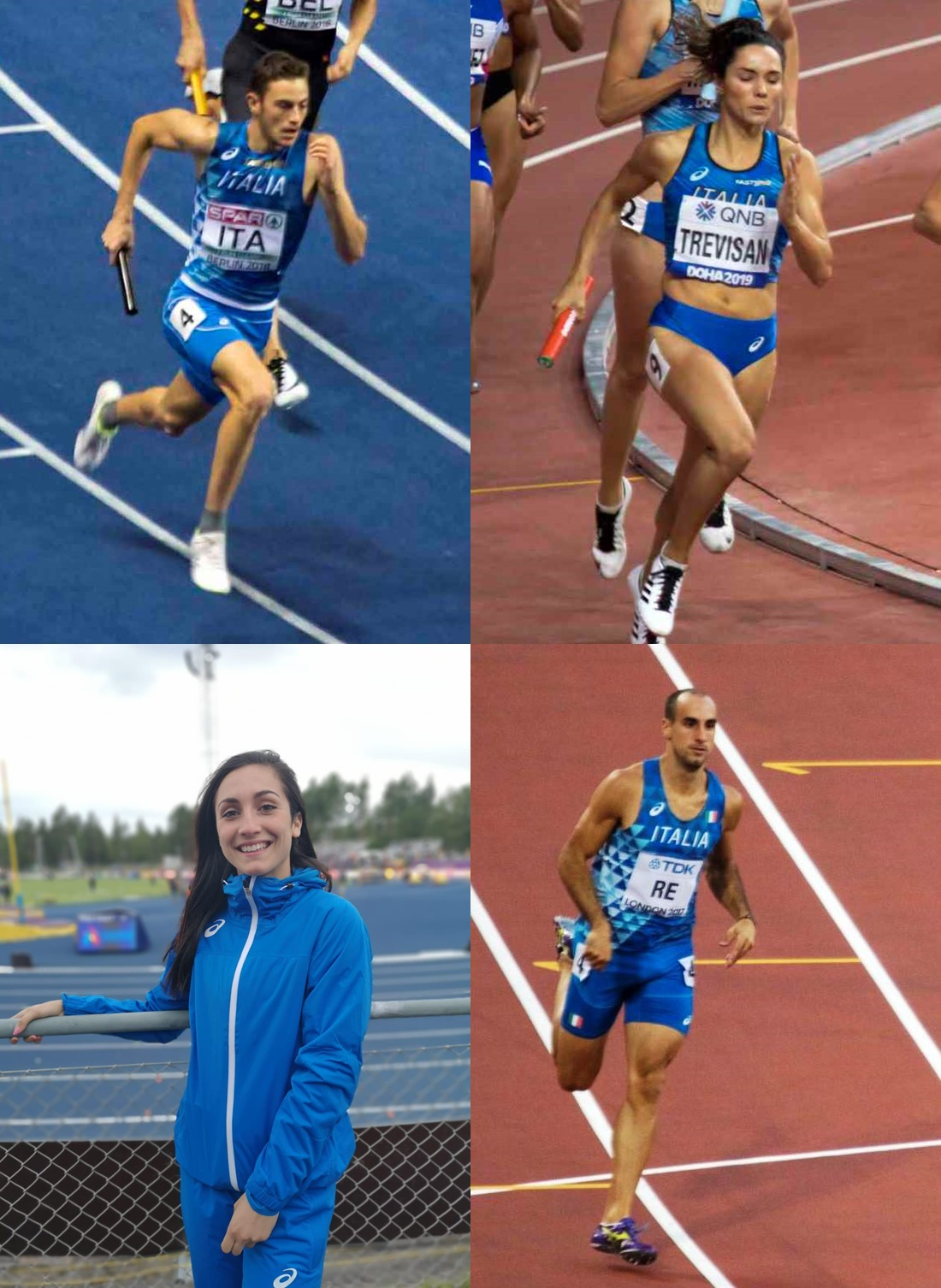
From the top left: Scotti, Trevisan, Mangione and Re, the four azzurri relay runners of the 4 × 400 m mixed relay winners of the first Italian gold medal in Silesia 21.

Italy has competed at the World Athletics Relays since first edition held in 2014, Italian teams have won a bronze medal in 2019.

== Medals ==
Edition	1st place, gold medalist(s)	2nd place, silver medalist(s)	3rd place, bronze medalist(s)	Event	Team
(The Bahamas) 2014 Nassau	0	0	0		
(The Bahamas) 2015 Nassau	0	0	0		
(The Bahamas) 2017 Nassau	0	0	0		
(Japan) 2019 Yokohama	0	0	1	Women's 4 × 400 m relay	Maria Benedicta Chigbolu; Ayomide Folorunso; Giancarla Trevisan; Raphaela Lukudo; Chiara Bazzoni; Elisabetta Vandi
(Poland) 2021 Silesia	3	0	0	Mixed 4 × 400 m relay	Edoardo Scotti; Giancarla Trevisan; Alice Mangione; Davide Re
(Poland) 2021 Silesia	3	0	0	Women's 4 × 100 m relay	Irene Siragusa; Gloria Hooper; Anna Bongiorni; Vittoria Fontana; Johanelis Herrera
(Poland) 2021 Silesia	3	0	0	Men's 4 × 100 m relay	Fausto Desalu; Marcell Jacobs; Davide Manenti; Filippo Tortu
(Poland) 2021 Chorzów	0	0	0		
(The Bahamas) 2025 Nassau	0	0	0		
	3	0	1		

== Nassau 2014 ==
Italy competed at the first edition of the World Athletics Relays (at what time still known as IAAF World Relays) in Nassau, Bahamas, from 24 to 25 May 2014.

=== Selected athletes ===
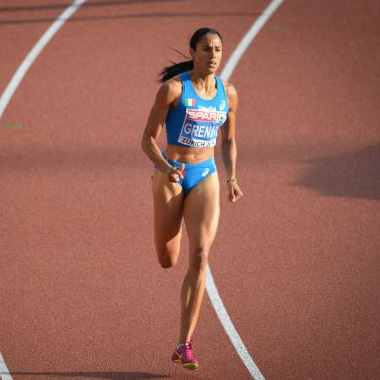
Libania Grenot.

In this first edition national relay team was made up of only the women's 4 × 400 m team, only five athletes.

Not employed

Athlete	Women's 4 × 400
Libania Grenot	x
Chiara Bazzoni	x
Maria Enrica Spacca	x
Elena Maria Bonfanti	x
Ylenia Vitale	x

=== Results ===
Event	Team	Round	Rank	Time	Notes
4 × 400 m relay	Chiara Bazzoni; Maria Enrica Spacca; Elena Maria Bonfanti; Libania Grenot	Heats	8th	3:30.67	SB
4 × 400 m relay	Chiara Bazzoni; Maria Enrica Spacca; Elena Maria Bonfanti; Libania Grenot	Final	6th	3:27.44	SB

== Nassau 2015 ==
Italy competed at the 2015 IAAF World Relays in Nassau, Bahamas, from 2 to 3 May 2015.

=== Selected athletes ===
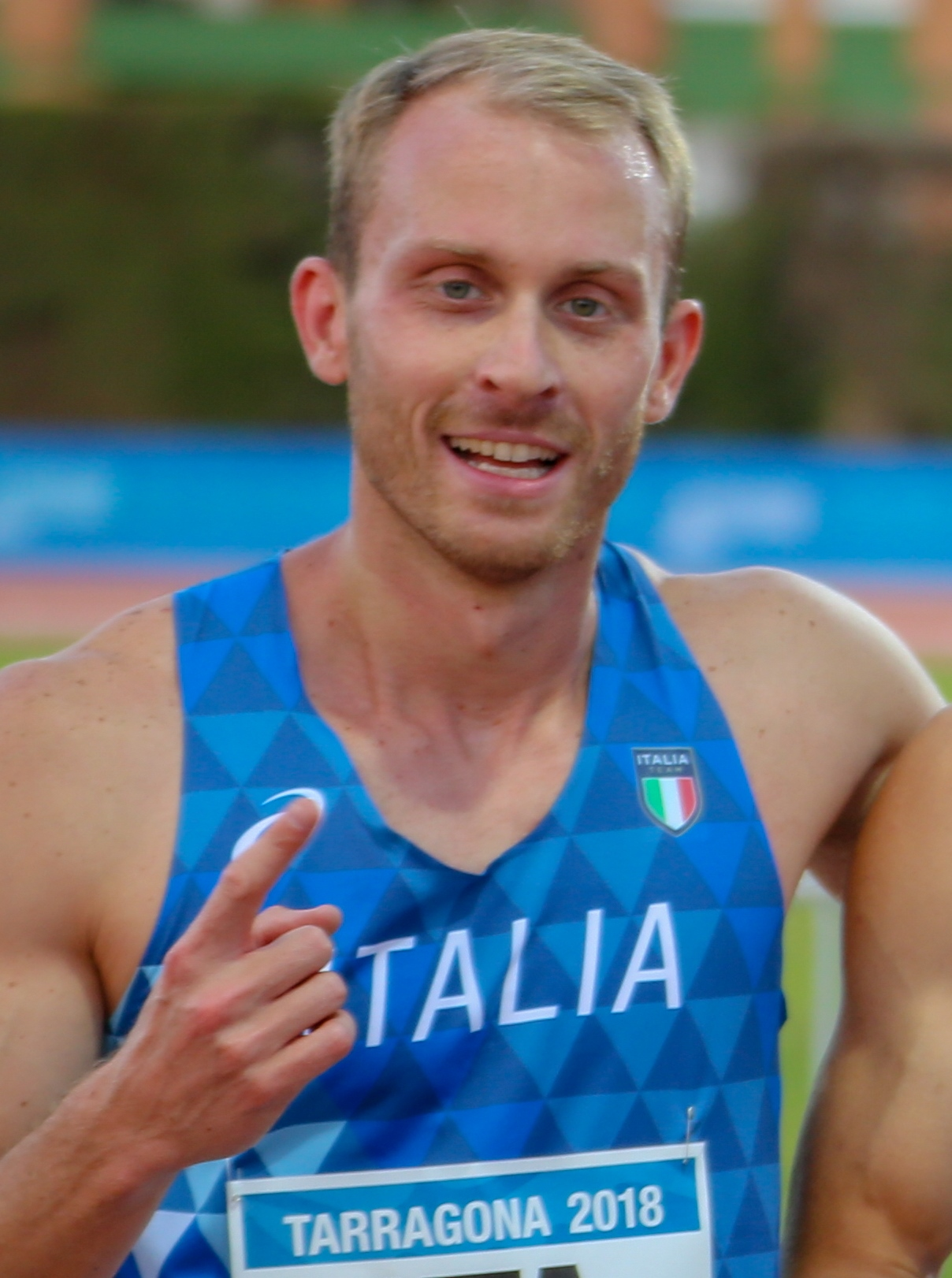
Matteo Galvan.

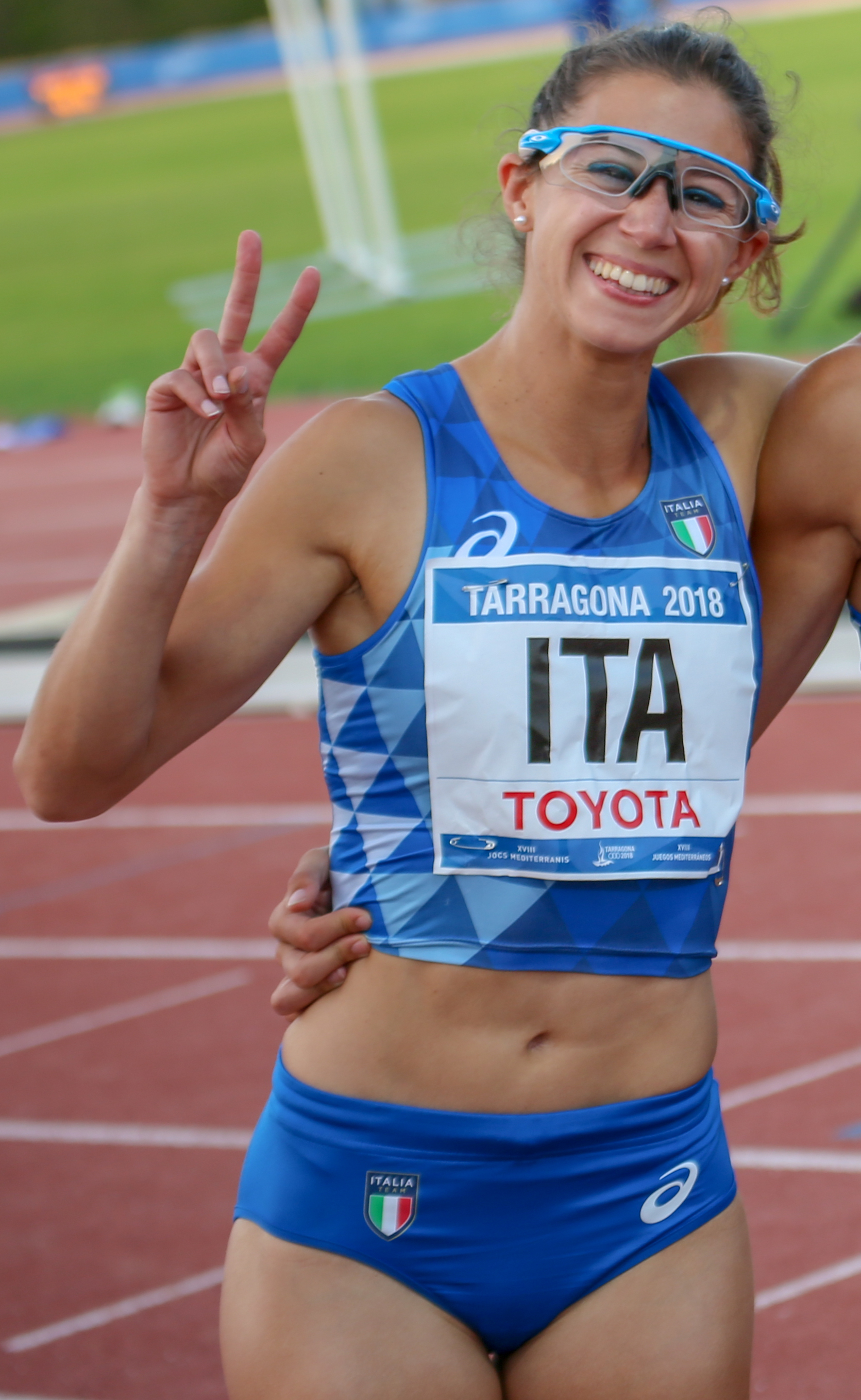
Irene Siragusa.

17 athletes, 6 men and 11 women, was selected for the event, for the composition of four teams: the 4 × 100 m men and women, the 4 × 400 m women. The 4 × 200 m men did not start.

Not employed

Athlete	Men's 4 × 100	Men's 4 × 200	Women's 4 × 100	Women's 4 × 400
Fabio Cerutti	x			
Fausto Desalu	x	x		
Diego Marani	x	x		
Delmas Obou	x	x		
Davide Re		x		
Giulia Riva			x	
Audrey Alloh			x	
Gloria Hooper			x	
Irene Siragusa			x	
Ilenia Draisci			x	
Libania Grenot				x
Chiara Bazzoni				x
Libania Grenot				x
Elena Maria Bonfanti				x
Maria Benedicta Chigbolu				x
Marta Milani				x

=== Results ===
==== Men ====
Event	Team	Round	Rank	Time	Notes
4 × 100 m relay	Fabio Cerutti; Fausto Desalu; Diego Marani; Delmas Obou	Heats	10th	38.84	SB
4 × 100 m relay	Fabio Cerutti; Eseosa Desalu; Matteo Galvan; Delmas Obou	Final B	5th	39.23	

==== Women ====
Event	Team	Round	Rank	Time	Notes
4 × 400 m relay	Chiara Bazzoni; Libania Grenot; Elena Maria Bonfanti; Maria Benedicta Chigbolu	Heats	DSQ	No time	(Note: Finishing the race without the baton.)
4 × 100 m relay	Giulia Riva; Gloria Hooper; Irene Siragusa; Audrey Alloh	Heats	DNF	No time	

== Nassau 2017 ==
Italy competed at the 2017 IAAF World Relays in Nassau, Bahamas, from 22 to 23 April 2017.

=== Selected athletes ===
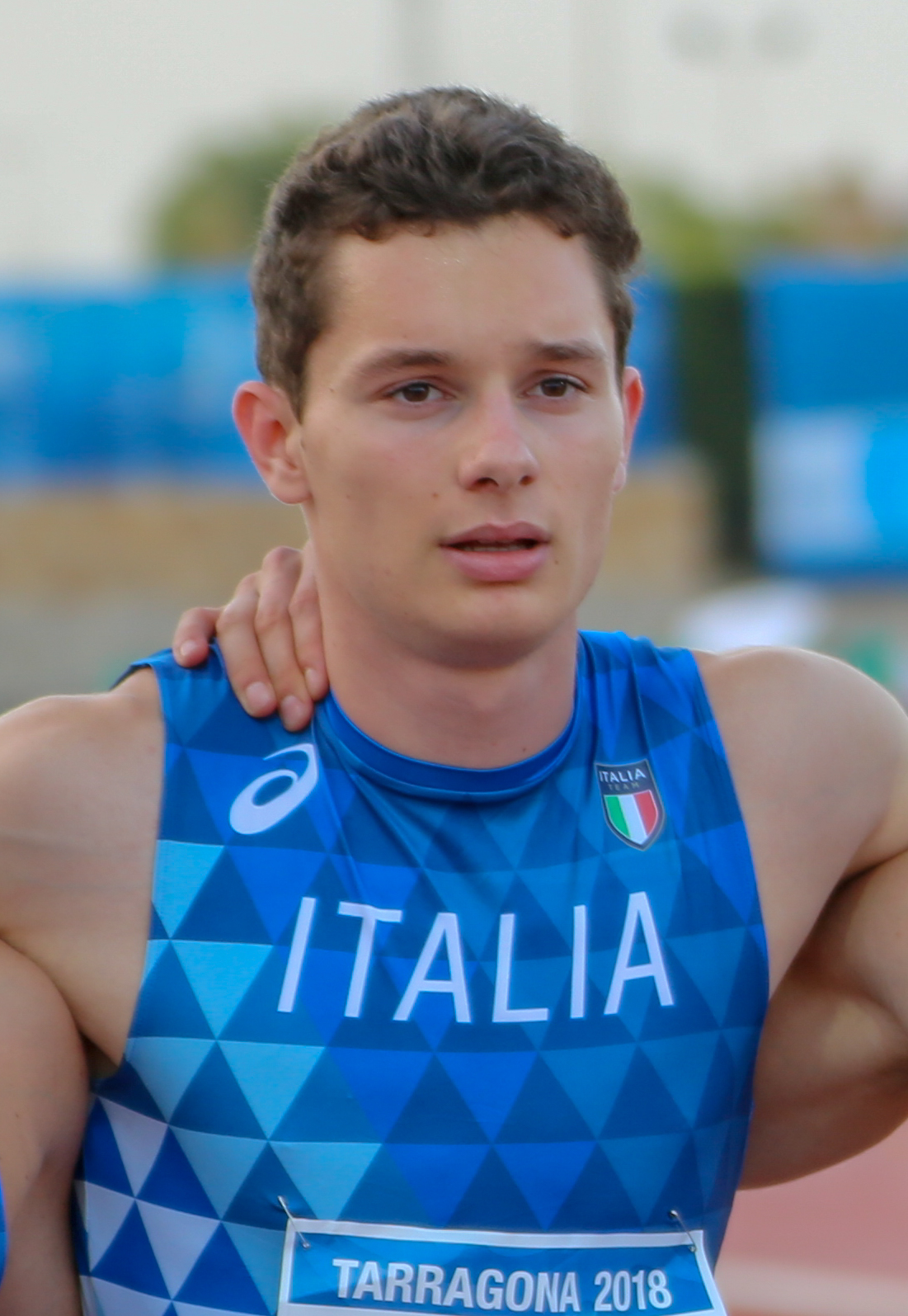
Filippo Tortu.

11 athletes, 6 men and 5 women, was selected for the event for the composition of two teams: the 4 × 100 m men and the 4 × 100 m women.

Not employed

Athlete	Men's 4 × 100	Women's 4 × 100
Federico Cattaneo	x	
Fabio Cerutti	x	
Fausto Desalu	x	
Marcell Jacobs	x	
Davide Manenti	x	
Filippo Tortu	x	
Audrey Alloh		x
Anna Bongiorni		x
Libania Grenot		x
Gloria Hooper		x
Irene Siragusa		x

=== Results ===
==== Men ====
Event	Team	Round	Rank	Time	Notes
4 × 100 m relay	Fabio Cerutti; Fausto Desalu; Federico Cattaneo; Filippo Tortu	Heats	DSQ	No time	(Note: Lane infringement.)

==== Women ====
Event	Team	Round	Rank	Time	Notes
4 × 100 m relay	Libania Grenot; Gloria Hooper; Anna Bongiorni; Audrey Alloh	Heats	DSQ	No time	

== Yokohama 2019 ==
Italy competed at the 2019 IAAF World Relays in Yokohama, Japan, from 11 to 19 May 2019, participating in five of the ten scheduled competitions.

=== Selected athletes ===
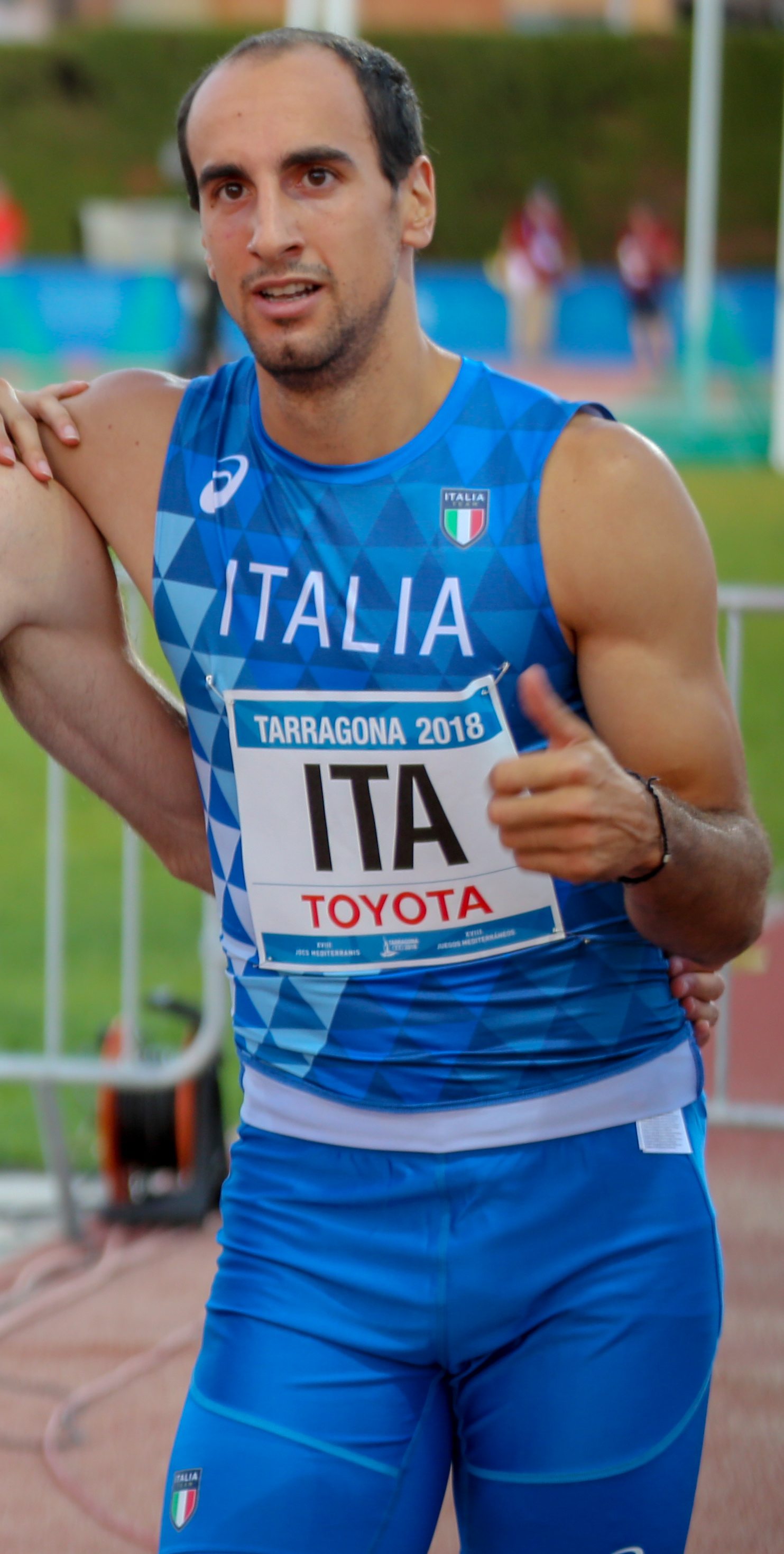
Davide Re set the national record with the mixed 4 × 400 m relay.

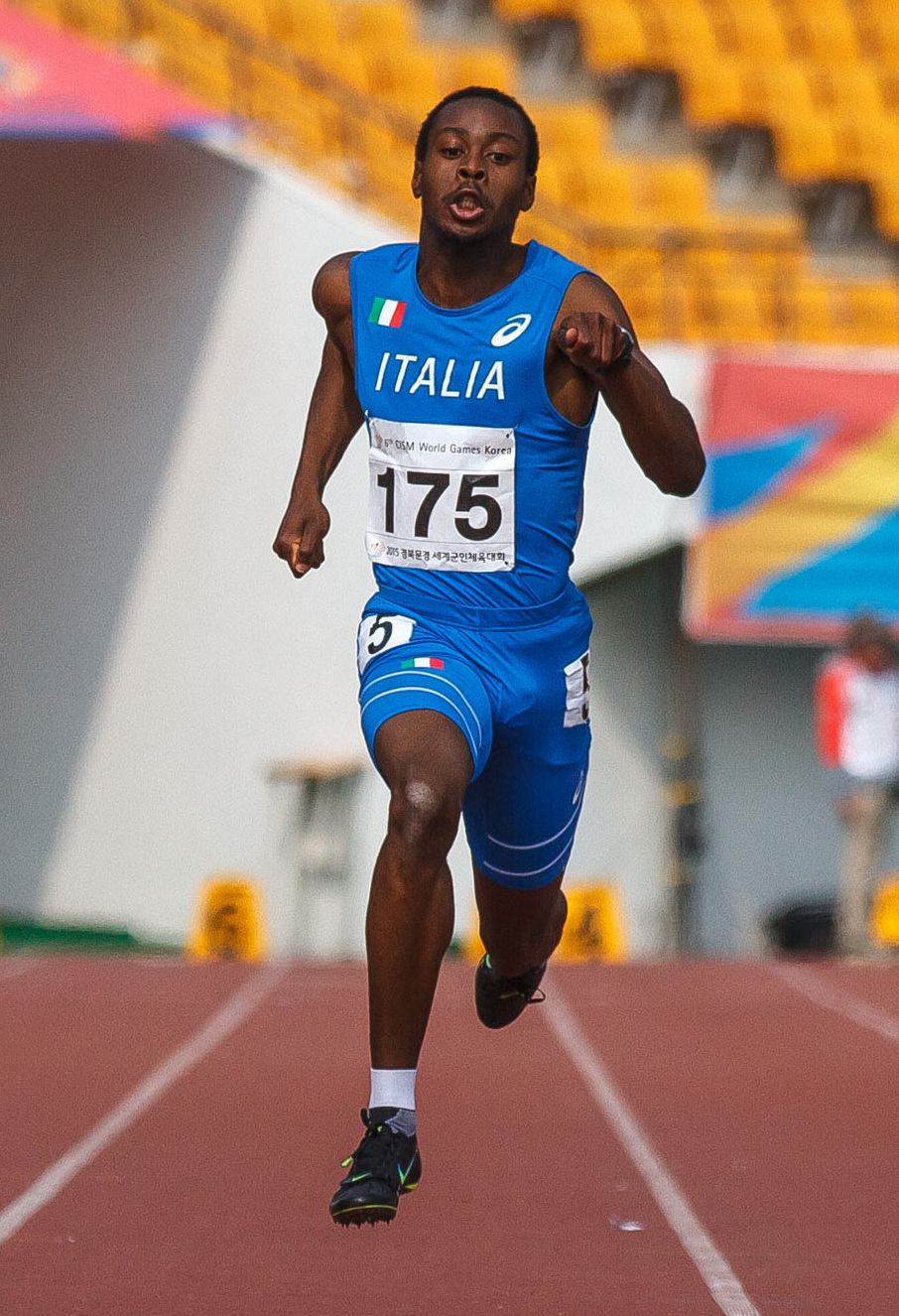
Faustino Desalu.

29 athletes, 14 men and 15 women, was selected for the event.

Not employed

Athlete	Men		Women	
Athlete	4 × 100	4 × 400/4 × 400 mixed	4 × 100	4 × 400/4 × 400 mixed
Federico Cattaneo	x			
Fausto Desalu	x			
Marcell Jacobs	x			
Davide Manenti	x			
Roberto Rigali	x			
Filippo Tortu	x			
Vladimir Aceti		x		
Daniele Corsa		x		
Andrew Howe		x		
Giuseppe Leonardi		x		
Davide Re		x		
Edoardo Scotti		x		
Alessandro Sibilio		x		
Michele Tricca		x		
Anna Bongiorni			x	
Zaynab Dosso			x	
Johanelis Herrera Abreu			x	
Gloria Hooper			x	
Alessia Pavese			x	
Irene Siragusa			x	
Chiara Bazzoni				x
Rebecca Borga				x
Maria Benedicta Chigbolu				x
Ayomide Folorunso				x
Raphaela Lukudo				x
Marta Milani				x
Giancarla Trevisan				x
Virginia Troiani				x
Elisabetta Vandi				x

=== Composition team and results ===
On 10 May 2019 Italian Athletics Federation announced the composition of the five national teams to the five competitions in which it will participate.

	Men's 4 × 100 metres relay	Women's 4 × 100 metres relay	Men's 4 × 400 metres relay	Women's 4 × 400 metres relay	Mixed 4 × 400 metres relay
Heats	Fausto Desalu; Marcell Jacobs; Davide Manenti; Filippo Tortu	Johanelis Herrera; Gloria Hooper; Anna Bongiorni; Irene Siragusa	Daniele Corsa; Michele Tricca; Edoardo Scotti; Alessandro Sibilio	Maria Benedicta Chigbolu; Ayomide Folorunso; Elisabetta Vandi; Chiara Bazzoni	Davide Re; Giancarla Trevisan; Andrew Howe; Raphaela Lukudo
Heats	advances to the final with the 3rd crono 38.29 SB (Note: Qualified for 2019 World Championships in Athletics.)	advances to the final with the 6th crono 43.40 SB	access to the final B with the 10th crono 3:03.97 SB	advances to the final with the 6th crono 3:29.08 SB	advances to the final with the 3rd crono 3:16.12 NR
Finals	Fausto Desalu; Marcell Jacobs; Davide Manenti; Filippo Tortu	Johanelis Herrera; Gloria Hooper; Anna Bongiorni; Irene Siragusa	Daniele Corsa; Michele Tricca; Edoardo Scotti; Davide Re	Maria Benedicta Chigbolu; Ayomide Folorunso; Giancarla Trevisan; Raphaela Lukudo	Giuseppe Leonardi; Virginia Troiani; Chiara Bazzoni; Alessandro Sibilio
Finals	DNF	5th 44.29	1st 3:02.87 SB	(bronze); 3:27.74 SB	4th 3:20.28

== Silesia 2021 ==
Italy competed at the 2021 World Athletics Relays in Silesia, Poland, from 1 to 2 May 2021, participating in five of the ten scheduled competitions.

=== Selected athletes ===
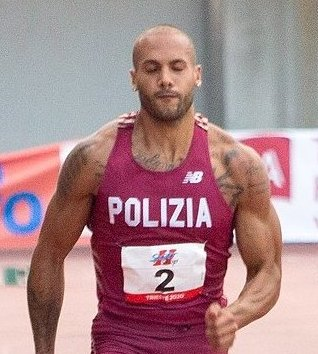
Marcell Jacobs the seasonal world leader of the 60-meter lists.

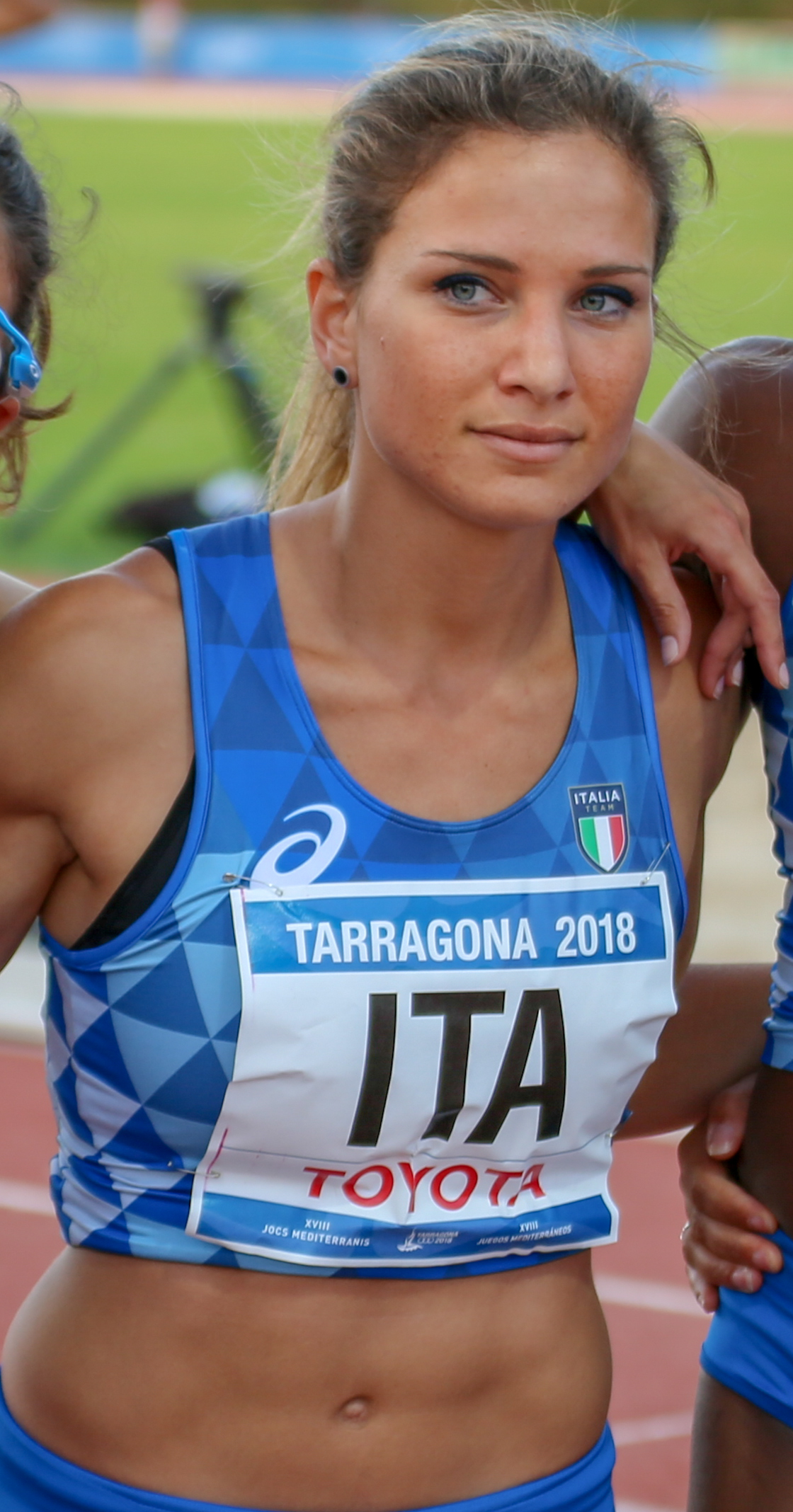
Anna Bongiorni.

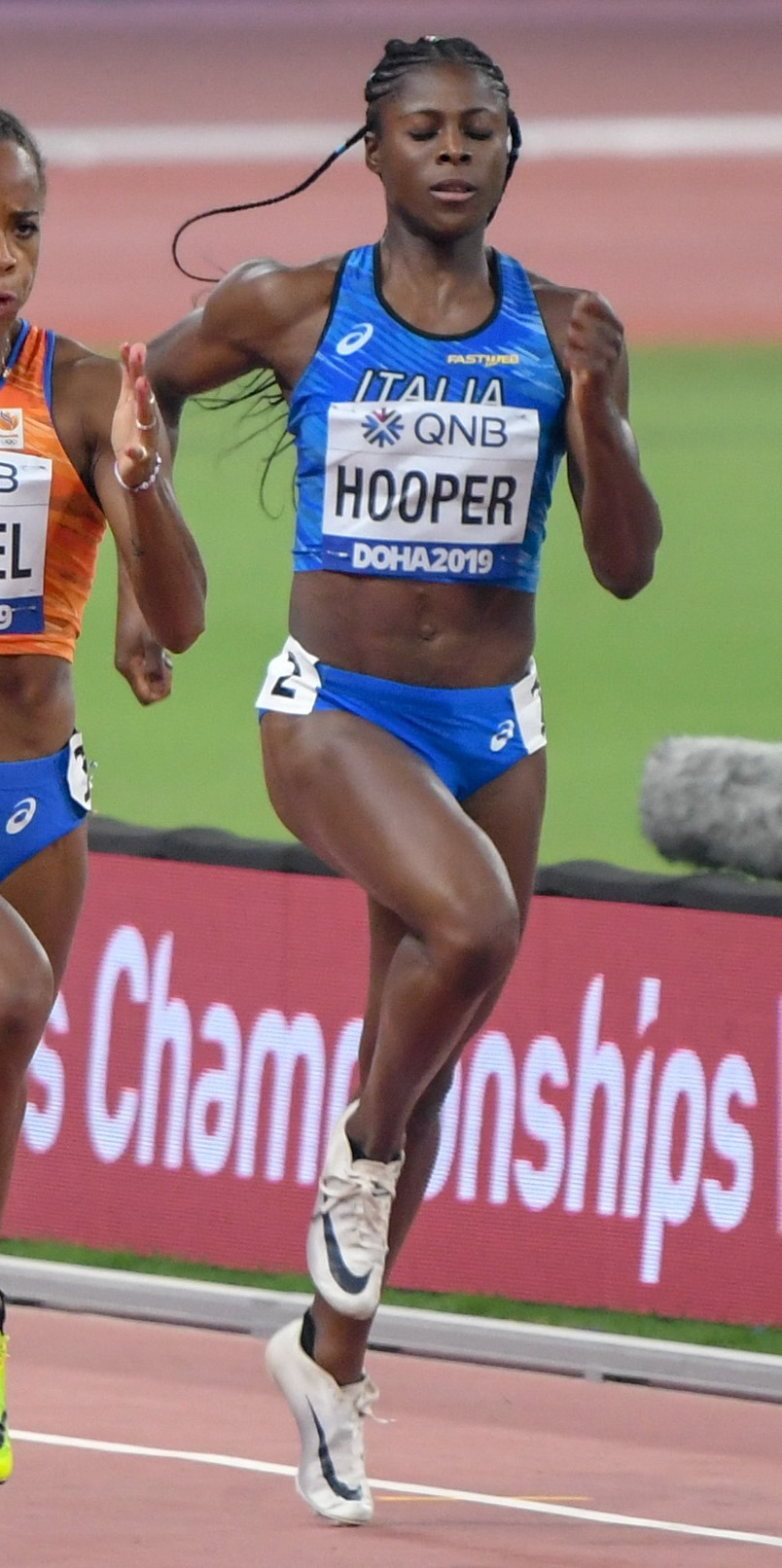
Gloria Hooper.

30 athletes, 16 men and 14 women, was selected for the event, but there were two forfais.

Not employed

Athlete	Men		Women	
Athlete	4 × 100	4 × 400/4 × 400 mixed	4 × 100	4 × 400/4 × 400 mixed
Marcell Jacobs	x			
Davide Manenti	x			
Federico Cattaneo	x			
Fausto Desalu	x			
Filippo Tortu	x			
Antonio Infantino	x			
Roberto Rigali	x			
Davide Re		x		
Vladimir Aceti		x		
Edoardo Scotti		x		
Alessandro Sibilio		x		
Brayan Lopez		x		
Lorenzo Benati		x		
Mattia Cesarico		x		
Irene Siragusa			x	
Anna Bongiorni			x	
Johanelis Herrera Abreu			x	
Gloria Hooper			x	
Vittoria Fontana			x	
Dalia Kaddari			x	
Chiara Melon			x	
~~Maria Benedicta Chigbolu~~				x
Ayomide Folorunso				x
Raphaela Lukudo				x
Giancarla Trevisan				x
Alice Mangione				x
~~Rebecca Borga~~				x
Eleonora Marchiando				x
Virginia Troiani				x
Petra Nardelli				x

=== Results ===
In the heats all five teams qualified for the final, the three who did not yet have the Olympic pass (Men's 4 × 100 m, Woman 4 × 400 m and Mixed 4 × 400 m), got it.

==== Men ====
Event	Team	Round	Rank	Time	Notes
4 × 100 m relay	Fausto Desalu; Marcell Jacobs; Davide Manenti; Filippo Tortu	Heats	1st Q	38.45	EL, SB, OG, WC
4 × 100 m relay	Fausto Desalu; Marcell Jacobs; Davide Manenti; Filippo Tortu	Final	1st	39.21	
4 × 400 m relay	Lorenzo Benati; Alessandro Sibilio; Brayan Lopez; Vladimir Aceti	Heats	8th Q	3:04.81	SB
4 × 400 m relay	Lorenzo Benati; Alessandro Sibilio; Brayan Lopez; Vladimir Aceti	Final	4th	3:05.11	

==== Women ====
Event	Team	Round	Rank	Time	Notes
4 × 100 m relay	Johanelis Herrera Abreu; Gloria Hooper; Anna Bongiorni; Irene Siragusa	Heats	6th Q	44.02	SB
4 × 100 m relay	Irene Siragusa; Gloria Hooper; Anna Bongiorni; Vittoria Fontana	Final	1st	43.79	SB
4 × 400 m relay	Raphaela Lukudo; Eleonora Marchiando; Petra Nardelli; Ayomide Folorunso	Heats	7th q	44.02	SB, OG, WC
4 × 400 m relay	Raphaela Lukudo; Eleonora Marchiando; Petra Nardelli; Ayomide Folorunso	Final	5th	3:32.69	

==== Mixed ====
Event	Team	Round	Rank	Time	Notes
4 × 400 m relay	Edoardo Scotti; Giancarla Trevisan; Alice Mangione; Davide Re	Heats	1st Q	3:16.52	WL, SB, OG, WC
4 × 400 m relay	Edoardo Scotti; Giancarla Trevisan; Alice Mangione; Davide Re	Filnal	1st	3:16.60	

== See also ==
- Italian national track relay team
