= Italy at the 2019 IAAF World Relays =

- WA code: ITA
- National federation: FIDAL
- Website: www.fidal.it

in (Japan) Yokohama
- Competitors: 29 (14 men, 15 women)
- Medals Ranked 13th: Gold 0 Silver 0 Bronze 1 Total 1

IAAF World Relays appearances
- 2014; 2015; 2017; 2019; 2021

Italy competed at the 2019 IAAF World Relays in Yokohama, Japan, from 11–19 May 2019.

== Selected athletes ==
29 athletes, 14 men and 15 women, was selected for the event.

=== Men ===
4x100

- Federico Cattaneo
- Eseosa Desalu
- Marcell Jacobs
- Davide Manenti
- Roberto Rigali
- Filippo Tortu

4x400/4x400 mixed

- Vladimir Aceti
- Daniele Corsa
- Andrew Howe
- Giuseppe Leonardi
- Davide Re
- Edoardo Scotti
- Alessandro Sibilio
- Michele Tricca

=== Women ===
4x100

- Anna Bongiorni
- Zaynab Dosso
- Johanelis Herrera Abreu
- Gloria Hooper
- Alessia Pavese
- Irene Siragusa

4x400/4x400 mixed

- Chiara Bazzoni
- Rebecca Borga
- Maria Benedicta Chigbolu
- Ayomide Folorunso
- Raphaela B. Lukudo
- Marta Milani
- Giancarla D. Trevisan
- Virginia Troiani
- Elisabetta Vandi

== Composition team and results ==
On 10 May 2019 Italian Athletics Federation announced the composition of the five national teams to the five competitions in which it will participate.

	Men's 4 × 100 metres relay	Women's 4 × 100 metres relay	Men's 4 × 400 metres relay	Women's 4 × 400 metres relay	Mixed 4 × 400 metres relay
Heats	Fausto Desalu; Marcell Jacobs; Davide Manenti; Filippo Tortu	Johanelis Herrera; Gloria Hooper; Anna Bongiorni; Irene Siragusa	Daniele Corsa; Michele Tricca; Edoardo Scotti; Alessandro Sibilio	Maria Benedicta Chigbolu; Ayomide Folorunso; Elisabetta Vandi; Chiara Bazzoni	Davide Re; Giancarla Trevisan; Andrew Howe; Raphaela Lukudo
Heats	advances to the final with the 3rd crono 38.29 SB	advances to the final with the 6th crono 43.40 SB	access to the final B with the 10th crono 3:03.97 SB	advances to the final with the 6th crono 3:29.08 SB	advances to the final with the 3rd crono 3:16.12 NR
Finals	Fausto Desalu; Marcell Jacobs; Davide Manenti; Filippo Tortu	Johanelis Herrera; Gloria Hooper; Anna Bongiorni; Irene Siragusa	Daniele Corsa; Michele Tricca; Edoardo Scotti; Davide Re	Maria Benedicta Chigbolu; Ayomide Folorunso; Giancarla Trevisan; Raphaela Lukudo	Giuseppe Leonardi; Virginia Troiani; Chiara Bazzoni; Alessandro Sibilio
Finals	DNF	5th 44.29	1st 3:02.87 SB	(bronze); 3:27.74 SB	4th 3:20.28

== See also ==
- Italian national track relay team
