= Italy at the 2021 World Athletics Relays =

- WA code: ITA
- National federation: FIDAL
- Website: www.fidal.it

in (Poland) Silesia
- Competitors: 28 (14 men, 14 women)
- Medals Ranked 2nd: Gold 2 Silver 1 Bronze 0 Total 3

World Athletics Relays appearances (overview)
- 2014; 2015; 2017; 2019; 2021

Italy competed at the 2021 World Athletics Relays in Silesia, Poland, from 1 to 2 May 2021.

== Medalists ==
Medal	Name	Event	Date
Gold	Edoardo Scotti; Giancarla Trevisan; Alice Mangione; Davide Re	Mixed 4 × 400 m relay	2 May
Gold	Irene Siragusa; Gloria Hooper; Anna Bongiorni; Vittoria Fontana; Johanelis Herrera	Women's 4 × 100 m relay	2 May
Silver	Fausto Desalu; Marcell Jacobs; Davide Manenti; Filippo Tortu	Men's 4 × 100 m relay	2 May

== Selected athletes ==
30 athletes, 14 men and 16 women, was selected for the event.

=== Men ===
4 × 100

- Marcell Jacobs
- Davide Manenti
- Federico Cattaneo
- Eseosa Desalu
- Filippo Tortu
- Antonio Infantino
- Roberto Rigali

4 × 400/4 × 400 mixed

- Davide Re (cap.)
- Vladimir Aceti
- Edoardo Scotti
- Alessandro Sibilio
- Brayan Lopez
- Lorenzo Benati
- Mattia Cesarico

=== Women ===
4 × 100

- Irene Siragusa
- Anna Bongiorni
- Johanelis Herrera Abreu
- Gloria Hooper (cap.)
- Vittoria Fontana
- Dalia Kaddari
- Chiara Melon

4 × 400/4 × 400 mixed

- ~~Maria Benedicta Chigbolu~~
- Ayomide Folorunso
- Raphaela Lukudo
- Giancarla Trevisan
- Alice Mangione
- ~~Rebecca Borga~~
- Eleonora Marchiando
- Virginia Troiani
- Petra Nardelli

== Results ==
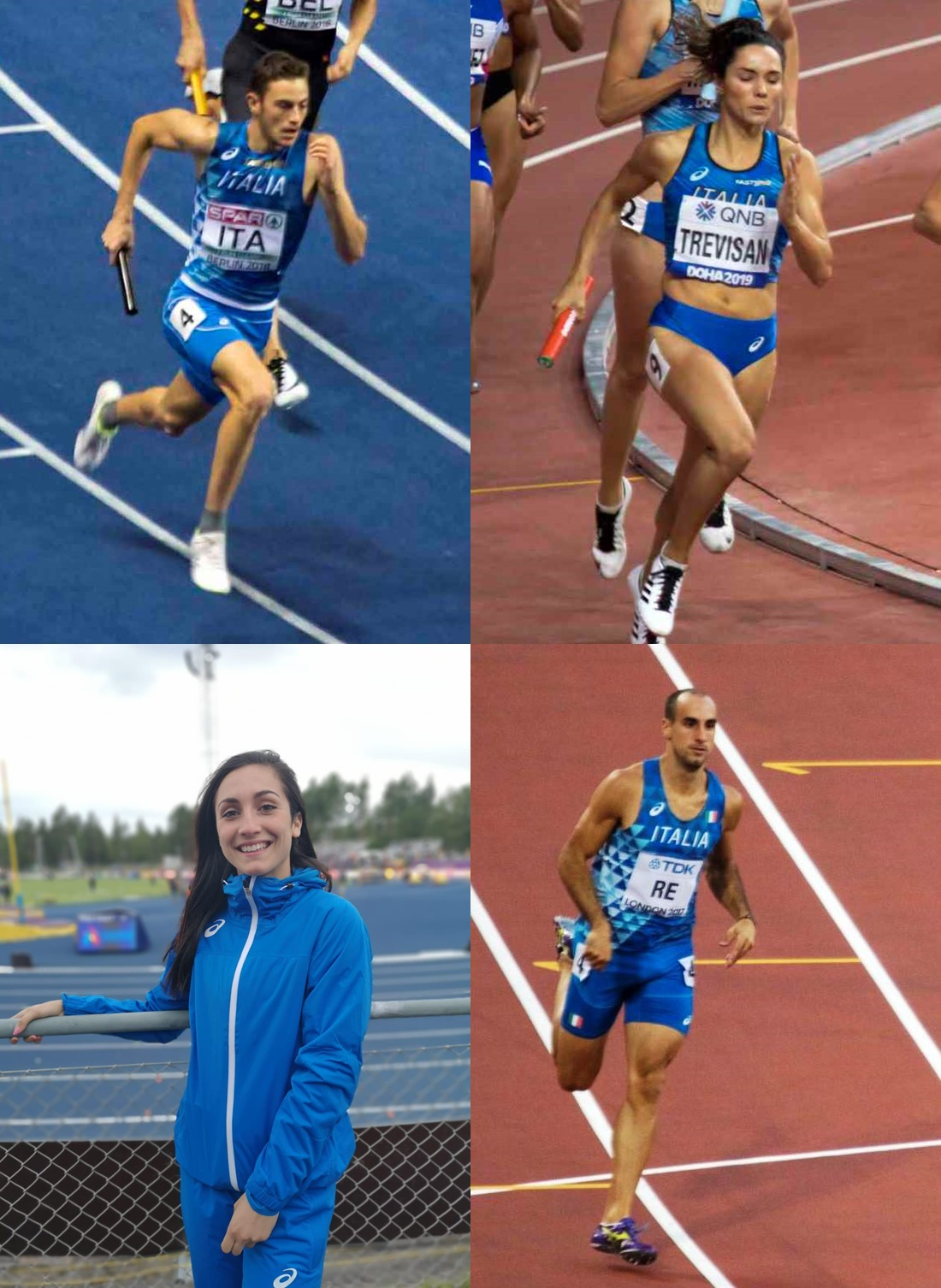
From the top left: Scotti, Trevisan, Mangione and Re, the four azzurri relay runners of the 4 × 400 m mixed relay in order of sport legs.

In the heats all five teams qualified for the final, the three who did not yet have the Olympic pass (Men's 4 × 100 m, Woman 4 × 400 m and Mixed 4 × 400 m), got it.

=== Men ===
Athlete	Event	Heat		Final	
Athlete	Event	Result	Rank	Result	Rank
Eseosa Desalu; Marcell Jacobs; Davide Manenti; Filippo Tortu	4 × 100 m relay	38.45 EL, SB, OG, WC	1 Q	39.21	2nd place, silver medalist(s)
Lorenzo Benati; Alessandro Sibilio; Brayan Lopez; Vladimir Aceti	4 × 400 m relay	3:04.81 SB	8 Q	3:05.11	4

=== Women ===
Athlete	Event	Heat		Final	
Athlete	Event	Result	Rank	Result	Rank
Johanelis Herrera Abreu; Gloria Hooper; Anna Bongiorni; Irene Siragusa; Vittoria Fontana	4 × 100 m relay	44.02 SB	6 Q	43.79 SB	1st place, gold medalist(s)
Raphaela Lukudo; Eleonora Marchiando; Petra Nardelli; Ayomide Folorunso	4 × 400 m relay	44.02 SB, OG, WC	7 q	3:32.69	5

=== Mixed ===
Athlete	Event	Heat		Final	
Athlete	Event	Result	Rank	Result	Rank
Edoardo Scotti; Giancarla Trevisan; Alice Mangione; Davide Re	4 × 400 m relay	3:16.52 WL, SB, OG, WC	1 Q	3:16.60	1st place, gold medalist(s)

== See also ==
- Italian national track relay team
