= 2018 Mediterranean Athletics U23 Championships =

III Mediterranean Athletics U23 Championships
- Dates: 9–10 June 2018
- Host city: Jesolo, Italy
- Events: 42
- Participation: 25 nations

The 2018 Mediterranean Athletics U23 Championships was an athletics competition which was held in Jesolo, Italy, from 9 to 10 June 2018. A total of 42 events were contested, of which 21 by male and 21 by female athletes. A total of 25 nations participated in the championships.

== Medal summary ==
=== Men ===
Event	Gold		Silver		Bronze	
100 metres (wind +1.1 m/s)	Amaury Golitin; France	10.07 CR	Frederico Curvelo; Portugal	10.37	Ryan Zeze; France	10.47
200 metres (wind +0.3 m/s)	Charles Renard; France	21.10	Thomas Manfredi; Italy	21.13	Simone Tanzilli; Italy	21.22
400 metres	Mohamed Fares Jlassi; Tunisia	45.55 CR	Daniele Corsa; Italy	45.79	Slimane Moula; Algeria	45.96
800 metres	Gabriel Tual; France	1:50.41	Riadh Chninni; Tunisia	1:50.56	Benjamin Robert; France	1:50.89
1500 metres	Iskander Jhinaoui; Tunisia	3:47.37 CR	Ignacio Fontes; Spain	3:48.29	Mohamed-Amine El Bouajaji; France	3:48.90
5000 metres	Jimmy Gressier; France	14:35.85	Tariku Novales; Spain	14:39.57	Ahmed Jaziri; Tunisia	14:42.97
10,000 metres	Alessandro Giacobazzi; Italy	30:18.10	Ahmed Ouhda; Italy	30:30.84	Sezgin Ataç; Turkey	31:04.51
110 m hurdles (wind +1.4 m/s)	Junior Effa Effa; France	13.97	Amine Bouanani; Algeria	14.01	Francesco Ferrante; Italy	14.02
400 m hurdles	Matteo Beria; Italy	50.52 CR	Wilfried Happio; France	50.65	Javier Delgado; Spain	50.82
3000 m steeplechase	Alexis Phelut; France	8:55.89	Mohamed Amin Jhinaoui; Tunisia	8:57.74	Ahmed Abdelwahed; Italy	9:00.01
4 × 100 m relay	France; Amaury Golitin; Ryan Zézé; Ismail Bedel; Charles Renard	39.72	Italy; Antonio Moro; Nicholas Artuso; Thomas Manfredi; Andrei Alexandru Zlatan	39.89	Algeria; Mahmoud Hammoudi; Amine Bouanani; Slimane Moula; Mohamed Mahdi Zekraoui	41.19
4 × 400 m relay	Italy; Mattia Casarico; Andrea Romani; Edoardo Scotti; Giuseppe Leonardi	3:05.07 CR	Tunisia; Alaeddine Kebsi; Hassan Abidi; Riadh Chninni; Mohamed Fares Jlassi	3:08.58	Spain; Oriol Madi; Darwin Echeverry; Adrian Rocandio; Manuel Guijarro	3:09.78
10,000 metres walk	Stefano Chiesa; Italy	41:09.10	Manuel Bermudez; Spain	41:14.24	Gianluca Pichiottino; Italy	42:16.60
High jump	Christian Falocchi; Italy	2.19 m CR	Stefano Sottile; Italy	2.19 m	Alperen Acet; Turkey	2.16 m
Pole vault	Alioune Sene; France	5.50 m	Thibaud Collet; France	5.40 m	Gonzalo Santamaria; Spain	5.30 m
Long jump	Filippo Randazzo; Italy	7.88 m	Gabriele Chilà; Italy	7.82 m	Daniel Solis; Spain	7.81 m
Triple jump	Quentin Mouyabi; France	16.72 m CR	Simone Forte; Italy	16.47 m	Can Ozupek; Turkey	16.39 m
Shot put	Leonardo Fabbri; Italy	19.40 m	Sebastiano Bianchetti; Italy	19.31 m	Anastasios Latifllari; Greece	18.90 m
Discus throw	Georgios Koniarakis; Cyprus	58.56 m	Martin Marković; Croatia	56.90 m	Edujose Lima; Portugal	55.98 m
Hammer throw	Yann Chaussinand; France	68.93 m	Giacomo Proserpio; Italy	66.97 m	Tiziano Di Blasio; Italy	64.28 m
Javelin throw	Manu Quijera; Spain	74.98 m	Emin Öncel; Turkey	74.36 m	Ümmet Değirmenci; Turkey	74.31 m

=== Women ===
Event	Gold		Silver		Bronze	
100 metres (wind +0.7 m/s)	Paula Sevilla; Spain	11.41	Diana Viesman; Israel	11.59	Basant Hemida; Egypt	11.62
200 metres (wind +1.5 m/s)	Cynthia Leduc; France	23.70	Basant Hemida; Egypt	23.89	Maroussia Pare; France	24.01
400 metres	Kellya Pauline; France	52.89 CR	Rebecca Borga; Italy	53.40	Elisabetta Vandi; Italy	53.53
800 metres	Elena Bello'; Italy	2:04.31 CR	Corane Gazeau; France	2:04.69	Khadija Benkassem; Morocco	2:08.26
1500 metres	Imane El Bouhali; Morocco	4:22.95	Lucia Rodriguez; Spain	4:24.63	Fatma Arik; Turkey	4:29.63
5000 metres	Mathilde Sénéchal; France	16:29.42	Marta Garcia; Spain	16:31.39	Francesca Tomassi; Italy	16:32.21
10,000 metres	Nicole Svetlana Reina; Italy	35:27.66	Rebecca Lonedo; Italy	35:59.51	Nuran Satilmis; Turkey	36:18.80
100 m hurdles (wind +2.2 m/s)	Laura Valette; France	13.11 CR	Elisa Maria Di Lazzaro; Italy	13.22	Nicla Mosetti; Italy	13.26
400 m hurdles	Rebecca Sartori; Italy	57.43	Nina Brino; France	58.11	Lucie Kudela; France	58.11
3000 m steeplechase	Adva Cohen; Israel	9:57.37 CR	Sumeyye Erol; Turkey	10:11.15	Gulnaz Uskun; Turkey	10:14.69
4 × 100 m relay	France; Caroline Chaillou; Cynthia Leduc; Maroussia Pare; Sarah Richard-Minghas	44.39 CR	Italy; Aurora Berton; Moillet Kouakou; Alessia Carpinteri; Vittoria Fontana	44.40	Spain; Anna Obradors; Bianca Acosta; Paula Sevilla; Isabel Shili Grau	45.28
4 × 400 m relay	Italy; Alice Mangione; Elisabetta Vandi; Rebecca Borga; Virginia Troiani	3:37.88 CR	France; Nina Brino; Kellya Pauline; Lucie Kudela; Laurine Xailly	3:41.62	not assigned	N/A
10,000 metres walk	Lidia Sanchez-Puebla; Spain	45:13.73	Chahinez Nasri; Tunisia	45:50.19	Edna Barros; Portugal	46:05.42
High jump	Erika Furlani; Italy	1.86 m	Sara Ascic; Croatia	1.80 m	Saleta Fernández; Spain	1.76 m
Pole vault	Elen Klaountia Polak; Greece	4.35 m CR	Monica Clemente; Spain	4.30 m	Mallaury Sauterau; France	4.30 m
Long jump	Evelise Veiga; Portugal	6.26 m	Fátima Diame; Spain	6.15 m	Hillary Kapcha; France	6.06 m
Triple jump	Fátima Diame; Spain	13.82 m	Evelise Veiga; Portugal	13.65 m	Ilonis Guillaume; France	13.45 m
Shot put	Emel Dereli; Turkey	18.12 m CR	Sydney Giampietro; Italy	15.97 m	Eliana Bandeira; Portugal	15.69 m
Discus throw	Daisy Osakue; Italy	58.49 m CR	Kristina Rakocevic; Montenegro	55.11 m	Estel Valeanu; Israel	51.26 m
Hammer throw	Audrey Ciofani; France	64.87 m	Camille Saint-Luce; France	64.47 m	Sara Fantini; Italy	61.38 m
Javelin throw	Eda Tuğsuz; Turkey	57.23 m CR	Carolina Visca; Italy	52.25 m	Theodora Arampatzi; Greece	51.39 m

== Medal table ==
Host

Rank	Nation	Gold	Silver	Bronze	Total
1	France	16	6	8	30
2	Italy*	13	15	9	37
3	Spain	4	7	6	17
4	Tunisia	2	4	1	7
5	Turkey	2	2	7	11
6	Portugal	1	2	3	6
7	Israel	1	1	1	3
8	Greece	1	0	2	3
9	Morocco	1	0	1	2
10	Cyprus	1	0	0	1
11	Croatia	0	2	0	2
12	Algeria	0	1	2	3
13	Egypt	0	1	1	2
14	Montenegro	0	1	0	1
Totals (14 entries)		42	42	41	125
