= 2019 IAAF World Relays – Mixed 4 × 400 metres relay =

Mixed 4 × 400 metres relay at the 2019 IAAF World Relays
- Venue: Nissan Stadium
- Dates: 11 May (heats) & 12 May (finals A&B)
- Nations: 17
- Winning time: 3:16.43

Medalists
gold medal	My'Lik Kerley; Joanna Atkins; Jasmine Blocker; Dontavius Wright; Brionna Thomas*; Olivia Baker*	United States
silver medal	Austin Cole; Aiyanna Stiverne; Zoe Sherar; Philip Osei; Alicia Brown*	Canada
bronze medal	Jared Momanyi; Maureen Thomas; Hellen Syombua; Aron Koech	Kenya

The mixed 4 × 400 metres relay at the 2019 IAAF World Relays was held at the Nissan Stadium on 11 and 12 May.

== Records ==
Prior to the competition, the records were as follows:

World record	United States	3:13.20	Eugene, United States	29 July 2016
Championship record	Bahamas	3:14.42	(The Bahamas) Nassau, Bahamas	23 April 2017

== Results ==
KEY:	Q	Qualified	q	Fastest non-qualifiers	WL	World leading	CR	Championship record	NR	National record	SB	Seasonal best	WC	2019 World Championships qualification

=== Heats ===
Qualification: First 2 of each heat (Q) plus the 2 fastest times (q) advanced to the final.

Rank	Heat	Nation	Athletes	Time	Notes
1	3	Poland	Kajetan Duszyński (M), Patrycja Wyciszkiewicz (W), Justyna Święty-Ersetic (W), Karol Zalewski (M)	3:15.46	Q, WL, AR, *WC
2	3	United States	Brionna Thomas (W), My'Lik Kerley (M), Olivia Baker (W), Dontavius Wright (M)	3:16.01	Q, SB, *WC
3	3	Italy	Davide Re (M), Giancarla Trevisan (W), Andrew Howe (M), Raphaela Lukudo (W)	3:16.12	q, NR*, *WC
4	2	Canada	Austin Cole (M), Aiyanna Stiverne (W), Alicia Brown (W), Philip Osei (M)	3:16.78	Q, NR, *WC
5	2	Germany	Tobias Lange (M), Laura Müller (W), Nadine Gonska (W), Torben Junker (M)	3:16.85	Q, NR, *WC
6	2	Kenya	Jared Nyambweke Momanyi (M), Maureen Nyatichi Thomas (W), Hellen Syombua (W), Aron Koech (M)	3:16.90	q, NR, *WC
7	1	Belgium	Julien Watrin (M), Camille Laus (W), Liefde Schoemaker (W), Dylan Borlée (M)	3:18.03	Q, NR, *WC
8	1	Brazil	Lucas Carvalho (M), Tiffani Marinho (W), Cristiane Silva (W), Alexander Russo (M)	3:18.26	Q, AR, *WC
9	1	Jamaica	Fitzroy Dunkley (M), Janieve Russell (W), Rhonda Whyte (W), Jamari Rose (M)	3:18.47	NR, *WC
10	3	France	Wilfried Happio (M), Kellya Pauline (W), Estelle Perrossier (W), Nicolas Courbiere (M)	3:18.93	NR, *WC
11	3	Japan	Rikuya Ito (M), Seika Aoyama (W), Mayu Inaoka (W), Naoki Kitadani (M)	3:19.71	NR, *WC
12	2	Great Britain	Alex Haydock-Wilson (M), Finette Agyapong (W), Anyika Onuora (W), Jamal Rhoden-Stevens (M)	3:20.49	NR, *WC
13	2	China	Lu Zhiquan (M), Wang Chunyu (W), Huang Guifen (W), Yu Yang (M)	3:21.66	
14	1	Australia	Ian Halpin (M), Rebecca Bennett (W), Angeline Blackburn (W), Luke Stevens (M)	3:21.80	SB
15	1	India	Jithu Baby (M), Sonia Baishya (W), Prachi (W), Antony Alex (M)	3:23.59	
16	2	Kazakhstan	Andrey Sokolov (M), Svetlana Golendova (W), Elina Mikhina (W), Mikhail Litvin (M)	3:24.54	
	3	Papua New Guinea	Emmanuel Wanga (M), Leonie Beu (W), Shadrick Tansi (M), Isila Manukip Apkup (W)	DQ	R170.19
	1	South Africa		DNS	

=== Final ===
Rank	Nation	Athletes	Time	Notes	Points
1st place, gold medalist(s)	United States	My'Lik Kerley (M), Joanna Atkins (W), Jasmine Blocker (W), Dontavius Wright (M)	3:16.43		8
2nd place, silver medalist(s)	Canada	Austin Cole (M), Aiyanna Stiverne (W), Zoe Sherar (W), Philip Osei (M)	3:18.15		7
3rd place, bronze medalist(s)	Kenya	Jared Momanyi (M), Maureen Thomas (W), Hellen Syombua (W), Aron Koech (M)	3:19.43		6
4	Italy	Giuseppe Leonardi (M), Virginia Troiani (W), Chiara Bazzoni (W), Alessandro Sibilio (M)	3:20.28		5
5	Poland	Przemysław Waściński (M), Małgorzata Hołub-Kowalik (W), Justyna Saganiak (W), Patryk Dobek (M)	3:20.65		4
6	Brazil	Lucas Carvalho (M), Tiffani Marinho (W), Cristiane Silva (W), Alexander Russo (M)	3:20.71		3
7	Germany	Marc Koch (M), Corinna Schwab (W), Svea Köhrbrück (W), Marvin Schlegel (M)	3:22.26		2
8	Belgium	Julien Watrin (M), Lucie Ferauge (W), Hanne Claes (W), Jonathan Sacoor (M)	3:25.74		1
