= 2021 World Athletics Relays – Mixed 4 × 400 metres relay =

Mixed 4 × 400 metres relay at the 2021 World Athletics Relays
- Venue: Silesian Stadium
- Dates: 1 May (heats) & 2 May (final)
- Nations: 21
- Winning time: 3:16.60

Medalists
gold medal	Edoardo Scotti (M); Giancarla Trevisan (W); Alice Mangione (W); Davide Re (M)	Italy
silver medal	Anderson Henriques (M); Tiffani Marinho (W); Geisa Coutinho (W); Alison dos Santos (M)	Brazil
bronze medal	Lidio Féliz (M); Anabel Medina Ventura (W); Marileidy Paulino (W); Alexander Ogando (M)	Dominican Republic

The mixed 4 × 400 metres relay at the 2021 World Athletics Relays was held at the Silesian Stadium on 1 and 2 May.

== Records ==
Prior to the competition, the records were as follows:

World record	United States	3:13.20	Eugene, United States	29 July 2016
Championship record	Bahamas	3:14.42	(The Bahamas) Nassau, Bahamas	23 April 2017

== Results ==
=== Heats summary ===
Qualification: First 2 of each heat (Q) plus the 2 fastest times (q) advanced to the final.

- Q Qualified
- q Qualified as fastest times
- WL = World leading
- NR = National record
- SB = Seasonal best
- OG* = 2020 Olympic Games qualification
- WC* = 2022 World Championships qualification

Rank	Heat	Nation	Athletes	Time	Notes
1	2	Italy	Edoardo Scotti (M), Giancarla Trevisan (W), Alice Mangione (W), Davide Re (M)	3:16.52	Q WL, OG*, WC*
2	3	Brazil	Anderson Henriques (M), Tiffani Marinho (W), Geisa Coutinho (W), Alison dos Santos (M)	3:16.53	Q SB, WC*
3	3	Dominican Republic	Yancarlos Martínez (M), Anabel Medina (W), Marileidy Paulino (W), Alexander Ogando (M)	3:16.67	Q PB, OG*, WC*
4	3	Ireland	Christopher O'Donnell (M), Phil Healy (W), Sharlene Mawdsley (W), Thomas Barr (M)	3:16.84	q PB, OG*, WC*
5	2	Belgium	Jonathan Sacoor (M), Cynthia Bolingo (W), Camille Laus (W), Kevin Borlée (M)	3:17.23	Q SB, WC*
6	3	United Kingdom	Rabah Yousif (M), Laviai Nielsen (W), Emily Diamond (W), Lee Thompson (M)	3:17.27	q SB, WC*
7	2	Colombia	Jhon Perlaza (M), Rosa Escobar (W), Jennifer Padilla (W), Anthony Zambrano (M)	3:17.61	PB, WC*
8	2	Poland	Mateusz Rzeźniczak (M), Aleksandra Gaworska (W), Karolina Łozowska (W), Patryk Grzegorzewicz (M)	3:17.92	SB, WC*
9	1	Netherlands	Nout Wardenburg (M), Femke Bol (W), Lieke Klaver (W), Tony van Diepen (M)	3:18.04	Q PB, OG*, WC*
10	2	Japan	Kosuke Ikeda (M), Nanako Matsumoto (W), Mayu Kobayashi (W), Aoto Suzuki (M)	3:18.76	PB, WC*
11	1	Spain	Julio Arenas (M), Andrea Jiménez (W), Aauri Lorena Bokesa (W), Bernat Erta (M)	3:18.98	Q NR, OG*, WC*
12	2	South Africa	Ukona Khuzwayo (M), Dalene Mpiti (W), Taylon Bieldt (W), Ranti Dikgale (M)	3:19.18	PB, WC*
13	3	Germany	Henrik Krause (M), Luna Thiel (W), Hannah Mergenthaler (W), Johannes Trefz (M)	3:19.19	SB
14	2	Slovakia	Oliver Murcko (M), Iveta Putalová (W), Emma Zapletalová (W), Šimon Bujna (M)	3:19.66	PB
15	3	Belarus	Aliaksandr Vasileuskiy (M), Aliaksandra Khilmanovich (W), Asteria Limai (W), Ihar Zubko (M)	3:19.73	PB
16	1	France	Amandine Brossier (W), Elise Trynkler (W), Christopher Naliali (M), Thomas Jordier (M)	3:20.95	SB
17	3	Botswana	Zibane Ngozi (M), Oarabile Mokenane (W), Christine Botlogetswe (W), Bayapo Ndori (M)	3:20.97	SB
18	1	Turkey	Kubilay Ençü (M), Büşra Yıldırım (W), Elif Polat (W), Sinan Ören (M)	3:20.98	SB
19	1	Czech Republic	Matěj Krsek (M), Barbora Malíková (W), Lada Vondrová (W), Daniel Lehar (M)	3:21.05	SB
20	1	Portugal	Vera Barbosa (W), Ricardo dos Santos (M), Cátia Azevedo (W), Mauro Pereira (M)	3:21.51	SB
	1	Kenya	Jared Momanyi (M), Joan Cherono (W), Mary Moraa (W), Aron Koech (M)	DQ	

=== Final ===
Italian national track relay team confirms the first place obtained in the heats summary.

Rank	Nation	Athletes	Time	Notes
1st place, gold medalist(s)	Italy	Edoardo Scotti (M), Giancarla Trevisan (W), Alice Mangione (W), Davide Re (M)	3:16.60	
2nd place, silver medalist(s)	Brazil	Anderson Henriques (M), Tiffani Marinho (W), Geisa Coutinho (W), Alison dos Santos (M)	3:17.54	
3rd place, bronze medalist(s)	Dominican Republic	Lidio Féliz (M), Anabel Medina Ventura (W), Marileidy Paulino (W), Alexander Ogando (M)	3:17.58	
4	Belgium	Dylan Borlée (M), Cynthia Bolingo (W), Camille Laus (W), Kevin Borlée (M)	3:17.92	
5	United Kingdom	Lee Thompson (M), Zoey Clark (W), Yasmin Liverpool (W), Rabah Yousif (M)	3:18.87	
6	Spain	Samuel García (M), Andrea Jiménez (W), Aauri Bokesa (W), Bernat Erta (M)	3:19.65	
7	Ireland	Andrew Mellon (M), Phil Healy (W), Sharlene Mawdsley (W), Christopher O'Donnell (M)	3:20.26	
8	Netherlands	Nout Wardenburg (M), Eveline Saalberg (W), Laura de Witte (W), Terrence Agard (M)	3:21.02	
