= Petra Nardelli =

Italian sprinter

Personal information
- National team: Italy
- Born: 10 April 1996 (age 30) Bolzano, Italy
- Height: 1.79 m (5 ft 10 in)
- Weight: 57 kg (126 lb)

Sport
- Sport: Athletics
- Event: 400 m
- Club: Südtirol Team Club
- Coached by: Hans Pircher

Achievements and titles
- Personal best: 400 m: 53.19 (2021)

Petra Nardelli (born 10 April 1996) is an Italian sprinter, selected to be part of the Italian athletics team for the Tokyo 2020 Olympics, as a possible member of the relay team.
