= Elisabetta Vandi =

Italian sprinter

Personal information
- National team: Italy: 2 caps (2019-2020)
- Born: 30 March 2000 (age 26) Pesaro, Italy
- Height: 1.76 m (5 ft 9 in)
- Weight: 59 kg (130 lb)

Sport
- Sport: Athletics
- Event: Sprinting
- Club: Fiamme Oro Padova
- Coached by: Faouzi Lahbi

Achievements and titles
- Personal best: 400 m: 52.82 (2019)
Medal record
World Athletics Relays
Bronze medal – third place	2019 Yokohama	4×400 m relay

Elisabetta Vandi (born 30 March 2000) is an Italian sprinter who won bronze medal with the Italian national track relay team at the 2019 IAAF World Relays.

Elisabetta is the younger sister of the middle-distance runner Eleonora Vandi.

== National records ==
Under 20

- 400 metres: 53.24 ( (Finland) Tampere, 11 July 2018) - current holder.

== Achievements ==
Youth

Year	Competition	Venue	Rank	Event	Time	Notes
2018	World U20 Championships	(Finland) Tampere	7th	400 m	53.40	(Note: She ran national record under-20 in semifinal with the time of 53.24.)
2018	World U20 Championships	(Finland) Tampere	6th	4 × 400 m relay	3:34.00	NJR

Senior

Year	Competition	Venue	Rank	Event	Time	Notes
2019	World Athletics Relays	(Japan) Yokohama	3rd	4 × 400 m relay	3:27.74 (Note: She don't ran the final but just won the medal.)	(Note: She ran in heats with the team time of 3:29.08.)

== See also ==
- Italy at the World Athletics Relays
- Italy at the 2018 European Athletics Championships
