= 2019 IAAF World Relays – Women's 4 × 400 metres relay =

Women's 4 × 400 metres relay at the 2019 IAAF World Relays
- Venue: Nissan Stadium
- Dates: 11 May (heats) & 12 May (finals A&B)
- Nations: 21
- Winning time: 3:27.49

Medalists
gold medal	Małgorzata Hołub-Kowalik; Patrycja Wyciszkiewicz; Anna Kiełbasińska; Justyna Święty-Ersetic	Poland
silver medal	Jaide Stepter; Shakima Wimbley; Jessica Beard; Courtney Okolo; Jordan Lavender*; Joanna Atkins*	United States
bronze medal	Maria Benedicta Chigbolu; Ayomide Folorunso; Giancarla Trevisan; Raphaela Lukudo; Elisabetta Vandi*; Chiara Bazzoni*	Italy

The women's 4 × 400 metres relay at the 2019 IAAF World Relays was held at the Nissan Stadium on 11 and 12 May.

== Records ==
Prior to the competition, the records were as follows:

World record	Soviet Union (Tatyana Ledovskaya, Olga Nazarova, Mariya Pinigina, Olga Bryzgina)	3:15.17	Seoul, South Korea	1 October 1988
Championship record	United States (Phyllis Francis, Natasha Hastings, Sanya Richards-Ross, Francena McCorory)	3:19.39	(The Bahamas) Nassau, Bahamas	3 May 2015
World Leading	USATF High Performance C	3:26.29	Gainesville, United States	30 March 2019

== Results ==
KEY:	Q	Qualified	q	Fastest non-qualifiers	WL	World leading	CR	Championship record	NR	National record	SB	Seasonal best	WC	2019 World Championships qualification

=== Heats ===
Qualification: First 2 of each heat (Q) plus the 2 fastest times (q) advanced to the final A. The next 8 fastest times qualified for the final B.

Rank	Heat	Nation	Athletes	Time	Notes
1	2	United States	Jaide Stepter, Jordan Lavender, Joanna Atkins, Courtney Okolo	3:25.72	Q, WL
2	1	Poland	Małgorzata Hołub-Kowalik, Patrycja Wyciszkiewicz, Anna Kiełbasińska, Justyna Święty-Ersetic	3:28.05	Q, SB
3	2	Great Britain	Zoey Clark, Laviai Nielsen, Amy Allcock, Emily Diamond	3:28.31	Q, SB
4	3	Canada	Maya Stephens, Madeline Price, Travia Jones, Sage Watson	3:28.75	Q
5	3	Jamaica	Christine Day, Shiann Salmon, Tiffany James, Chrisann Gordon	3:28.80	Q, SB
6	2	Italy	Maria Benedicta Chigbolu, Ayomide Folorunso, Elisabetta Vandi, Chiara Bazzoni	3:29.08	Q, SB
7	1	Switzerland	Léa Sprunger, Veronica Vancardo, Fanette Humair, Yasmin Giger	3:29.15	q, SB
8	2	France	Amandine Brossier, Déborah Sananes, Elea Mariama Diarra, Agnès Raharolahy	3:29.89	q, SB
9	2	Netherlands	Madiea Ghafoor, Lieke Klaver, Laura de Witte, Femke Bol	3:30.07	qB, SB
10	2	Germany	Luna Bulmahn, Corinna Schwab, Ruth Sophia Spelmeyer, Hannah Mergenthaler	3:30.32	qB, SB
11	1	Belgium	Camille Laus, Hanne Claes, Paulien Couckuyt, Lucie Ferauge	3:30.69	qB, SB
12	3	China	Fu Na, Liao Mengxue, Tong Zenghuan, Yang Huizhen	3:31.01	qB, SB
13	2	Chile	Isidora Jiménez, Maria José Echeverría, María Fernanda Mackenna, Martina Weil	3:31.24	qB, NR
14	1	Kenya	Maureen Nyatichi Thomas, Hellen Syombua, Neviah Mongina Michira, Gladys Musyoki	3:31.26	qB, SB
15	1	Australia	Ellie Beer, Morgan Mitchell, Caitlin Sargent-Jones, Lauren Wells	3:31.34	qB, SB
16	2	Japan	Seika Aoyama, Nanako Matsumoto, Konomi Takeishi, Yuna Iwata	3:31.72	qB, SB
17	3	India	Hima Das, Poovamma Raju Machettira, Saritaben Laxmanbhai Gayakwad, V. K. Vismaya	3:31.93	SB
18	3	Nigeria	Patience Okon George, Favour Ofili, Praise Oghenefejiro Idamadudu, Yinka Ajayi	3:32.10	SB
19	1	Uganda	Emily Nanziri, Stella Wonruku, Scovia Ayikoru, Leni Shida	3:35.02	SB
20	3	Lithuania	Eva Misiūnaitė, Modesta Justė Morauskaitė, Eglė Balčiūnaitė, Gabija Galvydytė	3:38.72	SB
	3	Ukraine	Kateryna Klymiuk, Alina Logvynenko, Tetyana Melnyk, Anna Ryzhykova	DQ	R163.2(b)

=== Final B ===
Rank	Nation	Athletes	Time	Notes
1	Netherlands	Madiea Ghafoor, Lieke Klaver, Femke Bol, Lisanne de Witte	3:29.03	*WC
2	Belgium	Hanne Claes, Paulien Couckuyt, Liefde Schoemaker, Camille Laus	3:31.71	*WC
3	Germany	Luna Bulmahn, Laura Müller, Ruth Sophia Spelmeyer, Hannah Mergenthaler	3:31.89	
4	China	Liao Mengxue, Fu Na, Tong Zenghuan, Yang Huizhen	3:31.91	
5	Australia	Ellie Beer, Morgan Mitchell, Caitlin Sargent-Jones, Lauren Wells	3:32.22	
6	Chile	Isidora Jiménez, Maria José Echeverría, María Fernanda Mackenna, Martina Weil	3:33.54	
7	Japan	Seika Aoyama, Nanako Matsumoto, Konomi Takeishi, Yuna Iwata	3:35.12	
8	Kenya	Gladys Musyoki, Eglay Nafuna Nalyanya, Emily Cherotich Tuei, Neviah Mongina Michira	3:43.01	

=== Final A ===
Rank	Nation	Athletes	Time	Notes	Points
1st place, gold medalist(s)	Poland	Małgorzata Hołub-Kowalik, Patrycja Wyciszkiewicz, Anna Kiełbasińska, Justyna Święty-Ersetic	3:27.49	SB, *WC	8
2nd place, silver medalist(s)	United States	Jaide Stepter, Shakima Wimbley, Jessica Beard, Courtney Okolo	3:27.65	*WC	7
3rd place, bronze medalist(s)	Italy	Maria Benedicta Chigbolu, Ayomide Folorunso, Giancarla Trevisan, Raphaela Lukudo	3:27.74	SB, *WC	6
4	Canada	Maya Stephens, Madeline Price, Alicia Brown, Sage Watson	3:28.21	SB, *WC	5
5	Jamaica	Chrisann Gordon, Anastasia Le-Roy, Tiffany James, Janieve Russell	3:28.30	SB, *WC	4
6	Great Britain	Emily Diamond, Laviai Nielsen, Zoey Clark, Amy Allcock	3:28.96	*WC	3
7	Switzerland	Léa Sprunger, Fanette Humair, Veronica Vancardo, Yasmin Giger	3:32.32	*WC	2
8	France	Estelle Perrossier, Brigitte Ntiamoah, Kellya Pauline, Amandine Brossier	3:36.28	*WC	1
