= Eleonora Marchiando =

Italian sprinter (born 1997)

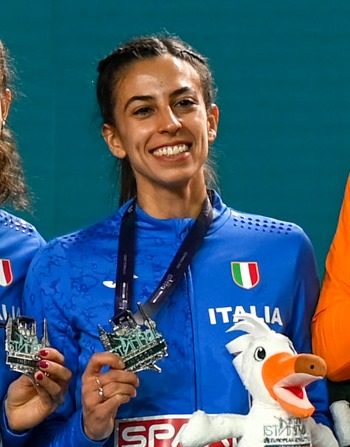
- Eleonora Marchiando on the 4 × 400 m relay Istanbul 2023 podium

Personal information
- Nationality: Italian
- Born: 27 September 1997 (age 28) Aosta, Italy

Sport
- Sport: Athletics
- Event(s): 400 m 400 m hs
- Club: Atletica Sandro Calvesi; C.S. Carabinieri
- Coached by: Eddy Ottoz

Achievements and titles
- Personal best: 400 m hs: 55.16 (2021)
Medal record
Women's athletics
Representing Italy
European Indoor Championships
Silver medal – second place	2023 Istanbul	4 × 400 m relay
European Team Championships
Bronze medal – third place	2021 Silesia	4 × 400 m relay

Eleonora Marchiando (born 27 September 1997) is an Italian athlete. She competed in the women's 400 metres event at the 2021 European Athletics Indoor Championships. She competed at the 2020 Summer Olympics, in 400 m hurdles.

== National records ==
- 4 × 400 metres relay indoor: 3:30.32 (Toruń, Poland, 7 March 2021 with Rebecca Borga, Alice Mangione, Eloisa Coiro)

== Personal best ==
- 400 m hs: 55.68 (Geneva, Switzerland, 12 June 2021)

== Achievements ==
Year	Competition	Venue	Position	Event	Time	Notes
2021	European Indoor Championships	(Poland) Toruń	4th	4 × 400 metres relay	3:30.32	NR
2021	European Team Championships (SL)	(Poland) Chorzów	3rd	4 × 400 m relay	3:29.05	

== National titles ==
Marchiando won two national championships at individual senior level.

- Italian Athletics Championships
  - 400 m hs: 2021
- Italian Athletics Indoor Championships
  - 400 m: 2022

== See also ==
- Italian all-time top lists - 400 metres hurdles
