= Anna Bongiorni =

Italian sprinter (born 1993)

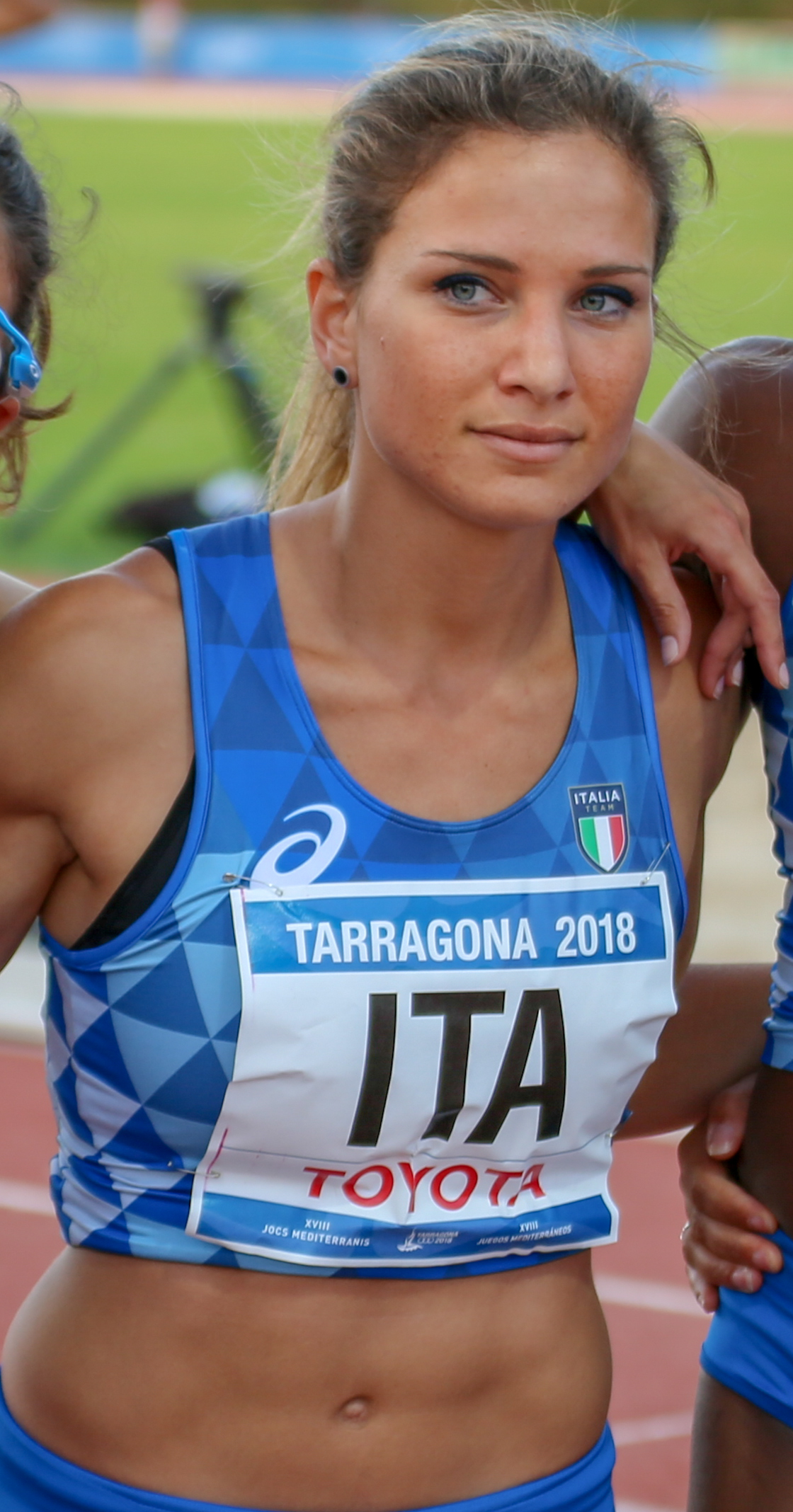
- Anna Bongiorni in 2018

Personal information
- National team: Italy: 12 caps (2015-2021)
- Born: 15 September 1993 (age 32) Pisa, Italy
- Height: 1.62 m (5 ft 4 in)
- Weight: 48 kg (106 lb)

Sport
- Country: Italy
- Sport: Athletics
- Event: Sprinting
- Club: C.S. Carabinieri
- Coached by: Roberto Bonomi

Achievements and titles
- Personal bests: 100 m: 11.27 (2021); 200 m: 23.35 (2017); 60 m indoor: 7.24 (2018)
Medal record
Senior level
Event	1st	2nd	3rd
World Relays	1	0	0
Universiade	0	0	1
Mediterranean Games	0	0	2
Total	1	0	3
Representing Italy
European Championships
Bronze medal – third place	2022 Munich	4×100 m relay
World Relays
Gold medal – first place	2021 Chorzów	4×100 m relay
Summer Universiade
Bronze medal – third place	2017 Taipei	200 m
Mediterranean Games
Bronze medal – third place	2018 Tarragona	100 m
Bronze medal – third place	2018 Tarragona	4x100 m relay
Youth level
Event	1st	2nd	3rd
European U23 Championships	0	1	0
European U20 Championships	0	1	0
Youth Olympic Games	0	0	1
Gymnasiade	1	1	0
Total	1	3	1
European U20 Championships
Silver medal – second place	2011 Tallinn	4x100 m relay
European U23 Championships
Silver medal – second place	2015 Tallinn	4x100 m relay

Anna Bongiorni (born 15 September 1993) is an Italian sprinter. She won a bronze medal at the 2017 Summer Universiade in the 200 metres. Bongiorni is a two-time national champion at senior individual level (60 m indoor in 2017 and 2018). She competed at the 2020 Summer Olympics in the 100 m.

== Career ==
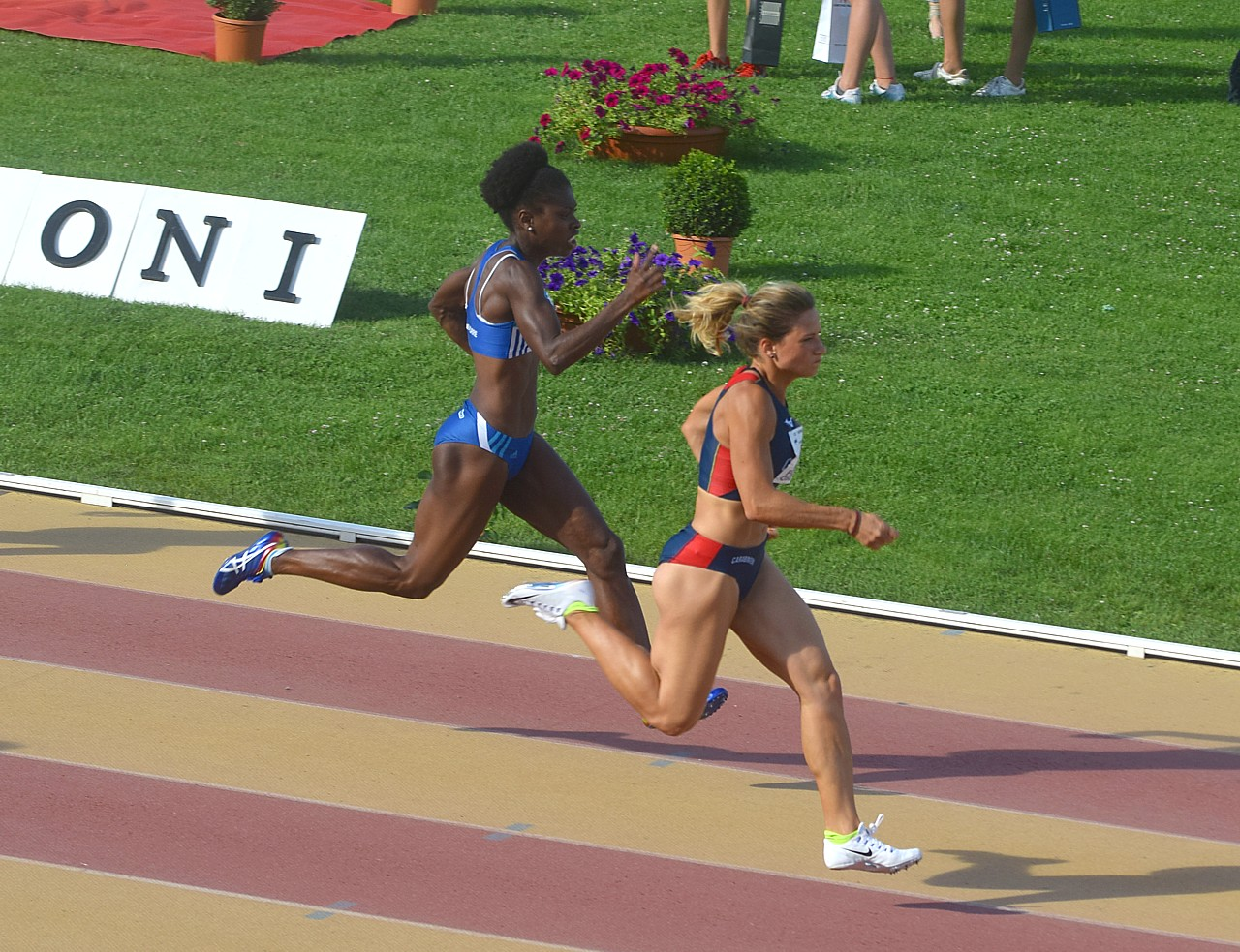
Bongiorni in action in 2018.

In 2015, Bongiorni competed in the 4 × 100 metres relay event at the 2015 World Championships in Athletics in Beijing, China.

In 2017, she won the national indoor championships in the 60 metres. Later in the year, she won a bronze medal at the Summer Universiade.

In 2018, she became the national indoor champion in the 60 metres again. She later won two bronze medals at the Mediterranean Games in the 100 metres and 4×100 relay.

In her national career, she won minor titles in relays (4×100 and 4 × 200 m), five medals won overall, six youths (two times the 100 m student and the same 4 × 100 m from cadet, once the coupled 100–200 m from promises) and two University (100 and 200 m).

== Personal life ==
She is the daughter of the Italian former sprinter Giovanni Bongiorni. In June 2019, she graduated in medicine.

== Statistics ==
=== National records ===
- 4 × 100 m relay: 42.90 (Doha, Qatar, 4 October 2019), she ran third leg in the team with Johanelis Herrera, Gloria Hooper, Irene Siragusa - current holder

=== Progression ===
Personal Best

==== 100 metres ====
Year	Time	Wind	Venue	Date	Ref.
2020	11.30	+2.0	Savona (ITA)	16 July 2020	
2019	11.61	+0.2	Wuhan (CHN)	22 October 2019	
2018	11.39	-0.7	Orvieto (ITA)	20 July 2018	
2017	11.39	+0.7	Trieste (ITA)	1 July 2017	
2016	11.60	+0.6	Orvieto (ITA)	29 July 2016	
2015	11.56	+0.3	Turin (ITA)	25 July 2015	
2013	11.86	+1.1	Rieti (ITA)	14 June 2013	
2011	11.68	+1.3	Bressanone (ITA)	17 June 2011	
2010	11.82	+1.2	Moskva (RUS)	21 May 2010	
2009	11.98	+1.8	Quarrata (ITA)	9 June 2009	

==== 200 metres ====
Year	Time	Wind	Venue	Date	Ref.
2020	23.31	+0.8	Rieti (ITA)	23 July 2020	
2018	23.52	-1.0	Orvieto (ITA)	20 July 2018	
2017	23.35	+0.7	Genève (SUI)	10 June 2017	
2016	23.77	-0.2	Orvieto (ITA)	29 July 2016	
2015	23.80	+1.0	Rieti (ITA)	14 June 2015	
2014	24.65	-0.8	Modena (ITA)	21 June 2014	
2013	24.39	0.0	Rieti (ITA)	1 June 2013	
2011	23.96	-0.5	Bressanone (ITA)	19 June 2011	
2010	23.99	0.0	Moskva (RUS)	23 May 2010	
2009	24.53	+1.7	Bressanone (ITA)	31 May 2009	

=== Achievements ===
Senior

Year	Competition	Venue	Rank	Event	Time	Notes
2015	World Championships	(China) Beijing	SF (12th)	4 × 100 m relay	11.62	SB
2017	European Indoor Championships	(Serbia) Belgrade	SF (19th)	60 m	7.43	(Note: She ran a better crono (7.42) in heats.)
2017	European Team Championships	(France) Lille	4th	4 × 100 m relay	43.38	
2017	Universiade	(Taiwan) Taipei	6th	100 m	11.50	
2017	Universiade	(Taiwan) Taipei	3rd	200 m	23.46	
2018	World Indoor Championships	(United Kingdom) Birmingham	SF (17th)	60 m	6.30	PB (Note: She ran personal best 6.24 in heat.)
2018	Mediterranean Games	(Spain) Tarragone	3rd	100 m	11.53	
2018	Mediterranean Games	(Spain) Tarragone	3rd	4 × 100 m relay	43.63	
2018	European Championships	(Germany) Berlin	SF (24th)	100 m	11.62	(Note: She ran a better crono (11.53) in heats.)
2019	World Relays	(Japan) Yokohama	5th	4 × 100 m relay	44.29	
2019	World Championships	(Qatar) Doha	7th	4 × 100 m relay	42.98	NR (Note: The relay team ran national record 42.90 in heat.)
2021	World Relays	(Poland) Chorzów	1st	4×100 m relay	43.79	SB

=== National titles ===
She won three national championships at individual senior level.

- Italian Athletics Championships
  - 100 m: 2021
- Italian Athletics Indoor Championships
  - 60 m: 2017, 2018

== See also ==
- 2020 in 100 metres
- Italian all-time lists - 100 metres
- Italian national track relay team
