= Davide Re =

Italian sprinter (born 1993)

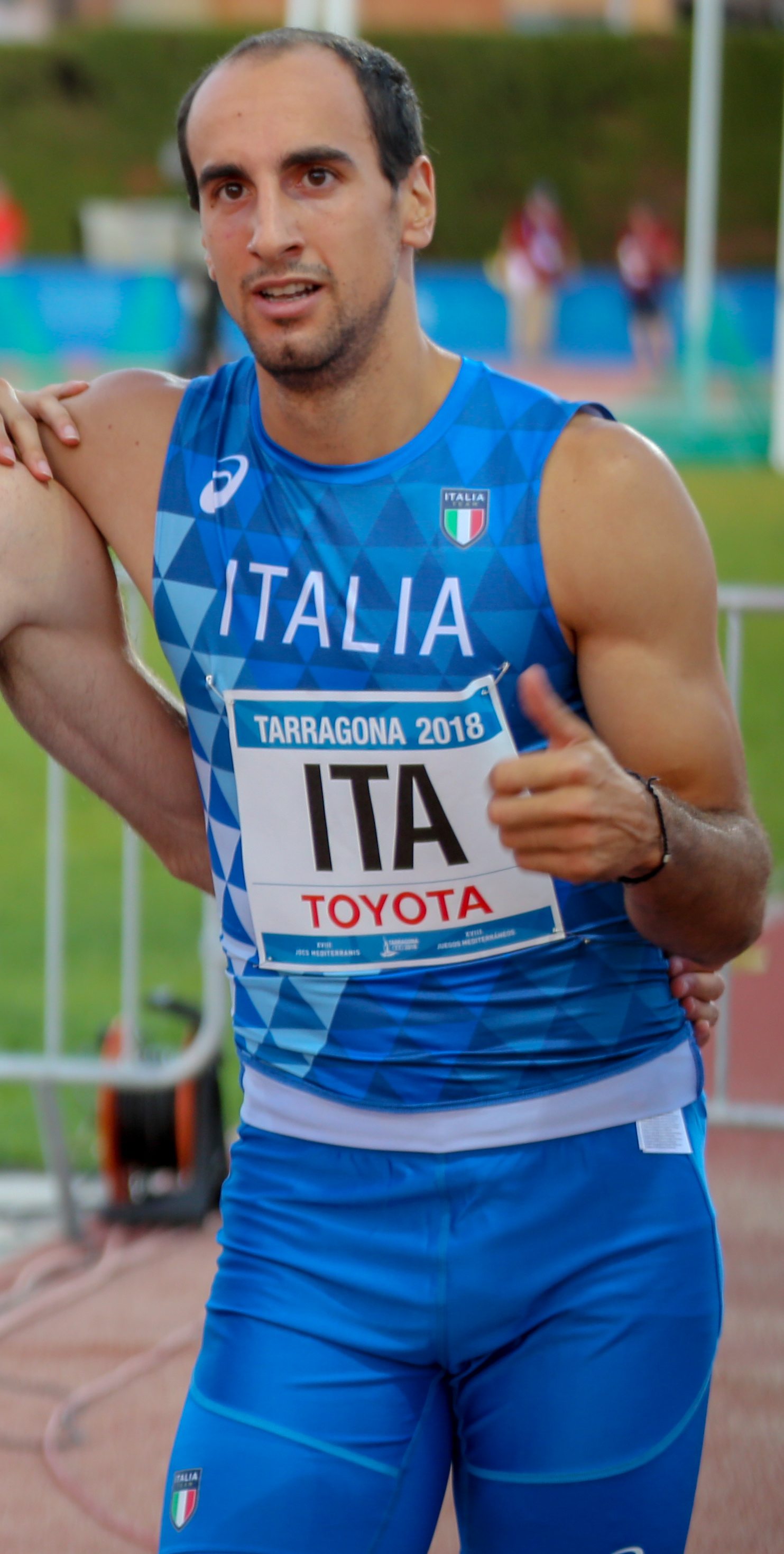
- Re in 2018

Personal information
- Nationality: Italian
- Born: 16 March 1993 (age 33) Milan
- Height: 1.83 m (6 ft 0 in)
- Weight: 75 kg (165 lb)

Sport
- Sport: Athletics
- Event: 400 metres
- Club: G.S. Fiamme Gialle
- Coached by: Maria Chiara Milardi

Achievements and titles
- Personal best: 400 m: 44.77 (2019)
Medal record
World Athletics Relays
Gold medal – first place	2021 Silesia	Mixed 4×400 m relay
European Team Championships
Gold medal – first place	2019 Bydgoszcz	400 m
Gold medal – first place	2019 Bydgoszcz	4x400 m relay
Gold medal – first place	2021 Silesia	4x400 m relay
Bronze medal – third place	2021 Silesia	400 m
Mediterranean Games
Gold medal – first place	2018 Tarragona	400 m
Gold medal – first place	2018 Tarragona	4x400 m relay

Davide Re (born 16 March 1993) is an Italian male 400 metre runner, two times gold medallist at the 2018 Mediterranean Games. He competed at the 2020 Summer Olympics, in 400 m.

== Biography ==
At the individual senior level, he won a silver medal at 2017 European Team Championships Super League and the gold medal two years later at Bydgoszcz 2019 in Poland. He has participated in two editions of the World Championships in the 400 metres, reaching the semifinals in both, finishing 23rd overall at London 2017, and 9th overall with a time of 44.85 at Doha 2019, 8 hundredths of a second off his own national record, set at altitude (1000m above sea level) in La Chaux de Fonds, Switzerland three months before.

== National records ==
Outdoor

- 400 metres: 44.77 ( (Switzerland) La Chaux de Fonds, 30 June 2019) - now national record 44.45 held by Edoardo Scotti since 2025
- Mixed 4 × 400 metres relay: 3:16.15 ( (Japan) Yokohama, 11 May 2019) (Davide Re, Giancarla Trevisan, Andrew Howe, Raphaela Lukudo) - current holder

== Achievements ==
Year	Competition	Venue	Position	Event	Time	Notes
2015	European U23 Championships	(Estonia) Tallinn	4th	400 m	46.37	
2017	European Team Championships	(France) Lille	3rd	400 m	45.56	PB
2017	World Championships	(United Kingdom) London	SF (23rd)	400 m	45.95	
2018	Mediterranean Games	(Spain) Tarragona	1st	400 m	45.26	CR PB
2018	Mediterranean Games	(Spain) Tarragona	1st	4x400 m relay	3:03.54	
2019	IAAF World Relays	(Japan) Yokohama	9th	4x400 m relay	3:02.87	SB
2019	IAAF World Relays	(Japan) Yokohama	4th	4x400 m relay	3:20.28	NR
2019	European Team Championships	(Poland) Bydgoszcz	1st	400 m	45.35	EL
2019	European Team Championships	(Poland) Bydgoszcz	1st	4x400 m relay	3:02.04	
2019	World Championships	(Qatar) Doha	SF (9th)	400 m	44.85	
2021	World Arthletics Relays	(Poland) Chorzów	1st	Mixed 4×400 m relay	3:16.60	

== National titles ==
- Italian Athletics Championships
  - 200 metres: 2018
  - 400 metres: 2017, 2018, 2023

== See also ==
- Italian records in athletics
- Italian all-time lists - 400 metres
