= Johanelis Herrera Abreu =

Dominican-born Italian female hurdler (born 1995)

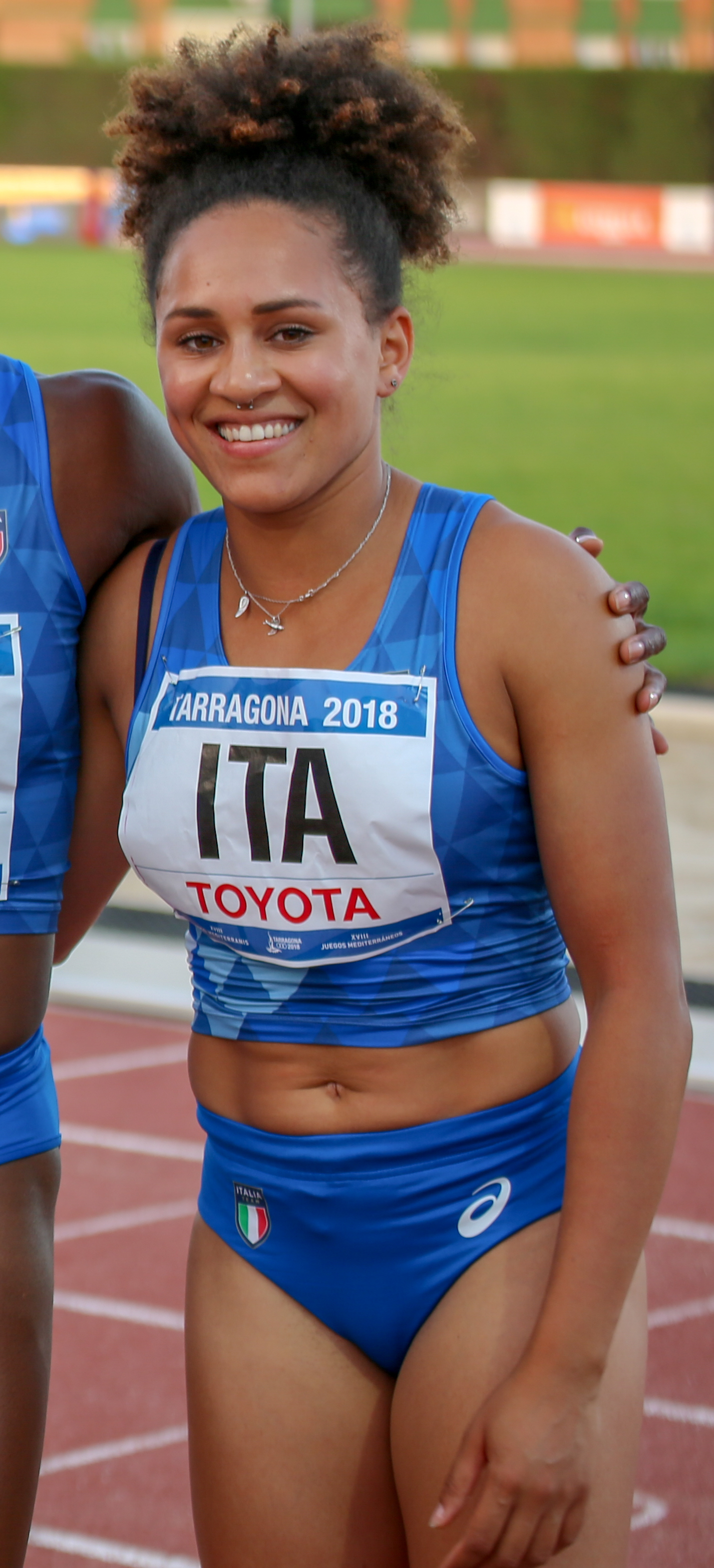
- Herrera Abreu in 2018

Personal information
- Nationality: Italian
- Born: 11 August 1995 (age 30) Santo Domingo, Dominican Republic
- Height: 1.67 m (5 ft 6 in)
- Weight: 49 kg (108 lb)

Sport
- Country: Italy
- Sport: Athletics
- Event: Sprinting

Achievements and titles
- Personal best: 100 m: 11.51 (2019)
Medal record
World Relays
Gold medal – first place	2021 Chorzów	4×100 m relay
Mediterranean Games
Bronze medal – third place	2018 Tarragona	4 × 100 m relay
European U23 Championships
Silver medal – second place	2011 Tallinn	4 × 100 m relay

Johanelis Herrera Abreu (born 11 August 1995) is a Dominican-born Italian female hurdler who won a bronze medal at the 2018 Mediterranean Games. She competed at the 2020 Summer Olympics, in 4 × 100 m relay.

== National records ==
- 4 × 100 m relay: 48.90 ( (Qatar) Doha, 4 October 2019), she ran first leg in the team with Gloria Hooper, Anna Bongiorni, Irene Siragusa – current holder

== Achievements ==
Year	Competition	Venue	Position	Event	Time	Notes
2018	Mediterranean Games	(Spain) Tarragona	3rd	4 × 100 m relay	43.63	
2021	World Relays	(Poland) Chorzów	1st	4×100 m relay	43.79	SB

== National Titles ==
- Italian Athletics Championships:
  - 100 m: 2018
- Italian Athletics Indoor Championships:
  - 60 m: 2019

== See also ==
- Italy at the 2018 Mediterranean Games
