= Alice Mangione =

Italian sprinter (born 1997)

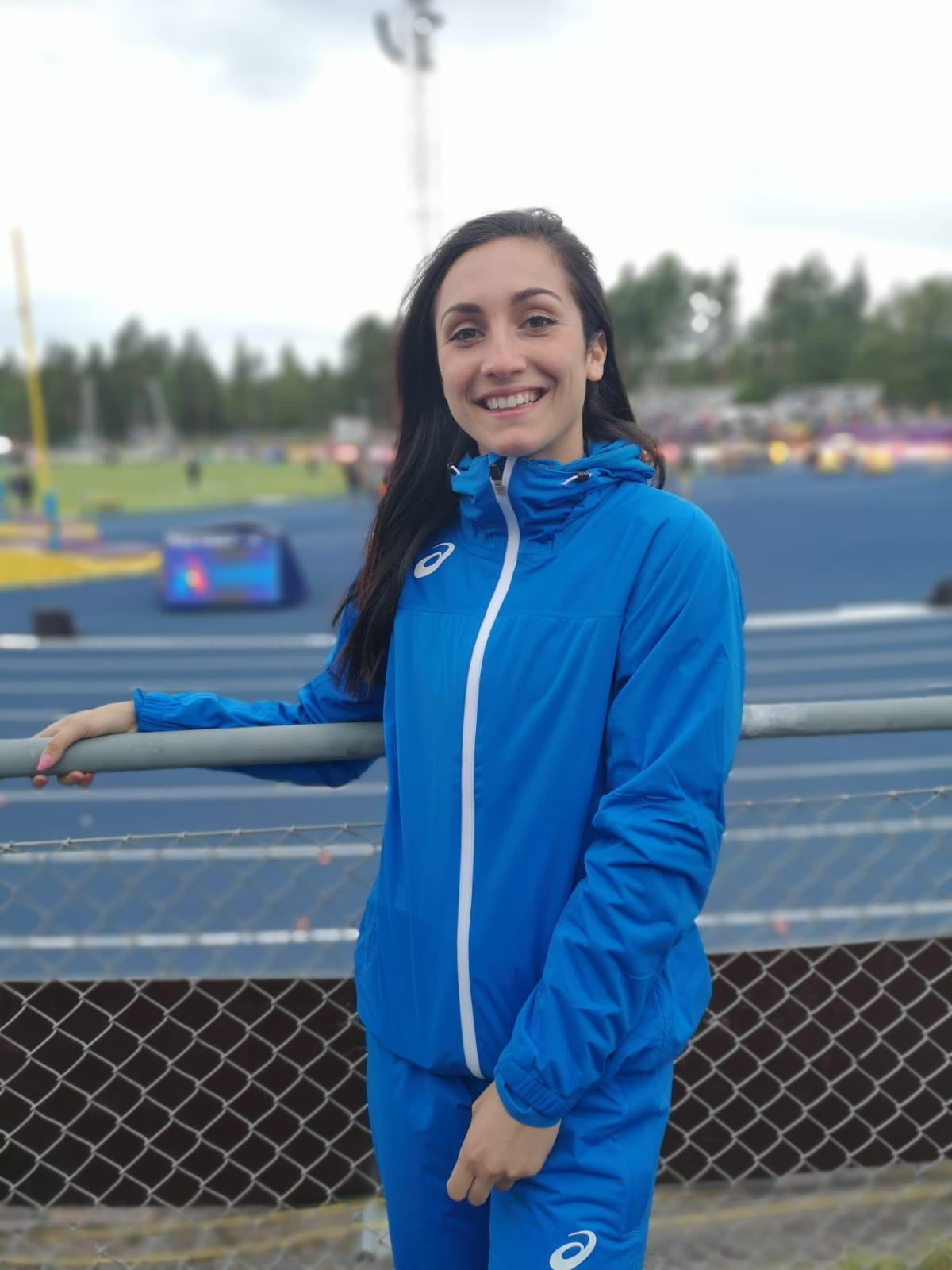
- Alice Mangione in 2020

Personal information
- National team: Italy: 7 caps
- Born: 19 January 1997 (age 29) Niscemi, Italy
- Height: 1.70 m (5 ft 7 in)
- Weight: 58 kg (128 lb)

Sport
- Sport: Athletics
- Event: Sprint
- Club: CUS Palermo (2013-2017); Atletica Brescia 1950 (2018-2021); C.S. Esercito (2021-)
- Coached by: Marta Oliva

Achievements and titles
- Personal best: 400 m: 51.07 (2024)
Medal record
Women's athletics
Representing Italy
Senior level
World Athletics Relays
Gold medal – first place	2021 Silesia	4 × 400 m mixed
European Championships
Silver medal – second place	2024 Rome	4 × 400 m mixed
Bronze medal – third place	2026 Birmingham	4 × 400 m relay
Mediterranean Games
Bronze medal – third place	2026 Taranto	400 m
Youth level
Event	1st	2nd	3rd
European U20 Championships	0	1	0
Mediterranean U23 Championships	1	0	0
Total	1	1	0

Alice Mangione (born 19 January 1997) is an Italian sprinter, specialising in the 400 metres. She competed at the 2020 Summer Olympics in the 4 × 400 m relay and 4 × 400 m mixed relay.

Mangione also competed at the 2024 Summer Olympics in the 400 m, 4 × 400 m relay and 4 × 400 m mixed relay.

== Career ==
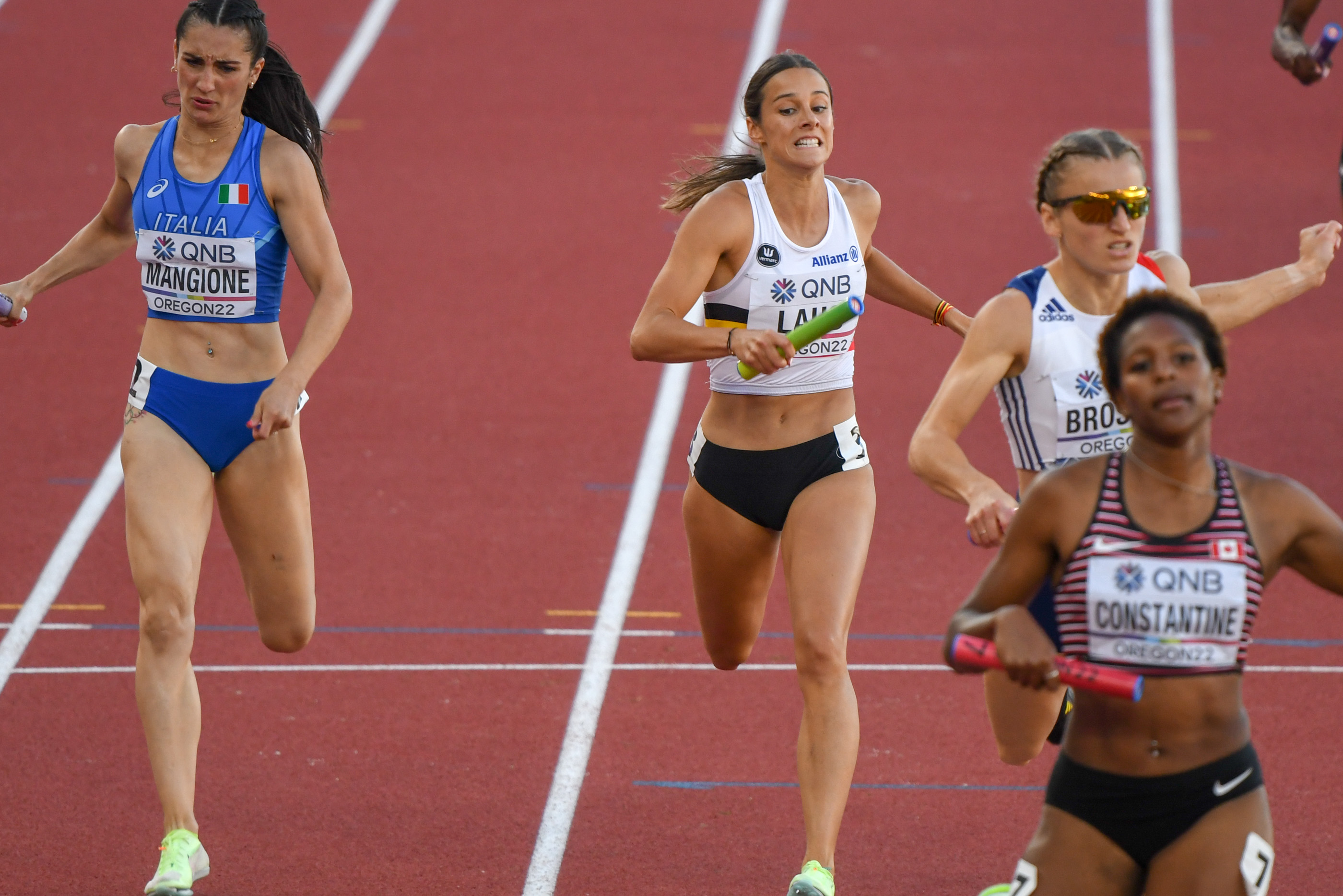
Alice Mangione (azzurra jersey) at Oregon 22.

Mangione competed with the senior Italy national athletics team in the women's 400 metres and 4 × 400 metres relay events at the 2021 European Athletics Indoor Championships. In May 2021 she competed with at the 2021 World Athletics Relays obtaining the qualification with the national team of mixed 4 × 400 m relay in Tokyo 2021.

== National records ==
- 4 × 400 metres relay indoor: 3:30.32 (Toruń, Poland, 7 March 2021 with Rebecca Borga, Eloisa Coiro, Eleonora Marchiando) Current holder
- Mixed 4 × 400 metres relay: 3:16.51 (Tokyo, Japan 30 July 2021 with Edoardo Scotti, Rebecca Borga, Vladimir Aceti) Current holder

== Personal best ==
- 400 m: 51.07 (Paris, France, 6 August 2024)

== Achievements ==
Year	Competition	Venue	Rank	Event	Time	Notes
2021	European Indoor Championships	(Poland) Toruń	4th	4 × 400 m relay	3:30.32	NR
2021	World Athletics Relays	(Poland) Chorzów	1st	4 × 400 m relay mixed	3:16.60	WL, SB
2021	European Team Championships (SL)	(Poland) Chorzów	3rd	4 × 400 m relay	3:29.05	
2021	Olympic Games	(Japan) Tokyo	13th	4 × 400 m relay	3:27.74	SB
2021	Olympic Games	(Japan) Tokyo	10th	Mixed 4 × 400 m relay	3:13.51	NR
2022	World Championships	(United States) Eugene	34th	400 m	52.72	
2022	World Championships	(United States) Eugene	7th	4 × 400 m relay	3:26.75	SB
2022	World Championships	(United States) Eugene	7th	Mixed 4 × 400 m relay	3:16.45	(Note: Season best 3:13.89, 6th crono of the summary, in heats.)

== National titles ==
Mangione won five national championships at individual senior level.

- Italian Athletics Championships
  - 400 m: 2020, 2021, 2022, 2024 (4)
- Italian Athletics Indoor Championships
  - 400 m: 2025 (1)

== See also ==
- List of Italian records in athletics
- Italian all-time top lists - 400 metres
