= Maria Benedicta Chigbolu =

Italian sprinter (born 1989)

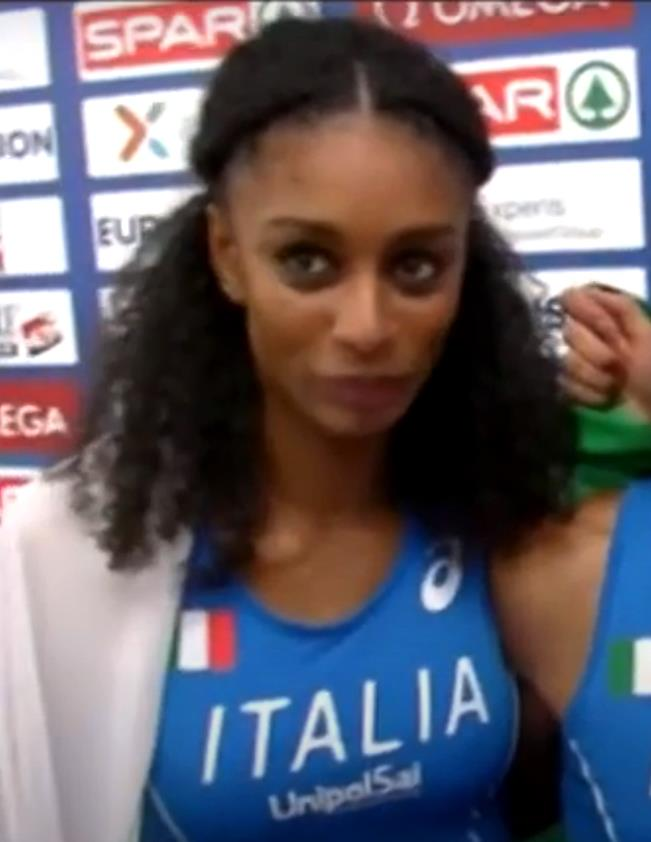
- Maria Chigbolu in 2016

Personal information
- Full name: Maria Benedicta Chigbolu
- Nationality: Italian
- Born: 27 July 1989 (age 36) Rome, Italy
- Height: 1.72 m (5 ft 7 1/2 in)
- Weight: 55 kg (121 lb)

Sport
- Country: Italy
- Sport: Track and field
- Event: Sprint
- Club: G.S. Esercito
- Coached by: Maria Chiara Milardi

Achievements and titles
- Personal bests: 400 m: 51.67 (2015); 4x400 m: 3:25.16 (2016, NR)
Medal record
European Championships
Bronze medal – third place	2016 Amsterdam	4x400 m
IAAF World Relays
Bronze medal – third place	2019 Yokohama	4×400 m
European Team Championships
Bronze medal – third place	2019 Bydgoszcz	400 m
Bronze medal – third place	2019 Bydgoszcz	4x400 m
Mediterranean Games
Bronze medal – third place	2018 Tarragona	400 m
Gold medal – first place	2018 Tarragona	4x400 m
Silver medal – second place	2013 Mersin	400 m
Gold medal – first place	2013 Mersin	4×400 m

Maria Benedicta Chigbolu (born 27 July 1989) is an Italian sprinter, who specializes in the 400 metres. She competed at the 2020 Summer Olympics, in 4 × 400 m relay.

== Biography ==
Maria Chigbolu was born in Rome to an Italian mother and a Nigerian father. She has five siblings. Her grandfather Julius Chigbolu was a Nigerian athlete, who competed at the 1956 Summer Olympics, and later became president of Athletics Federation of Nigeria. She is engaged with the Italian sprinter Matteo Galvan.

== Career ==
Besides medals in the 400 metres and 4 × 400 m relays from the 2013 and 2018 Mediterranean Games, Chigbolu won a bronze in the individual event at the 2016 European Championships.

She was a member of the 2016 Olympics squad, which set the Italian national record at the 4x400 metres with a time of 3:25.16 sec.

Chigbolu took bronze medals at the 2019 World Relays (4 × 400 m), and at the 2019 European Team Championships (400 m and 4 × 400 m).

At the Italian Championships, she won 1 time in the 400 metres (2017), 8 times in the 4 × 400 m relay, and twice in the indoor relays (4 × 200 m, 4 × 400 m).

== Achievements ==
=== International competitions ===
Year	Competition	Venue	Position	Event	Time	Notes
2013	Mediterranean Games	Mersin, Turkey	2nd	400 m	52.66	PB
2013	Mediterranean Games	Mersin, Turkey	1st	4 × 400 m	3.32.44	SB
2013	World Championships	Moscow, Russia	DQ (final)	4 × 400 m	DQ	170.6 (Note: Finishing the race without the baton)
2014	European Championships	Zürich, Switzerland	7th	4 × 400 m	3:31.31	(Note: Time from the heats; Chigbolu was replaced in the final)
2015	European Indoor Championships	Prague, Czech Republic	(heats)	400 m	54.17	
2015	World Championships	Beijing, China	(heats)	400 m	52.48	
2015	World Championships	Beijing, China	(heats)	4 × 400 m	3:27.07	SB
2015	DécaNation	Paris, France	5th	400 m	52.81	
2016	European Championships	Amsterdam, Netherlands	(semifinals)	400 m	52.69	
2016	European Championships	Amsterdam, Netherlands	3rd	4 × 400 m	3:27.49	SB
2016	Olympic Games	Rio de Janeiro, Brazil	(heats)	400 m	52.06	
2016	Olympic Games	Rio de Janeiro, Brazil	5th	4 × 400 m	3.27.05	(NR h (Note: Italian squad set the national record in the heats with a time of 3:25.16 sec. It would have been 3rd result in the final))
2017	European Indoor Championships	Belgrade, Serbia	4th	4 × 400 m	3:32.87	
2017	European Team Championships	Lille, France	4th	400 m	52.36	
2017	World Championships	London, United Kingdom	(heats)	400 m	53.00	
2017	World Championships	London, United Kingdom	(heats)	4 × 400 m	3:27.81	SB
2018	Mediterranean Games	Tarragona, Spain	3rd	400 m	52.14	
2018	Mediterranean Games	Tarragona, Spain	1st	4 × 400 m	3:28.08	GR
2018	European Championships	Berlin, Germany	(semifinals)	400 m	52.26	(Note: Chigbolu clocked season's best time of 51.76 sec in the heats)
2018	European Championships	Berlin, Germany	5th	4 × 400 m	3:28.62	
2019	IAAF World Relays	Yokohama, Japan	3rd	4 × 400 m	3:27.74	SB
2019	European Team Championships	Bydgoszcz, Poland	3rd	400 m	52.19	
2019	European Team Championships	Bydgoszcz, Poland	3rd	4 × 400 m	3:27.32	SB
2019	World Championships	Doha, Qatar	(heats)	400 m	52.63	
2019	World Championships	Doha, Qatar	(heats)	4 × 400 m	3:27.57	

=== National individual competitions ===
- Italian Championships
  - 400 m: (1) 2017

== See also ==
- Italian all-time lists - 400 metres
- Italian national track relay team
