= Rebecca Borga =

Italian sprinter

- Borga at the 83rd Venice International Film Festival in 2026

Personal information
- National team: Italy (4 caps)
- Born: 11 June 1998 (age 28) Treviso, Italy
- Height: 1.70 m (5 ft 7 in)
- Weight: 52 kg (115 lb)

Sport
- Country: Italy
- Sport: Athletics
- Event: Sprint
- Club: G.A. Fiamme Gialle

Achievements and titles
- Personal bests: 400 m outdoor: 52.84 (2020); 400 m indoor: 52.69 (2021)
Medal record
European Team Championships
Bronze medal – third place	2019 Bydgoszcz	4 × 400 m relay
Mediterranean U23 Championships
Gold medal – first place	2018 Jesolo	4 × 400 m relay
Silver medal – second place	2018 Jesolo	400 m

Rebecca Borga (born 11 June 1998) is an Italian sprinter, specializing in the 400 metres. She competed at the 2020 Summer Olympics, in 4 × 400 m relay.

== Biography ==
At the senior level, Borga won a bronze medal with the 4 × 400 m relay team in the European Athletics Team Championships (2019) and an Italian indoor title in the 400 m (2021). At the under-23 level, she boasts two medals at the Mediterranean Games (2018).

== Achievements ==
Senior level

Year	Competition	Venue	Position	Event	Time	Notes
2021	European Indoor Championships	(Poland) Toruń	4th	4 × 400 metres relay	3:30.32	NR
2025	World Relays	(China) Guangzhou	5th	4 × 400 m relay	3:26.40	

== National records ==
- 4 × 400 metres relay indoor: 3:30.32 ( (Poland) Toruń, 7 March 2021 with Eloisa Coiro, Alice Mangione, Eleonora Marchiando) Current holder

== National titles ==
- Italian Athletics Indoor Championships
  - 400 metres: 2021

== See also ==
- Italian national track relay team
