= Vladimir Aceti =

Italian sprinter (born 1998)

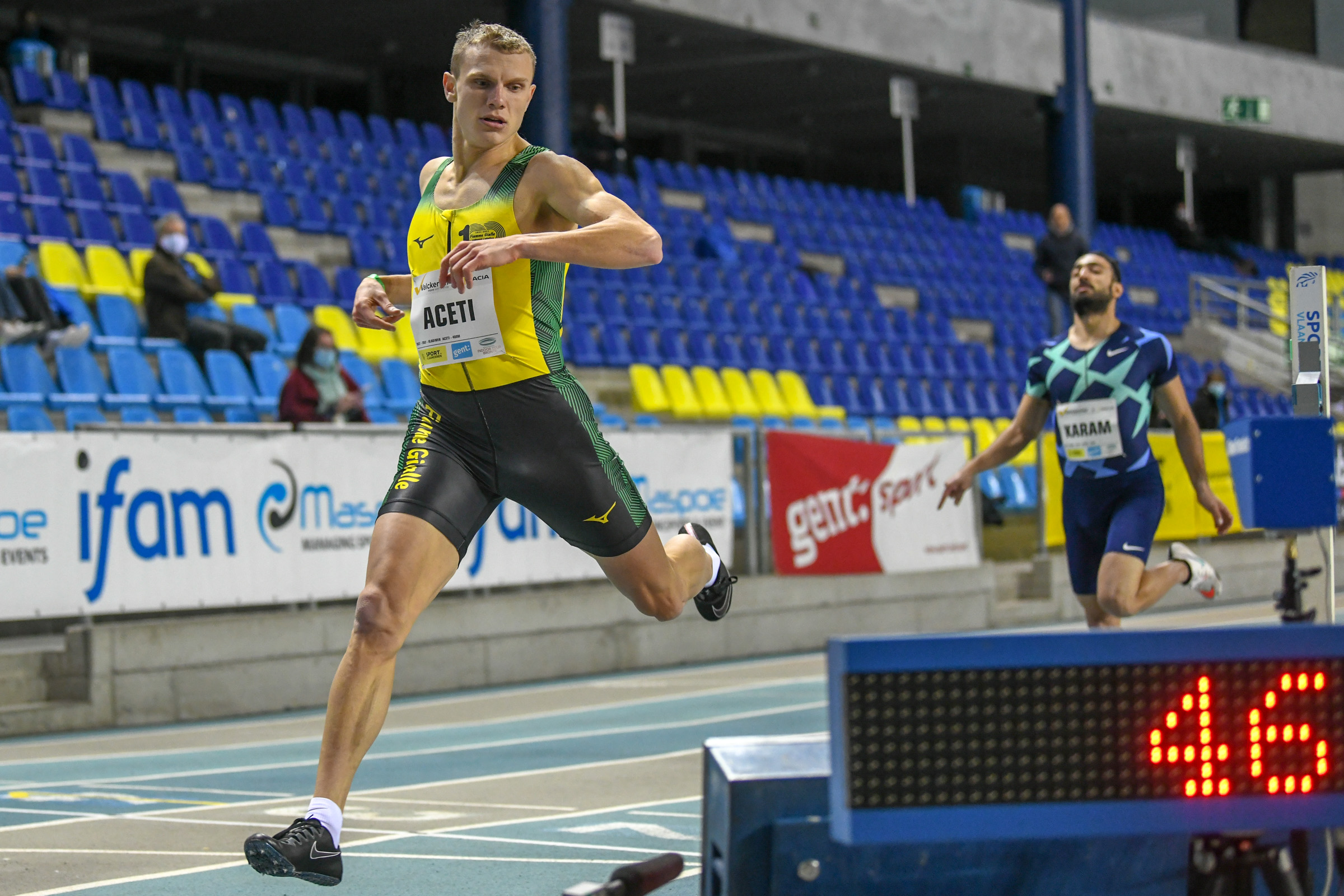
- Aceti at the 2021 Indoor Flanders Meeting

Personal information
- National team: Italy: 7 caps (2019-2021)
- Born: 16 October 1998 (age 27) Petrozavodsk, Republic of Karelia, Russian Federation
- Height: 1.81 m (5 ft 11 in)
- Weight: 73 kg (161 lb)

Sport
- Sport: Athletics
- Event: Sprint
- Club: G.S. Fiamme Gialle
- Coached by: Alessandro Simonelli
- Personal best: 400 m: 45.58 (2021)
Medal record
Men's athletics
Representing Italy
European Championships
Silver medal – second place	2024 Rome	4 × 400 m relay
European Junior Championships
Gold medal – first place	2017 Grosseto	4 × 400 m relay
Gold medal – first place	2017 Grosseto	400 metres

Vladimir Aceti (born 16 October 1998) is an Italian sprinter, specialized in the 400 metres. He competed at the 2020 Summer Olympics, in 4 × 400 m relay.

== Biography ==
Vladimir Aceti was born in Petrozavodsk. He was adopted by an Italian family when he was 5.

His first club was Atletica Vis Nova of Giussano. On 27 May 2017, he established his personal best in Oordegem at 46.30, the second best ever for an Italian junior. On 2 July 2017, he finished second during Italian Championships in Trieste, with 46.40. On 22 July 2017, he established the New Junior National Record, winning the gold medal at 2017 European Championships U20 in Grosseto, and also the gold medal in the race of 4 × 400 m (WU20L).

== Achievements ==
Year	Competition	Venue	Position	Event	Time	Notes
2017	European Junior Championships	(Italy) Grosseto	1st	4 × 400 m relay	3:08.68	(WU20L)
2019	European Indoor Championships	(United Kingdom) Glasgow	6th	4 × 400 m relay	3:09.48	

== National titles ==
- Italian Athletics Indoor Championships
  - 400 metres: 2021

== See also ==
- Italian national track relay team
