= Giancarla Trevisan =

Italian sprinter

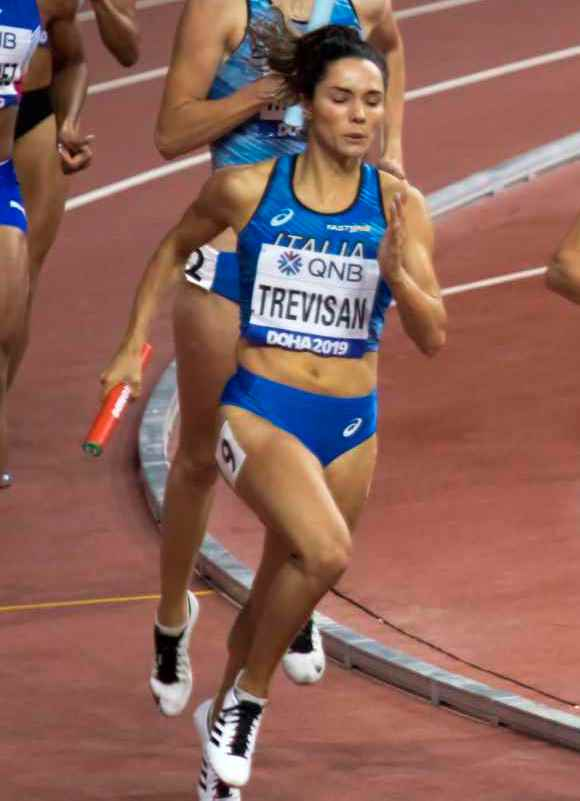

Personal information
- Full name: Giancarla Dimich Trevisan
- Nickname: Gia
- National team: Italy (10 caps)
- Born: 17 February 1993 (age 33) Laguna Niguel, California, U.S.
- Height: 1.64 m (5 ft 5 in)
- Weight: 53 kg (117 lb)

Sport
- Country: Italy
- Sport: Athletics
- Event: 400 metres

Achievements and titles
- Personal best: 400 m: 52.46 (2021)
Medal record
World Athletics Relays
| Gold medal – first place | 2021 Silesia | Mixed 4×400 m relay |
| Bronze medal – third place | 2019 Yokohama | Mixed 4×400 m relay |
European Team Championships
| Bronze medal – third place | 2019 Bydgoszcz | 4x400 m relay |
Mediterranean Games
| Gold medal – first place | 2022 Oran | 4×400 m relay |

Giancarla Trevisan (born 17 February 1993) is an American-born Italian female sprinter who won one national title at senior level. She also won two bronze medals at international senior level with the Italian national track relay team.

== Biography ==
Her father is Italian migrated in USA. Opted from Italian citizenship from 2017. She lives in Los Angeles with her American husband Corey Butler, married in the spring of 2018.

== National records ==
- 4x400 metres relay: 3:23.86 Budapest, Hungary, 26 August 2023) - current holder with Alice Mangione, Ayomide Folorunso, Alessandra Bonora
- Mixed 4 × 400 metres relay: 3:16.15, Yokohama, 11 May 2019 (Davide Re, Giancarla Trevisan, Andrew Howe, Raphaela Lukudo); current holder

== Achievements ==
| Year | Competition | Venue | Position | Event | Measure | Notes |
|---|---|---|---|---|---|---|
| 2019 | IAAF World Relays | (Japan) Yokohama | 3rd | 4×400 m relay | 3:27.64 | SB |
| 2019 | European Team Championships | (Poland) Bydgoszcz | 3rd | 4×400 m relay | 3:27.32 | SB |
| 2023 | World Championships | (Hungary) Budapest | 7th | 4×400 m relay | 3:24.98 | (Note: NR 3:23.86 in heat) |

== National titles ==
- Italian Athletics Championships
  - 400 m: 2019

== See also ==
- Italian all-time top lists – 4×400 metres relay
- Naturalized athletes of Italy
