= Raphaela Lukudo =

Italian sprinter (born 1994)

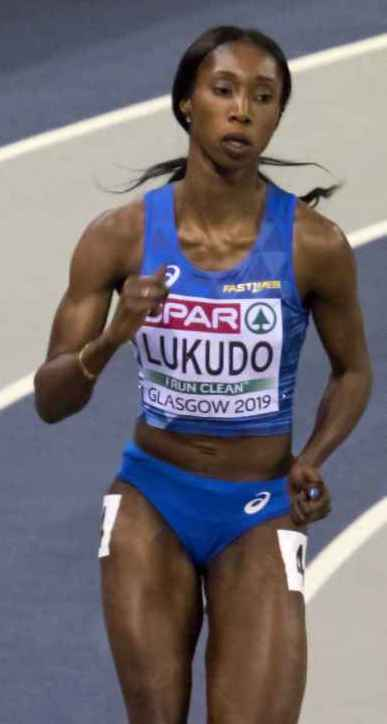
- Raphaela Boaheng Lukudo at the 2019 European Athletics Indoor Championships.

Personal information
- Full name: Raphaela Boaheng Lukudo
- National team: Italy
- Born: 29 July 1994 (age 31) Aversa, Italy
- Height: 1.69 m (5 ft 7 in)
- Weight: 52 kg (115 lb)

Sport
- Sport: Athletics
- Event: Sprinting
- Club: C.S. Esercito

Achievements and titles
- Personal best: 400 m: 52.65 (2018)
Medal record
IAAF World Relays
Bronze medal – third place	2019 Yokohama	4 × 400 m relay
European Indoor Championships
Bronze medal – third place	2019 Glasgow	4 × 400 m relay
European Team Championships
Bronze medal – third place	2021 Silesia	4 × 400 m relay
Mediterranean Games
Gold medal – first place	2018 Tarragona	4 × 400 m relay
Gold medal – first place	2022 Oran	4 × 400 m relay

Raphaela Boaheng Lukudo (born 29 July 1994) is an Italian sprinter specialized in the 400 m, who won four medals at international senior level with Italian national track relay team of the 4 × 400 m relay.

== Biography ==
Born in Aversa, Italy to Sudanese parents, she moved to Modena at the age of two. In 2006, she started to practice athletics with Mollificio Modenese Cittadella under the guidance of Mario Romano. She took part in the 2011 World Youth Championships in Athletics, for her first time with the Italy national athletics team, in Lille conquering the 400-meter semi-final despite an injury close to the competition. She competed in the women's 400 metres at the 2018 IAAF World Indoor Championships. Than, always in 2018 she won a gold medal, with the national track relay team at the 2018 Mediterranean Games.

== Achievements ==
Senior level

Year	Competition	Venue	Position	Event	Time	Notes
2018	World Indoor Championships	(United Kingdom) Birmingham	Semi	400 m	53.18	
2018	World Indoor Championships	(United Kingdom) Birmingham	5th	4 × 400 m relay	3:31.55	NR
2018	Mediterranean Games	(Spain) Tarragona	1st	4 × 400 m relay	3:28.08	GR
2019	European Indoor Championships	(United Kingdom) Glasgow	3rd	4 × 400 m relay	3:31.90	
2019	IAAF World Relays	(Japan) Yokohama	3rd	4 × 400 m relay	3:27.64	SB
2021	European Team Championships (SL)	(Poland) Chorzów	3rd	4 × 400 m relay	3:29.05	

== National records ==
- 4 × 400 metres relay indoor: 3:31.55 (Birmingham, England, 4 March 2018 with Ayomide Folorunso, Chiara Bazzoni, Maria Enrica Spacca)
- Mixed 4 × 400 metres relay: 3:16.15 (Yokohama, Japan, 11 May 2019 with Davide Re, Giancarla Trevisan, Andrew Howe); current holder

== National titles ==
- Italian Athletics Indoor Championships
  - 400 metres: 2018, 2019

== See also ==
- List of Italian records in athletics
- List of Mediterranean Games records in athletics
- Naturalized athletes of Italy
- Italian national track relay team
