= Giuseppe Leonardi =

Italian sprinter (born 1996)

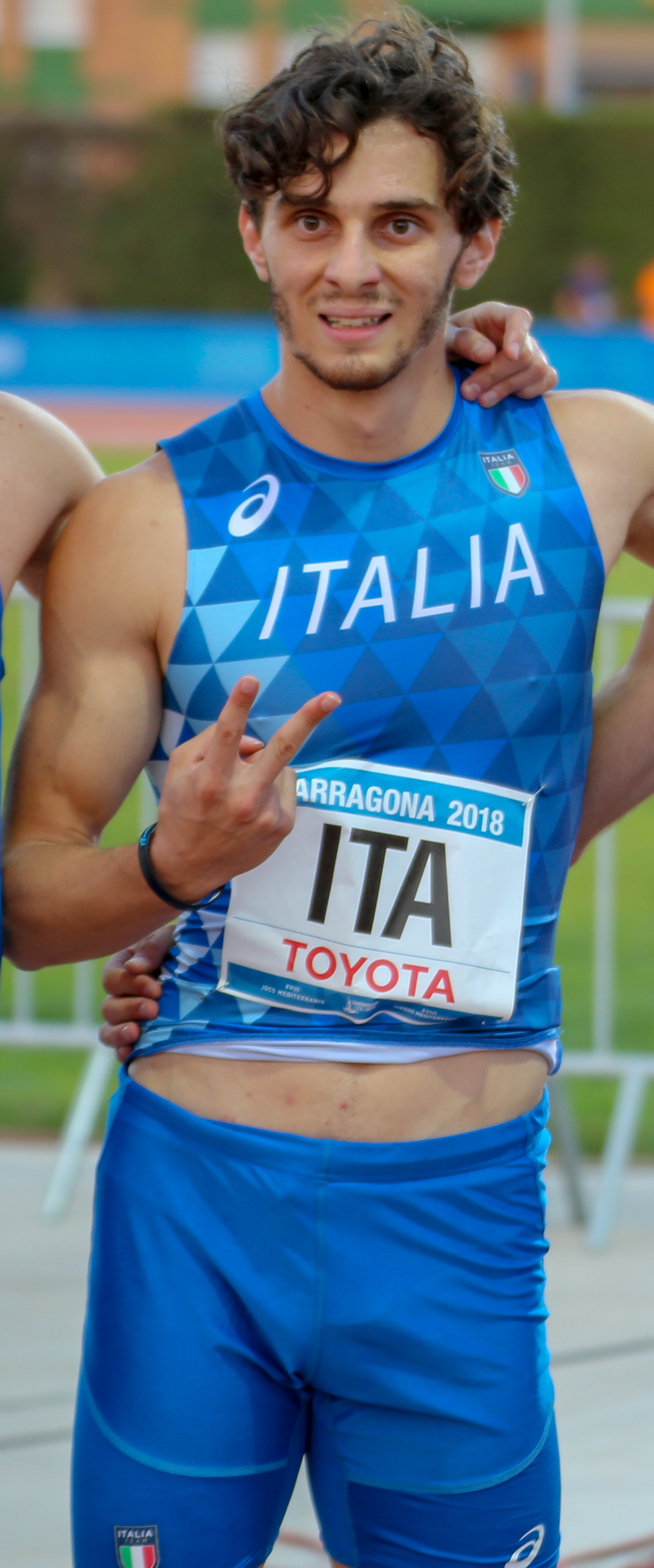

Personal information
- National team: Italy
- Born: 31 July 1996 (age 29) Catania, Italy
- Height: 1.88 m (6 ft 2 in)
- Weight: 76 kg (168 lb)

Sport
- Sport: Athletics
- Event: 400 m
- Club: G.S. Carabinieri
- Coached by: Filippo Di Mulo

Achievements and titles
- Personal best: 400 m: 46.19 (2017)

Giuseppe Leonardi (born 31 July 1996) is an Italian sprinter, selected to be part of the Italian athletics team for the Tokyo 2020 Olympics, as a possible member of the relay team.
