= Azerbaijan at the 2026 European Athletics Championships =

- Flag of Azerbaijan
- WA code: AZE

in Birmingham, United Kingdom 10–16 August 2026
- Competitors: 2 (1 man and 1 woman)
- Medals: Gold 0 Silver 0 Bronze 0 Total 0

European Athletics Championships appearances
- 2002; 2006; 2010; 2012; 2014; 2016; 2018; 2022; 2024; 2026

Other related appearances
- Soviet Union (1946–1990)

Azerbaijan competed at the 2026 European Athletics Championships in Birmingham, United Kingdom from 10–16 August 2026.

== Results ==
Azerbaijan entered the following athletes.

Key

- Q = Qualified for the next round
- q = Qualified for the next round as a fastest loser or, in field events, by position without achieving the qualifying target
- NR = National record
- PB = Personal best
- SB = Season best
- N/A = Round not applicable for the event

Field events

Athlete	Event	Qualification		Final	
Athlete	Event	Distance	Position	Distance	Position
Rustam Mammadov	Men's triple jump	15.71	19	Did not advance	
Yekaterina Sariyeva	Women's triple jump	13.91 NR	16	Did not advance	
