= Great Britain and Northern Ireland at the 2018 European Athletics Championships =

- WA code: GBR
- National federation: UKA
- Website: www.britishathletics.org.uk

in Berlin
- Competitors: 102 (46 men and 56 women) in 40 events
- Medals: Gold 7 Silver 5 Bronze 6 Total 18

European Athletics Championships appearances
- 1934; 1938; 1946; 1950; 1954; 1958; 1962; 1966; 1969; 1971; 1974; 1978; 1982; 1986; 1990; 1994; 1998; 2002; 2006; 2010; 2012; 2014; 2016; 2018; 2022; 2024; 2026

The United Kingdom competed under the team name of Great Britain and Northern Ireland at the 2018 European Athletics Championships in Berlin, Germany, from 6-12 August 2018. British Athletics named a team of 102 athletes on 24 July 2018, the largest British team sent to an athletics competition since the 1908 Olympic Games. Alyson Dixon was selected for the marathon, but withdrew due to injury. Dai Greene was voted to be the captain of the team, but he withdrew from competition due to injury on the first day of championships.

== Medals ==
Medal	Name	Event	Date
Gold	Dina Asher-Smith	Women's 100 metres	7 August
Gold	Zharnel Hughes	Men's 100 metres	7 August
Gold	Matt Hudson-Smith	Men's 400 metres	10 August
Gold	Dina Asher-Smith	Women's 200 metres	11 August
Gold	Laura Muir	Women's 1500 metres	12 August
Gold	Asha Philip; Imani-Lara Lansiquot; Bianca Williams; Dina Asher-Smith; Daryll Neita*	Women's 4 × 100 metres relay	12 August
Gold	CJ Ujah; Zharnel Hughes; Adam Gemili; Harry Aikines-Aryeetey; Nethaneel Mitchell-Blake*	Men's 4 x 100 metres relay	12 August
Silver	Reece Prescod	Men's 100 metres	7 August
Silver	Nethaneel Mitchell-Blake	Men's 200 metres	9 August
Silver	Katarina Johnson-Thompson	Heptathlon	10 August
Silver	Rabah Yousif; Dwayne Cowan; Matthew Hudson-Smith; Martyn Rooney	Men's 4 x 400 metres relay	11 August
Silver	Eilish McColgan	Women's 5000m	12 August
Bronze	Holly Bradshaw	Women's pole vault	9 August
Bronze	Meghan Beesley	Women's 400 metres hurdles	10 August
Bronze	Jake Wightman	Men's 1500 metres	10 August
Bronze	Shara Proctor	Women's long jump	11 August
Bronze	Zoey Clark; Anyika Onuora; Amy Allcock; Eilidh Doyle; Finette Agyapong*; Emily Diamond*; Mary Abichi*	Women's 4 x 400 metres relay	11 August
Bronze	Laura Weightman	Women's 1500 metres	12 August

== Results ==
=== Men ===
Track & road events

Athlete	Event	Heat		Semifinal		Final	
Athlete	Event	Result	Rank	Result	Rank	Result	Rank
Zharnel Hughes	100 m	Bye		10.01	1 Q	9.95 CR	1st place, gold medalist(s)
Reece Prescod	100 m	Bye		10.10	2 Q	9.96 PB	2nd place, silver medalist(s)
CJ Ujah	100 m	Bye		10.14	2 Q	10.06	4
Adam Gemili	200 m	Bye		20.46	3 q	20.10	5
Nethaneel Mitchell-Blake	200 m	Bye		20.35	2 Q	20.04	2nd place, silver medalist(s)
Delano Williams	200 m	20.89	3 Q	DNS	—N/a	Did not advance	
Dwayne Cowan	400 m	45.75	1 Q	45.45	5	Did not advance	
Matthew Hudson-Smith	400 m	Bye		44.76	1 Q	44.78	1st place, gold medalist(s)
Martyn Rooney	400 m	46.27	3 Q	45.73	6	Did not advance	
Rabah Yousif	400 m	Bye		45.30	3	Did not advance	
Elliot Giles	800 m	1:48.05	3 Q	1:47.40	7	Did not advance	
Guy Learmonth	800 m	1:46.75	5 q	1:46.83	5	Did not advance	
Daniel Rowden	800 m	1:46.59	3 Q	1:46.98	6	Did not advance	
Charlie Grice	1500 m	3:40.80	2 Q	—N/a		3:38.65	5
Chris O'Hare	1500 m	3:49.06	1 Q	—N/a		3:39.53	9
Jake Wightman	1500 m	3:40.73	1 Q	—N/a		3:38.25	3rd place, bronze medalist(s)
Ben Connor	5000 m	—N/a				13:25.31 PB	12
Marc Scott	5000 m	—N/a				13:23.14	6
Chris Thompson	5000 m	—N/a				13:25.11	10
Chris Thompson	10000 m	—N/a				28:33.12	11
Andy Vernon	10000 m	—N/a				28:16.90	5
Alex Yee	10000 m	—N/a				28:58.86	14
David King	110 m hurdles	13.65	2 Q	13.55	6	Did not advance	
Andrew Pozzi	110 m hurdles	Bye		13.28	2 Q	13.48	6
Jack Green	400 m hurdles	Bye		49.84	6	Did not advance	
Dai Greene	400 m hurdles	DNS	—N/a	Did not advance			
Sebastian Rodger	400 m hurdles	51.30	5	Did not advance			
Jamaine Coleman	3000 m steeplechase	8:33.78	8	—N/a		Did not advance	
Zak Seddon	3000 m steeplechase	8:30.00	7 q	—N/a		8:37.28	5
Ieuan Thomas	3000 m steeplechase	8:40.87	10	—N/a		Did not advance	
Harry Aikines-Aryeetey; Adam Gemili; Zharnel Hughes; CJ Ujah; Nethaneel Mitchell-Blake (heat only)	4 × 100 m relay	37.84	1 Q	—N/a		37.80	1st place, gold medalist(s)
Dwayne Cowan; Matthew Hudson-Smith; Martyn Rooney; Rabah Yousif; Cameron Chalmers (heat only)	4 × 400 m relay	3:01.62	1 Q	—N/a		3:00.36	2nd place, silver medalist(s)
Tom Bosworth	20 km walk	—N/a				1:21.31	7
Callum Wilkinson	20 km walk	—N/a				DSQ	

Field Events

Athlete	Event	Qualification		Final	
Athlete	Event	Distance	Rank	Distance	Rank
Dan Bramble	Long jump	7.89	5 q	7.90	7
Feron Sayers	Long jump	7.68	15	Did not advance	
Nathan Douglas	Triple jump	16.56	8 q	16.71	6
Chris Baker	High jump	2.21	10	Did not advance	
Allan Smith	High jump	2.21	6	Did not advance	
David Smith	High jump	2.16	9	Did not advance	
Adam Hague	Pole vault	5.61 PB	4 q	5.65 PB	10
Charlie Myers	Pole vault	5.36	10	Did not advance	
Chris Bennett	Hammer throw	70.57	24	Did not advance	
Nick Miller	Hammer throw	73.79	11 q	73.16	10

Combined events – Decathlon

Athlete	Event	100 m	LJ	SP	HJ	400 m	110H	DT	PV	JT	1500 m	Final	Rank
Tim Duckworth	Result	10.65	7.57	13.61	2.17	49.87	14.55	41.94	5.10	54.78	4:58.28	8160	5
Tim Duckworth	Points	940	952	704	963	821	905	704	941	660	570	8160	5

=== Women ===
Track & road events

Athlete	Event	Heat		Semifinal		Final	
Athlete	Event	Result	Rank	Result	Rank	Result	Rank
Dina Asher-Smith	100 m	Bye		10.93	1 Q	10.85 NR	1st place, gold medalist(s)
Imani-Lara Lansiquot	100 m	Bye		11.14	3 q	11.14	6
Daryll Neita	100 m	11.48	4 q	11.27	4	Did not advance	
Dina Asher-Smith	200 m	Bye		22.33	1 Q	21.89 NR	1st place, gold medalist(s)
Beth Dobbin	200 m	Bye		22.84	2 Q	22.93	7
Bianca Williams	200 m	Bye		22.83	3 q	22.88	6
Jodie Williams	200 m	Bye		23.28	5	Did not advance	
Amy Allcock	400 m	Bye		51.91	6	Did not advance	
Laviai Nielsen	400 m	51.67 PB	1 Q	51.21 PB	1 Q	51.21	4
Anyika Onuora	400 m	Bye		51.77	3	Did not advance	
Shelayna Oskan-Clarke	800 m	2:04.08	2 Q	2:00.39	4 q	2:02.26	8
Lynsey Sharp	800 m	2:00.32	2 Q	2:02.73	2 Q	2:01.83	6
Adelle Tracey	800 m	2:01.91	1 Q	1:59.86 PB	2 Q	2:00.26	4
Laura Muir	1500 m	4:09.12	1 Q	—N/a		4:02.32	1st place, gold medalist(s)
Jemma Reekie	1500 m	4:10.35	8	—N/a		Did not advance	
Laura Weightman	1500 m	4:08.74	2 Q	—N/a		4:03.75	3rd place, bronze medalist(s)
Melissa Courtney	5000 m	—N/a				15:04.75	6
Eilish McColgan	5000 m	—N/a				14:53.05	2nd place, silver medalist(s)
Stephanie Twell	5000 m	—N/a				15:41.10	11
Charlotte Arter	10000 m	—N/a				DNS	—N/a
Alice Wright	10000 m	—N/a				32:36.45	6
Meghan Beesley	400 m hurdles	Bye		55.21	3 q	55.31	3rd place, bronze medalist(s)
Eilidh Doyle	400 m hurdles	Bye		55.16	1 Q	56.23	8
Kirsten McAslan	400 m hurdles	56.78	2 Q	57.33	7	Did not advance	
Rosie Clarke	3000 m steeplechase	9:33.78	4 Q	—N/a		9:32.15	10
Tracey Barlow	Marathon	—N/a				2:35.00	15
Caryl Jones	Marathon	—N/a				2:40.41	30
Lily Partridge	Marathon	—N/a				DNF	
Charlotte Purdue	Marathon	—N/a				DNF	
Sonia Samuels	Marathon	—N/a				2:37.36	21
Great Britain	Marathon Team	—N/a				7:53.16	4
Dina Asher-Smith; Imani-Lara Lansiquot; Asha Philip; Bianca Williams; Daryll Neita (heat only)	4 × 100 m relay	42.19	1 Q	—N/a		41.88	1st place, gold medalist(s)
Amy Allcock; Zoey Clark; Eilidh Doyle; Anyika Onuora; Mary Abichi (heat only); Finette Agyapong (heat only); Emily Diamond (heat only)	4 × 400 m relay	3:28.12	2 Q	—N/a		3:27.40	3rd place, bronze medalist(s)
Gemma Bridge	20 km walk	—N/a				DNS	—N/a
Bethan Davies	20 km walk	—N/a				1:36.50	22
Heather Lewis	20 km walk	—N/a				DSQ	

Field Events

Athlete	Event	Qualification		Final	
Athlete	Event	Distance	Rank	Distance	Rank
Shara Proctor	Long jump	6.75	2 Q	6.70	3rd place, bronze medalist(s)
Jazmin Sawyers	Long jump	6.64	9 q	6.67	4
Lorraine Ugen	Long jump	6.70	4 Q	6.45	9
Naomi Ogbeta	Triple jump	14.15 PB	11 Q	13.94	12
Morgan Lake	High jump	1.90	1 q	1.91	7
Nikki Manson	High jump	1.81	9	Did not advance	
Holly Bradshaw	Pole vault	4.50	2 q	4.75	3rd place, bronze medalist(s)
Lucy Bryan	Pole vault	4.35	6	Did not advance	
Molly Caudery	Pole vault	4.20	13	Did not advance	
Sophie McKinna	Shot put	17.24	10 Q	17.69	7
Divine Oladipo	Shot put	15.78	21	Did not advance	
Amelia Strickler	Shot put	17.31 PB	9 Q	17.15	10
Eden Francis	Discus throw	DNS	—N/a	Did not advance	
Jade Lally	Discus throw	57.71	11 q	57.33	11
Kirsty Law	Discus throw	52.37	26	Did not advance	
Sophie Hitchon	Hammer throw	68.69	11 q	70.52	8

Combined events – Heptathlon

Athlete	Event	100H	HJ	SP	200 m	LJ	JT	800 m	Final	Rank
Katarina Johnson-Thompson	Result	13.34	1.91	13.09	22.88	6.68	42.16	2:09.84	6759 PB	2nd place, silver medalist(s)
Katarina Johnson-Thompson	Points	1074	1119	733	1091	1066	709	967	6759 PB	2nd place, silver medalist(s)

Key

- Q = Qualified for the next round
- q = Qualified for the next round as a fastest loser or, in field events, by position without achieving the qualifying target
- N/A = Round not applicable for the event
- Bye = Athlete not required to compete in round

== See also ==
- Great Britain and Northern Ireland at the 2018 European Championships
