= Azerbaijan at the 2022 European Athletics Championships =

- Flag of Azerbaijan
- WA code: AZE
- National federation: Azerbaijan Athletics Federation

in Munich, Germany 15 August 2022 – 21 August 2022
- Competitors: 4 (2 men and 2 women) in 3 events
- Medals: Gold 0 Silver 0 Bronze 0 Total 0

European Athletics Championships appearances
- 2002; 2006; 2010; 2012; 2014; 2016; 2018; 2022; 2024; 2026

Other related appearances
- Soviet Union (1946–1990)

Azerbaijan competed at the 2022 European Athletics Championships in Munich, Germany, between 15 and 21 August 2022

== Results ==
Azerbaijan entered the following athletes.

Key

- Q = Qualified for the next round
- q = Qualified for the next round as a fastest loser or, in field events, by position without achieving the qualifying target
- NR = National record
- PB = Personal best
- SB = Season best
- N/A = Round not applicable for the event

=== Men ===
Field events

Athlete	Event	Qualification		Final	
Athlete	Event	Distance	Position	Distance	Position
Nazim Babayev	Triple jump	NM		did not advance	
Alexis Copello	Triple jump	NM		did not advance	

=== Women ===
Field events

Athlete	Event	Qualification		Final	
Athlete	Event	Distance	Position	Distance	Position
Yekaterina Sariyeva	Triple jump	13.66	13	did not advance	
Hanna Skydan	Hammer throw	74.57 SB	1 Q	70.88	4
