= Ukraine at the 2018 European Athletics Championships =

- Flag of Ukraine
- WA code: UKR
- National federation: Ukrainian Athletic Federation

in Berlin, Germany 6 August 2018 – 12 August 2018
- Competitors: 81 (36 men and 45 women)
- Medals: Gold 2 Silver 2 Bronze 3 Total 7

European Athletics Championships appearances
- 1994; 1998; 2002; 2006; 2010; 2012; 2014; 2016; 2018; 2022; 2024; 2026

Other related appearances
- Soviet Union (1946–1990)

Ukraine competed at the 2018 European Athletics Championships in Berlin, Germany, between 6 and 12 August 2018.

== Medallists ==
Medal	Name	Event	Date
Gold	Maryan Zakalnytskyy	Men's 50 kilometres walk	7 August
Gold	Nataliya Pryshchepa	Women's 800 metres	10 August
Silver	Hanna Ryzhykova	Women's 400 metres hurdles	10 August
Silver	Maryna Bekh	Women's long jump	11 August
Bronze	Serhiy Nykyforov	Men's long jump	8 August
Bronze	Olha Lyakhova	Women's 800 metres	10 August
Bronze	Khrystyna Yudkina	Women's 50 kilometres walk	7 August

== Results ==
Ukraine entered the following athletes.

Key

- Q = Qualified for the next round
- q = Qualified for the next round as a fastest loser or, in field events, by position without achieving the qualifying target
- NR = National record
- PB = Personal best
- SB = Season best
- N/A = Round not applicable for the event

=== Men ===
Track and road events

Athlete	Event	Heat		Semifinal		Final	
Athlete	Event	Result	Rank	Result	Rank	Result	Rank
Oleksandr Sokolov	100 m	10.43	18	Did not advance			
Emil Ibrahimov	200 m	21.29	=35	Did not advance			
Serhiy Smelyk	200 m	Bye		20.54	=11	Did not advance	
Vitaliy Butrym	400 m	45.82 SB	8 Q	46.01	22	Did not advance	
Oleksiy Pozdnyakov	400 m	46.47	17	Did not advance			
Stanislav Senyk	400 m	47.10	25	Did not advance			
Yevhen Hutsol	800 m	1:46.97	9 q	1:47.29	14	Did not advance	
Volodymyr Kyts	1500 m	3:52.77	29	Did not advance			
Vasyl Koval	10,000 m	—N/a				29:07.23	17
Dmytro Siruk	10,000 m	—N/a				29:19.55	21
Artem Shamatryn	110 m hurdles	14.02	25	Did not advance			
Denys Nechyporenko	400 m hurdles	50.26 SB	13 Q	50.27	17	Did not advance	
Danylo Danylenko	400 m hurdles	51.02	28	Did not advance			
Oleksandr Sokolov; Emil Ibrahimov; Volodymyr Suprun; Serhiy Smelyk	4 × 100 m relay	38.86 SB	5 Q	—N/a		38.71 SB	5
Oleksiy Pozdnyakov; Danylo Danylenko; Stanislav Senyk; Vitaliy Butrym	4 × 400 m relay	3:03.93 SB	10	Did not advance			

Marathon and race walks

Athlete	Event	Result	Rank
Ihor Olefirenko	Marathon	2:16:35	14
Oleksandr Sitkovskyy	Marathon	2:18:52	24
Ihor Russ	Marathon	2:19:39	32
Yuriy Rusyuk	Marathon	2:19:49	35
Dmytro Lashyn	Marathon	DNF	—
Ihor Olefirenko; Oleksandr Sitkovskyy; Ihor Russ; Yuriy Rusyuk	Marathon team	6:55:04	8
Viktor Shumik	20 km walk	1:22:24 PB	11
Ivan Losev	20 km walk	1:22:28	12
Oleksiy Kazanin	20 km walk	1:26:49	23
Maryan Zakalnytskyy	50 km walk	3:46:32	1st place, gold medalist(s)
Ivan Banzeruk	50 km walk	4:00:57	16
Valeriy Litanyuk	50 km walk	4:01:33	18

Field events

Athlete	Event	Qualification		Final	
Athlete	Event	Distance	Position	Distance	Position
Dmytro Dem'yanyuk	High jump	2.25	=3 q	NM	—
Andriy Protsenko	High jump	2.25	=3 q	2.24	=5
Viktor Lonskyy	High jump	2.21	=13	Did not advance	
Vladyslav Malykhin	Pole vault	5.51	16	Did not advance	
Serhiy Nykyforov	Long jump	7.86	8 q	8.13	3rd place, bronze medalist(s)
Vladyslav Mazur	Long jump	7.70	13	Did not advance	
Ihor Musiyenko	Triple jump	19.61	15	Did not advance	
Mykyta Nesterenko	Discus throw	63.34 SB	6 q	57.66	12
Hlib Piskunov	Hammer throw	74.18	10 q	74.62	7
Volodymyr Myslyvchuk	Hammer throw	70.59	23	Did not advance	
Serhiy Reheda	Hammer throw	70.39	25	Did not advance	
Yuriy Kushniruk	Javelin throw	73.79	22	Did not advance	

=== Women ===
Track and road events

Athlete	Event	Heat		Semifinal		Final	
Athlete	Event	Result	Rank	Result	Rank	Result	Rank
Hrystyna Stuy	100 m	42.66	36	Did not advance			
Alina Kalistratova	200 m	23.79	26	Did not advance			
Yana Kachur	200 m	24.00	32	Did not advance			
Yelyzaveta Bryzhina	200 m	24.21	33	Did not advance			
Tetyana Melnyk	400 m	52.44	25 q	52.20 SB	17	Did not advance	
Alina Lohvynenko	400 m	53.18	33	Did not advance			
Anastasiia Bryzgina	400 m	53.62	40	Did not advance			
Nataliya Pryshchepa	800 m	2:04.07	23 Q	2:02.71	9 Q	2:00.38	1st place, gold medalist(s)
Olha Lyakhova	800 m	2:00.26 SB	1 Q	2:00.47	5 q	2:00.79	3rd place, bronze medalist(s)
Yuliya Shmatenko	5000 m	—N/a				16:41.37	15
Yevheniya Prokofyeva	10,000 m	—N/a				34:15.81	17
Yuliya Shmatenko	10,000 m	—N/a				DNF	—
Olena Serdyuk	10,000 m	—N/a				DQ	—
Hanna Plotitsyna	100 m hurdles	13.23	27	Did not advance			
Mariya Mykolenko	400 m hurdles	56.39	15 Q	56.35	16	Did not advance	
Hanna Ryzhykova	400 m hurdles	Bye		54.82 SB	1 Q	54.51 SB	2nd place, silver medalist(s)
Viktoriya Tkachuk	400 m hurdles	Bye		55.37	7 Q	56.15	7
Nataliya Strebkova	3000 m steeplechase	9:37.28 PB	14 q	—N/a		9:40.03	12
Hanna Plotitsyna; Alina Kalistratova; Yana Kachur; Anastasiya Holeneva	4 × 100 m relay	43.90 SB	10	Did not advance			
Kateryna Klymyuk; Mariya Mykolenko; Anastasiia Bryzgina; Tetyana Melnyk	4 × 400 m relay	DQ (Rule 170.7)	2	Did not advance			

Marathon and race walks

Athlete	Event	Result	Rank
Olha Kotovska	Marathon	2:35:56	19
Darya Mykhaylova	Marathon	2:38:30 SB	25
Vira Ovcharuk	Marathon	2:46:45 SB	38
Viktoriya Khapilina	Marathon	DNF	—
Olha Kotovska; Darya Mykhaylova; Vira Ovcharuk; Viktoriya Khapilina	Marathon team	8:01:10	7
Inna Kashyna	20 km walk	1:29:16	6
Nadiya Borovska	20 km walk	1:30:38	9
Mariya Filyuk	20 km walk	1:33:34 PB	17
Khrystyna Yudkina	50 km walk	4:20:46 PB	3rd place, bronze medalist(s)
Alina Tsviliy	50 km walk	DQ	—
Vasylyna Vitovshchyk	50 km walk	DQ	—

Field events

Athlete	Event	Qualification		Final	
Athlete	Event	Distance	Position	Distance	Position
Kateryna Tabashnyk	High jump	1.90	=1 q	1.94	5
Yuliya Levchenko	High jump	1.90	=9 q	1.91	9
Oksana Okunyeva	High jump	1.86	=12 q	1.87	=10
Maryna Kylypko	Pole vault	4.45	=4 q	4.45	8
Maryna Bekh	Long jump	6.64	8 q	6.73 SB	2nd place, silver medalist(s)
Krystyna Hryshutyna	Long jump	6.31	19	Did not advance	
Olha Saladukha	Triple jump	14.04	13	Did not advance	
Hanna Krasutska	Triple jump	13.88	18	Did not advance	
Olha Holodna	Shot put	16.69	16	Did not advance	
Viktoriya Klochko	Shot put	16.27	18	Did not advance	
Viktoriya Klochko	Discus throw	49.11	28	Did not advance	
Iryna Klymets	Hammer throw	69.44	9 q	68.11	11
Iryna Novozhylova	Hammer throw	64.70	23	Did not advance	
Alyona Shamotina	Hammer throw	61.66	27	Did not advance	
Hanna Hatsko-Fedusova	Javelin throw	53.08	21	Did not advance	

Combined events – Heptathlon

Athlete	Event	100H	HJ	SP	200 m	LJ	JT	800 m	Final	Rank
Daryna Sloboda	Result	14.46 SB	1.76	13.49	25.16 SB	6.17	40.06	2:10.63	5999	14
Daryna Sloboda	Points	914	928	760	872	902	668	955	5999	14
Alina Shukh	Result	14.42	1.76	14.43 PB	26.57	5.81	51.20	2:15.09	5985	15
Alina Shukh	Points	920	928	823	748	792	883	891	5985	15
Rimma Hordiyenko	Result	13.68	1.79	13.00	25.20	5.89	41.67	2:22.23 PB	5894	17
Rimma Hordiyenko	Points	1024	966	727	869	816	699	793	5894	17
