= 2018 European Athletics Championships =

24th European Athletics Championships
- Dates: 6–12 August
- Host city: Berlin, Germany
- Venue: Olympiastadion
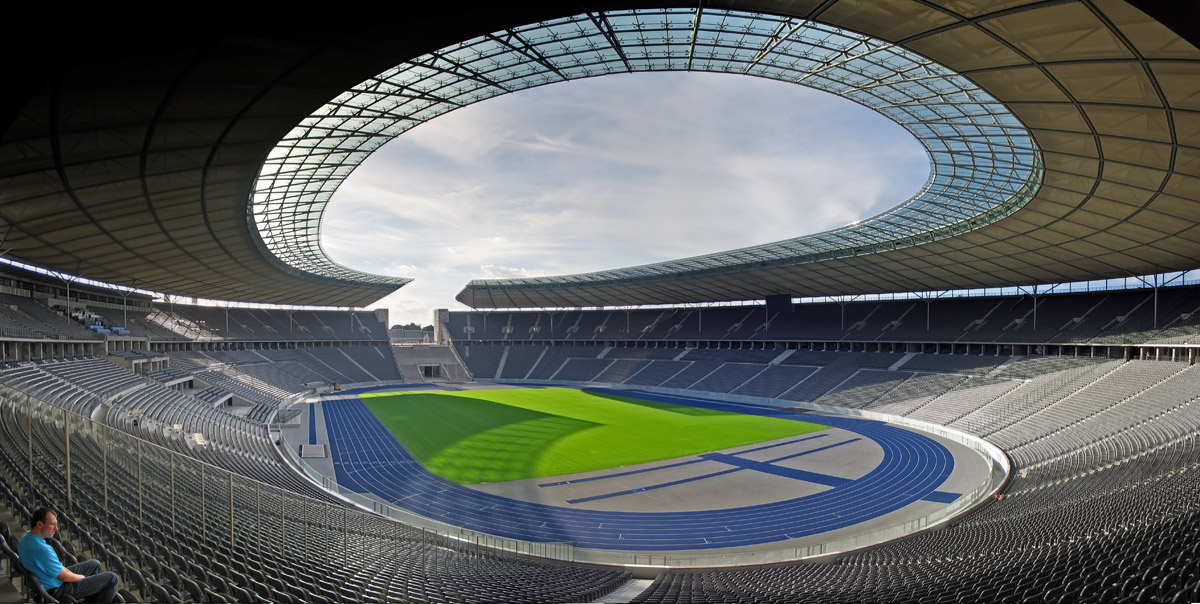
- Level: Senior
- Type: Outdoor
- Events: 48
- Participation: 1439 athletes from 49+1 nations

The 2018 European Athletics Championships were held in Berlin, Germany, from 6 to 12 August 2018. The championships were part of the first European Championships with other events happening in the United Kingdom.

For the second Championships in a row, the Russian team did not participate; this was due to the suspension of the All-Russia Athletic Federation by the International Association of Athletics Federations. However, several athletes were cleared by the IAAF to compete as Authorised Neutral Athletes under the flag of the European Athletic Association. Mariya Lasitskene became the first such athlete to win a gold medal, in the women's high jump.

== Event schedule ==
Legend
Key	P	Q	H	½	F
Value	Preliminary round	Qualifiers	Heats	Semifinals	Final

Men
Date	Aug 6	Aug 7			Aug 8		Aug 9		Aug 10			Aug 11		Aug 12		
Event	A	M	A		M	A	M	A	M	A		M	A	M	A	
100 m	H		½	F												
200 m					H	½		F								
400 m		H				½				F						
800 m							H			½			F			
1500 m					H					F						
5000 m													F			
10,000 m			F													
Marathon														F		
3000 m steeplechase		H						F								
110 m hurdles							H			½	F					
400 m hurdles	H		½					F								
Decathlon		F														
High jump								Q					F			
Pole vault									Q						F	
Long jump	Q					F										
Triple jump									Q						F	
Shot put	Q		F													
Discus throw		Q				F										
Hammer throw	Q		F													
Javelin throw					Q			F								
20 km walk												F				
50 km walk		F														
4 × 100 m relay															H	F
4 × 400 m relay									H				F			

Women
Date	Aug 6	Aug 7			Aug 8		Aug 9			Aug 10		Aug 11		Aug 12		
Event	A	M	A		M	A	M	A		M	A	M	A	M	A	
100 m	H		½	F												
200 m										H	½		F			
400 m					H			½					F			
800 m		H				½					F					
1500 m										H					F	
5000 m															F	
10,000 m						F										
Marathon														F		
3000 m steeplechase										H					F	
100 m hurdles					H			½	F							
400 m hurdles		H				½					F					
Heptathlon							F									
High jump						Q					F					
Pole vault			Q					F								
Long jump							Q						F			
Triple jump					Q						F					
Shot put		Q				F										
Discus throw							Q						F			
Hammer throw										Q					F	
Javelin throw								Q			F					
20 km walk												F				
50 km walk		F														
4 × 100 m relay															H	F
4 × 400 m relay										H			F			

== Medals awarded years later after doping cases ==
Although in April 2018, before this European Championship race in Berlin 2018, which actually took place on August 11, the Disciplinary Commission of the Czech Athletics Association (CAS) had notified the czech athlete Anežka Drahotová of an irregularity in her biological passport (doping), on 19 July 2021 (three years later), the athlete was cleared and the silver medal she won on the field was reassigned, as also confirmed by the Statistic Handbook published by the EAA on the eve of Roma 2024.

But the situation that seemed to be over took a further turn on 15 May 2025, therefore after the publication of the EAA Statistical Handbook of Rome 2024, when WADA's appeal against the acquittal ruling of July 2021 was accepted and at this point the EAA rewrote the competition rankings, once again excluding Drahotova from the rankings. As a result, the Italian Antonella Palmisano moves from bronze to silver while the bronze medal is awarded to the Lithuanian Živilė Vaiciukevičiūtė who came in 4th.

== Results ==
=== Men ===
==== Track ====
Chronology: 2014 | 2016 | 2018 | 2020 | 2022

Event	Gold		Silver		Bronze	
100 metres	Zharnel Hughes; Great Britain & N.I. (GBR)	9.95 CR	Reece Prescod; Great Britain & N.I. (GBR)	9.96	Jak Ali Harvey; Turkey (TUR)	10.01
200 metres	Ramil Guliyev; Turkey (TUR)	19.76 CR	Nethaneel Mitchell-Blake; Great Britain & N.I. (GBR)	20.04	Alex Wilson; Switzerland (SUI)	20.04 NR
400 metres	Matthew Hudson-Smith; Great Britain & N.I. (GBR)	44.78	Kevin Borlée; Belgium (BEL)	45.13	Jonathan Borlée; Belgium (BEL)	45.19
800 metres	Adam Kszczot; Poland (POL)	1:44.59	Andreas Kramer; Sweden (SWE)	1:45.03 =NR	Pierre-Ambroise Bosse; France (FRA)	1:45.30
1500 metres	Jakob Ingebrigtsen; Norway (NOR)	3:38.10	Marcin Lewandowski; Poland (POL)	3:38.14	Jake Wightman; Great Britain & N.I. (GBR)	3:38.25
5000 metres	Jakob Ingebrigtsen; Norway (NOR)	13:17.06	Henrik Ingebrigtsen; Norway (NOR)	13:18.75	Morhad Amdouni; France (FRA)	13:19.14
10,000 metres	Morhad Amdouni; France (FRA)	28:11.22	Bashir Abdi; Belgium (BEL)	28:11.76	Yemaneberhan Crippa; Italy (ITA)	28:12.15
Marathon	Koen Naert; Belgium (BEL)	2:09:51 CR PB	Tadesse Abraham; Switzerland (SUI)	2:11:24	Yassine Rachik; Italy (ITA)	2:12:09 PB
Marathon	Italy	6:40:48	Spain	6:42:43	Austria	6:49:29
110 metres hurdles	Pascal Martinot-Lagarde; France (FRA)	13.17	Sergey Shubenkov; Authorised Neutral Athletes (ANA)	13.17	Orlando Ortega; Spain (ESP)	13.34
400 metres hurdles	Karsten Warholm; Norway (NOR)	47.64	Yasmani Copello; Turkey (TUR)	47.81	Thomas Barr; Ireland (IRL)	48.31
3000 metres steeplechase	Mahiedine Mekhissi-Benabbad; France (FRA)	8:31.66	Fernando Carro; Spain (ESP)	8:34.16	Yohanes Chiappinelli; Italy (ITA)	8:35.81
4 × 100 metres relay	Great Britain & N.I. Chijindu Ujah; Zharnel Hughes; Adam Gemili; Harry Aikines-Aryeetey; Nethaneel Mitchell-Blake*	37.80	Turkey; Emre Zafer Barnes; Jak Ali Harvey; Yiğitcan Hekimoğlu; Ramil Guliyev	37.98	Netherlands; Chris Garia; Churandy Martina; Hensley Paulina; Taymir Burnet	38.03
4 × 400 metres relay	Belgium; Dylan Borlée; Jonathan Borlée; Jonathan Sacoor; Kévin Borlée; Robin Vanderbemden*; Julien Watrin*	2:59.47 EL	Great Britain & N.I. Rabah Yousif; Dwayne Cowan; Matthew Hudson-Smith; Martyn Rooney; Cameron Chalmers*	3:00.36	Spain; Óscar Husillos; Lucas Búa; Samuel García; Bruno Hortelano; Darwin Echeverry*; Mark Ujakpor*	3:00.78
20 kilometres walk	Álvaro Martín; Spain (ESP)	1:20.42	Diego García Carrera; Spain (ESP)	1:20.48	Vasiliy Mizinov; Authorised Neutral Athletes (ANA)	1:20.50
50 kilometres walk	Maryan Zakalnytskyy; Ukraine (UKR)	3:46:35	Matej Tóth; Slovakia (SVK)	3:47:27	Dzmitry Dziubin; Belarus (BLR)	3:47:59 PB
WR world record | ER European record | CR championship record | NR national record | WL world leading | EL European leading | PB personal best | SB seasonal best

* Indicates the athlete only competed in the preliminary heats and received medals.

==== Field ====
Chronology: 2014 | 2016 | 2018 | 2020 | 2022

Event	Gold		Silver		Bronze	
High jump	Mateusz Przybylko; Germany (GER)	2.35	Maksim Nedasekau; Belarus (BLR)	2.33	Ilya Ivanyuk; Authorised Neutral Athletes (ANA)	2.31
Pole vault	Armand Duplantis; Sweden (SWE)	6.05 WJR W23R	Timur Morgunov; Authorised Neutral Athletes (ANA)	6.00	Renaud Lavillenie; France (FRA)	5.95
Long jump	Miltiadis Tentoglou; Greece (GRE)	8.25	Fabian Heinle; Germany (GER)	8.13	Serhiy Nykyforov; Ukraine (UKR)	8.13
Triple jump	Nelson Évora; Portugal (POR)	17.10	Alexis Copello; Azerbaijan (AZE)	16.93	Dimítrios Tsiámis; Greece (GRE)	16.78
Shot put	Michał Haratyk; Poland (POL)	21.72	Konrad Bukowiecki; Poland (POL)	21.66	David Storl; Germany (GER)	21.41
Discus throw	Andrius Gudžius; Lithuania (LTU)	68.46	Daniel Ståhl; Sweden (SWE)	68.23	Lukas Weisshaidinger; Austria (AUT)	65.14
Javelin throw	Thomas Röhler; Germany (GER)	89.47	Andreas Hofmann; Germany (GER)	87.60	Magnus Kirt; Estonia (EST)	85.96
Hammer throw	Wojciech Nowicki; Poland (POL)	80.12	Paweł Fajdek; Poland (POL)	78.69	Bence Halász; Hungary (HUN)	77.36
Decathlon	Arthur Abele; Germany (GER)	8431	Ilya Shkurenyov; Authorised Neutral Athletes (ANA)	8321 SB	Vital Zhuk; Belarus (BLR)	8290 PB
WR world record | ER European record | CR championship record | NR national record | WL world leading | EL European leading | PB personal best | SB seasonal best

=== Women ===
==== Track ====
Chronology: 2014 | 2016 | 2018 | 2020 | 2022

Event	Gold		Silver		Bronze	
100 metres	Dina Asher-Smith; Great Britain & N.I. (GBR)	10.85 WL, NR	Gina Lückenkemper; Germany (GER)	10.98 =EU23R	Dafne Schippers; Netherlands (NED)	10.99 SB
200 metres	Dina Asher-Smith; Great Britain & N.I. (GBR)	21.89 WL, NR	Dafne Schippers; Netherlands (NED)	22.14 SB	Jamile Samuel; Netherlands (NED)	22.37 PB
400 metres	Justyna Święty-Ersetic; Poland (POL)	50.41 EL	María Belibasáki; Greece (GRE)	50.45 NR	Lisanne de Witte; Netherlands (NED)	50.77 NR
800 metres	Nataliya Pryshchepa; Ukraine (UKR)	2:00.38	Rénelle Lamote; France (FRA)	2:00.62	Olha Lyakhova; Ukraine (UKR)	2:00.79
1500 metres	Laura Muir; Great Britain & N.I. (GBR)	4:02.32	Sofia Ennaoui; Poland (POL)	4:03.08	Laura Weightman; Great Britain & N.I. (GBR)	4:03.75
5000 metres	Sifan Hassan; Netherlands (NED)	14:46.12 CR	Eilish McColgan; Great Britain & N.I. (GBR)	14:53.05	Yasemin Can; Turkey (TUR)	14:57.63
10,000 metres	Lonah Chemtai Salpeter; Israel (ISR)	31:43.29	Susan Krumins; Netherlands (NED)	31:52.55	Alina Reh; Germany (GER)	32:28.48
Marathon	Volha Mazuronak; Belarus (BLR)	2:26:22	Clémence Calvin; France (FRA)	2:26:28	Eva Vrabcová-Nývltová; Czech Republic (CZE)	2:26:31
Marathon	Belarus	7:21:54	Italy	7:32:46	Spain	7:44:06
100 metres hurdles	Elvira Herman; Belarus (BLR)	12.67	Pamela Dutkiewicz; Germany (GER)	12.72	Cindy Roleder; Germany (GER)	12.77 SB
400 metres hurdles	Léa Sprunger; Switzerland (SUI)	54.33	Hanna Ryzhykova; Ukraine (UKR)	54.51	Meghan Beesley; Great Britain & N.I. (GBR)	55.31
3000 metres steeplechase	Gesa Felicitas Krause; Germany (GER)	9:19.80	Fabienne Schlumpf; Switzerland (SUI)	9:22.29	Karoline Bjerkeli Grøvdal; Norway (NOR)	9:24.46
4 × 100 metres relay	Great Britain & N.I. Asha Philip; Bianca Williams; Imani-Lara Lansiquot; Dina Asher-Smith; Daryll Neita*	41.88	Netherlands; Dafne Schippers; Marije van Hunenstijn; Jamile Samuel; Naomi Sedney	42.15	Germany; Lisa-Marie Kwayie; Gina Lückenkemper; Tatjana Pinto; Rebekka Haase	42.23
4 × 400 metres relay	Poland; Małgorzata Hołub-Kowalik; Iga Baumgart-Witan; Patrycja Wyciszkiewicz; Justyna Święty-Ersetic; Natalia Kaczmarek*; Martyna Dąbrowska*	3:26.59	France; Elea-Mariama Diarra; Déborah Sananes; Agnès Raharolahy; Floria Gueï; Estelle Perrossier*	3:27.17	Great Britain & N.I. Zoey Clark; Anyika Onuora; Amy Allcock; Eilidh Doyle; Finette Agyapong*; Mary Abichi*; Emily Diamond*	3:27.40
20 kilometres walk	María Pérez; Spain (ESP)	1:26.36 CR	Antonella Palmisano; Italy (ITA)	1:27.30	Brigita Virbalytė-Dimšienė; Lithuania (LTU)	1:27.59
50 kilometres walk	Inês Henriques; Portugal (POR)	4:09:21 CR	Júlia Takács; Spain (ESP)	4:15:22	Khrystyna Yudkina; Ukraine (UKR)	4:20:46 PB
WR world record | ER European record | CR championship record | NR national record | WL world leading | EL European leading | PB personal best | SB seasonal best

* Indicates the athlete only competed in the preliminary heats and received medals.

==== Field ====
Chronology: 2014 | 2016 | 2018 | 2020 | 2022

Event	Gold		Silver		Bronze	
High jump	Mariya Lasitskene; Authorised Neutral Athletes (ANA)	2.00	Mirela Demireva; Bulgaria (BUL)	2.00	Marie-Laurence Jungfleisch; Germany (GER)	1.96
Pole vault	Katerina Stefanidi; Greece (GRE)	4.85 CR	Nikoleta Kyriakopoulou; Greece (GRE)	4.80 SB	Holly Bradshaw; Great Britain & N.I. (GBR)	4.75
Long jump	Malaika Mihambo; Germany (GER)	6.75	Maryna Bekh; Ukraine (UKR)	6.73	Shara Proctor; Great Britain & N.I. (GBR)	6.70
Triple jump	Paraskevi Papachristou; Greece (GRE)	14.60	Kristin Gierisch; Germany (GER)	14.45	Ana Peleteiro; Spain (ESP)	14.44
Shot put	Paulina Guba; Poland (POL)	19.33	Christina Schwanitz; Germany (GER)	19.19	Aliona Dubitskaya; Belarus (BLR)	18.81
Discus throw	Sandra Perković; Croatia (CRO)	67.62	Nadine Müller; Germany (GER)	63.00	Shanice Craft; Germany (GER)	62.46
Javelin throw	Christin Hussong; Germany (GER)	67.90 CR	Nikola Ogrodníková; Czech Republic (CZE)	61.85	Liveta Jasiūnaitė; Lithuania (LTU)	61.59
Hammer throw	Anita Włodarczyk; Poland (POL)	78.94 CR	Alexandra Tavernier; France (FRA)	74.78 NR	Joanna Fiodorow; Poland (POL)	74.00
Heptathlon	Nafissatou Thiam; Belgium (BEL)	6816	Katarina Johnson-Thompson; Great Britain & N.I. (GBR)	6759	Carolin Schäfer; Germany (GER)	6602
WR world record | ER European record | CR championship record | NR national record | WL world leading | EL European leading | PB personal best | SB seasonal best

== Medal table ==
The medals won by the marathon team at that edition of the championships were not yet counted in the medal table.

* Host nation (Germany)

Rank	Nation	Gold	Silver	Bronze	Total
1	Great Britain & N.I.	7	5	6	18
2	Poland	7	4	1	12
3	Germany*	6	7	7	20
4	France	3	4	3	10
5	Belgium	3	2	1	6
5	Greece	3	2	1	6
7	Norway	3	1	1	5
8	Spain	2	3	3	8
9	Ukraine	2	2	3	7
10	Belarus	2	1	3	6
11	Portugal	2	0	0	2
12	Netherlands	1	3	4	8
–	Authorised Neutral Athletes^{[1]}	1	3	2	6
13	Turkey	1	2	2	5
14	Switzerland	1	2	1	4
15	Sweden	1	2	0	3
16	Lithuania	1	0	2	3
17	Croatia	1	0	0	1
17	Israel	1	0	0	1
19	Italy	0	1	3	4
20	Czech Republic	0	1	1	2
21	Azerbaijan	0	1	0	1
21	Bulgaria	0	1	0	1
21	Slovakia	0	1	0	1
24	Austria	0	0	1	1
24	Estonia	0	0	1	1
24	Hungary	0	0	1	1
24	Ireland	0	0	1	1
Totals (27 entries)		48	48	48	144

Notes

^[1] The European Athletic Association (commonly known as "European Athletics") does not include the medals won by Authorised Neutral Athletes in the medal table.

* Updated after the disqualifications of Alina Tsviliy and Meraf Bahta.

== Entry standards ==
Entry standards and conditions were published on 8 December 2017.

Event	Men	Women
100 metres	10.35	11.50
200 metres	20.90	23.50
400 metres	46.70	53.40
800 metres	1:47.60	2:02.50
1500 metres	3:40.00	4:12.00
5000 metres	13:42.00	15:40.00
10,000 metres	28:55.00	33:20.00
3000 metres steeplechase	8:40.00	9:55.00
110/100 metre hurdles	13.85	13.25
400 metres hurdles	50.70	57.70
20 kilometres race walk	1:25:00	1:37:00
50 kilometres race walk	4:08:00	4:50:00 (or 1:39.00 in 20km RW)
Marathon	—	—
High jump	2.26 m	1.90 m
Pole vault	5.55 m	4.45 m
Long jump	7.95 m	6.60 m
Triple jump	16.60 m	13.90 m
Shot put	19.90 m	16.50 m
Discus throw	63.50 m	56.00 m
Hammer throw	74.00 m	69.00 m
Javelin throw	80.00 m	59.00 m
Decathlon/Heptathlon	7850	5900

== Participating nations ==
Athletes from a total of 49 member federations of the European Athletics Association competed at these Championships. On top of this a total of 29 athletes competed as Authorised Neutral Athletes. One athlete (Puok Thiep Gatkuoth in men's marathon) was announced to compete as part of Athlete Refugee Team, but in the end he did not start.

- Albania (3)
- Andorra (1)
- Armenia (2)
- Austria (16)
- Authorised Neutral Athletes (29)
- Azerbaijan (3)
- Belarus (37)
- Belgium (35)
- Bosnia and Herzegovina (6)
- Bulgaria (13)
- Croatia (21)
- Cyprus (11)
- Czech Republic (48)
- Denmark (10)
- Estonia (22)
- Finland (42)
- France (80)
- Georgia (3)
- Germany (115)
- Gibraltar (3)
- Great Britain & N.I. (95)
- Greece (36)
- Hungary (33)
- Iceland (4)
- Ireland (33)
- Israel (8)
- Italy (77)
- Kosovo (2)
- Latvia (17)
- Lithuania (27)
- Luxembourg (3)
- Macedonia (2)
- Malta (2)
- Moldova (6)
- Monaco (1)
- Montenegro (4)
- Netherlands (42)
- Norway (31)
- Poland (81)
- Portugal (35)
- Romania (33)
- San Marino (2)
- Serbia (12)
- Slovakia (19)
- Slovenia (10)
- Spain (91)
- Sweden (65)
- Switzerland (47)
- Turkey (38)
- Ukraine (83)

== See also ==
2018 World Para Athletics European Championships, the European championship event for disabled athletes, also held in Berlin in 2018.
