= Azerbaijan at the 2016 European Athletics Championships =

- WA code: AZE
- National federation: AAF

in Amsterdam
- Competitors: 5 (3 men and 2 women) in 5 events
- Medals Ranked 27th: Gold 0 Silver 0 Bronze 1 Total 1

European Athletics Championships appearances
- 2002; 2006; 2010; 2012; 2014; 2016; 2018; 2022; 2024

Other related appearances
- Soviet Union (1946–1990)

Azerbaijan competed at the 2016 European Athletics Championships in Amsterdam, Netherlands, between 6 and 10 July 2016.

== Medals ==
Medal	Name	Event	Date
Bronze	Hanna Skydan	Women's hammer throw	8 July

== Results ==
Men

Track & road events

Athlete	Event	Heat		Semifinal		Final	
Athlete	Event	Result	Rank	Result	Rank	Result	Rank
Hayle Ibrahimov	5000 m	—				13:42.20	6
Evans Kiplagat	Half marathon	—				1:05:01	19

Field Events

Athlete	Event	Qualification		Final	
Athlete	Event	Distance	Rank	Distance	Rank
Nazim Babayev	Triple jump	16.06w	23	did not advance	

Women

Track & road events

Athlete	Event	Heat		Semifinal		Final	
Athlete	Event	Result	Rank	Result	Rank	Result	Rank
Anastasiya Komarova	800 m	2:04.60 SB	19 q	2:03.32 SB	20	did not advance	

Field Events

Athlete	Event	Qualification		Final	
Athlete	Event	Distance	Rank	Distance	Rank
Hanna Skydan	Hammer throw	70.41	3 Q	73.83	3rd place, bronze medalist(s)
