= Azerbaijan at the 2018 European Athletics Championships =

- WA code: AZE
- National federation: AAF

in Berlin
- Competitors: 3
- Medals Ranked =21st: Gold 0 Silver 1 Bronze 0 Total 1

European Athletics Championships appearances
- 2002; 2006; 2010; 2012; 2014; 2016; 2018; 2022; 2024

Other related appearances
- Soviet Union (1946–1990)

Azerbaijan competed at the 2018 European Athletics Championships in Berlin, Germany, from 6–12 August 2018. A delegation of 3 athletes were sent to represent the country.

The following athletes were selected to compete by the Azerbaijan Athletics Federation.

Men
Field events

Athletes	Event	Qualification		Final	
Athletes	Event	Distance	Position	Distance	Position
Nazim Babayev	Triple jump	16.54	9 (q)	16.76	4
Alexis Copello	Triple jump	16.82	1 (Q)	16.93	2nd place, silver medalist(s)

Women
Field events

Athletes	Event	Qualification		Final	
Athletes	Event	Distance	Position	Distance	Position
Hanna Skydan	Hammer throw	74.02	2 (Q)	72.10	5
