= France at the 2018 European Athletics Championships =

- WA code: FRA
- National federation: FFA

in Berlin
- Competitors: 84
- Medals: Gold 3 Silver 4 Bronze 3 Total 10

European Athletics Championships appearances (overview)
- 1934; 1938; 1946; 1950; 1954; 1958; 1962; 1966; 1969; 1971; 1974; 1978; 1982; 1986; 1990; 1994; 1998; 2002; 2006; 2010; 2012; 2014; 2016; 2018; 2022; 2024

France competed at the 2018 European Athletics Championships in Berlin, Germany, from 6–12 August 2018. A delegation of 84 athletes were sent to represent the country.

== Results ==
=== Men ===
Track and road events

Athletes	Event	Heats		Semifinal		Final	
Athletes	Event	Result	Rank	Result	Rank	Result	Rank
Mouhamadou Fall	100 metres	—N/a					
Amaury Golitin	100 metres	—N/a					
Marvin René	100 metres	—N/a					
Jimmy Vicaut	100 metres	—N/a		9.97	1 Q		
Stuart Dutamby	200 metres						
Mickaël-Méba Zeze	200 metres						
Pierre-Ambroise Bosse	800 metres						
Gabriel Tual	800 metres						
Simon Denissel	1500 metres			—N/a			
Alexis Miellet	1500 metres			—N/a			
Baptiste Mischler	1500 metres			—N/a			
Morhad Amdouni	5000 metres	—N/a					
Florian Carvalho	5000 metres	—N/a					
Mahiedine Mekhissi-Benabbad	5000 metres	—N/a					
Morhad Amdouni	10,000 metres	—N/a				28:11.22	1st place, gold medalist(s)
François Barrer	10,000 metres	—N/a					
Florian Carvalho	10,000 metres	—N/a					
Hassan Chahdi	Marathon	—N/a					
Yohan Durand	Marathon	—N/a					
Jean-Domascene Habarurema	Marathon	—N/a					
Benjamin Malaty	Marathon	—N/a					
Abdellatif Meftah	Marathon	—N/a					
Garfield Darien	110 metres hurdles						
Aurel Manga	110 metres hurdles						
Pascal Martinot-Lagarde	110 metres hurdles						
Ludovic Payen	110 metres hurdles						
Victor Coroller	400 metres hurdles						
Muhammad Abdulla Kounta	400 metres hurdles						
Ludvy Vaillant	400 metres hurdles						
Djilali Bedrani	3000 metres steeplechase			—N/a			
Yoann Kowal	3000 metres steeplechase			—N/a			
Mahiedine Mekhissi-Benabbad	3000 metres steeplechase			—N/a			
Stuart Dutamby; Mouhamadou Fall; Amaury Golitin; Marvin René; Jimmy Vicaut; Mickaël-Méba Zeze	4 × 100 metres relay			—N/a			
Mame-Ibra Anne; Teddy Atine-Venel; Mamoudou Hanne; Thomas Jordier; Muhammad Abdulla Kounta; Ludvy Vaillant	4 × 400 metres relay			—N/a			
Gabriel Bordier	20 km walk	—N/a					
Kevin Campion	20 km walk	—N/a					

Field events

Athletes	Event	Qualification		Final	
Athletes	Event	Distance	Position	Distance	Position
Axel Chapelle	Pole vault				
Renaud Lavillenie	Pole vault				
Alioune Sene	Pole vault				
Kafétien Gomis	Long jump				
Yann Randrianasolo	Long jump				
Guillaume Victorin	Long jump				
Harold Correa	Triple jump				
Kevin Luron	Triple jump				
Jean-Marc Pontvianne	Triple jump				
Frederic Dagee	Shot put				
Lolassonn Djouhan	Discus throw				
Quentin Bigot	Hammer throw				

Combined events – Decathlon

Athlete	Event	100 m	LJ	SP	HJ	400 m	110H	DT	PV	JT	1500 m	Final	Rank
Ruben Gado	Result	10.86 SB	NM	13.40	1.96	47.65 PB	15.18	35.74	5.20 =SB	56.17	4:21.49	7137	17
Ruben Gado	Points	892	0	692	767	926	828	579	972	680	801	7137	17
Romain Martin	Result	11.16	NM	13.76	2.02	49.60 =SB	14.72	39.57 =SB	5.10 =PB	60.49 SB	4:52.79	7022	18
Romain Martin	Points	825	0	714	822	833	884	656	941	745	602	7022	18
Kevin Mayer	Result	10.64 PB	NM	DNS	DNS	-	-	-	-	-	-	DNF	-
Kevin Mayer	Points	942	0	0	0	-	-	-	-	-	-	DNF	-

=== Women ===
Track and road events

Athletes	Event	Heats		Semifinal		Final	
Athletes	Event	Result	Rank	Result	Rank	Result	Rank
Orphee Neola	100 metres						
Orlann Ombissa	100 metres						
Carole Zahi	100 metres						
Floria Gueï	400 metres						
Cynthia Anais	800 metres						
Rénelle Lamote	800 metres						
Claudia Saunders	800 metres						
Sophie Duarte	10,000 metres	—N/a					
Clémence Calvin	Marathon	—N/a					
Solene Ndama	100 metres hurdles						
Laura Valette	100 metres hurdles						
Aurélie Chaboudez	400 metres hurdles						
Ophélie Claude-Boxberger	3000 metres steeplechase			—N/a			
Emma Oudiou	3000 metres steeplechase			—N/a			
Stella Akakpo; Amandine Brossier; Jennifer Galais; Orlann Ombissa; Estelle Raffai; Carole Zahi	4 × 100 metres relay			—N/a			
Cynthia Anais; Elea-Mariama Diarra; Floria Gueï; Kellya Pauline; Estelle Perrossier; Agnès Raharolahy; Déborah Sananes	4 × 400 metres relay			—N/a			
Émilie Menuet	20 km walk	—N/a					
Lucie Champalou	50 km walk	—N/a					

Field events

Athletes	Event	Qualification		Final	
Athletes	Event	Distance	Position	Distance	Position
Ninon Guillon-Romarin	Pole vault				
Marion Lotout	Pole vault				
Éloyse Lesueur-Aymonin	Long jump				
Jeanine Assani Issouf	Triple jump				
Rouguy Diallo	Triple jump				
Alexandra Tavernier	Hammer throw				
Alexie Alaïs	Javelin throw				

Combined events – Heptathlon

Athlete	Event	100H	HJ	SP	200 m	LJ	JT	800 m	Final	Rank
Diane Marie-Hardy	Result									
Diane Marie-Hardy	Points									
Esther Turpin	Result									
Esther Turpin	Points									
