= Azerbaijan at the 2024 European Athletics Championships =

- Flag of Azerbaijan
- WA code: AZE

in Rome, Italy 7 June 2024 – 12 June 2022
- Competitors: 4 (2 men and 2 women)
- Medals: Gold 0 Silver 0 Bronze 0 Total 0

European Athletics Championships appearances
- 2002; 2006; 2010; 2012; 2014; 2016; 2018; 2022; 2024

Other related appearances
- Soviet Union (1946–1990)

Azerbaijan competed at the 2024 European Athletics Championships in Rome, Italy from 7–12 June 2024.

== Medallists ==
| Medal | Name | Event | Date |

== Results ==
Azerbaijan entered the following athletes.

Key

- Q = Qualified for the next round
- q = Qualified for the next round as a fastest loser or, in field events, by position without achieving the qualifying target
- NR = National record
- PB = Personal best
- SB = Season best
- N/A = Round not applicable for the event

=== Men ===
Field events

| Athlete | Event | Qualification | | Final | |
| Athlete | Event | Distance | Position | Distance | Position |
|---|---|---|---|---|---|
| Nazim Babayev | Long jump | 6.92 | 29 | Did not advance | |
| Alexis Copello | Triple jump | 16.44 SB | 13 | Did not advance | |

=== Women ===
Field events

| Athlete | Event | Qualification | | Final | |
| Athlete | Event | Distance | Position | Distance | Position |
|---|---|---|---|---|---|
| Yekaterina Sariyeva | Triple jump | 12.93 | 25 | Did not advance | |
| Hanna Skydan | Hammer throw | 68.80 | 11 q | 68.10 | 10 |
