= Portugal at the 2018 European Athletics Championships =

- WA code: POR
- National federation: FPA
- Website: www.fpatletismo.pt

in Berlin
- Competitors: 36
- Medals: Gold 2 Silver 0 Bronze 0 Total 2

European Athletics Championships appearances
- 1934; 1938; 1946; 1950; 1954; 1958; 1962; 1966; 1969; 1971; 1974; 1978; 1982; 1986; 1990; 1994; 1998; 2002; 2006; 2010; 2012; 2014; 2016; 2018; 2022; 2024; 2026

Portugal competed at the 2018 European Athletics Championships in Berlin, Germany, from 6–12 August 2018. A delegation of 36 athletes were sent to represent the country.

The following athletes were selected to compete by the Portuguese Athletics Federation.

Men
Track and road

Athletes	Event	Heats		Semifinal		Final	
Athletes	Event	Result	Rank	Result	Rank	Result	Rank
José Lopes	100 metres	10.38	12 q	10.40	21	did not advance	
Carlos Nascimento	100 metres	10.33	6 Q	10.31	14	did not advance	
Yazaldes Nascimento	100 metres	10.33	5 Q	10.22 SB	9	did not advance	
Ricardo dos Santos	400 metres	45.55 NR	4 Q	45.14 NR	7 q	45.78	7
Samuel Barata	10,000 metres	—N/a				did not finish	
Diogo Mestre	400 metres hurdles	52.65	23	did not advance			
André Pereira	3000 metres steeplechase	8:54.63	27	—N/a		did not advance	
Diogo Antunes; Frederico Curvelo; Ricardo dos Santos; José Lopes; Carlos Nascimento; Yazaldes Nascimento	4 × 100 metres relay	39.09 SB	7 q	—N/a		39.07 SB	7
Pedro Isidro	50 km walk	—N/a				4:11:44	24
João Vieira	50 km walk	—N/a				did not finish	

Field events

Athletes	Event	Qualification		Final	
Athletes	Event	Distance	Position	Distance	Position
Diogo Ferreira	Pole vault	5.36	25	did not advance	
Nelson Évora	Triple jump	16.62	6 q	17.10 SB	1st place, gold medalist(s)
Tsanko Arnaudov	Shot put	19.89	9 q	20.33	9
Francisco Belo	Shot put	19.66	14	did not advance	

Women
Track and road

Athletes	Event	Heats		Semifinal		Final	
Athletes	Event	Result	Rank	Result	Rank	Result	Rank
Lorène Dorcas Bazolo	100 metres	11.51	11 q	11.46	19	did not advance	
Lorène Dorcas Bazolo	200 metres	23.60	10 q	23.80	22	did not advance	
Cátia Azevedo	400 metres	51.84 SB	4 Q	52.23	18	did not advance	
Marta Pen	1500 metres	4:09.40	9 Q	—N/a		4:06.54	6
Inês Monteiro	10,000 metres	—N/a				did not finish	
Sara Moreira	10,000 metres	—N/a				did not finish	
Sara Catarina Ribeiro	10,000 metres	—N/a				32:53.71	10
Cátia Azevedo; Dorothé Évora; Filipa Martins; Rivinilda Mentai; Joceline Monteiro	4 × 400 metres relay	3:33.35 SB	12	—N/a		did not advance	
Edna Barros	20 km walk	—N/a				did not finish	
Ana Cabecinha	20 km walk	—N/a				1:29:49	8
Inês Henriques	50 km walk	—N/a				4:09:21 CR	1st place, gold medalist(s)

Field events

Athletes	Event	Qualification		Final	
Athletes	Event	Distance	Position	Distance	Position
Evelise Veiga	Long jump	6.61 =NU23R	12 q	6.47	8
Susana Costa	Triple jump	14.17 SB	10 Q	13.97	11
Patrícia Mamona	Triple jump	13.92	16	did not advance	
Lecabela Quaresma	Triple jump	13.87	19	did not advance	
Eliana Bandeira	Shot put	15.18	22	did not advance	
Liliana Cá	Discus throw	58.37	8 q	58.91	7
Irina Rodrigues	Discus throw	59.22	4 Q	58.00	9

Combined events – Heptathlon

Athlete	Event	100H	HJ	SP	200 m	LJ	JT	800 m	Final	Rank
Lecabela Quaresma	Result	14.19	1.79 SB	13.64	25.61	6.10	39.27	2:14.70	5950 SB	16
Lecabela Quaresma	Points	952	966	770	832	880	653	897	5950 SB	16
