= 2018 European Athletics Championships – Women's 400 metres =

Women's 400 metres at the 2018 European Athletics Championships
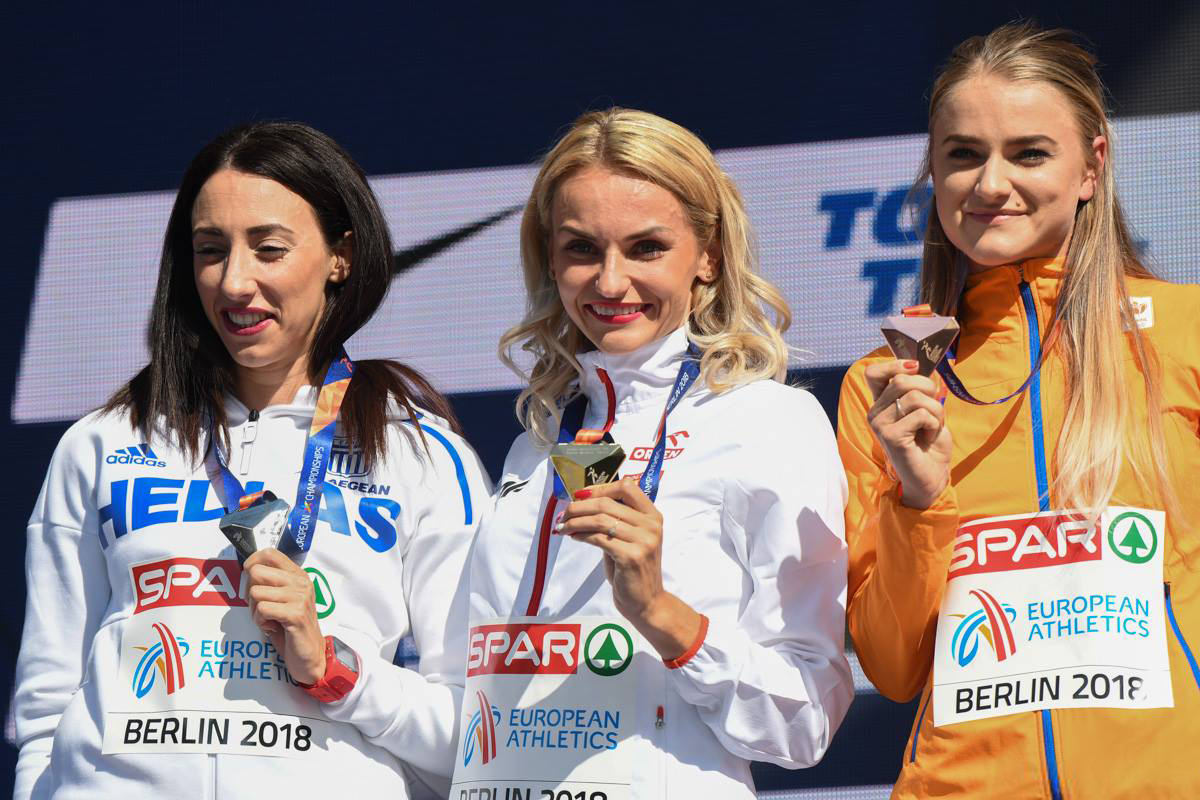
- Maria Belimpasaki, Justyna Święty-Ersetic, and Lisanne de Witte at the medal ceremony
- Venue: Olympic Stadium
- Location: Berlin, Germany
- Dates: 8 August 2018 (round 1); 9 August 2018 (semi-finals); 11 August 2018 (final)
- Competitors: 42 from 21 nations
- Winning time: 50.41 s

Medalists
gold medal	Justyna Święty-Ersetic	Poland
silver medal	Maria Belimpasaki	Greece
bronze medal	Lisanne de Witte	Netherlands

The women's 400 metres at the 2018 European Athletics Championships was held over three rounds at the Olympic Stadium in Berlin, Germany, on 8, 9, and 11 August 2018. It was the nineteenth time this event was contested at the European Athletics Championships. Athletes could qualify by achieving the entry standard of 53.40 seconds or by their ranking in selected athletics meetings. Forty-two athletes from twenty-one nations competed in the event.

Thirty-two athletes competed in round 1, where fourteen athletes advanced to the semi-finals. Ten athletes with a bye in the first round joined them there. Eight athletes qualified for the final, which was won by Justyna Święty-Ersetic of Poland in 50.41 seconds, followed by Maria Belimpasaki of Greece in second place in a national record of 50.45 seconds and Lisanne de Witte in third place in a national record of 50.77 seconds.

== Background ==
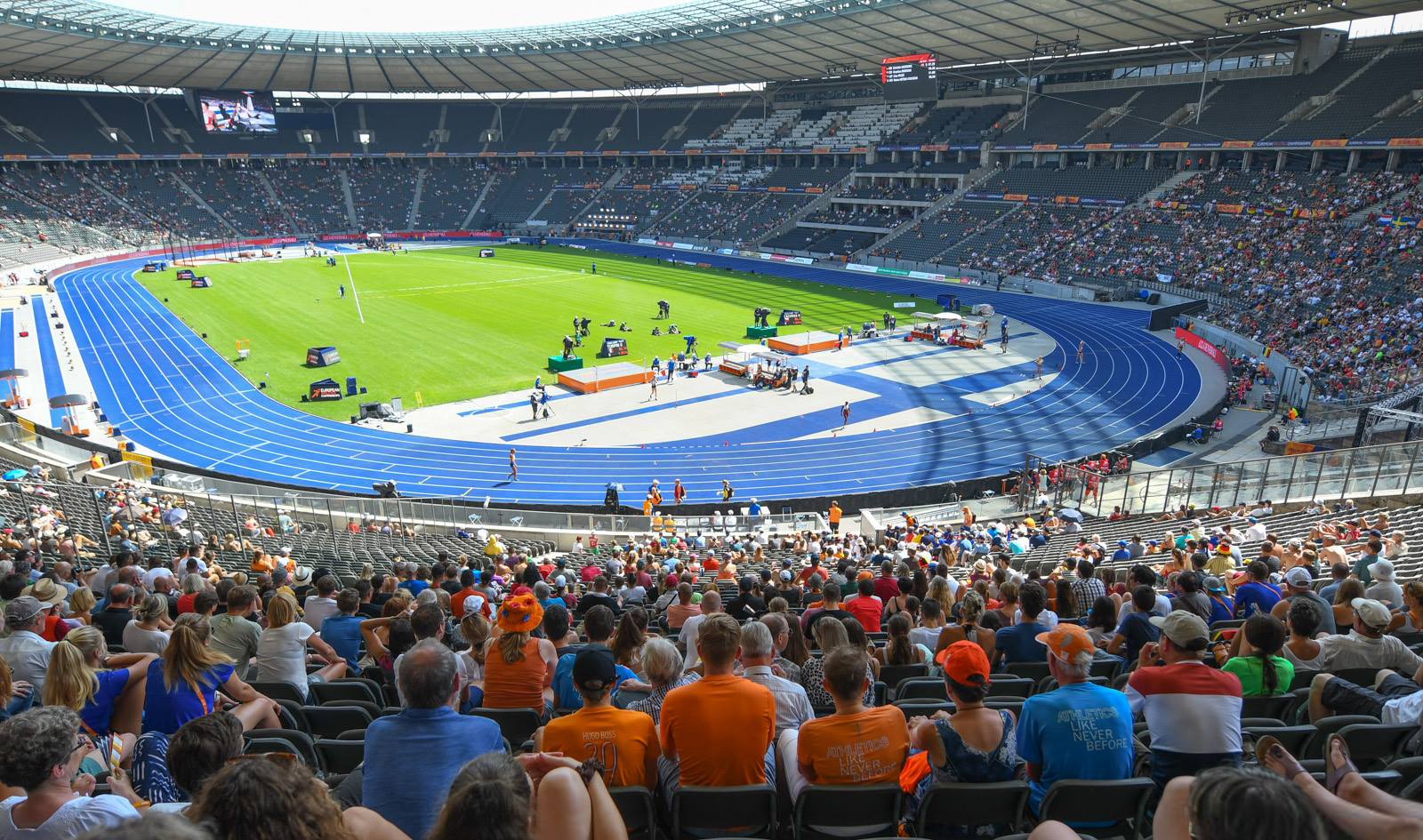
Olympic Stadium on 9 August 2018

At the European Athletics Championships, the women's 400 metres had been contested eighteen times before 2018, at every edition since its introduction in 1958. In the event, athletes run one lap on a 400-metre athletics track in designated lanes.

At the start of the 2018 championships, Marita Koch of East Germany held the European and world record of 47.60 s set in 1985 and the championship record of 48.16 s set in 1982. Shaunae Miller-Uibo of the Bahamas had run the world leading time of 48.97 s on 20 July 2018 and Léa Sprunger of Switzerland had run the European leading time of 50.52 s on 1 July 2018. Libania Grenot of Italy was the defending champion, having won the 2016 title in 50.73 s.

The event was held at the Olympic Stadium in Berlin, Germany. It was built for the 1936 Summer Olympics and renovated in 2000–2004. During the 2018 European Athletics Championships, it had a capacity of 55,000 spectators.

Records before the 2018 European Athletics Championships
Record	Athlete (nation)	Time	Location	Date
World record	Marita Koch (GDR)	47.60	Canberra, Australia	6 October 1985
European record	Marita Koch (GDR)	47.60	Canberra, Australia	6 October 1985
Championship record	Marita Koch (GDR)	48.16	Athens, Greece	8 September 1982
World leading	Shaunae Miller-Uibo (BAH)	48.97	Monaco	20 July 2018
European leading	Léa Sprunger (SUI)	50.52	La Chaux-de-Fonds, Switzerland	1 July 2018

== Qualification ==
For this event, the qualification period was from 1 January 2017 until 30 July 2018. Athletes could qualify by running the entry standard of 53.40 s or faster, by finishing in the top three of a European Athletics Premium meeting, by winning a European Athletics Classic meeting, or by wildcard for the previous European champion. When a nation had no qualified athletes in the event, it could enter one unqualified athlete to be accepted at the discretion of European Athletics. Up to three athletes from one nation could participate, or four in case one had received a wildcard.

== Results ==
=== Round 1 ===
Thirty-two athletes from twenty nations competed in the four heats of round 1 on 8 August, which started at 11:30 (UTC+2) in the morning. The first two athletes in each heat (Q) and the next six fastest athletes of the rest (q) advanced to the semi-finals. Six athletes set a personal best (PB) during this round.

Results of round 1
Rank	Heat	Lane	Athlete	Nation	Time	Note
1	1	6	Laviai Nielsen	Great Britain & N.I.	51.67	Q, PB
2	2	5	Cynthia Bolingo	Belgium	51.69	Q, PB
3	3	6	Maria Benedicta Chigbolu	Italy	51.76	Q, SB
4	1	5	Cátia Azevedo	Portugal	51.84	Q, SB
5	2	7	Floria Gueï	France	51.89	Q
6	1	2	Gunta Latiševa-Čudare	Latvia	51.98	q
7	4	7	Polina Miller	Authorised Neutral Athletes	52.01	Q
8	4	1	Laura Bueno	Spain	52.14	Q, PB
9	2	3	Bianca Răzor	Romania	52.19	q, SB
10	4	8	Iga Baumgart-Witan	Poland	52.23	q
11	2	1	Tamara Salaški	Serbia	52.39	q
12	3	4	Camille Laus	Belgium	52.40	Q
13	3	2	Andrea Miklós	Romania	52.40	q
14	3	3	Tetyana Melnyk	Ukraine	52.44	q
15	2	6	Nadine Gonska	Germany	52.54	
16	4	5	Laura de Witte	Netherlands	52.57	
17	4	4	Matilda Hellqvist	Sweden	52.68	PB
18	4	6	Modesta Morauskaitė	Lithuania	52.68	
19	1	1	Alyona Mamina	Authorised Neutral Athletes	52.72	
20	1	8	Alexandra Bezeková	Slovakia	52.88	
21	3	5	Despina Mourta	Greece	52.96	PB
22	4	3	Alina Lohvynenko	Ukraine	53.18	
23	3	7	Iveta Putalová	Slovakia	53.21	
24	2	8	Lada Vondrová	Czech Republic	53.21	PB
25	3	1	Lena Symerská	Czech Republic	53.25	
26	2	4	Irini Vasiliou	Greece	53.37	
27	2	2	Kseniya Aksyonova	Authorised Neutral Athletes	53.37	
28	1	4	Zdeňka Seidlová	Czech Republic	53.38	
29	1	7	Anastasiia Bryzgina	Ukraine	53.62	
30	1	3	Maja Ćirić	Serbia	53.65	
31	3	8	Eva Misiūnaitė	Lithuania	54.02	
32	4	2	Evelin Nádházy	Hungary	54.34	

=== Semi-finals ===
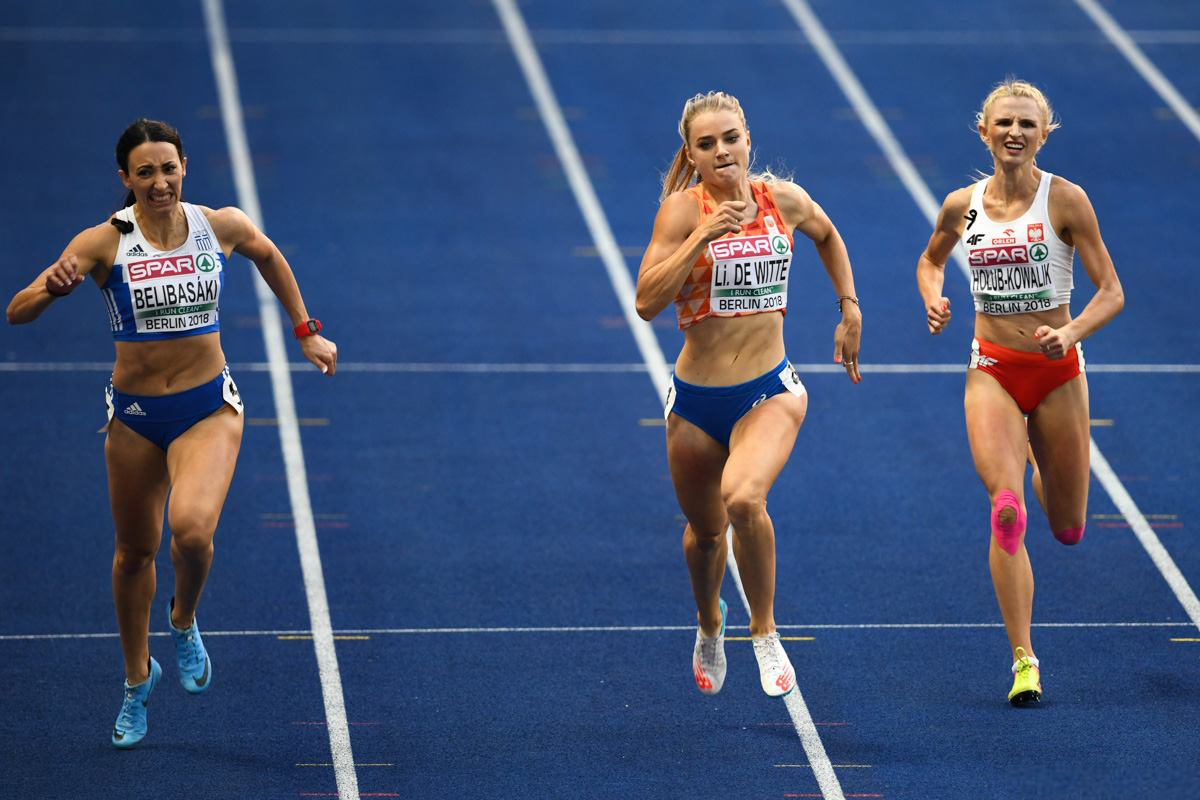
Maria Belimpasaki, Lisanne de Witte, and Małgorzata Hołub-Kowalik during the first heat of the semi-finals

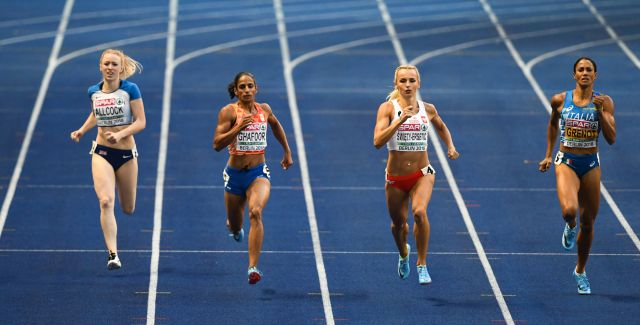
Amy Allcock, Madiea Ghafoor, Justyna Święty-Ersetic, and Libania Grenot in the third heat of the semi-finals

Twenty-four athletes – ten who had a bye in round 1 and qualified directly based on their season's bests and fourteen who qualified in the first round – from sixteen nations competed in the three heats of the semi-finals on 9 August, that started at 19:50 (UTC+2) in the evening. The first two athletes in each heat (Q) and the next two fastest athletes of the rest (q) qualified for the final. Laviai Nielsen of Great Britain and Northern Ireland and Iga Baumgart-Witan of Poland set personal bests (PB) during this round.

Results of the semi-finals
Rank	Heat	Lane	Athlete	Nation	Time	Note
1	1	8	Laviai Nielsen	Great Britain & N.I.	51.21	Q, PB
2	1	5	Maria Belimpasaki*	Greece	51.23	Q
3	3	4	Justyna Święty-Ersetic*	Poland	51.23	Q
4	1	4	Lisanne de Witte*	Netherlands	51.24	q
5	3	5	Madiea Ghafoor*	Netherlands	51.29	Q
6	2	7	Iga Baumgart-Witan	Poland	51.35	Q, PB
7	2	4	Agnė Šerkšnienė*	Lithuania	51.41	Q
8	1	6	Floria Gueï	France	51.50	q, SB
9	3	3	Libania Grenot*	Italy	51.54	
10	3	7	Gunta Latiševa-Čudare	Latvia	51.60	SB
11	3	8	Polina Miller	Authorised Neutral Athletes	51.65	EU20L
12	1	3	Małgorzata Hołub-Kowalik*	Poland	51.74	
13	2	5	Anyika Onuora*	Great Britain & N.I.	51.77	
14	2	3	Anita Horvat*	Slovenia	51.89	
15	3	6	Amy Allcock*	Great Britain & N.I.	51.91	
16	1	7	Cynthia Bolingo	Belgium	51.92	
17	1	1	Tetyana Melnyk	Ukraine	52.20	SB
18	1	2	Cátia Azevedo	Portugal	52.23	
19	2	8	Maria Benedicta Chigbolu	Italy	52.26	
20	3	1	Bianca Răzor	Romania	52.27	
21	2	6	Camille Laus	Belgium	52.40	
22	3	2	Laura Bueno	Spain	52.46	
23	2	2	Andrea Miklós	Romania	52.49	
24	2	1	Tamara Salaški	Serbia	53.20	

*Athletes who received a bye to the semifinals

=== Final ===
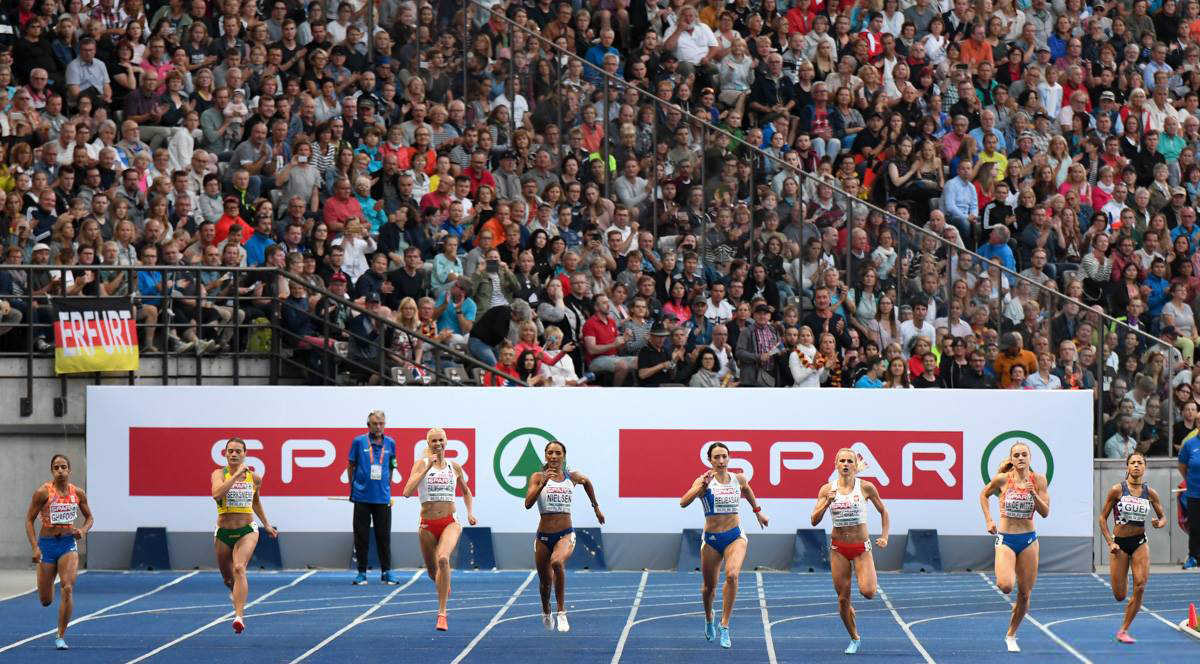
The eight finalists around 300 metres into the race

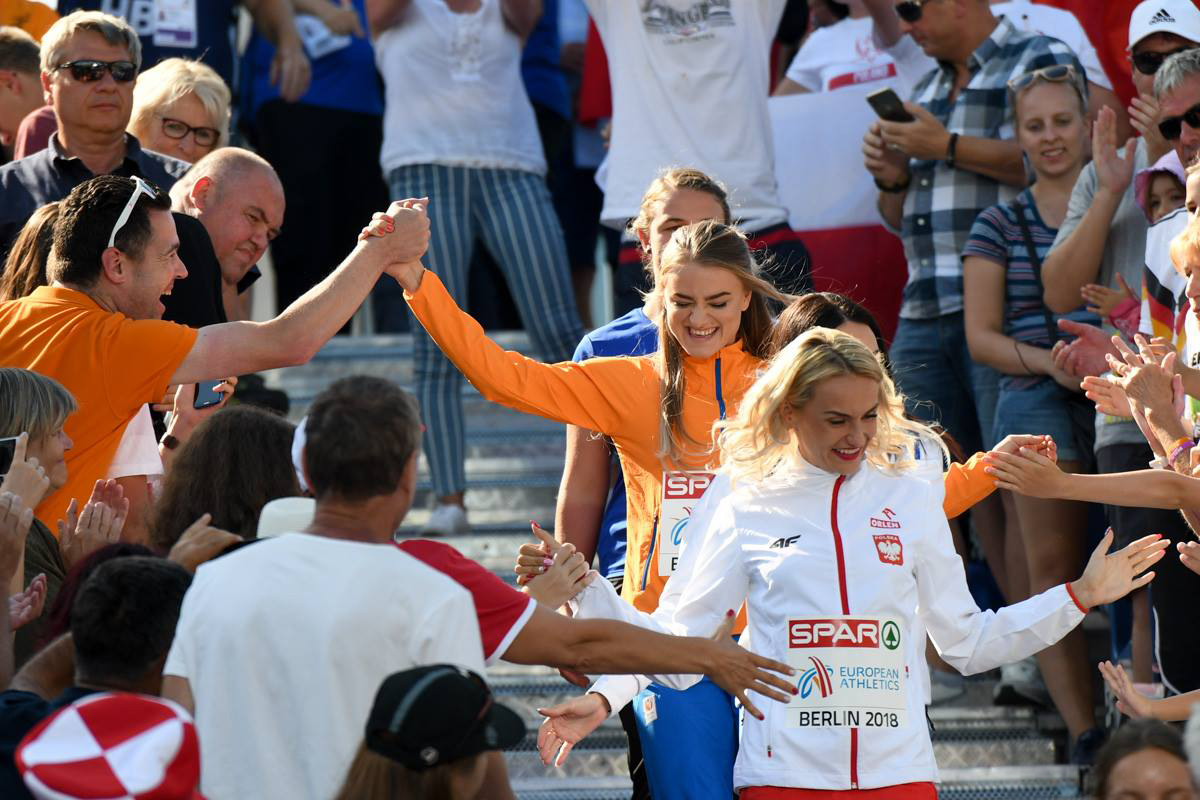
Lisanne de Witte, Maria Belimpasaki (mostly hidden), and Justyna Święty-Ersetic before the medal ceremony

Eight athletes from six nations competed in the final on 11 August at 20:12 (UTC+2) in the evening. Around 300 metres into the race, coming out of the second bend, Maria Belimpasaki of Greece was in the lead, followed by Justyna Święty-Ersetic of Poland and Laviai Nielsen of Great Britain and Northern Ireland in second and third position, respectively, and Lisanne de Witte of the Netherlands in fourth position. At the finish, Święty-Ersetic moved into the winning position passing Belimpasaki, who tumbled over the line and finished second. Nielsen had fallen back to fourth place, while De Witte had moved up to third. Święty-Ersetic won the gold medal in a European leading time (EL) of 50.41 s, Belimpasaki won silver in a Greek national record (NR) of 50.45 s, and De Witte won bronze in a Dutch national record (NR) of 50.77 s. Outside the medals, Iga Baumgart-Witan of Poland ran a personal best.

Cathal Dennehy, reporting for the IAAF, wrote that Święty-Ersetic "produced a stunning performance to snatch gold in the dying strides of the women's 400m". Tadeusz Kądziela of the Polish Gazeta Wyborcza called Święty-Ersetic's performance a "phenomenal run".

The medalists were interviewed about the race. Święty-Ersetic said: "This time is amazing. It is the second-fastest time in the Polish history and also the first European gold for our country at this distance so it means a lot. Even Irena Szewińska who passed away this year got only bronze so it is very emotional and important for me." Belimpasaki said: "I tried very hard, I felt good and I went on to win with a good mentality. I lost my stride in the last meters and fell." De Witte said: "I went for a medal. Beforehand I said to my sister: you go and run. I was so nervous. I'm really happy with bronze."

Results of the final
Rank	Lane	Athlete	Nation	Time	Note
1st place, gold medalist(s)	3	Justyna Święty-Ersetic	Poland	50.41	EL
2nd place, silver medalist(s)	4	Maria Belimpasaki	Greece	50.45	NR
3rd place, bronze medalist(s)	2	Lisanne de Witte	Netherlands	50.77	NR
4	5	Laviai Nielsen	Great Britain & N.I.	51.21	
5	6	Iga Baumgart-Witan	Poland	51.24	PB
6	7	Agnė Šerkšnienė	Lithuania	51.42	
7	1	Floria Gueï	France	51.57	
8	8	Madiea Ghafoor	Netherlands	51.57	
