= Germany at the 2018 European Athletics Championships =

- WA code: GER
- National federation: Deutscher Leichtathletik-Verband
- Website: www.leichtathletik.de

in Berlin
- Competitors: 127
- Medals: Gold 6 Silver 7 Bronze 7 Total 20

European Athletics Championships appearances (overview)
- 1934; 1938; 1946–1950; 1954; 1958; 1962; 1966–1990; 1994; 1998; 2002; 2006; 2010; 2012; 2014; 2016; 2018; 2022; 2024

Germany competed as host nation at the 2018 European Athletics Championships in Berlin, Germany, from 6-12 August 2018. A delegation of 128 athletes were sent to represent the country.

The following athletes were selected to compete by the German Athletics Federation.

Men
Track and road

| Athletes | Event | Heats | | Semifinal | | Final | |
| Athletes | Event | Result | Rank | Result | Rank | Result | Rank |
|---|---|---|---|---|---|---|---|
| Lucas Jakubczyk | 100 metres | 10.41 | 15 Q | 10.32 | 16 | did not advance | |
| Kevin Kranz | 100 metres | 10.41 | 17 | did not advance | | | |
| Julian Reus | 100 metres | 10.37 | 11 Q | 10.37 | 18 | did not advance | |
| Robin Erewa | 200 metres | 20.69 | 9 q | 20.79 | 18 | did not advance | |
| Aleixo-Platini Menga | 200 metres | Bye | | 20.83 | 20 | did not advance | |
| Steven Müller | 200 metres | 20.78 | 12 Q | 20.76 | 15 | did not advance | |
| Patrick Schneider | 400 metres | 46.15 | 13 Q | 46.58 | 24 | did not advance | |
| Johannes Trefz | 400 metres | 46.53 | 19 | did not advance | | | |
| Benedikt Huber | 800 metres | 1:48.33 | 22 | Did not advance | | | |
| Christoph Kessler | 800 metres | 1:48.13 | 19 | Did not advance | | | |
| Marc Reuther | 800 metres | Disqualified | | Did not advance | | | |
| Timo Benitz | 1500 metres | 3:41.01 | 8 q | —N/a | | 3:39.28 | 7 |
| Marius Probst | 1500 metres | 3:42.37 | 17 | —N/a | | did not advance | |
| Homiyu Tesfaye | 1500 metres | 3:49.28 | 11 Q | —N/a | | 3:47.83 | 13 |
| Marcel Fehr | 5000 metres | —N/a | | | | 13:37.66 | 19 |
| Florian Orth | 5000 metres | —N/a | | | | 13:37.46 | 18 |
| Sebastian Hendel | 10,000 metres | —N/a | | | | 29:53.45 | 24 |
| Amanal Petros | 10,000 metres | —N/a | | | | 29:01.19 | 16 |
| Richard Ringer | 10,000 metres | —N/a | | | | did not finish | |
| Philipp Baar | Marathon | —N/a | | | | 2:19:59 | 38 |
| Tom Gröschel | Marathon | —N/a | | | | 2:15:48 | 11 |
| Jonas Koller | Marathon | —N/a | | | | 2:19:16 | 28 |
| Philipp Pflieger | Marathon | —N/a | | | | did not advance | |
| Sebastian Reinwand | Marathon | —N/a | | | | 2:19:46 | 32 |
| Marcus Schöfisch | Marathon | —N/a | | | | 2:22:57 | 46 |
| Erik Balnuweit | 110 metres hurdles | 13.55 | 3 Q | 13.59 | 16 | did not advance | |
| Alexander John | 110 metres hurdles | 13.69 | 10 q | Disqualified | | did not advance | |
| Gregor Traber | 110 metres hurdles | Bye | | 13.26 SB | 3 Q | 13.46 | 5 |
| Luke Campbell | 400 metres hurdles | Bye | | 49.20 | 9 | did not advance | |
| Martin Grau | 3000 metres steeplechase | 8:33.81 | 19 | —N/a | | did not advance | |
| Johannes Motschmann | 3000 metres steeplechase | 8:51.65 | 26 | —N/a | | did not advance | |
| Patrick Domogala; Robert Hering; Lucas Jakubczyk; Michael Pohl; Julian Reus; Roy Schmidt | 4 × 100 metres relay | did not finish | | —N/a | | did not advance | |
| Fabian Dammermann; Torben Junker; Manuel Sanders; Marvin Schlegel; Patrick Schneider; Johannes Trefz | 4 × 400 metres relay | 3:03.37 | 6 q | —N/a | | 3:04.69 | 8 |
| Nils Brembach | 20 km walk | —N/a | | | | 1:21:25 SB | 5 |
| Christopher Linke | 20 km walk | —N/a | | | | 1:22:33 | 13 |
| Hagen Pohle | 20 km walk | —N/a | | | | 1:21:35 SB | 8 |
| Carl Dohmann | 50 km walk | —N/a | | | | 3:50:27 SB | 5 |
| Karl Junghannß | 50 km walk | —N/a | | | | Disqualified | |
| Nathaniel Seiler | 50 km walk | —N/a | | | | 3:54:08 PB | 8 |

Field events

| Athletes | Event | Qualification | | Final | |
| Athletes | Event | Distance | Position | Distance | Position |
|---|---|---|---|---|---|
| Eike Onnen | High jump | 2.25 | 5 q | 2.19 | 8 |
| Tobias Potye | High jump | 2.21 | 16 | did not advance | |
| Mateusz Przybylko | High jump | 2.25 | 1 q | 2.35 PB | 1st place, gold medalist(s) |
| Bo Kanda Lita Baehre | Pole vault | 5.51 | 15 | did not advance | |
| Raphael Holzdeppe | Pole vault | No mark | | did not advance | |
| Torben Laidig | Pole vault | 5.51 | 13 | did not advance | |
| Maximilian Entholzner | Long jump | 7.46 | 26 | did not advance | |
| Fabian Heinle | Long jump | 8.02 | 2 Q | 8.13 SB | 2nd place, silver medalist(s) |
| Julian Howard | Long jump | 7.64 | 19 | did not advance | |
| Max Heß | Triple jump | 16.32 | 15 | did not advance | |
| David Storl | Shot put | 20.63 | 1 Q | 21.41 | 3rd place, bronze medalist(s) |
| Christoph Harting | Discus throw | No mark | | did not advance | |
| Robert Harting | Discus throw | 63.29 | 7 q | 64.33 | 6 |
| Daniel Jasinski | Discus throw | 60.10 | 19 | did not advance | |
| Andreas Hofmann | Javelin throw | 82.36 | 6 Q | 87.60 | 2nd place, silver medalist(s) |
| Thomas Röhler | Javelin throw | 85.47 | 2 Q | 89.47 | 1st place, gold medalist(s) |
| Johannes Vetter | Javelin throw | 87.39 | 1 Q | 83.72 | 5 |

Combined events – Decathlon

| Athlete | Event | 100 m | LJ | SP | HJ | 400 m | 110H | DT | PV | JT | 1500 m | Final | Rank |
|---|---|---|---|---|---|---|---|---|---|---|---|---|---|
| Arthur Abele | Result | 10.86 | 7.42 SB | 15.64 | 1.93 SB | 48.01 SB | 13.94 SB | 45.42 SB | 4.60 | 68.10 SB | 4:30.84 | 8431 | 1st place, gold medalist(s) |
| Arthur Abele | Points | 892 | 915 | 829 | 740 | 909 | 982 | 775 | 790 | 860 | 739 | 8431 | 1st place, gold medalist(s) |
| Mathias Brugger | Result | 11.05 | NM | 15.92 PB | 1.96 | 47.86 SB | 14.63 | did not start | did not finish | | | | |
| Mathias Brugger | Points | 850 | 0 | 846 | 767 | 916 | 895 | did not start | did not finish | | | | |
| Niklas Kaul | Result | 11.36 | 7.20 | 13.85 | 2.08 | 49.28 | 14.78 | 46.30 PB | 4.70 SB | 67.72 | 4:23.67 SB | 8220 | 4 |
| Niklas Kaul | Points | 782 | 862 | 719 | 878 | 848 | 876 | 794 | 819 | 855 | 787 | 8220 | 4 |

Women
Track and road

| Athletes | Event | Heats | | Semifinal | | Final | |
| Athletes | Event | Result | Rank | Result | Rank | Result | Rank |
|---|---|---|---|---|---|---|---|
| Lisa-Marie Kwayie | 100 metres | 11.30 | 1 Q | 11.36 | 14 | did not advance | |
| Gina Lückenkemper | 100 metres | Bye | | 10.98 | 2 Q | 10.98 | 2nd place, silver medalist(s) |
| Tatjana Pinto | 100 metres | Bye | | 11.26 | 9 | did not advance | |
| Rebekka Haase | 200 metres | 23.44 | 7 Q | 23.42 | 17 | did not advance | |
| Laura Müller | 200 metres | 23.06 SB | 1 Q | 22.87 SB | 8 q | 23.08 | 8 |
| Jessica-Bianca Wessolly | 200 metres | Bye | | 23.26 | 12 | did not advance | |
| Nadine Gonska | 400 metres | 52.54 | 15 | did not advance | | | |
| Christina Hering | 800 metres | 2:01.57 | 7 Q | 2:04.04 | 15 | did not advance | |
| Caterina Granz | 1500 metres | 4:11.46 | 18 | —N/a | | did not advance | |
| Diana Sujew | 1500 metres | 4:12.08 | 19 | —N/a | | did not advance | |
| Hanna Klein | 5000 metres | —N/a | | | | did not finish | |
| Konstanze Klosterhalfen | 5000 metres | —N/a | | | | 15:03.73 SB | 5 |
| Denise Krebs | 5000 metres | —N/a | | | | 16:07.98 | 16 |
| Anna Gehring | 10,000 metres | —N/a | | | | did not finish | |
| Alina Reh | 10,000 metres | —N/a | | | | 32:28.48 | 3rd place, bronze medalist(s) |
| Natalie Tanner | 10,000 metres | —N/a | | | | 33:22.21 | 13 |
| Fabienne Amrhein | Marathon | —N/a | | | | 2:33:44 | 11 |
| Katharina Heinig | Marathon | —N/a | | | | 2:35:00 | 16 |
| Laura Hottenrott | Marathon | —N/a | | | | did not finish | |
| Pamela Dutkiewicz | 100 metres hurdles | Bye | | 12.71 | 1 Q | 12.72 | 2nd place, silver medalist(s) |
| Franziska Hofmann | 100 metres hurdles | 13.23 | 12 | did not advance | | | |
| Ricarda Lobe | 100 metres hurdles | 13.03 | 3 Q | 12.90 PB | 6 q | 13.00 | 5 |
| Cindy Roleder | 100 metres hurdles | Bye | | 12.83 | 4 Q | 12.77 SB | 3rd place, bronze medalist(s) |
| Elena Burkard | 3000 metres steeplechase | 9:34.63 | 10 Q | —N/a | | 9:29.76 PB | 6 |
| Gesa Felicitas Krause | 3000 metres steeplechase | 9:33.51 SB | 3 Q | —N/a | | 9:19.80 SB | 1st place, gold medalist(s) |
| Antje Möldner-Schmidt | 3000 metres steeplechase | 9:52.79 | 27 | —N/a | | did not advance | |
| Jana Sussmann | 3000 metres steeplechase | 9:41.18 | 18 | —N/a | | did not advance | |
| Rebekka Haase; Lisa-Marie Kwayie; Gina Lückenkemper; Tatjana Pinto | 4 × 100 metres relay | 42.34 | 2 Q | —N/a | | 42.23 SB | 3rd place, bronze medalist(s) |
| Nadine Gonska; Svea Köhrbrück; Hannah Mergenthaler; Laura Müller; Karolina Pahlitzsch; Corinna Schwab; Sophia Sommer | 4 × 400 metres relay | 3:31.77 SB | 6 Q | —N/a | | 3:30.33 SB | 6 |
| Saskia Feige | 20 km walk | —N/a | | | | 1:32:57 PB | 16 |
| Emilia Lehmeyer | 20 km walk | —N/a | | | | 1:32:36 PB | 14 |
| Teresa Zurek | 20 km walk | —N/a | | | | 1:35:58 | 20 |

Field events

| Athletes | Event | Qualification | | Final | |
| Athletes | Event | Distance | Position | Distance | Position |
|---|---|---|---|---|---|
| Marie-Laurence Jungfleisch | High jump | 1.90 | 1 q | 1.96 SB | 3rd place, bronze medalist(s) |
| Imke Onnen | High jump | 1.90 | 7 q | 1.82 | 14 |
| Stefanie Dauber | Pole vault | 4.00 | 27 | did not advance | |
| Carolin Hingst | Pole vault | 4.35 | 12 q | 4.30 | 9 |
| Jacqueline Otchere | Pole vault | 4.35 | 16 | did not advance | |
| Malaika Mihambo | Long jump | 6.71 | 3 Q | 6.75 | 1st place, gold medalist(s) |
| Sosthene Moguenara | Long jump | 6.54 | 17 | Did not advance | |
| Alexandra Wester | Long jump | 6.55 | =15 | Did not advance | |
| Neele Eckhardt | Triple jump | 14.33 SB | 3 Q | 14.01 | 10 |
| Kristin Gierisch | Triple jump | 14.31 | 4 Q | 14.45 | 2nd place, silver medalist(s) |
| Jessie Maduka | Triple jump | 13.94 | 15 | did not advance | |
| Sara Gambetta | Shot put | 17.23 | 11 Q | 18.13 SB | 5 |
| Alina Kenzel | Shot put | 17.46 | 7 Q | 17.26 | 9 |
| Christina Schwanitz | Shot put | 18.83 | 1 Q | 19.19 | 2nd place, silver medalist(s) |
| Shanice Craft | Discus throw | 61.13 | 2 Q | 62.46 | 3rd place, bronze medalist(s) |
| Nadine Müller | Discus throw | 60.64 | 3 Q | 63.00 SB | 2nd place, silver medalist(s) |
| Claudine Vita | Discus throw | 59.18 | 5 Q | 61.25 | 4 |
| Dana Bergrath | Javelin throw | 53.61 | 20 | did not advance | |
| Christin Hussong | Javelin throw | 67.29 PB | 1 Q | 67.90 CR | 1st place, gold medalist(s) |
| Katharina Molitor | Javelin throw | 58.00 | 15 | did not advance | |
| Kathrin Klaas | Hammer throw | 68.64 | 12 q | 71.50 SB | 7 |

Combined events – Heptathlon

| Athlete | Event | 100H | HJ | SP | 200 m | LJ | JT | 800 m | Final | Rank |
|---|---|---|---|---|---|---|---|---|---|---|
| Mareike Arndt | Result | 13.64 | 1.64 | 14.65 | 23.61 PB | 5.91 | 42.58 | DNS | did not finish | |
| Mareike Arndt | Points | 1030 | 783 | 837 | 1018 | 822 | 717 | 0 | did not finish | |
| Louisa Grauvogel | Result | 12.97 | 1.76 PB | 11.97 | 23.10 PB | 6.15 PB | 43.29 | DNS | did not finish | |
| Louisa Grauvogel | Points | 1129 | 928 | 659 | 1069 | 896 | 731 | 0 | did not finish | |
| Carolin Schäfer | Result | 13.33 | 1.79 | 14.12 | 23.75 | 6.24 SB | 53.73 PB | 2:14.65 SB | 6602 SB | 3rd place, bronze medalist(s) |
| Carolin Schäfer | Points | 1075 | 966 | 802 | 1005 | 924 | 932 | 898 | 6602 SB | 3rd place, bronze medalist(s) |

== See also ==
- Germany at the 2018 European Championships
