= Czech Republic at the 2018 European Athletics Championships =

- WA code: CZE
- National federation: ČAS
- Website: www.atletika.cz

in Berlin
- Competitors: 50 (26 men and 24 women) in 31 events
- Medals Ranked 20th: Gold 0 Silver 2 Bronze 1 Total 3

European Athletics Championships appearances
- 1994; 1998; 2002; 2006; 2010; 2012; 2014; 2016; 2018; 2022; 2024; 2026

Other related appearances
- Czechoslovakia (1934–1990)

Czech Republic competed at the 2018 European Athletics Championships in Berlin, Germany, from 6–12 August 2018. A delegation of 50 athletes were sent to represent the country.

The following athletes were selected to compete by the Czech Athletics Federation.

== Medals ==
Medal	Name	Event	Date
Silver	Nikola Ogrodníková	Women's javelin throw	10 August
Silver	Anežka Drahotová	Women's 20 kilometres walk	11 August
Bronze	Eva Vrabcová-Nývltová	Women's marathon	12 August

== Results ==
Men
Track and road

Athletes	Event	Heats		Semifinal		Final	
Athletes	Event	Result	Rank	Result	Rank	Result	Rank
Zdeněk Stromšík	100 metres	10.39	14 q	10.37	17	did not advance	
Jan Veleba	100 metres	10.52	25	did not advance			
Dominik Záleský	100 metres	10.55	31	did not advance			
Jan Jirka	200 metres	21.15	21	did not advance			
Michal Desenský	400 metres	46.68	21	did not advance			
Pavel Maslák	400 metres	45.83	9 q	45.59 SB	16	did not advance	
Patrik Šorm	400 metres	46.52	18	did not advance			
Lukáš Hodboď	800 metres	1:46.50 PB	5 Q	1:46.57	8 q	1:46.60	8
Filip Šnejdr	800 metres	1:48.70	26	did not advance			
Jakub Holuša	1500 metres	3:49.82	24	—N/a		did not advance	
Jakub Zemaník	10,000 metres	—N/a				did not finish	
Michal Brož	400 metres hurdles	50.74	11 q	50.31	19	did not advance	
Vít Müller	400 metres hurdles	51.00	16	did not advance			
Martin Tuček	400 metres hurdles	51.63	21	did not advance			
Jan Jirka; Jiří Kubeš; Pavel Maslák; Zdeněk Stromšík; Jan Veleba; Dominik Záleský	4 × 100 metres relay	38.94 SB	6 q	—N/a		did not start	
Michal Desenský; Roman Flaška; Pavel Maslák; Vít Müller; Patrik Šorm; Jan Tesař	4 × 400 metres relay	3:02.52 NR	3 Q	—N/a		3:03.00	7
Lukáš Gdula	50 km walk	—N/a				4:05:44	21

Field events

Athletes	Event	Qualification		Final	
Athletes	Event	Distance	Position	Distance	Position
Jan Kudlička	Pole vault	5.36	25	did not advance	
Radek Juška	Long jump	7.87	7 q	7.73	12
Tomáš Staněk	Shot put	19.77	11 q	21.16	4
Petr Frydrych	Javelin throw	79.74	12 q	72.79	12
Jaroslav Jílek	Javelin throw	75.83	19	did not advance	
Jakub Vadlejch	Javelin throw	80.28	10 q	80.64	8

Combined events – Decathlon

Athlete	Event	100 m	LJ	SP	HJ	400 m	110H	DT	PV	JT	1500 m	Final	Rank
Jan Doležal	Result	11.06 =SB	7.12	14.03	2.02 PB	49.42 PB	14.58	45.81	4.80	62.67 PB	4:41.27 PB	8067	8
Jan Doležal	Points	847	842	730	822	842	901	784	849	778	672	8067	8
Marek Lukáš	Result	11.12	6.99 SB	14.04	1.87	50.60 SB	14.67	39.41	4.60	64.19	4:37.03 SB	7683	14
Marek Lukáš	Points	834	811	731	687	787	890	653	790	801	699	7683	14

Women
Track and road

Athletes	Event	Heats		Semifinal		Final	
Athletes	Event	Result	Rank	Result	Rank	Result	Rank
Klára Seidlová	100 metres	11.63	15	did not advance			
Marcela Pírková	200 metres	23.72	15	did not advance			
Zdeňka Seidlová	400 metres	53.38	28	did not advance			
Alena Symerská	400 metres	53.25	25	did not advance			
Lada Vondrová	400 metres	53.21 PB	24	did not advance			
Kristiina Mäki	1500 metres	4:10.35 SB	14	—N/a		did not advance	
Diana Mezuliáníková	1500 metres	4:09.98	10 q	—N/a		4:07.82	10
Simona Vrzalová	1500 metres	4:09.11	5 q	—N/a		4:06.47	5
Eva Vrabcová-Nývltová	Marathon	—N/a				2:26:31 NR	3rd place, bronze medalist(s)
Zuzana Hejnová	400 metres hurdles	—N/a		56.03	13	did not advance	
Lucie Sekanová	3000 metres steeplechase	9:50.38 SB	25	—N/a		did not advance	
Lucie Domská; Barbora Dvořáková; Marcela Pírková; Klára Seidlová; Zdeňka Seidlová; Jana Slaninová	4 × 100 metres relay	44.12 SB	12	—N/a		did not advance	
Anežka Drahotová	20 km walk	—N/a				1:27:03 SB	2nd place, silver medalist(s)

Field events

Athletes	Event	Qualification		Final	
Athletes	Event	Distance	Position	Distance	Position
Michaela Hrubá	High jump	1.86	12 q	1.91 SB	6
Lada Pejchalová	High jump	1.81	18	did not advance	
Amálie Švábíková	Pole vault	4.45	10 q	4.30	9
Markéta Červenková	Shot put	16.62	17	did not advance	
Eliška Staňková	Discus throw	57.81	9 q	57.04	12
Nikola Ogrodníková	Javelin throw	61.27	4 Q	61.85	2nd place, silver medalist(s)
Irena Šedivá	Javelin throw	59.34	11 q	59.76	7
Kateřina Šafránková	Hammer throw	64.85	22	did not advance	

Combined events – Heptathlon

Athlete	Event	100H	HJ	SP	200 m	LJ	JT	800 m	Final	Rank
Kateřina Cachová	Result	13.29 =SB	1.85 =PB	12.71 SB	24.25 SB	6.36 =SB	44.64 SB	2:14.91	6400 PB	6
Kateřina Cachová	Points	1081	1041	708	957	962	757	894	6400 PB	6
