= Israel at the 2018 European Athletics Championships =

- WA code: ISR
- National federation: IAA
- Website: www.iaa.co.il

in Berlin
- Competitors: 8
- Medals: Gold 1 Silver 0 Bronze 0 Total 1

European Athletics Championships appearances
- 1990; 1994; 1998; 2002; 2006; 2010; 2012; 2014; 2016; 2018; 2022; 2024

Israel competed at the 2018 European Athletics Championships in Berlin, Germany, on 6–12 August 2018. A delegation of 9 athletes were sent to represent the country.

The following athletes were selected to compete by the Israeli Athletics Federation.

== Medals ==
Medal	Name	Event	Date
Gold	Lonah Chemtai Salpeter	10,000 metres	8 August

Men
Track and road

Athletes	Event	Heats		Semifinal		Final	
Athletes	Event	Result	Rank	Result	Rank	Result	Rank
Donald Blair-Sanford	400 metres	46.00	12 Q	45.68	18	did not advance	
Girmaw Amare	10,000 metres	—				30:11.91	25
Maru Teferi	Marathon	—				2:13.00 NR	7

Field events

Athletes	Event	Qualification		Final	
Athletes	Event	Distance	Position	Distance	Position
Dmitriy Kroyter	High jump	2.21	16	did not advance	

Women
Track and road

Athletes	Event	Heats		Semifinal		Final	
Athletes	Event	Result	Rank	Result	Rank	Result	Rank
Diana Vaisman	100 metres	11.61	14	did not advance			
Lonah Chemtai Salpeter	5000 metres	—				Disqualified	
Lonah Chemtai Salpeter	10,000 metres	—				31:43.29	1st place, gold medalist(s)
Adva Cohen	3000 metres steeplechase	9:36.13 NR	12 q	—		9:29.74 NR	5

Field events

Athletes	Event	Qualification		Final	
Athletes	Event	Distance	Position	Distance	Position
Hanna Minenko	Triple jump	14.41 SB	2 Q	14.37	5
