= Authorised Neutral Athletes at the 2018 European Athletics Championships =

- This flag version is not correct. Please click here to see the correct one.
- WA code: ANA

in Berlin
- Competitors: 29 (17 men and 12 women) in 20 events
- Medals: Gold 1 Silver 3 Bronze 2 Total 6

European Athletics Championships appearances
- 2016; 2018; 2022; 2024; 2026

Other related appearances
- Soviet Union (1946–1990); Russia (1994–2014)

Due to past doping rules violations by the Russian Athletics Federation, the IAAF classified Russian athletes at the 2018 European Athletics Championships as "Authorized Neutral Athletes" instead of counting them as Russian participants.

The IAAF initiated the removal of Russian athletes from international competitions in November 2015 due to the doping scandal in RusFA. This decision was upheld in a 27 July 2018 decision at the IAAF Council, despite the compliance by the Russian side of most of the obligations delegated to it by the IAAF.

At the same time, the IAAF allows several Russian athletes to participate in the international competitions, where they would be considered neutral athletes. Thirty of them were allowed by the organizers to participate in the 2018 European Athletics Championships.

== Medals ==
Medal	Name	Event	Date
Gold	Mariya Lasitskene	Women's high jump	10 August
Silver	Ilya Shkurenyov	Men's decathlon	8 August
Silver	Sergey Shubenkov	Men's 110 metres hurdles	10 August
Silver	Timur Morgunov	Men's pole vault	12 August
Bronze	Vasiliy Mizinov	Men's 20 km walk	11 August
Bronze	Ilya Ivanyuk	Men's high jump	11 August

== Results ==
=== Men ===
Track & road events

Athlete	Event	Heat		Semifinal		Final	
Athlete	Event	Result	Rank	Result	Rank	Result	Rank
Rinas Akhmadiyev	5000 m	—N/a				13:24.43	7
Yevgeny Rybakov	10000 m	—N/a				29:15.30	20
Sergey Shubenkov	110 m hurdles	Bye		13.24	1 Q	13.17	2nd place, silver medalist(s)
Timofey Chalyy	400 m hurdles	Bye		48.89	3 q	49.41	8
Aleksandr Skorobogatko	400 m hurdles	50.74	3 q	DNF		Did not advance	
Vasiliy Mizinov	20 km walk	—N/a				1:20.50	3rd place, bronze medalist(s)

Field Events

Athlete	Event	Qualification		Final	
Athlete	Event	Distance	Rank	Distance	Rank
Aleksey Fyodorov	Triple jump	16.29	16	Did not advance	
Ilya Ivanyuk	High jump	2.25	7 q	2.31	3rd place, bronze medalist(s)
Georgiy Gorokhov	Pole vault	5.36	17	Did not advance	
Timur Morgunov	Pole vault	5.61	9 q	6.00	2nd place, silver medalist(s)
Ilya Mudrov	Pole vault	NM	–	Did not advance	
Maksim Afonin	Shot put	20.33	5 q	20.68	8
Aleksandr Lesnoy	Shot put	20.47	4 Q	21.04	5
Viktor Butenko	Discus throw	62.63	8 q	62.24	9
Denis Lukyanov	Hammer throw	73.19	12 q	71.71	12
Aleksey Sokirskiy	Hammer throw	72.97	14	Did not advance	

Combined events – Decathlon

Athlete	Event	100 m	LJ	SP	HJ	400 m	110H	DT	PV	JT	1500 m	Final	Rank
Ilya Shkurenyov	Result	11.12	7.55	13.43	2.02	48.95	14.44	45.53	5.30	59.13	4:31.38	8321	2nd place, silver medalist(s)
Ilya Shkurenyov	Points	834	947	693	822	864	918	778	1004	725	736	8321	2nd place, silver medalist(s)

=== Women ===
Track & road events

Athlete	Event	Heat		Semifinal		Final	
Athlete	Event	Result	Rank	Result	Rank	Result	Rank
Kseniya Aksyonova	400 m	53.37	8	Did not advance			
Alyona Mamina	400 m	52.72	5	Did not advance			
Polina Miller	400 m	52.01	1 Q	51.65	5	Did not advance	
Vera Rudakova	400 m hurdles	56.24	1 Q	55.24	4 q	55.89	6
Yana Smerdova	20 km walk	—N/a				DQ	

Field Events

Athlete	Event	Qualification		Final	
Athlete	Event	Distance	Rank	Distance	Rank
Anna Krylova	Triple jump	13.05	27	Did not advance	
Mariya Lasitskene	High jump	1.90	1 q	2.00	1st place, gold medalist(s)
Olga Mullina	Pole vault	4.45	4 q	4.30	11
Anzhelika Sidorova	Pole vault	4.50	2 q	4.70	4
Yuliya Maltseva	Discus throw	53.50	25	Did not advance	
Sofiya Palkina	Hammer throw	69.74	7 q	68.64	10
Yelizaveta Tsareva	Hammer throw	68.35	13	Did not advance	

Key

- Q = Qualified for the next round
- q = Qualified for the next round as a fastest loser or, in field events, by position without achieving the qualifying target
- N/A = Round not applicable for the event
- Bye = Athlete not required to compete in round
