= Alina Tsviliy =

Ukrainian race walker

Personal information
- Born: 18 September 1994 (age 31)

Sport
- Country: Ukraine
- Sport: Athletics
- Event: 50 km race walk

Alina Tsviliy (Ukrainian: Аліна Цвілій; born as Alina Halchenko 18 September 1994) is a Ukrainian race walker.

== Career ==
In 2018 she won silver medal at the 2018 European Athletics Championships and set a new national record at the championships. But she was later disqualified for the period from 2 August 2018 until 3 May 2021.

She studied at the State Pedagogical University in Pereiaslav.

== Achievements ==
| Year | Competition | Venue | Position | Event | Notes |
Representing Ukraine
| 2018 | European Championships | Berlin, Germany | DSQ | 50 km | 4:12:44 NR |
