= Authorised Neutral Athletes =

International designation for Neutral Athletes

The flag/emblem of AIN for the Olympics (since 2024)

The flag/logo of ANA for World Athletics events (since 2021)

Authorised Neutral Athlete (ANA) and Individual Neutral Athlete (AIN) are a capacity under which athletes can compete at international sporting competitions without representing their nations, as is standard convention under the Olympic Charter. As of August 2022, only Russian and Belarusian athletes of some sports have competed or are competing within the ANA capacity.

Originally introduced in athletics in 2017 following the Russian doping scandal which first came to light in December 2014, the term was introduced to other sports following the Russian invasion of Ukraine in February 2022. Quoting a breach of the Olympic Truce by the Russian government in which Belarus was complicit, the International Olympic Committee (IOC) recommended suspending all teams, officials and competitors from Russia and Belarus from being involved in sport due to security concerns, while allowing individuals to compete in a neutral capacity.

The ANA designation uses a plain white flag with the block capital letters "ANA".

== Russian doping scandal and athletics ==
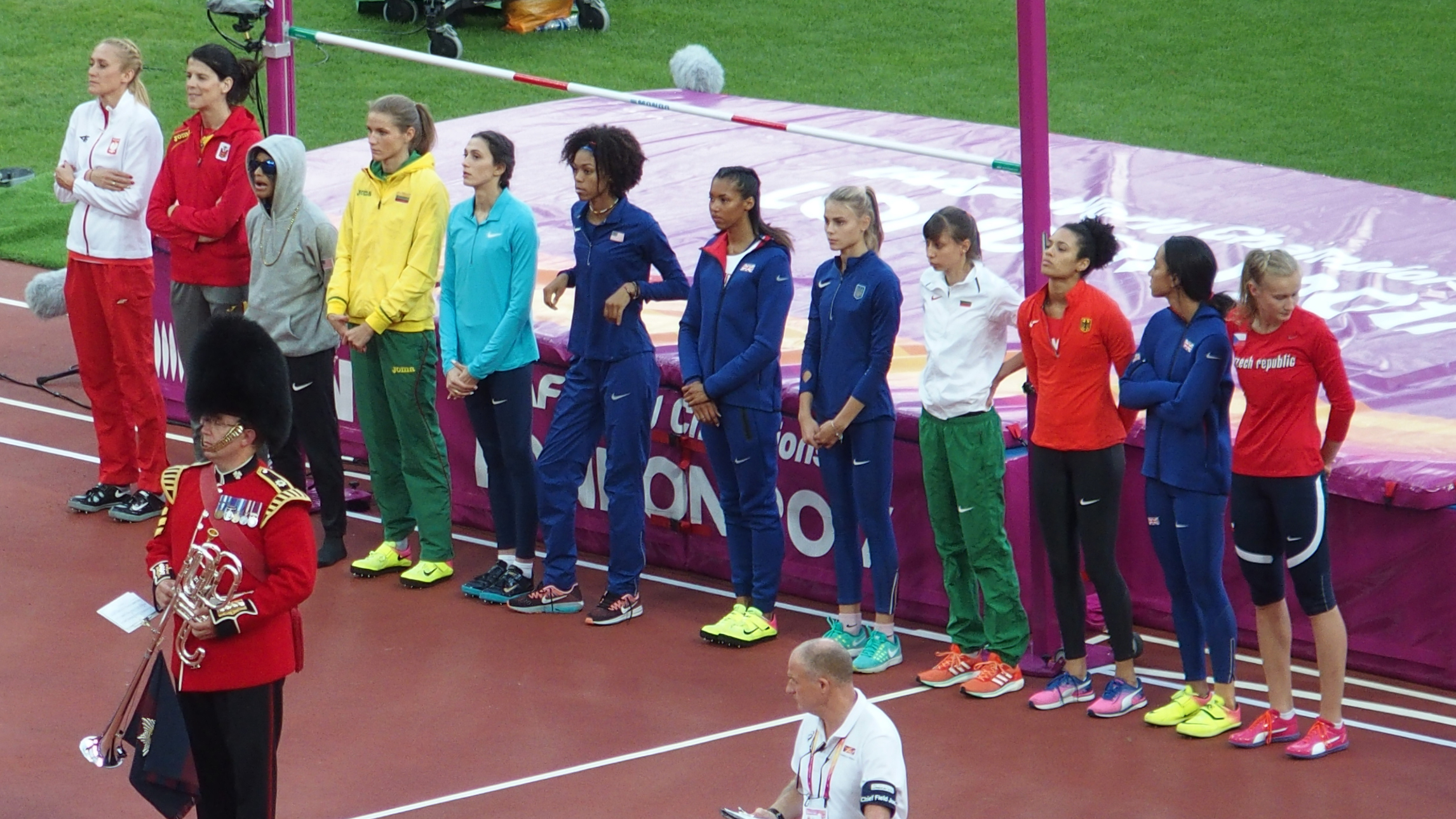
While all other athletes wear clothing bearing a national flag, Authorised Neutral Athlete Mariya Lasitskene from Russia (left of center, turquoise) is the only athlete to wear generic Nike clothing

The previous version of the flag/logo of ANA for IAAF events (2017–2020)

The idea of competing as "neutral athletes" was first proposed in 2016 by the World Anti-Doping Agency and the governing body of athletics, International Association of Athletics Federation (IAAF) at the conclusion of an investigation into Russian state manipulation of doping controls. Around the same time, Russian track and field athlete Yuliya Stepanova requested to compete as a neutral instead of representing her country at the 2016 Rio de Janeiro Olympic Games. The IOC ruled against the proposal stating that it ran contrary to the Olympic Charter, also announcing they would continue to permit Russian competitors at the games subject to approval by the international federation concerned of the sports composing the games, and doping clearance approved outside of Russia.

The IAAF had already imposed an outright ban on track and field athletes competing but following an appeal at the Court of Arbitration for Sport by Darya Klishina, a Russian Long Jumper based in the United States, the IAAF was forced to allow athletes who passed anti-doping test outside of Russia. Klishina was the only track and field athlete to represent Russia at the 2016 Olympic Games.

In April 2017 at IAAF World Championships in Athletics of London 2017, with the IAAF free to apply their own rules, approved the participation of a group of 19 Russians competing as neutral athletes, the first time the Authorised Neutral Athlete term was used. A total of eight athletes competed as neutrals at the 2018 IAAF World Indoor Championships. A total of nine athletes competed as neutrals at the 2018 IAAF World U20 Championships. A total of 30 athletes competed as neutrals at the 2018 European Athletics Championships. A total of 29 athletes competed as neutrals at the 2019 World Championships in Doha.

== Russian invasion of Ukraine ==
In response to the invasion, many sports' governing bodies immediately banned Russians and Belarusians from competing altogether, including in athletics whose Russians were already competing as authorised neutrals.

In tennis, the International Tennis Federation allowed Russians and Belarusians to continue playing as individuals without any national representation, but did not implement any designated group or category name.

In motorsport, the Fédération Internationale de l'Automobile, a recognised International Sports Federation by the IOC, followed the recommendation to allow drivers, competitors and officials to continue competing in a neutral capacity. Although the FIA press release used the terms Authorised Neutral Competitor (ANC), Authorised Neutral Driver (AND) and Authorised Neutral Official (ANO), it was widely accepted that the term Authorised Neutral Athlete could also be used. Indeed, in the FIA World Rally Championship, Russians including Nikolay Gryazin and Konstantin Aleksandrov began competing under the Authorised Neutral Athlete flag immediately following the ruling. Whilst it is not confirmed as the intended reason, this helps to avoid confusion with the country code AND for Andorra. In FIA Formula Three circuit racing, Russian driver Alexander Smolyar is included on entry lists as having an 'AND' license, meanwhile in the GT World Challenge Europe, Russian drivers appear on entry lists as having ND license and nationality on profiles and no flag is ever presented in either championship.

In cycling, the Union Cycliste Internationale (UCI) also permitted athletes to continue competing in a neutral capacity whilst banning all Russian and Belarusian teams, officials and events. The UCI requested event organisers to replace the names, emblems and colours of the two countries with a "neutral reference or denomination". So far, affected cyclists have not raced under any form of neutral name in events such as the Tour de France.

In the Olga Kharlan handshaking incident at the 2023 World Fencing Championships, Russian sabre fencer Anna Smirnova competed as an Authorised Neutral Athlete against Ukrainian Olga Kharlan. At the end of the bout the fencers came to the center of the strip and Smirnova extended her hand to Kharlan, who in turn extended her saber in an offer to the Russian to tap blades. Kharlan said her choice of salute was meant as a sign of respect for her Russian opponent, while still acknowledging the ongoing conflict between Ukraine and Russia. For refusing to shake her opponent's hand, Kharlan was disqualified by FIE officials. The decision was reversed the following day.

== See also ==
- Authorised Neutral Athletes at the 2017 World Championships in Athletics
- Authorised Neutral Athletes at the 2018 European Athletics Championships
- Authorised Neutral Athletes at the 2019 World Athletics Championships
- Athlete Refugee Team
- Independent Olympic Athletes
- Unified Team, designation of post-Soviet state athletes for 1992 events
- Olympic Athletes from Russia, designation for cleared athletes at the 2018 Winter Olympics
- Commonwealth of Independent States (CIS national football team competed at the UEFA Euro 1992)
- Russian Olympic Committee
  - Russian Olympic Committee athletes at the 2020 Summer Olympics
  - Russian Olympic Committee athletes at the 2022 Winter Olympics
- Individual Neutral Athletes at the 2024 Summer Olympics
- Individual Neutral Athletes at the 2026 Winter Olympics
