= Balkan Masters Athletics Championships =

Annual athletics competition in the Balkans

The Balkan Masters Athletics Championships is an annual international athletics competition between masters athletes aged 35 and over from nations in the Balkans. It is typically held over two or three days in September. It features a full programme of track and field events, plus a half marathon. Organised by Balkan Masters Athletics, it was first held in 1991 and has been held every year since. The competition was the organisation's first regular championships, and was followed by a Balkan Masters Cross Country Championships in 2007 and a Balkan Masters Indoor Athletics Championships in 2015.

== Nations ==
1. Albania
2. Bosnia and Herzegovina
3. Bulgaria
4. Croatia
5. Greece
6. Moldova
7. Montenegro
8. North Macedonia
9. Romania
10. Serbia
11. Slovenia
12. Turkey
13. Kosovo

== Editions ==
=== Outdoor ===
Edition	Year	City	Country	Dates
1	1991	Athens	Greece	21 September
2	1992	Istanbul	Turkey	19 September
3	1993	Bucharest	Romania	18–19 September
4	1994	Sofia	Bulgaria	17–18 September
5	1995	Istanbul	Turkey	16–17 September
6	1996	Athens	Greece	28–29 September
7	1997	Bucharest	Romania	6–7 September
8	1998	Thessaloniki	Greece	11–12 July
9	1999	İzmir	Turkey	23–24 October
10	2000	Katerini	Greece	9–10 September
11	2001	Belgrade	Serbia	15–16 September
12	2002	Istanbul	Turkey	7–8 September
13	2003	Katerini	Greece	20–21 September
14	2004	Istanbul	Turkey	11–12 September
15	2005	Novi Sad	Serbia	24–25 September
16	2006	Athens	Greece	23–24 September
17	2007	Plovdiv	Bulgaria	6–7 October
18	2008	Bar	Montenegro	4–5 October
19	2009	İzmir	Turkey	26–27 September
20	2010	Larissa	Greece	18–19 September
21	2011	Domžale	Slovenia	2–4 September
22	2012	İzmir	Turkey	21–23 September
23	2013	Zagreb	Croatia	6–8 September
24	2014	Bucharest	Romania	19–21 September
25	2015	Thessaloniki	Greece	18–19 September
26	2016	Novi Sad	Serbia	23–25 September
27	2017	Stara Zagora	Bulgaria	22–24 September
28	2018	Celje	Slovenia	21–23 September
29	2019	Bucharest	Romania	19–22 September
30	2021	Korçë	Albania	17–19 September
31	2022	Thessaloniki	Greece	23–25 September

2020 not held.

=== Indoor ===
1. 21-22/2/2015, Istanbul, Turkey
2. 12-13/3/2016, Bucharest, Romania
3. 10-11/3/2018, Belgrade, Serbia
4. 02-03/03/2019, Istanbul, Turkey
5. 07-08/03/2020, Belgrade, Serbia
6. 12-13/03/2022, Novo Mesto, Slovenia

=== Cross Country ===
1. 15/4/2007, Smederevo, Serbia
2. 2008, Plovdiv, Bulgaria
3. 5/4/2009, Tirana, Albania
4. 2010, Istanbul, Turkey
5. 29/4/2012, Belgrade, Serbia
6. 14/4/2013, Athens, Greece
7. 13/4/2014, Bucharest, Romania
8. 12/3/2016, Bucharest, Romania

== Medals ==
=== Outdoor ===
1991-2022:

Rank	Nation	Gold	Silver	Bronze	Total
1	Greece	1,971	1,445	1,074	4,490
2	Romania	1,578	1,077	740	3,395
3	Bulgaria	1,267	829	603	2,699
4	Turkey	1,117	994	699	2,810
5	Slovenia	749	402	251	1,402
6	Serbia	522	479	354	1,355
7	Croatia	329	244	169	742
8	Bosnia and Herzegovina	132	93	53	278
9	Albania	117	88	156	361
10	Montenegro	103	74	55	232
11	Moldova	59	33	24	116
12	Kosovo	5	3	9	17
13	North Macedonia	3	7	7	17
Totals (13 entries)		7,952	5,768	4,194	17,914

30th Albania 2021:

=== Indoor ===
2015-2018:
