= Dwayne Cowan =

English sprinter (born 1985)

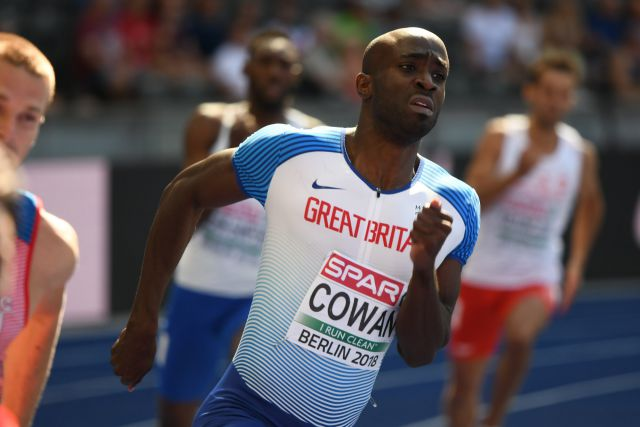
- Cowan in 2018

Personal information
- Born: 1 January 1985 (age 41) London, England, United Kingdom
- Height: 1.95 m (6 ft 5 in)
- Weight: 85 kg (187 lb)

Sport
- Sport: Athletics
- Event: 400 metres
- Club: Hercules Wimbledon; Sale Harriers Manchester
- Coached by: Lloyd Cowan
Medal record
Men's athletics
Representing Great Britain
World Championships
Bronze medal – third place	2017 London	4×400 m relay
European Championships
Silver medal – second place	2018 Berlin	4×400 m relay
European Team Championships
Gold medal – first place	2017 Lille	400 m

Dwayne Cowan (born 1 January 1985) is an English sprinter, based in Merton and a member of Hercules Wimbledon Athletic Club. Before taking up sprinting, Dwayne was a semi-professional footballer. He made his international debut at the 2017 European Team Championships, winning the 400 metres. At his first Diamond League event, the London Anniversary Games, he came third. Cowan was selected to represent Great Britain and Northern Ireland at the 2017 World Championships

== Personal bests ==
- 400m: outdoors 45.36s (London 2017), indoors 47.67s (Sheffield 2015).
- 4 × 400 m split: 44.10s
- 200m: 20.73 seconds (Lee Valley)
