= Mary Abichi =

British track and field sprinter (born 1990)

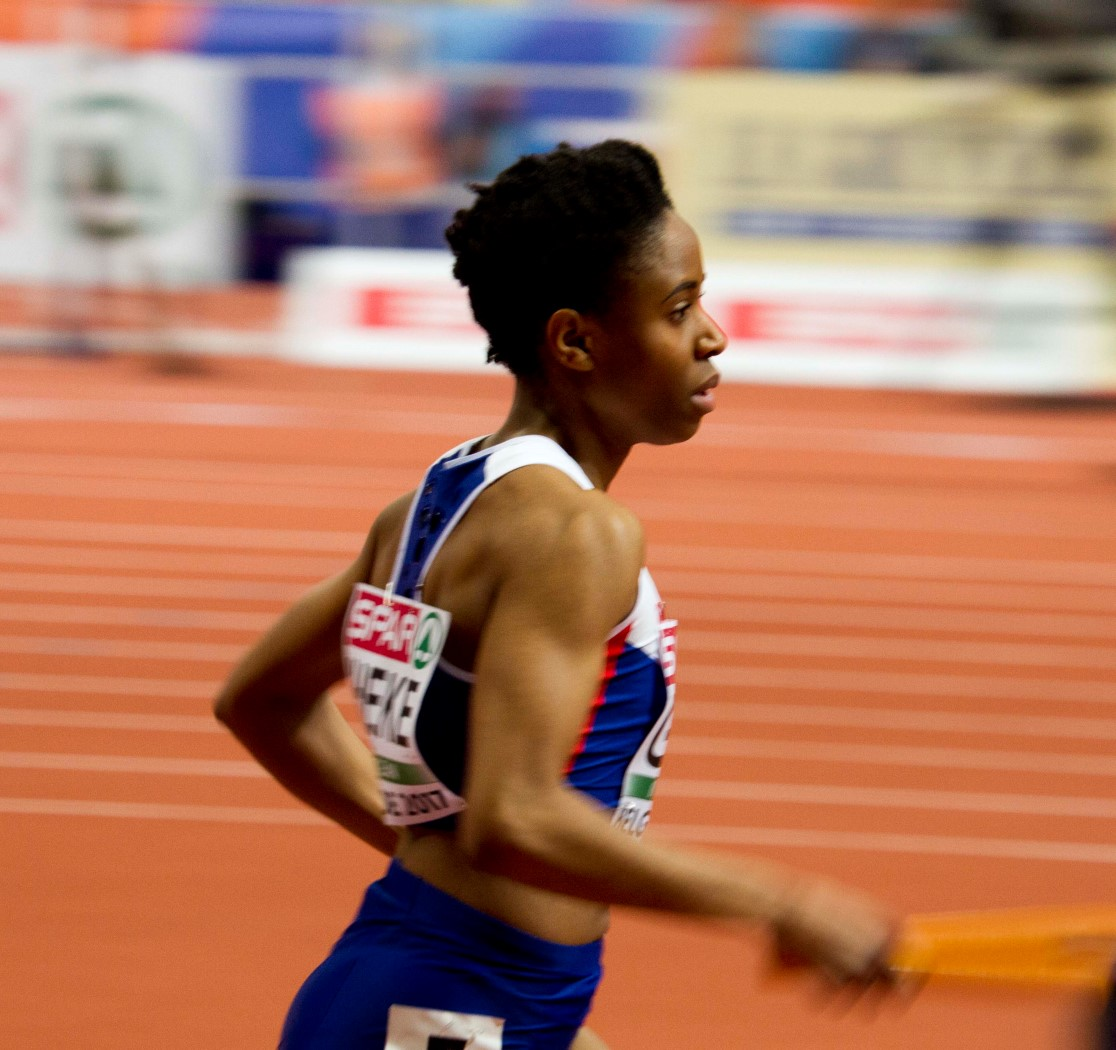

Personal information
- Full name: Mary Chinwe Abichi
- Born: Mary Chinwe Iheke; 19 November 1990 (age 35)

Sport
- Country: Great Britain
- Sport: Athletics
- Event: 400 metres
- Club: Enfield and Haringey Athletic Club

Achievements and titles
- Personal best: 400 m: 52.60 (2017)
Medal record
European Athletics Indoor Championships
Silver medal – second place	2017 Belgrade	4 × 400 m relay
European Athletics Championships
Bronze medal – third place	2018 Berlin	4 × 400 m relay

Mary Chinwe Abichi // (née Iheke; born 19 November 1990) is a British track and field sprinter. She specialises in the 400 metres and holds a personal best of 52.60 seconds. She has won medals with the British 4 × 400 metres relay team at the European Athletics Indoor Championships and the European Athletics Championships.

Abichi began sprinting at an early age with her local club, Kingston Athletic Club and Polytechnic Harriers. Her first national level competitions came in 2007, where she was third in the 300 metres at the English Schools' Athletics Championships and fifth at the English Indoor Under-17 Championships. She was the 400 metres runner-up to behind Shelayna Oskan-Clarke at both the 2008 English Schools Championships and the 2009 English Indoor Under-20 Championships. She was behind Oskan-Clarke again at the 2010 English Under-23 Championships, finishing fourth.

Abichi undertook an undergraduate degree at University College London from 2009 to 2012, and she did not compete in athletics during her final two years there. She returned to action in 2013, taking part in her first British Athletics Championships and winning sub-national 400 m titles at the CAU Inter-County Championships and the Surrey Country Championships. She was a 400 m semi-finalist at the 2014 British Indoor Athletics Championships and placed fifth at the 2014 British Athletics Championships, the latter in a personal best of 52.89 seconds. She also won titles in 200 m indoor and 400 m outdoors at the South of England Athletics Championships. She competed sparingly in 2015 and 2016, but did win at the 2015 English Athletics Championships and place fifth at the 2016 British Athletics Championships. She moved to train under coach Frank Adams in 2016 at Enfield and Haringey Athletic Club.

The 2017 season proved to be a breakthrough for 26-year-old Abichi. at the 2017 British Indoor Athletics Championships she came fifth and earned a place on the international 4 × 400 metres relay team for the 2017 European Athletics Indoor Championships. Running alongside teammates Eilidh Doyle, Philippa Lowe and Laviai Nielsen, the British women came away with a silver medal behind Poland. Her first individual selection followed that summer, resulting in a sixth place finish at the 2017 European Team Championships Super League in a new personal best of 52.60 seconds. That time ranked her in the country's top ten 400 m runners that year. Top six finishes at the national championships in 2018 brought her another international outing at the 2018 European Athletics Championships, where she shared in the relay bronze medals as a heats runner. She began self-coaching and came close to the national podium with fourth place at the 2019 British Athletics Championships in a time of 52.63 seconds (her second fastest ever at that point). Abichi also returned to academia during this time, undertaking a master's degree in neurosciences at King's College London.

== International competitions ==
Year	Competition	Venue	Position	Event	Notes
2017	European Indoor Championships	Belgrade, Serbia	2nd	4 × 400 m relay	3:31.05
2017	European Team Championships	Lille, France	6th	400 m	52.60
2018	European Championships	Berlin, Germany	2nd (h)	4 × 400 m relay	3:28.12
2023	European Indoor Championships	Istanbul, Turkey	6th	4 × 400 m relay	3:32.65

== See also ==
- List of European Athletics Championships medalists (women)
- List of European Athletics Indoor Championships medalists (women)
