= 2018 European Athletics Championships – Women's 50 kilometres walk =

Women's 50 kilometres walk at the 2018 European Athletics Championships
- Venue: Olympic Stadium
- Location: Berlin
- Dates: 7 August 2018
- Competitors: 19 from 13 nations
- Winning time: 4:09:21

Medalists
gold medal	Inês Henriques	Portugal
silver medal	Júlia Takács	Spain
bronze medal	Khrystyna Yudkina	Ukraine

The women's 50 kilometres race walk at the 2018 European Athletics Championships took place in Berlin on 7 August.

== Records ==
Standing records prior to the 2018 European Athletics Championships
World record	Liang Rui (CHN)	4:04:36	Taicang, China	5 May 2018
European record	Inês Henriques (POR)	4:05:56	London, Great Britain	13 August 2017
Championship record	New event			
World Leading	Liang Rui (CHN)	4:04:36	Taicang, China	5 May 2018
European Leading	Júlia Takács (ESP)	4:13:04	Burjassot, Spain	25 February 2018
Broken records during the 2018 European Athletics Championships
Championship record	Inês Henriques (POR)	4:09:21	Berlin, Germany	7 August 2018
European Leading	Inês Henriques (POR)	4:09:21	Berlin, Germany	7 August 2018

== Schedule ==
Date	Time	Round
7 August 2018	8:35	Final

== Results ==
=== Final ===
Rank	Name	Nationality	Time	Note
1st place, gold medalist(s)	Inês Henriques	Portugal	4:09:21	CR, EL
2nd place, silver medalist(s)	Júlia Takács	Spain	4:15:22	
3rd place, bronze medalist(s)	Khrystyna Yudkina	Ukraine	4:20:46	PB
4	Mária Czaková	Slovakia	4:24:59	
5	Ainhoa Pinedo	Spain	4:27:03	
6	Mar Juárez	Spain	4:28:58	PB
7	Dušica Topić	Serbia	4:30:43	NR
8	Mariavittoria Becchetti	Italy	4:31:41	PB
9	Nadzeya Darazhuk	Belarus	4:35:14	
10	Ivana Renić	Croatia	4:35:39	NR
11	Tiia Kuikka	Finland	4:35:56	
12	Lucie Champalou	France	4:52:38	
	Joanna Bemowska	Poland	DNF	
	Agnieszka Ellward	Poland	DNF	
	Semiha Mutlu	Turkey	DNF	
	Nastassia Yatsevich	Belarus	DNF	
	Anett Torma	Hungary	DQ	230.7 (a)
	Alina Tsviliy	Ukraine	DQ	~~4:12:44 NR~~
	Vasylyna Vitovshchyk	Ukraine	DQ	~~4:23:15 PB~~
