= Amy Allcock =

British sprinter

Personal information
- Nationality: British
- Born: 20 August 1993 (age 32) London, England

Sport
- Sport: Athletics
- Event: Sprinting
Medal record
World Indoor Championships
Bronze medal – third place	2018 Birmingham	4×400 m
European Championships
Bronze medal – third place	2018 Berlin	4 x 400m relay

Amy Allcock (born 20 August 1993) is a British athlete. She competed in the women's 4 × 400 metres relay at the 2018 IAAF World Indoor Championships.
