= Azerbaijan Athletics Federation =

Sports governing body in Azerbaijan

- Sport: Athletics
- Abbreviation: AAF
- Founded: 1923
- Affiliation: World Athletics
- Regional affiliation: EAA
- Headquarters: Baku
- President: Çingiz Hüseynzadə
- Secretary: Firat Huseinov

Official website
- www.athletics.az
- (Azerbaijan)

The Azerbaijan Athletics Federation (Azerbaijani: Azərbaycan Atletika Federasiyası) is the governing body for the sport of athletics in Azerbaijan.

== Affiliations ==
- International Association of Athletics Federations (IAAF)
- European Athletic Association (EAA)
- Azerbaijan Olympic Committee

== Events ==
=== National ===
- Azerbaijan Athletics Championships
- Afgan Safarov Memorial - Since 1992

=== Balkan ===
- Balkan Athletics
- Balkan Athletics Championships
- Balkan Athletics Indoor Championships
- Balkan Athletics U20 Championships
- Balkan Masters Athletics Championships

=== Euro ===
- European Athletic Association
- European Athletics Championships
- European Athletics Indoor Championships
- European Athletics U23 Championships
- European Athletics U20 Championships
- European Athletics U18 Championships
- European Team Championships
- European Throwing Cup
- European Cross Country Championships
- European Masters Athletics Championships
- Athletics at the European Youth Summer Olympic Festival

=== World ===
- World Athletics
- World Athletics Championships
- World Athletics Indoor Championships
- World Athletics Cross Country Championships
- World Athletics U20 Championships
- IAAF World U18 Championships in Athletics
- World Masters Athletics Championships

=== Islamic ===
- Athletics at the Islamic Solidarity Games

== National records ==
The federation maintains the Azerbaijan records in athletics.
