= Khrystyna Yudkina =

Ukrainian racewalker

Personal information
- Nationality: Ukrainian
- Born: 4 December 1984 (age 40)

Sport
- Sport: Athletics
- Event: Race walking

Khrystyna Yudkina (born 4 December 1984) is a Ukrainian racewalking athlete. Representing Ukraine at the 2019 World Athletics Championships, she placed sixth in the women's 50 kilometres walk.
