= Azerbaijan at the 2010 European Athletics Championships =

Sporting event delegation

Azerbaijan was represented by 5 athletes at the 2010 European Athletics Championships held in Barcelona, Spain.

== Participants ==
=== Men ===
==== Track and field events ====
Athlete	Events	Heat		Final	
Athlete	Events	Result	Rank	Result	Rank
Hayle Ibrahimov	5000 m	13:32.98	1 Q	13.34.15	Bronze medal
Tilahun Aliyev	Marathon			Did not finish	

==== Field events ====
Event	Athletes	Qualification		Final	
Event	Athletes	Result	Rank	Result	Rank
Hammer throw	Dzmitry Marshyn	72.43	17	Did not advance	

=== Women ===
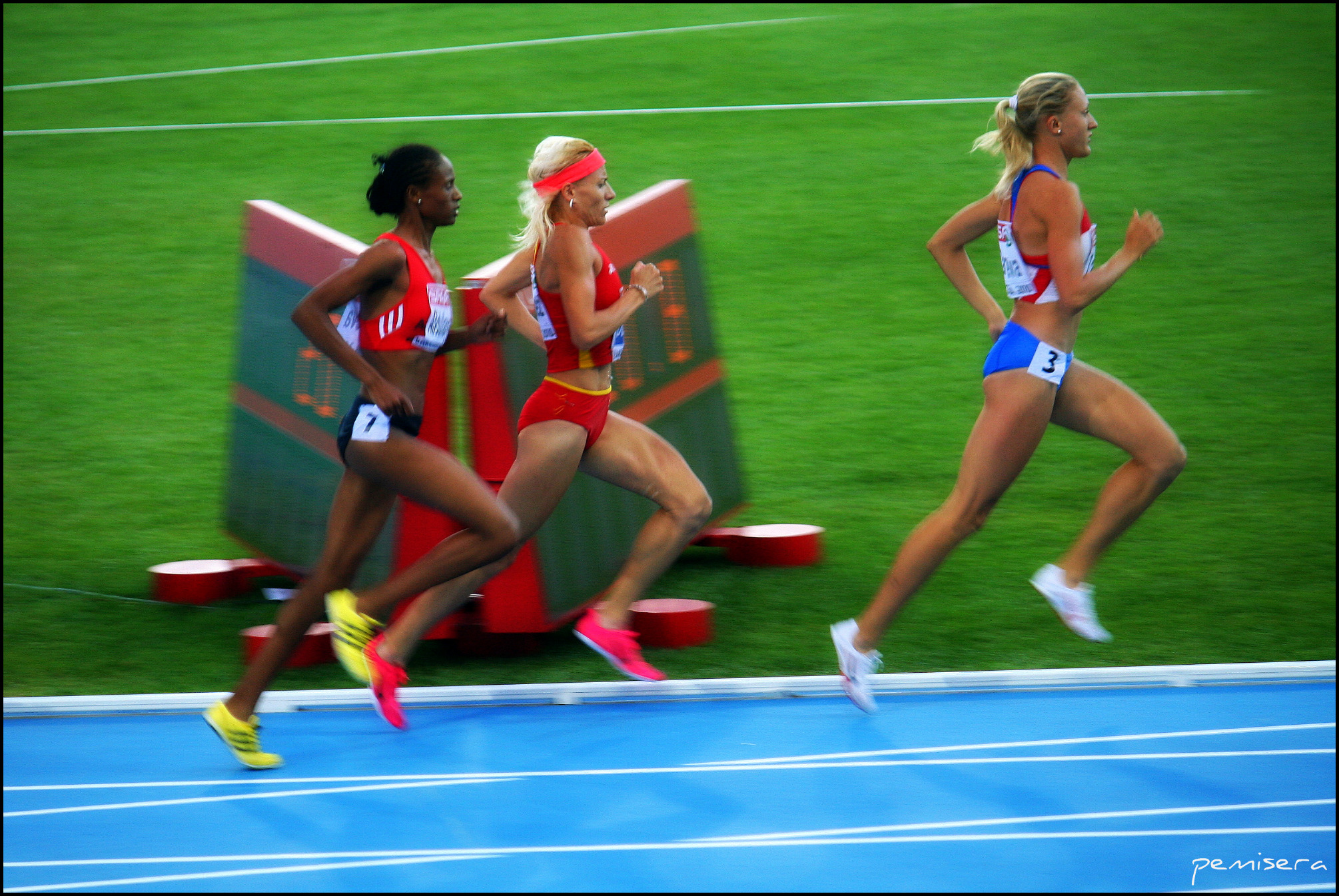
Layes Abdullayeva runs in third place. 3000 metres steeplechase. Final.

==== Track and road events ====
Athlete	Events	Heat		Final	
Athlete	Events	Result	Rank	Result	Rank
Layes Abdullayeva	3000 m steeplechase	9:40.42 (NR)	1 Q	9:34.75 (NR)	6
Gezashign Safarova	Marathon			2:51:59	32

== Results ==
2010 Barcelona	Gold	Silver	Bronze	Total
Azerbaijan (AZE)	0	0	1	1
