= Azerbaijan at the 2012 European Athletics Championships =

Azerbaijan competed at the 2012 European Athletics Championships held in Helsinki, Finland, between 27 June to 1 July 2012. 4 competitors, 3 men and 1 woman took part in 4 events.

== Results ==
=== Men ===
Track events

Event	Athletes	Heat		Semifinal		Final	
Event	Athletes	Result	Rank	Result	Rank	Result	Rank
100 m	Ruslan Abbasov	10.58	24 q	10.71	24	did not advance	
400 m	Hakim Ibrahimov	47.47	25	did not advance			
5000 m	Hayle Ibrahimov	—				13:36.05	6

=== Women ===
Track events

Event	Athletes	Heat		Semifinal		Final	
Event	Athletes	Result	Rank	Result	Rank	Result	Rank
5000 m	Layes Abdullayeva	—				15:33.88	14
