= France at the 2024 European Athletics Championships =

- Flag of France
- WA code: FRA

in Rome, Italy 7–12 June 2024
- Competitors: 104 (60 men and 44 women)
- Medals Ranked 2nd: Gold 4 Silver 5 Bronze 7 Total 16

European Athletics Championships appearances (overview)
- 1934; 1938; 1946; 1950; 1954; 1958; 1962; 1966; 1969; 1971; 1974; 1978; 1982; 1986; 1990; 1994; 1998; 2002; 2006; 2010; 2012; 2014; 2016; 2018; 2022; 2024; 2026

France competed at the 2024 European Athletics Championships in Rome, Italy from 7–12 June 2024.

== Medallists ==
Medal	Name	Event	Date
Gold	Cyréna Samba-Mayela	Women's 100 metres hurdles	8 June
Gold	Alice Finot	Women's 3000 metres steeplechase	9 June
Gold	Gabriel Tual	Men's 800 metres	9 June
Gold	Alexis Miellet	Men's 3000 metres steeplechase	10 June
Silver	Auriana Lazraq-Khlass	Women's heptathlon	8 June
Silver	Djilali Bedrani	Men's 3000 metres steeplechase	10 June
Silver	Louise Maraval	Women's 400 metres hurdles	11 June
Silver	Yann Schrub	Men's 10,000 metres	12 June
Silver	Orlann Oliere; Gémima Joseph; Helene Parisot; Sarah Richard; Maroussia Paré (heats)	Women's 4 × 100 metres relay	12 June
Bronze	Ilionis Guillaume	Women's triple jump	9 June
Bronze	Agathe Guillemot	Women's 1500 metres	9 June
Bronze	Rose Loga	Women's hammer throw	10 June
Bronze	Thomas Gogois	Men's triple jump	11 June
Bronze	Makenson Gletty	Men's decathlon	11 June
Bronze	Helene Parisot	Women's 200 metres	11 June
Bronze	Anaïs Bourgoin	Women's 800 metres	12 June

== Results ==
France entered the following athletes.

Key

- Q = Qualified for the next round
- q = Qualified for the next round as a fastest loser or, in field events, by position without achieving the qualifying target
- NR = National record
- PB = Personal best
- SB = Season best
- N/A = Round not applicable for the event

=== Men ===
Track and road events

Athlete	Event	Heat		Semifinal		Final	
Athlete	Event	Result	Rank	Result	Rank	Result	Rank
Pablo Mateo	100 metres	10.18	1 q	10.17 =SB	5 Q	10.22	8
Méba Mickaël Zeze	100 metres	DQ		Did not advance			
Pablo Mateo	200 metres	Bye		20.34	2 Q	DQ	
Ryan Zeze	200 metres	Bye		20.53	10	Did not advance	
Téo Andant	400 metres	45.65	8 q	45.72	17	Did not advance	
Gilles Biron	400 metres	Bye		45.91	18	Did not advance	
David Sombe	400 metres	45.45 SB	3 q	45.36 SB	10	Did not advance	
Paul Anselmini	800 metres	1:44.73 PB	1 Q	1:46.62	10	Did not advance	
Yanis Meziane	800 metres	1:46.39	16	Did not advance			
Gabriel Tual	800 metres	1:45.69	8 Q	1:45.03	1 Q	1:44.87	1st place, gold medalist(s)
Maël Gouyette	1500 metres	3:45.22	11	—N/a		Did not advance	
Azeddine Habz	1500 metres	3:38.87	3 Q	—N/a		3:33.70	7
Romain Mornet	1500 metres	3:44.28	5 Q	—N/a		3:34.33 SB	11
Bastien Augusto	5000 metres	—N/a				13:34.03	19
Etienne Daguinos	5000 metres	—N/a				13:30.06	15
Romain Legendre	5000 metres	—N/a				13:29.15	13
Simon Bedard	10,000 metres	—N/a				28:11.61	9
Valentin Gondouin	10,000 metres	—N/a				26:11.86	10
Jimmy Gressier	10,000 metres	—N/a				28:01.42 SB	5
Yann Schrub	10,000 metres	—N/a				28:00.48 SB	2nd place, silver medalist(s)
Loic Scomparin	10,000 metres	—N/a				DNF	
Felix Bour	Half marathon	—N/a				1:02:23 SB	16
Benjamin Choquert	Half marathon	—N/a				1:04:55	37
Nicolas Navarro	Half marathon	—N/a				1:06:02 SB	46
Emmanuel Roudolff	Half marathon	—N/a				1:04:30	33
Felix Bour; Benjamin Choquert; Nicolas Navarro; Emmanuel Roudolff	Half marathon team	—N/a				3:11:48	7
Romain Lecoeur	110 metres hurdles	13.75	9 q	13.47	9	Did not advance	
Raphaël Mohamed	110 metres hurdles	Bye		13.37	6 Q	13.45	4
Wilfried Happio	400 metres hurdles	Bye		48.55 SB	7	Did not advance	
Djilali Bedrani	3000 metres steeplechase	8:33.63	1 Q	—N/a		8:14.36	2nd place, silver medalist(s)
Nicolas-Marie Daru	3000 metres steeplechase	8:34.03	3 Q	—N/a		8:19.42	6
Alexis Miellet	3000 metres steeplechase	8:22.19	3 Q	—N/a		8:14.01 PB	1st place, gold medalist(s)
Gabriel Bordier	20 kilometres walk	—N/a				1:20:45	4
Kévin Campion	20 kilometres walk	—N/a				1:22:21 SB	11
Aurélien Quinion	20 kilometres walk	—N/a				1:22:38	12
Antoine Thoraval; Jeff Erius; Ryan Zeze; Aymeric Priam	4 × 100 metres relay	38.43	4 Q	—N/a		Withdrew	
Gilles Biron; Yann Spillmann; Muhammad Abdallah Kounta; Téo Andant; David Sombe (heats)	4 × 400 metres relay	3:00.77 SB	1 Q	—N/a		3:01.43	4

Field events

Athlete	Event	Qualification		Final	
Athlete	Event	Distance	Position	Distance	Position
Thibaut Collet	Pole vault	5.60	9 q	5.82	5
Robin Emig	Pole vault	5.60	6 q	5.65	11
Baptiste Thiery	Pole vault	5.60	12 q	5.75 =PB	9
Tom Campagne	Long jump	7.98	10 q	8.08 SB	5
Jules Pommery	Long jump	7.72	24	Did not advance	
Benjamin Compaoré	Triple jump	16.72 SB	9 Q	16.05	12
Thomas Gogois	Triple jump	16.75	6 Q	17.38 PB	3rd place, bronze medalist(s)
Jean-Marc Pontvianne	Triple jump	16.75	7 Q	17.04	6
Lolassonn Djouhan	Discus throw	60.80	19	Did not advance	
Tom Reux	Discus throw	59.03	25	Did not advance	
Teura'itera'i Tupaia	Javelin throw	81.46	10 q	82.98	5
Quentin Bigot	Hammer throw	75.29	9 q	73.81	9
Yann Chaussinand	Hammer throw	76.84	4 q	78.37	5

Combined events – Decathlon

Athlete	Event	100 m	LJ	SP	HJ	400 m	110H	DT	PV	JT	1500 m	Final	Rank
Téo Bastien	Result	10.91 SB	7.46	13.40	1.99	49.78	14.40 SB	43.55	4.90	55.17	5:06.59	7845	16
Téo Bastien	Points	881	925	692	794	825	924	737	880	665	522	7845	16
Makenson Gletty	Result	10.55 PB	7.59 PB	16.27	2.02 SB	47.60 PB	13.88 PB	43.54	4.90	57.47 SB	4:27.70 SB	8606 PB	3rd place, bronze medalist(s)
Makenson Gletty	Points	963	957	868	822	929	990	737	880	700	760	8606 PB	3rd place, bronze medalist(s)
Kevin Mayer	Result	10.72 SB	7.37	15.31	1.96 SB	49.73 SB	14.29 SB	48.53 SB	5.30 SB	69.54 SB	4:55.99 SB	8476 SB	5
Kevin Mayer	Points	924	903	809	797	827	937	840	1004	882	583	8476 SB	5

=== Women ===
Track and road events

Athlete	Event	Heat		Semifinal		Final	
Athlete	Event	Result	Rank	Result	Rank	Result	Rank
Gémima Joseph	100 metres	Bye		11.06	6 Q	11.08	6
Helene Parisot	200 metres	22.86 PB	2 q	22.73 PB	5 q	22.63 PB	3rd place, bronze medalist(s)
Amandine Brossier	400 metres	51.30 SB	1 q	51.78	12	Did not advance	
Anaïs Bourgoin	800 metres	2:02.55	18 Q	1:58.65 PB	2 Q	1:59.30	3rd place, bronze medalist(s)
Léna Kandissounon	800 metres	2:00.76 SB	6 Q	2:00.11 SB	7 Q	1:59.81 SB	4
Berenice Cleyet-Merle	1500 metres	DNF		—N/a		Did not advance	
Agathe Guillemot	1500 metres	4:11.92	1 Q	—N/a		4:05.69	3rd place, bronze medalist(s)
Sarah Madeleine	5000 metres	—N/a				15:02.56 PB	8
Mélody Julien	Half marathon	—N/a				1:11:49 SB	26
Fadouwa Ledhem	Half marathon	—N/a				1:14:07	47
Méline Rollin	Half marathon	—N/a				1:13:07 SB	39
Margaux Sieracki	Half marathon	—N/a				1:11:24	16
Mekdes Woldu	Half marathon	—N/a				1:10:04 SB	8
Mélody Julien; Fadouwa Ledhem; Méline Rollin; Margaux Sieracki; Mekdes Woldu	Half marathon team	—N/a				3:33:17	4
Laeticia Bapté	100 metres hurdles	Bye		12.95	13	Did not advance	
Cyréna Samba-Mayela	100 metres hurdles	Bye		12.43 EL	1 Q	12.31 CR	1st place, gold medalist(s)
Louise Maraval	400 metres hurdles	Bye		54.36 PB	2 Q	54.23 PB	2nd place, silver medalist(s)
Aude Clavier	3000 metres steeplechase	9:34.54	5 Q	—N/a		9:46.70	15
Alice Finot	3000 metres steeplechase	9:29.28 SB	1 Q	—N/a		9:16.22 EL	1st place, gold medalist(s)
Flavie Renouard	3000 metres steeplechase	9:59.29	12	—N/a		Did not advance	
Clémence Beretta	20 kilometres walk	—N/a				1:29:37	7
Camille Moutard	20 kilometres walk	—N/a				1:28:55 PB	5
Pauline Stey	20 kilometres walk	—N/a				1:29:54	8
Orlann Oliere; Gémima Joseph; Helene Parisot; Sarah Richard; Maroussia Paré (heats)	4 × 100 metres relay	42.35 SB	2 Q	—N/a		42.15 SB	2nd place, silver medalist(s)
Sounkamba Sylla; Louise Maraval; Alexe Deau; Amandine Brossier; Marjorie Veyssiere (heats)	4 × 400 metres relay	3:25.15 SB	2 Q	—N/a		3:23.77 SB	5

Field events

Athlete	Event	Qualification		Final	
Athlete	Event	Distance	Position	Distance	Position
Solène Gicquel	High jump	1.85	19	Did not advance	
Nawal Meniker	High jump	1.92 =SB	6 Q	1.90	6
Marie-Julie Bonnin	Pole vault	4.40	20	Did not advance	
Ninon Chapelle	Pole vault	4.50	11 q	4.43	9
Alix Dehaynain	Pole vault	4.50	11 q	4.43	9
Hilary Kpatcha	Long jump	6.82 SB	3 Q	6.88 PB	5
Ilionis Guillaume	Triple jump	14.00	8 q	14.43 PB	3rd place, bronze medalist(s)
Amanda Ngandu-Ntumba	Discus throw	57.07	16	Did not advance	
Melina Robert-Michon	Discus throw	61.90	6 q	61.65	7
Rose Loga	Hammer throw	71.70	3 Q	72.68 PB	3rd place, bronze medalist(s)
Alexandra Tavernier	Hammer throw	67.11	18	Did not advance	

Combined events – Heptathlon

Athlete	Event	100H	HJ	SP	200 m	LJ	JT	800 m	Final	Rank
Auriana Lazraq-Khlass	Result	13.35 PB	1.77 =PB	15.27 PB	23.56 PB	6.35 SB	48.23 PB	2:12.07 PB	6635 PB	2nd place, silver medalist(s)
Auriana Lazraq-Khlass	Points	1072	941	879	1023	959	826	935	6635 PB	2nd place, silver medalist(s)

=== Mixed ===
Track and road events

Athlete	Event	Final	
Athlete	Event	Result	Rank
Wilfried Happio; Sounkamba Sylla; Muhammad Abdallah Kounta; Louise Maraval	4 × 400 metres relay	DQ	
