= Germany at the 2024 European Athletics Championships =

- Flag of Germany
- WA code: GER
- National federation: German Athletics Association

in Rome, Italy 7−12 June 2022
- Competitors: 117 (62 men and 55 women)
- Medals Ranked 12th: Gold 1 Silver 3 Bronze 7 Total 11

European Athletics Championships appearances (overview)
- 1934; 1938; 1946–1950; 1954; 1958; 1962; 1966–1990; 1994; 1998; 2002; 2006; 2010; 2012; 2014; 2016; 2018; 2022; 2024

Germany competed at the 2024 European Athletics Championships in Rome, Italy from 7–12 June 2024.

== Medallists ==
Medal	Name	Event	Date
Gold	Malaika Mihambo	Women's long jump	12 June
Silver	Melat Yisak Kejeta; Fabienne Königstein; Domenika Meyer; Esther Pfeiffer; Alina Reh; Katharina Steinruck	Women's half marathon team	9 June
Silver	Julian Weber	Men's javelin throw	12 June
Silver	Gesa Felicitas Krause	Women's 3000 metres steeplechase	9 June
Bronze	Yemisi Ogunleye	Women's shot put	7 June
Bronze	Amanal Petros	Men's half marathon	9 June
Bronze	Filimon Abraham; Simon Boch; Samuel Fitwi Sibhatu; Amanal Petros; Hendrik Pfeiffer; Richard Ringer	Men's half marathon team	9 June
Bronze	Karl Bebendorf	Men's 3000 metres steeplechase	10 June
Bronze	Manuel Sanders; Jean Paul Bredau; Marc Koch; Emil Agyekum; Lukas Krappe (heats)	Men's 4 × 400 metres relay	12 June
Bronze	Kevin Kranz; Owen Ansah; Deniz Almas; Lucas Ansah-Peprah	Men's 4 × 100 metres relay	12 June
Bronze	Oleg Zernikel	Men's pole vault	12 June

== Results ==
Germany entered the following athletes.

Key

- Q = Qualified for the next round
- q = Qualified for the next round as a fastest loser or, in field events, by position without achieving the qualifying target
- NR = National record
- PB = Personal best
- SB = Season best
- N/A = Round not applicable for the event

=== Men ===
Track and road events

Athlete	Event	Heat		Semifinal		Final	
Athlete	Event	Result	Rank	Result	Rank	Result	Rank
Owen Ansah	100 metres	Bye		10.18	6 Q	10.17	5
Robin Ganter	100 metres	10.29	7 q	10.21	8 q	Withdrew	
Yannick Wolf	100 metres	Bye		10.32	14	Did not advance	
Joshua Hartmann	200 metres	Bye		20.38	3 Q	DQ	
Jean Paul Bredau	400 metres	Bye		45.03 SB	5 Q	45.11	7
Marc Koch	400 metres	46.18	17	Did not advance			
Manuel Sanders	400 metres	Bye		46.03	21	Did not advance	
Amos Bartelsmeyer	1500 metres	3:51.42	15	—N/a		Did not advance	
Robert Farken	1500 metres	3:42.26	11 qR	—N/a		3:33.98	8
Marius Probst	1500 metres	3:44.70	9	—N/a		Did not advance	
Mohamed Abdilaahi	5000 metres	—N/a				13:58.89	26
Florian Bremm	5000 metres	—N/a				13:42.30	23
Maximilian Thorwirth	5000 metres	—N/a				13:41.29	22
Davor Aaron Bienenfeld	10,000 metres	—N/a				28:18.19	15
Tom Förster	10,000 metres	—N/a				28:41.95	28
Nils Voigt	10,000 metres	—N/a				28:21.28	16
Filimon Abraham	Half marathon	—N/a				1:03:09 SB	22
Simon Boch	Half marathon	—N/a				1:04:16	31
Samuel Fitwi Sibhatu	Half marathon	—N/a				1:01:17 PB	5
Amanal Petros	Half marathon	—N/a				1:01:07	3rd place, bronze medalist(s)
Hendrik Pfeiffer	Half marathon	—N/a				1:04:32	34
Richard Ringer	Half marathon	—N/a				1:03:53 SB	28
Filimon Abraham; Simon Boch; Samuel Fitwi Sibhatu; Amanal Petros; Hendrik Pfeiffer; Richard Ringer	Half marathon team	—N/a				3:05:33	3rd place, bronze medalist(s)
Tim Eikermann	110 metres hurdles	13.69	5 q	13.62	12	Did not advance	
Manuel Mordi	110 metres hurdles	13.78	10 q	13.70	15	Did not advance	
Joshua Abuaku	400 metres hurdles	Bye		49.13	10	Did not advance	
Emil Agyekum	400 metres hurdles	Bye		48.36 PB	4 q	48.42	6
Constantin Preis	400 metres hurdles	Bye		49.68	17	Did not advance	
Karl Bebendorf	3000 metres steeplechase	8:34.11	5 Q	—N/a		8:14.41 PB	3rd place, bronze medalist(s)
Frederik Ruppert	3000 metres steeplechase	8:21.49	2 Q	—N/a		8:15.08 PB	4
Velten Schneider	3000 metres steeplechase	8:34.00	2 Q	—N/a		8:38.73	16
Leo Köpp	20 kilometres walk	—N/a				1:21:19	8
Christopher Linke	20 kilometres walk	—N/a				DNF	
Nathaniel Seiler	20 kilometres walk	—N/a				1:27:42	25
Kevin Kranz; Owen Ansah; Deniz Almas; Lucas Ansah-Peprah	4 × 100 metres relay	38.43 SB	3 Q	—N/a		38.52	3rd place, bronze medalist(s)
Manuel Sanders; Jean Paul Bredau; Marc Koch; Emil Agyekum; Lukas Krappe (heats)	4 × 400 metres relay	3:01.44	3 Q	—N/a		3:00.82 SB	3rd place, bronze medalist(s)

Field events

Athlete	Event	Qualification		Final	
Athlete	Event	Distance	Position	Distance	Position
Mateusz Przybylko	High jump	2.21	12 q	2.17	12
Jonas Wagner	High jump	DNS			
Torben Blech	Pole vault	5.60	1 q	5.75	6
Bo Kanda Lita Baehre	Pole vault	5.45	14	Did not advance	
Oleg Zernikel	Pole vault	5.60	1 q	5.82 SB	3rd place, bronze medalist(s)
Simon Batz	Long jump	8.03	8 Q	7.65	9
Maximilian Entholzner	Long jump	7.89	16	Did not advance	
Luka Herden	Long jump	8.08 SB	6 Q	8.01	8
Max Heß	Triple jump	16.83	4 Q	17.04 SB	5
Silas Ristl	Shot put	19.64	13	Did not advance	
Henrik Janssen	Discus throw	64.74	3 q	65.48	5
Clemens Prüfer	Discus throw	63.57	7 q	64.60	6
Mika Sosna	Discus throw	62.07	12 q	59.61	12
Max Dehning	Javelin throw	80.52	12 q	76.16	12
Julian Weber	Javelin throw	85.01	1 Q	85.94	2nd place, silver medalist(s)
Merlin Hummel	Hammer throw	75.73	6 q	79.25 EU23L	4
Sören Klose	Hammer throw	72.96	19	Did not advance	

Combined events – Decathlon

Athlete	Event	100 m	LJ	SP	HJ	400 m	110H	DT	PV	JT	1500 m	Final	Rank
Manuel Eitel	Result	10.58 SB	7.28 SB	15.25 SB	1.96 SB	49.02 SB	14.49 SB	43.98	5.00 PB	57.02 SB	4:39.66 SB	8212	7
Manuel Eitel	Points	956	881	805	767	860	912	746	910	693	682	8212	7
Niklas Kaul	Result	11.34 SB	7.44 PB	15.10 SB	1.96 SB	48.81 SB	14.91	49.89 PB	4.90 SB	75.45 SB	4:17.77 SB	8547	4
Niklas Kaul	Points	786	920	796	767	870	860	868	880	973	827	8547	4
Tim Nowak	Result	11.30	7.48	14.12	2.02	50.23	14.67	42.25	4.90	62.64 SB	4:21.02	8150	9
Tim Nowak	Points	795	930	736	822	804	890	710	880	778	805	8150	9
Felix Wolter	Result	10.76	7.67	13.11	1.96	47.65 SB	14.41	45.40 PB	4.60	53.65	4:42.90	8051	13
Felix Wolter	Points	915	977	674	767	926	922	775	790	643	662	8051	13

=== Women ===
Track and road events

Athlete	Event	Heat		Semifinal		Final	
Athlete	Event	Result	Rank	Result	Rank	Result	Rank
Rebekka Haase	100 metres	Bye		11.35	19	Did not advance	
Gina Lückenkemper	100 metres	Bye		11.06 =SB	5 Q	11.07	5
Lisa Mayer	100 metres	11.20	2 q	Withdrew			
Jennifer Montag	100 metres	11.31 SB	8 q	Withdrew			
Talea Prepens	200 metres	22.83 PB	1 q	22.99	12	Did not advance	
Jessica-Bianca Wessolly	200 metres	23.00 SB	5 q	23.27	18	Did not advance	
Majtie Kolberg	800 metres	2:00.23 SB	1 Q	1:58.74 PB	3 Q	1:59.87	5
Nele Weßel	1500 metres	4:16.54	13 qR	—N/a		4:07.76	11
Hanna Klein	5000 metres	—N/a				14:58.28 SB	6
Eva Dieterich	10,000 metres	—N/a				33:17.78	19
Lisa Merkel	10,000 metres	—N/a				32:17.24	9
Deborah Schöneborn	10,000 metres	—N/a				33:48.90 SB	23
Melat Yisak Kejeta	Half marathon	—N/a				1:09:42	5
Fabienne Königstein	Half marathon	—N/a				1:11:34	20
Domenika Meyer	Half marathon	—N/a				1:10:49	11
Esther Pfeiffer	Half marathon	—N/a				1:11:28	18
Katharina Steinruck	Half marathon	—N/a				1:12:48	37
Melat Yisak Kejeta; Fabienne Königstein; Domenika Meyer; Esther Pfeiffer; Alina Reh; Katharina Steinruck	Half marathon team	—N/a				3:31:59	2nd place, silver medalist(s)
Marlene Meier	100 metres hurdles	13.25	13	Did not advance			
Rosina Schneider	100 metres hurdles	13.10	7 q	13.41	24	Did not advance	
Eileen Demes	400 metres hurdles	55.25 PB	2 q	55.64	18	Did not advance	
Olivia Gürth	3000 metres steeplechase	9:34.69	7 Q	—N/a		9:31.98	11
Gesa Felicitas Krause	3000 metres steeplechase	9:31.52	3 Q	—N/a		9:18.06	2nd place, silver medalist(s)
Lea Meyer	3000 metres steeplechase	9:30.63	2 Q	—N/a		9:27.85	9
Saskia Feige	20 kilometres walk	—N/a				1:33:57 SB	18
Sophia Junk; Nele Jaworski; Gina Lückenkemper; Rebekka Haase	4 × 100 metres relay	42.47 SB	4 Q	—N/a		42.61	4
Skadi Schier; Alica Schmidt; Luna Bulmahn; Eileen Demes	4 × 400 metres relay	3:25.90 SB	7 Q	—N/a		3:27.11	8

Field events

Athlete	Event	Qualification		Final	
Athlete	Event	Distance	Position	Distance	Position
Christina Honsel	High jump	1.92	1 Q	1.86	11
Imke Onnen	High jump	1.89	8 q	1.90	8
Anjuli Knäsche	Pole vault	4.50	1 q	4.43	11
Jacqueline Otchere	Pole vault	4.40	18	Did not advance	
Mikaelle Assani	Long jump	6.67	9 q	6.91 =PB	4
Malaika Mihambo	Long jump	7.03 EL	1 Q	7.22 WL	1st place, gold medalist(s)
Laura Raquel Müller	Long jump	6.43	22	Did not advance	
Kristin Gierisch	Triple jump	13.91 SB	11 q	13.74	10
Alina Kenzel	Shot put	18.42	2 Q	18.55	4
Yemisi Ogunleye	Shot put	18.40	3 Q	18.62	3rd place, bronze medalist(s)
Julia Ritter	Shot put	18.06	8 Q	18.18	7
Shanice Craft	Discus throw	62.44	5 q	61.73	6
Marike Steinacker	Discus throw	63.30	4 Q	59.72	12
Claudine Vita	Discus throw	60.96	9 q	62.65	5
Christin Hussong	Javelin throw	58.21	9 q	61.92 SB	4
Jana Marie Lowka	Javelin throw	52.54	26	Did not advance	
Samantha Borutta	Hammer throw	68.00	16	Did not advance	

Combined events – Heptathlon

Athlete	Event	100H	HJ	SP	200 m	LJ	JT	800 m	Final	Rank
Vanessa Grimm	Result	14.09	1.71	13.59	24.94	6.13	45.56 SB	2:15.94	6036	11
Vanessa Grimm	Points	966	867	767	892	890	774	880	6036	11
Carolin Schäfer	Result	13.39 SB	1.71 SB	NM	DNF					
Carolin Schäfer	Points	1066	867	0	DNF					
Sophie Weißenberg	Result	13.58 SB	1.71	13.84 SB	23.53	6.41 SB	DNF			
Sophie Weißenberg	Points	1039	867	783	1026	978	DNF			
