= 2024 European Athletics Championships – Women's 4 × 400 metres relay =

Women's 4 × 400 metres relay at the 2024 European Athletics Championships
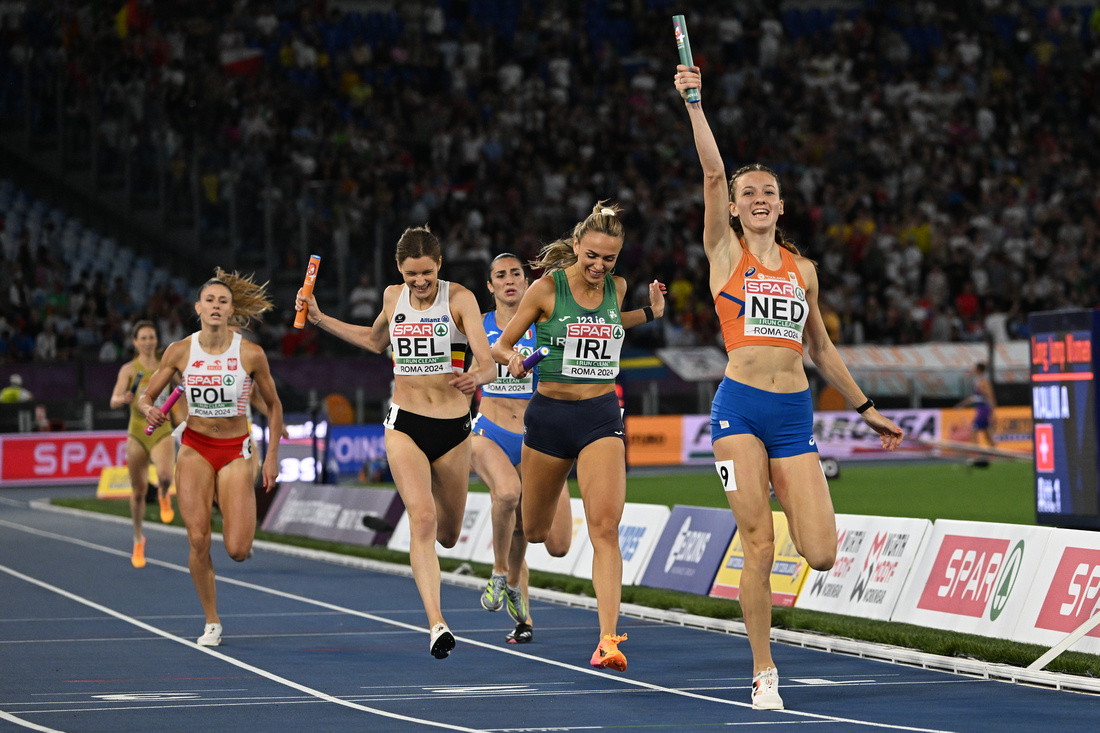
- Medalists Femke Bol, Sharlene Mawdsley, and Helena Ponette at the finish of the final on 12 June 2024
- Venue: Stadio Olimpico
- Location: Rome, Italy
- Dates: 11 June 2024 (round 1); 12 June 2024 (final)
- Teams: 16 nations
- Winning time: 3:22.39 min

Medalists
gold medal	Lieke Klaver; Cathelijn Peeters; Lisanne de Witte; Femke Bol; Eveline Saalberg (Note: This athlete competed in round 1, but was replaced in the final.); Anne van de Wiel; Myrte van der Schoot	Netherlands
silver medal	Sophie Becker; Rhasidat Adeleke; Phil Healy; Sharlene Mawdsley; Lauren Cadden	Ireland
bronze medal	Naomi Van den Broeck; Imke Vervaet; Cynthia Bolingo; Helena Ponette; Camille Laus	Belgium

The women's 4 × 400 metres relay at the 2024 European Athletics Championships was held over two rounds at the Stadio Olimpico in Rome, Italy, on 11 and 12 June 2024. It was the eighteenth time the event was contested at the European Athletics Championships. Relay teams of sixteen nations competed.

The two heats of round 1 were held on 11 June. The fastest three teams in each heat and the two fastest of the rest qualified for the final. The team of Spain advanced with a national record of 3:25.25 minutes. Also setting national records but not making the final were the Swedish team who finished in 3:26.05 min and the Norwegian team who finished in 3:29.84 min. The team of the Czech Republic was disqualified after dropping the baton.

The final was held on 12 June. The race was won by the team of the Netherlands in 3:22.39 min, followed by the team of Ireland in a national record of 3:25.25 min, and then the team of Belgium in 3:22.95 min. Outside the medals, the Italian team set a national record of 3:23.40 min.

== Background ==
The women's 4 × 400 metres relay was introduced at the 1969 European Athletics Championships and had been contested seventeen times before 2024, whereas the men's 4 × 400 metres relay had already been around since the 1934 European Athletics Championships. The 2024 edition was held at the 400-metre track inside the Olympic Stadium in Rome, Italy, where the 1974 edition had also taken place.

Before the Championships, the world and European record was 3:15.17 min, set by the Soviet team in 1988, and the championship record was 3:16.87 min, set by the East German team in 1986. The world leading time was 3:21.70 min, set by the team of the United States on 5 May 2024, and the European leading time was 3:24.38 min, set by the team of Ireland on 4 May 2024, both during the 2024 World Athletics Relays in Nassau, Bahamas. The defending champion was the team of the Netherlands, who had won the 2022 title in this event.

Records before the 2024 European Athletics Championships
Record	Nation (athletes)	Time	Location	Date
World record	Soviet Union (Tatyana Ledovskaya, Olga Nazarova, Mariya Pinigina, Olga Bryzgina)	3:15.17	Seoul, South Korea	1 October 1988
European record	Soviet Union (Tatyana Ledovskaya, Olga Nazarova, Mariya Pinigina, Olga Bryzgina)	3:15.17	Seoul, South Korea	1 October 1988
Championship record	East Germany (Kirsten Emmelmann, Sabine Busch, Petra Müller, Marita Koch)	3:16.87	Stuttgart, West Germany	31 August 1986
World Leading	United States (Quanera Hayes, Gabrielle Thomas, Bailey Lear, Alexis Holmes)	3:21.70	Nassau, Bahamas	5 May 2024
Europe Leading	Ireland (Sophie Becker, Rhasidat Adeleke, Phil Healy, Sharlene Mawsdley)	3:24.38	Nassau, Bahamas	4 May 2024

== Qualification ==
Sixteen national teams could qualify for the women's 4 × 400 metres relay. The Italian team qualified automatically, because Italy was the host nation. The other fifteen teams qualified by their ranking based on the aggregate of their two fastest times during the qualification period from 1 January 2023 to 26 May 2024.

== Rounds ==
=== Round 1 ===
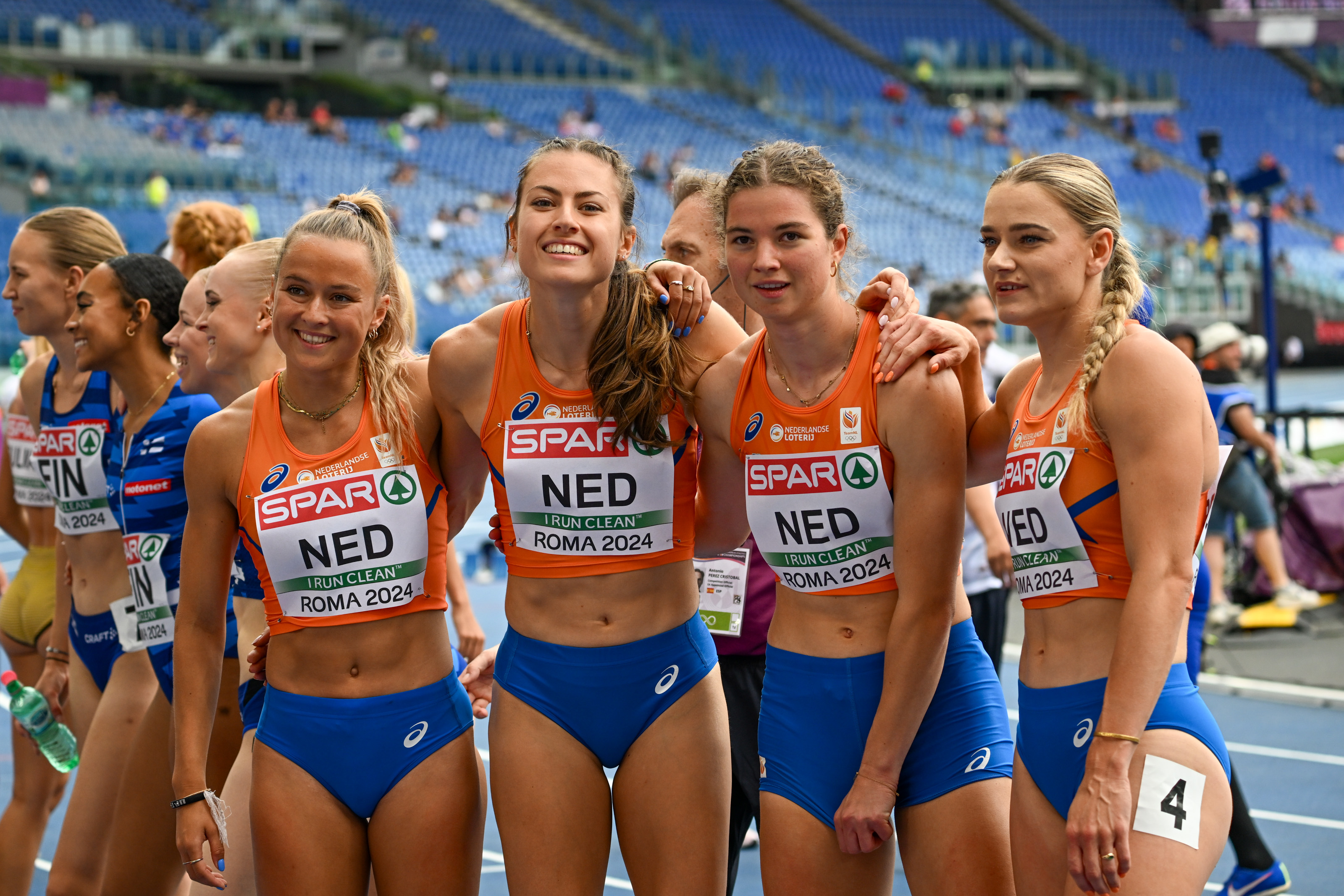
Anne van de Wiel, Eveline Saalberg, Myrte van der Schoot, and Lisanne de Witte of the Netherlands after the first heat of round 1; all but De Witte were replaced in the final.

The two heats of round 1 were held on 11 June, starting at 11:15 (UTC+2) in the morning. The first three teams in each heat (Q) and the next two fastest teams (q) qualified for the final. In the first heat, the teams of Poland, Germany, and the Netherlands directly qualified for the final, the team of Norway set a national record (NR) of 3:29.84 min, and the team of the Czech Republic was disqualified (DQ) for a fault with the recovery of a dropped baton (TR24.6). In the second heat, the teams of Ireland, France, and Belgium directly qualified for the final, the Spanish team set a national record (NR) of 3:25.25 min qualifying as next fastest together with the Italian team, and the Swedish team set a national record (NR) of 3:26.05 min.

Results of round 1
Rank	Heat	Lane	Nation	Athletes	Time	Notes
1	2	6	Ireland	Sophie Becker, Phil Healy, Lauren Cadden, Sharlene Mawdsley	3:24.81	Q
2	2	4	France	Sounkamba Sylla, Alexe Deau, Marjorie Veyssiere, Amandine Brossier	3:25.15	Q, SB
3	2	9	Belgium	Naomi Van den Broeck, Imke Vervaet, Cynthia Bolingo, Camille Laus	3:25.16	Q, SB
4	2	8	Spain	Carmen Avilés, Berta Segura, Eva Santidrián, Blanca Hervas	3:25.25	q, NR
5	2	7	Italy	Ilaria Elvira Accame, Giancarla Trevisan, Rebecca Borga, Anna Polinari	3:25.28	q, SB
6	1	6	Poland	Kinga Gacka, Marika Popowicz-Drapała, Iga Baumgart-Witan, Justyna Święty-Ersetic	3:25.59	Q
7	1	8	Germany	Skadi Schier, Alica Schmidt, Luna Bulmahn, Eileen Demes	3:25.90	Q, SB
8	1	4	Netherlands	Eveline Saalberg, Anne van de Wiel, Myrte van der Schoot, Lisanne de Witte	3:25.99	Q
9	1	2	Norway	Josefine Tomine Eriksen, Astri Ertzgaard, Elisabeth Slettum, Amalie Iuel	3:26.05	NR
10	1	7	Finland	Milja Thureson, Aino Pulkkinen, Katriina Wright, Mette Baas	3:26.51	SB
11	2	3	Switzerland	Lena Wernli, Julia Niederberger, Annina Fahr, Yasmin Giger	3:27.48	SB
12	2	5	Ukraine	Maryana Shostak, Kateryna Karpiuk, Tetiana Kharashcuk, Anna Ryzhykova	3:27.69	SB
13	1	9	Portugal	Carina Vanessa, Cátia Azevedo, Sofia Lavreshina, Vera Barbosa	3:29.50	SB
14	1	3	Sweden	Lisa Lilja, Moa Granat, Jonna Claesson, Marie Kimumba	3:29.84	NR
15	2	2	Hungary	Sarolta Kriszt, Sára Mátó, Bianka Kéri, Virág Simon	3:31.28	SB
	1	5	Czech Republic	Marcela Pírková, Tereza Petržilková, Barbora Veselá, Barbora Malíková	DQ	TR24.6

=== Final ===
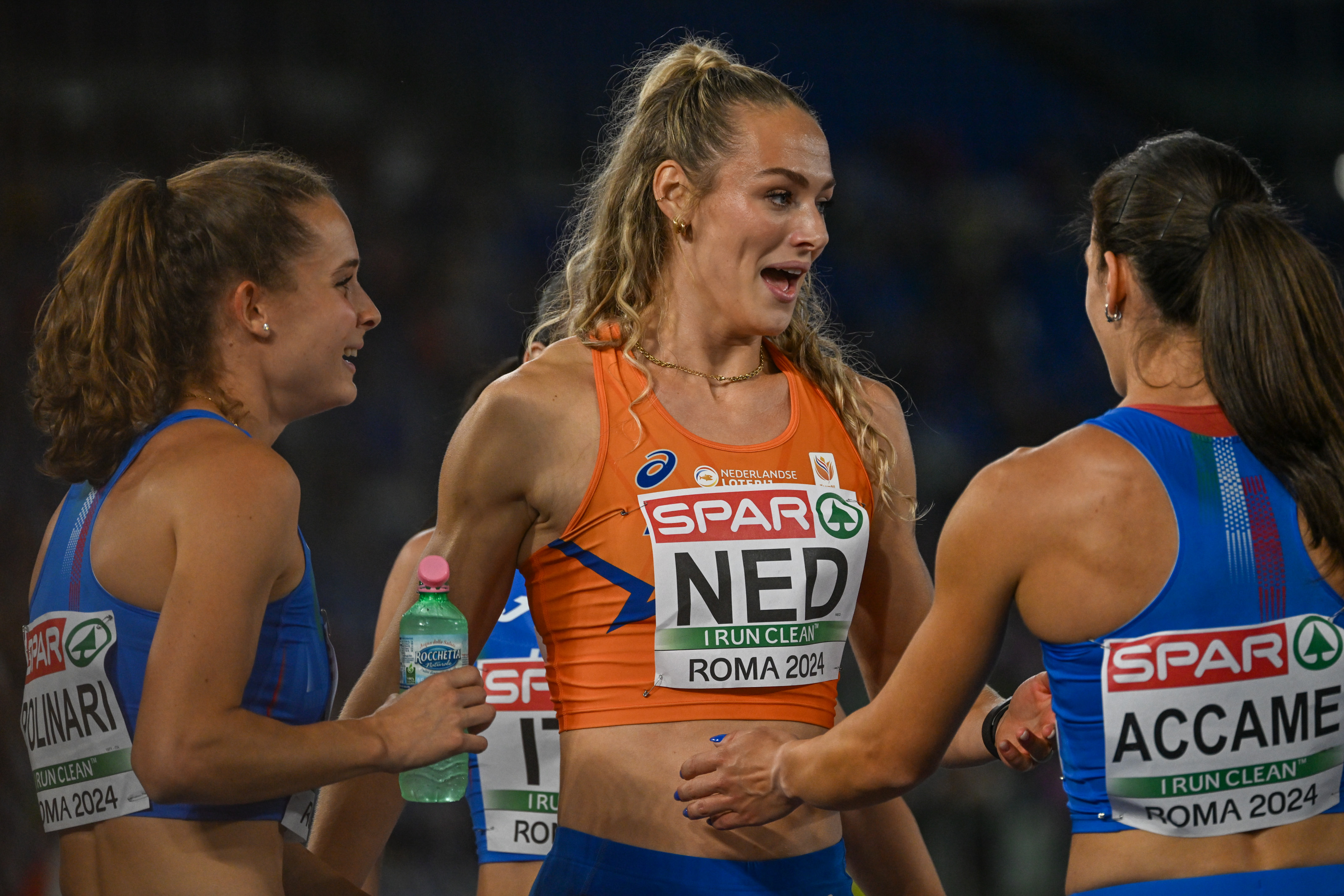
Anna Polinari of Italy, Lieke Klaver of the Netherlands, and Ilaria Elvira Accame of Italy after the final race

The final was held on 12 June, starting at 21:05 (UTC+2) in the evening. Lieke Klaver was the first leg runner for the Netherlands and the first to hand over the baton after one round, followed by Sophie Becker of Ireland, Kinga Gacka of Poland, and Naomi Van den Broeck of Belgium. In the second leg, Cathelijn Peeters of the Netherlands was passed by Rhasidat Adeleke of Ireland, while Marika Popowicz-Drapała of Poland was passed by Imke Vervaet of Belgium. In the third leg, Phil Healy of Ireland started in the lead. Lisanne de Witte of the Netherlands held off Cynthia Bolingo of Belgium and was able to pass Healy shortly before the final handover. In the anchor leg, Femke Bol was in the lead from handover to finish, and Sharlene Mawdsley of Ireland and Helena Ponette of Belgium maintained their relative positions. The Dutch team finished first in a European leading time (EL) of 3:22.39 min, successfully defending their 2022 title, followed by the Irish team in second place with a national record (NR) of 3:22.71 min, and then the Belgian team finished in third place in 3:22.95 min. In fourth place, the Italian team set a new national record (NR) of 3:23.40 min.

Ian O'Riordan wrote about the race for The Irish Times: "After a thrilling final showdown, it was the star-loaded and formidable Dutch team, with the untouchable Bol running their anchor leg, who took gold". It was the first women's team to successfully defend the 4 × 400 m title since the German team in 2002. Bol called the successful defense "super super super cool" in an interview. Klaver said: "This was a very nice race. We are favorites, so there was some pressure, but that is pleasant pressure." Adeleke said after the race: "To get an individual medal was one thing. But one thing I really wanted was the two relay medals. I just feel like we've deserved it so much, to go out there with the girls, and the guys earlier, and win a medal with the team." And Ponette said in an interview: "It's unbelievable. It's an achievement that we've dreamed of for years and have long said we could achieve, but we never really did. And now it's finally the day we succeeded. So, we are very proud of our team and all the work we've done for it, which is now finally being rewarded with a medal."

Results of the final
Rank	Lane	Nation	Athletes	Time	Notes
1st place, gold medalist(s)	9	Netherlands	Lieke Klaver, Cathelijn Peeters, Lisanne de Witte, Femke Bol	3:22.39	EL
2nd place, silver medalist(s)	6	Ireland	Sophie Becker, Rhasidat Adeleke, Phil Healy, Sharlene Mawdsley	3:22.71	NR
3rd place, bronze medalist(s)	4	Belgium	Naomi Van den Broeck, Imke Vervaet, Cynthia Bolingo, Helena Ponette	3:22.95	SB
4	3	Italy	Ilaria Elvira Accame, Giancarla Trevisan, Anna Polinari, Alice Mangione	3:23.40	NR
5	7	France	Sounkamba Sylla, Louise Maraval, Alexe Deau, Amandine Brossier	3:23.77	SB
6	8	Poland	Kinga Gacka, Marika Popowicz-Drapała, Iga Baumgart-Witan, Natalia Kaczmarek	3:23.91	SB
7	2	Spain	Carmen Avilés, Berta Segura, Eva Santidrián, Blanca Hervas	3:26.94	
8	5	Germany	Skadi Schier, Alica Schmidt, Luna Bulmahn, Eileen Demes	3:27.11	
