= Ukraine at the 2024 European Athletics Championships =

- Flag of Ukraine
- WA code: UKR

in Rome, Italy 7 June 2024 – 12 June 2024
- Competitors: 44 (17 men and 27 women)
- Medals Ranked 14th: Gold 1 Silver 1 Bronze 14 Total 16

European Athletics Championships appearances
- 1994; 1998; 2002; 2006; 2010; 2012; 2014; 2016; 2018; 2022; 2024; 2026

Other related appearances
- Soviet Union (1946–1990)

Ukraine competed at the 2024 European Athletics Championships in Rome, Italy from 7–12 June 2024.

== Medallists ==
Medal	Name	Event	Date
Gold	Yaroslava Mahuchikh	Women's high jump	9 June
Silver	Vladyslav Lavskyy	Men's high jump	11 June
Bronze	Lyudmila Olyanovska	Women's 20 kilometres walk	7 June
Bronze	Iryna Herashchenko	Women's high jump	9 June
Bronze	Mykhaylo Kokhan	Men's hammer throw	9 June
Bronze	Oleh Doroshchuk	Men's high jump	11 June

== Results ==
Ukraine entered the following athletes.

Key

- Q = Qualified for the next round
- q = Qualified for the next round as a fastest loser or, in field events, by position without achieving the qualifying target
- NR = National record
- PB = Personal best
- SB = Season best
- N/A = Round not applicable for the event

=== Men ===
Track and road events

Athlete	Event	Heat		Semifinal		Final	
Athlete	Event	Result	Rank	Result	Rank	Result	Rank
Oleksandr Pohorilko	400 metres	Bye		45.41	12	Did not advance	
Ivan Banzeruk	20 kilometres walk	—N/a				1:28:25 SB	26
Ihor Hlavan	20 kilometres walk	—N/a				1:22:03	10
Serhii Svitlychnyi	20 kilometres walk	—N/a				1:23:49 SB	17
Oleksandr Pohorilko; Rostyslav Holubovych; Mykyta Rodchenkov; Danylo Danylenko	4 × 400 metres relay	3:05.86 SB	11	—N/a		Did not advance	

Field events

Athlete	Event	Qualification		Final	
Athlete	Event	Distance	Position	Distance	Position
Oleh Doroshchuk	High jump	2.21	1 q	2.26	3rd place, bronze medalist(s)
Vladyslav Lavskyy	High jump	2.21	10 q	2.29 =PB	2nd place, silver medalist(s)
Dmytro Nikitin	High jump	2.17	14	Did not advance	
Illia Kravchenko	Pole vault	5.25	24	Did not advance	
Vladislav Malykhin	Pole vault	5.45	19	Did not advance	
Artem Konovalenko	Triple jump	15.94 =SB	22	Did not advance	
Vladyslav Shepeliev	Triple jump	16.17	17	Did not advance	
Roman Kokoshko	Shot put	19.41	16	Did not advance	
Mykhaylo Kokhan	Hammer throw	77.77	3 Q	80.18	3rd place, bronze medalist(s)
Artur Felfner	Javelin throw	81.74	8 q	81.38	8

=== Women ===
Track and road events

Athlete	Event	Heat		Semifinal		Final	
Athlete	Event	Result	Rank	Result	Rank	Result	Rank
Tetiana Kaysen	200 metres	24.31	23	Did not advance			
Kateryna Karpiuk	400 metres	53.06	19	Did not advance			
Tetyana Melnyk	400 metres	54.06	20	Did not advance			
Maryana Shostak	400 metres	52.07 PB	8 q	51.99 PB	13	Did not advance	
Nataliya Krol	800 metres	2:02.87	24	Did not advance			
Olha Lyakhova	800 metres	2:01.51	13	Did not advance			
Viktoriia Kaliuzhna	Half marathon	—N/a				1:13:25	41
Olga Nyzhnyk	Half marathon	—N/a				1:14:23 SB	50
Hanna Plotitsyna	100 metres hurdles	13.35	16	Did not advance			
Mariya Buryak	400 metres hurdles	58.40	22	Did not advance			
Anna Ryzhykova	400 metres hurdles	Bye		54.95 SB	12	Did not advance	
Nataliya Strebkova	3000 metres steeplechase	9:45.71	23	—N/a		Did not advance	
Lyudmyla Olyanovska	20 kilometres walk	—N/a				1:28:48 SB	3rd place, bronze medalist(s)
Mariia Sakharuk	20 kilometres walk	—N/a				1:32:39	13
Olena Sobchuk	20 kilometres walk	—N/a				1:31:47 SB	10
Maryana Shostak; Kateryna Karpiuk; Tetiana Kharashcuk; Anna Ryzhykova	4 × 400 metres relay	3:27.69 SB	12	—N/a		Did not advance	

Field events

Athlete	Event	Qualification		Final	
Athlete	Event	Distance	Position	Distance	Position
Yuliya Chumachenko	High jump	1.85	25	Did not advance	
Iryna Herashchenko	High jump	1.92	4 q	1.95 =SB	3rd place, bronze medalist(s)
Yuliya Levchenko	High jump	1.81	23	Did not advance	
Yaroslava Mahuchikh	High jump	1.92	1 q	2.01	1st place, gold medalist(s)
Yana Hladiychuk	Pole vault	4.10	24	Did not advance	
Oksana Mahlolovets	Long jump	6.39	24	Did not advance	
Olha Korsun	Triple jump	13.99	9 q	13.69	12
Anna Krasutska	Triple jump	14.00	7 q	13.71	11
Mariya Siney	Triple jump	NM		Did not advance	
Iryna Klymets	Hammer throw	66.11	24	Did not advance	

Combined events – Heptathlon

Athlete	Event	100H	HJ	SP	200 m	LJ	JT	800 m	Final	Rank
Yuliya Loban	Result	13.96 SB	1.71	13.05	DNS	DNF				
Yuliya Loban	Points	984	867	731	0	DNF				
