= Switzerland at the 2024 European Athletics Championships =

- Flag of Switzerland
- WA code: SUI
- National federation: Swiss Athletics Federation

in Rome, Italy 4−7 June 2024
- Competitors: 60 (29 men and 31 women) in 30 events
- Medals Ranked 5th: Gold 4 Silver 1 Bronze 4 Total 9

European Athletics Championships appearances
- 1934; 1938; 1946; 1950; 1954; 1958; 1962; 1966; 1969; 1971; 1974; 1978; 1982; 1986; 1990; 1994; 1998; 2002; 2006; 2010; 2012; 2014; 2016; 2018; 2022; 2024

Switzerland will compete at the 2024 European Athletics Championships in Rome, Italy, between 7 and 12 June 2024.

== Medallists ==
Medal	Name	Event	Date
Gold	Dominic Lobalu	Men's 10,000 metres	12 June
Gold	Mujinga Kambundji	Women's 200 metres	11 June
Gold	Angelica Moser	Women's pole vault	10 June
Gold	Timothé Mumenthaler	Men's 200 metres	10 June
Silver	Ditaji Kambundji	Women's 100 metres hurdles	8 June
Bronze	William Reais	Men's 200 metres	10 June
Bronze	Simon Ehammer	Men's long jump	8 June
Bronze	Jason Joseph	Men's 110 metres hurdles	8 June
Bronze	Dominic Lobalu	Men's 5000 metres	8 June

== Results ==
Switzerland entered the following athletes.

Key

- Q = Qualified for the next round
- q = Qualified for the next round as a fastest loser or, in field events, by position without achieving the qualifying target
- Bye = Athlete not required to compete in round
- EU23R=European Under 23 Record
- NR = National record
- PB = Personal best
- SB = Season best
- N/A = Round not applicable for the event
- DNF = Did not finish
- DNS = Did not start
- NM = No valid trial recorded

=== Men ===
Track and road events

Athlete	Event	Heat		Semifinal		Final	
Athlete	Event	Result	Rank	Result	Rank	Result	Rank
William Reais	100 m	10.35 SB	12 q	10.32	13	did not advance	
William Reais	200 m	Bye		20.51	7 q	20.47	3rd place, bronze medalist(s)
Timothé Mumenthaler	200 m	Bye		20.38	4 Q	20.28	1st place, gold medalist(s)
Felix Svensson	200 m	20.52	1 q	20.66	11	did not advance	
Lionel Spitz	400 m	45.37 SB	2 q	45.28 SB	8 q	45.69	8
Ricky Petrucciani	400 m	45.90 SB	14 q	45.47 SB	14	did not advance	
Ramon Wipfli	800 m	1:47.37	27	did not advance			
Tom Elmer	1500 m	3:45.91	25	—N/a		did not advance	
Dominic Lobalu	5000 m	—N/a				13:21.61	3rd place, bronze medalist(s)
Jonas Raess	5000 m	—N/a				13:31.43	16
Morgan Le Guen	5000 m	—N/a				13:25.08	8
Dominic Lobalu	10,000 m	—N/a				28:00.32	1st place, gold medalist(s)
Jonas Raess	10,000 m	—N/a				28:17.79	13
Tadesse Abraham	Half Marathon	—N/a				1:04:53	36
Matthias Kyburz	Half Marathon	—N/a				1:03:07	21
Patrik Wägeli	Half Marathon	—N/a				1:06:03 SB	47
Julien Wanders	Half Marathon	—N/a				DNF	
Tadesse Abraham; Matthias Kyburz; Patrik Wägeli; Julien Wanders	Half marathon team	—N/a				3:14:03	8
Jason Joseph	110 m hurdles	Bye		13.35	5 Q	13.43	3rd place, bronze medalist(s)
Mathieu Jaquet	110 m hurdles	14.00	19	did not advance			
Julien Bonvin	400 m hurdles	49.41 SB	5 q	49.95	20	did not advance	
Dany Brand	400 m hurdles	49.99	13	did not advance			
Nahom Yirga	400 m hurdles	DNS		did not advance			
Michael Curti	3000 metres steeplechase	8:35.34	22	—N/a		did not advance	
Bradley Lestrade; Enrico Güntert; Fabio Luginbühl; Pascal Mancini; Timothé Mumenthaler; William Reais; Felix Svensson	4 × 100 m	38.70	7 q	—N/a		38.68	5
Dany Brand; Julien Bonvin; Charles Devantay; Vincent Gendre; Ricky Petrucciani; Lionel Spitz; Nahom Yirga	4 × 400 m	DQ		—N/a		did not advance	

Field events

Athlete	Event	Qualification		Final	
Athlete	Event	Result	Rank	Result	Rank
Dominik Alberto	Pole Vault	5.25	21	did not advance	
Simon Ehammer	Long Jump	8.41	1 Q	8.31	3rd place, bronze medalist(s)

Combined events – Decathlon

Athlete	Event	100 m	LJ	SP	HJ	400 m	110H	DT	PV	JT	1500 m	Final	Rank
Finley Gaio	Result	10.71	7.45	14.15	1.90	48.47	14.04	42.11	4.90	47.76	4:47.32	7934	14
Finley Gaio	Points	926	922	738	714	886	969	708	880	556	635	7934	14

=== Women ===
Track and road events

Athlete	Event	Heat		Semifinal		Final	
Athlete	Event	Result	Rank	Result	Rank	Result	Rank
Géraldine Frey	100 m	11.25	4 q	11.29	16	did not advance	
Salome Kora	100 m	Bye		11.29	15	did not advance	
Mujinga Kambundji	100 m	Bye		11.09	7 q	11.15	8
Mujinga Kambundji	200 m	Bye		22.52	2 Q	22.49 SB	1st place, gold medalist(s)
Léonie Pointet	200 m	Bye		23.17	14	did not advance	
Sarah Atcho-Jaquier	200 m	23.35	11 q	23.21	17	did not advance	
Fabienne Hoenke	200 m	23.59	20	did not advance			
Julia Niederberger	400 m	52.42 SB	13	52.97	24	did not advance	
Giulia Senn	400 m	52.24 SB	12 q	52.16 SB	16	did not advance	
Lore Hoffmann	800 m	2:00.98	8 Q	2:00.41	8 Q	2:01.13	7
Rachel Pellaud	800 m	DQ		did not advance			
Valentina Rosamilia	800 m	2:00.98	10 q	2:00.83	13	did not advance	
Joceline Wind	1500 m	4:15.06	22	—N/a		did not advance	
Helen Bekele	Half Marathon	—N/a				1:11:36 SB	22
Fabienne Schlumpf	Half Marathon	—N/a				1:10:01 SB	7
Ditaji Kambundji	100 m hurdles	Bye		12.79	6 Q	12.40 NR EU23R	2nd place, silver medalist(s)
Yasmin Giger	400 m hurdles	55.33 SB	3 q	55.05 PB	14	did not advance	
Annina Fahr	400 m hurdles	56.59 SB	15	did not advance			
Shirley Lang	3000 m steeplechase	DNF		—N/a		did not advance	
Chiara Scherrer	3000 m steeplechase	DNF		—N/a		did not advance	
Sarah Atcho-Jaquier; Celine Burgi; Géraldine Frey; Salomé Kora; Natacha Kouni; Léonie Pointet; Emma Van Camp	4 × 100 m	42.76	5 Q	—N/a		DQ	
Annina Fahr; Yasmin Giger; Catia Gubelmann; Julia Niederberger; Giulia Senn; Rachel Pellaud; Lena Wernli	4 × 400 m	3:27.48 SB	11	—N/a		did not advance	

Field events

Athlete	Event	Qualification		Final	
Athlete	Event	Result	Rank	Result	Rank
Salome Lang	High Jump	1.81	24	did not advance	
Angelica Moser	Pole Vault	4.50	6 q	4.78 PB	1st place, gold medalist(s)
Pascale Stöcklin	Pole Vault	4.50	6 q	4.28	12
Lea Bachmann	Pole Vault	4.40	19	did not advance	
Annik Kälin	Long Jump	6.83	2 Q	6.82	6
Daniela Gubler	Long Jump	6.26	27	did not advance	
Miryam Mazenauer	Shot Put	16.69	16	did not advance	

Combined events – Heptathlon

Athlete	Event	100H	HJ	SP	200 m	LJ	JT	800 m	Final	Rank
Annik Kälin	Result	13.14	1.71	13.61	23.96	6.84 CHB	45.46	2:16.17	6490	4
Annik Kälin	Points	1103	867	768	985	1119	772	876	6490	4
