= 2024 European Athletics Championships – Women's 800 metres =

Women's 800 metres at the 2024 European Athletics Championships
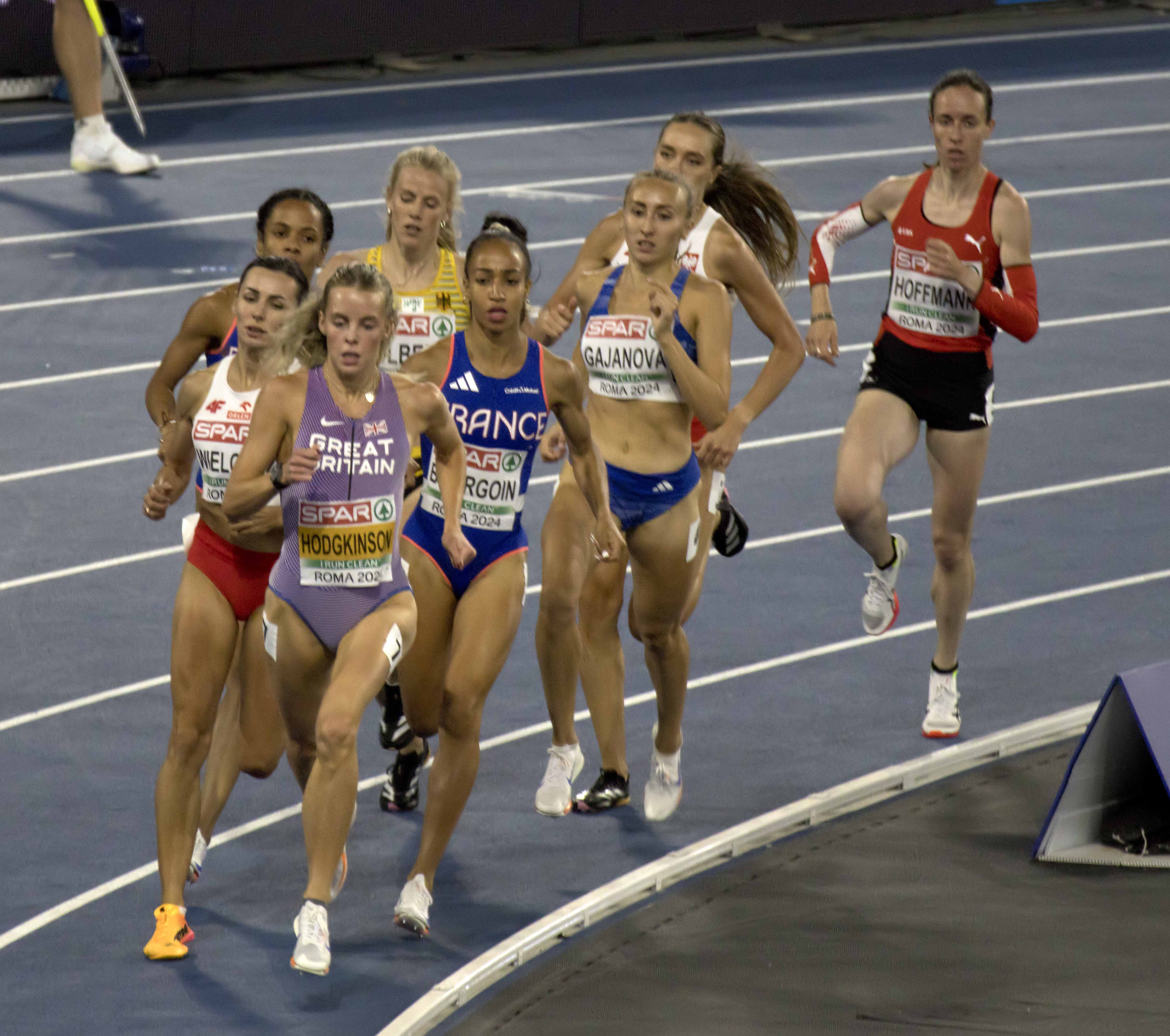
- Keely Hodgkinson in the lead during the final
- Venue: Stadio Olimpico
- Location: Rome, Italy
- Dates: 10 June 2024 (round 1); 11 June 2024 (semi-finals); 12 June 2024 (final)
- Competitors: 31 from 20 nations
- Winning time: 1:58.65 min

Medalists
gold medal	Keely Hodgkinson	Great Britain
silver medal	Gabriela Gajanová	Slovakia
bronze medal	Anaïs Bourgoin	France

The women's 800 metres at the 2024 European Athletics Championships was held over three rounds at the Stadio Olimpico in Rome, Italy, from 10 to 12 June 2024. This was the twenty-second time that the event was contested at the European Athletics Championships. Athletes could qualify by running the entry standard of 2:00.00 min, by wild card for the defending champion, or by their World Athletics Rankings position.

Thirty-one athletes from twenty nations competed in the four heats of round 1, where sixteen athletes advanced to the semi-finals. From there, eight athletes advanced further to compete in the final, that was won by defending champion Keely Hodgkinson of Great Britain and Northern Ireland in 1:58.65 min, while having a mild illness, followed by Gabriela Gajanová of Slovakia in 1:58.79 min in second place and Anaïs Bourgoin of France in 1:59.30 min in third place.

== Background ==
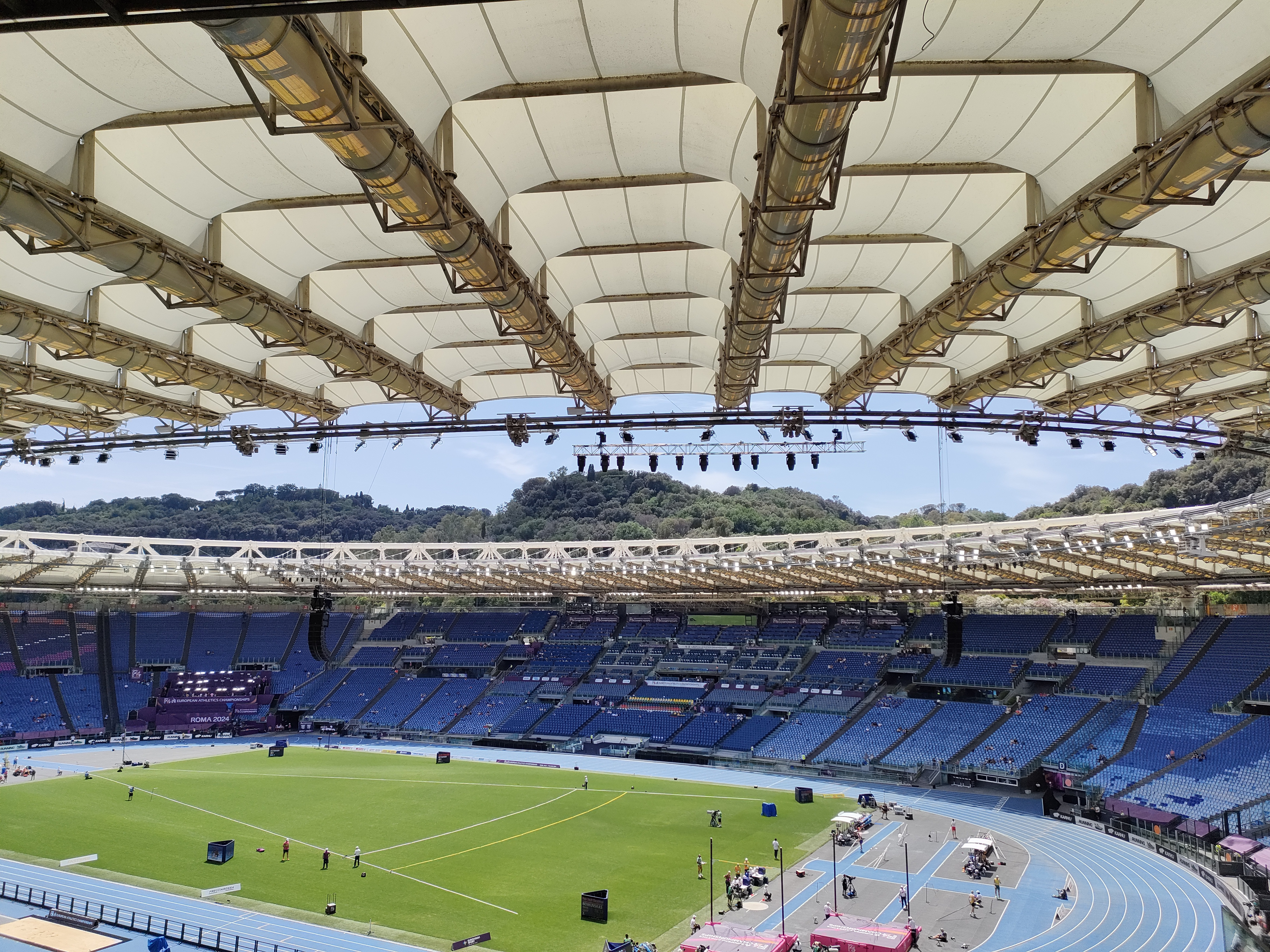
Stadio Olimpico in June 2024

In the 800 metres, athletes run two laps on a standard 400-metre track, where they start in separate lanes and break for the inside lanes after the first bend. At the European Athletics Championships, this women's event was introduced at the 1954 championships and had been contested twenty-one times before 2024. The track and field events of the 2024 championships were held at the Stadio Olimpico (English: Olympic Stadium) in Rome, Italy.

At the start of the 2024 European Athletics Championships, the world and European record was 1:53.28 min set by Jarmila Kratochvílová of Czechoslovakia in 1983, the championship record was 1:55.41 min set by Olga Mineyeva of the Soviet Union at the 1982 European Athletics Championships, and the world and European leading performance was 1:55.78 min ran by Keely Hodgkinson of Great Britain and Northern Ireland at the 2024 Prefontaine Classic. Hodgkinson was also the defending champion after winning the 2022 European Athletics Championships final in 1:59.04 min.

Records before the 2024 European Athletics Championships
Record	Athlete (nation)	Time	Location	Date
World record	Jarmila Kratochvílová (TCH)	1:53.28	Munich, West Germany	26 July 1983
European record	Jarmila Kratochvílová (TCH)	1:53.28	Munich, West Germany	26 July 1983
Championship record	Olga Mineyeva (URS)	1:55.41	Athens, Greece	8 September 1982
World leading	Keely Hodgkinson (GBR)	1:55.78	Eugene, United States	25 May 2024
Europe leading	Keely Hodgkinson (GBR)	1:55.78	Eugene, United States	25 May 2024

== Qualification ==
For the women's 800 metres, athletes could qualify by running the entry standard of 2:00.00 min or faster during the qualification period from 27 May 2023 to 26 May 2024, by wild card as the defending champion from the 2022 European Athletics Championships, or by their position on the World Athletics Rankings for the event on 26 May 2024. The target number was thirty-two athletes. The final entry list contained thirty-one athletes from twenty nations.

== Results ==
=== Round 1 ===
On 10 June 2024, thirty-one athletes from twenty nations competed in the four heats of round 1, starting at 11:50 (UTC+2). The first three fastest athletes in each heat (Q) and the next four fastest athletes overall (q) qualified for the semi-finals. In the second heat, Rachel Pellaud of Switzerland was disqualified (DQ) for lane infringement (TR17.2.3). In the third heat, Wilma Nielsen of Sweden ran a personal best (PB) of 2:01.82 min.

Results of round 1
Rank	Heat	Lane	Athlete	Nation	Time	Note
1	4	9	Majtie Kolberg	Germany	2:00.23	Q, SB
2	3	8	Gabriela Gajanová	Slovakia	2:00.31	Q
3	4	3	Anna Wielgosz	Poland	2:00.50	Q, SB
4	4	8	Daniela García	Spain	2:00.70	Q
5	4	7	Anita Horvat	Slovenia	2:00.73	q
6	1	7	Léna Kandissounon	France	2:00.76	Q, SB
7	4	6	Erin Wallace	Great Britain & N.I.	2:00.90	q
8	1	2	Lore Hoffmann	Switzerland	2:00.98	Q
9	1	9	Alexandra Bell	Great Britain & N.I.	2:00.98	Q
10	4	5	Valentina Rosamilia	Switzerland	2:00.98	q
11	1	4	Angelika Sarna	Poland	2:01.09	q
12	1	5	Lorea Ibarzabal	Spain	2:01.15	
13	1	8	Olha Lyakhova	Ukraine	2:01.51	
14	3	2	Eveliina Määttänen	Finland	2:01.59	Q
15	3	4	Wilma Nielsen	Sweden	2:01.82	Q, PB
16	3	5	Lorena Martín	Spain	2:02.21	
17	2	8	Keely Hodgkinson	Great Britain & N.I.	2:02.46	Q
18	2	6	Anaïs Bourgoin	France	2:02.55	Q
19	3	3	Adrianna Topolnicka	Poland	2:02.58	
20	2	4	Charline Mathias	Luxembourg	2:02.65	Q
21	3	9	Nina Vukovic	Croatia	2:02.74	
22	3	6	Elena Bellò	Italy	2:02.75	
23	2	3	Eloisa Coiro	Italy	2:02.86	
24	3	7	Nataliya Krol	Ukraine	2:02.87	
25	1	6	Dilek Koçak	Turkey	2:02.87	
26	4	2	Bianka Kéri	Hungary	2:03.37	
27	4	4	Janet Richard	Malta	2:04.34	
28	2	9	Louise Shanahan	Ireland	2:04.81	
29	2	7	Patricia Silva	Portugal	2:05.03	
30	1	3	Gresa Bakraçi	Kosovo	2:08.35	
31	2	5	Rachel Pellaud	Switzerland	DQ	TR17.2.3

=== Semi-finals ===
On 11 June 2024, sixteen athletes from eleven nations competed in the two heats of the semi-finals, starting at 10:10 (UTC+2). The first three fastest athletes from each heat (Q) and the next two fastest athletes overall (q) qualified for the final. In the first heat, four athletes ran personal bests (PB): Anaïs Bourgoin of France in 1:58.65 min, Majtie Kolberg of Germany in 1:58.74 min, Anna Wielgosz of Poland in 1:59.07 min, and Wilma Nielsen of Sweden in 2:00.86 min.

Results of the semi-finals
Rank	Heat	Lane	Athlete	Nation	Time	Note
1	1	6	Keely Hodgkinson	Great Britain & N.I.	1:58.07	Q
2	1	4	Anaïs Bourgoin	France	1:58.65	Q, PB
3	1	8	Majtie Kolberg	Germany	1:58.74	Q, PB
4	1	2	Anna Wielgosz	Poland	1:59.07	q, PB
5	1	7	Gabriela Gajanová	Slovakia	1:59.43	q, SB
6	1	5	Erin Wallace	Great Britain & N.I.	1:59.89	
7	2	7	Léna Kandissounon	France	2:00.11	Q, SB
8	2	2	Angelika Sarna	Poland	2:00.37	Q, SB
9	2	6	Lore Hoffmann	Switzerland	2:00.41	Q
10	2	5	Alexandra Bell	Great Britain & N.I.	2:00.57	
11	2	4	Daniela García	Spain	2:00.68	
12	2	3	Charline Mathias	Luxembourg	2:00.78	SB
13	1	9	Valentina Rosamilia	Switzerland	2:00.83	
14	1	3	Wilma Nielsen	Sweden	2:00.86	PB
15	2	9	Eveliina Määttänen	Finland	2:01.49	
16	2	8	Anita Horvat	Slovenia	2:04.30	

=== Final ===
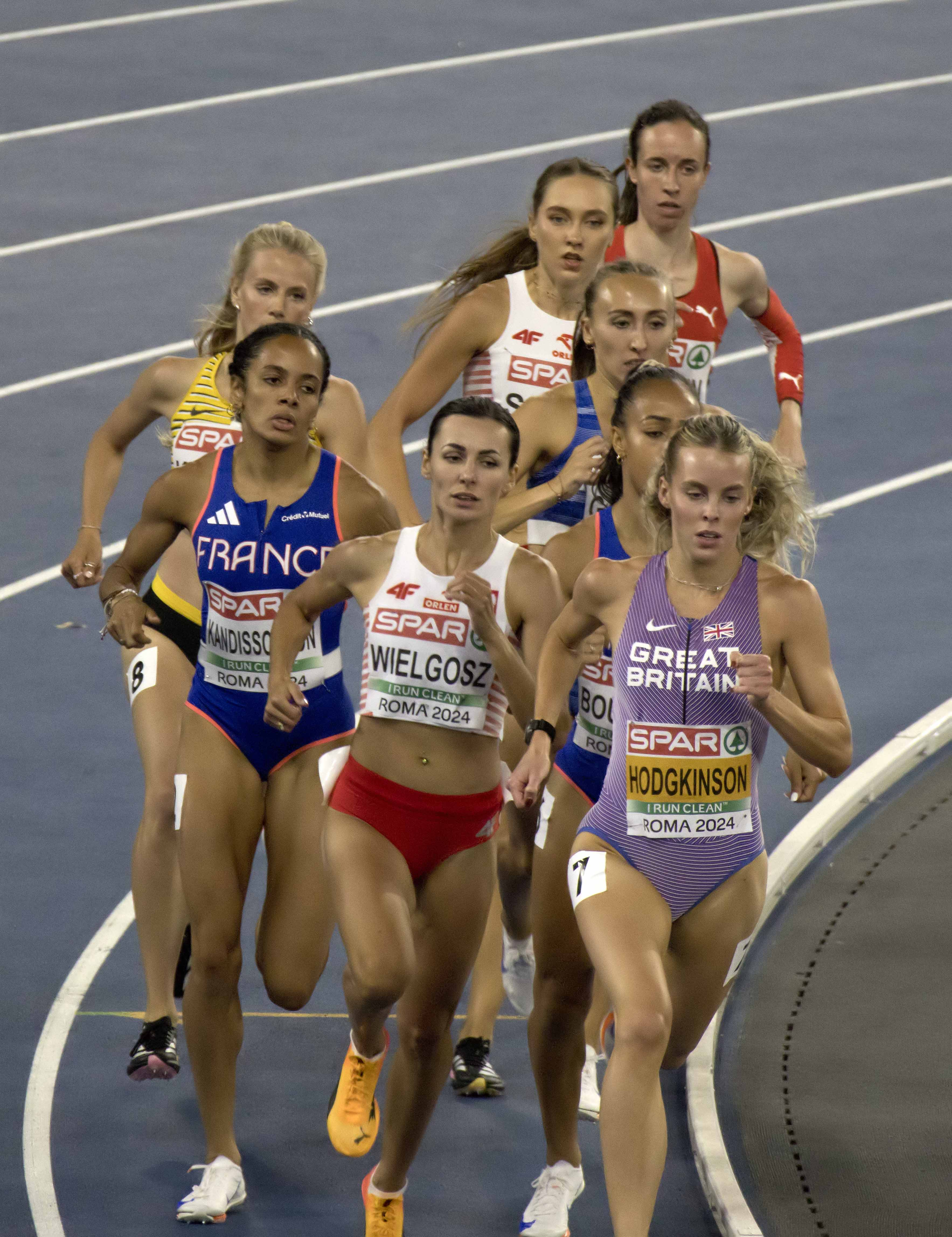
The eight finalists with Keely Hodgkinson in front during the final race

On 12 June 2024, eight athletes from six nations competed in the final starting at 21:28 (UTC+2). Defending champion Keely Hodgkinson of Great Britain and Northern Ireland was in first position after the first lap in 58.55 s. She was "controlling the pace from the front, kicking into the home straight and then holding off a plucky late challenge from Gabriela Gajanová of the Slovak Republic," according to Jason Henderson of Athletics Weekly. The final was won by Hodgkinson in 1:58.65 min, retaining the European title, followed by Gajanová in 1:58.79 min in second place and Anaïs Bourgoin of France in 1:59.30 min in third place.

Hogdkinson said that she had a mild illness during the final and added in an interview: "I wanted to go out and get a good time today but I'm happy with the win. I think I would have been disappointed if I didn't try." She also said: "I do believe in myself and I thought the best way, the easiest way and the safest way to do it was to go to the front and control it and I backed my strength and speed to deliver the gold." Gajanová said: "I wasn't expecting to win and it was my dream to simply win a medal because I have a lot of respect for Keely because she's an amazing athlete." Bourgoin said in a French interview: "It was super hard the whole race. It started very fast, it was hard at the bell (at 400 m), it was hard at 500 m, but I hung in there. I never stopped believing until the end. In the final straight, I saw a girl pass me, but I was able to pick myself back up and to go for the bronze medal."

Results of the final
Rank	Lane	Athlete	Nation	Time	Note
1st place, gold medalist(s)	7	Keely Hodgkinson	Great Britain & N.I.	1:58.65	
2nd place, silver medalist(s)	4	Gabriela Gajanová	Slovakia	1:58.79	SB
3rd place, bronze medalist(s)	6	Anaïs Bourgoin	France	1:59.30	
4	2	Léna Kandissounon	France	1:59.81	SB
5	8	Majtie Kolberg	Germany	1:59.87	
6	9	Anna Wielgosz	Poland	1:59.99	
7	5	Lore Hoffmann	Switzerland	2:01.13	
8	3	Angelika Sarna	Poland	2:01.21	
