= Gabriela Gajanová =

Slovak middle-distance runner

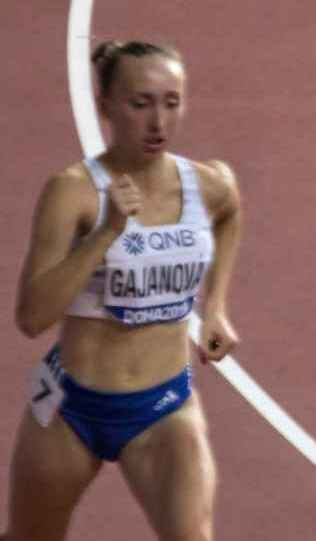
- Gajanová in 2019

Personal information
- Nationality: Slovak
- Born: 12 October 1999 (age 26) Liptovský Mikuláš, Slovakia
- Height: 1.68 m (5 ft 6 in)
- Weight: 58 kg (128 lb)

Sport
- Country: Slovakia
- Sport: Athletics
- Event: 800 metres
- Club: AK ZŤS Martin
- Coached by: Louis Heyer, Pavel Slouka

Achievements and titles
- Personal bests: 600 m: 1:26.34 (Langenthal, 2024) NR; 800 m: 1:58.22 (Paris, 2024) NR; 1000 m 2:36.42 (Silesia, 2024) NR
Medal record
Women's athletics
Representing Slovakia
European Championships
Silver medal – second place	2024 Rome	800 m
European Games
Bronze medal – third place	2023 Kraków-Małopolska	800 m
European U20 Championships
Bronze medal – third place	2017 Grosetto	800 m
European U18 Championships
Bronze medal – third place	2016 Tbilisi	800 m

Gabriela Gajanová (born 12 October 1999) is a Slovak middle-distance runner specialising in the 800 metres. Gajanová won a bronze medal at the 2017 European U20 Championships. She won silver in the 800 metres at the 2024 European Athletics Championships in Rome, Italy.

== Early life ==
Gajanová was born on 12 October 1999 in the town of Liptovský Mikuláš. She started running when she was eleven years old, having previously played association football. Later she started both athletics and cross-country running. Her first running competition she ran in the neighboring village Liptovská Ondrašová and won it despite little experience.

== Career ==
=== Junior career ===
Gabriela Gajanová gained her first international experience in 2015, when she was eliminated in the first round of the 400-meter run at the 2015 European Youth Summer Olympic Festival in Tbilisi with a time of 57.91, and was also unable to qualify for the final with the Slovak 4 × 100 meter relay team with a time of 49.28. The following year, she won the bronze medal in the 800 meters at the inaugural 2016 European Athletics Youth Championships in Tbilisi at 2:09.43, as well as at the 2017 European Athletics U20 Championships in Grosseto at 2:07.15. She also finished eighth with the Slovak 4 × 400 m relay in 3:44.46 minutes. In 2018, she finished fourth at the U20 World Championships in Tampere in 2:01.90, and also qualified for the European Championships in Berlin, where she was eliminated in the preliminary round with a time of 2:02.57.

=== Senior career ===
At the 2019 European Athletics U23 Championships in Gävle she finished fourth in the 800 m individual competition in 2:06.78 minutes and sixth in the women's 4 × 400 m relay in 3:46.26 minutes. She also took part in the World Championships in Doha for the first time and was eliminated in the heats with a time of 2:04.45 minutes. In 2020, she won the P-T-S Meeting in 2:01.26 minutes. The following year she was eliminated in the heats of the 800 m at the U23 European Championships in Tallinn with a time of 2:04.50 minutes, she also ran as part of the Slovak 4 × 400 meter relay team however they were eliminated in the heats with a time of 3:45.02 minutes. She then took part in the Olympic Games in Tokyo for the first time, but did not make it past the heats with a time of 2:01.41 min.

In 2023, she reached the semifinals of the 800 metres at the European Indoor Championships in Istanbul and was eliminated there with a new national record of 2:01.70 min. In June, she finished third in the 2nd league of the European Team Championships as part of the European Games in Chorzów in 1:59.92 minutes and finished second in the B run with the mixed relay over 4 × 400 meters in 3:19.84 minutes. In August, she was eliminated at the World Championships in Budapest with 2:00.39 minutes in the first round over 800 meters. At the World Athletics Continental Tour in Bellinzona, Gajanová ran a time of 1:58.78 in the 800 metres, surpassing the qualification threshold for 2024 Summer Olympics.

From 2019 to 2023, Gajanová became Slovak champion in the 800-meter outdoor race, as well as indoor champion over 1500 meters in 2020 and over 400 meters in 2023. In 2024, Gajanová took a somewhat surprising silver at the European Athletics Championships in Rome. After not being among the top in the heats but still managing to advance, she strong on the run and was close to sprinting down the pre-favourite Keely Hodgkinson. The time was 1:58.79, the second best in her career.

At the 2024 Summer Olympics in Paris, Gajanová beat the Slovak record in 800 m, held since 1987 by Gabriela Sedláková, with the time 1:58.22. Nonetheless, this time did not suffice to qualify for the finals.

== International competitions ==
Year	Competition	Venue	Position	Event	Notes
Representing Slovakia
2015	European Youth Olympic Festival	Tbilisi, Georgia	15th (h)	400 m	57.91
2015	European Youth Olympic Festival	Tbilisi, Georgia	4th (h)	4 × 100 m relay	49.28
2016	European Youth Championships	Tbilisi, Georgia	3rd	800 m	2:09.43
2017	European U20 Championships	Grosseto, Italy	3rd	800 m	2:07.15
2017	European U20 Championships	Grosseto, Italy	8th	4 × 400 m relay	3:44.46
2018	World U20 Championships	Tampere, Finland	4th	800 m	2:01.90
2018	European Championships	Berlin, Germany	16th (h)	800 m	2:02.57
2019	European U23 Championships	Gävle, Sweden	4th	800 m	2:06.78
2019	European U23 Championships	Gävle, Sweden	6th	4 × 400 m relay	3:46.26
2019	World Championships	Doha, Qatar	36th (h)	800 m	2:04.45
2021	European U23 Championships	Tallinn, Estonia	9th (h)	800 m	2:04.50
2021	Olympic Games	Tokyo, Japan	18th (h)	800 m	2:01.41
2023	European Indoor Championships	Istanbul, Turkey	6th (sf)	800 m	2:01.70
2023	World Championships	Budapest, Hungary	23rd (h)	800 m	2:00.39
2023	European Games	Chorzów, Poland	3rd	800 m	1:59.92
2024	European Championships	Rome, Italy	2nd	800 m	1:58.79
2024	Olympic Games	Paris, France	11th (sf)	800 m	1:58.22 NR
2024	Kamila Skolimowska Memorial	Chorzów, Poland	7th	1000 m	2:36.42 NR
2025	European Indoor Championships	Apeldoorn, Netherlands	18th (h)	800 m	2:04.95
2025	World Championships	Tokyo, Japan	17th (sf)	800 m	1:59.16
2026	World Indoor Championships	Toruń, Poland	9th (sf)	800 m	2:00.49
2026	European Championships	Birmingham, United Kingdom	12th (sf)	800 m	1:59.32

== Personal bests ==
Outdoor

- 400 metres – 53.67.40 (Banská Bystrica 2024)
- 600 metres – 1:26.34 (Langenthal 2024, NR)
- 800 metres – 1:58.22 (Paris 2024, NR)
- 1000 metres – 2:36.42 (Chorzów 2024, NR)
- 1500 metres - 4:24.63 (Břeclav 2021)

Indoor

- 400 metres – 55.32 (Bratislava 2023)
- 800 metres – 2:01.70 (Istanbul 2023, NR)
- 1500 metres - 4:25.88 (Bratislava 2020)
