= Lauren Cadden =

Irish athlete (born 2000)

Personal information
- Nationality: Irish
- Born: 7 June 2000 (age 26)

Sport
- Sport: Athletics
- Event: Sprint

Achievements and titles
- Personal bests: 400m: 52.87 (Salamanca, 2024)
Medal record
Women's athletics
Representing Ireland
European Championships
Silver medal – second place	2024 Rome	4×400 m relay

Lauren Cadden (born 7 June 2000) is an Irish sprinter. She is a European Athletics Championships silver medallist, having run with the Ireland team in the Women's 4 × 400 metres relay in the 2024 competition.

== Early life ==
From Skreen in County Sligo, she has four brothers and played Gaelic Football before concentrating on athletics. She attended Ursuline College Sligo and studied Health Science and Physical Activity at ATU Sligo.

== Career ==
A member of Sligo Athletics Club, in February 2024, she was selected to run for Ireland at the 2024 World Athletics Indoor Championships in Glasgow.

In April 2024, she lowered her personal best over 400 metres to 54.22 in Belfast. She later lowered it again to 53.38 to win the Irish Universities Championships hosted by Queen's University at the Mary Peters track in Belfast.

She ran as part of the Irish women's 4 × 400m relay team that qualified for the 2024 Paris Olympics at the 2024 World Athletics Relays in Nassau, Bahamas in May 2024.

In May 2024 she was selected for the Irish team for the 2024 European Athletics Championships in Rome. In June 2024 Cadden ran 400 metres under 53 seconds for the first time, setting a new personal best of 52.87 seconds in the Spanish city of Salamanca. She then ran as part of the women's 4 × 400m relay team that qualified fastest for the final, with the team ultimately going on to win silver.

She qualified for the Irish team for the 2025 European Athletics Indoor Championships in Apeldoorn in the individual 400 metres as well as being included for the relay. In the women's 4 × 400m relay she ran with the Irish team, placing sixth overall. competed at the 2025 World Athletics Relays in China in the Mixed 4 × 400 metres relay in May 2025.
