= Majtie Kolberg =

German middle-distance runner

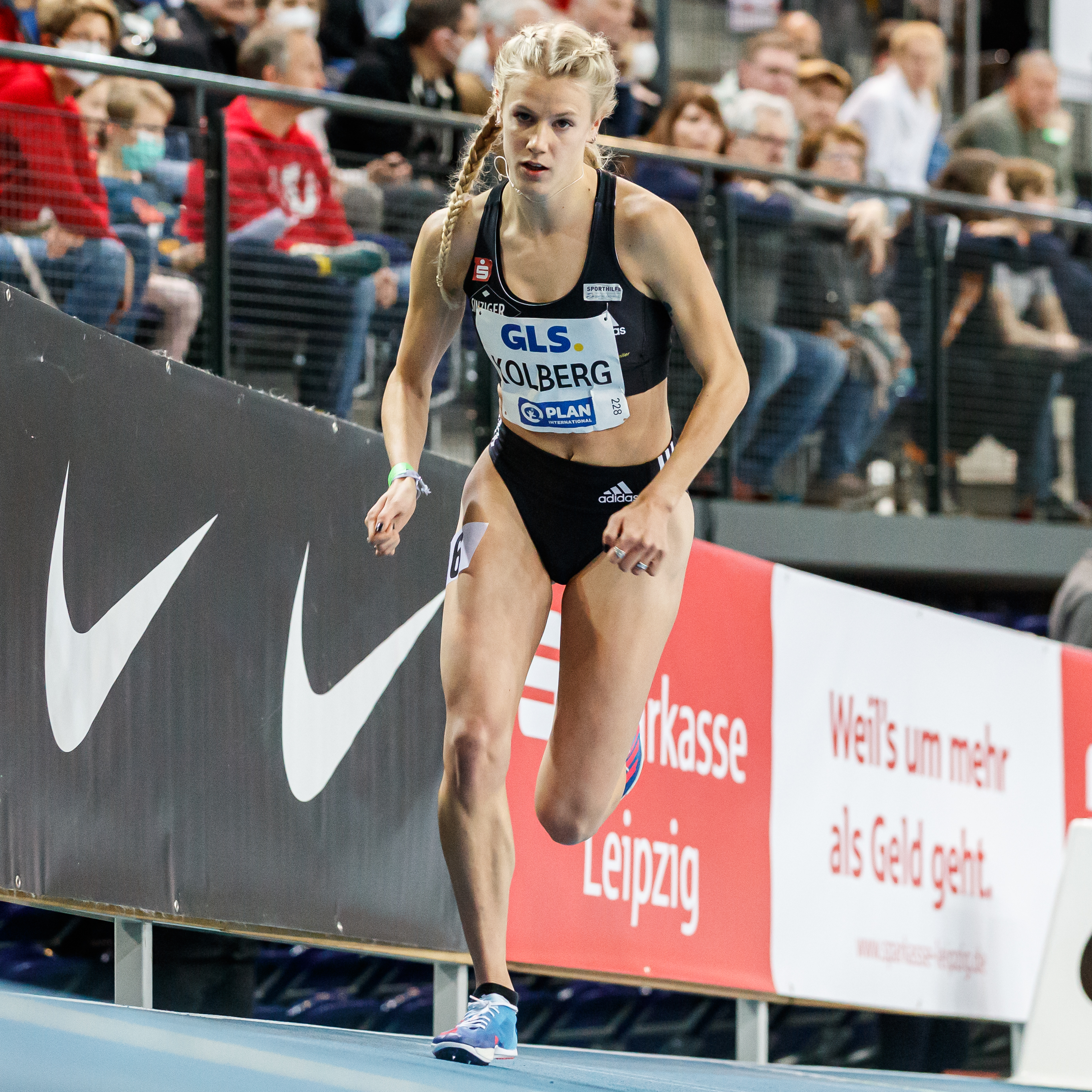
- Kolberg in 2022

Personal information
- Nationality: German
- Born: 5 December 1999 (age 26)

Sport
- Country: Germany
- Sport: Athletics
- Event: 800 metres

Achievements and titles
- Personal bests: 800 m: 1:58.52 (Paris, 2024); 1500 m: 4:05.67 (Turku, 2026)

Majtie Kolberg (born 5 December 1999) is a German middle-distance runner who has won German national championships titles in both the 800 metres and 1500 metres. She has competed at multiple major championships, including the 2024 Olympic Games.

== Biography ==
From Ahrweiler, Kolberg became German 800 metres U23 champion in 2021. She finished second when making the step up to the senior German Championships the following year, finishing behind sometime training partner Christina Hering. Kolberg placed also second indoors that year.

Competing at the 2022 World Athletics Championships held in Eugene, Oregon, she qualified from the heats to make the semi-finals in the women's 800 metres.

At the 2023 European Indoor Championships in Istanbul, Kolberg ran new 800 m personal bests, finishing eighth in the final with a time of 2:01.49.

In May 2024, she was selected for the 2024 European Athletics Championships in Rome. She set a new personal best of 1:58.74 to qualify for the final of the 800 metres. She ran to fifth place in the final in a time of 1:59.89. She competed in the 800 metres at the 2024 Summer Olympics in Paris in August 2024 where she ran a personal best of 1:58.52 in the semi-final.

She won the German 1500 metres indoor title in Dortmund in February 2025. She competed over 800 metres at the 2025 European Athletics Indoor Championships in Apeldoorn, Netherlands in March 2025, but she did not progress to the semi-finals.

She was runner-up to Smilla Kolbe over 800 metres at the German Athletics Championships in Dresden in August 2025. She competed in the women's 800 metres at the 2025 World Athletics Championships in Tokyo, Japan.

Kolberg retained her 1500 metres title at the 2026 German Indoor Athletics Championships in Dortmund. In August, she competed at the 2026 European Athletics Championships in Birmingham, England, in the women's 800 metres.

== Personal bests ==
Her personal bests for 800 metres are 1:58.52 outdoors (Paris 2024) and 2:01.49 indoors (Istanbul 2023).
