= Luna Bulmahn =

German sprinter

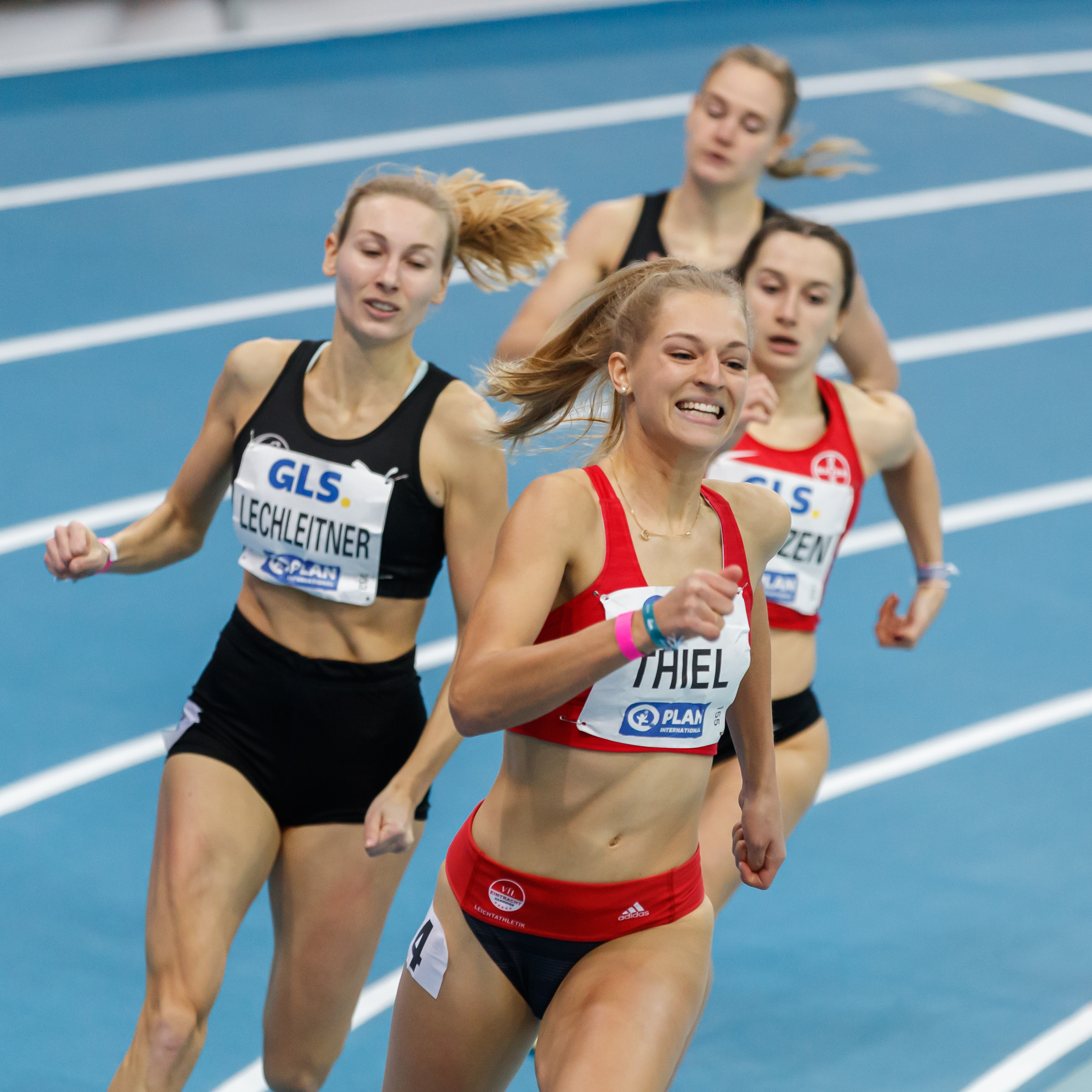

Personal information
- Nationality: German
- Born: Luna Bulmahn; 26 November 1999 (age 26) Bückeburg

Sport
- Sport: Athletics
- Event: Sprinting

Luna Bredau (née Bulmahn, previously Thiel), born 26 November 1999) is a German athlete specializing in the 400m. She competed in the mixed 4 × 400 metres relay event at the 2019 World Athletics Championships.

== Career ==
=== Youth and Junior level ===
By 2018, she shifted her primary focus to the 400m, recording an outdoor personal best of 55.30s. Bredau made her international U23 debut at the 2019 Athletics U23 Championships in Gävle, Sweden, where she finished fourth in the individual 400m final in 52.94s and won a bronze medal as part of the 4x400m relay team alongside Nelly Schmidt, Corinna Schwab and Alica Schmidt.

=== National Level ===
On national level, Bredau initially competed for VfL Eintracht Hannover before transferring to VfL Wolfsburg. Following her club transfer, she relocated to Potsdam in October 2023 and temporarily trained Sven Buggel. In late 2024, she returned to Hannover, where she trains at the regional high-performance center under state head coach Marco Antoni.

She made her senior national breakthrough in early 2019 by winning a silver at the German Indoor Athletics Championships in the 400m. Later that summer, she captured her first national outdoor title at the German Athletics Championships in Berlin, winning the 400m with a time of 52.37s. Her career trajectory faced significant interruptions due to medical setbacks and injuries. She missed the entire 2020 outdoor season after contracting Infectious Mononucleosis during the preceding winter. Returning to competition in 2021, she placed sixth in the 400m final at the German Indoor Championships. In 2022, she consistently maintained her standing in the national top tier, culminating in her personal best of 51.28s over thee 400m at the ISTAF meeting in Berlin. In early 2023, her progress was halted by four stress fractures in her shines in early 2023. Bredau returned to competition in July 2023 and placed eighth in the 400m-final at the German Outdoor Athletics Championships in Kassel. She maintained her position among Germany´s top long sprinters through the 2024 season, which led to her nomination for the Olympic Games. In 2026, she returned to the national podium by securing a bronze medal in the 400m at the 2026 German Indoor Championships in Dortmund.

=== Senior International Level ===
Bredau made her senior global debut in May 2019 at the IAAF World Relays in Yokohama, Japan, running as the lead-off runner for the women´s 4x400m relay team. She also started at the 2019 World Athletics Championships in Doha, Qatar, in the heats of the 4x400m relay. At the 2022 European Athletics Championships in Munich, she ran the opening leg in the final for the German women´s 4x400m relay team, which finsihed fifth in the final. At the 2024 European Athletics Championships in Rome, Bredau was part of the quartet that set the best time since 2021 of 3:25.90min. in the heats before placing eighth in the final.

She was selected for the German delegation of the 4x400m women´s relay at the 2024 Summer Olympics in Paris after running a season-best time of 51.72s, which was the second-fastest 400m time by a German woman that season. Prior to the competition, Bredau expressed disagreement over the German Athletics Association´s (DLV) decision to omit her from the mixed 4x400m relay lineup in favour of Alica Schmidt. Following the public statements and internal team disruption, the DLV chose to remove her from all relay lineups at the Games, and she consequently did not participate in any Olympic events.

== Personal bests ==
200m: 23.87s (Mannheim)

300m: 36.89s (Santa Lucía de Tirajana)

400m: 51.28s (Berlin)

== Personal life ==
Luna Bredau married the german 400m-sprinter Jean Paul Bredau 2026 and adopted his surname.
