= Maryana Shostak =

Ukrainian hurdler and sprinter

Personal information
- Nationality: Ukrainian
- Born: October 24, 2000 (age 25) Drohobych, Lviv Oblast, Ukraine
- Height: 1.70 m (5 ft 7 in)
- Weight: 57 kg (126 lb)

Sport
- Sport: Track and field
- Event: 400 metres
- Coached by: Vitaliy Tarnakin

Achievements and titles
- Personal best: 400 m: 51.99 (2024)

Maryana Shostak (Ukrainian: Шостак Мар'яна Володимирівна; born 24 October 2000 in Drohobych) is a Ukrainian track and field sprinter who competes in the 400 metres. She represented her country at the 2024 Summer Olympics. Together with Oleksandr Pohorilko, Tetyana Melnyk, and Danylo Danylenko, she finished 14th in the mixed 4 × 400 metres relay.

She competed in the 400 metres at the 2024 European Athletics Championships, reaching the semi-finals and finishing 13th.

She studies at the Lviv State University of Physical Culture.

== Personal bests ==
- 400 metres – 51.99 (2024)
