= Sounkamba Sylla =

French athlete (born 1998)

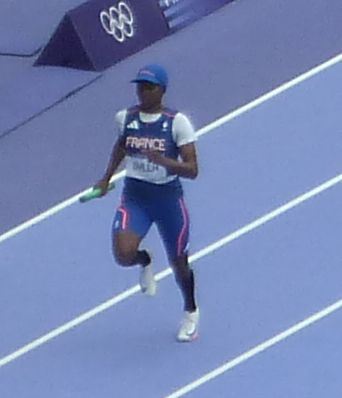
- Sylla in 2024

Personal information
- Nationality: French
- Born: 9 July 1998 (age 28) Laval, Mayenne
- Height: 170 cm (5 ft 7 in)
- Weight: 60 kg (132 lb)

Sport
- Country: France
- Sport: Athletics
- Event: Sprint

Achievements and titles
- Personal bests: 400m: 51.80s (Forbach, 2024)

Sounkamba Sylla (born 9 July 1998) is a French sprinter. She has represented France at multiple major championships, including the 2024 Olympic Games.

== Career ==
She was selected as a travelling reserve for the 2020 Tokyo Olympics.

She ran for France in the women's 4x400m relay team at the 2022 World Athletics Championships in Eugene, Oregon.

She was a member of the French women's 4x400m relay team at the 2023 World Athletics Championships in Budapest.

She ran as part of the French team at the 2024 World Relays Championships in Nassau, Bahamas. She ran in the women's 4x400m relay at the 2024 European Athletics Championships in Rome in June 2024. Later that month, she finished fourth in the 400 metres at the French Athletics Championships in Angers.

She was selected for France’s 400m women’s and mixed relay teams at the 2024 Paris Olympics. She expressed disappointment on social media that she would be unable to attend the opening ceremony due to her desire to wear a hijab, included on a list of items France’s minister for sport had prohibited in September 2023, saying that athletes representing France would be barred from displaying religious symbols. However, a compromise was reported, shortly before the ceremony, that would allow Sylla to wear a French Olympic cap on her head. She ran as part of the French women's 4x400 metres relay team which qualified for the final.

On 10 April 2025, she was named in the French team for the 2025 World Athletics Relays in Guangzhou, China in May 2025.

== Personal life ==
She is from Laval, Mayenne. She is Muslim.
