= Anaïs Bourgoin =

French athlete (born 1996)

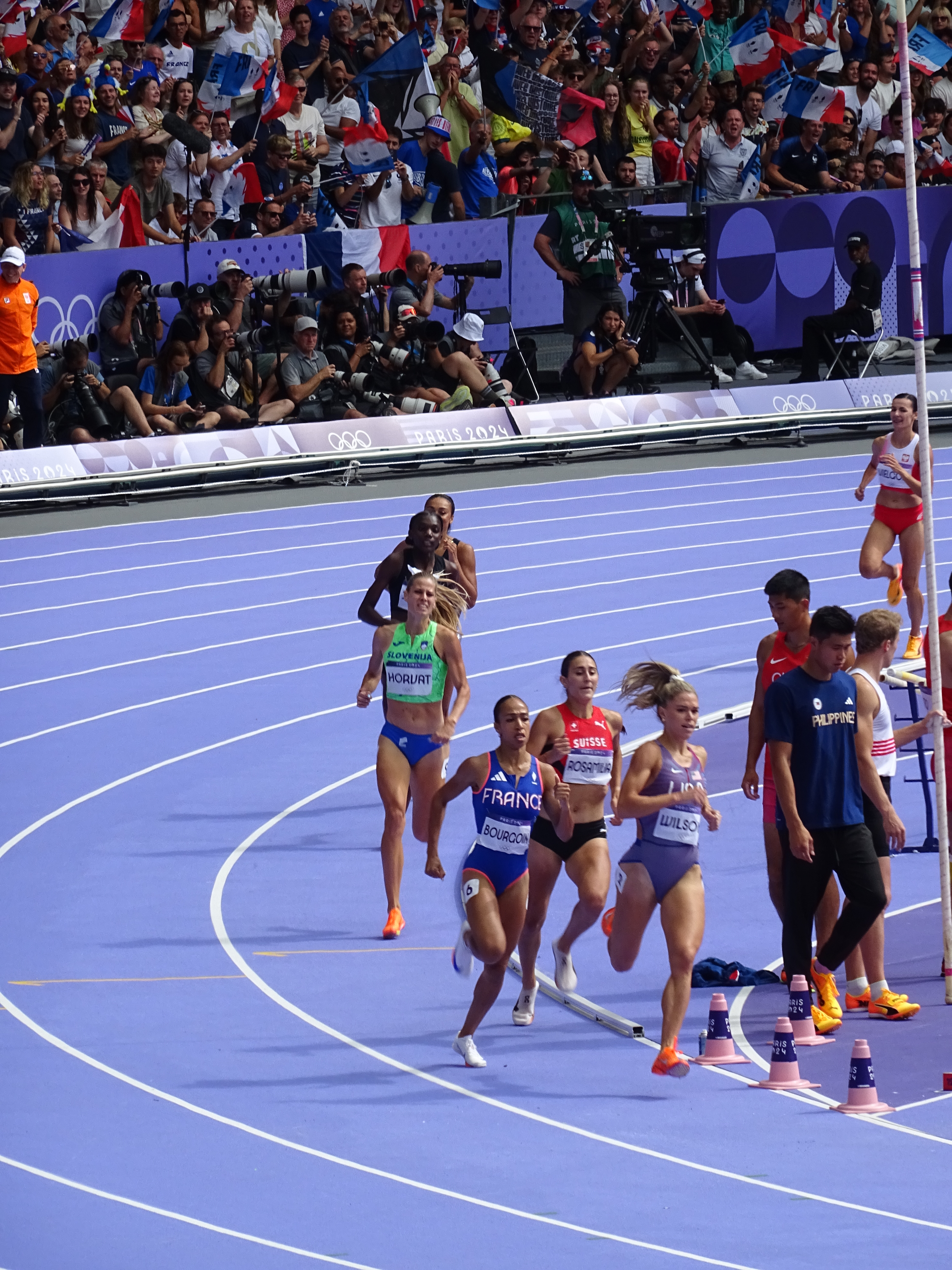
- Competing at the 2024 Olympic Games

Personal information
- Born: 3 October 1996 (age 29) Vendôme, France
- Height: 165 cm (5 ft 5 in)
- Weight: 52 kg (115 lb)

Sport
- Country: France
- Sport: Athletics
- Event: Middle distance running

Achievements and titles
- Personal bests: 800 m: 1:55.65 (Paris, 2026) NR
Medal record
Women's athletics
Representing France
European Championships
Bronze medal – third place	2024 Rome	800 m
European Cross Country Championships
Bronze medal – third place	2022 Turin	Mixed relay

Anaïs Bourgoin (born 3 October 1996) is a French middle-distance runner. She set a new French national record over 800 metres in 2026. She won the bronze medal at the 2024 European Championships over 800 metres and competed at the 2024 Olympic Games.

== Early life ==
At the age of 14 years-old and living near Bordeaux, she joined a sports studies program in Talence. She initially took part in triathlon before focusing on athletics. She moved to Paris and passed the police academy exams in 2018.

== Career ==
In June 2022, she was runner-up at the French Athletics Championships in the 1500 metres race in Caen. Bourgoin was a bronze medalist in the mixed relay at the 2022 European Cross Country Championships in Turin, Italy.

She won the French Indoor Athletics Championships title over 800 metres in Miramas in February 2024, running a time of 2:02.05.

She ran a personal best time of 1:58.65 to qualify for the final of the 800 metres at the 2024 European Athletics Championships in Rome, Italy in June 2024. She ran to a bronze medal in the final, running 1:59.30. She competed in the 800 metres at the 2024 Summer Olympics in Paris in August 2024, reaching the semi-final.

She finished in fourth place in the 800 metres at the French Indoor Athletics Championships in February 2025 in Miramas, running 2:05.79. She placed fourth in the 800 metres at the 2025 Meeting International Mohammed VI d'Athlétisme de Rabat, part of the 2025 Diamond League, in May 2025, running a personal best 1:57.81. The following month she won the 800 metres in 1:58.60 at the 2025 European Athletics Team Championships First Division. She finished fourth over 800 meters at the 2025 Prefontaine Classic on 5 July. She ran a 2:33.36 personal best over 1000 metres in Monaco at the 2025 Herculis. She placed fourth over 800m at the 2025 Athletissima in wet conditions in Lausanne. She placed third in a personal best 1:56.97 for the 800 metres at the Diamond League Final in Zurich on 28 August. She was a semi-finalist in the women's 800 metres at the 2025 World Athletics Championships in Tokyo, Japan.

In May 2026, she placed fifth in the 800 metres in the 2026 Diamond League meeting in Rabat. On 7 June, she placed fourth in the 800 m at the Diamond League event in Stockholm. On 28 June, she set a new French national record with 1:55.65 at the 2026 Meeting de Paris, breaking the previous best set by Patricia Djate in 1995. On 4 July, she ran 1:58.66 at the 2026 Prefontaine Classic. Competing at the European Championships in August, in Birmingham, England, she was a finalist in the 800 metres, placing ninth overall. In her semi-final she was involved in a racing incident in the closing stages after her hand inadvertently struck the foot of eventual gold-medalist Audrey Werro, causing the Swiss woman to fall, with Werro later reinstated into the final on appeal.

== Personal life ==
She is from Vendôme, and is a member of the Entente Franconville Césame in Val-d'Oise. She worked as a member of the French National Police, stepping aside from full-time work in 2023 in order to focus on her athletics career. She was a patron of the Sine Qua Non Run held in Paris on 15 March 2025, an activist race promoting gender equality, supporting women in their quest for public space, and combating all forms of sexist and sexual violence through sport.
