= 2024 European Athletics Championships – Men's 5000 metres =

Men's 5000 metres at the 2024 European Athletics Championships
- Venue: Stadio Olimpico
- Location: Rome
- Dates: 8 June (final)
- Competitors: 27 from 11 nations
- Winning time: 13:20.11

Medalists
gold medal	Jakob Ingebrigtsen	Norway
silver medal	George Mills	Great Britain
bronze medal	Dominic Lokinyomo Lobalu	Switzerland

The men's 5000 metres at the 2024 European Athletics Championships took place at the Stadio Olimpico on 8 June.

== Records ==
Standing records prior to the 2024 European Athletics Championships
World record	Joshua Cheptegei (UGA)	12:35.36	Monaco	14 August 2020
European record	Mohamed Katir (ESP)	12:45.01	Monaco	21 July 2023
Championship record	Jack Buckner (GBR)	13:10.15	Stuttgart, West Germany	31 August 1986
World Leading	Hagos Gebrhiwet (ETH)	12:36.73	Oslo, Norway	30 May 2024
Europe Leading	Thierry Ndikumwenayo (ESP)	12:48.10	Oslo, Norway	30 May 2024

== Schedule ==
Date	Time	Round
8 June 2024	22:28	Final

All times are local times (UTC+2)

== Results ==
=== Final ===
Rank	Name	Nationality	Time	Note
1st place, gold medalist(s)	Jakob Ingebrigtsen	Norway	13:20.11	SB
2nd place, silver medalist(s)	George Mills	Great Britain	13:21.38	
3rd place, bronze medalist(s)	Dominic Lokinyomo Lobalu	Switzerland	13:21.61	
4	Adel Mechaal	Spain	13:22.77	
5	Thierry Ndikumwenayo	Spain	13:23.26	
6	Elzan Bibić	Serbia	13:24.54	
7	James West	Great Britain	13:24.80	
8	Morgan Le Guen	Switzerland	13:25.08	
9	Mahadi Abdi Ali	Netherlands	13:25.65	
10	John Heymans	Belgium	13:25.99	
11	Narve Gilje Nordås	Norway	13:26.91	SB
12	Emil Danielsson	Sweden	13:27.42	SB
13	Romain Legendre	France	13:29.15	
14	Brian Fay	Ireland	13:29.48	
15	Etienne Daguinos	France	13:30.06	
16	Jonas Raess	Switzerland	13:31.43	
17	Jack Rowe	Great Britain	13:31.77	
18	Mike Foppen	Netherlands	13:32.77	
19	Bastien Augusto	France	13:34.03	
20	Robin Hendrix	Belgium	13:36.19	
21	Per Svela	Norway	13:38.72	
22	Maximilian Thorwirth	Germany	13:41.29	
23	Florian Bremm	Germany	13:42.30	
24	Sergio Jiménez	Spain	13:43.44	
25	Henrik Ingebrigtsen	Norway	13:52.71	
26	Mohamed Abdilaahi	Germany	13:58.89	
27	Tim Verbaandert	Netherlands	14:01.18	SB
