= 2024 European Athletics Championships – Women's long jump =

Women's long jump at the 2024 European Athletics Championships
- Venue: Stadio Olimpico
- Location: Rome
- Dates: 11 June (qualification); 12 June (final)
- Competitors: 29 from 18 nations
- Winning distance: 7.22

Medalists
gold medal	Malaika Mihambo	Germany
silver medal	Larissa Iapichino	Italy
bronze medal	Agate de Sousa	Portugal

The women's long jump at the 2024 European Athletics Championships took place at the Stadio Olimpico on 11 and 12 June.

== Records ==
Standing records prior to the 2024 European Athletics Championships
World record	Galina Chistyakova (URS)	7.52 m	Leningrad, Soviet Union	11 June 1988
European record	Galina Chistyakova (URS)	7.52 m	Leningrad, Soviet Union	11 June 1988
Championship record	Heike Drechsler (GDR)	7.30 m	Split, Yugoslavia	28 August 1990
World Leading	Tara Davis-Woodhall (USA)	7.18 m	Albuquerque, United States	16 February 2024
Europe Leading	Malaika Mihambo (GER)	6.95 m	Berlin, Germany	23 February 2024

== Schedule ==
Date	Time	Round
11 June 2024	10:35	Qualification
12 June 2024	20:54	Final

All times are local times (UTC+2)

== Results ==
=== Qualification ===
Rank	Group	Name	Nationality	#1	#2	#3	Result	Note
1	B	Malaika Mihambo	Germany	7.03			7.03	Q, EL
2	B	Annik Kälin	Switzerland	x	6.83		6.83	Q
3	B	Hilary Kpatcha	France	6.61	6.82		6.82	Q, SB
4	A	Agate de Sousa	Portugal	6.72			6.72	Q
5	B	Alina Rotaru-Kottmann	Romania	6.63	5.08	6.71	6.71	Q, =SB
6	A	Plamena Mitkova	Bulgaria	6.42	6.52	6.71	6.71	Q, PB
7	A	Larissa Iapichino	Italy	6.71			6.71	Q
8	A	Fátima Diame	Spain	6.50	6.28	6.70	6.70	Q
9	B	Mikaelle Assani	Germany	6.67	x	r	6.67	q
10	A	Jogailė Petrokaitė	Lithuania	x	6.65	6.49	6.65	q, SB
11	A	Magdalena Bokun	Poland	6.65	x	x	6.65	q, SB
12	B	Filippa Kviten	Cyprus	6.37	6.57	6.63	6.63	q, SB
13	A	Pauline Hondema	Netherlands	x	6.17	6.63	6.63	SB
14	A	Maja Åskag	Sweden	6.20	6.60	6.52	6.60	SB
15	A	Florentina Iusco	Romania	x	6.58	x	6.58	
16	B	Tilde Johansson	Sweden	x	6.55	6.29	6.55	SB
17	A	Milica Gardašević	Serbia	6.55	x	x	6.55	
18	A	Neja Filipič	Slovenia	6.11	6.21	6.53	6.53	SB
19	B	Tessy Ebosele	Spain	6.47	6.37	6.37	6.47	
20	B	Petra Bánhidi-Farkas	Hungary	6.22	6.37	6.46	6.46	
21	B	Nikola Horowska	Poland	6.46	x	6.14	6.46	
22	A	Laura Raquel Müller	Germany	6.28	x	6.43	6.43	
23	A	Jessica Kähärä	Finland	x	6.39	6.18	6.39	
24	B	Oksana Mahlolovets	Ukraine	x	6.39	x	6.39	
25	A	Anasztázia Nguyen	Hungary	x	x	6.32	6.32	
26	B	Angelina Topić	Serbia	x	x	6.29	6.29	
27	A	Daniela Gubler	Switzerland	5.67	6.26	6.10	6.26	
	B	Evelise Veiga	Portugal	x	x	x	NM	
	B	Diana Lesti	Hungary	DNS				

=== Final ===
The tie between de Sousa and Assani was broken by second-best jump, with de Sousa's 6.87 metres beating Assani's 6.79 metres.

Rank	Name	Nationality	#1	#2	#3	#4	#5	#6	Result	Note
1st place, gold medalist(s)	Malaika Mihambo	Germany	6.70	7.22	x	–	7.04	6.54	7.22	WL
2nd place, silver medalist(s)	Larissa Iapichino	Italy	6.82	6.84	x	6.86	6.90	6.94	6.94	EU23L
3rd place, bronze medalist(s)	Agate de Sousa	Portugal	6.87	6.86	6.91	x	6.83	6.62	6.91	SB
4	Mikaelle Assani	Germany	6.79	6.67	6.91	6.60	x	6.71	6.91	
5	Hilary Kpatcha	France	6.67	6.63	6.88	6.32	6.46	6.65	6.88	=PB
6	Annik Kälin	Switzerland	6.45	6.68	6.82	x	6.62	x	6.82	
7	Plamena Mitkova	Bulgaria	x	6.80	x	6.62	x	x	6.80	PB
8	Fátima Diame	Spain	6.69	x	x	x	x	6.68	6.69	
9	Alina Rotaru-Kottmann	Romania	6.54	6.68	x				6.68	
10	Jogailė Petrokaitė	Lithuania	x	6.41	6.68				6.68	SB
11	Filippa Kviten	Cyprus	6.58	x	6.22				6.58	
12	Magdalena Bokun	Poland	x	x	6.38				6.38	
