= 2024 European Athletics Championships =

26th European Athletics Championships
- Dates: 7–12 June 2024
- Host city: Rome, Italy
- Venue: Stadio Olimpico
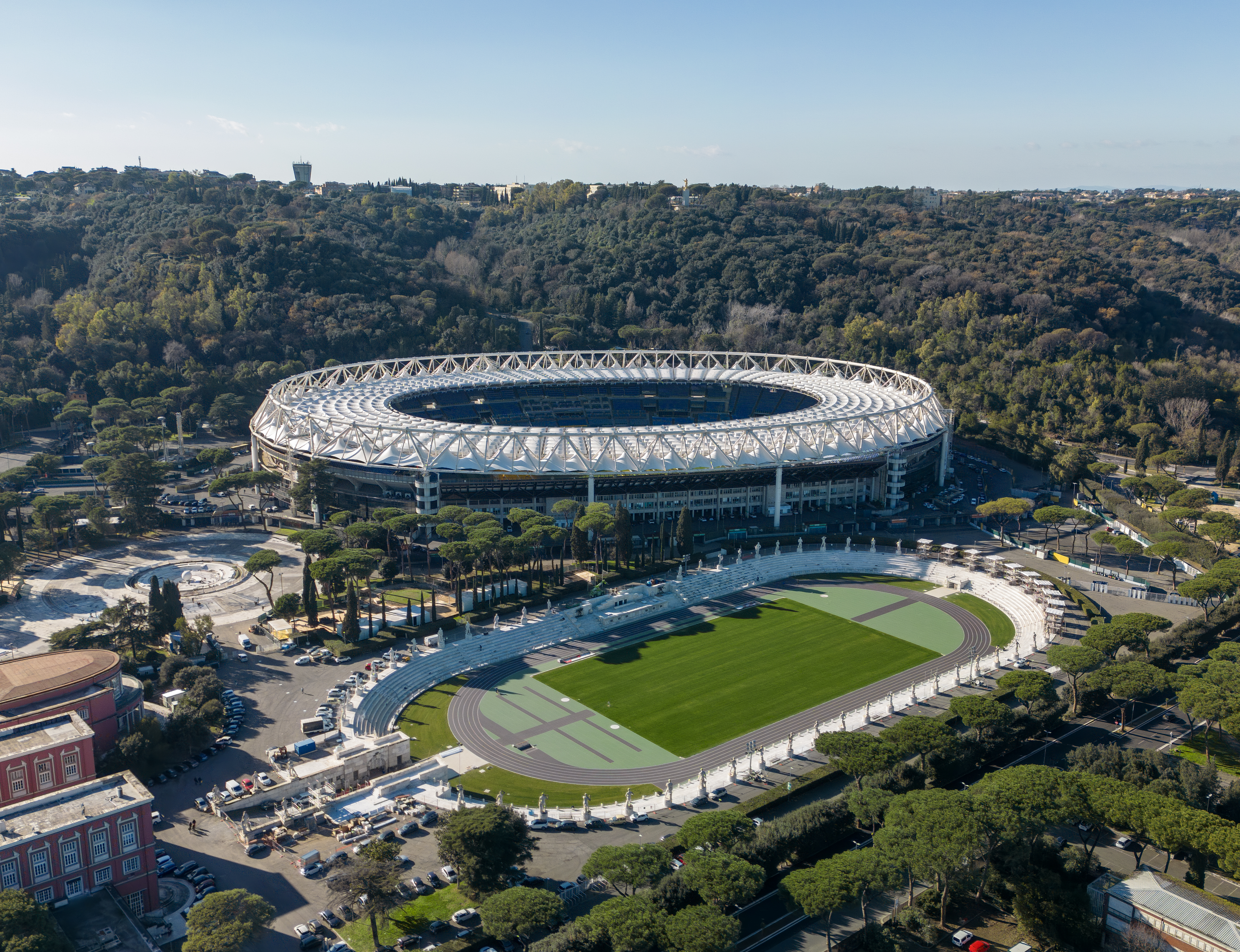
- Level: Senior
- Type: Outdoor
- Events: 49
- Official website: www.roma2024.eu

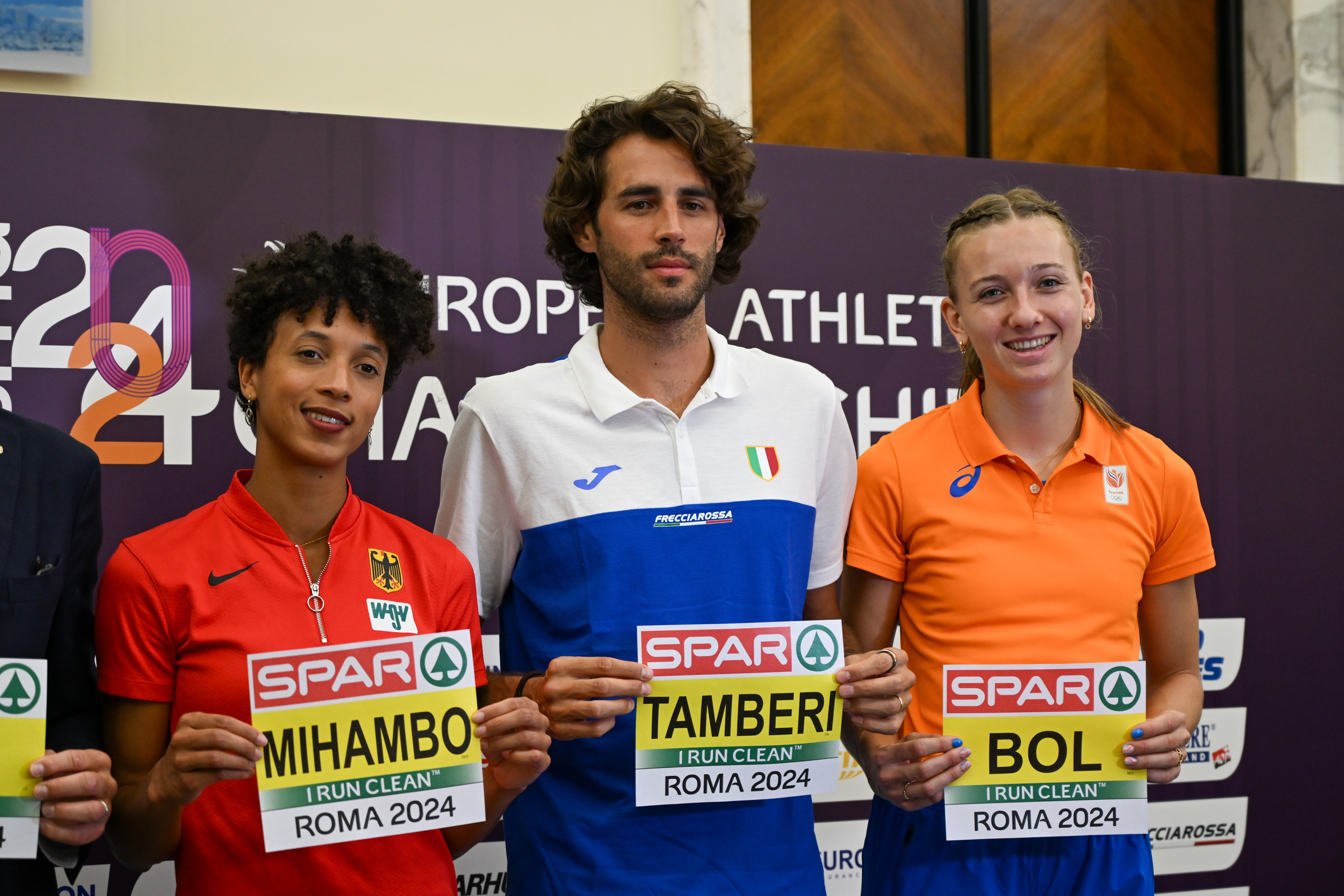
Eventual gold medalists Malaika Mihambo, Gianmarco Tamberi, and Femke Bol at the pre-championships press conference on 6 June 2024

The 26th European Athletics Championships were held from 7 to 12 June 2024 at the Stadio Olimpico in Rome, Italy.

It was the third time Italy staged this sporting event after the inaugural 1934 edition in Turin, for men only, and the 1974 edition at the Stadio Olimpico in Rome. Thus, the city and the venue hosted the event for the second time after 50 years. Stadio Olimpico staged also the 1960 Olympic Games and 1987 World Championships in Athletics. The venue was renovated in 1990 and holds up to 70,000 spectators.

On 10 November 2020, the European Athletic Association (EAA) chose Rome at its 160th Council Meeting held online due to the COVID-19 pandemic. The Italian capital was preferred to the city of Katowice in Poland.

== Schedule ==
All times were local (UTC+1).

Q	Qualification	H	Heats	S	Semi-finals	F	Final
M = morning session, E = evening session

Men's events per day
Date →	7 Jun		8 Jun			9 Jun		10 Jun		11 Jun		12 Jun
Event ↓	M	E	M	E		M	E	M	E	M	E	E
100 m		H		S	F							
200 m						H	S		F			
400 m			H				S		F			
800 m	H			S			F					
1500 m								H				F
5000 m				F								
10,000 m												F
Half marathon						F						
3000 m steeplechase			H						F			
110 m hurdles	H			S	F							
400 m hurdles						H		S			F	
High jump						Q					F	
Pole vault								Q				F
Long jump	Q			F								
Triple jump						Q					F	
Shot put		Q		F								
Discus throw	Q	F										
Hammer throw			Q				F					
Javelin throw										Q		F
Decathlon								F				
20 km walk				F								
4 × 100 m relay										H		F
4 × 400 m relay										H		F

Women's events per day
Date →	7 Jun		8 Jun			9 Jun			10 Jun		11 Jun		12 Jun
Event ↓	M	E	M	E		M	E		M	E	M	E	E
100 m			H				S	F					
200 m									H	S		F	
400 m			H				S			F			
800 m									H		S		F
1500 m	H						F						
5000 m		F											
10,000 m												F	
Half marathon						F							
3000 m steeplechase	H						F						
100 m hurdles	H			S	F								
400 m hurdles						H			S			F	
High jump		Q					F						
Pole vault			Q							F			
Long jump											Q		F
Triple jump	Q						F						
Shot put	Q	F											
Discus throw	Q			F									
Hammer throw						Q				F			
Javelin throw									Q			F	
Heptathlon	F												
20 km walk		F											
4 × 100 m relay											H		F
4 × 400 m relay											H		F

Mixed events per day
Date →	7 Jun		8 Jun		9 Jun		10 Jun		11 Jun		12 Jun
Event ↓	M	E	M	E	M	E	M	E	M	E	E
4 × 400 m relay		F									

== Results ==
=== Men ===
Event	Gold		Silver		Bronze	
100 metres	Marcell Jacobs; Italy (ITA)	10.02 SB	Chituru Ali; Italy (ITA)	10.05 PB	Romell Glave; Great Britain & N.I. (GBR)	10.06
200 metres	Timothé Mumenthaler; Switzerland (SUI)	20.28 EU23L	Filippo Tortu; Italy (ITA)	20.41	William Reais; Switzerland (SUI)	20.47
400 metres	Alexander Doom; Belgium (BEL)	44.15 CR	Charlie Dobson; Great Britain & N.I. (GBR)	44.38 PB	Liemarvin Bonevacia; Netherlands (NED)	44.88 SB, EM35R
800 metres	Gabriel Tual; France (FRA)	1:44.87	Mohamed Attaoui; Spain (ESP)	1:45.20	Catalin Tecuceanu; Italy (ITA)	1:45.40
1500 metres	Jakob Ingebrigtsen; Norway (NOR)	3:31.95 CR	Jochem Vermeulen; Belgium (BEL)	3:33.30 PB	Pietro Arese; Italy (ITA)	3:33.34
5000 metres	Jakob Ingebrigtsen; Norway (NOR)	13:20.11 SB	George Mills; Great Britain & N.I. (GBR)	13:21.38	Dominic Lokinyomo Lobalu; Switzerland (SUI)	13:21.61
10,000 metres	Dominic Lokinyomo Lobalu; Switzerland (SUI)	28:00.32	Yann Schrub; France (FRA)	28:00.48 SB	Thierry Ndikumwenayo; Spain (ESP)	28:00.96
Half marathon	Yemaneberhan Crippa; Italy (ITA)	1:01:03 CR	Pietro Riva; Italy (ITA)	1:01:04 SB	Amanal Petros; Germany (GER)	1:01:07
Half marathon	Italy	3:03:34	Israel	3:04:09	Germany	3:05:33
110 metres hurdles	Lorenzo Simonelli; Italy (ITA)	13.05 EL	Enrique Llopis; Spain (ESP)	13.16 PB	Jason Joseph; Switzerland (SUI)	13.43
400 metres hurdles	Karsten Warholm; Norway (NOR)	46.98 CR	Alessandro Sibilio; Italy (ITA)	47.50 NR	Carl Bengtström; Sweden (SWE)	47.94 NR
3000 metres steeplechase	Alexis Miellet; France (FRA)	8:14.01 PB	Djilali Bedrani; France (FRA)	8:14.36	Karl Bebendorf; Germany (GER)	8:14.41 PB
4 × 100 metres relay	Italy; Matteo Melluzzo; Marcell Jacobs; Lorenzo Patta; Filippo Tortu; Roberto Rigali*; Lorenzo Simonelli*	37.82 EL	Netherlands; Elvis Afrifa; Taymir Burnet; Xavi Mo-Ajok; Nsikak Ekpo	38.46	Germany; Kevin Kranz; Owen Ansah; Deniz Almas; Lucas Ansah-Peprah	38.52
4 × 400 metres relay	Belgium; Jonathan Sacoor; Robin Vanderbemden; Dylan Borlée; Alexander Doom; Florent Mabille*; Christian Iguacel*	2:59.84 EL	Italy; Luca Sito; Vladimir Aceti; Riccardo Meli; Edoardo Scotti; Brayan Lopez*	3:00.81 SB	Germany; Manuel Sanders; Jean Paul Bredau; Marc Koch; Emil Agyekum; Lukas Krappe*; Tyler Prenz*	3:00.82 SB
20 kilometres walk	Perseus Karlström; Sweden (SWE)	1:19:13	Paul McGrath; Spain (ESP)	1:19:31	Francesco Fortunato; Italy (ITA)	1:19:54 SB
High jump	Gianmarco Tamberi; Italy (ITA)	2.37 m CR	Vladyslav Lavskyy; Ukraine (UKR)	2.29 m PB	Oleh Doroshchuk; Ukraine (UKR)	2.26 m
Pole vault	Armand Duplantis; Sweden (SWE)	6.10 m CR	Emmanouil Karalis; Greece (GRE)	5.87 m PB	Ersu Şaşma; Turkey (TUR)	5.82 m =SB; 5.82 m SB
Pole vault	Armand Duplantis; Sweden (SWE)	6.10 m CR	Emmanouil Karalis; Greece (GRE)	5.87 m PB	Oleg Zernikel; Germany (GER)	5.82 m =SB; 5.82 m SB
Long jump	Miltiadis Tentoglou; Greece (GRE)	8.65 m CR	Mattia Furlani; Italy (ITA)	8.38 m WU20R	Simon Ehammer; Switzerland (SUI)	8.31 m
Triple jump	Jordan Díaz; Spain (ESP)	18.18 m CR	Pedro Pichardo; Portugal (POR)	18.04 m NR	Thomas Gogois; France (FRA)	17.38 m PB
Shot put	Leonardo Fabbri; Italy (ITA)	22.45 m CR	Filip Mihaljević; Croatia (CRO)	21.20 m	Michał Haratyk; Poland (POL)	20.94 m SB
Discus throw	Kristjan Čeh; Slovenia (SLO)	68.08 m	Lukas Weißhaidinger; Austria (AUT)	67.70 m	Mykolas Alekna; Lithuania (LTU)	67.48 m
Javelin throw	Jakub Vadlejch; Czech Republic (CZE)	88.65 SB	Julian Weber; Germany (GER)	85.94 m	Oliver Helander; Finland (FIN)	85.75 m SB
Hammer throw	Wojciech Nowicki; Poland (POL)	80.95 m SB	Bence Halász; Hungary (HUN)	80.49 m SB	Mykhaylo Kokhan; Ukraine (UKR)	80.18 m
Decathlon	Johannes Erm; Estonia (EST)	8764 PB	Sander Skotheim; Norway (NOR)	8635 PB	Makenson Gletty; France (FRA)	8604 PB
WR world record | ER European record | CR championship record | NR national record | WL world leading | EL European leading | PB personal best | SB seasonal best

=== Women ===
Event	Gold		Silver		Bronze	
100 metres	Dina Asher-Smith; Great Britain & N.I. (GBR)	10.99	Ewa Swoboda; Poland (POL)	11.03	Zaynab Dosso; Italy (ITA)	11.03
200 metres	Mujinga Kambundji; Switzerland (SUI)	22.49	Daryll Neita; Great Britain & N.I. (GBR)	22.50	Hélène Parisot; France (FRA)	22.63 PB
400 metres	Natalia Kaczmarek; Poland (POL)	48.98 EL, NR	Rhasidat Adeleke; Ireland (IRL)	49.07 EU23L, NR	Lieke Klaver; Netherlands (NED)	50.08 SB
800 metres	Keely Hodgkinson; Great Britain & N.I. (GBR)	1:58.65	Gabriela Gajanová; Slovakia (SVK)	1:58.79 SB	Anaïs Bourgoin; France (FRA)	1:59.30
1500 metres	Ciara Mageean; Ireland (IRL)	4:04.66	Georgia Bell; Great Britain & N.I. (GBR)	4:05.33	Agathe Guillemot; France (FRA)	4:05.69
5000 metres	Nadia Battocletti; Italy (ITA)	14:35.29 CR	Karoline Bjerkeli Grøvdal; Norway (NOR)	14:38.62 PB	Marta García; Spain (ESP)	14:44.04 NR
10,000 metres	Nadia Battocletti; Italy (ITA)	30:51.32 NR	Diane van Es; Netherlands (NED)	30:57.24 PB	Megan Keith; Great Britain & N.I. (GBR)	31:04.77
Half marathon	Karoline Bjerkeli Grøvdal; Norway (NOR)	1:08:09 CR	Joan Chelimo; Romania (ROM)	1:08:55	Calli Hauger-Thackery; Great Britain & N.I. (GBR)	1:08:58
Half marathon	Great Britain & N.I.	3:29:01	Germany	3:31:59	Spain	3:33:16
100 metres hurdles	Cyréna Samba-Mayela; France (FRA)	12.31 CR	Ditaji Kambundji; Switzerland (SUI)	12.40 EU23R	Pia Skrzyszowska; Poland (POL)	12.42 PB
400 metres hurdles	Femke Bol; Netherlands (NED)	52.49 CR	Louise Maraval; France (FRA)	54.23 PB	Cathelijn Peeters; Netherlands (NED)	54.37
3000 metres steeplechase	Alice Finot; France (FRA)	9:16.22	Gesa Felicitas Krause; Germany (GER)	9:18.06	Elizabeth Bird; Great Britain & N.I. (GBR)	9:18.39 SB
4 × 100 metres relay	Great Britain & N.I. Dina Asher-Smith; Desirèe Henry; Amy Hunt; Daryll Neita; Asha Philip*	41.91 EL	France; Orlann Oliere; Gémima Joseph; Hélène Parisot; Sarah Richard; Maroussia Paré*	42.15 SB	Netherlands; Nadine Visser; Marije van Hunenstijn; Minke Bisschops; Tasa Jiya	42.46
4 × 400 metres relay	Netherlands; Lieke Klaver; Cathelijn Peeters; Lisanne de Witte; Femke Bol; Eveline Saalberg*; Anne van de Wiel*; Myrte van der Schoot*	3:22.39 EL	Ireland; Sophie Becker; Rhasidat Adeleke; Phil Healy; Sharlene Mawdsley; Lauren Cadden*	3:22.71 NR	Belgium; Naomi Van den Broeck; Imke Vervaet; Cynthia Bolingo; Helena Ponette; Camille Laus*	3:22.95 SB
20 kilometres walk	Antonella Palmisano; Italy (ITA)	1:28:08	Valentina Trapletti; Italy (ITA)	1:28:37 PB	Lyudmyla Olyanovska; Ukraine (UKR)	1:28:48 SB
High jump	Yaroslava Mahuchikh; Ukraine (UKR)	2.01 m	Angelina Topić; Serbia (SRB)	1.97 m	Iryna Herashchenko; Ukraine (UKR)	1.95 m =SB
Pole vault	Angelica Moser; Switzerland (SUI)	4.78 m =NR	Katerina Stefanidi; Greece (GRE)	4.73 m SB	Molly Caudery; Great Britain & N.I. (GBR)	4.73 m
Long jump	Malaika Mihambo; Germany (GER)	7.22 m WL	Larissa Iapichino; Italy (ITA)	6.94 m EU23L	Agate de Sousa; Portugal (POR)	6.91 m SB
Triple jump	Ana Peleteiro; Spain (ESP)	14.85 m =EL	Tuğba Danışmaz; Turkey (TUR)	14.57 m NR	Ilionis Guillaume; France (FRA)	14.43 m PB
Shot put	Jessica Schilder; Netherlands (NED)	18.77 m	Jorinde van Klinken; Netherlands (NED)	18.67 m SB	Yemisi Ogunleye; Germany (GER)	18.62 m
Discus throw	Sandra Elkasević; Croatia (CRO)	67.04 m SB	Jorinde van Klinken; Netherlands (NED)	65.99 m SB	Liliana Cá; Portugal (POR)	64.53 m
Javelin throw	Victoria Hudson; Austria (AUT)	64.62 m	Adriana Vilagoš; Serbia (SRB)	64.42 m EU23L	Marie-Therese Obst; Norway (NOR)	63.50 m PB
Hammer throw	Sara Fantini; Italy (ITA)	74.18 m SB	Anita Włodarczyk; Poland (POL)	72.92 m SB	Rose Loga; France (FRA)	72.68 m PB
Heptathlon	Nafissatou Thiam; Belgium (BEL)	6848 CR	Auriana Lazraq-Khlass; France (FRA)	6635 PB	Noor Vidts; Belgium (BEL)	6596 PB
WR world record | ER European record | CR championship record | NR national record | WL world leading | EL European leading | PB personal best | SB seasonal best

=== Mixed ===
Event	Gold		Silver		Bronze	
4 × 400 metres relay	Ireland; Christopher O'Donnell; Rhasidat Adeleke; Thomas Barr; Sharlene Mawdsley	3:09.92 CR	Italy; Luca Sito; Anna Polinari; Edoardo Scotti; Alice Mangione	3:10.69 NR	Netherlands; Liemarvin Bonevacia; Lieke Klaver; Isaya Klein Ikkink; Femke Bol	3:10.73 SB

== Medal table ==
* Host nation (Italy)

Rank	Nation	Gold	Silver	Bronze	Total
1	Italy*	11	9	4	24
2	France	4	5	7	16
3	Great Britain & N.I.	4	4	5	13
4	Norway	4	2	1	7
5	Switzerland	4	1	4	9
6	Netherlands	3	4	5	12
7	Belgium	3	1	2	6
8	Spain	2	3	3	8
9	Poland	2	2	2	6
10	Ireland	2	2	0	4
11	Sweden	2	0	1	3
12	Germany	1	3	7	11
13	Greece	1	2	0	3
14	Ukraine	1	1	4	6
15	Austria	1	1	0	2
15	Croatia	1	1	0	2
17	Czech Republic	1	0	0	1
17	Estonia	1	0	0	1
17	Slovenia	1	0	0	1
20	Serbia	0	2	0	2
21	Portugal	0	1	2	3
22	Turkey	0	1	1	2
23	Hungary	0	1	0	1
23	Israel	0	1	0	1
23	Romania	0	1	0	1
23	Slovakia	0	1	0	1
27	Finland	0	0	1	1
27	Lithuania	0	0	1	1
Totals (28 entries)		49	49	50	148

== Placing table ==
After 49 of 49 events

Rank	Nation	1st		2nd		3rd		4th		5th		6th		7th		8th		Total
Rank	Nation	Pl	Pts	Pl	Pts	Pl	Pts	Pl	Pts	Pl	Pts	Pl	Pts	Pl	Pts	Pl	Pts	Total
1	Italy	11	88	9	63	4	24	2	10	4	16	8	21	3	6	4	4	232
2	France	4	32	5	35	7	42	5	24.50	9	36	4	11.50	4	8	4	4	193
3	Germany	1	8	3	21	7	41.50	7	35	8	32	5	14.50	3	6	5	5	163
4	Great Britain	4	32	4	28	5	30	3	15	2	8	4	11.50	6	12	2	2	138.50
5	Spain	2	16	3	21	3	18	6	29.50	6	24	4	12	2	4	3	3	127.50
6	Netherlands	3	24	4	28	5	30	1	5	3	12	0	0	1	2	2	2	103
7	Switzerland	4	32	1	7	4	24	1	5	1	4	1	3	2	4	4	4	83
8	Belgium	3	24	1	7	2	12	3	25	1	4	2	6	0	0	1	1	79
9	Norway	4	32	2	14	1	6	1	5	0	0	2	6	1	2	2	2	67
10	Poland	2	16	2	14	2	12	0	0	0	0	5	13	4	8	2	2	65
11	Sweden	2	16	0	0	1	6	4	20	1	4	2	6	0	0	1	1	53
12	Czech Republic	1	8	0	0	0	0	3	14.50	3	12	2	6	1	2	0	0	42.50
13	Finland	0	0	0	0	1	6	2	9.50	3	12	3	9	1	2	2	2	40.50
14	Ukraine	1	8	1	7	4	24	0	0	0	0	0	0	0	0	1	1	40
15	Portugal	0	0	1	7	2	12	2	10	0	0	1	3	1	2	2	2	36
16	Ireland	2	16	2	14	0	0	0	0	0	0	0	0	2	4	1	1	35
17	Romania	0	0	1	7	0	0	2	10	2	8	1	3	1	2	0	0	30
18	Greece	1	8	2	14	0	0	0	0	0	0	1	3	1	2	1	1	28
19	Austria	1	8	1	7	0	0	0	0	0	0	1	3	1	2	0	0	20
20	Bulgaria	0	0	0	0	0	0	2	10	0	0	3	7.50	1	2	0	0	19.50
21	Israel	0	0	1	7	0	0	1	5	0	0	0	0	3	6	0	0	18
22	Croatia	1	8	1	7	0	0	0	0	0	0	0	0	0	0	2	2	17
23	Serbia	0	0	2	14	0	0	0	0	0	1	3	0	0	0	0	0	17
24	Turkey	0	0	1	7	1	5.50	0	0	1	4	0	0	0	0	0	0	16.50
25	Slovenia	1	8	0	0	0	0	0	0	1	4	0	0	2	4	0	0	16
26	Estonia	1	8	0	0	0	0	1	5	0	0	0	0	0	0	0	0	13
27	Lithuania	0	0	0	0	1	6	1	5	0	0	0	0	1	2	0	0	13
28	Hungary	0	0	1	7	0	0	0	0	0	0	1	3	0	0	2	2	12
29	Denmark	0	0	0	0	0	0	0	0	1	4	1	3	0	0	0	0	9
30	Slovakia	0	0	1	7	0	0	0	0	0	0	0	0	0	0	1	1	8
31	Luxembourg	0	0	0	0	0	0	1	5	0	0	1	3	0	0	0	0	8
32	Latvia	0	0	0	0	0	0	0	0	0	0	0	0	2	4	1	1	5
33	Albania	0	0	0	0	0	0	0	0	1	4	0	0	0	0	0	0	4
34	Moldova	0	0	0	0	0	0	0	0	0	0	1	3	0	0	0	0	3
34	Andorra	0	0	0	0	0	0	0	0	0	0	0	0	1	2	0	0	2

== Participating nations ==
1559 athletes, 761 females and 798 males, from 48 countries are expected to participate. As a result of the 2022 Russian invasion of Ukraine, athletes from Russia and Belarus were banned from competing at the 2024 European Championships.

- Albania (2)
- Andorra (1)
- Armenia (2)
- Austria (22)
- Azerbaijan (4)
- Belgium (59)
- Bosnia and Herzegovina (2)
- Bulgaria (10)
- Croatia (17)
- Cyprus (9)
- Czech Republic (52)
- Denmark (26)
- Estonia (19)
- Finland (67)
- France (101)
- Georgia (2)
- Germany (112)
- Gibraltar (1)
- Great Britain & N.I. (71)
- Greece (53)
- Hungary (58)
- Iceland (8)
- Ireland (41)
- Israel (19)
- Italy (116)
- Kosovo (2)
- Latvia (12)
- Lithuania (23)
- Luxembourg (6)
- Malta (2)
- Moldova (6)
- Monaco (1)
- Montenegro (3)
- Netherlands (60)
- North Macedonia (2)
- Norway (51)
- Poland (94)
- Portugal (49)
- Romania (23)
- San Marino (2)
- Serbia (16)
- Slovakia (17)
- Slovenia (24)
- Spain (86)
- Sweden (60)
- Switzerland (60)
- Turkey (44)
- Ukraine (46)
