= Ireland at the 2022 European Athletics Championships =

- Flag of Ireland
- WA code: IRL
- National federation: Athletics Ireland

in Munich, Germany 15 August 2022 – 21 August 2022
- Competitors: 32 (18 men and 14 women) in 21 events
- Medals Ranked 25th: Gold 0 Silver 1 Bronze 1 Total 2

European Athletics Championships appearances
- 1946; 1950; 1954; 1958; 1962; 1966; 1969; 1971; 1974; 1978; 1982; 1986; 1990; 1994; 1998; 2002; 2006; 2010; 2012; 2014; 2016; 2018; 2022; 2024; 2026

Ireland competed at the 2022 European Athletics Championships in Munich, Germany, between 15 and 21 August 2022

== Medallists ==
Medal	Name	Event	Date
Silver	Ciara Mageean	Women's 1500 metres	19 August
Bronze	Mark English	Men's 800 metres	21 August

== Results ==
Ireland entered the following athletes.

Key

- Q = Qualified for the next round
- q = Qualified for the next round as a fastest loser or, in field events, by position without achieving the qualifying target
- NR = National record
- PB = Personal best
- SB = Season best
- N/A = Round not applicable for the event

=== Men ===
Track and road events

Athlete	Event	Heat		Semifinal		Final	
Athlete	Event	Result	Rank	Result	Rank	Result	Rank
Israel Olatunde	100 m	10.19 PB	1 Q	10.20	11 Q	10.17 NR	6
Marcus Lawler	200 m	21.10	20	did not advance			
Christopher O'Donnell	400 m	Bye		45.73	11	did not advance	
Mark English	800 m	1:47.54	10 Q	1:46.66	3 Q	1:45.19	3rd place, bronze medalist(s)
John Fitzsimons	800 m	1:48.22	26	did not advance			
Andrew Coscoran	1500 m	3:38.74	8 q	—N/a		3:39.91	9
Luke McCann	1500 m	3:40.98	18	—N/a		did not advance	
Brian Fay	5000 m	—N/a				13:31.87	8
Darragh McElhinney	5000 m	—N/a				13:39.11	16
Efrem Gidey	10,000 m	—N/a				27:59.22 PB	6
Hiko Tonosa Haso	10,000 m	—N/a				28:38.82	18
Hugh Armstrong	Marathon	—N/a				2:25:27	58
Thomas Barr	400 m hurdles	49.49	4 Q	49.30	7	did not advance	
Brendan Boyce	35 km walk	—N/a				2:38:03	10
Israel Olatunde; Mark Smyth; Colin Doyle; Joseph Ojewumi	4 × 100 m relay	did not finish		—N/a		did not advance	

Field events

Athlete	Event	Qualification		Final	
Athlete	Event	Distance	Position	Distance	Position
Eric Favors	Shot put	19.71	15	did not advance	

=== Women ===
Track and road events

Athlete	Event	Heat		Semifinal		Final	
Athlete	Event	Result	Rank	Result	Rank	Result	Rank
Sharlene Mawdsley	400 m	52.63	15	did not advance			
Phil Healy	400 m	53.10	19	did not advance			
Rhasidat Adeleke	400 m	Bye		51.08	7 q	50.53 NR	5
Louise Shanahan	800 m	2:02.80	12 Q	2:01.15	8 Q	2:01.64	8
Ciara Mageean	1500 m	4:03.03 SB	2 Q	—N/a		4:02.56 SB	2nd place, silver medalist(s)
Sarah Healy	1500 m	4:07.78	22	—N/a		did not advance	
Roisin Flanagan	5000 m	—N/a				15:33.72	14
Fionnuala McCormack	Marathon	—N/a				2:29:25 SB	7
Ann Marie McGlynn	Marathon	—N/a				2:38:26 SB	29
Aoife Cooke	Marathon	—N/a				2:40:37 SB	34
Fionnuala McCormack; Ann Marie McGlynn; Aoife Cooke	Marathon Cup	—N/a				7:48:28	5
Sarah Lavin	100 m hurdles	Bye		12.79 PB	6 q	12.86	5
Michelle Finn	3000 m steeplechase	9:49.85	15 q	—N/a		9:47.57	14
Eilish Flanagan	3000 m steeplechase	10:00.72	24	—N/a		did not advance	
Sophie Becker; Phil Healy; Rhasidat Adeleke; Sharlene Mawdsley	4 × 400 m relay	3:26.06 NR	5 Q	—N/a		3:26.63	6

Combined events – Heptathlon

Athlete	Event	100H	HJ	SP	200 m	LJ	JT	800 m	Final	Rank
Kate O'Connor	Result	DNS							Did not start	
Kate O'Connor	Points	DNS							Did not start	
