= Ireland at the 2024 European Athletics Championships =

- Flag of Ireland
- WA code: IRL
- National federation: Athletics Ireland

in Rome, Italy 7 June 2024 – 12 June 2024
- Competitors: 37 (20 men and 17 women)
- Medals Ranked 10th: Gold 2 Silver 2 Bronze 0 Total 4

European Athletics Championships appearances
- 1946; 1950; 1954; 1958; 1962; 1966; 1969; 1971; 1974; 1978; 1982; 1986; 1990; 1994; 1998; 2002; 2006; 2010; 2012; 2014; 2016; 2018; 2022; 2024; 2026

Ireland competed at the 2024 European Athletics Championships in Rome, Italy, between 7 and 12 June 2024. Ireland achieved its best ever result winning two gold and two silver medals.

== Medallists ==
Medal	Name	Event	Date
Gold	Christopher O'Donnell; Rhasidat Adeleke; Thomas Barr; Sharlene Mawdsley	Mixed 4 × 400 metres relay	7 June
Gold	Ciara Mageean	Women's 1500 metres	9 June
Silver	Rhasidat Adeleke	Women's 400 metres	10 June
Silver	Sophie Becker; Rhasidat Adeleke; Phil Healy; Sharlene Mawdsley	Women's 4x400 meters relay	12 June

== Results ==
Ireland entered the following athletes.

Key

- Q = Qualified for the next round
- q = Qualified for the next round as a fastest loser or, in field events, by position without achieving the qualifying target
- NR = National record
- PB = Personal best
- SB = Season best
- N/A = Round not applicable for the event

=== Men ===
Track and road events

Athlete	Event	Heat		Semifinal		Final	
Athlete	Event	Result	Rank	Result	Rank	Result	Rank
Israel Olatunde	100 m	10.31 SB	8 Q	10.40	19	did not advance	
Mark Smyth	200 m	20.93 SB	12	20.86 SB	16	did not advance	
Christopher O'Donnell	400 m	45.69 SB	9	DQ		did not advance	
Mark English	800 m	1:46.73	25	did not advance			
Andrew Coscoran	1,500 m	3:38.52	5 Q	—N/a		3:34.76	13
Nicholas Griggs	1,500 m	3:46.66	28	—N/a		did not advance	
Brian Fay	5,000 m	—N/a				13:29.48	14
Brian Fay	10,000 m	—N/a				28:40.53	27
Cormac Dalton	10,000 m	—N/a				29:15.30 SB	35
Efrem Gidey	10,000 m	—N/a				28:16.94	12
Barry Keane	10,000 m	—N/a				28:53.34	31
Peter Lynch	10,000 m	—N/a				29:02.00	32
Hiko Tonosa Haso	Half Marathon	—N/a				1:05:42	43
Thomas Barr	400 m hurdles	49.31 SB	1 q	49.61	16	did not advance	
Oisin Lane	20 km walk	—N/a				1:25:02	23
Toluwabori Akinola; Mark Smyth; Colin Doyle; Israel Olatunde	4 × 100 m relay	39.34 SB	13	—N/a		did not advance	
Jack Rafferty; Christopher O'Donnell; Sean Doggett; Callum Baird	4 × 400 m relay	3:04.41 SB	11	—N/a		did not advance	

Field events

Athlete	Event	Qualification		Final	
Athlete	Event	Distance	Position	Distance	Position
Eric Favors	Shot put	19.60	14	did not advance	

=== Women ===
Track and road events

Athlete	Event	Heat		Semifinal		Final	
Athlete	Event	Result	Rank	Result	Rank	Result	Rank
Phil Healy	200 m	23.51	15	did not advance			
Rhasidat Adeleke	400 m	Bye		50.54	1 Q	49.07 NR	2nd place, silver medalist(s)
Sharlene Mawdsley	400 m	Bye		50.99	5 Q	51.59	8
Sophie Becker	400 m	Bye		51.54	10	did not advance	
Louise Shanahan	800 m	2:04.81	28	did not advance			
Ciara Mageean	1500 m	4:06.81	3 Q	—N/a		4:04.66	1st place, gold medalist(s)
Sarah Healy	1500 m	4:12.30	14	—N/a		4:06.77	7
Jodie McCann	5,000 m	—N/a				15:29.25 PB	17
Anika Thompson	10,000 m	—N/a				33:19.42	20
Laura Mooney	10,000 m	—N/a				34:03.94	26
Shona Heaslip	Half Marathon	—N/a				1:12:19 SB	34
Emily Haggard-Kearney	Half Marathon	—N/a				1:17:04 SB	64
Michelle Finn	3,000 m Steeplechase	9:46.93 SB	24	did not advance			
Sarah Lavin	100 m hurdles	Bye		12.73 SB	4 Q	12.94	7
Kelly McGrory	400 m hurdles	57.10 PB	10	did not advance			
Sophie Becker; Phil Healy; Lauren Cadden; Sharlene Mawdsley Rhasidat Adeleke	4 × 400 m relay	3:24.82	1 Q	—N/a		3.22.71 NR	2nd place, silver medalist(s)

Field events

Athlete	Event	Qualification		Final	
Athlete	Event	Distance	Position	Distance	Position
Nicoa Tuthill	Hammer throw	69.85	7 q	69.09	9

=== Mixed ===
Track and road events

Athlete	Event	Heat		Semifinal		Final	
Athlete	Event	Result	Rank	Result	Rank	Result	Rank
Christopher O'Donnell; Rhasidat Adeleke; Thomas Barr; Sharlene Mawdsley	4 × 400 m relay	—N/a				3:09.92 CR	1st place, gold medalist(s)
