= Ireland at the 2022 European Championships =

in (Germany) Munich 11 August 2022 – 22 August 2022
- Competitors: 88 in 7 sports
- Medals Ranked 26th: Gold 1 Silver 2 Bronze 1 Total 4

European Championships appearances
- 2018; 2022

Ireland competed at the 2022 European Championships in Munich from August 11 to August 22, 2022, winning four medals.

== Medalists ==
Medal	Name	Sport	Event	Date
Gold	Fintan McCarthy; Paul O'Donovan	Rowing	Men's lightweight double sculls	14 August
Silver	Natalie Long; Aifric Keogh; Tara Hanlon; Eimear Lambe	Rowing	Women's coxless four	13 August
Silver	Ciara Mageean	Athletics	Women's 1500 metres	19 August
Bronze	Mark English	Athletics	Men's 800 metres	21 August

== Competitors ==
The following is the list of number of competitors in the Championships:

Sport	Men	Women	Total
Athletics	20	18	38
Gymnastics (men and women)	5	5	10
Canoe sprint	1	1	2
Cycling BMX	1	0	1
Cycling road	6	3	9
Cycling track	0	6	6
Rowing	9	13	22
Total	42	46	88

== Athletics ==
Ireland entered the following athletes.

Key

- Q = Qualified for the next round
- q = Qualified for the next round as a fastest loser or, in field events, by position without achieving the qualifying target
- NR = National record
- PB = Personal best
- SB = Season best
- N/A = Round not applicable for the event

=== Men ===
Track and road events

Athlete	Event	Heat		Semifinal		Final	
Athlete	Event	Result	Rank	Result	Rank	Result	Rank
Israel Olatunde	100 m	10.19 PB	1 Q	10.20	11 Q	10.17 NR	6
Marcus Lawler	200 m	21.10	20	did not advance			
Christopher O'Donnell	400 m	Bye		45.73	11	did not advance	
Mark English	800 m	1:47.54	10 Q	1:46.66	3 Q	1:45.19	3rd place, bronze medalist(s)
John Fitzsimons	800 m	1:48.22	26	did not advance			
Andrew Coscoran	1500 m	3:38.74	8 q	—		3:39.91	9
Luke McCann	1500 m	3:40.98	18	—		did not advance	
Brian Fay	5000 m	—				13:31.87	8
Darragh McElhinney	5000 m	—				13:39.11	16
Efrem Gidey	10,000 m	—				27:59.22 PB	6
Hiko Tonosa Haso	10,000 m	—				28:38.82	18
Hugh Armstrong	Marathon	—				2:25:27	58
Thomas Barr	400 m hurdles	49.49	4 Q	49.30	7	did not advance	
Brendan Boyce	35 km walk	—				2:38:03	10
Israel Olatunde; Mark Smyth; Colin Doyle; Joseph Ojewumi	4 × 100 m relay	did not finish		—		did not advance	

Field events

Athlete	Event	Qualification		Final	
Athlete	Event	Distance	Position	Distance	Position
Eric Favors	Shot put	19.71	15	did not advance	

=== Women ===
Track and road events

Athlete	Event	Heat		Semifinal		Final	
Athlete	Event	Result	Rank	Result	Rank	Result	Rank
Sharlene Mawdsley	400 m	52.63	15	did not advance			
Phil Healy	400 m	53.10	19	did not advance			
Rhasidat Adeleke	400 m	Bye		51.08	7 q	50.53 NR	5
Louise Shanahan	800 m	2:02.80	12 Q	2:01.15	8 Q	2:01.64	8
Ciara Mageean	1500 m	4:03.03 SB	2 Q	—		4:02.56 SB	2nd place, silver medalist(s)
Sarah Healy	1500 m	4:07.78	22	—		did not advance	
Roisin Flanagan	5000 m	—				15:33.72	14
Fionnuala McCormack	Marathon	—				2:29:25 SB	7
Ann Marie McGlynn	Marathon	—				2:38:26 SB	29
Aoife Cooke	Marathon	—				2:40:37 SB	34
Fionnuala McCormack; Ann Marie McGlynn; Aoife Cooke	Marathon Cup	—				7:48:28	5
Sarah Lavin	100 m hurdles	Bye		12.79 PB	6 q	12.86	5
Michelle Finn	3000 m steeplechase	9:49.85	15 q	—		9:47.57	14
Eilish Flanagan	3000 m steeplechase	10:00.72	24	—		did not advance	
Sophie Becker; Phil Healy; Rhasidat Adeleke; Sharlene Mawdsley	4 × 400 m relay	3:26.06 NR	5 Q	—		3:26.63	6

Combined events – Heptathlon

Athlete	Event	100H	HJ	SP	200 m	LJ	JT	800 m	Final	Rank
Kate O'Connor	Result	DNS							Did not start	
Kate O'Connor	Points	DNS							Did not start	

== Canoeing ==
Men

Athlete	Event	Heats		Semifinals		Final	
Athlete	Event	Time	Rank	Time	Rank	Time	Rank
Patrick O'Leary	VL3 200 m	1:03.838	5 SF	50.531	4	Did not advance	

Women

Athlete	Event	Heats		Semifinals		Final	
Athlete	Event	Time	Rank	Time	Rank	Time	Rank
Jennifer Egan-Simmons	K-1 500 m	2:01.205	7 SF	1:59.338	9	Did not advance	
Jennifer Egan-Simmons	K-1 5000 m	—				23:32.833	6

== Cycling ==
=== Road ===
Men

Athlete	Event	Time	Rank
Sam Bennett	Road race	4:38:49	5
Edward Dunbar	Road race	4:40:34	90
Ben Healy	Time trial	28:01.56	6
Ryan Mullen	Road race	4:39:35	72
Matthew Teggart	Road race	4:42:20	108
Rory Townsend	Road race	4:39:07	40

Women

Athlete	Event	Time	Rank
Kelly Murphy	Time trial	33:25.84	15
Jo Patterson	Time trial	33:32.56	17
Alice Sharpe	Road race	2:59:30	29

=== Track ===
Elimination race

Athlete	Event	Final
Athlete	Event	Rank
Alice Sharpe	Women's elimination race	11

Keirin

Athlete	Event	1st Round	Repechage	2nd Round	Final
Athlete	Event	Rank	Rank	Rank	Rank
Orla Walsh	Women's keirin	4 R	2 SF	6 F7-12	12

Madison

Athlete	Event	Final	
Athlete	Event	Points	Rank
Mia Griffin; Lara Gillespie	Women's madison	−40	9

Omnium

Athlete	Event	Qualification		Scratch Race		Tempo Race		Elimination Race		Points Race		Total points	Rank
Athlete	Event	Rank	Points	Rank	Points	Rank	Points	Rank	Points	Rank	Points	Total points	Rank
Emily Kay	Women's omnium	—		3	36	7	28	9	24	11	25	113	10

Points race

Athlete	Event	Final	
Athlete	Event	Points	Rank
Mia Griffin	Women's points race	7	9

== Gymnastics ==
Ireland has entered five male and five female athletes.

=== Men ===
Qualification

Athlete	Event	Qualification								Final							
Athlete	Event	Apparatus						Total	Rank	Apparatus						Total	Rank
Athlete	Event	F	PH	R	V	PB	HB	Total	Rank	F	PH	R	V	PB	HB	Total	Rank
Dominick Cunningham	Team															—	
Daniel Fox	Team															—	
Ewan McAteer	Team															—	
Rhys McClenaghan	Team															—	
Eamon Montgomery	Team															—	
Total	Team																

=== Women ===
Qualification

Athlete	Event	Qualification						Final					
Athlete	Event	Apparatus				Total	Rank	Apparatus				Total	Rank
Athlete	Event	V	UB	BB	F	Total	Rank	V	UB	BB	F	Total	Rank
Blathnaid Higgins	Team											—	
Halle Hilton	Team											—	
Kate Molloy	Team											—	
Emily Moorhead	Team											—	
Emma Slevin	Team											—	
Total	Team												

== Rowing ==
Men

Athlete	Event	Heats		Repechage		Semifinals		Final	
Athlete	Event	Time	Rank	Time	Rank	Time	Rank	Time	Rank
Fintan McCarthy; Paul O'Donovan	Lightweight double sculls	07:02.52	1	Bye		Bye		06.34.72	1st place, gold medalist(s)

Women

Athlete	Event	Heats		Repechage		Semifinals		Final	
Athlete	Event	Time	Rank	Time	Rank	Time	Rank	Time	Rank
Sanita Pušpure; Zoe Hyde	Double sculls	07:47.02	2	—		DNS		—	
Emily Hegarty; Fiona Murtagh	Coxless pair					—			
Natalie Long; Aifric Keogh; Tara Hanlon; Eimear Lambe	Coxless four	7:10.24	1	—				6:52.99	2nd place, silver medalist(s)
Zoe Hyde; Natalie Long; Tara Hanlon; Sanita Pušpure; Aifric Keogh; Fiona Murtagh; Emily Hegarty; Eimear Lambe; Leah O'Regan	Eight					—			
Aoife Casey	Lightweight single sculls					—			
Lydia Heaphy; Margaret Cremen	Lightweight double sculls								

Mixed

Athlete	Event	Heats		Final	
Athlete	Event	Time	Rank	Time	Rank
Katie O'Brien; Steven McGowan	PR2 double sculls				
