= Ireland at the 2026 European Athletics Championships =

- Flag of Ireland
- WA code: IRL

in Birmingham, United Kingdom 10–16 August 2026
- Competitors: 55 (30 men and 25 women)
- Medals Ranked 9th: Gold 2 Silver 1 Bronze 1 Total 4

European Athletics Championships appearances
- 1946; 1950; 1954; 1958; 1962; 1966; 1969; 1971; 1974; 1978; 1982; 1986; 1990; 1994; 1998; 2002; 2006; 2010; 2012; 2014; 2016; 2018; 2022; 2024; 2026

Ireland competed at the 2026 European Athletics Championships in Birmingham, United Kingdom from 10–16 August 2026.

== Medallists ==
Medal	Name	Event	Date
Gold	Mark English	Men's 800 metres	13 August
Gold	Kate O'Connor	Women's heptathlon	15 August
Silver	Rhasidat Adeleke	Women's 200 metres	13 August
Bronze	Andrew Coscoran	Men's 1500 metres	15 August

== Results ==
Ireland entered the following athletes.

Key

- Q = Qualified for the next round
- q = Qualified for the next round as a fastest loser or, in field events, by position without achieving the qualifying target
- NR = National record
- PB = Personal best
- SB = Season best
- N/A = Round not applicable for the event

Track and road events
Men

Athlete	Event	Heat		Semifinal		Final	
Athlete	Event	Result	Rank	Result	Rank	Result	Rank
Bori Akinola	100 m	10.39	1 q	10.38	4	Did Not Advance	
Israel Olatunde	100 m	Bye		10.49	7	Did Not Advance	
Sean Aigboboh	200 m	Bye		20.46	4	Did Not Advance	
Marcus Lawler	200 m	20.94	11 q	21.11	8	Did Not Advance	
Jack Raftery	400 m	45.81	2 q	45.81	7	Did Not Advance	
Mark English	800 m	1:46.96	1 Q	1:43.49 CR	1 Q	1:45.26	1st place, gold medalist(s)
Cian McPhillips	800 m	1:46.84	7	Did Not Advance			
Andrew Coscoran	1500 m	3:41.86	3 Q	—N/a		3:36.24	3rd place, bronze medalist(s)
Cathal Doyle	1500 m	4:36.28	15	—N/a		Did not advance	
Brian Fay	5000 m	—N/a				13:31.15	14
Nick Griggs	5000 m	—N/a				13:21.07	8
Darragh McElhinney	5000 m	—N/a				13:37.62	18
Jack O'Leary	10,000 m	—N/a				28:24.89	10
Ryan Creech	Marathon	—N/a				DNS	
David McGlynn	Marathon	—N/a				DNF	
Paul O'Donnell	Marathon	—N/a				2:20:41	43
David Kenny	Half marathon walk	—N/a				1:24:49 PB	6
Oisin Lane	Half marathon walk	—N/a				1:27:09 PB	11
Bori Akinola; Sean Aigboboh; Marcus Lawler; Israel Olatunde	4 × 100 m relay	39.13 SB	4 q	—N/a		40.26	7
Andrew Egan; Jack Raftery; Joe Doody; Sean Doggett	4 × 400 m relay	3:01.76 SB	5	—N/a		Did not advance	

Women

Athlete	Event	Heat		Semifinal		Final	
Athlete	Event	Result	Rank	Result	Rank	Result	Rank
Ciara Neville	100 m	11.29	5 q	11.57	8	Did Not Advance	
Lauren Roy	100 m	11.32	7	Did Not Advance			
Rhasidat Adeleke	200 m	Bye		22.43	1 Q	22.28 NR	2nd place, silver medalist(s)
Lauren Roy	200 m	23.20	6 q	23.16	4	Did Not Advance	
Sophie Becker	400 m	52.28 SB	13 q	52.47	8	Did not advance	
Sharlene Mawdsley	400 m	Withdrew		Did Not Advance			
Sarah Healy	1500 m	4:08.12	2 Q	—N/a		4:10.76	5
Jodie McCann	1500 m	4:14.63	13	—N/a		Did not advance	
Sophie O'Sullivan	1500 m	4:08.88	5 Q	—N/a		4:11.72	8
Sarah Healy	5000 m	—N/a				15:40.95	4
Niamh Allen	10,000 m	—N/a				DNF	
Fiona Everard	10,000 m	—N/a				33:08.60	20
Fionnuala McCormack	Marathon	—N/a				DNF	
Sarah Lavin	100 m hurdles	13.07	6	Did Not Advance			
Abbie Sheridan	3000 m steeplechase	9:57.50	14	—N/a		Did Not Advance	
Lucy-May Sleeman; Ciara Neville; Sarah Leahy; Lauren Roy	4 × 100 m relay	43.13 NR	4 q	—N/a		44.18	7
Sophie Becker; Jenna Breen; Cliodhna Manning; Arlene Crossan	4 × 400 m relay	3:32.58	8	—N/a		Did not advance	

Field events

Athlete	Event	Qualification		Final	
Athlete	Event	Result	Rank	Result	Rank
Eric Favors	Men's shot put	19.54	12 q	19.79	10
Nicola Tuthill	Women's hammer throw	70.09	8 q	70.33	5

Combined events – Heptathlon

Athlete	Event	100H	HJ	SP	200 m	LJ	JT	800 m	Final	Rank
Kate O'Connor	Result	13.30 PB	1.86 =PB	13.96	23.79*	6.55 PB	50.16	2:11.74	6751 NR	1st place, gold medalist(s)
Kate O'Connor	Points	1080	1054	791	1001	1023	863	939	6751 NR	1st place, gold medalist(s)

*Not Wind Legal
