= Ireland at the 2016 European Athletics Championships =

- WA code: IRL
- National federation: AAI
- Website: www.athleticsireland.ie

in Amsterdam
- Competitors: 44 (22 men and 22 women) in 24 events
- Medals Ranked 27th: Gold 0 Silver 0 Bronze 1 Total 1

European Athletics Championships appearances
- 1946; 1950; 1954; 1958; 1962; 1966; 1969; 1971; 1974; 1978; 1982; 1986; 1990; 1994; 1998; 2002; 2006; 2010; 2012; 2014; 2016; 2018; 2022; 2024; 2026

Ireland competed at the 2016 European Athletics Championships in Amsterdam, Netherlands, between 6 and 10 July 2016. A delegation of 55 athletes was sent to represent the country.

== Medals ==
Medal	Name	Event	Date
Bronze	Ciara Mageean	Women's 1500 metres	10 July

== Results ==
Men

Track & road events

Athlete	Event	Heat		Semifinal		Final	
Athlete	Event	Result	Rank	Result	Rank	Result	Rank
Marcus Lawler	200 m	21.06	=13 q	21.33	21	Did not advance	
David Gillick	400 m	47.81	22	Did not advance			
Brian Gregan	400 m	47.02	11 q	46.37	19	Did not advance	
Craig Lynch	400 m	47.61	20	Did not advance			
Karl Griffin	800 m	1:49.37 SB	13	Did not advance			
Declan Murray	800 m	1:50.10	20	Did not advance			
Eoin Everard	1500 m	3:45.46	28	—N/a		Did not advance	
Kevin Batt	5000 m	—N/a				14:20.50	17
Ben Reynolds	110 m hurdles	13.87	=14	Did not advance			
Thomas Barr	400 m hurdles	50.17 SB	2 Q	50.09 SB	17	Did not advance	
Paul Byrne	400 m hurdles	53.12	24	Did not advance			
Tomas Cotter	3000 m steeplechase	9:08.82	23	—N/a		Did not advance	
Jonathon Browning; Marcus Lawler; Eanna Madden; Jason Smyth	4 × 100 m relay	39.52 SB	13	—N/a		Did not advance	
Thomas Barr; David Gillick; Brian Gregan; Craig Lynch	4 × 400 m relay	3:04.42	8 q	—N/a		3:04.32 SB	5
Sergiu Ciobanu	Half marathon	—N/a				1:07:46	57
Mick Clohisey	Half marathon	—N/a				1:06:00	32
Mark Hanrahan	Half marathon	—N/a				DNF	
Gary Murray	Half marathon	—N/a				DNF	
Paul Pollock	Half marathon	—N/a				1:04:58	17
Kevin Seaward	Half marathon	—N/a				1:06:20	34
Irish team	Half marathon	—N/a				3:17:18	7

Field Events

Athlete	Event	Qualification		Final	
Athlete	Event	Distance	Rank	Distance	Rank
Barry Pender	High jump	2.14	22	Did not advance	

Women

Track & road events

Athlete	Event	Heat		Semifinal		Final	
Athlete	Event	Result	Rank	Result	Rank	Result	Rank
Amy Foster	100 m	11.57	13 Q	11.62	=17	Did not advance	
Sinead Denny	400 m	53.95	11 Q	53.27	21	Did not advance	
Claire Mooney	400 m	55.66	18	Did not advance			
Siofra Cleirigh Büttner	800 m	2:04.97	23	—N/a		Did not advance	
Ciara Mageean	1500 m	4:13.61	12 Q	—N/a		4:33.78	3rd place, bronze medalist(s)
Deirdre Byrne	5000 m	—N/a				15:53.67	10
Mary Cullen	5000 m	—N/a				DNS	
Tara Jameson	10000 m	—N/a				33:19.85	14
Fionnuala McCormack	10000 m	—N/a				31:30.74 SB	4
Christine McMahon	400 m hurdles	57.73	13 q	56.87	15	Did not advance	
Michele Finn	3000 m steeplechase	9:45.93 SB	4 Q	—N/a		9:43.19 PB	7
Kerry O'Flaherty	3000 m steeplechase	9:45.53	8 q	—N/a		9:45.88	12
Sara Louise Treacy	3000 m steeplechase	9:42.16 SB	5 Q	—N/a		9:45.19	9
Joan Healy; Phil Healy; Sarah Murray; Niamh Whelan	4 × 100 m relay	44.29 SB	12	—N/a		Did not advance	
Jenna Bromell; Sinead Denny; Phil Healy; Ciara McCallion	4 × 400 m relay	3:34.02 SB	15	—N/a		Did not advance	
Gladys Ganiel O'Neill	Half marathon	—N/a				1:18:06 SB	71
Claire McCarthy	Half marathon	—N/a				1:16:02	48

Field Events

Athlete	Event	Qualification		Final	
Athlete	Event	Distance	Rank	Distance	Rank
Tori Pena	Pole vault	4.35	=15	Did not advance	
