= Ireland at the 2018 European Athletics Championships =

- WA code: IRL
- National federation: Athletics Ireland
- Website: www.athleticsireland.ie

in Berlin
- Competitors: 33 (17 men and 16 women) in 20 events
- Medals: Gold 0 Silver 0 Bronze 1 Total 1

European Athletics Championships appearances
- 1946; 1950; 1954; 1958; 1962; 1966; 1969; 1971; 1974; 1978; 1982; 1986; 1990; 1994; 1998; 2002; 2006; 2010; 2012; 2014; 2016; 2018; 2022; 2024; 2026

Ireland competed at the 2018 European Athletics Championships in Berlin, Germany, from 6–12 August 2018.

== Medals ==
Medal	Name	Event	Date
Bronze	Thomas Barr	400 m hurdles	9 August

== Results ==
=== Men ===
Track & road events

Athlete	Event	Heat		Semifinal		Final	
Athlete	Event	Result	Rank	Result	Rank	Result	Rank
Leon Reid	200 m	Bye		20.38	2 Q	20.37	7
Marcus Lawler	200 m	20.80	5	Did not advance			
Christopher O'Donnell	400 m	46.81	6	Did not advance			
Zak Curran	800 m	1:49.31	7	Did not advance			
Mark English	800 m	1:48.98	6	Did not advance			
Stephen Scullion	10000 m	—N/a				29:46.87	23
Thomas Barr	400 m hurdles	Bye		49.10	2 Q	48.31	3rd place, bronze medalist(s)
Alex Wright	20 km walk	—N/a				1:22:18	10
Cian McManamon	20 km walk	—N/a				1:25:43	21
Brendan Boyce	50 km walk	—N/a				4:02:14	19
Sergiu Ciobanu	Marathon	—N/a				2:19:49	36
Mick Clohisey	Marathon	—N/a				2:18:00	18
Sean Hehir	Marathon	—N/a				2:18:58	25
Paul Pollock	Marathon	—N/a				2:23:26	47
Kevin Seaward	Marathon	—N/a				2:16:58	15
Team	Marathon	—N/a				6:53:55	6
Christopher O'Donnell; Brandon Arrey; Leon Reid; Thomas Barr	4 × 400 m relay	3:06.55	5	Did not advance			

Field Events

Athlete	Event	Qualification		Final	
Athlete	Event	Distance	Rank	Distance	Rank
Adam McMullen	Long jump	7.47	13	Did not advance	

=== Women ===
Track & road events

Athlete	Event	Heat		Semifinal		Final	
Athlete	Event	Result	Rank	Result	Rank	Result	Rank
Phil Healy	100 m	11.44	2 Q	11.46	7	Did not advance	
Gina Akpe-Moses	100 m	11.63	5	Did not advance			
Phil Healy	200 m	23.34	3 Q	23.23	4	Did not advance	
Síofra Cléirigh Büttner	800 m	2:02.80	6	Did not advance			
Claire Mooney	800 m	2:04.26	7	Did not advance			
Ciara Mageean	1500 m	4:09.35	2 Q	—N/a		4:04.63	4
Emma Mitchell	10000 m	—N/a				34:08.61	17
Kerry O'Flaherty	3000 m steeplechase	10:09.81	17	Did not advance			
Michelle Finn	3000 m steeplechase	10:10.93	16	Did not advance			
Breege Connolly	Marathon	—N/a				2:41:53	31
Gladys Ganiel O'Neill	Marathon	—N/a				2:42:42	33
Lizzie Lee	Marathon	—N/a				2:40:12	29
Team	Marathon	—N/a				8:04:46	8
Joan Healy; Phil Healy; Ciara Neville; Gina Akpe-Moses	4 × 100 m relay	43.80 NR	4	Did not advance			
Sinead Denny; Sophie Becker; Davicia Patterson; Claire Mooney	4 × 400 m relay	3:35.96	8	Did not advance			

Key

- Q = Qualified for the next round
- q = Qualified for the next round as a fastest loser or, in field events, by position without achieving the qualifying target
- N/A = Round not applicable for the event
- Bye = Athlete not required to compete in round
