= Christopher O'Donnell =

Christopher O'Donnell may refer to:

- Chris O'Donnell (born 1970), American actor
- Christopher O'Donnell (athlete) (born 1998), Irish track and field athlete
