= Andrew Liskowitz =

American athlete

Personal information
- Full name: Andrew Joseph Liskowitz
- Born: May 22, 1997 (age 29) Middletown, New Jersey, U.S.
- Height: 6 ft 2 in (188 cm)
- Weight: 220 lb (100 kg)

Sport
- Country: United States
- Sport: Track and field
- Event: Shot put
- College team: Michigan Wolverines (2015–2021)
- Coached by: Jerry Clayton

Achievements and titles
- Personal best: 21.18 m (69 ft 5 3/4 in) (2019, outdoor)
Medal record
Men's track and field
Representing the United States
Universiade
Silver medal – second place	2019 Naples	Shot put

Andrew Liskowitz (born May 22, 1997) is a French-American athlete competing primarily in the shot put. He finished in sixth place at the 2020 United States Olympic Trials (track and field) in June 2021. Liskowitz finished with the second-farthest throw ever at Olympic Trials by a collegiate athlete and the number 20 throw in U.S. Olympic Trials history. He is a six-time All American, three-time Big Ten Champion, World University Games silver medalist, and holds the University of Michigan school records for the indoor and outdoor shot put throws.

He won the silver medal in the shot put at the 2019 World University Games in Naples, Italy (2019 Summer Universiade), gold at the 2021 outdoor Big Ten Conference Championships, gold at the 2020 indoor Big Ten Conference Championships, gold at the 2019 indoor Big Ten Conference Championships, and bronze at the 2017, 2018, and 2019 Big Ten Conference outdoor Championships. He defeated Joe Kovacs, the reigning Olympic silver medalist of the 2016 Rio de Janeiro Olympics and 2020 Tokyo Olympics, in 2019. He has a personal best of 21.18 metres In 2016, Liskowitz placed fourth at the USATF U20 Outdoor Championships in Clovis, California.

According to other throwers and photos, Liskowitz is left-handed; though he was taught the shot put with his right hand, and therefore, competes with his non-dominant hand.

Andrew Liskowitz was born in Morristown, New Jersey. He grew up along the Jersey Shore in Middletown Township and attended Christian Brothers Academy in Lincroft. He is the son of Michael and Renée Liskowitz. He has a twin sister, Olivia, and one brother, Christian. His sister was a member of the Syracuse University rowing (sport) team.

Prior to attending university, Liskowitz played competitive ice hockey, baseball, and basketball. Throughout his prep career, Liskowitz broke the 35-year-old school record in the discus throw at Christian Brothers Academy. In 2015, he placed third among New Jersey high school track athletes in the shot put and fourth in the discus throw.

He is a member of Critical Mass Training in Shrewsbury, New Jersey. The gym is also home to throwers such as Nick Vena and Jonathan Kalnas.

He joined the University of Michigan track team as a walk-on. In 2017, his freshman year, he placed third in the Big Ten Outdoor Track Championships, earning the rank of #1 Freshman in the NCAA. In the years after walking onto the team, he earned a scholarship and developed into an All-American.

Liskowitz is coached by Jerry Clayton at the University of Michigan. He has won the Big Ten Championship three times, each in the shot put throw. He finished the 2020 Indoor season ranked #1 in the NCAA, but the 2020 NCAA Championships were cancelled due to COVID-19. Throughout his career, he has broken his own university record several times.

Jerry Clayton has coached two Olympic medalists, two world champions, 16 individual NCAA champions, and 105 All-Americans.

At the 2020 United States Olympic Trials (track and field), Liskowitz placed sixth. Though this did not earn him a bid to the 2020 Olympics, it was the best throw ever by a 6th place finisher, the second farthest throw by a collegian in Trials history, and the number 20 throw in Olympic Trials history.
