= Ireland at the 2018 European Championships =

- WA code: IRL

in (United Kingdom) Glasgow (Germany) Berlin 2 August 2018 – 12 August 2018
- Competitors: 80
- Medals Ranked 23rd: Gold 1 Silver 1 Bronze 2 Total 4

European Championships appearances
- 2018; 2022

Ireland is one of the nations competing at the inaugural 2018 European Championships in Berlin, Germany and Glasgow, United Kingdom, from 2 to 12 August 2018. Ireland is competing in 7 sports.

== Medallists ==
Medal	Name	Sport	Event	Date
Gold	Rhys McClenaghan	Gymnastics	Pommel horse	12 August
Silver	Gary O'Donovan; Paul O'Donovan	Rowing	Lightweight men's double sculls (LM2x)	5 August
Bronze	Shane Ryan	Swimming	Men's 50m backstroke	4 August
Bronze	Thomas Barr	Athletics	Men's 400m hurdles	9 August

Medals by sport
Sport	1st place, gold medalist(s)	2nd place, silver medalist(s)	3rd place, bronze medalist(s)	Total
Aquatics	0	0	1	1
Athletics	0	0	1	1
Gymnastics	1	0	0	1
Rowing	0	1	0	1
Total	1	1	2	4

Medals by date
Day	Date	1st place, gold medalist(s)	2nd place, silver medalist(s)	3rd place, bronze medalist(s)	Total
3	4 August	0	0	1	1
4	5 August	0	1	0	1
8	9 August	0	0	1	1
11	12 August	1	0	0	1
Total		1	1	2	4

Medals by gender
Gender	1st place, gold medalist(s)	2nd place, silver medalist(s)	3rd place, bronze medalist(s)	Total
Male	1	1	2	4
Female	0	0	0	0
Total	1	1	2	4

== See also ==
- Ireland at the 2018 European Athletics Championships
