= 2024 European Athletics Championships – Women's 400 metres =

Women's 400 metres at the 2024 European Athletics Championships
- Venue: Stadio Olimpico
- Location: Rome, Italy
- Dates: 8 June 2024 (round 1); 9 June 2024 (semifinals); 10 June 2024 (final)
- Competitors: 31 from 19 nations
- Winning time: 48.98 s NR

Medalists
gold medal	Natalia Kaczmarek	Poland
silver medal	Rhasidat Adeleke	Ireland
bronze medal	Lieke Klaver	Netherlands

The women's 400 metres at the 2024 European Athletics Championships took place at the Stadio Olimpico in Rome, Italy from 8 to 10 June 2024.

== Background ==
Records before the 2024 European Athletics Championships
Record	Athlete (nation)	Time	Location	Date
World record	Marita Koch (GDR)	47.60	Canberra, Australia	6 October 1985
European record	Marita Koch (GDR)	47.60	Canberra, Australia	6 October 1985
Championship record	Marita Koch (GDR)	48.16	Athens, Greece	8 September 1982
World leading	Femke Bol (NED)	49.17 sh	Glasgow, United Kingdom	2 March 2024
Europe leading	Femke Bol (NED)	49.17 sh	Glasgow, United Kingdom	2 March 2024

== Schedule ==
Date	Time	Round
8 June 2024	12:20	Round 1
9 June 2024	20:05	Semifinals
10 June 2024	21:50	Final

All times are local times (UTC+2)

== Results ==
=== Round 1 ===
The 12 highest ranked athletes received a bye into the semifinals. The other athletes competed in round 1 and the 12 fastest (q) advanced to the semifinals.

Results of round 1
Rank	Heat	Lane	Athlete	Nation	Time	Notes
1	1	6	Amandine Brossier	France	51.30	q, SB
2	2	8	Lurdes Gloria Manuel	Czech Republic	51.36	q
3	2	5	Alice Mangione	Italy	51.71	q, SB
4	2	3	Berta Segura	Spain	51.92	q, PB
5	3	3	Tereza Petržilková	Czech Republic	51.96	q
6	2	9	Justyna Święty-Ersetic	Poland	52.01	q
7	3	8	Anna Polinari	Italy	52.06	q
8	2	7	Maryana Shostak	Ukraine	52.07	q, PB
9	1	7	Iga Baumgart-Witan	Poland	52.18	q SB
10	2	6	Lisa Lilja	Sweden	52.18	q PB
11	1	4	Giancarla Trevisan	Italy	52.22	q, SB
12	2	4	Giulia Senn	Switzerland	52.24	q
13	1	8	Julia Niederberger	Switzerland	52.42	SB, R
14	1	9	Cátia Azevedo	Portugal	52.53	
15	3	4	Helena Ponette	Belgium	52.57	R
16	3	6	Astri Ertzgaard	Norway	52.78	R
17	3	7	Mette Baas	Finland	52.94	
18	3	5	Maja Ćirić	Serbia	52.96	
19	1	5	Kateryna Karpiuk	Ukraine	53.06	
20	3	9	Tetyana Melnyk	Ukraine	54.06	

=== Semifinals ===
The first 2 in each heat (Q) and the next 2 fastest (q) advance to the final.

Results of the semifinals
Rank	Heat	Lane	Athlete	Nation	Time	Notes
1	1	8	Rhasidat Adeleke*	Ireland	50.54	Q, EU23L
2	3	7	Lieke Klaver*	Netherlands	50.57	Q
3	2	8	Natalia Kaczmarek*	Poland	50.70	Q
4	1	5	Lavai Nielsen*	Great Britain & N.I.	50.73	Q, PB
5	3	8	Sharlene Mawdsley*	Ireland	50.99	Q
6	1	7	Lurdes Gloria Manuel	Czech Republic	51.06	q, NU20R
7	2	5	Andrea Miklós*	Romania	51.13	Q
8	2	6	Susanne Gogl-Walli*	Austria	51.14	q, SB
9	3	9	Alice Mangione	Italy	51.34	PB
10	2	7	Sophie Becker*	Ireland	51.54	
11	3	5	Helena Ponette	Belgium	51.65	
12	1	9	Amandine Brossier	France	51.78	
13	3	2	Maryana Shostak	Ukraine	51.99	PB
14	2	9	Tereza Petržilková	Czech Republic	52.05	
15	3	6	Victoria Ohuruogu*	Great Britain & N.I.	52.07	
16	3	4	Giulia Senn	Switzerland	52.16	SB
17	3	3	Justyna Święty-Ersetic	Poland	52.18	
18	2	4	Anna Polinari	Italy	52.53	
19	2	3	Berta Segura	Spain	52.53	
20	2	2	Lisa Lilja	Sweden	52.55	
21	1	2	Giancarla Trevisan	Italy	52.59	
22	1	3	Astri Ertzgaard	Norway	52.82	
23	1	6	Modesta Justè Morauskaité*	Lithuania	52.95	
24	1	4	Julia Niederberger	Switzerland	52.97	
	1		Iga Baumgart-Witan	Poland	DNS	

*Athletes who received a bye to the semifinals

=== Final ===
The final took place on 10 June at 21:50.

Results of the final
Rank	Lane	Athlete	Nation	Time	Notes
1st place, gold medalist(s)	7	Natalia Kaczmarek	Poland	48.98	EL, NR
2nd place, silver medalist(s)	6	Rhasidat Adeleke	Ireland	49.07	EU23L, NR
3rd place, bronze medalist(s)	8	Lieke Klaver	Netherlands	50.08	SB
4	3	Lurdes Gloria Manuel	Czech Republic	50.52	WU20L
5	9	Andrea Miklós	Romania	50.71	SB
6	5	Laviai Nielsen	Great Britain & N.I.	50.71	PB
7	2	Susanne Gogl-Walli	Austria	51.23	
8	4	Sharlene Mawdsley	Ireland	51.59	
