= 2022 European Athletics Championships – Women's 4 × 400 metres relay =

Women's 4 × 400 metres relay at the 2022 European Athletics Championships
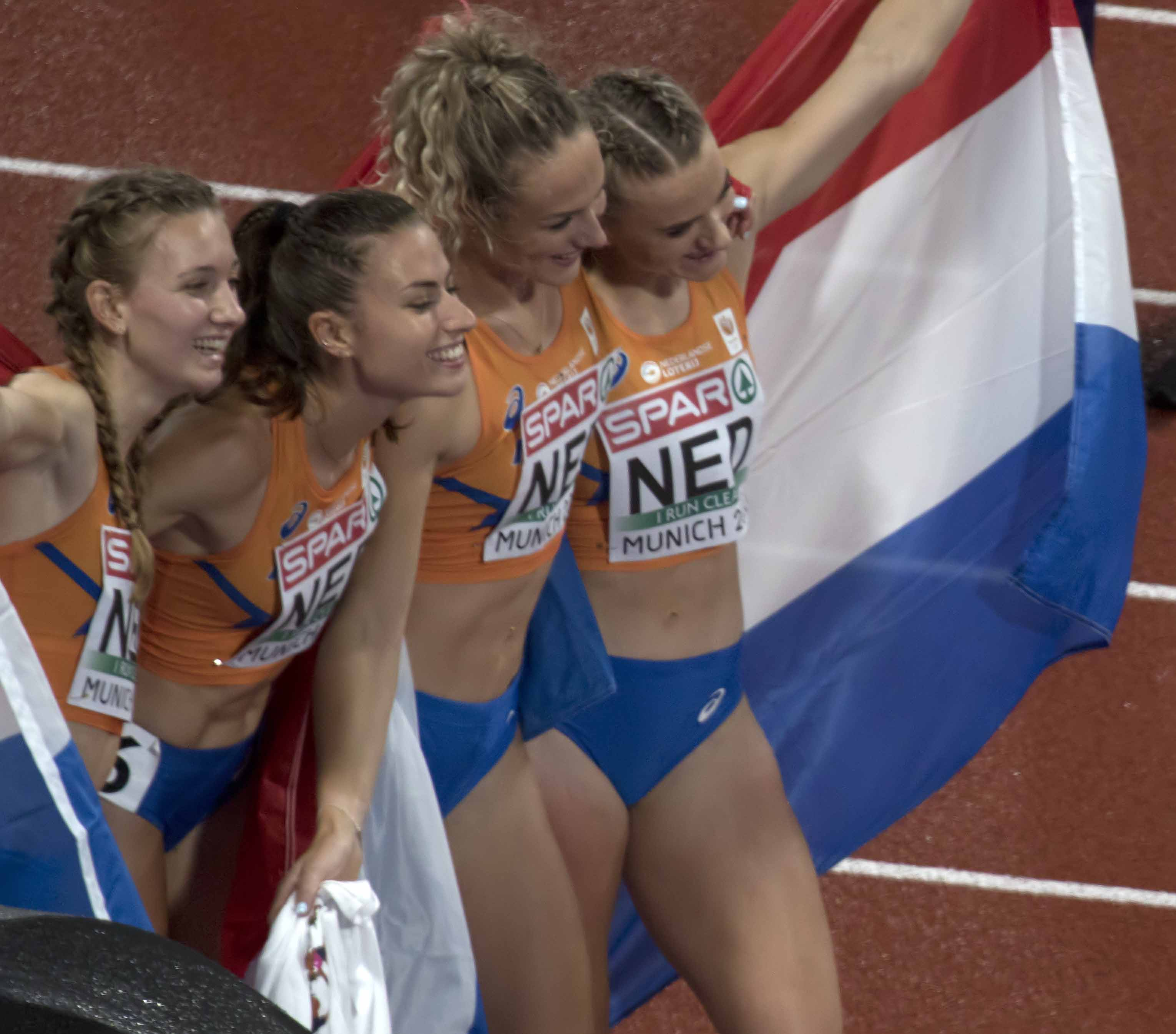
- Femke Bol, Eveline Saalberg, Lieke Klaver, and Lisanne de Witte of the Netherlands after winning the final
- Venue: Olympiastadion
- Location: Munich, Germany
- Dates: 19 August 2022 (round 1); 20 August 2022 (final)
- Teams: 16 nations
- Winning time: 3:20.87 min NR

Medalists
| gold medal | Eveline Saalberg; Lieke Klaver; Lisanne de Witte; Femke Bol; Andrea Bouma (Note: This athlete competed in round 1, but was replaced in the final.); Laura de Witte | Netherlands |
| silver medal | Anna Kiełbasińska; Iga Baumgart-Witan; Justyna Święty-Ersetic; Natalia Kaczmarek; Kinga Gacka; Małgorzata Hołub-Kowalik | Poland |
| bronze medal | Victoria Ohuruogu; Ama Pipi; Jodie Williams; Nicole Yeargin; Zoey Clark; Laviai Nielsen | Great Britain and Northern Ireland |

The women's 4 × 400 metres relay at the 2022 European Athletics Championships was held over two rounds at the Olympiastadion in Munich, Germany, on 19 and 20 August 2022. It was the seventeenth time that the event was contested at the European Athletics Championships. Sixteen national teams were allocated a place to compete in this relay.

In round 1 on 19 August, eight out of the sixteen teams advanced to the next round, the Czech team was disqualified for obstruction during the handover, and the Irish team set a national record of 3:26.06 minutes. In the final on 20 August, the team of the Netherlands won in a national record of 3:20.87 min, followed by the team of Poland in 3:21.68 min in second place and the team of Great Britain and Northern Ireland in 3:21.74 min in third place. Outside the medals, the Belgian team set a national record of 3:22.12 min.

== Background ==
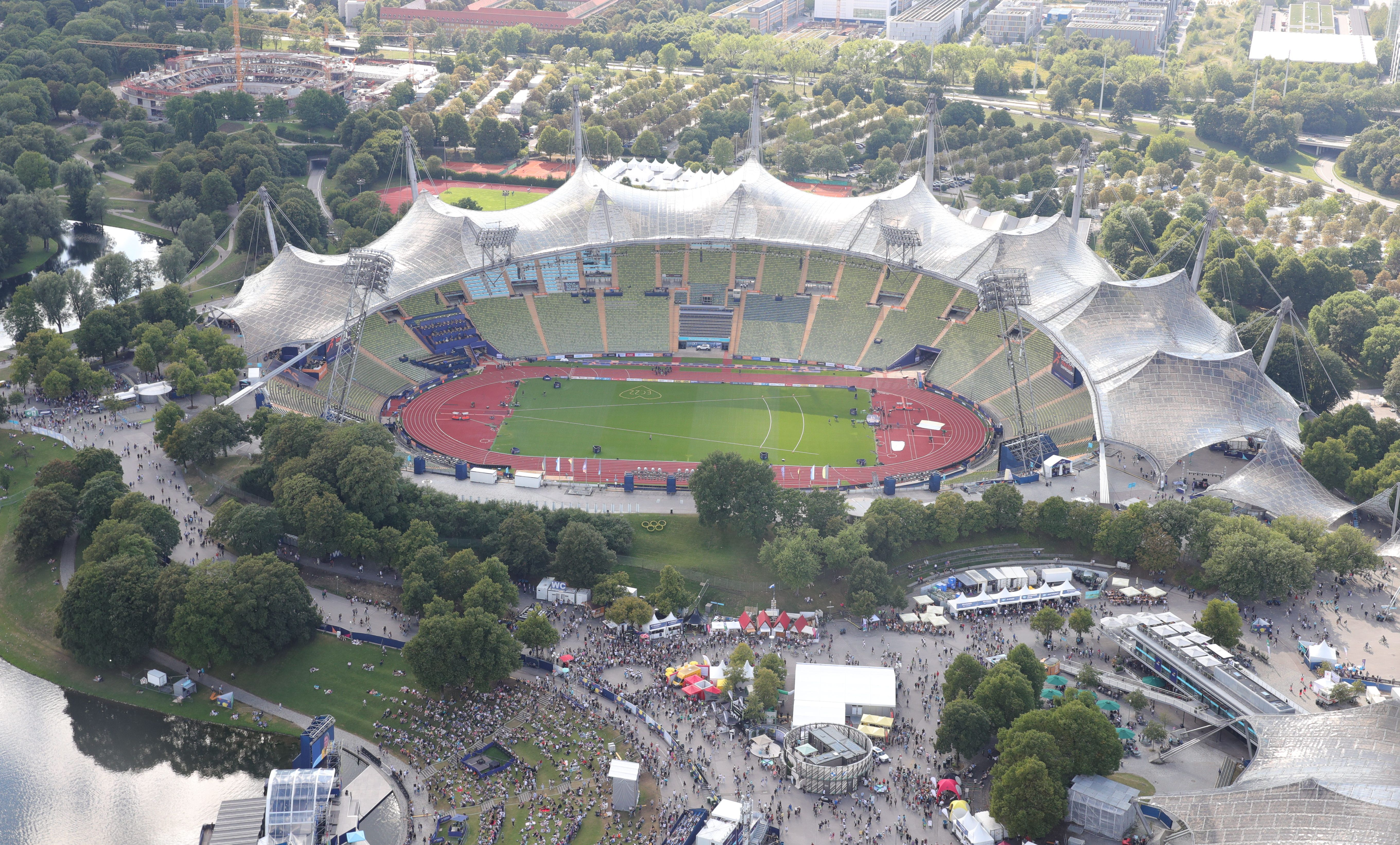
Olympiastadion in August 2022

The women's 4 × 400 metres relay was introduced in 1969 and had been contested sixteen times at European Athletics Championships before 2022. The last edition had been in 2018 – the 2020 European Athletics Championships were cancelled due to the COVID-19 pandemic – which was won by the Polish team in 3:26.59 min, making them the defending champions. The 2022 edition was held at the Olympiastadion in Munich, Germany.

At the start of the 2022 championships, the world and European record was 3:15.17 min, set by the Russian team in 1988, and the championship record was 3:16.87 min, set by the West German team in 1986. The world leading performance in the 2022 season was 3:17.79 min set by the team of the United States and the European leading performance was 3:22.64 min set by the team of Great Britain and Northern Ireland. Both times were achieved during the 2022 World Athletics Championships on 24 July 2022.

Records before the 2022 European Athletics Championships
| Record | Nation (athletes) | Time | Location | Date |
|---|---|---|---|---|
| World record | Soviet Union (Tatyana Ledovskaya, Olga Nazarova; Mariya Pinigina, Olga Bryzgina) | 3:15.17 | Seoul, South Korea | 1 October 1988 |
| European record | Soviet Union (Tatyana Ledovskaya, Olga Nazarova; Mariya Pinigina, Olga Bryzgina) | 3:15.17 | Seoul, South Korea | 1 October 1988 |
| Championship record | East Germany (Kirsten Emmelmann, Sabine Busch; Petra Müller, Marita Koch) | 3:16.87 | Stuttgart, West Germany | 31 August 1986 |
| World leading | United States (Talitha Diggs, Abby Steiner; Britton Wilson, Sydney McLaughlin) | 3:17.79 | Eugene, Oregon, United States | 24 July 2022 |
| European leading | Great Britain (Victoria Ohuruogu, Nicole Yeargin; Jessie Knight, Laviai Nielsen) | 3:22.64 | Eugene, Oregon, United States | 24 July 2022 |

== Qualification ==
For this event, the qualification period was from 1 January 2021 to 26 July 2022. Sixteen national teams could qualify by the ranking of their teams' two fastest times from this period. The host nation's team could also participate if it had not qualified through ranking, taking one of the sixteen qualification spots.

== Rounds ==
=== Round 1 ===
Sixteen teams competed in the two heats of the first round on 19 August, starting at 11:40 (UTC+2) in the morning. The first three teams in each heat (Q) and next two best teams overall (q) advanced to the final. The team of the Czech Republic was disqualified (DQ) for an obstruction at a handover (TR24.8).

Results of round 1
| Rank | Heat | Lane | Nation | Athletes | Time | Notes |
|---|---|---|---|---|---|---|
| 1 | 1 | 3 | Great Britain & N.I. | Zoey Clark, Ama Pipi, Nicole Yeargin, Laviai Nielsen | 3:23.79 | Q |
| 2 | 1 | 5 | Belgium | Naomi Van den Broeck, Imke Vervaet, Helena Ponette, Camille Laus | 3:25.44 | Q, SB |
| 3 | 2 | 8 | Netherlands | Andrea Bouma, Lieke Klaver, Laura de Witte, Lisanne de Witte | 3:25.84 | Q, SB |
| 4 | 1 | 1 | Poland | Kinga Gacka, Małgorzata Hołub-Kowalik, Justyna Święty-Ersetic, Natalia Kaczmarek | 3:26.05 | Q, SB |
| 5 | 2 | 1 | Ireland | Sophie Becker, Phil Healy, Rhasidat Adeleke, Sharlene Mawdsley | 3:26.06 | Q, NR |
| 6 | 2 | 6 | Switzerland | Silke Lemmens, Julia Niederberger, Annina Fahr, Sarah King | 3:26.83 | Q, SB |
| 7 | 1 | 4 | Spain | Eva Santidrián, Aauri Lorena Bokesa, Berta Segura, Laura Hernández | 3:27.76 | q, SB |
| 8 | 2 | 3 | Germany | Alica Schmidt, Mona Mayer, Jessica-Bianca Wessolly, Luna Thiel | 3:27.92 | q, SB |
| 9 | 1 | 2 | Italy | Anna Polinari, Raphaela Boaheng Lukudo, Virginia Troiani, Alice Mangione | 3:28.14 | |
| 10 | 1 | 6 | Hungary | Evelin Nádházy, Bianka Bartha-Kéri, Fanni Rapai, Janka Molnár | 3:29.39 | SB |
| 11 | 2 | 2 | France | Sokhna Lacoste, Marjorie Veyssiere, Diana Iscaye, Amandine Brossier | 3:29.64 | |
| 12 | 1 | 8 | Norway | Linn Oppegaard, Elisabeth Slettum, Line Kloster, Nora Kollerød Wold | 3:31.36 | |
| 13 | 2 | 4 | Slovenia | Agata Zupin, Aneja Simončič, Maja Pogorevc, Anita Horvat | 3:31.57 | |
| 14 | 2 | 5 | Greece | Korina Politi, Andrianna Ferra, Despoina Mourta, Dimitra Gnafaki | 3:33.33 | SB |
| 15 | 2 | 7 | Finland | Milja Thureson, Mette Baas, Aino Pulkkinen, Kristiina Halonen | 3:33.40 | |
| | 1 | 7 | Czech Republic | Tereza Petržilková, Nikoleta Jíchová, Martina Hofmanová, Lada Vondrová | DQ | TR24.8 |

=== Final ===
Eight national teams competed in the final on 20 August, starting at 21:45 (UTC+2) in the evening. In the opening leg, Cynthia Bolingo of Belgium and Victoria Ohuruogu of Great Britain and Northern Ireland were the first to handover their batons, before Anna Kiełbasińska of Poland and Eveline Saalberg of the Netherlands. In the second leg, Lieke Klaver of the Netherlands passed three runners and handed over first, followed by Ama Pipi of Great Britain and Northern Ireland, Iga Baumgart-Witan of Poland, and Hanne Claes of Belgium in that order. In the third leg, Helena Ponette of Belgium passed three runners and handed over first, followed by Jodie Williams of Great Britain and Northern Ireland, Lisanne de Witte of the Netherlands, and Justyna Święty-Ersetic of Poland. In the anchor leg, Femke Bol passed two runners and finished first, followed by Natalia Kaczmarek of Poland, Nicole Yeargin of Great Britain and Northern Ireland, and Camille Laus of Belgium. The race was won by the team of the Netherlands in a European leading time (EL) and national record (NR) of 3:20.87 min, followed by the Polish team in second place in 3:21.68 min and British team in third place in 3:21.74 min. In fourth place, the team of Belgium set a national record (NR) of 3:22.12 min.

Steve Smythe described the last leg by Bol as a "brilliant anchor" in Athletics Weekly. Bol won her third gold medal of these championships here, after she had already won individual gold medals in the 400 metres and 400 metres hurdles. Bol said in an interview after the relay final: "I really love to run with these girls. They're such fantastic athletes and amazing team-mates. It was such an amazing race. These championships feel special to me." Yeargin said about the race, while referring to Bol: "I knew she was going to be there and I had a little bit of a lead so I was happy about that, but I just had to give it my all and we were even coming off the curve so I held her off until then, I gave it my best."

Results of the final
| Rank | Lane | Nation | Athletes | Time | Notes |
|---|---|---|---|---|---|
| 1st place, gold medalist(s) | 6 | Netherlands | Eveline Saalberg, Lieke Klaver, Lisanne de Witte, Femke Bol | 3:20.87 | EL NR |
| 2nd place, silver medalist(s) | 7 | Poland | Anna Kiełbasińska, Iga Baumgart-Witan, Justyna Święty-Ersetic, Natalia Kaczmarek | 3:21.68 | SB |
| 3rd place, bronze medalist(s) | 3 | Great Britain & N.I. | Victoria Ohuruogu, Ama Pipi, Jodie Williams, Nicole Yeargin | 3:21.74 | SB |
| 4 | 4 | Belgium | Cynthia Bolingo, Hanne Claes, Helena Ponette, Camille Laus | 3:22.12 | NR |
| 5 | 1 | Germany | Luna Thiel, Mona Mayer, Alica Schmidt, Carolina Krafzik | 3:26.09 | SB |
| 6 | 5 | Ireland | Sophie Becker, Phil Healy, Rhasidat Adeleke, Sharlene Mawdsley | 3:26.63 | |
| 7 | 8 | Switzerland | Silke Lemmens, Julia Niederberger, Annina Fahr, Sarah King | 3:26.94 | |
| 8 | 2 | Spain | Eva Santidrián, Aauri Lorena Bokesa, Berta Segura, Sara Gallego | 3:29.70 | |
