= Athletics at the 2019 Summer Universiade – Men's shot put =

The men's shot put event at the 2019 Summer Universiade was held on 8 July at the Stadio San Paolo in Naples.

== Medalists ==
Gold	Silver	Bronze
Konrad Bukowiecki; Poland	Andrew Liskowitz; United States	Uziel Muñoz; Mexico

== Results ==
=== Qualification ===
Qualification: 19.70 m (Q) or at least 12 best (q) qualified for the final.

Rank	Group	Name	Nationality	#1	#2	#3	Result	Notes
1	B	Konrad Bukowiecki	Poland	20.19			20.19	Q
2	A	Simon Bayer	Germany	19.95			19.95	Q, PB
3	A	Mohamed Magdi Hamza Khalif	Egypt	19.86			19.86	Q, SB
4	A	Willian Venancio	Brazil	19.83			19.83	Q, SB
5	A	Uziel Muñoz	Mexico	x	19.76		19.76	Q
6	B	Andrew Liskowitz	United States	19.09	19.63	19.41	19.63	q
7	A	Eric Favors Jr.	Ireland	19.17	x	19.20	19.20	q
8	B	Jason van Rooyen	South Africa	18.48	19.20	x	19.20	q
9	B	Christian Zimmermann	Germany	19.15	x	18.30	19.15	q
10	A	Ryan Ballantyne	New Zealand	18.35	19.12	x	19.12	q, PB
11	B	Andrei Toader	Romania	19.06	18.97	18.82	19.06	q
12	B	Sebastiano Bianchetti	Italy	18.68	18.99	18.90	18.99	q
13	A	Kayle Blignaut	South Africa	x	18.14	18.55	18.55	
14	B	Juan Ignacio Carballo	Argentina	18.39	17.69	17.94	18.39	PB
15	A	Daniel McArthur	United States	18.15	18.33	18.03	18.33	
16	B	Kert Piirimäe	Estonia	17.28	17.64	17.56	17.64	PB
17	A	Roman Kokoshko	Ukraine	16.51	17.49	x	17.49	
18	A	José Miguel Ballivian	Chile	17.26	x	x	17.26	
19	B	Karanveer Singh	India	x	17.10	16.76	17.10	
20	A	Karolis Maisuradze	Lithuania	15.57	16.44	x	16.44	
	A	Osman Can Özdeveci	Turkey	x	x	x	NM	
	B	Welington Morais	Brazil	x	x	x	NM	
	B	Shehab Abdalaziz	Egypt	x	x	x	DNS	

=== Final ===
Rank	Name	Nationality	#1	#2	#3	#4	#5	#6	Result	Notes
1st place, gold medalist(s)	Konrad Bukowiecki	Poland	20.63	x	x	21.00	21.54	21.39	21.54	UR
2nd place, silver medalist(s)	Andrew Liskowitz	United States	18.08	19.70	20.17	19.46	20.49	x	20.49	PB
3rd place, bronze medalist(s)	Uziel Muñoz	Mexico	18.51	19.54	x	19.20	20.45	20.14	20.45	
4	Willian Venancio	Brazil	19.73	19.76	19.99	19.88	19.62	19.64	19.99	SB
5	Sebastiano Bianchetti	Italy	19.57	19.81	x	x	19.79	x	19.81	PB
6	Jason van Rooyen	South Africa	19.53	x	19.01	x	x	x	19.53	
7	Christian Zimmermann	Germany	19.32	19.20	18.91	x	x	x	19.32	
8	Mohamed Magdi Hamza Khalif	Egypt	19.12	x	x	x	19.26	x	19.26	SB
9	Simon Bayer	Germany	18.95	x	x				18.95	
10	Eric Favors	Ireland	18.80	x	18.94				18.94	
11	Ryan Ballantyne	New Zealand	18.14	17.79	x				18.14	
	Andrei Toader	Romania	x	r					NM	
