= Czech Republic at the 2024 European Athletics Championships =

- Flag of Czech Republic
- WA code: CZE

in Rome, Italy 7 June 2024 – 12 June 2022
- Competitors: 54 (31 men and 23 women)
- Medals Ranked 17th: Gold 1 Silver 0 Bronze 0 Total 1

European Athletics Championships appearances
- 1994; 1998; 2002; 2006; 2010; 2012; 2014; 2016; 2018; 2022; 2024; 2026

Other related appearances
- Czechoslovakia (1934–1990)

The Czech Republic competed at the 2024 European Athletics Championships in Rome, Italy from 7–12 June 2024.

== Medallists ==
Medal	Name	Event	Date
Gold	Jakub Vadlejch	Men's javelin throw	12 June

== Results ==
Czech Republic entered the following athletes.

Key

- Q = Qualified for the next round
- q = Qualified for the next round as a fastest loser or, in field events, by position without achieving the qualifying target
- NR = National record
- PB = Personal best
- SB = Season best
- N/A = Round not applicable for the event

=== Men ===
Track and road events

Athlete	Event	Heat		Semifinal		Final	
Athlete	Event	Result	Rank	Result	Rank	Result	Rank
Zdeněk Stromšík	100 metres	10.39	16	Did not advance			
Jan Veleba	100 metres	10.53 SB	20	Did not advance			
Eduard Kubelík	200 metres	20.91	11 q	Withdrew			
Ondřej Macík	200 metres	Bye		20.89	19	Did not advance	
Tomáš Němejc	200 metres	20.54 SB	2 q	20.52 PB	8 q	20.91	6
Matěj Krsek	400 metres	46.69	21	Did not advance			
Pavel Maslák	400 metres	47.99	22	Did not advance			
Patrik Šorm	400 metres	46.40	19	Did not advance			
Jakub Dudycha	800 metres	1:44.89 WU20L	2 Q	1:46.94	11	Did not advance	
Vít Müller	400 metres hurdles	49.38 SB	3 q	49.25 SB	12	Did not advance	
Adam Smolka	400 metres hurdles	50.48 SB	14	Did not advance			
Martin Tuček	400 metres hurdles	51.27	20	Did not advance			
Tomáš Habarta	3000 metres steeplechase	8:23.96	8 Q	—N/a		8:21.83 EU23L	10
Damián Vích	3000 metres steeplechase	8:34.27	6 Q	—N/a		8:22.95 PB	12
Vít Hlaváč	20 kilometres walk	—N/a				1:23:53	18
Zdeněk Stromšík; Jan Veleba; Jan Jirka; Ondřej Macík	4 × 100 metres relay	39.22	11	—N/a		Did not advance	
Michael Desenský; Patrik Šorm; Adam Smolka; Philip Krenek	4 × 400 metres relay	3:06.70	12	—N/a		Did not advance	

Field events

Athlete	Event	Qualification		Final	
Athlete	Event	Distance	Position	Distance	Position
Marek Bahník	High jump	2.17	14	Did not advance	
Jan Štefela	High jump	2.21	1 q	2.26	5
David Holý	Pole vault	5.60	1 q	5.50	12
Matěj Ščerba	Pole vault	5.60	11 q	5.65	10
Radek Juška	Long jump	7.72	23	Did not advance	
Petr Meindlschmid	Long jump	8.01 PB	9 Q	8.03 PB	7
Tadeáš Procházka	Shot put	17.95	26	Did not advance	
Tomáš Staněk	Shot put	20.53	5 q	20.88	5
Marek Bárta	Discus throw	61.20	17	Did not advance	
Jaroslav Jílek	Javelin throw	NM		Did not advance	
Martin Konečný	Javelin throw	NM		Did not advance	
Jakub Vadlejch	Javelin throw	83.36	4 Q	88.65 SB	1st place, gold medalist(s)
Patrik Hájek	Hammer throw	72.72	21	Did not advance	
Volodymyr Myslyčuk	Hammer throw	73.43	17	Did not advance	

Combined events – Decathlon

Athlete	Event	100 m	LJ	SP	HJ	400 m	110H	DT	PV	JT	1500 m	Final	Rank
Vilém Stráský	Result	10.65 PB	7.37	14.95 PB	1.90	49.17	14.24	40.08 SB	4.80	56.47 SB	4:29.70	8088 PB	10
Vilém Stráský	Points	940	903	787	714	853	944	666	849	685	747	8088 PB	10

=== Women ===
Track and road events

Athlete	Event	Heat		Semifinal		Final	
Athlete	Event	Result	Rank	Result	Rank	Result	Rank
Karolína Maňasová	100 metres	11.45	14 q	11.17 PB	10	Did not advance	
Lurdes Gloria Manuel	400 metres	51.36	2 q	51.06	6 q	50.52 WU20L	4
Tereza Petržilková	400 metres	51.96	5 q	52.05	14	Did not advance	
Kristiina Sasínek Mäki	1500 metres	4:12.76	7	—N/a		Did not advance	
Tereza Hrochová	Half marathon	—N/a				1:11:38 PB	23
Moira Stewartová	Half marathon	—N/a				1:13:41	45
Helena Jiranová	100 metres hurdles	13.45	19	Did not advance			
Nikoleta Jíchová	400 metres hurdles	54.88 =PB	1 q	54.59 PB	6 Q	54.91	4
Eliška Martínková	20 kilometres walk	—N/a				1:31:58	11
Marcela Pírková; Tereza Petržilková; Barbora Veselá; Barbora Malíková	4 × 400 metres relay	DQ		—N/a		Did not advance	

Field events

Athlete	Event	Qualification		Final	
Athlete	Event	Distance	Position	Distance	Position
Michaela Hrubá	High jump	1.85	19	Did not advance	
Nikola Pöschlová	Pole vault	4.40	13	Did not advance	
Amálie Švábíková	Pole vault	4.50	1 q	4.58	4
Nikola Ogrodníková	Javelin throw	58.52	7 q	61.78 SB	5
Petra Sičaková	Javelin throw	52.86	24	Did not advance	
Andrea Železná	Javelin throw	55.57	18	Did not advance	

=== Mixed ===
Track and road events

Athlete	Event	Final	
Athlete	Event	Result	Rank
Matěj Krsek; Lada Vondrová; Vít Müller; Barbora Malíková	4 × 400 metres relay	3:14.24 SB	6
