= Jerry Clayton =

American politician

Jerry L. Clayton was the elected Sheriff of Washtenaw County, Michigan. A 30-year public safety professional, Clayton was first elected sheriff in 2008. He was re-elected in 2012, 2016, and 2020. He did not run for reelection in 2024. Clayton was succeeded by Washtenaw County Sheriff Alyshia Dyer as of the beginning of 2025.

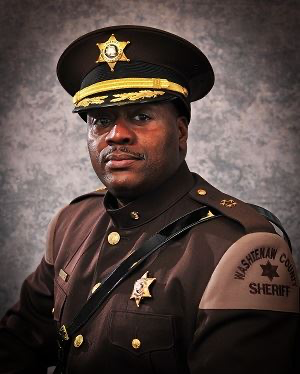
Official Department Photo of Sheriff Clayton

== Early life and career ==
Clayton graduated from Eastern Michigan University, where he played on the football team. He started at the Washtenaw County Sheriff's Office in 1981 as a part-time corrections officer, and rose through the ranks before retiring as a first lieutenant in 2006.

== Washtenaw County Sheriff ==
In 2008, Clayton, a Democrat, ran for Washtenaw County Sheriff against two-term incumbent Daniel Minzey. Clayton racked up multiple endorsements from Democratic officials, and defeated Minzey in a 3-way primary in August, 2008. Clayton then defeated his Republican opposition in November 2008. He was sworn into office in January, 2009.

Clayton has made community relations a hallmark of his term in office, appointing Derrick Jackson to the position of community liaison director. Clayton has also been an advocate for increased funding for mental health-related services. In 2017, he helped lead the successful effort for a dedicated tax in Washtenaw County to fund mental health and public safety. Voters approved that tax in November 2017 by nearly a 2-1 margin.

Clayton is known as a leader in the criminal-justice reform movement. In 2018, he was elected as a founding member of the national Council on Criminal Justice, an organization that seeks to better the criminal justice system. In 2019, he was appointed to Governor Gretchen Whitmer's Joint Task Force on Jail and Pretrial Incarceration. And in 2020, Clayton was selected to serve on the National Police Foundation's Council on Policing Reforms and Race, dedicated to improving racial equity in policing across the country. He was also selected to serve on Governor Whitmer's Black Leadership Advisory Council, which will help the Governor develop, review, and recommend policies and actions designed to prevent and eradicate discrimination and racial inequity in Michigan.

Clayton was re-elected to a fourth term in office in the 2020 election cycle. He defeated Ken Magee in the Democratic primary, securing 59,675 votes to Magee's 19,082. Clayton had no Republican challenger in the November 2020 general election, and won with 159,603 votes (98.82%).
