= Mary Cullen =

Irish long-distance runner

Medal record

Women's athletics

Representing Ireland

European Athletics Indoor Championships
| Bronze medal – third place | 2009 Turin | 3000 m |

Mary Teresa Cullen (born 17 August 1982) is an Irish long-distance runner who specializes in the 3000 metres and 5000 metres on the track, and cross country running. She holds the Irish record over 3000 m indoors.

== Early career ==
Born in Sligo, she competed in international athletics at a young age, running in the junior race at the 1999 IAAF World Cross Country Championships and the 3000 metres at the inaugural IAAF World Youth Championships in Athletics when she was sixteen years old. After meeting American coach Ray Treacy in Ireland, he offered her a scholarship to attend university in the United States. She went on to study social sciences at Providence College and represented their college athletics team, the Providence Friars. In her first year in 2001–2002, she ran a personal best for fifth in the 5000 metres at the Big East Championships, won the 3000 m at the Penn Relays and competed at the NCAA Women's Cross Country Championship. She improved the following year: a fourth place in the regional competition and a 28th-place finish at the NCAA National Cross Country Championship earned her All-American honours. In indoor competitions, she took third in the 3000 m and fourth in the distance medley relay. She took fourth in the 5000 m NCAA regionals with a personal best of 15:56.96 and finished in fifth at the NCAA Women's Outdoor Track and Field Championship, gaining her second All-American honours of the season.

Her final year at Providence College in 2003–04 was perhaps her most successful: she won the mile run at the Women's Challenge Cup and also won the mile and the distance medley relay race at the University of Rhode Island Invitational. Cross country competition brought further success: a number of podium finishes included second-place finishes at both the NCAA regionals and Big East Championships, and she capped off the season by finishing fifth at the NCAA National Cross Country Championships, receiving her third All-America honours for the feat.

== Professional athletics ==
In the 5000 metres she finished twelfth at the 2006 European Championships, and competed without reaching the final at the 2007 World Championships. In the 3000 metres event she finished seventh at the 2007 European Indoor Championships.

She just missed out on the medals with a fourth position finish at the 2008 European Cross Country Championships, ending up two seconds behind bronze medallist Inês Monteiro. She suffered a calf injury a few months later and missed the 2008 Beijing Olympics as a result.

She broke Sonia O'Sullivan's indoor 3000 m national record at the Valentine Invitation Meet in Boston, Massachusetts. Her time of 8:43.74 was the fifth fastest that year in the world and she was selected as Ireland's athlete of the month. She won the bronze at the 2009 European Athletics Indoor Championships the following month.

There were high expectations for the 2009 European Cross Country Championships, which was held in her native Ireland. However, she finished the race out of contention in twelfth position, behind her compatriot Fionnuala Britton. She later commented that she had put too much pressure on herself to perform and had suffered accordingly. She rebounded the following month with a win at the Belfast International Cross Country, beating Anikó Kálovics and Cross Country Champion Hayley Yelling to the finish line.

Run by Mary Cullen in County Donegal at 2015 Finn Valley 5k setting a course record in 15.45 inside previous of Olympic medalist and World champ Vivian Cheruiyot 16.14.

== Personal bests ==
- 1500 metres - 4:15.88 min (2007, indoor)
- Mile run - 4:32.29 min (2007, indoor)
- 3000 metres - 8:43.74 min(2009, indoor NR)
- 5000 metres - 15:18.34 min (2009, indoor)
- 10,000 metres - 32:21.42 min (2007)
