= Mark Smyth (athlete) =

Irish sprinter

Personal information
- Nationality: Irish
- Born: 2 July 1998 (age 28) Dublin, Ireland
- Height: 184 cm (6 ft 0 in)

Sport
- Country: Ireland
- Sport: Track and field
- Club: Raheny Shamrock Athletic Club
- Coached by: Kay Bannon

Achievements and titles
- Personal bests: Outdoors; 100 m: 10.40 (2021); 200 m: 20.60 (2024); Indoors; 60 m: 6.80 (2023); 200 m: 20.64 NR (2023)

Mark Smyth (born 2 July 1998) is an Irish track and field athlete who competes in the sprints at an international level.

He set an Irish national record for the indoor 200 metres in March 2023.

Smyth ran in the 200 metres and 4 x 100 metres relay at the 2023 European Athletics Team Championships Third Division (part of the 2023 European Games).

Smyth competed at the 2024 European Championships in June. In the 200 m, he advanced to the semi finals. Smyth competed on the 4 × 100 m relay, running the second leg.

== Personal life ==
Mark Smyth is from Raheny, Dublin. He is a member of Raheny Shamrock Athletic Club. Smyth began competitive sprinting under coach Kay Bannon while attending St Fintan's High School, Sutton in 2016. In 2022, he completed a Multimedia degree from Dublin City University and subsequently began a Masters in Emerging Media.

== Achievements ==
=== Personal bests ===
All information taken from World Athletics profile.

Type	Event	Time	Date	Place	Notes
Outdoor	100 metres	10.40	25 July 2021	Carlow, Ireland	+0.8 m/s (wind)
Outdoor	200 metres	20.60	9 July 2024	Cork, Ireland	+1.4 m/s (wind)
Outdoor	4 x 100 metres relay	39.27	24 July 2022	Tullamore, Ireland	
Indoor	60 metres	6.80	18 January 2023	Abbotstown, Ireland	
Indoor	200 metres	20.64	11 March 2023	Abbotstown, Ireland	NR
Indoor	4 x 200 metres relay	1:26.82	15 February 2020	Athlone, Ireland	
