= Rhasidat Adeleke =

Irish sprinter (born 2002)

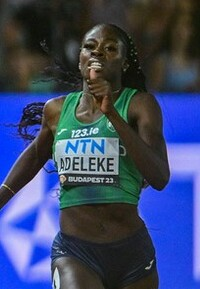
- Adeleke at the 2023 World Athletics Championships

Personal information
- Born: 29 August 2002 (age 24) Dublin, Ireland
- Education: University of Texas
- Height: 1.83 m (6 ft 0 in)

Sport
- Country: Ireland
- Sport: Athletics
- Event: Sprints
- College team: Texas Longhorns
- Club: Tallaght AC
- Coached by: Edrick Floréal

Achievements and titles
- Personal bests: Outdoors; 100 m: 11.13 NR (Dublin 2024); 200 m: 22.28 NR (Birmingham 2026); 400 m: 49.07 NR (Rome 2024); Indoors; 60 m: 7.15i NR (Birmingham 2024); 200 m: 22.49i NR (Albuquerque 2024); 300 m: 36.42i NBP (New York 2024); 400 m: 50.33i NR (Lubbock 2023)
Medal record
Women's athletics
Representing Ireland
World Athletics Relays
Bronze medal – third place	2024 Nassau	4 × 400 m mixed
World U20 Championships
Silver medal – second place	2018 Tampere	4 × 100 m relay
European Championships
Gold medal – first place	2024 Rome	4 × 400 m mixed
Silver medal – second place	2024 Rome	4 × 400 m relay
Silver medal – second place	2024 Rome	400 m
Silver medal – second place	2026 Birmingham	200 m
European U20 Championships
Gold medal – first place	2021 Tallinn	100 m
Gold medal – first place	2021 Tallinn	200 m
European U18 Championships
Gold medal – first place	2018 Győr	200 m
European Youth Olympic Festival
Silver medal – second place	2017 Győr	200 m
Bronze medal – third place	2017 Győr	4 × 100 m

Rhasidat Adeleke (/rəˈʃiːdə ˌædəˈlɛkeɪ/ rə-SHEE-də AD-ə-LEK-ay, Yoruba: [ādélékè]; born 29 August 2002) is an Irish sprinter and Olympian. She was the silver medalist in the 400 m at the 2024 European Championships and the silver medalist in the 200 m at the 2026 European Championship in Birmingham, running a national record. She was a member of the European Championship-winning Irish mixed 4 × 400 metre relay team at the 2024 European Championships, and its silver medal-winning women's 4 × 400 metre relay team.

Adeleke was the first Irish woman to break the 50-second barrier in the 400 metres. She holds seven individual Irish national records (60 m indoors, 100 m outdoors, 200 m indoors and out, 300 m indoors and 400 m indoors and out). As part of relay teams, she contributed to setting two additional national records: the women's 4 × 400 metres relay and the mixed 4 × 400 metres relay.

== Early life and education ==
Adeleke was born in Dublin in 2002 to Yoruba parents Ade and Prince Adeleke, originally from Oyo State in western Nigeria. Ade has worked for the Irish state postal company An Post.

She attended St Mark's Primary school in Tallaght before going on to attend Presentation Community College Terenure where she completed her Leaving Certificate in 2020.

She is a member of Tallaght Athletic Club.

== Career ==
In 2017, 14-year-old Rhasidat Adeleke won a junior sprint double at the Irish Schools championships for Presentation College, Terenure. A month later, she claimed the silver medal in the 200 metres at the European Youth Olympic Festival held in Győr, Hungary.

In 2018, she took gold in the event at the European Under-18 Championships staged also in Győr, and a silver at the World U20 Championships in Tampere, Finland, competing in the heats of the 4 × 100 m relay with Molly Scott, Gina Akpe-Moses, Ciara Neville and Patience Jumbo-Gula.

In 2019, she claimed the 100 m / 200 m sprint double at the European Youth Olympic Festival held in Baku, Azerbaijan.

=== 2021-2022: European U20 double gold and Irish 400 m record ===
In 2021, still 18, Adeleke won her first senior international outdoor title followed by winning the 100 m / 200 m sprint double at the European U20 Championships in Tallinn, Estonia, the first women's sprint double at these championships since 2011. That same year, she took up a scholarship with the University of Texas at Austin and competed in the US Collegiate Indoor Championships.

In August 2022, she placed fifth in the 400 metres final at the European Championships held in Munich, setting an Irish record of 50.53 seconds.

=== 2023: World 400 m finalist ===
On 21 January, the 20-year-old lowered her own national indoor 200 m record with a world-leading time of 22.52 s, the fastest time by a European woman since 2003, at the Martin Luther King Invitational in Albuquerque, New Mexico (at altitude). On 4 February, at the UNM Collegiate Classic also in Albuquerque, she set a new Irish indoor record in the 400 m with a world-leading 50.45 s, the fastest time in history indoors or out by an Irish woman. Adeleke improved this mark to 50.33 s the same month, on 25 February at the Big 12 Indoor Championships in Lubbock, Texas, breaking the NCAA record and putting her 14th on the respective world all-time list. The following month, she ran 50.45 s at the NCCA Indoors final, again in Albuquerque, earning the silver medal to become the first Irish athlete to win a medal in an NCAA sprint event. She picked up a second silver just one hour later, anchoring the Texas women's 4 × 400 m relay.

Adeleke opened her outdoor season at the Texas Relays in Austin on 31 March. She split 21.7 s in the second 200 m leg of the Texas sprint medley relay, which shattered the collegiate record with a time of 3:36.10. The following day, she ran in three other relays, including the 4 × 100 m and 4 × 200 m teams which set NCAA records with times of 42.00 s and 1:28.05 respectively, whilst the 4 × 400 m team anchored by Adeleke won the competition. On 14 and 15 April, Adeleke obliterated both her national 200 m and 400 m records clocking 22.34 and 49.90 seconds respectively at the Tom Jones Memorial in Gainesville, Florida, becoming the first Irish woman to break the 50-second barrier at the longer distance. A month later, she was part of the relay team that lowered Texas 4 × 100 m collegiate record with a time of 41.89 s at the Big 12 Championships in Norman, Oklahoma. On 27 May, she further lowered her 400 m Irish record to 49.54 s at the NCCA Western Regionals in Sacramento, California. On 8 June, she was part of the Texas 4 × 100 m relay team that again broke the NCCA record in the semi-finals at the NCCA Division 1 National Outdoor Championships in Austin, Texas in 41.55 s. At the same meet on 10 June she again lowered her national record over 400 m to 49.20 s to take gold in the final, having earlier taken gold as part of the Texas quartet that won the 4 × 100 m relay.

On 16 July, Adeleke announced that she would be forgoing her final year of eligibility at the University of Texas and would instead be turning professional. Adeleke ran her first race as a professional, representing Nike, at the Gyulai István Memorial 2023, a World Athletics Continental Tour Gold meeting in Székesfehérvár on 18 July. She finished second in the 200 m in 22.36 (just outside her Irish record of 22.34), behind Shericka Jackson of Jamaica, who ran 22.02. Adeleke made her Wanda Diamond League debut on 21 July at the Herculis meet in Monaco. She finished fourth in the 400 metres in 49.99s, in a race won by Poland's Natalia Kaczmarek, who finished in 49.63s. On 20 August, Adeleke won her heat in the 400 m in 50.8 s at the World Athletic Championships in Budapest, Hungary. On 21 August, she finished second in her semi-final in 49.87 behind the Olympic silver medalist Marileidy Paulino, registering the fourth fastest time overall. In the final on 23 August, Adeleke finished fourth in 50.13, behind Paulino (48.76), Kaczmarek (49.57) and Sada Williams of Barbados (49.60).

=== 2024: Olympic 400 m finalist and mixed 4×400 m European gold ===
On 20 January, Adeleke broke her Irish national indoor 60 m and 200 m records at the Dr Martin Luther King Jr Collegiate Invitational in Albuquerque, running 7.15s and 22.49s respectively. Adeleke broke her own Irish 300 metres indoors record at the Millrose Games in New York on 11 February, running 36.42 sec to finish second behind Talitha Diggs. Adeleke opened her outdoor season on 30 March at the Texas Relays in Austin, where she ran the second leg in the 4 × 200 m. The winning time, 1:27.05, was a new World Best, but not a world record, as the team of Adeleke, Julien Alfred, Lanae-Tava Thomas, and Dina Asher-Smith are from different countries. On 27 April, at the Texas Invitational in Austin, Adeleke won the open 100 metres in 10.84 s, ahead of Celera Barnes, Dina Asher-Smith and Julien Alfred. Adeleke's time did not constitute a new Irish record as her run was wind-assisted (+3.5 metres per second).

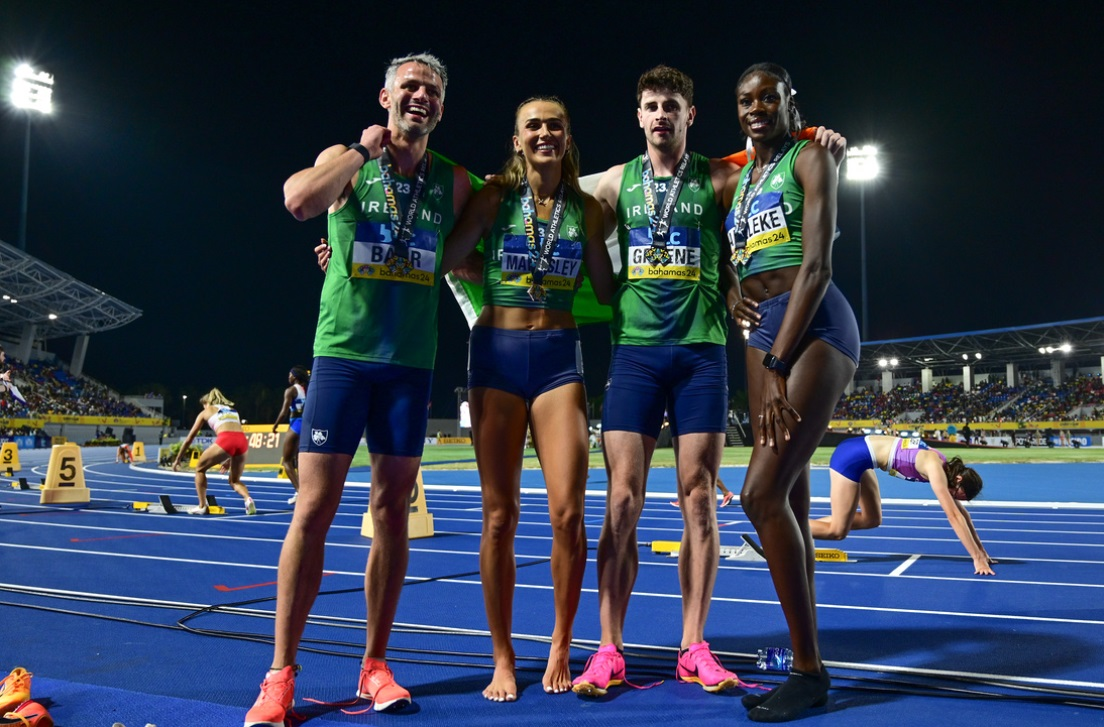
Adeleke (right) and the Irish mixed 4×400 m team after the 2024 World Relays.

At the World Athletics Relays in the Bahamas on 4 May, Adeleke helped Ireland's mixed 4 × 400 m and women's 4 × 400 m relay teams to win their heats and qualify for the 2024 Olympics in Paris, running sub 50 second splits on the second leg in both. First, the team of Cillin Greene, Adeleke, Thomas Barr and Sharlene Mawdsley set a new Irish record of 3.12.50 to win the mixed relay heat. Then, some 90 minutes later, the team of Sophie Becker, Adeleke, Phil Healy and Sharlene Mawdsley ran 3.24.38 - another Irish record - to take their heat. On 5 May, Adeleke ran the second leg of the mixed 4 × 400 m final at the same meet, and helped the Irish team to a third-place finish in 3.11.53, a new Irish record, behind the United States (3.10.73) and the Netherlands (3.11.45). Adeleke had the fastest 400 m split time (48.45) across all female 400 m runners at the meet, with 2023 world champion Marileidy Paulino next fastest (48.93), followed by world indoor champion Femke Bol (49.54). Adeleke (and teammate Sharlene Mawdsley) sat out the 4 × 400 women's final, as it took place just 30 minutes after the mixed final. On 18 May, Adeleke finished fourth over 200 m at the Los Angeles Grand Prix in 22.45, behind Americans Sydney McLaughlin-Levrone (22.07), Abby Steiner (22.32), and Brittany Brown (22.35). Adeleke's time was inside the Paris Olympics qualifying standard of 22.57 but below her Irish record of 22.34 set in 2023.

At the European Championships in Rome on 7 June, Adeleke ran the second leg of the mixed 4 × 400 m relay, helping Ireland to win a gold medal, ahead of Italy and the Netherlands. The Irish team of Chris O'Donnell, Adeleke, Thomas Barr, and Sharlene Mawdsley ran a new Irish record of 3.09.92, with Adeleke running a split time of 49.53 s. In the semi-final of the individual 400 metres at the same meet, on 9 June, Adeleke won her heat in 50.54 - the fastest among all qualifiers. In the 400 m final on 10 June, Adeleke took silver in a new Irish record (49.07 s), just behind the winner, Poland's Natalia Kaczmarek (48.98 s). In the final of the women's 4 × 400 m relay on 12 June, Adeleke ran the second leg to help power Ireland to a silver medal in a new national record (3.22.95 s) behind the Netherlands (3.22.71 s). Other members of the Irish quartet were again Sophie Becker, Phil Healy and Sharlene Mawdsley. At the 2024 Irish Championships, Adeleke broke the 100 metre national record, winning with a time of 11.13 seconds.

At the Monaco Diamond League meet on 12 July, Adeleke won the 400 m in 49.17, her second fastest time ever, ahead of Lieke Klaver (49.64) and Kendall Ellis (50.39). At the London Diamond League meet on 20 July, Adeleke finished fifth over 200 m in 22.35, with USA's Gabrielle Thomas (21.82) taking top spot.

On 5 August, at the Olympic Games in Paris, Adeleke won her heat in the 400 metres in 50.09, ahead of Alexis Holmes, who ran 50.35. Adeleke posted the seventh fastest qualifying time, with Marileidy Paulino posting the fastest (49.42). In the first heat of the semi-finals on 7 August, Adeleke, finished second in 49.95, behind 2019 World champion Salwa Eid Naser of Bahrain (49.08), and qualified for the final. Her time was 6th fastest of the 8 qualifiers, with Naser running the fastest time. As in the 2023 World Championship, Adeleke finished in fourth position in the Olympic final on 9 August in 49.28, behind the winner, Paulino, who ran an Olympic record 48.17, Naser in second in 48.53 and Kaczmarek in third in 48.98. Although Adeleke was in position to take third place on the home straight, she was passed by Kaczmarek as the finishing line approached, and just held off Great Britain's Amber Anning (49.29), who finished fifth. On 10 August, in the final of the women's 4 × 400 m relay, Adeleke received the baton from lead runner Sophie Becker in sixth position, and moved to second place, before handing over to Phil Healy. Sharlene Mawdsley ran the final leg, and Ireland just missed out on a bronze medal, finishing in fourth position in 3.19.90, a new national record, behind USA (3.15.37), the Netherlands (3.19.50) and Great Britain (3.19.72). Adeleke's split was 48.92.

At the Silesia Diamond League, on 25 August, Adeleke again finished fourth over 400 metres in 50.00, behind Paulino (48.66), Naser (49.23) and Kaczmarek (49.95). She concluded the season with a third-place finish in the 400 m and €6,300 in prize money at the Wanda Diamond League Final in Brussels on 13 September. Adeleke initially crossed the line in fourth, however the disqualification of Salwa Eid Naser for a lane infringement awarded her third place and a spot on the podium.

=== 2025: Injury issues ===
On April 18, Adeleke finished in fourth place at the Tom Jones Memorial meeting in Gainesville, Florida. She clocked an impressive 22.57 seconds, nearly breaking her personal best and national record of 22.34, which she set at the same event two years ago. The event was won by Olympic-silver-medalist Julien Alfred with a time of 21.88. Adeleke's time automatically qualified her to race the 200 m at the World Championships in Tokyo in September. On May 3, Adeleke finished second over 200 m in her first Diamond League outing of the year in Keqiao, China in 22.72, behind Anavia Battle who posted a winning time of 22.38.

On May 10, at the World Relays in Guangzhou, China, Adeleke helped Ireland's 4 × 400 m mixed relay team to qualify for this event at the World Championships in Tokyo next September. The team finished second behind the United States in Heat 2 in 3.12.56. At the same meet on the following day, Adeleke helped the Irish women's 4 × 400 m relay team to qualify for Tokyo, running the second leg in a repechage heat. Ireland won the heat in 3.24.69 secs, finishing 15 metres ahead of Australia.

Adeleke made her seasonal debut over 400 metres at the Bislett Games in Oslo on June 12. She finished fourth in 50.42, behind Isabella Whittaker (49.58), Henriette Jaeger (49.62), and Amber Anning (50.24). On June 15, Adeleke finished in sixth position at the Stockholm Diamond League meet, again over 400 metres, in 50.48s. The winner was Whittaker of the US in 49.78s. On July 5th, at the Prefontaine Classic in Eugene, Adeleke finished fourth in the 400 metres (a non-Diamond League race) in 51.33. The winner was American Sydney McLaughlin-Levrone in 49.43s. At the London Diamond League on July 19, Adeleke finished in fourth position in the 200 m in a seasonal best of 22.52, with Julian Alfred of Saint Lucia winning in a world-leading 21.71. Shortly after the London Diamond League meet, Adeleke announced that she would miss the World Championship in Tokyo because of injuries she had suffered.

=== 2026: European 200 m silver ===
Adeleke opened her indoor season at the Tyson Invitational in Arkansas on February 14, finishing second to Stacey Ann Williams over 300 metres. Adeleke's time of 36.30 sec broke her Irish record over the distance, set at the 2024 Milrose Games. At the Prefontaine Classic in Eugene on July 3rd, Adeleke finished in ninth position over 400 metres in 52.26 seconds, in a race won by Dejanea Oakley in 49.64 seconds. On July 16th, at the Spitzen Leichtathletik Luzern, Adeleke finished fourth in Final 2 of the 200 metres in 23.07. The winner was Fabienne Hoenke of Switzerland in 22.78.

In the 200 m final at the Irish National Championships, Adeleke won in 22.80, thereby qualifying for the European Championships in Birmingham in August. At the European Championships on August 13th, she finished second in the final in a new national record of 22.28 s, to claim silver behind Amy Hunt who ran 22.19.

On September 13, Adeleke finished in fifth position in the first semi-final of the 200 m at the World Ultimate Championships in Budapest, running a time of 22.81. She did not advance to the final. At the Athlos meet in London on September 18, Adeleke finished fourth over 200 m in 22.64, netting a prize of €13,000, in a race won by Gabrielle Thomas in 22.13.

=== International competitions ===
Representing Ireland
Year	Competition	Venue	Position	Event	Time
2017	European Youth Olympic Festival	Győr, Hungary	2nd	200 m	23.81
2017	European Youth Olympic Festival	Győr, Hungary	3rd	4 × 100 m relay	46.38
2018	European U18 Championships	Győr, Hungary	1st	200 m	23.52 EYL
2018	World U20 Championships	Tampere, Finland	2nd	4 × 100 m relay	44.27^{1}
2019	World Relays	Yokohama, Japan	10th (h)	4 × 100 m relay	44.02 SB
2019	European Youth Olympic Festival	Baku, Azerbaijan	1st	100 m	11.70
2019	European Youth Olympic Festival	Baku, Azerbaijan	1st	200 m	23.92
2021	European U20 Championships	Tallinn, Estonia	1st	100 m	11.34
2021	European U20 Championships	Tallinn, Estonia	1st	200 m	22.90 EU20L NR
2021	European U20 Championships	Tallinn, Estonia	5th	4 × 400 m relay	3:37.39
2022	World Championships	Eugene, United States	9th (sf)	400 m	50.81
2022	World Championships	Eugene, United States	8th	4 × 400 m mixed	3:13.88^{1}
2022	European Championships	Munich, Germany	5th	400 m	50.53 NR
2022	European Championships	Munich, Germany	6th	4 × 400 m relay	3:26.63
2023	World Championships	Budapest, Hungary	4th	400 m	50.13
2024	World Relays	Nassau, Bahamas	3rd	Mixed 4 × 400 m relay	3:11.53 NR
2024	World Relays	Nassau, Bahamas	7th	Women's 4 × 400 m relay	3:24.38^{1}
2024	European Championships	Rome, Italy	1st	Mixed 4 × 400 m relay	3:09.92 NR CR
2024	European Championships	Rome, Italy	2nd	400 m	49.07 NR
2024	European Championships	Rome, Italy	2nd	4 × 400 m relay	3:22.71 NR
2024	Olympic Games	Paris, France	4th	400 m	49.28
2024	Olympic Games	Paris, France	4th	4 × 400 m relay	3:19.90 NR
2025	World Relays	Guangzhou, China	2nd (Repechage)	Mixed 4 × 400 m relay	3:12.56
2025	World Relays	Guangzhou, China	1st (Repechage)	Women's 4 × 400 m relay	3:24.69
2026	European Championships	Birmingham, United Kingdom	2nd	200 m	22.28 NR
2026	World Ultimate Championship	Budapest, Hungary	11th (h)	200 m	22.81

^{1}Time from the heats; Adeleke was replaced in the final.

=== National and NCAA titles ===
- Irish Athletics Championships
  - 100 metres: 2021, 2022, 2024
  - 200 metres: 2026
- Irish Indoor Athletics Championships
  - 200 metres: 2019
- NCAA Division I Outdoor Track and Field Championships
  - 4 × 100 m relay: 2022
  - 4 X 100 m relay: 2023
  - 400 m: 2023

== Public image ==
After winning gold and silver medals at the European championships in the mixed 4 × 400 m relay and 4 × 400 m relay respectively, Taoiseach Simon Harris took to X in several posts, stating : “Rhasidat Adeleke is not only a world-class champion, she is a world-class person,”, “You [Adeleke] are class, so please do not let online cowards bring you down.", “You [Adeleke] are Ireland and Ireland could not be more proud of you.” and that Adeleke is “inspiring a generation".
