= Christopher O'Donnell (athlete) =

Irish sprinter (born 1998)

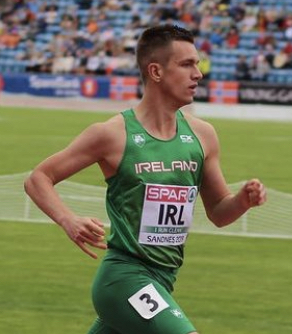
- Chris O'Donnell at the 2019 European Athletics Team Championships First League

Personal information
- Born: 17 May 1998 (age 28) Sligo, Ireland
- Education: Bsc(Hons) Sport and Exercise Science, Loughborough University
- Height: 183 cm (6 ft 0 in)
- Weight: 71 kg (157 lb)

Sport
- Country: Ireland
- Sport: Track and field
- Event: 400 m
- Club: North Sligo AC

Achievements and titles
- Personal best: 400 m: 45.26 s
Medal record
Men's athletics
Representing Ireland
European Championships
| Gold medal – first place | 2024 Rome | 4 × 400 m mixed |

Christopher O'Donnell (born 17 May 1998) is an Irish track and field athlete competing in sprinting events. He was part of the Irish Mixed 4 × 400 m team who won a gold medal at the 2024 European Athletics Championships. He represented Ireland at the Tokyo 2020 Olympic Games in the Mixed 4 × 400 m relay, where he was part of the first ever Irish team to run in an Olympic final, and competed in the same event at the Paris 2024 Olympic Games. He was also part of the team who reached the final of the 2022 and 2023 World Championships. His personal best of 45.26 seconds sits joint-3rd on the Irish all-time list and he is a record equalling five-time National 400 m champion.

== Biography ==
=== Early life and career ===
Born in Sligo, Christopher O'Donnell grew up primarily as a football player, representing his local side, Benbulben FC, and the Sligo/Leitrim Youth Schoolboys League. Operating mainly as a winger, O'Donnell was selected to represent the Sligo/Leitrim Youth Schoolboys League at the prestigious SFAI Kennedy Cup tournament in Limerick in June 2012. Described as a "formerly deft underage footballer", his raw speed on the football pitch was gaining attention, and he was encouraged to start competing in track and field sprint events for his local club, North Sligo AC. He attempted to juggle both sports for a couple of years before deciding to focus full-time on track and field at the age of 16 in 2015.

In 2014, coached by former Irish International athlete Roddy Gaynor, O'Donnell earned his first International vest at the SIAB Schools International in Cardiff, competing in the 100 metres and the 4 × 100 metres relay. In the relay, he was part of the silver medal-winning team which finished one-hundredth of a second outside the Irish U18 record. He went on to earn another International call-up that year, competing in the same events at the Celtic Games U18 International in Dublin and winning two silver medals. He won three national titles that year in the U17 category in the 100m and 200m, narrowly missing out on the Championship records in both events outdoors. In 2015, O'Donnell had his first taste of the 400 metres, and despite finishing runner-up in the national U18 indoors, his time of 50.25 was under the previous Championship record held by Brian Gregan. He went on to go one better in the outdoor equivalent, while smashing the previous record with a time of 48.70, which still stands to this day. He won double gold at the Celtic Games U18 International in the 400m and 4 × 400 m in Grangemouth.

In 2016, he was prolific at national underage level, winning the indoor and outdoor U19 and U20 400m, along with the outdoor U19 200m, where he broke the Championship record with a time of 21.59 (+0.7), which still stands. He also still holds the Ulster schools 400m record of 48.57, set on his way to winning his first senior schools 400m title. He was also part of the national U20 4 × 400 m winning team with his club. In 2017, he successfully defended his indoor U20 400m title along with the senior schools 400 m title, where he was 0.12 seconds off the Championship record. That summer saw a big breakthrough over 400m, as he won his race at the IFAM International in Oordegem in 46.92, an ‘A’ standard for the European U20 Championships in Grosseto. The Sligo athlete competed magnificently at the Championships, comfortably winning his heat before winning a competitive semi-final in a personal best time. He again beat his personal best in the final, finishing 6th in 46.54, which is currently the Irish U20 record. He gained his first senior International vest that year, finishing 2nd in the 4 × 400 m relay at the European Team Championships First League in Vaasa.

That winter, he moved his training base to Loughborough University under the guidance of Nick Dakin, who had previously coached Irish record holder David Gillick, where he trained full-time while studying for a degree in Sport and Exercise Science on a sports scholarship. In 2018, O'Donnell won his first national senior title in the 400 metres. He also represented Ireland in his first senior major Championships - the European Championships in Berlin - in the 400m and 4 × 400 m relay. In July 2019, following disappointment at the European U23 Championships and failing to improve on his personal best times under Dakin, O'Donnell returned to Sligo to be coached by Gaynor again on an interim basis until the end of the season. From there, he ended the season with four consecutive season's bests, concluding with an equal personal best. First, he successfully defended his national senior 400 m title before finishing 2nd and 3rd in the 400 m and 4 × 400 m, respectively, at the European Team Championships in Sandnes, where he was integral in helping Ireland remain in the First League. He then equalled his personal best of 46.54 from 2017, finishing runner-up in the Brussels Grand Prix.

Ahead of the 2020 season, O'Donnell would return to Loughborough to be coached by former GB youth International Michael Baker. A limited season resulted in no International Championships due to the COVID-19 pandemic. However, he still managed to improve his personal bests in the 400m and 200m, won the national 400m title (1st U23) for the third year in a row, and took bronze in the 200 m (2nd U23). The Nationals were held over two weekends and amalgamated the U23 and senior Championships together. The 2021 season saw O'Donnell become a mainstay in the Irish mixed 4 × 400 m team, where he was part of the first-ever Irish team to run in the final of the World Athletics Relays in Silesia and, in doing so, broke the national record and qualified for the Tokyo 2020 Olympic Games. In Tokyo, he anchored the team to improve further the national record on the way to becoming the first-ever Irish team to run in an Olympic Final. His season's best of 45.55 seconds would place him 3rd on the all-time list of Irish 400 m running. He parted company with Baker during the season and teamed up with Swedish sprints coach Benke Blomkvist in Loughborough following the Olympic Games.

O'Donnell moved to joint-2nd on the Irish 400m all-time list in 2022, while being part of the first-ever Irish team to run in a World Championship final, once again with the Mixed 4 × 400 m relay team, in Eugene. He was also part of the National Indoor record-breaking 4 × 400 m team that achieved a 7th-place finish at the World Indoor Championships in Belgrade. Individually in the 400m at the Championships, O'Donnell achieved a semi-final and 20th-place finish at the World Championships, while also bowing out at the semi-final stage of the European Championships in Munich with an 11th-place finish. He won his fourth national 400m title in five years in June. In 2023, he won his fifth national 400m title, equalling the most won by any Irish 400m athlete. He was again part of a record-breaking mixed 4 × 400 m team that finished 6th in the final of the World Championships in Budapest - the highest ever global finish by an Irish team outdoors. He also competed in the 400m individually at these World Championships but did not progress to the semi-final stage.

2024 provided another coaching change, with O’Donnell under the guidance of Stewart Marshall in Loughborough. He was controversially left out of the ‘strike four’ for the World Athletics Relays in The Bahamas early in the year, but was back running for the team in the European Championships in Rome. It was there that he ran the lead-off leg as Ireland stormed to victory in the 4 × 400 m Mixed Relay, winning the country's first gold medal at the European Championships since 1998. It was Ireland's second ever gold medal at the Championships after Sonia O’Sullivan and was the country's first ever relay gold at a major Championship. Their winning time was a Championship record, a National record, 0.05 seconds behind the European record, and 1.12 seconds behind the world record. He ran again with the team at the Olympic Games in Paris later that summer, but with the absence of Rhasidat Adeleke, they finished 10th in the semi-final, missing the final by two places. 2025 was a season plagued by injury and illness. O’Donnell competed at the World Athletics Relays in Guangzhou but struggled with form and fitness and did not compete at the World Championships later that year in Tokyo. He parted company with Marshall at the end of the season. His national U20 400 m record, which had stood since 2017, was finally broken. In November, he was honoured as the first-ever recipient of the Freedom of County Sligo award.

Misfortune continued in 2026 as, after a healthy winter preparation, an unexplained, chronic groin-related injury emerged at the end of April just before the season began. Despite endless rehab work throughout the summer, the injury did not progress and meant he went the whole season without a race.

== International Championships ==
| Year | Competition | Venue | Position | Event | Notes |
Representing Ireland
| 2017 | European Team Championships First League | Vaasa, Finland | 2nd | 4 × 400 m relay | 3:05.08 |
| 2017 | European U20 Championships | Grosseto, Italy | 6th | 400 m | 46,54, NU20R |
| 2018 | European Championships | Berlin, Germany | 31st (h) | 400 m | 46.81 |
| 2018 | European Championships | Berlin, Germany | 11th (sf) | 4 × 400 m relay | 3:06.55 |
| 2019 | European U23 Championships | Gävle, Sweden | 22nd (h) | 400 m | 48.04 |
| 2019 | European U23 Championships | Gävle, Sweden | 10th (sf) | 4 × 400 m relay | 3:09.02 |
| 2019 | European Team Championships First League | Sandnes, Norway | 2nd | 400 m | 46.70 |
| 2019 | European Team Championships First League | Sandnes, Norway | 1st | 4 × 400 m relay | 3:08.83 |
| 2021 | World Athletics Relays | Chorzow, Poland | 7th | 4 × 400 m relay mixed | 3:20.26 |
| 2021 | Olympic Games | Tokyo, Japan | 8th | 4 × 400 m relay mixed | 3:15.04 |
| 2022 | World Indoor Championships | Belgrade, Serbia | 7th (sf) | 4 × 400 m relay | 3:08.63 |
| 2022 | World Championships | Oregon, USA | 20th (sf) | 400 m | 46.01 |
| 2022 | World Championships | Oregon, USA | 8th | 4 × 400 m relay mixed | 3:16.86 |
| 2022 | European Championships | Munich, Germany | 11th (sf) | 400 m | 45.73 |
| 2023 | World Championships | Budapest, Hungary | 40th (h) | 400 m | 46.76 |
| 2023 | World Championships | Budapest, Hungary | 6th | 4 × 400 m relay mixed | 3:14.13 |
| 2024 | European Championships | Rome, Italy | 1st | 4 × 400 m relay mixed | 3:09.92 NR CR |
| 2024 | European Championships | Rome, Italy | 24th (sf) | 400 m | 45.69 |
| 2024 | European Championships | Rome, Italy | 10th (sf) | 4 × 400 m relay | 3:04.41 |
| 2024 | Olympic Games | Paris, France | 10th (sf) | 4 × 400 m relay mixed | 3:12.67 |
| 2025 | World Athletics Relays | Guangzhou, China | 20th (h) | 4 × 400 m relay | 3:04.42 |

== Honours ==
International

- European Mixed 4 × 400 m: 2024
- Top 8 finish at Olympic Games: 2021
- Top 8 finish at World Championships: 2022, 2023
- Top 8 finish at World Indoor Championships: 2022
- Top 8 finish at World Athletics Relays: 2021
- European Team Championships First League 400 m: 2019(2nd)
- European Team Championships First League 4 × 400 m: 2019, 2017(2nd)

National

- 400 m: 2018, 2019, 2020, 2022, 2023

International underage

- Celtic Games U18 400 m: 2015
- Celtic Games U18 4 × 400 m: 2015
- Celtic Games U16 100 m: 2014(2nd)
- Celtic Games U16 4 × 100 m: 2014(2nd)
- SIAB Schools 4 × 100 m: 2014(2nd)

National underage

- Schools 400 m: 2016, 2017
- U20 400 m: 2016
- Indoor U20 400 m: 2016, 2017
- U19 400 m: 2016
- U19 200 m: 2016
- Indoor U19 400 m: 2016
- U18 400 m: 2015
- U17 100 m: 2014
- U17 200 m: 2014
- Indoor U17 200 m: 2014

University

- BUCS 4 × 400 m: 2022

Individual

- Irish Schools' "Male" athlete of the Year: 2017
- Sligo Juvenile All-Star: 2014, 2015, 2016
- Connacht Athlete of the Year: 2022
- Connacht Sprinter of the Year: 2021, 2022
- Athletics Ireland Team of the Year: 2021, 2022, 2023
- Freedom of County Sligo: 2025
- Ocean FM ‘International’ award: 2024

== Records ==
- National Mixed 4 × 400 m (3:09.92): 2024
- National Indoor 4 × 400 m (3:08.63): 2022
- Connacht 400 m (45.26): 2022
- North Sligo AC 200 m (21.09): 2022
- North Sligo AC 400 m (45.26): 2022
- BUCS 4 × 400 m Championship (3:05.11): 2022
- National U19 200 m Championship (21.59): 2016
- National U18 400 m Championship (48.70): 2015
- Ulster Schools 400 m Championship (48.57): 2016
- Connacht Schools 400 m Championship (48.92): 2017

== Personal bests ==
- 100 metres – 10.73 (+0.6 m/s, Lee Valley, 2024)
- 200 metres – 21.09 (-1.2 m/s, Kettering, 2022), 20.94 (+2.3 m/s, Lee Valley, 2024)*
- 400 metres - 45.26 (Madrid, 2022)
- 600 metres – 1:22.55i (Athlone, 2016)
- 4 × 100 metres relay - 42.19 (Cardiff, 2014)
- 4 × 400 metres relay - 3:04.41 (Rome, 2024)
- Mixed 4 × 400 metres relay - 3:09.92 (Rome, 2024)

== Season's bests ==
| Year | 100 metres | 200 metres | 400 metres | 600 metres | 4 × 100 metres | 4 × 400 metres | 4 × 400 metres Mixed |
|---|---|---|---|---|---|---|---|
| 2014 | 11.05 | 22.21 | - | - | 42.19 | - | - |
| 2015 (U18) | 11.33 | 22.33 | 48.70 | - | - | 3:20.18 | - |
| 2016 | 11.61 | 21.59 | 48.07 | 1:22.55i | - | 3:29.31 | - |
| 2017 (U20) | 10.89 | 21.57 | 46.54 (NU20R) | - | - | 3:05.08 | - |
| 2018 | - | 21.75 | 46.81 | - | - | 3:06.55 | - |
| 2019 | - | 21.85 | 46.54 | - | - | 3:08.83 | - |
| 2020 (U23) | 10.99 | 21.17 | 46.16 | - | - | - | - |
| 2021 | 10.83 | 21.24 | 45.55 | - | - | - | 3:12.88 |
| 2022 | 10.86 | 21.09 , 21.07* | 45.26 | - | - | 3:05.11 | 3:13.88 |
| 2023 | - | 21.35 | 45.73 | - | - | - | 3:13.90 |
| 2024 | 10.73 | 21.41, 20.94* | 45.69 | - | - | 3.04.41 | 3.09.92 (NR) |
| 2025 | 11.00, 10.90* | 21.47 | 46.27 | - | - | 3.04.42 | - |
| 2026 | - | 21.99i | - | - | - | - | - |
