= Eric Favors =

Irish shot putter (born 1996)

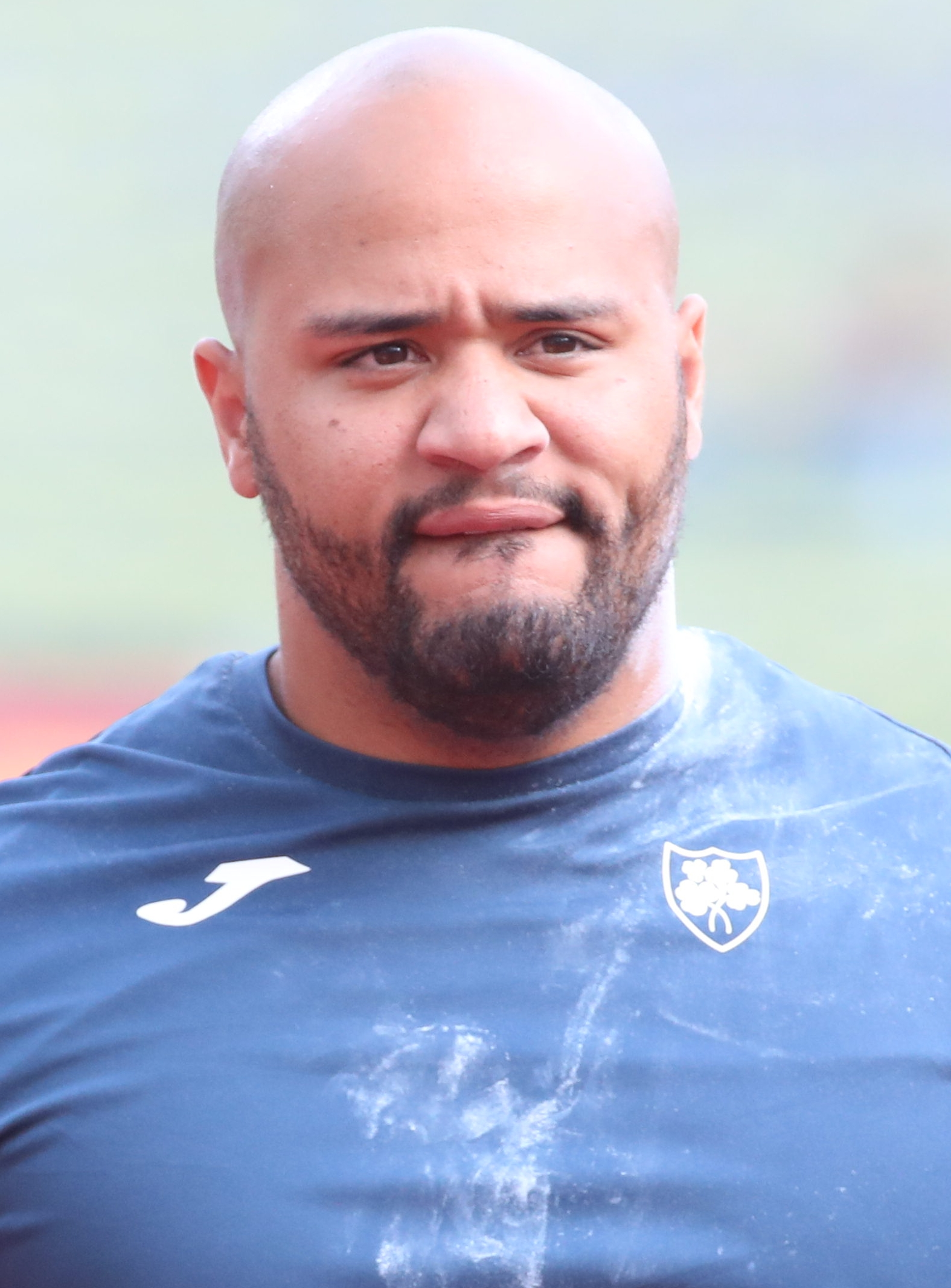
- Favors in 2022

Personal information
- Born: 16 November 1996 (age 29) Nyack, New York, U.S.

Sport
- Country: Ireland
- Sport: Athletics
- Event: Shot put
Medal record
Athletics
Representing Ireland
Bronze medal – third place	2026 Nicosia	Shot put

Eric Favors (born 16 November 1996) is an American-born athlete who competes in the shot put for Ireland. He currently holds the Irish national record in the event.

== Career ==
=== Summer Universiade 2019 ===
In 2019, Favors competed at the Summer Universiade, where he finished 10th in the shot put.

=== 2022 season ===
In 2022, Favors finished 10th overall at the European Throwing Cup, recording a best mark of 19.70 meters. He also participated in the European Athletics Championships, where he placed 15th in the qualification round, failing to advance to the final. Later that year, he competed in his first World Championships in Eugene, Oregon, finishing 20th out of 30 participants with a best throw of 19.76 meters, again not advancing to the final.

=== 2023 season ===
In 2023, Favors improved his performance at the European Throwing Cup, finishing 5th with a throw of 20.66 meters. He also played a significant role in Ireland's promotion at the 2023 European Games by winning the shot put event in Division 3, although he did not win a medal. At his second World Championships, Favors finished 23rd out of 37 competitors.

=== 2024 season and Paris Olympics ===
In April 2024 Eric Broke the National Record throwing 20.93m. Favors narrowly missed advancing to the final at the European Championships, finishing 14th, one place better than his 2022 performance. Despite not meeting the entry standards, he qualified for the 2024 Summer Olympics in Paris based on his Olympic rankings. He finished 18th in the shot put with a best mark of 19.02 meters.

== Major Championship Results ==
Representing Ireland
Year	Competition	Venue	Position	Mark
2019	Summer Universiade	Naples, Italy	9th	19.20
2022	European Throwing Cup	Leiria, Portugal	10th	19.70
2022	World Championships	Eugene, United States	20th (q)	19.76
2022	European Championships	Munich, Germany	15th (q)	19.71
2023	European Throwing Cup	Leiria, Portugal	5th	20.66
2023	World Championships	Budapest, Hungary	23rd (q)	19.65
2024	European Championships	Rome, Italy	14th (q)	19.60
2024	Olympic Games	Paris, France	27th (q)	19.02
2025	European Throwing Cup	Nicosia, Cyprus	9th	19.10
2025	World Championships	Tokyo, Japan	28th (q)	19.19
2026	European Throwing Cup	Nicosia, Cyprus	Bronze medal	19.68
2026	European Championships	Paris, France	10th	19.79

== Personal life ==
Eric Favors is eligible to represent Ireland due to his family connections in Ballina, County Mayo. Before focusing on athletics, Favors played American football in high school. He also maintains a YouTube channel with 14.6k subscribers, where he shares videos on shot put workouts and training sessions.
