= Phil Healy =

Irish sprinter (born 1994)

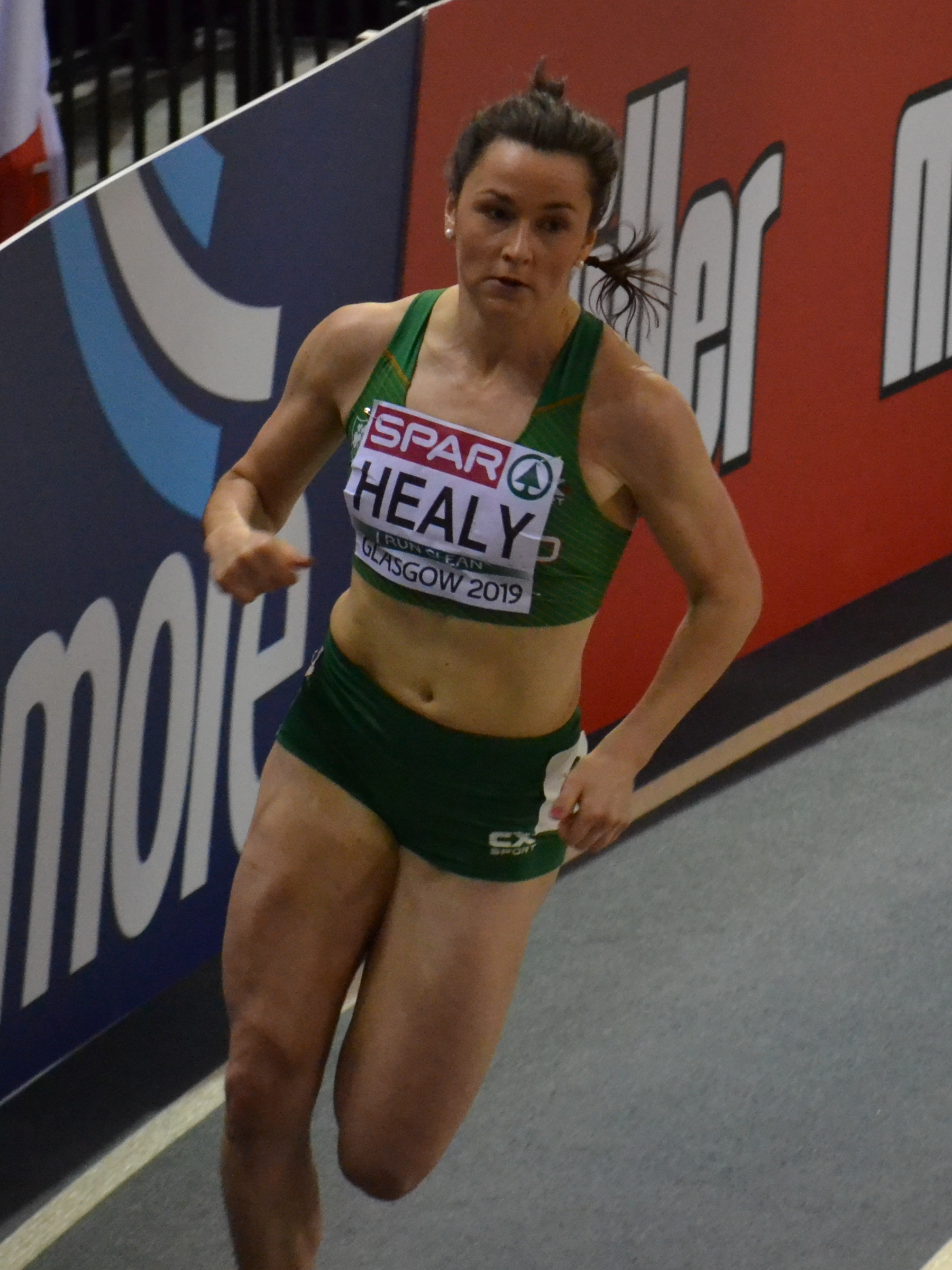

Personal information
- Full name: Philomena Healy
- Nationality: Irish
- Born: 19 November 1994 (age 31) Ballineen, County Cork, Ireland

Sport
- Sport: Athletics
- Events: 100 m, 200 m, 400 m
- Club: Bandon A.C
Medal record
Women's athletics
Representing Ireland
European Championships
Silver medal – second place	2024 Rome	4×400 m relay

Philomena Healy (born 19 November 1994) is an Irish athlete competing in sprinting events. From Ballineen in County Cork, her sister Joan Healy is also a sprinter.

== Career ==
A member of Bandon Athletics Club, Healy reportedly "began to fully focus on [athletics]" as a teenager. A video of Phil Healy winning the final leg of the 4 x 400 metre Irish University Championships in 2016 went viral around the world. Her winning run has been described as one of the best athletics comebacks of all time. As she turns into the homestretch, having closed much of an 80-metre gap with the lead runners, the commentator is heard to shout "UCC from the depths of hell are powering through".

She set an Irish 200m national record in July 2018. In the 2018 European Championships, she placed fourth with a time of 23.23.

In a team which included Rhasidat Adeleke, Sophie Becker and Sharlene Mawdsley, Healy won a silver medal in the 4 × 400 metres relay at the 2024 European Championships. Healy was also a member of the Irish team that came fourth in the 4 × 400 metres event at the 2024 Paris Olympics.

Healy announced her retirement from international athletics in June 2026.

== International competitions ==
Year	Competition	Venue	Position	Event	Notes
Representing Ireland
2013	European Junior Championships	Rieti, Italy	4th	100 m	11.96
2013	European Junior Championships	Rieti, Italy	14th (h)	200 m	24.44
2014	European Championships	Zürich, Switzerland	26th (h)	100 m	11.53
2014	European Championships	Zürich, Switzerland	10th (h)	4 × 100 m relay	43.84
2015	IAAF World Relays	Nassau, Bahamas	17th (h)	4 × 100 m relay	45.38
2015	IAAF World Relays	Nassau, Bahamas	5th	4 × 200 m relay	1:36.90
2015	European U23 Championships	Tallinn, Estonia	12th (h)	100 m	11.81
2015	European U23 Championships	Tallinn, Estonia	5th (h)	4 × 100 m relay	44.68^{1}
2016	European Championships	Amsterdam, Netherlands	12th (h)	4 × 100 m relay	44.29
2016	European Championships	Amsterdam, Netherlands	15th (h)	4 × 400 m relay	3:34.02
2017	European Indoor Championships	Belgrade, Serbia	14th (sf)	60 m	7.40
2017	European Indoor Championships	Belgrade, Serbia	26th (h)	400 m	54.80
2017	Universiade	Taipei, Taiwan	7th	200 m	23.81
2018	World Indoor Championships	Birmingham, United Kingdom	12th (sf)	400 m	53.26
2018	European Championships	Berlin, Germany	20th (sf)	100 m	11.46
2018	European Championships	Berlin, Germany	11th (sf)	200 m	23.23
2018	European Championships	Berlin, Germany	9th (h)	4 × 100 m relay	43.80
2019	European Indoor Championships	Glasgow, United Kingdom	15th (sf)	400 m	53.65
2019	Universiade	Naples, Italy	6th	200 m	23.44
2019	World Championships	Doha, Qatar	37th (h)	200 m	23.56
2021	European Indoor Championships	Toruń, Poland	4th	400 m	51.94
2021	Olympic Games	Tokyo, Japan	26th (h)	200 m	23.21
2021	Olympic Games	Tokyo, Japan	24th (h)	400 m	51.98
2021	Olympic Games	Tokyo, Japan	8th	4 × 400 m mixed relay	3:15.04
2022	World Indoor Championships	Belgrade, Serbia	11th (sf)	400 m	52.40
2022	World Indoor Championships	Belgrade, Serbia	7th (h)	4 × 400 m relay	3:30.97
2022	European Championships	Munich, Germany	19th (h)	400 m	53.10
2022	European Championships	Munich, Germany	6th	4 × 400 m relay	3:26.63
2023	European Indoor Championships	Istanbul, Turkey	5th	4 × 400 m relay	3:32.61
2024	World Indoor Championships	Glasgow, United Kingdom	5th	4 × 400 m relay	3:28.92
2024	European Championships	Rome, Italy	15th (h)	200 m	23.51
2024	European Championships	Rome, Italy	2nd	4 × 400 m relay	3:22.71 NR
2024	Olympic Games	Paris, France	4th	4 × 400 m relay	3:19.90 NR
2025	World Relays	Guangzhou, China	8th	4 × 400 m mixed relay	3:19.64

^{1}Did not finish in the final

== Personal bests ==
Outdoor

- 100 metres – 11.28 (+2.0 m/s, Dublin 2018)
- 200 metres – 22.99 (0.0 m/s, Cork 2018)
- 400 metres – 51.50 (Belfast 2021)

Indoor

- 60 metres – 7.31 (Athlone 2017)
- 200 metres – 23.10 (Athlone 2020)
- 400 metres – 51.94 (Torun 2021)
