= Ireland at the 2006 European Athletics Championships =

Sporting event delegation

Ireland competed at the 2006 European Athletics Championships held in Sweden. It won one silver medal. Derval O'Rourke's silver medal, combined with a new national record, in the 100 metre hurdles was the highlight of the championship, which also saw a new women's 4 × 100 m relay national record and a national record equalling performance from Deirdre Ryan in the high jump.

== Results by event ==
=== Men's competition ===
Men's 200 m

- Paul Brizzell
  1. Round 1 — 20.84
  2. Round 2 — DNF
- Paul Hession
  1. Round 1 — 20.81
  2. Round 2 — 20.80
  3. Semi-Final — 21.09 (did not advance)
- Gary Ryan
  1. Round 1 — 21.14 (did not advance)

Men's 400 m

- Paul "Junior" McKee
  1. Round 1 — 46.48 (did not advance)
- David Gillick
  1. Round 1 — 46.16
  2. Semi-Final — 46.84 (did not advance)
- David McCarthy
  1. Round 1 — 46.53 (did not advance)

Men's 800 m

- David Campbell
  1. Round 1 — 01:48.70 (did not advance)
- Thomas Chamney
  1. Round 1 — 01:50.12 (did not advance)

Men's 1,500 m

- James Nolan
  1. Semi-Final — 03:49.94 (did not advance)
- Liam Reale
  1. Semi-Final — 03:41.97
  2. Final — 03:42.65 (8th place)

Men's 5,000 m

- Alistair Cragg
  1. Semi-Final — 13:50.12
  2. Final — DNF

Men's 10,000 m

- Martin Fagan
  1. Round 1 — 28:54.04 (11th place)

Men's 4 × 400 m

- Paul McKee, Brian Doyle, David Gillick, David McCarthy
  1. Semi-Final — 03:04.59
  2. Final — 03:05.57 (9th place)

=== Women's competition ===
Women's 100 m

- Anna Boyle
  1. Round 1 — 11.60 (did not advance)
- Emily Maher
  1. Round 1 — DNS

Women's 200 m

- Anna Boyle
  1. Round 1 — 23.94 (did not advance)
- Ciara Sheehy
  1. Round 1 — DNF

Women's 400 m

- Joanne Cuddihy
  1. Round 1 — 51.41
  2. Semi-Final — 51.09 (PB)
  3. Final — 51.46 (8th place)

Women's 1,500 m

- Aoife Byrne
  1. Semi-Final — 4:16.07 (did not advance)

Women's 5,000 m

- Mary Cullen
  1. Final — 15:25.80 (PB) (12th Place)
- Marie Davenport
  1. Final — DNF

Women's 10,000 m

- Marie Davenport
  1. Final — 33:05.48 (22nd place)

Women's 100 m Hurdles

- Derval O'Rourke
  1. Round 1 — 13.03
  2. Semi final — 12.94
  3. Final — 12.72 NR (2nd - Silver medal)

Women's 3000 m Steeplechase

- Roísín McGettigan
  1. Semi-Final — 09:47.31 (did not advance)
- Fionnuala Britton
  1. Semi-Final — 09:49.20 (PB) (did not advance)

Women's 4 × 100 m

- Derval O'Rourke, Joanne Cuddihy, Ailis McSweeney and Anna Boyle
  1. Semi-Final — 44.38 (NR) (did not advance)

Women's High Jump

- Deirdre Ryan
  1. Qualifying — 1.92 m (=NR)
  2. Final — 1.84 m (13th place)

Women's Hammer Throw

- Eileen O'Keefe
  1. Qualifying — 65.07 m (did not advance)

2006 Gothenburg	Gold	Silver	Bronze	Total
Ireland (IRL)	0	1	0	1

== Competitors ==
=== Men ===
200 m: Paul Hession, Paul Brizzel, Gary Ryan
400 m: David Gillick, David McCarthy, Paul McKee
800 m: David Campbell, Thomas Chamney
1,500 m: James Nolan, Liam Reale
5,000 m: Martin Fagan, Alistair Cragg
10,000: Martin Fagan
4 × 400 m Relay: David Gillick, David McCarthy, Paul McKee, Antoine Burke, Brian Doyle, Bryan Murphy

=== Women ===
100 m: Anna Boyle, Emily Maher
200 m: Ciara Sheehy, Joanne Cuddihy, Emily Maher, Anna Boyle
400 m: Joanne Cuddihy, Michelle Carey
1,500 m: Aoife Byrne
5,000 m: Marie Davenport, Mary Cullen
10,000 m: Marie Davenport
3,000 m Steeplechase: Roisin McGettigan, Fionnuala Britton
100 m Hurdles: Derval O'Rourke
400 m Hurdles: Michelle Carey
4 × 100 m Relay: Anna Boyle, Ciara Sheehy, Joanne Cuddihy, Derval O'Rourke, Emily Maher, Ailis McSweeney

High Jump: Deirdre Ryan
Hammer: Eileen O'Keeffe
