= Ireland at the 2012 European Athletics Championships =

Ireland was represented by 24 athletes at the 2012 European Athletics Championships hold in Helsinki, Finland, between 26 June – 1 July 2012.

== Results ==
=== Men ===
==== Track ====
Event	Athletes	Heats		Semifinal		Final	
Event	Athletes	Result	Rank	Result	Rank	Result	Rank
100 m	Jason Smyth	10.47	18	10.52	20	DNQ	
200 m	Steven Colvert	Disqualified		DNQ			
200 m	Paul Hession	20.75	2 Q	20.84	4 q	21.27	8
400 m	Brian Gregan	45.63	1 Q	45.76	3 Q	46.04	6
1500 m	Paul Robinson	3:47.26	21	—		DNQ	
10000 m	Mark Kenneally	—				29.10.55	15
10000 m	David Rooney	—				29:57.82 SB	20
110 m hurdles	Ben Reynolds	DNS					
400 m hurdles	Thomas Barr	50.59	13	50.22	13	DNQ	
400 m hurdles	Jason Harvey	51.83	29	DNQ			
4 × 400 m relay	Brian Murphy; David Gillick; Tim Crowe; Jason Harvey	Disqualified		—		DNQ	

=== Women ===
==== Track ====
Event	Athletes	Heats		Semifinal		Final	
Event	Athletes	Result	Rank	Result	Rank	Result	Rank
100 m	Amy Foster	11.58	21	DNQ			
200 m	Amy Foster	24.04	26	DNQ			
400 m	Joanne Cuddihy	Disqualified		DNQ			
1500 m	Ciara Mageean	12	4:19.23	—		DNQ	
1500 m	Orla Drumm	12	4:19.61	—		DNQ	
10000 m	Fionnuala Britton	—				32:05.54	4
400 m hurdles	Jessie Barr	56.30	9 Q	55.93 PB	8 q	56.83	8
3000 m steeplechase	Stephanie Reilly	9:44.15	13 q	—		9:53.90	12
4 × 400 m relay	Claire Bergin; Joanne Cuddihy; Marian Heffernan; Michelle Carey	Disqualified		—		DNQ	

==== Field ====
Event	Athletes	Qualification		Final	
Event	Athletes	Result	Rank	Result	Rank
Pole vault	Tori Pena	4.35	16	DNQ	
