= Sophie Becker =

Irish sprinter (born 1997)

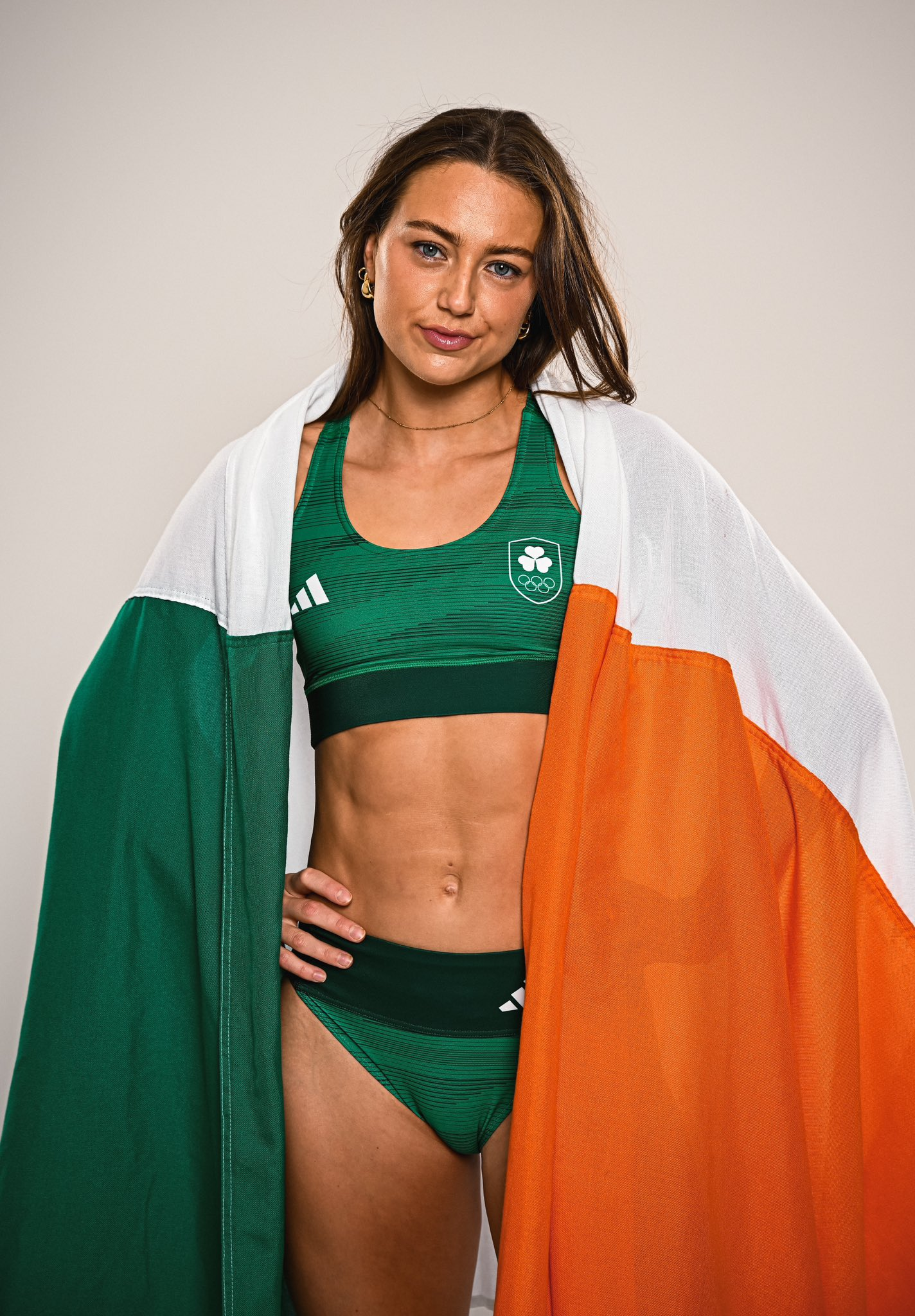
- Sophie Becker

Personal information
- Nationality: Irish
- Born: 16 May 1997 (age 29) County Wexford, Ireland
- Education: Dublin City University (BSc)

Sport
- Sport: Athletics
- Event: 400 metres

Achievements and titles
- Personal bests: 400m: 51.13 (Belfast, 2024)
Medal record
Women's athletics
Representing Ireland
European Championships
Silver medal – second place	2024 Rome	4×400 m relay
World Athletics Relays
Silver medal – second place	2021 Chorzów	4×200 m relay

Sophie Becker (born 16 May 1997) is an Irish sprinter specialising in the 400 metres. Becker has represented Ireland at the Olympic Games and World Championships, and won a silver medal at the 2024 European Athletics Championships as part of the women's 4 x 400 metres relay team which set a new Irish national record.

== Early life and education ==
Becker is from Ballykelly in County Wexford where she competed in underage Gaelic football for Horeswood GAA. She later attended St Mary's Secondary School in New Ross.

She graduated with a degree in genetics and cell biology from Dublin City University.

== Career ==
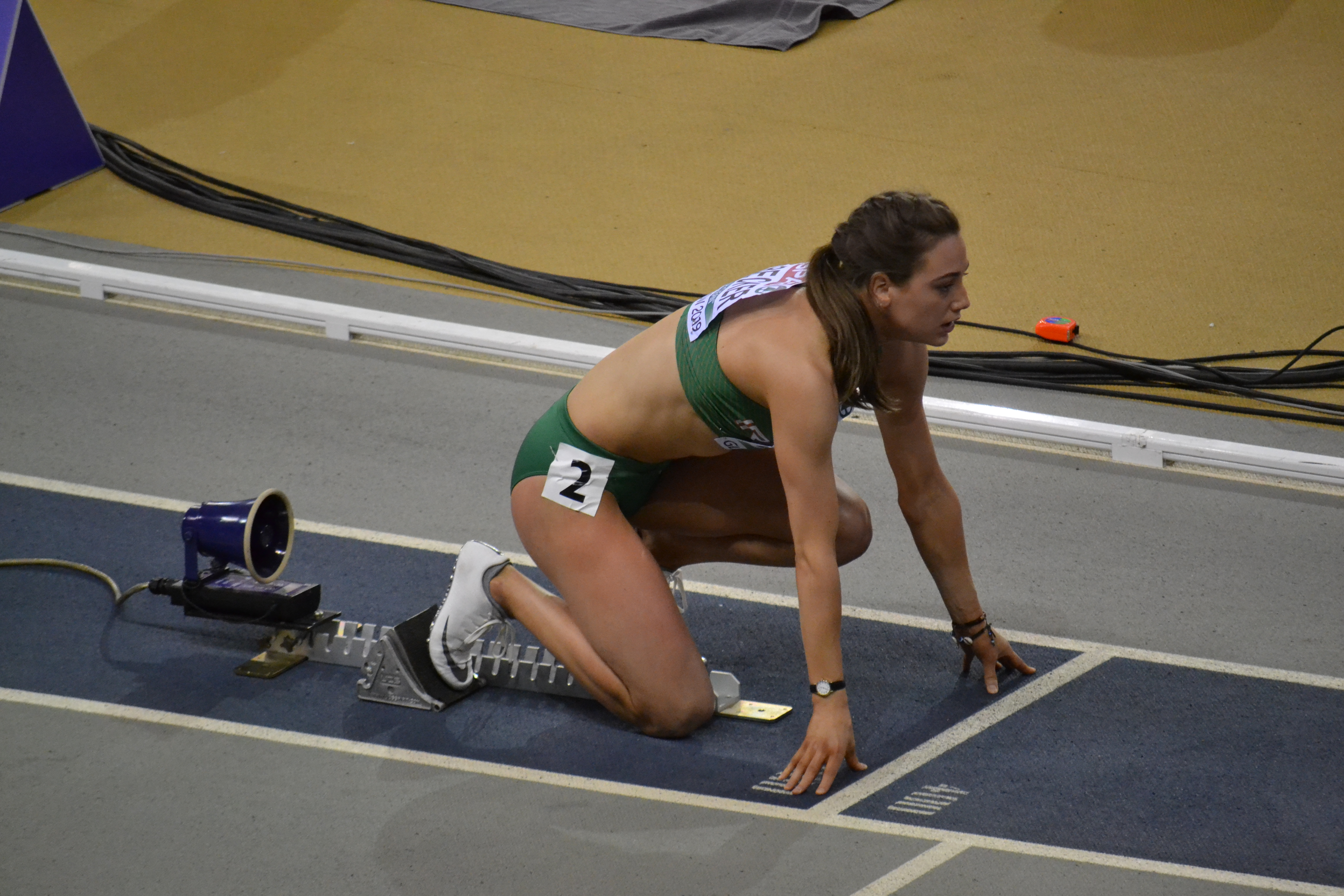
Sophie Becker in 2019

She competed in the women's 400 metres event at the 2021 European Athletics Indoor Championships. She took part in the mixed 4 × 400 metres relay event at the delayed 2020 Summer Olympics.

She was part of the Irish women's relay team that qualified for the final of the women's 4 × 400 m relay in Budapest at the 2023 World Athletics Championships.

She ran at the 2024 World Athletics Indoor Championships as part of the Irish 4 × 400 m relay team which reached the final in Glasgow. She ran as part of the Irish 4 × 400 m relay team at the 2024 World Relays Championships in Nassau, Bahamas. She finished third in the 400 metres at the 2024 BAUHAUS-galan in Stockholm on 2 June 2024.

She was selected for the Ireland team for the 2024 European Athletics Championships to run the individual 400 metres and the relay. The women's 4 × 400 m relay team qualified fastest for the final, with the team before ultimately going on to win the silver medal in a national record time of 3:22.71. Later that month, she won the Irish Championships 400 metres title in Dublin.

In July 2024, she qualified for the individual 400 metres at the 2024 Paris Olympics. She also competed in the women's and mixed 4 × 400 m relay at the Games.

She was selected for the Irish relay pool for the 2025 World Athletics Relays in Guangzhou, China in May 2025, where they failed to make it to the finals. She won the 400m at the 2025 Irish Athletics Championships.

She competed at the 2025 World Athletics Championships in Tokyo, Japan, in the women's 400 metres. She also ran in the women's x 400 metres relay.

On 28 February, Becker won her third national indoor title winning the 200 metres at the Irish Indoor Championships in 23.43. In May, she ran at the 2026 World Athletics Relays in the mixed 4 × 400 metres relay in Gaborone, Botswana. Competing at the 2026 European Athletics Championships in Birmingham, England, in August, she was a semi-finalist in the 400 metres.
