= Romania at the 2026 European Athletics Championships =

- Flag of Romania
- WA code: ROU

in Birmingham, United Kingdom 10–16 August 2026
- Competitors: 13 (7 men and 6 women)
- Medals: Gold 0 Silver 0 Bronze 0 Total 0

European Athletics Championships appearances
- 1934; 1938; 1946; 1950; 1954; 1958; 1962; 1966; 1969; 1971; 1974; 1978; 1982; 1986; 1990; 1994; 1998; 2002; 2006; 2010; 2012; 2014; 2016; 2018; 2022; 2024; 2026

Romania competed at the 2026 European Athletics Championships in Birmingham, United Kingdom from 10–16 August 2026.

== Results ==
Romania entered the following athletes.

Key

- Q = Qualified for the next round
- q = Qualified for the next round as a fastest loser or, in field events, by position without achieving the qualifying target
- NR = National record
- PB = Personal best
- SB = Season best
- N/A = Round not applicable for the event

Track and road events

Athlete	Event	Heat		Semifinal		Final	
Athlete	Event	Result	Rank	Result	Rank	Result	Rank
Mihai Dringo	Men's 400 m	46.03	12 q	46.91	8	Did not advance	
Nicolae Soare	Men's marathon	—N/a					
Alin Anton	Men's 110 m hurdles	14.12	16	Did not advance			
Mihaela Blaga	Women's 3000 m steeplechase	10:12.15	16	—N/a		Did not advance	

Field events
Men

Athlete	Event	Qualification		Final	
Athlete	Event	Distance	Position	Distance	Position
Valentin Androne	High jump	NM		Did not advance	
Gabriel Bitan	Long jump	7.87	14	Did not advance	
Andrei Toader	Shot put	19.76	10 q	20.80	5
Alin Firfirică	Discus throw	61.85	14	Did not advance	

Women

Athlete	Event	Qualification		Final	
Athlete	Event	Distance	Position	Distance	Position
Alina Rotaru-Kottmann	Long jump				
Ramona Elena Verman	Long jump				
Diana Ana Maria Ion	Triple jump	NM		Did not advance	
Elena Andreea Taloș	Triple jump	14.03	12 q	14.23	7
