= Croatia at the 2022 European Athletics Championships =

- Flag of Croatia
- WA code: CRO
- National federation: Croatian Athletics Federation

in Munich, Germany 15 August 2022 – 21 August 2022
- Competitors: 11 (4 men and 7 women) in 9 events
- Medals Ranked 11th: Gold 2 Silver 1 Bronze 0 Total 3

European Athletics Championships appearances
- 1994; 1998; 2002; 2006; 2010; 2012; 2014; 2016; 2018; 2022; 2024; 2026

Croatia competed at the 2022 European Athletics Championships in Munich, Germany, between 15 and 21 August 2022, with 11 athletes, 4 male and 7 female. Croatian athletes won three medals, two gold (Sandra Perković in discus throw, Filip Mihaljević in shot put) and one silver (Matea Parlov Koštro in marathon).

== Medallists ==
Medal	Name	Event	Date
Gold	Filip Mihaljević	Men's shot put	15 August
Gold	Sandra Perković	Women's discus throw	16 August
Silver	Matea Parlov Koštro	Women's marathon	15 August

== Results ==
Croatia entered the following athletes.

Key

- Q = Qualified for the next round
- q = Qualified for the next round as a fastest loser or, in field events, by position without achieving the qualifying target
- NR = National record
- PB = Personal best
- SB = Season best
- N/A = Round not applicable for the event

=== Men ===
Field events

Athletes	Event	Qualification		Final	
Athletes	Event	Distance	Position	Distance	Position
Marko Čeko	Long jump	7.74	11 q	7.77	8
Martin Marković	Discus throw	60.30	18	did not advance	
Filip Mihaljević	Shot put	20.30	9 q	21.88 SB	1st place, gold medalist(s)
Filip Pravdica	Long jump	6.95	20	did not advance	

=== Women ===
Track and road

Athletes	Event	Heats		Semifinal		Final	
Athletes	Event	Result	Rank	Result	Rank	Result	Rank
Ivana Lončarek	100 m hurdles	13.50	16	did not advance			
Matea Parlov Koštro	Marathon	—N/a				2:28:42	2nd place, silver medalist(s)
Ana Štefulj	Marathon	—N/a				did not finish	

Field events

Athletes	Event	Qualification		Final	
Athletes	Event	Distance	Position	Distance	Position
Paola Borović	Triple jump	NM		did not advance	
Sara Kolak	Javelin throw	57.31	14	did not advance	
Sandra Perković	Discus throw	65.94	1 Q	67.95	1st place, gold medalist(s)
Marija Tolj	Discus throw	62.51	6 q	63.37	6
