= Portugal at the 2022 European Athletics Championships =

- Flag of Portugal
- WA code: POR
- National federation: Portuguese Athletics Federation

in Munich, Germany 15 August 2022 – 21 August 2022
- Competitors: 43 (24 men and 19 women) in 26 events
- Medals Ranked 18th: Gold 1 Silver 1 Bronze 0 Total 2

European Athletics Championships appearances
- 1934; 1938; 1946; 1950; 1954; 1958; 1962; 1966; 1969; 1971; 1974; 1978; 1982; 1986; 1990; 1994; 1998; 2002; 2006; 2010; 2012; 2014; 2016; 2018; 2022; 2024; 2026

Portugal competed at the 2022 European Athletics Championships in Munich, Germany, between 15 and 21 August 2022

== Medallists ==
Medal	Name	Event	Date
Gold	Pedro Pichardo	Men's triple jump	17 August
Silver	Auriol Dongmo	Women's shot put	15 August

== Results ==
Portugal entered the following athletes.

Key

- Q = Qualified for the next round
- q = Qualified for the next round as a fastest loser or, in field events, by position without achieving the qualifying target
- NR = National record
- PB = Personal best
- SB = Season best
- N/A = Round not applicable for the event

=== Men ===
Track and road events

Athlete	Event	Heat		Semifinal		Final	
Athlete	Event	Result	Rank	Result	Rank	Result	Rank
Carlos Nascimento	100 metres	10.33	8 q	10.40	21	did not advance	
João Coelho	400 metres	45.78	9 q	45.64	8	did not advance	
Isaac Nader	1500 metres	3:44.59	24	—N/a		did not advance	
Samuel Barata	10,000 metres	—N/a				DNF	
Rui Pinto	Marathon	—N/a				2:15:43	20
Fábio Oliveira	Marathon	—N/a				2:18:02	34
Luís Saraiva	Marathon	—N/a				2:21:23	48
Hermano Ferreira	Marathon	—N/a				2:24:21	55
Abdel Kader Larrinaga	110 metres hurdles	13.76	8 Q	13.81	20	did not advance	
João Vítor de Oliveira	110 metres hurdles	13.90	16 Q	13.92	21	did not advance	
Etson Barros	3000 metres steeplechase	8:38.04	16	—N/a		did not advance	
Simão Bastos	3000 metres steeplechase	8:57.27	27	—N/a		did not advance	
Miguel Borges	3000 metres steeplechase	DNF		—N/a		did not advance	
Hélder Santos	20 km walk	—N/a				1:28:43	21
Paulo Martins	20 km walk	—N/a				1:31:09	25
João Vieira	20 km walk	—N/a				DNS	
João Coelho; Mauro Pereira; Ericsson Tavares; Ricardo dos Santos	4 × 400 metres relay	3:03.59 NR	10	—N/a		did not advance	

Field events

Athlete	Event	Qualification		Final	
Athlete	Event	Distance	Position	Distance	Position
Gerson Baldé	High jump	2.12	19	did not advance	
Pedro Pichardo	Triple jump	17.36	1 Q	17.50	1st place, gold medalist(s)
Tiago Pereira	Triple jump	16.36	10 q	16.60	8
Tsanko Arnaudov	Shot put	19.42	18	did not advance	
Leandro Ramos	Javelin throw	72.90	20	did not advance	

=== Women ===
Track and road events

Athlete	Event	Heat		Semifinal		Final	
Athlete	Event	Result	Rank	Result	Rank	Result	Rank
Lorène Bazolo	100 metres	11.48	11 Q	11.42	13	did not advance	
Lorène Bazolo	200 metres	23.12	6 Q	23.43	14	did not advance	
Cátia Azevedo	400 metres	51.63	4 Q	51.42	11	did not advance	
Marta Pen	1500 metres	4:07.82	19	—N/a		did not advance	
Susana Cunha	Marathon	—N/a				2:51:14	50
Sara Moreira	Marathon	—N/a				DNF	
Solange Jesús	Marathon	—N/a				DNF	
Olimpia Barbosa	100 metres hurdles	13.29	7 q	13.57	24	did not advance	
Vera Barbosa	400 metres hurdles	57.10	16	did not advance			
Ana Cabecinha	20 km walk	—N/a				1:31:56	8
Carolina Costa	20 km walk	—N/a				1:35:36 PB	14
Joana Pontes	20 km walk	—N/a				DQ	
Inês Henriques	35 km walk	—N/a				2:58:34	9
Vitória Oliveira	35 km walk	—N/a				DNF	

Field events

Athlete	Event	Qualification		Final	
Athlete	Event	Distance	Position	Distance	Position
Evelise Veiga	Long jump	6.17	19	did not advance	
Patrícia Mamona	Triple jump	14.45 SB	2 Q	14.41	5
Auriol Dongmo	Shot put	19.32	1 Q	19.82 NR	2nd place, silver medalist(s)
Jessica Inchude	Shot put	17.64	11 q	17.93	9
Liliana Cá	Discus throw	65.21 SB	2 Q	63.67	5
Irina Rodrigues	Discus throw	57.04	12 q	56.23	11
