= Switzerland at the 2022 European Athletics Championships =

- Flag of Switzerland
- WA code: SUI
- National federation: Swiss Athletics Federation

in Munich, Germany 15−21 August 2022
- Competitors: 45 (23 men and 22 women) in 25 events
- Medals Ranked 12th: Gold 1 Silver 3 Bronze 2 Total 6

European Athletics Championships appearances
- 1934; 1938; 1946; 1950; 1954; 1958; 1962; 1966; 1969; 1971; 1974; 1978; 1982; 1986; 1990; 1994; 1998; 2002; 2006; 2010; 2012; 2014; 2016; 2018; 2022; 2024; 2026

Switzerland competed at the 2022 European Athletics Championships in Munich, Germany, between 15 and 21 August 2022

== Medallists ==
Medal	Name	Event	Date
Gold	Mujinga Kambundji	Women's 200 metres	19 August
Silver	Mujinga Kambundji	Women's 100 metres	16 August
Silver	Simon Ehammer	Men's decathlon	16 August
Silver	Ricky Petrucciani	Men's 400 metres	17 August
Bronze	Annik Kälin	Women's heptathlon	18 August
Bronze	Ditaji Kambundji	Women's 100 metres hurdles	21 August

== Results ==
Switzerland entered the following athletes.

Key

- Q = Qualified for the next round
- q = Qualified for the next round as a fastest loser or, in field events, by position without achieving the qualifying target
- NR = National record
- PB = Personal best
- SB = Season best
- N/A = Round not applicable for the event

=== Men ===
Track and road events

Athlete	Event	Heat		Semifinal		Final	
Athlete	Event	Result	Rank	Result	Rank	Result	Rank
Pascal Mancini	100 metres	10.24	3 Q	10.23	14	did not advance	
William Reais	200 metres	20.66 SB	5 Q	20.82	18	did not advance	
Felix Svensson	200 metres	20.90	=15	did not advance			
Ricky Petrucciani	400 metres	45.26 SB	2 Q	45.55	6 Q	45.03 SB	2nd place, silver medalist(s)
Lionel Spitz	400 metres	45.46 PB	4 Q	45.56	7 q	45.66	7
Jonas Raess	5000 metres	—N/a				13:36.18	15
Adrian Lehmann	Marathon	—N/a				2:15:57 SB	23
Julien Lyon	Marathon	—N/a				did not finish	
Patrik Wägeli	Marathon	—N/a				2:18:46 SB	37
Finley Gaio	110 metres hurdles	13.46 PB	1 Q	13.50	8 q	13.50	5
Mathieu Jaquet	110 metres hurdles	13.91	18	did not advance			
Jason Joseph	110 metres hurdles	Bye		13.45	5 Q	13.35	4
Julien Bonvin	400 metres hurdles	49.41	3 Q	49.10 PB	6 q	50.24	7
Dany Brand	400 metres hurdles	50.30	13	did not advance			
Nahom Yirga	400 metres hurdles	51.55	22	did not advance			
Michael Curti	3000 metres steeplechase	8:56.46	26	—N/a		did not advance	
Pascal Mancini; Bradley Lestrade; Felix Svensson; William Reais; Daniel Löhrer^{[a]}	4 × 100 metres relay	39.03 SB	9 Q	—N/a		38.36 NR	5
Lionel Spitz; Charles Devantay; Filippo Moggi; Ricky Petrucciani	4 × 400 metres relay	did not finish		—N/a		did not advance	

Field events

Athlete	Event	Qualification		Final	
Athlete	Event	Distance	Position	Distance	Position
Dominik Alberto	Pole vault	5.65 SB	11 q	NM	
Benjamin Gföhler	Long jump	7.49	17	did not advance	

Combined events – Decathlon

Athlete	Event	100 m	LJ	SP	HJ	400 m	110H	DT	PV	JT	1500 m	Final	Rank
Simon Ehammer	Result	10.56	8.31 CB	14.24	2.08 PB	47.40 SB	13.75	34.92	5.20 PB	53.46	4:48.72 SB	8468 NR	2nd place, silver medalist(s)
Simon Ehammer	Points	961	1141	743	878	938	1007	562	972	640	626	8468 NR	2nd place, silver medalist(s)

=== Women ===
Track and road events

Athlete	Event	Heat		Semifinal		Final	
Athlete	Event	Result	Rank	Result	Rank	Result	Rank
Géraldine Frey	100 metres	11.45	8 Q	11.38	10	did not advance	
Nathacha Kouni	100 metres	Bye		11.54	20	did not advance	
Mujinga Kambundji	100 metres	Bye		11.05	2 Q	10.99	2nd place, silver medalist(s)
Mujinga Kambundji	200 metres	Bye		22.76	3 Q	22.32	1st place, gold medalist(s)
Léonie Pointet	200 metres	23.39	14 q	23.77	22	did not advance	
Silke Lemmens	400 metres	52.27	10 Q	53.08	22	did not advance	
Lore Hoffmann	800 metres	2:01.16	2 Q	2:01.12	7 q	1:59.92	4
Audrey Werro	800 metres	2:06.34	28	did not advance			
Fabienne Schlumpf	Marathon	—N/a				2:30:17 SB	9
Ditaji Kambundji	100 metres hurdles	Bye		12.78	5 Q	12.74	3rd place, bronze medalist(s)
Noemi Zbären	100 metres hurdles	13.34	10 q	13.15	14	did not advance	
Annina Fahr	400 metres hurdles	56.16 PB	3 Q	57.07	18	did not advance	
Yasmin Giger	400 metres hurdles	56.69	8 Q	57.13	20	did not advance	
Chiara Scherrer	3000 metres steeplechase	9:41.85	9 Q	—N/a		9:43.95	13
Géraldine Frey; Ajla Del Ponte; Salomé Kora; Melissa Gutschmidt	4 × 100 metres relay	43.93	9	—N/a		did not advance	
Silke Lemmens; Julia Niederberger; Annina Fahr; Sarah King	4 × 400 metres relay	3:26.83 SB	6 Q	—N/a		3:26.94	7

Field events

Athlete	Event	Qualification		Final	
Athlete	Event	Distance	Position	Distance	Position
Angelica Moser	Pole vault	4.50	=4 q	4.55	=4
Pascale Stöcklin	Pole vault	4.25	21	did not advance	

Combined events – Heptathlon

Athlete	Event	100H	HJ	SP	200 m	LJ	JT	800 m	Final	Rank
Annik Kälin	Result	13.23	1.74	13.56	24.14	6.73 PB	46.72	2:13.73 PB	6515 NR	3rd place, bronze medalist(s)
Annik Kälin	Points	1090	903	765	967	1082	797	911	6515 NR	3rd place, bronze medalist(s)

^{a} Athletes who participated in the heats only.
