= Croatia at the 2024 European Athletics Championships =

- Flag of Croatia
- WA code: CRO

in Rome, Italy 7 June 2024 – 12 June 2022
- Competitors: 17 (8 men and 9 women)
- Medals Ranked 15th: Gold 1 Silver 1 Bronze 0 Total 2

European Athletics Championships appearances
- 1994; 1998; 2002; 2006; 2010; 2012; 2014; 2016; 2018; 2022; 2024; 2026

Croatia competed at the 2024 European Athletics Championships in Rome, Italy from 7–12 June 2024 with 17 athletes, 8 male and 9 female, winning two medals: Sandra Perković won gold in discus throw and Filip Mihaljević silver in shot put.

== Medallists ==
Medal	Name	Event	Date
Gold	Sandra Elkasević	Women's discus throw	8 June
Silver	Filip Mihaljević	Men's shot put	8 June

== Results ==
Croatia entered the following athletes.

Key

- Q = Qualified for the next round
- q = Qualified for the next round as a fastest loser or, in field events, by position without achieving the qualifying target
- NR = National record
- PB = Personal best
- SB = Season best
- N/A = Round not applicable for the event

=== Men ===
Track and road events

Athlete	Event	Heat		Semifinal		Final	
Athlete	Event	Result	Rank	Result	Rank	Result	Rank
Roko Farkaš	200 metres	20.70 NR	6 q	20.95	22	Did not advance	
Marino Bloudek	800 metres	1:45.07 PB	4 q	1:47.16	14	Did not advance	

Field events

Athlete	Event	Qualification		Final	
Athlete	Event	Distance	Position	Distance	Position
Ivan Horvat	Pole vault	NM		Did not advance	
Marko Čeko	Long jump	7.79	20	Did not advance	
Filip Pravdica	Long jump	7.89	17	Did not advance	
Filip Mihaljević	Shot put	20.69	3 q	21.20	2nd place, silver medalist(s)
Martin Marković	Discus throw	61.46	15	Did not advance	
Matija Gregurić	Hammer throw	75.42 PB	8 q	75.47 PB	8

=== Women ===
Track and road events

Athlete	Event	Heat		Semifinal		Final	
Athlete	Event	Result	Rank	Result	Rank	Result	Rank
Nina Vuković	800 metres	2:02.74	21	Did not advance			
Bojana Bjeljac	10,000 metres	—N/a				33:48.63 SB	22
Matea Parlov Koštro	Half marathon	—N/a				1:11:48	25

Field events

Athlete	Event	Qualification		Final	
Athlete	Event	Distance	Position	Distance	Position
Lucija Leko	Shot put	15.61	22	Did not advance	
Sandra Elkasević	Discus throw	65.62	1 Q	67.04 SB	1st place, gold medalist(s)
Lucija Leko	Discus throw	56.97 PB	18	Did not advance	
Marija Tolj	Discus throw	60.67	11 q	61.42	8
Lucija Cvitanović	Javelin throw	52.66	25	Did not advance	
Sara Kolak	Javelin throw	57.73	10 q	55.90	11

Combined events – Heptathlon

Athlete	Event	100H	HJ	SP	200 m	LJ	JT	800 m	Final	Rank
Jana Koščak	Result	13.40 SB	1.80	12.16	25.12	6.21	42.66 SB	2:25.31	5977 WU20L	14
Jana Koščak	Points	1065	978	672	876	915	718	753	5977 WU20L	14
