= Ukraine at the 2022 European Athletics Championships =

- Flag of Ukraine
- WA code: UKR
- National federation: Ukrainian Athletic Federation

in Munich, Germany 15 August 2022 – 21 August 2022
- Competitors: 48 (24 men and 24 women) in 26 events
- Medals Ranked 9th: Gold 2 Silver 1 Bronze 2 Total 5

European Athletics Championships appearances
- 1994; 1998; 2002; 2006; 2010; 2012; 2014; 2016; 2018; 2022; 2024; 2026

Other related appearances
- Soviet Union (1946–1990)

Ukraine competed at the 2022 European Athletics Championships in Munich, Germany, between 15 and 21 August 2022

== Medallists ==
Medal	Name	Event	Date
Gold	Maryna Bekh-Romanchuk	Women's triple jump	19 August
Gold	Yaroslava Mahuchikh	Women's high jump	21 August
Silver	Viktoriya Tkachuk	Women's 400 metres hurdles	19 August
Bronze	Andriy Protsenko	Men's high jump	18 August
Bronze	Anna Ryzhykova	Women's 400 metres hurdles	19 August

== Results ==
Ukraine entered the following athletes.

Key

- Q = Qualified for the next round
- q = Qualified for the next round as a fastest loser or, in field events, by position without achieving the qualifying target
- NR = National record
- PB = Personal best
- SB = Season best
- N/A = Round not applicable for the event

=== Men ===
Track and road events

Athlete	Event	Heat		Semifinal		Final	
Athlete	Event	Result	Rank	Result	Rank	Result	Rank
Danylo Danylenko	400 m	46.39 SB	23	Did not advance			
Vitaliy Shafar	Marathon	—N/a				2:22:24	53
Ihor Heletiy	Marathon	—N/a				2:26:33 SB	59
Viktor Shumik	20 km walk	—N/a				1:25:51 SB	15
Ivan Losev	20 km walk	—N/a				1:27:10 SB	18
Serhiy Svitlychniy	20 km walk	—N/a				1:28:51 SB	22
Maryan Zakalnytskyy	35 km walk	—N/a				2:39:06 SB	11
Ivan Banzeruk	35 km walk	—N/a				2:39:34 SB	13
Anton Radko	35 km walk	—N/a				2:43:10 SB	15
Serhiy Smelyk; Stanislav Kovalenko; Kyrylo Prykhodko; Andrii Vasyliev	4 × 100 m relay	39.62 SB	14	—N/a		Did not advance	
Oleksiy Pozdnyakov; Danylo Danylenko; Mykyta Barabanov; Oleksandr Pohorilko	4 × 400 m relay	3:04.15 SB	12	—N/a		Did not advance	

Field events

Athlete	Event	Qualification		Final	
Athlete	Event	Distance	Position	Distance	Position
Andriy Protsenko	High jump	2.21	8 q	2.27	3rd place, bronze medalist(s)
Oleh Doroshchuk	High jump	2.21	10 q	2.23	4
Bohdan Bondarenko	High jump	2.17	14	Did not advance	
Roman Kokoshko	Shot put	19.86	13	Did not advance	
Mykyta Nesterenko	Dscus throw	57.59	23	Did not advance	
Mykhaylo Kokhan	Hammer throw	77.85	3 Q	78.48	5
Mykhailo Havryliuk	Hammer throw	71.14	17	Did not advance	
Artur Felfner	Javelin throw	76.06	15	Did not advance	

=== Women ===
Track and road events

Athlete	Event	Heat		Semifinal		Final	
Athlete	Event	Result	Rank	Result	Rank	Result	Rank
Nataliya Krol	800 m	2:00.89 SB	1 Q	2:01.84	13	Did not advance	
Olha Lyakhova	800 m	2:02.91	13	Did not advance			
Valeriia Zinenko	10,000 m	—N/a				31:55.60 PB	7
Tetyana Hamera	Marathon	—N/a				2:37:28 SB	27
Marina Nemchenko	Marathon	—N/a				2:53:13 SB	51
Yevheniya Prokofyeva	Marathon	—N/a				DNF	
Viktoriia Kaliuzhna	Marathon	—N/a				DNF	
Hanna Plotitsyna	100 m hurdles	13.66	20	Did not advance			
Anna Ryzhykova	400 m hurdles	Bye		54.25 SB	2 Q	54.86	3rd place, bronze medalist(s)
Viktoriya Tkachuk	400 m hurdles	Bye		54.65	4 Q	54.30	2nd place, silver medalist(s)
Nataliya Strebkova	3000 m steeplechase	9:47.35	14 q	—N/a		9:37.52	9
Lyudmyla Olyanovska	20 km walk	—N/a				1:29:46 SB	4
Olena Sobchuk	20 km walk	—N/a				1:32:07	9
Hanna Shevchuk	20 km walk	—N/a				DQ	
Inna Loseva	35 km walk	—N/a				2:57:55 SB	8
Tamara Havrylyuk	35 km walk	—N/a				3:21:01 SB	18

Field events

Athlete	Event	Qualification		Final	
Athlete	Event	Distance	Position	Distance	Position
Iryna Herashchenko	High jump	1.87	5 q	1.93	5
Yaroslava Mahuchikh	High jump	1.87	9 q	1.95	1st place, gold medalist(s)
Yuliya Levchenko	High jump	1.87	13 q	1.86	9
Yana Hladiychuk	Pole vault	4.25	18	Did not advance	
Maryna Kylypko	Pole vault	4.25	22	Did not advance	
Maryna Bekh-Romanchuk	Long jump	6.87 SB	2 Q	6.76	4
Maryna Bekh-Romanchuk	Triple jump	14.36	3 q	15.02 EL	1st place, gold medalist(s)
Iryna Klymets	Hammer throw	67.87	10 q	69.18	6
Hanna Hatsko	Javelin throw	57.39	13	Did not advance	

Combined events – Heptathlon

Athlete	Event	100H	HJ	SP	200 m	LJ	JT	800 m	Final	Rank
Yuliya Loban	Result	14.36	1.74	13.99	25.68	6.00 PB	44.77	2:22.62	5846 SB	12
Yuliya Loban	Points	928	903	793	825	850	759	788	5846 SB	12
