= Czech Republic at the 2022 European Athletics Championships =

- Flag of the Czech Republic
- WA code: CZE
- National federation: Czech Athletics Federation

in Munich, Germany 15 August 2022 – 21 August 2022
- Competitors: 51 (28 men and 23 women) in 34 events
- Medals Ranked 24th: Gold 0 Silver 1 Bronze 2 Total 3

European Athletics Championships appearances
- 1994; 1998; 2002; 2006; 2010; 2012; 2014; 2016; 2018; 2022; 2024; 2026

Other related appearances
- Czechoslovakia (1934–1990)

Czech Republic competed at the 2022 European Athletics Championships in Munich, Germany, between 15 and 21 August 2022

== Medallists ==
Medal	Name	Event	Date
Silver	Jakub Vadlejch	Men's javelin throw	21 August
Bronze	Tomáš Staněk	Men's shot put	15 August
Bronze	Barbora Špotáková	Women's javelin throw	20 August

== Results ==
Czech Republic entered the following athletes.

Key

- Q = Qualified for the next round
- q = Qualified for the next round as a fastest loser or, in field events, by position without achieving the qualifying target
- NR = National record
- PB = Personal best
- SB = Season best
- N/A = Round not applicable for the event

Men
Track and road

Athletes	Event	Heats		Semifinal		Final	
Athletes	Event	Result	Rank	Result	Rank	Result	Rank
Jan Friš	1500 m	3:40.99	19	—N/a		did not advance	
Lukáš Gdula	35 km walk	—N/a				DSQ	
Vít Hlaváč	35 km walk	—N/a				2:37:32	9
Jiří Homoláč	Marathon	—N/a				DNF	
Jan Jirka	200 m	20.84	12 Q	20.80	17	did not advance	
Matěj Krsek	400 m	46.12	16 Q	45.92	16	did not advance	
Eduard Kubelík	200 m	21.25	22	did not advance			
Pavel Maslák	400 m	45.92 SB	13 q	46.36	20	did not advance	
Vít Müller	400 m hurdles	49.86	7 q	49.78	17	did not advance	
Jiří Polák	200 m	20.94	18	did not advance			
Filip Sasínek	1500 m	DNF		—N/a		did not advance	
Filip Šnejdr	800 m	1:48.16	25	did not advance			
Patrik Šorm	400 m	45.66 SB	7 Q	45.66	9	did not advance	
Zdeněk Stromšík	100 m	10.60	16	did not advance			
Martin Tuček	400 m hurdles	50.09	10 q	50.32	21	did not advance	
Damián Vích	3000 m steeplechase	8:41.43	21	—N/a		did not advance	
Zdeněk Stromšík; Jiří Polák; Jan Jirka; David Kolář	4 × 100 m relay	39.41	14	—N/a		did not advance	
Matěj Krsek; Pavel Maslák; Michal Desenský; Patrik Šorm	4 × 400 m relay	3:02.07	5 Q	—N/a		3:01.82	6

Field events

Athletes	Event	Qualification		Final	
Athletes	Event	Distance	Position	Distance	Position
Josef Adámek	High jump	2.12	21	did not advance	
Marek Bárta	Discus throw	58.37	22	did not advance	
Radek Juška	Long jump	7.80	7 q	7.66	9
Martin Konečný	Javelin throw	77.49	9 q	73.48	12
Tomáš Staněk	Shot put	21.39	2 Q	21.26	3rd place, bronze medalist(s)
Jan Štefela	High jump	2.21	10 q	2.18	7
Jakub Vadlejch	Javelin throw	81.81	1 q	87.28	2nd place, silver medalist(s)
Vítězslav Veselý	Javelin throw	79.27	4 q	84.36	4

Combined events – Decathlon

Athlete	Event	100 m	LJ	SP	HJ	400 m	110H	DT	PV	JT	1500 m	Final	Rank
Adam Helcelet	Result	11.13 SB	7.28 SB	15.30	1.99	50.16 SB	14.36 SB	43.44	4.60 SB	63.44 SB	4:47.48 SB	8000 SB	11
Adam Helcelet	Points	832	881	808	794	807	929	735	790	790	634	8000 SB	11
Jiří Sýkora	Result	11.09 SB	6.92	NM	DNS							DNF	
Jiří Sýkora	Points	841	795	0	DNS							DNF	

Women
Track and road

Athletes	Event	Heats		Semifinal		Final	
Athletes	Event	Result	Rank	Result	Rank	Result	Rank
Tereza Ďurdiaková	35 km walk	—N/a				3:01:19	12
Martina Hofmanová	200 m	23.73	23	did not advance			
Tereza Hrochová	Marathon	—N/a				2:36.00	23
Nikoleta Jíchová	400 m hurdles	55.93	2 Q	55.48 PB	11	did not advance	
Helena Jiranová	100 m hurdles	13.50	17	did not advance			
Marcela Joglová	Marathon	—N/a				2:36:26 SB	24
Eva Kubíčková	100 m	11.61	18	did not advance			
Kristiina Mäki	1500 metres	4:04.40	7 q	—N/a		4:05.73	6
Eliška Martínková	20 km walk	—N/a				1:31:44	7
Diana Mezuliáníková	1500 m	4:07.37	15	—N/a		did not advance	
Tereza Petržilková	400 m	52.35	11 q	52.38	18	did not advance	
Moira Stewartová	Marathon	—N/a				2:43:03 SB	43
Lada Vondrová	400 m	—N/a		51.83	14	did not advance	
Eva Kubíčková; Tereza Lamačová; Natálie Kožuškaničová; Johana Kaiserová	4 × 100 metres relay	DNF		—N/a		did not advance	
Tereza Petržilková; Nikoleta Jíchová; Martina Hofmanová; Lada Vondrová	4 × 100 metres relay	DQ		—N/a		did not advance	
Tereza Hrochová; Marcela Joglová; Moira Stewartová	Marathon team	—N/a				7:55:29	7

Field events

Athletes	Event	Qualification		Final	
Athletes	Event	Distance	Position	Distance	Position
Markéta Červenková	Shot put	NM		did not advance	
Nikola Ogrodníková	Javelin throw	57.82	8 q	54.48	12
Barbora Špotáková	Javelin throw	60.75	3 q	60.68	3rd place, bronze medalist(s)
Amálie Švábíková	Pole vault	4.40	14	did not advance	
Nikol Tabačková	Javelin throw	57.54	11 q	57.93	8

Combined events – Heptathlon

Athlete	Event	100H	HJ	SP	200 m	LJ	JT	800 m	Final	Rank
Dorota Skřivanová	Result	13.92	1.77	13.24	24.45	NM	DNS		DNF	
Dorota Skřivanová	Points	990	941	743	938	0	DNS		DNF	
