= 2022 European Athletics Championships – Women's 800 metres =

Women's 800 metres at the 2022 European Athletics Championships
- Venue: Olympiastadion
- Location: Munich, Germany
- Dates: 18 August 2022 (round 1); 19 August 2022 (semi-finals); 20 August 2022 (final)
- Competitors: 31 from 17 nations
- Winning time: 1:59.04 min

Medalists
gold medal	Keely Hodgkinson	Great Britain
silver medal	Rénelle Lamote	France
bronze medal	Anna Wielgosz	Poland

The women's 800 metres at the 2022 European Athletics Championships was held over three rounds at the Olympiastadion in Munich, Germany, from 18 to 20 August 2022. It was the twenty-first time that the event was contested at the European Athletics Championships. Athletes could qualify by running the entry standard of 2:00.40 min, by wild card for the defending champion, or by their World Athletics Rankings position.

Thirty-one athletes from seventeen nations competed in round 1, where sixteen athletes advanced to the semi-finals. Subsequently, eight athletes advanced to the final, which was won by Keely Hodgkinson of Great Britain and Northern Ireland in 1:59.04 min, followed by Rénelle Lamote of France in 1:59.49 min in second place and Anna Wielgosz of Poland in 1:59.87 min in third place.

== Background ==
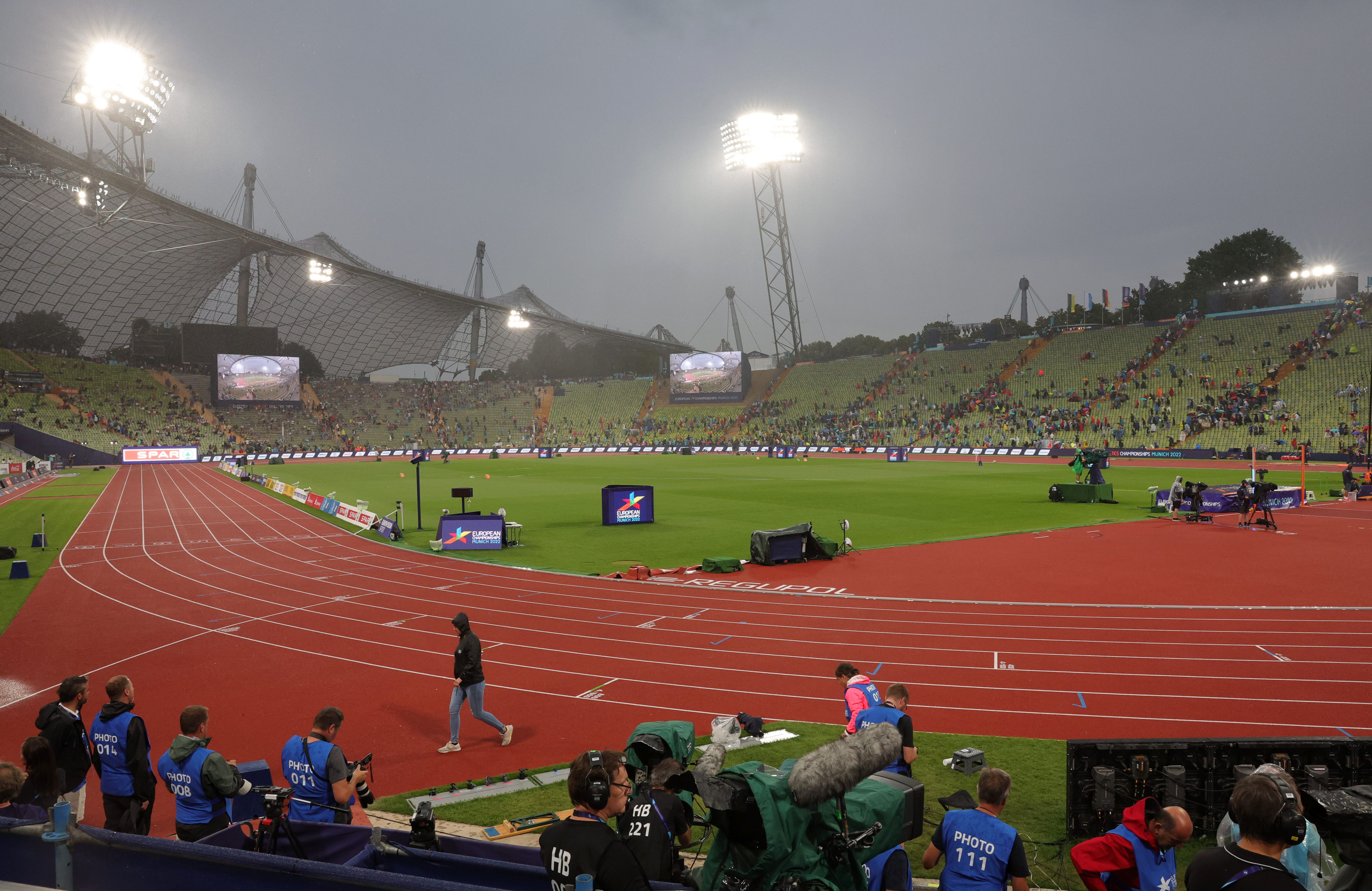
Olympiastadion in August 2022

In the 800 metres, athletes run two laps on a standard 400-metre track, starting in separate lanes before breaking for the inside lanes after the first bend. The women's 800 metres was introduced at the European Athletics Championships in 1954 and had been contested twenty times before 2022. The track and field events of the 2022 European Athletics Championships were held at the Olympiastadion (English: Olympic Stadium) in Munich, Germany.

Before the 2022 championships, the world and European record was 1:53.28 min set by Jarmila Kratochvílová of Czechoslovakia in 1983 and the championship record was 1:55.41 min set by Olga Mineyeva of the Soviet Union at the 1982 championships. The world leading performance of 1:56.30 min was run by Athing Mu of the United States and the European leading performance of 1:56.38 min was run by Keely Hodgkinson of Great Britain and Northern Ireland, when they won the gold and silver medal at the 2022 World Athletics Championships on 24 July 2022. Nataliya Krol of Ukraine was the defending champion after winning the 2018 European Athletics Championships final in 2:00.38 min.

Records before the 2022 European Athletics Championships
Record	Athlete (nation)	Time	Location	Date
World record	Jarmila Kratochvílová (TCH)	1:53.28	Munich, Germany	26 July 1983
European record	Jarmila Kratochvílová (TCH)	1:53.28	Munich, Germany	26 July 1983
Championship record	Olga Mineyeva (URS)	1:55.41	Athens, Greece	8 September 1982
World leading	Athing Mu (USA)	1:56.30	Eugene, United States	24 July 2022
Europe leading	Keely Hodgkinson (GBR)	1:56.38	Eugene, United States	24 July 2022

== Qualification ==
For the women's 800 metres, athletes could qualify by running the entry standard of 2:00.40 min or faster during the qualification period from 7 July 2021 to 26 July 2022, by wild card for a defending champion, or by their position on the World Athletics Rankings for the event on 26 July 2022. The target was to qualify thirty-two athletes. A final entry list with thirty-five athletes from eighteen nations was published on 8 August 2022.

== Results ==
=== Round 1 ===
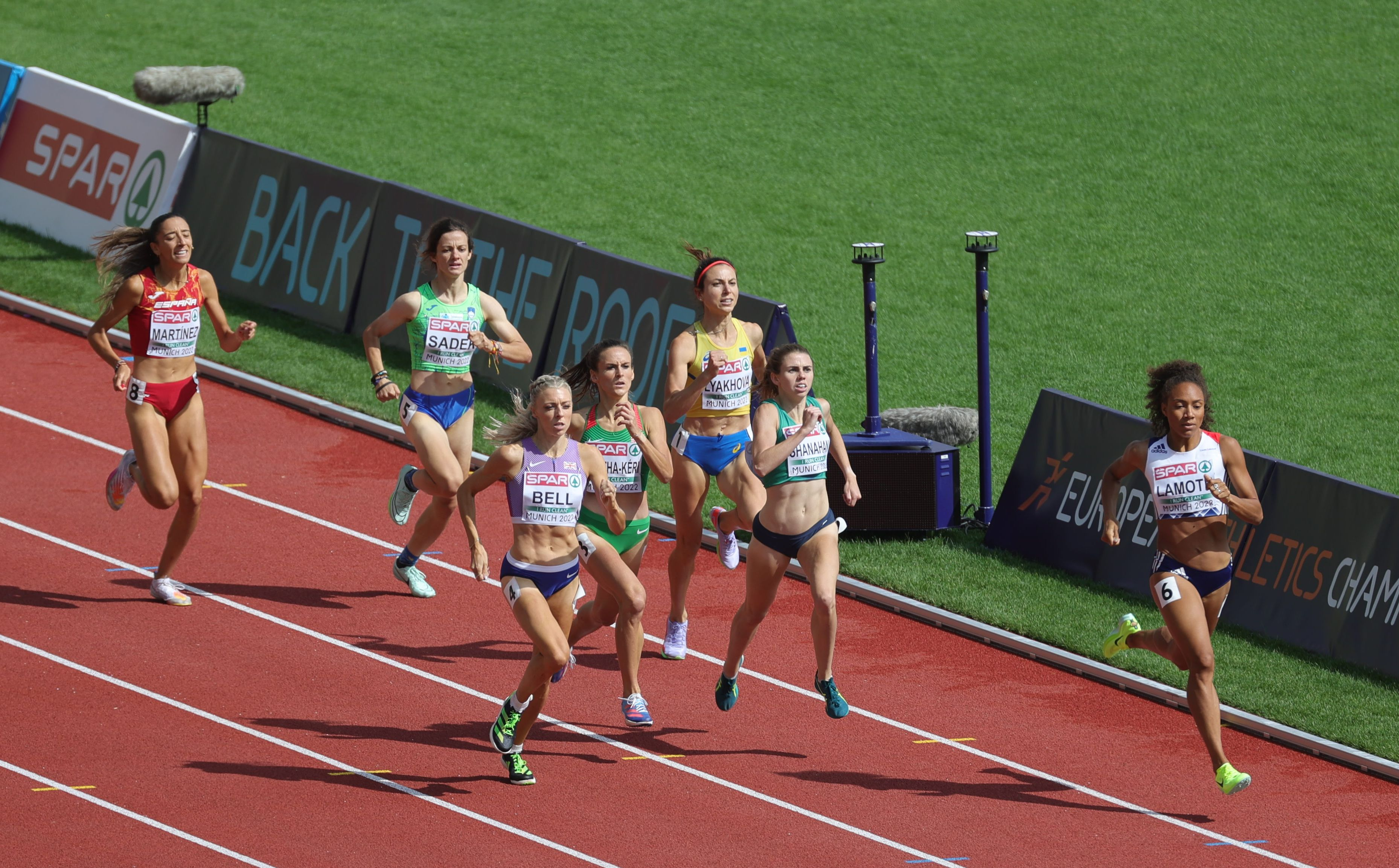
Third heat of round 1, where Rénelle Lamote of France (right) was the fastest runner

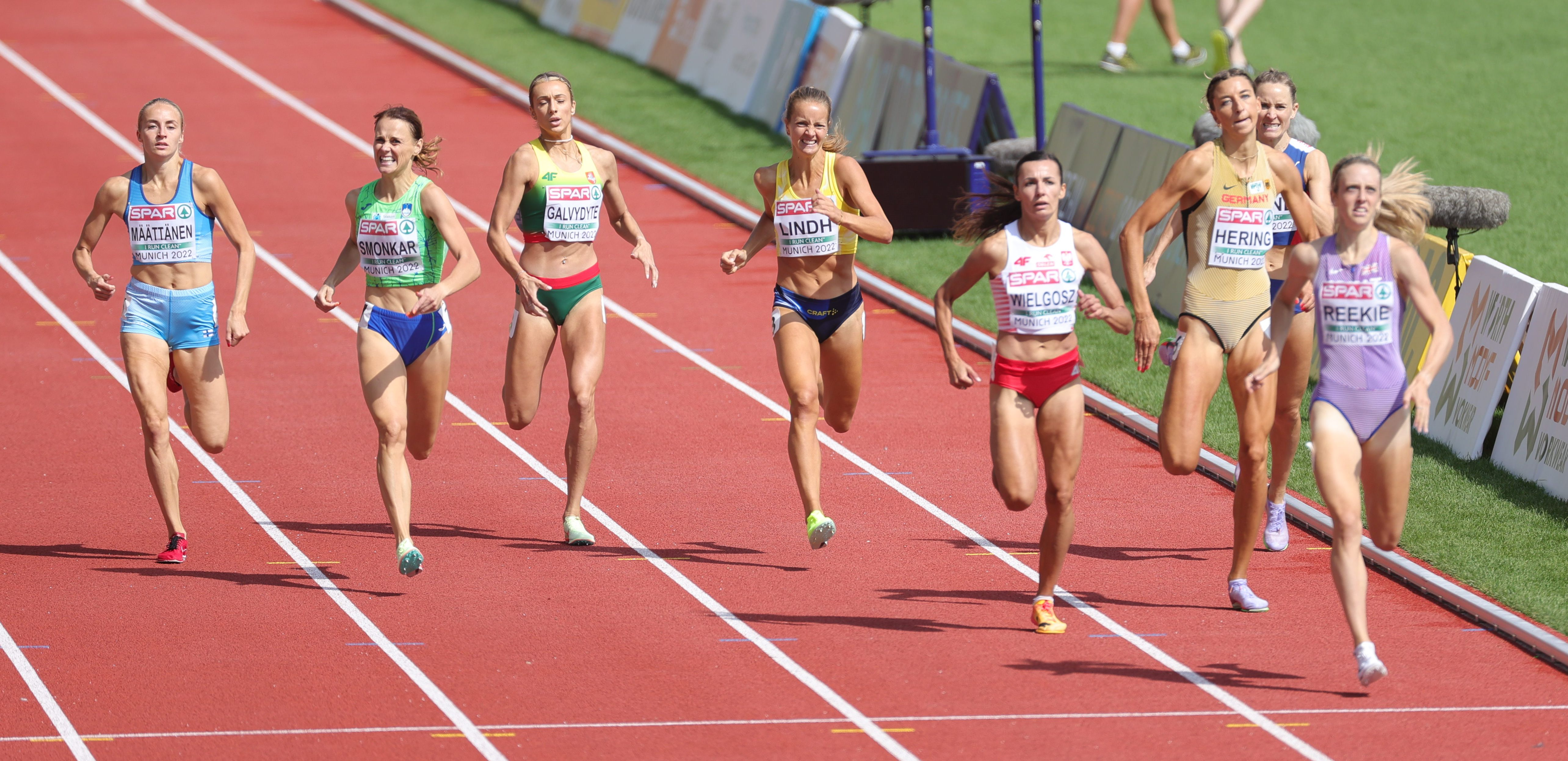
Fourth heat of round 1, where Jemma Reekie of Great Britain and Northern Ireland (right) was the fastest runner

On 18 August 2022, thirty-one athletes from seventeen nations competed in the four heats of round 1, starting at 10:45 (UTC+2). Sixteen athletes, the first three athletes in each heat (Q) and the next four fastest athletes overall (q), qualified for the semi-finals. In the first heat, Lucia Pinacchio of Spain ran a personal best (PB) of 2:01.63 min. Being the fastest race, the four non-automatic qualifiers all came from this first heat. In the third heat, Vanessa Scaunet of Belgium did not finish (DNF).

Results of round 1
Rank	Heat	Lane	Athlete	Nation	Time	Note
1	1	7	Nataliia Krol	Ukraine	2:00.89	Q, SB
2	1	3	Lore Hoffmann	Switzerland	2:01.16	Q
3	1	2	Ekaterina Guliyev	Turkey	2:01.59	Q
4	1	5	Lucia Pinacchio	Spain	2:01.63	q, PB
5	1	4	Elena Bellò	Italy	2:01.80	q
6	1	6	Adrianna Czapla	Poland	2:01.89	q
7	3	6	Rénelle Lamote	France	2:02.22	Q
8	4	1	Jemma Reekie	Great Britain & N.I.	2:02.36	Q
9	3	4	Alexandra Bell	Great Britain & N.I.	2:02.43	Q
10	1	8	Majtie Kolberg	Germany	2:02.52	q
11	4	2	Anna Wielgosz	Poland	2:02.77	Q
12	3	7	Louise Shanahan	Ireland	2:02.80	Q
13	3	1	Olha Lyakhova	Ukraine	2:02.91	
14	3	3	Bianka Bartha-Kéri	Hungary	2:02.99	
15	4	6	Christina Hering	Germany	2:03.00	Q
16	4	7	Jerneja Smonkar	Slovenia	2:03.24	
17	3	8	Marina Martínez	Spain	2:03.45	
18	4	8	Lovisa Lindh	Sweden	2:03.48	
19	4	4	Hedda Hynne	Norway	2:03.64	
20	4	5	Eveliina Määttänen	Finland	2:03.66	
21	2	8	Keely Hodgkinson	Great Britain & N.I.	2:03.72	Q
22	4	3	Gabija Galvydytė	Lithuania	2:03.92	
23	2	2	Angelika Sarna	Poland	2:04.12	Q
24	2	4	Sara Kuivisto	Finland	2:04.32	Q
25	2	3	Eloisa Coiro	Italy	2:04.36	
26	3	5	Veronika Sadek	Slovenia	2:04.57	
27	2	7	Tanja Spill	Germany	2:04.60	
28	2	5	Audrey Werro	Switzerland	2:06.34	
29	2	6	Agnès Raharolahy	France	2:07.02	
30	1	1	Anita Horvath	Switzerland	2:23.76	
	3	2	Vanessa Scaunet	Belgium	DNF	

=== Semi-finals ===
On 19 August 2022, sixteen athletes from eleven nations competed in the two heats of the semi-finals, starting at 10:50 (UTC+2). Eight athletes, the first three athletes in each heat (Q) and the next two fastest athletes overall (q), qualified for the final. The two non-automatic qualifiers came from the second heat. Defending champion Nataliia Krol of Ukraine did not qualify for the final.

Results of the semi-finals
Rank	Heat	Lane	Athlete	Nation	Time	Note
1	2	4	Rénelle Lamote	France	2:00.23	Q
2	2	6	Jemma Reekie	Great Britain & N.I.	2:00.30	Q
3	2	5	Alexandra Bell	Great Britain & N.I.	2:00.53	Q
4	1	5	Keely Hodgkinson	Great Britain & N.I.	2:00.67	Q
5	2	3	Christina Hering	Germany	2:00.86	q
6	1	6	Anna Wielgosz	Poland	2:01.05	Q
7	2	7	Lore Hoffmann	Switzerland	2:01.12	q
8	1	4	Louise Shanahan	Ireland	2:01.15	Q
9	1	1	Majtie Kolberg	Germany	2:01.20	SB
10	1	2	Ekaterina Guliyev	Turkey	2:01.32	
11	2	2	Sara Kuivisto	Finland	2:01.59	SB
12	1	3	Elena Bellò	Italy	2:01.67	
13	1	7	Nataliia Krol	Ukraine	2:01.84	
14	2	8	Angelika Sarna	Poland	2:02.15	
15	1	8	Adrianna Czapla	Poland	2:04.15	
16	2	1	Lucia Pinacchio	Spain	2:06.82	

=== Final ===
On 20 August 2022, eight athletes from six nations competed in the final at 20:15 (UTC+2). Christina Hering of Germany was in the lead after the first lap in 58.60 s, followed by Rénelle Lamote of France and Jemma Reekie and Keely Hodgkinson both representing Great Britain and Northern Ireland. In the last bend, Reekie and Hodgkinson had taken over the lead. Reekie didn't hold on to a medalling position, but Hodgkinson won the race in 1:59.04 min, followed by Lamote in 1:59.49 min in second place and Anna Wielgosz of Poland in 1:59.87 min in third place. Euan Crumley of Athletics Weekly called it a "convincing victory" for Hodgkinson. Sean Ingle of The Guardian called it a "classy run" and saw "a familiar display of class and authority" from Hodgkinson.

In an interview, Hodgkinson said about the final race: "I wanted to do something a little bit different. I think it might have been a bit obvious if I'd gone to the front like I have been doing all year. The last 120m I went for it and hopefully it was enough." Lamotte said: (translated from French) "I thought I could win today, but I lacked confidence in myself. It doesn't matter, I ensure this silver medal which is very important to me. It's a party!" Wielgosz said: (translated from Polish) "I was considering ending my career. It is impossible for someone to support themselves with their own savings. I'm shocked that I managed to get through this mentally. Now I'm just happy."

Results of the final
Rank	Lane	Athlete	Nation	Time	Note
1st place, gold medalist(s)	5	Keely Hodgkinson	Great Britain & N.I.	1:59.04	
2nd place, silver medalist(s)	6	Rénelle Lamote	France	1:59.49	
3rd place, bronze medalist(s)	1	Anna Wielgosz	Poland	1:59.87	
4	2	Lore Hoffmann	Switzerland	1:59.92	
5	3	Jemma Reekie	Great Britain & N.I.	2:00.31	
6	7	Alexandra Bell	Great Britain & N.I.	2:00.68	
7	8	Christina Hering	Germany	2:00.82	
8	4	Louise Shanahan	Ireland	2:01.64	
