= Athlete Refugee Team at the 2022 European Athletics Championships =

- WA code: ART
- National federation: European Athletic Association

in Munich
- Competitors: 2 (2 men) in 2 events
- Medals: Gold 0 Silver 0 Bronze 0 Total 0

European Athletics Championships appearances
- 2022; 2024

Two athletes competed as part of the Athlete Refugee Team at the 2022 European Athletics Championships in Munich, Germany, from 15–21 August 2022.

== Athletes ==
Athlete	Country of origin	Host NOC	Sport	Event
Jamal Abdelmaji Eisa Mohammed	Sudan	Israel	Athletics	Men's 10,000 metres
Tachlowini Gabriyesos	Eritrea	Israel	Athletics	Men's marathon

== Results ==
Athlete Refugee Team entered the following athletes.

Athletes	Event	Heats		Semifinal		Final	
Athletes	Event	Result	Rank	Result	Rank	Result	Rank
Jamal Abdelmaji Eisa Mohammed	Men's 10,000 metres	—N/a				DNF	
Tachlowini Gabriyesos	Men's marathon	—N/a				DNF	
