= 2022 European Athletics Championships – Women's 400 metres =

Women's 400 metres at the 2022 European Athletics Championships
- Venue: Olympiastadion
- Location: Munich, Germany
- Dates: 15 August 2022 (round 1); 16 August 2022 (semi-finals); 17 August 2022 (final)
- Competitors: 35 from 18 nations
- Winning time: 49.44 s NR

Medalists
gold medal	Femke Bol	Netherlands
silver medal	Natalia Kaczmarek	Poland
bronze medal	Anna Kiełbasińska	Poland

The women's 400 metres at the 2022 European Athletics Championships was held over three rounds at the Olympiastadion in Munich, Germany, from 15 to 17 August 2022. It was the twentieth time this event was contested at the European Athletics Championships. Athletes could qualify by achieving the entry standard of 51.70 seconds, by receiving a wild card, or by virtue of their ranking.

Twenty-three athletes competed in round 1 on 15 August. Janet Richard set a Maltese record of 53.49 s. The three fastest athletes of each heat plus the next three fastest of the rest qualified for the semi-finals, where they were joined by the twelve highest-ranking athletes, who had a bye in round 1. Twenty-four athletes competed in the semi-finals on 16 August. The two fastest in each heat and the two fastest of the rest advanced to the final.

Eight athletes competed in the final on 17 August. Femke Bol of the Netherlands won the final race in a national record of 49.44 s. Natalia Kaczmarek of Poland finished in second place in 49.94 s and Anna Kiełbasińska of Poland placed third in 50.29 s. Outside the medals, Rhasidat Adeleke or Ireland set a national record of 50.53 seconds.

== Background ==
The women's 400 metres was contested nineteen times a before 2022, after having been introduced at the 1958 edition. The previous edition of 2018, had been won by Justyna Święty-Ersetic of Poland, who returned as defending champion. The 2022 edition was held at the 400-metre track of the Olympiastadion in Munich, Germany.

At the start of the Championships, Marita Koch of East Germany held the world and European record of 47.60 s set in 1985 and the championship record of 48.16 s set in 1982. Shaunae Miller-Uibo of the Bahamas had set the world leading mark of 49.12 s on 25 July 2022, and Femke Bol of the Netherlands had set the European leading mark of 49.75 s on 6 August 2022.

Records before the 2022 European Athletics Championships
Record	Athlete (nation)	Time	Location	Date
World record	Marita Koch (GDR)	47.60	Canberra, Australia	6 October 1985
European record	Marita Koch (GDR)	47.60	Canberra, Australia	6 October 1985
Championship record	Marita Koch (GDR)	48.16	Athens, Greece	8 September 1982
World leading	Shaunae Miller-Uibo (BAH)	49.11	Eugene, Oregon, United States	25 July 2022
Europe leading	Femke Bol (NED)	49.75	Chorzów, Poland	6 August 2022

== Qualification ==
For this event, the qualification period was from 27 July 2021 to 26 July 2022. Athletes could qualify by achieving the entry standard of 51.70 s, by wild card as defending European 400-metres champion, or by virtue of their position on the World Athletics Rankings for the event. There was a target number of thirty-six athletes for this event. A final entry list with thirty-nine athletes was compiled on 8 August 2022.

== Rounds ==
=== Round 1 ===
Twenty-three athletes from seventeen nations competed in the three heats of the first round on 15 August, that started at 19:35 (UTC+2) in the evening. The first three athletes in each heat (Q) and the next three fastest of the rest (q) advanced to the semi-finals. The twelve highest-ranked athletes received a bye into the semi-finals. In the second heat, Janet Richard improved the Maltese record (NR) to 53.49 s, although she didn't advance to the next round.

Results of round 1
Rank	Heat	Lane	Name	Nation	Time	Note
1	2	5	Iga Baumgart-Witan	Poland	51.09	Q, SB
2	2	4	Amandine Brossier	France	51.26	Q, SB
3	1	7	Laviai Nielsen	Great Britain & N.I.	51.60	Q, SB
4	3	3	Cátia Azevedo	Portugal	51.63	Q
5	2	3	Susanne Walli	Austria	51.73	Q, SB
6	1	5	Eveline Saalberg	Netherlands	51.81	Q
7	2	8	Camille Laus	Belgium	51.91	q
8	2	7	Alice Mangione	Italy	51.92	q
9	3	4	Gunta Vaičule	Latvia	52.26	Q
10	1	4	Silke Lemmens	Switzerland	52.27	Q
11	2	2	Tereza Petržilková	Czech Republic	52.35	q
12	3	5	Alica Schmidt	Germany	52.52	Q
13	3	8	Anna Polinari	Italy	52.60	
14	3	2	Sokhna Lacoste	France	52.62	
15	3	6	Sharlene Mawdsley	Ireland	52.63	
16	3	1	Naomi Van den Broeck	Belgium	52.80	
17	1	6	Virginia Troiani	Italy	52.83	
18	1	2	Mette Baas	Finland	53.02	
19	1	3	Phil Healy	Ireland	53.10	
20	1	8	Linn Oppegaard	Norway	53.29	
21	2	6	Janet Richard	Malta	53.49	NR
22	2	1	Milja Thureson	Finland	53.63	
23	3	7	Norcady Reyes	Gibraltar	59.59	

=== Semi-finals ===
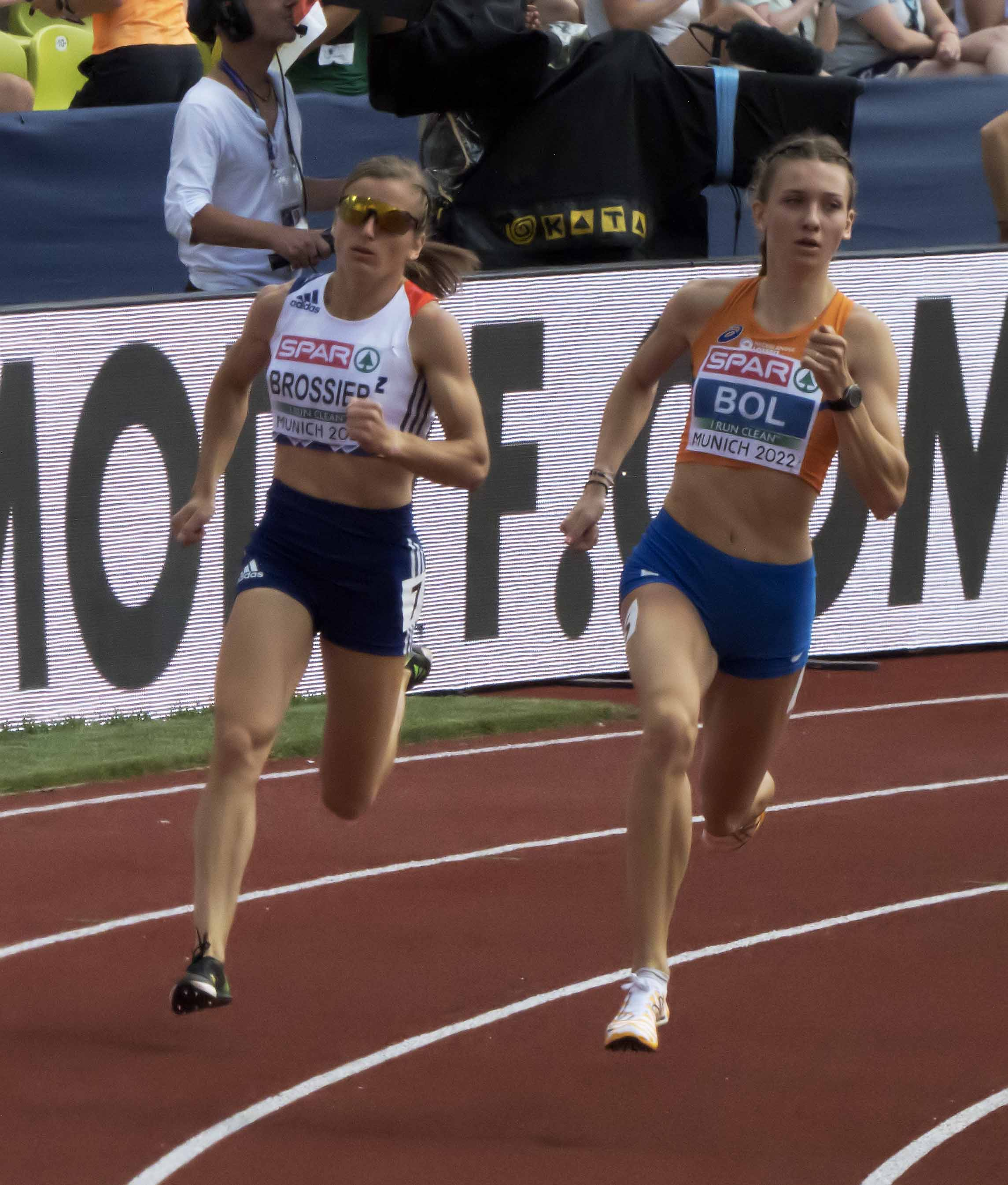
Amandine Brossier and Femke Bol during their semi-final heat

Twenty-four athletes from fourteen nations competed in the three heats of the semi-finals on 16 August, that started at 13:00 (UTC+2) in the afternoon. The first two athletes in each heat (Q) and the next two fastest athletes of the rest (q) advanced to the final. Victoria Ohuruogu, Amandine Brossier, and Gunta Vaičule set personal bests (PB) in this round – of these three, only Ohuruogu advanced to the next round.

Results of the semi-finals
Rank	Heat	Lane	Name	Nation	Time	Note
1	2	6	Natalia Kaczmarek	Poland	50.40	Q
2	1	3	Anna Kiełbasińska	Poland	50.45	Q
3	2	5	Victoria Ohuruogu	Great Britain & N.I.	50.50	Q, PB
4	1	6	Lieke Klaver	Netherlands	50.59	Q
5	3	6	Femke Bol	Netherlands	50.60	Q
6	3	8	Cynthia Bolingo	Belgium	50.83	Q
7	3	4	Rhasidat Adeleke	Ireland	51.08	q
8	1	5	Iga Baumgart-Witan	Poland	51.17	q
9	3	7	Amandine Brossier	France	51.21	PB
10	1	1	Gunta Vaičule	Latvia	51.25	PB
11	1	8	Cátia Azevedo	Portugal	51.42	
12	1	7	Laviai Nielsen	Great Britain & N.I.	51.53	SB
13	2	4	Modesta Justė Morauskaitė	Lithuania	51.70	
14	2	3	Lada Vondrová	Czech Republic	51.83	
15	2	7	Alice Mangione	Italy	52.02	
16	3	5	Nicole Yeargin	Great Britain & N.I.	52.09	
17	3	3	Justyna Święty-Ersetic	Poland	52.17	
18	1	2	Tereza Petržilková	Czech Republic	52.38	
19	2	8	Eveline Saalberg	Netherlands	52.45	
20	3	1	Susanne Walli	Austria	52.58	
21	1	4	Corinna Schwab	Germany	52.70	
22	2	2	Silke Lemmens	Switzerland	53.08	
23	3	2	Alica Schmidt	Germany	53.12	
24	2	1	Camille Laus	Belgium	54.28	

=== Final ===
Eight athletes from five nations competed in the final on 17 August, that started at 22:02 (UTC+2) in the evening. About 200 metres in, Lieke Klaver of the Netherlands was in the lead, followed by Natalia Kaczmarek of Poland and Femke Bol of the Netherlands. After 300 metres, Klaver was overtaken by Kaczmarek and Bol. The race was won by Bol in a European leading time and a new Dutch record (NR) of 49.44 s. Kaczmarek finished second, 0.5 seconds after Bol, in 49.94 s, and she was followed by Anna Kiełbasińska of Poland who finished in third place with a time of 50.29 s. In fifth place, Rhasidat Adeleke of Ireland set a national record (NR) of 50.53 s.

In an interview, Bol said: "It wasn’t until after the race that I realised it wasn't such a close race. I won by half-a-second and with a big personal best. I felt confident and strong." Although she had won international medals before, this was Bol's first international title. Two days later, Bol also won the women's 400 metres hurdles in an unprecedented double at the European Athletics Championships. Afterwards, Bol said: "I am so proud to achieve the double, but I will never do it again. Well, maybe. Never say never."

Results of the final
Rank	Lane	Name	Nation	Time	Note
1st place, gold medalist(s)	5	Femke Bol	Netherlands	49.44	EL, NR
2nd place, silver medalist(s)	6	Natalia Kaczmarek	Poland	49.94	
3rd place, bronze medalist(s)	4	Anna Kiełbasińska	Poland	50.29	
4	3	Victoria Ohuruogu	Great Britain & N.I.	50.51	
5	1	Rhasidat Adeleke	Ireland	50.53	NR
6	8	Lieke Klaver	Netherlands	50.56	
7	7	Cynthia Bolingo	Belgium	50.94	
8	2	Iga Baumgart-Witan	Poland	51.28	
