= Croatia at the 2012 European Athletics Championships =

- WA code: CRO

in Helsinki
- Competitors: 11
- Medals: Gold 1 Silver 0 Bronze 0 Total 1

European Athletics Championships appearances
- 1994; 1998; 2002; 2006; 2010; 2012; 2014; 2016; 2018; 2022; 2024; 2026

Croatia competed at the 2012 European Athletics Championships held in Helsinki, Finland, between 27 June to 1 July 2012. It was represent by 11 athletes, 7 male and 4 female, winning one gold medal by Sandra Perković in discus throw.

== Medals ==
Medal	Name	Event	Date
Gold	Sandra Perković	Women's discus throw	1 July

== Results ==
=== Men ===
Field events

Event	Athletes	Qualification		Final	
Event	Athletes	Result	Rank	Result	Rank
Long jump	Dino Pervan	NM	–	did not advance	
Long jump	Marko Prugovečki	NM	–	did not advance	
Shot put	Nedžad Mulabegović	19.79	5 q	19.26	11
Shot put	Marin Premeru	18.71	20	did not advance	
Discus throw	Roland Varga	NM	–	did not advance	
Hammer throw	Andraš Haklić	69.31	27	did not advance	

=== Women ===
Track events

Event	Athletes	Heats		Semifinal		Final	
Event	Athletes	Result	Rank	Result	Rank	Result	Rank
400 m	Anita Banović	55.50	27	did not advance			
400 m hurdles	Nikolina Horvat	57.74	20	did not advance			

Field events

Event	Athletes	Qualification		Final	
Event	Athletes	Result	Rank	Result	Rank
High jump	Ana Šimić	1.82	20	did not advance	
Shot put	Valentina Muzarić	15.33	17	did not advance	
Discus throw	Sandra Perković	62.01	2 Q	67.62	1st place, gold medalist(s)
