= 2022 European Athletics Championships =

25th European Athletics Championships
- Dates: 15–21 August
- Host city: Munich, Germany
- Venue: Olympiastadion
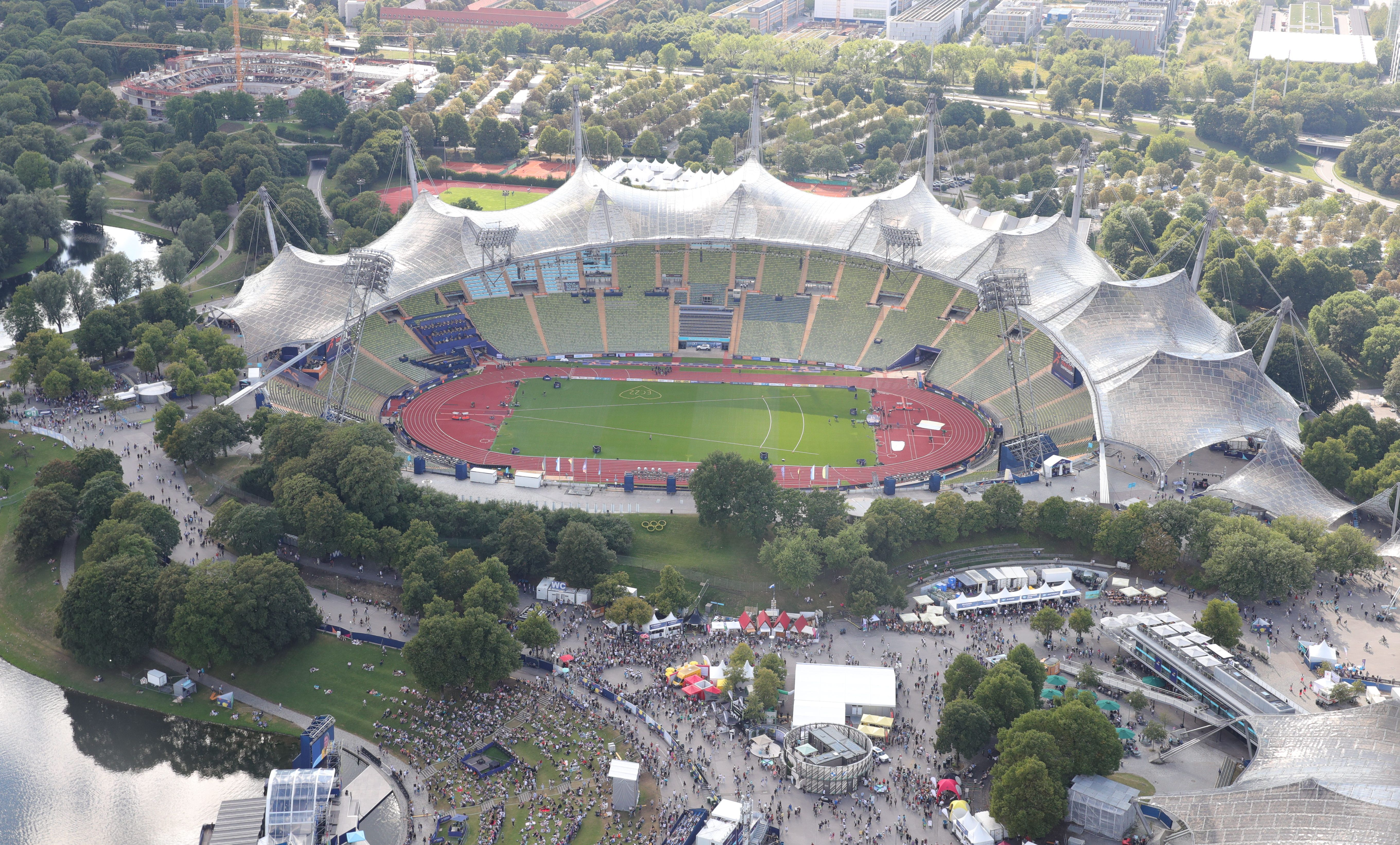
- Level: Senior
- Type: Outdoor
- Events: 50
- Participation: 1495 athletes from 48 nations

The 2022 European Athletics Championships were the 25th edition of the European Athletics Championships and were held in Munich, Germany, from 15 to 21 August 2022.

They were part of the European Championships, a multi-sport tournament which brings together the existing European Championships of some of the continent's sports.

The venue Olympiastadion had previously hosted the Athletics events during the 1972 Summer Olympics.

Germany headed the medal table on 7 gold medals, while Great Britain, second on gold medals won with 6, won the most overall medals, 20.

== Event schedule ==
Legend
Key	P	Q	H	½	F
Value	Preliminary round	Qualifiers	Heats	Semifinals	Final

M = morning session, E = evening session

Men
Date	Aug 15		Aug 16			Aug 17			Aug 18		Aug 19		Aug 20		Aug 21
Event	M	E	M	E		M	E		M	E	M	E	M	E	E
100 m	H			½	F										
200 m									H	½		F			
400 m		H	½				F								
800 m									H			½			F
1500 m		H								F					
5000 m				F											
10,000 m															F
Marathon	F														
3000 m steeplechase			H									F			
110 m hurdles			H				½	F							
400 m hurdles						H			½			F			
Decathlon	F														
High jump				Q						F					
Pole vault									Q					F	
Long jump	Q			F											
Triple jump		Q					F								
Shot put	Q	F													
Discus throw						Q						F			
Hammer throw						Q				F					
Javelin throw											Q				F
20 km walk													F		
35 km walk			F												
4 × 100 m relay											H				F
4 × 400 m relay											H			F	

Women
Date	Aug 15		Aug 16			Aug 17		Aug 18		Aug 19		Aug 20		Aug 21	
Event	M	E	M	E		M	E	M	E	M	E	M	E	E	
100 m	H			½	F										
200 m								H	½		F				
400 m		H	½				F								
800 m								H		½			F		
1500 m			H								F				
5000 m									F						
10,000 m		F													
Marathon	F														
3000 m steeplechase								H					F		
100 m hurdles													H	½	F
400 m hurdles						H		½			F				
Heptathlon						F									
High jump										Q				F	
Pole vault	Q						F								
Long jump			Q						F						
Triple jump						Q					F				
Shot put	Q	F													
Discus throw		Q		F											
Hammer throw			Q				F								
Javelin throw								Q					F		
20 km walk												F			
35 km walk			F												
4 × 100 m relay										H				F	
4 × 400 m relay										H			F		

== Results ==
=== Men ===
==== Track ====
The finish order of the 3000 metres steeplechase was rewritten by the EAA on 14 December 2023, following the doping disqualification of Italian Ahmed Abdelwahed, who had finished second.

As a result, Italian Osama Zoghlami moved up from bronze to silver, while the bronze medal was awarded to Spanish Daniel Arce, who had finished fourth.

Chronology: 2018 | 2020 | 2022 | 2024 | 2026

Event	Gold		Silver		Bronze	
100 metres	Marcell Jacobs; Italy (ITA)	9.95 =CR, SB	Zharnel Hughes; Great Britain & N.I. (GBR)	9.99	Jeremiah Azu; Great Britain & N.I. (GBR)	10.13 PB
200 metres	Zharnel Hughes; Great Britain & N.I. (GBR)	20.07 SB	Nethaneel Mitchell-Blake; Great Britain & N.I. (GBR)	20.17	Filippo Tortu; Italy (ITA)	20.27
400 metres	Matthew Hudson-Smith; Great Britain & N.I. (GBR)	44.53	Ricky Petrucciani; Switzerland (SUI)	45.03 SB	Alex Haydock-Wilson; Great Britain & N.I. (GBR)	45.17
800 metres	Mariano García; Spain (ESP)	1:44.85 PB	Jake Wightman; Great Britain & N.I. (GBR)	1:44.91 SB	Mark English; Ireland (IRL)	1:45.19
1500 metres	Jakob Ingebrigtsen; Norway (NOR)	3:32.76 CR	Jake Heyward; Great Britain & N.I. (GBR)	3:34.44	Mario García; Spain (ESP)	3:34.88
5000 metres	Jakob Ingebrigtsen; Norway (NOR)	13:21.13	Mohamed Katir; Spain (ESP)	13:22.98 SB	Yemaneberhan Crippa; Italy (ITA)	13:24.83
10,000 metres	Yemaneberhan Crippa; Italy (ITA)	27:46.13	Zerei Kbrom Mezngi; Norway (NOR)	27:46.94 PB	Yann Schrub; France (FRA)	27:47.13 PB
Marathon	Richard Ringer; Germany (GER)	2:10:21 SB	Maru Teferi; Israel (ISR)	2:10:23	Gashau Ayale; Israel (ISR)	2:10:29 SB
Marathon	Israel	6:31:48	Germany	6:35:52	Spain	6:38:44
110 metres hurdles	Asier Martínez; Spain (ESP)	13.14 =EL	Pascal Martinot-Lagarde; France (FRA)	13.14 =EL	Just Kwaou-Mathey; France (FRA)	13.33
400 metres hurdles	Karsten Warholm; Norway (NOR)	47.12 CR	Wilfried Happio; France (FRA)	48.56	Yasmani Copello; Turkey (TUR)	48.78
3000 metres steeplechase	Topi Raitanen; Finland (FIN)	8:21.80	Osama Zoghlami; Italy (ITA)	8:23.44	Daniel Arce; Spain (ESP)	8:25.00
4 × 100 metres relay	Great Britain & N.I. Jeremiah Azu; Zharnel Hughes; Jona Efoloko; Nethaneel Mitchell-Blake; Harry Aikines-Aryeetey*; Tommy Ramdhan*	37.67 CR	France; Méba-Mickaël Zeze; Pablo Matéo; Ryan Zeze; Jimmy Vicaut	37.94 SB	Poland; Adrian Brzeziński; Przemysław Słowikowski; Patryk Wykrota; Dominik Kopeć; Mateusz Siuda*	38.15 NR
4 × 400 metres relay	Great Britain & N.I. Matthew Hudson-Smith; Charlie Dobson; Lewis Davey; Alex Haydock-Wilson; Joe Brier*; Rio Mitcham*	2:59.35 SB	Belgium; Alexander Doom; Julien Watrin; Kévin Borlée; Dylan Borlée; Jonathan Borlée*; Jonathan Sacoor*	2:59.49	France; Gilles Biron; Loïc Prévot; Téo Andant; Thomas Jordier; Simon Boypa*	2:59.64 SB
20 kilometres walk	Álvaro Martín; Spain (ESP)	1:19:11 PB	Perseus Karlström; Sweden (SWE)	1:19:23	Diego García; Spain (ESP)	1:19:45 SB
35 kilometres walk	Miguel Ángel López; Spain (ESP)	2:26:49	Christopher Linke; Germany (GER)	2:29:30 PB	Matteo Giupponi; Italy (ITA)	2:30:34 PB
WR world record | ER European record | CR championship record | NR national record | WL world leading | EL European leading | PB personal best | SB seasonal best

==== Field ====
Chronology: 2018 | 2020 | 2022 | 2024 | 2026

Event	Gold		Silver		Bronze	
High jump	Gianmarco Tamberi; Italy (ITA)	2.30	Tobias Potye; Germany (GER)	2.27	Andriy Protsenko; Ukraine (UKR)	2.27
Pole vault	Armand Duplantis; Sweden (SWE)	6.06 CR	Bo Kanda Lita Baehre; Germany (GER)	5.85	Pål Haugen Lillefosse; Norway (NOR)	5.75
Long jump	Miltiadis Tentoglou; Greece (GRE)	8.52 CR, WL	Thobias Montler; Sweden (SWE)	8.06	Jules Pommery; France (FRA)	8.06
Triple jump	Pedro Pichardo; Portugal (POR)	17.50	Andrea Dallavalle; Italy (ITA)	17.04	Jean-Marc Pontvianne; France (FRA)	16.94
Shot put	Filip Mihaljević; Croatia (CRO)	21.88 SB	Armin Sinančević; Serbia (SRB)	21.39	Tomáš Staněk; Czech Republic (CZE)	21.26
Discus throw	Mykolas Alekna; Lithuania (LTU)	69.78 CR	Kristjan Čeh; Slovenia (SLO)	68.28	Lawrence Okoye; Great Britain & N.I. (GBR)	67.14 SB
Javelin throw	Julian Weber; Germany (GER)	87.66	Jakub Vadlejch; Czech Republic (CZE)	87.28	Lassi Etelätalo; Finland (FIN)	86.44 PB
Hammer throw	Wojciech Nowicki; Poland (POL)	82.00 WL	Bence Halász; Hungary (HUN)	80.92 PB	Eivind Henriksen; Norway (NOR)	79.45
WR world record | ER European record | CR championship record | NR national record | WL world leading | EL European leading | PB personal best | SB seasonal best

==== Combined ====
Event	Gold		Silver		Bronze	
Decathlon	Niklas Kaul; Germany (GER)	8545 SB	Simon Ehammer; Switzerland (SUI)	8468 NR	Janek Õiglane; Estonia (EST)	8346

=== Women ===
==== Track ====
Chronology: 2018 | 2020 | 2022 | 2024 | 2026

Event	Gold		Silver		Bronze	
100 metres	Gina Lückenkemper; Germany (GER)	10.99 =SB	Mujinga Kambundji; Switzerland (SUI)	10.99	Daryll Neita; Great Britain & N.I. (GBR)	11.00
200 metres	Mujinga Kambundji; Switzerland (SUI)	22.32	Dina Asher-Smith; Great Britain & N.I. (GBR)	22.43	Ida Karstoft; Denmark (DEN)	22.72
400 metres	Femke Bol; Netherlands (NED)	49.44 EL, NR	Natalia Kaczmarek; Poland (POL)	49.94	Anna Kiełbasińska; Poland (POL)	50.29
800 metres	Keely Hodgkinson; Great Britain & N.I. (GBR)	1:59.04	Rénelle Lamote; France (FRA)	1:59.49	Anna Wielgosz; Poland (POL)	1:59.87
1500 metres	Laura Muir; Great Britain & N.I. (GBR)	4:01.08	Ciara Mageean; Ireland (IRL)	4:02.56	Sofia Ennaoui; Poland (POL)	4:03.59
5000 metres	Konstanze Klosterhalfen; Germany (GER)	14:50.47	Yasemin Can; Turkey (TUR)	14:56.91	Eilish McColgan; Great Britain & N.I. (GBR)	14:59.34
10,000 metres	Yasemin Can; Turkey (TUR)	30:32.57	Eilish McColgan; Great Britain & N.I. (GBR)	30:41.05	Lonah Chemtai Salpeter; Israel (ISR)	30:46.37
Marathon	Aleksandra Lisowska; Poland (POL)	2:28:36 SB	Matea Parlov Koštro; Croatia (CRO)	2:28:42	Nienke Brinkman; Netherlands (NED)	2:28:52
Marathon	Germany	7:28:48	Spain	7:39:25	Poland	7:40:54
100 metres hurdles	Pia Skrzyszowska; Poland (POL)	12.53	Luca Kozák; Hungary (HUN)	12.69 =NR	Ditaji Kambundji; Switzerland (SUI)	12.74
400 metres hurdles	Femke Bol; Netherlands (NED)	52.67 CR	Viktoriya Tkachuk; Ukraine (UKR)	54.30	Anna Ryzhykova; Ukraine (UKR)	54.86
3000 metres steeplechase	Luiza Gega; Albania (ALB)	9:11.31 CR	Lea Meyer; Germany (GER)	9:15.35 PB	Elizabeth Bird; Great Britain & N.I. (GBR)	9:23.18
4 × 100 metres relay	Germany; Alexandra Burghardt; Lisa Mayer; Gina Lückenkemper; Rebekka Haase; Jessica-Bianca Wessolly*	42.34	Poland; Pia Skrzyszowska; Anna Kiełbasińska; Marika Popowicz-Drapała; Ewa Swoboda; Magdalena Stefanowicz*; Martyna Kotwiła*	42.61 NR	Italy; Zaynab Dosso; Dalia Kaddari; Anna Bongiorni; Alessia Pavese; Gloria Hooper*	42.84
4 × 400 metres relay	Netherlands; Eveline Saalberg; Lieke Klaver; Lisanne de Witte; Femke Bol; Andrea Bouma*; Laura de Witte*	3:20.87 EL, NR	Poland; Anna Kiełbasińska; Iga Baumgart-Witan; Justyna Święty-Ersetic; Natalia Kaczmarek; Kinga Gacka*; Małgorzata Hołub-Kowalik*	3:21.68 SB	Great Britain; Victoria Ohuruogu; Ama Pipi; Jodie Williams; Nicole Yeargin; Zoey Clark*; Laviai Nielsen*	3:21.74 SB
20 kilometres walk	Antigoni Drisbioti; Greece (GRE)	1:29:03 PB	Katarzyna Zdziebło; Poland (POL)	1:29:20	Saskia Feige; Germany (GER)	1:29:25 PB
35 kilometres walk	Antigoni Drisbioti; Greece (GRE)	2:47:00	Raquel González; Spain (ESP)	2:49:10	Viktória Madarász; Hungary (HUN)	2:49:58 PB
WR world record | ER European record | CR championship record | NR national record | WL world leading | EL European leading | PB personal best | SB seasonal best

==== Field ====
Chronology: 2018 | 2020 | 2022 | 2024 | 2026

Event	Gold		Silver		Bronze	
High jump	Yaroslava Mahuchikh; Ukraine (UKR)	1.95	Marija Vuković; Montenegro (MNE)	1.95	Angelina Topić; Serbia (SRB)	1.93
Pole vault	Wilma Murto; Finland (FIN)	4.85 =CR, NR	Katerina Stefanidi; Greece (GRE)	4.75 SB	Tina Šutej; Slovenia (SLO)	4.75
Long jump	Ivana Vuleta; Serbia (SRB)	7.06 =SB	Malaika Mihambo; Germany (GER)	7.03	Jazmin Sawyers; Great Britain & N.I. (GBR)	6.80
Triple jump	Maryna Bekh-Romanchuk; Ukraine (UKR)	15.02 EL	Kristiina Mäkelä; Finland (FIN)	14.64 NR	Hanna Knyazyeva-Minenko; Israel (ISR)	14.45
Shot put	Jessica Schilder; Netherlands (NED)	20.24 EL	Auriol Dongmo; Portugal (POR)	19.82 NR	Jorinde van Klinken; Netherlands (NED)	18.94
Discus throw	Sandra Perković; Croatia (CRO)	67.95	Kristin Pudenz; Germany (GER)	67.87 PB	Claudine Vita; Germany (GER)	65.20 SB
Javelin throw	Elina Tzengko; Greece (GRE)	65.81 PB	Adriana Vilagoš; Serbia (SRB)	62.01	Barbora Špotáková; Czech Republic (CZE)	60.68
Hammer throw	Bianca Ghelber; Romania (ROU)	72.72	Ewa Różańska; Poland (POL)	72.12 PB	Sara Fantini; Italy (ITA)	71.58
WR world record | ER European record | CR championship record | NR national record | WL world leading | EL European leading | PB personal best | SB seasonal best

==== Combined ====
Event	Gold		Silver		Bronze	
Heptathlon	Nafissatou Thiam; Belgium (BEL)	6628	Adrianna Sułek; Poland (POL)	6532	Annik Kälin; Switzerland (SUI)	6515 NR

== Medal table ==
After all 50 events.

Medal table updated following the 2020 doping disqualification of Italian Ahmed Abdelwahed, who had finished second in the 3000m steeplechase.

* Host nation (Germany)

Rank	Nation	Gold	Silver	Bronze	Total
1	Germany*	7	7	2	16
2	Great Britain & N.I.	6	6	8	20
3	Spain	4	3	4	11
4	Greece	4	1	0	5
5	Netherlands	4	0	2	6
6	Poland	3	6	5	14
7	Italy	3	2	5	10
8	Norway	3	1	2	6
9	Ukraine	2	1	2	5
10	Finland	2	1	1	4
11	Croatia	2	1	0	3
12	Switzerland	1	3	2	6
13	Serbia	1	2	1	4
14	Sweden	1	2	0	3
15	Israel	1	1	3	5
16	Turkey	1	1	1	3
17	Belgium	1	1	0	2
17	Portugal	1	1	0	2
19	Albania	1	0	0	1
19	Lithuania	1	0	0	1
19	Romania	1	0	0	1
22	France	0	4	5	9
23	Hungary	0	2	1	3
24	Czech Republic	0	1	2	3
25	Ireland	0	1	1	2
25	Slovenia	0	1	1	2
27	Montenegro	0	1	0	1
28	Denmark	0	0	1	1
28	Estonia	0	0	1	1
Totals (29 entries)		50	50	50	150

== Placing table ==
After 50 events of 50.

Rank	Nation	1st		2nd		3rd		4th		5th		6th		7th		8th		Total
Rank	Nation	Pl	Pts	Pl	Pts	Pl	Pts	Pl	Pts	Pl	Pts	Pl	Pts	Pl	Pts	Pl	Pts	Total
1	Great Britain	6	48	6	42	8	48	4	20	5	20	8	24	7	13	5	5	220
2	Germany	7	56	7	49	2	12	4	20	7	28	6	18	3	6	8	8	197
3	Italy	3	24	2	14	6	36	4	20	6	24	2	6	8	15,5	3	3	142,5
4	Spain	4	32	3	21	3	18	7	35	1	4	5	15	3	6	1	1	132
5	Poland	3	24	6	42	5	30	3	15	2	8	2	6	1	2	1	1	128
6	France		0	4	28	5	30	3	15	4	16	4	12	4	8	6	6	115
7	Netherlands	4	32		0	2	12	7	35	4	16	1	3		0	1	1	99
8	Switzerland	1	8	3	21	2	12	3	14,5	2	8		0	3	6		0	69,5
9	Ukraine	2	16	1	7	2	12	3	15	2	8	1	3	1	2	1	1	64
10	Sweden	1	8	2	14		0	5	25	1	4	1	3	2	4	2	2	60
11	Norway	3	24	1	7	2	12		0	1	4	2	6	2	4		0	57
12	Belgium	1	8	1	7		0	3	15	2	8	3	9	1	2	3	3	52
13	Finland	2	16	1	7	1	6		0	2	8	1	3	1	2	1	1	43
14	Israel	1	8	1	7	3	18		0	1	4		0	2	4	2	2	43
15	Greece	4	32	1	7		0		0		0	1	3		0		0	42
16	Ireland		0	1	7	1	6		0	3	12	3	9	1	2	2	2	38
17	Czech Republic		0	1	7	2	12	1	5		0	2	6	3	6	1	1	37
18	Serbia	1	8	2	14	1	6		0		0		0	1	2	1	1	31
19	Hungary		0	2	14	1	6	1	5	1	4		0	1	2		0	31
20	Turkey	1	8	1	7	1	6		0	1	4		0	2	4		0	29
21	Croatia	2	16	1	7		0		0		0	1	3		0	1	1	27
22	Portugal	1	8	1	7		0		0	2	8		0		0	2	2	25
23	Slovenia		0	1	7	1	6		0	1	4		0	1	1,5		0	18,5
24	Lithuania	1	8		0		0		0		0	2	6		0		0	14
25	Romania	1	8		0		0		0		0	1	3	1	2	1	1	14
26	Denmark		0		0	1	6	1	4,5		0	1	3		0		0	13,5
27	Estonia		0		0	1	6		0	1	4	1	3		0		0	13
28	Slovakia		0		0		0	1	5		0	1	3	1	2		0	10
29	Albania	1	8		0		0		0		0		0		0		0	8
30	Montenegro		0	1	7		0		0		0		0		0		0	7
31	Latvia		0		0		0		0		0	1	3	1	2	1	1	6
32	Azerbaijan		0		0		0	1	5		0		0		0		0	5
33	Moldova		0		0		0		0		0		0	1	2		0	2
34	Bulgaria		0		0		0		0		0		0		0	1	1	1
34	Cyprus		0		0		0		0		0		0		0	1	1	1

== Entry standards ==
Entry standards and conditions were published in August 2021.

For the entry standards and for the rankings, the valid qualification period was:

- 12 months, from 27 July 2021 to 26 July 2022, for all events but the following,
- From 1 January 2021 to 26 July 2022 for each relay teams (16 teams for each event);
- 18 months, from 27 January 2021 to 26 July 2022, for the 10,000m, Marathons, 20 km & 35 km Race Walks and Combined Events.

Event	Men	Women	Target number
100 metres	10.16	11.24	36
200 metres	20.43	23.05	36
400 metres	45.70	51.70	36
800 metres	1:45.90	2:00.40	32
1500 metres	3:36.00	4:06.00	30
5000 metres	13:24.00	15:25.00	30
10,000 metres	28:15.00	32:20.00	27
3000 metres steeplechase	8:30.00	9:39.00	34
110/100 metre hurdles	13.50	12.93	36
400 metres hurdles	49.50	55.85	36
Marathon	2:14.30	2:32.00	60
20 kilometres race walk	1:22:10	1:32:15	35
35 kilometres race walk	2:35:30 (or 3:54:00 in 50km RW)	2:55:00 (or 4:25:00 in 50km RW)	35
High jump	2.30 m	1.95 m	26
Pole vault	5.75 m	4.60 m	26
Long jump	8.10 m	6.79 m	26
Triple jump	16.95 m	14.25 m	26
Shot put	20.85 m	18.20 m	26
Discus throw	65.20 m	60.50 m	26
Hammer throw	77.00 m	71.80 m	26
Javelin throw	84.00 m	62.50 m	26
Decathlon/Heptathlon	8100	6250	24
4 × 100 metres relay	–	–	16
4 × 400 metres relay	–	–	16

== Participating nations ==
1495 athletes, 713 females and 782 males, from 48 countries, including the Athlete Refugee Team, are expected to participate. As a result of the 2022 Russian invasion of Ukraine, athletes from Russia and Belarus are banned from competing at the 2022 European Championships. No athlete represented Liechtenstein or Monaco in athletics these championships.

- Albania (1)
- Andorra (1)
- Armenia (2)
- Athlete Refugee Team (2)
- Austria (14)
- Azerbaijan (4)
- Belgium (61)
- Bosnia and Herzegovina (2)
- Bulgaria (6)
- Croatia (11)
- Cyprus (7)
- Czech Republic (53)
- Denmark (28)
- Estonia (12)
- Finland (75)
- France (99)
- Georgia (2)
- Germany (120)
- Gibraltar (2)
- Great Britain & N.I. (116)
- Greece (40)
- Hungary (46)
- Iceland (3)
- Ireland (38)
- Israel (15)
- Italy (98)
- Kosovo (2)
- Latvia (8)
- Lithuania (19)
- Luxembourg (4)
- Malta (2)
- Moldova (7)
- Montenegro (2)
- Netherlands (59)
- North Macedonia (2)
- Norway (46)
- Poland (80)
- Portugal (45)
- Romania (21)
- San Marino (2)
- Serbia (14)
- Slovakia (19)
- Slovenia (22)
- Spain (89)
- Sweden (52)
- Switzerland (48)
- Turkey (41)
- Ukraine (53)
