= 2022 European Athletics Championships – Women's 400 metres hurdles =

Women's 400 metres hurdles at the 2022 European Athletics Championships
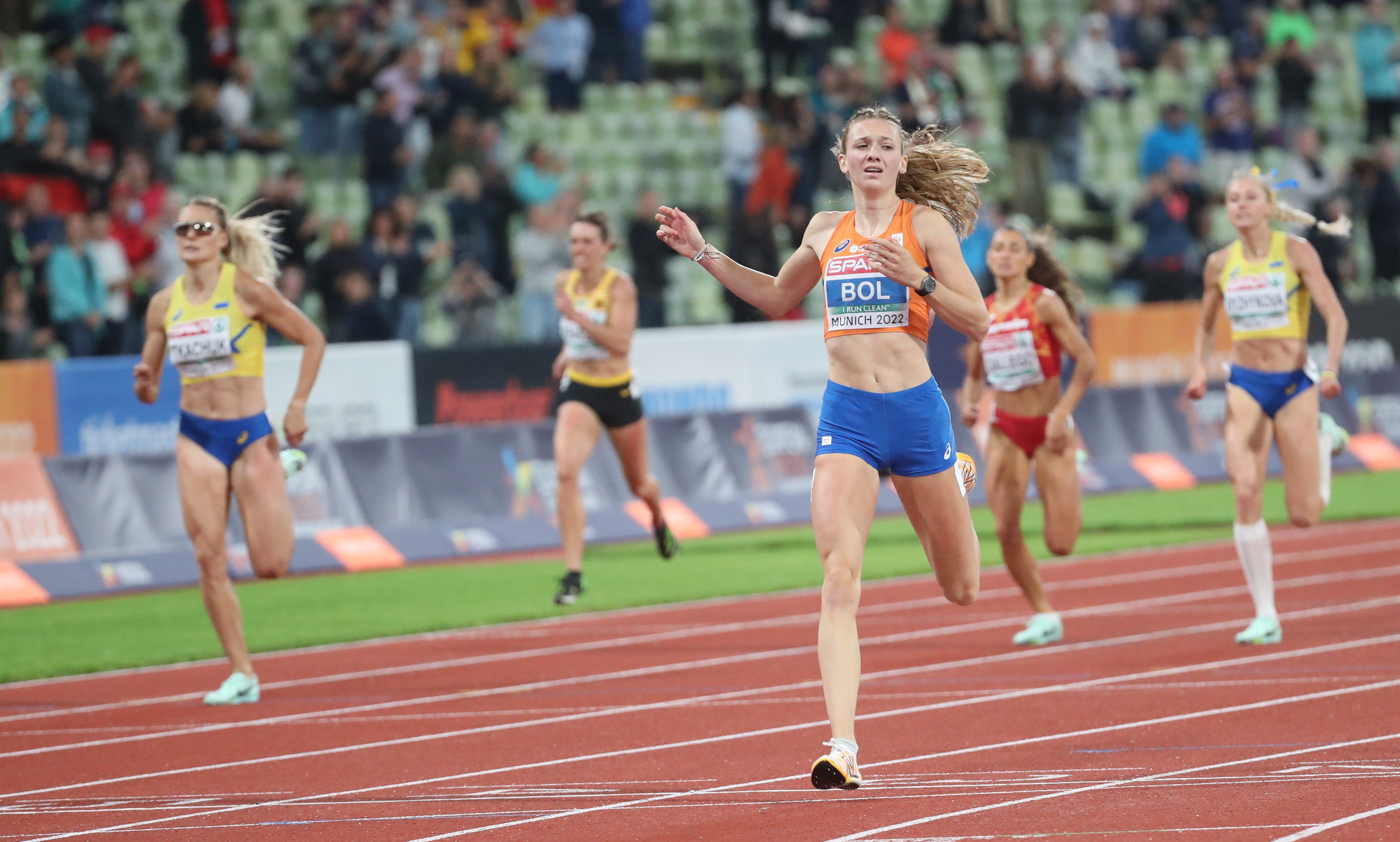
- Femke Bol (right of the center) finishing first in the final
- Venue: Olympiastadion
- Location: Munich, Germany
- Dates: 17 August 2022 (round 1); 18 August 2022 (semi-finals); 19 August 2022 (final)
- Competitors: 36 from 21 nations
- Winning time: 52.67 s CR

Medalists
gold medal	Femke Bol	Netherlands
silver medal	Viktoriya Tkachuk	Ukraine
bronze medal	Anna Ryzhykova	Ukraine

The women's 400 metres hurdles at the 2022 European Athletics Championships was held over three rounds at the Olympiastadion in Munich, Germany, from 17 to 19 August 2022. It was the fourteenth time that the event was contested at the European Athletics Championships. Thirty-six athletes from twenty-one nations competed.

In round 1 on 17 August, twelve out of twenty-four athletes qualified for the semi-finals, where they were joined by the twelve highest-ranking athletes who had a bye in the first round. In the semi-finals on 18 August, eight out of twenty-four athletes qualified for the final and Viivi Lehikoinen set a Finnish record of 54.50 seconds. In the final on 19 August, Femke Bol of the Netherlands won in a new championship record of 52.67 s, followed by Viktoriya Tkachuk of Ukraine in 54.30 s and Anna Ryzhykova of Ukraine in 54.86 s.

== Background ==
Before 2022, the women's 400 metres hurdles had been contested fourteen times at the European Athletics Championships: every four years between the 1978 and 2010, and every two years since then, with the exception of the 2020 European Athletics Championships that were cancelled due to the COVID-19 pandemic. The 2022 edition was held at the Olympic Stadium in Munich, Germany.

At the start of the 2022 championships, Sydney McLaughlin of the United States held the world record of 50.68 s, which was also the world leading performance that season; Femke Bol of the Netherlands held the European record of 52.03 s and European leading performance of 52.27 s; and Natalya Antyukh of Russia held the championship record of 52.92 s. The previous 2018 edition was won by Léa Sprunger of Switzerland in 54.33 s.

Records before the 2022 European Athletics Championships
Record	Athlete (nation)	Time	Location	Date
World record	Sydney McLaughlin (USA)	50.68	Eugene, United States	22 July 2022
European record	Femke Bol (NED)	52.03	Tokyo, Japan	4 August 2021
Championship record	Natalya Antyukh (RUS)	52.92	Barcelona, Spain	30 July 2010
World leading	Sydney McLaughlin (USA)	50.68	Eugene, United States	22 July 2022
Europe Lleading	Femke Bol (NED)	52.27	Stockholm, Sweden	30 June 2022

== Qualification ==
For the women's 400 metres hurdles, the qualification period was from 27 July 2021 to 26 July 2022. Athletes could qualify during that time by running the entry standard of 55.85 seconds or faster, by a receiving a wild card as defending European 400 metres hurdles champion, or by their position on the World Athletics Rankings for the event. A final entry list of thirty-nine athletes from twenty-one nations was compiled on 8 August 2022.

== Rounds ==
=== Round 1 ===
Twenty-four athletes from nineteen nations competed in three heats (preliminary rounds) of round 1 on 17 August, starting at 11:40 (UTC+2). The first three athletes in each heat (Q) and the next three fastest athletes overall (q) advanced to the semi-finals. The twelve highest-ranked athletes received a bye into the semi-finals. Three athletes set a personal best (PB) in this round, whilst one set a seasons best (SB).

Results of round 1
Rank	Heat	Lane	Name	Nation	Time	Note
1	2	4	Carolina Krafzik	Germany	54.32	Q, PB
2	3	1	Nikoleta Jíchová	Czech Republic	55.93	Q
3	1	2	Annina Fahr	Switzerland	56.16	Q, PB
4	1	6	Camille Seri	France	56.18	Q
5	1	5	Rebecca Sartori	Italy	56.44	Q
6	3	7	Dimitra Gnafaki	Greece	56.45	Q, PB
7	3	8	Hayley McLean	(United Kingdom) Great Britain and Northern Ireland	56.64	Q
8	2	3	Yasmin Giger	Switzerland	56.69	Q
9	1	1	Kristiina Halonen	Finland	56.70	q
10	1	7	Nina Hespel	Belgium	56.72	q
11	1	8	Elisabeth Slettum	Norway	56.72	q
12	2	5	Daniela Ledecká	Slovakia	56.98	Q
13	2	7	Carla García	Spain	57.03	
14	2	1	Linda Olivieri	Italy	57.03	
15	3	2	Gisèle Wender	Germany	57.09	
16	3	6	Vera Barbosa	Portugal	57.10	
17	1	4	Eileen Demes	Germany	57.11	
18	2	2	Lena Pressler	Austria	57.33	
19	3	3	Janka Molnár	Hungary	57.38	
20	2	6	Agata Zupin	Slovenia	57.42	
21	3	5	Marielle Kleemeier	Estonia	57.46	
22	2	8	Annemarie Nissen	Denmark	57.71	
23	3	4	Emma Zapletalová	Slovakia	58.65	SB
24	1	3	Drita Islami	North Macedonia	1:01.56	

=== Semi-finals ===
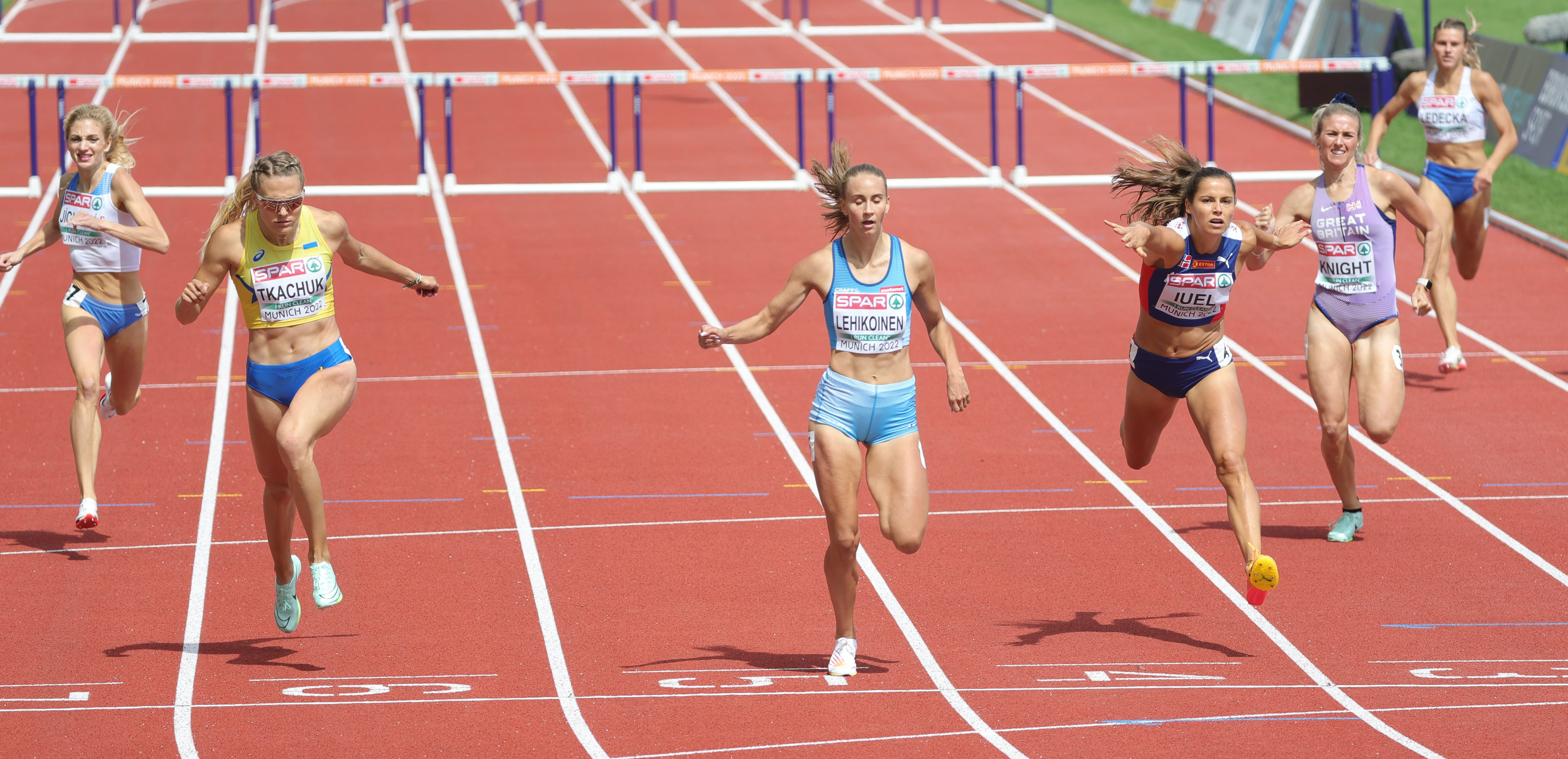
Viivi Lehikoinen (center) set a Finnish record of 54.50 s in the semis.

Twenty-four athletes from fourteen nations competed in three heats of the semi-finals held on 18 August, starting at 11:55 (UTC+2). The first two athletes in each heat (Q) and the next two fastest athletes overall (q) advanced to the final. Viivi Lehikoinen set a Finnish record (NR) of 54.50 seconds and another three athletes set personal bests (PB) in this round. Camille Seri of France did not finish (DNF) the race.

Results of the semi-finals
Rank	Heat	Lane	Name	Nation	Time	Note
1	3	6	Femke Bol*	Netherlands	53.73	Q
2	3	4	Anna Ryzhykova*	Ukraine	54.25	Q, SB
3	2	5	Viivi Lehikoinen*	Finland	54.50	Q, NR
4	2	6	Viktoriya Tkachuk*	Ukraine	54.65	Q
5	2	4	Amalie Iuel*	Norway	54.68	q, PB
6	3	3	Ayomide Folorunso*	Italy	54.98	q
7	1	6	Sara Gallego*	Spain	55.16	Q
8	1	3	Carolina Krafzik	Germany	55.29	Q
9	3	5	Hanne Claes*	Belgium	55.31	
10	2	3	Jessie Knight*	(United Kingdom) Great Britain and Northern Ireland	55.39	
11	2	7	Nikoleta Jíchová	Czech Republic	55.48	PB
12	1	5	Line Kloster*	Norway	55.63	
13	1	1	Dimitra Gnafaki	Greece	56.14	PB
13	2	8	Paulien Couckuyt*	Belgium	56.14	
15	3	8	Hayley McLean	(United Kingdom) Great Britain and Northern Ireland	56.20	
16	3	7	Elisabeth Slettum	Norway	56.61	
17	3	1	Kristiina Halonen	Finland	56.82	
18	2	1	Annina Fahr	Switzerland	57.07	
19	2	2	Daniela Ledecká	Slovakia	57.08	
20	3	2	Yasmin Giger	Switzerland	57.13	
21	1	4	Lina Nielsen*	(United Kingdom) Great Britain and Northern Ireland	57.19	
22	1	7	Rebecca Sartori	Italy	57.29	
23	1	2	Nina Hespel	Belgium	59.15	
	1	8	Camille Seri	France	DNF	

*Athletes who received a bye into the semi-finals

=== Final ===
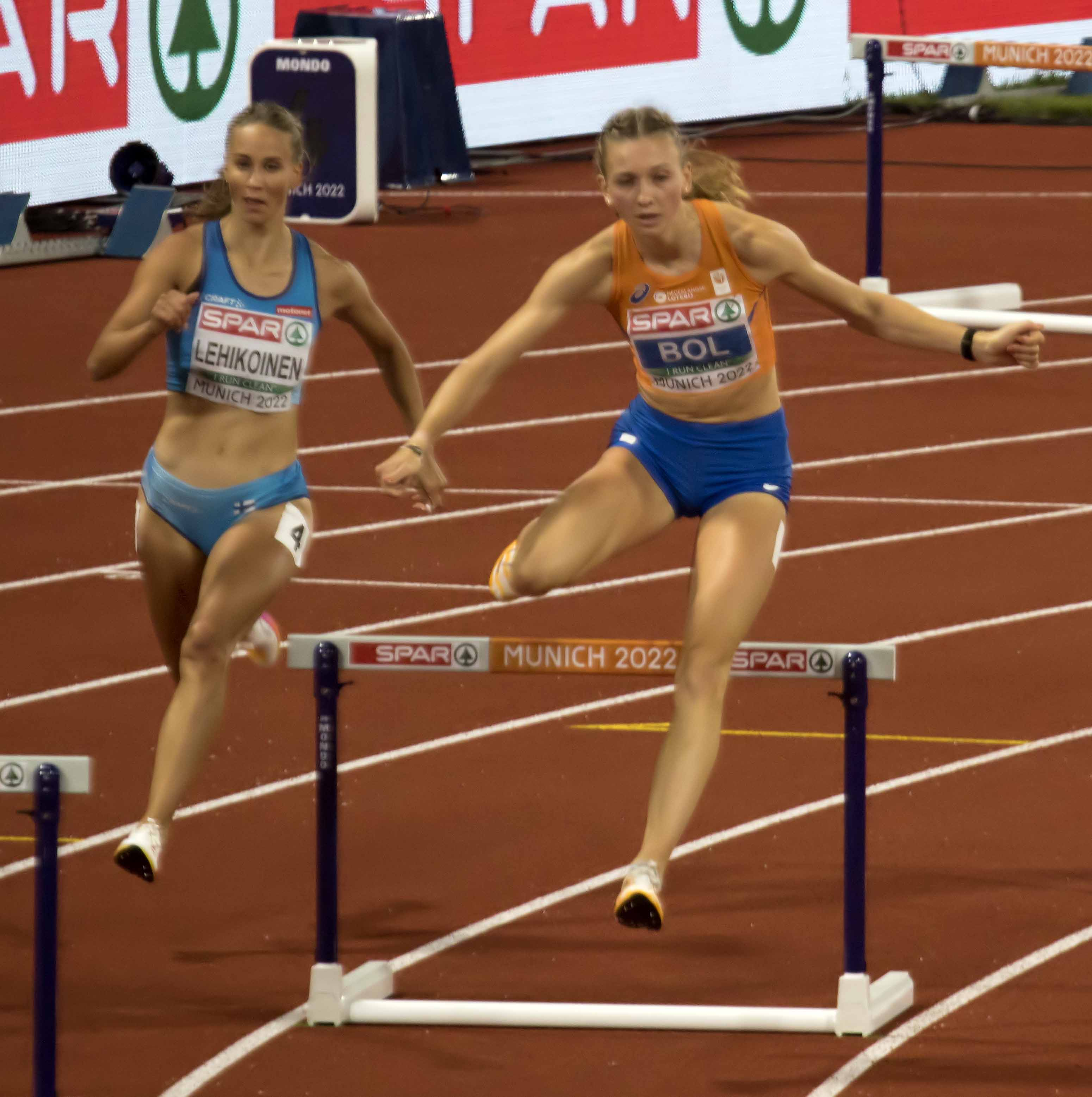
Femke Bol (right) won the final in a championship record of 52.67 seconds

Eight athletes from seven nations competed in the final on 19 August, starting at 21:45 (UTC+2) in the evening. Femke Bol of the Netherlands moved into the first position between 200 and 300 metres, and won in a new championship record (CR) of 52.67 seconds, improving the 12-year-old record of Natalya Antyukh by 0.25 seconds. Viktoriya Tkachuk of Ukraine finished in second place in 54.30 seconds and Anna Ryzhykova of Ukraine in third place in 54.86 seconds.

Steve Smythe from Athletics Weekly wrote that Bol finished "with a huge winning margin (...) by a staggering 1.63 seconds". Bol said about the race: "I don't have to do crazy things, just had to produce a decent race. But there is also a little bit of relief. I run my second-best time of this season." Two days earlier, Bol had also won the women's 400 metres; this double victory was unprecedented at the European Athletics Championships. Bol said about the double: "I am so proud to achieve the double. I will never do the double again. Well, maybe. Never say never!"

Results of the final
Rank	Lane	Name	Nation	Time	Note
1st place, gold medalist(s)	3	Femke Bol	Netherlands	52.67	CR
2nd place, silver medalist(s)	7	Viktoriya Tkachuk	Ukraine	54.30	
3rd place, bronze medalist(s)	5	Anna Ryzhykova	Ukraine	54.86	
4	6	Sara Gallego	Spain	54.97	
5	1	Amalie Iuel	Norway	55.32	
6	4	Viivi Lehikoinen	Finland	55.58	
7	2	Ayomide Folorunso	Italy	55.91	
8	8	Carolina Krafzik	Germany	56.02	
