= Croatia at the 2018 European Athletics Championships =

- WA code: CRO
- National federation: HAS
- Website: www.has.hr

in Berlin
- Competitors: 21 (10 men and 11 women) in 15 events
- Medals Ranked =18th: Gold 1 Silver 0 Bronze 0 Total 1

European Athletics Championships appearances
- 1994; 1998; 2002; 2006; 2010; 2012; 2014; 2016; 2018; 2022; 2024; 2026

Croatia competed at the 2018 European Athletics Championships in Berlin, Germany, from 6–12 August 2018. A delegation of 21 athletes, 10 male and 11 female, were sent to represent the country, selected by the Croatia Athletics Federation. Sandra Perković won gold medal in discus throw.

== Medals ==
Medal	Name	Event	Date
Gold	Sandra Perković	Women's discus throw	11 August

== Results ==
Men
Track and road

Athletes	Event	Heats		Semifinal		Final	
Athletes	Event	Result	Rank	Result	Rank	Result	Rank
Mateo Ružić	400 metres	47.32	27	did not advance			
Sven Cepuš	800 metres	1:47.56	13	did not advance			
Daniel Daly	Marathon	—N/a				2:29:25	56
Hrvoje Čukman	400 metres hurdles	52.93	24	did not advance			
Sven Cepuš; Hrvoje Čukman; Mateo Kovačić; Mateo Ružić	4 × 400 metres relay	3:07.80 SB	12	—N/a		did not advance	
Bruno Erent	50 km walk	—N/a				4:24:20	25

Field events

Athletes	Event	Qualification		Final	
Athletes	Event	Distance	Position	Distance	Position
Ivan Horvat	Pole vault	5.36	=22	did not advance	
Filip Pravdica	Long jump	7.52	23	did not advance	
Filip Mihaljević	Shot put	19.32	22	did not advance	
Stipe Žunić	Shot put	20.61	2 Q	20.73	7

Women
Track and road

Athletes	Event	Heats		Semifinal		Final	
Athletes	Event	Result	Rank	Result	Rank	Result	Rank
Bojana Bjeljac	Marathon	—N/a				2:37:31 PB	20
Matea Matošević	Marathon	—N/a				2:56:29	45
Nikolina Stepan	Marathon	—N/a				2:47:55	41
Nikolina Šustić	Marathon	—N/a				2:42:44 PB	34
Andrea Ivančević	100 metres hurdles	Bye		13.13	17	did not advance	
Ivana Lončarek	100 metres hurdles	13.23	13	did not advance			
Ivana Renić	50 km walk	—N/a				4:35:39 NR	10

Field events

Athletes	Event	Qualification		Final	
Athletes	Event	Distance	Position	Distance	Position
Ana Šimić	High jump	1.90	=7 q	1.87	=10
Sandra Perković	Discus throw	64.54	1 Q	67.62	1st place, gold medalist(s)
Marija Tolj	Discus throw	55.52	16	did not advance	
Anamari Kožul	Hammer throw	62.55	25	did not advance	
