= Croatia at the 2014 European Athletics Championships =

- WA code: CRO

in Zürich
- Competitors: 23
- Medals: Gold 1 Silver 0 Bronze 1 Total 2

European Athletics Championships appearances
- 1994; 1998; 2002; 2006; 2010; 2012; 2014; 2016; 2018; 2022; 2024; 2026

Croatia competed at the 2014 European Athletics Championships in Zurich, Switzerland, between 12 and 17 August 2014. A delegation of 23 athletes were sent to represent the country. Sandra Perković won gold in discus throw and Ana Šimić bronze in high jump.

== Medals ==
Medal	Name	Event	Date
Gold	Sandra Perković	Women's discus throw	16 August 2014
Bronze	Ana Šimić	Women's high jump	17 August 2014
