= Nienke Brinkman =

Dutch athlete

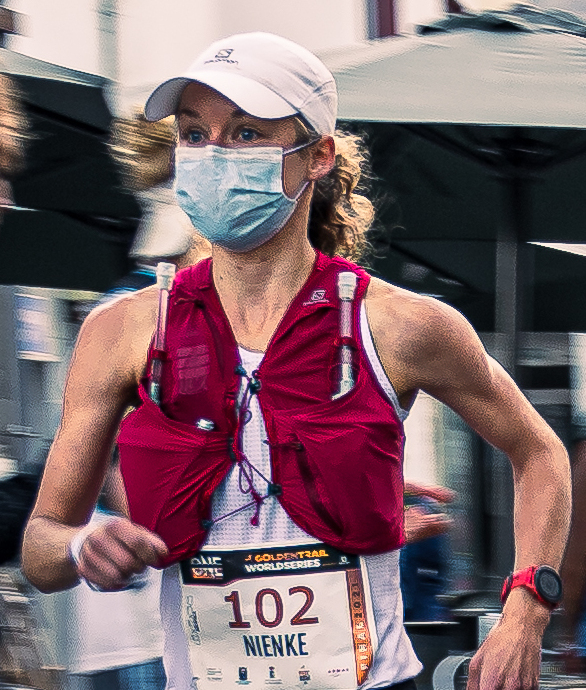
- Nienke Brinkman in 2021

Personal information
- Nationality: Dutch
- Born: 28 October 1993 (age 32) Jakarta, Indonesia

Sport
- Country: Netherlands
- Sport: Athletics
- Event(s): Marathon, Mountain running
- Team: NN Running Team
Medal record
Women's athletics
Representing the Netherlands
European Championships
Bronze medal – third place	2022 Munich	Marathon

Nienke Brinkman (pronounced [ˈniŋkə ˈbrɪŋkmɑn]; born 28 October 1993) is a Dutch long-distance runner, both on the road as well as on trails. She won the bronze medal in the marathon at the 2022 European Athletics Championships, which was her first international medal, and has a personal best of 2:22:51 which she ran at the Rotterdam Marathon.

== Early and personal life ==
Nienke Brinkman was brought up in Leiderdorp in the South Holland province. She was born on born 28 October 1993in Jakarta, Indonesia, where her Dutch parents were briefly living. She was a keen field hockey player and played in the Dutch National League 2 as a midfielder. After moving to Zürich to complete a PhD in geophysics, Brinkman discovered that field hockey was only a fringe sport in Switzerland, and began to run as a hobby.

== Career ==
In 2019, Brinkman entered the Zermatt Marathon, where she placed sixth. To relieve stress, she intensified her running training during the COVID-19 pandemic lockdown. She planned to participate at the Amsterdam Marathon in October, but pandemic restrictions meant that it was cancelled. Instead of this, Brinkman successfully completed 2 marathons within the space of a month on a lap of Lake Zurich, running 2:43 and 2:39.

In July 2021, Brinkman ran the mountainous Zermatt Marathon for the second time, which she won in a course record of 3:19:43. This time was over 40 minutes faster than her time in her first participation the year before. In the rest of the year, Brinkman took part in the mountain and trail running of the Golden Trail World Series, where she finished in second place at the Sierre-Zinal and won the Chiemgau Trail Run and Skyrhune. At the series final on El Hierro, she was again second to take the same position in the overall ranking. At the end of the year, Brinkman successfully reached the start of her first road marathon; in December, she ran 2:26:34 for 13th at the Valencia Marathon. At the time, this was the third-fastest time ever achieved by a Dutchwoman.

In January 2022, Brinkman joined the NN Running Team. At the Rotterdam Marathon in April, she ran a nearly-4-minute personal best of 2:22:51 for second. Her time broke the Dutch record set in 2003 by Lornah Kiplagat. This result also meant that in August, she travelled with the fastest time of the field to the 2022 European Athletics Championships in Munich, where she ended up finishing third in the race after experiencing stomach problems. As well as these starts in road races, Brinkman also continued to line up in trail races. Before the European Championships, she had already won at Zegama-Aizkorri in the Basque Country, and at Pikes Peak Ascent and Flagstaff Sky Peaks in the USA. She finished off her season by winning the Madeira Ocean and Trail Five-Day Stage Race, which secured herself the overall Golden Trail Series win.
