= Romania at the 2024 European Athletics Championships =

- Flag of Romania
- WA code: ROU

in Rome, Italy 7 June 2024 – 12 June 2022
- Competitors: 23 (8 men and 15 women)
- Medals Ranked 23rd: Gold 0 Silver 1 Bronze 0 Total 1

European Athletics Championships appearances
- 1934; 1938; 1946; 1950; 1954; 1958; 1962; 1966; 1969; 1971; 1974; 1978; 1982; 1986; 1990; 1994; 1998; 2002; 2006; 2010; 2012; 2014; 2016; 2018; 2022; 2024

Romania competed at the 2024 European Athletics Championships in Rome, Italy from 7–12 June 2024.

== Medallists ==
Medal	Name	Event	Date
Silver	Joan Chelimo	Women's half marathon	9 June

== Results ==
Romania entered the following athletes.

Key

- Q = Qualified for the next round
- q = Qualified for the next round as a fastest loser or, in field events, by position without achieving the qualifying target
- NR = National record
- PB = Personal best
- SB = Season best
- N/A = Round not applicable for the event

=== Men ===
Track and road events

Athlete	Event	Heat		Semifinal		Final	
Athlete	Event	Result	Rank	Result	Rank	Result	Rank
Nicolae Soare	Half marathon	—N/a				1:08:31	55
Alin Anton	110 metres hurdles	13.90	16	Did not advance			

Field events

Athlete	Event	Qualification		Final	
Athlete	Event	Distance	Position	Distance	Position
Răzvan Grecu	Triple jump	16.48 SB	12 q	15.96	13
Răzvan-Ioan Nicoară	Triple jump	16.13	19	Did not advance	
Marius Musteațǎ	Shot put	17.46	27	Did not advance	
Andrei Toader	Shot put	20.13	9 q	20.43	7
Alin Firfirică	Discus throw	61.72	14	Did not advance	
Alexandru Novac	Javelin throw	77.57	17	Did not advance	

=== Women ===
Track and road events

Athlete	Event	Heat		Semifinal		Final	
Athlete	Event	Result	Rank	Result	Rank	Result	Rank
Andrea Miklós	400 metres	Bye		51.13	7 Q	50.71 SB	5
Lenuța Simiuc	1500 metres	4:23.56	14	—N/a		Did not advance	
Joan Chelimo Melly	Half marathon	—N/a				1:08:55	2nd place, silver medalist(s)
Delvine Relin Meringor	Half marathon	—N/a				1:09:25 SB	4
Madalina-Elena Sirbu	Half marathon	—N/a				1:17:08	65
Joan Chelimo Melly; Delvine Relin Meringor; Madalina-Elena Sirbu	Half marathon team	—N/a				3:35:28	6
Anamaria Nesteriuc	100 metres hurdles	14.09 SB	21	Did not advance			
Alexandra Uță	400 metres hurdles	DNF		Did not advance			
Maria Blaga	3000 metres steeplechase	10:32.84	16	—N/a		Did not advance	
Stella Rutto	3000 metres steeplechase	9:30.00	1 Q	—N/a		9:22.36 PB	4
Maria Lătărețu	20 kilometres walk	—N/a				1:39:22	28

Field events

Athlete	Event	Qualification		Final	
Athlete	Event	Distance	Position	Distance	Position
Florentina Iușco	Long jump	6.58	15	Did not advance	
Alina Rotaru-Kottmann	Long jump	6.71 =SB	5 Q	6.68	9
Diana Ion	Triple jump	14.09 SB	6 q	14.23 PB	5
Florentina Iușco	Triple jump	14.11	4 Q	13.76	9
Elena Taloș	Triple jump	13.59	20	Did not advance	
Bianca Ghelber	Hammer throw	66.70	20	Did not advance	
