= Romania at the 2018 European Athletics Championships =

- WA code: ROU
- National federation: FRA
- Website: www.fra.ro

in Berlin
- Competitors: 36

European Athletics Championships appearances
- 1934; 1938; 1946; 1950; 1954; 1958; 1962; 1966; 1969; 1971; 1974; 1978; 1982; 1986; 1990; 1994; 1998; 2002; 2006; 2010; 2012; 2014; 2016; 2018; 2022; 2024

Romania competed at the 2018 European Athletics Championships in Berlin, Germany, from 6–12 August 2018. A delegation of 36 athletes were sent to represent the country.

== Results ==
Men
Track and road

Athletes	Event	Heats		Semifinal		Final	
Athletes	Event	Result	Rank	Result	Rank	Result	Rank
Ioan Andrei Melnicescu	100 metres	10.88	39	did not advance			
Ionut Andrei Neagoe	100 metres	10.56	32	did not advance			
Ionut Andrei Neagoe	200 metres	21.21	23	did not advance			
Alexandru Terpezan	200 metres	21.39	29	did not advance			
Robert Parge	400 metres	45.99	11 Q	46.07	23	did not advance	
Cosmin Trofin	800 metres	1:48.85	27	did not advance			
Nicolae Alexandru Soare	10,000 metres	—				29:13.82	19
Costin Florian Homiuc; Ioan Andrei Melnicescu; Ionut Andrei Neagoe; Petre Rezmives; Alexandru Terpezan	4 × 100 metres relay	39.63	12	—		did not advance	
Vlad Dulcescu; David-Iustin Nastase; Robert Parge; Cristian Radu; Cosmin Trofin	4 × 400 metres relay	3:10.08	14	—		did not advance	
Florin Alin Stirbu	20 km walk	—				Disqualified	
Narcis Mihaila	50 km walk	—				did not finish	
Florin Alin Stirbu	50 km walk	—				did not finish	

Field events

Athletes	Event	Qualification		Final	
Athletes	Event	Distance	Position	Distance	Position
Cristian Staicu	Long jump	7.52	22	did not advance	
Marian Oprea	Triple jump	15.93	21	did not advance	
Andrei Gag	Shot put	19.26	23	did not advance	
Alin Firfirică	Discus throw	64.79	3 Q	63.73	7
Alexandru Novac	Javelin throw	76.44	17	did not advance	

Women
Track and road

Athletes	Event	Heats		Semifinal		Final	
Athletes	Event	Result	Rank	Result	Rank	Result	Rank
Andrea Miklos	400 metres	52.40	13 q	52.49	23	did not advance	
Bianca Răzor	400 metres	52.19 SB	9 q	52.27	20	did not advance	
Claudia Bobocea	1500 metres	4:16.20	22	—		did not advance	
Ancuta Bobocel	5000 metres	—				15:16.13 PB	7
Roxana Bârca	10,000 metres	—				33:17.61	12
Ancuta Bobocel	10,000 metres	—				did not finish	
Paula Todoran	Marathon	—				2:47:58	42
Anamaria Nesteriuc	100 metres hurdles	13.16	7 q	13.26	22	did not advance	
Sanda Belgyan	400 metres hurdles	56.68 PB	5 Q	57.51	22	did not advance	
Cristina Daniela Balan; Sanda Belgyan; Camelia Florina Gal; Andrea Miklos; Anamaria Nesteriuc; Bianca Răzor	4 × 400 metres relay	3:31.95 SB	7 q	—		3:32.15	7
Andreea Arsine	20 km walk	—				1:43:21	26
Ana Veronica Rodean	20 km walk	—				1:33:39 PB	19

Field events

Athletes	Event	Qualification		Final	
Athletes	Event	Distance	Position	Distance	Position
Daniela Stanciu	High jump	1.81	18	did not advance	
Florentina Costina Iusco	Long jump	6.17	25	did not advance	
Angela Moroșanu	Long jump	6.55 SB	14	did not advance	
Alina Rotaru	Long jump	6.55	15	did not advance	
Elena Andreea Panturoiu	Triple jump	14.20	9 Q	14.38	4
Bianca Ghelber	Hammer throw	66.17	19	did not advance	
