= Romania at the 2022 European Athletics Championships =

- Flag of Romania
- WA code: ROU
- National federation: Romanian Athletics Federation

in Munich, Germany 15 August 2022 – 21 August 2022
- Competitors: 21 (12 men and 9 women) in 16 events
- Medals Ranked 19th: Gold 1 Silver 0 Bronze 0 Total 1

European Athletics Championships appearances
- 1934; 1938; 1946; 1950; 1954; 1958; 1962; 1966; 1969; 1971; 1974; 1978; 1982; 1986; 1990; 1994; 1998; 2002; 2006; 2010; 2012; 2014; 2016; 2018; 2022; 2024

Romania competed at the 2022 European Athletics Championships in Munich, Germany, between 15 and 21 August 2022

== Medallists ==
Medal	Name	Event	Date
Gold	Bianca Ghelber	Women's hammer throw	17 August

== Results ==
Romania entered the following athletes.

Key

- Q = Qualified for the next round
- q = Qualified for the next round as a fastest loser or, in field events, by position without achieving the qualifying target
- NR = National record
- PB = Personal best
- SB = Season best
- N/A = Round not applicable for the event

=== Men ===
Track and road events

Athlete	Event	Heat		Semifinal		Final	
Athlete	Event	Result	Rank	Result	Rank	Result	Rank
Mihai Sorin Dringo	400 m	Bye		47.06	22	Did not advance	
Alin Ionuţ Anton	110 m hurdles	14.18	23	Did not advance			
Ilie Corneschi	Marathon	—				2:18:59	38
Narcis Mihăilă	35 km walk	—				2:45:03	16
Marius Cocioran	35 km walk	—				DNF	

Field events

Athlete	Event	Qualification		Final	
Athlete	Event	Distance	Position	Distance	Position
Gabriel Bitan	Long jump	7.64	16	Did not advance	
Valentin Toboc	Long jump	NM		Did not advance	
Răzvan Cristian Grecu	Triple jump	16.44	9 q	NM	
Andrei Toader	Shot put	20.50	6 q	19.15	12
Alin Firfirică	Dscus throw	64.17	6 q	64.35	7
Alexandru Novac	Javelin throw	77.68	7 q	75.78	9
Denis Adrian Both	Javelin throw	74.62	18	Did not advance	

=== Women ===
Track and road events

Athlete	Event	Heat		Semifinal		Final	
Athlete	Event	Result	Rank	Result	Rank	Result	Rank
Claudia Bobocea	1500 m	4:03.63	4 Q	—		4:07.74	11
Claudia Prisecaru	3000 m steeplechase	9:43.51	10 Q	—		9:35.17	6
Mihaela Acatrinei	35 km walk	—				DNF	
Ana Veronica Rodean	35 km walk	—				DNF	

Field events

Athlete	Event	Qualification		Final	
Athlete	Event	Distance	Position	Distance	Position
Daniela Stanciu	High jump	1.83	14	Did not advance	
Alina Rotaru	Long jump	6.58	8 q	6.26	11
Florentina Iusco	Long jump	NM		Did not advance	
Elena Panțuroiu	Triple jump	14.00 SB	7 q	14.01 SB	8
Bianca Ghelber	Hammer throw	71.27	3 q	72.72	1st place, gold medalist(s)
