= Matea Parlov Koštro =

Croatian long-distance runner

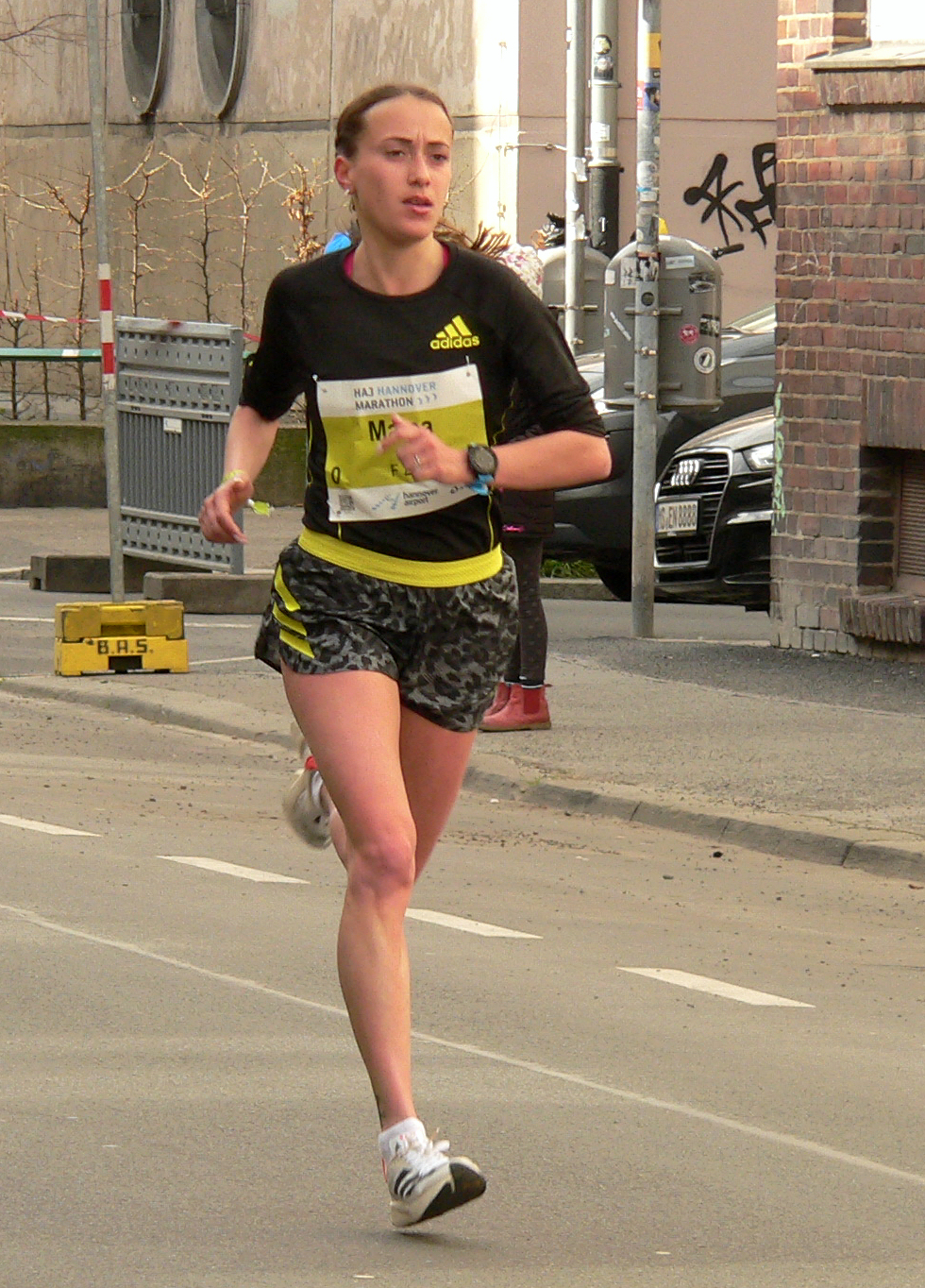
- Parlov-Koštro at 2022 Hannover Marathon

Personal information
- Born: 2 June 1992 (age 34)

Sport
- Country: Croatia
- Sport: Long-distance running
Medal record
Women's athletics
Representing Croatia
European Championships
Silver medal – second place	2022 Munich	Marathon
Mediterranean Games
Bronze medal – third place	2026 Taranto	Half marathon

Matea Parlov Koštro (born 2 June 1992) is a Croatian long-distance runner. She competed in the women's marathon at the 2019 World Athletics Championships held in Doha, Qatar. She did not finish her race. She finished 21st in the women's marathon at the 2020 Summer Olympics held in Tokyo, Japan.
