= 2022 European Athletics Championships – Women's marathon =

Women's marathon at the 2022 European Athletics Championships
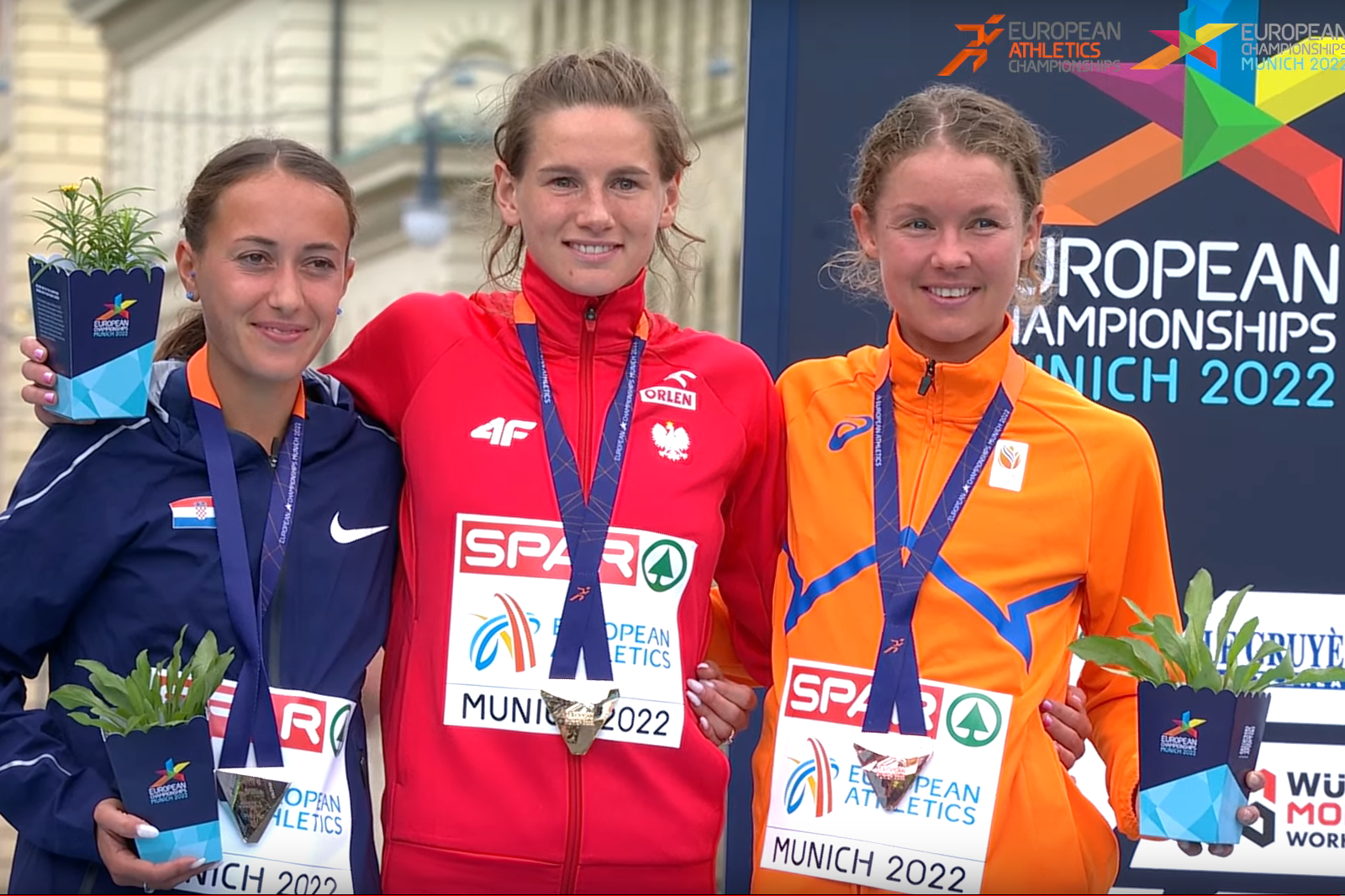
- The medal ceremony of the event.
- Location: Munich
- Dates: August 15
- Competitors: 63 from 23 nations
- Winning result: 2:28:36

Medalists
gold medal	Aleksandra Lisowska	Poland
silver medal	Matea Parlov Koštro	Croatia
bronze medal	Nienke Brinkman	Netherlands

The women's marathon at the 2022 European Athletics Championships took place at the streets of Munich on 15 August.

== Records ==
Standing records prior to the 2022 European Athletics Championships
World record	Mary Jepkosgei Keitany (KEN)	2:17:01	London, Great Britain	23 April 2017
European record	Paula Radcliffe (GBR)	2:15:25	London, Great Britain	13 April 2003
Championship record	Christelle Daunay (FRA)	2:25:14	Zürich, Switzerland	16 August 2014
World Leading	Brigid Kosgei (KEN)	2:16:02	Tokyo, Japan	6 March 2022
Europe Leading	Joan Chelimo (ROU)	2:18:04	Seoul, South Korea	17 April 2022

== Schedule ==
Date	Time	Round
15 August 2022	10:30	Final

All times are local times (UTC+2)

== Results ==
The race was started on 10:30.

Rank	Name	Nationality	Time	Note
1st place, gold medalist(s)	Aleksandra Lisowska	Poland	2:28:36	SB
2nd place, silver medalist(s)	Matea Parlov Koštro	Croatia	2:28:42	
3rd place, bronze medalist(s)	Nienke Brinkman	Netherlands	2:28:52	
4	Miriam Dattke	Germany	2:28:52	
5	Giovanna Epis	Italy	2:29:06	SB
6	Domenika Mayer	Germany	2:29:21	
7	Fionnuala McCormack	Ireland	2:29:25	SB
8	Hanne Verbruggen	Belgium	2:29:44	SB
9	Fabienne Schlumpf	Switzerland	2:30:17	NR
10	Deborah Schöneborn	Germany	2:30:35	
11	Marta Galimany	Spain	2:31:14	
12	Rabea Schöneborn	Germany	2:31:36	
13	Mieke Gorissen	Belgium	2:31:48	
14	Melody Julien	France	2:32:19	
15	Katharina Steinruck	Germany	2:32:41	SB
16	Irene Pelayo	Spain	2:33:15	SB
17	Nóra Szabó	Hungary	2:34:49	SB
18	Elena Loyo	Spain	2:34:56	SB
19	Angelika Mach	Poland	2:35:03	SB
20	Kristina Hendel	Germany	2:35:14	
21	Jill Holterman	Netherlands	2:35:25	SB
22	Alice Wright	Great Britain	2:35:33	
23	Tereza Hrochová	Czech Republic	2:36.00	
24	Marcela Joglová	Czech Republic	2:36:26	SB
25	Naomi Mitchell	Great Britain	2:36:44	
26	Monika Jackiewicz	Poland	2:37:15	
27	Tetyana Hamera	Ukraine	2:37:28	SB
28	Maor Tiyouri	Israel	2:38:04	
29	Ann Marie McGlynn	Ireland	2:38:26	SB
30	Hanna Lindholm	Sweden	2:38:44	
31	Becky Briggs	Great Britain	2:39:02	
32	Laura Méndez Esquer	Spain	2:39:15	SB
33	Astrid Verhoeven	Belgium	2:40:03	
34	Aoife Cooke	Ireland	2:40:37	SB
35	Rosie Edwards	Great Britain	2:40:47	SB
36	Maria Sagnes Wågan	Norway	2:40:58	SB
37	Runa Skrove Falch	Norway	2:41:08	
38	Loreta Kančytė	Lithuania	2:41:15	SB
39	Nina Chydenius	Finland	2:43:00	
40	Moira Stewartová	Czech Republic	2:43:03	SB
41	Sanna Mustonen	Sweden	2:43:23	SB
42	Anna Incerti	Italy	2:44:11	
43	Karen Ehrenreich	Denmark	2:44:28	
44	Camilla Elofsson	Sweden	2:45:34	
45	Marinela Nineva	Bulgaria	2:45:40	SB
46	Suvi Miettinen	Finland	2:47:15	SB
47	Lilia Fisikovici	Moldova	2:47:44	
48	Zsófia Erdélyi	Hungary	2:48:03	
49	Annemari Kiekara	Finland	2:48:30	
50	Susana Cunha	Portugal	2:51:14	
51	Marina Nemchenko	Ukraine	2:53:13	SB
52	Bo Ummels	Netherlands	3:00:56	SB
	Militsa Mircheva	Bulgaria	Did not finish	
	Yevheniya Prokofyeva	Ukraine	Did not finish	
	Ana Štefulj	Croatia	Did not finish	
	Alisa Vainio	Finland	Did not finish	
	Izabela Paszkiewicz	Poland	Did not finish	
	Viktoriia Kaliuzhna	Ukraine	Did not finish	
	Sara Moreira	Portugal	Did not finish	
	Ruth van der Meijden	Netherlands	Did not finish	
	Solange Jesús	Portugal	Did not finish	
	Pernille Eugenie Epland	Norway	Did not finish	
	Katarzyna Jankowska	Poland	Did not finish	
