= Athletics at the 2017 European Youth Summer Olympic Festival =

- Venue: Radnóti street Sport Centre
- Dates: July 25 - July 29

The athletics competition at the 2017 European Youth Summer Olympic Festival was held at the Radnóti street Sport Centre in Győr, Hungary between 25 July and 29 July. A total of 36 events were contested, evenly divided between the sexes, repeating the programme of the previous edition.

== Medal summary ==
=== Boys ===
Event	Gold		Silver		Bronze	
100 m	Aurélien Larue; France	10.61	Stephan Skogheim Kyeremeh; Norway	10.68	Enrico Sancin; Italy	10.69
200 m	Aurélien Larue; France	21.64	Stephan Skogheim Kyeremeh; Norway	21.66	Mitja Kordež; Slovenia	21.76
400 m	Ludovic Ouceni; France	48.84	Denys Baranov; Ukraine	49.33	Erik Sluga; Croatia	50.31
800 m	Djoao Lobles; Netherlands	1:50.72	Cristian Voicu; Romania	1:51.43	Jakub Davidík; Czech Republic	1:51.53
1500 m	Mehmet Çelik; Turkey	4:06.33	Bence Apáti; Hungary	4:06.52	Andrej Paulíny; Slovakia	4:06.57
3000 m	Ömer Amaçtan; Turkey	8:35.32	Lars Agnar Hjelmeset; Norway	8:37.59	Robert Gorzynski; Poland	8:38.09
110 metres hurdles	Sven Jansons; Netherlands	13.87	Giuseppe Filpi; Italy	14.21	Eero Hirvinen; Finland	14.29
400 metres hurdles	Sven Roosen; Netherlands	53.71	Johan Claeson; Sweden	53.88	Leo Köhldorfer; Austria	53.92
2000 m steeplechase	Etson Mendes Barros; Portugal	5:58.24	Axel Fournival; France	6:02.05	Eemil Helander; Finland	6:03.63
4 × 100 m relay	Belgium; Arthur Gabor Pinter; Wolf Belien; Daniel Segers; Kwinten Torfs	41.75	Norway; Markus Rooth; Stephan Skogheim Kyeremeh; Andreas Haara Bakketun; Pål Haugen Lillefosse	41.79	Finland; Topias Laine; Lauri Kaukonen; Severi Mäntylä; Eero Hirvinen	42.39
High jump	Arttu Mattila; Finland	2.08 m	Mohammed-Ali Benlahbib; France	2.08 m	Carl af Forselles; Sweden	2.05 m
Pole vault	Pål Haugen Lillefosse; Norway	5.00 m	Marcus Kytölä; Finland	4.95 m	Ivan De Angelis; Italy	4.90 m
Long jump	Daniel Segers; Belgium	7.41 m	Ken-Mark Minkovski; Estonia	6.93 m	Henrik Flåtnes; Norway	6.89 m
Triple jump	Batuhan Çakır; Turkey	14.94 m	Siarhei Dziambitski; Belarus	14.77 m	Davide Favro; Italy	14.51 m
Shot put (5 kg)	Piotr Goździewicz; Poland	19.41 m	Carmelo Musci; Italy	19.35 m	Miguel Gómez Díaz; Spain	17.52 m
Discus (1.5 kg)	Oleksiy Kyrylin; Ukraine	60.74 m	Fabian Weinberg; Norway	56.45 m	Carmelo Musci; Italy	55.77 m
Hammer throw (5 kg)	Myhaylo Kokhan; Ukraine	78.28 m	Artur Maskalenka; Belarus	71.36 m	Valentin Andreev; Bulgaria	69.60 m
Javelin (700 g)	Topias Laine; Finland	74.74 m	Metehan Acar; Turkey	69.88 m	Raman Hmyrak; Belarus	64.54 m

=== Girls ===
Event	Gold		Silver		Bronze	
100 metres	Minke Bisschops; Netherlands	11.52	Boglárka Takács; Hungary	11.58	Patience Jumbo-Gula; Ireland	11.59
200 metres	Zoë Sedney; Netherlands	23.74	Rhasidat Adeleke; Ireland	23.81	Gémima Joseph; France	23.89
400 metres	Andrea Jiménez; Spain	53.55	Barbora Malíková; Czech Republic	54.07	Janka Molnar; Hungary	55.00
800 metres	Zuzanna Bronowska; Poland	2:08.07	Gaël de Coninck; Sweden	2:09.14	Andreea Hojda; Romania	2:10.54
1500 metres	Sarah Healy; Ireland	4:19.85	Klaudia Kazimierska; Poland	4:23.17	Anna Baumgartner; Austria	4:23.28
3000 metres	Alessia Zarbo; France	09:33.12	Inci Kalkan; Turkey	09:37.91	Anna Hightower; Netherlands	09:45.37
100 metres hurdles	Zoë Sedney; Netherlands	13.37	Martine Hjørnevik; Norway	13.57	Amelie Braun; Germany	13.65
400 metres hurdles	Carla García Sánchez; Spain	1:00.06	Maren Smoljuk; Germany	1:00.59	Lena Wernli; Switzerland	1:01.23
2000 metres steeplechase	Karolina Horváth; Hungary	6:51.04	Claire Palou; France	6:55.77	Assia El Maazi; Italy	7:00.22
4 × 100 m relay	Belgium; Lotte Van Lent; Lotte Van der Vreken; Ilona Masson; Lieselotte Van Laere	46.01	Netherlands; Zoë Sedney; Minke Bisschops; Anna Roelofs; Suzanne Libbers	46.05	Ireland; Niamh Foley; Rhasidat Adeleke; Miriam Daly; Patience Jumbo-Gula	46.38
High jump	Yaroslava Mahuchikh; Ukraine	1.89 m CR	Elena Kulichenko; Russia	1.87 m	Jessica Kähärä; Finland	1.80 m
Pole vault	Victoria Kalitta; Poland	3.80 m	Floriane Ponza; France	3.80 m	Alva Sundin; Sweden	3.80 m
Long jump	Ingeborg Gruenwald; Austria	6.23 m	Olaia Gisela Becerril; Spain	6.15 m	Tilde Johansson; Sweden	6.10 m
Triple jump	María Vicente; Spain	13.72 m	Gaëlle Maonzambi; Switzerland	12.87 m	Jessica Kähärä; Finland	12.85 m
Shot put (3 kg)	Alida van Daalen; Netherlands	16.23 m	Josene Klisch; Germany	15.85 m	Karyna Yehinian; Belarus	15.77 m
Discus throw (1 kg)	Diletta Fortuna; Italy	50.23 m	Alida van Daalen; Netherlands	48.82 m	Violetta Ignateva; Russia	48.34 m
Hammer throw (3 kg)	Julia Kivinen; Finland	64.22 m	Valeriya Ivanenko; Ukraine	61.64 m	Jade Williams; Ireland	58.62 m
Javelin throw (500 g)	Julia Valtanen; Finland	58.11 m	Münevver Hancı; Turkey	55.25 m	Kaja Morch Pettersen; Norway	52.77 m
