= 2021 European Athletics U23 Championships – Men's 4 × 400 metres relay =

Men's 4 × 400 metres relay at the 2021 European Athletics U23 Championships
- Venue: Kadriorg Stadium, Tallinn
- Dates: 11 July
- Competitors: 79 from 18 nations
- Winning time: 3:05.01

Medalists
gold medal	El-Mir Reale; Téo Andant; David Sombé; Ludovic Oucéni; Eddy Leech*	France
silver medal	Alessandro Moscardi; Edoardo Scotti; Riccardo Meli; Alessandro Sibilio; Leonardo Puca*	Italy
bronze medal	Johannes Nortmeyer; Kevin Joite; Ben Zapka; Emil Agyekum; Arne Leppelsack*	Germany

The men's 4 × 400 metres relay event at the 2021 European Athletics U23 Championships was held in Tallinn, Estonia, at Kadriorg Stadium on 11 July.

== Records ==
Prior to the competition, the records were as follows:

European U23 record	Russia (RUS)	3:02.13	Debrecen, Hungary	15 July 2007
Championship U23 record	Russia (RUS)	3:02.13	Debrecen, Hungary	15 July 2007

== Results ==
=== Round 1 ===
Qualification rule: First 2 in each heat (Q) and the next 2 fastest (q) advance to the Final.

Rank	Heat	Nation	Athletes	Time	Notes
1	2	Great Britain	Lewis Davey, Ethan Brown, Aidan Leeson, Alex Haydock-Wilson	3:05.42	Q, EU23L
2	2	France	El-Mir Reale, Téo Andant, David Sombé, Eddy Leech	3:05.73	Q
3	3	Netherlands	Pim van Bakel, Netanel Dorothea, Ludo Van Nieuwenhuizen, Ramsey Angela	3:06.09	Q
4	1	Switzerland	Julien Bonvin, Filippo Moggi, Sales Inglin, Lionel Spitz	3:06.13	Q
5	1	Italy	Alessandro Moscardi, Riccardo Meli, Leonardo Puca, Edoardo Scotti	3:06.44	Q
6	1	Slovenia	Jure Grkman, Filip Jakob Demšar, Gregor Grahovac, Lovro Mesec Košir	3:06.65	q, NU23R
7	1	Germany	Johannes Nortmeyer, Kevin Joite, Ben Zapka, Arne Leppelsack	3:06.87	q
8	1	Ukraine	Nikita Rodchenkov, Yaroslav Demchenko, Mykyta Barabanov, Oleksandr Pohorilko	3:07.87	
9	3	Turkey	Oğuzhan Kaya, Kubilay Ençu, Akın Özyürek, İlyas Çanakçı	3:08.69	Q, NU23R
10	2	Spain	Javier Sánchez, Iker Alfonso de Miguel, Jesús David Delgado, Bernat Erta	3:09.14	
11	2	Czech Republic	Jakub Majercák, Matěj Krsek, Ladislav Topfer, Daniel Lehár	3:09.79	
12	1	Sweden	Vidar Stenqvist, Gustav Gahne, Carl Bengtström, Rasmus Hugosson	3:10.25	
13	2	Ireland	Cathal Crosbie, Jack Mitchell, Eoin Kenny, Shane Monagle	3:11.22	
14	2	Belarus	Uladzimir Zhadzka, Kiryl Staravoitau, Kiryl Karachun, Uladzislau Aliaksandrau	3:12.19	
15	3	Greece	Spiridon Doukatelis, Georgios Lampropoulos, Ierotheos Dritsas, Ioannis Ntetsikas	3:12.30	
16	3	Romania	Darius Marian Făgăraș, Sorin-Florin Ionescu, Mihai Sorin Dringo, Mihai Cristian Pislaru	3:12.96	
17	3	Estonia	Karl-Oskar Pajus, Kaido Kossas, Jakob Keller, Märt Riso	3:18.45	
	3	Slovakia	Mário Hanic, Lukáš Glodžák, Patrik Dӧmӧtӧr, Oliver Murcko	DQ	TR17.3.1

=== Final ===
Rank	Nation	Athletes	Time	Notes
1st place, gold medalist(s)	France	El-Mir Reale, Téo Andant, David Sombé, Ludovic Oucéni	3:05.01	EU23L
2nd place, silver medalist(s)	Italy	Alessandro Moscardi, Edoardo Scotti, Riccardo Meli, Alessandro Sibilio	3:06.07	
3rd place, bronze medalist(s)	Germany	Johannes Nortmeyer, Kevin Joite, Ben Zapka, Emil Agyekum	3:06.42	
4	Turkey	Oğuzhan Kaya, Kubilay Ençu, Akın Özyürek, İlyas Çanakçı	3:06.57	NU23R
5	Slovenia	Jure Grkman, Gregor Grahovac, Lovro Mesec Košir, Jan Vuković	3:07.22	
6	Great Britain	Lewis Davey, Alex Haydock-Wilson, Aidan Leeson, Alastair Chalmers	3:09.28	
	Switzerland	Julien Bonvin, Ricky Petrucciani, Filippo Moggi, Lionel Spitz	DNF	
	Netherlands	Pim van Bakel, Netanel Dorothea, Djoao Lobles, Ramsey Angela	DQ	TR17.2.2
