= 2021 European Athletics U23 Championships – Men's 400 metres =

Men's 400 metres at the 2021 European Athletics U23 Championships
- Venue: Kadriorg Stadium, Tallinn
- Dates: 8–10 July
- Competitors: 33 from 20 nations
- Winning time: 45.02

Medalists
gold medal	Ricky Petrucciani	Switzerland
silver medal	Jonathan Sacoor	Belgium
bronze medal	Edoardo Scotti	Italy

The men's 400 metres event at the 2021 European Athletics U23 Championships was held in Tallinn, Estonia, at Kadriorg Stadium on 8, 9 and 10 July.

== Records ==
Prior to the competition, the records were as follows:

European U23 record	Thomas Schönlebe (GDR)	44.33	Rome, Italy	3 September 1987
Championship U23 record	Leslie Djhone (FRA)	45.04	Bydgoszcz, Poland	19 July 2003

== Results ==
=== Round 1 ===
Qualification rule: First 4 in each heat (Q) and the next 4 fastest (q) advance to the Semi-Finals.

Rank	Heat	Name	Nationality	Time	Notes
1	2	Ricky Petrucciani	Switzerland	45.95	Q
2	5	Mihai Sorin Dringo	Romania	46.30	Q
3	4	Jonathan Sacoor	Belgium	46.34	Q
4	2	Edoardo Scotti	Italy	46.41	Q
5	4	Mihai Cristian Pislaru	Romania	46.42	Q
6	3	Oleksandr Pohorilko	Ukraine	46.45	Q
7	1	Ericsson Tavares	Portugal	46.61	Q, PB
8	2	Ludovic Oucéni	France	46.62	Q
9	1	Javier Sánchez	Spain	46.70	Q
10	1	Alex Haydock-Wilson	Great Britain	46.70	Q
11	1	Boško Kijanović	Serbia	46.72	Q, SB
12	5	Bernat Erta	Spain	46.81	Q
13	3	João Coelho	Portugal	46.85	Q
14	4	Netanel Dorothea	Netherlands	46.91	Q
15	2	Oliver Murcko	Slovakia	46.93	Q
16	3	Lionel Spitz	Switzerland	46.96	Q
17	4	Lovro Mesec Košir	Slovenia	47.00	Q, SB
18	5	Matěj Krsek	Czech Republic	47.15	Q
19	5	Riccardo Meli	Italy	47.22	Q
20	1	Gregor Grahovac	Slovenia	47.33	q
21	5	Ioannis Ntetsikas	Greece	47.36	q, PB
22	3	Jure Grkman	Slovenia	47.37	Q
23	3	Matteo Raimondi	Italy	47.44	q
23	4	Iļja Petrušenko	Latvia	47.44	q
25	5	Mykyta Barabanov	Ukraine	47.58	
26	3	Daniel Lehár	Czech Republic	47.70	
27	2	Jakub Majercák	Czech Republic	47.72	
28	1	Andreas Haara Bakketun	Norway	47.90	
29	2	Yaroslav Demchenko	Ukraine	47.95	
30	4	Filippo Moggi	Switzerland	48.02	
31	5	Karl-Oskar Pajus	Estonia	49.19	
32	3	Senad Ramadani	North Macedonia	51.82	
	2	Jack Raftery	Ireland	DNF	

=== Semifinals ===
Qualification rule: First 2 in each heat (Q) and the next 2 fastest (q) advance to the Final.

Rank	Heat	Name	Nationality	Time	Notes
1	1	Ricky Petrucciani	Switzerland	45.72	Q
2	3	Jonathan Sacoor	Belgium	45.77	Q, SB
3	3	Edoardo Scotti	Italy	45.84	Q
4	1	Mihai Cristian Pislaru	Romania	45.89	Q, =PB
5	3	Bernat Erta	Spain	46.00	q
6	3	Oleksandr Pohorilko	Ukraine	46.04	q, PB
7	2	Mihai Sorin Dringo	Romania	46.16	Q
8	2	Ludovic Oucéni	France	46.23	Q
9	1	João Coelho	Portugal	46.29	PB
10	1	Alex Haydock-Wilson	Great Britain	46.40	
11	3	Boško Kijanović	Serbia	46.47	PB
12	1	Netanel Dorothea	Netherlands	46.61	
13	2	Ericsson Tavares	Portugal	46.62	
14	2	Oliver Murcko	Slovakia	46.65	SB
15	2	Javier Sánchez	Spain	46.71	
16	2	Lionel Spitz	Switzerland	46.90	
17	1	Lovro Mesec Košir	Slovenia	46.99	SB
18	1	Iļja Petrušenko	Latvia	47.17	PB
19	3	Matěj Krsek	Czech Republic	47.18	
20	3	Gregor Grahovac	Slovenia	47.24	
21	2	Jure Grkman	Slovenia	47.27	
22	3	Ioannis Ntetsikas	Greece	47.53	
23	1	Riccardo Meli	Italy	47.83	
	2	Matteo Raimondi	Italy	DNS	

=== Final ===
Rank	Lane	Name	Nationality	Time	Notes
1st place, gold medalist(s)	6	Ricky Petrucciani	Switzerland	45.02	CR
2nd place, silver medalist(s)	3	Jonathan Sacoor	Belgium	45.17	SB
3rd place, bronze medalist(s)	5	Edoardo Scotti	Italy	45.68	SB
4	1	Oleksandr Pohorilko	Ukraine	45.87	PB
5	4	Mihai Sorin Dringo	Romania	45.93	PB
6	8	Ludovic Oucéni	France	45.93	PB
7	2	Bernat Erta	Spain	46.01	
8	7	Mihai Cristian Pislaru	Romania	46.67	
