= 2021 Dutch Athletics Championships =

- Dates: 24–27 June 2021
- Host city: Breda, Netherlands
- Venue: Sportcomplex Dr Schaepmanlaan

The 2021 Dutch Athletics Championships was the national championship in outdoor track and field for the Netherlands. It was held 24–27 June 2021 at the Sportcomplex Dr Schaepmanlaan in Breda. It was organised by local organisation AV Sprint. The competition was carried out without an audience for a second year running due to the COVID-19 pandemic, though coaches of participating athletes were allowed. The 10,000 metres races were held separately at the Golden Spike Leiden meet on 12 June.

== Results ==
=== Men ===
Event	Gold		Silver		Bronze	
100 metres Wind: +0.7 m/s	Chris Garia	10.37	Solomon Bockarie	10.43	Hensley Paulina	10.46
200 metres Wind: +0.3 m/s	Churandy Martina	20.76	Taymir Burnet	20.82	Onyema Adigida	20.91
400 metres	Liemarvin Bonevacia	44.99	Jochem Dobber	45.07	Nout Wardenburg	45.61
800 metres	Maarten Plaum	1:51.64	Jurgen Wielart	1:51.81	Djoao Lobles	1:52.04
1500 metres	Richard Douma	3:37.81	Valentijn Weinans	3:38.11	Bram Anderiessen	3:38.29
5000 metres	Mike Foppen	13:31.09	Filmon Tesfu	13:55.32	Yorben Ruiter	13:56.93
10,000 metres	Benjamin de Haan	28:31.14	Frank Futselaar	28:45.30	Yorben Ruiter	28:51.62
110 m hurdles Wind: +0.1 m/s	Koen Smet	13.59	Liam van der Schaaf	13.79	Dave Wesselink	14.55
400 m hurdles	Ramsey Angela	49.44	Nick Smidt	49.63	Martin Meijer	52.59
3000 m s'chase	Simon Grannetia	9:02.91	Thom Reynders	9:08.95	Mart Ruben Nijhuis	9:10.01
Long jump	Baboucar Sallah Mohammed	7.52 m (+0.9 m/s)	Sven Jansons	7.45 m (-1.2 m/s)	Damian Felter	7.39 m (+0.3 m/s)
Triple jump	Baboucar Sallah Mohammed	15.36 m (-0.6 m/s)	Winjaris Windster	14.64 m (+1.7 m/s)	Favour Abu	14.43 m (+0.9 m/s)
High jump	Douwe Amels	2.21 m	Stan NIjhuis	2.09 m	Marius Wouters	2.06 m
Pole vault	Rutger Koppelaar	5.70 m	Menno Vloon	5.40 m	Koen van der Wijst	5.25 m
Shot put	Sven Poelmann	19.64 m	Mattijs Mols	17.88 m	Bjorn van Kins	16.62 m
Discus throw	Ruben Rolvink	59.18 m	Stephan Dekker	54.63 m	Sebastiaan Bonte	52.03 m
Javelin throw	Mart ten Berge	74.25 m	Dario Podda	73.83 m	Tom Egbers	71.95 m
Hammer throw	Dennis Hemelaar	64.39 m	Etiènne Orbons	61.55 m	Joris Pals	56.27 m
Decathlon	Rik Taam	8107 pts	Lauri Hulleman	7500 pts	Trystan de Weerdt	6555 pts

=== Women ===
Event	Gold		Silver		Bronze	
100 metres Wind: +1.2 m/s	Dafne Schippers	11.20	Marije van Hunenstijn	11.28	Jamile Samuel	11.34
200 metres Wind: +0.5 m/s	Jamile Samuel	22.93	Lieke Klaver	23.04	Tasa Jiya	23.14
400 metres	Lisanne de Witte	52.08	Laura de Witte	53.38	Hanneke Oosterwegel	53.44
800 metres	Bregje Sloot	2:07.85	Suzanne Voorrips	2:08.24	Marissa Damink	2:08.34
1500 metres	Britt Ummels	4:13.32	Diane van Es	4:15.53	Marissa Damink	4:18.12
5000 metres	Bo Ummels	16:11.19	Ineke van Koldam	16:20.37	Famke Heinst	16:21.65
10,000 metres	Tirza van der Wolf	34:31.46	Marcella Herzog	34:55.00	Renee Sijbesma	35:39.90
100 m hurdles Wind: +0.0 m/s	Sharona Bakker	13.13	Zoë Sedney	13.13	Maayke Tjin A-Lim	13.60
400 m hurdles	Cathelijn Peeters	58.17	Silke Peeters	58.29	Femke Frijters	59.58
3000 m s'chase	Irene van der Reijken	9:43.26	Lotte Krause	9:57.77	Veerle Bakker	9:59.94
Long jump	Anouk Vetter	6.28 m (-0.3 m/s)	Lianne van Krieken	6.26 m (+0.1 m/s)	Pauline Hondema	6.14 m (-0.1 m/s)
Triple jump	Maureen Herremans	12.98 m (-0.9 m/s)	Daniëlle Spek	12.88 m (+0.2 m/s)	Kellynsia Leerdam	12.67 m (+2.7 m/s)
High jump	Glenka Antonia	1.81 m	Sarah van Beilen	1.77 m	Sofie Dokter Britt Weerman	1.77 m
Pole vault	Femke Pluim	4.15 m	Karlijn Schouten	4.05 m	Kristina Tergau	3.70 m
Shot put	Jessica Schilder	18.77 m	Jorinde van Klinken	17.84 m	Benthe König	17.74 m
Discus throw	Jorinde van Klinken	64.28 m	Alida van Daalen	57.08 m	Corinne Nugter	52.27 m
Javelin throw	Lisanne Schol	53.92 m	Nadine Broersen	53.53 m	Danien ten Berge	52.76 m
Hammer throw	Judith Essemiah	61.97 m	Audrey Jacobs	61.18 m	Wendy Koolhaas	60.82 m
Heptathlon	Myke van de Wiel	5908 pts	Melissa de Haan	5795 pts	Michelle Oud	5753 pts
