= 2023 European Athletics U23 Championships – Women's long jump =

Women's long jump at the 2023 European Athletics U23 Championships
- Venue: Leppävaara Stadium
- Location: Espoo, Finland
- Dates: 15 July (qualification); 16 July (final)
- Competitors: 20 from 14 nations
- Winning distance: 6.93 m

Medalists
gold medal	Larissa Iapichino	Italy
silver medal	Maja Åskag	Sweden
bronze medal	Tessy Ebosele	Spain

The women's long jump event at the 2023 European Athletics U23 Championships was held in Espoo, Finland, at Leppävaara Stadium on 15 and 16 July.

== Records ==
Prior to the competition, the records were as follows:

European U23 record	Heike Drechsler (GDR)	7.45	Dresden, East Germany	3 July 1986
Championship U23 record	Darya Klishina (RUS)	7.05	Ostrava, Czech Republic	17 July 2011

== Results ==
=== Qualification ===
Qualification rules: All athletes over 6.50 m (Q) or at least 12 best (q) advanced to the final.

Rank	Group	Name	Nationality	#1	#2	#3	Mark	Notes
1	A	Larissa Iapichino	Italy	6.67			6.67	Q
2	A	Maja Åskag	Sweden	6.46	6.22	6.59	6.59	Q
3	A	Tiphaine Mauchant	France	6.59			6.59	Q
4	A	María Vicente	Spain	6.58w			6.58w	Q
5	B	Nikola Horowska	Poland	6.46w	6.34	r	6.46w	q
6	B	Tilde Johansson	Sweden	6.45	6.26	6.42	6.45	q
7	A	Ruby Millet	Ireland	5.95	6.42	x	6.42	q
8	A	Ronja Wengi	Switzerland	5.84	5.93	6.41w	6.41w	q
9	A	Ilse Steigenga	Netherlands	6.08	x	6.40	6.40	q
10	B	Mikaelle Assani	Germany	6.30	6.37	x	6.37	q
11	B	Tessy Ebosele	Spain	x	6.33w	6.01	6.33w	q
12	A	Lucie Kienast	Germany	x	6.27	6.06	6.27	q
13	B	Urša Matotek	Slovenia	6.23	6.02	x	6.23	
14	B	Evelyn Yankey	Spain	6.19w	6.12	x	6.19w	
15	A	Saga Vanninen	Finland	5.97	5.96	6.19w	6.19w	
16	A	Marija Bukvić	Serbia	6.17	x	5.97w	6.17	
17	B	Emilia Sjöstrand	Sweden	6.13	x	x	6.13	
18	A	Ida Beiter Bomme	Denmark	6.12	x	5.33	6.12	
19	A	Chiara Smeraldo	Italy	5.89	6.06	6.10	6.10	
20	A	Roksana Jędraszak	Poland	6.10	6.00	6.03	6.10	
21	A	Anna Matuszewicz	Poland	5.86w	6.09	5.83	6.09	
22	B	Kitija Paula Melnbārde	Latvia	6.09	x	x	6.09	
23	B	Klaudia Endrész	Hungary	6.08	x	5.80	6.08	
24	B	Pippi Lotta Enok	Estonia	x	6.06	6.01	6.06	
25	B	Arianna Battistella	Italy	5.89	5.83	6.03	6.03	
26	A	Gizem Akgöz	Turkey	5.99	5.92	5.98w	5.99	
27	B	Alina Listunova	Ukraine	5.84	5.82	5.94	5.94	
28	A	Ingeborg Grünwald	Austria	x	5.94	5.80	5.94	
29	B	Anna Rotter	Switzerland	5.91w	5.69	5.84	5.91w	
30	B	Sotiria Rapti	Greece	x	5.90	x	5.90	
31	B	Aleksandra Nacheva	Bulgaria	5.69w	r		5.69w	
32	B	Rachela Pace	Malta	x	5.63	5.68	5.68	
33	A	Monika Lehenová	Slovakia	5.63	x	5.64	5.64	
	B	Jessica Kähärä	Finland	x	x	x	NM	

=== Final ===
Rank	Name	Nationality	#1	#2	#3	#4	#5	#6	Result	Notes
1st place, gold medalist(s)	Larissa Iapichino	Italy	6.93	6.67	–	–	r		6.93	=EL
2nd place, silver medalist(s)	Maja Åskag	Sweden	6.41	6.63	6.43	6.58	6.59	6.73	6.73	
3rd place, bronze medalist(s)	Tessy Ebosele	Spain	6.28	6.57w	3.99	x	6.63	6.59	6.63	
4	María Vicente	Spain	6.44	6.56	x	6.54	x	x	6.56	
5	Tilde Johansson	Sweden	6.28	6.36	6.47	6.47	6.56	x	6.56	
6	Mikaelle Assani	Germany	6.49w	6.26	x	6.44	6.09	6.34	6.49w	
7	Tiphaine Mauchant	France	6.45	x	6.44	6.35	x	r	6.45	
8	Ronja Wengi	Switzerland	6.27	6.13	6.41	x	x	6.01	6.41	PB
9	Lucie Kienast	Germany	6.35	6.34	6.05				6.35	
10	Ilse Steigenga	Netherlands	6.11	6.19	x				6.19	
11	Ruby Millet	Ireland	6.09	x	x				6.09	
12	Nikola Horowska	Poland	4.00	r					4.00	
