= 2023 European Athletics U23 Championships – Women's triple jump =

Women's triple jump at the 2023 European Athletics U23 Championships
- Venue: Leppävaara Stadium
- Location: Espoo, Finland
- Dates: 13 July (qualification); 14 July (final)
- Competitors: 33 from 20 nations
- Winning distance: 14.21 m

Medalists
gold medal	María Vicente	Spain
silver medal	Maja Åskag	Sweden
bronze medal	Jessica Kähärä	Finland

The women's triple jump event at the 2023 European Athletics U23 Championships was held in Espoo, Finland, at Leppävaara Stadium on 13 and 14 July.

== Records ==
Prior to the competition, the records were as follows:

European U23 record	Anna Pyatykh (RUS)	14.79 m	Florence, Italy	21 June 2003
Championship U23 record	Cristina Nicolau (ROU)	14.70 m	Gothenburg, Sweden	1 August 1999

== Results ==
=== Qualification ===
Qualification rules: All athletes over 13.60 m (Q) or at least 12 best (q) will advance to the final.

Rank	Group	Name	Nationality	#1	#2	#3	Mark	Notes
1	B	Maja Åskag	Sweden	13.81			13.81	Q
2	A	María Vicente	Spain	13.26	13.60		13.60	Q
3	B	Aliena Juliette Heinzmann	Germany	13.18	13.37	–	13.37	q
4	A	Jessica Kähärä	Finland	13.28	13.32	–	13.32	q
5	A	Gizem Akgöz	Turkey	x	12.96	13.23	13.23	q
6	A	Veronica Zanon	Italy	13.09	13.21	x	13.21	q
7	B	Aleksandra Nacheva	Bulgaria	12.65	11.77	13.21	13.21	q
8	A	Caroline Joyeux	Germany	13.18	13.20	12.78	13.20	q
9	B	Anna Gräfin Keyserlingk	Germany	12.91	13.19	13.16	13.19	q
10	B	Ioana-Emilia Colibășanu	Romania	13.15	12.90	x	13.15	q
11	A	Linda Suchá	Czech Republic	12.82	13.02	x	13.02	q
12	B	Greta Brugnolo	Italy	12.99	12.51	12.93	12.99	q
13	A	Emilia Sjöstrand	Sweden	12.95	12.43	12.88	12.95	
14	B	Chiara Smeraldo	Italy	12.79	12.95	12.78	12.95	
15	B	Viktoriia Baranivska	Ukraine	12.95	12.75	12.63	12.95	
16	B	Rachel Ombeni	Norway	12.75	12.93	12.72	12.93	
17	A	Temi Ojora	Great Britain	x	12.57	12.93	12.93	
18	A	Daniela-Martine Wamokpego	France	12.60	12.91	12.74	12.91	
19	B	Ilona Ruohola	Finland	x	12.62	12.91	12.91	
20	B	Spyridoula Karydi	Greece	12.88	12.84	12.82	12.88	
21	A	Iuliana Dablia	Moldova	12.45	12.53	12.84	12.84	
22	B	Cerane Beal	France	12.61	12.76	12.74	12.76	
23	B	Hayriye Nur Arı	Turkey	12.56	12.66	x	12.66	
24	B	Rachela Pace	Malta	12.66	12.41	12.48	12.66	
25	A	Anna Kostenko	Ukraine	x	x	12.57	12.57	
26	A	Joanna Mosiek	Poland	12.55	12.49	12.40	12.55	
27	A	Hedda Kronstrand Kvalvåg	Norway	12.51	12.14	12.29	12.51	
28	A	Sotiria Rapti	Greece	12.36	12.49	12.46	12.49	
29	B	Eunice Ilunga Mbuyi	France	x	12.49	x	12.49	
30	B	Eliise Anijalg	Estonia	12.37	12.10	12.11	12.37	
31	A	Alexia Dospin	Romania	12.21	x	x	12.21	
32	A	Romi Tamir	Israel	x	12.02	x	12.02	
33	A	Viktória Áts	Hungary	11.79	x	x	11.79	

=== Final ===
Rank	Name	Nationality	#1	#2	#3	#4	#5	#6	Result	Notes
1st place, gold medalist(s)	María Vicente	Spain	x	14.21	13.57	14.19	x	14.15	14.21	=EU23L
2nd place, silver medalist(s)	Maja Åskag	Sweden	13.56	x	13.74	x	13.76	x	13.76	
3rd place, bronze medalist(s)	Jessica Kähärä	Finland	13.29	13.32	13.22	x	13.59	13.27	13.59	
4	Gizem Akgöz	Turkey	x	12.69	13.17	12.81	x	13.44	13.44	
5	Aleksandra Nacheva	Bulgaria	12.97	13.40	13.00	13.17	13.35	11.91	13.40	
6	Veronica Zanon	Italy	13.38	12.32	x	13.34	12.59	12.90	13.38	
7	Linda Suchá	Czech Republic	13.29	13.01	12.93	x	12.69	12.91	13.29	
8	Caroline Joyeux	Germany	12.78	x	13.24	13.20	13.16	x	13.24	
9	Aliena Juliette Heinzmann	Germany	13.14	12.78	12.81				13.14	
10	Anna Gräfin Keyserlingk	Germany	13.12	13.11	12.95				13.12	
11	Greta Brugnolo	Italy	12.70	x	12.33				12.70	
12	Ioana-Emilia Colibășanu	Romania	12.63	x	12.62				12.63	
