= 2018 European Athletics U18 Championships =

European athletics competition

2nd European Athletics Youth Championships
- Dates: 5–8 July 2018
- Host city: Győr, Hungary
- Venue: Olympic Sport Park
- Level: Youth
- Type: Outdoor
- Events: 40
- Participation: 1135 athletes from 50 nations

The 2018 European Athletics U18 Championships was the second edition of the biennial, continental athletics competition for European athletes aged fifteen to seventeen. It was held in Győr, Hungary from 5 to 8 July at the Olympic Sport Park.

== Medal summary ==
Legend

- WYB (World U18 Best), WYL (World U18 Leader), EYB (European U18 Best), EYL (European U18 Leader), CR (Championship Record), NYB (National U18 Record), PB (Personal Best), SB (Season Best)

=== Boys ===
==== Track ====
Event	Gold		Silver		Bronze	
100 metres	Raphael Bouju; Netherlands	10.64	Dominik Illovszky; Hungary	10.70	Pål Haugen Lillefosse; Norway	10.72
200 metres	Alexander Czysch; Germany	21.15 =CR	Daniel Regenfuß; Germany	21.19	Jiří Pechar; Czech Republic	21.31
400 metres	Lorenzo Benati; Italy	46.85 CR NYB	Ethan Brown; Great Britain	46.87 PB	Ludovic Oucéni; France	47.01 PB
800 metres	Max Burgin; Great Britain	1:47.36 CR	Eric Guzmán; Spain	1:49.19 PB	João Miguel Peixoto; Portugal	1:49.42 NYB
1500 metres	Kane Elliott; Great Britain	3:55.26 CR	Bence Apáti; Hungary	3:55.53	Andrej Paulíny; Slovakia	3:55.58 NYB
3000 metres	Thomas Keen; Great Britain	8:27.38	Ömer Amaçtan; Turkey	8:28.04 PB	Ryan Oosting; Netherlands	8:28.22 PB
110 metres hurdles	Sam Bennett; Great Britain	13.19 CR	Kenny Fletcher; France	13.49	Nick Rüegg; Switzerland	13.74
400 metres hurdles	Martin Fraysse; France Dániel Huller; Hungary	50.630 CR	Not awarded		Karl Johnson; Great Britain	50.90 NYB
2000 metres steeplechase	Baptiste Guyon; France	5:43.92 CR	Pol Oriach; Spain	5:46.81 PB	Etson Barros; Portugal	5:49.79 NYB
Medley relay	Italy; Federico Manini; Federico Guglielmi; Francesco Domenico Rossi; Lorenzo Benati; Luca Pierani*	1:53.01 EYL	Turkey; Konuralp Tiritoğlu; Kaan Gacar; Kubilay Ençu; İlyas Çanakçı; Tibet Sancak*	1:53.84	Poland; Rafał Łupiński; Adam Łukomski; Jakub Pająk; Mikołaj Kotyra; Szymon Szachniewicz*; Patryk Grzegorzewicz*	1:53.97
10,000 metres walk	Davide Finocchietti; Italy	45:01.33	Aldo Andrei; Italy	45:03.50	Özgür Topsakal; Turkey	45:09.22 PB

* Indicates the athlete only competed in the preliminary heats and received medals.

==== Field ====
Event	Gold		Silver		Bronze	
High jump	Dominic Ogbechie; Great Britain	2.16 =PB	Oleh Doroshchuk; Ukraine	2.13	Nikola Mujanović; Serbia	2.10
Pole vault	Pål Haugen Lillefosse; Norway	5.46 CR	Baptiste Thiery; France	5.30 PB	Eerik Haamer; Estonia	5.10 NYB
Long jump	Nick Schmahl; Germany	7.60	Davide Favro; Italy	7.29	Bryan Mucret; France	7.22
Triple jump	Batuhan Çakır; Turkey	15.62	Carl af Forselles; Sweden	15.36 PB	Rustam Məmmədov; Azerbaijan	15.16 PB
Shot put	Aliaksei Aleksandrovich; Belarus	20.97 NYB	Carmelo Musci; Italy	20.37 PB	Piotr Goździewicz; Poland	18.88
Discus throw	Yasiel Brayan Sotero; Spain	64.31 CR	Fabian Weinberg; Norway	58.84	Gracjan Kozak; Poland	57.76
Hammer throw	Myhaylo Kokhan; Ukraine	87.82 WYB	Valentin Andreev; Bulgaria	81.41 NYB	Tomasz Ratajczyk; Poland	76.01 PB
Javelin throw	Marek Mucha; Poland	80.01 CR	Gerasimos Kalogerakis; Greece	77.45 PB	Topias Laine; Finland	75.83 PB

==== Combined ====
Event	Gold		Silver		Bronze	
Decathlon	Aleksandr Komarov; Authorised Neutral Athletes	7703	Oļegs Kozjakovs; Latvia	7663	Sven Jansons; Netherlands	7604

=== Girls ===
==== Track ====
Event	Gold		Silver		Bronze	
100 metres	Guðbjörg Jóna Bjarnadóttir; Iceland	11.741	Pamera Losange; France Boglárka Takács; Hungary	11.747	Not awarded	
200 metres	Rhasidat Adeleke; Ireland	23.52 EYL	Gemima Joseph; France	23.60 NYB	Guðbjörg Jóna Bjarnadóttir; Iceland	23.73 NYB
400 metres	Barbora Malíková; Czech Republic	52.66 CR	Marie Scheppan; Germany	52.82 PB	Olesya Soldatova; Authorised Neutral Athletes	53.09 PB
800 metres	Keely Hodgkinson; Great Britain	2:04.84 CR	Sophie O'Sullivan; Ireland	2:06.05	Gaël de Coninck; Sweden	2:06.14
1500 metres	Sarah Healy; Ireland	4:18.71 CR	Emily Williams; Great Britain	4:22.11	Klaudia Kazimierska; Poland	4:22.90
3000 metres	Sarah Healy; Ireland	9:18.05 CR	İnci Kalkan; Turkey	9:24.01 PB	Alessia Zarbo; France	9:25.25 PB
100 metres hurdles	Martine Hjørnevik; Norway	13.26 EYL	Zoë Sedney; Netherlands	13.34	Johanna Plank; Austria	13.40 NYB
400 metres hurdles	Gisèle Wender; Germany	58.88 PB	Emma Silvestri; Italy	59.04 PB	Lena Pressler; Austria	59.11 NYB
2000 metres steeplechase	Léna Lebrun; France	6:35.41 WYL	Claire Palou; France	6:39.20	Paula Schneiders; Germany	6:40.00 PB
Medley relay	Italy; Rebecca Menchini; Noemi Cavalleri; Alessia Cappabianca; Chiara Gherardi; Eleonora Foudraz*	2:07.46 CR NYB	Czech Republic; Tereza Marková; Barbora Šplechtnová; Veronika Milotová; Barbora Malíková; Barbora Hůlková*; Denisa Folková*	2:09.41	Romania; Bianca Toader; Vanessa Balaci; Maria Scrob; Adina Cîrciogel	2:09.99
5000 metres walk	Hanna Zubkova; Belarus	22:45.47 CR	Olga Fiaska; Greece	23:39.12	Simona Bertini; Italy	24:18.80 PB

* Indicates the athlete only competed in the preliminary heats and received medals.

==== Field ====
Event	Gold		Silver		Bronze	
High jump	Yaroslava Mahuchikh; Ukraine	1.94 CR	Jessica Kähärä; Finland	1.83 PB	Maria Kochanova; Authorised Neutral Athletes	1.83
Pole vault	Leni Wildgrube; Germany	4.26 CR	Emma Brentel; France	4.16 NYB	Krystsina Kantsavienka; Belarus	4.00
Long jump	Tilde Johansson; Sweden	6.33	Emma Piffaretti; Switzerland	6.25	Spyridoula Karydi; Greece	6.23 NYB
Triple jump	María Vicente; Spain	13.95 CR	Aleksandra Nacheva; Bulgaria	13.88	Jessica Kähärä; Finland	13.29 NYB
Shot put	Lizaveta Dorts; Belarus	17.34	Nina Capațina; Moldova	17.27	Alida van Daalen; Netherlands	17.08
Discus throw	Violetta Ignatyeva; Authorised Neutral Athletes	54.56 PB	Alida van Daalen; Netherlands	52.93 PB	Özlem Becerek; Turkey	51.93
Hammer throw	Valeriya Ivanenko; Ukraine	73.25	Sara Killinen; Finland	69.52 PB	Stavroula Kosmidou; Greece	65.98
Javelin throw	Aliaksandra Konshyna; Belarus	56.71 PB	Münevver Hancı; Turkey	56.28	Gedly Tugi; Estonia	55.28 NYB

==== Combined ====
Event	Gold		Silver		Bronze	
Heptathlon	María Vicente; Spain	6221 WYB, CR	Kristīne Blaževiča; Latvia	5629 PB	Chiara-Belinda Schuler; Austria	5615 PB

== Medal table ==
* Host nation (Hungary)

Rank	Nation	Gold	Silver	Bronze	Total
1	Great Britain (GBR)	6	2	1	9
2	Italy (ITA)	4	4	1	9
3	Germany (GER)	4	2	1	7
4	Belarus (BLR)	4	0	1	5
5	France (FRA)	3	6	3	12
6	Spain (ESP)	3	2	0	5
7	Ireland (IRL)	3	1	0	4
7	Ukraine (UKR)	3	1	0	4
9	Norway (NOR)	2	1	1	4
–	Authorised Neutral Athletes (ANA)^{[1]}	2	0	2	4
10	Turkey (TUR)	1	4	2	7
11	Hungary (HUN)*	1	3	0	4
12	Netherlands (NED)	1	2	3	6
13	Czech Republic (CZE)	1	1	1	3
13	Sweden (SWE)	1	1	1	3
15	Poland (POL)	1	0	5	6
16	Iceland (ISL)	1	0	1	2
17	Finland (FIN)	0	2	2	4
17	Greece (GRE)	0	2	2	4
19	Bulgaria (BUL)	0	2	0	2
19	Latvia (LAT)	0	2	0	2
21	Switzerland (SUI)	0	1	1	2
22	Moldova (MLD)	0	1	0	1
23	Austria (AUT)	0	0	3	3
24	Estonia (EST)	0	0	2	2
24	Portugal (POR)	0	0	2	2
26	Azerbaijan (AZE)	0	0	1	1
26	Romania (ROU)	0	0	1	1
26	Serbia (SRB)	0	0	1	1
26	Slovakia (SVK)	0	0	1	1
Totals (29 entries)		41	40	39	120

Notes

^[1] Medals won by athletes competing as Authorised Neutral Athletes were not included in the official medal table.

== Participating nations ==
1135 competitors (538 boys and 597 girls) from 50 countries are expected to compete.

- Albania (1)
- Andorra (2)
- Armenia (2)
- Austria (31)
- Authorised Neutral Athletes (16)
- Azerbaijan (4)
- Belarus (43)
- Belgium (11)
- Bosnia and Herzegovina (5)
- Bulgaria (12)
- Croatia (21)
- Cyprus (8)
- Czech Republic (48)
- Denmark (5)
- Estonia (23)
- Finland (38)
- France (42)
- Georgia (5)
- Germany (66)
- Gibraltar (3)
- Great Britain (40)
- Greece (22)
- Hungary (78) (host)
- Iceland (5)
- Ireland (25)
- Israel (16)
- Italy (54)
- Kosovo (1)
- Latvia (25)
- Lithuania (27)
- Luxembourg (9)
- Macedonia (3)
- Malta (3)
- Moldova (3)
- Monaco (1)
- Montenegro (1)
- Netherlands (22)
- Norway (37)
- Poland (53)
- Portugal (18)
- Romania (27)
- San Marino (2)
- Serbia (17)
- Slovakia (24)
- Slovenia (17)
- Spain (50)
- Sweden (22)
- Switzerland (46)
- Turkey (52)
- Ukraine (49)

== Records ==
=== Under-18 World Best Performances ===
Athlete	Nation	Event	Result	Round	Date
María Vicente	Spain	Girls' heptathlon	6221 pts	Final	6 July
Myhaylo Kokhan	Ukraine	Boys' hammer throw	87.82 m	Final	7 July

=== Championship Records ===
Athlete	Nation	Event	Result	Round	Date
Hanna Zubkova	Belarus	Girls' 5000m race walk	22:45.47	Final	5 July
Sara Killinen	Finland	Girls' hammer throw	67.25 m	Qualification	5 July
Valeriya Ivanenko	Ukraine	Girls' hammer throw	74.36 m	Qualification	5 July
Patience Jumbo-Gula	Ireland	Girls' 100m	11.59 (+0.7 m/s)	Semifinals	5 July
María Vicente	Spain	Girls' long jump	6.37 (+1.8 m/s)	Heptathlon	6 July
Sam Bennett	Great Britain	Boys' 110m hurdles	13.33 (+1.7 m/s)	Heats	6 July
Kenny Fletcher	France	Boys' 110m hurdles	13.30 (+2.0 m/s)	Heats	6 July
Myhaylo Kokhan	Ukraine	Boys' hammer throw	82.42 m	Qualification	6 July
Sarah Healy	Ireland	Girls' 3000m	9:18.05	Final	6 July
Yasiel Brayan Sotero	Spain	Boys' discus throw	64.31 m	Final	6 July
Gaël de Coninck	Sweden	Girls' 800m	2:06.51	Semifinals	6 July
Pol Oriach	Spain	Boys' 2000m steeplechase	5:52.56	Heats	6 July
Leni Wildgrube	Germany	Girls' pole vault	4.26 m	Final	7 July
Lorenzo Benati	Italy	Boys' 400m	46.85	Final	7 July
Barbora Malíková	Czech Republic	Girls' 400m	52.66	Final	7 July
Kane Elliott	Great Britain	Boys' 1500m	3:55.26	Final	7 July
Marek Mucha	Poland	Boys' javelin throw	80.01 m	Final	7 July
Alexander Czysch	Germany	Boys' 200m	21.15	Final	7 July
Aleksandra Nacheva	Bulgaria	Girls' triple jump	13.32 m (+1.8 m/s)	Qualification	7 July
Sam Bennett	Great Britain	Boys' 110m hurdles	13.19 (+0.8 m/s)	Final	7 July
Keely Hodgkinson	Great Britain	Girls' 800m	2:04.84	Final	7 July
Martin Fraysse	France	Boys' 400m hurdles	50.63	Final	8 July
Dániel Huller	Hungary	Boys' 400m hurdles	50.63	Final	8 July
Max Burgin	Great Britain	Boys' 800m	1:47.36	Final	8 July
Sarah Healy	Ireland	Girls' 1500m	4:18.71	Final	8 July
Baptiste Guyon	France	Boys' 2000m steeplechase	5:43.92	Final	8 July
María Vicente	Spain	Girls' triple jump	13.95 m (+1.1 m/s)	Final	8 July
Pål Haugen Lillefosse	Norway	Boys' pole vault	5.46 m	Final	8 July
Rebecca Menchini; Noemi Cavalleri; Alessia Cappabianca; Chiara Gherardi	Italy	Girls' medley relay	2:07.46	Final	8 July
Yaroslava Mahuchikh	Ukraine	Girls' high jump	1.94 m	Final	8 July
