= 2017 World Youth Championships in Athletics – Boys' 400 metres =

Boy's 400 metres at the World U18 Championships
- Venue: Moi International Sports Centre
- Dates: 12–14 July 2017
- Winning time: 46.59

Medalists
gold medal	Antonio Watson	Jamaica
silver medal	Daniel Williams	Guyana
bronze medal	Colby Jennings	Turks and Caicos Islands

The Boys' 400 metres at the 2017 World Youth Championships in Athletics was held on 12–14 July.

== Records ==
Prior to the competition, the following records were as follows.

World Youth Best	Obea Moore (USA)	45.14	Santiago de Chile, Chile	2 September 1995
Championship Record	Kirani James (GRN)	45.24	Bressanone, Italy	10 July 2009
World Youth Leading	Tyrese Cooper (USA)	45.38	Albuquerque, New Mexico, United States	3 June 2017

== Heats ==
Qualification rule: first 4 of each heat (Q) and the next 4 fastest qualified.

Rank	Heat	Lane	Name	Nationality	Time	Notes
	1	1	Anthony Cox	Jamaica		
	1	2	Thiran Kalavitigoda Pathirannahalage	Sri Lanka		
	1	3	Gregor Grahovac	Slovenia		
	1	4	Correy Sherrod	Bahamas		
	1	5	Xu Bo	China		
	1	6	Patrice Remanoro	Madagascar		
	1	7	Ali Soleymani	Iran		
	1	8	Mohammad Jahir Rayhan	Bangladesh		
	2	2	Daniel Williams	Guyana		
	2	3	Elvin Josué Canales	Honduras		
	2	4	Thiruben Thana Rajan	Singapore		
	2	5	Melkamu Assefa	Ethiopia		
	2	6	Eric Layeng	Uganda		
	2	7	José Álvarez	Venezuela		
	2	8	Antonio Grant	Panama		
	3	1	Reuben Nichols	Saint Lucia		
	3	2	Musa Isah	Bahrain		
	3	3	Manish Manish	India		
	3	4	Kelvin Sawe Tauta	Kenya		
	3	5	Elián Larregina	Argentina		
	3	6	Mohamed Naail	Maldives		
	3	7	Yaroslav Demchenko	Ukraine		
	3	8	Nsikak Francis Okon	Nigeria		
	4	1	Yaroslav Holub	Ukraine		
	4	2	Deng Hantao	China		
	4	3	Mohammad Reza Dehghani	Iran		
	4	4	Alexandru Vlad	Romania		
	4	5	Antonio Watson	Jamaica		
	4	6	David Sanayek	Kenya		
	4	7	Ivan Danny Geldenhuis	Namibia		
	4	8	Akshay Nain	India		
	5	2	Tyrell Simms	Bahamas		
	5	3	Emmanuel Goni	Uganda		
	5	4	Bruno Benedito da Silva	Brazil		
	5	5	Diego Camacho	Venezuela		
	5	6	Kennedy Luchembe	Zambia		
	5	7	Bernard Olesitse	Botswana		
	5	8	Colby Jennings	Turks and Caicos Islands		

== Semifinals ==
=== Semifinal 1 ===
Rank	Name	Nationality	Reaction	Time	Notes
1	Colby Jennings	Turks and Caicos Islands	0.224	47.36	Q, PB
2	Melkamu Assefa	Ethiopia	0.214	47.43	Q
3	Kelvin Sawe Tauta	Kenya	0.370	47.55	
4	Elvin Josué Canales	Honduras	0.243	48.21	
5	Thiruben Thana Rajan	Singapore	0.171	48.40	
6	Musa Isah	Bahrain	0.187	48.43	
7	Xu Bo	China	0.226	48.90	
8	Bernard Olesitse	Botswana	0.161	50.54	

=== Semifinal 2 ===
Rank	Name	Nationality	Reaction	Time	Notes
1	Anthony Cox	Jamaica	0.266	46.86	Q
2	Ivan Danny Geldenhuys	Namibia	0.181	47.24	Q, PB
3	Daniel Williams	Guyana	0.186	47.46	q
4	David Sanayek	Kenya	0.199	47.66	
5	Mohammad Jahir Rayhan	Bangladesh	0.198	48.22	
6	José Álvarez	Venezuela	0.160	48.79	
7	Deng Hantao	China	0.185	49.12	
8	Tyrell Simms	Bahamas	0.167	49.38	

=== Semifinal 3 ===
Rank	Name	Nationality	Reaction	Time	Notes
1	Bruno Benedito da Silva	Brazil	0.215	46.87	Q, PB
2	Antonio Watson	Jamaica	0.000	47.05	Q, PB
3	Gregor Grahovac	Slovenia	0.183	47.34	q, PB
4	Yaroslav Demchenko	Ukraine	0.178	47.96	PB
5	Reuben Nichols	Saint Lucia	0.215	48.01	PB
6	Correy Sherrod	Bahamas	0.211	48.56	
7	Thiran Kalavitigoda Pathirannahalage	Sri Lanka	0.188	48.89	
–	Antonio Grant	Panama	—N/a	—N/a	DQ

== Final ==
Rank	Name	Nationality	Reaction	Time	Notes
1st place, gold medalist(s)	Antonio Watson	Jamaica	0.174	46.59	PB
2nd place, silver medalist(s)	Daniel Williams	Guyana	0.200	46.72	PB
3rd place, bronze medalist(s)	Colby Jennings	Turks and Caicos Islands	0.213	46.77	PB
4	Anthony Cox	Jamaica	0.210	46.77	
5	Melkamu Assefa	Ethiopia	0.249	47.05	
6	Bruno Benedito da Silva	Brazil	0.231	47.15	
7	Ivan Danny Geldenhuys	Namibia	0.192	47.17	PB
8	Gregor Grahovac	Slovenia	0.157	48.88	
