= Priscilla van Oorschot =

Dutch athlete (born 1996)

Personal information
- Nationality: Dutch
- Born: 3 September 1996 (age 29)

Sport
- Sport: Athletics
- Event: Middle distance running

Achievements and titles
- Personal best: 800m: 2:02.67 (2024)

Priscilla van Oorschot (born 3 September 1996) is a Dutch middle distance runner. She won Dutch national titles over 800 metres outdoors in 2024 and 2026, and indoors in 2025 and 2026. She represented the Netherlands over that distance at the 2025 European Athletics Indoor Championships.

== Biography ==
From Zaandam in North Holland. She participated in athletics from the age of 10 years-old, and initially trained in combined-events. Until 2019, she competed mainly in the field events; triple jump and long jump. In 2014, she set a new Dutch junior national indoor record for the triple jump. From 2020, she focused solidly on running, and chose to concentrate on the 400 metres and the 800 metres. She trains in Zaandam under coach Peter Wolters in a small group of athletes that includes Jurjen Polderman and Marissa Damink.

In February 2024, she was runner-up to Bregje Sloot over 800 metres at the Dutch Indoor Athletics Championships in Appeldoorn, in a time of 2;12.99. She then won the Dutch outdoor 800 metres title at the Dutch Athletics Championships in June 2024 in Hengelo, running a time of 2:04.58.

She then also won the Dutch national indoor title over 800 metres in February 2025 in Apeldoorn, running - time of 2:07.89. She was a late addition to the Dutch team selected for the 2025 European Athletics Indoor Championships, in Apeldoorn, Netherlands. Competing in the 800 metres at the championships, she ran a time of 2:09.07 in her qualifying heat to finish in sixth place, and did not progress to the semi-finals.

Van Oorschot ran 2:07.20 to win the 800 metres at the 2026 Dutch Indoor Athletics Championships in Apeldoorn. In July, she also won the 800 metres title at the Dutch Outdoor Championships.
