= Petrucciani =

Petrucciani is a surname. Notable people with the surname include:

- Michel Petrucciani (1962–1999), French jazz pianist
- Oliver Petrucciani (born 1969), Swiss motorcycle racer
- Ricky Petrucciani (born 2000), Swiss athlete
