= 2024 World Athletics Combined Events Tour =

- Edition: 26th
- Dates: 27 January – 15 September; 27 April – 15 September (Gold)
- Meetings: 13 (Total); 6 (Gold)
- Winner: (Estonia) Johannes Erm (men) (United States) Michelle Atherley (women)

The 2024 World Athletics Combined Events Tour was the 26th edition of the global series of combined track and field event meetings organised by World Athletics. This was the third season to feature the three-tier World Tour format, dividing the meetings into three competition sub-groups: Gold, Silver and Bronze.

== Rules ==
Athletes were ranked by their best three World Athletics ranking points scores achieved during the season. Ranking points were allowed to be collected on both outdoor (decathlon/heptathlon) and indoor (heptathlon/pentathlon) events. While at least two of the scores had to come from Combined Events Tour meetings, one could come from any other competition on the International Calendar.

The total prize money was US$202,000, split evenly between male and female athletes. The male and female winners each received $30,000, while second and third placed athletes were entitled to $20,000 and $15,000 respectively. Smaller prizes were given to the rest of the top eight finishers.

== Calendar ==
The calendar featured 6 Gold, 5 Silver, and 2 Bronze level meetings. Results of continental championships and Olympic Games also counted.

Start date	Meeting	City	Country
Gold (6)
27 Apr	Multistars	Brescia	Italy
11 May	Meeting Arona Pruebas Combinadas	Arona	Spain
18 May	Hypo-Meeting	Götzis	Austria
22 Jun	Stadtwerke Ratingen Mehrkampf-Meeting	Ratingen	Germany
31 Aug	Wiesław Czapiewski Memorial	Nakło nad Notecią	Poland
14 Sep	Décastar	Talence	France
Silver (5)
27 Jan	X-ATHLETICS	Aubiére	France
3 Feb	Combined Events Tour Tallinn	Tallinn	Estonia
17 Apr	Mt. SAC Relays	Walnut, CA	United States
21 Jun	US Olympic Team Trials - Open Combined Events Championships	Eugene, OR	United States
29 Jun	EAP International Combined Events Meeting: Hexham	Hexham	Great Britain
Bronze (2)
11 May	Aligenis Milos Combined Events Meeting	Milos	Greece
10 Aug	Sollentuna Combined Events	Sollentuna	Sweden

== Results ==
=== Men ===
Meet	First		Second		Third	
Multistars	Jente Hauttekeete (BEL)	8020	Risto Lillemets (EST)	7971	Téo Bastien (FRA)	7963
Meeting Arona	Malik Diakite (GER)	8037	Jeff Tesselaar (NED)	8035	Lewis Church (GBR)	7742
Hypo-Meeting	Damien Warner (CAN)	8678	Sven Roosen (NED)	8517	Johannes Erm (EST)	8462
Mehrkampf-Meeting Ratingen	Till Steinforth (GER)	8287	Felix Wolter (GER)	8226	Vilem Strasky (CZE)	7986
Wiesław Czapiewski Memorial	Felix Wolter (GER)	8068	Yuma Maruyama (JPN)	8021	Risto Lillemets (EST)	8012
Décastar	Johannes Erm (EST)	8589	Sander Skotheim (NOR)	8517	Sven Roosen (NED)	8293

== Overall standings ==
Rankings of athletes who competed at three series meets or more.

=== Men ===
Rank	Athlete	First Meet		Second Meet		Third Meet		Points
Rank	Athlete	Points	Venue	Points	Venue	Points	Venue	Points
1st place, gold medalist(s)	Johannes Erm (EST)							3661
2nd place, silver medalist(s)	Sander Skotheim (NOR)							3624
3rd place, bronze medalist(s)	Heath Baldwin (USA)							3614
4	Sven Roosen (NED)							3599
5	Devon Williams (USA)							3477

=== Women ===
Rank	Athlete	First Meet		Second Meet		Third Meet		Points
Rank	Athlete	Points	Venue	Points	Venue	Points	Venue	Points
1st place, gold medalist(s)	Michelle Atherley (USA)							3466
2nd place, silver medalist(s)	Taliyah Brooks (USA)							3421
3rd place, bronze medalist(s)	Emma Oosterwegel (NED)							3421
4	Kate O'Connor (IRL)							3326
5	Vanessa Grimm (GER)							3320
