= Tessy Ebosele =

Spanish athlete (born 2002)

Personal information
- Full name: Tessy Ebosele Ebosele
- Nationality: Nigerian (former); Spanish (current)
- Born: 28 July 2002 (age 24) Morocco
- Height: 1.73 m (5 ft 8 in)

Sport
- Sport: Athletics
- Events: Long jump Triple jump

Achievements and titles
- Personal bests: Long Jump: 6.80m (Castellón, 2023); Triple Jump: 13.63m (Nairobi, 2021)
Medal record
Women's athletics
Representing Spain
World U20 Championships
Silver medal – second place	2021 Nairobi	Triple jump
European U23 Championships
Bronze medal – third place	2023 Espoo	Long jump
European U20 Championships
Silver medal – second place	2021 Tallinn	Long jump

Tessy Ebosele Ebosele (born 28 July 2002) is a track and field athlete who competes in both long jump and triple jump. Born in Morocco to Nigerian parents, she represents Spain.

== Early life ==
Ebosele was born in Morocco, from a family from Benin City, Nigeria. When she was a year and a half old, she moved to Spain with her mother, and lived in Vitoria-Gasteiz in Álava. She began to practice rhythmic gymnastics as a child, but at the age of 13 years-old opted for athletics. She moved to San Sebastián to study law and train with the club at Real Sociedad.

== Career ==
In July 2018, she landed a triple jump of 13.23m, which placed her fourth in the world for an under-18 athlete. In February 2019, in San Sebastián, she went beyond that, mark, setting a new personal best of 13.29 metres.

Ebosele won silver in the long jump at the 2021 European Athletics U20 Championships in Tallinn, Estonia with a personal best distance of 6.63m. Ebosele won silver in the triple jump at the 2021 World Athletics U20 Championships in Nairobi with a personal best distance of 13.63m. In the same championships, she finished fifth in the long jump. At the end of that year she moved to Guadalajara, Spain to join Iván Pedroso's training group, alongside other jumpers such as Ana Peleteiro, Fátima Diame, Alexis Copello and world record holder Yulimar Rojas.

Ebosele won bronze in the long jump at the 2023 European Athletics U23 Championships. Ebosele finished eighth at the 2023 World Athletics Championships long jump in Budapest.

She competed at the 2024 European Athletics Championships in Rome in June 2024. She competed in the long jump at the 2024 Paris Olympics.

In August 2026, she competed at the 2026 European Athletics Championships in Birmingham, England.
