= David Sombé =

French sprinter (born 2000)

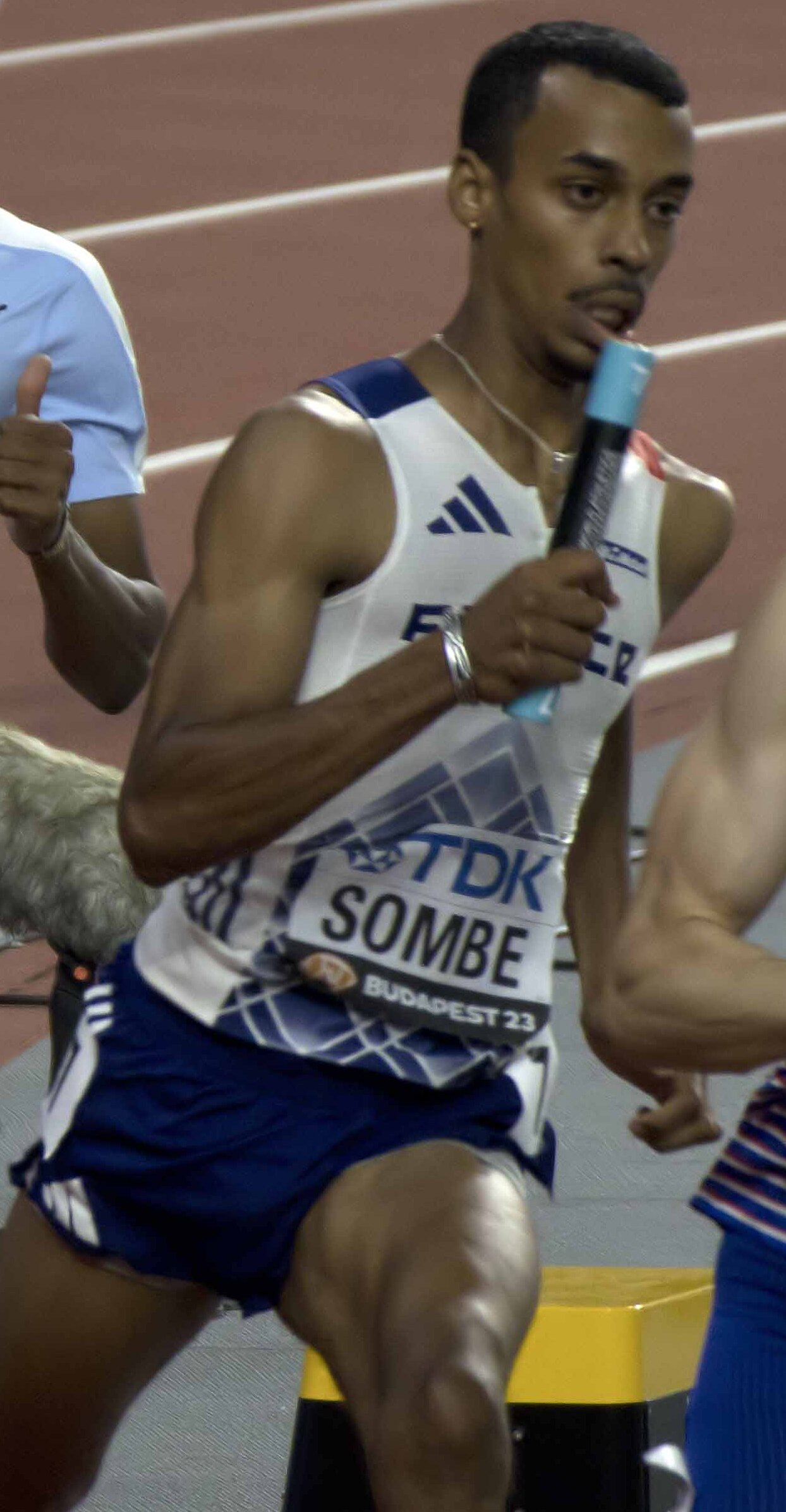
- David Sombé in 2023

Personal information
- Nationality: French
- Born: 24 April 2000 (age 26) Paris, France
- Height: 1.88 m (6 ft 2 in)

Sport
- Sport: Athletics
- Event: 400 metres
- Club: Asptt Lille Metropole
- Coached by: Antoine Lavergne

Achievements and titles
- Personal bests: Outdoor; 400 m: 45.32 (Montreuil 2023); Indoor; 400 m: 46.83 (Eaubonne 2022)
Medal record
Men's athletics
Representing France
World Championships
Silver medal – second place	2023 Budapest	4×400 m relay
European U23 Championships
Gold medal – first place	2021 Tallinn	4×400 m relay

David Sombé (born 24 April 2000) is a French sprinter who specializes in the 400 metres. He won a silver medal in the 4×400 m relay at the 2023 World Athletics Championships, setting a national record of 2:58.45 in the process.
