= María Vicente =

Spanish athletics competitor

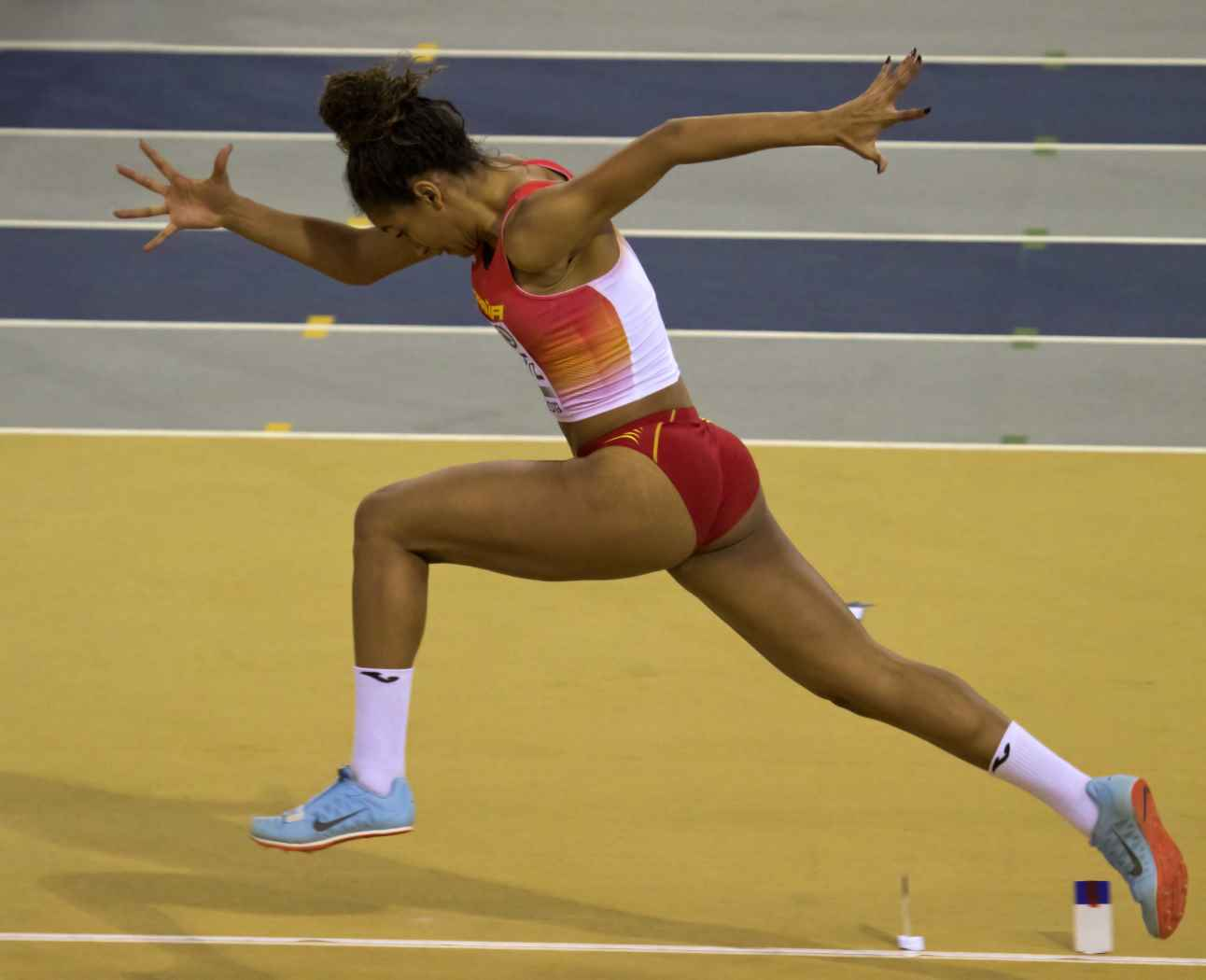
- María Vicente in 2019

Personal information
- Full name: María Sophia Vicente García
- Born: 28 March 2001 (age 25) L'Hospitalet de Llobregat, Spain
- Height: 1.78 m (5 ft 10 in)
- Weight: 68 kg (150 lb)

Sport
- Sport: Athletics
- Events: Heptathlon, Triple jump
- Club: C.D. Nike Running
- Coached by: Ramón Cid
Medal record
Women's athletics
Representing Spain
Youth Olympic Games
Silver medal – second place	2018 Buenos Aires	Triple jump
European Youth Olympic Festival
Gold medal – first place	2017 Győr	Triple jump
World U18 Championships
Gold medal – first place	2017 Nairobi	Heptathlon
European U18 Championships
Gold medal – first place	2018 Győr	Heptathlon
Gold medal – first place	2018 Győr	Triple jump
European U20 Championships
Gold medal – first place	2019 Borås	Heptathlon
European U23 Championships
Gold medal – first place	2023 Espoo	Triple jump

María Sophia Vicente García (born 28 March 2001) is a Spanish athlete specialising in combined events and triple jump. She is the holder of the U18 World Best in pentathlon, as well as the senior Spanish national record in pentathlon and heptathlon.

== Personal life ==
Vicente's father was born in Cuba, while her mother is from Huélamo, Cuenca, Castile-La Mancha.

== Personal bests ==
Outdoor

- 200 m: 23.03 s (+0.5 m/s)
- Long jump: 6.80 m (+1.6 m/s)
- Triple jump: 14.21 m (+1.9 m/s)
- Heptathlon: 6304 points NR
- Heptathlon U18: 6221 points

Indoor

- 60 m hurdles: 8.06 s
- Long jump: 6.70 m
- Triple jump: 13.71 m
- Pentathlon: 4728 points NR
- Pentathlon U18: 4371 points WR U18

== International competitions ==
Year	Competition	Venue	Position	Event	Notes
Representing Spain
2017	European Youth Olympic Festival	Győr, Hungary	1st	Triple jump	13.72 m
2017	World U18 Championships	Nairobi, Kenya	1st	Heptathlon U18	5612 pts
2018	European U18 Championships	Győr, Hungary	1st	Heptathlon U18	6221 pts WYB
2018	European U18 Championships	Győr, Hungary	1st	Triple jump	13.95 m
2018	European Championships	Berlin, Germany	25th (q)	Triple jump	13.50 m
2018	Youth Olympic Games	Buenos Aires, Argentina	2nd	Triple jump	13.76 m
2019	European Indoor Championships	Glasgow, United Kingdom	9th	Pentathlon	4363 pts
2019	European U20 Championships	Borås, Sweden	1st	Heptathlon	6115 pts NR
2019	European U20 Championships	Borås, Sweden	8th	4 × 100 m relay	DQ
2021	European Indoor Championships	Toruń, Poland	–	Pentathlon	DNF
2021	European Team Championships	Chorzów, Poland	3rd	Long jump	6.42 m
2021	Olympic Games	Tokyo, Japan	18th	Heptathlon	6117 pts
2022	European Championships	Munich, Germany	–	Heptathlon	DNF
2023	European U23 Championships	Espoo, Finland	4th	Long jump	6.56 m
2023	European U23 Championships	Espoo, Finland	1st	Triple jump	14.21 m
2023	World Championships	Budapest, Hungary	14th (q)	Long jump	6.59 m
2023	World Championships	Budapest, Hungary	13th (q)	Triple jump	14.13 m
2024	World Indoor Championships	Glasgow, United Kingdom	–	Pentathlon	DNF
2025	World Championships	Tokyo, Japan	12th	Heptathlon	6207 pts
2026	European Championships	Birmingham, United Kingdom	8th	Heptathlon	6372 pts
