= Aleksandra Nacheva =

Bulgarian athlete (born 2001)

Personal information
- Born: 20 August 2001 (age 24) Plovdiv, Bulgaria

Sport
- Country: Bulgaria
- Sport: Long jump, triple jump
Medal record
| Event | 1st | 2nd | 3rd |
|---|---|---|---|
| European Championships | 0 | 0 | 1 |
| Youth Olympic Games | 1 | 0 | 0 |
| World U20 Championships | 1 | 0 | 0 |
| European U20 Championships | 0 | 1 | 0 |
| World U18 Championships | 0 | 1 | 0 |
| European U18 Championships | 0 | 1 | 0 |
| Total | 2 | 3 | 1 |
Women's athletics
Representing Bulgaria
European Championships
| Bronze medal – third place | 2026 Birmingham | Triple jump |
Youth Olympic Games
| Gold medal – first place | 2018 Buenos Aires | Triple jump |
World U20 Championships
| Gold medal – first place | 2018 Tampere | Triple jump |
European Athletics U20 Championships
| Silver medal – second place | 2019 Borås | Triple jump |
IAAF World U18 Championships
| Silver medal – second place | 2017 Nairobi | Triple jump |
European Athletics U18 Championships
| Silver medal – second place | 2018 Győr | Triple jump |

Aleksandra Nacheva (Bulgarian: Александра Начева; born 20 August 2001) is a Bulgarian athlete who competes in long jump and triple jump.

== Career ==
During the 2017 season, Nacheva won silver at the 2017 IAAF World U18 Championships in Nairobi, Kenya and finished 4th at the European Athletics U20 Championships in Grosseto, Italy.

At the 2018 European Athletics U18 Championships, Nacheva won silver in triple jump with 13.88m, behind Spaniard María Vicente with 13.95m. On 15 July 2018 she won gold in triple jump at the 2018 IAAF World U20 Championships, becoming the first Bulgarian athlete to win in the age group since Tezdzhan Naimova in Beijing 2006. Her result of 14.18m was a personal best and the world leading for the year so far. She became the second Bulgarian female triple jumper to win the Junior world title, after Tereza Marinova, whose 14.62m result in Atlanta 1996 remains the world record.

On 16 October 2018 Nacheva won gold in triple jump at the 2018 Summer Youth Olympics in Buenos Aires, scoring a total of 27.62m in the two-stage final - 13.76m and 13.86m, respectively. This meant that she had won a medal in each of the three major youth athletics events held during 2018. Nacheva received further recognition during the 2018 Bulgarian Sportsperson of the Year award ceremony held on December 20, after being ranked in 3rd place, after winner Taybe Yusein and runner-up Mirela Demireva.

Nacheva won the bronze medal in the triple jump at the 2026 European Championships in Birmingham, England.

== Personal best ==
Results were last updated on 16 August 2026.

| Discipline | Distance | Date | Location | Event | Notes |
|---|---|---|---|---|---|
| Long jump | 6.32 m | 24 AUG 2019 | Plovdiv, Bulgaria | | (wind: -0.8 m/s) |
| Triple jump | 14.35 m | 09 JUN 2024 | Rome, Italy | European Championships | (wind: -0.9 m/s) |
| Triple jump wind assisted | 14.40 m | 13 AUG 2026 | Birmingham, United Kingdom | European Championships | (wind: +3.4 m/s) |

== Competition record ==
| Year | Competition | Venue | Position | Event | Notes |
Representing Bulgaria
| 2017 | World U18 Championships | Nairobi, Kenya | 2nd | Triple jump | 13.54 m (wind: +0.5 m/s) |
| 2017 | European U20 Championships | Grosseto, Italy | 4th | Triple jump | 13.64 m (wind: +1.1 m/s) |
| 2018 | European U18 Championships | Győr, Hungary | 2nd | Triple jump | 13.88 m (wind: +0.7 m/s) |
| 2018 | World U20 Championships | Tampere, Finland | 1st | Triple jump | 14.18 m (wind: +1.6 m/s) |
| 2018 | European Championships | Berlin, Germany | 26th (q) | Triple jump | 13.39 m |
| 2018 | Youth Olympic Games | Buenos Aires, Argentina | 1st | Triple jump | 13.76 + 13.86 m |
| 2019 | European Indoor Championships | Glasgow, United Kingdom | 17th (q) | Triple jump | 12.98 m |
| 2019 | European U20 Championships | Borås, Sweden | 2nd | Triple jump | 13.81 m |
| 2019 | World Championships | Doha, Qatar | 26th (q) | Triple jump | 13.05 m |
| 2022 | European Championships | Munich, Germany | 11th | Triple jump | 13.33 m |
| 2023 | European Indoor Championships | Istanbul, Turkey | 16th (q) | Triple jump | 13.26 m |
| 2023 | European U23 Championships | Espoo, Finland | 31st (q) | Long jump | 5.69 m |
| 2023 | European U23 Championships | Espoo, Finland | 5th | Triple jump | 13.40 m |
| 2024 | European Championships | Rome, Italy | 4th | Triple jump | 14.35 m |
| 2026 | World Indoor Championships | Toruń, Poland | 8th | Triple jump | 14.05 m |
| 2026 | European Championships | Birmingham, UK | 3rd | Triple jump | 14.40 m (wind: +3.4 m/s) |

== Awards ==
- Bulgarian Sportsperson of the Year - 3rd place (2018)
