= Jack Mitchell (athlete) =

American ski cross athlete

Jack Mitchell is an American ski cross athlete from Wenatchee, Washington. A member of the U.S. Ski Cross team, he is a four-time U.S. national ski cross champion.

== Early life ==
Mitchell was born in Tacoma, Washington, and began competitive skiing at age seven. He developed as a racer at Mission Ridge Ski and Board Resort, training with the Mission Ridge Ski Team and the affiliated Mission Ridge Ski Education Foundation.

== Career ==
In June 2020, Mitchell was selected for U.S. Ski & Snowboard's Project Gold Camp. The camp was later cancelled because of the COVID-19 pandemic. On April 4, 2021, Mitchell won his first U.S. National Ski Cross Championship at Copper Mountain, Colorado.

During the 2022–23 season, Mitchell was selected for the U.S. team at the 2023 Ski Cross Junior World Championships at San Pellegrino Pass, Italy, alongside Tanner Murphy and Walker Robinson. Earlier that season, he placed third at a North American Cup event at Gore Mountain, New York, and fourth at the 2023 Winter World University Games.

In December 2023, Mitchell was named to the U.S. World Cup team, joining Chris Del Bosco and Tyler Wallasch. He made his World Cup debut the following month at Nakiska Ski Area in Kananaskis, Alberta.

In April 2024, Mitchell represented the United States at the Ski Cross Junior World Championships in Idre Fjäll, Sweden. He placed ninth in the individual competition and won a bronze medal in the team event with Morgan Shute.

For the 2024–25 season, Mitchell was named to the U.S. World Cup team for a second consecutive year. At the Nor-Am Cup season opener in Nakiska, he placed second and third in successive events, becoming one of two racers to reach the podium twice. The results earned him the No. 3 U.S. ranking behind Wallasch and Del Bosco.

In March 2025, Mitchell was selected for the U.S. ski cross roster at the FIS Freestyle World Ski Championships in Engadin, Switzerland. He ended the season by winning his third U.S. National Ski Cross Championship at Copper Mountain in April.

Mitchell entered the 2025–26 season as a third-year U.S. World Cup athlete. He began the season with gold- and bronze-medal finishes at the Nor-Am Cup in Nakiska in January 2026. He later won gold and silver at the Nor-Am Cup finals at Keystone Resort, Colorado, reaching his 13th career Nor-Am podium. He also competed in World and European Cup events in France, Italy and Switzerland

On April 6, 2026, Mitchell won his fourth U.S. National Ski Cross Championship at Copper Mountain. By the end of the season, he had recorded 26 career podium finishes. His 13 NorAm Cup podiums tie him for the most by an American, and he finished as the #2 ranked US racer.
