= Bregje Sloot =

Dutch athlete (born 2000)

Personal information
- Nationality: Dutch
- Born: 28 January 2000 (age 26)

Sport
- Sport: Athletics
- Event: Middle distance running

Achievements and titles
- Personal best: 800m: 2:01.30 (2023)

Bregje Sloot (born 28 January 2000) is a Dutch middle distance runner. She is a multiple-time Dutch national champion over 800 metres.

== Career ==
From Lobith, in Gelderland, she ran as a youngster as a member of Running Team Liemers. She lowered her 800 metres personal best to 2:02.51 in July 2020 in Papendal.

She won her first Dutch Athletics Championships title in 2021, winning in the 800 metres in Breda. She competed at the 2021 European Athletics Indoor Championships in Poland, in the women's 800 metres, running 2:07.33 in the heats and not progressing through to the semi-finals.

After a spell out with injury, she lowered her 800m personal best to 2:01.30 running in Slovakia in 2023. She won the Dutch national title in 2023 over 800 metres, finishing ahead of Marissa Damink in Breda.

She won the Dutch Indoor Athletics Championships in Appeldorn in February 2024 in the 800 metres, finishing ahead of Priscilla van Oorschot and Maud de Jong.
