= Athletics at the 2018 Summer Youth Olympics – Girls' high jump =

Girls' high jump at the III Summer Youth Olympic Games
- Venue: Parque Polideportivo Roca
- Date: 12, 15 October
- Competitors: 17 from 17 nations

Medalists
1st place, gold medalist(s)		Yaroslava Mahuchikh	Ukraine
2nd place, silver medalist(s)		Mariya Kochanova	Russia
3rd place, bronze medalist(s)		Jessica Kähärä	Finland

The girls' high jump competition at the 2018 Summer Youth Olympics was held on 12 and 15 October at the Parque Polideportivo Roca.

== Schedule ==
All times are in local time (UTC-3).

Date	Time	Round
Friday, 12 October 2018	15:05	Stage 1
Monday, 15 October 2018	14:20	Stage 2

== Results ==
=== Stage 1 ===
Rank	Athlete	Nation	1.55	1.60	1.65	1.70	1.74	1.78	1.81	1.84	1.87	1.92	1.95	Result	Notes
1	Yaroslava Mahuchikh	Ukraine	–	–	–	–	–	o	xo	o	xo	o	xxx	1.92	
2	Mariya Kochanova	Russia	–	–	–	o	o	o	xxo	xo	xxx			1.84	
3	Jessica Kähärä	Finland	–	–	–	o	o	xo	o	xxx				1.81	
4	Jenna Feyerabend	Germany	–	xo	o	o	o	o	xxx					1.78	SB
4	Elizabeth Moss	Australia	–	–	o	o	xo	o	xxx					1.78	=PB
6	Bára Sajdoková	Czech Republic	–	–	o	o	o	xo	xxx					1.78	
7	Nota Dosi	Greece	–	–	–	o	xo	xxx						1.74	
7	Nadine Odermatt	Switzerland	–	o	o	o	xo	xxx						1.74	
9	Veronika Chaynov	Israel	–	o	o	xo	xo	xxx						1.74	
10	Wiktoria Miąso	Poland	–	xo	o	o	xxo	xxx						1.74	
11	Liu Yiwen	China	–	o	o	xo	xxx							1.70	
12	Claudina Díaz	Mexico	o	o	o	xxo	xxx							1.70	
12	Idea Pieroni	Italy	–	o	o	xxo	xxx							1.70	
14	Leja Glojnarič	Slovenia	–	o	o	xxx								1.65	
15	Shantae Foreman	Jamaica	–	xo	xo	xxx								1.65	
16	Bianca Erasmus	South Africa	xxo	o	xo	xxx								1.65	
	Rosemaline Watley	Marshall Islands	xxx											NM	

=== Stage 2 ===
Rank	Athlete	Nation	1.58	1.63	1.68	1.72	1.76	1.79	1.82	1.85	1.87	1.89	1.95	Result	Notes
1	Yaroslava Mahuchikh	Ukraine	–	–	–	–	–	o	o	–	o	o	o	1.95	PB
2	Mariya Kochanova	Russia	–	–	–	o	o	o	o	o	xo	xxx		1.87	=PB
3	Elizabeth Moss	Australia	–	–	o	o	o	o	o	xxx				1.82	PB
4	Jessica Kähärä	Finland	–	–	–	o	o	o	xo	xxx				1.82	
5	Bára Sajdoková	Czech Republic	–	xo	o	o	o	o	xxx					1.79	
6	Jenna Feyerabend	Germany	–	o	o	xo	xo	o	xxx					1.79	SB
7	Veronika Chaynov	Israel	–	o	–	xo	o	xxo	xxx					1.79	=PB
8	Nota Dosi	Greece	–	–	–	o	xxo	xxo	xxx					1.79	
8	Wiktoria Miąso	Poland	–	xo	o	o	xo	xxo	xxx					1.79	
10	Idea Pieroni	Italy	–	o	o	o	xo	xxx						1.76	
11	Shantae Foreman	Jamaica	–	o	xo	xxo	xo	xxx						1.76	
12	Leja Glojnarič	Slovenia	–	o	o	o	xxx							1.72	
13	Nadine Odermatt	Switzerland	–	o	o	xo	xxx							1.72	
14	Claudina Díaz	Mexico	–	xo	o	xo	xxx							1.72	
15	Liu Yiwen	China	o	xo	o	xxx								1.68	
16	Bianca Erasmus	South Africa	o	o	xxx									1.63	
	Rosemaline Watley	Marshall Islands	xxx											NM	

=== Final placing ===
Rank	Athlete	Nation	Stage 1	Stage 2	Total
1st place, gold medalist(s)	Yaroslava Mahuchikh	Ukraine	1.92	1.95	3.87
2nd place, silver medalist(s)	Mariya Kochanova	Russia	1.84	1.87	3.71
3rd place, bronze medalist(s)	Jessica Kähärä	Finland	1.81	1.82	3.63
4	Elizabeth Moss	Australia	1.78	1.82	3.60
5	Jenna Feyerabend	Germany	1.78	1.79	3.57
5	Bára Sajdoková	Czech Republic	1.78	1.79	3.57
7	Veronika Chaynov	Israel	1.74	1.79	3.53
7	Nota Dosi	Greece	1.74	1.79	3.53
7	Wiktoria Miąso	Poland	1.74	1.79	3.53
10	Idea Pieroni	Italy	1.70	1.76	3.46
11	Nadine Odermatt	Switzerland	1.74	1.72	3.46
12	Claudina Díaz	Mexico	1.70	1.72	3.42
13	Shantae Foreman	Jamaica	1.65	1.76	3.41
14	Liu Yiwen	China	1.70	1.68	3.38
15	Leja Glojnarič	Slovenia	1.65	1.72	3.37
16	Bianca Erasmus	South Africa	1.65	1.63	3.28
	Rosemaline Watley	Marshall Islands	NM	NM	
