= Pol Oriach =

Spanish middle-distance runner (born 2002)

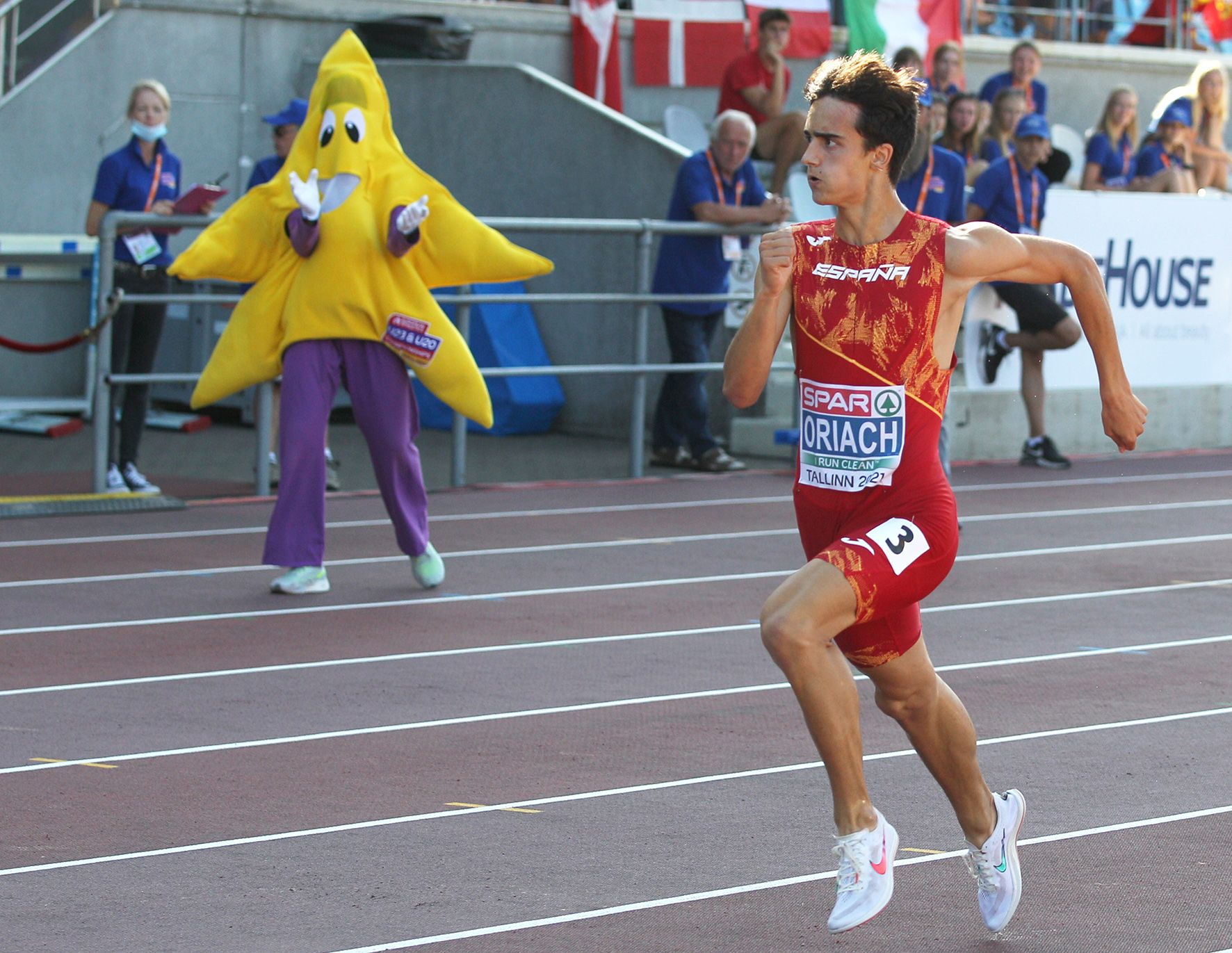
- Oriach in 2021

Personal information
- Born: 20 September 2002 (age 23)

Sport
- Sport: Athletics
- Event(s): Middle-distance running, Cross country running
Medal record
Men's athletics
Representing Spain
European U20 Championships
Gold medal – first place	2021 Tallinn	3000m steeplechase
European U18 Championships
Silver medal – second place	2018 Győr	2000m steeplechase
European Youth Olympic Festival
Gold medal – first place	2019 Baku	2000m steeplechase

Pol Oriach (born 20 September 2002) is a Spanish middle-distance and cross country runner.

== Biography ==
Oriach is from Aragón, and won the silver medal in the 2000 metres steeplechase at the 2018 European Athletics U18 Championships in Győr, Hungary. In January 2019, he broke the broke the Spanish U18 3000 metres record held by Aarón Las Heras with a time of 8:19.33. That year, he won the gold medal in the 2000 metres steeplechase at the 2019 European Youth Olympic Festival (EYOF) in Baku, Azerbaijan.

In 2021, he won the 3000m steeplechase at the 2021 European Athletics U20 Championships in Tallinn, Estonia, in 8:41.36. That summer, he also ran 3:37.67 for the 1500m at the age 18 years-old. The year, he finished in fourth place in the 1500m race at the 2021 World Athletics U20 Championships in Nairobi, Kenya, in 3:40.36. In December, he finished fourth in the U20 race at the 2021 European Cross Country Championships in Dublin.

At the 2023 World Athletics Cross Country Championships in Bathurst, Australia, he competed for Spain in the mixed relay. Competing in the 1500m at the Ibero-American Meeting in Huelva in June 2023, Oriach lowered his personal best to 3:36.24. In July, he finished fifth in the 1500 meters at the 2023 European Athletics U23 Championships in Espoo, Finland in 3:44.85. That month, he also finished fifth over that distance at the senior Spanish Athletics Championships.

In his final year of eligibility at that level he won the Spanish under-23 title over 1500 metres in July 2024. In December 2024, his Spanish team placed fifth in the U23 team race at the 2024 European Cross Country Championships in Antalya, Turkey.

In February 2025, Oriach became Spanish indoor champion in the 3000 metres, running 7:57.47 to win his first senior Spanish Indoor Athletics Championships title.

In July, he finished fourth in the 1500 metres at the 2025 Summer World University Games in Bochum, Germany. In September 2025, he competed at in the 1500 metres at the 2025 World Championships in Tokyo, Japan, without advancing to the semi-finals.

Oriach ran an indoor personal best of 7:39.10 for the 3000 metres in 2026. He was selected for the 2026 World Athletics Indoor Championships in Poland, placing tenth in the 3000 metres in 7:39.73.
