= 2021 World Athletics U20 Championships – Women's triple jump =

Women's triple jump at the 2021 World Athletics U20 Championships
- Venue: Kasarani Stadium
- Dates: 19 August (qualification); 20 August (final)
- Competitors: 22 from 19 nations
- Winning distance: 13.75 m

Medalists
gold medal	Maja Åskag	Sweden
silver medal	Tessy Ebosele	Spain
bronze medal	Darja Sopova	Latvia

The women's triple jump at the 2021 World Athletics U20 Championships was held at the Kasarani Stadium on 19 and 20 August.

== Records ==
Standing records prior to the 2021 World Athletics U20 Championships
World U20 Record	Tereza Marinova (BUL)	14.62	Sydney, Australia	25 August 1996
Championship Record	Tereza Marinova (BUL)	14.62	Sydney, Australia	25 August 1996
World U20 Leading	Leyanis Pérez (CUB)	14.53	Castellón de la Plana, Spain	29 June 2021

== Results ==
=== Qualification ===
The qualification took place on 19 August, in two groups, starting at 17:00. Athletes attaining a mark of at least 13.20 metres ( Q ) or at least the 12 best performers ( q ) qualified for the final.

Rank	Group	Name	Nationality	Round			Mark	Notes
Rank	Group	Name	Nationality	1	2	3	Mark	Notes
1	A	Maja Åskag	Sweden	x	12.77	13.48	13.48	Q
2	A	Tessy Ebosele	Spain	13.19	13.47		13.47	Q
3	B	Sohane Aucagos	France	12.84	x	13.12	13.12	q, NU20R
4	A	Saly Sarr	Senegal	x	13.06	12.81	13.06	q
5	A	Darja Sopova	Latvia	x	13.03	x	13.03	q
6	B	Valeriya Volovlikova	Authorised Neutral Athletes	13.01	12.82	x	13.01	q
7	B	Ackelia Smith	Jamaica	12.90	12.99	12.70	12.99	q
8	A	Sotiria Rapti	Greece	12.43	12.88	12.93	12.93	q
9	B	Greta Brugnolo	Italy	12.62	x	12.91	12.91	q
10	A	Alexia Dospin	Romania	12.90	12.88	12.45	12.90	q
11	A	Estrella Lobo	Colombia	12.57	x	12.88	12.88	q
12	B	Winnie Chepngetich Bii	Kenya	12.77	12.39	11.97	12.77	q, PB
13	B	Teodora Boberić	Serbia	12.46	12.76	x	12.76	
14	A	Veronika Skalická	Czech Republic	12.44	12.72	12.11	12.72	
15	B	Alyona Chass	Ukraine	x	x	12.64	12.64	
16	A	Anna Kostenko	Ukraine	12.61	x	12.32	12.61	
17	B	Joanna Mosiek	Poland	12.54	12.44	12.60	12.60	
18	B	Ioana Colibăşanu	Romania	x	x	12.55	12.55	
19	B	Vivica Ifeoma Silva	Brazil	12.51	12.45	x	12.51	
20	A	Francesca Orsatti	Italy	12.50	12.45	12.48	12.50	
21	B	Marieta Minasyan	Armenia	11.90	12.37	12.08	12.37	
	A	Sabrina Zralova	Azerbaijan	x			NM	

=== Final ===
The final was held on 20 August at 14:27.

Rank	Name	Nationality	Round						Mark	Notes
Rank	Name	Nationality	1	2	3	4	5	6	Mark	Notes
1st place, gold medalist(s)	Maja Åskag	Sweden	13.35	13.38	13.63	13.56	13.43	13.75	13.75	
2nd place, silver medalist(s)	Tessy Ebosele	Spain	13.06	x	13.10	13.42	13.63	13.06	13.63	PB
3rd place, bronze medalist(s)	Darja Sopova	Latvia	12.92	13.33	13.34	13.42	13.43	13.60	13.60	
4	Sohane Aucagos	France	13.07	13.21	13.13	x	13.42	13.54	13.54	
5	Valeriya Volovlikova	Authorised Neutral Athletes	12.99	13.38	x	x	13.21	x	13.38	
6	Greta Brugnolo	Italy	13.13	12.77	12.62	x	12.47	12.93	13.13	
7	Alexia Dospin	Romania	13.10	12.80	12.26	12.52	x	x	13.10	
8	Saly Sarr	Senegal	12.76	12.93	x	x	x	12.55	12.93	
9	Ackelia Smith	Jamaica	12.39	12.91	12.85				12.91	
10	Sotiria Rapti	Greece	12.82	12.83	12.80				12.83	
11	Estrella Lobo	Colombia	x	12.60	x				12.60	
12	Winnie Chepngetich Bii	Kenya	x	12.47	12.39				12.47	
