= 2018 IAAF World U20 Championships – Women's triple jump =

Women's triple jump at the 2018 World U20 Championships
- Venue: Ratina Stadium
- Dates: 14 July (qualification); 15 July (final)
- Competitors: 25 from 20 nations
- Winning distance: 14.18 m

Medalists
gold medal	Aleksandra Nacheva	Bulgaria
silver medal	Mirieli Santos	Brazil
bronze medal	Davisleydi Velazco	Cuba

The women's triple jump at the 2018 IAAF World U20 Championships was held at Ratina Stadium on 14 and 15 July.

== Records ==
Standing records prior to the 2018 IAAF World U20 Championships in Athletics
World U20 Record	Tereza Marinova (BUL)	14.62	Sydney, Australia	25 August 1996
Championship Record	Tereza Marinova (BUL)	14.62	Sydney, Australia	25 August 1996
World U20 Leading	Aleksandra Nacheva (BUL)	14.00	Sofia, Bulgaria	17 June 2018

== Results ==
=== Qualification ===
The qualification round took place on 14 July, in two groups, with both groups starting at 10:00. Athletes attaining a mark of at least 13.20 metres ( Q ) or at least the 12 best performers ( q ) qualified for the final.

Rank	Group	Name	Nationality	Round			Mark	Notes
Rank	Group	Name	Nationality	1	2	3	Mark	Notes
1	A	Aleksandra Nacheva	Bulgaria	13.17	13.68		13.68	Q
2	A	Mirieli Santos	Brazil	13.13	13.60		13.60	Q, PB
3	B	Rūta Kate Lasmane	Latvia	13.48			13.48	Q, NU20R
4	B	Eva Pepelnak	Slovenia	13.31			13.31	Q
5	B	Davisleydi Velazco	Cuba	x	13.04	13.29	13.29	Q
6	A	Georgiana Iuliana Anitei	Romania	13.24			13.24	Q
7	B	Diana Adasko	Authorised Neutral Athletes	13.14	12.76	13.07	13.14	q
8	A	Jasmine Moore	United States	x	12.95	13.08	13.08	q
9	A	Victoria Josse	France	12.60	12.83	13.03	13.03	q
10	A	Li Yu	China	13.03	12.79	12.75	13.03	q, PB
11	B	Pan Youqi	China	x	12.38	13.03	13.03	q
12	B	Esra Yılmaz	Turkey	x	12.90	12.99	12.99	q
13	A	Charisma Taylor	Bahamas	x	12.70	12.97	12.97	PB
14	B	Safiatou Faty	France	x	12.86	12.78	12.86	
15	A	Camilla Vigato	Italy	12.86	12.50	12.71	12.86	
16	B	Ada Koistinen	Finland	x	12.80	12.15	12.80	
17	B	Lexi Ellis	United States	12.72	12.63	12.49	12.72	
18	B	Lotavia Brown	Jamaica	12.62	12.02	12.72	12.72	
19	A	Fatima Koné	Sweden	12.53	12.07	12.45	12.53	
20	A	Suresh Priyadarshini	India	x	12.50	12.35	12.50	
21	B	Ariana Kuzmanova	Bulgaria	12.33	12.34	x	12.34	
22	B	Diana Ana Maria Ion	Romania	x	12.31	11.13	12.31	
23	A	Gloria Mbaika Mulei	Kenya	12.29	x	x	12.29	
24	A	Mariya Adamchuk	Ukraine	11.72	11.90	11.72	11.90	
	A	Chiaki Kawazoe	Japan	x	x	x	NM	

=== Final ===
The final was held on 15 July at 14:03.

Rank	Name	Nationality	Round						Mark	Notes
Rank	Name	Nationality	1	2	3	4	5	6	Mark	Notes
1st place, gold medalist(s)	Aleksandra Nacheva	Bulgaria	x	14.18	13.62 w	–	–	–	14.18	WU20L
2nd place, silver medalist(s)	Mirieli Santos	Brazil	13.30	x	12.95	13.12	13.81	12.31	13.81	PB
3rd place, bronze medalist(s)	Davisleydi Velazco	Cuba	13.53	13.78	13.75	x	13.56	x	13.78	
4	Eva Pepelnak	Slovenia	13.05	13.10	13.42	13.40	x	13.68	13.68	PB
5	Rūta Kate Lasmane	Latvia	x	13.54	13.30	13.45	13.26	13.22	13.54	NU20R
6	Georgiana Iuliana Anitei	Romania	x	13.04	13.33	13.22	13.46	x	13.46	SB
7	Pan Youqi	China	13.01	13.22	13.09	13.13	13.27	x	13.27	PB
8	Esra Yılmaz	Turkey	12.78	13.24	13.22	x	x	12.99	13.24	
9	Diana Adasko	Authorised Neutral Athletes	x	12.96	13.14 w				13.14 w	
10	Jasmine Moore	United States	13.09	13.06	x				13.09	
11	Li Yu	China	x	13.04	x				13.04	PB
12	Victoria Josse	France	12.59	13.03	x				13.03	
