= 2021 European Athletics U23 Championships – Men's decathlon =

Men's decathlon at the 2021 European Athletics U23 Championships
- Venue: Kadriorg Stadium, Tallinn
- Dates: 10–11 July
- Competitors: 20 from 13 nations
- Winning points: 8142

Medalists
gold medal	Andreas Bechmann	Germany
silver medal	Sven Roosen	Netherlands
bronze medal	Markus Rooth	Norway

The men's decathlon event at the 2021 European Athletics U23 Championships was held in Tallinn, Estonia, at Kadriorg Stadium on 10 and 11 July.

== Records ==
Prior to the competition, the records were as follows:

European U23 record	Niklas Kaul (GER)	8691	Doha, Qatar	4 October 2019
Championship U23 record	Niklas Kaul (GER)	8572	Gävle, Sweden	14 July 2019

== Results ==
=== Final standings ===
The highest mark recorded in each event is highlighted in yellow

Rank	Athlete	Nationality	100m	LJ	SP	HJ	400m	110m H	DT	PV	JT	1500m	Points	Notes
1st place, gold medalist(s)	Andreas Bechmann	Germany	10.91	7.72	15.81	2.02	47.90	15.51	42.51	4.80	55.02	4:40.44	8142	EU23L
2nd place, silver medalist(s)	Sven Roosen	Netherlands	10.85	7.44	14.75	1.87	47.27	14.33	41.97	4.30	58.95	4:25.38	8056	PB
3rd place, bronze medalist(s)	Markus Rooth	Norway	11.19	7.25	13.00	1.93	49.46	14.61	47.31	4.90	59.53	4:36.30	7967	NU23R
4	Dario Dester	Italy	10.97	7.44	13.16	1.93	47.93	14.33	38.97	4.90	53.14	4:32.53	7936	NU23R
5	Baptiste Thiery	France	10.90	7.15	11.90	1.93	48.00	14.93	39.32	5.60	48.64	4:28.20	7915	PB
6	Fran Bonifačić	Croatia	11.51	7.38	14.59	1.93	51.61	14.86	42.35	4.80	58.03	4:33.46	7760	NR
7	Edgaras Benkunskas	Lithuania	11.32	7.03	14.16	1.93	49.81	14.42	40.82	4.60	66.99	4:55.87	7733	PB
8	Sven Jansons	Netherlands	10.80	7.50	12.20	1.99	48.54	14.81	38.69	4.60	46.39	4:31.94	7705	
9	Nils Laserich	Germany	11.06	7.58	14.25	1.96	48.03	15.65	42.69	4.00	56.05	4:39.70	7691	PB
10	Bruno Comín	Spain	11.16	7.33	12.86	1.96	49.42	14.66	42.08	4.80	47.23	4:35.77	7688	PB
11	Finley Gaio	Switzerland	10.66	7.58	11.99	1.87	48.49	13.78	36.40	4.60	42.53	4:58.43	7505	
12	Makenson Gletty	France	10.92	7.15	16.36	1.90	51.77	14.30	42.03	4.50	53.08	5:38.17	7446	
13	Edgar Campre	Portugal	10.85	7.09	12.06	1.87	48.74	14.63	43.01	4.60	44.10	4:51.59	7422	
14	Manuel Dias	Portugal	11.08	7.13	12.74	1.84	49.68	15.35	39.54	4.60	49.62	4:31.49	7400	PB
15	Antonios Andreoglou	Greece	11.15	6.63	13.44	1.90	50.10	15.28	40.76	4.60	50.94	4:46.08	7304	
16	Fabian Amherd	Switzerland	11.53	6.73	13.27	1.93	48.88	15.03	34.21	4.20	53.72	4:21.88	7297	
17	Christian Gundersen	Denmark	11.12	6.62	13.04	1.90	49.04	15.22	38.62	4.40	51.36	4:37.82	7296	
18	Lorenzo Modugno	Italy	11.94	6.59	12.90	2.08	52.38	15.89	37.43	4.70	55.42	4:22.47	7269	
19	Angelos Tzanis Andreoglou	Greece	11.02	7.19	12.33	1.87	DQ	15.08	34.57	4.50	49.88	4:49.18	6394	
	Carl Af Forselles	Sweden	11.08	7.17	DNS								DNF	
