= Sven Jansons =

Dutch athlete

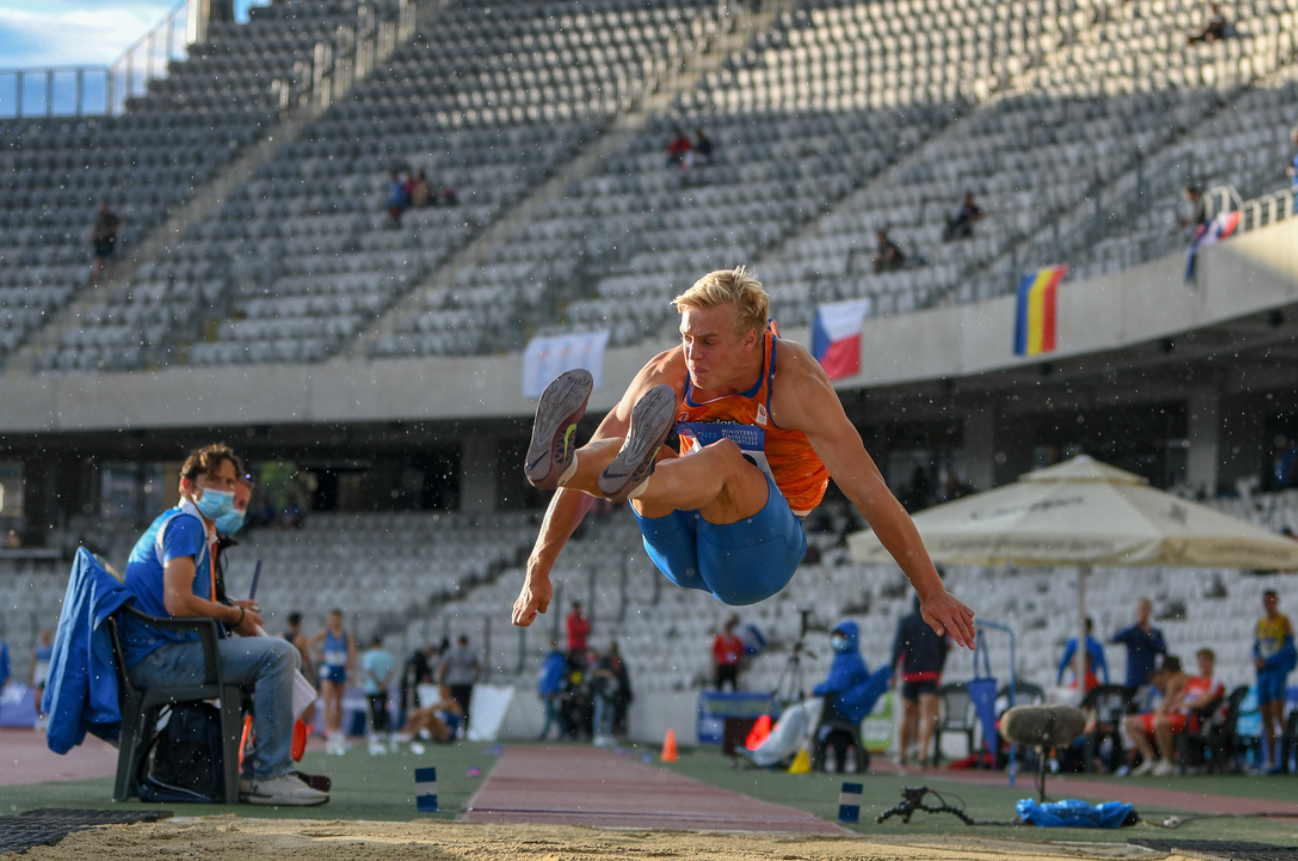

Personal information
- Nationality: Dutch
- Born: 19 July 2001 (age 24)

Sport
- Sport: Athletics

Achievements and titles
- Personal best(s): Decathlon: 7850 (Götzis, 2024); Heptathlon 6025 (Apeldoorn, 2024)
Medal record
Men's athletics
Representing the Netherlands
European U18 Championships
Bronze medal – third place	2018 Győr	Decathlon

Sven Jansons (born 19 July 2001) is a Dutch track and field athlete. He is a national champion in long jump and indoor heptathlon.

== Career ==
From 2018 he trained full-time at the Papendal National Sports Center. That year, he won bronze at the 2018 European Athletics U18 Championships in the boys decathlon.

Jansons finished ninth in the at the 2019 European Athletics U20 Championships. He competed at the 2021 European U23 Athletics Championships in Tallinn. He won the long jump at the 2021 Dutch Athletics Championships in Breda.

He was selected for the European U23 Athletics Championships in Espoo in July 2023. However, he could not participate due to injury.

At the Dutch national championships in Apeldoorn in February 2024 he set a new personal best for the indoor heptathlon with a score of 6025 points. This placed him fifth in the Dutch all-time rankings. He was selected to compete in the heptathlon at the 2024 World Athletics Championships in Glasgow in March 2024 in which he finished seventh overall. In Götzis (May 2024) he set a new personal best for decathlon with a tally of 7850 points.
