= Jessica Kähärä =

Finnish athlete

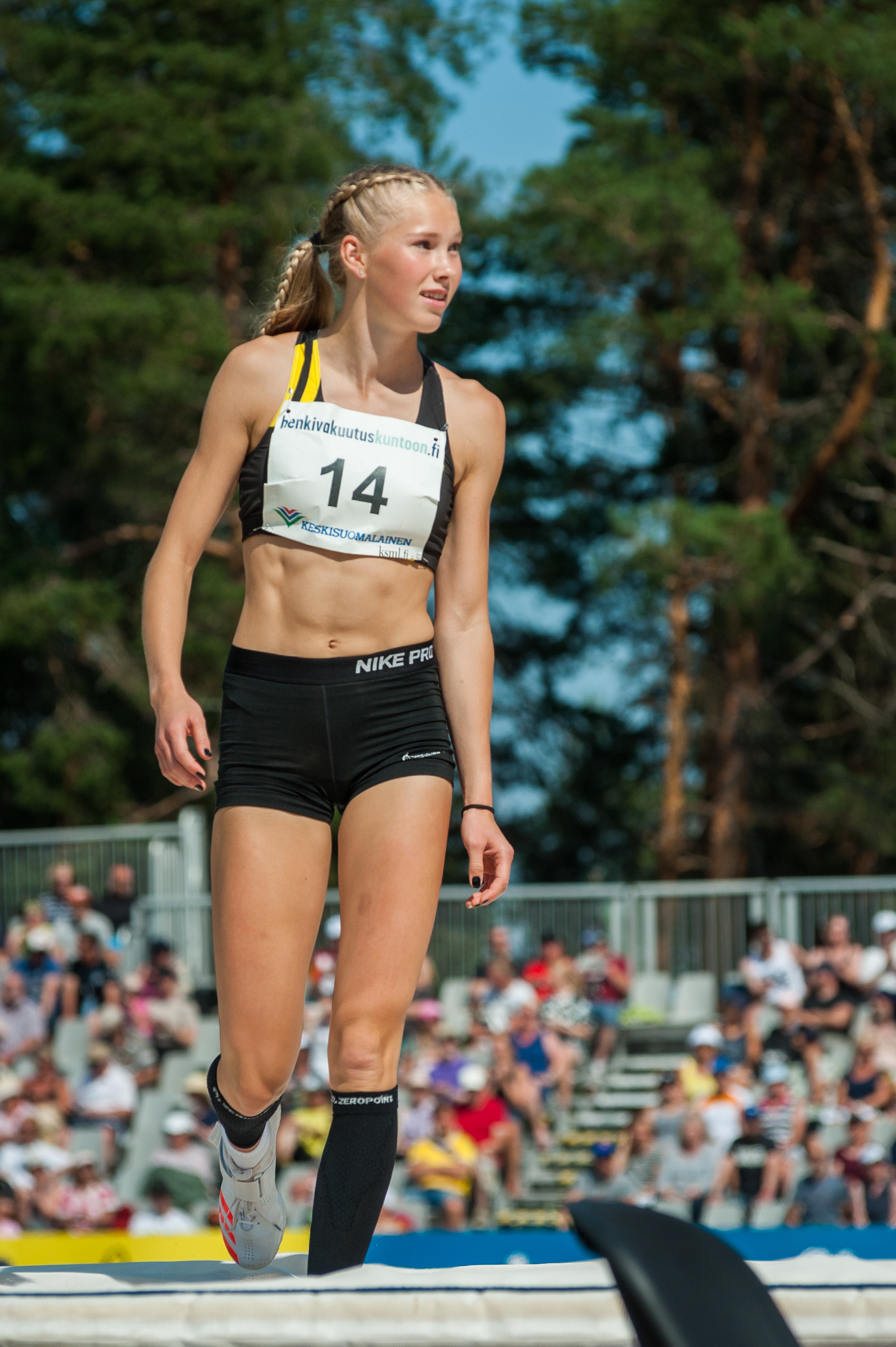
- Kähärä in 2018

Personal information
- Born: 1 August 2001 (age 24)

Sport
- Country: Finland
- Sport: Athletics
- Event(s): High jump, long jump, triple jump
- Club: Mikkeli Kilpa-Veikkou

Achievements and titles
- Personal best(s): High Jump: 1.90m (Kuopio, 2019) NU20R; Long Jump: 6.47m (Jyväskylä, 2023); Triple Jump: 13.87m (Kuortane, 2023)
Medal record
Women's athletics
Representing Finland
European U23 Championships
Bronze medal – third place	2023 Espoo	Triple jump
Youth Olympic Games
Bronze medal – third place	2018 Buenos Aires	High jump
European Youth Olympic Festival
Bronze medal – third place	2017 Győr	High jump
European U18 Championships
Silver medal – second place	2018 Győr	High jump
Bronze medal – third place	2018 Győr	Triple jump

Jessica Kähärä (born 1 August 2001) is a multi-event track and field athlete from Finland. She has won Finnish national titles in the long jump and high jump. She competed in the long jump at the 2025 World Athletics Indoor Championships.

== Career ==
Kähärä was a bronze medalist in the high jump at the European Youth Olympics in Győr, Hungary.

She won silver in the high jump and bronze in the triple jump at the 2018 European Athletics U18 Championships in Győr, Hungary. That year, she was also a bronze medalist in the high jump at the Athletics at the 2018 Summer Youth Olympics in Buenos Aires.

She won the senior national title high jump title at the Finnish Athletics Championships in February 2019, and broke the Finnish national under-20 record, with a 1.90m clearance. She competed amongst senior athletes in the high jump at the 2019 European Athletics Indoor Championships in Glasgow. However, a succession of injuries over the next years, including ankle surgery that ruled her out of much of the 2021 season, led her to move away from the high jump discipline.

She won the Finnish national title in the long jump at the 2023 Finnish indoor national championships in February 2023. She won bronze in the triple jump at the 2023 European Athletics U23 Championships in Espoo, Finland. She also competed at the 2023 University Games in Chengdu, China in August 2023.

In June 2024, she won the national title at the Finnish Athletics Championships with a jump of 6.47 metres. She was named in the Finnish team for the 2024 European Athletics Championships in Rome.

She placed ninth in the long jump at the 2025 World Athletics Indoor Championships in Nanjing, China, with a best jump of 6.44 metres.

== Personal life ==
A member of the Mikkeli Kilpa-Veikkou Athletics club in Mikkeli, Kähärä studies physical education and social sciences at the University of Jyväskylä.
