= Ricky Petrucciani =

Swiss sprinter (born 2000)

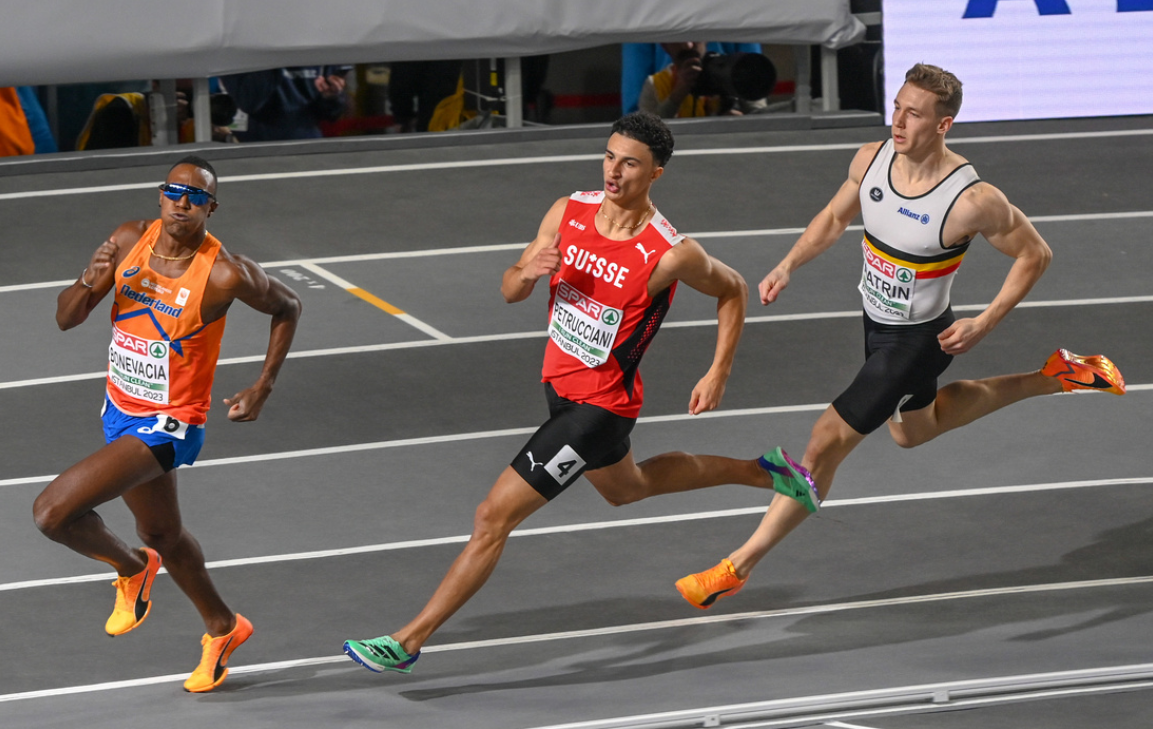
- Petrucciani (centre) in 2023

Personal information
- Born: 30 June 2000 (age 26) Locarno, Ticino, Switzerland
- Education: Collegio Papio
- Height: 1.93 m (6 ft 4 in)
- Weight: 76 kg (168 lb)

Sport
- Country: Switzerland
- Sport: Athletics
- Event: 400 metres
- Club: LC Zürich
- Coached by: Flavio Zberg

Achievements and titles
- Personal bests: 400 m: 45.02 (Tallinn 2021) CR; Indoors; 400 m: 46.27 (Magglingen 2023)
Medal record
Men's athletics
Representing Switzerland
European Championships
| Silver medal – second place | 2022 Munich | 400 m |
European U23 Championships
| Gold medal – first place | 2021 Tallinn | 400 m |
European U20 Championships
| Bronze medal – third place | 2019 Borås | 400 m |

Ricky Petrucciani (Italian pronunciation: [petrutˈtʃaːni]; born 30 June 2000) is a Swiss sprinter specialising in the 400 metres. He won a gold medal at the 2021 European U23 Championships and a silver medal at the 2022 European Championships in the 400 m category. He also reached the semifinals of the 2020 Olympics.

== Early life and background ==
Ricky Petrucciani was born on 30 June 2000 in Locarno, Switzerland to a Brazilian mother and a Swiss father.

He began his athletic career in 2015 when he decided to switch from playing football to athletics. He explained the reason was because he "wanted to train for [himself] and not for a team, [he] wanted to achieve [his] results and not those of a team.”

He started working with Flavio Zberg in 2017 and transferred clubs so that he could train with LC Zürich. His father, Maurizio, acts as his manager. Ricky graduated from Collegio Papio and serves as an ambassador for the Ascona-Locarno region.

== Career ==
=== 2016—2019 ===
Petrucciani claimed several national titles as a junior. He competed in the 400 metres at the 2016 Swiss U18 Championships, came in first place, and was named the champion for that year.

The following year, he collected six more titles at the 2017 Swiss U18 Championships for: the indoor 60 metres, outdoor 100 metres, indoor and outdoor 200 metres, and indoor and outdoor 400 metres.

He added yet another national title to his record in the 100 metres at the 2018 Swiss U20 Championships. He earned two extra titles in the 100 metres and 200 metres at the 2019 Swiss U20 Championships.

=== 2021 ===
He earned a gold medal in the 400 metres at the 2021 European U23 Championships, where he set a new championship record and a personal best of 45.02 that still stands to this day. He also ran the second leg of the 4 × 400 m relay, however, his team did not finish because of a mishap between the Dutch and British athletes that made the third Swiss runner trip during the race. The Swiss lost their lead within moments.

=== 2023 ===
He was selected for the 2023 World Championships and ran the third leg of the mixed 4 × 400 m relay. But, ultimately, the Swiss team failed to advance to the final round. Later, he withdrew from his individual event in the 400 metres due to a hamstring problem that had not healed from the previous day's relay race. He did not want to injure himself, as well, ahead of Weltklasse Zürich, the Galà dei Castelli, and the 2024 Olympics.

== Achievements ==
=== Personal bests ===
- 60 metres indoor – 6.68 (Magglingen 2023)

- 100 metres – 10.24 (+0.2 m/s, Bern 2021)
- 200 metres – 20.72 (+0.3 m/s, Bern 2021)
  - 200 metres indoor – 21.50 (Magglingen 2021)
- 400 metres – 45.02 (Tallinn 2021) CR
  - 400 metres indoor – 46.27 (Magglingen 2023)

=== International competitions ===
| Year | Competition | Venue | Position | Event | Time | Notes |
Representing Switzerland
| 2016 | European Youth Championships | Tbilisi, Georgia | 21st (h) | 400 m | 49.75 | |
| 2016 | European Youth Championships | Tbilisi, Georgia | 11th (h) | Medley relay | 2:00.52 | |
| 2017 | European U20 Championships | Grosseto, Italy | 10th (sf) | 400 m | 47.41 | |
| 2017 | European U20 Championships | Grosseto, Italy | 6th | 4 × 400 m relay | 3:11.67 | |
| 2018 | World U20 Championships | Tampere, Finland | 18th (sf) | 400 m | 47.39 | |
| 2018 | World U20 Championships | Tampere, Finland | 9th (h) | 4 × 400 m relay | 3:09.48 | |
| 2018 | European Championships | Berlin, Germany | – (h) | 4 × 400 m relay | DQ | |
| 2019 | European Indoor Championships | Glasgow, United Kingdom | 16th (h) | 400 m | 47.83 | |
| 2019 | European U20 Championships | Borås, Sweden | 3rd | 400 m | 46.34 | |
| 2021 | European Indoor Championships | Toruń, Poland | 7th (sf) | 400 m | 46.72 | |
| 2021 | European U23 Championships | Tallinn, Estonia | 1st | 400 m | 45.02 | CR |
| 2021 | European U23 Championships | Tallinn, Estonia | — (f) | 4 × 400 m relay | DNF | |
| 2021 | Olympic Games | Tokyo, Japan | 14th (sf) | 400 m | 45.26 | |
| 2022 | World Championships | Eugene, United States | 34th (h) | 400 m | 46.60 | |
| 2022 | European Championships | Munich, Germany | 2nd | 400 m | 45.03 | |
| 2022 | European Championships | Munich, Germany | – (h) | 4 × 400 m relay | DNF | |
| 2023 | European Indoor Championships | Istanbul, Turkey | 20th (h) | 400 m | 47.32 | |
| 2023 | European Team Championships First Division | Chorzów, Poland | 8th | 4 × 400 m relay mixed | 3:14.22 | NR |
| 2023 | World Championships | Budapest, Hungary | — | 400 m | DNS | |
| 2023 | World Championships | Budapest, Hungary | 11th (h) | 4 × 400 m relay mixed | 3:14.38 | (44.61 split) |
| 2024 | European Championships | Rome, Italy | 14th (sf) | 400 m | 45.47 | |
| 2024 | European Championships | Rome, Italy | – | 4 × 400 m relay | DQ | |
| 2025 | European Indoor Championships | Apeldoorn, Netherlands | 20th (h) | 400 m | 46.79 | |
| 2026 | European Championships | Birmingham, United Kingdom | 15th (h) | 400 m | 46.14 | |
| 2026 | European Championships | Birmingham, United Kingdom | 8th | 4 × 400 m relay | 3:02.78 | |

=== National titles ===
- Swiss Athletics Championships (3)
  - 400 metres — 2019, 2020, 2021
- Swiss Indoor Athletics Championships (4)
  - 60 metres — 2022
  - 400 metres — 2018, 2019, 2020

== See also ==
- List of Swiss records in athletics
- Switzerland at the Olympics
