= Sven Roosen =

Dutch decathlete (born 2001)

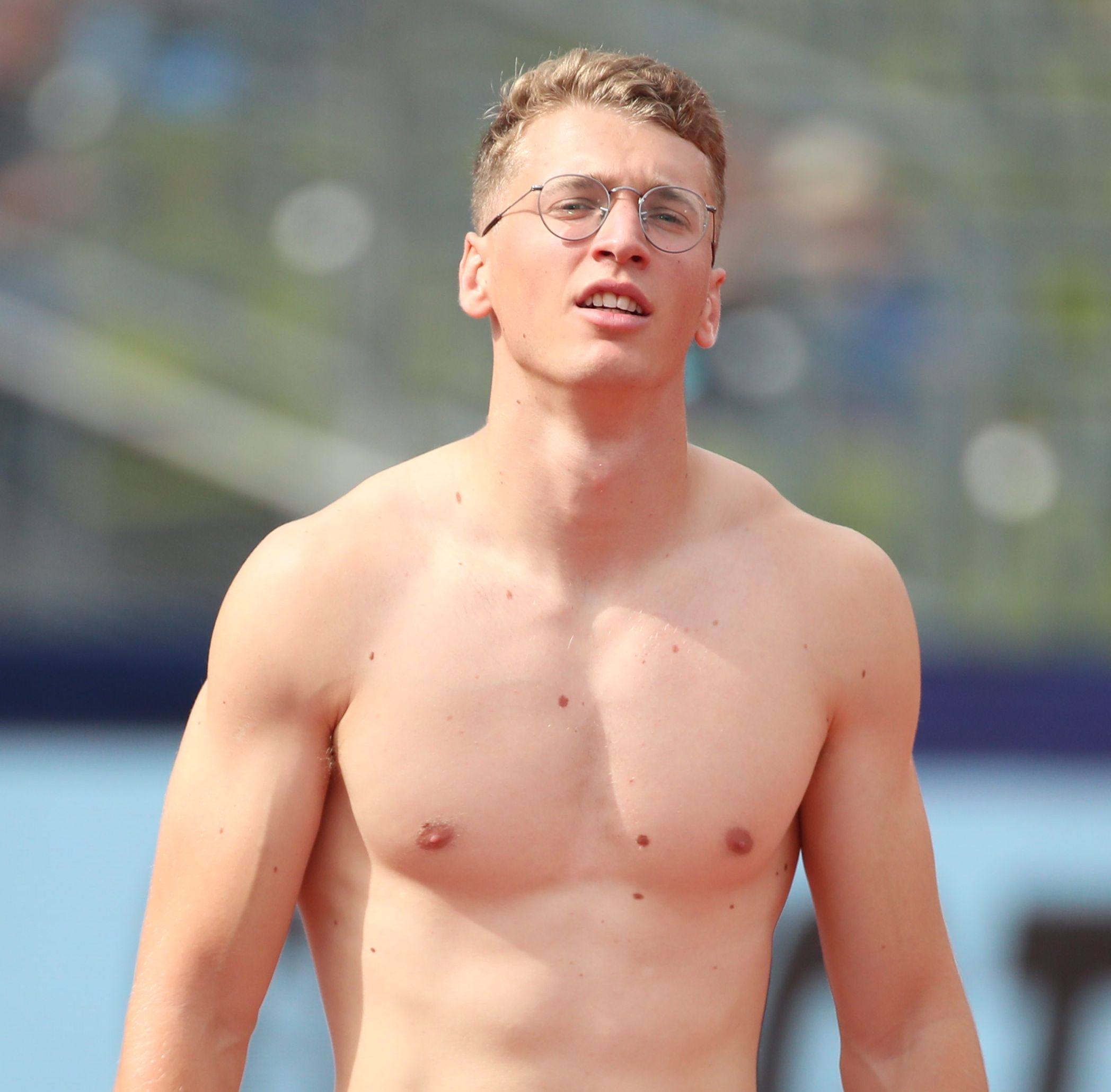
- Roosen in 2022

Personal information
- Nationality: Dutch
- Born: 27 July 2001 (age 24) Eindhoven, Netherlands

Sport
- Sport: Athletics
- Event: Decathlon

Achievements and titles
- Personal best: Decathlon: 8,607 (2024)
Medal record
Men's athletics
Representing Netherlands
European U23 Championships
Bronze medal – third place	2023 Espoo	Decathlon
Silver medal – second place	2021 Tallinn	Decathlon

Sven Roosen (born 27 July 2001) is a Dutch decathlete. He is a two-time medalist at the European Athletics U23 Championships, winning the silver medal in 2021 and the bronze medal in 2023. He finished fourth overall in the decathlon at the 2024 Paris Olympics.

== Career ==
In 2021, he won the silver medal in the decathlon at the European U23 Championship in Tallinn, Estonia. This was the first time he scored over 8000 points for the decathlon.

He became Dutch national champion in the decathlon in Apeldoorn in June 2022 at the 2022 Dutch Athletics Championships. Later that summer, he finished in tenth place at the 2022 European Athletics Championships in Munich, Germany, in what was his debut appearance at a senior major competition.

In July 2023, he won the bronze medal at the European U23 Athletics Championships in the decathlon in Espoo, Finland.

He scored a personal best decathlon points tally of 8511 as he finished as runner-up at the Hypo-Meeting in Götzis, Austria in May 2024, also achieving the qualifying standard for the 2024 Paris Olympics. Competing at the Olympic Games in August 2024, he achieved fourth place overall in a new personal best and national record of 8607 points. He finished third at the decathlon at the Decastar meeting in Talence, France in September 2024. Also in 2024, he finished fourth overall in the 2024 World Athletics Combined Events Tour.

In September 2025, he competed in the decathlon at the 2025 World Athletics Championships in Tokyo, Japan but was unable to finish the competition.

== Personal bests ==
Information from World Athletics profile unless otherwise noted.

=== Outdoor ===
As of 2 June 2026

Event	Performance	Location	Date	Points
Decathlon	—N/a	Paris	2–3 August 2024	8,607 points
100 metres	10.49 (+1.2 m/s)	Götzis	18 May 2024	977 points
Long jump	7.56 m (24 ft 9 1/2 in) (-0.6 m/s)	Paris	2 August 2024	950 points
Shot put	15.10 m (49 ft 6 1/4 in)	Paris	2 August 2024	796 points
High jump	1.91 m (6 ft 3 in)	Götzis	18 May 2024	723 points
400 metres	46.40	Paris	2 August 2024	998 points
110 metres hurdles	13.96 (+0.2 m/s)	Breda	20 July 2024	980 points
Discus throw	46.88 m (153 ft 9 1/2 in)	Paris	3 August 2024	806 points
Pole vault	5.00 m (16 ft 4 3/4 in)	Leuven	16 August 2025	910 points
Javelin throw	65.07 m (213 ft 5 3/4 in)	Götzis	31 May 2026	814 points
1500 metres	4:18.43	Munich	16 August 2022	822 points
Virtual Best Performance				8,776 points

Event	Performance	Location	Date
150 metres	15.62 (+1.6 m/s)	Lisse	7 May 2022
200 metres	21.31 (-0.8 m/s)	Hengelo	29 June 2024
300 metres	32.96	Lisse	13 May 2023
800 metres	1:58.80	Utrecht	3 August 2018
400 metres hurdles	51.48	Schothorst	12 September 2020

=== Indoor ===
As of 24 June 2025

Event	Performance	Location	Date	Points
Heptathlon	—N/a	Apeldoorn	13–14 February 2021	5,706 points
60 metres	7.01	Leverkusen	3 February 2024	879 points
Long jump	7.12 m (23 ft 4 1/4 in)	Apeldoorn	8 February 2020	842 points
Shot put	14.59 m (47 ft 10 1/4 in)	Apeldoorn	26 February 2022	769 points
High jump	1.90 m (6 ft 2 3/4 in)	Apeldoorn	13 February 2021	714 points
60 metres hurdles	7.93	Apeldoorn	27 February 2022	999 points
Pole vault	4.35 m (14 ft 3 1/4 in)	Apeldoorn	14 February 2021	716 points
1000 metres	2:34.52	Apeldoorn	5 February 2023	935 points
Virtual Best Performance				5,850 points

== Personal life ==
He is from Eindhoven, in the province of North Brabant in the Netherlands. His uncle Marcel Dost is also a decathlete, and participated in the 1996 Olympic Decathlon in Atlanta.
