= Gore Mountain =

Gore Mountain may refer to:

- Gore Mountain (New York)
- Gore Mountain (ski resort), New York
- Gore Mountain (Vermont)
