= Maja Åskag =

Swedish athletics competitor

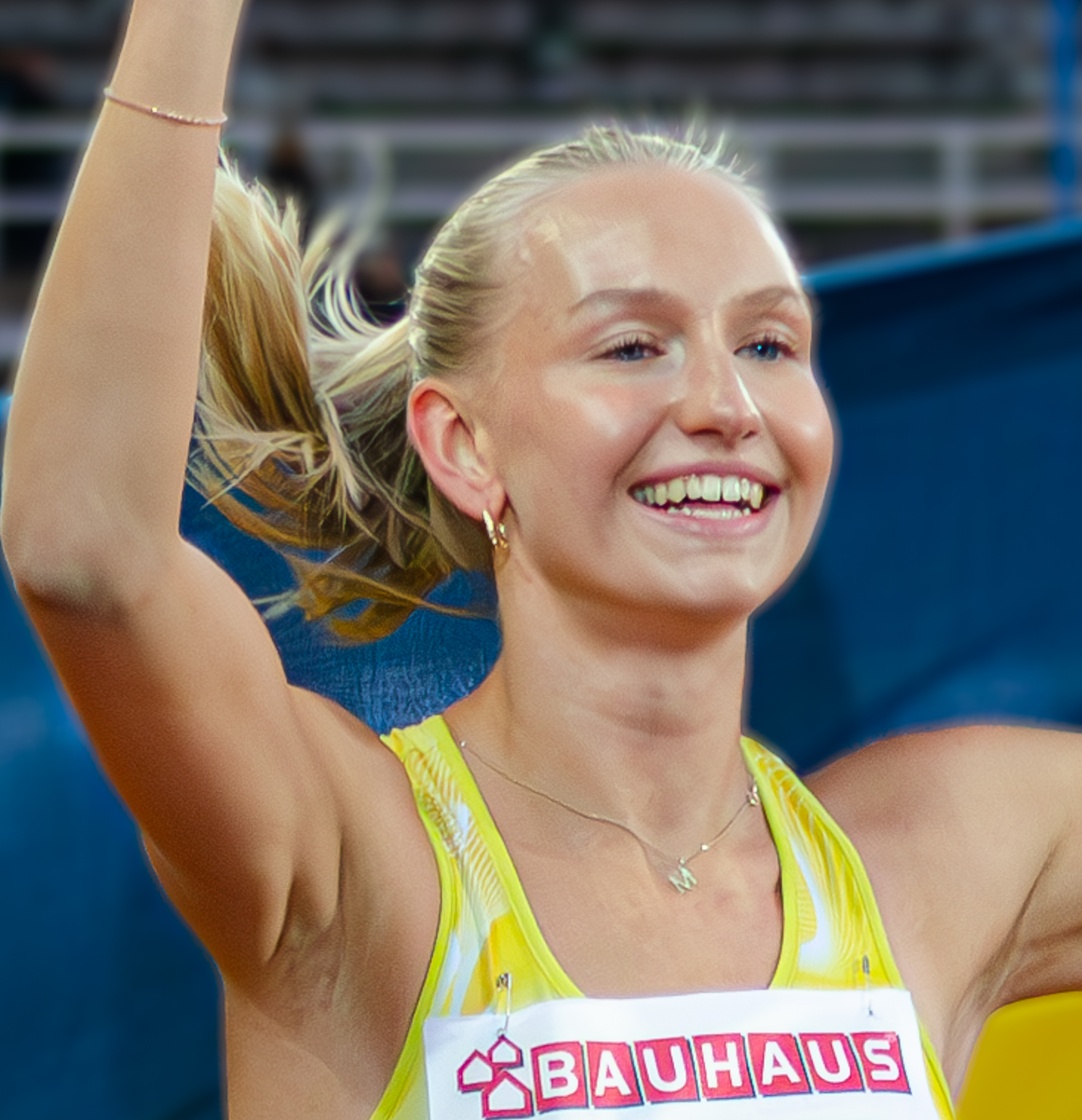
- Åskag during Finland-Sweden athletics international 2023.

Personal information
- National team: Sweden
- Born: 18 December 2002 (age 23) Eskilstuna, Sweden

Sport
- Country: Sweden
- Sport: Athletics
- Event(s): Triple Jump, long jump
- Club: Råby-Rekarne FIF

Achievements and titles
- Personal best(s): Long jump: 6.75 m (2023); Triple jump: 14.27 m (2023)
Medal record
Women's athletics
Representing Sweden
World U20 Championships
Gold medal – first place	2021 Nairobi	Long jump
Gold medal – first place	2021 Nairobi	Triple jump
European U20 Championships
Gold medal – first place	2021 Tallinn	Long jump
Gold medal – first place	2021 Tallinn	Triple jump
European U23 Championships
Silver medal – second place	2023 Espoo	Triple jump
Silver medal – second place	2023 Espoo	Long jump
European Youth Olympic Festival
Gold medal – first place	2019 Baku	Triple jump

Maja Åskag (born 18 December 2002) is a Swedish athlete who specializes in the triple jump and long jump. She was the gold medallist in both events at the World U20 Championships in Nairobi 2021, as well as at the European U20 Championships in Tallinn the same year, having completed a jumps 'double double'.

Former handball player Tomas Svensson is her paternal uncle and his son football player Max Svensson is her cousin.
