= Ludovic Oucéni =

French sprinter

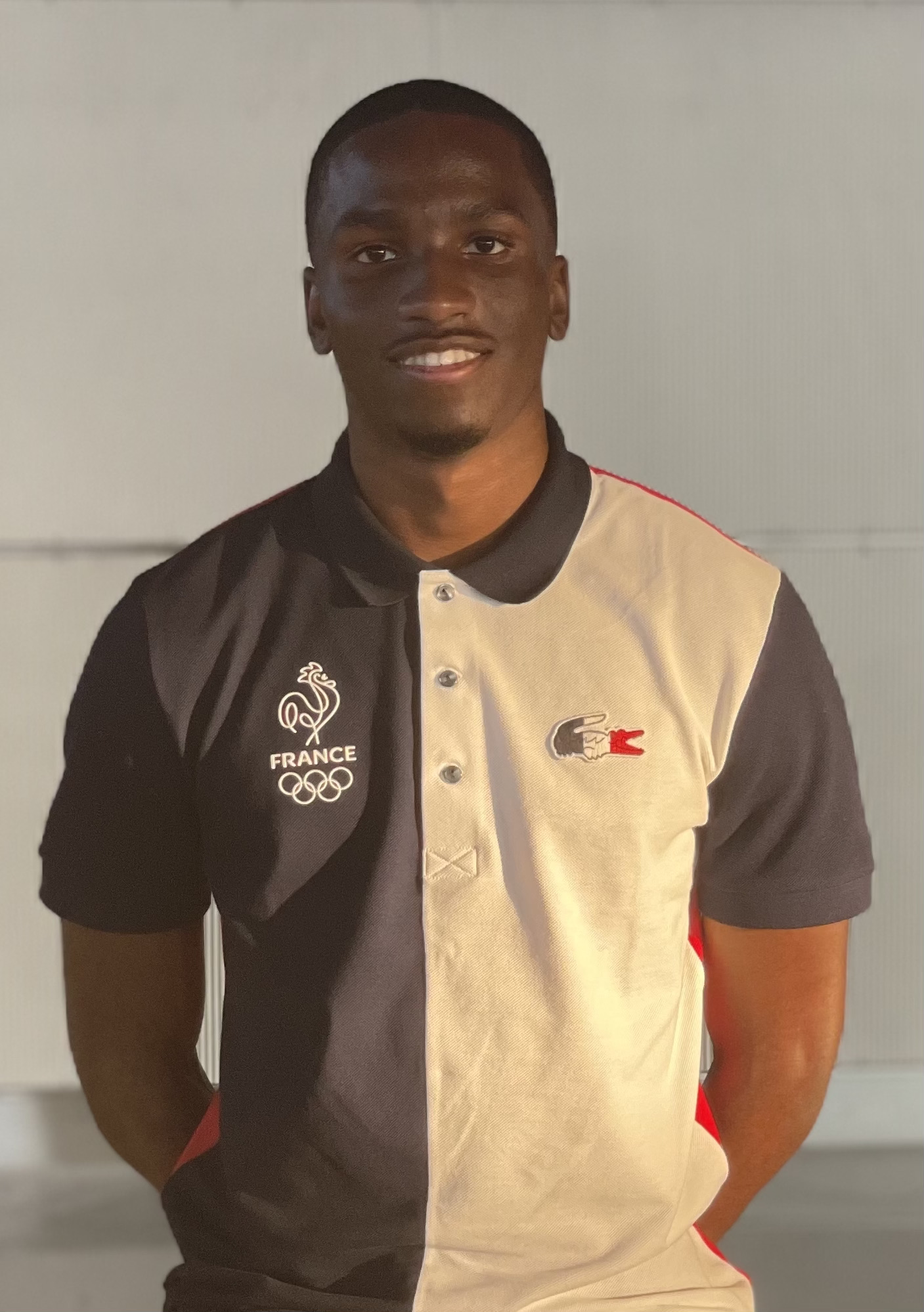
- Oucéni in 2021

Personal information
- Born: 1 February 2001 (age 25) Villepinte, Seine-Saint-Denis, France
- Height: 179 cm (5 ft 10 in)
- Weight: 75 kg (165 lb)

Sport
- Country: France
- Sport: Athletics
- Event: 400 metres
- Club: Pierrefitte Multi Athlon Villetaneuse
- Coached by: Marc Vecchio

Achievements and titles
- Personal bests: Outdoor; 400 m: 45.87 (Cergy-Pontoise 2023); Indoor; 400 m: 46.40 (Eaubonne 2022)
Medal record
Men's athletics
Representing France
European U23 Championships
Gold medal – first place	2021 Tallinn	4×400 m relay

Ludovic Oucéni (born 1 February 2001) is a French sprinter who specializes in the 400 metres. He competed in the men's 4 × 400 metres relay event at the 2020 Summer Olympics.
