= Gregor Grahovac =

Slovenian athlete (born 2000)

Personal information
- Born: 24 April 2000 (age 25) Ljubljana, Slovenia
- Occupation: Athlete
- Height: 1.87 m (6 ft 2 in)
- Weight: 78 kg (172 lb)

Sport
- Country: Slovenia
- Event: 400 m
- Club: AD MASS
- Coached by: No coach

Gregor Grahovac (born 24 April 2000) is a Slovenian athlete born in Ljubljana.

== Biography ==
A member of the Mass Ljubljana athletic club, multiple national and cup champion, he was a Balkan youth champion in the 400-meter run. With a member relay, he won first place at the Balkan Indoor Championships in Istanbul, where they broke the national record and the record of the Balkan Championships in the 4 × 400 meters. In addition to this record, he also owns several records in several age categories. The biggest success is a bronze medal at the EYOF (European Youth Olympic Festival) in Georgia in the 400-meter run and a place in the finals of the U18 World Championships in Kenya in the 400-meter run, in which he qualified as the only European. In addition, he is a media technician and IAM student.

== Personal best ==
- 100 m - 10.91 +0.2
- 200 m - 21.54 +0.3
- 200 m - 21.28 * +2.4
- 300 m - 33.77
- 400 m - 46.71
- 4 × 100 m - 40.54
- 4 × 400 m - 3:08.56

== Indoor personal best ==
- 60 m - 7.02
- 200 m - 21.78
- 400 m - 47.46
- 4 × 400 m - 3:12.19

== International competitions ==
- 2015 EYOF (European Youth Olympic Festival), Tbilisi (GEO)

400 m (48.56) – final (3rd place) 100-200-300-400 m (2:00.93) – 3rd place

- 2015 5-boj CRO-CZE-HUN-SLO-SVK, Břeclav (CZE)

300 m (34.96) – 2nd place 4 × 300 m / mixed relay (2:33.70) – 2nd place

- 2016 European Championship, Tbilisi (GEO)

400 m (49.74) – qualifications (20th place)

- 2016 BRIXIA, Bressanone (ITA)

400 m (48.77) – 1st place 4 × 100 m (42.82) – 3rd place

- 2016 4-boj CZE-HUN-SLO-SVK, Brno (CZE)

200 m (21.28, +2.4) – 1st place 100-200-300-400 m (1:55.17) – 1st place

- 2017 IAAF World U18 Championships, Nairobi (KEN)

400 m (48.88) – final (8th place)

- 2017 European Team Championships – 2. league, Tel Aviv (ISR)

4 × 400 m (3:08.56) – 1st place

- 2017 European Championships, Grosseto (ITA)

4 × 400 m (3:16.90) – qualifications (11th place)

- 2017 * Balkan Athletics Championships, Istanbul (TUR)

400 m (48.51) – 1st place

- 2017 4-boj CZE-HUN-SLO-SVK /, Miškolc (HUN)

200 m (21.54, +0.3) – 3rd place 100-200-300-400 m (1:55.05) – 2nd place

- 2019 European Team Championships – 2. league, Varaždin (CRO)

4 × 100 m (40.54) – 5th place

- 2019 2019 European Athletics U20 Championships, Borås (SWE)

400 m (47.82) – qualifications (15th place) 4 × 400 m (3:16.81) – 2nd place

- 2019 * Balkan Indoor Athletics Championships, Istanbul (TUR)

400 m (49.21) – 4th place 4 × 400 m (3:20.27) – 2nd place

- 2020 Balkan Indoor Athletics Championships, Istanbul (TUR)

4 × 400 m (3:12.19) – 1st place)

- 2020 3-boj CRO-SLO-SRB, Novo Mesto (SLO)

400 m (47.74) – 1st place 4 × 400 m (3:14.02) – 1st place)

== Recognitions ==
- Athlete of the Year in Pioneers (1. place) 2015
- Athlete of the Year in Juniors (1. place) 2016
- Athlete of the Year in Juniors (1. place) 2017
