= Marissa Damink =

Dutch athlete (born 1995)

Personal information
- Nationality: Dutch
- Born: 24 October 1995 (age 30)

Sport
- Sport: Athletics
- Event: Middle distance running

Achievements and titles
- Personal bests: 800m: 2:01.42 (Leuven, 2024); 1500m: 4:04.37 (Zagreb, 2024); Mile: 4:30.3 (Düsseldorf, 2024); 3000m: 9:02.44 (Apeldoorn, 2024); Nat.champ.1500m indoor 2022, 2024; Nat.champ.1500m 2023, 2024, 2025; Nat.champ.3000m indoor 2024; Nat.champ. short cross 2024; European record road mile (Düsseldorf, 2024)

Marissa Damink (born 24 October 1995) is a Dutch middle distance runner. She has won multiple Dutch national titles over 1500 metres.

== Career ==
In February 2022, she won the Dutch Athletics Indoor Championships in Apeldoorn over 1500 metres. the following year, defending her title at the same event she was runner-up to Maureen Koster. In March 2023, she competed in the European Athletics Indoor Championships in Istanbul over 1500 metres.

In June 2023, she finished tenth in the 1500 metres at the European Team Championships in Silesia. In July 2023, she won the Dutch Athletics Championships 1500 metres in Breda. She finished tenth in the road mile at the 2023 World Athletics Road Running Championships in Riga.

In February 2024, she won the Dutch Athletics Indoor Championship titles in Appeldoorn both over 1500 metres and 3000 metres. In May 2024, she lowered her personal best for the 1500 metres to 4:04.84 in Modena, Italy. In June 2024, she competed at the European Athletics Championships in Rome.

In September, she set a women's European best of 4:30.3 on the Road Mile in Düsseldorf.

Switching to cross country running, she became Dutch champion in December 2024, and participated in the mixed relay at the 2024 European Cross Country Championships. The Dutch team finished 4th.

In February 2025, she was runner-up at the Dutch Indoor Athletics Championships over 3000 metres. She was selected for the 2025 European Athletics Indoor Championships in Apeldoorn in the 1500 metres.

She won the Dutch Athletics Championships over 1500 metres in August 2025. In September 2025, she competed over 1500 metres at the 2025 World Championships in Tokyo, Japan, without advancing to the semi-finals.

== Personal life ==
From Enschede, she was a keen hockey player before focusing on athletics. She attended Eindhoven University of Technology where she studied Humam Technology Interaction (psychology and technology).

She was married in March 2025, changing her name to Damink - van der Meijden.
