= 2026 European Athletics Championships – Men's 400 metres =

Men's 400 metres at the 2026 European Athletics Championships
- Venue: Alexander Stadium
- Location: Birmingham, United Kingdom
- Dates: 10 August 2026 (round 1); 11 August 2026 (semi-finals); 12 August 2026 (final)
- Competitors: 36 (target)
- Winning time: 44.17

Medalists
| gold medal | Matthew Hudson-Smith | Great Britain |
| silver medal | Muhammad Abdallah Kounta | France |
| bronze medal | Jonas Phijffers | Netherlands |

Official Video Highlights

The men's 400 metres at the 2026 European Athletics Championships took place over three rounds at the Alexander Stadium in Birmingham, United Kingdom, from 10 to 12 August 2026.

== Background ==
Records before the 2026 European Athletics Championships
| Record | Athlete (nation) | Time | Location | Date |
|---|---|---|---|---|
| World record | Wayde van Niekerk (RSA) | 43.03 | Rio de Janeiro, Brazil | 14 August 2016 |
| European record | Matthew Hudson-Smith (GBR) | 43.44 | Saint-Denis, France | 7 August 2024 |
| Championship record | Alexander Doom (BEL) | 44.15 | Rome, Italy | 10 June 2024 |
| World leading | Samuel Ogazi (NGR) | 43.38 | Eugene, United States | 12 June 2026 |
| European leading | Matthew Hudson-Smith (GBR) | 44.09 | Paris, France | 28 June 2026 |

== Qualification ==
For the men's 400 metres, the qualification period was from 27 July 2025 to 26 July 2026. Athletes qualified by running the entry standard of 45.25 or faster, by wildcard for the 2024 European Athletics Champion (not used since Alexander Doom chose not to participate), or by their position on the World Athletics Rankings for the event. The target number was 36 athletes.

Qualification standings per 31 July 2026
| QP | CP | Country | Athlete | PB | SB | Status | Details |
|---|---|---|---|---|---|---|---|
| 1 | 1 | Great Britain & N.I. | Matthew Hudson-Smith | 43.44 | 44.09 | Qualified by Entry Standard | 44.09 - Stade Charléty, Paris (FRA) - 28 JUN 2026 |
| 2 | 1 | France | Samuel Vessat | 44.24 | 44.24 | Qualified by Entry Standard | 44.24 - Stadium Municipal, Albi (FRA) - 26 JUL 2026 |
| 3 | 1 | Italy | Edoardo Scotti | 44.45 | 44.96 | Qualified by Entry Standard | 44.45 - National Stadium, Tokyo (JPN) - 14 SEP 2025 |
| 4 | 1 | Hungary | Attila Molnár | 44.47 | 44.47 | Qualified by Entry Standard | 44.47 - Stade Louis II, Monaco (MON) - 10 JUL 2026 |
| 5 | 2 | France | Muhammad Abdallah Kounta | 44.55 | 44.55 | Qualified by Entry Standard | 44.55 - Stadium Municipal, Albi (FRA) - 26 JUL 2026 |
| 6 | 2 | Great Britain & N.I. | Ben Jefferies | 44.66 | 44.66 | Qualified by Entry Standard | 44.66 - Alexander Stadium, Birmingham (GBR) - 21 JUN 2026 |
| 7 | 3 | Great Britain & N.I. | Charlie Dobson | 44.14 | 44.69 | Qualified by Entry Standard | 44.69 - Alexander Stadium, Birmingham (GBR) - 21 JUN 2026 |
| 8 | 1 | Netherlands | Jonas Phijffers | 44.71 | 44.72 | Qualified by Entry Standard | 44.71 - FBK Stadium, Hengelo (NED) - 03 AUG 2025 |
| 9 | 1 | Germany | Jean Paul Bredau | 44.72 | 44.72 | Qualified by Entry Standard | 44.72 - Lohrheidestadion, Wattenscheid, Bochum (GER) - 26 JUL 2026 |
| 10 | 1 | Belgium | Daniel Segers | 44.63 | 44.81 | Qualified by Entry Standard | 44.81 - Mestský Stadion, Ostrava (CZE) - 16 JUN 2026 |
| 11 | 1 | Greece | George John Franks | 44.88 | 44.88 | Qualified by Entry Standard | 44.88 - Un. of Kentucky Outdoor Track Facility, Lexington, KY (USA) - 29 MAY 2026 |
| 12 | 1 | Slovenia | Rok Ferlan | 44.70 | 45.78 | Qualified by Entry Standard | 44.91 - National Stadium, Tokyo (JPN) - 14 SEP 2025 |
| 13 | 3 | France | Yann Spillmann | 44.92 | 44.92 | Qualified by Entry Standard | 44.92 - Stadium Municipal, Albi (FRA) - 26 JUL 2026 |
| 14 | 2 | Belgium | Dylan Borlée | 44.94 | 45.49 | Qualified by Entry Standard | 44.94 - Boudewijnstadion, Bruxelles (BEL) - 22 AUG 2025 |
| 15 | 1 | Poland | Maksymilian Szwed | 44.94 | 44.94 | Qualified by Entry Standard | 44.94 - Miejski Stadion, Opole (POL) - 27 JUN 2026 |
| 16 | 3 | Belgium | Jonathan Sacoor | 44.98 | 45.03 | Qualified by Entry Standard | 45.03 - Stade Jean Delbert, Montreuil (FRA) - 17 JUN 2026 |
| 17 | 2 | Netherlands | Eugene Omalla | 45.03 | 45.03 | Qualified by Entry Standard | 45.03 - FBK Stadium, Hengelo (NED) - 21 JUN 2026 |
| 18 | 2 | Germany | Thorben Finke | 45.08 | 45.08 | Qualified by Entry Standard | 45.08 - Lohrheidestadion, Wattenscheid, Bochum (GER) - 26 JUL 2026 |
| 19 | 2 | Italy | Mohamed Soudassi | 45.10 | 45.10 | Qualified by Entry Standard | 45.10 - Stadio M.S. Cozzoli, Molfetta (ITA) - 11 JUL 2026 |
| reserve | 4 | Great Britain & N.I. | Sam Lunt | 45.16 | 45.16 | Qualified by Entry Standard | 45.16 - Boudewijnstadion, Bruxelles (BEL) - 23 MAY 2026 |
| 20 | 1 | Switzerland | Haydn Brotschi | 45.20 | 45.20 | Qualified by Entry Standard | 45.20 - Weaver Stadium, Princeton, NJ (USA) - 17 MAY 2026 |
| 21 | 1 | Romania | Mihai Sorin Dringo | 44.74 | 45.57 | Qualified by Entry Standard | 45.21 - National Stadium, Tokyo (JPN) - 14 SEP 2025 |
| 22 | 3 | Italy | Lorenzo Benati | 45.21 | 45.21 | Qualified by Entry Standard | 45.21 - Stadio Luigi Ridolfi, Firenze (ITA) - 26 JUL 2026 |
| 23 | 2 | Switzerland | Lionel Spitz | 45.01 | 45.34 | Qualified by Entry Standard | 45.24 - Kleine Allmend, Frauenfeld (SUI) - 24 AUG 2025 |
| reserve | 5 | Great Britain & N.I. | Brodie Young | 45.24 | 45.24 | Qualified by Entry Standard | 45.24 - John McDonnell Field, Fayetteville, AR (USA) - 08 MAY 2026 |
| 24 | 2 | Hungary | Patrik Simon Enyingi | 44.84 | 45.27 | Qualified by Entry Standard | 45.25 - National Stadium, Tokyo (JPN) - 14 SEP 2025 |
| reserve | 4 | Italy | Luca Sito | 44.75 | 45.39 | Qualified by World Rankings | 15th - 1210 points |
| 25 | 1 | Portugal | Omar Elkhatib | 45.42 | 45.45 | Qualified by World Rankings | 18th - 1199 points |
| 26 | 1 | Turkey | Kubilay Ençü | 45.27 | 45.27 | Qualified by World Rankings | 22nd - 1182 points |
| 27 | 1 | Ukraine | Oleksandr Pohorilko | 44.81 | 45.76 | Qualified by World Rankings | 24th - 1179 points |
| 28 | 2 | Portugal | João Coelho | 44.79 | 45.64 | Qualified by World Rankings | 31st - 1171 points |
| 29 | 3 | Portugal | Ericsson Tavares | 45.63 | 45.63 | Qualified by World Rankings | 37th - 1167 points |
| 30 | 1 | Denmark | Gustav Lundholm Nielsen | 45.41 | 45.57 | Qualified by World Rankings | 42nd - 1165 points |
| 31 | 1 | Ireland | Jack Raftery | 44.98 | 45.72 | Qualified by World Rankings | 45th - 1161 points |
| 32 | 3 | Switzerland | Ricky Petrucciani | 45.02 | 45.65 | Qualified by World Rankings | 47th - 1157 points |
| 33 | 1 | Norway | Håvard Bentdal Ingvaldsen | 44.39 | 45.86 | Qualified by World Rankings | 51st - 1153 points |
| 34 | 2 | Slovenia | Lovro Mesec Košir | 45.78 | 45.78 | Qualified by World Rankings | 58th - 1148 points |
| 35 | 1 | Spain | Ángel González | 45.53 | 45.53 | Qualified by World Rankings | 60th - 1145 points |
| 36 | 1 | Albania | Franko Burraj | 45.85 | 45.85 | Qualified by World Rankings | 70th - 1133 points |
| reserve | 2 | Norway | Andreas Grimerud | 45.90 | 46.59 | Next best by World Rankings | 76th - 1127 points |
| reserve | 2 | Ireland | Andrew Egan | 45.86 | 46.16 | Next best by World Rankings | 85th - 1122 points |
| reserve | 4 | Portugal | André Franco | 46.67 | 46.67 | Next best by World Rankings | 156th - 1079 points |

| Bye to semi-finals | Reserve activated | Withdrawal / reserve unused |

== Schedule ==
| Date | Time | Round |
|---|---|---|
| 10 August 2026 | 11:55 | Round 1 |
| 11 August 2026 | 21:00 | Semi-finals |
| 12 August 2026 | 20:50 | Final |

All times are local times (UTC+1)

== Results ==
=== Round 1 ===
Round 1 was held on 10 August 2026, at 11:15 in the morning. 12 best performers (q) advanced to the semi-finals.

==== Heat 1 ====
| Place | Lane | Athlete | Nation | Time | Notes |
|---|---|---|---|---|---|
| 1 | 5 | Patrik Simon Enyingi | Hungary | 44.87 | q, SB |
| 2 | 7 | Omar Elkhatib | Portugal | 45.49 | q |
| 3 | 9 | Maksymilian Szwed | Poland | 45.53 | q |
| 4 | 8 | Thorben Finke | Germany | 45.79 | q |
| 5 | 2 | Mihai Dringo | Romania | 46.03 | q |
| 6 | 3 | Ricky Petrucciani | Switzerland | 46.14 | |
| 7 | 4 | Håvard Bentdal Ingvaldsen | Norway | 46.16 | |
| 8 | 6 | Oleksandr Pohorilko | Ukraine | 46.55 | |

==== Heat 2 ====
| Place | Lane | Athlete | Nation | Time | Notes |
|---|---|---|---|---|---|
| 1 | 9 | Yann Spillman | France | 45.54 | q |
| 2 | 3 | Jack Raftery | Ireland | 45.81 | q |
| 3 | 6 | João Coelho | Portugal | 46.06 | |
| 4 | 4 | Dylan Borlée | Belgium | 46.17 | |
| 5 | 7 | Lorenzo Benati | Italy | 46.23 | |
| 6 | 5 | Ángel González | Spain | 46.53 | |
| 7 | 8 | Haydn Brotschi | Switzerland | 46.89 | |

==== Heat 3 ====
| Place | Lane | Athlete | Nation | Time | Notes |
|---|---|---|---|---|---|
| 1 | 4 | Jonathan Sacoor | Belgium | 45.60 | q |
| 2 | 2 | Lionel Spitz | Switzerland | 45.70 | q |
| 3 | 7 | Eugene Omalla | Netherlands | 45.74 | q |
| 4 | 8 | Gustav Lundholm Nielsen | Denmark | 45.83 | q |
| 5 | 6 | Ericsson Tavares | Portugal | 45.92 | q |
| 6 | 5 | Kubilay Ençü | Turkey | 46.13 | |
| 7 | 9 | Lovro Mesec Košir | Slovenia | 46.66 | |
| 8 | 3 | Franko Burraj | Albania | 46.96 | |

=== Semi-finals ===
The semi-finals were held on 11 August 2026, at 21:00 in the evening. The twelve qualifiers from round 1 are joined by the twelve seeded athletes. First 2 in each heat (Q) and the next 2 fastest (q) advanced to the final.

==== Heat 1 ====
| Place | Lane | Athlete | Nation | Time | Notes |
|---|---|---|---|---|---|
| 1 | 6 | Jonas Phijffers | Netherlands | 44.63 | Q, PB |
| 2 | 7 | Matthew Hudson-Smith | Great Britain & N.I. | 44.78 | Q |
| 3 | 8 | Daniel Segers | Belgium | 45.03 | q |
| 4 | 9 | Maksymilian Szwed | Poland | 45.10 | q |
| 5 | 3 | Omar Elkhatib | Portugal | 45.22 | PB |
| 6 | 5 | Yann Spillmann | France | 45.56 | |
| 7 | 4 | Thorben Finke | Germany | 45.66 | |
| 8 | 2 | Rok Ferlan | Slovenia | 46.09 | |

==== Heat 2 ====
| Place | Lane | Athlete | Nation | Time | Notes |
|---|---|---|---|---|---|
| 1 | 7 | Jean Paul Bredau | Germany | 44.86 | Q |
| 2 | 8 | Patrik Simon Enyingi | Hungary | 45.02 | Q |
| 3 | 9 | Edoardo Scotti | Italy | 45.32 | |
| 4 | 4 | Lionel Spitz | Switzerland | 45.34 | =SB |
| 5 | 5 | Ben Jefferies | Great Britain & N.I. | 45.38 | |
| 6 | 6 | Samuel Vessat | France | 45.40 | |
| 7 | 3 | Jack Raftery | Ireland | 45.81 | |
| 8 | 2 | Mihai Sorin Dringo | Romania | 46.91 | |

==== Heat 3 ====
| Place | Lane | Athlete | Nation | Time | Notes |
|---|---|---|---|---|---|
| 1 | 8 | Muhammad Abdallah Kounta | France | 44.38 | Q, PB |
| 2 | 6 | Attila Molnár | Hungary | 44.60 | Q |
| 3 | 5 | George John Franks | Greece | 45.15 | |
| 4 | 7 | Charlie Dobson | Great Britain & N.I. | 45.18 | |
| 5 | 9 | Eugene Omalla | Netherlands | 45.19 | |
| 6 | 3 | Ericsson Tavares | Portugal | 45.63 | =PB |
| 7 | 2 | Gustav Lundholm Nielsen | Denmark | 45.65 | |
| 8 | 4 | Jonathan Sacoor | Belgium | 46.14 | |

=== Final ===
The final was held on 12 August 2026, at 20:50 in the evening.

| Place | Lane | Athlete | Nation | Time | Notes |
|---|---|---|---|---|---|
| 1st place, gold medalist(s) | 9 | Matthew Hudson-Smith | Great Britain & N.I. | 44.17 | |
| 2nd place, silver medalist(s) | 8 | Muhammad Abdallah Kounta | France | 44.40 | |
| 3rd place, bronze medalist(s) | 5 | Jonas Phijffers | Netherlands | 44.41 | NR |
| 4 | 7 | Attila Molnár | Hungary | 44.55 | |
| 5 | 6 | Jean Paul Bredau | Germany | 44.93 | |
| 6 | 3 | Maksymilian Szwed | Poland | 45.06 | |
| 7 | 4 | Patrik Simon Enyingi | Hungary | 45.36 | |
| 8 | 2 | Daniel Segers | Belgium | 45.48 | |
