= 2023 European Athletics U23 Championships – Men's 4 × 400 metres relay =

Men's 4 × 400 metres relay at the 2023 European Athletics U23 Championships
- Venue: Leppävaara Stadium
- Location: Espoo, Finland
- Dates: 15 July
- Competitors: 67 from 14 nations
- Winning time: 3:02.49

Medalists
gold medal	Luca Sito; Riccardo Meli; Francesco Domenico Rossi; Lorenzo Benati; Andrea Panassidi; Matteo Raimondi	Italy
silver medal	Ilyas Çanakçi; Kubilay Ençü; Berke Akçam; İsmail Nezir; Yağız Canlı; Oğuzhan Kaya	Turkey
bronze medal	Ethan Brown; Brodie Young; Samuel Reardon; Edward Faulds; Isaac Cory; Emmanuel Agyare	Great Britain

The men's 4 × 400 metres relay event at the 2023 European Athletics U23 Championships was held in Espoo, Finland, at Leppävaara Stadium on 15 and 16 July.

== Records ==
Prior to the competition, the records were as follows:

European U23 record	Russia (RUS)	3:02.13	Debrecen, Hungary	15 July 2007
Championship U23 record	Russia (RUS)	3:02.13	Debrecen, Hungary	15 July 2007

== Results ==
=== Heats ===
First 3 in each heat (Q) and the next 2 fastest (q) advance to the Final.

==== Heat 1 ====
Place	Nation	Athletes	Time	Notes
1	Switzerland	Jérémy Valnet, Nick Stalder, Vincent Gendre, Lionel Spitz	3:06.08	Q, NU23R
2	Great Britain	Ethan Brown, Isaac Cory, Emmanuel Agyare, Brodie Young	3:06.21	Q, SB
3	Germany	Tyrel Prenz, Vincente Graiani, Rocco Martin, Lukas Krappe	3:06.24	Q, SB
4	Turkey	Yağız Canlı, Kubilay Ençü, Oğuzhan Kaya, İlyas Çanakçı	3:06.27	q, NU23R
5	Ireland	Andrew Egan, Callum Baird, Aaron Keane, Jack Raftery	3:06.34	q, NU23R
6	France	Alphonse Robin, Benoît Moudio Priso, Yann Spillmann, Eymeric Ahoue	3:07.81	SB
—	Netherlands	Keenan Blake, Isaya Klein Ikkink, Daan Kneppers, Jonas Phijffers	DQ	

==== Heat 2 ====
Place	Nation	Athletes	Time	Notes
1	Italy	Francesco Domenico Rossi, Andrea Panassidi, Matteo Raimondi, Riccardo Meli	3:05.99	Q, SB
2	Poland	Remigiusz Zazula, Jan Wawrzkowicz, Mikołaj Kotyra, Patryk Grzegorzewicz	3:06.72	Q, SB
3	Spain	Markel Fernández, Ángel González, Manuel Bea, Bernat Erta	3:07.48	Q, SB
4	Belgium	Daniel Segers, Mathys Latinne, Mattis Tanghe, Adrien Devriendt	3:08.35	SB
5	Sweden	Alexander Nyström, Emil Johansson, Gustav Gahne, Mattias Waernulf	3:09.12	SB
6	Romania	Mihai Dringo, Cristian Voicu, Remus Andrei Niculita, Sorin Voinea	3:09.44	SB
7	Finland	Peetu Toivonen, Valtteri Keskinen, Rasmus Wright, Jaakko Linnus	3:13.20	SB

==== Rerun ====
Place	Nation	Athletes	Time	Notes
1	Netherlands	Keenan Blake, Isaya Klein Ikkink, Daan Kneppers, Jonas Phijffers	3:07.12	SB

=== Final ===
Place	Nation	Athletes	Time	Notes
1st place, gold medalist(s)	Italy	Luca Sito, Riccardo Meli, Francesco Domenico Rossi, Lorenzo Benati	3:02.49	NU23R
2nd place, silver medalist(s)	Turkey	İlyas Çanakçı, Kubilay Ençü, Berke Akçam, İsmail Nezir	3:03.04	SB
3rd place, bronze medalist(s)	Great Britain	Ethan Brown, Brodie Young, Samuel Reardon, Edward Faulds	3:03.12	
4	Poland	Igor Bogaczyński, Jan Wawrzkowicz, Patryk Grzegorzewicz, Daniel Sołtysiak	3:03.79	NU23R
5	Switzerland	Jérémy Valnet, Nick Stalder, Nahom Yirga, Lionel Spitz	3:05.51	NU23R
6	Spain	Ángel González, Markel Fernández, Manuel Bea, Bernat Erta	3:05.68	
7	Germany	Tyrel Prenz, Vincente Graiani, Malte Stangenberg, Lukas Krappe	3:07.50	
8	Ireland	Andrew Egan, Callum Baird, Ciaran Carthy, Aaron Keane	3:08.54	
