= 2026 European Athletics Championships – Mixed 4 × 400 metres relay =

Mixed 4 × 400 metres relay at the 2026 European Athletics Championships
- Venue: Alexander Stadium
- Location: Birmingham, United Kingdom
- Dates: 10 August 2026
- Nations: 8
- Winning time: 3:09.62 CR, EL, NR

Medalists
gold medal	Karsten Warholm; Amalie Iuel; Andreas Ofstad Kulseng; Henriette Jæger	Norway
silver medal	Ben Jefferies; Charlotte Henrich; Toby Harries; Yemi Mary John	Great Britain
bronze medal	Jonas Phijffers; Lieke Klaver; Terrence Agard; Myrte van der Schoot	Netherlands

The mixed 4 × 400 metres relay at the 2026 European Athletics Championships took place at the Alexander Stadium in Birmingham, United Kingdom, on 10 August 2026.

== Background ==
Records before the 2026 European Athletics Championships
Record	Athlete (nation)	Time	Location	Date
World record	United States (Vernon Norwood, Shamier Little, Bryce Deadmon, Kaylyn Brown)	3:07.41	Saint-Denis, France	2 August 2024
European record	Netherlands (Eugene Omalla, Lieke Klaver, Isaya Klein Ikkink, Femke Bol)	3:07.43	Saint-Denis, France	3 August 2024
Championship record	Ireland (Christopher O'Donnell, Rhasidat Adeleke, Thomas Barr, Sharlene Mawdsley)	3:09.92	Rome, Italy	7 June 2024
World leading	United States (Bryce Deadmon, Paris Peoples, Jenoah McKiver, Bailey Lear)	3:07.47	Gaborone, Botswana	3 May 2026
European leading	Great Britain (Alex Haydock-Wilson, Lina Nielsen, Jake Minshull, Yemi Mary John)	3:09.69	Gaborone, Botswana	2 May 2026

== Qualification ==
For the mixed 4 × 400 metres relay, the qualification period is from 1 January 2025 to 26 July 2026. The qualification procedure will be based on the aggregate of the two fastest times achieved by national teams in the qualification period. For being ranked, the results of relay races shall be valid only on condition that they are part of a competition staged in compliance with World Athletics Rules (and included into World Athletics Global Calendar) and that at least 2 international teams, representing at least 2 countries compete in the race. A total of 8 national teams can compete in the event. Host nation Great Britain has the right to be represented with one national team in the event. If they wish to participate and are not qualified as indicated above, the number of national teams to qualify will be reduced to 7.

Qualification standings per 31 July 2026
QP	Country	Registered athletes	Status	Accumulated times	Result 1	Result 2
1	Great Britain & N.I.	Amber Anning; Charles Dobson; Toby Harries; Charlotte Henrich; Matthew Hudson-Smith; Ben Jefferies; Yemi Mary John; Nicole Yeargin	Allocated to Host Country			
2	Poland	Natalia Bukowiecka; Kajetan Duszyński; Anna Gryc; Marcin Karolewski; Anastazja Kuś; Maksymilian Szwed; Alicja Wrona-Kutrzepa; Remigiusz Zazula	Qualified by European Ranking	6:20.06	3:09.43	3:10.63
3	Italy	Ilaria Elvira Accame; Vanni Picco Akwannor; Sara Cirillo; Riccardo Meli; Mohamed Soudassi	Qualified by European Ranking	6:20.18	3:09.66	3:10.52
4	Spain	Bernat Erta; David García; Samuel García; Blanca Hervás; Ana Prieto; Eva Santidrián; Paula Sevilla	Qualified by European Ranking	6:20.37	3:09.89	3:10.48
5	Belgium	Dylan Borlée; Ilana Hasnssens; Helena Ponette; Jonathan Sacoor	Qualified by European Ranking	6:20.98	3:10.37	3:10.61
6	Netherlands	Lieke Klaver; Jonas Phijffers tbd tbd	Qualified by European Ranking	6:21.07	3:09.96	3:11.11
7	France	Isabelle Black; Amandine Brossier; Benedetta Kouakou; Muhammad Abdallah Kounta; Louise Maraval; Benoît Moudio Priso; Yann Spillmann; Samuel Vessat	Qualified by European Ranking	6:22.78	3:11.07	3:11.71
8	Norway	Josefine Tomine Eriksen Aks; Andreas Grimerud; Håvard Bentdal Ingvaldsen; Amalie Iuel; Henriette Jæger; Andreas Ofstad Kulseng; Karsten Warholm	Qualified by European Ranking	6:23.83	3:10.19	3:13.64

== Schedule ==
Date	Time	Round
10 August 2026	21:40	Final

All times are local times (UTC+1)

== Results ==
=== Final ===
Rank	Lane	Nation	Athletes	Time	Note
1st place, gold medalist(s)	6	Norway	Karsten Warholm, Amalie Iuel, Andreas Ofstad Kulseng, Henriette Jæger	3:09.62	CR, EL, NR
2nd place, silver medalist(s)	5	Great Britain & N.I.	Ben Jefferies, Charlotte Henrich, Toby Harries, Yemi Mary John	3:10.47	
3rd place, bronze medalist(s)	3	Netherlands	Jonas Phijffers, Lieke Klaver, Terrence Agard, Myrte van der Schoot	3:10.77	SB
4	2	Poland	Maksymilian Szwed, Alicja Wrona-Kutrzepa, Remigiusz Zazula, Natalia Bukowiecka	3:12.07	SB
5	7	Spain	David García, Paula Sevilla, Asabu Pinés, Blanca Hervás	3:12.29	
6	8	Italy	Mohamed Soudassi, Anna Polinari, Luca Sito, Alice Mangione	3:13.12	
7	4	France	Samuel Vessat, Benedetta Kouakou, Benoît Moudio Priso, Isabelle Black	3:15.85	
8	9	Belgium	Robin Vanderbemden, Ilana Hanssens, Florent Mabille, Kylie Lambert	3:17.92	
