= 2023 European Athletics U23 Championships – Men's 400 metres =

Men's 400 metres at the 2023 European Athletics U23 Championships
- Venue: Leppävaara Stadium
- Location: Espoo, Finland
- Dates: 13 July (heats & semi-final); 14 July (final)
- Competitors: 30 from 19 nations
- Winning time: 45.13

Medalists
gold medal	Håvard Bentdal Ingvaldsen	Norway
silver medal	Lionel Spitz	Switzerland
bronze medal	Attila Molnár	Hungary

The Men's 400 metres event at the 2023 European Athletics U23 Championships was held in Espoo, Finland, at Leppävaara Stadium on 13 and 14 July.

== Records ==
Prior to the competition, the records were as follows:

European U23 record	Thomas Schönlebe (GDR)	44.33	Rome, Italy	3 September 1987
Championship U23 record	Ricky Petrucciani (SUI)	45.02	Tallinn, Estonia	10 July 2021

== Results ==
=== Heats ===
First 3 in each heat (Q) and the next 4 fastest (q) will qualify for the semi-finals.

==== Heat 1 ====
Place	Athlete	Nation	Time	Notes
1	Lorenzo Benati	Italy	45.96	Q
2	Jack Raftery	Ireland	46.20	Q, SB
3	Andreas Grimerud	Norway	46.39	Q
4	Tomas Keršulis	Lithuania	46.47	q
5	Bernat Erta	Spain	46.63	q
6	Isaya Klein Ikkink	Netherlands	47.42	
7	Kubilay Ençü	Turkey	47.44	
8	Probo Benvenuti	San Marino	49.05	PB

==== Heat 2 ====
Place	Athlete	Nation	Time	Notes
1	Håvard Bentdal Ingvaldsen	Norway	46.12	Q
2	Luca Sito	Italy	46.61	Q
3	Ludovic Oucéni	France	46.70	Q
4	Brodie Young	Great Britain	46.99	
5	Emil Johansson	Sweden	47.18	
6	İlyas Çanakçı	Turkey	47.32	
7	Manuel Bea	Spain	47.57	

==== Heat 3 ====
Place	Athlete	Nation	Time	Notes
1	Attila Molnár	Hungary	45.86	Q
2	Omar Elkhatib	Portugal	46.22	Q
3	Mihai Dringo	Romania	46.40	Q
4	Markel Fernández	Spain	46.67	q
5	Daniel Sołtysiak	Poland	46.99	
6	Mykyta Barabanov	Ukraine	47.15	
7	Artūrs Pastors	Latvia	47.60	
8	Ivan Galuşco	Moldova	48.01	

==== Heat 4 ====
Place	Athlete	Nation	Time	Notes
1	Lionel Spitz	Switzerland	46.29	Q
2	Riccardo Meli	Italy	46.54	Q
3	Ernő Steigerwald	Hungary	46.78	Q
4	Jonas Phijffers	Netherlands	46.90	q
5	Callum Baird	Ireland	47.26	
6	Sorin Voinea	Romania	47.49	
7	Oğuzhan Kaya	Turkey	47.76	

=== Semi-final ===
First 3 in each heat (Q) and the next 2 fastest (q) will qualify for the semi-finals.

==== Heat 1 ====
Place	Athlete	Nation	Time	Notes
1	Attila Molnár	Hungary	45.35	Q
2	Lionel Spitz	Switzerland	45.50	Q, SB
3	Jack Raftery	Ireland	45.89	Q, PB
4	Tomas Keršulis	Lithuania	46.30	q
5	Luca Sito	Italy	46.34	
6	Andreas Grimerud	Norway	46.88	
7	Markel Fernández	Spain	46.92	
—	Ludovic Oucéni	France	DNF	

==== Heat 2 ====
Place	Athlete	Nation	Time	Notes
1	Håvard Bentdal Ingvaldsen	Norway	45.35	Q
2	Mihai Dringo	Romania	45.84	Q
3	Lorenzo Benati	Italy	45.94	Q
4	Omar Elkhatib	Portugal	45.99	q, PB
5	Jonas Phijffers	Netherlands	46.60	
6	Riccardo Meli	Italy	46.68	
7	Ernő Steigerwald	Hungary	46.92	
8	Bernat Erta	Spain	47.10	

=== Final ===
Place	Lane	Athlete	Nation	Time	Notes
1st place, gold medalist(s)	5	Håvard Bentdal Ingvaldsen	Norway	45.13	
2nd place, silver medalist(s)	4	Lionel Spitz	Switzerland	45.27	PB
3rd place, bronze medalist(s)	7	Attila Molnár	Hungary	45.36	
4	6	Mihai Dringo	Romania	45.56	PB
5	3	Lorenzo Benati	Italy	45.70	
6	2	Omar Elkhatib	Portugal	45.73	NU23R
7	8	Jack Raftery	Ireland	46.00	
8	1	Tomas Keršulis	Lithuania	46.89	
