= Italy at the 2024 European Athletics Championships =

Italy team at athletics event

- Flag of Italy
- WA code: ITA

in Rome, Italy 7 June 2024 – 12 June 2022
- Competitors: 113
- Medals Ranked 1st: Gold 11 Silver 9 Bronze 4 Total 24

European Athletics Championships appearances (overview)
- 1934; 1938; 1946; 1950; 1954; 1958; 1962; 1966; 1969; 1971; 1974; 1978; 1982; 1986; 1990; 1994; 1998; 2002; 2006; 2010; 2012; 2014; 2016; 2018; 2022; 2024

Italy competed at the 2024 European Athletics Championships in Rome, Italy between 7 and 12 June 2024.

== Medals ==
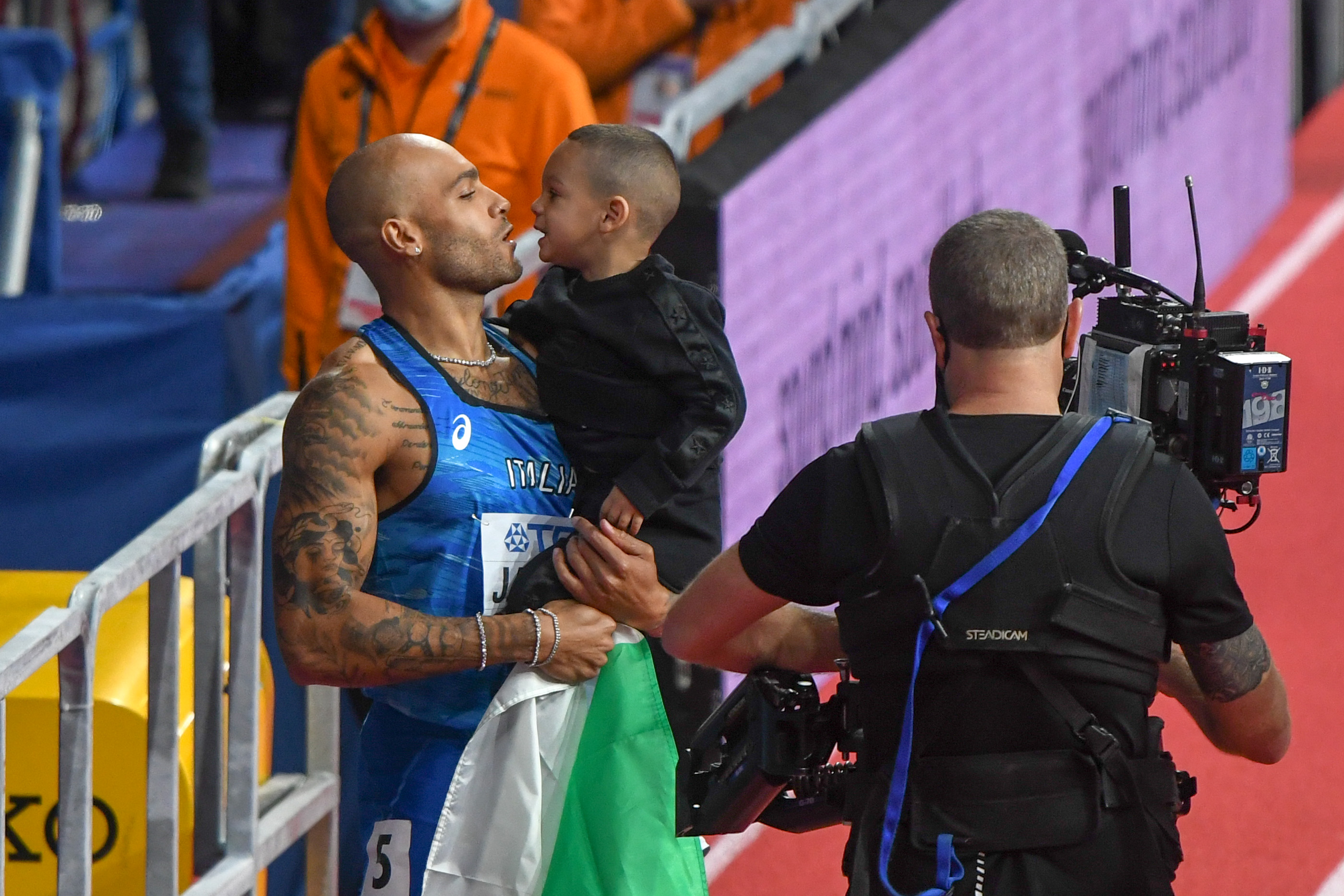
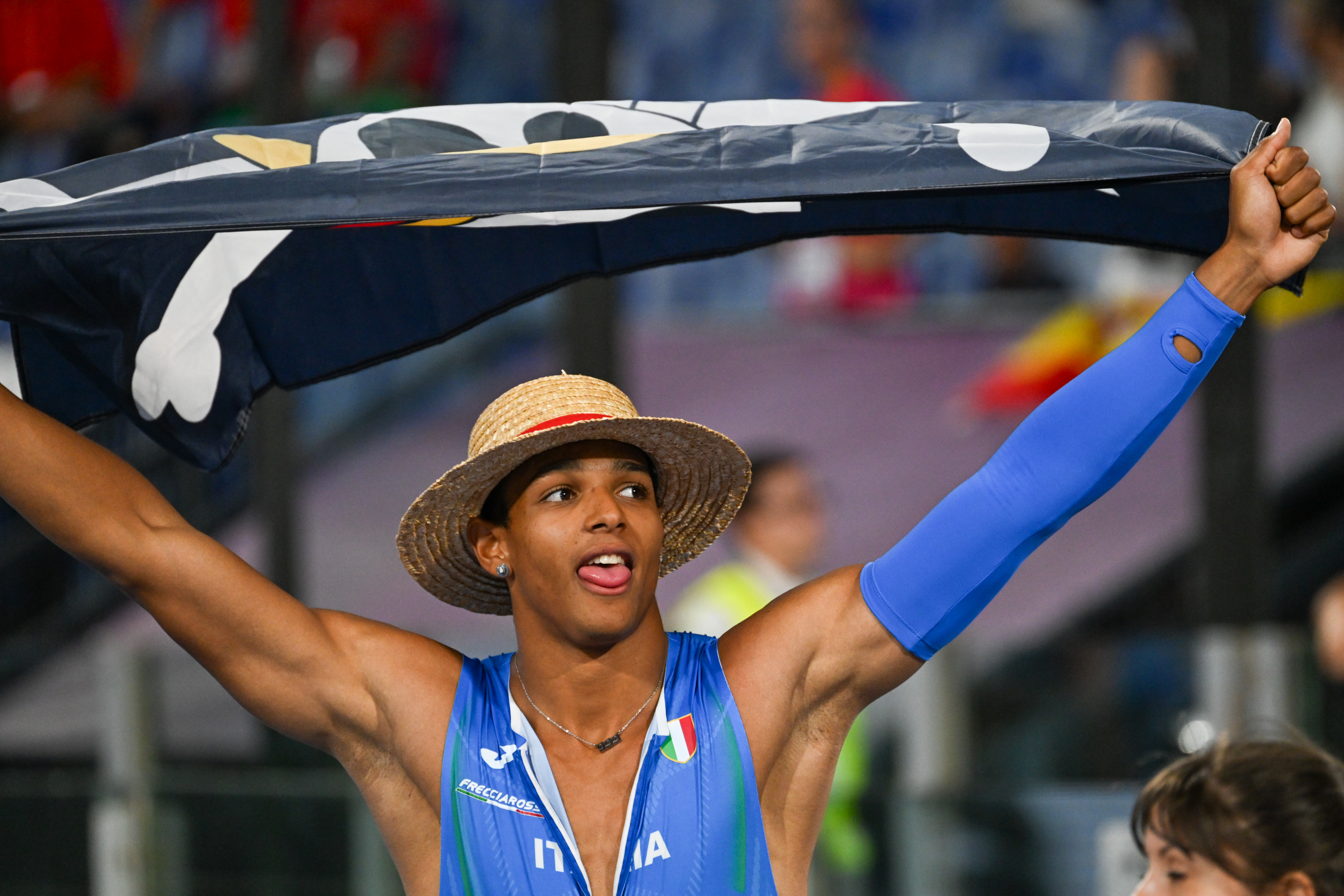
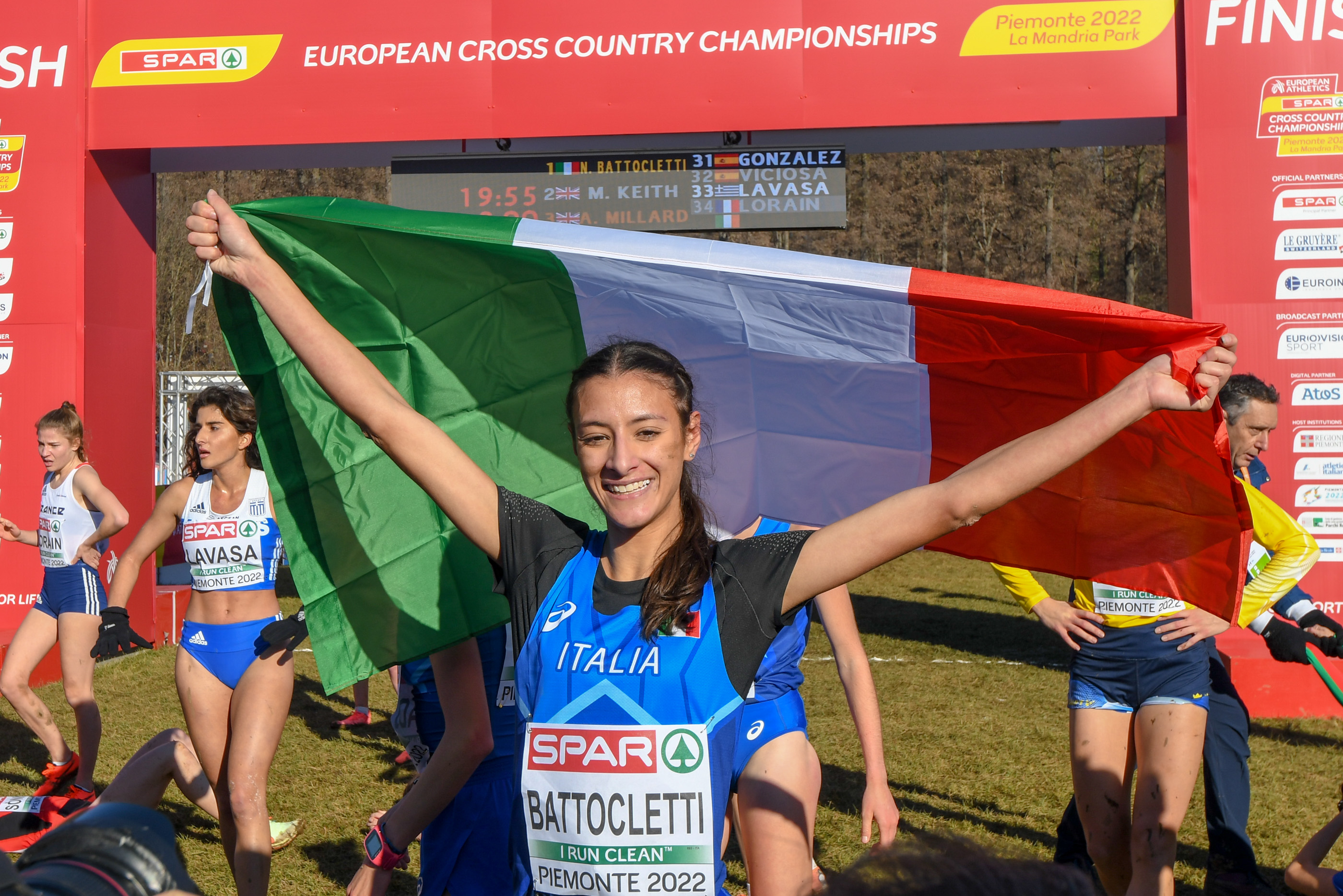
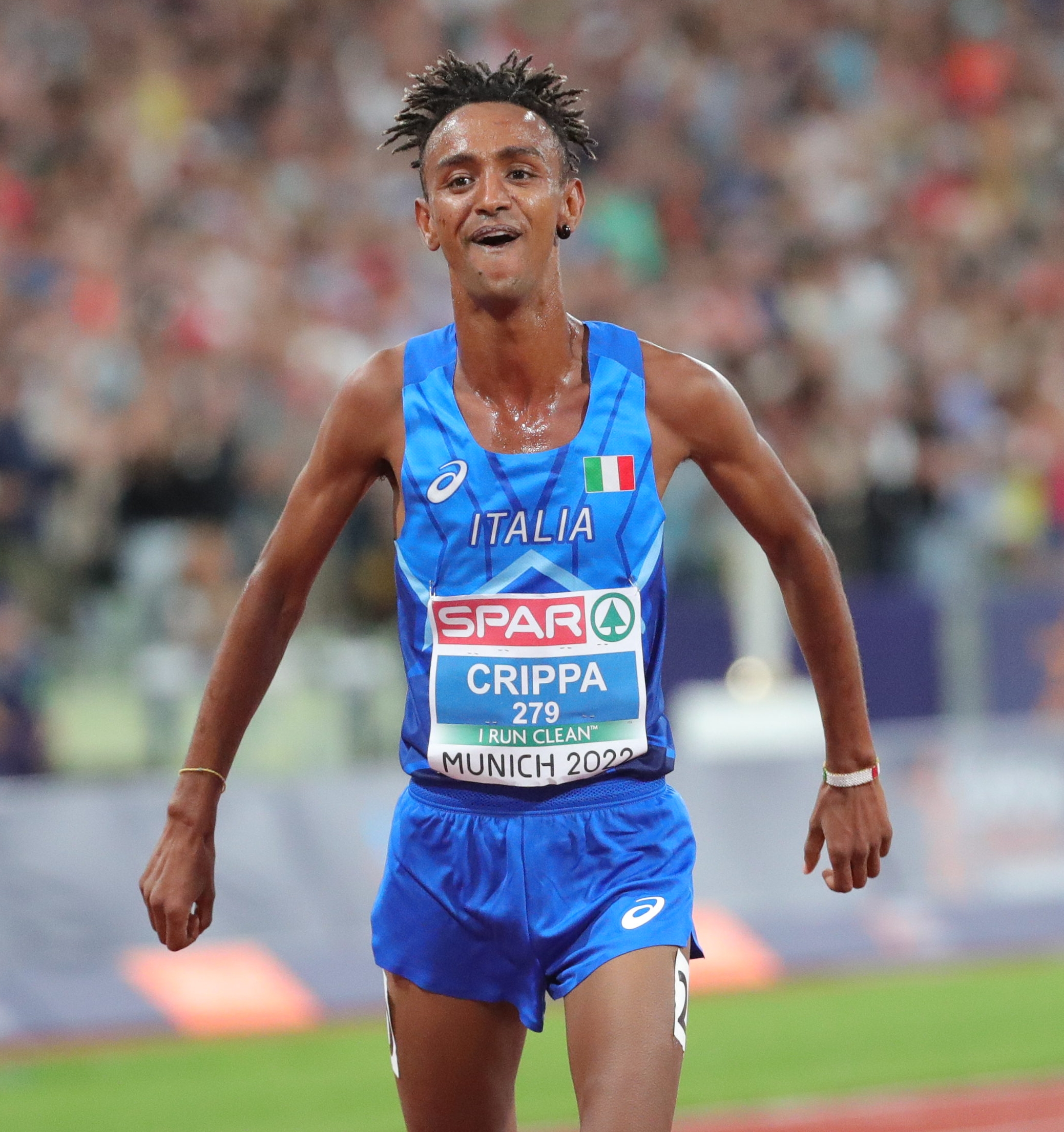
Jacobs, Simonelli, Battocletti and Crippa, all won golds for Italy team.

Medal	Athlete	Event	Date
1st place, gold medalist(s)	Antonella Palmisano	Women's 20 km walk	7 June
1st place, gold medalist(s)	Nadia Battocletti	Women's 5000 metres	7 June
1st place, gold medalist(s)	Lorenzo Simonelli	Men's 110 m hurdles	8 June
1st place, gold medalist(s)	Leonardo Fabbri	Men's shot put	8 June
1st place, gold medalist(s)	Marcell Jacobs	Men's 100 m	8 June
1st place, gold medalist(s)	Yemaneberhan Crippa	Men's half marathon	9 June
1st place, gold medalist(s)	Yemaneberhan Crippa; Pietro Riva; Pasquale Selvarolo; Eyob Faniel; Yohanes Chiappinelli; Daniele Meucci	Men's half marathon team	9 June
1st place, gold medalist(s)	Sara Fantini	Women's hammer throw	10 June
1st place, gold medalist(s)	Nadia Battocletti	Women's 10,000 metres	11 June
1st place, gold medalist(s)	Gianmarco Tamberi	Men's high jump	11 June
1st place, gold medalist(s)	Matteo Melluzzo; Marcell Jacobs; Lorenzo Patta; Filippo Tortu; Roberto Rigali (Note: Ran in the heats); Lorenzo Simonelli	Men's 4×100 m relay	12 June
2nd place, silver medalist(s)	Valentina Trapletti	Women's 20 km walk	7 June
2nd place, silver medalist(s)	Luca Sito; Anna Polinari; Edoardo Scotti; Alice Mangione	Mixed 4×400 m relay	7 June
2nd place, silver medalist(s)	Mattia Furlani	Men's long jump	8 June
2nd place, silver medalist(s)	Chituru Ali	Men's 100 m	8 June
2nd place, silver medalist(s)	Pietro Riva	Men's half marathon	9 June
2nd place, silver medalist(s)	Filippo Tortu	Men's 200 m	10 June
2nd place, silver medalist(s)	Alessandro Sibilio	Men's 400 m hurdles	11 June
2nd place, silver medalist(s)	Luca Sito; Vladimir Aceti; Riccardo Meli; Edoardo Scotti; Brayan Lopez	Men's 4×400 m relay	12 June
2nd place, silver medalist(s)	Larissa Iapichino	Women's long jump	12 June
3rd place, bronze medalist(s)	Francesco Fortunato	Men's 20 km walk	8 June
3rd place, bronze medalist(s)	Catalin Tecuceanu	Men's 800 m	9 June
3rd place, bronze medalist(s)	Zaynab Dosso	Women's 100 m	9 June
3rd place, bronze medalist(s)	Pietro Arese	Men's 1500 m	12 June

== Results ==
Italy entered the following athletes (In the relays events, some of the registered athletes are marked but there is still no official announcement of the athletes who will compete).

Key

- Q = Qualified for the next round
- q = Qualified for the next round as a fastest loser or, in field events, by position without achieving the qualifying target
- NR = National record
- PB = Personal best
- SB = Season best
- N/A = Round not applicable for the event

=== Men ===
Track and road events

Athlete	Event	Heat		Semifinal		Final	
Athlete	Event	Result	Rank	Result	Rank	Result	Rank
Chituru Ali	100 metres	Bye		10.11	2 q	10.05 PB	2nd place, silver medalist(s)
Marcell Jacobs	100 metres	Bye		10.05	1 q	10.02 SB	1st place, gold medalist(s)
Matteo Melluzzo	100 metres	10.21	2 q	DNF		Did not advance	
Roberto Rigali	100 metres	10.34	10 q	10.36	17	Did not advance	
Eseosa Desalu	200 metres	Bye		20.39 SB	5 q	20.59	6
Diego Aldo Pettorossi	200 metres	20.56 SB	4 q	20.88	18	Did not advance	
Filippo Tortu	200 metres	Bye		20.14 SB	1 q	20.41	2nd place, silver medalist(s)
Luca Sito	400 metres	45.12	1 q	44.75 EU23L	2 q	45.04	5
Riccardo Meli	400 metres	46.17 SB	16	Did not advance			
Edoardo Scotti	400 metres	45.59	6 q	45.92	19	Did not advance	
Simone Barontini	800 metres	1.46.30	2 Q	1.47.10	6	Did not advance	
Francesco Pernici	800 metres	1.45.87	2 Q	DQ		Did not advance	
Catalin Tecuceanu	800 metres	1.44.93	3 Q	1.46.30	1 Q	1.45.40	3rd place, bronze medalist(s)
Pietro Arese	1500 metres	3.44.09	2 Q	—		3.33.34	3rd place, bronze medalist(s)
Ossama Meslek	1500 metres	3.38.41	4 Q	—		3.36.35	14
Federico Riva	1500 metres	3.37.75	2 Q	—		3.37.37	15
Yemaneberhan Crippa	10,000 metres	—				DNS	
Francesco Guerra	10,000 metres	—				28.31.15	19
Ahmed Ouhda	10,000 metres	—				28.33.50	20
Pietro Riva	10,000 metres	—				DNS	
Luca Ursano	10,000 metres	—				28.47.63	30
'Yemaneberhan Crippa	Half marathon	—				1:01.03 CR	1st place, gold medalist(s)
Pietro Riva	Half marathon	—				1:01.04 SB	2nd place, silver medalist(s)
Eyob Faniel	Half marathon	—				1:01.29 SB	8
Daniele Meucci	Half marathon	—				1:03.45 SB	27
Pasquale Servarolo	Half marathon	—				1:01.27 SB	6
Yohannes Chiappinelli	Half marathon	—				1:01.42 SB	10
Yemaneberhan Crippa; Pietro Riva; Eyob Faniel; Daniele Meucci; Pasquale Servarolo; Yohannes Chiappinelli	Half marathon team	—				3:03:34	1st place, gold medalist(s)
Hassane Fofana	110 metres hurdles	13.70 SB	7 q	13.70	15	Did not advance	
Nicolò Giacalone	110 metres hurdles	13.86	15	Did not advance			
Lorenzo Simonelli	110 metres hurdles	Bye		13.20 EL	1 Q	13.05 EL	1st place, gold medalist(s)
Giacomo Bertoncelli	400 metres hurdles	49.41	3 Q	49.83	7	Did not advance	
Mario Lambrughi	400 metres hurdles	49.74 SB	1 Q	50.03	6	Did not advance	
Alessandro Sibilio	400 metres hurdles	Bye		48.07	1 Q	47.50 NR	2nd place, silver medalist(s)
Yassin Bouih	3000 metres steeplechase	8.34.06	4 Q	—		8.27.29	14
Ala Zoghlami	3000 metres steeplechase	8.31.88	12	—		Did not advance	
Osama Zoghlami	3000 metres steeplechase	8.34.31	7 Q	—		8.21.09	8
Gianluca Picchiottino	20 kilometres walk	—				DNF	
Francesco Fortunato	20 kilometres walk	—				1:19.54 SB	3rd place, bronze medalist(s)
Riccardo Orsini	20 kilometres walk	—				1:21.08	6
Marcell Jacobs; Matteo Melluzzo; Roberto Rigali; Filippo Tortu; Lorenzo Patta	4 × 100 metres relay	38.40 EL	2 Q	—		37.82	1st place, gold medalist(s)
Edoardo Scotti; Luca Sito; Vladimir Aceti; Riccardo Meli; Brayan Lopez	4 × 400 metres relay	3:02.01	2 Q	—		3:00.81 SB	2nd place, silver medalist(s)

Field events

Athlete	Event	Qualification		Final	
Athlete	Event	Distance	Position	Distance	Position
Marco Fassinotti	high jump	2.17	20	Did not advance	
Manuel Lando	high jump	2.21	1 q	2.22	6
Stefano Sottile	high jump	2.21	1 q	2.22	6
Gianmarco Tamberi	high jump	2.21	1 q	2.37 CR	1st place, gold medalist(s)
Simone Bertelli	Pole vault	5.25	21	Did not advance	
Claudio M. Stecchi	Pole vault	5.25 SB	26	Did not advance	
Mattia Furlani	Long jump	8.17	3 Q	8.38 WU20R	2nd place, silver medalist(s)
Kareem Hatem Mersal	Long jump	7.55	27	Did not advance	
Filippo Randazzo	Long jump	7.94	13	Did not advance	
Tobia Bocchi	Triple jump	16.43 SB	14 qR	16.18	11
Andrea Dallavalle	Triple jump	16.59 SB	11 q	16.90 SB	8
Emmanuel Ihemeje	Triple jump	16.98	3 Q	16.92	7
Lorenzo Del Gatto	Shot put	18.83	24 q	Did not advance	
Leonardo Fabbri	Shot put	21.10	1 Q	22.45 CR	1st place, gold medalist(s)
Zane Weir	Shot put	19.71	12 q	19.70	11
Alessio Mannucci	Discus throw	61.73	13	Did not advance	

Combined events – Decathlon

Athlete	Event	100 m	LJ	SP	HJ	400 m	110H	DT	PV	JT	1500 m	Final	Rank
Dario Dester	Result	10.76 =PB	7.32 SB	12.43	2.02 SB	48.43 SB	14.28 SB	41.00 SB	4.90	63.66 PB	4:23.36 PB	8235 NR	6
Dario Dester	Points	915	891	633	822	888	939	685	880	793	789	8235 NR	6
Lorenzo Naidon	Result	11.05 SB	7.18	11.94	1.99	50.70 SB	14.54 SB	37.54	4.90	50.17 SB	4:46.48 SB	7519 SB	20
Lorenzo Naidon	Points	850	857	603	794	783	906	615	880	591	640	7519 SB	20

=== Women ===
Track and road events

Athlete	Event	Heat		Semifinal		Final	
Athlete	Event	Result	Rank	Result	Rank	Result	Rank
Anna Bongiorni	100 metres	11.35 SB	11 q	11.32 SB	18	Did not advance	
Zaynab Dosso	100 metres	Bye		11.01 NR	3 Q	11.03	3rd place, bronze medalist(s)
Dalia Kaddari	200 metres	Bye		22.98 SB	11	Did not advance	
Irene Siragusa	200 metres	23.12	6 q	23.17	15	Did not advance	
Alice Mangione	400 metres	51.71 SB	3 q	51.34 PB	9	Did not advance	
Anna Polinari	400 metres	52.06	7 q	52.53	18	Did not advance	
Giancarla D. Trevisan	400 metres	52.22 SB	11 q	52.59	21	Did not advance	
Elena Bellò	800 metres	2:02.75	22	Did not advance			
Eloisa Coiro	800 metres	2:02.86	23	Did not advance			
Ludovica Cavalli	1500 metres	4:06.76	2 Q	—		4:35.60	13
Sintayehu Vissa	1500 metres	4:11.22	10	—		Did not advance	
Marta Zenoni	1500 metres	DQ		—		Did not advance	
Nadia Battocletti	5000 metres	—				14:35.29 CR	1st place, gold medalist(s)
Federica Del Buono	5000 metres	—				15:00.05 PB	7
Micol Majori	5000 metres	—				15:20.89 PB	15
Nadia Battocletti	10,000 metres	—				30:51.32 NR	1st place, gold medalist(s)
Federica Del Buono	10,000 metres	—				31:25.41 PB	4
Anna Arnaudo	10,000 metres	—				DNF	
Valentina Gemetto	10,000 metres	—				33:23.43	21
Elisa Palmero	10,000 metres	—				31:38.45 PB	6
Elisa Palmero	Half marathon	—				1:11:22 PB	15
Sara Nestola	Half marathon	—				1:12:27	35
Federica Sugamiele	Half marathon	—				1:15:34 SB	54
Sofiia Yaremchuk	Half marathon	—				1:11:32	19
Elisa Palmero; Sara Nestola; Federic Sugamiele; Sofiia Yaremchuk	Half Marathon Cup	—				3:35:21	5
Veronica Besana	100 metres hurdles	13.05	6 q	13.02	17	Did not advance	
Giada Carmassi	100 metres hurdles	13.13	9 q	13.00	15	Did not advance	
Elena Carraro	100 metres hurdles	13.23	12 q	13.06 SB	19	Did not advance	
Ayomide Folorunso	400 metres hurdles	Bye		54.52 SB	4 q	55.20	5
Alice Muraro	400 metres hurdles	Bye		54.73 PB	9	Did not advance	
Linda Olivieri	400 metres hurdles	55.95	9 q	54.99 PB	13	Did not advance	
Eleonora Curtabbi	3000 metres steeplechase	10:05.30	16	—		Did not advance	
Eleonora Anna Giorgi	20 kilometres walk	—				1:33:29	15
Antonella Palmisano	20 kilometres walk	—				1:28:08	1st place, gold medalist(s)
Valentina Trapletti	20 kilometres walk	—				1:28:37 PB	2nd place, silver medalist(s)
Irene Siragusa; Dalia Kaddari; Anna Bongiorni; Arianna de Masi	4 × 100 metres relay	43.27	9	—		Did not advance	
Ilaria Elvira Accame; Giancarla Trevisan; Anna Polinari; Alice Mangione; Rebecca Borga (heats)	4 × 400 metres relay	3:25.28 SB	5 q	—		3:23.40 NR	4

Field events

Athlete	Event	Qualification		Final	
Athlete	Event	Distance	Position	Distance	Position
Elena Vallortigara	High jump	1.85	15	Did not advance	
Aurora Vicini	High jump	1.81	25	Did not advance	
Roberta Bruni	Pole vault	4.50	6 q	4.58	7
Sonia Malavisi	Pole vault	4.40	13	Did not advance	
Elisa Molinarolo	Pole vault	4.50	1 q	4.58	6
Larissa Iapichino	Long jump	6.71	7 Q	6.94 EU23L	2nd place, silver medalist(s)
Dariya Derkach	Triple jump	14.10 SB	5 Q	14.03	8
Emily Conte	Discus throw	NM		Did not advance	
Daisy Osakue	Discus throw	60.10	13	Did not advance	
Stefania Strumillo	Discus throw	57.04	17	Did not advance	
Federica Botter	Javelin throw	52.99	22	Did not advance	
Sara Fantini	Hammer throw	72.28	2 Q	74.18 SB	1st place, gold medalist(s)
Rachele Mori	Hammer throw	68.52 SB	13	Did not advance	

Combined events – Heptathlon

Athlete	Event	100H	HJ	SP	200 m	LJ	JT	800 m	Final	Rank
Sveva Gerevini	Result	13.35 PB	1.80 PB	12.37	23.81 PB	6.33 SB	43.65 PB	2:10.75 SB	6379 NR	6
Sveva Gerevini	Points	1072	978	686	999	953	737	954	6379 NR	6

=== Mixed ===
Track and road events

Athlete	Event	Semifinal		Final	
Athlete	Event	Result	Rank	Result	Rank
Luca Sito; Anna Polinari; Edoardo Scotti; Alice Mangione	4 × 100 metres relay	—		3:10.69; NR	2nd place, silver medalist(s)

== See also ==
- Italy at the European Athletics Championships
- Italy national athletics team
- Italian team at the running events
