= Brodie Young =

Brodie Young may refer to:

- Brodie Young (athlete), British sprinter
- Brodie Young, housemate at Australian TV series Big Brother
