= 2022 European Athletics Championships – Men's 400 metres =

Men's 400 metres at the 2022 European Athletics Championships
- Venue: Olympiastadion
- Location: Munich
- Dates: 15 August (round 1); 16 August (semifinals); 17 August (final)
- Competitors: 34 from 18 nations
- Winning time: 44.53

Medalists
gold medal	Matthew Hudson-Smith	Great Britain
silver medal	Ricky Petrucciani	Switzerland
bronze medal	Alex Haydock-Wilson	Great Britain

The men's 400 metres at the 2022 European Athletics Championships took place at the Olympiastadion on 15, 16 and 17 August.

== Records ==
Standing records prior to the 2022 European Athletics Championships
World record	Wayde van Niekerk (RSA)	43.03	Rio de Janeiro, Brazil	14 August 2016
European record	Thomas Schönlebe (GDR)	44.33	Rome, Italy	3 September 1987
Championship record	Iwan Thomas (GBR)	44.52	Budapest, Hungary	21 August 1998
World Leading	Michael Norman (USA)	43.56	Eugene, United States	25 June 2022
Europe Leading	Matthew Hudson-Smith (GBR)	44.35	Eugene, United States	28 May 2022

== Schedule ==
Date	Time	Round
15 August 2022	19:00	Round 1
16 August 2022	12:25	Semifinals
17 August 2022	21:42	Final

All times are local times (UTC+2)

== Results ==
=== Round 1 ===
First 3 in each heat (Q) and the next 3 fastest (q) advance to the Semifinals. The 9 highest ranked athletes received a bye into the semi-finals

Rank	Heat	Lane	Name	Nationality	Time	Note
1	2	5	Davide Re	Italy	45.26	Q, SB
2	2	7	Ricky Petrucciani	Switzerland	45.26	Q, SB
3	4	3	Thomas Jordier	France	45.39	Q, PB
4	1	8	Lionel Spitz	Switzerland	45.46	Q, PB
5	3	7	Benjamin Lobo Vedel	Denmark	45.50	Q, =NR
6	4	7	Patrick Schneider	Germany	45.58	Q
7	1	6	Patrik Šorm	Czech Republic	45.66	Q, SB
8	2	8	Boško Kijanović	Serbia	45.75	Q
9	2	3	João Coelho	Portugal	45.78	q
10	3	8	Gilles Biron	France	45.82	Q
11	1	7	Iñaki Cañal	Spain	45.83	Q, PB
12	4	8	Edoardo Scotti	Italy	45.87	Q
13	4	4	Pavel Maslák	Czech Republic	45.92	q, SB
14	4	3	Gustav Lundholm Nielsen	Denmark	46.05	q, SB
15	2	4	Joe Brier	Great Britain	46.06	
16	3	4	Matěj Krsek	Czech Republic	46.12	Q
17	3	5	Håvard Bentdal Ingvaldsen	Norway	46.18	SB
18	4	5	Manuel Guijarro	Spain	46.18	
19	2	6	Marvin Schlegel	Germany	46.19	
20	1	4	Manuel Sanders	Germany	46.21	
21	1	5	Lorenzo Benati	Italy	46.26	
22	2	2	Jochem Dobber	Netherlands	46.36	SB
23	1	3	Danylo Danylenko	Ukraine	46.39	SB
24	3	3	Óscar Husillos	Spain	46.42	
25	3	6	Šimon Bujna	Slovakia	46.79	

=== Semifinals ===
First 2 in each semifinal (Q) and the next 2 fastest (q) advance to the Final.

Rank	Heat	Lane	Name	Nationality	Time	Note
1	1	5	Matthew Hudson-Smith	Great Britain	44.98	Q
2	2	4	Thomas Jordier	France	45.37	Q, PB
3	3	6	Liemarvin Bonevacia	Netherlands	45.40	Q
4	2	5	Alex Haydock-Wilson	Great Britain	45.45	Q
5	2	3	Karol Zalewski	Poland	45.52	q
6	1	3	Ricky Petrucciani	Switzerland	45.55	Q
7	2	7	Lionel Spitz	Switzerland	45.56	q
8	1	8	João Coelho	Portugal	45.64	
9	1	2	Patrik Šorm	Czech Republic	45.66	
10	3	3	Dylan Borlée	Belgium	45.67	Q
11	1	4	Christopher O'Donnell	Ireland	45.73	
12	3	1	Gilles Biron	France	45.75	
13	1	6	Alexander Doom	Belgium	45.77	
14	1	7	Boško Kijanović	Serbia	45.88	
15	3	7	Patrick Schneider	Germany	45.92	
16	2	8	Matěj Krsek	Czech Republic	45.92	
17	3	4	Davide Re	Italy	46.02	
18	2	1	Iñaki Cañal	Spain	46.10	
19	1	1	Gustav Lundholm Nielsen	Denmark	46.30	
20	3	2	Pavel Maslák	Czech Republic	46.36	
21	2	2	Edoardo Scotti	Italy	46.49	
22	3	5	Mihai Sorin Dringo	Romania	47.06	
	2	6	Kevin Borlée	Belgium	DNF	
	3	8	Benjamin Lobo Vedel	Denmark	DNS	

=== Final ===
Rank	Lane	Name	Nationality	Time	Note
1st place, gold medalist(s)	4	Matthew Hudson-Smith	Great Britain	44.53	
2nd place, silver medalist(s)	8	Ricky Petrucciani	Switzerland	45.03	SB
3rd place, bronze medalist(s)	6	Alex Haydock-Wilson	Great Britain	45.17	
4	5	Liemarvin Bonevacia	Netherlands	45.17	SB
5	7	Dylan Borlée	Belgium	45.39	
6	1	Karol Zalewski	Poland	45.62	
7	2	Lionel Spitz	Switzerland	45.66	
8	3	Thomas Jordier	France	45.67	
