= 2025 European Athletics U23 Championships – Men's 400 metres =

Men's 400 metres at the 2025 European Athletics U23 Championships
- Venue: Fana Stadion
- Location: Bergen, Norway
- Dates: 17 July (heats); 18 July (semi-finals); 19 July (final)
- Competitors: 31 from 19 nations
- Winning time: 44.82 CR, NU23R

Medalists
gold medal	Jonas Phijffers	Netherlands
silver medal	Maksymilian Szwed	Poland
bronze medal	Brodie Young	Great Britain

The men's 400 metres event at the 2025 European Athletics U23 Championships was held in Bergen, Norway, at Fana Stadion on 17, 18 and 19 July.

== Records ==
Prior to the competition, the records were as follows:

Record	Athlete (nation)	Time (s)	Location	Date
European U23 record	Thomas Schönlebe (GDR)	44.33	Rome, Italy	3 September 1987
Championship U23 record	Ricky Petrucciani (SUI)	45.02	Tallinn, Estonia	10 July 2021

== Results ==
=== Heats ===
First 3 in each heat (Q) and the next 4 fastest (q) qualified for the semi-finals.

==== Heat 1 ====
Place	Athlete	Nation	Time	Notes
1	Maksymilian Szwed	Poland	45.77	Q
2	Markel Fernández	Spain	46.06	Q, SB
3	Tyrel Prenz	Germany	46.18	Q
4	Maj Janža	Slovenia	46.70	q, PB
5	Alexandru Gabriel Vochin	Romania	47.34	
6	Keenan Blake	Netherlands	48.50	
7	Probo Benvenuti	San Marino	49.43	
—	Matteo di Benedetto	Italy	DNF	

==== Heat 2 ====
Place	Athlete	Nation	Time	Notes
1	Jonas Phijffers	Netherlands	45.76	Q
2	Gerson Pozo	Spain	46.28	Q
3	Florian Kroll	Germany	46.49	Q
4	Mario Alexandru Dobrescu	Romania	46.70	q
5	Milan Ščibráni	Czech Republic	47.07	
6	Marko Orešković	Croatia	47.63	
7	Marcell Szilveszter	Hungary	47.78	

==== Heat 3 ====
Place	Athlete	Nation	Time	Notes
1	Felix Levasseur	France	45.78	Q, PB
2	Brodie Young	Great Britain	46.04	Q
3	Manuel Gerber	Switzerland	46.55	Q, PB
4	Sorin Voinea	Romania	46.71	q
5	Federico Falsetti	Italy	46.90	
6	Árpád Kovács	Hungary	46.94	
7	Max Husemann	Germany	47.20	
8	Franklin Henry	Slovakia	48.18	

==== Heat 4 ====
Place	Athlete	Nation	Time	Notes
1	David García Zurita	Spain	45.77	Q, PB
2	Andreas Grimerud	Norway	46.22	Q, SB
3	Luca Sito	Italy	46.31	Q
4	George John Franks	Greece	46.49	q
5	Balázs Plisz	Hungary	46.78	
6	Darijo BašIć Palković	Serbia	47.02	
7	Nabil Tezkratt	France	47.27	
8	Lukas Sutkus	Lithuania	47.28	

=== Semi-finals ===
First 3 in each heat (Q) and the next 2 fastest (q) will qualify for the final.

==== Heat 1 ====
Place	Athlete	Nation	Time	Notes
1	Jonas Phijffers	Netherlands	45.77	Q
2	Brodie Young	Great Britain	46.06	Q
3	Felix Levasseur	France	46.18	Q
4	Gerson Pozo	Spain	45.91	q
5	George John Franks	Greece	46.37	
6	Tyrel Prenz	Germany	46.68	
7	Sorin Voinea	Romania	46.81	
8	Manuel Gerber	Switzerland	47.18	

==== Heat 2 ====
Place	Athlete	Nation	Time	Notes
1	Maksymilian Szwed	Poland	45.39	Q
2	David García Zurita	Spain	45.46	Q, PB
3	Markel Fernández	Spain	46.22	Q
4	Florian Kroll	Germany	46.29	q, SB
5	Luca Sito	Italy	46.56	
6	Mario Alexandru Dobrescu	Romania	46.57	
7	Andreas Grimerud	Norway	46.62	
8	Maj Janža	Slovenia	46.77	

=== Final ===
Place	Athlete	Nation	Time	Notes
1st place, gold medalist(s)	Jonas Phijffers	Netherlands	44.82	CR, NU23R
2nd place, silver medalist(s)	Maksymilian Szwed	Poland	45.28	
3rd place, bronze medalist(s)	Brodie Young	Great Britain	45.34	PB
4	David García Zurita	Spain	45.43	PB
5	Felix Levasseur	France	46.00	
6	Markel Fernández	Spain	46.02	SB
7	Florian Kroll	Germany	46.36	
8	Gerson Pozo	Spain	46.53	
