= Mohamed Soudassi =

Italian sprinter (born 2006)

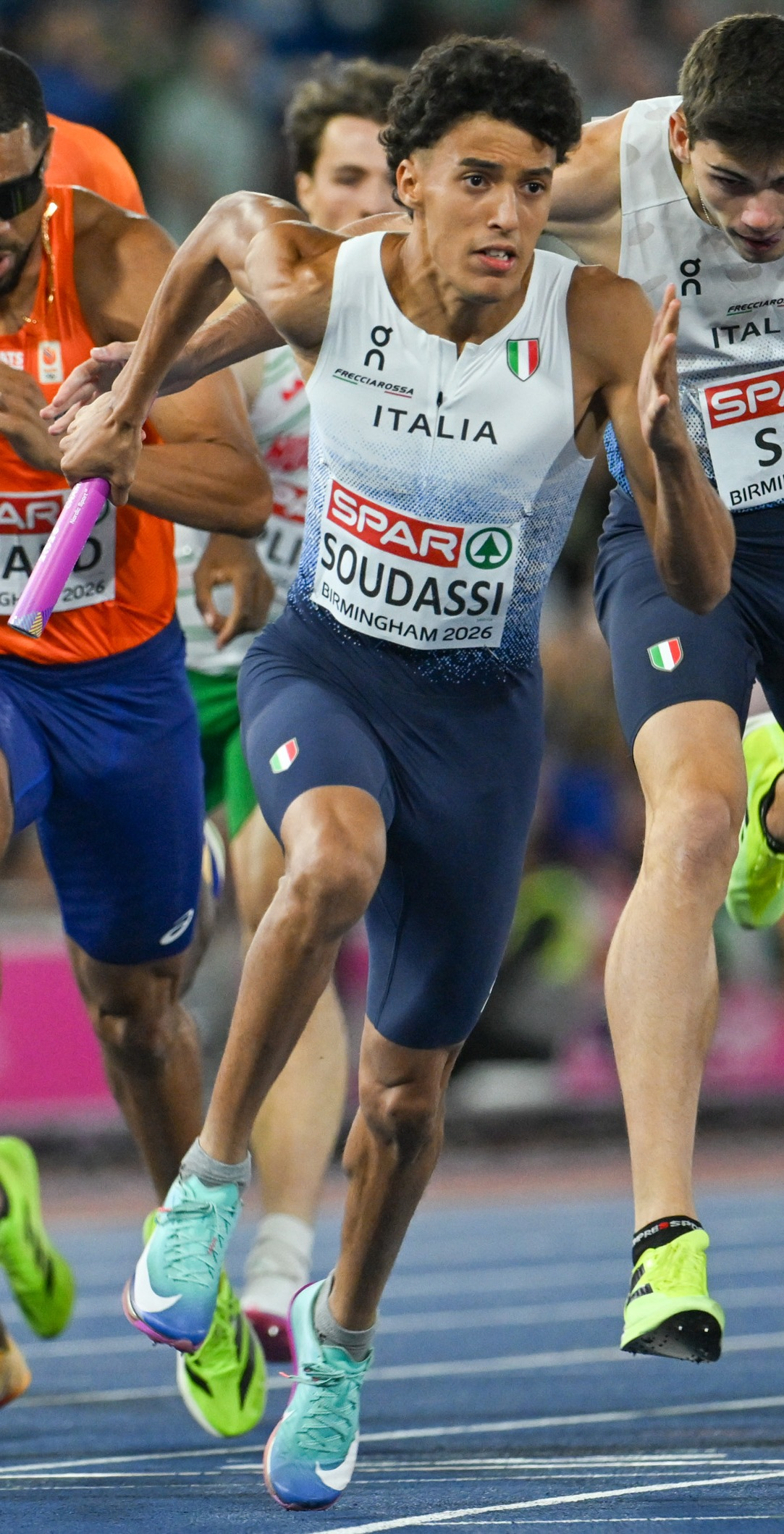
- Competing at the 2026 European Championships

Personal information
- Born: 22 November 2006 (age 19) Khouribga, Morocco

Sport
- Sport: Athletics
- Event: Sprint

Achievements and titles
- Personal best: 400 m: 45.10 (2026)
Medal record
Men's athletics
Representing Italy
European Championships
Gold medal – first place	2026 Birmingham	4 × 400 m relay

Mohamed Soudassi (born 22 November 2006) is an Italian sprinter. He was part of the Italy men's 4 × 400 metres team that set an Italian record and championships record at the 2026 European Athletics Championships.

== Biography ==
Born in Khouribga, Morocco, he moved to Sicily at an early age with his family. He grew up in Avola from the age of one year-old.

Soudassi took up athletics in 2022, He is a member of Atletica Avola and also trained in Solarino with Pasquale Aparo and Tonino Nastasi, then with Salvatore Dell'Aquila's Siracusatletica and then became coached by Pasquale Aparos. In July 2026, he became the Italian U23 champion in the 400 metres as 19 year-old. His winning time of 45.10 seconds moved him to fifth on the Italian all-time list, and second all-time in the Italian U23 category. He had entered the championships with a personal best of 46.26 seconds. Later that month, he placed sixth in the final of the 400 metres at the senior Italian Athletics Championships with 46.09 seconds.

Named in the Italian team for the 2026 European Athletics Championships in Birmingham, England, on the opening day of the championships he was part of the Italian team which placed sixth in the mixed 4 × 400 metres relay. On 14 August, Soudassi, Edoardo Scotti, Luca Sito and Lorenzo Benati were the Italian team which set a new championship record of 2:58.10 in the preliminary round of the men's 4 × 400 metres relay, bettering the 2:58.22 of Great Britain set in Split in 1990. The time also improved the Italian national record of 2:58.81 set in Tokyo at the Olympic Games in 2021.
