= 2024 European Athletics Championships – Mixed 4 × 400 metres relay =

Mixed 4 × 400 metres relay at the 2024 European Athletics Championships
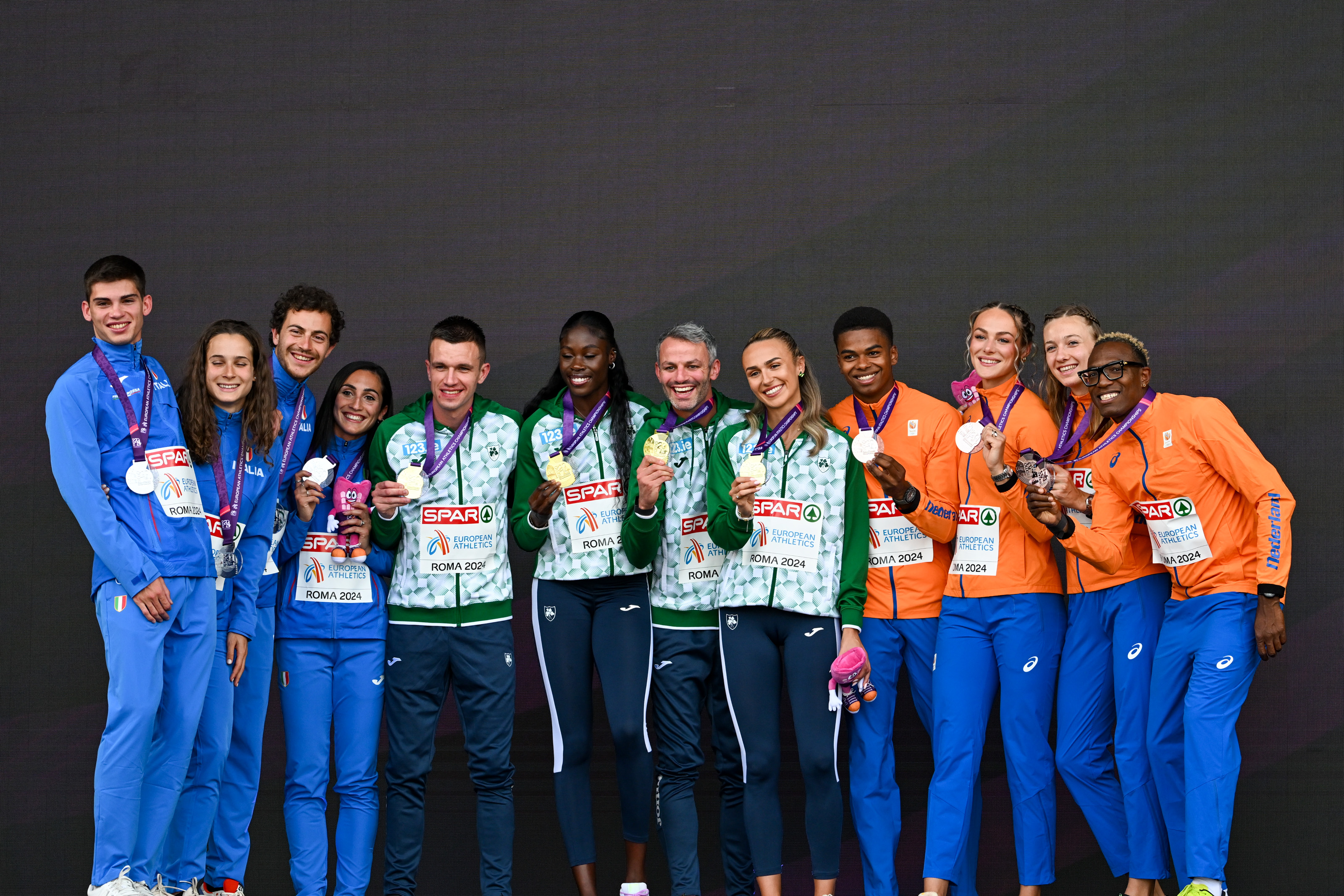
- Medaling teams from Italy (silver), Ireland (gold), and the Netherlands (bronze) at the medal ceremony
- Venue: Stadio Olimpico
- Location: Rome, Italy
- Dates: 7 June 2024 (final)
- Teams: 8 nations
- Winning time: 3:09.92 min CR NR

Medalists
gold medal	Christopher O'Donnell; Rhasidat Adeleke; Thomas Barr; Sharlene Mawdsley	Ireland
silver medal	Luca Sito; Anna Polinari; Edoardo Scotti; Alice Mangione	Italy
bronze medal	Liemarvin Bonevacia; Lieke Klaver; Isaya Klein Ikkink; Femke Bol	Netherlands

The mixed 4 × 400 metres relay at the 2024 European Athletics Championships took place over one race at the Stadio Olimpico in Rome, Italy, on 7 June 2024. It was the first time this mixed-sex relay event was contested at the European Athletics Championships. Relay teams of eight nations competed in the mandated order man–woman–man–woman.

The race was won by the Irish team in a championship record and national record of 3:09.92 minutes, followed by the Italian team in a national record of 3:10.69 minutes and then the Dutch team in 3:10.73 minutes. Outside the medals, the Belgian team also set a national record of 3:11.03 minutes. The French team was disqualified for a fault handing over the baton.

== Background ==
The mixed 4 × 400 metres relay was newly introduced to the European Athletics Championships at the 2024 edition, which was held at the 400-metres outdoor track at the Stadio Olimpico in Rome, Italy. In this mixed sex relay, each runner of the team completes one lap of the track in the running order man–woman–man–woman, which has been mandated since 2022.

Before the 2024 European Athletics Championships, the world record was 3:08.80 min, and the world leading time was 3:10.73 min. Both were set by the team of the United States, in 2023 and on 5 May 2024, respectively. The European record was 3:09.87 min, set by the team of Poland in 2021, and the European leading time was 3:11.45 min, set by the team of the Netherlands on 5 May 2024.

Records before to the 2024 European Athletics Championships
Record	Nation (athletes)	Time	Location	Date
World record	United States (Justin Robinson, Rosey Effiong, Matthew Boling, Alexis Holmes)	3:08.80	Budapest, Hungary	19 August 2023
European record	Poland (Karol Zalewski, Natalia Kaczamarek, Justyna Święty-Ersetic, Kajetan Duszyński)	3:09.87	Tokyo, Japan	31 July 2021
World leading	United States (Matthew Boling, Lynna Irby-Jackson, Willington Wright, Kendall Ellis)	3:10.73	Nassau, Bahamas	5 May 2024
Europe leading	Netherlands (Isayah Boers, Lieke Klaver, Isaya Klein Ikkink, Femke Bol)	3:11.45	Nassau, Bahamas	5 May 2024

== Qualification ==
For this event, eight national teams could qualify, half as many as for each of the men's and women's 4 × 400 metres relays. The Italian team automatically qualified, because Italy was the championships' host nation. The other seven teams qualified by the lowest sum of their fastest two results during the qualification period from 1 January 2023 to 26 May 2024.

== Final ==
The eight teams that qualified for the event competed in the final on 7 June. The race started at 22:20 (UTC+2) in the evening.

At the end of the opening leg, Luca Sito of Italy and Jonathan Sacoor of Belgium were the first to handover their batons. During the second leg, Anna Polinari of Italy and Naomi Van den Broeck of Belgium were passed by Rhasidat Adeleke of Ireland and Lieke Klaver of the Netherlands, and while Adeleke finished in the lead, Klaver fell back and was passed again by Polinari and Van den Broeck before the handover. During the third leg, Alexander Doom of Belgium passed Edoardo Scotti of Italy and Thomas Barr of Ireland within 100 metres and was first to hand over the baton; Isaya Klein Ikkink of the Netherlands handed over in fourth position. During the anchor leg, Sharlene Mawdsley of Ireland passed Helena Ponette of Belgium after 300 metres, and was followed by Alice Mangione of Italy who moved into second place; Femke Bol of the Netherlands also overtook Ponette shortly before the finish but didn't reach the other runners.

The race was won by the Irish team in a championship and national record of 3:09.92 min, followed by the Italian team in a national record of 3:10.69 min in second place and the Dutch team in 3:10.73 min in third place. In fourth place, the Belgian team set a national record of 3:11.03 min. Third-leg runner Doom had the fastest male split time of 44.15 s and anchor runner Bol had the fastest female split time of 49.21 s. The French team was disqualified for a fault handing over the baton outside the designated zone (TR24.7).

It was the first European gold medal for the Irish delegation since the 1998 European Athletics Championships. In an interview with the BBC, Barr said about the race: "This is just a phenomenal performance. We knew what we could do coming into this — we knew off the back of the World Relays that we had a really good shot. And it wasn't just any medal but if we really got it right on the day, which we did, we ended up with a championship record, close to a world record, and a gold, not just on the line. We took it by storm. This won't sink in for a while but we have to enjoy it. It does not come around that often. I'm a very, very happy athlete right now."

Results of the final
Rank	Lane	Nation	Athletes	Time	Notes
1st place, gold medalist(s)	7	Ireland	Christopher O'Donnell; Rhasidat Adeleke; Thomas Barr; Sharlene Mawdsley	3:09.92	CR, WL, NR
2nd place, silver medalist(s)	3	Italy	Luca Sito; Anna Polinari; Edoardo Scotti; Alice Mangione	3:10.69	NR
3rd place, bronze medalist(s)	5	Netherlands	Liemarvin Bonevacia; Lieke Klaver; Isaya Klein Ikkink; Femke Bol	3:10.73	SB
4	8	Belgium	Jonathan Sacoor; Naomi Van den Broeck; Alexander Doom; Helena Ponette	3:11.03	NR
5	6	Great Britain & N.I.	Charlie Carvell; Hannah Kelly; Lewis Davey; Emily Newnham	3:13.97	
6	9	Czech Republic	Matěj Krsek; Lada Vondrová; Vit Müller; Barbora Malíková	3:14.24	SB
7	2	Poland	Karol Zalewski; Marika Popowicz-Drapała; Maksymilian Szwed; Aleksandra Formella	3:15.32	
	4	France	Wilfried Happio; Sounkamba Sylla; Muhammad Abdallah Kounta; Louise Maraval	DQ	TR24.7
