= 2024 European Athletics Championships – Men's 400 metres =

Men's 400 metres at the 2024 European Athletics Championships
- Venue: Stadio Olimpico
- Location: Rome
- Dates: 8 June (round 1); 9 June (semifinals); 10 June (final)
- Competitors: 33 from 18 nations
- Winning time: 44.15 CR

Medalists
gold medal	Alexander Doom	Belgium
silver medal	Charlie Dobson	Great Britain
bronze medal	Liemarvin Bonevacia	Netherlands

The men's 400 metres at the 2024 European Athletics Championships took place at the Stadio Olimpico from 8 to 10 June.

== Records ==
Standing records prior to the 2024 European Athletics Championships
World record	Wayde van Niekerk (RSA)	43.03	Rio de Janeiro, Brazil	14 August 2016
European record	Matthew Hudson-Smith (GBR)	44.07	Oslo, Norway	30 May 2024
Championship record	Iwan Thomas (GBR)	44.52	Budapest, Hungary	21 August 1998
World Leading	Christopher Morales-Williams (CAN)	44.05	Gainesville, Florida, United States	11 May 2024
Europe Leading	Matthew Hudson-Smith (GBR)	44.07	Oslo, Norway	30 May 2024

== Schedule ==
Date	Time	Round
8 June 2024	11:45	Round 1
9 June 2024	20:38	Semifinals
10 June 2024	21:40	Final

All times are local times (UTC+2)

== Results ==
=== Round 1 ===
The next 14 fastest (q) advanced to the semifinals. The 10 highest ranked athletes received a bye into the semifinals.

==== Heat 1 ====
Rank	Lane	Athlete	Nation	Time	Notes
1	8	Jonathan Sacoor	Belgium	45.50	q
2	7	Edoardo Scotti	Italy	45.59	q
3	4	Téo Andant	France	45.65	q
4	5	Christopher O'Donnell	Ireland	45.69	q, SB
5	3	Karol Zalewski	Poland	45.80	q, SB
6	2	Ricky Petrucciani	Switzerland	45.90	q, SB
7	6	Matěj Krsek	Czech Republic	46.69	
–	9	Zoltán Wahl	Hungary	DNF	

==== Heat 2 ====
Rank	Lane	Athlete	Nation	Time	Notes
1	3	Lionel Spitz	Switzerland	45.37	q
2	4	Omar Elkhatib	Portugal	45.80	q
3	6	Alex Haydock-Wilson	Great Britain	46.04	R
4	7	Riccardo Meli	Italy	46.17	SB
5	9	Marc Koch	Germany	46.18	
6	5	Boško Kijanović	Serbia	46.39	
7	8	Patrik Šorm	Czech Republic	46.40	
8	2	Šimon Bujna	Slovakia	46.52	

==== Heat 3 ====
Rank	Lane	Athlete	Nation	Time	Notes
1	3	Luca Sito	Italy	45.12	q, EU23L
2	4	David Sombe	France	45.45	q, SB
3	6	Rok Ferlan	Slovenia	45.52	q, PB
4	5	Dylan Borlée	Belgium	45.62	q, SB
5	7	Gustav Lundholm Nielsen	Denmark	45.84	q, SB
6	9	Andreas Grimerud	Norway	45.90	q, =PB
7	8	Pavel Maslák	Czech Republic	47.99	

=== Semi-finals ===
The first 2 in each heat (Q) and the next 2 fastest (q) advance to the final. *Athletes that received a bye into the semifinal

==== Heat 1 ====
Rank	Lane	Athlete	Nation	Time	Notes
1	5	Luca Sito	Italy	44.75	Q, EU23L, NR
2	4	Jonathan Sacoor	Belgium	44.99	Q, PB
3	8	Attila Molnár*	Hungary	45.04	q, SB
4	6	Håvard Bentdal Ingvaldsen*	Norway	45.37	SB
5	7	Oleksandr Pohorilko*	Ukraine	45.41	
6	3	Ricky Petrucciani	Switzerland	45.47	SB
7	2	Rok Ferlan	Slovenia	45.63	
8	9	Téo Andant	France	45.72	

==== Heat 2 ====
Rank	Lane	Athlete	Nation	Time	Notes
1	8	Charlie Dobson*	Great Britain	44.65	Q
2	5	Jean Paul Bredau*	Germany	45.03	Q, SB
3	9	Lionel Spitz	Switzerland	45.28	q, SB
4	6	João Coelho*	Portugal	45.36	SB
5	4	David Sombe	France	45.36	SB
6	7	Dylan Borlée	Belgium	45.46	SB
7	2	Gustav Lundholm Nielsen	Denmark	46.01	
8	3	Andreas Grimerud	Norway	46.25	

==== Heat 3 ====
Rank	Lane	Athlete	Nation	Time	Notes
1	5	Alexander Doom*	Belgium	44.87	Q
2	6	Liemarvin Bonevacia*	Netherlands	45.17	Q, SB
3	9	Omar Elkhatib	Portugal	45.65	
4	8	Gilles Biron*	France	45.91	
5	4	Edoardo Scotti	Italy	45.92	
6	7	Manuel Sanders*	Germany	46.03	
7	2	Alex Haydock-Wilson	Great Britain	46.05	
–	3	Christopher O'Donnell	Ireland	TR17.2.3	
–		Karol Zalewski	Poland	DNS	

=== Final ===
The final started on 10 June at 21:40.

Rank	Lane	Athlete	Nation	Time	Notes
1st place, gold medalist(s)	8	Alexander Doom	Belgium	44.15	CR, NR
2nd place, silver medalist(s)	6	Charlie Dobson	Great Britain	44.38	PB
3rd place, bronze medalist(s)	9	Liemarvin Bonevacia	Netherlands	44.88	SB, EM35R
4	5	Jonathan Sacoor	Belgium	44.98	PB
5	7	Luca Sito	Italy	45.04	
6	3	Attila Molnár	Hungary	45.07	
7	4	Jean Paul Bredau	Germany	45.11	
8	2	Lionel Spitz	Switzerland	45.69	
