= Lionel Spitz =

Swiss sprinter (born 2001)

- Spitz in 2026

Personal information
- Nickname: Babyface Killer
- Born: 12 January 2001 (age 25) Adliswil, Zürich, Switzerland
- Height: 175 cm (5 ft 9 in)
- Weight: 65 kg (143 lb)

Sport
- Country: Switzerland
- Sport: Athletics
- Event: 400 metres
- Club: Adliswil Track Team
- Coached by: Alex Hautle

Achievements and titles
- Personal bests: 400 m: 45.01 (2024); Indoors; 400 m: 46.14 (Metz 2023)
Medal record
Men's athletics
Representing Switzerland
European U23 Championships
Silver medal – second place	2023 Espoo	400 m

Lionel Spitz (born 12 January 2001) is a Swiss sprinter who specialises in the 400 metres. He won a silver medal at the 2023 European U23 Championships. Shortly after, he set a new personal best of 45.25 at the Swiss Championships and also finished in first place at the event, securing his second national title.

== Early life and background ==
Lionel Spitz was born on 12 January 2001 in Adliswil, a small town in the canton of Zürich. He began his athletic career at a young age when he joined Adliswil Track Team in 2009. His mother, Lilly Spitz, is the chief coach of the club. He has an older brother, Linus, who runs for the club as well. Lionel remains with Adliswil Track Team, but his trainer is Alex Hautle from LAC TV Unterstrass in Zürich.

He jokingly describes himself as the "Babyface Killer" due to his boyish appearance and how often he gets mistaken for being much younger than he is. Originally, he wrote the name down when he was "too lazy to send [his] biography for the Swiss Athletics site". Ever since, the nickname stuck and has been widely adopted for him.

== Career ==
=== 2017 ===
Spitz made his international debut at the 2017 European Youth Olympic Festival in Győr, Hungary and finished in fourth place in the 400 metres. Then, he took part in the 2017 Swiss U18 Championships and earned the bronze medal after ending the 400 metres in third place.

=== 2018 ===
The following year, he would return to Győr once again to run in the 2018 European Athletics U18 Championships. Although he did not advance to the final rounds in the 400 metres, he still came in sixth place in the medley relay. He earned two additional gold medals for his performance at the 2018 Swiss U18 Championships in the 800 metres and the indoor 400 metres.

=== 2019–2020 ===
Next, he participated in the 2019 Swiss U20 Championships, where he won first place in the indoor and outdoor 400 metres. During the 2020 season, he had yet another successful year. He reclaimed his title at the Swiss U20 Championships and won second place at the Swiss Championships.

=== 2021 ===
He competed in the 2021 Swiss U23 Championships and was undefeated in the 400 metres. Prior to his victory, he came in fourth place at the 2021 Swiss Championships for the indoor and outdoor 400 metres.

He represented Switzerland also at the international level in the 2021 European Team Championships in Cluj-Napoca, Romania as well as the 2021 European U23 Championships in Tallinn, Estonia. He captured sixth place in the 400 metres and fourth place in the relay while at the European Team Championships. Despite his efforts at the European U23 Championships, he did not make it past the semi-finals in the 400 metres, nor did his team finish in the 4 × 400 metres relay. He was supposed to run the anchor leg of the race, however, a commotion caused his teammate to trip before Spitz could be passed the baton. The Swiss had the lead, but then, the Dutch athlete pushed his British competitor who in return tripped the Swiss runner.

=== 2022 ===
He became the Swiss champion for the first time in 2022. Additionally, he finished in second place at the Swiss Indoor Championships. The same year, he attended the 2022 European Championships in Munich, Germany and qualified for the final rounds in the 400 metres. However, the 4 × 400 metres relay group did not finish in the preliminary heat.

=== 2023 ===
Throughout 2023, he was selected for many major events, including the 2023 World Championships in Budapest, Hungary. He competed in the mixed 4 × 400 metres relay and ran the first leg of the race, however, he and his teammates failed to advance to the final rounds.

Previously, he and the entire mixed 4 × 400 metres relay team—comprising Ricky Petrucciani, Giulia Senn, and Julia Niederberger—broke the Swiss record in the category at the 2023 European Team Championships with a time of 3:14.22. Spitz came in tenth place at the event in the 400 metres.

He improved upon his last results at the 2023 European Indoor Championships in Istanbul, Turkey by going up three spots from his 13th-place ranking to tenth. As for the 4 × 400 metres relay at the 2023 European U23 Championships, they achieved a national U23 record with a time of 3:05.51.

== Achievements ==
Information from his World Athletics profile unless otherwise noted.

=== Personal bests ===
- 60 metres indoor — 7.02 (Magglingen 2023)

- 100 metres — 10.67 (+1.6 m/s, Zofingen 2023)
- 200 metres — 20.96 (+1.5 m/s, Zofingen 2023)
  - 200 metres indoor — 21.42 (St. Gallen 2023)
- 400 metres — 45.25 (Bellinzona 2023)
  - 400 metres indoor — 46.14 (Metz 2023)

=== International competitions ===
Year	Competition	Venue	Position	Event	Time	Notes
Representing Switzerland
2017	European Youth Olympic Festival	Győr, Hungary	4th	400 m	50.43	
2018	European U18 Championships	Győr, Hungary	15th (h)	400 m	49.66	
2018	European U18 Championships	Győr, Hungary	6th	Medley relay	1:55.98	
2021	European Team Championships First League	Cluj-Napoca, Romania	6th	400 m	47.16	
2021	European Team Championships First League	Cluj-Napoca, Romania	4th	4 × 400 m relay	3:05.31	(47.6 split)
2021	European U23 Championships	Tallinn, Estonia	16th (sf)	400 m	46.90	
2021	European U23 Championships	Tallinn, Estonia	— (f)	4 × 400 m relay	DNF	
2022	European Championships	Munich, Germany	7th	400 m	45.66	
2022	European Championships	Munich, Germany	— (h)	4 × 400 m relay	DNF	
2023	European Indoor Championships	Istanbul, Turkey	13th (h)	400 m	46.79	
2023	European Team Championships First Division	Chorzów, Poland	10th	400 m	45.81	
2023	European Team Championships First Division	Chorzów, Poland	8th	4 × 400 m relay mixed	3:14.22	NR
2023	European U23 Championships	Espoo, Finland	2nd	400 m	45.27	PB
2023	European U23 Championships	Espoo, Finland	5th	4 × 400 m relay	3:05.51	NU23R (44.54 split)
2023	World Championships	Budapest, Hungary	33rd (h)	400 m	45.69	
2023	World Championships	Budapest, Hungary	11th (h)	4 × 400 m relay mixed	3:14.398	(45.40 split)
2024	European Championships	Rome, Italy	8th	400 m	45.69	
2024	European Championships	Rome, Italy	–	4 × 400 m relay	DQ	
2024	Olympic Games	Paris, France	10th (rep)	400 m	45.51	
2025	European Indoor Championships	Apeldoorn, Netherlands	18th (h)	400 m	46.67	
2025	World Indoor Championships	Nanjing, China	10th (sf)	400 m	47.72	
2025	World Championships	Tokyo, Japan	37th (h)	400 m	45.57	
2026	European Championships	Birmingham, United Kingdom	14th (sf)	400 m	45.34	
2026	European Championships	Birmingham, United Kingdom	8th	4 × 400 m relay	3:02.78	

=== National championships ===
Year	Competition	Venue	Position	Event	Time	Notes
2017	Swiss U18 Championships	Winterthur	3rd	400 m	50.31	
2018	Swiss U18 Championships	Frauenfeld	1st	800 m	1:58.89	
2018	Swiss U18 Indoor Championships	St. Gallen	1st	400 m	50.68	
2019	Swiss U20 Championships	Winterthur	1st	400 m	48.63	
2019	Swiss U20 Indoor Championships	Magglingen	1st	400 m	50.00	
2020	Swiss U20 Championships	Frauenfeld	1st	400 m	47.41	
2020	Swiss Championships	Basel	2nd	400 m	47.34	
2021	Swiss Championships	Langenthal	4th	400 m	46.65	
2021	Swiss Indoor Championships	Magglingen	4th	400 m	47.76	PB SB
2022	Swiss Championships	Zürich	1st	400 m	45.71	
2022	Swiss Indoor Championships	Magglingen	2nd	400 m	47.33	PB SB
2023	Swiss Championships	Bellinzona	1st	400 m	45.25	PB SB
2023	Swiss Indoor Championships	St. Gallen	2nd	200 m	21.42	PB SB

== See also ==
- List of Swiss records in athletics
