= Håvard Bentdal Ingvaldsen =

Norwegian sprinter (born 2002)

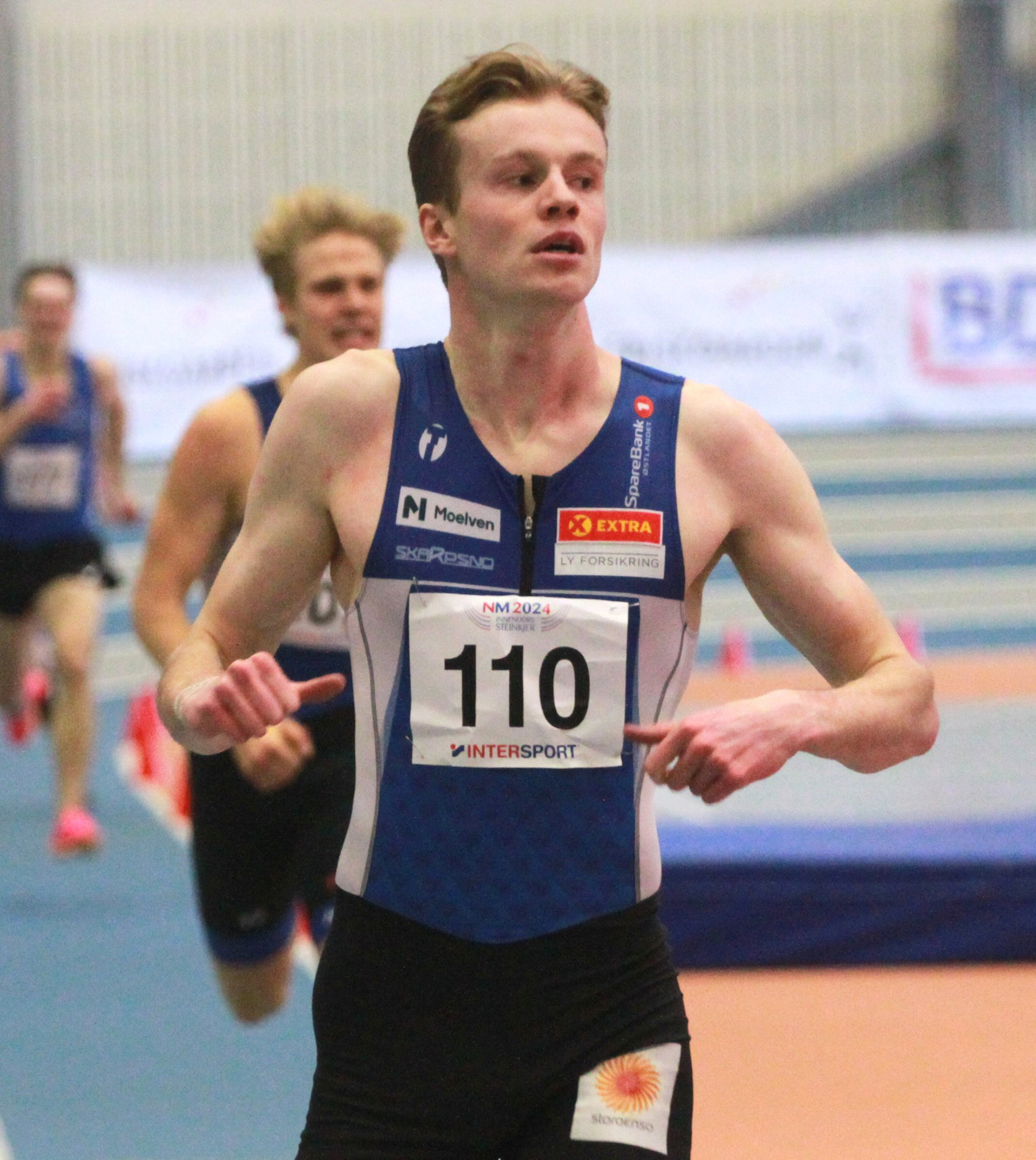
- Ingvaldsen in 2024

Personal information
- Nationality: Norwegian
- Born: 21 September 2002 (age 23)
- Home town: Moelv, Ringsaker Municipality, Norway

Sport
- Country: Norway
- Sport: Athletics
- Events: 200 metres, 400 metres
- Coached by: Mari Ann Bentdal

Achievements and titles
- Personal bests: 200 m: 20.68m (Jessheim 2021); 400 m: 44.39 (Budapest 2023) NR Indoors; 200 m: 22.38 (Stange 2021) 400 m: 46.50 (Steinkjer 2022)
Medal record
Men's athletics
Representing Norway
European Games
| Gold medal – first place | 2023 Kraków-Małopolska | 400 m |
European U23 Championships
| Gold medal – first place | 2023 Espoo | 400 m |
European U20 Championships
| Bronze medal – third place | 2021 Tallinn | 400 m |

Håvard Bentdal Ingvaldsen (born 21 September 2002) is a Norwegian track and field athlete. He has won multiple national championship titles over 200 metres and 400 metres. In 2023, he became the European U23 champion over 400m and took the Norwegian national 400m record from Karsten Warholm.

== Biography ==
At the 2021 European Athletics U20 Championships in Tallinn, he ran a new personal best time of 46.70 seconds in the final of the 400 metres to win a bronze medal. Later that summer, still aged 18 years-old, he recorded a national U20 record time of 45.95s as he won the 400m Norwegian Championships. He also ran the 400 meters during the 2022 European Athletics Championships in August 2022, in Munich but overall his 2022 season was hampered by injuries.

On 15 June 2023, he set a new personal best time of 44.86s for the 400m at the Diamond League event in Oslo. This also took the national record from Karsten Warholm. Ingvaldsen won gold at the 2023 European Team Championships in Chorzów in June 2023. He ran 44.88s which was a championship record for the European Team Championships format.

Competing at the 2023 European Athletics U23 Championships held from in July 2023 in Espoo, Finland, he won the gold medal in the 400m.

Competing at the 2023 World Athletics Championships in Budapest, he lowered his national record in the 400 metres to 44.39 to qualify for the semi final. He finished sixth overall in the final.

He competed at the 2024 Summer Olympics over 400 metres in August 2024, reaching the semi-finals.

In August 2026, he competed at the 2026 European Athletics Championships in Birmingham, England in the 400 metres.

== Achievements ==
Information from his World Athletics profile unless otherwise noted.

=== International competitions ===
| Year | Competition | Venue | Position | Event | Time | Notes |
Representing Norway
| 2021 | European Team Championships First League | Cluj-Napoca, Romania | 7th | 4 x 400 m relay | 3:08.42 | Final B (47.9 split) |
| 2021 | European U20 Championships | Tallinn, Estonia | 3rd | 400 m | 46.70 | PB |
| 2021 | European U20 Championships | Tallinn, Estonia | 8th | 4 x 400 m relay | 3:14.39 | |
| 2022 | World Indoor Championships | Belgrade, Serbia | 16th (h) | 400 m | 46.95 | |
| 2022 | European Championships | Munich, Germany | 17th (h) | 400 m | 46.18 | SB |
| 2023 | European Athletics Team Championships First Division | Chorzów, Poland | 1st | 400 m | 44.88 | CR |
| 2023 | European Athletics Team Championships First Division | Chorzów, Poland | DQ | 4 x 100 m relay | — | |
| 2023 | European Athletics Team Championships First Division | Chorzów, Poland | 10th | 4 x 400 m relay mixed | 3:15.67 | SB |
| 2023 | European U23 Championships | Espoo, Finland | 1st | 400 m | 45.13 | |
| 2023 | World Championships | Budapest, Hungary | 6th | 400 m | 45.08 | |
| 2024 | European Championships | Rome, Italy | 11th (sf) | 400 m | 45.37 | |
| 2024 | Olympic Games | Paris, France | 22nd (sf) | 400 m | 45.60 | |
| 2025 | European Indoor Championships | Apeldoorn, Netherlands | 11th (sf) | 400 m | 47.67 | |
| 2026 | European Championships | Birmingham, United Kingdom | 16th (h) | 400 m | 46.16 | |

=== National titles ===
- Norwegian Championships (2)
  - 200 metres: 2023
  - 400 metres: 2021 NU20R

== See also ==
- List of Norwegian records in athletics
- European Athletics Team Championships
