= Jonas Phijffers =

Dutch athlete (born 2003)

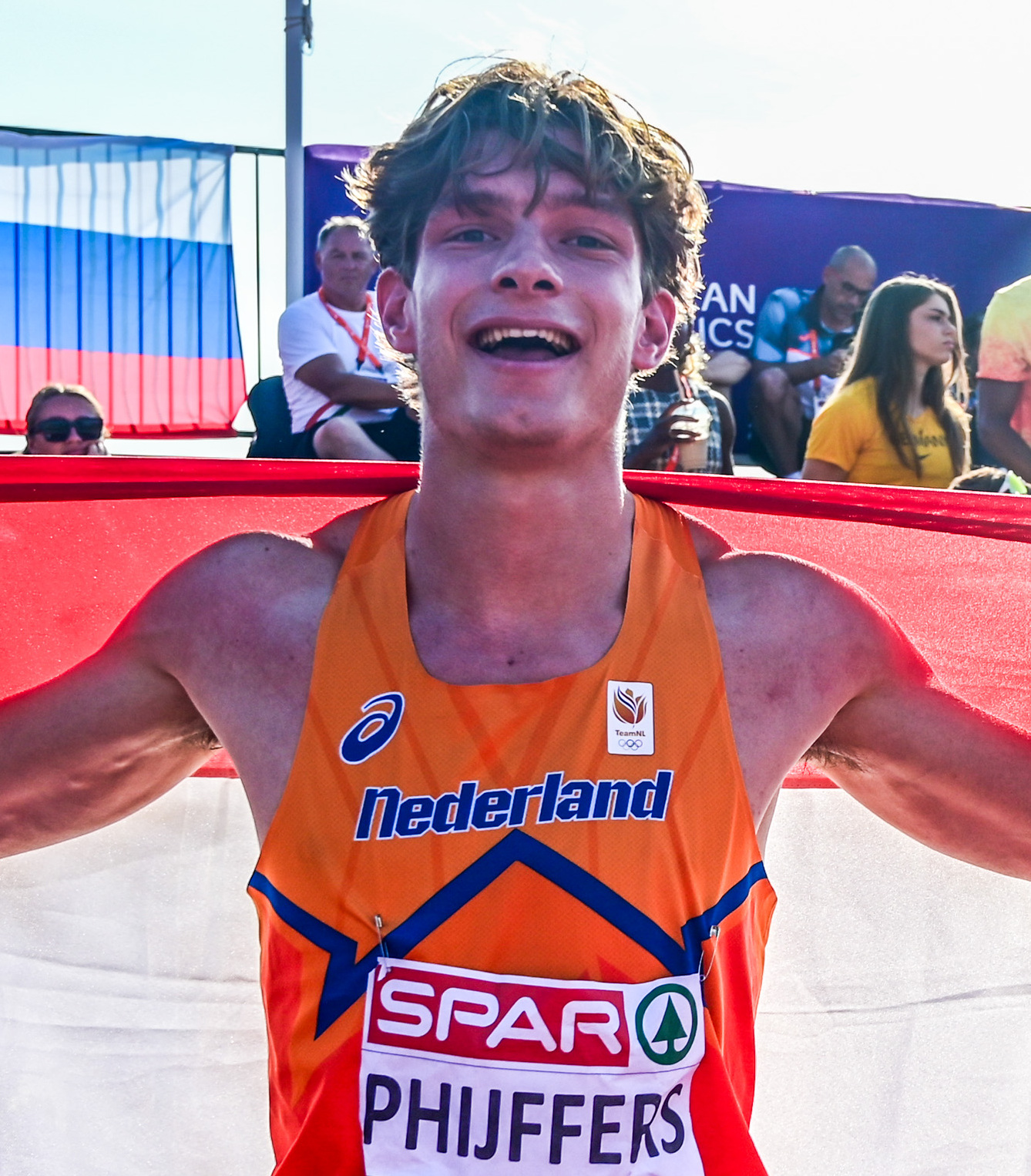
- Phijffers after winning the 400 metres at the 2025 European U23 Championships

Personal information
- Nationality: Dutch
- Born: 20 June 2003 (age 23)

Sport
- Sport: Athletics
- Event: Sprints
- Coached by: Betty Hofmeijer

Achievements and titles
- Personal bests: 400 m: 44.41 (2026, NR); 400 m sh: 45.35 (2026, NR)
Medal record
Men's athletics
Representing Netherlands
World Championships
Silver medal – second place	2025 Tokyo	4 × 400 m mixed
World Ultimate Championship
Third place	2026 Budapest	Mixed 4 × 400 m relay
European Championships
Bronze medal – third place	2026 Birmingham	400 m
Bronze medal – third place	2026 Birmingham	4 × 400 m relay
Bronze medal – third place	2026 Birmingham	4 × 400 m mixed
European U23 Championships
Gold medal – first place	2025 Bergen	400m

Jonas Phijffers (born 20 June 2003) is a Dutch sprinter. He competed over 400 metres at the 2025 European Athletics Indoor Championships and became European under-23 champion that year. He set a new the Dutch national indoor record of 45.35 seconds in February 2026.

== Biography ==
He is from Hellendoorn, and competed as a member of ASV Atletics in Nijverdal, as well as for Team Sotra in Apeldoorn. When he was 15 years-old, he competed as a multi-event athlete, placing second overall in the combined events competition in his age-group at The Open Gelders and Overijssels Athletics Championship in May 2018. He became Dutch U20 champion over 400 metres in 2021, and retained that title in 2022.

He competed at the 2023 European Athletics U23 Championships in Espoo, Finland in the 400 metres. He set a personal best of 45.38 seconds and won the silver medal at the Dutch Athletics Championships in 2024. He signed a professional contract with New Balance ahead of the 2025 indoor season.

He ran an indoors 400 metres personal best of 46.17 and then lowered it again to 45.90 seconds whilst competing in February 2025. However, at the senior Dutch Indoor Athletics Championships in Apeldoorn later that month, he went out fast to lead the 400 metres race after the first lap before being caught and eventually overtaken by the rest of the field to place sixth overall. He was selected for the 400 metres at the home 2025 European Athletics Indoor Championships, held in Apeldoorn. Competing at the championships, he ran 46.49 seconds to qualify from his heat into the semi-finals. In his semi-final, he finished fifth in his race in time of 46.89 seconds, and did not proceed to the final. He competed at the 2025 World Athletics Relays in China in the Men's 4 × 400 metres relay in May 2025. On 9 June 2025, he won in Hengelo and set a new Dutch U23 record of 44.93 seconds.

He was selected for the 400 metres at the 2025 European Athletics Team Championships in Madrid in June 2025, running 45.13 seconds to finish fifth in the first division. He ran a championship record of 44.82 seconds to win the gold medal in the 400 metres at the 2025 European Athletics U23 Championships in Bergen, Norway.

He was selected for the Dutch team for the 2025 World Athletics Championships in Tokyo, Japan, winning a silver medal in the mixed 4 × 400 metres relay. He then ran in the heats of the men's 400 metres without advancing to the semi-finals. He also ran at the championships in the men's 4 × 400 metres relay in both the preliminary round and the final.

Phijffers equalled the Dutch indoor national record with 45.48 for the 400 metres in Ostrava on 3 February 2026. Later that month, Phijffers set a new outright Dutch indoor record for the men's 400m, winning in Apeldoorn in 45.35 seconds. He won the Dutch indoor title in 45.57 seconds. In May, he competed in Poland and set a meeting record of 45.04 to win the 400m at the Irena Szewińska Memorial. In June, Phijffers won the 400m in 44.84 seconds at the FBK Games in Hengelo. On 10 August, he was part of the Dutch 4 × 400 m mixed relay team which won the bronze medal at the 2026 European Athletics Championships in Birmingham. On 11 August, Phijffers ran a personal best of 44.63 seconds in the semi-final of the 400 metres at the championships, before lowering it again the following day to win the bronze medal in the final with 44.41 seconds. Phijffers was a member of the Netherlands team which won the bronze medal in the men's 4 × 400 metres relay on the final day of the championships, 16 August.
