= Samuel Vessat =

French athlete (born 2002

Personal information
- Born: 1 May 2002 (age 24) Évry-Courcouronnes, France

Sport
- Country: France
- Sport: Athletics
- Event: Sprint

Achievements and titles
- Personal bests: 200m: 20.89 (2025); 400m: 44.24 (2026) NR; Indoor; 200m: 21.42 (2026); 400m: 45.30 (2026) NR

Samuel Vessat (born 1 May 2002) is a French sprinter. In 2026, he twice set new French national records in the 400 metres both indoors and outdoors in 2026, winning the French Athletics Championships for the first time that year.

== Biography ==
From Saint-Denis, Vessat was a basketball player, prior to taking up in athletics. The son of a basketball player, Vessat started playing basketball at the age of three years-old, and went on to play for Parisian club Levallois where he was coached by Ron Stewart, who had also previously coached Tony Parker and Joakim Noah. He moved to Ireland in 2021 after a move to a Canadian prep school was cancelled due to Covid-19 pandemic, and was based in Limerick, studying and playing at TUS Midwest, and declared for the 2022 NBA Draft.

Vessat moved to the United States to attend Edward Waters University in Jacksonville in 2023, and took up athletics in 2024 at the age of 22 years-old. Competing in the United States for Edward Waters University in 2025, Vessat he became the first student-athlete from that university to compete at the NCAA Division II Track and Field Championships having qualified for the championships with a personal best time of 47.35 for the 400 metres.

He transferred to at Purdue University in Indiana prior to the start of the 2026 indoor season. In February 2026, he set a personal best during his first indoor season of 45.68 seconds. Later that month, he set a French indoor national record in the 400 metres competing for Purdue at the Big Ten Indoor Championships in Indianapolis, running 45.38 seconds to break the previous record of 45.54 seconds set by Leslie Djhone in 2011. He placed sixth in the 400 m at the 2026 NCAA Indoor Championships in 45.30 seconds, lowering the French indoor national record for a second time.

Running outdoors the following month, Vessat set a new personal best of 44.94 to move to third on the French all-time list. In May, Vessat broke his personal best in the 400m with 44.82 seconds at the NCAA Regional Championships. On 12 June, he placed fourth in the 400 m final at the 2026 NCAA Outdoor Championships, running 44.47 seconds. On 26 July, Vessat set a new French national record of 44.24 seconds in winning the French Athletics Championships in Albi, surpassing the previous long-standing best set by Leslie Djhone. The time also moved him to fourth on the European all-time list. Competing at the 2026 European Athletics Championships in Birmingham, England in August, he was a semi-finalist in the 400 metres.
