= Maksymilian Szwed =

Polish athlete (born 2004)

Personal information
- Full name: Maksymilian Mariusz Szwed
- Nationality: Polish
- Born: 6 August 2004 (age 22)
- Education: Łódź University of Technology

Sport
- Sport: Athletics
- Event: Sprint

Achievements and titles
- Personal best: 400 m: 44.94 (2026) NU23R
Medal record
Men's athletics
Representing Poland
World University Games
Gold medal – first place	2025 Bochum	4 × 400 m relay
European Indoor Championships
Silver medal – second place	2025 Apeldoorn	400 m
European U23 Championships
Silver medal – second place	2025 Bergen	400 m
European U20 Championships
Bronze medal – third place	2023 Jerusalem	400 m

Maksymilian Szwed (born 6 August 2004) is a Polish sprinter. He became Polish national 400 metres champion in 2024. He set new European U23 and Polish national indoor records to win the silver medal at that distance at the 2025 European Athletics Indoor Championships.

== Biography ==
Szwed is a ADS Łódź athlete. was a bronze medalist in the 400 metres at the 2023 European Athletics U20 Championships in Jerusalem.

Szwed competed as part of the Polish mixed 4 × 400 m relay team at the World Relays in Nassau, Bahamas which qualified for the Paris Olympics.

Szwed ran at the 2024 European Athletics Championships in Rome in June 2024, in both the Mixed 4 × 400 metres relay and the Men's 4 × 400 metres relay. He won the Polish Athletics Championships over 400 metres in Bydgoszcz in June 2024 in a time of 45.25 seconds and broke the 20-year-old Polish Under-23 Record of Marek Plawgo.

Szwed ran in the Mixed 4 × 400 m relay at the 2024 Paris Olympics. He also competed in the men's 4 × 400 m relay at the Games.

Szwed ran an indoors personal best of 45.69 to qualify for the semi finals of the 400 metres at the 2025 European Athletics Indoor Championships. He won his semi-final on 7 March 2025, with a time of 45.78 seconds. He subsequently went faster again to win the silver medal in the final, setting a European U23 and Polish indoor record of 45.31 seconds to finish behind only Atilla Molnar of Hungary. He competed at the 2025 World Athletics Relays in China in the Men's 4 × 400 metres relay in May 2025. He also competed in the Mixed 4 × 400 metres relay at the event.

Szwed represented Poland at the 2025 European Athletics Team Championships First Division in Madrid, where he ran a personal best 45.18 seconds for the 400 metres and was a member of the Polish mixed 4 × 400 metres relay team which set a national record in winning the race. He ran 45.28 seconds to win the silver medal in the 400 metres at the 2025 European Athletics U23 Championships in Bergen, Norway.

Szwed was selected for the Polish team for the 2025 World Athletics Championships in Tokyo, Japan, where he ran in the mixed 4 × 400 metres relay in which the Polish team finished in fourth place. He also ran in the heats of the men's 400 metres without advancing to the semi-finals.

Szwed ran below 45 seconds for the first time in the 400 m in June 2026, with 44.94 seconds, a new Polish U23 record. Competing at the 2026 European Athletics Championships in Birmingham, England in August, he was a finalist in the 400 metres, placing sixth overall. He also competed in the men's 4 × 400 metres relay at the championships.
