= Luca Sito =

Italian sprinter

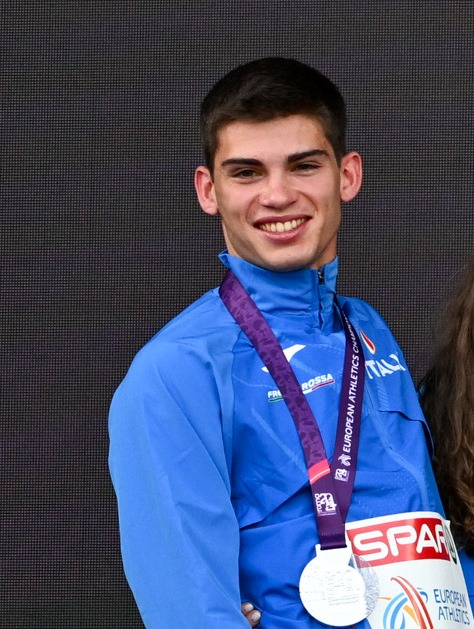

Personal information
- Nationality: Italian
- Born: 12 May 2003 (age 23) Milan, Italy

Sport
- Sport: Athletics
- Event: Sprint

Achievements and titles
- Personal bests: 200 m: 20.72 (2024); 400 m: 44.75 NR (2024)
Medal record
Men's athletics
Representing Italy
European Championships
Gold medal – first place	2026 Birmingham	4 × 400 m relay
Silver medal – second place	2024 Rome	4 × 400 m relay
Silver medal – second place	2024 Rome	4 × 400 m mixed
Mediterranean Games
Bronze medal – third place	2026 Taranto	4 × 400 m relay
European U23 Championships
Gold medal – first place	2023 Espoo	4 × 400 m relay

Luca Sito (born 12 May 2003) is an Italian sprinter. He won the gold medal as part of the Italian men's 4 x 400 m relay at the 2026 European Athletics Championships in Birmingham and two silver medals in the mixed 4 × 400 m relay team and the men's 4 × 400 m relay at the 2024 European Athletics Championships in Rome.

== Early life ==
He was born and raised in San Felice in Segrate in the Metropolitan City of Milan, although he has family from Naples. He was a keen football player, and would play on the wing, before focusing on athletics in 2020. He later moved to San Donato Milanese, where he came under the coaching of Antonio Cecconi.

== Career ==
He was a gold medalist in the 4 × 400 m at the 2023 European Athletics U23 Championships in Espoo alongside Lorenzo Benati, Francesco Domenico Rossi, Riccardo Meli, Matteo Raimondi, and Andrea Panassidi. Despite being the youngest member of the team, he also came close to the individual final, missing out a place by just 4 hundredths of a second.

In April 2024, he lowered his personal best for the 400 metres to 45.65 in Florence. He ran as part of the Italian 4 × 400 m relay team at the World Relays Championships in Nassau, Bahamas in May 2024. That month, he ran a 45.35 personal best for the 400 metres in Montreuil.

Competing at the 2024 European Athletics Championships in Rome, he was a silver medalist in the Mixed 4 × 400 m relay. He also reached the final of the Men's 400 metres with a time of 44.75 seconds. In the final he placed fifth overall.

He ran a personal best 20.72 seconds for the 200 metres in finishing third at the 2024 Italian Athletics Championships. He competed at the 2024 Summer Olympics over 400 metres in August 2024, reaching the semi-final. He also competed in the men's 4 × 400 m relay and mixed 4 × 400 m relay at the Games.

In January 2025 in Ancona, he ran an indoor lifetime best of 46.44 to move into the Italian indoor all-time top-10. He was selected for the 2025 European Athletics Indoor Championships in Apeldoorn, but did not reach the semi-finals of the 400 metres.

He was selected for the Italian team for the 2025 World Athletics Championships in Tokyo, Japan, running in the mixed 4 × 400 metres relay. He also ran in the heats of the men's 400 metres without advancing to the semi-finals.

Named in the Italian team for the 2026 European Athletics Championships in Birmingham, England, on the opening night of the championships he was part of the Italian team which placed sixth in the mixed 4 × 400 metres relay. On 14 August, Sito, Edoardo Scotti, Mohamed Soudassi and Lorenzo Benati were the Italian team which set a new championship record of 2:58.10 in the preliminary round of the men's 4 × 400 metres relay, bettering the 2:58.22 of Great Britain set in Split in 1990. The time also improved the Italian national record of 2:58.81 set in Tokyo at the Olympic Games in 2021.

== See also ==
- Italian records in athletics
- Italian all-time lists - 400 metres
