= Mihai Dringo =

Romanian athlete (born 2001)

Mihai Sorin Dringo
Personal information
- Born: 6 November 2001 (age 24) Municipiul Beiuș

Sport
- Sport: Athletics
- Event: Sprint

Achievements and titles
- Personal bests: 400m: 44.74 (Maribor, 2025) NR
Medal record
Men's athletics
Representing ROM
Summer World University Games
Bronze medal – third place	2021 Chengdu	400 m

Mihai Sorin Dringo (born 6 November 2001) is a Romanian sprinter. He is a multiple-time national champion and the national record holder over 400 metres.

== Biography ==
From Beiuș, in Bihor County, he is a member of CSU CSM Oradea. He is coached by Robert Olah. He finished third over 400 metres and 200 metres at the Romanian Athletics Championships in June 2021. He finished fifth in the final at the 2021 European Athletics U23 Championships over 400 metres in Tallinn, Estonia.

He won the Romanian national indoor title over 400 metres in February 2022. He competed for Romania at the 2022 World Athletics Indoor Championships in the men's 4 × 400 metres relay. In doing so, he became the first athlete from the CSU CSM Oradea to compete at the World Championships. In June 2022, he became the Balkan outdoor champion and won the Romanian Athletics Championships, and broke the Romanian national record for 400 metres, running a time of 45.38 seconds. He ran in the semi-finals of the 400 metres at the 2022 European Athletics Championships in Munich.

He retained the Romanian national indoor championship title over 400 metres in February 2023. He was subsequently selected for the 2023 World Athletics Indoor Championships in Istanbul, but did not progress to the semi-finals. He retained his Romanian outdoor 400 metres national tile in July 2023. He finished fourth overall in the 400 metres at the 2023 European Athletics U23 Championships in Espoo, Finland. He was a bronze medalist over 400 metres at the World University Games in Changdu in August 2023, lowering the Romanian national record to 45.27 seconds.

He missed several months in 2024 due to injury which required two surgeries, but returned to competitive action for the 2025 outdoor season. He ran a new Romanian national record of 44.88s over 400m in Geneva in June 2025. He lowered the national record again to 44.74 seconds at the 2025 European Athletics Team Championships Second Division in Maribor on 28 June.

In September 2025, he competed at the 2025 World Athletics Championships in Tokyo, Japan, running in the heats of the men's 400 metres without advancing to the semi-finals.

Competing at the 2026 European Athletics Championships in Birmingham, England in August, he was a semi-finalist in the 400 metres.

== Personal life ==
He studied at the Faculty of Physical Education and Sports of the University of Oradea.
