= Yann Spillman =

French sprinter (born 2002)

Personal information
- Born: 15 July 2002 (age 24)

Sport
- Sport: Athletics
- Event: Sprint

Achievements and titles
- Personal bests: 400m: 44.92 (2026); Indoors; 400m: 46.18 (2025)

Yann Spillman (born 15 July 2002) is a French sprinter who primarily competes over 400 metres. He represented France at the 2025 World Athletics Championships and was part of the French 4 x 400m relay team which set an indoor national record at the 2025 European Athletics Indoor Championships.

== Biography ==
Spillman was runner-up over 400 metres in the U23 French Championships in 2022. He made his international debut in a French vest at the 2023 European Athletics U23 Championships in Espoo, Finland.

Spillman won the 200 metres and the 400 metres, in 46.59 seconds, at the Rhône Valley Indoor Championships in January 2024. He ran an indoor 400 metres personal best in February 2024 in Lyon of 46.49 seconds. He had a second place finish in the 400 metres at the 2024 French Indoor Athletics Championships in Miramas. He ran for France in the final of the Mixed 4x400m relay at the 2024 World Relays Championships in Nassau, Bahamas. He was a member of the French relay team which finished fourth in the 4x400m relay at the 2024 European Athletics Championships in Rome. He was selected for the French relay pool for the 2024 Olympic Games, although he did not race at the Games.

Spillman set a new indoor 400 metres personal best in Aubiere in January 2025, of 46.18 seconds. He was part of the French 4x400m team which set a national record in finishing fifth at the 2025 European Athletics Indoor Championships in Apeldoorn, Netherlands. He lowered his outdoor personal best to 45.78 seconds in Oyonnax in June 2025. Later that month, he represented France at the 2025 European Athletics Team Championships in Madrid, Spain. He was selected for the French team for the 2025 World Athletics Championships in Tokyo, Japan, running in the men's 4 x 400 metres relay.

On 26 July, he ran a new personal best of 44.92 seconds in placing third in the 400 m at the French Athletics Championships in Albi. He had earlier also ran a new personal best of 45.06 seconds in the preliminary round the previous day. Competing at the 2026 European Athletics Championships in Birmingham, England in August, he was a semi-finalist in the 400 metres. He also competed in the men's 4 × 400 metres relay at the championships.

== Personal life ==
He is from Carspach in the Haut-Rhin department in Alsace, France. He studied for a Global BBA at ESSEC Business School in Lyon. He had an internship at an investment bank in 2024.
