= Brodie Young (athlete) =

British athlete (born 2003)

Personal information
- Nationality: British (Scottish)
- Born: 28 February 2003 (age 23)

Sport
- Sport: Athletics
- Event: 400 metres

Achievements and titles
- Personal bests: 200m: 20.75 (Albuquerque, 2026); 400m: 45.24 (Fayetteville, 2026)
Medal record
Men's athletics
Representing Great Britain
European U23 Championships
Bronze medal – third place	2025 Bergen	400m
Gold medal – first place	2023 Espoo	4x400m relay
European Athletics U20 Championships
Bronze medal – third place	2021 Tallinn	4x400 m relay

Brodie Young (born 28 February 2003) is a British track and field athlete who competes as a sprinter. In 2025, he became Scottish indoor record holder over 400 metres.

== Early life ==
Young is from Chryston, in Scotland. In 2022, he started the first year of a four-year scholarship at the University of New Mexico.

== Career ==
A member of the Airdrie Harriers, Young won back-to-back Scottish Senior Championship gold medals in the 400 metres in 2021 and 2022. He was a member of the gold medal winning 4 × 400 m team at the European Athletics U20 Championships in Tallinn in 2021. He represented Great Britain at the World Athletics U20 Championships in Cali, Colombia, in August 2022.

He ran a personal best time of 45.82 time for the 400 metres in Clovis, California in 2023. He was selected for the British team for the European Team Games in Silesia in June 2023. He was a member of the bronze medal winning 4 × 400 m team at the European Athletics U23 Championships in Espoo in 2023, and ran in the 400 metres individual race.

In April 2024, he was selected as part of the British team for the 2024 World Athletics Relays in Nassau, Bahamas. He ran at the championships as the British mixed 4 × 400 m team qualified for the 2024 Paris Olympics.

In February 2025, he ran a time of 45.96 for an indoor 400m run in Albuquerque to best the 400m Scottish Indoor Record set by Brian Whittle who had run 45.98 in Hungary in 1988. He lowered it again the following week at the Don Kirby Invitational in Albuquerque. His time of 45.66 lower by 0.3s from the record he set the previous week.

He ran a 45.34 seconds personal best to win the bronze medal in the 400 metres at the 2025 European Athletics U23 Championships in Bergen, Norway. In October 2025, he was named on the British Athletics Olympic Futures Programme for 2025/26.

Young competed in the 400 metres at the 2026 Commonwealth Games in Glasgow, Scotland. He also competed in the mixed 4 × 400 m relay at the Games.
