= Jack Raftery =

Irish sprinter

Personal information
- Nationality: Irish
- Born: 26 April 2001 (age 25) Dublin, Ireland
- Height: 201 cm (6 ft 7 in)

Sport
- Country: Ireland
- Sport: Track and field
- Events: 400 m, 300 m, 4 × 400 metres relay
- Club: Donore Harriers
- Coached by: Brian Coombes, John & Emily Geoghehan, Paul Clarkin

Achievements and titles
- Personal bests: 400 m: 44.98 s 800 m: 1:55.68; 300 m (indoor): 33.27 s NR

Jack Raftery (born 26 April 2001) is an Irish track and field athlete competing in sprinting events. He holds an Irish record for the indoor 300 metres.

== Career ==
He attended Castleknock College. He currently attends Dublin City University. He is a member of the Donore Harriers club.

Raftery ran in the 400 metres at the 2023 European Athletics Team Championships Third Division (part of the 2023 European Games). He also ran in the mixed 4×400 relay at the 2023 World Athletics Championships, where the Irish team finished sixth.

In 2024, he went to the Paris 2024 Summer Olympics as a non-running member of the 4 × 400 m mixed relay team.

In June 2025, at the 2025 European Athletics Team Championships in Maribor, Raftery moved to second in the Irish all-time list clocking a time of 44.98.
