= Edoardo Scotti =

Italian sprinter (born 2000)

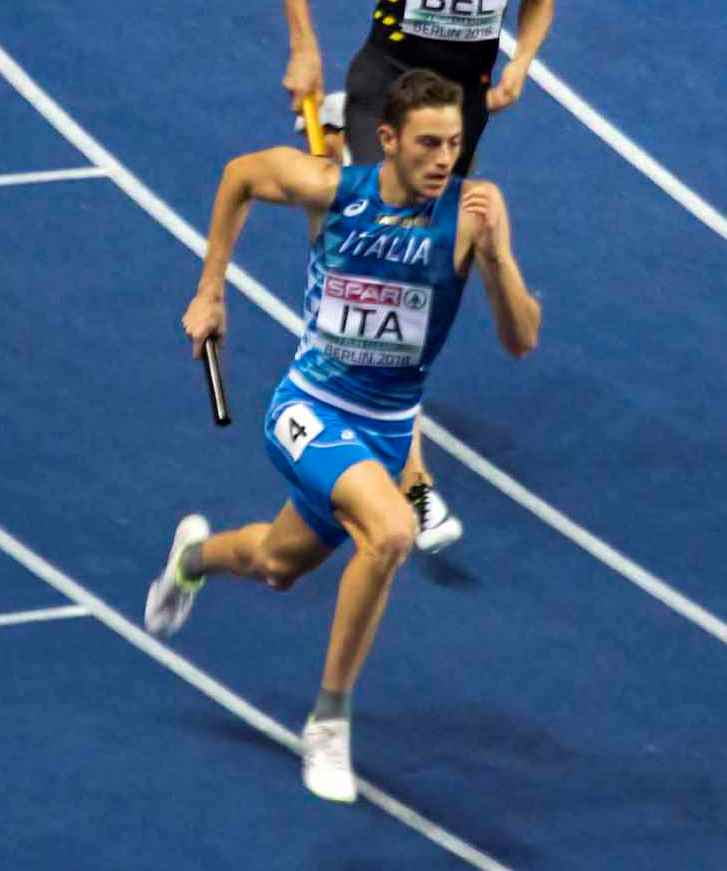
- Scotti at the 2018 European Championships.

Personal information
- National team: Italy: 7 caps (2019-2021)
- Born: 9 May 2000 (age 26) Lodi, Italy
- Height: 1.87 m (6 ft 2 in)
- Weight: 70 kg (154 lb)

Sport
- Sport: Athletics
- Event: 400 metres
- Club: CUS Parma; Centro Sportivo Carabinieri
- Coached by: Giacomo Zilocchi; Silvia Gandini (Physiotherapist-Osteopath)

Achievements and titles
- Personal best: 400 m: 44.45 (2025)
Medal record
Senior level
World Athletics Relays
Gold medal – first place	2021 Silesia	4 × 400 m mixed
European Championships
Gold medal – first place	2026 Birmingham	4 × 400 m relay
Silver medal – second place	2024 Rome	4 × 400 m relay
Silver medal – second place	2024 Rome	4 × 400 m mixed
World University Games
Bronze medal – third place	2025 Bochum	400 m
Youth level
European U23 Championships
Bronze medal – third place	2021 Tallinn	400 m
Mediterranean U23 Championships
Gold medal – first place	2018 Jesolo	4 × 400 m relay
World U20 Championships
Gold medal – first place	2018 Tampere	4 × 400 m relay
European U20 Championships
Gold medal – first place	2019 Borås	400 m
Gold medal – first place	2017 Grosseto	4 × 400 m relay

Edoardo Scotti (born 9 May 2000) is an Italian male 400 meter dash runner, who won a gold medal at the 2018 IAAF World U20 Championships and was a finalist at the 2018 European Athletics Championships with the Italian national track relay team. He competed at the 2020 Summer Olympics, in 400 m.

== Personal bests ==
Outdoor

- 400 metres: 44.45 ( (Italy) Tokyo, 14 September 2025)

== Achievements ==
Year	Competition	Venue	Position	Event	Time	Notes
2017	European U20 Championships	Grosseto	1st	4 × 400 m relay	3:08.68	WJL
2018	World U20 Championships	Tampere	4th	400 metres	46.20	NJR
2018	World U20 Championships	Tampere	1st	4 × 400 m relay	3:04.05	WJL, AJR
2018	European Championships	Berlin	6th	4 × 400 m relay	3:02.34	
2019	European U20 Championships	Borås	1st	400 metres	45.85	SB
2019	European U20 Championships	Borås	4th	4 × 400 m relay	3:08.76	
2021	Olympic Games	Tokyo, Japan	27th (h)	400 m	45.71	
2021	Olympic Games	Tokyo, Japan	7th	4 × 400 m relay	2:58.81	
2022	European Championships	Munich, Germany	21st (sf)	400 m	46.49	
2022	European Championships	Munich, Germany	8th	4 × 400 m relay	3:03.04	
2023	World Championships	Budapest, Hungary	7th	4 × 400 m relay	3:01.23	
2024	Olympic Games	Paris, France	7th	4 × 400 m relay	2:59.72	
2026	European Championships	Birmingham, United Kingdom	14th (sf)	400 m	45.32	
2026	European Championships	Birmingham, United Kingdom	1st	4 × 400 m relay	2:59.16	

== National titles ==
Scotti has won four national championships at individual senior level.

- Italian Athletics Championships
  - 400 m: 2020, 2021, 2022
- Italian Athletics Indoor Championships
  - 400 m: 2024

== See also ==
- Italy at the 2018 European Athletics Championships
- List of European junior records in athletics
