= Lorenzo Benati =

Italian sprinter (born 2002)

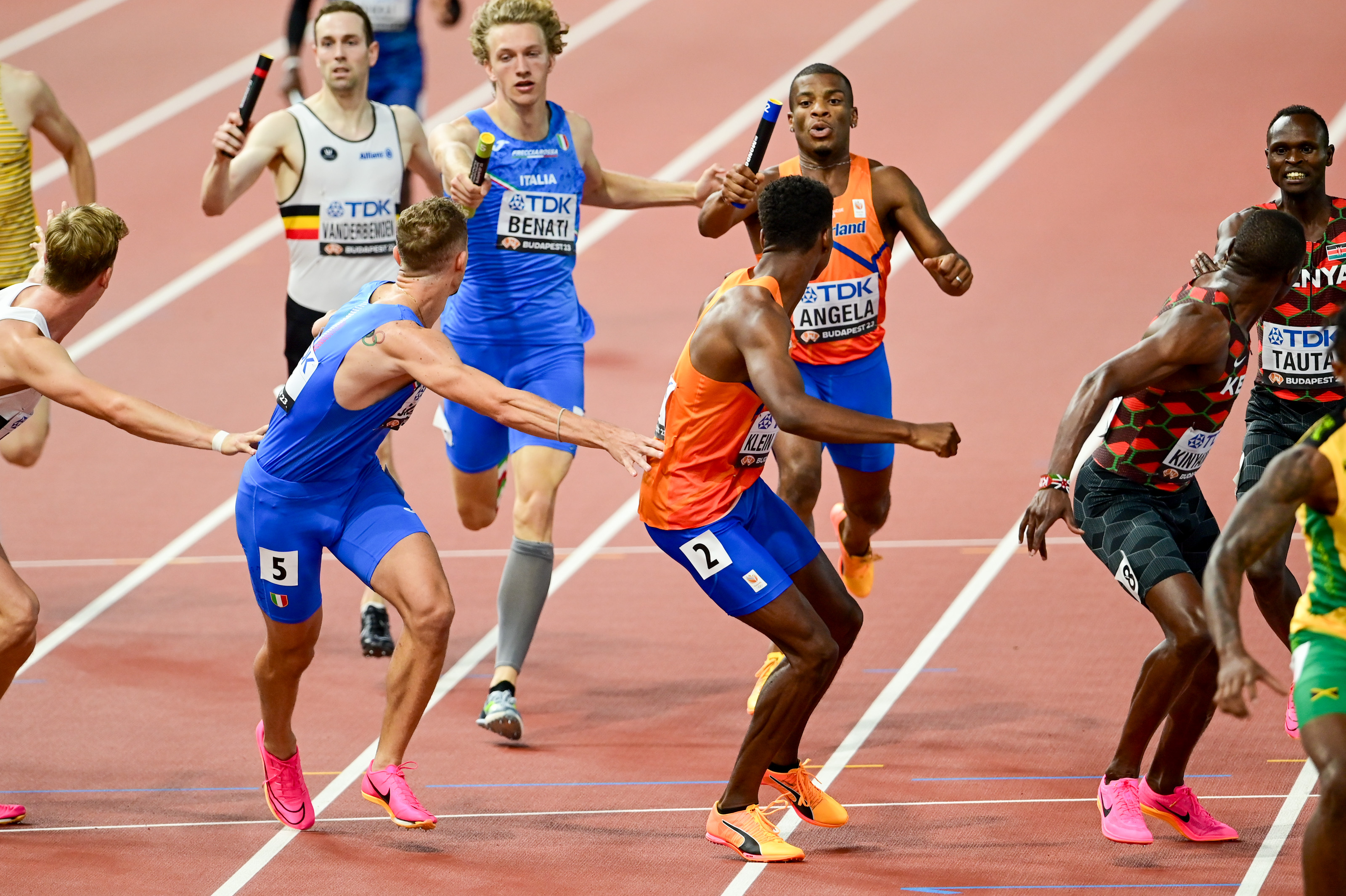
- Benati (in blue jersey with the baton) at Budapest 2023.

Personal information
- National team: Italy
- Born: 5 April 2002 (age 24) Rome, Italy
- Height: 1.97 m (6 ft 6 in)
- Weight: 84 kg (185 lb)

Sport
- Sport: Athletics
- Event: 400 m
- Club: G.S. Fiamme Azzurre
- Coached by: Mario Benati

Achievements and titles
- Personal best: 400 m: 45.34 (2026)
Medal record
Men's athletics
Representing Italy
European Championships
Gold medal – first place	2026 Birmingham	4 × 400 m relay
World U20 Championships
Gold medal – first place	2018 Tampere	4 × 400 m relay
European U23 Championships
Gold medal – first place	2023 Espoo	4 × 400 m relay
European U20 Championships
Silver medal – second place	2021 Tallinn	400 m
Silver medal – second place	2021 Tallinn	4 × 400 m relay
European U18 Championships
Gold medal – first place	2018 Győr	400 m
Gold medal – first place	2018 Győr	Medley relay
Mediterranean Games
Bronze medal – third place	2026 Taranto	400 m

Lorenzo Benati (born 5 April 2002) is an Italian sprinter, selected to be part of the Italian athletics team for the Tokyo 2020 Olympics, as a possible member of the relay team.

== Statistics ==
=== Personal bests ===
Outdoor

- 400 metres: 45.34 ( (Italy) Lignano Sabbiadoro, 8 July 2026)

== See also ==
- Italian all-time lists - 400 metres
- Italy national relay team
