= Riccardo Meli =

Italian sprinter

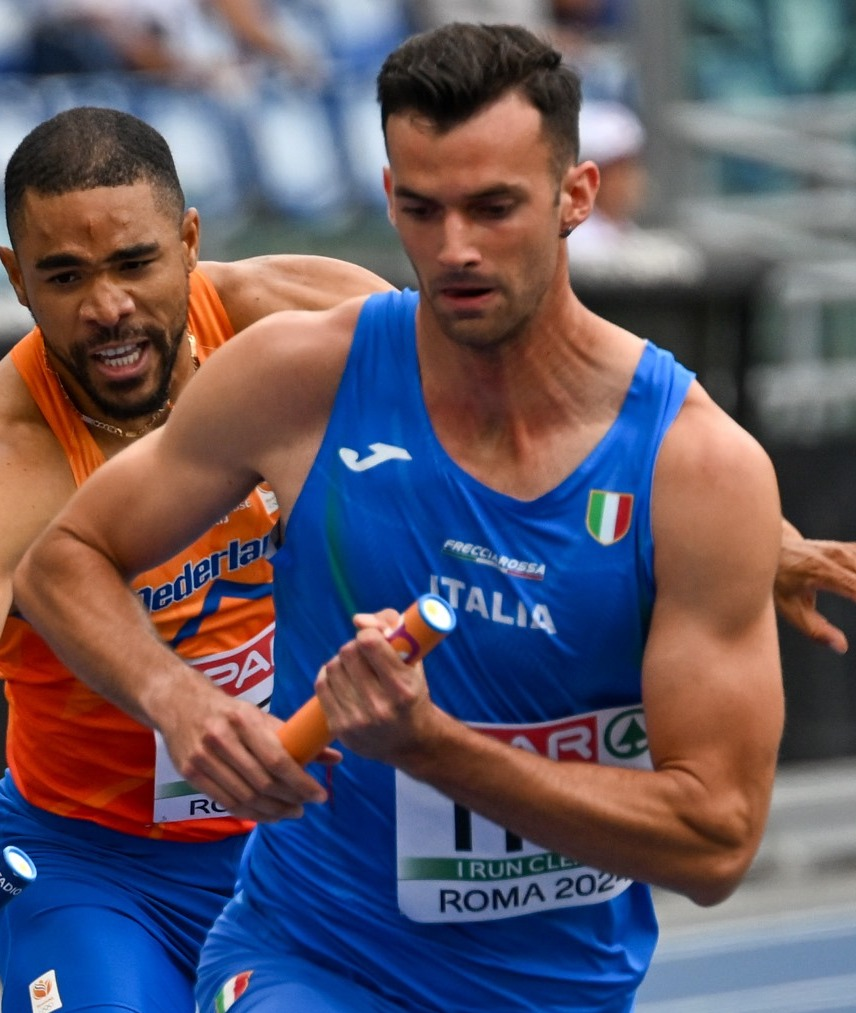

Personal information
- National team: Italy: 3 caps (2021-)
- Born: 15 April 2001 (age 25) Vico Equense, Italy
- Height: 1.99 m (6 ft 6 in)
- Weight: 85 kg (187 lb)

Sport
- Sport: Athletics
- Event: Sprinting
- Club: CUS Palermo, Fiamme Gialle
- Coached by: Claudio Licciardello

Achievements and titles
- Personal best: 400 m indoor: 46.38 (2023)
Medal record
Men's athletics
Representing Italy
European Championships
Silver medal – second place	2024 Rome	4 × 400 m relay
Mediterranean Games
Bronze medal – third place	2026 Taranto	4 × 400 m relay

Riccardo Meli (born 15 April 2001) is an Italian sprinter. He won the 2023 Italian indoor championships.

== Career ==
Meli won a silver medal at the 2021 European Athletics U23 Championships in Tallinn.

He won a national championship at senior level during his career.

== National titles ==
- Italian Athletics Indoor Championships
  - 400 metres: 2023

== See also ==
- Italian national track relay team
