= Netherlands at the 2026 European Athletics Championships =

- Flag of the Netherlands
- WA code: NED
- National federation: Royal Dutch Athletics Federation

in Birmingham, United Kingdom 10–16 August 2026
- Competitors: 60 (32 men and 28 women)
- Medals Ranked 4th: Gold 5 Silver 3 Bronze 6 Total 14

European Athletics Championships appearances (overview)
- 1934; 1938; 1946; 1950; 1954; 1958; 1962; 1966; 1969; 1971; 1974; 1978; 1982; 1986; 1990; 1994; 1998; 2002; 2006; 2010; 2012; 2014; 2016; 2018; 2022; 2024; 2026

The Netherlands competed at the 2026 European Athletics Championships in Birmingham, United Kingdom from 10–16 August 2026.

== Medallists ==
Medal	Name	Event	Date
Gold	Jessica Schilder	Women's shot put	10 August
Gold	Nadine Visser	Women's 100 metres hurdles	11 August
Gold	Jorinde van Klinken	Women's discus throw	14 August
Gold	Stefan Nillessen	Men's 1500 metres	15 August
Gold	Myrte van der Schoot; Lieke Klaver; Eveline Saalberg; Femke Broeders-Bol; Vanessa Mercera (heats); Nina Franke (heats)	Women's 4 × 400 metres relay	16 August
Silver	Jorinde van Klinken	Women's shot put	10 August
Silver	Maureen Koster	Women's 10,000 metres	14 August
Silver	Emma Oosterwegel	Women's heptathlon	15 August
Bronze	Jonas Phijffers; Lieke Klaver; Terrence Agard; Myrte van der Schoot	Mixed 4 × 400 metres relay	10 August
Bronze	Jonas Phijffers	Men's 400 metres	12 August
Bronze	Femke Broeders-Bol	Women's 800 metres	14 August
Bronze	Sofie Dokter	Women's heptathlon	15 August
Bronze	Lieke Klaver	Women's 400 metres	15 August
Bronze	Eugene Omalla; Keenan Blake; Terrence Agard; Jonas Phijffers; Liemarvin Bonevacia (heats); Daan Kneppers (heats)	Men's 4 × 400 metres relay	16 August

== Results ==
The Netherlands entered the following athletes:.

Key

- Q = Qualified for the next round
- q = Qualified for the next round as a fastest loser or, in field events, by position without achieving the qualifying target
- NR = National record
- PB = Personal best
- SB = Season best
- N/A = Round not applicable for the event

=== Men ===
Track and road events

Athlete	Event	Heat		Semifinal		Final	
Athlete	Event	Result	Rank	Result	Rank	Result	Rank
Elvis Afrifa	100 m	Bye		10.25	2 Q	10.22	4
Taymir Burnet	100 m	Bye		10.55	8	Did not advance	
Jonas Phijffers	400 m	Bye		44.63 PB	1 Q	44.41 NR	3rd place, bronze medalist(s)
Eugene Omalla	400 m	45.74	7 q	45.19	5	Did not advance	
Tony van Diepen	800 m	DNS					
Ryan Clarke	800 m	1:45.74	3 Q	1:46.17	8	Did not advance	
Samuel Chapple	1500 m	3:42.72	10	—N/a		Did not advance	
Stefan Nillessen	1500 m	3:36.07	4 Q	—N/a		3:35.70	1st place, gold medalist(s)
Mahadi Abdi Ali	5000 m	—N/a				13:17.17 SB	6
Mike Foppen	5000 m	—N/a				13:23.67	11
Tim Verbaandert	5000 m	—N/a				13:23.23	10
Mahadi Abdi Ali	10,000 m	—N/a				29:05.68	16
Mike Foppen	10,000 m	—N/a				DNF	
Tim Verbaandert	10,000 m	—N/a				DNF	
Matthew Sophia	110 m hurdles	Bye		13.55	6	Did not advance	
Joas van Hellemondt	110 m hurdles	Bye		13.49	4	Did not advance	
Liam van der Schaaf	110 m hurdles	13.70	4 q	13.55	5	Did not advance	
Daniljo Vriendwijk; Jozuah Revierre; Xavi Mo-Ajok; Elvis Afrifa	4 × 100 m relay	38.82	2 Q	—N/a		38.98	4
Eugene Omalla; Keenan Blake; Terrence Agard; Jonas Phijffers; Liemarvin Bonevacia (heats); Daan Kneppers (heats)	4 × 400 m relay	3:00.98	1 Q	—N/a		2:59.49	3rd place, bronze medalist(s)

Field events

Athlete	Event	Qualification		Final	
Athlete	Event	Distance	Position	Distance	Position
Menno Vloon	Pole vault	NM		Did not advance	
Jarno van Daalen	Shot put	18.06	27	Did not advance	
Yannick Rolvink	Shot put	17.78	29	Did not advance	
Ruben Rolvink	Discus throw	62.19	12 q	65.45	7
Shaquille Emanuelson	Discus throw	62.24	11 q	67.97	5
Denzel Comenentia	Hammer throw	72.00	20	Did not advance	
Ryan Jansen	Javelin throw	76.81	21	Did not advance	

Combined events – Decathlon

Athlete	Event	100 m	LJ	SP	HJ	400 m	110H	DT	PV	JT	1500 m	Final	Rank
Jip de Greef	Result	11.12	7.02	13.40	1.96	49.76	14.76	47.42	4.80	47.77	4:35.24 PB	7749	17
Jip de Greef	Points	834	818	692	767	826	876	817	849	556	711	7749	17
Luuk Pelkmans	Result	11.28	7.44	15.16	2.02	49.18	14.97	44.47 PB	NM	DNF			
Luuk Pelkmans	Points	799	920	800	822	853	853	756	0	DNF			
Jeff Tesselaar	Result	10.75	7.67 SB	15.11 PB	1.96 SB	47.06 PB	14.65	45.26	4.70	53.80 SB	4:16.13 SB	8378 PB	4
Jeff Tesselaar	Points	917	977	796	767	955	892	772	819	645	838	8378 PB	4

=== Women ===
Track and road events

Athlete	Event	Heat		Semifinal		Final	
Athlete	Event	Result	Rank	Result	Rank	Result	Rank
Lieke Klaver	400 m	Bye		49.71	1 Q	50.15	3rd place, bronze medalist(s)
Myrte van der Schoot	400 m	51.21	2 q	50.75 PB	4	Did not advance	
Eveline Saalberg	400 m	51.65	6 q	50.84 PB	6	Did not advance	
Femke Broeders-Bol	800 m	1:59.96	1 Q	1:57.46	2 Q	1:55.54 =NR	3rd place, bronze medalist(s)
Maureen Koster	5000 m	—N/a				15:41.51	6
Jennifer Gulikers	5000 m	—N/a				15:54.29	13
Amina Maatoug	5000 m	—N/a				15:44.03	7
Maureen Koster	10,000 m	—N/a				31:45.76	2nd place, silver medalist(s)
Jennifer Gulikers	10,000 m	—N/a				32:48.71	18
Diane van Es	10,000 m	—N/a				DNF	
Nadine Visser	100 m hurdles	Bye		12.69	1 Q	12.67	1st place, gold medalist(s)
Mira Groot	100 m hurdles	13.13	18	Did not advance			
Isabel van den Berg; Britt de Blaauw; Fenna Achterberg; Anna Roelofs	4 × 100 m relay	43.95	8	—N/a		Did not advance	
Myrte van der Schoot; Lieke Klaver; Eveline Saalberg; Femke Broeders-Bol; Vanessa Mercera (heats); Nina Franke (heats)	4 × 400 m relay	3:25.00	1 Q	—N/a		3:21.10 SB	1st place, gold medalist(s)

Field events

Athlete	Event	Qualification		Final	
Athlete	Event	Distance	Position	Distance	Position
Marijn Kieft	Pole vault	4.10	25	Did not advance	
Pauline Hondema	Long jump	6.75	7 q	6.47	11
Jessica Schilder	Shot put	19.00	2 Q	20.73	1st place, gold medalist(s)
Jorinde van Klinken	Shot put	18.65	5 Q	19.64 PB	2nd place, silver medalist(s)
Alida van Daalen	Shot put	17.68	10 q	17.54	11
Alida van Daalen	Discus throw	62.58	4 Q	64.22	4
Jorinde van Klinken	Discus throw	62.74	3 Q	67.67	1st place, gold medalist(s)

Combined events – Heptathlon

Athlete	Event	100H	HJ	SP	200 m	LJ	JT	800 m	Final	Rank
Sofie Dokter	Result	13.01	1.74	14.75 PB	23.05	6.51	46.20 SB	2:12.90	6664 PB	3rd place, bronze medalist(s)
Sofie Dokter	Points	1123	903	844	1074	1010	787	923	6664 PB	3rd place, bronze medalist(s)
Emma Oosterwegel	Result	12.98	1.74	14.26	23.55	6.50 PB	51.49	2:10.87	6713 PB	2nd place, silver medalist(s)
Emma Oosterwegel	Points	1127	903	811	1024	1007	889	952	6713 PB	2nd place, silver medalist(s)

=== Mixed ===
Track and road events

Athlete	Event	Final	
Athlete	Event	Result	Rank
Jaimie Omalla; Britt de Blaauw; Xavi Mo-Ajok; Fenna Achterberg	4 × 100 m relay	DNF	
Jonas Phijffers; Lieke Klaver; Terrence Agard; Myrte van der Schoot	4 × 400 m relay	3:10.77 SB	3rd place, bronze medalist(s)
