= Netherlands at the European Athletics Championships =

- WA code: NED
- National federation: NOC*NSF
- Website: www.nocnsf.nl
- Medals Ranked 10th: Gold 38 Silver 31 Bronze 35 Total 104

European Athletics Championships appearances (overview)
- 1934; 1938; 1946; 1950; 1954; 1958; 1962; 1966; 1969; 1971; 1974; 1978; 1982; 1986; 1990; 1994; 1998; 2002; 2006; 2010; 2012; 2014; 2016; 2018; 2022; 2024; 2026

Netherlands at the European Athletics Championships is an overview of the Dutch results at the European Athletics Championships.

== List of medalists ==
Medal	Championship	Name	Event
Gold	(Italy) 1934 Turin	Chris Berger	Men's 100 metres
Gold	(Italy) 1934 Turin	Chris Berger	Men's 200 metres
Gold	(Italy) 1934 Turin	Willem Peeters	Men's triple jump
Bronze	(Italy) 1934 Turin	Tinus Osendarp	Men's 200 metres
Bronze	(Italy) 1934 Turin	Tinus Osendarp; Tjeerd Boersma; Robert Jansen; Chris Berger	Men's 4 × 100 metres relay
Gold	(France) 1938 Paris	Tinus Osendarp	Men's 100 metres
Gold	(France) 1938 Paris	Tinus Osendarp	Men's 200 metres
Silver	(France) 1938 Paris	Karl Baumgarten	Men's 400 metres
Silver	(Germany) 1938 Vienna	Nelly van Balen-Blanken	Women's high jump
Bronze	(France) 1938 Paris	Reinden Brasser	Men's 110 metres hurdles
Bronze	(Germany) 1938 Vienna	Fanny Blankers-Koen	Women's 100 metres
Bronze	(Germany) 1938 Vienna	Fanny Blankers-Koen	Women's 200 metres
Bronze	(Germany) 1938 Vienna	Catherina Ter Braake	Women's 80 metres hurdles
Gold	(Norway) 1946 Oslo	Fanny Blankers-Koen	Women's 80 metres hurdles
Gold	(Norway) 1946 Oslo	Gerda van der Kade-Koudijs; Netty Witziers-Timmer; Marta Adema; Fanny Blankers-Koen	Women's 4 × 100 metres relay
Gold	(Norway) 1946 Oslo	Gerda van der Kade-Koudijs	Women's long jump
Silver	(Norway) 1946 Oslo	Wim Slijkhuis	Men's 5000 metres
Silver	(Norway) 1946 Oslo	Ann Niesink	Women's discus throw
Bronze	(Norway) 1946 Oslo	Johanna Koning	Women's javelin throw
Gold	(Belgium) 1950 Brussels	Fanny Blankers-Koen	Women's 100 metres
Gold	(Belgium) 1950 Brussels	Fanny Blankers-Koen	Women's 200 metres
Gold	(Belgium) 1950 Brussels	Fanny Blankers-Koen	Women's 80 metres hurdles
Gold	(Belgium) 1950 Brussels	Wim Slijkhuis	Men's 1500 metres
Silver	(Belgium) 1950 Brussels	Gerard Wessels	Men's long jump
Silver	(Belgium) 1950 Brussels	Wilhelmina Lust	Women's long jump
Silver	(Belgium) 1950 Brussels	Xenia Stad-de Jong; Bertha Brouwer; Gré de Jongh; Fanny Blankers-Koen	Women's 4 × 100 metres relay
Bronze	(Belgium) 1950 Brussels	Jan Lammers	Men's 200 metres
Silver	(Switzerland) 1954 Bern	Bertha van Duyne	Women's 100 metres
Gold	(Socialist Federal Republic of Yugoslavia) 1962 Belgrade	Gerda Kraan	Women's 800 metres
Silver	(Socialist Federal Republic of Yugoslavia) 1962 Belgrade	Kees Koch	Men's discus throw
Bronze	(Socialist Federal Republic of Yugoslavia) 1962 Belgrade	Tilly van der Zwaard	Women's 400 metres
Silver	(Greece) 1969 Athens	Wilma van den Berg	Women's 100 metres
Silver	(Greece) 1969 Athens	Maria Gommers	Women's 1500 metres
Gold	(Greece) 1982 Athens	Gerard Nijboer	Men's marathon
Bronze	(West Germany) 1986 Stuttgart	Han Kulker	Men's 1500 metres
Bronze	(West Germany) 1986 Stuttgart	Nelli Cooman	Women's 100 metres
Silver	(Socialist Federal Republic of Yugoslavia) 1990 Split	Erik de Bruin	Men's discus throw
Bronze	(Hungary) 1998 Budapest	Robin Korving	Men's 110 metres hurdles
Silver	(Germany) 2002 Munich	Simon Vroemen	Men's 3000 metres steeplechase
Gold	(Sweden) 2006 Gothenburg	Bram Som	Men's 800 metres
Silver	(Sweden) 2006 Gothenburg	Karin Ruckstuhl	Women's heptathlon
Bronze	(Sweden) 2006 Gothenburg	Rutger Smith	Men's shot put
Gold	(Spain) 2010 Barcelona	Yvonne Hak	Women's 800 metres
Silver	(Spain) 2010 Barcelona	Eelco Sintnicolaas	Men's decathlon
Bronze	(Spain) 2010 Barcelona	Hilda Kibet	Women's 10,000 metres
Gold	(Finland) 2012 Helsinki	Churandy Martina	Men's 200 metres
Gold	(Finland) 2012 Helsinki	Churandy Martina; Brian Mariano; Giovanni Codrington; Patrick van Luijk; Jerrel Feller*	Men's 4 × 100 metres relay
Silver	(Finland) 2012 Helsinki	Kadene Vassell; Dafne Schippers; Eva Lubbers; Jamile Samuel; Esther Akihary*; Marit Dopheide*	Women's 4 × 100 metres relay
Silver	(Finland) 2012 Helsinki	Patrick van Luijk	Men's 200 metres
Silver	(Finland) 2012 Helsinki	Rutger Smith	Men's shot put
Bronze	(Finland) 2012 Helsinki	Rutger Smith	Men's discus throw
Gold	(Switzerland) 2014 Zurich	Dafne Schippers	Women's 100 metres
Gold	(Switzerland) 2014 Zurich	Dafne Schippers	Women's 200 metres
Gold	(Switzerland) 2014 Zurich	Sifan Hassan	Women's 1500 metres
Silver	(Switzerland) 2014 Zurich	Nadine Broersen	Women's heptathlon
Silver	(Switzerland) 2014 Zurich	Sifan Hassan	Women's 5000 metres
Bronze	(Switzerland) 2014 Zurich	Susan Kuijken	Women's 5000 metres
Gold	(Netherlands) 2016 Amsterdam	Churandy Martina	Men's 100 metres
Gold	(Netherlands) 2016 Amsterdam	Dafne Schippers	Women's 100 metres
Gold	(Netherlands) 2016 Amsterdam	Anouk Vetter	Women's heptathlon
Gold	(Netherlands) 2016 Amsterdam	Jamile Samuel; Dafne Schippers; Tessa van Schagen; Naomi Sedney; Marije van Hunenstijn*	Women's 4 × 100 metres relay
Silver	(Netherlands) 2016 Amsterdam	Sifan Hassan	Women's 1500 metres
Bronze	(Netherlands) 2016 Amsterdam	Liemarvin Bonevacia	Men's 400 metres
Bronze	(Netherlands) 2016 Amsterdam	Ignisious Gaisah	Men's long jump
Gold	(Germany) 2018 Berlin	Sifan Hassan	Women's 5000 metres
Silver	(Germany) 2018 Berlin	Dafne Schippers	Women's 200 metres
Silver	(Germany) 2018 Berlin	Susan Krumins	Women's 10,000 metres
Silver	(Germany) 2018 Berlin	Dafne Schippers; Marije van Hunenstein; Jamile Samuel; Naomi Sedney	Women's 4 × 100 metres relay
Bronze	(Germany) 2018 Berlin	Dafne Schippers	Women's 100 metres
Bronze	(Germany) 2018 Berlin	Jamile Samuel	Women's 200 metres
Bronze	(Germany) 2018 Berlin	Lisanne de Witte	Women's 400 metres
Bronze	(Germany) 2018 Berlin	Chris Garia; Churandy Martina; Hensley Paulina; Taymir Burnet	Men's 4 × 100 metres relay
Gold	(Germany) 2022 Munich	Jessica Schilder	Women's shot put
Gold	(Germany) 2022 Munich	Femke Bol	Women's 400 metres
Gold	(Germany) 2022 Munich	Femke Bol	Women's 400 metres hurdles
Gold	(Germany) 2022 Munich	Eveline Saalberg; Lieke Klaver; Lisanne de Witte; Femke Bol; Andrea Bouma*; Laura de Witte*	Women's 4 × 400 metres relay
Bronze	(Germany) 2022 Munich	Nienke Brinkman	Women's marathon
Bronze	(Germany) 2022 Munich	Jorinde van Klinken	Women's shot put
Gold	(Italy) 2024 Rome	Jessica Schilder	Women's shot put
Gold	(Italy) 2024 Rome	Femke Bol	Women's 400 metres hurdles
Gold	(Italy) 2024 Rome	Cathelijn Peeters; Lieke Klaver; Lisanne de Witte; Femke Bol; Eveline Saalberg*; Anne van de Wiel*; Myrte van der Schoot*	Women's 4 × 400 metres relay
Silver	(Italy) 2024 Rome	Jorinde van Klinken	Women's shot put
Silver	(Italy) 2024 Rome	Jorinde van Klinken	Women's discus throw
Silver	(Italy) 2024 Rome	Diane van Es	Women's 10,000 metres
Silver	(Italy) 2024 Rome	Elvis Afrifa; Taymir Burnet; Xavi Mo-Ajok; Nsikak Ekpo	Men's 4 × 100 metres relay
Bronze	(Italy) 2024 Rome	Liemarvin Bonevacia	Men's 400 metres
Bronze	(Italy) 2024 Rome	Lieke Klaver	Women's 400 metres
Bronze	(Italy) 2024 Rome	Cathelijn Peeters	Women's 400 metres hurdles
Bronze	(Italy) 2024 Rome	Liemarvin Bonevacia; Lieke Klaver; Isaya Klein Ikkink; Femke Bol	Mixed 4 × 400 metres relay
Bronze	(Italy) 2024 Rome	Nadine Visser; Marije van Hunenstijn; Minke Bisschops; Tasa Jiya	Women's 4 × 100 metres relay
Gold	(United Kingdom) 2026 Birmingham	Jessica Schilder	Women's shot put
Gold	(United Kingdom) 2026 Birmingham	Nadine Visser	Women's 100 metres hurdles
Gold	(United Kingdom) 2026 Birmingham	Jorinde van Klinken	Women's discus throw
Gold	(United Kingdom) 2026 Birmingham	Stefan Nillessen	Men's 1500 metres
Gold	(United Kingdom) 2026 Birmingham	Myrte van der Schoot; Lieke Klaver; Eveline Saalberg; Femke Broeders-Bol; Vanessa Mercera*; Nina Franke*	Women's 4 × 400 metres relay
Silver	(United Kingdom) 2026 Birmingham	Jorinde van Klinken	Women's shot put
Silver	(United Kingdom) 2026 Birmingham	Maureen Koster	Women's 10,000 metres
Silver	(United Kingdom) 2026 Birmingham	Emma Oosterwegel	Women's heptathlon
Bronze	(United Kingdom) 2026 Birmingham	Jonas Phijffers; Lieke Klaver; Terrence Agard; Myrte van der Schoot	Mixed 4 × 400 metres relay
Bronze	(United Kingdom) 2026 Birmingham	Jonas Phijffers	Men's 400 metres
Bronze	(United Kingdom) 2026 Birmingham	Femke Broeders-Bol	Women's 800 metres
Bronze	(United Kingdom) 2026 Birmingham	Sofie Dokter	Women's heptathlon
Bronze	(United Kingdom) 2026 Birmingham	Lieke Klaver	Women's 400 metres
Bronze	(United Kingdom) 2026 Birmingham	Eugene Omalla; Keenan Blake; Terrence Agard; Jonas Phijffers; Liemarvin Bonevacia*; Daan Kneppers*	Men's 4 × 400 metres relay

== Medal table ==
Championship	Gold	Silver	Bronze	Total	Rank
(Italy) 1934 Turin	3	0	2	5	3
(France) / (Germany) 1938 Paris/Vienna	2	2	4	8	6
(Norway) 1946 Oslo	3	2	1	6	5
(Belgium) 1950 Brussels	4	3	1	8	4
(Switzerland) 1954 Bern	0	1	0	1	12
(Sweden) 1958 Stockholm	0	0	0	0	-
(Socialist Federal Republic of Yugoslavia) 1962 Belgrade	1	1	1	3	11
(Hungary) 1966 Budapest	0	0	0	0	-
(Greece) 1969 Athens	0	2	0	2	12
(Finland) 1971 Helsinki	0	0	0	0	-
(Italy) 1974 Rome	0	0	0	0	-
(Czechoslovakia) 1978 Prague	0	0	0	0	-
(Greece) 1982 Athens	1	0	0	1	14
(West Germany) 1986 Stuttgart	0	0	2	2	16
(Socialist Federal Republic of Yugoslavia) 1990 Split	0	1	0	1	17
(Finland) 1994 Helsinki	0	0	0	0	-
(Hungary) 1998 Budapest	0	0	1	1	23
(Germany) 2002 Munich	0	1	0	1	23
(Sweden) 2006 Gothenburg	1	1	1	3	14
(Spain) 2010 Barcelona	1	1	1	3	11
(Finland) 2012 Helsinki	2	3	1	6	8
(Switzerland) 2014 Zurich	3	2	1	6	5
(Netherlands) 2016 Amsterdam	4	1	2	7	5
(Germany) 2018 Berlin	1	3	4	8	12
(Germany) 2022 Munich	4	0	2	6	5
(Italy) 2024 Rome	3	4	5	12	6
(United Kingdom) 2026 Birmingham	5	3	6	14	4
Total	38	31	35	104	10

== Most successful Dutch athletes ==
Rank	Athlete	Events	From	To	Gold	Silver	Bronze	Total
1	Femke Broeders-Bol	400 m / 800 m / 400 m hurdles / 4 × 400 m relay / 4 × 400 m mixed relay	2022	2026	6	–	2	8
2	Fanny Blankers-Koen	100 m / 200 m / 80 m hurdles / 4 × 100 m relay	1938	1950	5	1	2	8
3	Dafne Schippers	100 m / 200 m / 4 × 100 m relay	2012	2018	4	3	1	8
4	Lieke Klaver	400 m / 4 × 400 m relay / 4 × 400 m mixed relay	2022	2026	3	–	4	7
5	Churandy Martina	100 m / 200 m / 4 × 100 m relay	2012	2018	3	–	1	4
6	Jessica Schilder	Shot put	2022	2026	3	–	–	3
6	Eveline Saalberg*	4 × 400 m relay	2022	2026	3	–	–	3
8	Sifan Hassan	1500 m / 5000 m	2014	2018	2	2	–	4
9	Tinus Osendarp	100 m / 200 m / 4 × 100 m relay	1934	1938	2	–	2	4
10	Chris Berger	100 m / 200 m / 4 × 100 m relay	1934		2	–	1	3
10	Lisanne de Witte	400 m / 4 × 400 m relay	2018	2024	2	–	1	3
10	Myrte van der Schoot*	4 × 400 m relay / 4 × 400 m mixed relay	2024	2026	2	–	1	3

* includes medals in relay events in which they participated in the heats only

== Most successful events ==
Rank	Event	Gold	Silver	Bronze	Total
1	Women's 100 metres	3	2	3	8
2	Women's shot put	3	2	1	6
3	Men's 200 metres	3	1	2	5
4	Men's 100 metres	3	–	–	3
4	Women's 4 × 400 metres relay	3	–	–	3
6	Women's 4 × 100 metres relay	2	3	1	6
7	Women's 200 metres	2	1	2	5
8	Women's 800 metres	2	–	1	3
8	Women's 80 metres hurdles	2	–	1	3
8	Women's 400 metres hurdles	2	–	1	3

== See also ==
- Netherlands at the World Athletics Championships
- Netherlands at the European Road Championships
- Netherlands at the European Track Championships
