= Netherlands at the 2014 European Athletics Championships =

- WA code: NED
- National federation: NOC*NSF
- Website: www.nocnsf.nl

in Zürich
- Competitors: 43 in 23 events
- Medals Ranked 5th: Gold 3 Silver 2 Bronze 1 Total 6

European Athletics Championships appearances (overview)
- 1934; 1938; 1946; 1950; 1954; 1958; 1962; 1966; 1969; 1971; 1974; 1978; 1982; 1986; 1990; 1994; 1998; 2002; 2006; 2010; 2012; 2014; 2016; 2018; 2022; 2024

Netherlands competed at the 2014 European Athletics Championships in Zürich, Switzerland, from 12–17 August 2014. A delegation of 43 athletes were sent to represent the country.

== Medals ==
Medal	Name	Event	Date
Gold	Dafne Schippers	Women's 100m	13 August
Gold	Dafne Schippers	Women's 200m	15 August
Gold	Sifan Hassan	Women's 1500m	15 August
Silver	Nadine Broersen	Women's heptathlon	15 August
Silver	Sifan Hassan	Women's 5000m	16 August
Bronze	Susan Kuijken	Women's 5000m	16 August

== Results ==
Men
Track and road

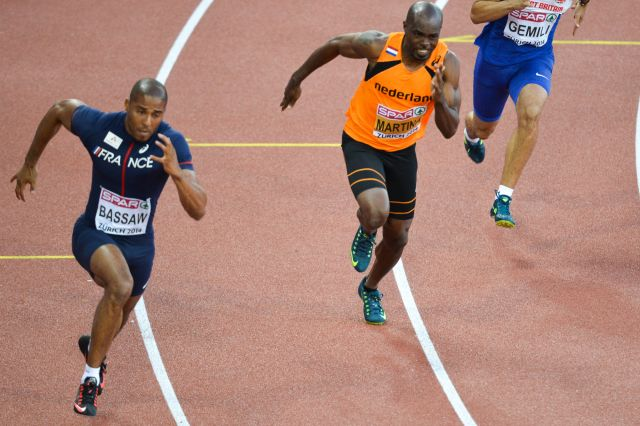
Churandy Martina running the 200 metres final

Event	Athletes	Heats		Semifinal		Final	
Event	Athletes	Result	Rank	Result	Rank	Result	Rank
100 metres	Churandy Martina	10.31	9 Q	10.34	9	did not advance	
100 metres	Jorén Tromp	11.28	35	did not advance			
100 metres	Giovanni Codrington	10.43	23 Q	10.39	16	did not advance	
200 metres	Churandy Martina	20.60	7 Q	20.40	6 Q	20.37	4
400 metres	Liemarvin Bonevacia	45.65	4 Q	46.38	18	did not advance	
800 metres	Thijmen Kupers	1:49.69	27	did not advance			
10,000 metres	Tom Wiggers	—				DNF	
Marathon	Hugo van den Broek	—				DNS	
Marathon	Olfert Molenhuis	—				2:22:45	36
Marathon	Koen Raymaekers	—				2:20:49	31
Marathon	Ronald Schröer	—				2:24:51	42
110 m hurdles	Gregory Sedoc	13.58	18	did not advance			
4 × 100 metres relay	Churandy Martina; Jorén Tromp; Giovanni Codrington; Wouter Brus; Patrick van Luijk; Hensley Paulina	42.77	3 Q	—		39.60	5
4 × 400 metres relay	Liemarvin Bonevacia; Terence Agard; Bjorn Blauwhof; Obed Martis; Bram Peters	3:05.93	11	—		did not advance	

Field events

Event	Athletes	Qualification		Final	
Event	Athletes	Distance	Position	Distance	Position
Long jump	Ignisious Gaisah	7.78	12 q	8.08	6
Discus throw	Erik Cadée	61.18	13	did not advance	

Combined events – Decathlon

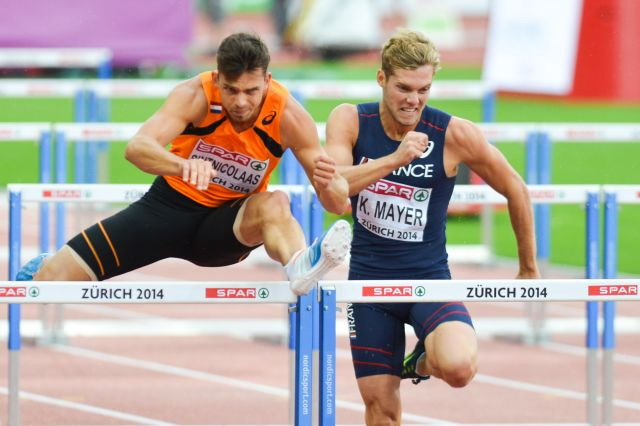
Eelco Sintnicolaas running the 110 metres hurdles

Athlete	Event	100 m	LJ	SP	HJ	400 m	110H	DT	PV	JT	1500 m	Final	Rank
Eelco Sintnicolaas	Result	10.90	7.33	14.28	2.01	48.44	14.12	42.56	5.40	59.37	4:30.95	8478	4
Eelco Sintnicolaas	Points	883	893	745	813	888	959	717	1035	728	738	8478	4
Pelle Rietveld	Result	11.07	7.00	13.75	1.77	50.33	14.54	40.07	DNF				
Pelle Rietveld	Points	845	814	713	602	799	906	666	DNF				

Women
Track and road

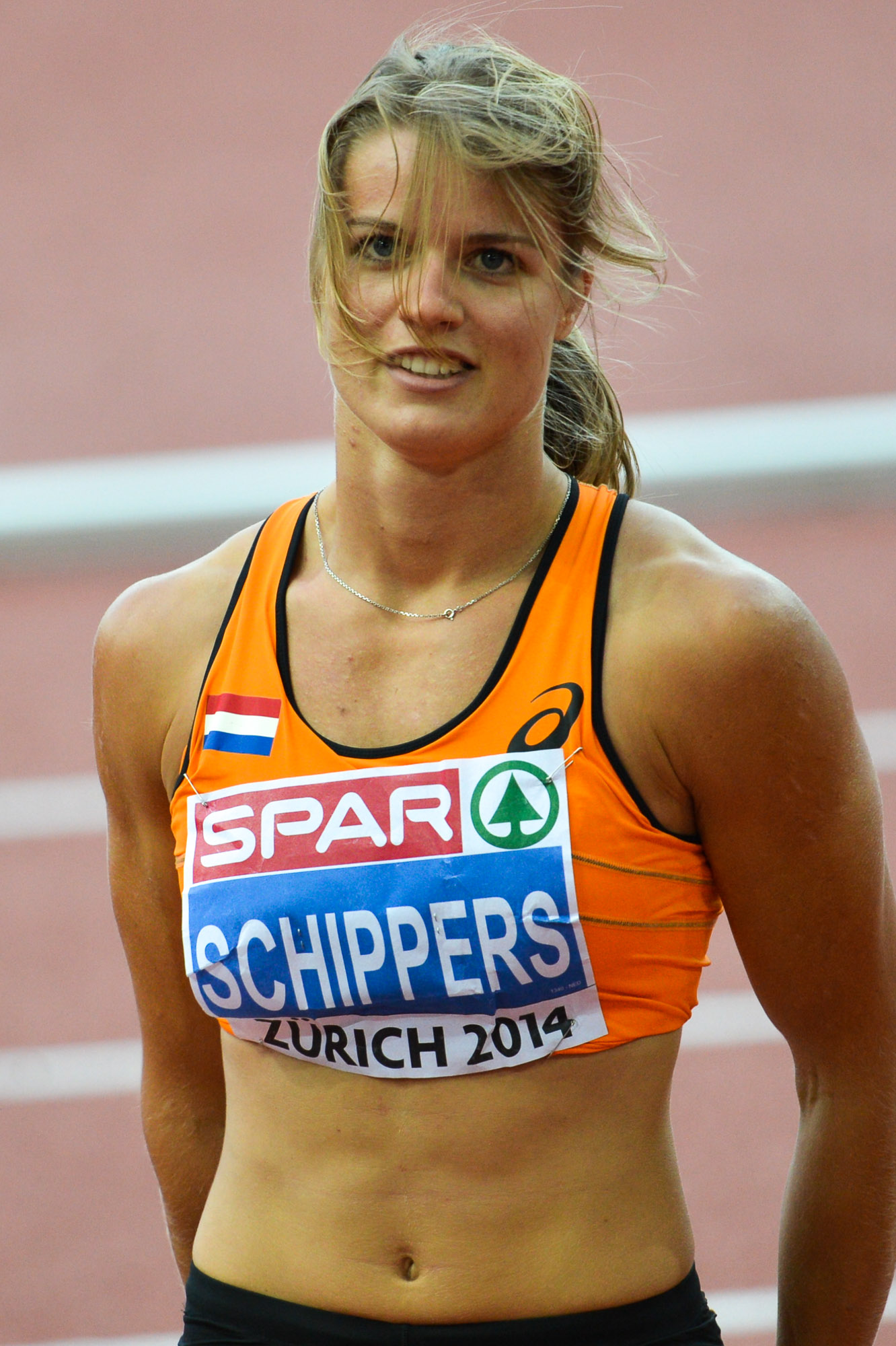
Dafne Schippers won the women's 100 metres and the women's 200 metres

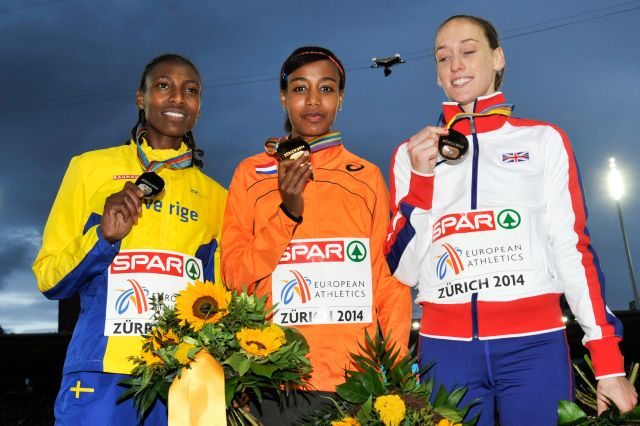
Sifan Hassan won the women's 1500 metres

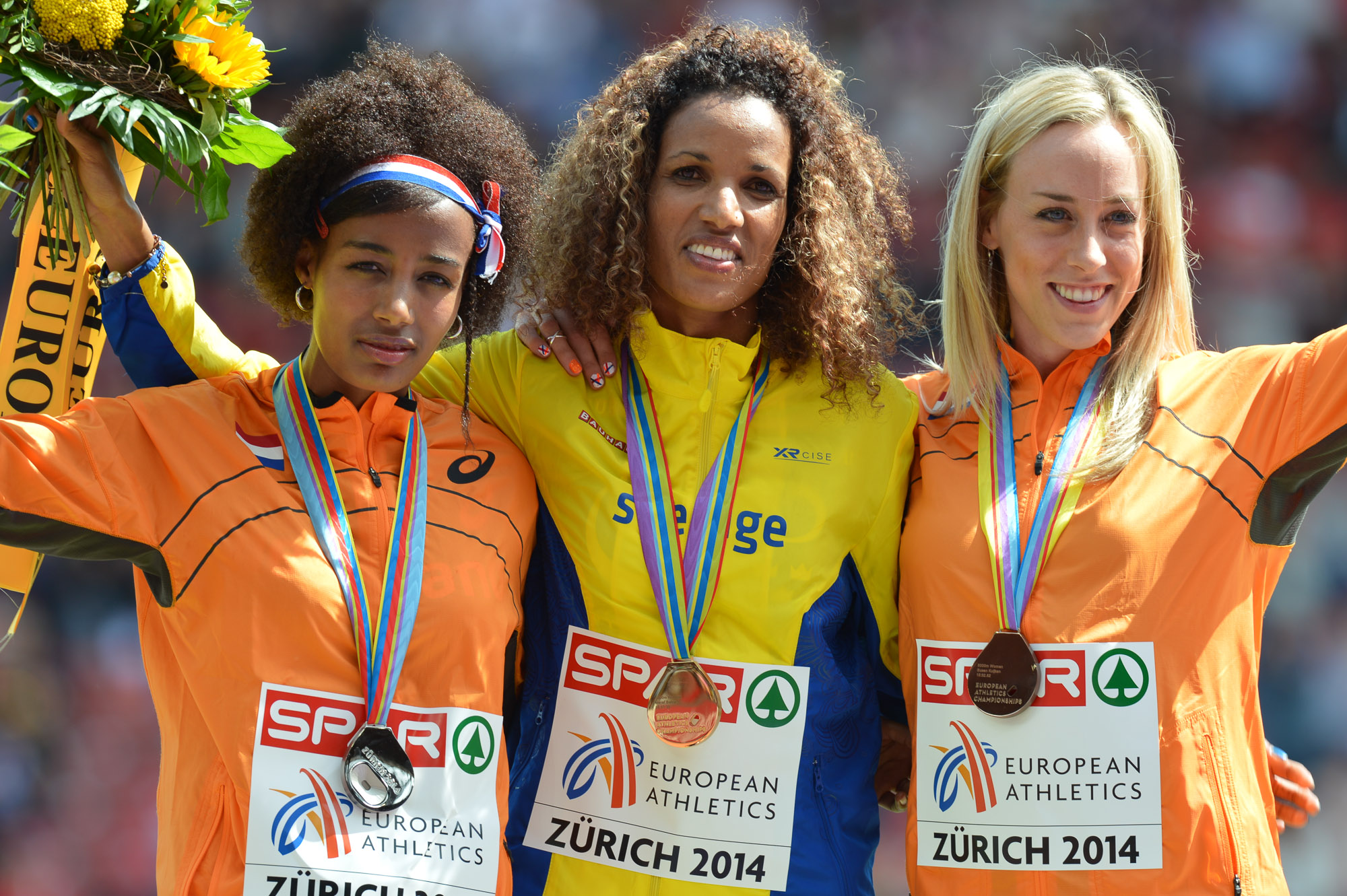
Sifan Hassan and Susan Kuijken won silver and bronze at the women's 5000 metres

Event	Athletes	Heats		Semifinal		Final	
Event	Athletes	Result	Rank	Result	Rank	Result	Rank
100 metres	Dafne Schippers	11.10	2 Q	11.08	1 Q	11.12	1st place, gold medalist(s)
100 metres	Jamile Samuel	11.46	20 Q	11.54	21	did not advance	
200 metres	Dafne Schippers	22.73	1 Q	22.48	1 Q	22.03 NR	1st place, gold medalist(s)
200 metres	Jamile Samuel	23.10	6 Q	23.18	11 Q	23.31	6
800 metres	Sanne Verstegen	2:02.73	14	did not advance			
1500 metres	Sifan Hassan	4:09.55	1 Q	—		4:04.18	1st place, gold medalist(s)
1500 metres	Maureen Koster	4:15.11	17	—		did not advance	
5000 metres	Susan Kuijken	—				15:32.82	3rd place, bronze medalist(s)
5000 metres	Sifan Hassan	—				15.31.79	2nd place, silver medalist(s)
10000 metres	Jip Vastenburg	—				32:27.37	4
100 metres hurdles	Sharona Bakker	12.85	4 Q	13.02	10	did not advance	
100 metres hurdles	Rosina Hodde	12.99	10 q	12.91	5 Q	13.08	7
100 metres hurdles	Nadine Visser	13.12	14	did not advance			
Marathon	Miranda Boonstra	—				2:32:39	13
Marathon	Andrea Deelstra	—				2:34:29	19
Marathon	Ruth van der Meijden	—				DNF	
Marathon	Stefanie Bouma	—				2:42:47	37
4 x 100 metres relay	Dafne Schippers; Jamile Samuel; Mediea Ghafoor; Loreanne Kuhurima; Tessa van Schagen; Naomi Sedney	38.90	8 Q	—		DNF	

Field events

Event	Athletes	Qualification		Final	
Event	Athletes	Distance	Position	Distance	Position
Shot put	Melissa Boekelman	16.66	12 q	17.23	10

Combined events – Heptathlon

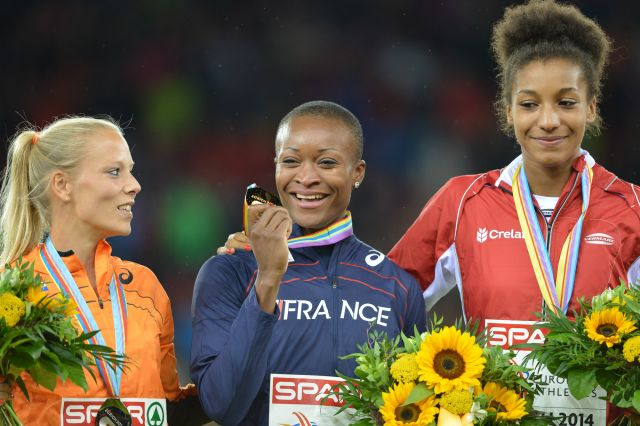
Nadine Broersen won silver in the women's Heptathlon

Athlete	Event	100H	HJ	SP	200 m	LJ	JT	800 m	Final	Rank
Anouk Vetter	Result	13.68	1.79	14.16	24.61	6.04	52.49	2:22.27	6281	7
Anouk Vetter	Points	1024	966	805	923	862	908	793	6281	7
Nadine Broersen	Result	13.48	1.94 NR	13.35	25.08	6.16	52.18	2:17.66	6498	2nd place, silver medalist(s)
Nadine Broersen	Points	1053	1158	751	879	899	902	856	6498	2nd place, silver medalist(s)

Key

- Note–Ranks given for track events are within the athlete's heat only
- Q = Qualified for the next round
- q = Qualified for the next round as a fastest loser or, in field events, by position without achieving the qualifying target
- NR = National record
- N/A = Round not applicable for the event
- Bye = Athlete not required to compete in round

== See also ==
Netherlands at other European Championships in 2014

- Netherlands at the 2014 European Road Championships
