= Netherlands at the 2018 European Athletics Championships =

- WA code: NED
- National federation: KNAU
- Website: www.atletiek.nl

in Berlin
- Competitors: 45 (22 men and 23 women)
- Medals: Gold 1 Silver 3 Bronze 4 Total 8

European Athletics Championships appearances (overview)
- 1934; 1938; 1946; 1950; 1954; 1958; 1962; 1966; 1969; 1971; 1974; 1978; 1982; 1986; 1990; 1994; 1998; 2002; 2006; 2010; 2012; 2014; 2016; 2018; 2022; 2024

This article discusses the participation of the Netherlands at the 2018 European Athletics Championships. Netherlands was represented by 45 athletes at the 2018 European Athletics Championships in Berlin, Germany, 6–12 August 2018.

== Medals ==
Medal	Name	Event	Date
Gold	Sifan Hassan	Women's 5000 metres	12 August
Silver	Susan Krumins	Women's 10,000 metres	8 August
Silver	Dafne Schippers	Women's 200 metres	11 August
Silver	Jamile Samuel; Dafne Schippers; Naomi Sedney; Marije van Hunenstijn	Women's 4 × 100 metres relay	12 August
Bronze	Dafne Schippers	Women's 100 metres	7 August
Bronze	Jamile Samuel	Women's 200 metres	11 August
Bronze	Lisanne de Witte	Women's 400 metres	11 August
Bronze	Taymir Burnet; Chris Garia; Churandy Martina; Hensley Paulina	Men's 4 × 100 metres relay	12 August

== Results ==
The following athletes were selected to compete by the Royal Dutch Athletics Federation.

Men
Track and road

Athletes	Event	Heats		Semifinal		Final	
Athletes	Event	Result	Rank	Result	Rank	Result	Rank
Churandy Martina	100 metres	10.24	1 Q	10.18	7 q	10.16	6
Chris Garia	100 metres	10.35	8 Q	10.31	15	did not advance	
Hensley Paulina	100 metres	10.34	7 q	10.38	19	did not advance	
Joris van Gool	100 metres	10.52	26	did not advance			
Solomon Bockarie	200 metres	20.66	7 Q	20.41	7 q		
Churandy Martina	200 metres	Bye		20.51	10	did not advance	
Taymir Burnet	200 metres	20.67	8 Q	20.84	21	did not advance	
Liemarvin Bonevacia	400 metres	Bye		45.39	11	did not advance	
Benjamin de Haan	5000 metres	—N/a				13:42.95	20
Benjamin de Haan	10,000 metres	—N/a				29:38.31	22
Abdi Nageeye	Marathon	—N/a				did not finish	
Koen Smet	110 metres hurdles	13.61	4 Q	13.71	21	did not advance	
Nick Smidt	400 metres hurdles	50.96	15	did not advance			
Noah Schutte	3000 metres steeplechase	8:45.81	23	—N/a		did not advance	
Churandy Martina; Chris Garia; Hensley Paulina; Taymir Burnet	4 × 100 metres relay	38.30	2 Q	—N/a		38.03 NR	3rd place, bronze medalist(s)
Liemarvin Bonevacia; Nick Smidt; Tony van Diepen; Ramsey Angela	4 × 400 metres relay	3:04.93	9	—N/a		did not advance	

Field events

Athletes	Event	Qualification		Final	
Athletes	Event	Distance	Position	Distance	Position
Douwe Amels	High jump	2.21	10 q	2.19	8
Rutger Koppelaar	Pole vault	5.16	31	did not advance	
Erik Cadée	Discus throw	57.97	22	did not advance	
Denzel Comenentia	Hammer throw	70.70	22	did not advance	

Combined events – Decathlon

Athlete	Event	100 m	LJ	SP	HJ	400 m	110H	DT	PV	JT	1500 m	Final	Rank
Pieter Braun	Result	11.33	7.52	14.22	2.02 SB	48.52 SB	14.56	43.75	4.60	59.53	4:27.20	8105	7
Pieter Braun	Points	789	940	742	822	884	903	741	790	731	763	8105	7
Eelco Sintnicolaas	Result	11.04	7.13	14.06	1.81	did not finish							
Eelco Sintnicolaas	Points	852	845	732	636	did not finish							

Women
Track and road

Athletes	Event	Heats		Semifinal		Final	
Athletes	Event	Result	Rank	Result	Rank	Result	Rank
Dafne Schippers	100 metres	Bye		11.05	3 Q	10.99 SB	3rd place, bronze medalist(s)
Jamile Samuel	100 metres	Bye		11.10 PB	2 Q	11.14	5
Naomi Sedney	100 metres	11.45	6 Q	11.42	18	did not advance	
Marije van Hunenstijn	100 metres	11.48	10 Q	11.49	21	did not advance	
Dafne Schippers	200 metres	Bye		22.69	4 Q	22.14 SB	2nd place, silver medalist(s)
Jamile Samuel	200 metres	Bye		22.58	2 Q	22.37 =PB	3rd place, bronze medalist(s)
Madiea Ghafoor	400 metres	Bye		51.29	5 Q	51.57	8
Lisanne de Witte	400 metres	Bye		51.24	4 q	50.77 NR	3rd place, bronze medalist(s)
Laura de Witte	400 metres	52.72	16	did not advance			
Sanne Verstegen	800 metres	2:02.72	18	did not advance			
Sifan Hassan	5000 metres	—N/a				14:46.12 CR	1st place, gold medalist(s)
Maureen Koster	5000 metres	—N/a				15:21.64	8
Susan Krumins	5000 metres	—N/a				15:09.65 SB	6
Susan Krumins	10,000 metres	—N/a				31:52.55	2nd place, silver medalist(s)
Jip Vastenburg	10,000 metres	—N/a				33:41.79	15
Ruth van der Meijden	Marathon	—N/a				2:35:44	18
Andrea Deelstra	Marathon	—N/a				did not finish	
Nadine Visser	100 metres hurdles	Bye		12.84	5 Q	12.88	4
Eefje Boons	100 metres hurdles	Bye		12.94	10	did not advance	
Irene van der Reijken	3000 metres steeplechase	9:57.10	31	—N/a		did not advance	
Dafne Schippers; Jamile Samuel; Naomi Sedney; Marije van Hunenstijn	4 × 100 metres relay	42.62 SB	4 Q	—N/a		42.15 SB	2nd place, silver medalist(s)

Field events

Athletes	Event	Qualification		Final	
Athletes	Event	Distance	Position	Distance	Position
Femke Pluim	Pole vault	4.20	12	did not advance	
Melissa Boekelman	Shot put	16.90	14	did not advance	
Corinne Nugter	Discus throw	55.70	14	did not advance	
Jorinde van Klinken	Discus throw	54.33	20	did not advance	

Combined events – Heptathlon

Athlete	Event	100H	HJ	SP	200 m	LJ	JT	800 m	Final	Rank
Anouk Vetter	Result	13.55	1.76	14.79	23.97	6.30	51.25	2:22.84	6414	5
Anouk Vetter	Points	1043	928	847	984	943	884	785	6414	5
