= Netherlands at the 2016 European Athletics Championships =

- WA code: NED
- National federation: KNAU
- Website: www.atletiekunie.nl

in Amsterdam
- Competitors: 53 (26 men and 27 women) in 31 events
- Medals Ranked 5th: Gold 4 Silver 1 Bronze 2 Total 7

European Athletics Championships appearances (overview)
- 1934; 1938; 1946; 1950; 1954; 1958; 1962; 1966; 1969; 1971; 1974; 1978; 1982; 1986; 1990; 1994; 1998; 2002; 2006; 2010; 2012; 2014; 2016; 2018; 2022; 2024

Netherlands competed at the 2016 European Athletics Championships in Amsterdam, Netherlands, between 6 and 10 July 2016.

== Medals ==
Medal	Name	Event	Date
Gold	Churandy Martina	Men's 100 metres	7 July
Gold	Dafne Schippers	Women's 100 metres	8 July
Gold	Anouk Vetter	Heptathlon	9 July
Gold	Dutch team Jamile Samuel; Dafne Schippers; Naomi Sedney; Tessa van Schagen	Women's 4 × 100 metres relay	10 July
Silver	Sifan Hassan	Women's 1500 metres	10 July
Bronze	Ignisious Gaisah	Men's long jump	8 July
Bronze	Liemarvin Bonevacia	Men's 400 metres	8 July

== Results ==
Men

Track & road events

Athlete	Event	Heat		Semifinal		Final	
Athlete	Event	Result	Rank	Result	Rank	Result	Rank
Solomon Bockarie	100 m	10.26	=5 Q	10.13 PB	5	10.25	7
Churandy Martina	100 m	Bye		10.16	8 Q	10.07 SB	1st place, gold medalist(s)
Hensley Paulina	100 m	10.36	11 Q	10.33	18	Did not advance	
Solomon Bockarie	200 m	20.55	=1 Q	20.39 PB	=2 Q	20.56	4
Churandy Martina	200 m	Bye		20.44	4 Q	DQ	
Hensley Paulina	200 m	21.04	11 q	23.49	23	Did not advance	
Liemarvin Bonevacia	400 m	Bye		45.68 SB	9 Q	45.41 SB	3rd place, bronze medalist(s)
Thijmen Kupers	800 m	1:46.48	1 Q	1:46.61	3 Q	1:46.67	6
Richard Douma	1500 m	3:39.80	5 q	—		3:47.32	4
Dennis Licht	5000 m	—				13:54.21	12
Gregory Sedoc	110 m hurdles	13.92	16	Did not advance			
Solomon Bockarie (only in final); Giovanni Codrington; Dimitri Juliet (only in heats); Churandy Martina; Patrick van Luijk	4 x 100 m relay	38.78	5 Q	—		38.57	4
Terrence Agard; Bjorn Blauwhof; Liemarvin Bonevacia; Maarten Stuivenberg	4 x 400 m relay	3:04.04	7 q	—		3:04.52	7
Michel Butter	Half marathon	—				1:05:24 SB	27
Khalid Choukoud	Half marathon	—				DNF	
Abdi Nageeye	Half marathon	—				1:03:43	6
Bart van Nunen	Half marathon	—				1:06:41	39
Tom Wiggers	Half marathon	—				1:06:29	36

Field Events

Athlete	Event	Qualification		Final	
Athlete	Event	Distance	Rank	Distance	Rank
Menno Vloon	Pole vault	5.35	=17	Did not advance	
Ignisious Gaisah	Long jump	7.97w	5 q	7.93	3rd place, bronze medalist(s)
Fabian Florant	Triple jump	16.45	12 q	16.23	10
Erik Cadée	Discus throw	61.93	17	Did not advance	
Rutger Smith	Discus throw	63.85 SB	11 q	59.99	11

Combined events – Decathlon

Athlete	Event	100 m	LJ	SP	HJ	400 m	110H	DT	PV	JT	1500 m	Final	Rank
Pieter Braun	Result	11.15	7.40 =SB	13.82	2.01 SB	49.78	14.49	40.90	4.60	56.86 SB	4:25.12 PB	7945	7
Pieter Braun	Points	827	910	717	813	825	912	683	790	691	777	7945	7
Eelco Sintnicolaas	Result	11.11	7.03	14.47 SB	1.89	50.41	16.24	41.94 SB	5.30 SB	57.24	DNF	7025	16
Eelco Sintnicolaas	Points	836	821	757	705	796	706	704	1004	696	0	7025	16

Women

Track & road events

Athlete	Event	Heat		Semifinal		Final	
Athlete	Event	Result	Rank	Result	Rank	Result	Rank
Naomi Sedney	100 m	11.36 SB	=2 Q	11.44	=10	Did not advance	
Dafne Schippers	100 m	Bye		10.96	1 Q	10.90	1st place, gold medalist(s)
Jamile Samuel	200 m	23.04 =SB	3 Q	23.02 SB	6 Q	22.83 SB	4
Laura de Witte	200 m	23.23 PB	8	23.48	16	Did not advance	
Tessa van Schagen	200 m	Bye		22.95	4 Q	23.03	7
Lisanne de Witte	400 m	52.84	4 Q	52.37	9	Did not advance	
Nicky van Leuveren	400 m	52.45	1 Q	52.02 PB	6 q	52.76	8
Sanne Verstegen	800 m	2:04.69	21 Q	2:03.33	21	Did not advance	
Sifan Hassan	1500 m	4:13.45	10 Q	—		4:33.76	2nd place, silver medalist(s)
Maureen Koster	5000 m	—				DNS	
Susan Kuijken	5000 m	—				15:23.87 SB	4
Jip Vastenburg	10000 m	—				32:04.00	8
Eefje Boons	100 m hurdles	13.07 PB	=6 Q	13.26	19	Did not advance	
Nadine Visser	100 m hurdles	Bye		13.25	18	Did not advance	
Bianca Baak	400 m hurdles	56.88	4 Q	56.34 PB	11	Did not advance	
Jamile Samuel; Dafne Schippers (only in final); Naomi Sedney; Marije van Hunenstijn (only in heats); Tessa van Schagen	4 x 100 m relay	43.34 SB	7 Q	—		42.04 NR	1st place, gold medalist(s)
Laura de Witte; Lisanne de Witte; Eva Hovenkamp; Nicky van Leuveren	4 x 400 m relay	3:29.18 NR	7 q	—		3:29.23	7
Elizeba Cherono	Half marathon	—				1:13:27	26
Kim Dillen	Half marathon	—				1:16:11	49
Ruth van der Meijden	Half marathon	—				1:14:12	34
Jamie van Lieshout	Half marathon	—				1:17:36	62
National team	Half marathon	—				3:43:50	9

Field Events

Athlete	Event	Qualification		Final	
Athlete	Event	Distance	Rank	Distance	Rank
Rianna Galiart	Pole vault	4.35 SB	=11 q	NM	
Femke Pluim	Pole vault	4.45 =SB	=2 q	4.45 =SB	6
Melissa Boekelman	Shot put	17.50	5 Q	17.92	8
Corinne Nugter	Discus throw	55.52	18	Did not advance	

Combined events – Heptathlon

Athlete	Event	100H	HJ	SP	200 m	LJ	JT	800 m	Final	Rank
Nadine Broersen	Result	13.70	1.74	14.45	25.51	6.40	52.31 SB	DNS	DNF	
Nadine Broersen	Points	1021	903	824	841	975	905	0	DNF	
Anouk Vetter	Result	13.29 PB	1.74	15.69 PB	23.89	6.38	55.76 PB	2:21.50	6626 NR	1st place, gold medalist(s)
Anouk Vetter	Points	1081	903	907	991	969	972	803	6626 NR	1st place, gold medalist(s)
