= Netherlands at the 2022 European Athletics Championships =

- Flag of the Netherlands
- WA code: NED
- National federation: Royal Dutch Athletics Federation

in Munich, Germany 15 August 2022 – 21 August 2022
- Competitors: 58 (23 men and 30 women) in 29 events
- Medals Ranked 5th: Gold 4 Silver 0 Bronze 2 Total 6

European Athletics Championships appearances (overview)
- 1934; 1938; 1946; 1950; 1954; 1958; 1962; 1966; 1969; 1971; 1974; 1978; 1982; 1986; 1990; 1994; 1998; 2002; 2006; 2010; 2012; 2014; 2016; 2018; 2022; 2024; 2026

Netherlands competed at the 2022 European Athletics Championships in Munich, Germany, between 15 and 21 August 2022.

== Medallists ==
Medal	Name	Event	Date
Gold	Jessica Schilder	Women's shot put	15 August
Gold	Femke Bol	Women's 400 metres	17 August
Gold	Femke Bol	Women's 400 metres hurdles	19 August
Gold	Eveline Saalberg; Lieke Klaver; Lisanne de Witte; Femke Bol; Andrea Bouma; Laura de Witte	Women's 4 × 400 metres relay	20 August
Bronze	Nienke Brinkman	Women's marathon	15 August
Bronze	Jorinde van Klinken	Women's shot put	15 August

== Results ==
Netherlands has qualified 27 male and 34 female athletes.

=== Men ===
Track and road events

Athlete	Event	Heat		Semifinal		Final	
Athlete	Event	Result	Rank	Result	Rank	Result	Rank
Joris van Gool	100 m	10.45	14	did not advance			
Taymir Burnet	200 m	20.48	2 Q	20.44	10	did not advance	
Liemarvin Bonevacia	400 m	Bye		45.40	3 Q	45.17	4
Jochem Dobber	400 m	46.36	22	did not advance			
Tony van Diepen	800 m	1:47.67	16 Q	1:47.64	6	did not advance	
Djoao Lobles	800 m	1:48.00	23	did not advance			
Mike Foppen	5000 m	—N/a				13:27.93	5
Koen Smet	110 m hurdles	13.88	14	14.06	23	did not advance	
Ramsey Angela	400 m hurdles	49.51	5 Q	49.99	19	did not advance	
Nick Smidt	400 m hurdles	50.06	8 Q	50.29	20	did not advance	
Elvis Afrifa; Taymir Burnet; Joris van Gool; Raphael Bouju	4x100 m relay	38.83	6 Q	—N/a		38.25	4
Isayah Boers; Liemarvin Bonevacia; Jochem Dobber; Ramsey Angela	4x400 m relay	3:01.57	3 Q	—N/a		3:01.34	5
Tom Hendrikse	Marathon	—N/a				2:19:21	40
Ronald Schröer	Marathon	—N/a				2:19:40	42

Field events

Athlete	Event	Qualification		Final	
Athlete	Event	Result	Rank	Result	Rank
Douwe Amels	High jump	2.21	=5 q	NM	
Rutger Koppelaar	Pole vault	5.65	=1 q	5.75	4
Menno Vloon	Pole vault	5.65	9 q	NM	
Ruben Rolvink	Discus throw	60.12	19	did not advance	
Denzel Comenentia	Hammer throw	68.89	23	did not advance	

Combined events – Decathlon

Athlete	Event	100 m	LJ	SP	HJ	400 m	110H	DT	PV	JT	1500 m	Final	Rank
Sven Roosen	Result	10.83	7.14	14.13	1.84	47.69 SB	14.45	38.40	4.80	59.74	4:18.43	8021	10
Sven Roosen	Points	899	847	736	661	924	917	632	849	734	822	8021	10
Rik Taam	Result	10.76	7.29	13.97	1.93	47.61	DNS					DNF	
Rik Taam	Points	915	883	727	740	928	DNS					DNF	

=== Women ===
Track and road events

Athlete	Event	Heat		Semifinal		Final	
Athlete	Event	Result	Rank	Result	Rank	Result	Rank
Jamile Samuel	200 m	23.00	3 Q	23.13	8	did not advance	
Lieke Klaver	200 m	Bye		22.92	4 Q	22.88	5
Lieke Klaver	400 m	Bye		50.59	4 Q	50.56	6
Eveline Saalberg	400 m	51.81	6 Q	52.45	19	did not advance	
Femke Bol	400 m	Bye		50.60	5 Q	49.44	1st place, gold medalist(s)
Femke Bol	400 m hurdles	Bye		53.73	1 Q	52.67	1st place, gold medalist(s)
Maureen Koster	5000 m	—N/a				15:03.29	4
Diane van Es	5000 m	—N/a				15:26.44	13
Silke Jonkman	10,000 m	—N/a				32:30.92	11
Jasmijn Lau	10,000 m	—N/a				33:14.00	16
Maayke Tjin-A-Lim	100 m hurdles	13.26	4 Q	13.21	19	did not advance	
Nadine Visser	100 m hurdles	Bye		12.74	4 Q	12.75	4
Zoë Sedney	100 m hurdles	Bye		13.42	21	did not advance	
N'Ketia Seedo; Zoë Sedney; Minke Bisschops; Naomi Sedney	4×100 m relay	43.75	8 q	—N/a		43.03	5
Andrea Bouma*; Lieke Klaver; Laura de Witte*; Lisanne de Witte; Femke Bol; Eveline Saalberg	4×400 m relay	3:25.84	3 Q	—N/a		3:20.87	1st place, gold medalist(s)
Nienke Brinkman	Marathon	—N/a				2:28:52	3rd place, bronze medalist(s)
Jill Holterman	Marathon	—N/a				2:35:25 SB	21
Bo Ummels	Marathon	—N/a				3:00:56	52 SB
Ruth van der Meijden	Marathon	—N/a				DNF	
Nienke Brinkman; Jill Holterman; Bo Ummels; Ruth van der Meijden	Marathon Cup	—N/a				8:05:13	8

Field events

Athlete	Event	Qualification		Final	
Athlete	Event	Result	Rank	Result	Rank
Britt Weerman	High jump	1.87	=5 q	1.93	4
Benthe König	Shot put	17.27	13	did not advance	
Jessica Schilder	Shot put	18.95	2 Q	20.24	1st place, gold medalist(s)
Jorinde van Klinken	Shot put	18.62	4 Q	18.94	3rd place, bronze medalist(s)
Jorinde van Klinken	Discus throw	62.18	7	64.43	4
Alida van Daalen	Discus throw	56.05	18	did not advance	

Combined events – Heptathlon

Athlete	Event	100H	HJ	SP	200 m	LJ	JT	800 m	Final	Rank
Sofie Dokter	Result	13.81	1.80	12.78	24.57	5.82	35.82	2:21.29	5811	11
Sofie Dokter	Points	1005	978	713	927	795	587	806	5811	11
Emma Oosterwegel	Result	DNF	DNS						DNF	
Emma Oosterwegel	Points	0	DNS						DNF	
Anouk Vetter	Result	13.37	1.71	15.68	24.00	6.27	DNS		DNF	
Anouk Vetter	Points	1069	867	907	981	934	DNS		DNF	
