= Netherlands at the 2024 European Athletics Championships =

- Flag of Netherlands
- WA code: NED
- National federation: Royal Dutch Athletics Federation

in Rome, Italy 7 June 2024 – 12 June 2022
- Competitors: 59 (30 men and 29 women) in 33 events
- Medals Ranked 6th: Gold 3 Silver 4 Bronze 5 Total 12

European Athletics Championships appearances (overview)
- 1934; 1938; 1946; 1950; 1954; 1958; 1962; 1966; 1969; 1971; 1974; 1978; 1982; 1986; 1990; 1994; 1998; 2002; 2006; 2010; 2012; 2014; 2016; 2018; 2022; 2024

Athletes from the Netherlands competed at the 2024 European Athletics Championships in the Stadio Olimpico in Rome, Italy from 7 to 12 June 2024.

With three gold, four silver, and five bronze medals, the Dutch athletes won the more medals than in any previous edition of the European Athletics Championships. Nine medals were won in the women's competitions, two medals in the men's competition, and one medal in the mixed relay. The Netherlands ranked 6th in the championship's overall medal table.

Femke Bol, Jessica Schilder, and the women's 4 × 400 metres relay team won gold medals. Bol and Lieke Klaver each won three medals and Liemarvin Bonevacia, Jorinde van Klinken, and Cathelijn Peeters won two medals each. Bol also received a Golden Crown for the highest scoring performance in the women's sprints and hurdles category.

== Medallists ==
Medal	Name	Event	Date
Gold	Jessica Schilder	Women's shot put	7 June
Gold	Femke Bol	Women's 400 metres hurdles	11 June
Gold	Lieke Klaver; Cathelijn Peeters; Lisanne de Witte; Femke Bol; Eveline Saalberg (heats); Anne van de Wiel (heats); Myrte van der Schoot (heats)	Women's 4 × 400 metres relay	12 June
Silver	Jorinde van Klinken	Women's shot put	7 June
Silver	Jorinde van Klinken	Women's discus throw	8 June
Silver	Diane van Es	Women's 10,000 metres	11 June
Silver	Elvis Afrifa; Taymir Burnet; Xavi Mo-Ajok; Nsikak Ekpo	Men's 4 × 100 metres relay	12 June
Bronze	Liemarvin Bonevacia; Lieke Klaver; Isaya Klein Ikkink; Femke Bol	Mixed 4 × 400 metres relay	7 June
Bronze	Liemarvin Bonevacia	Men's 400 metres	10 June
Bronze	Lieke Klaver	Women's 400 metres	10 June
Bronze	Cathelijn Peeters	Women's 400 metres hurdles	11 June
Bronze	Nadine Visser; Marije van Hunenstijn; Minke Bisschops; Tasa Jiya	Women's 4 × 100 metres relay	12 June

== Results ==
Netherlands entered the following athletes.

Key

- Q = Qualified for the next round
- q = Qualified for the next round as a fastest loser or, in field events, by position without achieving the qualifying target
- DNS = Did not start
- DNF = Did not finish
- — = Round not applicable for the event
- CR = Championship record
- EM35R = European masters over-35 record
- PB = Personal best
- WL = World leading result
- EL = European leading result
- EU23L = European under-23 leading result
- SB = Season best

=== Men ===
Track and road events

Athlete	Event	Heat		Semifinal		Final	
Athlete	Event	Result	Rank	Result	Rank	Result	Rank
Taymir Burnet	100 metres	Bye		10.33	16	Did not advance	
Taymir Burnet	200 metres	Bye		21.02	23	Did not advance	
Liemarvin Bonevacia	400 metres	Bye		45.17 SB	7 Q	44.88 SB EM35R	3rd place, bronze medalist(s)
Ryan Clarke	800 metres	1:45.25	6 q	1:46.00	6	Did not advance	
Niels Laros	800 metres	1:46.62 SB	23	Did not advance			
Noah Baltus	1500 metres	3:45.30	13	—N/a		Did not advance	
Mahadi Abdi Ali	5000 metres	—N/a				13:25.65	9
Mike Foppen	5000 metres	—N/a				13:32.77	18
Tim Verbaandert	5000 metres	—N/a				14:01.18 SB	27
Noah Schutte	10,000 metres	—N/a				28:28.52	21
Filmon Tesfu	Half marathon	—N/a				1:02:42 SB	19
Job Geerds	110 metres hurdles	DNF		Did not advance			
Mark Heiden	110 metres hurdles	Bye		24.42	22	Did not advance	
Timme Koster	110 metres hurdles	13.70 SB	6 q	13.72	18	Did not advance	
Nick Smidt	400 metres hurdles	Bye		49.57	15 Q	49.43	8
Elvis Afrifa; Taymir Burnet; Xavi Mo-Ajok; Nsikak Ekpo	4 × 100 metres relay	38.34	1 Q	—N/a		38.46	2nd place, silver medalist(s)
Isayah Boers; Terrence Agard; Ramsey Angela; Isaya Klein Ikkink	4 × 400 metres relay	3:03.50	9	—N/a		Did not advance	

Field events

Athlete	Event	Qualification		Final	
Athlete	Event	Distance	Position	Distance	Position
Douwe Amels	High jump	2.21	10 q	2.17	11
Menno Vloon	Pole vault	5.60	13 q	5.75	8
Shaquille Emanuelson	Discus throw	63.36	8 q	61.96	11
Ruben Rolvink	Discus throw	58.74	26	Did not advance	
Denzel Comenentia	Hammer throw	73.45	16	Did not advance	

Combined events – Decathlon

Athlete	Event	100 m	LJ	SP	HJ	400 m	110H	DT	PV	JT	1500 m	Final	Rank
Jeff Tesselaar	Result	10.85 SB	7.76 PB	13.53	1.96	47.77 PB	14.61 SB	46.13 PB	4.20	51.05 PB	4:16.77	8079 PB	12
Jeff Tesselaar	Points	894	1000	700	767	920	897	790	673	604	834	8079 PB	12

=== Women ===
Track and road events

Athlete	Event	Heat		Semifinal		Final	
Athlete	Event	Result	Rank	Result	Rank	Result	Rank
Tasa Jiya	200 metres	Bye		22.70 SB	3 Q	22.90	5
Lieke Klaver	400 metres	Bye		50.57	2 Q	50.08 SB	3rd place, bronze medalist(s)
Marissa Damink	1500 metres	4:13.16	8	—N/a		Did not advance	
Maureen Koster	5000 metres	—N/a				14:44.46 PB	4
Veerle Bakker	10,000 metres	—N/a				33:07.14	18
Jennifer Gulikers	10,000 metres	—N/a				DNF	
Silke Jonkman	10,000 metres	—N/a				32:38.73 SB	13
Jasmijn Lau	10,000 metres	—N/a				32:15.91 PB	7
Diane van Es	10,000 metres	—N/a				30:57.24 PB	2nd place, silver medalist(s)
Jacelyn Gruppen	Half marathon	—N/a				1:13:26	42
Anne Luijten	Half marathon	—N/a				1:12:17	33
Maayke Tjin-A-Lim	100 metres hurdles	Bye		13.08	20	Did not advance	
Nadine Visser	100 metres hurdles	Bye		12.81	7 Q	12.72 SB	5
Femke Bol	400 metres hurdles	Bye		54.16	1 Q	52.49 CR WL	1st place, gold medalist(s)
Cathelijn Peeters	400 metres hurdles	Bye		54.66	8 Q	54.37	3rd place, bronze medalist(s)
Nadine Visser; Marije van Hunenstijn; Minke Bisschops; Tasa Jiya	4 × 100 metres relay	42.39 SB	3 Q	—N/a		42.46	3rd place, bronze medalist(s)
Lieke Klaver; Cathelijn Peeters; Lisanne de Witte; Femke Bol; Eveline Saalberg (heats); Anne van de Wiel (heats); Myrte van der Schoot (heats)	4 × 400 metres relay	3:25.99	8 Q	—N/a		3:22.39 EL	1st place, gold medalist(s)

Field events

Athlete	Event	Qualification		Final	
Athlete	Event	Distance	Position	Distance	Position
Pauline Hondema	Long jump	6.63 SB	13	Did not advance	
Benthe König	Shot put	17.02	13	Did not advance	
Jessica Schilder	Shot put	18.32	4 Q	18.77	1st place, gold medalist(s)
Jorinde van Klinken	Shot put	18.13	7 Q	18.67 SB	2nd place, silver medalist(s)
Jorinde van Klinken	Discus throw	65.12 SB	2 Q	65.99 SB	2nd place, silver medalist(s)

Combined events – Heptathlon

Athlete	Event	100H	HJ	SP	200 m	LJ	JT	800 m	Final	Rank
Sofie Dokter	Result	13.77	1.80	13.71	23.72 SB	6.30	47.17 PB	2:14.63	6418 EU23L	5
Sofie Dokter	Points	1011	978	775	1008	943	805	898	6418 EU23L	5
Marijke Esselink	Result	DNS								
Marijke Esselink	Points	DNS								

=== Mixed ===
Track and road events

Athlete	Event	Final	
Athlete	Event	Result	Rank
Liemarvin Bonevacia; Lieke Klaver; Isaya Klein Ikkink; Femke Bol	4 × 400 metres relay	3:10.73 SB	3rd place, bronze medalist(s)
