= Netherlands at the 2010 European Athletics Championships =

- WA code: NED
- National federation: NOC*NSF
- Website: www.nocnsf.nl

in Barcelona
- Medals Ranked 11th: Gold 1 Silver 1 Bronze 1 Total 3

European Athletics Championships appearances (overview)
- 1934; 1938; 1946; 1950; 1954; 1958; 1962; 1966; 1969; 1971; 1974; 1978; 1982; 1986; 1990; 1994; 1998; 2002; 2006; 2010; 2012; 2014; 2016; 2018; 2022; 2024

The Netherlands were represented by 36 athletes at the 2010 European Athletics Championships held at the Estadi Olímpic Lluís Companys in Barcelona, Spain from 27 July to 1 August 2010.

== Participants ==
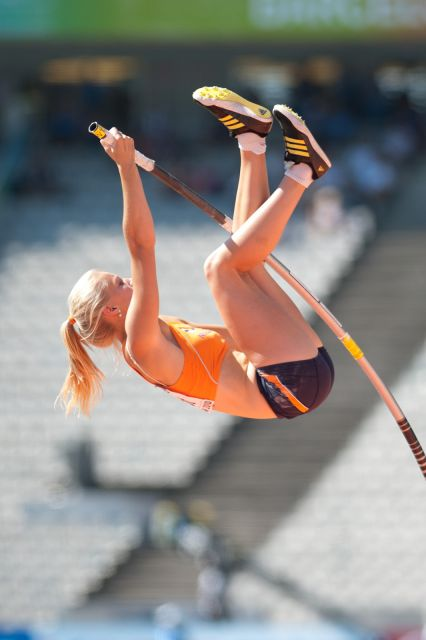
Denise Groot

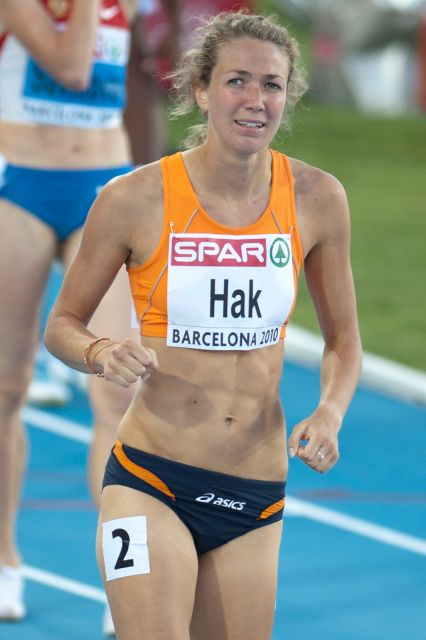
Yvonne Hak

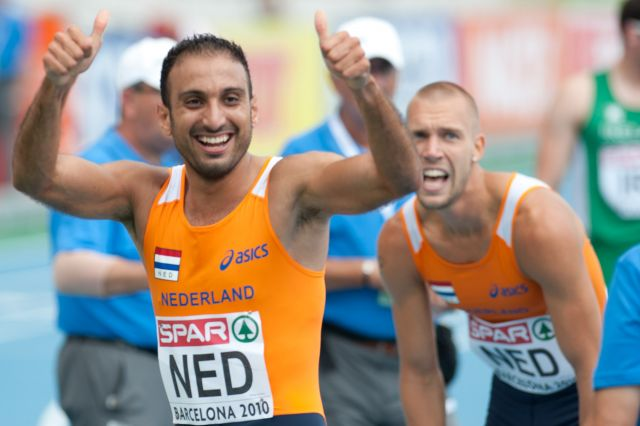
Youssef el Rhalfioui

Event	Men	Women
800 m	Robert Lathouwers; Arnoud Okken; Bram Som	Yvonne Hak
1500 m	Niels Verwer	Susan Kuijken
10,000 m		Hilda Kibet
Marathon	Rens Dekkers; Koen Raymaekers; Ronald Schröer; Patrick Stitzinger; Robert Ton; Hugo van den Broek	
110 m hurdles	Gregory Sedoc; Marcel van der Westen	—
High jump	Martijn Nuijens	
Pole vault	Robbert-Jan Jansen	Denise Groot
Shot put		Melissa Boekelman
Discus throw	Erik Cadée	Monique Jansen
Javelin throw		Bregje Crolla; Evelien Dekkers
Heptathlon	—	Jolanda Keizer
Decathlon	Eelco Sintnicolaas; Ingmar Vos	—
4 × 100 m relay		Esther Akihary; Anouk Hagen; Loreanne Kuhurima; Jamile Samuel; Femke van der Meij; Kadene Vassell
4 × 400 m relay	Bjorn Blauwhof; Youssef el Rhalfioui; Robert Lathouwers; Joeri Moerman; Dennis Spillekom	

== Medal count ==
2010 Barcelona	Gold	Silver	Bronze	Total
Netherlands (NED)	1	1	1	3

== See also ==
Netherlands at other European Championships in 2010

- Netherlands at the 2010 UEC European Track Championships
