= Netherlands at the 2006 European Athletics Championships =

Netherlands at the 2010 European Athletics Championships
- WA code: NED
- National federation: NOC*NSF
- Website: www.nocnsf.nl

in Barcelona
- Medals Ranked 16th: Gold 1 Silver 1 Bronze 1 Total 3

European Athletics Championships appearances (overview)
- 1934; 1938; 1946; 1950; 1954; 1958; 1962; 1966; 1969; 1971; 1974; 1978; 1982; 1986; 1990; 1994; 1998; 2002; 2006; 2010; 2012; 2014; 2016; 2018; 2022; 2024

The Netherlands were represented at the 2006 European Athletics Championships by the following athletes.

== Results ==
2006 Gothenburg	Gold	Silver	Bronze	Total
Netherlands (NED)	1	1	1	3

Place	Athlete	Event	Result
1	Bram Som	800 metres	1:46.56 min
2	Karin Ruckstuhl	Heptathlon	6423 pts (NR)
3	Rutger Smith	Shot put	20.90

== Athletes ==
Men's 200 metres:

- Caimin Douglas - Round 2, 21.18 s (did not advance)
- Patrick van Luijk - Round 2, 21.46 s (did not advance)
- Guus Hoogmoed - Semi final, 20.80 s (did not advance)

Women's 200 metres:

- Jacqueline Poelman - Round 2, 24.01 s (did not advance)

Men's 400 metres:

- Youssef El Rhalfioui - Round 1, 47.12 s (did not advance)

Women's 400 metres:

- Romara van Noort - Round 1, 52.64 s (PB, did not advance)

Men's 800 metres:

- Bram Som - Final, 1:46.56 min (gold medal)

Women's 1500 metres:

- Bob Winter - Semi final, 3:48.35 min (did not advance)

Women's 1500 metres:

- Adriënne Herzog - Semi final, 4:11.16 min (PB, did not advance)

Men's 5000 metres:

- Gert-Jan Liefers - Final, 13:58.70 min (8th place)

Women's 10,000 metres:

- Lornah Kiplagat - Final, 30:37.26 min (SB, 5th place)
- Selma Borst - Final, 32:41.12 min (PB, 19th place)

Men's marathon:

- Luc Krotwaar - 2:12:44 hrs (4th place)
- Kamiel Maase - 2:13:46 hrs (9th place)
- Sander Schutgens - 2:17:11 hrs (PB, 19th place)
- Hugo van den Broek - 2:17:25 hrs (22nd place)

Men's 110 metre hurdles:

- Marcel van der Westen - Round 1, 13.73 s (did not advance)
- Gregory Sedoc - Semi final, DQ (did not advance)

Men's 3000 metre steeplechase:

- Simon Vroemen - Final, DNS

Women's 3000 metre steeplechase:

- Andrea Deelstra - Semi final, 10:46.12 min (did not advance)
- Miranda Boonstra - Final, 10:20.01 min (12th place)

Men's 4x100 metre relay:

- Timothy Beck, Caimin Douglas, Guus Hoogmoed, and Patrick van Luijk - 39.64 (8th place)

Men's high jump:

- Jan-Peter Larsen - Qualification, 2.05 metres (did not advance)
- Wilbert Pennings - Final, 2.20 metres (12th place)

Men's pole vault:

- Laurens Looije - Final, 5.50 metres (8th place)
- Christian Tamminga - Final, 5.40 metres (15th place)

Women's pole vault:

- Rianna Galiart - Qualification, 4.00 metres (did not advance)

Women's long jump:

- Karin Ruckstuhl - Qualification, 6.29 metres (did not advance)

Men's shot put:

- Rutger Smith - Final, 20.90 metres (4th place)

Women's shot put:

- Denise Kemkers - Qualification, 15.98 metres (did not advance)

Men's discus:

- Rutger Smith - Final, 64.46 metres (7th place)

Men's decathlon:

- Eugène Martineau - 8035 points (11th place)

Women's heptathlon:

- Karin Ruckstuhl - 6423 points (NR, silver medal)

== See also ==
Netherlands at other European Championships in 2006

- Netherlands at the 2006 European Road Championships
