= 2024 European Athletics Championships – Women's 400 metres hurdles =

Women's 400 metres hurdles at the 2024 European Athletics Championships
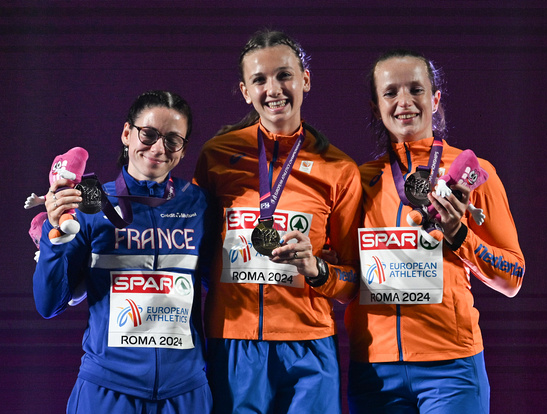
- Louise Maraval, Femke Bol, and Cathelijn Peeters at the medal ceremony on 11 June 2024
- Venue: Stadio Olimpico
- Location: Rome, Italy
- Dates: 9 June 2024 (round 1); 10 June 2024 (semi-finals); 11 June 2024 (final)
- Competitors: 35 from 21 nations
- Winning time: 52.49 s CR

Medalists
gold medal	Femke Bol	Netherlands
silver medal	Louise Maraval	France
bronze medal	Cathelijn Peeters	Netherlands

The women's 400 metres hurdles at the 2024 European Athletics Championships took place in three rounds at the Stadio Olimpico in Rome, Italy, from 9 to 11 June 2024. This was the sixteenth time that the women's 400 metres hurdles was contested at the European Athletics Championships. A total of 37 athletes qualified for the event by entry standard, ranking, or wild card. The startlists contained 35 athletes from 21 nations.

The three heats of the first round were held on 9 June, where the thirteen fastest athletes qualified for the semi-finals in addition to the eleven athletes with the highest ranking who had a bye in the first round and automatically qualified for the semi-finals. The three heats of the semi-finals were held on 10 June, where the two fastest athletes of each heat and the two fastest of the rest qualified for the final. Fatoumata Binta Diallo set a Portuguese record of 54.65 seconds in the semi-finals.

The final was held on 11 June. Femke Bol from the Netherlands finished in first place in 52.49 seconds, breaking her previous championship record and successfully defending her European title from 2022. Louise Maraval from France finished second in 54.23 seconds, followed by Cathelijn Peeters from the Netherlands in third place in 54.37 seconds.

== Background ==
At the European Athletics Championships, the women's 400 metres hurdles was introduced at the 1978 edition in Prague, Czechoslovakia and had been contested fifteen times before 2024: every four years until 2010 and every two years after, with the exception of the 2020 edition that was cancelled due to the coronavirus pandemic. At the previous edition in 2022, Femke Bol won in a championship record of 52.67 seconds. At the start of the 2024 edition, Bol also held the European record of 51.45 seconds and had a European leading time of 53.07 seconds. The world record and the world leading time were set by Sydney McLaughlin-Levrone from the United States.

Records before the 2024 European Athletics Championships
Record	Athlete (nation)	Time (s)	Location	Date
World record	Sydney McLaughlin-Levrone (USA)	50.68	Eugene, United States	22 July 2022
European record	Femke Bol (NED)	51.45	London, United Kingdom	23 July 2023
Championship record	Femke Bol (NED)	52.67	Munich, Germany	19 August 2022
World leading	Sydney McLaughlin-Levrone (USA)	52.70	Atlanta, United States	31 May 2024
Europe leading	Femke Bol (NED)	53.07	Stockholm, Sweden	2 June 2024

== Qualification ==
For the women's 400 metres hurdles event, the qualification period was from 27 May 2023 to 26 May 2024. Athletes could qualify by running the entry standard of 55.70 seconds or faster, by ranking in the top 100 of the World Athletics Ranking for this event, or by receiving a wild card. The only wild card was given to Femke Bol, but she would also have qualified with her European record of 51.45 seconds from 23 July 2023 or with her No. 1 event ranking. A total of 37 athletes qualified: 21 by entry standard, 15 by ranking, and 1 by wild card. A maximum of three athletes per nation could compete, or four when a wild card was given, which led to one athlete from Italy being cut. The remaining places were filled with the next best ranking athletes. A final entry list containing 38 athletes from 22 nations was published on 3 June 2024. The eventual startlists contained 35 athletes from 21 nations.

== Rounds ==
=== Round 1 ===
On 9 June 2024, the first round was held in three heats, starting at 12:40 (UTC+2) in the afternoon. There were 24 athletes on the startlist, of whom 22 finished their races. The thirteen fastest athletes advanced to the semi-finals (q); the eleven highest-ranked athletes received a bye in the first round and automatically qualified for the semi-finals (Q). Five athletes set personal bests (PB), and another two athletes equalled their personal best times (=PB).

Results of round 1
Rank	Heat	Lane	Name	Nation	Time (s)	Note
1	3	4	Nikoleta Jíchová	Czech Republic	54.88	q, =PB
2	2	8	Eileen Demes	Germany	55.25	q, PB
3	3	2	Yasmin Giger	Switzerland	55.33	q, SB
4	3	3	Kristiina Halonen	Finland	55.62	q, PB
5	2	6	Daniela Fra	Spain	55.71	q, PB
6	2	3	Paulien Couckuyt	Belgium	55.73	q
7	3	7	Fatoumata Binta Diallo	Portugal	55.81	q
8	1	2	Sára Mátó	Hungary	55.95	q
9	3	5	Linda Olivieri	Italy	55.95	q
10	3	8	Moa Granat	Sweden	55.95	q, EU23L
11	2	2	Daniela Ledecká	Slovakia	56.17	q, SB
12	1	4	Amalie Iuel	Norway	56.23	q
13	2	9	Izabela Smolińska	Poland	56.24	q, PB
14	1	3	Hilla Uusimäki	Finland	56.40	
15	2	5	Annina Fahr	Switzerland	56.59	SB
16	2	4	Dimitra Gnafaki	Greece	56.62	SB
17	1	6	Vera Barbosa	Portugal	56.81	
18	1	7	Anna Gryc	Poland	56.91	=PB
19	3	9	Kelly McGrory	Ireland	57.10	PB
20	3	6	Elisabeth Slettum	Norway	57.16	SB
21	1	8	Agata Zupin	Slovenia	57.83	
22	1	9	Mariya Buryak	Ukraine	58.40	
	1	5	Alexandra Ştefania Uţă	Romania	DNF	
	2	7	Janka Molnár	Hungary	DNS	

=== Semi-finals ===
On 10 June 2024, 24 athletes competed in the semi-finals, divided over three heats, starting at 13:15 (UTC+2) in the afternoon. The first two athletes in each heat (Q) and the two fastest athletes of the rest (q) advanced to the final. In the first heat, Fatoumata Binta Diallo set a Portuguese record (NR) of 54.65 seconds; and another eight athletes set personal bests (PB) in various heats of the semi-finals.

Results of the semi-finals
Rank	Heat	Lane	Name	Nation	Time (s)	Note
1	2	5	Femke Bol*	Netherlands	54.16	Q
2	1	6	Louise Maraval*	France	54.36	Q, PB
3	1	8	Lina Nielsen*	Great Britain & N.I.	54.43	Q, PB
4	1	7	Ayomide Folorunso*	Italy	54.52	q, SB
5	3	7	Line Kloster*	Norway	54.56	Q, SB
6	2	7	Nikoleta Jíchová	Czech Republic	54.59	Q, PB
7	1	4	Fatoumata Binta Diallo	Portugal	54.65	q, NR
8	3	5	Cathelijn Peeters*	Netherlands	54.66	Q
9	3	8	Alice Muraro*	Italy	54.73	PB
10	2	4	Amalie Iuel	Norway	54.89	=SB
11	2	6	Viivi Lehikoinen*	Finland	54.92	SB
12	2	8	Anna Ryzhykova*	Ukraine	54.95	SB
13	2	9	Linda Olivieri	Italy	54.99	PB
14	1	9	Yasmin Giger	Switzerland	55.05	PB
15	3	9	Paulien Couckuyt	Belgium	55.24	
16	2	2	Sára Mátó	Hungary	55.35	PB
17	1	5	Hanne Claes*	Belgium	55.36	SB
18	3	4	Eileen Demes	Germany	55.64	
19	1	3	Kristiina Halonen	Finland	55.83	
20	1	2	Daniela Ledecká	Slovakia	55.83	PB
21	3	2	Moa Granat	Sweden	55.89	EU23L
22	3	6	Jessie Knight*	Great Britain & N.I.	56.01	
23	3	3	Daniela Fra	Spain	56.27	
24	2	3	Izabela Smolińska	Poland	56.78	

*Athletes who received a bye into the semi-finals

=== Final ===
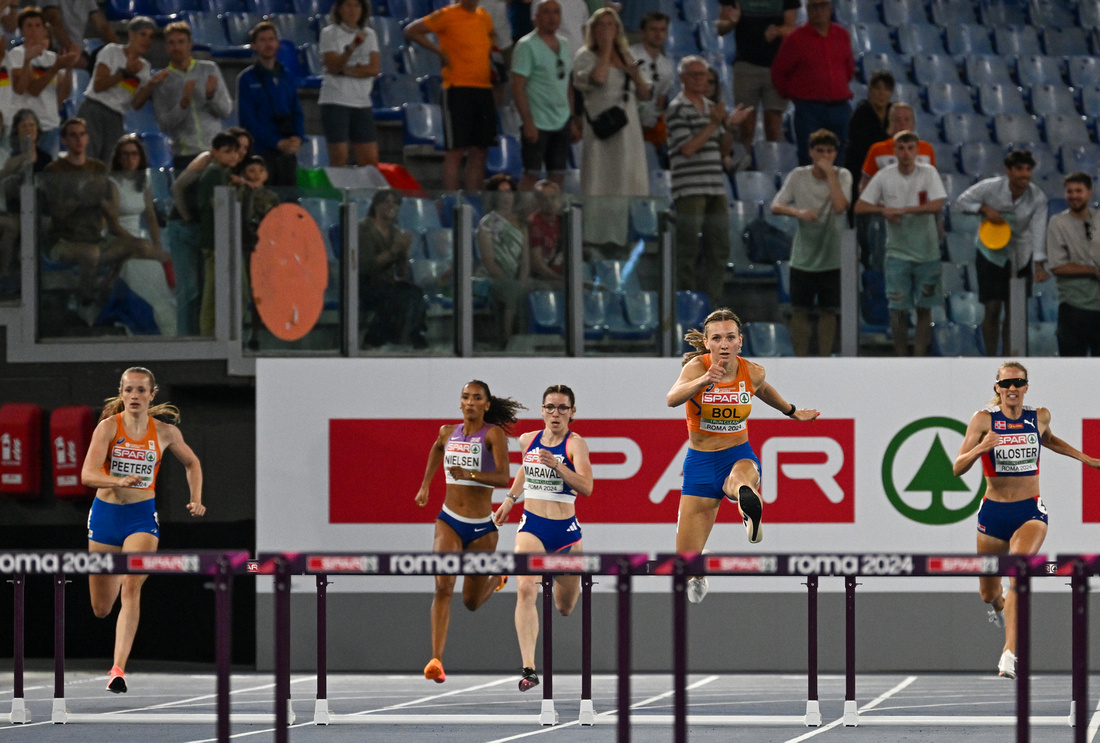
Lanes 9 to 5 during the last 100 metres of the final on 11 June 2024

On 11 June 2024, the final race with eight athletes was held at 21:18 (UTC+2) in the evening. Femke Bol of the Netherlands was leading the race from the second hurdle, gradually increasing her lead over the next eight hurdles and finishing first in 52.49 seconds. With this time, she set a world leading mark (WL) and broke her own championship record (CR) of 52.67 seconds by 0.18 seconds. In addition to a gold medal, Bol also received a golden crown for the highest scoring performance in the category of women's sprints and hurdles at this tournament. Louise Maraval of France finished in second place 1.74 seconds after Bol, setting a new personal best (PB) of 54.23 seconds, and another 0.14 seconds later, Cathelijn Peeters of the Netherlands finished third in 54.37 seconds. The medal ceremony was later that evening.

Results of the final
Rank	Lane	Name	Nation	Time (s)	Note
1st place, gold medalist(s)	6	Femke Bol	Netherlands	52.49	CR, WL
2nd place, silver medalist(s)	7	Louise Maraval	France	54.23	PB
3rd place, bronze medalist(s)	9	Cathelijn Peeters	Netherlands	54.37	
4	4	Nikoleta Jíchová	Czech Republic	54.91	
5	2	Ayomide Folorunso	Italy	55.20	
6	5	Line Kloster	Norway	55.29	
7	8	Lina Nielsen	Great Britain & N.I.	55.65	
8	3	Fatoumata Binta Diallo	Portugal	55.65	
