= Netherlands at the 1978 European Athletics Championships =

- WA code: NED

in Prague
- Competitors: 25
- Medals: Gold 0 Silver 0 Bronze 0 Total 0

European Athletics Championships appearances (overview)
- 1934; 1938; 1946; 1950; 1954; 1958; 1962; 1966; 1969; 1971; 1974; 1978; 1982; 1986; 1990; 1994; 1998; 2002; 2006; 2010; 2012; 2014; 2016; 2018; 2022; 2024

The Netherlands sent 25 athletes to the 1978 European Athletics Championships which took place 29 August–3 September 1978 in Prague. Netherlands won no medals at the Championships.
