= Silke Jonkman =

Dutch long-distance runner

Personal information
- Born: 26 January 1997 (age 29)

Sport
- Country: Netherlands
- Sport: Athletics
- Club: Team 4 Mijl

Silke Jonkman (born 26 January, 1997) is a Dutch athlete. Jonkman represents the Netherlands internationally. She is trained by Eddy Kiemel. In 2021 she won the silver medal at the national championships in the cross event. In April 2022 she won the Klap tot Klaploop.

She competed at the 2022 European Athletics Championships in the 10,000 metres event, where she finished eleventh.
