= 2014 European Athletics Championships – Women's 5000 metres =

Women's 5000 metres at the European Athletics Championships

The women's 5000 metres at the 2014 European Athletics Championships took place at the Letzigrund on 16 August.

== Medalists ==
Gold	Meraf Bahta; Sweden
Silver	Sifan Hassan; Netherlands
Bronze	Susan Kuijken; Netherlands

== Records ==
Standing records prior to the 2014 European Athletics Championships
World record	Tirunesh Dibaba (ETH)	14:11.15	Oslo, Norway	6 June 2008
European record	Liliya Shobukhova (RUS)	14:23.75	Kazan, Russia	19 July 2008
Championship record	Alemitu Bekele (TUR)	14:52.20	Barcelona, Spain	1 August 2010
World Leading	Genzebe Dibaba (ETH)	14:28.88	Fontvieille, Monaco	18 July 2014
European Leading	Sifan Hassan (NED)	14:59.23	Palo Alto, United States	4 May 2014

== Schedule ==
Date	Time	Round
16 August 2014	17:40	Final

All times are local times (UTC+2)

== Results ==
=== Final ===
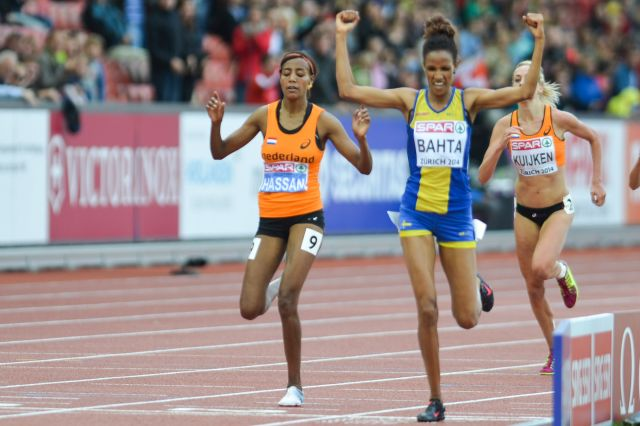
The finish

Rank	Name	Nationality	Time	Note
1st place, gold medalist(s)	Meraf Bahta	Sweden	15:31.39	
2nd place, silver medalist(s)	Sifan Hassan	Netherlands	15:31.79	
3rd place, bronze medalist(s)	Susan Kuijken	Netherlands	15:32.82	
4	Nuria Fernández	Spain	15:35.59	
5	Sara Moreira	Portugal	15:38.13	
6	Jo Pavey	United Kingdom	15:38.41	
7	Giulia Viola	Italy	15:38.76	PB
8	Emelia Gorecka	United Kingdom	15:42.98	
9	Jennifer Wenth	Austria	15:47.61	
10	Renata Pliś	Poland	15:48.58	
11	Karoline Bjerkeli Grøvdal	Norway	15:52.78	
12	Kristiina Mäki	Czech Republic	15:57.13	
13	Maren Kock	Germany	16:04.60	
14	Paula González	Spain	16:24.58	
—N/a	Sonja Roman	Slovenia	DNF	
DQ	Yelena Korobkina	Russia	~~15:32.89~~	
DQ	Gamze Bulut	Turkey	~~15:44.73~~	
