= 2018 European Athletics Championships – Women's 10,000 metres =

Women's 10,000 metres at the 2018 European Athletics Championships
- Venue: Olympic Stadium
- Location: Berlin
- Dates: 8 August (final)
- Competitors: 26 from 15 nations
- Winning time: 31:43.29

Medalists
gold medal	Lonah Chemtai Salpeter	Israel
silver medal	Susan Krumins	Netherlands
bronze medal	Alina Reh	Germany

The women's 10,000 metres at the 2018 European Athletics Championships took place at the Olympic Stadium on 8 August.

Meraf Bahta who finished 3rd was later disqualified and Alina Reh was promoted to bronze medal.

== Records ==
Standing records prior to the 2018 European Athletics Championships
World record	Almaz Ayana (ETH)	29:17.45	Rio de Janeiro, Brazil	12 August 2016
European record	Paula Radcliffe (GBR)	30:01.09	Munich, Germany	6 August 2002
Championship record	Paula Radcliffe (GBR)	30:01.09	Munich, Germany	6 August 2002
World Leading	Pauline Kaveke Kamulu (KEN)	30:41.85	Fukagawa, Japan	11 July 2018
European Leading	Lonah Chemtai Salpeter (ISR)	31:33.03	London, Great Britain	19 May 2018

== Schedule ==
Date	Time	Round
8 August 2018	20:40	Final

== Results ==
=== Final ===
Place	Athlete	Nation	Time	Notes
1st place, gold medalist(s)	Lonah Chemtai Salpeter	Israel	31:43.29	
2nd place, silver medalist(s)	Susan Krumins	Netherlands	31:52.55	
3rd place, bronze medalist(s)	Alina Reh	Germany	32:28.48	
4	Yasemin Can	Turkey	32:34.34	
5	Alice Wright	Great Britain	32:36.45	
6	Charlotta Fougberg	Sweden	32:43.04	PB
7	Sviatlana Kudzelich	Belarus	32:46.34	
8	Maitane Melero	Spain	32:52.59	
9	Sara Catarina Ribeiro	Portugal	32:53.71	
10	Nuria Lugueros	Spain	32:55.30	
11	Roxana Bârcă	Romania	33:17.61	
12	Krisztina Papp	Hungary	33:20.27	
13	Natalie Tanner	Germany	33:22.21	
14	Jip Vastenburg	Netherlands	33:41.79	
15	Sophie Duarte	France	33:56.57	
16	Emma Mitchell	Ireland	34:08.61	
17	Yevheniya Prokofyeva	Ukraine	34:15.81	
	Yuliya Shmatenko	Ukraine	DNF	
	Katarzyna Rutkowska	Poland	DNF	
	Anna Gehring	Germany	DNF	
	Ancuța Bobocel	Romania	DNF	
	Sara Moreira	Portugal	DNF	
	Inês Monteiro	Portugal	DNF	
	Tania Carretero	Spain	DNF	
	Olena Serdyuk	Ukraine	DQ	
	Meraf Bahta	Sweden	DQ	~~32:19.34~~
