= Vanessa Mercera =

Dutch sprinter

Personal information
- Born: 1 September 2004 (age 21)

Sport
- Sport: Athletics
- Events: Sprint, Heptathlon
Medal record
Women's athletics
Representing Netherlands
European Championships
Gold medal – first place	2026 Birmingham	4 × 400 m relay

Vanessa Mercera (born 1 September 2004) is a Dutch sprinter and multi-event athlete.

== Biography ==
From Curacao, she is a student at Kansas State University in the United States. She had a seventh-place finish in pentathlon at the 2026 NCAA Division I Indoor Track and Field Championships. In May, Mercera set a school record with 55.39 seconds for a first-place finish in the 400 metres hurdles at the 2026 Big 12 Conference Championships. In June, she was a semi-finalist in the 400 m hurdles at the 2026 NCAA Outdoor Championships. In July, she placed third in the final of the 400 m hurdles at the Dutch Championships in Hengelo.

Mercera was selected to represent the Netherlands at the 2026 European Athletics Championships in Birmingham, running as part of the women's 4 × 400 metres team as they qualified for the final from the preliminary round, with the team going on to win the gold medal in the final.
