= Daan Kneppers =

Dutch hurdler

Personal information
- Born: 6 January 2003 (age 23)

Sport
- Sport: Athletics
- Event: Hurdles

Achievements and titles
- Personal bests: 400m: 46.35 (2026); 400mH: 49.95 (2026)
Medal record
Men's athletics
Representing Netherlands
European Championships
Bronze medal – third place	2026 Birmingham	4 × 400 m relay

Daan Kneppers (born 6 January 2003) is a Dutch sprinter and hurdler. He won the 2025 Dutch Athletics Championships over 400 metres hurdles.

== Biography ==
From Zoetermeer, he is a member of ARV Ilion. His sister Lies also competes as an athlete. Kneppers placed third over 400 metres at the 2024 Dutch Indoor Athletics Championships.

In July 2025, he represented the Netherlands at the 2025 European Athletics U23 Championships in Bergen, Norway. The following month, Kneppers won the Dutch Athletics Championships over 400 metres hurdles in Hengelo, winning in 51.41 seconds.

In March 2026, Kneppers was selected as part of the Dutch team for the 2026 World Athletics Indoor Championships in Toruń, Poland, on the 4 × 400 m relay teams. In May, he ran a personal best in the 400 m hurdles of 49.95 seconds in Brussels. In June, he ran a personal best 46.35 seconds for the flat 400 metres at the Gouden Spike in Leiden. In August 2026, he competed in the qualifying round of the men's 4 × 400 metres relay at the 2026 European Athletics Championships in Birmingham, England, with the team winning the bronze medal in the final.
