= 2018 European Athletics Championships – Women's 5000 metres =

Women's 5000 metres at the 2018 European Athletics Championships
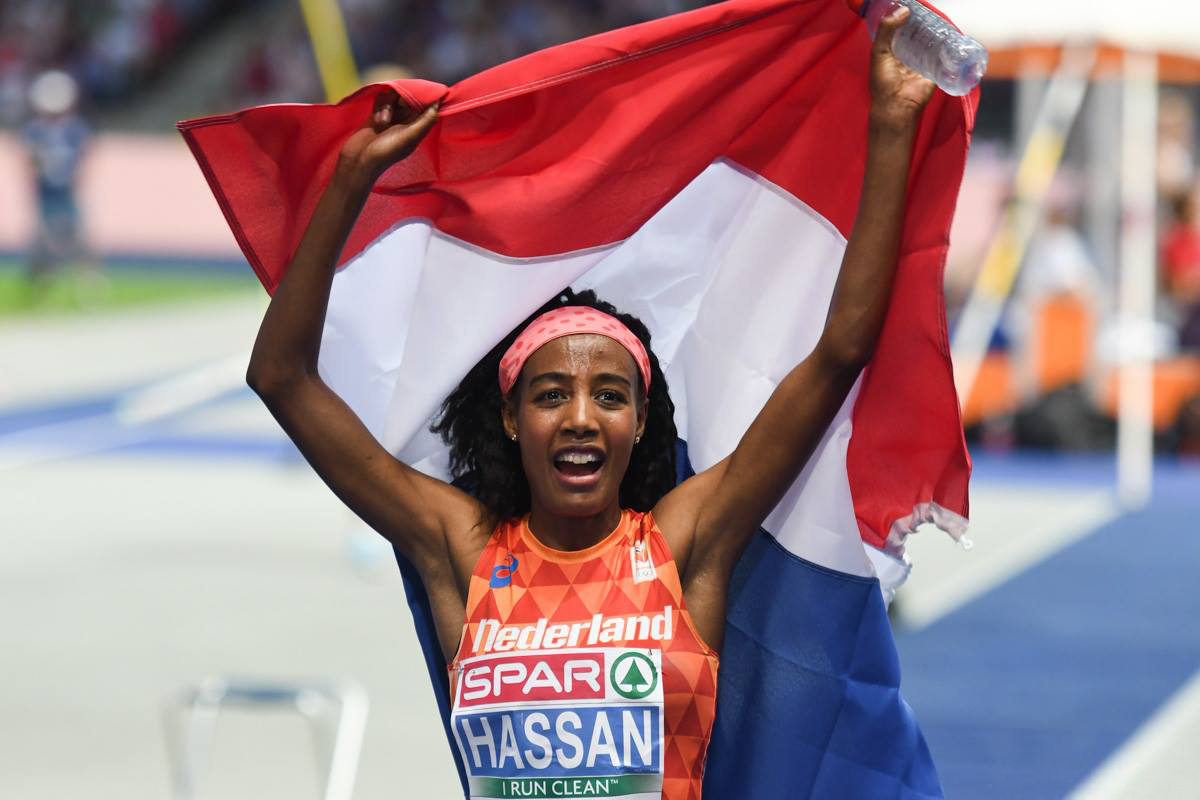
- Venue: Olympic Stadium
- Location: Berlin
- Dates: 12 August 2018
- Competitors: 19 from 11 nations
- Winning time: 14:46.12

Medalists
gold medal	Sifan Hassan	Netherlands
silver medal	Eilish McColgan	Great Britain
bronze medal	Yasemin Can	Turkey

The women's 5000 metres at the 2018 European Athletics Championships took place at the Olympic Stadium on 12 August.

== Records ==
Standing records prior to the 2018 European Athletics Championships
World record	Tirunesh Dibaba (ETH)	14:11.15	Oslo, Norway	6 June 2008
European record	Sifan Hassan (NED)	14:22.34	Rabat, Morocco	13 July 2018
Championship record	Elvan Abeylegesse (TUR)	14:54.44	Barcelona, Spain	1 August 2010
World Leading	Hellen Obiri (KEN)	14:21.75	Rabat, Morocco	13 July 2018
European Leading	Sifan Hassan (NED)	14:22.34	Rabat, Morocco	13 July 2018
Broken records during the 2018 European Athletics Championships
Championship record	Sifan Hassan (NED)	14:46.12	Berlin, Germany	12 August 2018

== Schedule ==
Date	Time	Round
12 August 2018	20:15	Final

All times are local times (UTC+2)

== Results ==
=== Final ===
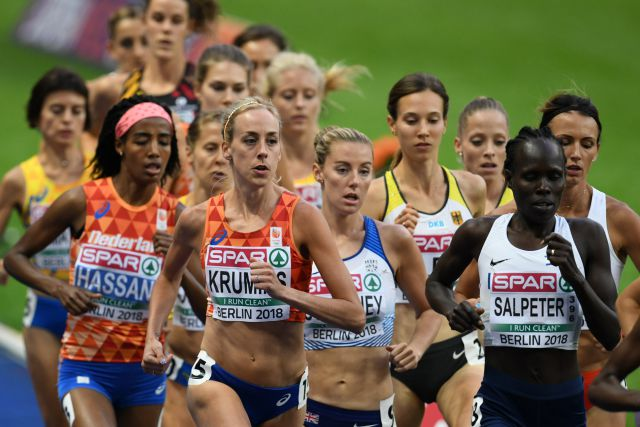
Athletes during the race

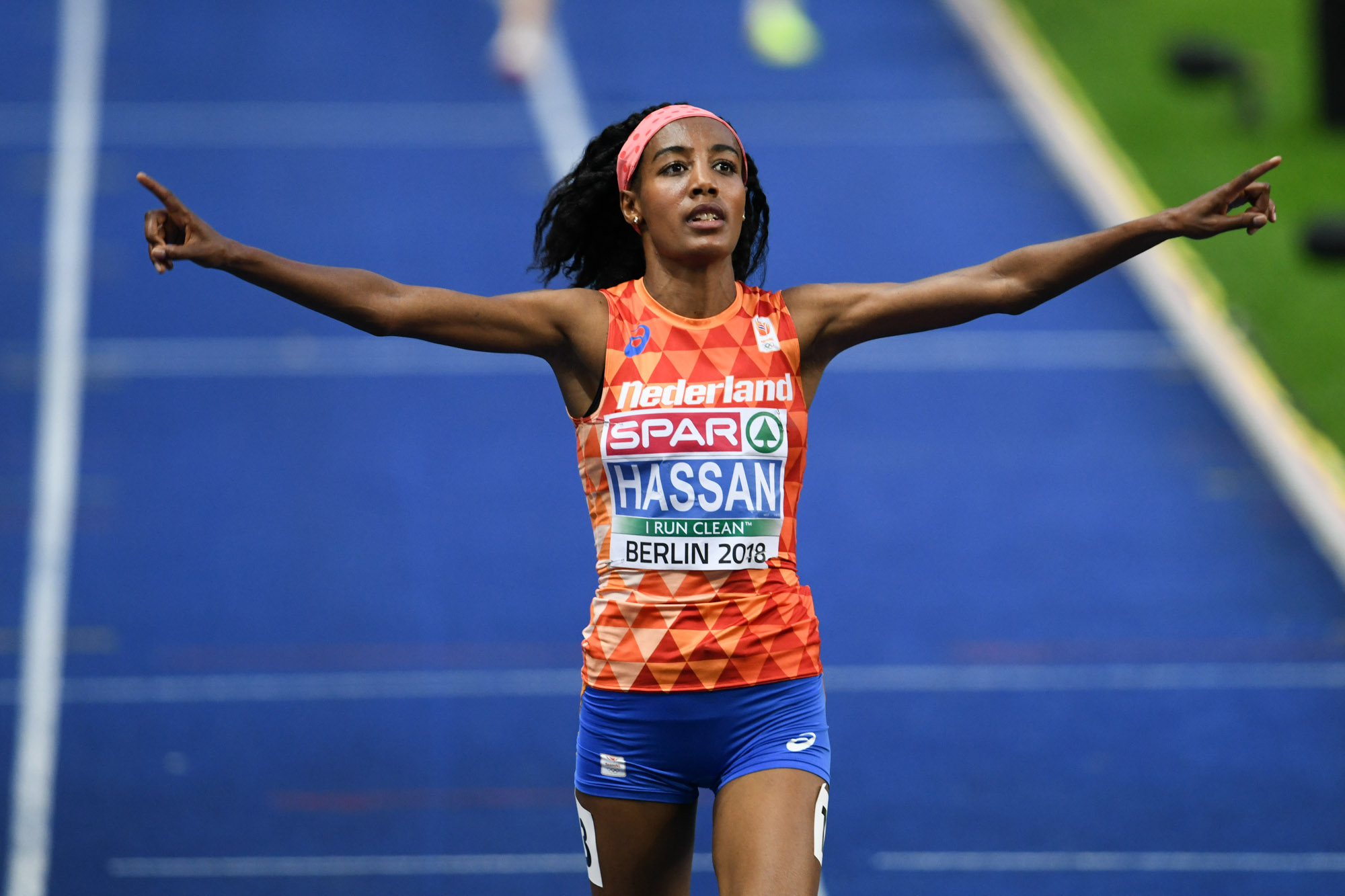
Sifan Hassan at the finish line

Rank	Name	Nationality	Time	Note
1st place, gold medalist(s)	Sifan Hassan	Netherlands	14:46.12	CR
2nd place, silver medalist(s)	Eilish McColgan	Great Britain	14:53.05	
3rd place, bronze medalist(s)	Yasemin Can	Turkey	14:57.63	SB
4	Konstanze Klosterhalfen	Germany	15:03.73	SB
5	Melissa Courtney	Great Britain	15:04.75	PB
6	Susan Krumins	Netherlands	15:09.65	SB
7	Ancuța Bobocel	Romania	15:16.13	PB
8	Maureen Koster	Netherlands	15:21.64	
9	Charlotta Fougberg	Sweden	15:24.36	
10	Stephanie Twell	Great Britain	15:41.10	
11	Katarzyna Rutkowska	Poland	15:41.52	
12	Paulina Kaczyńska	Poland	15:49.21	
13	Louise Carton	Belgium	15:53.27	
14	Denise Krebs	Germany	16:07.98	
15	Yuliya Shmatenko	Ukraine	16:41.37	
	Linn Nilsson	Sweden	DNF	
	Hanna Klein	Germany	DNF	
	Nada Pauer	Austria	DQ	163.5 (c)
	Lonah Chemtai Salpeter	Israel	DQ	163.5 (c)
