= Giovanni Codrington =

Dutch sprinter

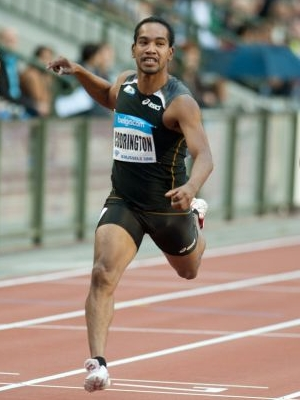

Personal information
- Full name: Giovanni Codrington
- Born: 17 July 1988 (age 37) Paramaribo, Suriname
- Height: 1.77 m (5 ft 9 1/2 in)
- Weight: 80 kg (180 lb)

Sport
- Country: Netherlands
- Sport: Athletics
- Event: Sprint

Achievements and titles
- Regional finals: 1st at the 2012 European Athletics Championships

Giovanni Codrington (born 17 July 1988) is a Dutch athlete, who competes in the sprint with a personal best time of 10.29 seconds at the 100 m and 21.42 seconds at the 200 m event.

Codrington won the gold medal at the 2012 European Athletics Championships in Helsinki at the 4 × 100 m relay.
