= Susan Krumins =

Dutch middle- and long-distance runner

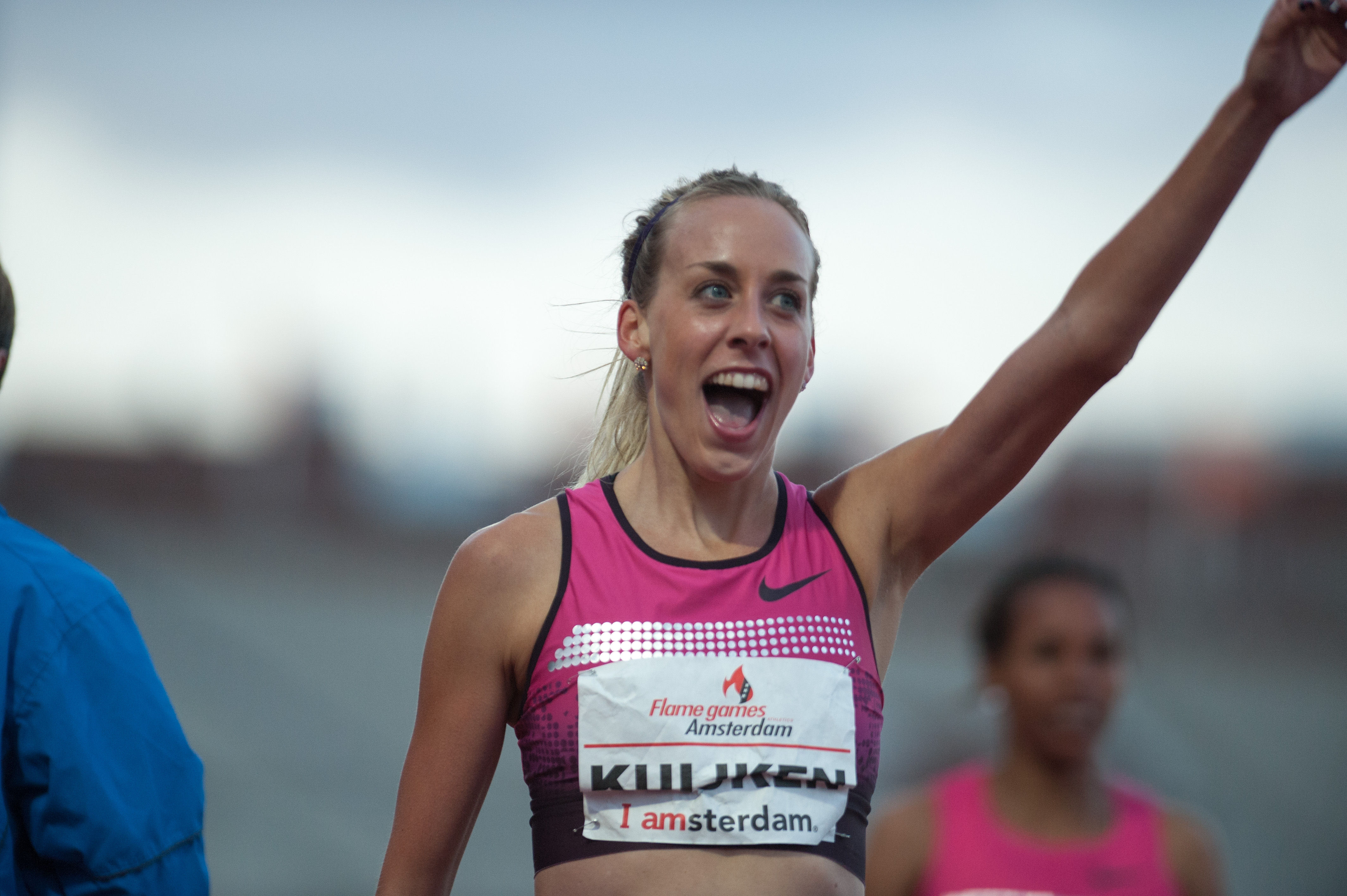
- Krumins at a Dutch race in 2013

Medal record

Women's athletics

Representing the Netherlands

European Athletics Championships
Silver medal – second place	2018 Berlin	10000 m
Bronze medal – third place	2014 Zurich	5000 m

Susan Krumins (née Kuijken; born 8 July 1986), is a Dutch middle‑ and long‑distance runner who represented Nike professionally for 12 years. She was remarkably consistent on the global stage; placing top‑eight at five consecutive global outdoor championships from 2013 to 2019 and earning medals at the European Championships in the off years.

== Early life and career ==
Born in Nijmegen, she made her international debut in cross country running, competing in the junior section of the 2002 European Cross Country Championships and finishing in 34th. She returned at the 2003 edition but managed only 69th on that attempt. Her first international medals came at the 2003 European Youth Olympic Festival, where she was the gold medallist over 3000 metres and bronze medallist at 1500 metres. Her first global events came the year after: she ranked 71st in the junior race at the 2004 IAAF World Cross Country Championships, but did not finish in the 3000 m at the 2004 World Junior Championships in Athletics. She performed better at continental level, coming 39th at the 2004 European Cross Country Championships.

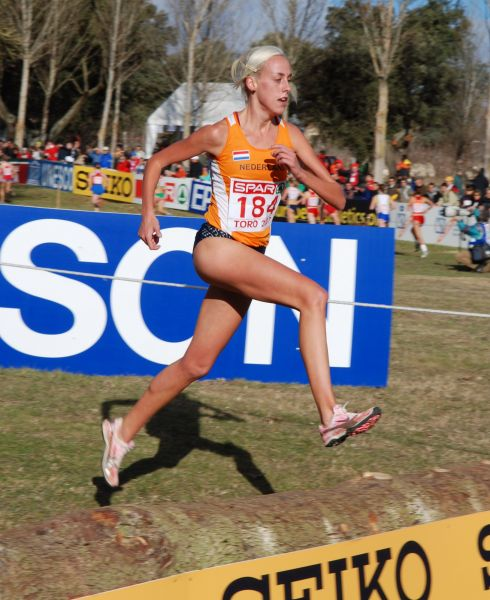
Kuijken at the 2007 European Cross Country Championships

Kuijken set a series of personal bests on the track in 2005: 2:06.25 minutes for the 800 metres, 4:19.72 minutes for the 1500 m (for seventh at the 2005 European Cup event), 9:28.45 minutes for the 3000 m (part of a silver medal win at the 2005 European Athletics Junior Championships) and 10:42.93 minutes for the 3000 metres steeplechase. On grass, she was a junior bronze medallist at the 2005 European Cross Country Championships and placed 58th at the junior race at the 2005 IAAF World Cross Country Championships.

== Collegiate athletics ==
At the end of 2005 she started attending Florida State University, doing a major in psychology, and began competing with the Florida State Seminoles athletic team. She was the 3000 m runner-up at the Atlantic Coast Conference championship and placed 27th at the NCAA Women's Division I Cross Country Championship. In her sole international outing that year, she came 16th in the under-23 race at the 2006 European Cross Country Championships. In 2007 a focus on the 1500 m distance brought results as she greatly improved her best to 4:11.34 minutes – a time which brought her second place at the NCAA Outdoor Championships. She ranked third at that year's NCAA Cross Country meet. In European competition she was fourth in the 1500 m at the 2007 European Athletics U23 Championships, but failed to finish in the age category race at the 2007 European Cross Country Championships.

She reached to top of the American collegiate scene in the indoor 2008 season. After winning the mile run at the Atlantic Coast Conference (ACC) indoor meet, she claimed the 3000 m title at the NCAA Indoor Championships in a conference record time of 8:58.14 minutes. She failed to match this outdoors after suffering a mid-season injury, ending up eighth in the 1500 m at the NCAA Outdoors, but was in good form at the NCAA Cross Country Championships and was the runner-up. A gold medal came in the under-23 section at the 2008 European Cross Country Championships.

Her most successful collegiate season was in 2009. She started with a win at the ACC indoor championships and a runner-up finish at the NCAA Indoor Championships, then a win over 5000 metres came at the ACC outdoor championships. She secured the collegiate title in the 1500 m at the 2009 NCAA Outdoor Championships and placed third at the NCAA Cross Country Championships. Her performances led to Florida State University winning the team titles in ACC competition indoors, outdoors and in cross country.

== Professional running ==
A personal best of 4:05.86 minutes for the 1500 m brought her selection for the 2009 World Championships in Athletics, although she did not make it out of the heats stage. Kuijken began competing professionally in 2010, and made her European senior debut at the 2010 European Athletics Championships (running in the heats only). She missed most of the 2011 season, and on her return in 2012 her form was past her peak, with her season's best being 4:10.84 minutes.

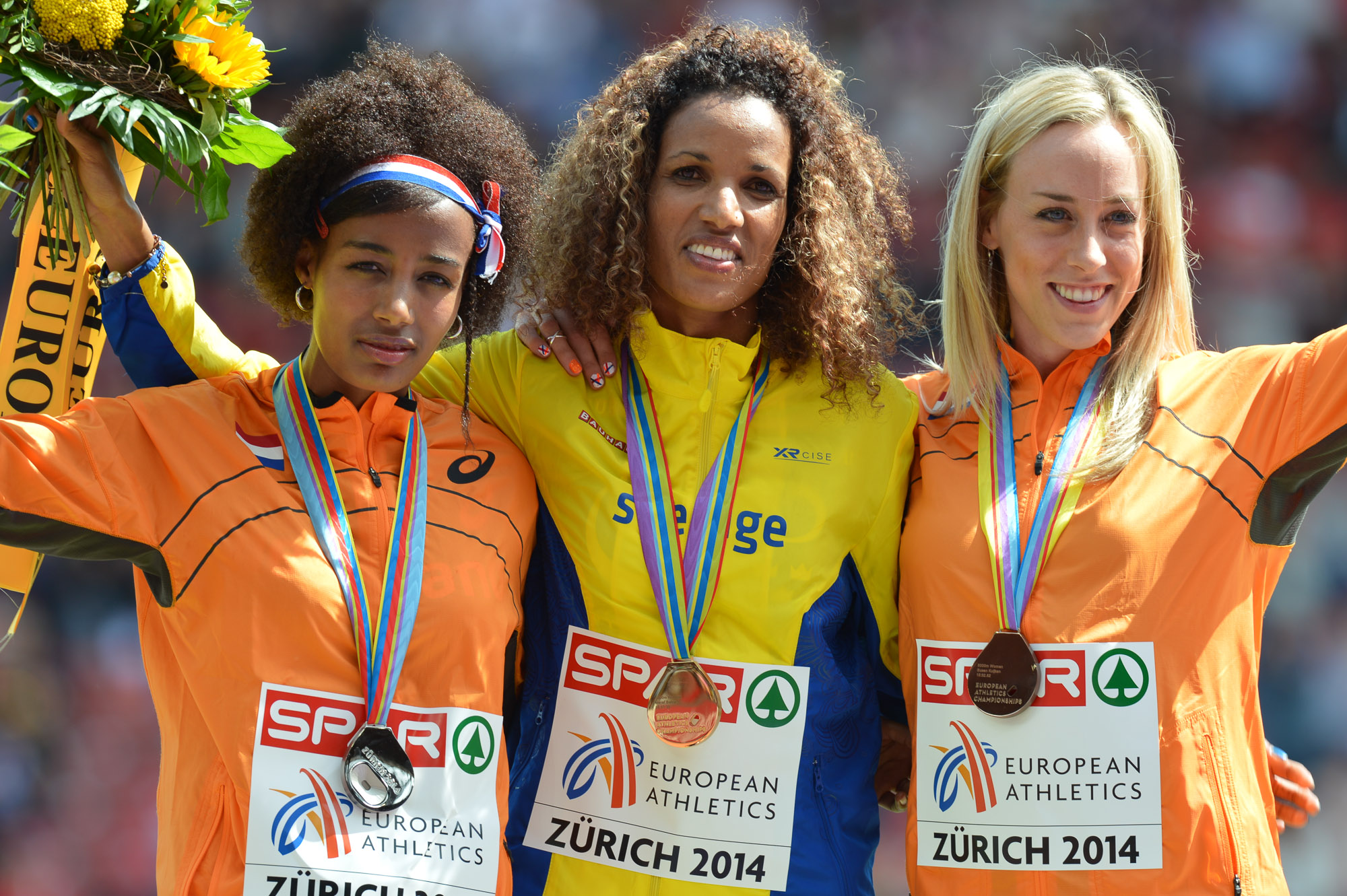
Kuijken (right) on the 5000 m podium for the 2014 European Athletics Championships

The 2013 season saw Kuijken hit new levels of performance. At the Golden Spike Ostrava she was the 1500 m runner-up in a best of 4:05.38 minutes. She set a Dutch record of 5:38.37 minutes for the 2000 metres distance. She won the 3000 m gold medal in the First League of the 2013 European Team Championships and ran a best of 8:39.65 minutes for the distance when placing fourth at the Rieti Meeting (which ranked her first among Europeans for the distance that year). A run of 15:04.36 minutes at the Bislett Games made her the top European that season and she went on to finish eighth in the final of that event at the 2013 World Championships in Athletics – Europe's best performer.

At the start of 2014 she set an early world-leading time of 4:07.21 minutes for the 1500 m while winning at the Perth Track Classic. She won her first national title later that year at that distance. She was selected to run the 5000 m at the 2014 European Athletics Championships and came third behind compatriot Sifan Hassan and Meraf Bahta (both African-born). Her first global medal came at the end of the track season at the 2014 IAAF Continental Cup, where she represented Europe and was 3000 m bronze medallist behind Genzebe Dibaba and Meraf.

In 2015, Kuijken ran 31:54.32 to place 10th at 2015 World Championships in Athletics – Women's 10,000 metres and 15:08.00 to place 8th at 2015 World Championships in Athletics – Women's 5000 metres.

In 2016, Kuijken ran 31:32.43 to place 14th at Athletics at the 2016 Summer Olympics – Women's 10,000 metres.

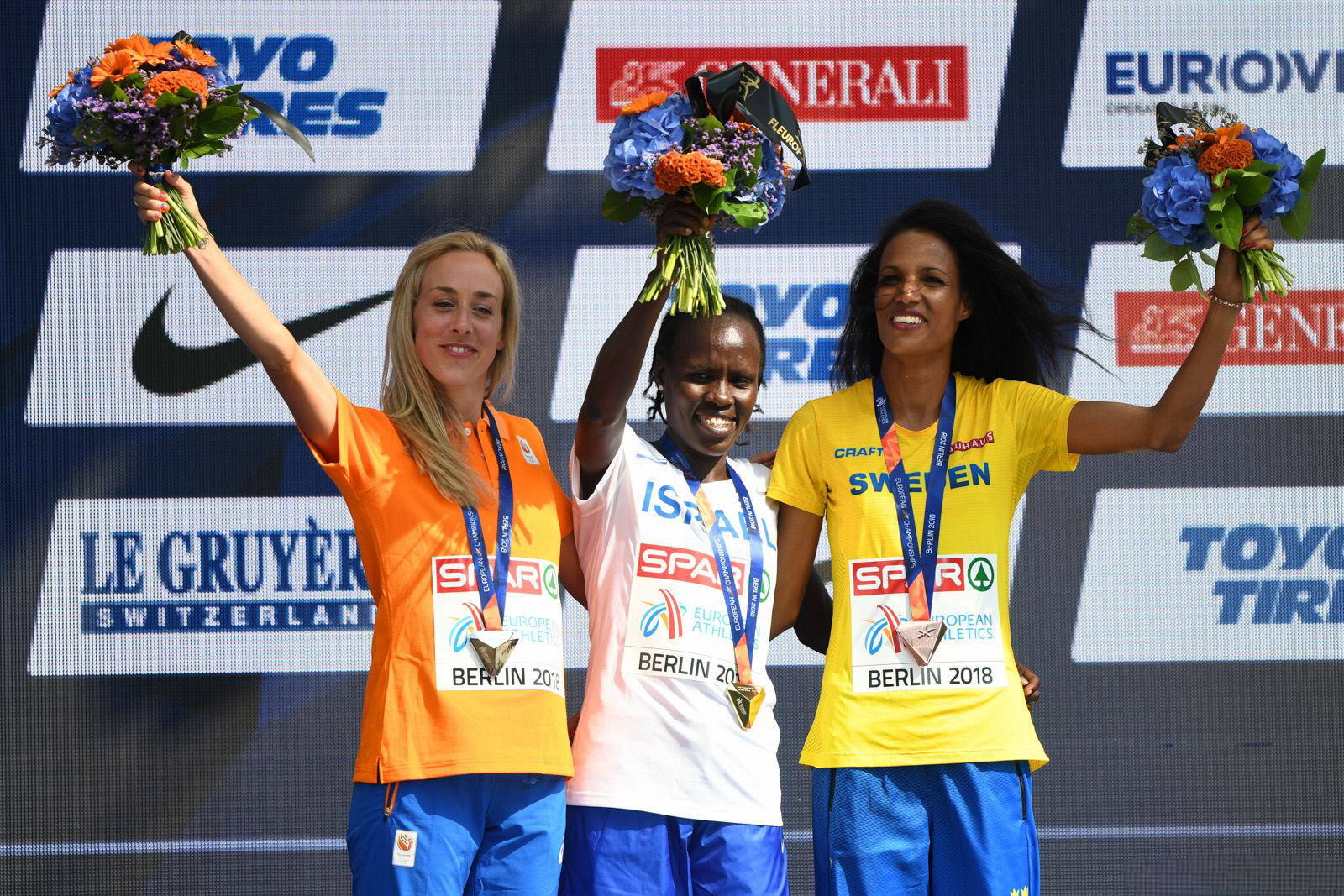
Krumins (left) with her 10,000 m silver medal at the 2018 European Athletics Championships

11 Feb 2017 - Schoorl 10k road 31:43 (1st)
27 Mar - Venloop HM (debut) 70:51 (4th)
21 May - Vienna 5k road 15:40 (2nd)
2 Jun - Nijmegen 5k 15:21 (4th)
24 Jun - Euro Cup 3k 9:03 (4th)
22 Jul - Heusden 5k 14:53 (1st)
8 Aug - London WC Final 10k 31:20 (5th)
10 Aug - London WC Heat 5k 14:57 (4th)
13 Aug - London WC Final 5k 14:58 (8th)
20 Aug - Birmingham DL 3k 8:34 (7th)
27 Aug - Berlin CL 1500m 4:02 (3rd)
1 Sep - Brussels 2017 Diamond League Final 5k 14:51 (9th)

In 2017, Krumins raced 31:20.24 to place 5th at 2017 World Championships in Athletics – Women's 10,000 metres and 14:58.33 to place 8th at 2017 World Championships in Athletics – Women's 5000 metres.

On 8 August 2018, she won a silver medal behind Israeli Lonah Chemtai Salpeter in the 10,000 metres at the 2018 European Athletics Championships in Berlin.

== Personal bests ==
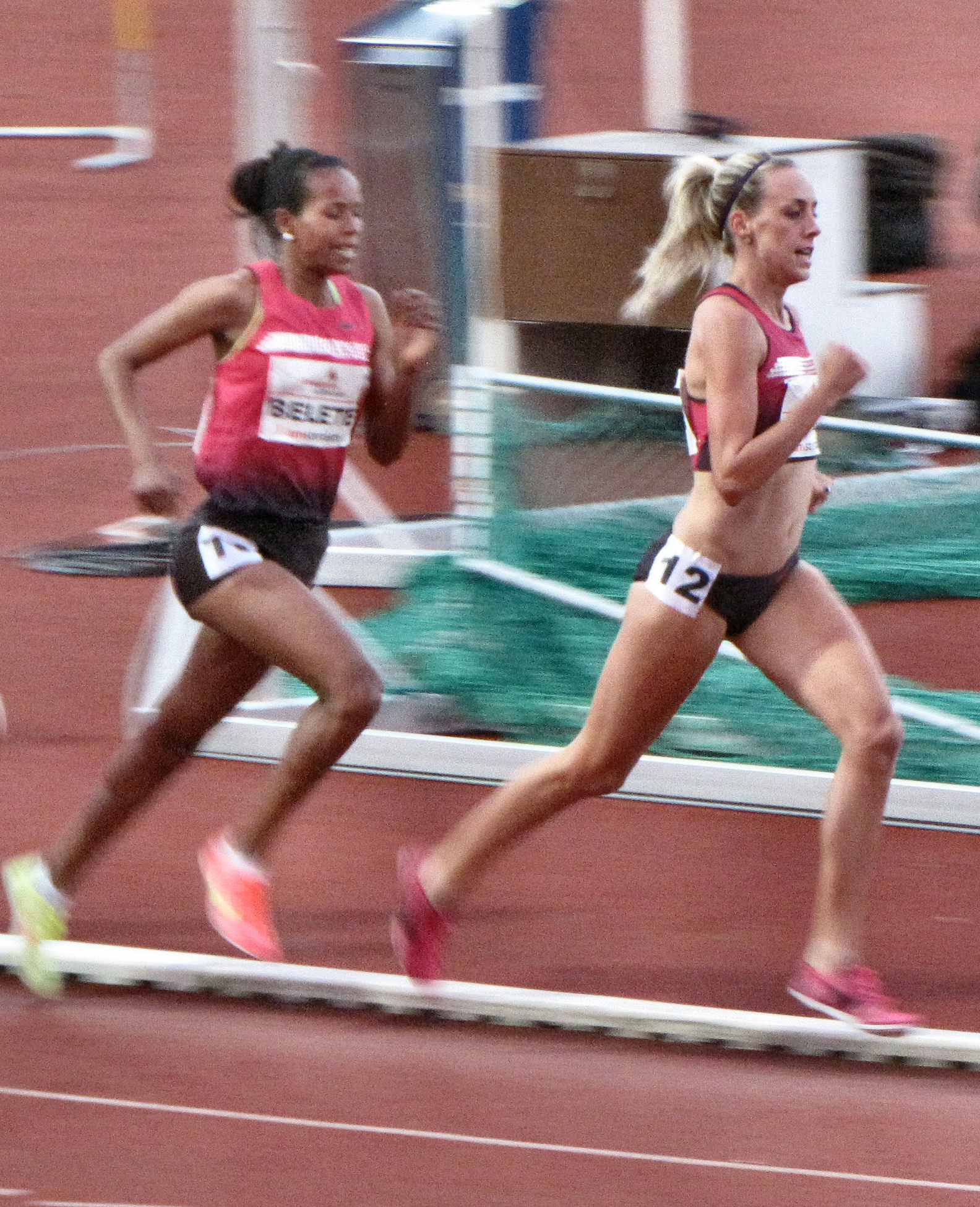
Krumins running in Amsterdam in 2013

- 800 metres – 2:02.24 min (2009)
- 1000 metres – 2:38.01 min (2014)
- 1500 metres – 4:02.25 min (2017)
- Mile run (indoor) – 4:34.11 min (2009)
- Mile run (road) – 4:18 min (2013)
- 2000 metres – 5:38.37 min (2013)
- 3000 metres – 8:34.31 min (2017)
- 3000 metres indoor – 8:56.27 min (2009)
- Two miles – 9:23.52 min (2014)
- 5000 metres – 14:51.25 min (2017)
- 10,000 metres – 31:05.40 min (2019)
- 3000 metres steeplechase – 10:42.93 min (2005)

== National titles ==
- Dutch Athletics Championships
  - 1500 metres: 2014

== International competitions ==
Year	Competition	Venue	Position	Event	Notes
Representing the Netherlands
2002	European Cross Country Championships	Medulin, Croatia	34th	Junior race (3.73 km)	13:10
2003	European Youth Olympic Festival	Valkenswaard, Netherlands	3rd	1500 metres	4:30.70
2003	European Youth Olympic Festival	Valkenswaard, Netherlands	1st	3000 metres	9:47.07
2003	European Cross Country Championships	Edinburgh, United Kingdom	69th	Junior race (4.52 km)	18:33
2004	World Cross Country Championships	Brussels, Belgium	71st	Junior race (6 km)	23:16
2004	World Junior Championships	Grosseto, Italy	—	3000 metres	DNF
2004	European Cross Country Championships	Heringsdorf, Germany	39th	Junior race (3.64 km)	12.24
2005	World Cross Country Championships	Saint-Galmier, France	58th	Junior race (6.153 km)	23:21
2005	European Junior Championships	Kaunas, Lithuania	2nd	3000 metres	9:28.45
2005	European Cross Country Championships	Tilburg, Netherlands	3rd	Junior race (4.83 km)	15.33
2006	European Cross Country Championships	San Giorgio su Legnano, Italy	16th	Under-23 race (5.975 km)	19:45
2007	European U23 Championships	Debrecen, Hungary	4th	1500 metres	4:17.90
2007	European Cross Country Championships	Toro, Spain	—	Under-23 race (6.7 km)	DNF
2008	European Cross Country Championships	Brussels, Belgium	1st	Under-23 race (6 km)	21:02
2009	World Championships	Berlin, Germany	36th (heats)	1500 metres	4:18.10
2010	European Championships	Barcelona, Spain	19th (h)	1500 metres	4:11.03
2013	European Team Championships 1st League	Dublin, Ireland	1st	3000 metres	9:07.04
2013	World Championships	Moscow, Russia	8th	5000 metres	15:14.70
2014	European Championships	Zurich, Switzerland	3rd	5000 metres	15:32.82
2014	IAAF Continental Cup	Marrakesh, Morocco	3rd	3000 metres	9:01.41
2015	World Championships	Beijing, China	8th	5000 metres	15:08.00
2015	World Championships	Beijing, China	10th	10,000 metres	31:54.32
2016	European Championships	Amsterdam, Netherlands	4th	5000 metres	15:23.87
2016	Olympic Games	Rio de Janeiro, Brazil	8th	5000 metres	15:00.69
2016	Olympic Games	Rio de Janeiro, Brazil	14th	10,000 metres	31:32.43
2017	World Championships	London, United Kingdom	8th	5000 metres	14:58.33
2017	World Championships	London, United Kingdom	5th	10,000 metres	31:20.24
2018	European Championships	Berlin, Germany	6th	5000 m	15:09.65
2018	European Championships	Berlin, Germany	2nd	10,000 m	31:52.55
2019	World Championships	Doha, Qatar	7th	10,000 m	31:05.40
2021	Olympic Games	Tokyo, Japan	–	10,000 m	DNF

== See also ==
- List of European Athletics Championships medalists (women)
- Netherlands at the European Athletics Championships
