= Maureen Koster =

Dutch middle-distance runner

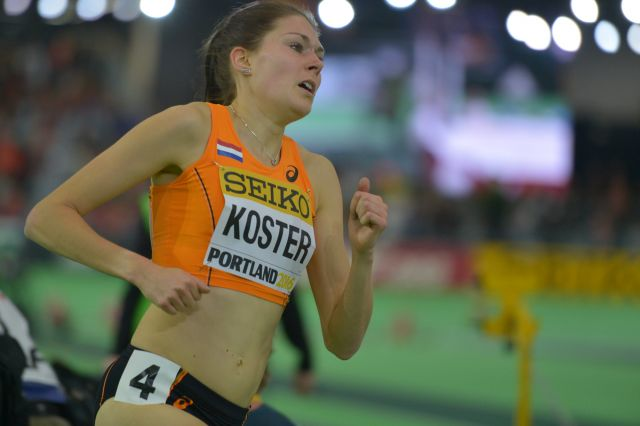
- Maureen Koster in 2016

Personal information
- Born: 3 July 1992 (age 34) Gouda, Netherlands
- Height: 1.76 m (5 ft 9 in)
- Weight: 57 kg (126 lb)

Sport
- Sport: Athletics
- Events: 1500 m, 3000 m, 5000 m
- Club: Phanos
- Coached by: Bert Koster, Grete Koens
Medal record
European Championships
Silver medal – second place	2026 Birmingham	10,000 m
European Indoor Championships
Silver medal – second place	2015 Prague	3000 m

Maureen Koster (pronounced [mʌuˈreːŋ ˈkɔstər]; born 3 July 1992) is a Dutch middle-distance runner who competes in track and cross country running events. She won the bronze medal in the 3000 metres at the 2015 European Athletics Indoor Championships in Prague, which later became a silver medal after Yelena Korobkina was disqualified for doping.

She was born in Gouda. She represented her country at the 2010 World Junior Championships in Athletics and the 2013 World Championships in Athletics. She ran in the under-23 section at the 2013 and 2014 European Cross Country Championships, winning a team bronze on the first attempt and coming fifth individually in the latter edition. She also ran in 1500 m at the 2014 European Athletics Championships, but failed to make the final.

She won the silver medal at 10.000 meters at the 2026 European Championship in Birmingham.

== Personal bests ==
Outdoor

- 800 metres – 2:02.15 (Ninove 2014)
- 1000 metres – 2:40.09 (Amsterdam 2014)
- 1500 metres – 3:59.79 (Monaco 2015)
- 5000 metres – 14:33.56 (Rome 2026)

Indoor

- 1500 metres – 4:10.68 (Karlsruhe 2016)
- 3000 metres – 8:33.47 (Liévin 2025)

== Competition record ==
Achievements in international competitions representing the Netherlands
Year	Competition	Location	Position	Event	Time
2009	European Youth Olympic Festival	Trabzon, Turkey	9th	1500 m	4:30.45
2010	World Junior Championships	Moncton, Canada	21st (h)	1500 m	4:22.08
2011	European Junior Championships	Tallinn, Estonia	–	1500 m	DNF
2013	European U23 Championships	Tampere, Finland	4th (h)	1500 m	4:15.00^{1}
2013	World Championships	Moscow, Russia	17th (sf)	1500 m	4:08.15
2014	European Championships	Zürich, Switzerland	17th (h)	1500 m	4:15.11
2015	European Indoor Championships	Prague, Czech Republic	2nd	3000 m	8:51.64
2015	World Championships	Beijing, China	9th (sf)	1500 m	4:10.95
2015	World Championships	Beijing, China	–	5000 m	DNF
2016	World Indoor Championships	Portland, Oregon United States	4th	3000 m	8:56.44
2016	Olympic Games	Rio de Janeiro, Brazil	32nd (h)	1500 m	4:13.15
2017	European Indoor Championships	Belgrade, Serbia	4th	3000 m	8:48.99
2018	European Championships	Berlin, Germany	8th	5000 m	15:21.64
2019	European Indoor Championships	Glasgow, United Kingdom	6th	3000 m	8:56.22
2019	World Championships	Doha, Qatar	–	5000 m	DNF
2021	European Indoor Championships	Toruń, Poland	8th (h)	3000 m	8:56.91^{1}
2022	World Championships	Eugene, Oregon, United States	21st (h)	5000 m	15:18.17
2022	European Championships	Munich, Germany	4th	5000 m	15:03.29
2023	European Indoor Championships	Istanbul, Turkey	6th	3000 m	8:47.17
2023	World Championships	Budapest, Hungary	12th	5000 m	15:00.78
2024	European Championships	Rome, Italy	4th	5000 m	14:44.46
2024	Olympic Games	Paris, France	19th (h)	5000 m	15:03.66
2025	World Championships	Tokyo, Japan	14th	5000 m	15:07.58
2026	European Championships	Birmingham, United Kingdom	6th	5000 m	15:41.51
2026	European Championships	Birmingham, United Kingdom	2nd	10,000 m	31:45.76
2026	World Ultimate Championship	Budapest, Hungary	8th	5000 m	14:38.78

^{1}Did not finish in the final
