= Athletics at the 2025 Summer World University Games – Men's 4 × 400 metres relay =

Men's 4 × 400 metres relay at the 2025 Summer World University Games
- Venue: Lohrheidestadion
- Location: Bochum, Germany
- Dates: 26 July (heats); 27 July (final)
- Competitors: 52 from 12 nations
- Winning time: 3:03.64

Medalists
gold medal	Daniel Sołtysiak; Marcin Karolewski; Wiktor Wróbel; Maksymilian Szwed; Patryk Grzegorzewicz	Poland
silver medal	Joseph Gant; Xavier Donaldson II; Ryan Matulonis; Jake Palermo; Jake Palermo	United States
bronze medal	Kubilay Ençü; İsmail Nezir; Berke Akçam; İlyas Çanakçı	Turkey

The men's 4 × 400 metres relay event at the 2025 Summer World University Games was held in Bochum, Germany, at Lohrheidestadion on 26 and 27 July.

== Records ==
Prior to the competition, the records were as follows:

Record	Athlete (nation)	Time (s)	Location	Date
Games record	United States (USA)	3:00.40	Fukuoka, Japan	3 September 1995

== Results ==
=== Heats ===
First 3 in each heat (Q) and the next 2 fastest qualified for the final.

==== Heat 1 ====
Place	Nation	Athletes	Time	Notes
1	Turkey	Kubilay Ençü, İlyas Çanakçı, Berke Akçam, İsmail Nezir	3:06.78	Q , SB
2	United States	Joseph Gant, Nayyir Newash-Campbell, Xavier Donaldson II, Ryan Matulonis	3:07.05	Q, SB
3	Hungary	Csanád Csahóczi, Zoltán Wahl, Balázs Plisz, Árpád Kovács	3:07.30	Q, SB
4	Colombia	Yan Sánchez, Andres Ruiz Vasco, Jhoan Julio Hoyos, Juan Wilches	3:17.99	q, SB
5	Saudi Arabia	Saad Bin Jawhar, Hamzah Alhuzum, Hussain Alsaba, Azzam Abu Bakr	3:18.02	SB
	Senegal	Omar Ndoye, Abdou Lahad Sylla, Abdoulaye Ndao, Abou Adama Sane	DQ	
	Australia	Colby Eddowes, Thomas Reynolds, Adam Goddard, Max Shervington	DQ	
	New Zealand		DNS	

==== Heat 2 ====
Place	Nation	Athletes	Time	Notes
1	Poland	Wiktor Wróbel, Marcin Karolewski, Patryk Grzegorzewicz, Maksymilian Szwed	3:05.78	Q , SB
2	India	Vishal Thennarasu Kayalvizhi, Aswin Lakshmanan, Jerome Jayaseelan Panimaya, Balakrishna Balakrishna	3:06.56	Q, SB
3	Canada	Keshawn Igbinosun, Ben Tilson, David Moulongou, Joshua Duckman	3:08.10	Q, SB
4	Belgium	Victor Morabito, Luca Laurent, Hadrien Piengeon, Mimoun Abdoul Wahab	3:11.13	q, SB
5	Ecuador	Santiago Llerena, Lucas Jiménez, Byron Preciado, Marcos Jiménez	3:22.84	SB
	Oman		DNS	
	Uganda		DNS	
	South Africa		DNS	

=== Final ===
Place	Nation	Athletes	Time	Notes
1st place, gold medalist(s)	Poland	Daniel Sołtysiak, Marcin Karolewski, Wiktor Wróbel, Maksymilian Szwed	3:03.64	SB
2nd place, silver medalist(s)	United States	Joseph Gant, Xavier Donaldson II, Ryan Matulonis, Jake Palermo	3:04.34	SB
3rd place, bronze medalist(s)	Turkey	Kubilay Ençü, İsmail Nezir, Berke Akçam, İlyas Çanakçı	3:04.40	SB
4	Hungary	Csanád Csahóczi, Zoltán Wahl, Árpád Kovács, Patrik Simon Enyingi	3:04.55	SB
5	India	Vishal Thennarasu Kayalvizhi, Aswin Lakshmanan, Jerome Jayaseelan Panimaya, Balakrishna Balakrishna	3:06.56	
6	Canada	Joshua Duckman, David Moulongou, Ben Tilson, Dawson Mann	3:09.15	
7	Belgium	Luca Laurent, Mimoun Abdoul Wahab, Hadrien Piengeon, Victor Morabito	3:13.58	
8	Colombia	Yan Sánchez, Andres Ruiz Vasco, Jhoan Julio Hoyos, Juan Wilches	3:19.33	
