= 2026 World Athletics Indoor Championships – Men's 4 × 400 metres relay =

Men's 4 × 400 metres relay at the 2026 World Athletics Indoor Championships
- Venue: Kujawsko-Pomorska Arena Toruń
- Location: Toruń, Poland
- Dates: 22 March
- Winning time: 3:01.52

Medalists
gold medal	Justin Robinson; Chris Robinson; Demarius Smith; Khaleb McRae; Elija Godwin; TJ Tomlyanovich	United States
silver medal	Jonathan Sacoor; Christian Iguacel; Julien Watrin; Robin Vanderbemden; Dylan Borlée	Belgium
bronze medal	Reheem Hayles; Delano Kennedy; Tyrice Taylor; Kimar Farquharson; Demar Francis	Jamaica

The men's 4 × 400 metres relay at the 2026 World Athletics Indoor Championships took place on the short track of the Kujawsko-Pomorska Arena Toruń in Toruń, Poland, on 22 March 2026. This was the 19th time the event was contested at the World Athletics Indoor Championships.

== Background ==
The men's 4 × 400 metres relay was contested 18 times before 2025, at every edition of the World Athletics Indoor Championships since 1991.

Records before the 2026 World Athletics Indoor Championships
Record	Team	Time (s)	Location	Date
World record	Houston	3:01.51	Clemson, United States	9 Feb 2019
Championship record	Poland	3:01.77	Birmingham, United Kingdom	4 March 2018
2026 World Lead	South Carolina	3:00.86	Clemson, United States	13 February 2026

== Qualification ==
For the men's 4 × 400 metres relay, there is no entry standard, and every Member Federation will be able to enter one team up to eight athletes in each event.

== Results ==
=== Round 1 ===
Qualification: First 2 in each heat (Q) and the next 2 fastest (q) advance to the Final.

Round 1 was held on 22 March, starting at 10:48 (UTC+1) in the morning.

Rank	Heat	Lane	Country	Athletes	Time	Notes
1	1	6	Netherlands	Eugene Omalla, Liemarvin Bonevacia, Max van der Lugt, Tony van Diepen	3:04.66	Q, SB
2	1	5	Portugal	Pedro Afonso, Ericsson Tavares, Omar Elkhatib, João Coelho	3:04.75	Q, NR
3	1	4	United States	Elija Godwin, Demarius Smith, Justin Robinson, TJ Tomlyanovich	3:04.85	q
4	2	5	Belgium	Robin Vanderbemden, Christian Iguacel, Dylan Borlée, Alexander Doom	3:05.25	Q, SB
5	2	4	Hungary	Árpád Kovács, Zoltán Wahl, Ernő Steigerwald, Csanád Csahóczi	3:05.67	Q, NR
6	2	5	Jamaica	Reheem Hayles, Tyrice Taylor, Kimar Farquharson, Demar Francis	3:05.68	q
7	1	6	Poland	Marcin Karolewski, Wiktor Wróbel, Remigiusz Zazula, Mateusz Rzeźniczak	3:06.30	SB
8	1	6	Venezuela	Axel Gomez, Ryan López, Javier Gómez, Kelvis Padrino	3:07.05	AR
9	2	6	Czech Republic	Martin Koreček, Milan Ščibráni, David Bix, Šimon Ceplý	3:07.53	SB

=== Final ===
The final was held on 22 March, starting at 20:26 (UTC+1) in the evening.

Rank	Lane	Country	Athletes	Time	Notes
1st place, gold medalist(s)	2	United States	Justin Robinson, Chris Robinson, Demarius Smith, Khaleb McRae	3:01.52	CR
2nd place, silver medalist(s)	6	Belgium	Jonathan Sacoor, Christian Iguacel, Julien Watrin, Robin Vanderbemden	3:03.29	SB
3rd place, bronze medalist(s)	1	Jamaica	Reheem Hayles, Delano Kennedy, Tyrice Taylor, Kimar Farquharson	3:05.99	
4	5	Netherlands	Eugene Omalla, Keenan Blake, Liemarvin Bonevacia, Tony van Diepen	3:06.05	
5	4	Portugal	Pedro Afonso, Ericsson Tavares, Omar Elkhatib, João Coelho	3:08.34	
6	3	Hungary	Árpád Kovács, Zoltán Wahl, Ernő Steigerwald, Csanád Csahóczi	3:09.51	
