= List of Hungarian records in athletics =

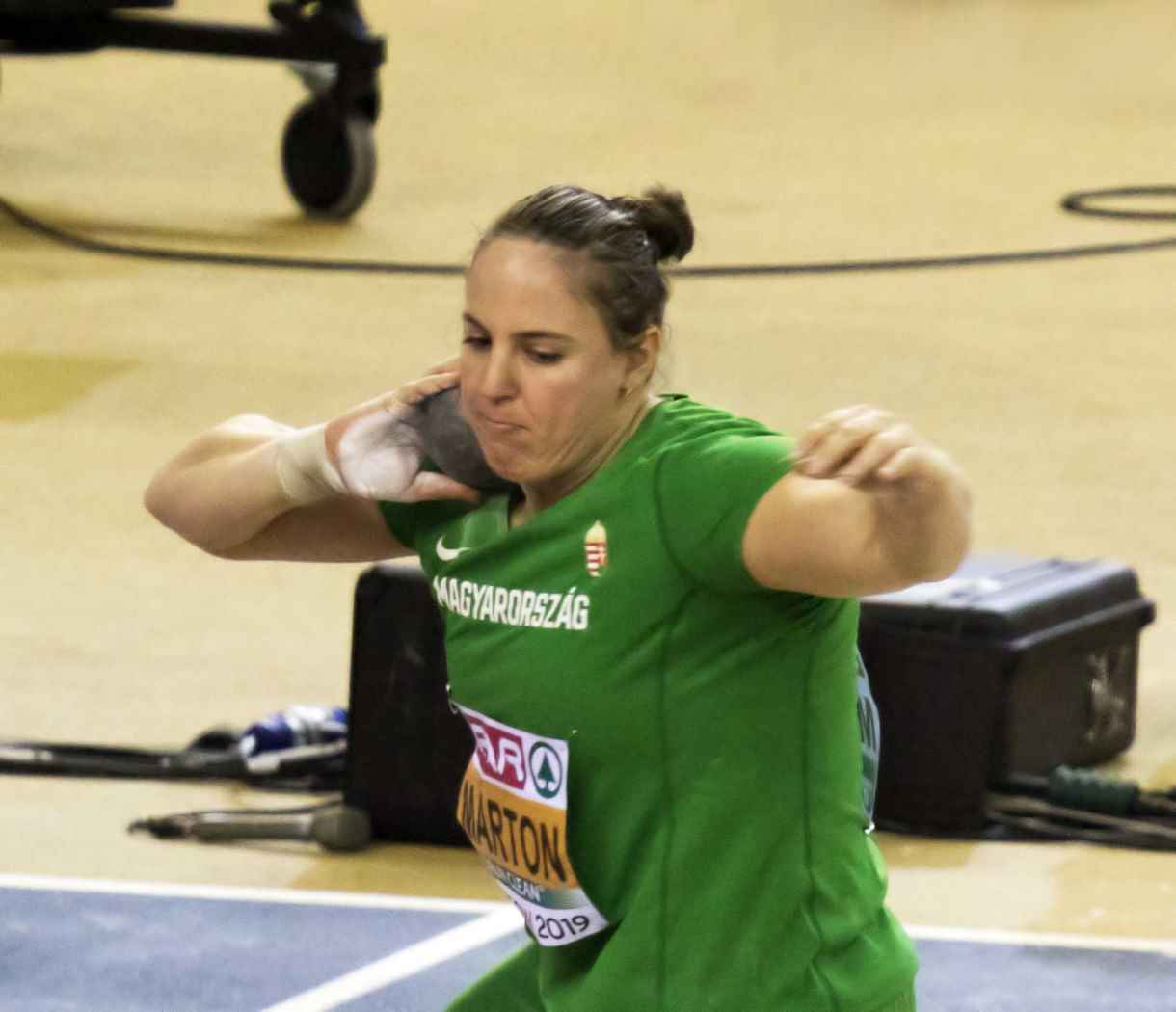
Anita Marton, Glasgow 2019

The following are the national records in athletics in Hungary maintained by Hungary's national athletics federation: Magyar Atlétikai Szövetség (MASZ).

== Outdoor ==
Key to tables: Awaiting ratification Record not kept by MASZ Not ratified or later rescined by MASZ

=== Men ===
Event	Record	Athlete	Date	Meet	Place	Ref.
100 m	10.08 (+1.0 m/s)	Roland Németh	9 June 1999		Budapest, Hungary	
150 m	15.27	Gábor Dobos	3 September 1999		Budapest, Hungary	
200 m	20.11 (+0.7 m/s)	Attila Kovács	21 August 1987		Miskolc, Hungary	
300 m	32.46	Tamás Molnár	26 July 1992		Nyíregyháza, Hungary	
400 m	44.55	Attila Molnár	14 September 2025	World Championships	Tokyo, Japan	
400 m	44.47	Attila Molnár	10 July 2026	Herculis	Fontvieille, Monaco	
600 m	1:16.33	Balázs Korányi	29 May 1999		Florø, Norway	
600 m	1:16.0 h	András Paróczai	30 May 1979		Budapest, Hungary	
800 m	1:45.37	Tamás Kazi	8 September 2013	Rieti Meeting	Rieti, Italy	
1000 m	2:17.19	Tamás Kazi	2 July 2018	Gyulai István Memorial	Székesfehérvár, Hungary	
1500 m	3:34.79	Ferenc Kovács	15 June 2025	Portland Track Festival	Portland, United States	
Mile	3:55.13	István Knipl	29 August 1984		Koblenz, West Germany	
Mile (road)	4:04.98	István Szögi	19 September 2026	World Road Running Championships	Copenhagen, Denmark	
Mile (road)	4:06.0 h	István Szögi	12 September 2026	Lët'z mile Luxembourg City	Luxembourg City, Luxembourg	
2000 m	5:01.9 h	László Kispál	17 May 1978		Budapest, Hungary	
3000 m	7:46.27	István Palkovits	12 August 2025	Gyulai István Memorial	Budapest, Hungary	
5000 m	13:26.96	Balázs Csillag	20 July 2002	KBC Night of Athletics	Heusden-Zolder, Belgium	
5 km (road)	14:32	Bence Acsádi	18 April 2026	Vienna City Marathon Vienna 5K	Vienna, Austria	
10,000 m	28:01.88	Zoltán Káldy	6 July 1991	Bislett Games	Oslo, Norway	
10 km (road)	28:34.7	László Tóth	10 October 2010		Uherské Hradiště, Czech Republic	
15,000 m (track)	44:27.8	István Kerékjártó	15 April 1978		Budapest, Hungary	
15 km (road)	44:56	Ádám Lomb	16 November 2025		Nijmegen, Netherlands	
20,000 m (track)	59:19.0	András Fancsali	15 April 1978		Budapest, Hungary	
20 km (road)	59:51	György Markó	7 March 1992	20 van Alphen	Alphen aan den Rijn, Netherlands	
One hour	20240 m	András Fancsali	16 April 1978		Budapest, Hungary	
Half marathon	1:02:22	Zoltán Kadlót	20 April 1996		Belgrade, Serbia	
25,000 m (track)	1:16:09.0	Gyula Borka	13 June 1992		La Flèche, France	
25 km	1:18:12+	Levente Szemerei	29 September 2024	Warsaw Marathon	Warsaw, Poland	
30,000 m (track)	1:32:16	János Szekeres	21 August 1982		Budapest, Hungary	
30 km	1:33:38+	Levente Szemerei	29 September 2024	Warsaw Marathon	Warsaw, Poland	
Marathon	2:10:43	Levente Szemerei	29 September 2024	Warsaw Marathon	Warsaw, Poland	
100 km	6:31:35	János Bogár	11 April 1999		Encs, Hungary	
24 hours (road)	279.780 km	Támas Bódis	18–19 October 2025	IAU 24 Hour World Championship	Albi, France	
110 m hurdles	13.15 (+0.3 m/s)	Balázs Baji	4 July 2017	Gyulai István Memorial	Székesfehérvár, Hungary	
400 m hurdles	48.45	Dusán Kovács	3 August 1997	World Championships	Athens, Greece	
3000 m steeplechase	8:17.97	Gábor Markó	21 July 1984		Potsdam, East Germany	
High jump	2.28 m	László Boros	6 July 2005		Debrecen, Hungary	
Pole vault	5.92 m	István Bagyula	5 July 1991	Gugl Games	Linz, Austria	
Long jump	8.30 m	László Szalma	7 July 1985		Budapest, Hungary	
Triple jump	17.24 m	Zsolt Czingler	31 May 1998		Tivoli, Italy	
Shot put	20.56 m (Note: Indoor mark ratified as absolute record)	Szilárd Kiss	26 July 2002	Hungarian Championships	Debrecen, Hungary	
Shot put	20.78 m (Note: not ratified due to unofficial competition)	Lajos Kürthy	4 October 2008		Mohács, Hungary	
Discus throw	71.70 m	Róbert Fazekas	14 July 2002	MAL Cup	Szombathely, Hungary	
Hammer throw	84.19 m	Adrián Annus	10 August 2003	MAL Cup	Szombathely, Hungary	
Hammer throw	84.25 m	Bence Halász	11 August 2026	European Championships	Birmingham, United Kingdom	
Javelin throw	84.98 m	György Herczeg	26 July 2023	Austrian Open	Eisenstadt, Austria	
Javelin throw	96.72 m (Old design)	Ferenc Paragi	23 April 1980		Tata, Hungary	
Decathlon	8554 pts	Attila Zsivoczky	3–4 June 2000	Hypo-Meeting	Götzis, Austria	
Decathlon	100m (wind) / Long jump (wind) / Shot put / High jump / 400m / 110m H (wind) / Discus / Pole vault / Javelin / 1500m; 10.64w / 7.24 m / 15.72 m / 2.18 m / 48.13 / 14.87 (−0.9 m/s) / 45.64 m / 4.65 m / 63.57 m / 4:23.13					
5000 m walk (track)	19:32.59	Máté Helebrandt	8 July 2023	Hungarian Championships	Budapest, Hungary	
10,000 m walk (track)	39:56.02	Máté Helebrandt	19 June 2016		Budapest, Hungary	
10 km walk (road)	40:00	Sándor Urbanik	24 July 1985		Helsinki, Finland	
Hour walk	14186	Sándor Urbanik	9 June 1990		Budapest, Hungary	
15 km walk (road)	1:03:12	Sándor Urbanik	9 June 1990		Budapest, Hungary	
20,000 m walk (track)	1:23:18.0	Gyula Dudás	29 May 1993		Budapest, Hungary	
20 km walk (road)	1:20:41	Sándor Urbanik	19 April 1997	World Race Walking Cup	Poděbrady, Czech Republic	
Half marathon walk	1:33:49	Norbert Tóth	25 October 2025	Lusatian Race Walking	Zittau, Germany	
Half marathon walk	1:25:44	Bence Venyercsán	29 March 2026	Békéscsabai Gyalogló Gála	Békéscsaba, Hungary	
Two hours walk	26535 m	Imre Stankovics	24 April 1977		Budapest, Hungary	
30,000 m walk (track)	2:17:22.8	Imre Stankovics	24 April 1977		Budapest, Hungary	
30 km walk (road)	2:12:31	Sándor Urbanik	1 May 1994		Békéscsaba, Hungary	
35 km walk (road)	2:32:30	Sándor Urbanik	6 February 1999		Békéscsaba, Hungary	
Marathon walk (road)	3:01:18	Bence Venyercsán	15 August 2026	European Championships	Birmingham, United Kingdom	
50,000 m walk (track)	3:55:37	Zoltán Czukor	11 August 2001		Budapest, Hungary	
50 km walk (road)	3:43:56	Máté Helebrandt	13 August 2017	World Championships	London, United Kingdom	
100 km walk (road)	8:58:47	Zoltán Czukor	27 October 2002		Scanzorosciate, Italy	
4 × 100 m relay	38.67	Hungary; László Karaffa; István Nagy; István Tatár; Attila Kovács	11 August 1986		Budapest, Hungary	
4 × 200 m relay	1:21.73	Hungary; Attila Kovács; László Babály; István Tatár; István Nagy	9 July 1982		Paris, France	
4 × 400 m relay	3:01.46	Hungary; Patrik Simon Enyingi; Zoltán Wahl; Csanad Csahóczi; Attila Molnár	15 August 2025	Kamila Skolimowska Memorial	Chorzów, Poland	
4 × 400 m relay	2:59.68	Hungary; Patrik Simon Enyingi; Balázs Plisz; Árpád Kovács; Attila Molnár	16 August 2026	European Championships	Birmingham, United Kingdom	
4 × 800 m relay	7:20.6 h	Ferencvárosi TC; János Hrenek; Imre Ötvös; Imre Deák Nagy; Béla Horváth	29 May 1977	Hungarian Championships	Budapest, Hungary	
4 × 1500 m relay	15:09.3 h	Tatabányai Bányász SC; Gábor Molnár; János Liczul; István Szalai; László Zöld	25 September 1982	Hungarian Championships	Budapest, Hungary	

=== Women ===
Event	Record	Athlete	Date	Meet	Place	Ref.
100 m	11.06 (±0.0 m/s)	Boglárka Takács	27 June 2025	European Team Championships	Madrid, Spain	
200 m	22.65 (−0.3 m/s)	Boglárka Takács	29 June 2025	European Team Championships	Madrid, Spain	
300 m	37.43 A	Barbara Petráhn	3 May 2003		Mexico City, Mexico	
400 m	51.50	Ilona Pál	11 August 1980		Budapest, Hungary	
400 m	51.50 X (Note: Not ratified due to missing doping control.)	Barbara Petráhn	12 May 2006		Xalapa, Mexico	
800 m	1:59.46	Judit Varga	12 June 2003	Golden Spike Ostrava	Ostrava, Czech Republic	
1000 m	2:36.6	Katalin Szalai	11 July 1984		Budapest, Hungary	
1500 m	4:01.26	Judit Varga	16 August 2002	Weltklasse Zürich	Zurich, Switzerland	
Mile	4:28.42	Judit Varga	7 August 1999		Hechtel-Eksel, Belgium	
2000 m	5:49.73	Zita Ágoston	23 June 1991		Berlin, Germany	
3000 m	8:32.70	Katalin Szentgyörgyi	6 July 2001	Meeting Areva	Saint-Denis, France	
5000 m	15:02.00	Katalin Szentgyörgyi	2 June 2002		Hengelo, Netherlands	
5 km (road)	15:27	Aniko Kalovics	13 September 2008		Prague, Czech Republic	
10,000 m	31:40.31	Anikó Kálovics	5 July 2003		Watford, United Kingdom	
10 km (road)	31:41	Beáta Rakonczai	21 May 2006	Great Manchester Run	Manchester, United Kingdom	
15 km (road)	49:24	Anikó Kálovics	21 November 2004		Nijmegen, Netherlands	
One hour	17052.05 m	Judit Nagy	22 October 1989		Székesfehérvár, Hungary	
20,000 m (track)	1:10:56.6	Ágnes Özéné Sipka	16 October 1988		Székesfehérvár, Hungary	
20 km (road)	1:06:20	Anikó Kálovics	8 October 2006	World Road Running Championships	Debrecen, Hungary	
Half marathon	1:08:58	Anikó Kálovics	1 April 2007		Milan, Italy	
25,000 m (track)	1:29:29.2+	Karolina Szabó	22 April 1988		Budapest, Hungary	
25 km (road)	1:25:56	Karolina Szabó	18 April 1987		Paderborn, Germany	
25 km (road)	1:25:34+	Lili Anna Vindics-Tóth	27 September 2026	Warsaw Marathon	Warsaw, Poland	
30,000 m (track)	1:47:05.6	Karolina Szabó	22 April 1988		Budapest, Hungary	
30 km (road)	1:44:16+	Nóra Szabó	1 December 2024	Valencia Marathon	Valencia, Spain	
30 km (road)	1:42:42+	Lili Anna Vindics-Tóth	27 September 2026	Warsaw Marathon	Warsaw, Poland	
Marathon	2:25:52	Nóra Szabó	1 December 2024	Valencia Marathon	Valencia, Spain	
Marathon	2:24:48	Lili Anna Vindics-Tóth	27 September 2026	Warsaw Marathon	Warsaw, Poland	
6 hours	80.093 km	Ágnes Garai	9 March 2024		Tapolca, Hungary	
100 km	7:25:21	Edit Bérces	9 September 2000		Winschoten, Netherlands	
100 Miles (track)	14:25:45+	Edit Bérces	21–22 September 2002	Verona 24 Hour	Verona, Italy	
100 m hurdles	12.69 (+0.3 m/s)	Luca Kozák	21 August 2022	European Championships	Munich, Germany	
100 m hurdles	12.69 (−0.1 m/s)	Luca Kozák	21 August 2022	European Championships	Munich, Germany	
100 m hurdles	12.66 (−0.2 m/s)	Luca Kozák	29 May 2026	Irena Szewińska Memorial	Bydgoszcz, Poland	
100 m hurdles	12.59 (−0.4 m/s)	Luca Kozák	14 July 2026	Gyulai István Memorial	Budapest, Hungary	
300 m hurdles	40.89	Sára Mátó	8 September 2020	Golden Spike Ostrava	Ostrava, Czech Republic	
400 m hurdles	54.02	Judit Szekeres	23 January 1998		Roodepoort, South Africa	
2000 m steeplechase	6:09.48	Viktória Wagner-Gyürkés	1 September 2019	ISTAF Berlin	Berlin, Germany	
3000 m steeplechase	9:26.59	Zita Kácser	31 August 2019		Budapest, Hungary	
High jump	2.00 m	Dóra Győrffy	26 July 2001		Nyíregyháza, Hungary	
Pole vault	4.60 m	Hanga Klekner	2 August 2025	Hungarian Championships	Budapest, Hungary	
Pole vault	4.60 m	Hanga Klekner	15 August 2025	Kamila Skolimowska Memorial	Chorzów, Poland	
Long jump	6.86 m (+1.3 m/s)	Tünde Vaszi	7 August 2001	World Championships	Edmonton, Canada	
Triple jump	14.00 m (+1.3 m/s)	Zita Bálint	11 May 1996		Budapest, Hungary	
Shot put	19.87 m	Anita Márton	12 August 2016	Olympic Games	Rio de Janeiro, Brazil	
Discus throw	66.48 m	Márta Kripli	11 August 1986		Budapest, Hungary	
Hammer throw	73.44 m	Éva Orbán	25 May 2013	Werfertage	Halle, Germany	
Javelin throw	64.62 m	Nikolett Szabó	22 July 2001		Patras, Greece	
Javelin throw	67.18 m (Old design)	Zsuzsa Malovecz	22 May 1988		Forlì, Italy	
Heptathlon	6651 pts	Xénia Krizsán	29–30 May 2018	Hypo-Meeting	Götzis, Austria	
Heptathlon	100m H (wind) / High jump / Shot put / 200m (wind) / Long jump (wind) / Javelin / 800m; 13.31 (+0.1 m/s) / 1.80 m / 14.47 m / 24.32 (+1.3 m/s) / 6.41 m (+1.1 m/s) / 52.02 m / 2:11.51					
Mile walk	6:35.97	Tiziana Spiller	1 July 2026	Raiffeisen Austrian Open	Eisenstadt, Austria	
5000 m walk (track)	21:01.41	Viktória Madarász	5 September 2020		Székesfehérvár, Hungary	
5 km walk (road)	21:23+	Mária Rosza Urbanikné	25 April 1998		Dudince, Slovakia	
10,000 m walk (track)	44:13.76	Mária Rosza Urbanikné	4 August 1997	World Championships	Athens, Greece	
10 km walk (road)	42:34	Mária Rosza Urbanikné	7 August 1995	World Championships	Gothenburg, Sweden	
20,000 m walk (track)	1:36:06.05	Viktória Madarász	30 June 2024	Hungarian Championships	Budapest, Hungary	
20 km walk (road)	1:30:05	Viktória Madarász	13 August 2017	World Championships	London, United Kingdom	
Half marathon walk (road)	1:35:32	Tiziana Spiller	15 August 2026	European Championships	Birmingham, United Kingdom	
35 km walk (road)	2:49:58	Viktória Madarász	16 August 2022	European Championships	Munich, Germany	
50 km walk (road)	4:40:05	Andrea Kovács	19 May 2019	European Cup	Alytus, Lithuania	
4 × 100 m relay	43.33	Hungary; Jusztina Csóti; Alexa Sulyán; Boglárka Takács; Anna Luca Kocsis	28 June 2025	European Team Championships	Madrid, Spain	
4 × 100 m relay	42.84	Hungary; Zita Szentgyörgyi; Boglárka Takács; Luca Kozák; Lili Hanna Brucker	15 August 2026	European Championships	Birmingham, United Kingdom	
4 × 200 m relay	1:34.65	Hungary; Judit Ács; Ágnes Kozáry; Judit Forgács; Edit Molnár	26 June 1982		Budapest, Hungary	
4 × 400 m relay	3:27.79	Hungary; Evelín Nádházy; Bianka Kéri; Fanni Rapai; Janka Molnár	26 August 2023	World Championships	Budapest, Hungary	
4 × 800 m relay	8:35.69	Újpesti Dózsa Sport Club; Márta Gombos; Heléna Barócsi; Andrea Bartakovics; Katalin Rácz	29 May 1988	Hungarian Championships	Budapest, Hungary	

=== Mixed ===
Event	Record	Athlete	Date	Meet	Place	Ref.
4 × 100 m relay	41.21	Hungary; Krisztián Kalics; Boglárka Takács; Dominik Pázmándi; Zita Szentgyörgyi	11 September 2026	World Athletics Ultimate Championship	Budapest, Hungary	
4 × 400 m relay	3:14.08 (Note: by official result source; 3:14.07 by MASZ source, a typo)	Hungary; Attila Molnár; Bianka Kéri; Zoltán Wahl; Janka Molnár	19 August 2023	World Championships	Budapest, Hungary	

== Indoor ==
=== Men ===
Event	Record	Athlete	Date	Meet	Place	Ref.
50 m	5.71	Roland Németh	5 February 2000		Nyíregyháza, Hungary	
60 m	6.52	Dominik Illovszky	11 February 2026		Belgrade, Serbia	
100 m	10.28	Roland Németh	4 March 2000		Budapest, Hungary	
200 m	20.84	István Nagy	24 February 1985		Budapest, Hungary	
400 m	45.01	Attila Molnár	3 February 2026	Czech Indoor Gala	Ostrava, Czech Republic	
600 m	1:16.59	Balázs Korányi	30 January 1999		Stange, Norway	
800 m	1:46.20	Balázs Vindics	23 February 2020	Hungarian Championships	Budapest, Hungary	
1000 m	2:20.30	Róbert Banai	21 January 1990		Sindelfingen, Germany	
1500 m	3:37.55	Istvan Szogi	30 January 2021	Indoor Track & Field Vienna	Vienna, Austria	
2000 m	5:02.98	Róbert Banai	14 February 1990		Budapest, Hungary	
3000 m	7:48.81	Gabor Szabo	1 February 1986		Budapest, Hungary	
5000 m	14:03.03	Tibor Vegh	15 February 2008	Tyson Invitational	Fayetteville, United States	
50 m hurdles	6.63	Gergely Palágyi	11 February 2004		Szolnok, Hungary	
60 m hurdles	7.53	Balázs Baji	19 February 2017	Hungarian Championships	Budapest, Hungary	
110 m hurdles	13.74	Balázs Kovács	28 February 1999		Budapest, Hungary	
High jump	2.27 m	Péter Deutsch	24 February 1990		Budapest, Hungary	
Pole vault	5.82 m	István Bagyula	7 February 1992	Millrose Games	New York, United States	
Long jump	8.24 m	László Szalma	22 February 1986	European Championships	Madrid, Spain	
Triple jump	17.25 m (Note: Outdoor mark ratified as absolute record)	Béla Bakosi	6 March 1988		Budapest, Hungary	
Shot put	20.81 m	Zsolt Bíber	15 February 2004		Budapest, Hungary	
Weight throw (35 lb)	19.78 m	Gábor Máté	2 March 2003	SEC Indoor Championships	Gainesville, United States	
Heptathlon	6249 pts	Dezső Szabó	28 February–1 March 1998	European Championships	Valencia, Spain	
Heptathlon	60m / Long jump / Shot put / High jump / 60m H / Pole vault / 1000m; 7.00 / 7.50 m / 14.40 m / 2.02 m / 8.09 / 5.30 m / 2:38.12					
5000 m walk	18:34.77	Sándor Urbanik	5 March 1989	World Championships	Budapest, Hungary	
4 × 200 m relay	1:25.53	Hungary; Gábor Dobos; Miklós Gyulai; Péter Nyilasi; Szabolcs Makláry	17 February 1996		Vienna, Austria	
4 × 400 m relay	3:06.03	Hungary; Patrik Simon Enyingi; Zoltán Wahl; Árpád Kovács; Attila Molnár	23 March 2025	World Championships	Nanjing, China	
4 × 400 m relay	3:05.67	Hungary; Árpád Kovács; Zoltán Wahl; Ernő Steigerwald; Csanád Csahóczi	22 March 2026	World Championships	Toruń, Poland	

=== Women ===
Event	Record	Athlete	Date	Meet	Place	Ref.
50 m	6.37	Zsuzsa Károly	3 February 1974		Berlin, West Germany	
60 m	7.09	Boglárka Takács	9 March 2025	European Championships	Apeldoorn, Netherlands	
100 m	11.64	Éva Barati	4 March 1995		Budapest, Hungary	
200 m	23.38	Alexa Sulyán	23 February 2025	Hungarian Championships	Nyíregyháza, Hungary	
300 m	37.89	Evelin Nádházy	12 February 2019	Czech Indoor Gala	Ostrava, Czech Republic	
400 m	52.29	Judit Forgács	8 February 1987		Budapest, Hungary	
800 m	2:01.80	Judit Varga	5 February 1999	Hungarian Indoor Grand Prix	Budapest, Hungary	
1000 m	2:40.16	Judit Varga	30 January 1999		Stange, Norway	
1500 m	4:06.04	Judit Varga	15 February 2004	BW-Bank Meeting	Karlsruhe, Germany	
3000 m	8:55.99	Zita Ágoston	6 March 1988	European Championships	Budapest, Hungary	
5000 m	16:00.17	Krisztina Papp	31 January 2004		Stuttgart, Germany	
50 m hurdles	6.89	Xénia Siska	21 February 1981	European Championships	Grenoble, France	
60 m hurdles	7.92	Luca Kozák	27 February 2022	Hungarian Championships	Nyíregyháza, Hungary	
60 m hurdles	7.88	Luca Kozák	22 March 2026	World Championships	Toruń, Poland	
100 m hurdles	13.27	Edit Vári	7 March 2003		Budapest, Hungary	
High jump	1.99 m	Katalin Sterk	7 March 1982	European Championships	Milan, Italy	
Pole vault	4.56 m	Hanga Klekner	20 February 2024	Memorial Josip Gasparac	Osijek, Croatia	
Long jump	6.82 m	Tünde Vaszi	29 January 1999		Chemnitz, Germany	
Triple jump	13.93 m	Zita Bálint	29 January 1998		Ostrava, Czech Republic	
Shot put	19.62 m	Anita Márton	2 March 2018	World Championships	Birmingham, United Kingdom	
Weight throw	18.19 m	Barbara Sugár	10 March 2006	NAIA Indoor Championships	Johnson City, United States	
Pentathlon	4775 pts	Rita Ináncsi	11 March 1994	European Championships	Paris, France	
Pentathlon	60m H / High jump / Shot put / Long jump / 800m; 8.39 / 1.87 m / 14.47 m / 6.57 m / 2:20.87					
3000 m walk	12:19.08	Ildikó Ilyés	26 February 1991		Budapest, Hungary	
5000 m walk	22:33.06	Tiziana Spiller	24 January 2026	Hungarian Race Walking Championships	Nyíregyháza, Hungary	
4 × 200 m relay	1:37.33	Hungary; Renáta Balázsic; Barbara Petráhn; Krisztina Lőrincz; Éva Barati	15 February 1997		Vienna, Austria	
4 × 400 m relay	3:38.30	Hungary; Evelin Nádházy; Míra Kőszegi; Janka Molnár; Virág Simon	12 February 2019	Czech Indoor Gala	Ostrava, Czech Republic	
