= 2024 Hungarian Athletics Championships =

2024 Hungarian Athletics Championships 129th Hungarian Championships in Athletics
- Edition: 129th
- Dates: 29–30 June
- Host city: Budapest, Hungary
- Venue: Lantos Mihály Sportközpont
- Level: Senior
- Type: Outdoor

The 2024 Hungarian Athletics Championships (Hungarian: 2024-es magyar atlétikai bajnokság) will the 129th edition of the national championship in outdoor track and field for athletes in Hungary. It will hold between 29 and 30 June at the Lantos Mihály Sportközpont in Budapest.

The schedule of events other than this tournament is as follows:

- Winter throwing - 28 February (Budapest, National Athletics Centre)
- 20 kilometres race walk - 24 March (Békéscsaba)
- Marathon - 21 April (Vienna City Marathon)
- 10,000 m - 27 April (Gödöllő, MATE Athletics Centre)
- Relays - 18 May (Kaposvár, Bodosi Mihály Athletics Centre)
- Combined - 25–26 May (Budapest, Lantos Mihály Sportközpont)
- 10 kilometres race walk - 22 June (Budapest, Iharos Sándor Athletics Centre)
- Tracks - 29–30 June (Budapest, Lantos Mihály Sportközpont)
- Half marathon - 8 September, Budapest
- Cross country running - 16 November

== Results ==
=== Hungarian Athletics Championships ===
==== Men ====
Event	Gold		Silver		Bronze	
100 metres	Zalán Deák; KARC (Kecskemét)	10.44 PB	Dániel Szabó; ARAK	10.48 SB	Bence Boros; Nyíregyháza SC	10.59
200 metres	Attila Molnár; Ferencvárosi TC	20.84 PB	Zoltán Wahl; Tatabányai SC-Geotech	21.09	Zalán Deák; KARC (Kecskemét)	21.13 PB
400 metres	Attila Molnár; Ferencvárosi TC	45.40	Patrik Enyingi; MATE-GEAC	46.00 PB	Árpád Kovács; Szegedi Vasutas SE	46.32 =PB
800 metres	Balázs Vindics; Újpesti TE	1:49.54	Levente Pálvölgyi; A-Plast Ikarus BSE	1:49.63 PB	Ferenc Soma Kovács; Sportolj Velünk SE	1:50.43 SB
1500 metres	Ferenc Soma Kovács; Sportolj Velünk SE	3:47.17	István Szögi; Sportolj Velünk SE	3:47.72	Albert Szirbek; Sportolj Velünk SE	3:49.05
5000 metres	István Szögi; Sportolj Velünk SE	14:11.17 SB	Barnabás Sós; Margitszigeti AC	14:15.65 PB	Ádám Lomb; Pécsi VSK	14:16.23 PB
10 000 metres	Ádám Lomb; Pécsi VSK	29:49.64	Gáspár Csere; TFSE	29:50.42	Barnabás Sós; Margitszigeti AC	30:18.55
110 metres hurdles	Bálint Szeles; Egri Városi Sportiskola	13.73	Dániel Eszes; Városi Sportegyesület Dunakeszi	13.96	Zsombor Gálpál; Budapesti Honvéd SE	14.10 PB
400 metres hurdles	Árpád Bánóczy; Vasas	50.19	Csaba Molnár; A-Plast Ikarus BSE	50.89	Bátor Birovecz; Újpesti TE	51.03 PB
3000 metres steeplechase	István Palkovits; KARC (Kecskemét)	8:44.74	Ármin Lesták; MATE-GEAC	8:48.97 PB	Bence Deák; Budapesti Honvéd SE	9:18.50 PB
4 × 100 metres	János Csornai; Balázs Mészáros; Dániel Szabó; Gergő Bolla; Alba Regia AK	40.86	Máté Medgyessy; Dominik Pázmándi; János Sipos; Dániel Szabó; Szolnoki MÁV-SE	41.60	Zalán Kádasi; Péter Szilágyi; Balázs Zsolt Kállai; Zsombor Gálpál; Budapesti Honvéd SE	41.66
4 × 200 metres	János Csornai; Dániel Szabó; Gergő Bolla; Balázs Mészáros; Alba Regia AK	1:26.90	András Berek; Marcell Zuber; Iván Dublinszki; Martin Rivasz; Ferencvárosi TC	1:27.56	Dávid Durkó; Richárd Szücs; Ádám Komáromi; Máté Pesti; Csepel TC	1:32.35
4 × 400 metres	Marcell Szilveszter; Csanád Csahóczi; Balázs Vindics; Bátor Birovecz; Újpesti TE	3:10.72	Péter Fodor; Máté Együd; Levente Nadj; Patrik Enyingi; MATE-GEAC	3:11.12	Zalán Zemen; Bence Marx; Attila Makovinyi; Péter Simon; Győri Atlétikai Club	3:21.11
4 × 800 metres	Marcell Lázár; Bátor Birovecz; Dávid Pap; Bálint Szinte; Újpesti TE	7:43.22	Tamás Valler; László Fritz; András Fazekas; Ádám Lomb; Pécsi VSK	7:47.80	Attila Makovinyi; Barna Szalai; Péter Simon; Bence Marx; Győri AC	7:49.34
High jump	Dániel Jankovics; MTK Budapest	2.23 PB	Péter Bakosi; Nyíregyháza SC	2.12	Mátyás Guth; MATE-GEAC	2.12
Pole vault	Márton Böndör; Győri Atlétikai Club	5.32	Tamás Kéri; Ferencvárosi TC	5.10	Iván Varga; MTK Budapest	5.00 =PB
Long jump	László Szabó; Ferencvárosi TC	7.81 SB	Kristóf Pap; TFSE	7.79	Áron Hajdu; Diósgyőri VTK	7.65
Triple jump	Tibor Galambos; Ferencvárosi TC	15.40	Martin Rivasz; Ferencvárosi TC	15.16	Zsombor Iván; Debreceni Sportiskola	14.94
Shot put	Balázs Tóth; Nyíregyháza SC	17.51	László Kovács; A-Plast Ikarus BSE	17.24	István Fekete; KARC (Kecskemét)	17.16
Discus throw	Róbert Szikszai; Nyíregyháza SC	61.62 SB	János Richárd Huszák; Dobó SE	60.13	Zalán Strigencz; VEDAC (Veszprém)	55.53
Hammer throw	Dániel Rába; Dobó SE	73.99	Gábor Czeller; VEDAC (Veszprém)	73.17	Donát Varga; Dobó SE	71.13
Javelin throw	Norbert Rivasz-Tóth; Szolnoki SC-SI	70.02	Noel Kovács; A-Plast Ikarus BSE	68.99 SB	György Herczeg; Ferencvárosi TC	68.16
Decathlon	Zsombor Gálpál; Budapest Honvéd	7985	Dávid Gábris; KSI	6221	Tibor Tari; TFSE	5902
5000 metres race walk	Norbert Tóth; H. Szondi SE	21:00.17	Dávid Tokodi; Ferencvárosi TC	21:38.39 SB	Benjámin Bor; Békéscsabai AC	21:57.05 PB
10 000 metres race walk	Máté Helebrandt; Nyíregyháza SC	39:05.1	Bence Venyercsán; Budapest Honvéd	39:11.1	Norbert Tóth; Honvéd Szondi SE	41:20.1
20 000 metres race walk	Imre Csontos; BEAC	1:42:30.30 PB	Dávid Tokodi; Ferencvárosi TC	1:42:43.26 PB	Ferenc Papp; Szegedi Vasutas SE	1:50:45.83 PB
Marathon	Levente Szemerei; Szekszárdi SK	2:14:12	Ferenc Burucs; ELTE Sashegyi Gepárdok	2:26:00	Zsombor Zvekán; Tiszakécske VSE	2:32:04
Marathon – team	Levente Szemerei; Előd Zsigmond; Péter Czencz; Szekszárdi SK	7:36:01	Ferenc Burucs; Gábor Szabó; Gábor Németh; ELTE Sashegyi Gepárdok 1	7:43:18	Sándor Borbély; Attila Kovács; János Tomka; Szombathelyi Egyetemi SE	9:11:02
Cross country running – 8000 metres						
Cross country running – team						

==== Women ====
Event	Gold		Silver		Bronze	
100 metres	Boglárka Takács; Budapest Honvéd SE	11.19	Jusztina Csóti; Ferencvárosi TC	11.48 SB	Alexa Sulyán; MATE-GEAC	11.57
200 metres	Boglárka Takács; Budapest Honvéd SE	23.21	Alexa Sulyán; MATE-GEAC	23.39	Sarolta Kriszt; MATE-GEAC	23.94 PB
400 metres	Sarolta Kriszt; MATE-GEAC	52.56 U20-NR	Zita Szentgyörgyi; MTK Budapest	53.23 PB	Virág Simon; MATE-GEAC	53.58 PB
800 metres	Bianka Bartha-Kéri; Sportolj Velünk SE	2:05.06	Gréta Janositz; BEAC	2:07.28 PB	Ágnes Muszil; Zalaszám-ZAC	2:08.01 PB
1500 metres	Lilla Böhm; Budapest Honvéd SE	4:14.98 PB	Ágnes Muszil; Zalaszám-ZAC	4:20.96 SB	Sára Derdák; Sportolj Velünk SE	4:25.76
5000 metres	Lili Vindics-Tóth; Budapest Honvéd SE	15:50.71	Lilla Böhm; Budapest Honvéd SE	15:55.73 PB	Fanni Szalai; Margitszigeti AC	16:20.81 U18-NR
10 000 metres	Viktória Gyürkés; Ikarus BSE	32:45.88	Lilla Böhm; Budapest Honvéd	33:54.16	Kata Tomaschof; Ferencvárosi TC	37:23.14
100 metres hurdles	Anna Tóth; Diósgyőri VTK	13.0	Gréta Kerekes; Debreceni Sportiskola	13.0	Petra Répási; Ferencvárosi TC	13.3
400 metres hurdles	Sára Mátó; MATE-GEAC	55.47	Petra Lalik; Diósgyőri VTK	58.91	Kata Prutkay; A-Plast Ikarus BSE	1:00.72 PB
3000 metres steeplechase	Zita Urbán; Budapest Honvéd SE	10:22.13	Lilla Jánosi; TFSE	11:05.23	Eszter Dobó; Vasas	11:11.86
4 × 100 metres	Petra Répási; Jusztina Csóti; Szilvia Szikossy; Liliána Guba; Ferencvárosi TC	45.08	Panna Káldi; Anna Mária Kovács; Pálma Nagy; Ágnes Major; Zalaszám-ZAC	49.87	–	
4 × 200 metres	Szilvia Szikossy; Liliána Guba; Dóra Szücs; Panka Kulcsár; Ferencvárosi TC	1:39.07	Boróka Boldogh; Nikolett Gál; Gréta Rőczei; Petra Lalik; Diósgyőri VTK	1:42.80	Eszter Bán; Barbara Tóth; Diána Nyilasi; Léna Kovács; Újpesti TE	1:45.07
4 × 400 metres	Laura Dobránszky; Sára Mátó; Laura Lőkös; Evelin Nádházy; MATE-GEAC	3:42.08	Hanna Ádám; Kata Felber; Petra Besenyődi; Bianka Bartha-Kéri; Sportolj Velünk SE	3:46.72	Diána Nyilasi; Alíz Kalmár; Léna Kovács; Lili Brucker; Újpesti TE	3:48.06
4 × 800 metres	Zsófia Mező; Gréta Varga; Nóra Nagy; Sára Derdák; Sportolj Velünk SE	9:18.49	Krisztina Hazay; Kata Kocsis; Dominika Varga; Boróka Lóránt; Ferencvárosi TC	9:35.02	Boglárka Moser; Petra Gál; Enikő Grubits; Tamara Köcsky; Soproni Műegyetemi Atlétikai és Football Club	9:46.17
High jump	Lilianna Bátori; Vasas	1.87 PB	Fédra Fekete; Budapest Honvéd SE	1.75	Blanka Macsali; Vasas	1.68
Pole vault	Hanga Klekner; Debreceni Sportiskola	4.57 NR	Emma Mészáros; KSI SE	3.90	Petra Garamvölgyi; Pécsi VSK	3.90
Long jump	Petra Bánhidi-Farkas; Budapest Honvéd SE	6.60	Diana Lesti; Tatabányai SC-Geotech	6.53	Klaudia Endrész; KARC (Kecskemét)	6.25
Triple jump	Erna Virók; Ferencvárosi TC	13.10 PB	Petra Nyisztor; Nyíregyháza SC	12.84	Beatrix Szabó; MTK Budapest	12.78
Shot put	Renáta Beregszászi; Szegedi Vasutas SE	15.93	Violetta Veiland; Szegedi Vasutas SE	14.93	Réka Kling; AC Bonyhád	14.36 SB
Discus throw	Dóra Kerekes; Nyíregyháza SC	50.99	Krisztina Váradi; Maximus SE	47.33 SB	Petra Baukó; Békéscsabai AC	47.25 PB
Hammer throw	Réka Gyurátz; Dobó SE	68.78	Zsanett Németh; Dobó SE	66.13	Villő Viszkeleti; Dobó SE	62.03
Javelin throw	Fanni Kövér; Veszprémi EDAC	54.87 SB	Annabella Bogdán; Békéscsabai AC	54.05	Angéla Diósi-Moravcsik; MTK Budapest	52.87
Heptathlon	Rita Nemes; MTK Budapest	6276	Szabina Szűcs; Budapest Honvéd	5996	Sarolta Kriszt; MATE-GEAC	5956
5000 metres race walk	Alexandra Kovács; Békéscsabai AC	22:32.96	Tiziana Spiller; Budapest Honvéd SE	23:04.67 PB	Dóra Csörgő; Budapest Honvéd SE	24:19.46
10 000 metres race walk	Rita Récsei; Budapest Honvéd	44:55.77	Barbara Oláh; Békéscsabai AC	45:54.25	Alexandra Kovács; Békéscsabai AC	45:59.35
20 000 metres race walk	Viktória Madarász; Újpesti TE	1:36:06.05 NR	Anett Torma; Győri Atlétikai Club	2:09:01.37	–	
20 km race walk – team	Rita Récsei; Tiziana Spiller; Dóra Csörgő; Budapest Honvéd	4:48.41	–		–	
Marathon	Eszter Csillag; Csömör	2:42:46	Fruzsina Bakonyi; Footour SE Tata	2:48:55	Eszter Barabás; ELTE Sashegyi Gepárdok	2:51:01
Marathon – team	Eszter Csillag; Kinga Zólyomi; Magdolna Kálóczi-Tóth; Csömör	8:51:55	Eszter Barabás; Ágnes Garai; Panna Zákányi; ELTE Sashegyi Gepárdok	8:56:50	–	
Cross country running – 5000 metres						
Cross country running – team						

=== Winter Throwing Hungarian Championships ===
==== Men ====
Event	Gold		Silver		Bronze	
Discus throw	Márton Csontos; Budaörsi Sport Club	54.54 m	Zsombor Dobó; Szegedi Vasutas Sport Egyesület	54.26 m	Zalán Strigencz; Veszprémi Egyetemi és Diák Atlétikai Club	50.91 m
Hammer throw	Bence Halász; Dobó SE	75.48 m	Donát Varga; Dobó SE	72.49 m	Gábor Czeller; Veszprémi Egyetemi és Diák Atlétikai Club	71.85 m
Javelin throw	György Herczeg; Ferencvárosi TC	79.66 m	Dávid Fedor; Újpesti TE	61.17 m	Kristóf Tombor; Veszprémi Egyetemi és Diák Atlétikai Club	58.90 m

==== Women ====
Event	Gold		Silver		Bronze	
Discus throw	Dóra Kerekes; Níregyháza SC	51.19 m	Krisztina Váradi; Maximus SE	45.46 m	Sára Péter-Szabó; Szegedi Vasutas Sport Egyesület	44.35 m
Hammer throw	Réka Gyurátz; Dobó SE	65.48 m	Villő Viszkeleti; Dobó SE	63.55 m	Jázmin Csatári; Veszprémi Egyetemi és Diák Atlétikai Club	62.93 m
Javelin throw	Réka Szilágyi; Debreceni Sportcentrum	60.17 m	Annabella Bogdán; Békéscsabai AC	58.82 m	Napsugár Eszenyi; MATE-GEAC	42.74 m

== See also ==
- List of Hungarian records in athletics
