= Athletics at the 2025 Summer World University Games – Men's 400 metres =

Men's 400 metres at the 2025 Summer World University Games
- Venue: Lohrheidestadion
- Location: Bochum, Germany
- Dates: 21 July (heats); 22 July (semi-finals); 23 July (final)
- Competitors: 52 from 39 nations
- Winning time: 44.84 SB

Medalists
gold medal	Lythe Pillay	South Africa
silver medal	Patrik Simon Enyingi	Hungary
bronze medal	Edoardo Scotti	Italy

The men's 400 metres event at the 2025 Summer World University Games was held in Bochum, Germany, at Lohrheidestadion on 21, 22 and 23 July.

== Records ==
Prior to the competition, the records were as follows:

Record	Athlete (nation)	Time (s)	Location	Date
Games record	João Coelho (POR)	44.79	Chengdu, China	3 August 2023

== Results ==
=== Heats ===
First 3 in each heat (Q) and the next 3 fastest (q) qualified for the semi-finals.

==== Heat 1 ====
Place	Athlete	Nation	Time	Notes
1	Kira Hirakawa	Japan	46.55	Q
2	Jake Palermo	United States	46.56	Q
3	Kago Seshoka	Botswana	46.80	Q
4	Abou Adama Sane	Senegal	46.94	q, PB
5	Andreas Wolf	Austria	47.50	q
6	Methawi Kanhaaudom	Thailand	48.20	SB
7	Daniel Earles	Canada	48.40	
8	Novruz Asadli	Azerbaijan	50.24	

==== Heat 2 ====
Place	Athlete	Nation	Time	Notes
1	Edoardo Scotti	Italy	46.81	Q
2	Marcin Karolewski	Poland	46.97	Q
3	Lex Revell-Lewis	New Zealand	47.55	Q
4	Nathaniel Dyas	Great Britain	48.49	
5	Joseph Okolimo	Uganda	48.55	
6	Jirateep Bundee	Thailand	49.95	
—	Muhammad Aidil Azrul	Malaysia	DQ	TR 17.2.3

==== Heat 3 ====
Place	Athlete	Nation	Time	Notes
1	Vincent Gendre	Switzerland	46.97	Q
2	Kubilay Ençü	Turkey	47.29	Q
3	Terrell Thorne	Australia	47.40	Q, PB
4	Maj Janža	Slovenia	47.59	
5	Keshawn Igbinosun	Canada	47.75	PB
6	Junsung Kim	South Korea	48.66	
—	Isuru Welapala Gedara	Sri Lanka	DQ	TR 17.2.3

==== Heat 4 ====
Place	Athlete	Nation	Time	Notes
1	Jack Raftery	Ireland	46.39	Q
2	Matěj Krsek	Czech Republic	46.48	Q
3	Matthew Galea Soler	Malta	46.82	Q
4	Umar Osman	Malaysia	46.97	q
5	Isaiah Sayialel	Kenya	50.05	
6	Jhoan Julio Hoyos	Colombia	50.07	
7	Yousuf Al-Malki	Oman	51.39	
8	Jorge Mendoza Galindo	Honduras	51.85	PB

==== Heat 5 ====
Place	Athlete	Nation	Time	Notes
1	Lythe Pillay	South Africa	46.25	Q
2	İlyas Çanakçı	Turkey	46.77	Q
3	Tomáš Grajcarík	Slovakia	47.09	Q, PB
4	Mouje Tjazeri	Botswana	47.75	
5	Abhishek	India	48.58	
6	Robin Sapar	Estonia	48.93	
7	Everts Hemmelis	Latvia	49.45	

==== Heat 6 ====
Place	Athlete	Nation	Time	Notes
1	Tumisang Shezi	South Africa	47.08	Q
2	Seungkyun Joo	South Korea	47.24	Q
3	Chun Ho Chan	Hong Kong	47.62	Q
4	Juan Martin Barbas	Argentina	48.67	PB
5	Juan Esteban Wilches	Colombia	49.19	
6	Santiago Paul Llerena	Ecuador	50.00	
—	Salim Zubairu Bello	Nigeria	DNF	
—	Thomas Reynolds	Australia	DQ	TR 16.8

==== Heat 7 ====
Place	Athlete	Nation	Time	Notes
1	Patrik Simon Enyingi	Hungary	46.59	Q
2	Daniel Sołtysiak	Poland	46.83	Q
3	Nayyir Newash-Campbell	United States	47.47	Q
4	Johnson Nyeko	Uganda	48.26	
5	Ian Romeo Estrello	Mexico	49.59	
6	Hussein al Sabaaa	Saudi Arabia	49.99	
—	Hamzah Abdulla al Jabri	Oman	DQ	TR 17.2.3

=== Semi-finals ===
First 2 in each heat (Q) and the next 2 fastest (q) qualified for the final.

==== Heat 1 ====
Place	Athlete	Nation	Time	Notes
1	Lythe Pillay	South Africa	45.53	Q
2	Marcin Karolewski	Poland	45.92	Q, PB
3	Terrell Thorne	Australia	46.63	
4	Vincent Gendre	Switzerland	46.80	
5	İlyas Çanakçı	Turkey	47.11	
6	Seungkyun Joo	South Korea	47.18	
7	Andreas Wolf	Austria	47.77	
8	Nayyir Newash-Campbell	United States	48.12	

==== Heat 2 ====
Place	Athlete	Nation	Time	Notes
1	Edoardo Scotti	Italy	45.89	Q
2	Daniel Sołtysiak	Poland	46.04	Q
3	Jack Raftery	Ireland	46.07	q
4	Matěj Krsek	Czech Republic	46.16	q
5	Lex Revell-Lewis	New Zealand	46.47	
6	Umar Osman	Malaysia	47.10	
7	Kubilay Ençü	Turkey	47.40	
8	Tomáš Grajcarík	Slovakia	47.76	

==== Heat 3 ====
Place	Athlete	Nation	Time	Notes
1	Patrik Simon Enyingi	Hungary	46.06	Q
2	Kira Hirakawa	Japan	46.18	Q
3	Matthew Galea Soler	Malta	46.63	PB
4	Abou Adama Sane	Senegal	46.76	PB
5	Kago Seshoka	Botswana	46.86	
6	Chun Ho Chan	Hong Kong	47.76	
—	Tumisang Shezi	South Africa	DNF	
—	Jake Palermo	United States	DQ	

=== Final ===
Place	Athlete	Nation	Time	Notes
1st place, gold medalist(s)	Lythe Pillay	South Africa	44.84	SB
2nd place, silver medalist(s)	Patrik Simon Enyingi	Hungary	45.41	
3rd place, bronze medalist(s)	Edoardo Scotti	Italy	45.61	
4	Jack Raftery	Ireland	45.69	
5	Matěj Krsek	Czech Republic	45.84	SB
6	Marcin Karolewski	Poland	46.16	
7	Daniel Sołtysiak	Poland	46.28	
8	Kira Hirakawa	Japan	46.68	
