= 2025 European Athletics Indoor Championships – Men's 400 metres =

Men's 400 metres at the 2025 European Athletics Indoor Championships
- Venue: Omnisport Apeldoorn
- Location: Apeldoorn, Netherlands
- Dates: 7 March 2025 (round 1 and semi-finals); 8 March 2025 (final)
- Competitors: 28 from 16 nations
- Winning time: 45.25

Medalists
gold medal	Attila Molnár	Hungary
silver medal	Maksymilian Szwed	Poland
bronze medal	Jimy Soudril	France

The men's 400 metres at the 2025 European Athletics Indoor Championships was held on the short track of Omnisport in Apeldoorn, Netherlands, on 7 and 8 March 2025. This was the 38th time the event was contested at the European Athletics Indoor Championships. Athletes qualified by achieving the entry standard or by their World Athletics Ranking in the event.

== Background ==
The men's 400 metres was contested 37 times before 2025, at every previous edition of the European Athletics Indoor Championships (1970–2023). The 2025 European Athletics Indoor Championships was held in Omnisport Apeldoorn in Apeldoorn, Netherlands. The removable indoor athletics track was retopped for these championships in September 2024.

Christopher Morales Williams of Canada is the world record holder with a time of 44.49 s set in 2024. The European record is 45.05, set by both Thomas Schönlebe of East Germany and Karsten Warholm of Norway, set in 1988 and 2019 respectively. Warholm's time is the current championship record, set at the 2019 championships.

Records before the 2025 European Athletics Indoor Championships
Record	Athlete (nation)	Time (s)	Location	Date
World record	Christopher Morales-Williams (CAN)	44.49	Fayetteville, United States	24 February 2024
European record	Thomas Schönlebe (GDR)	45.05	Sindelfingen, West Germany	5 February 1988
European record	Karsten Warholm (NOR)	45.05	Glasgow, Great Britain	2 March 2019
Championship record	Karsten Warholm (NOR)	45.05	Glasgow, Great Britain	2 March 2019
World leading	Christopher Bailey (USA)	44.70	Fayetteville, United States	14 February 2025
European leading	Attila Molnár (HUN)	45.08	Ostrava, Czech Republic	4 February 2025

== Qualification ==
For the men's 400 metres, the qualification period ran from 25 February 2024 until 23 February 2025. Athletes qaulified by achieving the entry standards of 46.20 s indoors or 45.00 s outdoor or by virtue of their World Athletics Ranking for the event. There was a target number of 30 athletes.

== Results ==
=== Round 1 ===
Round 1 is scheduled for 7 March, starting at 12:45 (UTC+1) in the afternoon. First 2 in each heat (Q) and the next 2 by time (q) qualified for the semi-finals.

==== Heat 1 ====
Rank	Athlete	Nation	Time	Notes
1	Maksymilian Szwed	Poland	45.69	Q, PB
2	Markel Fernández	Spain	46.19	Q, PB
3	Isaya Klein Ikkink	Netherlands	46.20	q
4	Ricky Petrucciani	Switzerland	46.79	
5	Omar Elkhatib	Portugal	47.17	
6	Franko Burraj	Albania	49.70	

==== Heat 2 ====
Rank	Athlete	Nation	Time	Notes
1	Jimy Soudril	France	46.19	Q
2	Jonas Phijffers	Netherlands	46.49	Q
3	Alex Haydock-Wilson	Great Britain	46.83	
4	Ericsson Tavares	Portugal	46.88	
5	Šimon Bujna	Slovakia	47.13	
6	Óscar Husillos	Spain	47.95	

==== Heat 3 ====
Rank	Athlete	Nation	Time	Notes
1	João Coelho	Portugal	46.01	Q, SB
2	Håvard Bentdal Ingvaldsen	Norway	46.16	Q, SB
3	Eugene Omalla	Netherlands	46.62	
4	Luca Sito	Italy	46.67	
5	Efekemo Okoro	Great Britain	47.05	
6	Rok Ferlan	Slovenia	47.33	

==== Heat 4 ====
Rank	Athlete	Nation	Time	Notes
1	Iñaki Cañal	Spain	46.10	Q
2	Patrik Simon Enyingi	Hungary	46.24	Q
3	Jonathan Sacoor	Belgium	46.30	q, PB
4	Téo Andant	France	46.32	
5	Lionel Spitz	Switzerland	46.67	SB

==== Heat 5 ====
Rank	Athlete	Nation	Time	Notes
1	Attila Molnár	Hungary	45.86	Q
2	Daniel Segers	Belgium	46.11	Q, PB
3	Oleksandr Pohorilko	Ukraine	46.32	NR
4	Yann Spillmann	France	46.64	
5	Boško Kijanović	Serbia	46.78	

=== Semi-finals ===
The semi-finals were held on 7 March, starting at 20:19 (UTC+1) in the evening. First 3 in each heat (Q) qualified for the semi-finals.

==== Heat 1 ====
Rank	Athlete	Nation	Time	Notes
1	Attila Molnár	Hungary	45.48	Q
2	Jimy Soudril	France	45.99	Q, PB
3	João Coelho	Portugal	46.02	Q
4	Markel Fernández	Spain	46.82	
5	Jonas Phijffers	Netherlands	46.89	
6	Jonathan Sacoor	Belgium	47.25	

==== Heat 2 ====
Rank	Athlete	Nation	Time	Notes
1	Maksymilian Szwed	Poland	45.78	Q
2	Iñaki Cañal	Spain	46.24	Q
3	Isaya Klein Ikkink	Netherlands	46.33	Q
4	Patrik Simon Enyingi	Hungary	46.45	
5	Håvard Bentdal Ingvaldsen	Norway	47.67	
—	Daniel Segers	Belgium	DNF	

=== Final ===
The final was held on 8 March, starting at 21:10 (UTC+1) in the evening.

Rank	Athlete	Nation	Time	Notes
1st place, gold medalist(s)	Attila Molnár	Hungary	45.25	
2nd place, silver medalist(s)	Maksymilian Szwed	Poland	45.31	EU23R, NR
3rd place, bronze medalist(s)	Jimy Soudril	France	45.59	PB
4	Iñaki Cañal	Spain	45.88	
5	Isaya Klein Ikkink	Netherlands	46.20	
6	João Coelho	Portugal	46.46	
