= Keenan Blake =

Dutch hurdler (born 2003)

Personal information
- Born: 17 January 2003 (age 23)

Sport
- Sport: Athletics
- Event: Sprint

Achievements and titles
- Personal bests: 200 m: 20.91 (2025); 400 m: 45.73 (2025)
Medal record
Men's athletics
Representing Netherlands
World Ultimate Championship
Second place	2026 Budapest	Mixed 4 × 400 m relay
European Championships
Bronze medal – third place	2026 Birmingham	4 × 400 m relay

Keenan Blake (born 17 January 2003) is a Dutch sprinter. He won the 200 metres at the 2024 Dutch Indoor Athletics Championships.

== Biography ==
A member of Amsterdam-based athletics club, Phanos, Blake represented the Netherlands in the 4 × 400 metres relay at the 2023 European Athletics U23 Championships in Espoo, Finland. Blake won the 200 metres at the 2024 Dutch Indoor Athletics Championships in Apeldoorn, running 21.12 seconds.

Blake placed third over 400 metres at the 2025 Dutch Indoor Athletics Championships in Apeldoorn, running 47.00 seconds. In May, Blake won the 300 meters convincingly in 32.89 seconds at Ter Specke Bokaal. He was part of the Dutch mixed 4 × 400 metres team which placed sixth at the 2025 European Athletics Team Championships First Division in Madrid, Spain, in June, alongside Nina Franke, Myrte van der Schoot and Jonas Phijffers. The following month, he represented the Netherlands at the 2025 European Athletics U23 Championships in Bergen, Norway.

Blake placed third over 400 metres at the 2026 Dutch Indoor Athletics Championships in Apeldoorn, running 46.20 seconds to finish ahead of Eugene Omalla and Max van der Lugt but behind Jonas Phijffers. He was selected for the 2026 World Athletics Indoor Championships in Poland in March 2026, running in the mixed 4 × 400 metres relay. He also ran in the men's 4 × 400 metres relay on the last day of the championships, as the Dutch team placed fourth in the final.

He was included in the Dutch squad for the 2026 World Athletics Relays in Gaborone, Botswana, running as the men's 4 × 400 m team qualified for the 2027 World Championships.

At the 2026 European Championships, Blake was a member of the Netherlands team which won the bronze medal in the men's 4 × 400 metres relay.
