= Attila Molnár =

Attila Molnár may refer to:

- Attila Molnár (footballer, born 1897) (1897–?), Romanian international footballer
- Attila Molnár (footballer born 1974) (born 1974), Hungarian footballer; see List of Zalaegerszegi TE players
- Attila Molnár (politician) (born 1971), Hungarian politician
- Attila Molnár (runner) (born 2002), Hungarian runner
- Attila Molnár (hurdler) (born 1994), Hungarian hurdler, 21st in 2013 European Athletics Junior Championships – Men's 400 metres hurdles
- Attila Molnar (swimmer), see 1993 European Aquatics Championships
