= Jimy Soudril =

French sprinter (born 1998)

Personal information
- Born: 29 April 1998 (age 28) Laval, France
- Height: 184 cm (6 ft 0 in)
- Weight: 82 kg (181 lb)

Sport
- Country: France
- Sport: Athletics
- Event: Sprint

Achievements and titles
- Personal bests: 400m: 45.99 (Apeldoorn, 2025)
Medal record
Men's athletics
Representing France
European Indoor Championships
Bronze medal – third place	2025 Apeldoorn	400m

Jimy Soudril (born 29 April 1998) is a French sprinter. He became national champion over 400 metres at the French Indoor Athletics Championships in February 2025. He then became the bronze medalist at the 2025 European Athletics Indoor Championships over that distance.

== Biography ==
He grew up in Mayenne but is based in Nantes, where he is a member of Nantes EC. In January 2025, he ran an outright lifetime best of 46.14 for the 400 metres, in Aubiere. In February 2025, he won the 400 metres at the French Indoor Athletics Championships with a time of 46.03 seconds. He was selected for the 2025 European Athletics Indoor Championships. At the Championships in Apeldoorn, he qualified for the final with a 45.99 seconds personal best. He improved again in the final, running 45.59 to win the bronze medal in the event. He was selected for the 2025 World Athletics Indoor Championships in Nanjing, where he ran 47.25 seconds in his qualifying heat and did not progress to the semi-finals.

In an interview with L'Équipe, Soudril said he accepted the decision of team manager Emmanuel Huruguen not to select him for the French 4 x 400 metres relay team in the 2025 Indoor season and admitted that some in the French squad "inevitably have prejudices about me, which I totally understand. I would surely have some if I were in their shoes." On 10 April 2025, he was named in the French team for the 2025 World Athletics Relays in Guangzhou, China in May 2025. He competed at the 2025 World Athletics Relays in China in the Men's 4 × 400 metres relay in May 2025 as the French team finished in fourth place overall.

In August 2026, he competed in the men's 4 × 400 metres relay at the 2026 European Athletics Championships in Birmingham, England.

== Doping violation ==
He received a 2-year suspension for testing positive for clomiphene on 27 February 2022.
