= Ernő Steigerwald =

Hungarian athlete (born 2002)

Personal information
- Nationality: Hungarian
- Born: 28 May 2002 (age 24)

Sport
- Sport: Athletics
- Event: Sprint

Achievements and titles
- Personal best: 400 m: 46.30 (2024)

Ernő Steigerwald (born 28 May 2002) is a Hungarian sprinter who specialises in the 400 metres. He has represented Hungary in multiple championships in the 4 x 400 metres relay.

== Biography ==
Steigerwald gained his first international experience at the 2021 European Athletics U20 Championships in Tallinn, Estonia. In May 2022 in Palafrugell he was part of a Hungarian relay team alongside Zoltán Wahl, Dániel Huller and Attila Molnár which set a national under-23 record in the men's 4×400 metres relay with a time of 3:06.62. The previous U23 national record had been set in 2007. He was a member of the Kopp Békéscsaba Athletic Club, before basing himself in Gödöllő.

Steigerwald was selected for the 2023 World Athletics Championships in Budapest in August 2023, named as part of the relay pool. The following year, he was part of the Hungarian men's 4 x 400 metres relay team which placed eighth at the 2024 European Athletics Championships in Rome, Italy. During the Championships, running alongside Patrik Simon Enyingi, Zoltán Wahl, and Attila Molnár, he was part of the team that reached the final with a new Hungarian national record time of 3:02.09.

Steigerwald was a finalist with the Hungarian mixed 4 x 400 metres team at the 2025 Summer World University Games in Bochum, Germany. He was selected for the 2026 World Athletics Indoor Championships in Toruń, Poland, running as part of the men's 4 x 400 metres relay team on the last day of the championships, as the Hungarian team placed sixth in the final.
