= TJ Tomlyanovich =

American sprinter (born 2003)

Personal information
- Born: April 16, 2003 (age 23)
- Height: 188 cm (6 ft 2 in)
- Weight: 74 kg (163 lb)

Sport
- Country: United States
- Sport: Athletics
- Event: 400 meters

Achievements and titles
- Personal best: 400 m: 45.11 (2026)
Medal record
Men's athletics
Representing the United States
World Indoor Championships
Gold medal – first place	2026 Toruń	4 × 400 m relay

Tony James Tomlyanovich (born April 16, 2003) is an American sprinter. On the 2026 World Indoor Championships men's 4 × 400 me relay, Tomlyanovich won the gold medal by virtue of running for the U.S. team in the heats.

== Career ==
As a prep, Tomlyanovich competed in cross country and track for Cedar Falls High School. He was inspired by seeing Darien Porter break the state record in the 400 m in 2019. In cross country, he was 14th at the Iowa Class 4A state championships in 2020 and ran a 15:55-minute 5K run time.

In April 2021, he held Iowa's top 400 m time. He began making the move from distance to long sprints as a sophomore and was described as a later bloomer with a 6 feet (1.8 m) tall, lanky build. He was selected as the 2021 Drake Relays most outstanding high school boys' performer.

He was named to the 2021 Des Moines Register All-Iowa boys' track and field team and was also a 2021 Clyde Artus Award winner.

Tomlyanovich ran for the Arkansas Razorbacks track and field team in college. In 2024, he broke the school record in the 4 × 400 m with a 2:59.03-minute time. He reached the semi-finals in the 400 m at the 2024 United States Olympic trials but did not make the finals. In 2025, Tomlyanovich ran the second-fastest collegiate time in the nation in the indoor 600 meters.

At the NCAA Division I Men's Indoor Track and Field Championships, Tomlyanovich was 8th in the 2024 4 × 400 m and 8th in the individual 400 m at the 2025 NCAA Division I Indoor Track and Field Championships. Outdoors, his 4 × 400 m relay was runner-up at the 2024 championships and 3rd at the 2025 edition. Tomlyanovich was 9th in the 400 m final and again 3rd in the relay at the 2026 NCAA Division I Outdoor Track and Field Championships.

Tomlyanovich competed unattached during the 2026 indoor season as he was out of indoor eligibility in his fifth collegiate year. At the 2026 USA Indoor Track and Field Championships, Tomlyanovich placed 3rd in the 400 m behind training partners Khaleb McRae and Chris Robinson. He was named to the men's 4 × 400 m relay team at the 2026 World Athletics Indoor Championships, running anchor leg in the first round. Though Tomlyanovich received the baton in the lead, he split 45.98 seconds and finished the race in 3rd, leaving the U.S. to rely on a time qualifier to advance to the finals. He was replaced in the finals, and the U.S. team won the gold medal with a 3:01.52-minute championship record.

== Personal life ==
Tomlyanovich was born on April 16, 2003. He grew up in Cedar Falls, Iowa where his father owned a pizzeria. He attended St. Patrick School and Cedar Falls High School, where he was on the rocket club. He has two younger siblings, Marcus and Kate, who both competed in track and field.

At Arkansas, Tomlyanovich studied finance in real estate. He was the school's first three-time Academic All-America with a 4.0 grade point average in his first semester as a graduate student.
