= 2025 Hungarian Indoor Athletics Championships =

Indoor track and field competition for Hungarian athletes

- Dates: 22–23 February
- Host city: Nyíregyháza, Hungary
- Venue: Nyíregyházi Atlétikai Centrum
- Level: Senior
- Type: Indoor

The 2025 Hungarian Indoor Athletics Championships will be the national indoor track and field competition for Hungarian athletes, and will be held on 22 and 23 February 2025 at Nyíregyházi Atlétikai Centrum, Nyíregyháza. The competition serves as a qualification event for the 2025 European Athletics Indoor Championships, and indirectly for the 2025 World Athletics Indoor Championships shortly afterwards.

== Background ==
The 2025 Hungarian Indoor Athletics Championships will be held on 22 and 23 February 2025 at Nyíregyházi Atlétikai Centrum, Nyíregyháza. In the Hungary, they will be shown online by the M4 Sport.

== Results ==
=== Men ===
Event	Gold		Silver		Bronze	
60 metres	Dominik Illovszky; Budapest Honvéd SE	6.61 PB	Márk Pap; Budapest Honvéd SE	6.79	Dominik Pázmándi; Szolnoki MÁV-SE	6.80
200 metres						
400 metres	Patrik Simon Enyingi; MATE - GEAC	46.25	Zoltán Wahl; TSC-Geotech	46.92	Árpád Kovács; MATE - GEAC	46.95
800 metres						
1500 metres	István Szögi; MTK Budapest	3:44.24	István Palkovits; SVSE (Sopron)	3:46.04	Bence Kardos; A-Plast Ikarus BSE	3:49.46
3000 metres						
5000 metres race walk	Bence Barnabás Venyercsán; Budapest Honvéd SE	19:20.38	Norbert Tóth; H. Szondi SE	20:20.92	Imre Csontos; BEAC	21:28.25
60 metres hurdles						
High jump	Dániel János Jankovics; MTK Budapest	2.19 SB	Péter Bakosi; NYSC (Nyíregyháza)	2.16 SB	Zoltán Vajk Thardi-Veress; A-Plast Ikarus BSE	2.04
Pole vault						
Long jump						
Triple jump	Tibor Galambos; Ferencvárosi TC	15.79 SB	Martin Rivasz; Ferencvárosi TC	15.52 PB	Mátyás Kiss; Ferencvárosi TC	14.36 SB
Shot put	István Fekete; SZVSE (Szeged)	18.57 PB	László Kovács; Győri Atlétikai Club	17.17 SB	Balázs Tóth; NYSC (Nyíregyháza)	16.81
Para 60 Metres						

=== Women ===
Event	Gold		Silver		Bronze	
60 metres	Boglárka Takács; Budapest Honvéd SE	7.21 SB	Jusztina Csóti; Ferencvárosi TC	7.39	Alexa Sulyán; MATE - GEAC	7.41 =PB
200 metres						
400 metres	Zita Szentgyörgyi; MTK Budapest	53.24 U20-NR	Janka Molnár; TSC-Geotech	53.49	Sára Mátó; MATE - GEAC	53.83
800 metres						
1500 metres	Sára Derdák; SVSE (Sopron)	4:33.53	Gréta Barbara Varga; SVSE (Sopron)	4:33.71	Gabriella K. Szabó; NYSC (Nyíregyháza)	4:34.00
3000 metres						
3000 metres race walk	Tiziana Kinga Spiller; Budapest Honvéd SE	13:20.50	Dóra Csörgő; Budapest Honvéd SE	13:40.15	Alexandra Kovács; Békéscsabai AC	13:47.39
60 metres hurdles						
High jump						
Pole vault	Hanga Klekner; DSC-SI (Debrecen)	4.35	Fanni Virág Kováts; MTK Budapest	4.20 PB	Luca Kovács; A-Plast Ikarus BSE	3.90
Long jump	Petra Beáta Bánhidi-Farkas; MTK Budapest	6.27	Bori Rózsahegyi; TSC-Geotech	6.22 SB	Xénia Krizsán; MTK Budapest	6.09 SB
Triple jump						
Shot put	Renáta Beregszászi; SZVSE (Szeged)	16.76	Réka Kling; AC Bonyhád	13.97	Xénia Krizsán; MTK Budapest	13.63 SB
Para 60 Metres						
