= 1988 European Athletics Indoor Championships – Women's 3000 metres =

The women's 3000 metres event at the 1988 European Athletics Indoor Championships was held on 6 March.

== Results ==
Rank	Name	Nationality	Time	Notes
1st place, gold medalist(s)	Elly van Hulst	Netherlands	8:44.50	CR
2nd place, silver medalist(s)	Vera Michallek	West Germany	8:46.97	
3rd place, bronze medalist(s)	Wendy Sly	Great Britain	8:51.04	
4	Zita Ágoston	Hungary	8:55.99	NR
5	Birgit Barth	East Germany	8:56.21	
6	Vanya Stoyanova	Bulgaria	9:07.30	
7	Claudia Borgschulze	West Germany	9:31.42	
