= Jaimie Omalla =

Dutch-Ugandan athlete

Personal information
- Nationality: Dutch
- Born: 5 October 2000 (age 25)

Sport
- Sport: Athletics
- Event: Sprint

Achievements and titles
- Personal bests: 400m: 46.81 (Lubbock, 2024)

Jaimie Omalla (born 5 October 2000) is an Ugandan-Dutch track and field athlete. He holds the African indoor record over 400 metres. From April 2024, he represented the Netherlands.

== Early life ==
He has a twin brother, Eugene, who also competes in athletics. They have an Ugandan father and a Dutch mother. They were born in Zoetermeer and lived in the Netherlands until they were seven years-old before moving to Uganda. They both study at the Kansas State University in the United States. From 2024, they both run under the Netherlands flag, having both previously represented Uganda.

== Career ==
Omalla ran an indoors personal best of 46.81 seconds for the 400 metres in February 2024. He qualified with his Kansas team for the NCAA Indoor Championships in Boston, Massachusetts, in a 4 × 400 m relay team that included his twin brother. They finished third in the relay final to win the bronze medal, alongside Tavon Underwood and Kyle Gayle.

He won his 200 metres heat at the Dutch Indoor Athletics Championships in February 2025, but was disqualified from the final.

Omalla ran 6.77 seconds to place fourth over 60 metres at the Dutch Indoor Athletics Championships in Appeldoorn in February 2026.

Omalla was included in the Dutch squad for the 2026 World Athletics Relays in Gaborone, Botswana, running in the final for the men's 4 x 100 metres relay alongside Taymir Burnet, Onyema Adigida and Elvis Afrifa. He also ran at the championships on the opening leg of the mixed 4 × 100 m relay alongside Minke Bisschops and Nsikak Ekpo. In August, hs fan in the mixed 4 x 100 metres relay at the 2026 European Athletics Championships in Birmingham, England.
