= Csanád Csahóczi =

Hungarian athlete

Personal information
- Nationality: Hungarian
- Born: 23 July 2002 (age 24)

Sport
- Sport: Athletics
- Event: Sprint

Achievements and titles
- Personal bests: 200m: 21.44 (2025); 400m: 46.68 (2025)

Csanád Csahóczi (born 23 July 2002) is a Hungarian sprinter who specialises in races over 400 metres. In 2025, he was part of a Hungarian relay team which set the national record in the men's 4 × 400 metres.

== Biography ==
As a junior athlete for the Keszthely VDSE athletics club in Keszthely, and coached by József Csikós, Csahóczi placed second in the 400 metres run with a personal best of 49.66 at the Hungarian youth national athletics championship in Győr on 19 June 2018. In 2020, he also had a Hungarian league victory at a junior level over 800 metres.

He competed for Hungary in the men's 4 x 400 metres relay at the 2025 Summer World University Games in Bochum, Germany, that summer, running as par in the team which places fourth in the final in July 2025. The following month, he was runner-up to Attila Molnár in the 400 metres at the 2025 Hungarian Athletics Championships in 46.75 seconds in Budapest. He lowered his personal best to 46.68 seconds the following week at the Gyulai István Memorial in Budapest. That month, he was part of a Hungarian 4 × 400 m relay team alongside Patrik Simon Enyingi, Zoltán Wahl and Attila Molnár which set a new national record, the quartet running a time of 3:01.46 on 15 August 2025 at the 2025 Kamila Skolimowska Memorial, part of the 2025 Diamond League, in Chorzów, Poland.

He ran an indoor personal best of 47.43 seconds to place second overall to Balázs Plisz in the 400 metres at the 2026 Hungarian Indoor Championships in Nyíregyháza. He was selected for the 2026 World Athletics Indoor Championships in Toruń, Poland, and ran in the men's 4 x 400 metres relay on the last day of the championships, as the Hungarian team placed sixth in the final. In August 2026, he competed in the men's 4 × 400 metres relay at the 2026 European Athletics Championships in Birmingham, England.
