= 2026 European Athletics Championships – Men's 4 × 400 metres relay =

Men's 4 × 400 metres relay at the 2026 European Athletics Championships
- The final underway
- Venue: Alexander Stadium
- Location: Birmingham, United Kingdom
- Dates: 14 August 2026 (round 1); 16 August 2026 (final)
- Nations: 16
- Winning time: 2:59.16

Medalists
gold medal	Edoardo Scotti; Luca Sito; Mohamed Soudassi; Lorenzo Benati	Italy
silver medal	Matthew Hudson-Smith; Toby Harries; Ben Jefferies; Charles Dobson; Sam Lunt; Malique Smith-Band	Great Britain
bronze medal	Eugene Omalla; Keenan Blake; Terrence Agard; Jonas Phijffers; Liemarvin Bonevacia; Daan Kneppers	Netherlands

The men's 4 × 400 metres relay at the 2026 European Athletics Championships took place over two rounds at the Alexander Stadium in Birmingham, United Kingdom, on 14 and 16 August 2026.

== Background ==
Records before the 2026 European Athletics Championships
Record	Athlete (nation)	Time	Location	Date
World record	United States (Andrew Valmon, Quincy Watts, Butch Reynolds, Michael Johnson)	2:54.29	Stuttgart, Germany	22 August 1993
European record	Great Britain (Alex Haydock-Wilson, Matthew Hudson-Smith, Lewis Davey, Charles Dobson)	2:55.83	Saint-Denis, France	10 August 2024
Championship record	Great Britain (Paul Sanders, Kriss Akabusi John Regis, Roger Black)	2:58.22	Split, Yugoslavia	1 September 1990
World leading	Botswana (Lee Eppie, Letsile Tebogo, Bayapo Ndori, Collen Kebinatshipi)	2:54.57	Gaborone, Botswana	3 May 2026
European leading	Netherlands (Keenan Blake, Eugene Omalla, Tony van Diepen, Jonas Phijffers)	2:58.22	Gaborone, Botswana	2 May 2026

== Qualification ==
For the men's 4 × 400 metres relay, the qualification period is from 1 January 2025 to 26 July 2026. The qualification procedure will be based on the aggregate of the two fastest times achieved by national teams in the qualification period. For being ranked, the results of relay races shall be valid only on condition that they are part of a competition staged in compliance with World Athletics Rules (and included into World Athletics Global Calendar) and that at least 2 international teams, representing at least 2 countries compete in the race. A total of 16 national teams can compete in the event. Host nation Great Britain has the right to be represented with one national team in the event. If they wish to participate and are not qualified as indicated above, the number of national teams to qualify will be reduced to 15.

Qualification standings per 31 July 2026
QP	Country	Athletes	Status	Accumulated times	Result 1	Result 2
1	Great Britain & N.I.		Allocated to Host Country			
2	Belgium		Qualified by European Ranking	5:56.17	2:57.98	2:58.19
3	Netherlands		Qualified by European Ranking	5:58.35	2:58.22	3:00.13
4	Portugal		Qualified by European Ranking	5:58.71	2:59.01	2:59.70
5	France		Qualified by European Ranking	5:59.10	2:58.80	3:00.30
6	Spain		Qualified by European Ranking	6:01.63	3:00.26	3:01.37
7	Switzerland		Qualified by European Ranking	6:02.77	3:01.18	3:01.59
8	Poland		Qualified by European Ranking	6:04.84	3:02.15	3:02.69
9	Germany		Qualified by European Ranking	6:05.04	3:02.21	3:02.83
10	Hungary		Qualified by European Ranking	6:06.01	3:01.46	3:04.55
11	Turkey		Qualified by European Ranking	6:07.44	3:03.04	3:04.40
12	Czech Republic		Qualified by European Ranking	6:08.01	3:03.55	3:04.46
13	Italy		Qualified by European Ranking	6:08.15	3:04.01	3:04.14
14	Denmark		Qualified by European Ranking	6:09.28	3:03.95	3:05.33
15	Ireland		Qualified by European Ranking	6:09.89	3:04.42	3:05.47
16	Slovenia		Qualified by European Ranking	6:10.55	3:04.13	3:06.42

== Schedule ==
Date	Time	Round
14 August 2026	11:05	Round 1
16 August 2026	21:48	Final

All times are local times (UTC+1)

== Results ==
=== Round 1 ===
Round 1 was held on 14 August 2026, at 11:05 in the morning. First 3 in each heat (Q) and the next 2 fastest (q) advanced to the final.

==== Heat 1 ====
Place	Lane	Nation	Athletes	Time	Notes
1	8	Italy	Edoardo Scotti, Luca Sito, Mohamed Soudassi, Lorenzo Benati	2:58.10	Q, CR, EL, NR
2	7	Belgium	Jonathan Sacoor, Dylan Borlée, Julien Watrin, Daniel Segers	2:59.35	Q, SB
3	6	Germany	Thilo Traue, Thorben Finke, Manuel Sanders, Jean Paul Bredau	3:01.07	Q, SB
4	4	Hungary	Árpád Kovács, Balázs Plisz, Csanád Csahóczi, Attila Molnár	3:01.24	q, NR
5	5	Switzerland	Dany Brand, Ricky Petrucciani, Haydn Brotschi, Lionel Spitz	3:01.31	q
6	2	Denmark	Gustav Lundholm Nielsen, Neloo Falck, Jacob Hvorup, Sebastian Monneret	3:02.19	NR
7	3	Portugal	Pedro Afonso, Ericsson Tavares, João Coelho, Omar Elkhatib	3:02.84	
—	9	Slovenia	Maj Janža, Lovro Mesec Košir, Mitja Zubin, Rok Ferlan	DQ	TR24.21

==== Heat 2 ====
Place	Lane	Nation	Athletes	Time	Notes
1	7	Netherlands	Liemarvin Bonevacia, Eugene Omalla, Daan Kneppers, Jonas Phijffers	3:00.98	Q
2	5	Great Britain & N.I.	Sam Lunt, Ben Jefferies, Malique Smith-Band, Matthew Hudson-Smith	3:01.24	Q
3	8	Poland	Remigiusz Zazula, Wiktor Wróbel, Marcin Karolewski, Kajetan Duszynski	3:01.33	Q, SB
4	6	Spain	David García, Ángel González, Juan José de la Rosa, Bernat Erta	3:01.44	
5	3	Ireland	Andre Egan, Jack Raftery, Joe Doody, Sean Doggett	3:01.76	SB
6	2	Turkey	Ihsan Selçuk, Kubilay Ençü, Oguzhan Kaya, Berke Akçam	3:02.96	SB
7	9	Czech Republic	Ondrej Loupal, Ondrej Horácek, Matej Krsek, Milan Šcibráni	3:03.72	
—	4	France	Jimy Soudril, Predea Manounou, Benoît Moudio Priso, Yann Spillmann	DQ	TR17.2.3

=== Final ===
The final was held on 16 August 2026, at 21:48 in the evening.

Place	Lane	Nation	Athletes	Time	Notes
1st place, gold medalist(s)	8	Italy	Edoardo Scotti, Luca Sito, Mohamed Soudassi, Lorenzo Benati	2:59.16	
2nd place, silver medalist(s)	7	Great Britain & N.I.	Matthew Hudson-Smith, Toby Harries, Ben Jefferies, Charles Dobson	2:59.19	SB
3rd place, bronze medalist(s)	5	Netherlands	Eugene Omalla, Keenan Blake, Terrence Agard, Jonas Phijffers	2:59.49	
4	6	Belgium	Jonathan Sacoor, Dylan Borlée, Julien Watrin, Daniel Segers	2:59.51	
5	2	Hungary	Patrik Simon Enyingi, Balázs Plisz, Árpád Kovács, Attila Molnár	2:59.68	NR
6	4	Poland	Maksymilian Szwed, Wiktor Wróbel, Marcin Karolewski, Kajetan Duszynski	3:00.56	SB
7	9	Germany	Thilo Traue, Jean Paul Bredau, Thorben Finke, Florian Kroll	3:02.45	
8	3	Switzerland	Dany Brand, Lionel Spitz, Ricky Petrucciani, Haydn Brotschi	3:02.78	
