= İlyas Çanakçı =

Turkish sprinter (born 2001)

Personal information
- Nationality: TUR
- Born: 7 September 2001 (age 24)
- Education: Anadolu University

Sport
- Sport: Athletics
- Event: 400 metres

Achievements and titles
- Personal best(s): 400 m: 46.24 (2024, indoor) 400 m: 46.48 (2019, outdoor)
Medal record
Men's athletics
Representing Turkey
World University Games
Gold medal – first place	2023 Chengdu	4 × 400 m relay
Bronze medal – third place	2025 Rhine-Ruhr	4 × 400 m relay
Balkan Championships
Gold medal – first place	2021 Istanbul	4 × 400 m relay
Gold medal – first place	2022 Istanbul	400 m
Bronze medal – third place	2022 Istanbul	4 × 400 m relay
European U23 Championships
Silver medal – second place	2023 Espoo	4 × 400 m relay
European Athletics U20 Championships
Gold medal – first place	2019 Borås	4 × 400 m relay
European Athletics U18 Championships
Silver medal – second place	2018 Győr	Swedish relay

İlyas Çanakçı (born 7 September 2001) is a Turkish sprinter. He competed at the 2021 Summer World University Games, winning the gold medal in the men's 4 × 400 m relay event.
