= Balázs Plisz =

Hungarian athlete

Personal information
- Nationality: Hungarian
- Born: 2 October 2004 (age 21)

Sport
- Sport: Athletics
- Event: Sprint

Achievements and titles
- Personal bests: 200m: 21.65 (2025); 400m: 45.37 (2026)

Balázs Plisz (born 2 October 2004) is a Hungarian sprinter. He became Hungarian indoor champion over 400 metres in 2026.

== Biography ==
Plisz won the 400 metres race at the 2025 Budapest Open with an indoor personal best of 48.13 seconds in February 2025. Later that month, Plisz placed fourth overall in a new person best of 47.40 seconds at the Hungarian Indoor Athletics Championships. He was included as part of the Hungarian travelling team as part of the relay pool for the 2025 World Indoor Championships in China.

Plisz broke his personal best for the 400 metres a number of times during the 2025 outdoor season, including a run 46.44 seconds to place second behind Árpád Kovács at the Hungarian U23 Championships which qualified for the 2025 European Athletics U23 Championships in Bergen, Norway. He also competed for Hungary in the 4 x 400 metres relay at the 2025 Summer World University Games in Bochum, Germany, that summer, alongside Csanád Csahóczi, Zoltán Wahl, and Árpád Kovács.

Formerly a member of Pécs VSK, Plisz joined his fellow 400 m runner Zoltán Wahl at Tatabányai Sport Club in January 2026. He won 400 metres at the Nyíregyháza Open indoor athletics competition on 24 January 2026, winning with a time of 47.32 seconds. In February 2026, Plisz ran an indoor personal best time of 46.81 seconds in Nyíregyháza. He ran 47.31 to win the 400 metres title at the 2026 Hungarian Indoor Championships in Nyíregyháza. He was selected for the 2026 World Athletics Indoor Championships in Toruń, Poland.

In July, he won the final of the 400 m at the 2026 Hungarian Championships in Budapest with a time of 45.37 seconds. Competing at the 2026 European Athletics Championships in Birmingham, England, he was part of the Hungary team which ran a new national record 3:01.24 in the preliminary round of the men's 4 × 400 metres relay.
