= David Moulongou =

Canadian hurdler (born 2003)

Personal information
- Born: 11 May 2003 (age 23)

Sport
- Sport: Athletics
- Event: Hurdles

Achievements and titles
- Personal best: 400m hurdles 49.92 (2026)

David Moulongou (born 11 May 2003) is a Canadian hurdler. He won the 2026 Canadian Athletics Championships in the 400 metres hurdles.

== Biography ==
From Ottawa, Moulongou is a member of the Ottawa Lions Track and Field Club and a graduate of the University of Ottawa.

Moulongou opened his 2026 outdoor season with a 50.93 seconds personal best performance in the 400 metres hurdles, breaking his previous best. In May, he also ran a personal best 46.76 seconds in the 400 metres. He ran a new personal best for the 400 metres hurdles of 49.92 seconds in June 2026 at the Royal City Inferno Track and Field Festival in Guelph. He won the Canadian Athletics Championships in the 400 m hurdles that month, running 50.09 seconds. He competed in the 400 metres hurdles at the 2026 Commonwealth Games in Glasgow, Scotland.
