= 2013 European Athletics Junior Championships – Men's 400 metres hurdles =

The men's 400 metres hurdles at the 2013 European Athletics Junior Championships was held in Rieti from 19 to 21 July.

Russian athlete Timofey Chalyy won the gold medal in a championship record. His performance was described as "remarkable". His mark of 49.23 seconds was also the second fastest of any European U20 athlete ever, earning him the European Athletics Rising Star award. It was also a national U20 record for Russia.

== Medalists ==
Gold	Timofey Chalyy (RUS)
Silver	Aleksandr Skorobogatko (RUS)
Bronze	Jacob Paul (GBR)

== Records ==
Prior to the competition, the existing world junior and championship records were as follows.

World Junior Record	Danny Harris (USA)	48.02	Los Angeles, United States	17 June 1984
European Junior Record	Vladimir Budko (Soviet Union)	48.74	Moscow, Soviet Union	18 August 1984
Championship Record	Varg Königsmark (GER)	49.70	Tallinn, Estonia	24 July 2011

== Schedule ==
Date	Round
19 July 2013	Heats
20 July 2013	Semifinals
21 July 2013	Final

== Results ==
Qualification: First 3 in each heat (Q) and 4 best performers (q) advance to the semi-finals. In the semi-finals, first 3 in each heat (Q) and 2 best performers (q) advance to the final.

Men's 400mH Round 1
Place	Athlete	Country	Time	Heat
1	Jacob Paul	Great Britain	50.74	1
2	Timofey Chalyy	Russia	51.19	3
3	Patryk Adamczyk	Poland	51.83	1
4	Aleksandr Skorobogatko	Russia	51.94	2
5	Ben Kiely	Ireland	52.10	2
6	Mattia Contini	Italy	52.42	1
7	Ludvy Vaillant	France	52.52	2
8	Rico Thränert	Germany	52.73	1
9	Timo Roth	Switzerland	52.73	3
10	Francesco Proietti	Italy	52.77	3
11	Marcel Matthäs	Germany	52.81	3
12	Markus Loftås	Norway	53.10	1
13	Pavel Agafonov	Russia	53.16	4
14	Enes Ünsal	Turkey	53.20	1
15	Jonas HANßEN	Germany	53.31	4
16	Valtteri Toimela	Finland	53.49	2
17	Nicolai Hartling	Denmark	53.54	2
18	Zoltán Rády	Hungary	53.62	3
19	Danylo Danylenko	Ukraine	53.63	3
20	Marcin Jabłoński	Poland	53.84	4
21	Attila Molnár	Hungary	54.25	4
22	Joachim Sandberg	Norway	54.65	4
23	Andrea Ercolani Volta	San Marino	57.48	3
	Piotr Szewczyk	Poland	DNF	2
	Roman Olejník	Slovakia	DNF	4

Men's 400mH Semifinal
Place	Athlete	Country	Time	Heat
1	Aleksandr Skorobogatko	Russia	50.12	1
2	Timofey Chalyy	Russia	50.66	1
3	Jacob Paul	Great Britain	51.13	2
4	Ben Kiely	Ireland	51.65	1
5	Patryk Adamczyk	Poland	51.65	2
6	Ludvy Vaillant	France	51.81	2
7	Jonas HANßEN	Germany	51.87	2
8	Pavel Agafonov	Russia	51.88	2
9	Enes Ünsal	Turkey	52.36	2
10	Mattia Contini	Italy	52.36	2
11	Rico Thränert	Germany	52.41	2
12	Marcel Matthäs	Germany	52.47	1
13	Markus Loftås	Norway	52.56	1
14	Francesco Proietti	Italy	53.39	1
15	Timo Roth	Switzerland	53.58	1
16	Marcin Jabłoński	Poland	53.69	1

Men's 400mH
Place	Athlete	Country	Time
1st place, gold medalist(s)	Timofey Chalyy	Russia	49.23
2nd place, silver medalist(s)	Aleksandr Skorobogatko	Russia	50.13
3rd place, bronze medalist(s)	Jacob Paul	Great Britain	50.71
4	Patryk Adamczyk	Poland	50.89
5	Pavel Agafonov	Russia	50.98
6	Ben Kiely	Ireland	51.98
7	Jonas HANßEN	Germany	51.99
8	Ludvy Vaillant	France	52.29
