= Max van der Lugt =

Dutch sprinter (born 1998)

Personal information
- Born: 2 February 1998 (age 28)

Sport
- Sport: Athletics
- Event: Sprint

Achievements and titles
- Personal best: 400m: 46.38 (2025)

Max van der Lugt (born 2 February 1998) is a Dutch sprinter who primarily competes over 400 metres.

== Biography ==
In August 2025, van der Lugt ran a personal best for the 400 metres of 46.38 seconds at IFAM Oordegem in Belgium. In September 2025, van der Lugt switched from Mila Team Amsterdam to Team Sotra.

Van der Lugt was a finalist over 400 metres at the 2026 Dutch Indoor Athletics Championships in Apeldoorn, running an indoor personal best 46.52 seconds. In March 2026, van der Lugt was selected as part of the Dutch team for the 2026 World Athletics Indoor Championships in Toruń, Poland. He ran as part of the Dutch men's 4 x 400 metres relay team which qualified for the final with a time of 3:04.66, competing alongside Eugene Omalla, Liemarvin Bonevacia and Tony van Diepen.

Van der Lugt was named in the Dutch squad for the 2026 World Athletics Relays in Gaborone, Botswana.
