= Patrik Simon Enyingi =

Hungarian athlete (born 2001)

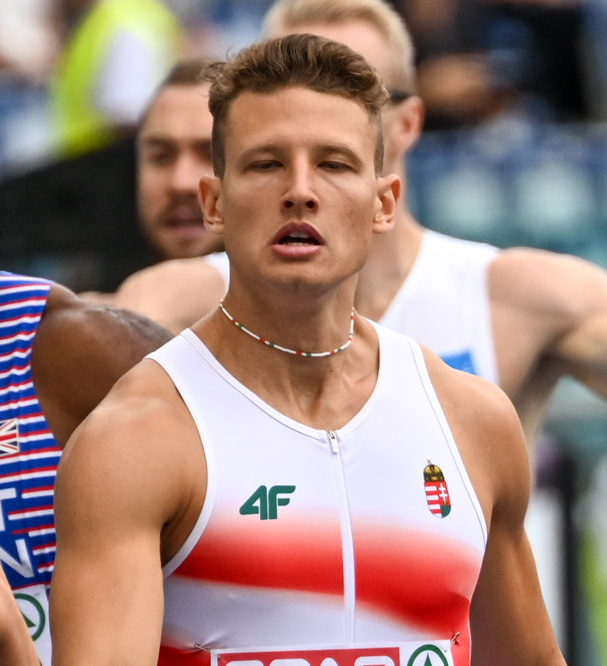
- Enyingi in 2024

Personal information
- Nationality: Hungarian
- Born: 24 January 2001 (age 25)

Sport
- Sport: Athletics
- Event: Sprint

Achievements and titles
- Personal bests: 400m: 44.84 (Madrid, 2025)
Medal record
Men's athletics
Representing Hungary
World Indoor Championships
Bronze medal – third place	2025 Nanjing	4x400 m relay
World University Games
Silver medal – second place	2025 Bochum	400 m

Patrik Simon Enyingi (born 24 January 2001) is a Hungarian sprinter. He won the Hungarian national indoor title over 400 metres in 2025. He was a bronze medalist in the men's 4 x 400 metres relay at the 2025 World Athletics Indoor Championships.

== Biography ==
He ran as part of the Hungarian Mixed 4 × 400 m relay team at the 2024 World Relays Championships in Nassau, Bahamas. He was part of the Hungarian men's relay team alongside Ernő Steigerwald, Zoltán Wahl, and Atilla Molnar, which set a new national record in qualifier for the final of the 4 × 400 m relay at the 2024 European Athletics Championships in Rome.

He won the Hungarian Indoor Athletics Championships in February 2025. He competed in the individual 400 metres at the 2025 European Athletics Indoor Championships in Apeldoorn, Netherlands, where he reached the semi-finals in 46.24 seconds, five hundredths of a second behind his personal best.

He was selected for the 400 metres at the 2025 World Athletics Indoor Championships in Nanjing, China, where he reached the semi-finals of the individual 400 metres. He later won a bronze medal in the men's 4 x 400 metres relay at the Championships, in a new national record time of 3:06.03 alongside Zoltán Wahl, Árpád Kovács and Attila Molnár.

He was selected for the 2025 European Athletics Team Championships, where he ran a personal best and national record 44.84 seconds to finish third in the First Division race. He won a silver medal in the 400 metres at the 2025 World University Games in Germany in July 2025.

He was selected for the Hungarian team for the 2025 World Athletics Championships in Tokyo, Japan. He ran in the heats of the men's 400 metres without advancing to the semi-finals.

Competing at the 2026 European Athletics Championships in Birmingham, England in August, he was a finalist in the 400 metres, placing seventh overall. He also competed in the men's 4 × 400 metres relay at the championships. In September, he competed over 400 m at the inaugural World Ultimate Championship in Budapest.

== Personal life ==
He is from Gödöllő, in Pest County. He is a member of MATE-GEAC athletics club. He has spoken about his use of sports psychology in helping him to learn how to handle racing situations, saying that “you always have to cross the bridge that's in front of you, and then there shouldn't be a problem.”
