= István Szögi =

Hungarian runner

Personal information
- Born: 12 September 1995 (age 31) Tata, Hungary
- Education: Florida State University

Sport
- Sport: Athletics
- Events: 1500 metres, 5000 metres
- College team: Florida State Seminoles
- Club: VEDAC (2011–2017); SVSE (2018–)
- Coached by: Ferenc Reinach; Stupián Tóthné

István Dániel Szögi (born 12 September 1995) is a Hungarian middle- and long-distance runner. He represented his country at the 2021 European Indoor Championships finishing eighth in the 1500 metres. He made his first Olympic appearance in Tokyo in 2021 running in the Men's 1500m event.

Before turning to running he was a competitive kayaker.

== International competitions ==
Year	Competition	Venue	Position	Event	Notes
Representing Hungary
2014	World Junior Championships	Eugene, United States	12th	5000 m	14:11.35
2014	World Junior Championships	Eugene, United States	13th	10,000 m	30:15.93
2015	European U23 Championships	Tallinn, Estonia	16th	5000 m	14:59.72
2017	European U23 Championships	Bydgoszcz, Poland	7th	5000 m	14:18.06
2021	European Indoor Championships	Toruń, Poland	8th	1500 m	3:40.40
2021	Olympic Games	Tokyo, Japan	23rd (h)	1500 m	3:38.79
2022	European Championships	Munich, Germany	23rd (h)	1500 m	3:44.20
2023	World Championships	Budapest, Hungary	32nd (h)	1500 m	3:37.57
2026	World Road Running Championships	Copenhagen, Denmark	37th	Road mile	4:04.98

== Personal bests ==
Outdoor

- 800 metres – 1:47.62 (Pápa 2022)
- 1500 metres – 3:36.63 (Montreuil 2021)
- Mile – 3:56.72 (Cork 2022)
- 3000 metres – 8:25.55 (Budapest 2016)
- 5000 metres – 14:09.88 (Veszprém 2020)
- 10.000 metres – 30:04.34 (Budapest 2014)

Indoor

- 800 metres – 1:47.75 (Budapest 2021)
- 1500 metres – 3:37.55 (Vienna 2021) NR
- One mile – 3:58.00 (Ostrav 2023) NR
- 2000 metres – 5:00.73 (Liévin 2022) NR
- 3000 metres – 7:57.26 (Budapest 2023)
- 5000 metres – 15:40.57 (Bozeman 2016)
