= György Herczeg =

Hungarian athlete

Personal information
- Nationality: Hungarian
- Born: 8 August 2004 (age 22) Budapest

Sport
- Sport: Athletics
- Event: Javelin
- Club: Ferencvárosi Torna Club (FTC)
- Coached by: Miklós Németh (2023-2024), György Herczeg Sr.

Achievements and titles
- Personal best: Javelin 800g: 84.98m (07.26.23) Javelin 700g: 80.44m (10.10.21)
Medal record
Men's athletics
Representing Hungary
European U20 Championships
Gold medal – first place	2023 Jerusalem	Javelin

György Herczeg (born 8 August 2004) is a Hungarian track and field athlete who competes in the javelin throw. On 8 July 2023 he became national champion in the javelin. He competed at the 2024 European Athletics Championships. On 26 July 2023, Herczeg set a new European under-20 javelin record of 84.98m in the Austria Open competition.

== Career ==
As a junior athlete, he competed in Tallinn, Estonia, at the 2021 European Athletics U20 Championships and in Cali, Colombia, at the 2022 World Athletics U20 Championships.

Competing in Leichtathletikarena, Eisenstadt in Austria in July 2023, Herczeg set a new European under-20 javelin record of 84.98m to eclipse the previous best mark of 84.69m from 2011 by Latvian Zigismunds Sirmais. That month he also claimed the senior national javelin title in Budapest defeating Norbert Rivasz-Tóth with a throw of 79.89 metres. In August 2023, he was a gold medalist at the 2023 European Athletics U20 Championships in Jerusalem.

In February 2025, he won the javelin throw at the Hungarian Winter Throwing Championships in Budapest, with a throw of 79.66 metres. In March 2024, he finished ninth at the European Throwing Cup in Leiria, Portugal, with a throw of 73.24 metres. In June 2024, he competed at the 2024 European Athletics Championships in Rome. He threw 65.00 metres in qualifying and did not proceed through to the final. That month, he finished third in the Hungarian Athletics Championships behind Rivasz-Toth and Noel Kovács, with a throw a 68.16 metres.

== Personal life ==
Herczeg was accepted to Corvinus University of Budapest, to study economics and finance-mathematical analysis from September 2023.
