= Wiktor Wróbel =

Polish athlete (born 2005)

Personal information
- Nationality: Polish
- Born: 27 May 2005 (age 21)

Sport
- Sport: Athletics
- Event: Sprint

Achievements and titles
- Personal best: 400 m: 46.76 (2025)
Medal record
Men's athletics
Representing Poland
World University Games
Gold medal – first place	2025 Bochum	4 × 400 m relay
Gold medal – first place	2025 Bochum	Mixed 4 × 400 m

Wiktor Wróbel (born 27 May 2005) is a Polish sprinter, who specialises in the 400 metres.

== Biography ==
A student at Lodz University of Technology, he is coached by Krzysztof Węglarski and is a member of LKS Orkan Ostrzeszów.

Wróbel was a member of the Polish men's 4 x 400 metres team which placed fourth overall at the 2024 World Athletics U20 Championships in Lima, Peru. He won gold medals in the mixed 4 x 400 metres relay and with the polish men's 4 x 400 metres team at the 2025 Summer World University Games in Bochum, Germany.

Wróbel was selected for the relay pool at the 2026 World Athletics Indoor Championships in March 2026 in Toruń, Poland, running in the men's 4 x 400 metres relay. In May, he ran at the 2026 World Athletics Relays in the men's 4 × 400 metres relay in Gaborone, Botswana. In August 2026, he competed in the men's 4 × 400 metres relay at the 2026 European Athletics Championships in Birmingham, England.
