= Marcin Karolewski =

Polish athlete (born 2002)

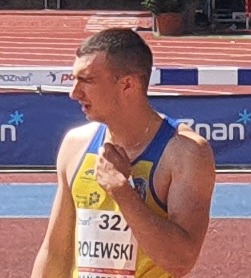
- Karolewski in 2022

Personal information
- Nationality: Polish
- Born: 16 December 2002 (age 23)

Sport
- Sport: Athletics
- Event: Sprint

Achievements and titles
- Personal bests: 400 m: 45.92 (Bochum, 2025)
Medal record
Men's athletics
Representing Poland
World Indoor Championships
| Bronze medal – third place | 2026 Toruń | Mixed 4x400 m |
World University Games
| Gold medal – first place | 2025 Bochum | 4 × 400 m relay |
| Gold medal – first place | 2025 Bochum | Mixed 4 × 400 m |

Marcin Karolewski (born 16 December 2002) is a Polish sprinter. He won a bronze medal at the 2026 World Athletics Indoor Championships in the mixed 4 × 400 metres relay.

== Biography ==
From Ostrów, he is a member of Stal LA Sports Club. In 2020 And 2021, he was Polish under-20 champion over 100 metres and 200 metres, respectively. In 2021, he was selected to train with the senior Polish sprint relay team for the first time.

Karolewski competed for Poland at the 2025 World Athletics Relays in Guangzhou, China, in May 2025. He won gold medals in the mixed 4 x 400 metres relay and with the polish men's 4 x 400 metres team at the 2025 Summer World University Games in Bochum, Germany.

Karolewski was selected for the relay pool at the 2026 World Athletics Indoor Championships in March 2026 in Poland, and was a bronze medalist in the mixed 4 × 400 metres relay on his major championship debut. He also ran in the men's 4 x 400 metres relay on the last day of the championships. In May, he competed for Poland at the 2026 World Athletics Relays in Gaborone, Botswana. In August 2026, he competed in the men's 4 × 400 metres relay at the 2026 European Athletics Championships in Birmingham, England.
