= Árpád Kovács =

Hungarian athlete

Personal information
- Nationality: Hungarian
- Born: 12 September 2005 (age 21)

Sport
- Sport: Athletics
- Event: Sprint

Achievements and titles
- Personal bests: 200m: 21.75 (Budapest, 2023); 400m: 45.97 (Szolnok, 2025)
Medal record
Men's athletics
Representing Hungary
World Indoor Championships
Bronze medal – third place	2025 Nanjing	4x400 m relay
European U18 Championships
Silver medal – second place	2022 Jerusalem	400m

Árpád Kovács (born 12 September 2005) is a Hungarian sprinter. He was a bronze medalist in the men's 4 x 400 metres relay at the 2025 World Athletics Indoor Championships.

== Biography ==
He competed as a member of Szeged VSE (SZVSE) athletics club. He won a silver medal at the 2022 European Athletics U18 Championships over 400 metres.

He competed at the 2023 European Athletics Team Championships in Chorzów, Poland in June 2023. He competed at the European Athletics U20 Championships in Jerusalem, Israel. He was a member of the Hungarian 4 x 400 metres relay team at the 2023 World Athletics Championships in his home championships in Budapest, alongside Ernő Steigerwald, Zoltán Wahl, and Atilla Molnar. The team set a new national record time of 3:02.65.

In March 2024, after being coached by Zoltán Menyhárt for ten years in Szeged, he began to be coached by Zoltán Kovács and became a competitor of MATE-GEAC. He won the 400 metres at the International U20 Match in Brno, Czech Republic in June 2024 in a then personal best time of 46.32 seconds. A year later, he beat this time winning the Hungarian U23 Championship in Szolnok with a time of 45.97 seconds. He finished fourth at the 2024 World Athletics U20 Championships in Lima, Peru in the 400 metres.

He won a bronze medal in the men's 4 x 400 metres relay at the 2025 World Athletics Indoor Championships in Nanjing, China, in a new national record time of 3:06.03. He ran 45.97 seconds to win the Hungarian U23 Championships over 400 metres in July 2025 ahead of Balázs Plisz. He represented Hungary at the 2025 European Athletics U23 Championships in Bergen, Norway. He also competed for Hungary in the 4 x 400 metres relay at the 2025 Summer World University Games in Bochum, Germany.

After interest from a number of American universities he visited Princeton and Harvard and in January 2025, he was accepted to study at Harvard University in Boston, Massachusetts from September 2025. In February 2026, he broke the Harvard indoor record for the 400 metres, running an indoor personal best in Boston of 46.56 seconds. He was selected for the 2026 World Athletics Indoor Championships in Toruń, Poland. He ran in the individual 400 metres, running a time of 46.77 without advancing to the semi-finals. He also ran in the men's 4 x 400 metres relay on the last day of the championships, as the Hungarian team placed sixth in the final. In August 2026, he competed in the men's 4 × 400 metres relay at the 2026 European Athletics Championships in Birmingham, England.

== Personal life ==
He is from Szeged.
