= Eugene Omalla =

Dutch-Ugandan athlete (born 2000)

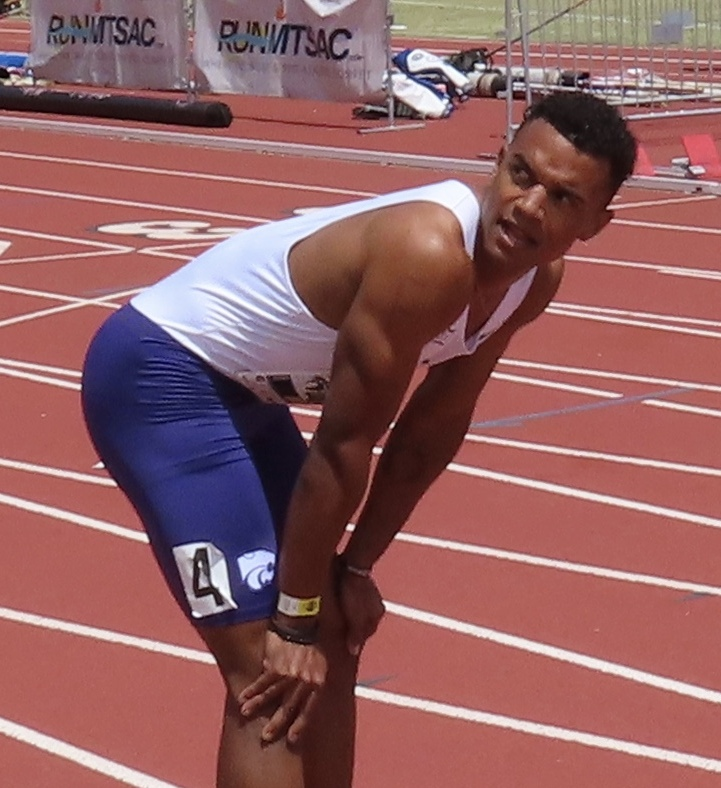
- Omalla in 2024

Personal information
- Nationality: Dutch / Ugandan
- Born: 5 October 2000 (age 25) Zoetermeer, Netherlands
- Height: 6 ft 0 in (183 cm)

Sport
- Sport: Athletics
- Event: Sprints
- College team: Kansas State Wildcats

Achievements and titles
- Personal bests: 400 m: 45.03 (Hengelo, 2026); Indoors; 400 m: 45.18 AR (Lubbock, 2024)
Medal record
Men's athletics
Representing Netherlands
Olympic Games
Gold medal – first place	2024 Paris	4 × 400 m mixed
World Championships
Silver medal – second place	2025 Tokyo	4 × 400 m mixed
European Championships
Bronze medal – third place	2026 Birmingham	4 × 400 m relay
European Indoor Championships
Gold medal – first place	2025 Apeldoorn	4 × 400 m relay

Eugene Omalla (born 5 October 2000) is a Ugandan-Dutch sprinter, who specializes in the 400 metres. He holds the African indoor record over 400 metres. From April 2024, he has represented the Netherlands. He won a gold medal at the 2024 Summer Olympics in the mixed 4 × 400 metres relay.

== Early life ==
He has a twin brother, Jaime Omalla, who also competes in athletics. They have an Ugandan father, Timothy Omalla, and a Dutch mother, Wilma Omalla. They were born in Zoetermeer and lived in the Netherlands until they were seven years old, when they moved to Uganda. They both study at Kansas State University in the United States. Since 2024, they have both run under the Netherlands flag, having both previously represented Uganda.

== Career ==
He ran an outdoors personal best of 46.06 seconds for the 400 metres in May 2023. He ran 45.18 seconds indoors to set a new African continental record for the 400 metres at the Sports Performance Center in Lubbock.

He qualified for the NCAA Indoor Championships in Boston, Massachusetts, to run in the 400 metres and the 4 × 400 m relay, in a team that included his twin brother. He ran a time of 46.37 seconds in the individual event. They finished third in the relay final to win the bronze medal alongside Tavon Underwood and Kyle Gayle.

He ran for the Netherlands for the first time at the 2024 World Relays Championships in Nassau, Bahamas. He competed in the mixed 4 × 400 metres relay at the 2024 Paris Olympics, winning gold with the Dutch team.

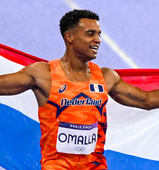
Omalla at the 2024 Olympic Games

He was selected for the 2025 European Athletics Indoor Championships in Apeldoorn where he won the gold medal with the Dutch team in the men's 4 × 400 metres relay. On 22 April 2025, he was named in the Dutch team for the 2025 World Athletics Relays in Guangzhou, China in May 2025.

He competed at the 2025 World Athletics Relays in China in the Mixed 4 × 100 metres relay in May 2025.

He was selected for the Dutch team for the 2025 World Athletics Championships in Tokyo, Japan and ran on the opening day in the mixed 4 × 400 metres relay, and again in the final as the Dutch team won the silver medal behind the United States. He then ran in the heats of the men's 400 metres without advancing to the semi-finals. He also ran at the championships in the men's 4 × 400 metres relay in both the preliminary round and the final.

Omalla ran 46.22 seconds to place fourth over 400 metres at the Dutch Indoor Athletics Championships in Appeldoorn in February 2026. He was selected for the Dutch relay pool at the 2026 World Athletics Indoor Championships in Poland in March 2026. He ran in the men's 4 × 400 metres relay on the last day of the championships, as the Dutch team placed fourth in the final.

Omalla was included in the Dutch squad for the 2026 World Athletics Relays in Gaborone, Botswana, running as the men's 4 × 400 m team qualified for the 2027 World Championships.

Competing at the 2026 European Athletics Championships in Birmingham, England in August, he was a semi-finalist in the 400 metres. At the championships, Omalla was a member of the Netherlands team which won the bronze medal in the men's 4 × 400 metres relay.

== Personal bests ==
Information from his World Athletics profile unless otherwise noted.

Personal best times for individual events
Event	Time in s	Location	Date	Record	Notes
200 metres	20.64	14 July 2024	La Chaux-de-Fonds, Switzerland		(Wind: +0.7 m/s)
300 metres	32.68	28 April 2024	Willemstad, Curaçao		
400 metres	45.04	3 August 2025	Hengelo, Netherlands		
400 metres short track	45.18 i	23 February 2024	Lubbock, Texas, United States	AR	Omalla was representing Uganda/Africa at the time.

== Competition results ==
Information from his World Athletics profile unless otherwise noted.

Achievements in international competitions representing the Netherlands
Year	Competition	Location	Position	Event	Time	Notes
2024	World Athletics Relays	Nassau, Bahamas	12th	4 × 400 m relay	3:03.02	(45.69 split)
2024	Summer Olympics	Paris, France	1st	4 × 400 m mixed	3:07.43	AR (45.26 split)
2025	European Athletics Indoor Championships	Apeldoorn, Netherlands	1st	4 × 400 m relay	3:04.95	(46.46 split)
2026	European Championships	Birmingham, United Kingdom	3rd	4 × 400 m relay	2:59.49	(45.8 split)
