= Attila Molnár (runner) =

Hungarian athlete (born 2002)

Personal information
- Nationality: Hungarian
- Born: 17 January 2002 (age 24)

Sport
- Sport: Athletics
- Event: Sprint

Achievements and titles
- Personal bests: 400 m: 44.47 (Monaco, 2026) NR; Indoor; 400m: 45.01 (Ostrava, 2026) AR
Medal record
Men's athletics
Representing Hungary
World Indoor Championships
Bronze medal – third place	2025 Nanjing	4 × 400 m relay
European Indoor Championships
Gold medal – first place	2025 Apeldoorn	400 m
European U23 Championships
Bronze medal – third place	2023 Espoo	400 m
Youth Olympic Festival
Bronze medal – third place	2019 Baku	400 m

Attila Molnár (born 17 January 2002) is a Hungarian track and field athlete. He set the indoor European record over 400 metres in February 2026. He won the gold medal at that distance at the 2025 European Indoor Championships and a bronze medal at the 2025 World Indoor Championships in the 4 x 400 metres relay.

== Biography ==
Molnar runs for Ferencvaros, he was part of the Hungarian 4 × 400 m relay team at the 2022 European Athletics Championships. Along with Tamás Máté, Dániel Huller, and Zoltán Wahl, he was part of the 4 × 400 m indoor relay team that broke a 23-year-old national record, running 3:08.58 in February 2023.

He set a new Hungarian national record over 400 metres when he ran 44.98 seconds in Limassol in May 2023. He matched this time in July 2023, at the István Memorial in Gyulai. Molnar competed at the 2023 World Athletics Championships in Budapest and lowered his national record in the 400 metres to 44.84 to qualify for the semi-final.

In January 2024, he set a new Hungarian indoor 400 metres record, running 46.22 seconds in Nyíregyháza. Selected for the 2024 World Athletics Indoor Championships in Glasgow, he reached the final of the men's 400 meters with a new national indoor record time of 46.08. In the final he finished in fifth place overall. He ran as part of the Hungarian Mixed 4 × 400 m relay team at the 2024 World Relays Championships in Nassau, Bahamas.

In June 2024, he qualified for the final of the 2024 European Athletics Championships – Men's 400 metres in Rome. He competed at the 2024 Summer Olympics over 400 metres in August 2024.

=== European Indoor champion and record holder ===
He ran 45.66 for the 400 m at the Belgrade Indoor Meeting in January 2025 to lower his Hungarian national indoor record. He lowered it again on 4 February 2025, running 45.08 seconds at the Czech Indoor Gala in Ostrava. That performance was also just 0.03 seconds off the European indoor record held jointly by Karsten Warholm and Thomas Schönlebe. Competing at the 2025 European Athletics Indoor Championships, he was the fastest qualifier for the 400n final, running 45.48 seconds in his semi-final. It was the fastest ever men's 400 m semifinal time at a European Athletics Indoor Championships. He subsequently went faster again to win gold in the final, in a time of 45.25 seconds.

He finished fourth in the individual 400 metres and won a bronze medal in the men's 4 × 400 metres relay at the 2025 World Athletics Indoor Championships in Nanjing, in a new national record time of 3:06.03.

After returning from injury he ran a seasons best 45.28 seconds to win the 400 metres at the 2025 Hungarian Championships in Budapest. He was selected for the Hungarian team for the 2025 World Athletics Championships in Tokyo, Japan, running a personal best 44.55 seconds to qualify for the 400m semi-finals, before placing fifth in his semi-final in 44.94.

Molnar set a new European indoor record of 45.01 seconds for the 400 metres at the Czech Golden Gala in Ostrava on 3 February 2026, breaking the previous record jointly held by Thomas Schonlebe and Karsten Warholm by 0.04 seconds. He ran 20.96 to win the 200 metres title at the 2026 Hungarian Indoor Championships in Nyíregyháza. He was the sixth overall in the final of the 400 metres at the 2026 World Athletics Indoor Championships in Toruń, Poland. In May, he also placed sixth in the 400 metres in the 2026 Diamond League meeting in Rabat. On 16 June, he won the 400 metres in 44.56 at the Golden Spike meeting in Ostrava. In July, he ran a new national record 44.47 seconds at the 2026 Herculis event in Monaco. Competing at the 2026 European Athletics Championships in Birmingham, England in August, he was a finalist in the 400 metres, placing fourth overall. He also competed in the men's 4 × 400 metres relay at the championships, running the fastest final leg with 43.58 seconds. In September 2026, he was selected as part of the Hungary team to compete at the inaugural World Athletics Ultimate Championship in Budapest, running the fastest leg of all competitors in the mixed 4 x 400 metres relay, as the Hungary team placed eighth overall.
