= Zoltán Wahl =

Hungarian athlete

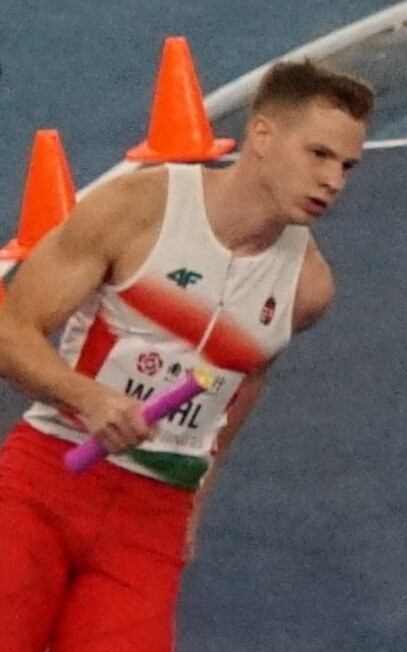
- Wahl at the 2025 World Indoor Championships

Personal information
- Nationality: Hungarian
- Born: 27 April 2000 (age 26)

Sport
- Sport: Athletics
- Event: Sprint

Achievements and titles
- Personal best(s): 200m: 20.90 (Budapest, 2023); 400m: 46.32 (Budapest, 2023)
Medal record
Men's athletics
Representing Hungary
World Indoor Championships
Bronze medal – third place	2025 Nanjing	4x400 m relay

Zoltán Wahl (born 27 April 2000) is a Hungarian track and field athlete who competes as a sprinter. In 2023 he became Hungarian national champion over 200 metres and 400 metres. He was a bronze medalist in the men's 4 x 400 metres relay at the 2025 World Athletics Indoor Championships.

== Biography ==
A member of BMTE athletics club in Budafok, Budapest. Wahl was part of the Hungarian 4 × 400 m relay team at the 2022 European Athletics Championships. Along with Tamás Máté, Dániel Huller, and Attila Molnár, he was part of the 4 × 400 m indoor relay team that broke a 23-year-old national record, running 3:08.58 in February 2023. In 2023, Wahl won the Hungarian U23 title over 400 metres.

He ran a new personal best of 20.92 seconds whilst competing as part of the Hungary team that participated at the 2023 European Team Championships and achieved promotion by winning Division Two. In July 2023, he won the 200m and 400m at the 2023 Hungarian Athletics Championships. He was selected for the 2023 World Athletics Championships in Budapest in August 2023, named in the 200m and 400m individual races, as well as the 4 × 100 m and 4 × 400 m men's relay races, and the 4 × 400 m mixed relay. He improved his personal best by two hundredths in the 200 metres at the Championships heats, running 20.90 seconds.

He won a bronze medal in the men's 4 x 400 metres relay at the 2025 World Athletics Indoor Championships in Nanjing, China, in a new indoor national record time of 3:06.03, alongside Árpád Kovács, Patrik Simon Enyingi and Atilla Molnar.

Wahl was selected for the relay pool at the 2026 World Athletics Indoor Championships in Toruń, Poland. He ran in the men's 4 x 400 metres relay on the last day of the championships, as the Hungarian team placed sixth in the final.

== Personal life ==
He is from Tatabánya in northwestern Hungary.
