= 2025 European Athletics Indoor Championships – Women's 800 metres =

Women's 800 metres at the 2025 European Athletics Indoor Championships
- Venue: Omnisport Apeldoorn
- Location: Apeldoorn, Netherlands
- Dates: 7 March 2025 (round 1); 8 March 2025 (semi-finals); 9 March 2025 (final)
- Competitors: 29 from 19 nations
- Winning time: 2:02.09

Medalists
| gold medal | Anna Wielgosz | Poland |
| silver medal | Clara Liberman | France |
| bronze medal | Anita Horvat | Slovenia |

The women's 800 metres at the 2025 European Athletics Indoor Championships was held on the short track of Omnisport in Apeldoorn, Netherlands, on 7, 8 and 9 March 2025. This was the 38th time the event was contested at the European Athletics Indoor Championships. Athletes can qualify by achieving the entry standard or by their World Athletics Ranking in the event.

Round 1 is scheduled for 7 March during the morning session. The semi-finals are scheduled for 8 March during the evening session. The final is scheduled for 9 March during the evening session.

== Background ==
The women's 800 metres was contested 37 times before 2025, at every previous edition of the European Athletics Indoor Championships (1970–2023). The 2025 European Athletics Indoor Championships will be held in Omnisport Apeldoorn in Apeldoorn, Netherlands. The removable indoor athletics track was retopped for these championships in September 2024.

Jolanda Čeplak is the world and European record holder with a time of 1:55.82, set at the 2002 championships.

Records before the 2025 European Athletics Indoor Championships
| Record | Athlete (nation) | Time (s) | Location | Date |
|---|---|---|---|---|
| World record | Jolanda Čeplak (SLO) | 1:55.82 | Vienna, Austria | 3 March 2002 |
| European record | Jolanda Čeplak (SLO) | 1:55.82 | Vienna, Austria | 3 March 2002 |
| Championship record | Jolanda Čeplak (SLO) | 1:55.82 | Vienna, Austria | 3 March 2002 |
| World leading | Tsige Duguma (ETH) | 1:58.97 | Metz, France | 8 February 2025 |
| European leading | Jemma Reekie (GBR) | 1:59.72 | Metz, France | 8 February 2025 |

== Qualification ==
For the women's 800 metres, the qualification period runs from 25 February 2024 until 23 February 2025. Athletes can qualify by achieving the entry standards of 2:02.00 s indoors or 1:59.00 s outdoor, or by virtue of their World Athletics Ranking for the event. There is a target number of 30 athletes.

== Rounds ==
=== Round 1 ===
Round 1 was held on 7 March, starting at 10:15 (UTC+1) in the morning. First 2 in each heat (Q) and the next 2 by time (q) qualify for the semi-finals.

==== Heat 1 ====
| Rank | Athlete | Nation | Time | Notes |
|---|---|---|---|---|
| 1 | Eveliina Määttänen | Finland | 2:02.73 | Q |
| 2 | Charlotte Dumas | France | 2:02.96 | Q |
| 3 | Erin Wallace | Great Britain | 2:03.38 | |
| 4 | Majtie Kolberg | Germany | 2:03.38 | |
| 5 | Lorea Ibarzabal | Spain | 2:03.50 | |
| 6 | Georgia-Maria Despollari | Greece | 2:03.80 | |

==== Heat 2 ====
| Rank | Athlete | Nation | Time | Notes |
|---|---|---|---|---|
| 1 | Anita Horvat | Slovenia | 2:08.71 | Q |
| 2 | Lore Hoffmann | Switzerland | 2:08.75 | Q |
| 3 | Grace Vans Agnew | Great Britain | 2:08.87 | |
| 4 | Caroline Bredlinger | Austria | 2:08.90 | |
| 5 | Aleksandra Formella | Poland | 2:09.60 | |
| 6 | Bianka Bartha-Kéri | Hungary | 2:09.71 | |

==== Heat 3 ====
| Rank | Athlete | Nation | Time | Notes |
|---|---|---|---|---|
| 1 | Anna Wielgosz | Poland | 2:03.94 | Q |
| 2 | Rachel Pellaud | Switzerland | 2:04.04 | Q |
| 3 | Léna Kandissounon | France | 2:04.86 | |
| 4 | Gabriela Gajanová | Slovakia | 2:04.95 | |
| 5 | Malin Ingeborg Nyfors | Norway | 2:06.98 | |
| 6 | Priscilla van Oorschot | Netherlands | 2:09.07 | |

==== Heat 4 ====
| Rank | Athlete | Nation | Time | Notes |
|---|---|---|---|---|
| 1 | Audrey Werro | Switzerland | 2:00.92 | Q, AU23R |
| 2 | Clara Liberman | France | 2:01.00 | Q, PB |
| 3 | Wilma Nielsen | Sweden | 2:02.68 | q |
| 4 | Daniela García | Spain | 2:02.75 | q |
| — | Annemarie Nissen | Denmark | DNF | |

==== Heat 5 ====
| Rank | Athlete | Nation | Time | Notes |
|---|---|---|---|---|
| 1 | Angelika Sarna | Poland | 2:03.91 | Q |
| 2 | Eloisa Coiro | Italy | 2:04.09 | Q |
| 3 | Gabija Galvydytė | Lithuania | 2:04.18 | |
| 4 | Isabelle Boffey | Great Britain | 2:04.28 | |
| 5 | Marta Mitjans | Spain | 2:05.52 | |
| 6 | Nina Vuković | Croatia | 2:05.94 | |

=== Semi-finals ===
The semi-finals were held on 8 March, starting at 19:53 (UTC+1) in the evening. First 3 in each heat (Q) qualify for the final.

==== Heat 1 ====
| Rank | Athlete | Nation | Time | Notes |
|---|---|---|---|---|
| 1 | Audrey Werro | Switzerland | 2:01.76 | Q |
| 2 | Clara Liberman | France | 2:01.79 | Q |
| 3 | Eloisa Coiro | Italy | 2:02.02 | Q |
| 4 | Daniela García | Spain | 2:02.16 | PB |
| 5 | Angelika Sarna | Poland | 2:02.54 | |
| 6 | Eveliina Määttänen | Finland | 2:03.04 | |

==== Heat 2 ====
| Rank | Athlete | Nation | Time | Notes |
|---|---|---|---|---|
| 1 | Anna Wielgosz | Poland | 2:03.29 | Q |
| 2 | Anita Horvat | Slovenia | 2:03.48 | Q |
| 3 | Rachel Pellaud | Switzerland | 2:03.53 | Q |
| 4 | Wilma Nielsen | Sweden | 2:03.55 | |
| 5 | Lore Hoffmann | Switzerland | 2:03.82 | |
| 6 | Charlotte Dumas | France | 2:05.84 | |

=== Final ===
The final was held on 9 March, starting at 16:33 (UTC+1) in the evening.

| Rank | Athlete | Nation | Time | Notes |
|---|---|---|---|---|
| 1st place, gold medalist(s) | Anna Wielgosz | Poland | 2:02.09 | |
| 2nd place, silver medalist(s) | Clara Liberman | France | 2:02.32 | |
| 3rd place, bronze medalist(s) | Anita Horvat | Slovenia | 2:02.52 | |
| 4 | Eloisa Coiro | Italy | 2:02.59 | |
| 5 | Rachel Pellaud | Switzerland | 2:03.87 | |
| 6 | Audrey Werro | Switzerland | 2:27.37 | |
