= 2023 World Athletics Championships – Women's 800 metres =

Athletics event

Women's 800 metres at the 2023 World Championships
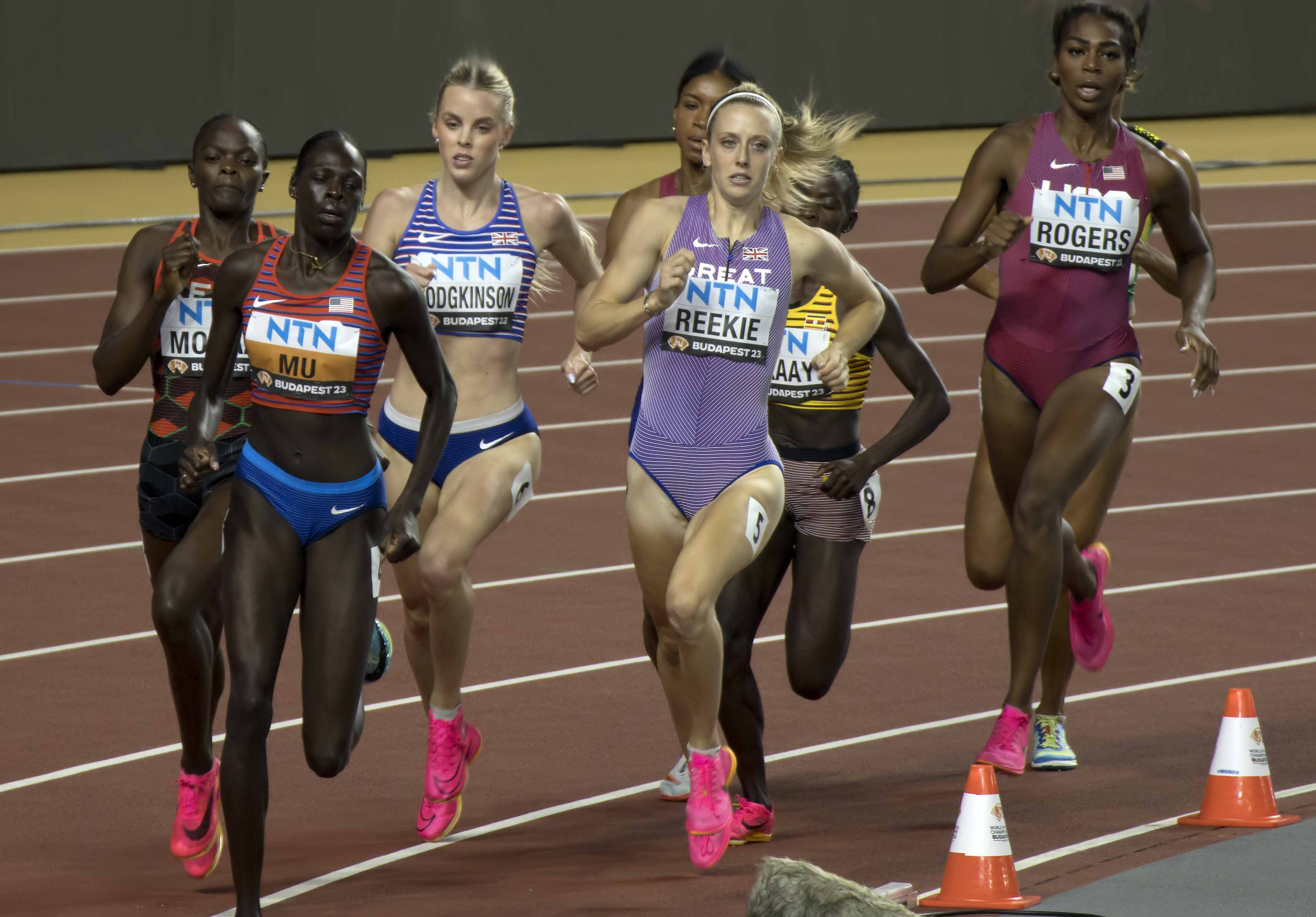
- The final of the event underway.
- Venue: National Athletics Centre
- Dates: 23 August (heats); 25 August (semi-finals); 27 August (final)
- Winning time: 1:56.03

Medalists
gold medal	Mary Moraa	Kenya
silver medal	Keely Hodgkinson	Great Britain
bronze medal	Athing Mu	United States

The women's 800 metres at the 2023 World Athletics Championships was held at the National Athletics Centre in Budapest from 23 to 27 August 2023.

== Summary ==
Featuring the reigning Olympic, World, Commonwealth and European champions, who between them had dominated the global podiums since Tokyo in 2021, the women's 800 metres was one of the most hotly anticipated races of the championships. After winning the 2020 Olympics and 2022 World Championships, Athing Mu started looking for new horizons to conquer. Hurdler Sydney McLaughlin, also training under Bobby Kersee, staked out the 400 metres, so even though Mu was an NCAA Champion, sub-50 performer in that event, Mu focused her season efforts on the longer 1500 metres, only running one 800 metres race before these championships. 2022 silver medalist Keely Hodgkinson, who gave Mu a scare in Eugene, came in as the world leader for 2023; her only defeat, a tactical masterclass from Commonwealth champion Mary Moraa at the Lausanne Diamond League.

Drama ensued in the semi-finals as Mu and Prudence Sekgodiso collided, turning her sideways. After recovering her balance, Mu had to run around five athletes to get back to a qualifying second place behind 2022 bronze medalist Mary Moraa. British number two Jemma Reekie, under a fresh coaching team, impressed in the semi-final to put herself forward as a wild-card medal chance in the final.

In the final, Mu went out fast, first to the break line with Moraa uncharacteristically holding back. She was followed by Hodgkinson, Moraa, and Reekie. Mu was occupying the outside of lane one, taking as much space as possible. The group stayed together as the bell came at a swift but not brutal 56.6. Through the penultimate turn and down the backstretch, Mu tried to get separation, but with her backwards-leaning running style, Moraa would not go away. Hodgkinson and Reekie stayed tucked in close behind to make it a foursome. Having spent most of the race in lane two, coming into the home stretch, Moraa launched her kick, followed by Hodgkinson on the inside. When challenged, Mu had no answer. Moraa passed on the outside, and then Hodgkinson passed on the inside. Moraa continued on to a two-metre victory over Hodgkinson, who had her first major championship victory over Mu, but had to settle for a third consecutive global silver medal. Mu held on to finish two metres behind Hodgkinson for bronze, still six metres ahead of fast-closing Raevyn Rogers, passing Reekie as she had done in Tokyo.

The race was acclaimed as one of the highlights of the championships, reinforcing the emerging and dramatic three-way rivalry between Moraa, Mu and Hodgkinson set to dominate the event for years to come, and acknowledging Reekie as one of the women most likely to bridge the gap to the Big Three.

== Records ==
Before the competition, records were as follows:

Record	Athlete & Nat.	Perf.	Location	Date
World record	Jarmila Kratochvílová (TCH)	1:53.28	Munich, West Germany	26 July 1983
Championship record	Jarmila Kratochvílová (TCH)	1:54.68	Helsinki, Finland	9 August 1983
World Leading	Keely Hodgkinson (GBR)	1:55.77	Paris, France	9 June 2023
African Record	Pamela Jelimo (KEN)	1:54.01	Zürich, Switzerland	29 August 2008
Asian Record	Liu Dong (CHN)	1:55.54	Beijing, China	9 September 1993
North, Central American and Caribbean record	Ana Fidelia Quirot (CUB)	1:54.44	Barcelona, Spain	9 September 1989
South American Record	Letitia Vriesde (SUR)	1:56.68	Gothenburg, Sweden	13 August 1995
European Record	Jarmila Kratochvílová (TCH)	1:53.28	Munich, West Germany	26 July 1983
Oceanian record	Catriona Bisset (AUS)	1:57.78	London, United Kingdom	23 July 2023

== Qualification standard ==
The standard to qualify automatically for entry was 1:59.80.

== Schedule ==
The event schedule, in local time (UTC+2), was as follows:

Date	Time	Round
23 August	10:05	Heats
25 August	20:25	Semi-finals
27 August	20:45	Final

== Results ==
=== Heats ===
The first 3 athletes in each heat (Q) and the next 3 fastest (q) qualified for the semi-finals.

Rank	Heat	Name	Nationality	Time	Notes
1	5	Nia Akins	United States	1:59.19	Q
2	6	Habitam Alemu	Ethiopia	1:59.36	Q
3	6	Catriona Bisset	Australia	1:59.46	Q
4	1	Keely Hodgkinson	Great Britain & N.I.	1:59.53	Q
5	7	Athing Mu	United States	1:59.59	Q
6	7	Natoya Goule	Jamaica	1:59.64	Q
7	4	Halimah Nakaayi	Uganda	1:59.68	Q
8	5	Jemma Reekie	Great Britain & N.I.	1:59.71	Q
9	1	Prudence Sekgodiso	South Africa	1:59.72	Q
10	4	Adelle Tracey	Jamaica	1:59.82	Q, SB
11	2	Mary Moraa	Kenya	1:59.89	Q
12	3	Noélie Yarigo	Benin	1:59.96	Q
13	2	Raevyn Rogers	United States	2:00.06 [.052]	Q
14	3	Christina Hering	Germany	2:00.06 [.053]	Q, PB
15	5	Anita Horvat	Slovenia	2:00.06 [.055]	Q
16	2	Worknesh Mesele	Ethiopia	2:00.13	Q
17	7	Lore Hoffmann	Switzerland	2:00.14	Q, SB
18	5	Bianka Kéri	Hungary	2:00.20	q
19	4	Rénelle Lamote	France	2:00.22	Q
20	3	Abbey Caldwell	Australia	2:00.29	Q
21	2	Jazz Shukla	Canada	2:00.30	q, PB
22	2	Eloisa Coiro	Italy	2:00.36	q
23	2	Gabriela Gajanová	Slovakia	2:00.39	
24	1	Eveliina Määttänen	Finland	2:00.41	Q
25	7	Annemarie Nissen	Denmark	2:00.47	
26	4	Louise Shanahan	Ireland	2:00.66	
27	3	Gabija Galvydytė	Lithuania	2:00.79	
28	3	Léna Kandissounon	France	2:00.81	
29	7	Assia Raziki	Morocco	2:00.91	PB
30	6	Flávia de Lima	Brazil	2:00.92 [.912]	Q, SB
31	2	Daniela García	Spain	2:00.92 [.912]	
32	6	Hedda Hynne	Norway	2:01.00	SB
33	3	Audrey Werro	Switzerland	2:01.03	
34	5	Rachel Pellaud	Switzerland	2:01.05	
35	6	Lorena Martín	Spain	2:01.25	
36	1	Vivian Chebet Kiprotich	Kenya	2:01.26	
37	6	Rose Mary Almanza	Cuba	2:01.33	
38	1	Elena Bellò	Italy	2:01.38	
39	7	Isabelle Boffey	Great Britain & N.I.	2:01.40	
40	6	Majtie Kolberg	Germany	2:01.41 [.401]	
41	3	Naomi Korir	Kenya	2:01.41 [.408]	
42	4	Tigist Girma	Ethiopia	2:01.47	
43	7	Natalіia Krol	Ukraine	2:01.62 [.611]	
44	4	Oratile Nowe	Botswana	2:01.62 [.617]	NR
45	1	Angelika Sarna	Poland	2:01.78	
46	6	Agnès Raharolahy	France	2:01.93	
47	4	Kaela Edwards	United States	2:02.22	
48	5	Olha Lyakhova	Ukraine	2:03.11	
49	2	Margarita Koczanowa	Poland	2:03.23	
50	5	Ellie Sanford	Australia	2:03.55	
51	7	Anna Wielgosz	Poland	2:03.61	
52	3	Madeleine Kelly	Canada	2:04.72	
53	5	Patricia Silva	Portugal	2:05.54	
54	1	Lorea Ibarzabal	Spain	2:06.33	
55	1	Perina Lokure Nakang	Athlete Refugee Team	2:15.84	
-	4	Claudia Mihaela Bobocea	Romania	~~2:00.54~~	DSQ

=== Semi-finals ===
The first 2 athletes in each heat (Q) and the next 2 fastest (q) qualified for the final.

Rank	Heat	Name	Nationality	Time	Notes
1	3	Mary Moraa	Kenya	1:58.48	Q
2	1	Keely Hodgkinson	Great Britain & N.I.	1:58.48	Q
3	1	Nia Akins	United States	1:58.61	Q, PB
4	3	Athing Mu	United States	1:58.78	Q
5	3	Halimah Nakaayi	Uganda	1:58.89	q
6	3	Adelle Tracey	Jamaica	1:58.99	q, PB
7	3	Abbey Caldwell	Australia	1:59.05	
8	1	Noélie Yarigo	Benin	1:59.43	
9	1	Worknesh Mesele	Ethiopia	1:59.54	
10	3	Eloisa Coiro	Italy	1:59.61	PB
11	1	Eveliina Määttänen	Finland	1:59.81	PB
12	1	Catriona Bisset	Australia	1:59.94	
13	3	Jazz Shukla	Canada	2:00.23	PB
14	2	Jemma Reekie	Great Britain & N.I.	2:00.28	Q
15	2	Raevyn Rogers	United States	2:00.47	Q
16	1	Anita Horvat	Slovenia	2:00.54	
17	1	Flávia de Lima	Brazil	2:00.77	SB
18	2	Natoya Goule	Jamaica	2:00.78	
19	2	Habitam Alemu	Ethiopia	2:01.02	
20	2	Lore Hoffmann	Switzerland	2:01.05	
21	2	Rénelle Lamote	France	2:01.25	
22	2	Christina Hering	Germany	2:01.66	
23	2	Bianka Kéri	Hungary	2:01.68	
24	3	Prudence Sekgodiso	South Africa	2:11.68	

=== Final ===
The final was started on 27 August at 20:45.

Rank	Name	Nationality	Time	Notes
1st place, gold medalist(s)	Mary Moraa	Kenya	1:56.03	PB
2nd place, silver medalist(s)	Keely Hodgkinson	Great Britain & N.I.	1:56.34	
3rd place, bronze medalist(s)	Athing Mu	United States	1:56.61	SB
4	Raevyn Rogers	United States	1:57.45	
5	Jemma Reekie	Great Britain & N.I.	1:57.72	
6	Nia Akins	United States	1:57.73	
7	Adelle Tracey	Jamaica	1:58.41	PB
8	Halimah Nakaayi	Uganda	1:59.18	
