= 2026 World Athletics Indoor Championships – Women's 800 metres =

Women's 800 metres at the 2026 World Athletics Indoor Championships
- Venue: Kujawsko-Pomorska Arena Toruń
- Location: Toruń, Poland
- Dates: 20 March 2026 (round 1); 21 March 2026 (semi-finals); 22 March 2026 (final)
- Winning time: 1:55.30 CR

Medalists
gold medal	Keely Hodgkinson	Great Britain
silver medal	Audrey Werro	Switzerland
bronze medal	Addison Wiley	United States

The women's 800 metres at the 2026 World Athletics Indoor Championships was held over three rounds at the Kujawsko-Pomorska Arena Toruń in Toruń, Poland, on 20, 21 and 22 March 2026. This was the 22nd time the event was contested at the World Athletics Indoor Championships. Athletes could qualify by achieving the entry standard or by their World Athletics Ranking in the event.

== Background ==
The women's 800 metres was contested 21 times before 2026, at every previous edition of the World Athletics Indoor Championships.

Records before the 2026 World Athletics Indoor Championships
Record	Athlete (nation)	Time	Location	Date
World record	Keely Hodgkinson (GBR)	1:54.87	Liévin, France	19 February 2026
World lead	Keely Hodgkinson (GBR)	1:54.87	Liévin, France	19 February 2026
Championship record	Ludmila Formanová (CZE)	1:56.90	Maebashi, Japan	7 March 1999

== Qualification ==
For the women's 800 metres, the qualification period ran from 1 November 2025 until 8 March 2026. Athletes could qualify by achieving the entry standard of 2:00.90 s. Athletes could also qualify by virtue of their World Athletics Ranking for the event or by virtue of their World Athletics Indoor Tour wildcard. There is a target number of 30 athletes.

== Results ==
=== Round 1 ===
Round 1 was held on 20 March, starting at 12:51 (UTC+1) in the morning. Qualification: First 2 of each heat (Q) plus 6 fastest times (q) qualify to Semi-Final.

==== Heat 1 ====
Place	Athlete	Nation	Time	Notes
1	Keely Hodgkinson	Great Britain	2:00.32	Q
2	Valentina Rosamilia	Switzerland	2:01.15	Q
3	Nina Vuković	Croatia	2:01.53	
4	Caroline Bredlinger	Austria	2:01.73	
5	Rosemary Longisa	Kenya	2:03.48	PB

==== Heat 2 ====
Place	Athlete	Nation	Time	Notes
1	Pernille Karlsen Antonsen	Norway	2:00.77	Q, NR
2	Natoya Goule-Toppin	Jamaica	2:01.32	Q
3	Rocío Arroyo	Spain	2:01.35	q
4	Alison Andrews-Paul	New Zealand	2:01.46	q
5	Gladys Chepngetich	Kenya	2:02.23	

==== Heat 3 ====
Place	Athlete	Nation	Time	Notes
1	Addison Wiley	United States	2:00.85	Q
2	Hayley Kitching	Australia	2:00.99	Q
3	Charlotte Dumas	France	2:01.46	q
4	Avery Pearson	Canada	2:02.99	
5	Boh Ritchie	New Zealand	2:03.28	
6	Kimberley Ficenec	Czech Republic	2:05.40	

==== Heat 4 ====
Place	Athlete	Nation	Time	Notes
1	Nigist Getachew	Ethiopia	2:02.89	Q
2	Maeve O'Neill	Ireland	2:03.20	Q
3	Maeliss Trapeau	Canada	2:03.78	
4	Kelly-Ann Beckford	Jamaica	2:04.09	
5	Julia Jaguścik	Poland	2:05.40	
	Valery Tobias	United States	DQ	TR17.2.3

==== Heat 5 ====
Place	Athlete	Nation	Time	Notes
1	Audrey Werro	Switzerland	1:59.91	Q
2	Gabriela Gajanová	Slovakia	2:00.08	Q
3	Clara Liberman	France	2:00.43	q
4	Laura Pellicoro	Italy	2:01.99	
	Anita Horvat	Slovenia	DNF	

==== Heat 6 ====
Place	Athlete	Nation	Time	Notes
1	Eloisa Coiro	Italy	1:59.87	Q, SB
2	Anna Wielgosz	Poland	2:00.13	Q
3	Isabelle Boffey	Great Britain	2:00.17	q
4	Lorea Ibarzabal	Spain	2:01.35	q
5	Emma Moore	Ireland	2:02.00	

=== Semi-finals ===
The semi-finals were held on 21 March, starting at 12:22 (UTC+1) in the morning.

==== Semi-final 1 ====
Place	Athlete	Nation	Time	Notes
1	Hayley Kitching	Australia	2:00.06	Q
2	Clara Liberman	France	2:00.28	Q
3	Valentina Rosamilia	Switzerland	2:00.67	
4	Isabelle Boffey	Great Britain	2:01.12	
5	Pernille Karlsen Antonsen	Norway	2:01.67	
6	Maeve O'Neill	Ireland	2:02.46	

==== Semi-final 2 ====
Place	Athlete	Nation	Time	Notes
1	Keely Hodgkinson	Great Britain	1:58.53	Q
2	Addison Wiley	United States	1:58.75	Q, PB
3	Eloisa Coiro	Italy	1:59.33	PB
4	Anna Wielgosz	Poland	2:00.48	
5	Rocío Arroyo	Spain	2:01.14	
6	Alison Andrews-Paul	New Zealand	2:01.38	

==== Semi-final 3 ====
Place	Athlete	Nation	Time	Notes
1	Audrey Werro	Switzerland	1:59.27	Q
2	Nigist Getachew	Ethiopia	1:59.46	Q
3	Gabriela Gajanová	Slovakia	2:00.49	
4	Natoya Goule-Toppin	Jamaica	2:00.69	
5	Lorea Ibarzabal	Spain	2:00.74	
6	Charlotte Dumas	France	2:02.23	

=== Final ===
The final was held on 22 March, starting at 19:53 (UTC+1) in the evening.

Results of the final
Place	Athlete	Nation	Time	Notes
1st place, gold medalist(s)	Keely Hodgkinson	Great Britain	1:55.30	CR
2nd place, silver medalist(s)	Audrey Werro	Switzerland	1:56.64	NR
3rd place, bronze medalist(s)	Addison Wiley	United States	1:58.36	PB
4	Nigist Getachew	Ethiopia	1:59.73	
5	Hayley Kitching	Australia	2:00.50	
6	Clara Liberman	France	2:03.30	
