= Athletics at the 2024 Summer Olympics – Women's 800 metres =

Women's 800 metres at the Games of the XXXIII Olympiad
- Venue: Stade de France, Paris, France
- Dates: 2 August 2024 (heats); 3 August 2024 (repechage round); 4 August 2024 (semi-finals); 5 August 2024 (final)
- Competitors: 50 from 32 nations
- Winning time: 1:56.72

Medalists
1st place, gold medalist(s)		Keely Hodgkinson	Great Britain
2nd place, silver medalist(s)		Tsige Duguma	Ethiopia
3rd place, bronze medalist(s)		Mary Moraa	Kenya

The women's 800 metres at the 2024 Summer Olympics was held in four rounds at the Stade de France in Paris, France, between 2 and 5 August 2024. This was the eighteenth time that the women's 800 metres is contested at the Summer Olympics. A total of 50 athletes from 32 countries participated in this event.

== Summary ==
Athing Mu was the defending champion and 2022 World Champion, but she tripped at the US Trials and couldn't qualify. The 2024 world leader, Keely Hodgkinson had reigned supreme in Europe indoors and out, but took silver at all other major championships since 2020, displaced by Mu in the World Championships of 2022, and in both the 2022 Commonwealth Games and in the 2023 World Championships by Mary Moraa, though the latter had been the first time that Hodgkinson had beaten Mu at a Championship. Most of the remaining players apart from Mu had made it to Paris, but a number, notable Hodgkinson's Great Britain teammate Jemma Reekie, failed to make the final.

Tsige Duguma started the final on the far outside, Lane 9. After reaching the break line, she cut sharply to lane one and the lead. As the other competitors merged, Hodgkinson joined the lead on the outside, with Duguma hugging the rail. Through the second turn Moraa moved in to Hodgkinson's outer shoulder. Coming onto the home stretch the first time, Hodgkinson took the lead, running on the outside of lane 1, Duguma on the inside and Moraa on the outside forming an arrowhead on the front. The three stayed largely in formation at the front until they went down the backstretch when Moraa moved ahead of Duguma and around the turn, up to Hodgkinson's shoulder looking to out-sprint her. Instead, Hodgkinson pulled away from the whole field down the home stretch to victory. Moraa couldn't keep up, but Duguma came back to sprint past Moraa before the finish for silver, with Moraa left with the bronze.

Duguma's silver medal was the first for Ethiopia in the history of the event. Hodgkinson's gold was Great Britain's third gold, after Ann Packer, 60 years before and Kelly Holmes, 20 years previously.

== Background ==
The event was first held in 1928, making it the first distance running event for women. However it was not held again until 1960, since when it has been a permanent fixture.

Global records before the 2024 Summer Olympics
Record	Athlete (nation)	Time (s)	Location	Date
World record	Jarmila Kratochvilova (TCH)	1:53.28	Munich, West Germany	26 July 1983
Olympic record	Nadezdha Olizarenko (URS)	1:53.43	Moscow, Soviet Union	27 July 1980
World leading	Keely Hodgkinson (GBR)	1:54.61	London, United Kingdom	20 July 2024

Area records before the 2024 Summer Olympics
Area record	Athlete (nation)	Time (s)
Africa (records)	Pamela Jelimo (KEN)	1:54.01
Asia (records)	Dong Liu (CHN)	1:55.54
Europe (records)	Jarmila Kratochvilova (TCH)	1:53.28 WR
North America, Central America and Caribbean (records)	Ana Fidelia Quirot (CUB)	1:54:44
Oceania (records)	Catriona Bisset (AUS)	1:57.78
South America (records)	Letitia Vriesde (SUR)	1:56.68

== Qualification ==
For the women's 800 metres event, the qualification period was between 1 July 2023 and 30 June 2024. 48 athletes were able to qualify for the event, with a maximum of three athletes per nation, by running the entry standard of 1:59.30 seconds or faster or by their World Athletics Ranking for this event.

== Results ==
=== Heats ===
The heats were held on 2 August, starting at 19:45 (UTC+2) in the evening. First 3 in each heat (Q) advance to the semi-final, all others (Re) advance to repechage round (except DNS, DNF, DQ).

==== Heat 1 ====
Rank	Athlete	Nation	Time	Notes
1	Jemma Reekie	Great Britain	2:00.00	Q
2	Gabriela Gajanová	Slovakia	2:00.29	Q
3	Juliette Whittaker	United States	2:00.45	Q
4	Valentina Rosamilia	Switzerland	2:00.45	
5	Jazz Shukla	Canada	2:00.80	
6	Léna Kandissounon	France	2:00.97	
7	Habitam Alemu	Ethiopia	2:02.19	
8	Amal Al Roumi	Kuwait	2:11.35	
9	Layla Almasri	Palestine	2:12.21	NR

==== Heat 2 ====
Rank	Athlete	Nation	Time	Notes
1	Daily Cooper Gaspar	Cuba	1:58.88	Q
2	Prudence Sekgodiso	South Africa	1:59.84	Q
3	Rachel Pellaud	Switzerland	2:00.07	Q
4	Halimah Nakaayi	Uganda	2:00.51	
5	Nelly Jepkosgei	Bahrain	2:00.63	
6	Flávia de Lima	Brazil	2:00.73	SB
7	Lorena Martín	Spain	2:02.52	
8	Anna Wielgosz	Poland	2:02.54	

==== Heat 3 ====
Rank	Athlete	Nation	Time	Notes
1	Worknesh Mesele	Ethiopia	1:58.07	Q, PB
2	Rénelle Lamote	France	1:58.59	Q
3	Phoebe Gill	Great Britain	1:58.83	Q
4	Eloisa Coiro	Italy	1:59.19	PB
5	Vivian Chebet Kiprotich	Kenya	1:59.90	
6	Rose Mary Almanza	Cuba	2:00.36	
7	Anita Horvat	Slovenia	2:00.91	
	Assia Raziki	Morocco	DQ	TR17.1.2

==== Heat 4 ====
Rank	Athlete	Nation	Time	Notes
1	Keely Hodgkinson	Great Britain	1:59.31	Q
2	Nia Akins	United States	1:59.67	Q
3	Noélie Yarigo	Benin	1:59.68	Q
4	Eveliina Määttänen	Finland	2:00.02	
5	Majtie Kolberg	Germany	2:00.55	
6	Oratile Nowe	Botswana	2:01.00	
7	Catriona Bisset	Australia	2:01.60	
8	Adelle Tracey	Jamaica	2:03.47	SB
9	Perina Lokure Nakang	Refugee Olympic Team	2:08.20	PB

==== Heat 5 ====
Rank	Athlete	Nation	Time	Notes
1	Tsige Duguma	Ethiopia	1:57.90	Q
2	Mary Moraa	Kenya	1:57.95	Q
3	Shafiqua Maloney	Saint Vincent and the Grenadines	1:58.23	Q, NR
4	Anaïs Bourgoin	France	1:58.47	PB
5	Abbey Caldwell	Australia	1:58.49	SB
6	Lorea Ibarzabal	Spain	2:00.71	
7	Sanu Jallow	The Gambia	2:03.91	NR
8	Gresa Bakraçi	Kosovo	2:13.29	

==== Heat 6 ====
Rank	Athlete	Nation	Time	Notes
1	Natoya Goule-Toppin	Jamaica	1:58.66	Q
2	Claudia Hollingsworth	Australia	1:58.77	Q
3	Lilian Odira	Kenya	1:58.83	Q, PB
4	Gabija Galvydytė	Lithuania	1:59.18	PB
5	Audrey Werro	Switzerland	1:59.38	
6	Allie Wilson	United States	1:59.69	
7	Elena Bellò	Italy	1:59.98	
8	Tharushi Karunarathna	Sri Lanka	2:07.76	

=== Repechage round ===
The repechage round was held on 3 August, starting at 11:10 (UTC+2) in the morning.

==== Heat 1 ====
Rank	Athlete	Nation	Time	Notes
1	Abbey Caldwell	Australia	2:00.07	Q
2	Eloisa Coiro	Italy	2:00.31	
3	Audrey Werro	Switzerland	2:00.62	
4	Gabija Galvydytė	Lithuania	2:00.66	
5	Flávia de Lima	Brazil	2:01.64	
6	Halimah Nakaayi	Uganda	2:02.88	
7	Lorena Martín	Spain	2:03.04	

==== Heat 2 ====
Rank	Athlete	Nation	Time	Notes
1	Anaïs Bourgoin	France	1:59.52	Q
2	Valentina Rosamilia	Switzerland	1:59.65	q
3	Allie Wilson	United States	1:59.73	
4	Anita Horvat	Slovenia	2:00.56	
5	Adelle Tracey	Jamaica	2:03.67	
6	Sanu Jallow	The Gambia	2:04.44	
7	Anna Wielgosz	Poland	2:05.77	
8	Layla Almasri	Palestine	2:16.72	

==== Heat 3 ====
Rank	Athlete	Nation	Time	Notes
1	Rose Mary Almanza	Cuba	2:01.54	Q
2	Jazz Shukla	Canada	2:02.00	
3	Catriona Bisset	Australia	2:02.35	
4	Elena Bellò	Italy	2:02.91	
5	Oratile Nowe	Botswana	2:03.29	
6	Léna Kandissounon	France	2:03.40	
7	Perina Lokure Nakang	Refugee Olympic Team	2:11.33	
	Gresa Bakraçi	Kosovo	DQ	TR17.2.3

==== Heat 4 ====
Rank	Athlete	Nation	Time	Notes
1	Majtie Kolberg	Germany	1:59.08	Q
2	Vivian Chebet Kiprotich	Kenya	1:59.31	q
3	Lorea Ibarzabal	Spain	1:59.81	
4	Eveliina Määttänen	Finland	2:00.38	
5	Nelly Jepkosgei	Bahrain	2:01.12	
6	Habitam Alemu	Ethiopia	2:02.73	
7	Tharushi Karunarathna	Sri Lanka	2:06.66	
8	Amal Al Roumi	Kuwait	2:12.13	

=== Semi-finals ===
The semi-finals were held on 4 August, starting at 20:40 (UTC+2) in the evening. Qualification: First 2 in each heat (Q) and next 2 fastest (q) advance to the final

==== Heat 1 ====
Rank	Athlete	Nation	Time	Notes
1	Mary Moraa	Kenya	1:57.86	Q
2	Worknesh Mesele	Ethiopia	1:58.06	Q, PB
3	Daily Cooper Gaspar	Cuba	1:58.39	PB
4	Phoebe Gill	Great Britain	1:58.47	
5	Abbey Caldwell	Australia	1:58.52	
6	Natoya Goule-Toppin	Jamaica	1:59.14	
7	Valentina Rosamilia	Switzerland	1:59.27	
8	Noélie Yarigo	Benin	2:01.35	

==== Heat 2 ====
Rank	Athlete	Nation	Time	Notes
1	Tsige Duguma	Ethiopia	1:57.47	Q, PB
2	Shafiqua Maloney	Saint Vincent and the Grenadines	1:57.59	Q, NR
3	Juliette Whittaker	United States	1:57.76	q, PB
4	Rénelle Lamote	France	1:57.78	q
5	Jemma Reekie	Great Britain	1:58.01	
6	Gabriela Gajanová	Slovakia	1:58.22	NR
7	Majtie Kolberg	Germany	1:58.52	PB
8	Vivian Chebet Kiprotich	Kenya	1:59.64	

==== Heat 3 ====
Rank	Athlete	Nation	Time	Notes
1	Keely Hodgkinson	Great Britain	1:56.86	Q
2	Prudence Sekgodiso	South Africa	1:57.57	Q
3	Nia Akins	United States	1:58.20	
4	Lilian Odira	Kenya	1:58.53	PB
5	Rose Mary Almanza	Cuba	1:58.73	SB
6	Anaïs Bourgoin	France	1:59.62	
7	Claudia Hollingsworth	Australia	2:01.51	
8	Rachel Pellaud	Switzerland	2:03.36	

=== Final ===
The final was held on 5 August, starting at 21:45 (UTC+2) in the evening.

Rank	Athlete	Nation	Time	Notes
1st place, gold medalist(s)	Keely Hodgkinson	Great Britain	1:56.72	
2nd place, silver medalist(s)	Tsige Duguma	Ethiopia	1:57.15	PB
3rd place, bronze medalist(s)	Mary Moraa	Kenya	1:57.42	
4	Shafiqua Maloney	Saint Vincent and the Grenadines	1:57.66	
5	Rénelle Lamote	France	1:58.19	
6	Worknesh Mesele	Ethiopia	1:58.28	
7	Juliette Whittaker	United States	1:58.50	
8	Prudence Sekgodiso	South Africa	1:58.79	
