= 2023 French Athletics Championships =

- Edition: 135th
- Dates: 28–30 July
- Host city: Albi
- Venue: Stadium Municipal d'Albi
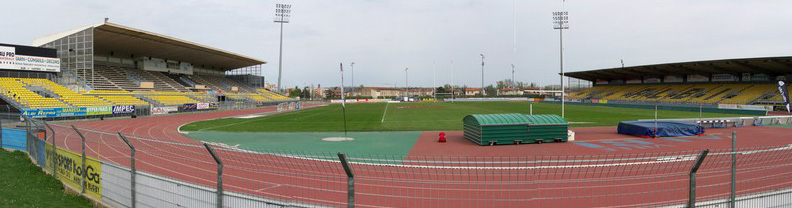
- Events: 38

The 2023 French Athletics Championships was the 135th edition of the national championship in outdoor track and field for France. It was held on 28–30 July at Stadium Municipal d'Albi in Albi. A total of 38 events (divided evenly between the sexes) were contested over the three-day competition.

== Programme ==
Finals	28 July	29 July	30 July
Men	100 m, 5000 m, discus throw, hammer throw, triple jump, decathlon	200 m, 110 m hurdles, 400 m hurdles, 800 m, 3000 m steeple, long jump, high jump, javelin throw, decathlon	400 m, 1500 m, pole vault, shot put, 10,000 m walk
Women	3000 m steeple, 5000 m, discus throw, hammer throw	100 m, 400 m, 1500 m, pole vault, triple jump, shot put, heptathlon	200 m, 800 m, 100 m hurdles, 400 m hurdles, high jump, long jump, javelin throw, 10,000 m walk, heptathlon

== Results ==
=== Men ===
Event	Gold		Silver		Bronze	
100 metres	Mouhamadou Fall	10.14	Ryan Zeze	10.14 PB	Pablo Matéo	10.24
200 metres	Ryan Zeze	20.32	Mouhamadou Fall	20.38	Méba-Mickaël Zeze	20.66
400 metres	Téo Andant	45.60	David Sombé	45.68	Gilles Biron	46.05
800 metres	Gabriel Tual	1:47.84	Yanis Meziane	1:48.02	Thomas Marques de Andrade	1:48.61
1500 metres	Azeddine Habz	3:40.20	Maël Gouyette	3:40.47	Arthur Gervais	3:40.56
5000 metres	Jimmy Gressier	13:23.56 CR	Etienne Daguinos	13:31.78	Fabien Palcau	13:32.57
100 m hurdles	Sasha Zhoya	13.01	Wilhem Belocian	13.07	Just Kwaou-Mathey	13.19
400 m hurdles	Wilfried Happio	48.72	Ludvy Vaillant	48.84	Jordan Terrasse	50.52
3000 m s'chase	Djilali Bedrani	8:24.87	Nicolas-Marie Daru	8:26.53	Yoann Kowal	8:30.46
10,000 m walk	Gabriel Bordier	39:02 PB	Aurélien Quinion	40:16 PB	Kévin Campion	40:24
High jump	Dorian Lairi	2.13 m	Mohammed-Ali Benlahbib	2.13 m	Kristen Biyengui	2.13 m
Pole vault	Thibaut Collet	5.71 m	Baptiste Thiery	5.51 m	Medhi-Amar Rouana	5.31 m
Long jump	Jules Pommery	8.12 m (+2.4 m/s)	Dreyfus Gbadjale	8.04 m (+2.0 m/s) PB	Erwan Konaté	8.02 m (+2.8 m/s)
Triple jump	Jean-Marc Pontvianne	16.75 m (+0.6 m/s)	Enzo Hodebar	16.73 m (-1.1 m/s)	Jonathan Seremes	16.50 m (+1.0 m/s)
Shot put	Fred Moudani-Likibi	19.84 m	Stephen Mailagi	18.51 m	Yann Moisan	18.41 m
Discus throw	Tom Reux	59.88 m	Willy Vicaut	56.39 m	Marc-Alexandre Delin	55.72 m
Hammer throw	Yann Chaussinand	76.84 m	Enguerrand Decroix-Têtu	73.76 m	Jean-Baptiste Bruxelle	70.51 m
Javelin throw	Rémi Conroy	77.50 m	Lukas Moutarde	77.23 m	Teuraiterai Tupaia	76.24 m
Decathlon	Makenson Gletty	8279 pts PB	Arthur Prevost	7609 pts	Matthieu Gudet	7559 pts PB

=== Women ===
Event	Gold		Silver		Bronze	
100 metres	Mallory Leconte	11.23 PB	Cynthia Leduc	11.32	Hélène Parisot	11.35 PB
200 metres	Paméra Losange	23.25	Helène Parisot	23.45	Diane Iscaye	23.50
400 metres	Amandine Brossier	52.53	Estelle Raffai	53.09	Léa Thery	53.46
800 metres	Léna Kandissounon	2:02.00	Clara Liberman	2:02.55	Anaïs Bourgoin	2:02.56
1500 metres	Agathe Guillemot	4:22.69	Charlotte Mouchet	4:23.29	Katia Delarche	4:23.60
5000 metres	Manon Trapp	15:49.12	Méline Rollin	16:20.69	Alessia Zarbo	16:22.18
110 m hurdles	Cyréna Samba-Mayela	12.68 PB	Laëticia Bapté	12.69 PB	Awa Sene	13.11
400 m hurdles	Louise Maraval	55.85	Camille Séri	56.00	Méghane Grandson	57.36 PB
3000 m s'chase	Alice Finot	9:54.60	Flavie Renouard	9:55.51	Asénath Etile	10:00.66 PB
10,000 m walk	Pauline Stey	44:42 PB CR	Clémence Beretta	45:38	Camille Moutard	46:25
High jump	Solène Gicquel	1.89 m	Nawal Meniker	1.87 m	Juliette Perez	1.85 m
Pole vault	Margot Chevrier	4.61 m	Ninon Chapelle	4.51 m	Elina Giallurachis	4.21 m
Long jump	Rougui Sow	6.70 m (+6.3 m/s)	Éloyse Lesueur-Aymonin	6.49 m (+2.5 m/s)	Angelica Berriot	6.41 m (+1.8 m/s)
Triple jump	Anne-Suzanna Fosther-Katta	13.80 m (+2.0 m/s)	Ilionis Guillaume	13.63 m (+0.6 m/s)	Jeanine Assani Issouf	13.18 m (+0.9 m/s)
Shot put	Christine Gavarin	15.49 m	Naomie Wuta	15.29 m	Alexandra Aubry	14.25 m
Discus throw	Mélina Robert-Michon	62.69 m	Marie-Josée Bovele-Linaka	55.41 m PB	Yelena Mokoka	53.50 m PB
Hammer throw	Alexandra Tavernier	70.80 m	Xena Ngomakete	67.49 m	Rose Loga	66.71 m
Javelin throw	Jöna Aigouy	58.12 m PB	Alizée Minard	57.34 m	Jade Maraval	52.18 m
Heptathlon	Esther Turpin	6182 pts	Auriana Lazraq-Khlass	6153 pts	Élisa Pineau	6027 pts
