= Clara Liberman =

French athlete (born 2000)

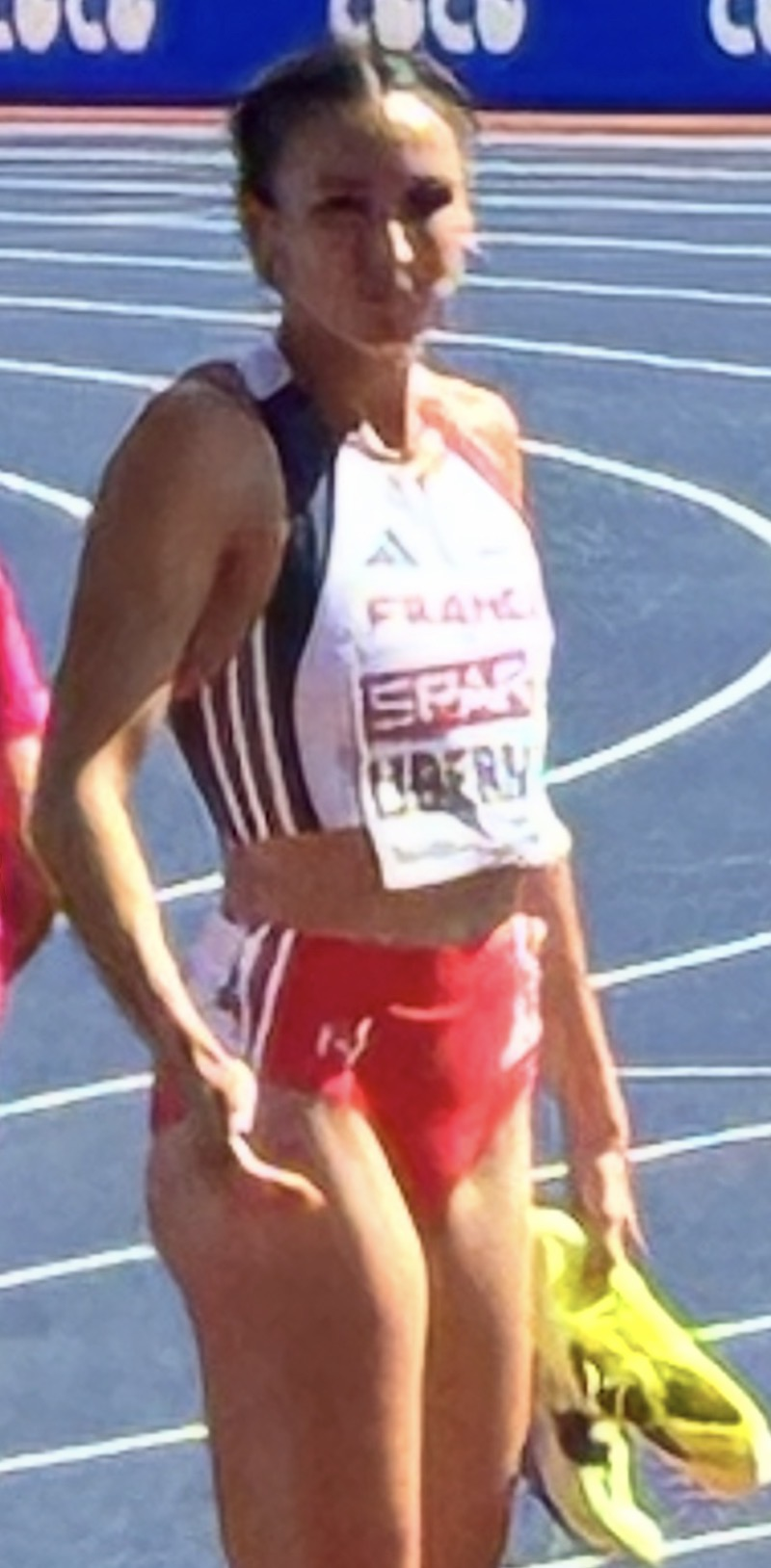
- Liberman in 2026

Personal information
- Born: 5 March 2000 (age 26) Gonesse, France
- Height: 171 cm (5 ft 7 in)
- Weight: 59 kg (130 lb)

Sport
- Country: France
- Sport: Athletics
- Event: Middle-distance running

Achievements and titles
- Personal bests: 800m: 1:58.19 (Birmingham, 2026); 1500m: 4:09.43 (Lyon, 2025)
Medal record
Women's athletics
Representing France
European Indoor Championships
| Silver medal – second place | 2025 Apeldoorn | 800 m |

Clara Liberman (born 5 April 2000) is a French middle-distance runner. In 2025, she became French indoor champion and European Indoor Championships silver medalist over 800 metres.

== Biography ==
In 2021, she joined the Marc Reuzé training group at Haute Bretagne Athlétisme in Rennes, which included French internationals Léna Kandissounon and Agathe Guillemot. In 2022, she became the 2022 French U23 champion over 1500 metres. At the 2023 French Athletics Championships, she was runner-up in the 800 metres in 2:02.54, behind Kandissounon, but ahead of Anaïs Bourgoin.

In February 2024, she won the bronze medal at the 2024 French Indoor Athletics Championships in Miramas, running 2:03.07 to finish behind Bourgoin and Kandissounon. In June 2024, she acted as a pacemaker to help her club teammate Agathe Guillemot achieve the automatic qualifying time for the 2024 Paris Olympics in the 1500 metres. Later that month, she finished third over 800 metres at the French Athletics Championship in Angers. In July 2024, she set a personal best 2:00.16 for the 800 metres whilst running in Rouen.

In January 2025, she set a new indoor personal best for the 800 metres, running a time of 2:01.56 at the Meeting de Nantes Metropole, a World Athletics Indoor Tour Bronze event, in Nantes, France. The following month, she won her first French national title winning over that distance at the 2025 French Indoor Athletics Championships in Miramas, ahead of Charlotte Dumas. She was subsequently selected for the 2025 European Athletics Indoor Championships in Appeldoorn, Netherlands where she qualified for the final of the 800 metres. She won a silver medal in the final, in a time of 2:02.32 on what was her senior major championships debut for France.

She set a new personal best at the 2025 Kamila Skolimowska Memorial, in Poland, part of the 2025 Diamond League, with a run of 1:58.82 for the 800 metres. She was a semi-finalist in the women's 800 metres at the 2025 World Athletics Championships in Tokyo, Japan.

Competing at the Meeting de l’Eure in Val-de-Reuil, a World Athletics Indoor Tour Silver meeting on 1 February 2026, Liberman ran an indoors personal best of 2:00.42 to place second behind Audrey Werro. That month, she improved her indoors personal best to 1:59.50 for the 800 metres at the Copernicus Cup in Toruń, Poland, on 22 February 2026. She reached the final of the 800 m at the 2026 World Athletics Indoor Championships in Toruń, placing sixth overall.

In June, Liberman ran a personal best 1:58.69 for the 800 metres at the FBK Games in Hengelo. She set a new personal best in the 800 m with 1:58.34 on 28 June at the 2026 Meeting de Paris. In July, she won the 800m in 1:58.90 at the Meeting Stanislas Nancy in France. On 26 July, Liberman placed second in the 800 m in 1:58.82 at the French Championships in Albi. Competing at the European Championships in August, in Birmingham, England, she was a finalist in the 800 metres, having ran a personal best of 1:58.19 in the semi-final, prior to placing tenth overall in the final.
