= 2026 European Athletics Championships – Women's 800 metres =

Women's 800 metres at the 2026 European Athletics Championships
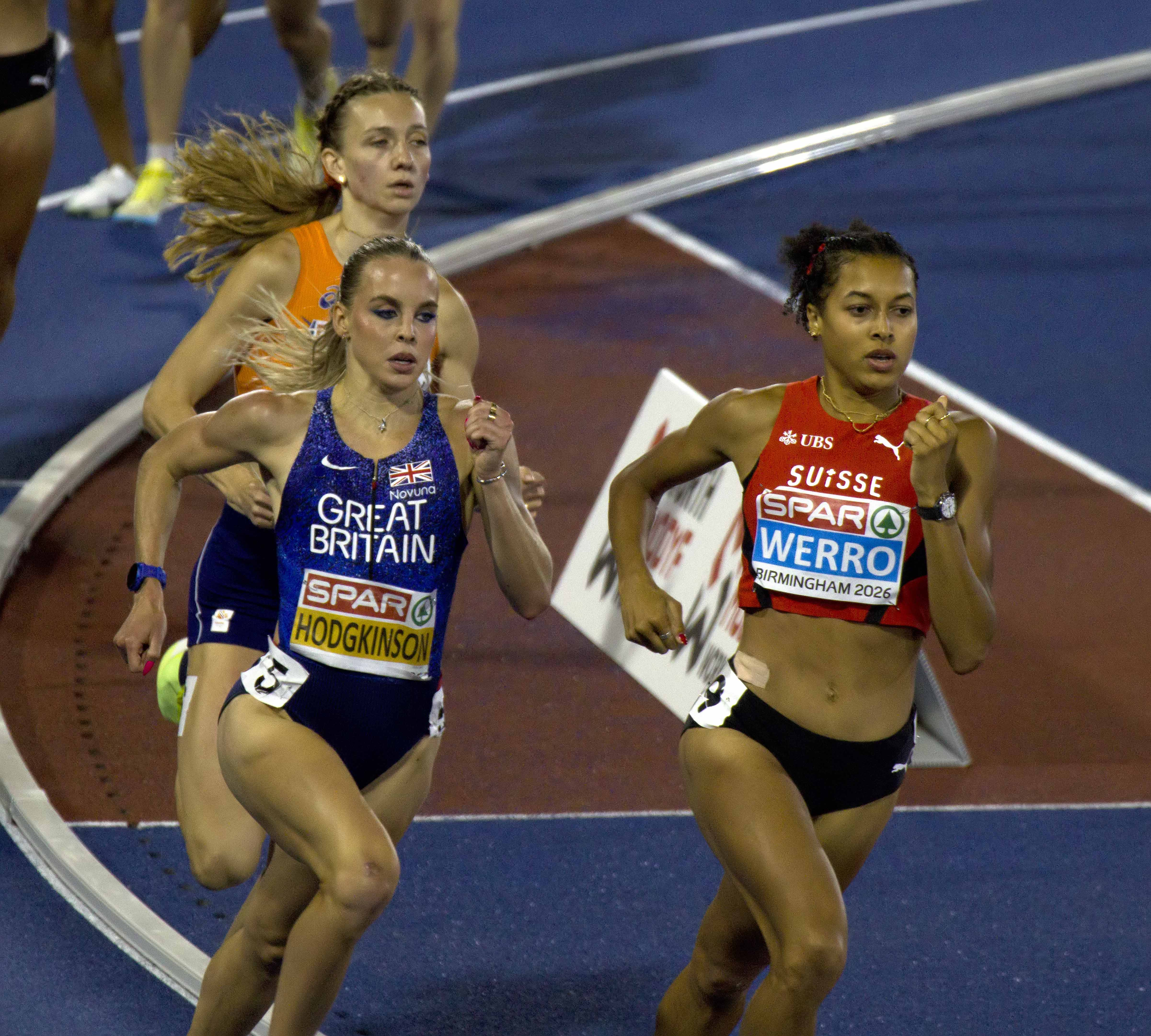
- Medalists Audrey Werro (right), Keely Hodgkinson (left front), and Femke Broeders-Bol (left back) in the final
- Venue: Alexander Stadium
- Location: Birmingham, United Kingdom
- Dates: 11 August 2026 (round 1); 13 August 2026 (semi-finals); 14 August 2026 (final)
- Competitors: 31 from 18 nations
- Winning time: 1:54.81 CR

Medalists
gold medal	Audrey Werro	Switzerland
silver medal	Keely Hodgkinson	Great Britain
bronze medal	Femke Broeders-Bol	Netherlands

The women's 800 metres at the 2026 European Athletics Championships took place over three rounds at the Alexander Stadium in Birmingham, United Kingdom, from 11 to 14 August 2026. It was the twenty-third time the event was contested at the European Athletics Championships. Athletes could qualify by running the entry standard of 1:59.80 min or faster, by wildcard, or by their world ranking.

Thirty-one athletes from eighteen nations competed in round 1, where sixteen advanced to the semi-finals. Eloisa Coiro of Italy set a Italian record of 1:57.56 min and Georgia-Maria Despollari of Greece set a Greek record of 1:59.29 min. In the semi-finals, Audrey Werro of Switzerland and Gabija Galvydytė of Lithuania fell, but were advanced by referee decision so that ten athletes qualified for the final.

The final was one of the most anticipated races of these championships with the three fastest 800 m athletes of the year, all ending up on the podium. It was won by Werro in a new championship record of 1:54.81 min, ahead of defending champion Keely Hodgkinson of Great Britain and Northern Ireland in 1:55.01 min in second place and Femke Broeders-Bol of the Netherlands equalling the Dutch record of 1:55.54 min in third place.

== Background ==
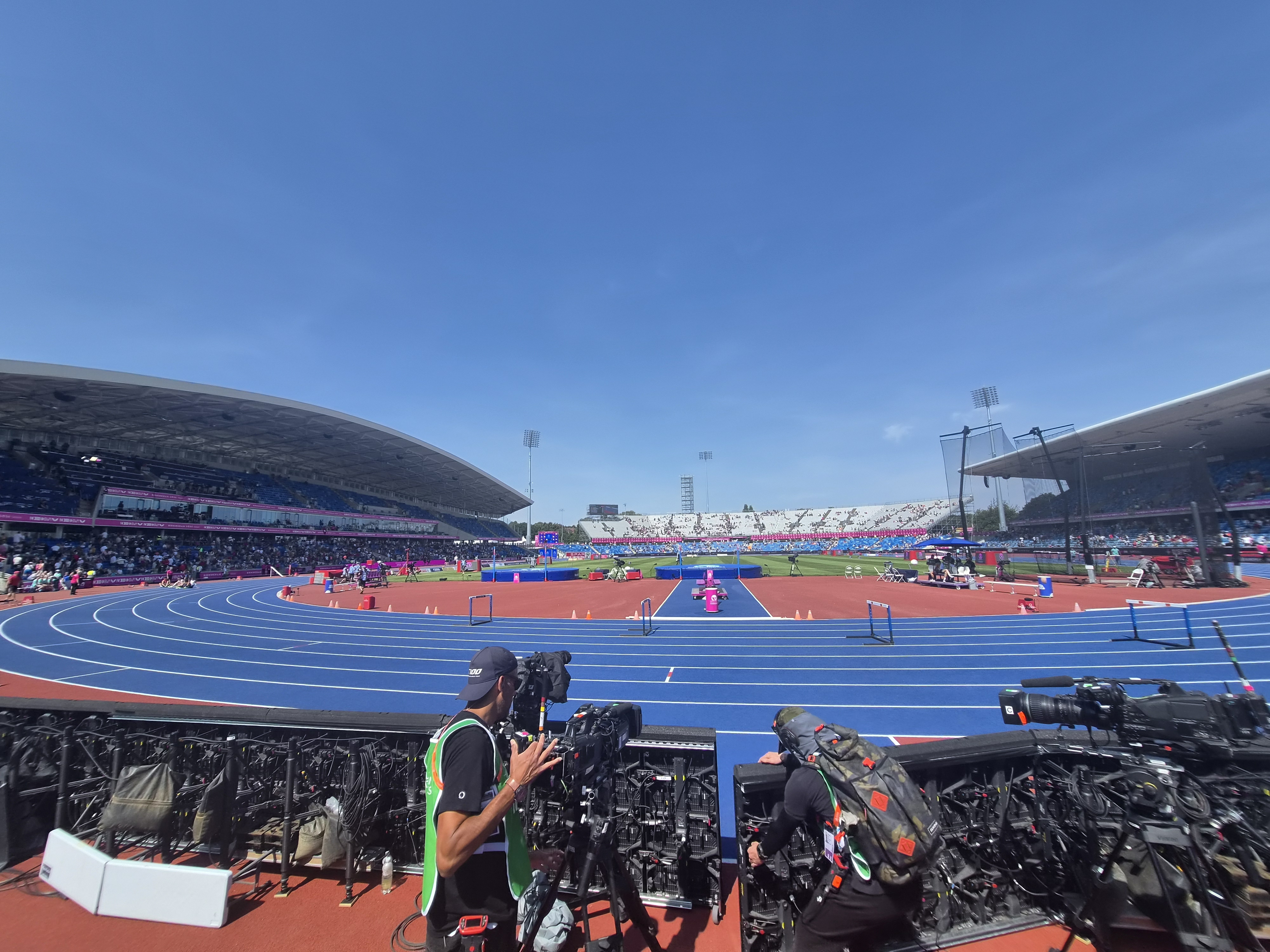
Alexander Stadium on 11 August 2026

In the 800 metres, athletes run two laps on a 400-metre track, starting in separate lanes and breaking for the inside lanes after the first bend. At the European Athletics Championships, the women's 800 metres was introduced in 1954 and had been contested twenty-two times before 2026. At the 2026 European Athletics Championships, the track and field events were held at the Alexander Stadium in Birmingham, United Kingdom.

At the start of the championships, the world and European record was 1:53.28 min set by Jarmila Kratochvílová of Czechoslovakia in 1983 and the championship record was 1:55.41 min set by Olga Mineyeva of the Soviet Union in 1982. The world and European leading performance of the 2026 season was 1:53.80 min ran by Audrey Werro of Switzerland at the 2026 Meeting de Paris on 28 June 2026. Keely Hodgkinson of Great Britain and Northern Ireland was the defending champion after winning in 1:58.65 min at 2024 European Athletics Championships.

Records before the 2026 European Athletics Championships
Record	Athlete (nation)	Time	Location	Date
World record	Jarmila Kratochvílová (TCH)	1:53.28	Munich, West Germany	26 July 1983
European record	Jarmila Kratochvílová (TCH)	1:53.28	Munich, West Germany	26 July 1983
Championship record	Olga Mineyeva (URS)	1:55.41	Athens, Greece	8 September 1982
World leading	Audrey Werro (SWI)	1:53.80	Paris, France	28 June 2026
European leading	Audrey Werro (SWI)	1:53.80	Paris, France	28 June 2026

== Qualification ==
For the women's 800 metres, athletes could qualify by running the entry standard of 1:59.80 min or faster during the qualification period from 27 July 2025 to 26 July 2026, by wildcard for the 2024 European Athletics Champion, or by their position on the World Athletics Rankings for the event on 26 July 2026. The target number was thirty-two athletes. A final entry list with thirty-four athletes from eighteen nations was published on 31 July 2026. Keely Hodgkinson of Great Britain and Northern Ireland qualified by wild card, twenty-six athletes qualified by the entry standard, and the rest qualified by their world ranking.

== Results ==
=== Round 1 ===
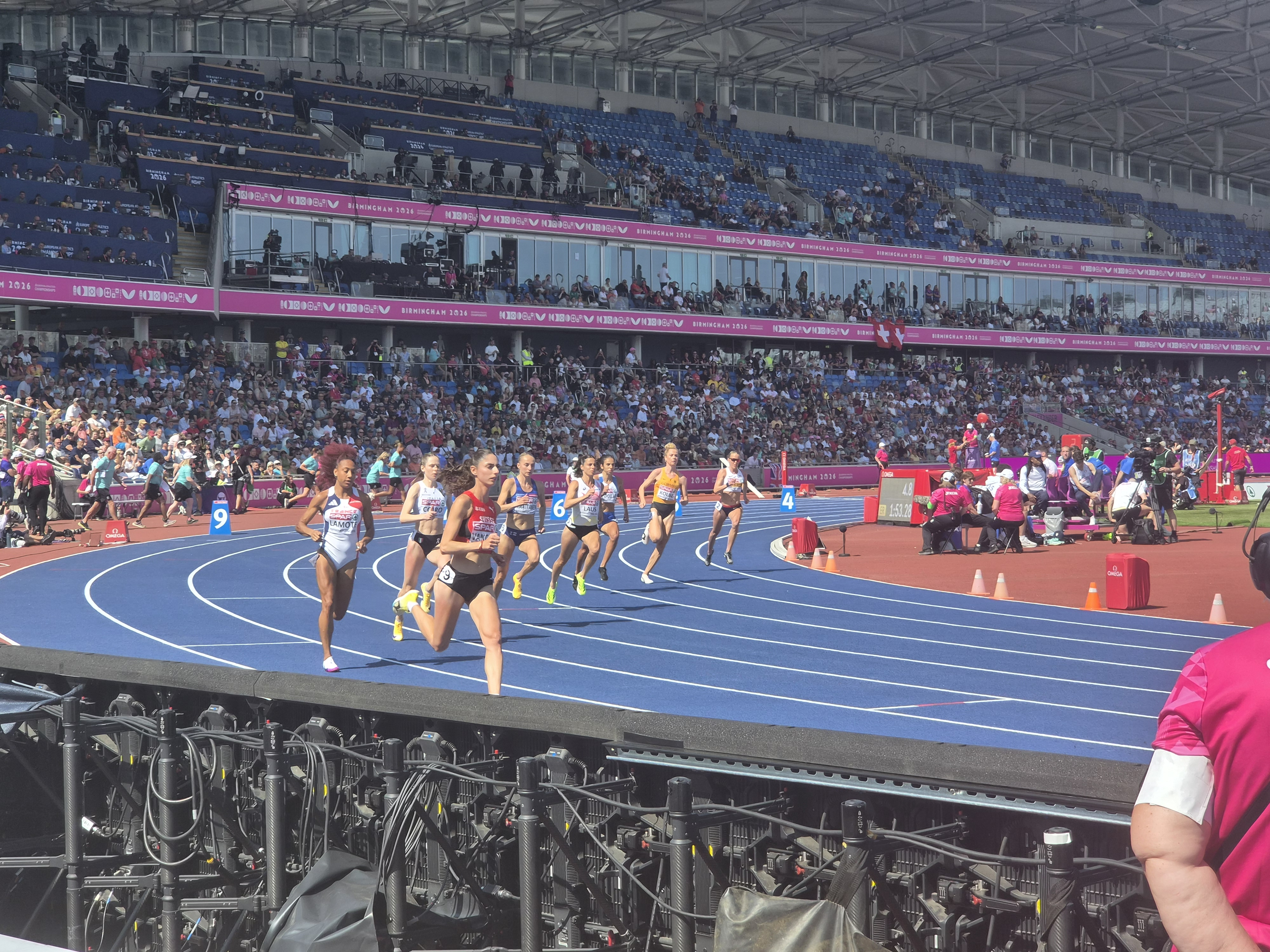
First heat of round 1 with Keely Hodgkinson (right) of Great Britain & N.I.
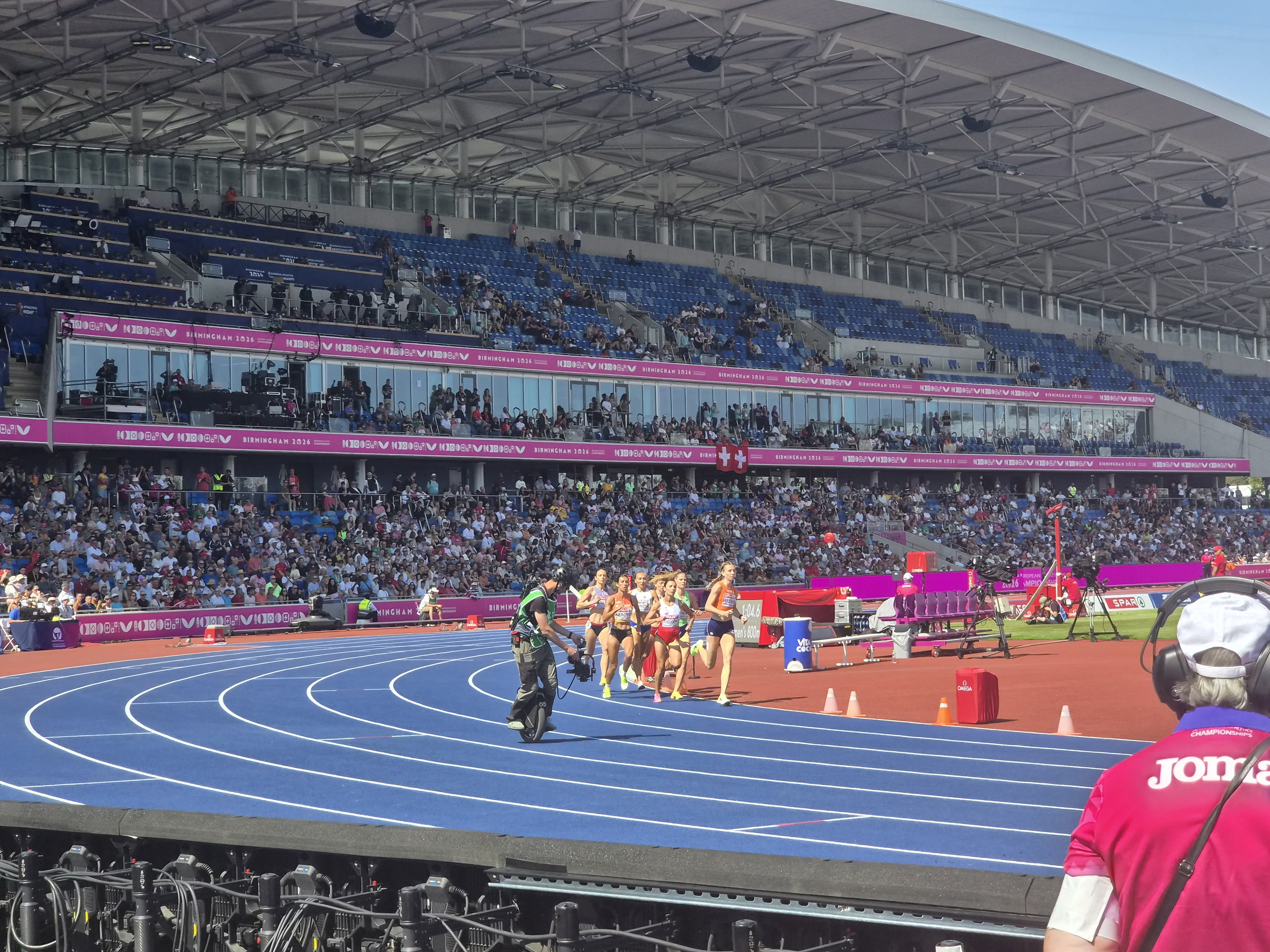
Second heat of round 1 with Femke Broeders-Bol (right) of the Netherlands

On 11 August, thirty-one athletes from eighteen nations competed in the four heats of the first round, starting at 12:05 (UTC+1). Sixteen athletes, the first three in each heat (Q) and the next four fastest overall (q), qualified for the semi-finals. In the first heat, Eloisa Coiro of Italy set a national record (NR) of 1:57.56 min, Smilla Kolbe of Germany ran a personal best (PB) of 1:57.80 min, and Veronica Vancardo of Switzerland ran a personal best of 1:58.20 min, each qualifying for the semi-finals; Georgia-Maria Despollari of Greece set a national record (NR) of 1:59.29 min and Camille Laus of Belgium ran a personal best of 1:59.43 min, but they didn't advance to the next round. In the second heat, Majtie Kolberg of Germany did not finish (DNF) the race due to a hip injury. In the third heat, Clara Liberman of France, Nina Vuković of Croatia, and Marta Mitjans of Spain ran personal bests of 1:58.23 min, 1:58.38 min and 1:58.52 min respectively and qualified for the semi-finals; Jana Marie Becker of Germany ran a personal best of 1:59.08 min and Amanda Marie Frøynes of Norway ran a personal best of 1:59.09 min, but they did not advance.

Results of round 1
Rank	Heat	Lane	Name	Nation	Time	Note
1	1	2	Keely Hodgkinson	Great Britain & N.I.	1:57.28	Q
2	1	7	Eloisa Coiro	Italy	1:57.56	Q, NR
3	1	3	Smilla Kolbe	Germany	1:57.80	Q, PB
4	3	3	Audrey Werro	Switzerland	1:57.83	Q
5	1	9	Veronica Vancardo	Switzerland	1:58.20	q, PB
6	3	7	Clara Liberman	France	1:58.23	Q, PB
7	3	6	Nina Vuković	Croatia	1:58.38	Q, PB
8	3	8	Jemma Reekie	Great Britain & N.I.	1:58.45	q
9	3	2	Marta Mitjans	Spain	1:58.52	q, PB
10	1	8	Rénelle Lamote	France	1:58.65	q
11	4	3	Gabija Galvydytė	Lithuania	1:58.99	Q
12	3	5	Jana Marie Becker	Germany	1:59.08	PB
13	3	4	Amanda Marie Frøynes	Norway	1:59.09 (.087)	PB
13	4	4	Valentina Rosamilia	Switzerland	1:59.09 (.087)	Q
15	4	6	Anaïs Bourgoin	France	1:59.19	Q
16	1	4	Georgia-Maria Despollari	Greece	1:59.29	NR
17	1	5	Camille Laus	Belgium	1:59.43	PB
18	1	6	Eveliina Määttänen	Finland	1:59.62	SB
19	4	8	Pernille Karlsen Antonsen	Norway	1:59.73 (.726)	
20	4	5	Lorea Ibarzabal	Spain	1:59.73 (.728)	SB
21	2	2	Femke Broeders-Bol	Netherlands	1:59.96	Q
22	2	7	Gabriela Gajanová	Slovakia	2:00.27	Q
23	2	6	Rocío Arroyo	Spain	2:00.62	Q
24	4	7	Aleksandra Formella	Poland	2:00.63	
25	2	4	Anna Wielgosz	Poland	2:00.96	
26	4	2	Pavla Štoudková	Czech Republic	2:01.00	
27	2	5	Erin Wallace	Great Britain & N.I.	2:01.10	
28	4	9	Mariska Parewyck	Belgium	2:01.40	
29	2	3	Caroline Bredlinger	Austria	2:03.41	
30	2	9	Anita Horvat	Slovenia	2:03.68	
	2	8	Majtie Kolberg	Germany	DNF	

=== Semi-finals ===
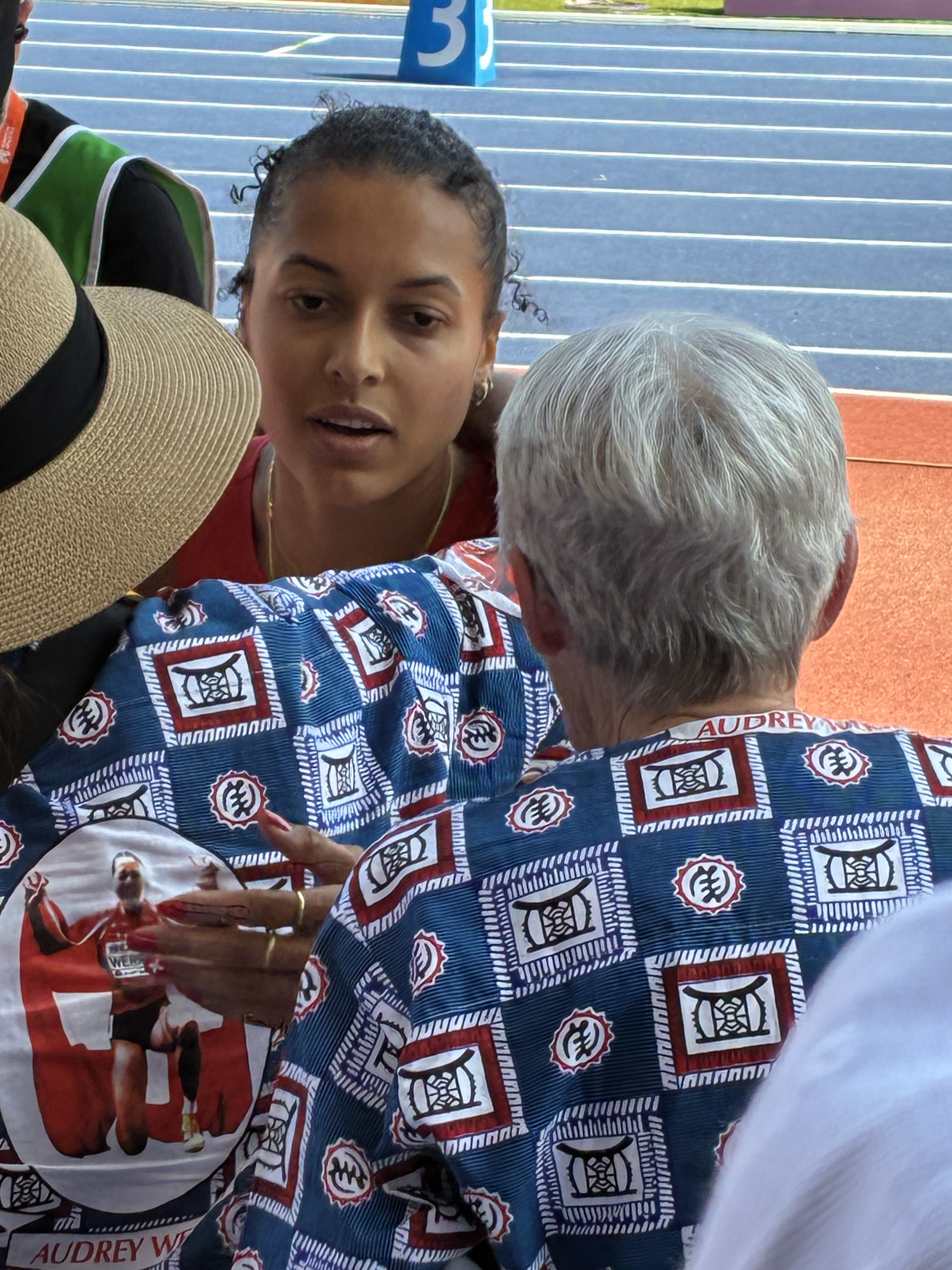
Audrey Werro (center) of Switzerland with her supporters after falling in the first semi-final

On 13 August, sixteen athletes from ten nations competed in the two heats of the semi-finals, starting at 12:10 (UTC+1). Initially, eight athletes, the three fastest in each heat (Q) and the two next fastest overall (q), qualified for the final. In the first heat, Gabija Galvydytė of Lithuania and Audrey Werro of Switzerland finished last, after Werro's foot touched French athlete Anaïs Bourgoin's hand, making Werro trip and fall, which caused Galvydytė to fall as well. Werro said about the race: "I was feeling great but unfortunately[,] I don't know, something happened and then I was on the ground." In the second heat, Valentina Rosamilia of Switzerland ran a personal best (PB) of 1:58.16 min and Clara Liberman ran another personal best of 1:58.19 min. After appealing, the falls of Werro and Galvydytė were ruled unintentional race incidents under technical rule 17.1.1 and both athletes were advanced to the final by a referee decision (qR) as additional ninth and tenth athlete.

Results of the semi-finals
Rank	Heat	Lane	Name	Nation	Time	Note
1	2	2	Keely Hodgkinson	Great Britain & N.I.	1:57.38	Q
2	2	2	Femke Broeders-Bol	Netherlands	1:57.46	Q
3	2	7	Eloisa Coiro	Italy	1:57.74	Q
4	2	4	Valentina Rosamilia	Switzerland	1:58.16	q, PB
5	2	7	Clara Liberman	France	1:58.19	q, PB
6	2	3	Smilla Kolbe	Germany	1:58.21	
7	1	8	Jemma Reekie	Great Britain & N.I.	1:58.61	Q
8	1	6	Anaïs Bourgoin	France	1:58.84	Q
9	2	6	Nina Vuković	Croatia	1:59.10	
10	1	9	Veronica Vancardo	Switzerland	1:59.14	Q
11	2	9	Rocío Arroyo	Spain	1:59.32	SB
12	1	9	Gabriela Gajanová	Slovakia	1:59.32	
13	1	8	Rénelle Lamote	France	1:59.88	
14	1	2	Marta Mitjans	Spain	1:59.91	
15	1	3	Gabija Galvydytė	Lithuania	2:03.59	qR
16	1	3	Audrey Werro	Switzerland	2:35.35	qR

=== Final ===
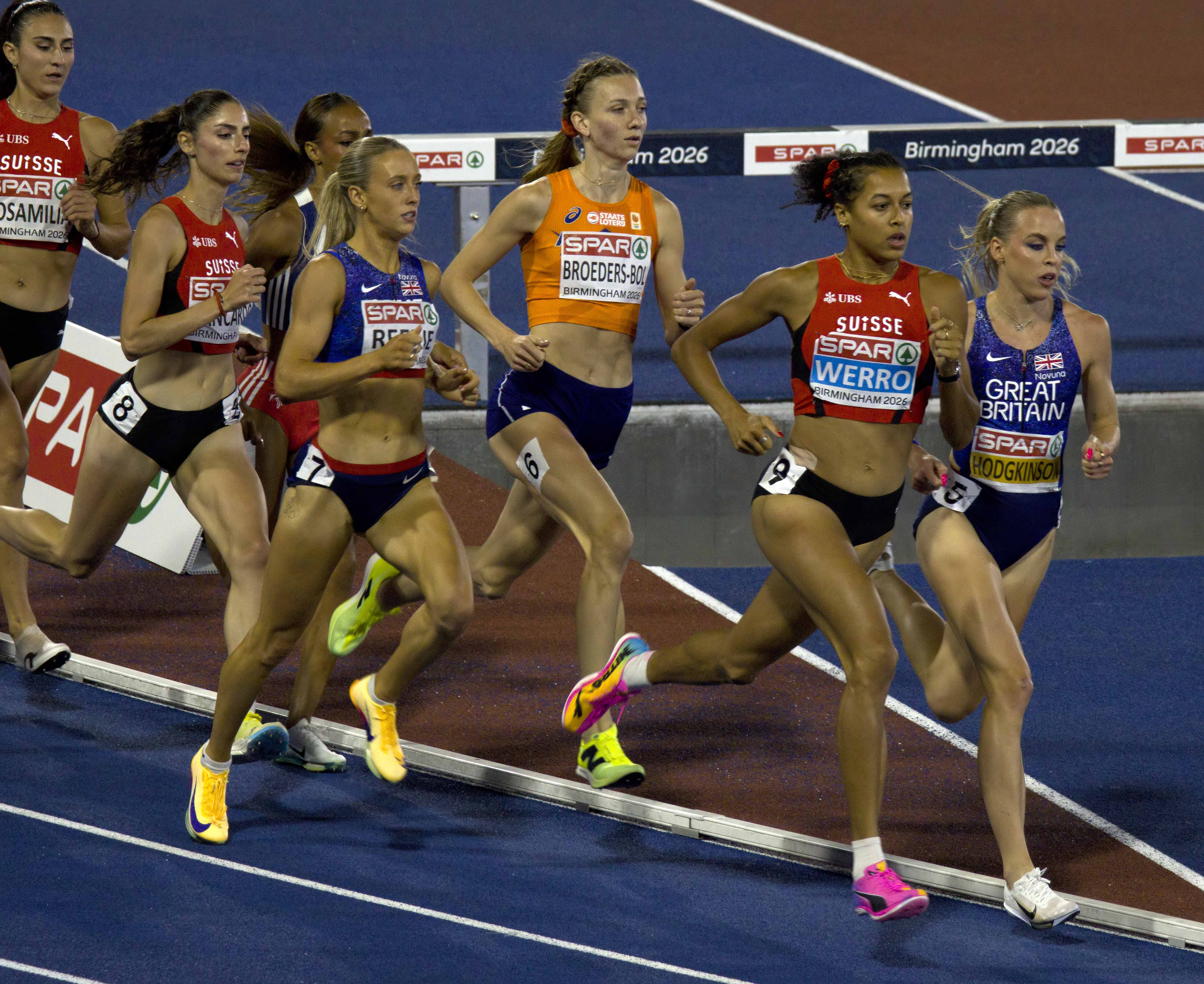
Front runners in the final after breaking for the inside lanes

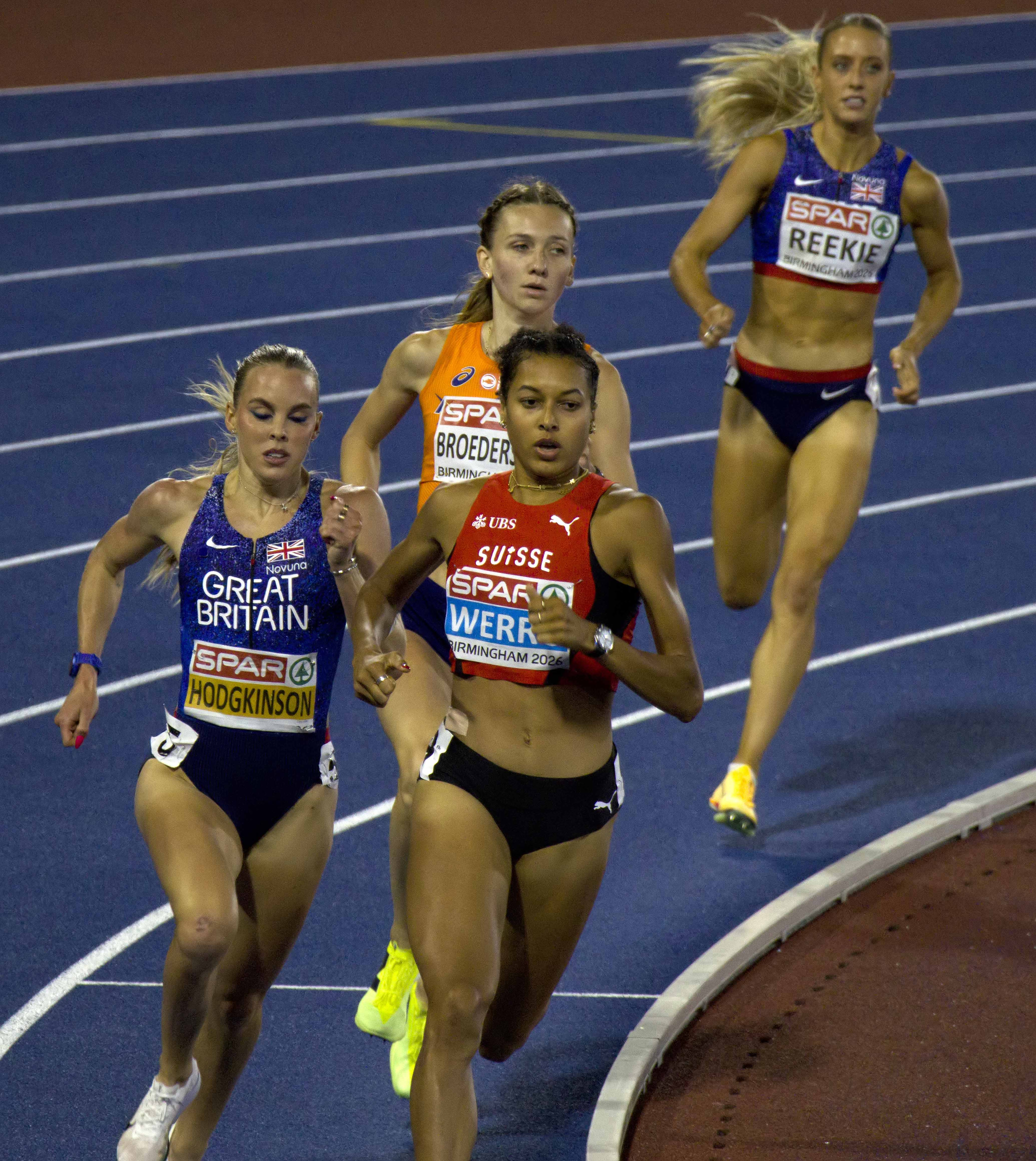
Audrey Werro (center front), Keely Hodgkinson (left), Femke Broeders-Bol (center back), and Jemma Reekie (right) in the final

On 14 August, ten athletes from six nations competed in the final at 21:46 (UTC+1). After breaking for the inside lanes, Keely Hodgkinson of Great Britain and Northern Ireland and Audrey Werro of Switzerland ran side by side in front, followed by Femke Broeders-Bol of the Netherlands next to Jemma Reekie of Great Britain and Northern Ireland, before Werro moved into first position and Reekie was unable to stay with the three front runners. In the second lap, the running order in the front was Werro, Hodgkinson, and Broeders-Bol. The race was won by Werro in a new championship record (CR) of 1:54.81 min, breaking the 44-year-old record of Olga Mineyeva of the Soviet Union. Hodgkinson of Great Britain and Northern Ireland finished in second place in 1:55.01 min, unable to retain her title from 2024. Broeders-Bol finished in third place in 1:55.54 min, equalling the 34-year-old Dutch national record (=NR) of Ellen van Langen.

Fentuo Tahiru Fentuo of Olympics.com called it the "most anticipated race of the 2026 European Athletics Championships". The Dutch public broadcasting news NOS wrote: "The final of the 800 metres was marked in advance as one of the highlights of the European Championships in Birmingham, with three top athletes at the start who showed the fastest times in the world this season." Before the final, Sebastian Coe of World Athletics said in an interview: "I am very excited and I think this could be the best race of the championships." Afterwards, Euan Crumley of Athletics Weekly wrote: "Audrey Werro might have been knocked down, but she got up again to win the first major senior title of her career in hugely impressive style as the women's 800m final at the European Championships in Birmingham lived up to the hype".

In a post-race interview, Werro said: "I knew that today I was the strongest if I went in front; I knew I could run 100 per cent in the lead. I decided that I had to go faster and faster every 100 metres. I saw in the corner of my eye that the heads were right behind me and I couldn’t let go." Hodgkinson said about the final: "Mixed emotions, in that level of competition, any medal is an achievement. I'm defending champion and I really thought I was going to win today, I didn't do anything wrong, it just wasn't to be. I was happy to [let] Audrey take it on, with that wind... [it's] really motivating to be in such a competitive event, I love it." Broeders-Bol, who had switched from the 400 metres hurdles to the 800 metres this year, said in an interview: "An equal national record and bronze in my first year? I couldn't dream of much more." and "[The wind] was why we all wanted to be behind someone. I could feel the [wind] but I was behind Audrey and Keely and that's a nice shelter that helped."

Results of the final
Rank	Lane	Athlete	Nation	Time	Note
1st place, gold medalist(s)	9-1	Audrey Werro	Switzerland	1:54.81	CR
2nd place, silver medalist(s)	5	Keely Hodgkinson	Great Britain & N.I.	1:55.01	
3rd place, bronze medalist(s)	6	Femke Broeders-Bol	Netherlands	1:55.54	=NR
4	9-2	Gabija Galvydytė	Lithuania	1:59.12	
5	7	Jemma Reekie	Great Britain & N.I.	1:59.15	
6	3	Eloisa Coiro	Italy	1:59.35	
7	1	Valentina Rosamilia	Switzerland	1:59.42	
8	8	Veronica Vancardo	Switzerland	2:00.17	
9	4	Anaïs Bourgoin	France	2:00.65	
10	2	Clara Liberman	France	2:01.84	
