= Caroline Bredlinger =

Austrian athlete (born 2001)

Personal information
- Nationality: Austrian
- Born: 4 April 2001 (age 25)

Sport
- Sport: Athletics
- Event: Middle-distance running

Achievements and titles
- Personal bests: 800 m: 1:58.95 (Maribor, 2025)

Caroline Bredlinger (born 4 April 2001) is an Austrian middle-distance runner. She is multiple-time national champion over 800 metres.

== Biography ==
She is from Trausdorf an der Wulka in Burgenland and runs as a member of the Burgenland Eisenstadt team. She placed second behind Carina Schrempf over 800 metres at the Austrian Athletics Championships in August 2020.

She set a new 800 metres personal best running for Austria the 2023 European Athletics Team Championships in Poland. In February 2024, she set a personal best running indoors in Istanbul over 800 metres, running 2:01.76 to finish runner-up at the 2024 Balkan Athletics Indoor Championships.

She won the 800 metres at the 2025 Balkan Athletics Indoor Championships in February 2025 in 2:02.16. She won in Linz at the Austrian Indoor Championships and competed at the 2025 European Athletics Indoor Championships in Apeldoorn, Netherlands, in March 2025. Later that month, she represented Austria at the 2025 World Athletics Indoor Championships in Nanjing, China.

Bredlinger won the women's 800 m race at the 2025 European Athletics Team Championships Second Division in Maribor, Slovenia, in a personal best time of 1:58.95. She was runner-up to Revee Walcott-Nolan over 800 metres in July 2025 in Eisenstadt, at the Austrian Open. Later that month, she won the ISTAF Berlin in a time of 1:58.99 ahead of Lorea Ibarzabal and Majtie Kolberg. The following week, she won her fifth national title at the Austrian Athletics Championships.

In September 2025, she competed in the women's 800 metres at the 2025 World Athletics Championships in Tokyo, Japan.

On 3 February 2026, she ran an indoor personal best 2:00.97 for the 800 metres at the Golden Gala in Ostrava. She won the 1500m title at the Austrian Indoor Athletics Championships with a time of 4:16.31. She competed at the 2026 World Athletics Indoor Championships in Toruń, Poland, without advancing to the semi-finals of the 800 metres. On 4 June 2026, at the Liese Prokop Memorial in St. Pölten, she won the 800 metres in 2:01.41. In August, she competed at the 2026 European Athletics Championships in Birmingham, England, in the women's 800 metres.

== Personal life ==
At age 13, Bredlinger was shot by a drunk man while walking home from a halloween party. Due to these injuries, Bredlingers left leg is weaker then her right one.
