= Maël Gouyette =

French middle-distance runner

Personal information
- Nationality: France
- Born: 21 May 1999 (age 27) Saint-Brieuc, France
- Height: 6 ft 2 in (188 cm)
- Weight: 155 lb (70 kg)

Sport
- Sport: Athletics
- Events: 1500 metres, Mile
- College team: Iona Gaels
- Club: Haute Bretagne Athlétisme

Maël Gouyette (born 21 May 1999) is a French middle-distance runner.

== Professional career ==
He finished fourth in the mile at the 2023 World Athletics Road Running Championships in a time of 3:56.57. He also finished second in the 1500 meters at the 2023 French Athletics Championships and the 2024 Indoor Championships. He currently competes for Haute Bretagne Athlétisme and is sponsored by Hoka, having previously ran for Iona University until 2023.

He competed for France at the 2024 Summer Olympics.

== Personal bests ==
- 1500 metres – 3:32.67 (Nice, 2024)
  - 1500 metres indoor – 3:38.86 (Miramas 2024)
- Mile – 3:53.63 (Pfungstadt 2023)
  - Mile indoor – 3:58.38 (Boston 2023)
  - Mile road – 3:56.57 (Riga 2023)
- 3000 metres – 7:59.36i (New York 2023)
- 5000 metres – 13:36.24 (Vienna 2023)
