= Anna Wielgosz =

Polish middle-distance runner

Anna Wielgosz (Sabat)
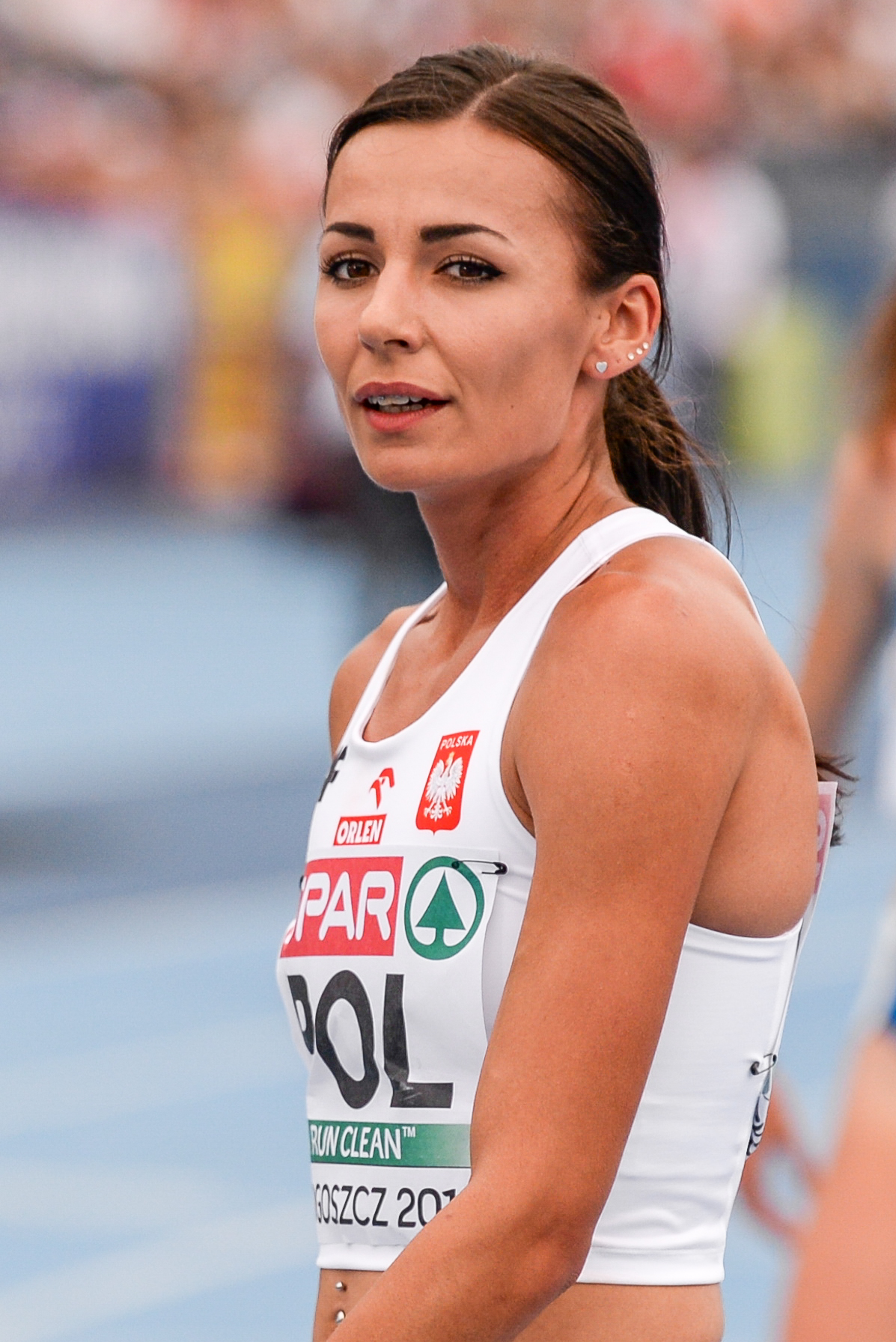
- Wielgosz in 2019

Personal information
- Born: 9 November 1993 (age 32) Nisko, Poland

Sport
- Sport: Athletics
- Event: 800 metres
- Club: CWKS Resovia Rzeszów (2016–)
- Coached by: Jacek Kostrzeba (2021–); Piotr Kowal (–2021)
Medal record
Women's athletics
Representing Poland
European Championships
Bronze medal – third place	2022 Munich	800 m
European Indoor Championships
Gold medal – first place	2025 Apeldoorn	800 m

Anna Wielgosz, née Anna Sabat, (9 November 1993) is a Polish middle-distance runner specialising in the 800 metres. She won the bronze medal at the 2022 European Athletics Championships, having previously finished fifth in 2018.

Wielgosz represented Poland in the 800 metres at the 2020 Tokyo Olympics and the 2024 Paris Olympics. She is a three-time Polish national champion in the event.

== International competitions ==
Representing Poland
Year	Competition	Venue	Position	Event	Notes
2017	World Relays	Nassau, Bahamas	4th	4 × 800 m relay	8:24.71
2018	World Cup	London, United Kingdom	5th	800 m	2:02.93
2018	European Championships	Berlin, Germany	5th	800 m	2:01.26
2018	Continental Cup	Ostrava, Czech Republic	6th	800 m	2:04.43^{1}
2019	European Team Championships Super League	Bydgoszcz, Poland	6th	800 m	2:02.36 SB
2019	World Championships	Doha, Qatar	21st (sf)	800 m	2:04.00
2021	European Indoor Championships	Toruń, Poland	15th (sf)	800 m	2:05.29
2021	Olympic Games	Tokyo, Japan	36th (h)	800 m	2:03.20
2022	World Championships	Eugene, OR, United States	16th (sf)	800 m	2:00.51
2022	European Championships	Munich, Germany	3rd	800 m	1:59.87
2023	World Championships	Budapest, Hungary	52nd (h)	800 m	2:03.61
2024	World Indoor Championships	Glasgow, United Kingdom	9th (h)	800 m	2:01.58
2024	European Championships	Rome, Italy	6th	800 m	1:59.99
2024	Olympic Games	Paris, France	26th (rep)	800 m	2:05.77
2025	European Indoor Championships	Apeldoorn, Netherlands	1st	800 m	2:02.09
2025	World Indoor Championships	Nanjing, China	5th	800 m	2:00.34
2025	World Championships	Tokyo, Japan	21st (sf)	800 m	1:59.72
2026	World Indoor Championships	Toruń, Poland	8th (sf)	800 m	2:00.48
2026	European Championships	Birmingham, United Kingdom	25th (h)	800 m	2:00.96

^{1}Representing Europe

== Personal bests ==
- 800 metres – 1:58.63 (Tokyo 2025)
  - 800 metres indoor – 2:00.34 (Nanjing 2025)
