= Maeve O'Neill =

Irish middle-distance runner (born 2004)

Personal information
- Born: 9 March 2004 (age 22)

Sport
- Sport: Athletics
- Event: Middle-distance running

Achievements and titles
- Personal bests: 800m: 2:00.33 (Boston, 2026)

Maeve O'Neill (born 9 March 2004) is an Irish middle-distance runner. In 2026, she set the Irish indoor national record in the 800 metres with 2:00.33 in Boston, Massachusetts. The time also set an outright Irish under-23 record, bettering the time set earlier that year by Emma Moore.

== Biography ==
From Ballinacarriga, County Cork, O'Neill is a member of Doheny Athletics Club and was educated at Maria Immaculata Community College. Competing as a 17-year-old at the South Munster Schools T&F Championships in 2021, she broke the Irish senior girls' 800 metres record held by Sonia O'Sullivan since 1987, by close to seven seconds, running 2:07.47.

She later studied at Providence College in Rhode Island in the United States. She placed third with Providence in the distance medley relay at the 2025 NCAA Division I Indoor Track and Field Championships alongside Shannon Flockhart, Kimberley May and Jillian Flennerty. She placed third over 800 m at the 2026 Irish Athletics Championships.

O'Neill opened her 2025-26 indoor season by running 1:28.09 for 600 m in early December, and 2:41.07 for 1,000 m in early January. She set a new indoor personal best of 2:01.96 for the 800 metres whilst competing for Providence College in Boston, Massachusetts in January 2026. The following month, she set aa new Irish indoors national record for the 800 metres, running 2:00.33 at the Saucony Battle for Boston meet in Boston, Massachusetts on 22 February 2026. The time also moved her into the top-ten on the NCAA all-time indoors list, and took 25 seconds off the previous Irish indoor record of 2:00.58 set by Síofra Cléirigh Büttner in 2021. The time was also an outright Irish under-23 record, bettering Emma Moore's indoor best set in 2026 and Nadia Power's time of 2:01.01 set outdoors in 2020, and moved her to seventh place on the Irish outright 800 metres list. The time also met the automatic standard for the 2026 World Indoor Championships.

Selected for her major international debut in the 800 metres at the 2026 World Athletics Indoor Championships in Toruń, Poland, in March 2026, she reached the semi-finals. In June 2026, O'Neill qualified over 800 metres for the 2026 NCAA Outdoor Championships, running 2:00.72 at the regional qualifiers, before placing fifth in her semi-final with 2:01.48.
