= Anita Horvat =

Slovenian sprinter (born 1996)

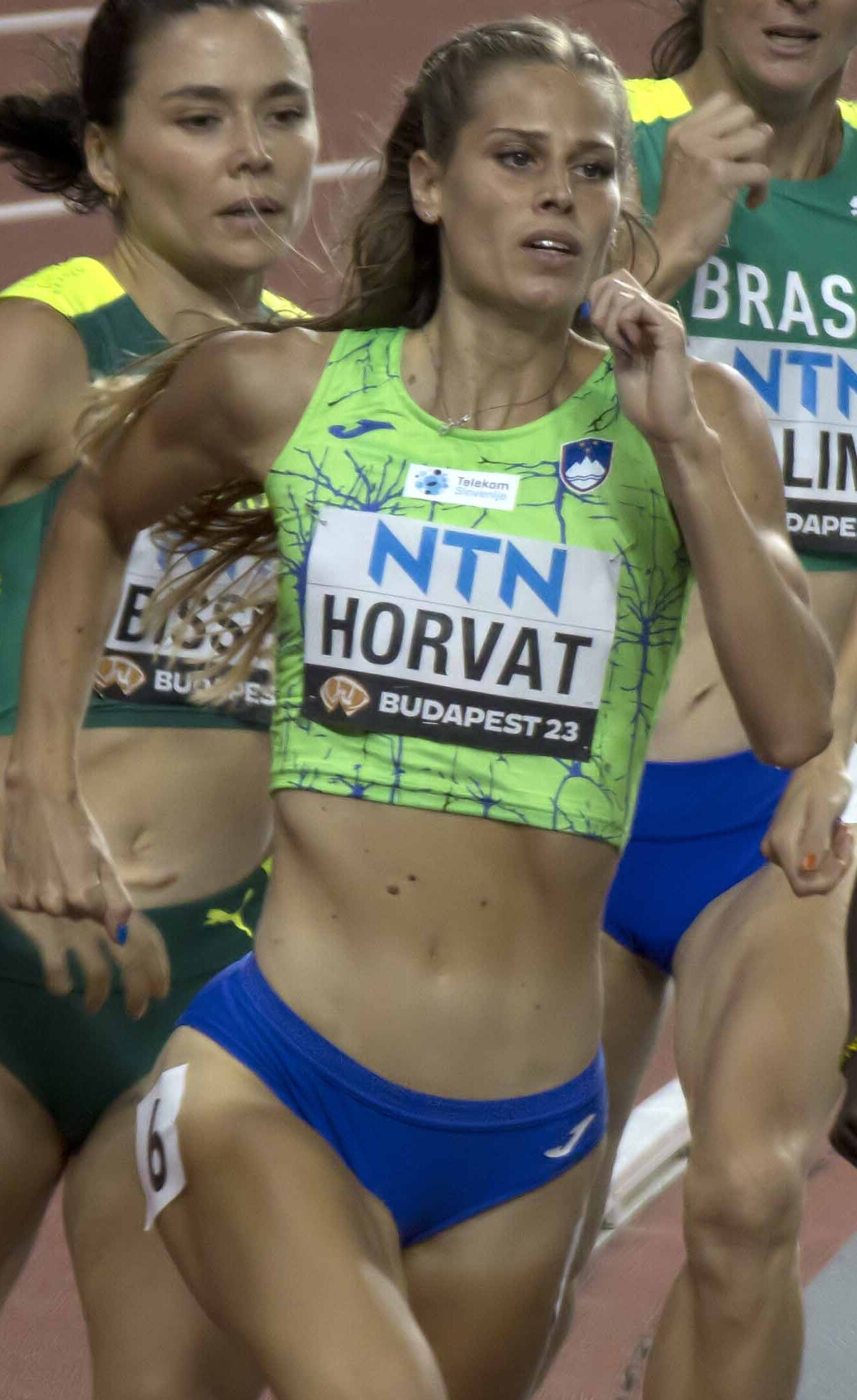
- Horvat in 2023

Personal information
- Born: 7 September 1996 (age 29) Ljubljana, Slovenia
- Height: 1.74 m (5 ft 9 in)

Sport
- Sport: Athletics
- Events: 800 metres, 400 m
- Club: AK Velenje
- Coached by: Tevž Korent
Medal record
Women's athletics
Representing Slovenia
World Relays
Bronze medal – third place	2021 Chorzów	2×2×400 m mixed
European Indoor Championships
Silver medal – second place	2023 Istanbul	800 m
Bronze medal – third place	2025 Apeldoorn	800 m
Mediterranean Games
Silver medal – second place	2022 Oran	400 m
Silver medal – second place	2022 Oran	4×400 m relay

Anita Horvat (born 7 September 1996) is a Slovenian sprinter and middle-distance runner. She placed seventh in the 800 metres at the 2022 World Athletics Championships. Horvat won the silver medal in the event at the 2023 European Indoor Championships and bronze in 2025.

She represented Slovenia in the 400 metres at the 2020 Tokyo Olympics. She is the Slovenian record holder for the 400 metres out and indoors, and took 10 individual national titles (mostly for the 400 m).

== Career ==
Anita Horvat competed in the women's 400 metres at the 2017 and 2019 World Athletics Championships.

She also represented Slovenia in the event at the postponed 2020 Tokyo Olympics in 2021.

In the 2022 season, Horvat gradually shifted to the 800 metres. In March, she won the 400 m at the Balkan Indoor Championships held in Istanbul. She finished second over the 800 m at the outdoor Balkan Championships in Craiova, Romania in June that year. The following month, she placed second in the 400 m at the Mediterranean Games staged in Oran, Algeria. At the 2022 World Athletics Championships held in Eugene the same July, Horvat for the first time broke the two-minute barrier in the 800 m (1:59.60) in her semifinal and eventually finished seventh in 1:59.83 in the first global individual final of her career. She lowered her personal best to 1:58.96 in August and competed in the event at the European Championships in Munich, where she fell and placed last in her heat.

In January 2023, the 26-year-old won her new specialist event at the Init Indoor Meeting Karlsruhe in Germany, a World Athletics Indoor Tour Gold meeting, beating 2022 world indoor silver medallist Freweyni Hailu. She continued her good form in March, claiming the silver medal in the 800 m at the European Indoor Championships held in Istanbul, her first major individual medal and the biggest success up to that point.

== Statistics ==
=== Personal bests ===
- 100 metres – 11.79 (+1.2 m/s, Celje 2017)
- 200 metres – 23.47 (0.0 m/s, Kranj 2017)
  - 200 metres indoor – 23.10 (Metz 2021)
- 400 metres – 51.22 (Monaco 2018) NR
  - 400 metres indoor – 52.22 (Madrid 2018) NR
- 600 metres – 1:26.26 (Milan 2023)
- 800 metres – 1:58.96 (Chorzów 2022)
  - 800 metres indoor – 2:00.35

=== International competitions ===
Representing Slovenia
Year	Competition	Venue	Position	Event	Time
2014	European Team Championships First League	Tallinn, Estonia	10th	400 m hurdles	1:00.81
2014	European Team Championships First League	Tallinn, Estonia	12th	4 × 400 m relay	3:47.78
2014	World Junior Championships	Eugene, OR, United States	9th (h)	4 × 400 m relay	3:42.91 NU20R
2015	European Junior Championships	Eskilstuna, Sweden	7th (h3)	400 m	56.36
2015	European Junior Championships	Eskilstuna, Sweden	6th (h4)	400 m hurdles	1:02.08
2015	European Junior Championships	Eskilstuna, Sweden	8th	4 × 400 m relay	3:46.30
2016	Balkan Indoor Championships	Istanbul, Turkey	2nd (f2)	400 m	54.82
2017	European Indoor Championships	Belgrade, Serbia	24th (h)	400 m	54.65
2017	European Team Championships Second League	Tel Aviv, Israel	4th	400 m	52.72
2017	European Team Championships Second League	Tel Aviv, Israel	9th	4 × 100 m relay	46.39
2017	European Team Championships Second League	Tel Aviv, Israel	2nd	4 × 400 m relay	3:34.19
2017	European U23 Championships	Bydgoszcz, Poland	4th	400 m	53.06
2017	World Championships	London, United Kingdom	38th (h)	400 m	52.78
2018	European Championships	Berlin, Germany	14th (sf)	400 m	51.89
2019	European Indoor Championships	Glasgow, Scotland	12th (sf)	400 m	53.37
2019	European Games	Minsk, Belarus	11th	4 × 400 m mixed	3:20.66
2019	European Team Championships Second League	Varaždin, Croatia	2nd	400 m	52.45
2019	European Team Championships Second League	Varaždin, Croatia	6th	4 × 100 m relay	45.15
2019	European Team Championships Second League	Varaždin, Croatia	1st	4 × 400 m relay	3:36.71
2019	World Championships	Doha, Qatar	39th (h)	400 m	52.73
2019	Military World Games	Wuhan, China	5th (h1)	400 m	55.51
2021	Balkan Indoor Championships	Istanbul, Turkey	1st (f2)	400 m	53.44
2021	Balkan Indoor Championships	Istanbul, Turkey	3rd	4 × 400 m relay	3:41.50
2021	European Indoor Championships	Toruń, Poland	22nd (h)	800 m	2:06.08
2021	World Relays	Chorzów, Poland	3rd	2×2×400 m mixed	3:41.95
2021	European Team Championships Second League	Stara Zagora, Bulgaria	3rd	400 m	52.94
2021	European Team Championships Second League	Stara Zagora, Bulgaria	2nd	4 × 100 m relay	3:30.90 NR
2021	Balkan Championships	Smederevo, Serbia	2nd (f2)	400 m	52.75
2021	Balkan Championships	Smederevo, Serbia	1st	4 × 400 m relay	3:33.99
2021	Olympic Games	Tokyo, Japan	28th (h)	400 m	52.34
2022	Balkan Indoor Championships	Istanbul, Turkey	1st	400 m	52.98
2022	Balkan Indoor Championships	Istanbul, Turkey	1st	4 × 400 m relay	3:37.84
2022	World Indoor Championships	Belgrade, Serbia	10th (h)	4 × 400 m relay	3:37.08 NR
2022	Balkan Championships	Craiova, Romania	2nd	800 m	2:02.25
2022	Mediterranean Games	Oran, Algeria	2nd	400 m	51.94 SB
2022	Mediterranean Games	Oran, Algeria	2nd	4 × 400 m relay	3:31.51
2022	World Championships	Eugene, OR, United States	33rd (h)	400 m	52.67
2022	World Championships	Eugene, OR, United States	7th	800 m	1:59.83
2022	European Championships	Munich, Germany	30th (h)	800 m	2:23.76
2022	European Championships	Munich, Germany	13th (h)	4 × 400 m relay	3:31.57
2023	European Indoor Championships	Istanbul, Turkey	2nd	800 m	2:00.54
2023	World Championships	Budapest, Hungary	16th (sf)	800 m	2:00.54
2024	European Championships	Rome, Italy	16th (sf)	800 m	2:04.30
2024	Olympic Games	Paris, France	10th (rep)	800 m	2:00.56
2025	European Indoor Championships	Apeldoorn, Netherlands	3rd	800 m	2:02.52
2025	World Championships	Tokyo, Japan	29th (h)	800 m	2:00.66
2026	World Indoor Championships	Toruń, Poland	– (h)	800 m	DNF
2026	European Championships	Birmingham, United Kingdom	30th (h)	800 m	2:03.68
2026	European Championships	Birmingham, United Kingdom	16th (h)	4 × 400 m relay	3:35.82
