= Pernille Karlsen Antonsen =

Norwegian middle-distance runner

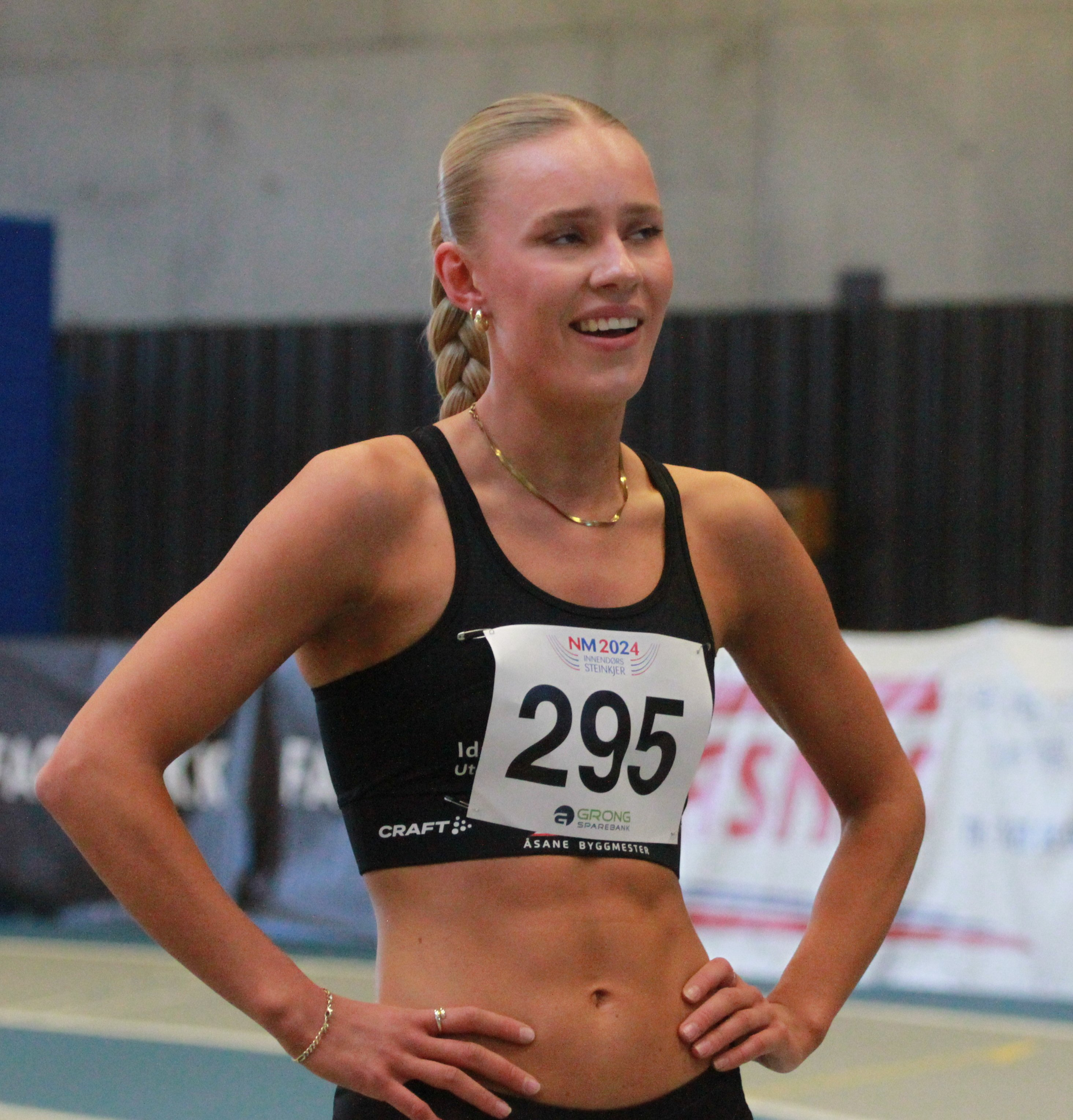
- Pernille Karlsen Antonsen

Personal information
- Born: 13 December 2002 (age 23)

Sport
- Sport: Athletics
- Event: Middle-distance running

Achievements and titles
- Personal bests: 800m: 1:58.52 (2026); Indoor; 800m: 2:00.77 (2026) NR

Pernille Karlsen Antonsen (born 13 December 2002) is a Norwegian middle-distance runner. She has won multiple Norwegian national titles and is the national record holder over 800 metres indoors.

== Biography ==
A member of IL Norna-Salhus, on 17 February 2024, she won the 800 metres title at the Norwegian Indoor Championships. In April 2025, she won the Norwegian short course cross country championships title. The following month, Antonsen improved Hedda Hynne's Norwegian national record time in the 600 metres by 37 hundredths when she ran 1:26.53 in Pliezhausen, Germany. In August 2025, she won the 800 metres title at the Norwegian Championships.

Antonsen set a new Norwegian national indoor record with a time of 2:00.89, three hundredths of a second faster than the previous Norwegian record set by Hedda Hynne in 2021, whilst competing at the Indoor Copernicus Cup in Toruń, Poland in February 2026.

On 1 March 2026, she won the 800 metres title at the Norwegian Indoor Championships. She was subsequently selected for the 2026 World Athletics Indoor Championships in Toruń, Poland, running a new indoor national record of 2:00.77 in advancing to the semi-finals of the 800 metres. In May, she won the 800 metres at the Trond Mohn Games in Bergen, running 2:00.85. On 7 June, she ran a personal best 1:58.82 for the 800 metres at the 2026 Diamond League event in Stockholm. In August, she competed at the 2026 European Athletics Championships in Birmingham, England, in the women's 800 metres.
