= Gabija Galvydytė =

Lithuanian athlete (born 2000)

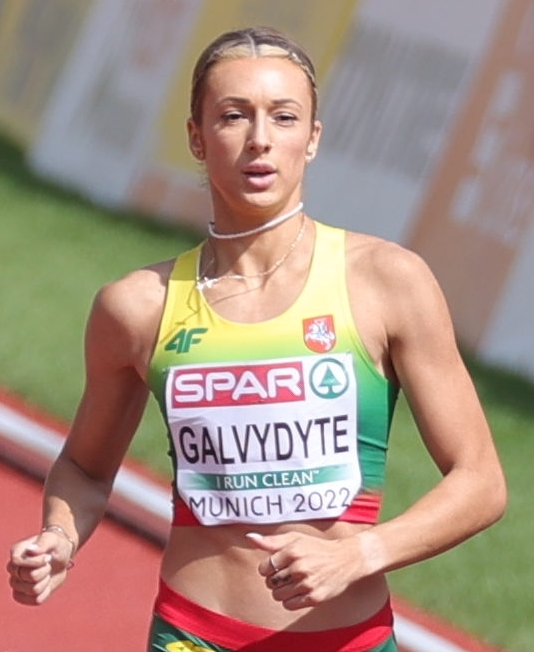
- Galvydytė at the 2022 European Championships

Personal information
- Born: 17 January 2000 (age 26) Jonava, Lithuania
- Education: Oklahoma State University
- Height: 5 ft 8 in (173 cm)

Sport
- Sport: Athletics
- Events: Middle-distance running, hurdling
- Club: Nike Swoosh Track Club
- Turned pro: 2024
- Coached by: Dave Smith
Medal record
Women's athletics
Representing Lithuania
European Games
Bronze medal – third place	2023 Kraków-Małopolska	1500 m

Gabija Galvydytė (born 17 January 2000) is a Lithuanian athlete specialising in middle-distance running. She won a bronze medal at the 2023 European Games in the 1500 metre event.

== Career ==
Galvydytė competed at the 2017 World U18 Championships and finished fourth in the 400 metre hurdles. She then finished 16th in the 400 metre hurdles semifinals at the 2018 World U20 Championships. She then competed with the 4 × 400 metres relay team at the 2018 European Championships.

At the 2019 European U20 Championships, Galvydytė finished ninth in the 400 metre hurdles semifinals, missing the final by 0.02 seconds. She competed with the 4 × 400 metres relay team that finished 20th at the 2019 IAAF World Relays.

Galvydytė finished 14th in the 800 metres and the 2021 European U23 Championships with a personal best time. She represented Lithuania at the 2022 European Athletics Championships in the 800 metres and finished 22nd in the heats.

Galvydytė represented Lithuania at the 2023 European Games and finished fifth in the 800 metres, setting a new personal best time. She then won a bronze medal in the 1500 metres behind Claudia Bobocea and Vera Hoffmann. She won the Lithuanian national title in the 800 metres. She qualified to make her World Championships debut based on her world ranking. She competed in the 800 metres, finishing 29th in the heats.

Galvydytė qualified to represent Lithuania at the 2024 Summer Olympics in the 800 metres based on her world ranking. She finished fourth in her heat with a personal best time of 1:59.18 and qualified for the repechage round. In the repechage round, she finished fourth with a time of 2:00.66 and did not advance to the semifinals.

=== International competitions ===
Year	Competition	Venue	Position	Event	Notes
Representing Lithuania
2017	World U18 Championships	Nairobi, Kenya	4th	400 m hurdles	59.49
2018	World U20 Championships	Tampere, Finland	16th	400 m hurdles	58.88
2018	European Championships	Berlin, Germany	15th (h)	4 × 400 m relay	3:37.73
2019	World Relays	Yokohama, Japan	20th (h)	4 × 400 m relay	3:38.72
2022	European Championships	Munich, Germany	24th (h)	800 m	2:03.92
2023	European Games	Chorzów, Poland	5th	800 m	2:00.29 (PB)
2023	European Games	Chorzów, Poland	3rd	1500 m	4:09.48
2024	Olympic Games	Paris, France	12th (rep)	800 m	2:00.66
2025	European Indoor Championships	Apeldoorn, Netherlands	19th (h)	800 m	2:04.18
2025	World Championships	Tokyo, Japan	12th (sf)	800 m	1:57.96
2025	World Championships	Tokyo, Japan	14th (sf)	1500 m	4:01.79
2026	World Indoor Championships	Toruń, Poland	18th (h)	1500 m	4:17.28
2026	European Championships	Birmingham, United Kingdom	4th	800 m	1:59.12
2026	European Championships	Birmingham, United Kingdom	10th (h)	1500 m	4:09.66

== NCAA ==
Gabija Galvydytė graduated from Oklahoma State University and competed for their cross country and track teams.

Gabija Galvydytė is a 6-time NCAA Division I All-American, 3-time Big 12 Conference Champion, and 10-time All-Big 12 Conference honoree as a distance runner.

representing Oklahoma State Cowgirls
2024	NCAA Division I Outdoor Track and Field Championships	800 m	2:00.23	(bronze) 3rd
2024	Big 12 Conference Outdoor Track and Field Championships	800 m	2:00.42	(gold) 1st
2024	Big 12 Conference Outdoor Track and Field Championships	4 × 400 m relay	3:40.55	9th
2024	NCAA Division I Indoor Track and Field Championships	800 m	2:02.31	5th
2024	Big 12 Conference Indoor Track and Field Championships	800 m	2:01.07	(silver) 2nd
2024	Millrose Games	800 m	2:02.24	5th
2023	2023 NCAA Division I cross country championships	6 km	20:12.5	48th
2023	Big 12 Conference cross country championships	6 km	20:25.5	15th
2023	NCAA Division I Outdoor Track and Field Championships	800 m	2:00.47	(silver) 2nd
2023	NCAA Division I Outdoor Track and Field Championships	4 × 400 m relay	3:36.55	28th
2023	Big 12 Conference Outdoor Track and Field Championships	800 m	2:03.66	(gold) 1st
2023	Big 12 Conference Outdoor Track and Field Championships	4 × 400 m relay	3:36.51	5th
2023	NCAA Division I Indoor Track and Field Championships	DMR	11:02.57	6th
2023	Big 12 Conference Indoor Track and Field Championships	800 m	2:05.11	(silver) 2nd
2023	Big 12 Conference Indoor Track and Field Championships	DMR	11:12.21	(gold) 1st
2023	Big 12 Conference Indoor Track and Field Championships	4 × 400 m relay	3:39.27	8th
2022	2022 NCAA Division I cross country championships	6 km	20:27.1	74th
2022	Big 12 Conference cross country championships	6 km	20:59.7	9th
2022	NCAA Division I Outdoor Track and Field Championships	800 m	2:01.76	(bronze) 3rd
2022	Big 12 Conference Outdoor Track and Field Championships	800 m	2:03.79	(silver) 2nd
2022	NCAA Division I Indoor Track and Field Championships	800 m	2:04.40	9th
2022	Big 12 Conference Indoor Track and Field Championships	800 m	2:03.89	(silver) 2nd
2022	Big 12 Conference Indoor Track and Field Championships	4 × 400 m relay	3:36.22	(bronze) 3rd
2021	Big 12 Conference Indoor Track and Field Championships	600 yards	1:22.90	7th
2021	Big 12 Conference Indoor Track and Field Championships	Distance medley relay	11:21.42	(silver) 2nd
2020	Big 12 Conference Indoor Track and Field Championships	800 m	2:09.48	6th
2020	Big 12 Conference Indoor Track and Field Championships	4 × 400 m relay	3:40.14	6th
