= Emma Moore =

Irish middle-distance runner (born 2004)

Personal information
- Born: 14 April 2004 (age 22)

Sport
- Sport: Athletics
- Event: Middle-distance running

Achievements and titles
- Personal best: 800m: 2:00.71 (2026)

Emma Moore (born 14 April 2004) is an Irish middle-distance runner. She represented Ireland over 800 metres at the 2026 World Athletics Indoor Championships.

== Biography ==
From Oranmore in County Galway, competing in 2018, Moore broke the Irish under-15 records over 800 metres, both indoors and outdoors, and won her first Irish schools title, whilst at Presentation College, Athenry. Moore later trained to become a secondary school teacher studying Biology and PE at Dublin City University, but Moore's early running career was interrupted in 2023 and 2024 by Relative energy deficiency in sport syndrome, and injuries, such as a stress fracture to her femur. She worked with athletics coach Jim Ryan, as well as Martina McCarthy and Claire Brady at the Sport Ireland Institute.

Moore is a member of Galway City Harriers. In February 2025, she made an impact on her debut at senior level, finishing runner-up at the Irish Indoor Athletics Championships in Abbottstown, Dublin over 800 metres, finishing behind Louise Shanahan.

In July 2025, Moore represented Ireland for the first time, competing in the 800 metres as part of the Irish 4 x 400 metres team at the 2025 European Athletics U23 Championships in Bergen, Norway. In the 4 x 400 metres relay, she was part of the Irish team that ran a new Irish under-23 record time of 3:34.81.

That winter, Moore had a breakthrough indoor campaign. In December 2025, Moore ran a personal best for the 800 metres indoors of 2:02.39 in Dublin, competing for Galway City Harriers. The time was also an Irish national under-23 record and places her sixth on the all-time Irish senior indoor list. Moore improved it the following month with an outright 800 metres personal best time of 2:02.34 at the CMCM Indoor Meeting in Luxembourg, a silver meeting on the 2026 World Athletics Indoor Tour. The following week, Moore broke her own new Irish U23 indoor 800m record, with a run of 2:01.21 on 28 January, moving to third on the Irish senior indoor all-time list for the event. The next week, she ran 2:02.19 at the Czech Indoor Gala in Ostrava. On 1 March 2026, Moore was runner-up in the 800 metres at the Irish Indoor Athletics Championships for the second consecutive year, finishing behind Hannah Segrave.

Selected for the 800 metres at the 2026 World Athletics Indoor Championships in Toruń, Poland, in March 2026 for her major championship debut, her time of 2:02.00 placed her fifth in her heat and was the second fastest in her career and although faster than some automatic qualifiers, did not take her through to the semi-finals. On 16 June, Moore ran a new personal best for the 800 metres of 2:00.71 at the Golden Spike meeting in Ostrava. On 26 July, she placed second overall behind a fast-finishing Madison Mooney in the 800 metres at the 2026 Irish championships.
