= Lorea Ibarzabal =

Spanish athlete (born 1994)

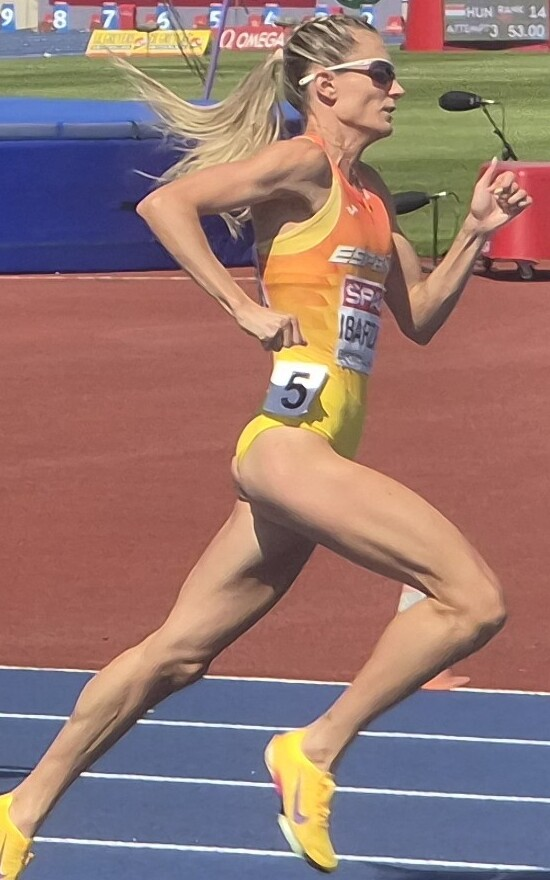
- Ibarzabal at the 2026 European Championships

Personal information
- Full name: Lorea Ibarzabal Padorno
- Born: 7 November 1994 (age 31) Las Palmas, Gran Canaria, Spain
- Height: 1.69 m (5 ft 7 in)

Sport
- Country: Spain
- Sport: Athletics
- Event: 800 metres
- Club: Nike

Achievements and titles
- Personal bests: 800 m: 1:59.60 (2025); Indoors; 800 m: 2:00.56i (2024)
Medal record
Women's athletics
Representing Spain
Mediterranean Games
Silver medal – second place	2026 Taranto	800 m

Lorea Ibarzabal Padorno (born 7 November 1994) is a Spanish Olympian middle-distance runner. She finished fourth in the 800 metres at the 2023 European Indoor Championships.

Ibarzabal has won multiple Spanish national titles (800 m indoors and outdoors).

== Biography ==
In February 2021, after she overcame a significant injury, 26-year-old Lorea Ibarzabal won her first national title, with a victory in the 800 metres at the Spanish Indoor Championships.

In February 2023, she ran the second-fastest time by a Spanish woman ever in the indoor 800 m, clocking 2:01.00 in Metz. The same month, she claimed national indoor 800 m title for the second time. In March, the 28-year-old competed in the event at the 2023 European Indoor Championships in Istanbul. It was the Ibarzabal's first major competition representing Spain, and she said that the semi-final was additionally emotional for her as she was competing on the birthday of her running partner Bea, who had died four months earlier. In the final she came within 0.02 s of bronze medal, but ran a personal best of 2:00.87 to finish fourth. In July 2023, she broke two minutes for the 800m, running 1:59.88 in Madrid.

Ibarzabal competed for Spain at the 2024 World Indoor Championships over 800 metres. She ran an indoors personal best in her qualifying heat with a time of 2:00.56. She competed at the 2024 European Athletics Championships in Rome in June 2024. She was officially selected for the Spanish National Olympic Team. She competed in the 800 metres at the 2024 Summer Olympics in Paris in August 2024.

In September 2025, she competed in the women's 800 metres at the 2025 World Athletics Championships in Tokyo, Japan.

Ibarzabal reached the semi-finals of the 800 m at the 2026 World Athletics Indoor Championships in Toruń, Poland. On 19 June 2026, she had a top-ten finish over 800 metres at the 2026 Doha Diamond League. In August, she competed at the 2026 European Athletics Championships in Birmingham, England, in the women's 800 metres.

== Statistics ==
=== International competitions ===
Year	Competition	Venue	Position	Event	Time
Representing Spain
2023	European Indoor Championships	Istanbul, Turkey	4th	800 m i	2:00.87
2023	European Games	Chorzów, Poland	9th	800 m	2:00.86
2023	World Championships	Budapest, Hungary	55th (h)	800 m	2:06.33
2024	World Indoor Championships	Glasgow, United Kingdom	11th (sf)	800 m i	2:00.73
2024	European Championships	Rome, Italy	12th (h)	800 m	2:01.15
2024	Olympic Games	Paris, France	6th (rep)	800 m	1:59.81
2025	European Indoor Championships	Apeldoorn, Netherlands	9th (h)	800 m i	2:03.50
2025	World Indoor Championships	Nanjing, China	4th (sf)	800 m	2:02.57
2025	World Championships	Tokyo, Japan	27th (h)	800 m	2:00.60
2026	World Indoor Championships	Toruń, Poland	12th (sf)	800 m	2:00.74
2026	European Championships	Birmingham, United Kingdom	20th (h)	800 m	1:59.73
2026	Mediterranean Games	Taranto, Italy	2nd	800 m	2:00.07

== Education ==
Lorea studied mechanical engineering at the University of Portland. She also holds a master's degree in product development engineering from the University of Southern California, a Master of Science in biomechanics from the University of Dundee and a third master's degree in big data from the UCAM.

== Personal life ==
Lorea Ibarzabal was born in Las Palmas, Gran Canaria but is now based in Madrid and trains in Valladolid. Her father, Daniel Ibarzabal, is from Zumarraga in Gipuzkoa province of the Basque country. Her mother, Patricia Padorno, was a middle-distance runner in the 1980s. Her maternal grandfather is the Spanish relevant painter and poet Manuel Padorno.

== National titles ==
- SPANISH Indoor ATHLETICS CHAMPIONSHIPS
  - 800 metres: 2021, 2023, 2024, 2025
- SPANISH ATHLETICS CHAMPIONSHIPS
  - 800 metres: 2023, 2024
