= Louise Shanahan =

Irish middle-distance runner

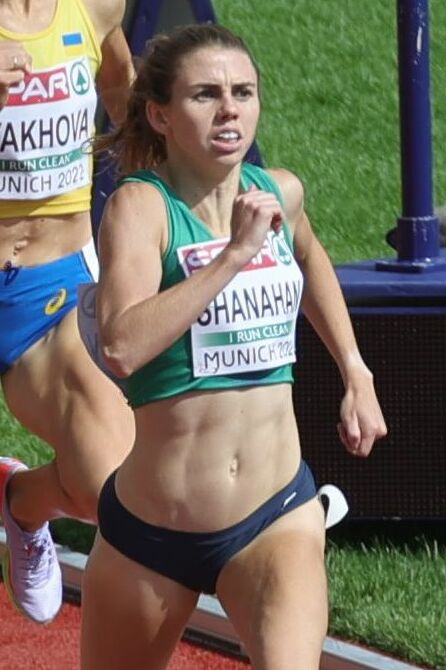
- 2022 European Championships by Sandro Halank

Personal information
- Nationality: Irish
- Born: 26 January 1997 (age 29) Cork, Ireland

Sport
- Sport: Athletics
- Event: 800 metres

Louise Shanahan (born 26 January 1997) is an Irish athlete. She competed in the women's 800 metres event at the 2020 Summer Olympics.

== Early life and education ==
Shanahan was born in Cork, Ireland, a child of Liz and Ray Shanahan. When she was growing up, Shanahan's father was her coach, until she moved to England. Her father was also an Irish national champion in the 1500 meters, making them the first father and daughter to become national champions in Ireland in that event.

Shanahan obtained a BSc degree in physics from the University College Cork (Cork, Ireland) in 2019. She completed a PhD in physics at Trinity College, Cambridge in 2024.

== Career ==
In 2013, Shanahan became the European Youth Champion in the 800 metres. However, after breaking a bone in her foot in 2015, she struggled to maintain her form. Despite this, she was the Irish 1500m champion in 2021.

From February 2021, she began to improve her performances in an attempt to take part in the delayed 2020 Summer Olympics in Tokyo, after the World Student Games were cancelled. She made the qualification for the Ireland Olympic team following results in Europe ahead of the Games. At the beginning of 2021, she had targeted a place at the 2024 Summer Olympics in Paris.
