= Charlotte Dumas (runner) =

French athlete (born 1997)

Personal information
- Born: 7 August 1997 (age 29) Roussillon, France
- Height: 164 cm (5 ft 5 in)
- Weight: 49 kg (108 lb)

Sport
- Country: France
- Sport: Athletics
- Event: Middle-distance running

Achievements and titles
- Personal bests: 800m: 2:00.26 (Miramas, 2026) 1500m: 4:27.57 (Lyon, 2024)

Charlotte Dumas (born 7 August 1997) is a French middle-distance runner. She won the 800 metres at the 2026 French Indoor Athletics Championships. She represented France at the 2025 European Athletics Indoor Championships.

== Biography ==
Dumas competed as a youngster for Coquelicot 42 in Saint Etienne. In 2018, she had a three-second improvement over 800 metres whilst competing in La Duchère. Later Dumas became based in Clermont-Ferrand, training with Jean-François Pontier, and a member of Clermont Auvergne Athletics.

Dumas set an indoor personal best for the 800 metres of 2:01.91, on 8 February 2025 in Metz. Later that month, she placed second behind Clara Liberman in the 800 metres at the French Indoor Athletics Championships in Miramas. Dumas was subsequently selected represent France, and was a semi-finalist in the 800 metres at the 2025 European Athletics Indoor Championships in Apeldoorn, Netherlands, the following month.

In January 2026, she defeated Liberman and Agathe Guillemot as she set a meeting record and outright 800 metres lifetime best of 2:00.26 at the Elite Indoor Miramas Meeting, a World Athletics Indoor Tour silver meeting in Miramas. The time also met the automatic qualifying standard for the 2026 World Indoor Championships. Dumas won the 800 metres national title at the 2026 French Indoor Athletics Championships in Aubiere. She reached the semi-finals of the 800 m at the 2026 World Athletics Indoor Championships in Toruń, Poland. In May, Dumas secured a win over 800 metres, running close to her personal best with 2:00.49 in Rehlingen. In July, she was runner-up to Clara Lieberman in the 800m in 1:59.47 at the Meeting Stanislas Nancy in France.
