= Léna Kandissounon =

French athlete (born 1998)

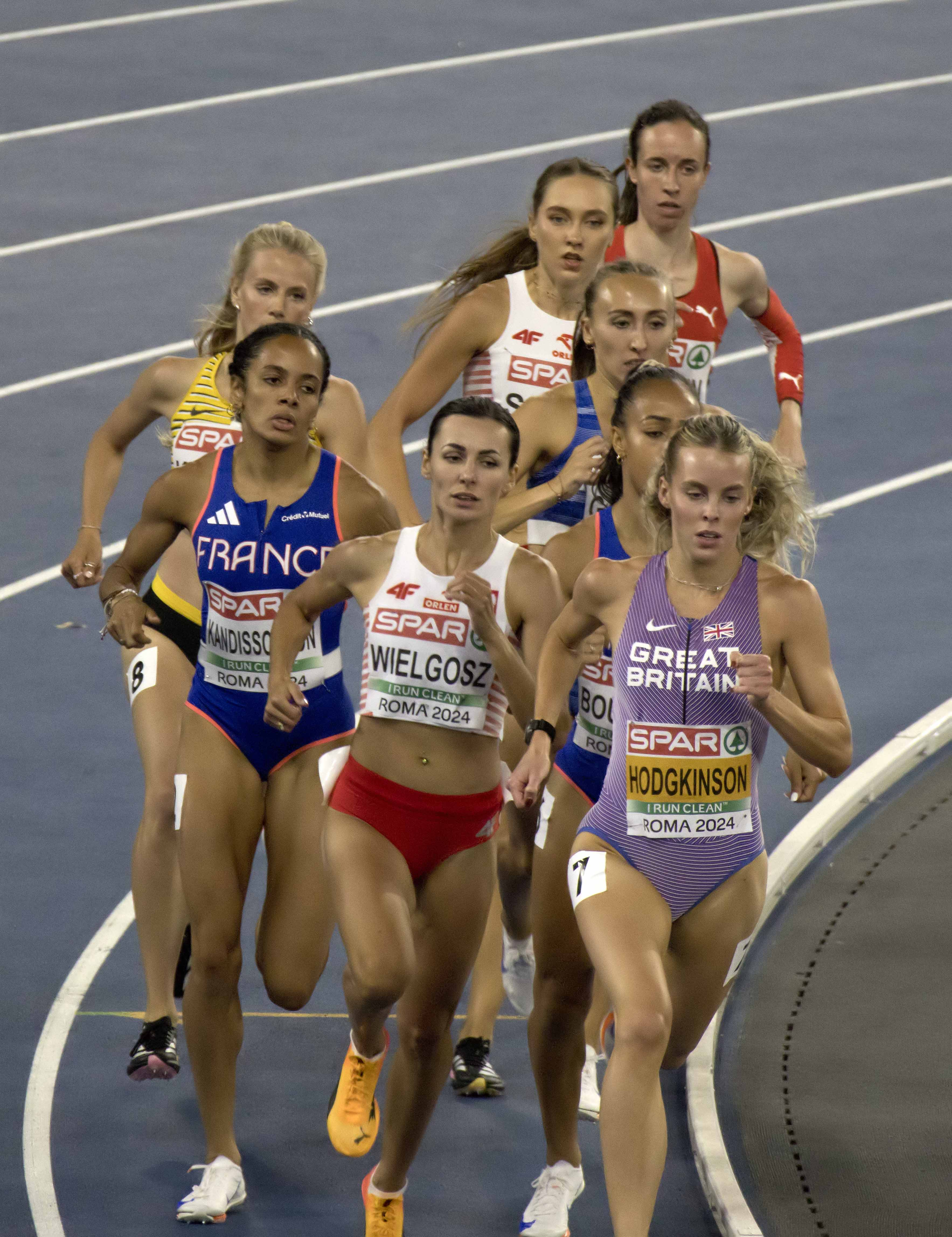
- Competing at the 2024 European Championships

Personal information
- Born: 26 November 1998 (age 27) Brest, France
- Height: 1.70 m (5 ft 7 in)
- Weight: 54 kg (119 lb)

Sport
- Country: France
- Sport: Athletics
- Events: 400m, 800m

Achievements and titles
- Personal bests: 400m: 53.39 (Grenoble, 2022); 800m: 1:59.65 (Paris, 2023)

Léna Kandissounon (born 26 November 1998) is a French track and field athlete. She has won French national championship titles over 800 metres both indoors and outdoors. She has competed at multiple major championships, including the 2024 Olympic Games.

== Early life ==
Born in Brest, with Franco-Beninese heritage, Kandissounon grew up in Aulnay-sous-Bois in the suburbs of Paris.

== Career ==
Coached by Marc Reuzé, at the Haute Bretagne Athlé, in Rennes, Kandissounon splits her time between Paris and Brittany. She won the French national under-23 indoor title over 800 metres, in Saint-Brieuc in 2020. The following year, she won the national senior title at the 2021 French Indoor Athletics Championships.

Kandissounon reached the semi-final at the 2023 European Athletics Indoor Championships in Istanbul, Turkey, in March 2023. In June 2023, she set a new personal best, and ran sub-two minutes for the 800 metres for the first time, when she achieved a time of 1:59.65 at the 2023 Paris Diamond League event in June 2023. The following month, she won the 800 metres at the French Athletics Championships in Albi, in a time of 2:02:00.

She ran to fourth place in the final of the 800 metres at the 2024 European Athletics Championships in Rome, Italy in June 2024, running a time of 1:59.81. She competed in the 800 metres at the 2024 Olympic Games in Paris in August 2024. She ran 2:00.97 in her qualifying round and ran in the repechage round but did not qualify for the semi-finals.

She was selected for the 2025 European Athletics Indoor Championships in Appeldoorn, where she finished in third place in her qualifying heat and did not progress to the semi-final.

On 3 February 2026, she met the automatic qualification standard for the 2026 World Indoor Championships with a run of 2:00.84 for the 800 metres at the Golden Gala in Ostrava. She was runner-up in the 800 metres to Charlotte Dumas at the 2026 French Indoor Athletics Championships in Aubiere.
