= Rachel Klopfenstein =

Mauritian sprinter (born 1995)

Rachel Klopfenstein OLY
Personal information
- Nationality: Mauritian
- Born: Rachel Pellaud; 8 March 1995 (age 31)

Sport
- Sport: Athletics
- Event: Sprinting

Rachel Klopfenstein OLY (née Pellaud; born 8 March 1995) is a Mauritian athlete. She competed in the women's 4 × 400 metres relay event at the 2019 World Athletics Championships.

She switched her nationality from Switzerland to Mauritius in March 2026.

On the 16th June 2026 at the Ostrava Golden Spike, Klopfenstein broke the Mauritian 800m record with her time of 1:58.73 to finish 4th.
