= Eloisa Coiro =

Italian sprinter and middle-distance runner

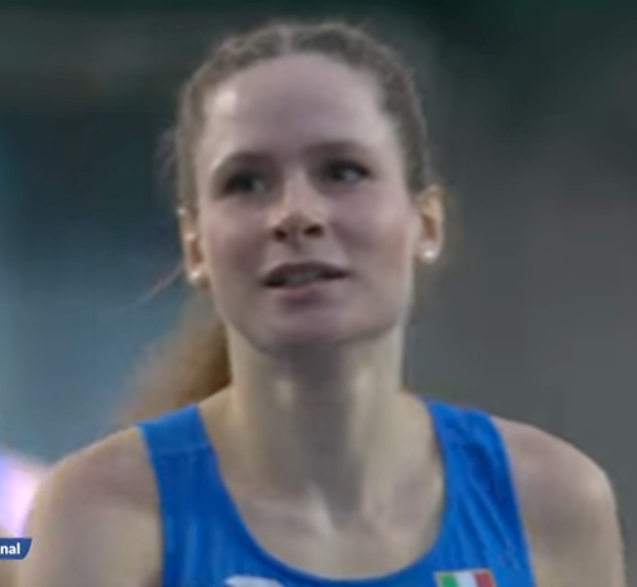
- At the 2025 Summer World University Games

Personal information
- National team: Italy
- Born: 1 December 2000 (age 25) Rome, Italy
- Height: 1.70 m (5 ft 7 in)
- Weight: 53 kg (117 lb)

Sport
- Sport: Athletics
- Event: Sprint
- Club: G.S. Fiamme Azzurre
- Coached by: Emilio De Bonis

Achievements and titles
- Personal bests: 400 m outdoor: 52.95 (2021); 400 m indoor: 53.44 (2021); 800 m: 1:57.56 (2026) NR
Medal record
European Championships
Bronze medal – third place	2026 Birmingham	4 × 400 m relay
World University Games
Gold medal – first place	2025 Bochum	800 m
Mediterranean Games
Silver medal – second place	2022 Oran	800 m
European U23 Championships
Silver medal – second place	2021 Tallinn	800 m

Eloisa Coiro (born 1 December 2000) is an Italian sprinter, specialized in the 400 metres.

== Career ==
She competed in the women's 4 × 400 metres event at the 2021 European Athletics Indoor Championships.

== Statistics ==
=== Achievements ===
Senior level

Year	Competition	Venue	Position	Event	Time	Notes
2021	European Indoor Championships	(Poland) Toruń	4th	4 × 400 m relay	3:30.32	NR
2023	European Indoor Championships	(Turkey) Istanbul	7th	800 m	2:02:80	
2026	European Championships	(United Kingdom) Birmingham	6th	800 m	1:59.35	(Note: She ran the heat with a best time of 1:57.56 also National Record)
2026	European Championships	(United Kingdom) Birmingham	3rd	4 × 400 m relay	3:23.57	

=== National titles ===
Coiro won five national championships at individual senior level.

- Italian Athletics Championships
  - 800 m: 2019, 2022, 2023, 2024 (4)
- Italian Athletics Indoor Championships
  - 400 m: 2026 (1)

=== National records ===
- 4 × 400 metres relay indoor: 3:30.32 ( (Poland) Toruń, 7 March 2021 with Rebecca Borga, Alice Mangione, Eleonora Marchiando) Current holder
