= 2013 World Youth Championships in Athletics – Girls' 800 metres =

Girls' 800 metres at the 2013 World Youth Championships in Athletics
- Venue: RSC Olimpiyskiy
- Dates: 11 July (heats); 12 July (semifinal); 14 July (final)
- Competitors: 30
- Winning time: 2:01.13 CR

Medalists
gold medal	Aníta Hinriksdóttir	Iceland
silver medal	Dureti Edao	Ethiopia
bronze medal	Raevyn Rogers	United States

The girls' 800 metres at the 2013 World Youth Championships in Athletics was held on 11, 12 and 14 July.

== Medalists ==
Gold	Silver	Bronze
Aníta Hinriksdóttir; Iceland	Dureti Edao; Ethiopia	Raevyn Rogers; United States

== Records ==
Prior to the competition, the following records were as follows.

World Youth Best	Wang Yuan (CHN)	1:57.18	Beijing, China	8 September 1993
Championship Record	Mercy Cherono (KEN)	2:01.67	Bressanone, Italy	12 July 2009
World Youth Leading	Mary Cain (USA)	1:59.51	Eugene, OR, United States	1 June 2013

== Heats ==
Qualification rule: first 3 of each heat (Q) and the next 4 fastest qualified.

=== Heat 1 ===
Rank	Lane	Name	Nationality	Time	Notes
1	6	Kokeb Tesfaye	Ethiopia	2:07.27	Q, PB
2	7	Raevyn Rogers	United States	2:08.17	Q
3	8	Renée Eykens	Belgium	2:08.41	Q
4	4	Mareen Kalis	Germany	2:08.80	q
5	2	Chelsea Jarvis	Great Britain	2:09.73	q
6	5	Yuliya Moroz	Ukraine	2:11.64	
7	3	Eleonora Vandi	Italy	2:15.11	
8	1	Lakeisha Warner	British Virgin Islands	2:17.08	

=== Heat 2 ===
Rank	Lane	Name	Nationality	Time	Notes
1	2	Aníta Hinriksdóttir	Iceland	2:04.79	Q
2	8	Dureti Edao	Ethiopia	2:05.20	Q, PB
3	3	Faheemah Scraders	Bermuda	2:08.91	Q, PB
4	7	Johanna Matintalo	Finland	2:09.54	q
5	5	Natálie Kolajová	Czech Republic	2:12.14	
6	6	Maria Larsen	Denmark	2:12.96	
7	4	Jana van der Merwe	South Africa	2:15.06	

=== Heat 3 ===
Rank	Lane	Name	Nationality	Time	Notes
1	1	Ersula Farrow	United States	2:09.98	Q
2	4	Elena Bellò	Italy	2:10.00	Q, PB
3	7	Emily Jenkinson	Great Britain	2:10.04	Q
4	3	Sandra Kočiš	Croatia	2:10.87	q
5	8	Tarryn Davey	New Zealand	2:10.93	
6	6	Bridget O'Neill	Canada	2:13.50	
7	2	Elena Strutinschi	Romania	2:18.32	
8	5	Maryna Duts	Ukraine	2:19.03	

=== Heat 4 ===
Rank	Lane	Name	Nationality	Time	Notes
1	2	Georgia Wassall	Australia	2:08.18	Q
2	6	Esther Asamu	Nigeria	2:09.10	Q
3	5	Kailee Sawyer	Canada	2:09.59	Q
4	8	Emma Stähr	Germany	2:11.10	
5	4	Fatma Arik	Turkey	2:11.74	
6	3	Lina Grišiūtė	Lithuania	2:12.39	
	7	Jarinter Mwasya	Kenya	DQ	

== Semifinals ==
Qualification rule: first 3 of each heat (Q) and the 2 fastest times (q) qualified.

=== Heat 1 ===
Rank	Lane	Name	Nationality	Time	Notes
1	4	Aníta Hinriksdóttir	Iceland	2:02.43	Q
2	3	Raevyn Rogers	United States	2:05.35	Q
3	1	Renée Eykens	Belgium	2:06.73	Q
4	5	Chelsea Jarvis	Great Britain	2:07.74	q
5	2	Elena Bellò	Italy	2:08.69	
6	7	Johanna Matintalo	Finland	2:10.48	
7	6	Sandra Kočiš	Croatia	2:11.07	
	8	Kokeb Tesfaye	Ethiopia	DQ	

=== Heat 2 ===
Rank	Lane	Name	Nationality	Time	Notes
1	4	Dureti Edao	Ethiopia	2:05.89	Q
2	6	Georgia Wassall	Australia	2:05.96	Q
3	2	Ersula Farrow	United States	2:06.75	Q, PB
4	7	Mareen Kalis	Germany	2:07.84	q
5	3	Emily Jenkinson	Great Britain	2:08.10	
6	5	Kailee Sawyer	Canada	2:08.99	
7	1	Faheemah Scraders	Bermuda	2:09.30	
8	8	Esther Asamu	Nigeria	2:09.91	

== Final ==
Results:

Rank	Lane	Name	Nationality	Time	Notes
1st place, gold medalist(s)	3	Aníta Hinriksdóttir	Iceland	2:01.13	CR
2nd place, silver medalist(s)	6	Dureti Edao	Ethiopia	2:03.25	PB
3rd place, bronze medalist(s)	5	Raevyn Rogers	United States	2:03.32	PB
4	4	Georgia Wassall	Australia	2:04.32	
5	8	Chelsea Jarvis	Great Britain	2:07.01	
6	2	Renée Eykens	Belgium	2:07.70	
7	7	Mareen Kalis	Germany	2:08.38	
8	1	Ersula Farrow	United States	2:13.56	
