= 2022 World Athletics Indoor Championships – Women's 800 metres =

Women's 800 metres at the 2022 World Athletics Indoor Championships
- Venue: Štark Arena
- Dates: 19–20 March
- Competitors: 17 from 13 nations
- Winning time: 1:59.09

Medalists
gold medal	Ajeé Wilson	United States
silver medal	Freweyni Hailu	Ethiopia
bronze medal	Halimah Nakaayi	Uganda

The women's 800 metres at the 2022 World Athletics Indoor Championships took place on 19–20 March 2022.

== Summary ==
Heavy favorite for gold, Great Britain's Keely Hodgkinson, withdrew from the event due to a quad injury. Eight women qualified into the six lane track, four of them had to share lanes. Ajeé Wilson, paired with Freweyni Hailu, ran her first four steps fast off the line to immediately give her clear running in her lane, then she settled into her own pace. Natoya Goule, alone in lane 5, ran a fast first turn to have a clear lead at the break. Halimah Nakaayi and Habitam Alemu lined up on her shoulder, while Wilson took the inside. Catriona Bisset came up to box Wilson along the rail while Goule held the lead. Just past the half way point, Bisset slowed to release Wilson from the box, which Wilson confirmed by drifting to her right, blocking Bisset from returning to that position. Wilson waited until the next straightaway, when she capitalized on her freedom, speeding past Alemu, Nakaayi and Goule just before the bell. And Wilson just kept going, opening up a 4 metre lead on the field by the backstretch. Goule began to fade, as Nakaayi gave chase. But Wilson was uncatchable on her way to a clear win. From sixth place entering the final turn, Hailu drifted to the outside of lane 2 and sprinted past the field, passing Nakaayi 2 metres out for silver.

== Results ==
=== Heats ===
Qualification: First 2 in each heat (Q) and the next 2 fastest (q) advance to the Final.

The heats were started at 11:44.

Rank	Heat	Lane	Name	Nationality	Time	Notes
1	3	2	Habitam Alemu	Ethiopia	2:01.12	Q,SB
2	3	5	Catriona Bisset	Australia	2:01.24	Q
3	3	6	Halimah Nakaayi	Uganda	2:01.47	q
4	1	6	Natoya Goule	Jamaica	2:01.65	Q
5	1	4	Freweyni Hailu	Ethiopia	2:01.70	Q, SB
6	3	1	Lindsey Butterworth	Canada	2:01.99	q
7	1	3	Jenny Selman	Great Britain	2:02.00	
8	3	3	Angelika Cichocka	Poland	2:02.01	
9	1	5	Madeleine Kelly	Canada	2:02.06	
10	1	1	Elena Bellò	Italy	2:02.35	
11	1	2	Olivia Baker	United States	2:02.35	
12	2	2	Ajeé Wilson	United States	2:03.42	Q
13	2	3	Lorena Martín	Spain	2:03.85	Q
14	2	5	Tigist Girma	Ethiopia	2:03.85	
15	3	4	Naomi Korir	Kenya	2:03.94	
16	2	4	Hedda Hynne	Norway	2:04.17	
17	2	1	Síofra Cléirigh Büttner	Ireland	2:06.99	
	2	6	Keely Hodgkinson	Great Britain	DNS	

=== Final ===
The final was started at 18:07.

Rank	Name	Nationality	Time	Notes
1st place, gold medalist(s)	Ajeé Wilson	United States	1:59.09	SB
2nd place, silver medalist(s)	Freweyni Hailu	Ethiopia	2:00.54	SB
3rd place, bronze medalist(s)	Halimah Nakaayi	Uganda	2:00.66	
4	Natoya Goule	Jamaica	2:01.18	
5	Catriona Bisset	Australia	2:01.24	
6	Lindsey Butterworth	Canada	2:03.21	
7	Habitam Alemu	Ethiopia	2:03.37	
8	Lorena Martín	Spain	2:03.93	
