= Athletics at the 2020 Summer Olympics – Women's 800 metres =

Women's 800 metres at the Games of the XXXII Olympiad
- Olympic Athletics
- Venue: Japan National Stadium
- Dates: 30 July 2021 (heats); 31 July 2021 (semifinals); 3 August 2021 (final)
- Competitors: 46 from 29 nations
- Winning time: 1:55.21

Medalists
1st place, gold medalist(s)		Athing Mu	United States
2nd place, silver medalist(s)		Keely Hodgkinson	Great Britain
3rd place, bronze medalist(s)		Raevyn Rogers	United States

Official Video Highlights

The women's 800 metres event at the 2020 Summer Olympics took place from 30 July to 3 August 2021 at the Japan National Stadium. 46 athletes from 29 nations competed. 19-year-old Athing Mu of the United States won the gold medal. The silver medal went to Keely Hodgkinson of Great Britain, and the bronze medal went to Mu's American teammate Raevyn Rogers.

Mu's gold medal was the United States' first in the event since 1968.

== Summary ==
The fastest qualifier in the semis was 19-year-old American Athing Mu, with Great Britain's Alexandra Bell getting one of the time qualifying spots behind her. Another 19-year-old, Great Britain's European indoor 800 metres champion and senior novice Keely Hodgkinson, won the third semi. The final included a third young star from Great Britain who had made an international breakthrough in the COVID ravaged 2020 season as double 2019 under-23 European champion at the middle distances, 23-year-old Jemma Reekie. The biggest name eliminated before the final was the third American, Ajeé Wilson who had twice won World Championship bronze, in 2017 and 2019, behind athletes now ineligible because of high naturally occurring testosterone. Wang Chunyu of China, Natoya Goule of Jamaica and Habitam Alemu of Ethiopia rounded out the final.

While few outside of the USA had ever faced her, Mu's reputation as a front runner from the NCAA season preceded her. Coming off the break, Mu was the leader. First semi winner Natoya Goule and Habitam Alemu fell in behind letting Mu dictate the pace. Rather than blow their doors off, Mu ran a controlled first 400 metres, trusting her finishing speed, with the pack still tight as she completed the first lap in 57.82. Only Rogers was a couple steps off the back of the pack. Over the next hundred metres, Mu accelerated and the pack turned into a single file line. As they passed 200 metres to go, Jemma Reekie worked her way past Alemu and Goule on the inside to lead the chase of Mu. Hodgkinson joined the back of the group of four breaking away a couple of metres behind Mu. Through the turn, Mu expanded her lead as Hodgkinson followed Reekie inside of Alemu and Goule, then stepped to the outside for running room. Rogers was next to last coming off the turn as Mu pulled away from Reekie. Hodgkinson was the only one left to give chase, holding Mu but failing to gain. Mu had five metres on Hodgkinson at the finish, who had several metres herself on the athletes battling for bronze. Behind the two clear front-runners, Rogers moved out to lane 4 and sprinted past the field to grab bronze at the line from a despairing Reekie struggling to maintain form in the last thirty metres.

Mu's winning time of 1:55.21 was number 11 on the world all-time list and the fourth fastest of this century (and the sixth fastest since the world record was set in 1983). It also broke the 4-year-old United States record. Hodgkinson broke the 26-year old British National Record of double Olympic champion and compatriot Kelly Holmes – both runners set continental junior records. Following the race, commentators predicted the budding Mu-Hodgkinson rivalry could come to define the women's 800 metres over the coming decade. As if to prove the point, at the end of the season, while Mu took a much deserved break, Hodgkinson won her first global title, becoming 2021 Diamond League champion over 800 metres in Zurich. The budding rivalry gathered momentum the following season as Mu again beat Hodgkinson in the 1–2 for the World title, but this time by mere inches.

== Background ==
This was the 17th time the event was held. The women's 800 metres was first held in 1928, but the idea that the distance was too great for women prompted the IOC to drop it from the Olympic programme. It was reintroduced in 1960.

== Qualification ==
A National Olympic Committee (NOC) could enter up to 3 qualified athletes in the women's 800 metres event if all athletes meet the entry standard or qualify by ranking during the qualifying period. (The limit of 3 has been in place since the 1930 Olympic Congress.) The qualifying standard is 1:59.50. This standard was "set for the sole purpose of qualifying athletes with exceptional performances unable to qualify through the IAAF World Rankings pathway." The world rankings, based on the average of the best five results for the athlete over the qualifying period and weighted by the importance of the meet, will then be used to qualify athletes until the cap of 48 is reached.

The qualifying period was originally from 1 May 2019 to 29 June 2020. Due to the COVID-19 pandemic, the period was suspended from 6 April 2020 to 30 November 2020, with the end date extended to 29 June 2021. The world rankings period start date was also changed from 1 May 2019 to 30 June 2020; athletes who had met the qualifying standard during that time were still qualified, but those using world rankings would not be able to count performances during that time. The qualifying time standards could be obtained in various meets during the given period that have the approval of the IAAF. Both indoor and outdoor meets were eligible for qualifying. The most recent Area Championships may be counted in the ranking, even if not during the qualifying period.

NOCs can also use their universality place—each NOC can enter one female athlete regardless of time if they had no female athletes meeting the entry standard for an athletics event—in the 800 metres.

== Competition format ==
The event continued to use the three-round format introduced in 2012.

== Records ==
Prior to this competition, the existing global and area records were as follows.

World record	Jarmila Kratochvílová (TCH)	1:53.28	Munich, West Germany	26 July 1983
Olympic record	Nadezhda Olizarenko (URS)	1:53.43	Moscow, Soviet Union	27 July 1980
World Leading	Athing Mu (USA)	1:56.07	Eugene, Oregon, United States	27 June 2021

Area
Area	Time (s)	Athlete	Nation
Africa (records)	1:54.01	Pamela Jelimo	Kenya
Asia (records)	1:55.54	Liu Dong	China
Europe (records)	1:53.28 WR	Jarmila Kratochvílová	Czechoslovakia
North, Central America and Caribbean (records)	1:54.44	Ana Fidelia Quirot	Cuba
Oceania (records)	1:58.09	Catriona Bisset	Australia
South America (records)	1:56.58	Letitia Vriesde	Suriname

The following national records were established during the competition:

Nation	Athlete	Round	Time	Notes
Finland	Sara Kuivisto	Heats	2:00.15	
Finland	Sara Kuivisto	Semifinals	1:59.41	
United States	Athing Mu	Final	1:55.21	
Great Britain	Keely Hodgkinson	Final	1:55.88	

== Schedule ==
All times are Japan Standard Time (UTC+9)

The women's 800 metres took place over three separate days.

Date	Time	Round
Friday, 30 July 2021	9:00	Round 1
Saturday, 31 July 2021	19:00	Semifinals
Tuesday, 3 August 2021	19:25	Final

== Results ==
=== Heats ===
Progression rules: First 3 in each heat (Q) and the next 6 fastest (q) advance to the Semifinals.

==== Heat 1 ====
Rank	Athlete	Nation	Time	Notes
1	Rénelle Lamote	France	2:01.92	Q
2	Winnie Nanyondo	Uganda	2:02.02	Q
3	Lore Hoffmann	Switzerland	2:02.05	Q
4	Angelika Sarna	Poland	2:02.18	
5	Madeleine Kelly	Canada	2:02.39	
6	Morgan Mitchell	Australia	2:05.44	
	Līga Velvere	Latvia	DNF	

==== Heat 2 ====
Rank	Athlete	Nation	Time	Notes
1	Natoya Goule	Jamaica	1:59.83	Q
2	Noélie Yarigo	Benin	2:00.11	SB, Q
3	Hedda Hynne	Norway	2:00.76	Q
4	Halimah Nakaayi	Uganda	2:00.92	q
5	Katharina Trost	Germany	2:00.99	q
6	Eunice Sum	Kenya	2:03.00	
7	Nadia Power	Ireland	2:03.74	
8	Rose Lokonyen	Refugee Olympic Team	2:11.87	NR

==== Heat 3 ====
Rank	Athlete	Nation	Time	Notes
1	Athing Mu	United States	2:01.10	Q
2	Habitam Alemu	Ethiopia	2:01.20	Q
3	Joanna Jóźwik	Poland	2:01.87	Q
4	Melissa Bishop-Nriagu	Canada	2:02.11	
5	Christina Hering	Germany	2:02.23	
6	Bianka Bartha-Kéri	Hungary	2:02.82	
7	Louise Shanahan	Ireland	2:03.57	

==== Heat 4 ====
Rank	Athlete	Nation	Time	Notes
1	Raevyn Rogers	United States	2:01.42	Q
2	Keely Hodgkinson	Great Britain	2:01.59	Q
3	Mary Moraa	Kenya	2:01.66	Q
4	Netsanet Desta	Ethiopia	2:01.98	
5	Lindsey Butterworth	Canada	2:02.45	
6	Anna Wielgosz	Poland	2:03.20	
7	Síofra Cléirigh Büttner	Ireland	2:04.62	
8	Nimali Liyanarachchi	Sri Lanka	2:10.23	

==== Heat 5 ====
Rank	Athlete	Nation	Time	Notes
1	Rose Mary Almanza	Cuba	2:00.71	Q
2	Déborah Rodríguez	Uruguay	2:00.90	Q
3	Rababe Arafi	Morocco	2:00.96 (.957)	Q
4	Alexandra Bell	Great Britain	2:00.96 (.960)	q
5	Catriona Bisset	Australia	2:01.65	
6	Delia Sclabas	Switzerland	2:03.03	
7	Shafiqua Maloney	Saint Vincent and the Grenadines	2:07.89	
8	D'Jamila Tavares	São Tomé and Príncipe	2:16.72	PB

==== Heat 6 ====
Rank	Athlete	Nation	Time	Notes
1	Jemma Reekie	Great Britain	1:59.97	Q
2	Ajeé Wilson	United States	2:00.02	Q
3	Wang Chunyu	China	2:00.05	Q
4	Sara Kuivisto	Finland	2:00.15	q, NR
5	Elena Bellò	Italy	2:01.07	q
6	Natalia Romero	Spain	2:01.16	q, PB
7	Gabriela Gajanová	Slovakia	2:01.41	SB
8	Emily Cherotich Tuei	Kenya	2:08.08	

=== Semifinals ===
Progression rules: First 2 in each heat (Q) and the next 2 fastest (q) advance to the Final.

==== Heat 1 ====
Rank	Athlete	Nation	Time	Notes
1	Natoya Goule	Jamaica	1:59.57	Q
2	Jemma Reekie	Great Britain	1:59.77	Q
3	Mary Moraa	Kenya	2:00.47	
4	Ajeé Wilson	United States	2:00.79	
5	Joanna Jóźwik	Poland	2:02.32	
6	Elena Bellò	Italy	2:02.35	
7	Hedda Hynne	Norway	2:02.38	
8	Halimah Nakaayi	Uganda	2:04.44	

==== Heat 2 ====
Rank	Athlete	Nation	Time	Notes
1	Athing Mu	United States	1:58.07	Q
2	Habitam Alemu	Ethiopia	1:58.40	Q
3	Alexandra Bell	Great Britain	1:58.83	q
4	Lore Hoffmann	Switzerland	1:59.38	
5	Rénelle Lamote	France	1:59.40	
6	Sara Kuivisto	Finland	1:59.41	NR
7	Noélie Yarigo	Benin	2:01.41	
8	Natalia Romero	Spain	2:01.52	

==== Heat 3 ====
Rank	Athlete	Nation	Time	Notes
1	Keely Hodgkinson	Great Britain	1:59.12	Q
2	Wang Chunyu	China	1:59.14	Q, PB
3	Raevyn Rogers	United States	1:59.28	q
4	Rose Mary Almanza	Cuba	1:59.65	
5	Winnie Nanyondo	Uganda	1:59.84	SB
6	Rababe Arafi	Morocco	1:59.86	
7	Déborah Rodríguez	Uruguay	2:01.76	
8	Katharina Trost	Germany	2:02.14	

=== Final ===
Rank	Athlete	Nation	Time	Notes
1st place, gold medalist(s)	Athing Mu	United States	1:55.21	NR AJR
2nd place, silver medalist(s)	Keely Hodgkinson	Great Britain	1:55.88	NR AJR
3rd place, bronze medalist(s)	Raevyn Rogers	United States	1:56.81	PB
4	Jemma Reekie	Great Britain	1:56.90	PB
5	Wang Chunyu	China	1:57.00	PB
6	Habitam Alemu	Ethiopia	1:57.56	SB
7	Alexandra Bell	Great Britain	1:57.66	PB
8	Natoya Goule	Jamaica	1:58.26	
