= 2021 European Athletics Indoor Championships – Women's 800 metres =

Women's 800 metres at the 2021 European Athletics Indoor Championships
- Venue: Arena Toruń
- Location: Toruń, Poland
- Dates: 5 March 2021 (round 1); 6 March 2021 (semi-finals); 7 March 2021 (final)
- Competitors: 35 from 18 nations
- Winning time: 2:03.88

Medalists
gold medal	Keely Hodgkinson	Great Britain
silver medal	Joanna Jóźwik	Poland
bronze medal	Angelika Cichocka	Poland

The women's 800 metres event at the 2021 European Athletics Indoor Championships was held on 5 March 2021 at 13:00 (heats), on 6 March at 19:00 (semi-finals), and on 7 March at 18:13 (final) local time.

== Records ==
Standing records prior to the 2021 European Athletics Indoor Championships
World record	Jolanda Čeplak (SLO)	1:55.82	Vienna, Austria	3 March 2002
European record	Jolanda Čeplak (SLO)	1:55.82	Vienna, Austria	3 March 2002
Championship record	Jolanda Čeplak (SLO)	1:55.82	Vienna, Austria	3 March 2002
World Leading	Gudaf Tsegay (ETH)	1:57.52	Val-de-Reuil, France	14 February 2021
European Leading	Keely Hodgkinson (GBR)	1:59.03	Vienna, Austria	30 January 2021

== Results ==
=== Heats ===
Qualification: First 3 in each heat (Q) advance to the Semi-finals.

Rank	Heat	Athlete	Nationality	Time	Note
1	5	Anna Wielgosz	Poland	2:02.79	Q, PB
2	5	Nadia Power	Ireland	2:03.16	Q
3	5	Tanja Spill	Germany	2:03.22	Q
4	3	Elena Bellò	Italy	2:03.80	Q
5	6	Christina Hering	Germany	2:04.06	Q
6	6	Angelika Cichocka	Poland	2:04.06	Q
7	3	Isabelle Boffey	Great Britain	2:04.08	Q
8	3	Daniela García	Spain	2:04.14	Q, PB
9	6	Sara Kuivisto	Finland	2:04.20	Q
10	3	Síofra Cléirigh Büttner	Ireland	2:04.47	
11	6	Georgie Hartigan	Ireland	2:04.74	
12	5	Vendula Hluchá	Czech Republic	2:04.87	SB
13	2	Joanna Jóźwik	Poland	2:05.19	Q
14	2	Irene Baldessari	Italy	2:05.44	Q
15	5	Jerneja Smonkar	Slovenia	2:05.44	
16	2	Selina Rutz-Büchel	Switzerland	2:05.62	Q
17	1	Keely Hodgkinson	Great Britain	2:05.63	Q
18	2	Mirte Fannes	Belgium	2:05.65	
19	3	Svitlana Zhulzhyk	Ukraine	2:05.68	
20	1	Lovisa Lindh	Sweden	2:05.78	Q
21	1	Eleonora Vandi	Italy	2:06.02	Q
22	6	Anita Horvat	Slovenia	2:06.08	
23	4	Ellie Baker	Great Britain	2:06.15	Q
24	1	Līga Velvere	Latvia	2:06.26	
25	4	Lore Hoffmann	Switzerland	2:06.35	Q
26	4	Vanessa Scaunet	Belgium	2:06.44	Q
27	4	Hedda Hynne	Norway	2:06.46	
28	4	Katharina Trost	Germany	2:06.89	
29	1	Delia Sclabas	Switzerland	2:07.04	
30	2	Bregje Sloot	Netherlands	2:07.33	
31	3	Suzanne Voorrips	Netherlands	2:07.78	
32	4	Gaël De Coninck	Sweden	2:08.05	
33	6	Konstadina Yiannopoulou	Greece	2:08.62	
34	2	Albina Deliu	Kosovo	2:14.06	
	5	Britt Ummels	Netherlands	DQ	

=== Semifinals ===
Qualification: First 2 in each heat (Q) advance to the Final.

Rank	Heat	Athlete	Nationality	Time	Note
1	1	Keely Hodgkinson	Great Britain	2:03.11	Q
2	2	Joanna Jóźwik	Poland	2:03.15	Q
3	3	Angelika Cichocka	Poland	2:03.18	Q
4	3	Ellie Baker	Great Britain	2:03.29	Q
5	2	Isabelle Boffey	Great Britain	2:03.34	Q
6	1	Lore Hoffmann	Switzerland	2:03.58	Q
7	2	Elena Bellò	Italy	2:03.61	
8	3	Sara Kuivisto	Finland	2:03.64	
9	1	Christina Hering	Germany	2:03.67	
10	3	Nadia Power	Ireland	2:04.04	
11	2	Lovisa Lindh	Sweden	2:04.12	
12	3	Daniela García	Spain	2:04.32	
13	2	Tanja Spill	Germany	2:04.43	
14	1	Eleonora Vandi	Italy	2:04.97	
15	1	Anna Wielgosz	Poland	2:05.29	
16	3	Irene Baldessari	Italy	2:06.36	
17	2	Selina Rutz-Büchel	Switzerland	2:07.47	
18	1	Vanessa Scaunet	Belgium	2:07.71	

=== Final ===
Rank	Athlete	Nationality	Time	Note
1st place, gold medalist(s)	Keely Hodgkinson	Great Britain	2:03.88	
2nd place, silver medalist(s)	Joanna Jóźwik	Poland	2:04.00	
3rd place, bronze medalist(s)	Angelika Cichocka	Poland	2:04.15	
4	Ellie Baker	Great Britain	2:04.40	
5	Lore Hoffmann	Switzerland	2:04.84	
6	Isabelle Boffey	Great Britain	2:07.26	
