= 2017 European Athletics U23 Championships – Women's 800 metres =

The women's 800 metres event at the 2017 European Athletics U23 Championships was held in Bydgoszcz, Poland, at Zdzisław Krzyszkowiak Stadium on 13 and 15 July.

== Medalists ==
Gold	Renée Eykens; Belgium
Silver	Aníta Hinriksdóttir; Iceland
Bronze	Hannah Segrave; Great Britain

== Results ==
=== Heats ===
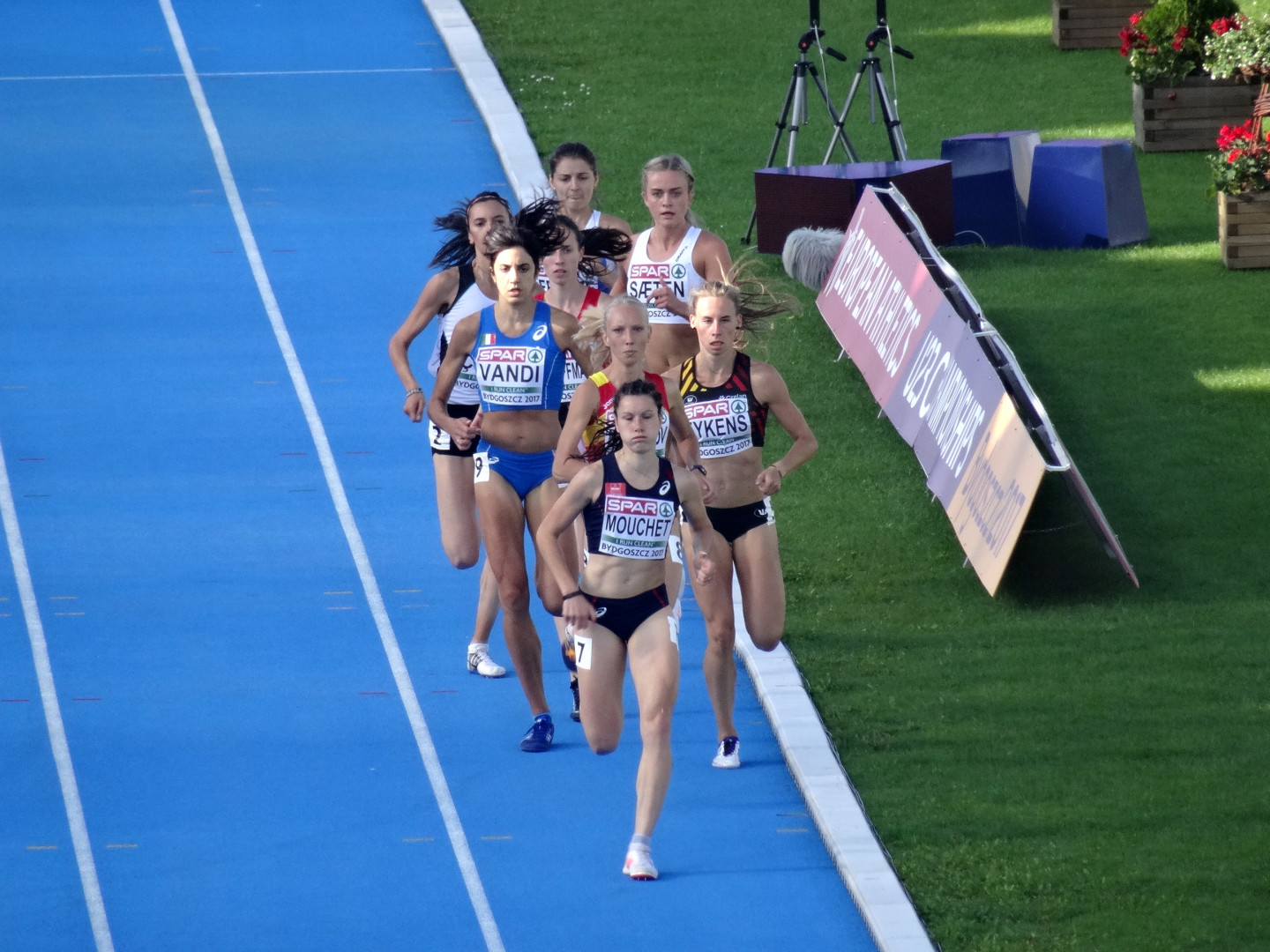
Heat 1

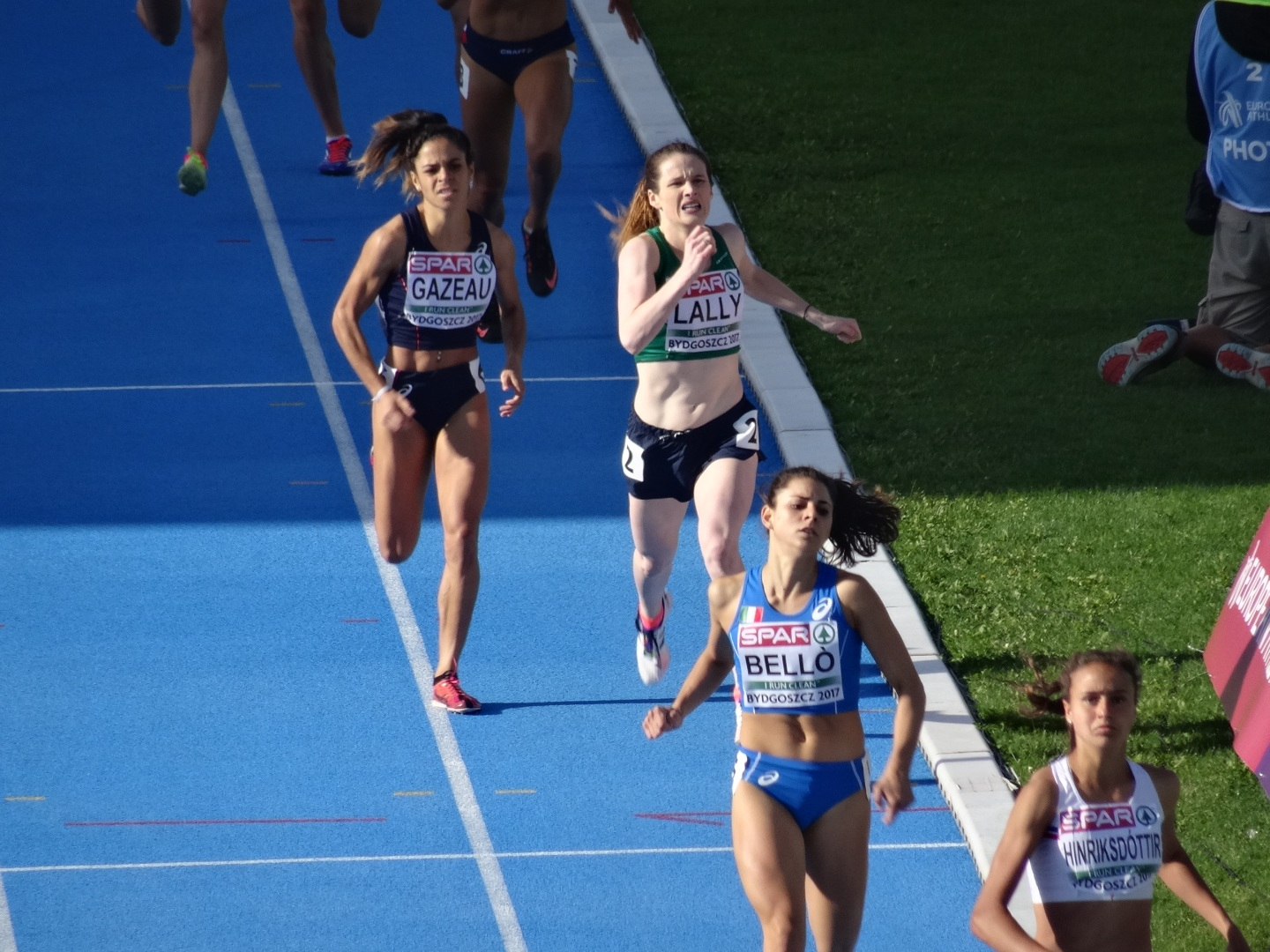
Heat 2

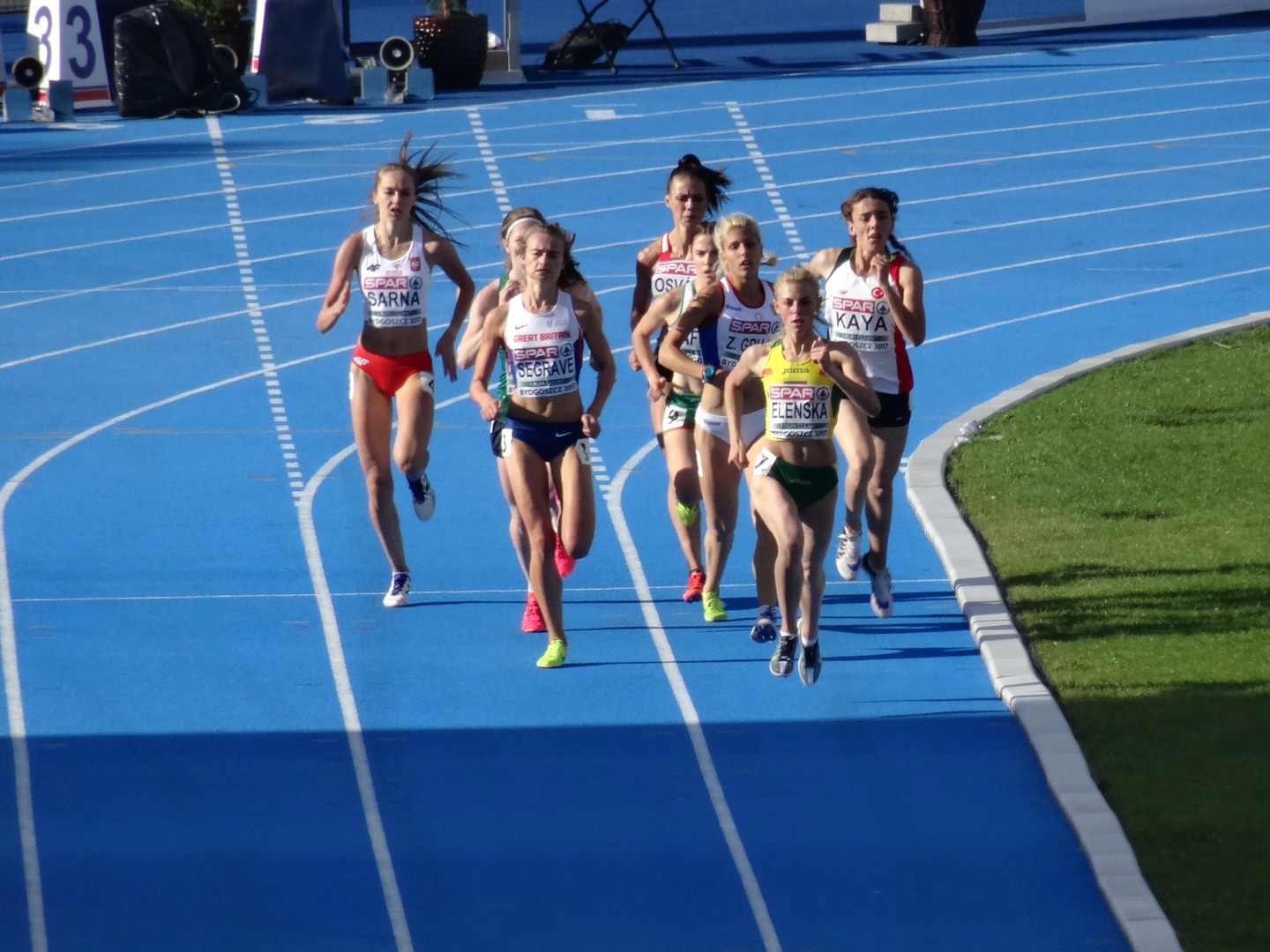
Heat 3

14 July

Qualification rule: First 2 (Q) and the next 2 fastest (q) qualified for the final.

Rank	Heat	Name	Nationality	Time	Notes
1	2	Aníta Hinriksdóttir	Iceland	2:03.58	Q
2	2	Elena Bellò	Italy	2:04.40	Q
3	1	Renée Eykens	Belgium	2:04.55	Q
4	1	Lore Hoffmann	Switzerland	2:04.60	Q, PB
5	1	Charlotte Mouchet	France	2:05.16	q
6	2	Alanna Lally	Ireland	2:05.54	q, PB
7	3	Hannah Segrave	Great Britain	2:05.54	Q
8	2	Corane Gazeau	France	2:05.73	
9	3	Síofra Cléirigh Büttner	Ireland	2:06.62	Q
10	1	Zoya Naumov	Spain	2:06.24	
11	3	Monika Elenska	Lithuania	2:06.42	
12	3	Salomé Alfonso	Portugal	2:07.10	
13	2	Mina Marie Anglero	Norway	2:07.11	PB
14	1	Amalie Sæten	Norway	2:07.66	SB
15	1	Eleonora Vandi	Italy	2:07.69	
16	2	Vytautė Pabiržytė	Lithuania	2:07.76	PB
17	3	Angelika Sarna	Poland	2:08.06	
18	2	Natalya Pyrozhenko	Ukraine	2:08.08	
19	2	Vendula Hluchá	Czech Republic	2:08.21	
20	3	Krisztina Osváth	Hungary	2:09.07	
21	3	Zorana Grujić	Serbia	2:09.86	
22	1	Ludmila Frunze	Moldova	2:11.00	
23	1	Damla Çelik	Turkey	2:14.15	
24	3	Rüya Kaya	Turkey	2:16.28	

=== Final ===
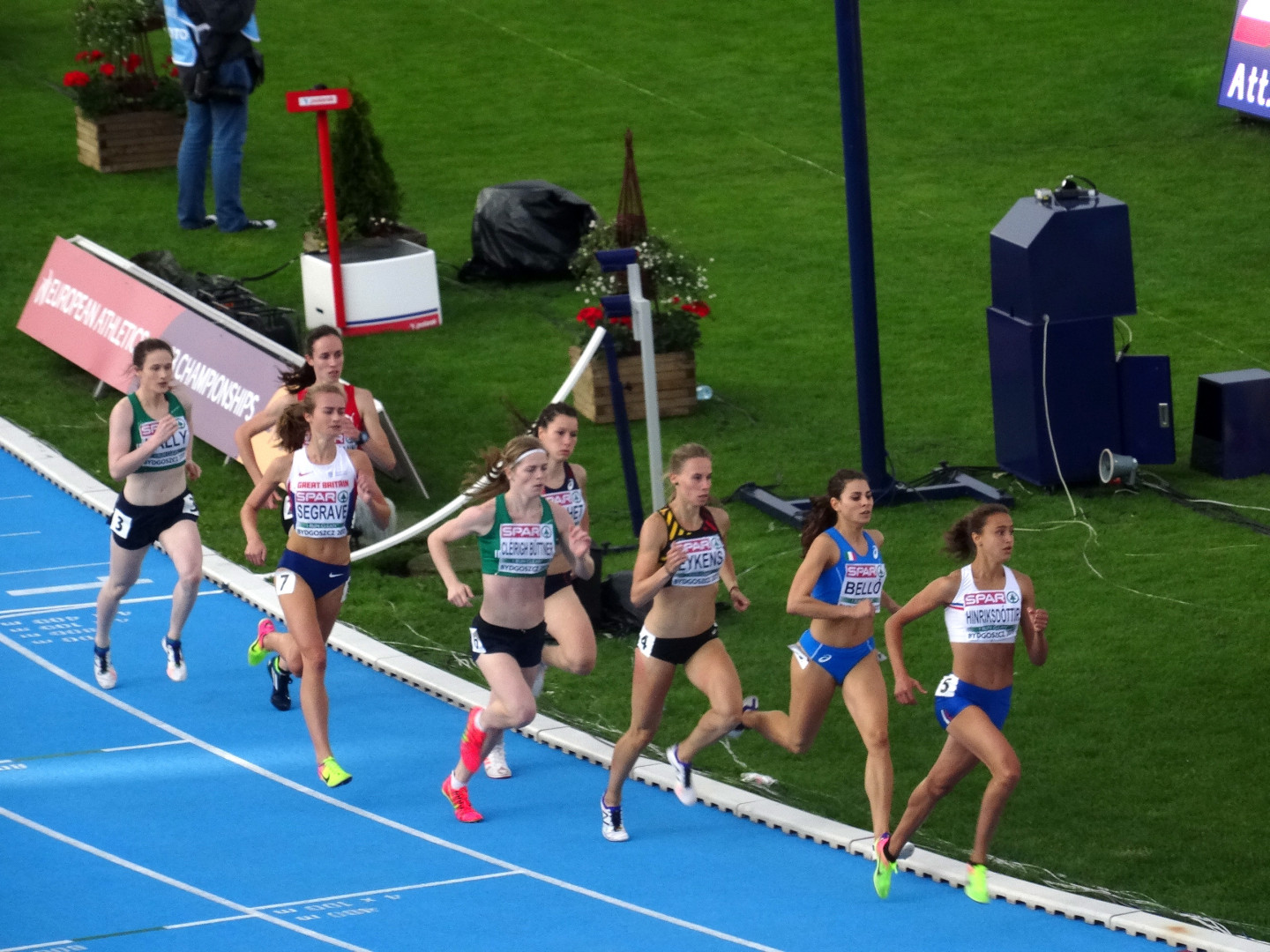
The final

15 July

Rank	Name	Nationality	Time	Notes
1st place, gold medalist(s)	Renée Eykens	Belgium	2:04.73	
2nd place, silver medalist(s)	Aníta Hinriksdóttir	Iceland	2:05.02	
3rd place, bronze medalist(s)	Hannah Segrave	Great Britain	2:05.53	
4	Alanna Lally	Ireland	2:05.63	
5	Lore Hoffmann	Switzerland	2:05.65	
6	Elena Bellò	Italy	2:05.96	
7	Síofra Cléirigh Büttner	Ireland	2:06.40	
8	Charlotte Mouchet	France	2:06.94	
