= Athletics at the 2019 Summer Universiade – Women's 800 metres =

The women's 800 metres event at the 2019 Summer Universiade was held on 8, 9 and 10 July at the Stadio San Paolo in Naples.

== Medalists ==
Gold	Silver	Bronze
Catriona Bisset; Australia	Christina Hering; Germany	Docus Ajok; Uganda

== Results ==
=== Heats ===
Qualification: First 4 in each heat (Q) and next 4 fastest (q) qualified for the semifinals.

Rank	Heat	Name	Nationality	Time	Notes
1	4	Catriona Bisset	Australia	2:05.13	Q
2	4	Katharina Trost	Germany	2:05.75	Q
3	4	Mathilde Jensen	Denmark	2:06.11	Q, PB
4	5	Eleonora Vandi	Italy	2:06.13	Q
5	5	Morgan Mitchell	Australia	2:06.17	Q
6	5	Docus Ajok	Uganda	2:06.22	Q, SB
7	5	Renée Eykens	Belgium	2:06.29	Q
8	4	Rachel Pocratsky	United States	2:06.45	Q
9	5	Alanna Lally	Ireland	2:06.74	q
10	3	Ayano Shiomi	Japan	2:06.77	Q
11	3	Síofra Cléirigh Büttner	Ireland	2:06.78	Q
12	3	Christina Hering	Germany	2:06.81	Q
13	5	Varvara Lissichkina	Kazakhstan	2:06.91	q, PB
14	4	Brittany Aveni	United States	2:07.42	q
15	2	Mari Smith	Great Britain	2:07.66	Q
16	3	Vera Hoffmann	Luxembourg	2:07.66	Q
17	2	Maïté Bouchard	Canada	2:07.72	Q
18	2	Charlotte Mouchet	France	2:08.05	Q
19	2	Lenuta Simiuc	Romania	2:08.16	Q, PB
20	1	Jenna Westaway	Canada	2:08.22	Q
21	4	Niene Muller	South Africa	2:08.33	q
22	1	Monika Elenska	Lithuania	2:08.64	Q
23	1	Lore Hoffmann	Switzerland	2:08.92	Q
24	1	Weronika Wyka	Poland	2:08.93	Q
25	1	Renata Vocásková	Czech Republic	2:09.26	
26	1	Dagmar Olsen	Denmark	2:10.32	
27	4	Harmilan Bains	India	2:11.41	
28	2	Madeleine Björlin-Delmar	Sweden	2:11.48	
29	3	Tanner Ealum	United States	2:12.06	
30	3	Stella Pearless	New Zealand	2:13.16	
31	2	Salomey Agyei	Ghana	2:13.33	
32	1	Jeniffer Nyakato	Uganda	2:14.25	
33	5	Nishanth Kalumarakkalage	Sri Lanka	2:20.15	
34	4	Madjiguene Mbaye	Senegal	2:21.38	PB
35	5	Mojca Centrih	Slovenia	2:22.83	
36	3	Clarice Diatta	Senegal	2:27.08	
37	2	Bertha Maseka	Zambia	2:40.72	
	1	Eyerusalem Alemne	Ethiopia	DNS	
	2	Rita Hajdini	Kosovo	DNS	
	3	Sara Dorthea Jensen	Norway	DNS	

=== Semifinals ===
Qualification: First 2 in each heat (Q) and next 2 fastest (q) qualified for the final.

Rank	Heat	Name	Nationality	Time	Notes
1	1	Catriona Bisset	Australia	2:01.45	Q
2	3	Docus Ajok	Uganda	2:02.38	Q, SB
3	1	Renée Eykens	Belgium	2:02.55	Q
4	1	Lore Hoffmann	Switzerland	2:02.65	q
5	3	Morgan Mitchell	Australia	2:02.91	Q
6	3	Síofra Cléirigh Büttner	Ireland	2:03.00	q
7	3	Maïté Bouchard	Canada	2:03.18	
8	2	Christina Hering	Germany	2:03.36	Q
9	2	Jenna Westaway	Canada	2:03.42	Q
10	2	Mari Smith	Great Britain	2:03.44	
11	1	Ayano Shiomi	Japan	2:03.73	
12	3	Katharina Trost	Germany	2:04.23	
13	2	Eleonora Vandi	Italy	2:05.09	
14	2	Rachel Pocratsky	United States	2:06.14	
15	3	Weronika Wyka	Poland	2:06.31	
16	2	Alanna Lally	Ireland	2:06.36	
17	1	Vera Hoffmann	Luxembourg	2:06.73	
18	2	Varvara Lissichkina	Kazakhstan	2:07.69	
19	1	Charlotte Mouchet	France	2:07.95	
20	3	Brittany Aveni	United States	2:08.31	
21	1	Mathilde Jensen	Denmark	2:08.69	PB
22	3	Monika Elenska	Lithuania	2:08.98	
23	2	Niene Muller	South Africa	2:11.22	
	1	Lenuta Simiuc	Romania	DNF	

=== Final ===
Official Video

Rank	Name	Nationality	Time	Notes
1st place, gold medalist(s)	Catriona Bisset	Australia	2:01.20	
2nd place, silver medalist(s)	Christina Hering	Germany	2:01.87	
3rd place, bronze medalist(s)	Docus Ajok	Uganda	2:02.31	SB
4	Lore Hoffmann	Switzerland	2:02.58	
5	Jenna Westaway	Canada	2:02.65	
6	Renée Eykens	Belgium	2:02.71	
7	Síofra Cléirigh Büttner	Ireland	2:03.20	
8	Morgan Mitchell	Australia	2:04.19	
