= 2015 European Athletics Indoor Championships – Women's 800 metres =

The women's 800 metres event at the 2015 European Athletics Indoor Championships was held on 6 March at 12:15 (heats), on 7 March at 18:00 (semifinals) and on 8 March at 15:15 (final) local time.

== Medalists ==
Gold	Silver	Bronze
Selina Büchel; Switzerland	Nataliya Lupu; Ukraine	Joanna Jóźwik; Poland

== Results ==
=== Heats ===
Qualification: First 2 of each heat (Q) and the next 4 fastest (q) qualified for the semifinals.

Rank	Heat	Athlete	Nationality	Time	Note
1	1	Yekaterina Poistogova	Russia	2:01.44	Q, SB
2	1	Aníta Hinriksdóttir	Iceland	2:01.56	Q, AJR, NR
3	2	Selina Büchel	Switzerland	2:01.95	Q
4	2	Rénelle Lamote	France	2:02.10	Q
5	2	Nataliya Lupu	Ukraine	2:02.18	q, SB
6	4	Jenny Meadows	Great Britain	2:02.59	Q
7	1	Ciara Everard	Ireland	2:02.69	q, SB
8	4	Lenka Masná	Czech Republic	2:03.25	Q, SB
9	2	Anna Silvander	Sweden	2:04.28	q
10	4	Stina Troest	Denmark	2:04.30	q
11	3	Joanna Jóźwik	Poland	2:04.50	Q
12	1	Trine Mjåland	Norway	2:04.71	PB
13	3	Anastasiya Bazdyreva	Russia	2:04.92	Q
14	3	Shelayna Oskan-Clarke	Great Britain	2:05.08	
15	3	Zuzana Hejnová	Czech Republic	2:05.34	
16	4	Eleni Filandra	Greece	2:05.52	
17	3	Victoria Sauleda	Spain	2:05.63	
18	1	Syntia Ellward	Poland	2:05.68	
19	4	Mariya Nikolayeva	Russia	2:07.16	
20	2	Pavla Habovštiaková	Slovakia	2:10.38	

=== Semifinals ===
Qualification: First 3 of each semifinal (Q) qualified directly for the final.

Rank	Heat	Athlete	Nationality	Time	Note
1	1	Selina Büchel	Switzerland	2:01.92	Q
2	1	Aníta Hinriksdóttir	Iceland	2:02.31	Q
3	1	Jenny Meadows	Great Britain	2:02.40	Q
4	1	Anna Silvander	Sweden	2:04.24	
5	1	Ciara Everard	Ireland	2:06.14	
6	2	Nataliya Lupu	Ukraine	2:08.15	Q
7	2	Joanna Jóźwik	Poland	2:08.47	Q
8	2	Yekaterina Poistogova	Russia	2:08.72	Q
9	2	Rénelle Lamote	France	2:09.06	
10	2	Stina Troest	Denmark	2:10.25	
11	2	Lenka Masná	Czech Republic	2:10.36	
	1	Anastasiya Bazdyreva	Russia	DQ	R163.2, R163.4

=== Final ===
Rank	Athlete	Nationality	Time	Note
1st place, gold medalist(s)	Selina Büchel	Switzerland	2:01.95	
DSQ	Yekaterina Poistogova	Russia	~~2:01.99~~	doping
2nd place, silver medalist(s)	Nataliya Lupu	Ukraine	2:02.25	
3rd place, bronze medalist(s)	Joanna Jóźwik	Poland	2:02.45	
4	Aníta Hinriksdóttir	Iceland	2:02.74	
	Jenny Meadows	Great Britain	DNS	
