= Northern Illinois Huskies track and field =

American college track and field team

- University: Northern Illinois University
- Head coach: Connie Teaberry
- Conference: MAC
- Location: DeKalb, Illinois
- Outdoor track: NIU Soccer and Track & Field Complex
- Nickname: Huskies
- Colors: Cardinal and black

The Northern Illinois Huskies track and field team is the track and field program that represents Northern Illinois University. The Huskies compete in NCAA Division I as a member of the Mid-American Conference. The team is based in DeKalb, Illinois, at the NIU Soccer and Track & Field Complex.

The program is coached by Connie Teaberry. The track and field program officially encompasses four teams because the NCAA considers men's and women's indoor track and field and outdoor track and field as separate sports.

All Northern Illinois men's and women's track and cross country teams were cut following the 1981-82 season for budgetary reasons after Bill Mallory replaced athletic director Deacon Davis. The women's track teams returned for the 2000-01 school year.

NIU's top performer at NCAAs was Larry Stachwell, who finished 4th in the weight throw at the 1975 NCAA Indoor Track and Field Championships. The team was said to have been strongest in the throwing events. In 2024, middle-distance runner Lorena Martín, who won the 2017 Mid-American Conference 800 m championship for the Huskies, qualified for the Paris Olympic 800 m.

== Postseason ==
As of August 2025, a total of 4 men and 2 women have achieved individual first-team All-American status for the team at the Division I men's outdoor, women's outdoor, men's indoor, or women's indoor national championships (using the modern criteria of top-8 placing regardless of athlete nationality).

First team NCAA All-Americans
Team	Championships	Name	Event	Place	Ref.
Men's	1936 Outdoor	Walt Peters	Javelin throw	7th	
Men's	1973 Indoor	Richard Bilder	Shot put	5th	
Men's	1973 Outdoor	Rich Bilder	Shot put	7th	
Men's	1975 Indoor	Larry Stachwell	Weight throw	4th	
Women's	2017 Outdoor	Hope Schmelzle	3000 meters steeplechase	6th	
Women's	2018 Indoor	Jehvania Whyte	Triple jump	8th	
Women's	2018 Outdoor	Jehvania Whyte	Triple jump	7th	

== See also ==
- Category:Northern Illinois Huskies men's track and field athletes (1)
- Category:Northern Illinois Huskies women's track and field athletes (1)
