= Naomi Korir =

Kenyan athlete

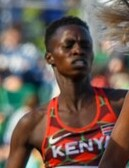

Personal information
- Nationality: Kenya
- Born: 1 September 1998 (age 28)

Sport
- Sport: Athletics

Achievements and titles
- Personal best: 800m: 1:59.19 (2024)
Medal record
Women's athletics
Representing Kenya
African Championships
Gold medal – first place	2022 Mauritius	4x400m relay
World Relays
Silver medal – second place	2021 Chorzów	2×2×400 m relay
World Road Running Championships
Bronze medal – third place	2026 Copenhagen	Mile mixed team

Naomi Korir (born 1 September 1998) is a Kenyan track and field athlete who competes as a middle-distance runner.

== Biography ==
In 2021, alongside Ferguson Rotich, Korir took second place in the Mixed 2x2x400m relay at the 2021 World Athletics Relays in Silesia, Poland.

Korir competed for Kenya in the 800 metres at the 2022 World Indoor Championships in Belgrade, Serbia. That summer, she was a finalist at the African Championships 800 metres race in 2022 held at Saint Pierre, Mauritius. She also won a silver medal in the women's 4 x 400 metres relay at the championships.

Korir competed for Kenya over 800 metres at the 2023 World Championships in Budapest, Hungary. The following year, Korir competed for Kenya at the 2024 World Indoor Championships in Glasgow, Scotland. In May 2024, she ran a personal best 1:59.19 in Italy.

In June 2026, Korir was runner-up over 800 metres to defending champion Lilian Odira at the Kenyan Athletics Championships. Later at the championships, she returned to win the 1500 metres title in 4:08.57. Subsequently, she was a finalist in the mile at the 2026 Commonwealth Games in Glasgow, Scotland, placing fifth overall. Competing in the mile run at the World Athletics Road Running Championships on 19 September 2026, Korir finished fifth in a personal best of 4:29.15, and won the bronze medal in the mixed team competition.
