= 2021 World Athletics Relays – Mixed 2 × 2 × 400 metres relay =

Mixed 2 × 2 × 400 metres relay at the 2021 World Athletics Relays
- Venue: Silesian Stadium
- Dates: 1 May 2021
- Nations: 6

Medalists
gold medal	Joanna Jóźwik (W); Patryk Dobek (M)	Poland
silver medal	Naomi Korir (W); Ferguson Rotich (M)	Kenya
bronze medal	Anita Horvat (W); Žan Rudolf (M)	Slovenia

The Mixed 2 × 2 × 400 metres relay at the 2021 World Athletics Relays was held at Silesian Stadium on 1 May. It was the second time that this event was held at the World Athletics Relays, after being first held in 2019. Each team had to comprise one man and one woman, who would each run twice, but could be lined up in any order.

== Records ==
Prior to the competition, the records were as follows:

World record	United States (Ce'Aira Brown. Donavan Brazier)	3:36.92	Yokohama, Japan	11 May 2019
Championship record	United States (Ce'Aira Brown. Donavan Brazier)	3:36.92	Yokohama, Japan	11 May 2019

== Results ==
KEY:	WL	World leading	CR	Championship record	NR	National record	SB	Seasonal best

=== Final ===
Rank	Nation	Athletes	Time	Notes
1st place, gold medalist(s)	Poland	Joanna Jóźwik (W), Patryk Dobek (M)	3:40.92	NR
2nd place, silver medalist(s)	Kenya	Naomi Korir (W), Ferguson Rotich (M)	3:41.79	SB
3rd place, bronze medalist(s)	Slovenia	Anita Horvat (W), Žan Rudolf (M)	3:41.95	SB
4	Belarus	Ilona Velikanovich (W), Illia Karnavukhau (M)	3:48.06	NR
5	Portugal	Dorothé Évora (W), João Coelho (M)	3:51.69	SB
6	Slovakia	Daniela Ledecká (W), Patrik Dӧmӧtӧr (M)	3:54.01	SB
