= Natalia Romero (Spanish athlete) =

Spanish runner

Personal information
- Nationality: Spanish
- Born: Natalia Romero Franco; 17 November 1988 (age 37) Jaén, Spain
- Height: 171 cm (5 ft 7 in)
- Weight: 59 kg (130 lb)

Sport
- Sport: Track and Field
- Events: 400m, 800m

Natalia Romero Franco (born 17 November 1988) is a Spanish runner. She is a multiple time national champion over 400 metres and 800 metres. She competed over 800 metres at the 2020 Olympic Games.

== Career ==
Romero was a 400 metres runner, and a double national champion indoors over 400m, who retrained as an 800 metres runner under the guidance of Pedro Jiménez, a professor of sports training methodology at the Rey Juan Carlos University in Madrid. Romero won her first national title over 800 metres at the Spanish Athletics Championships in 2019. Romero was named University Sportswoman of the Year in Spain in 2009. Romero was diagnosed with plantar fasciitis due to excessive use of a treadmill during the COVID-19 lockdown in 2020.

She won the 800 metres Spanish national title again at the 2021 Spanish Athletics Championships. She subsequently made her Olympic debut at the delayed 2020 Olympic Games in Tokyo, Japan in July 2021, competing over 800 metres, at the age of 33 years-old. She ran a personal best, and Balearic area record, of 2:01.16 in her qualifying heat to reach the semi-finals. In the semi-final, Romero ran just outside that for a time or 2:01.52, finishing eighth.

== Personal life ==
From Jaén, Andalusia, she later moved to Mallorca on the Balearic Islands. She has a PHD in physiotherapy, and is a professor in physiotherapy at the University of the Balearic Islands. In 2023, with colleagues from the university, she took a leading role in the launch the ACTITUD project, designed to help athletes learn to care for their pelvic floor.
