= Lorena Martín =

Spanish middle-distance runner

Personal information
- Born: 22 October 1996 (age 29) Salamanca, Spain
- Height: 1.71 m (5 ft 7 in)

Sport
- Country: Spain
- Sport: Athletics
- Event: 800 metres

Lorena Martín (born 22 October 1996) is a Spanish runner who specializes in the 800 metres.

In the 800 metres at the 2022 World Athletics Indoor Championships, she qualified for the final by .002 seconds. In the final, she finished 8th. She qualified for these Championships as Spanish national champion. This was her first major international championship.

Martín competed in the NCAA for the Northern Illinois Huskies track and field team, where she was the 2017 Mid-American Conference outdoor champion over 800 m. She qualified for the 2017 NCAA West preliminary in the 800 m but did not advance to the NCAA Division I Women's Outdoor Track and Field Championships.

== International competitions ==
Year	Competition	Venue	Position	Event	Time
Representing Spain
2022	World Indoor Championships	Belgrade, Serbia	8th	800 m i	2:03.93
2023	World Championships	Budapest, Hungary	36th (h)	800 m	2:01.25
2024	World Indoor Championships	Glasgow, United Kingdom	11th (sf)	800 m i	2:00.73
2024	European Championships	Rome, Italy	16th (h)	800 m	2:02.21
2024	Olympic Games	Paris, France	21st (rep)	800 m	2:03.04

== Personal bests ==
- 800 metres – 2:00.33 (Madrid 2024)
  - Indoor – 2:01.34 (Sabadell 2022)
- 1500 metres – 4:22.49 (Castellón de la Plana 2021)
