= Catriona Bisset =

Australian middle-distance runner

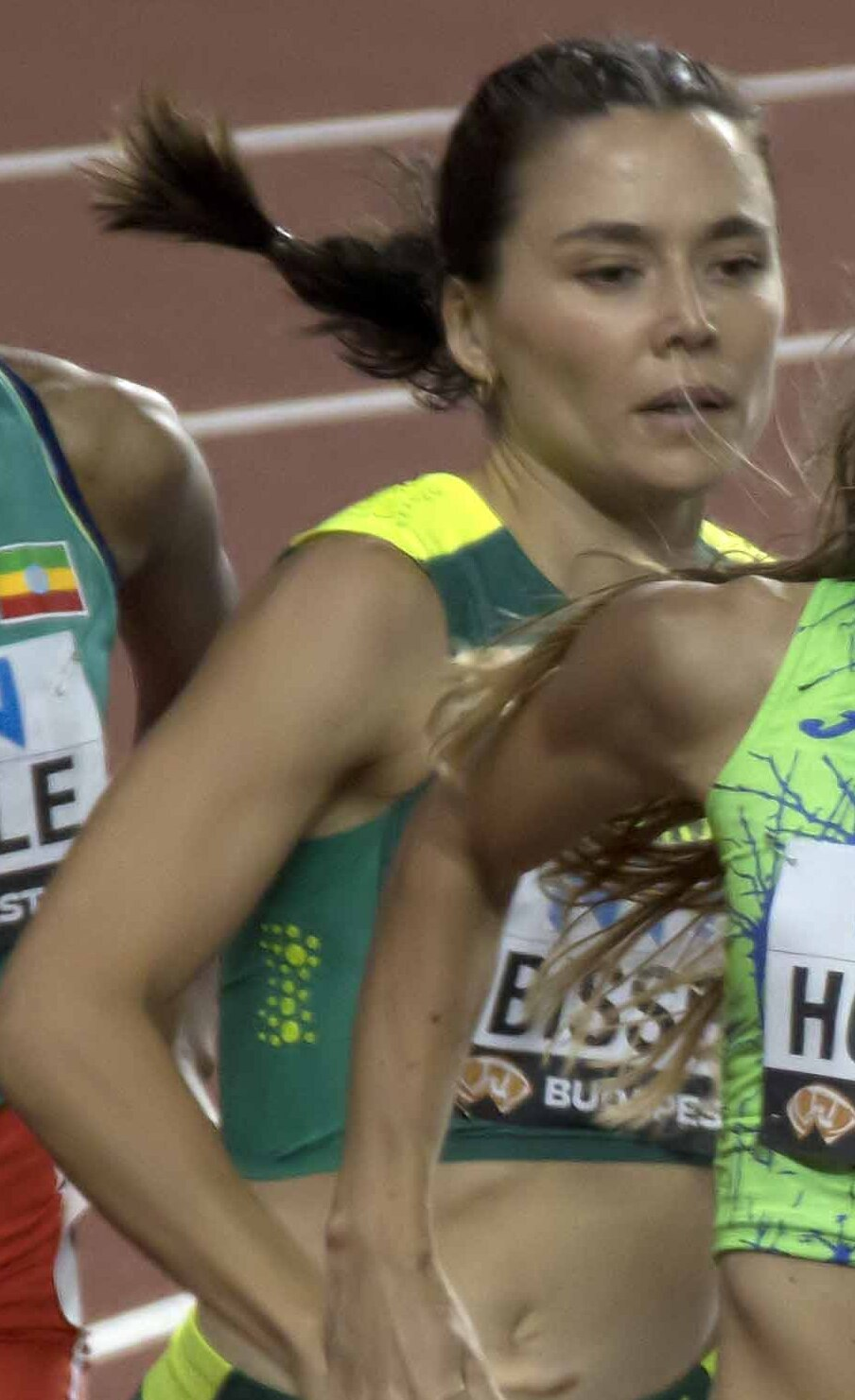
- Bisset in 2023

Personal information
- Full name: Catriona Li Bisset
- Born: 1 March 1994 (age 32) Newcastle, New South Wales, Australia
- Education: University of Melbourne
- Height: 1.69 m (5 ft 7 in)

Sport
- Country: Australia
- Sport: Athletics
- Event: Middle-distance running
- Coached by: Trevor Painter & Jenny Meadows (2024–); Ned Brophy-Williams (2021–24); Peter Fortune (2017–21)

Achievements and titles
- Personal bests: 800 m: 1:57.78 AR (London 2023); Indoors; 800 m: 1:59.46 i AR (Birmingham 2022)
Medal record
Women's athletics
Representing Australia
Summer Universiade
Gold medal – first place	2019 Naples	800 m
Oceania Championships
Gold medal – first place	2019 Townsville	800 m
World Relays
Silver medal – second place	2019 Yokohama	Mixed 2×2×400 m

Catriona Bisset
- Chinese: 李克勤
Transcriptions
Standard Mandarin
- Hanyu Pinyin: Lǐ Kèqín

Catriona Li Bisset (born 1 March 1994) is an Australian middle-distance runner who specialises in the 800 metres. She holds the Oceanian record for both indoors and outdoors in the event, and won the gold medal at the 2019 Universiade. Bisset has four individual Australian national titles.

== Career ==
=== Early years ===
Born in Newcastle and raised in Canberra, Bisset participated in Little Athletics from age six. She displayed potential as a youth, but withdrew from competition for several years as she improved her mental health. During her undergraduate studies at the University of New South Wales, she began training with University of Sydney head coach Dean Gleeson. She resumed racing in 2016. The following year, Bisset moved from Sydney to Melbourne, and Gleeson introduced her to Peter Fortune, best known as the coach of 400-metre sprinter Cathy Freeman.

=== 2019: Breakthrough season ===
Bisset rose to national prominence in 2019. After improving her personal best throughout the domestic season, she won the 800 metres at the Australian Athletics Championships in 2:00.48. One week later, she ran 1:59.78 at the UniSport National Championships to become the first Australian woman in a decade to break the two-minute barrier.

In May, Bisset was selected for her first national team, representing Australia at the World Relays. She and Josh Ralph placed second in the first-ever mixed 2 × 2 × 400 m relay. Bisset went on to win the 800 m at both the Oceania Championships and Summer Universiade. She made her Diamond League debut at the Anniversary Games in London in July, where she placed second behind Lynsey Sharp. Her time of 1:58.78 set a new Australian record, surpassing the 43-year-old record set by Charlene Rendina, and qualifying Bisset for the 2020 Tokyo Olympics.

Two months later, she competed at the Doha World Championships in Qatar, but was hampered by injury and did not progress beyond the heats.

=== 2020–21 ===
Bisset did not race internationally in 2020 due to COVID-19. However, this allowed her to continue aerobic training and fully recover from injury.

In the 2021 domestic season, she performed at a high level, including a second Olympic qualifier of 1:59.12 to win at the Queensland Track Classic in March. She also successfully defended her 800 m national title, officially securing her place on the Australian Olympic team. On her return to the European circuit in June, Bisset improved her national record at the Janusz Kusociński Memorial with a time of 1:58.09, which also broke the Oceanian record set by Toni Hodgkinson in 1996.

At the postponed Tokyo Olympics in July, Bisset ran 2:01.65 in the women's 800 m heats, narrowly missing her chance to advance. She ended her season in September by competing in her first Diamond League final, running 1:59.66 for seventh at Weltklasse Zürich. After the racing season, she began training with Linden Hall under the guidance of coach Ned Brophy-Williams.

=== 2022 ===
Bisset made her indoor debut at the Birmingham Indoor Grand Prix in February. She ran 1:59.46 for second behind Keely Hodgkinson, setting another national and Oceanian record in the process. She secured victories in the following two top-level World Indoor Tour meets, including the Copernicus Cup in Toruń, where she defeated Halimah Nakaayi. Later in March, Bisset placed fifth at the World Indoor Championships in Belgrade with a time of 2:01.24.

Back outdoors in Australia, she ran 1:59.83 to win her third consecutive national title. On the Diamond League circuit, she ran sub-two minutes in Rome, Oslo and Stockholm, including a season's best time of 1:58.54 to finish third in Stockholm behind Mary Moraa and Hodgkinson.

In the first round of the World Championships held in Eugene, Oregon in July, Bisset was knocked to the track and spiked by a competitor. Nonetheless, she completed the race and was added to the semi-final field by the race jury. The following day, she ran with 11 stitches in her thigh and a swollen knee, but did not advance to the final. Despite her injuries, she competed at the Birmingham Commonwealth Games in August, placing fifth in a time of 1:59.41.

=== 2023 ===
In February, Bisset ran three World Indoor Tour races, including another indoor sub-two minutes. Returning to Australia, she won the Brisbane Track Classic in 1:59.74. She then won her fourth national title in a meet record of 1:58.32, the fastest time by an Australian on home soil. In July, Bisset again lowered her national record to 1:57.78 in London.

At the end of her season, Track & Field News ranked Bisset seventh in the women's 800 metres, the first Australian to feature in the top-10 since Rendina in 1974.

=== 2024 ===
Bisset faced strong domestic competition for a place on the Olympic team. After failing to defend her national title, running 1:59.87 behind Claudia Hollingsworth, Abbey Caldwell and Bendere Oboya, Bisset went on to run a season's best of 1:58.12 at the London Diamond League in July. She competed in the 2024 Paris Olympics, where she drew attention among Hong Kong citizens due to sharing the same Chinese name as the singer Hacken Lee. At the end of her season, Bisset joined M11 Track Club in Manchester, coached by Trevor Painter and Jenny Meadows.

== Statistics ==
=== International competitions ===
Representing Australia
Year	Competition	Venue	Position	Event	Time
2019	World Relays	Yokohama, Japan	2nd	2 × 2 × 400 m relay	3:37.61
2019	Summer Universiade	Naples, Italy	1st	800 m	2:01.20
2019	World Championships	Doha, Qatar	39th (h)	800 m	2:05.33
2021	Olympic Games	Tokyo, Japan	21st (h)	800 m	2:01.65
2022	World Indoor Championships	Belgrade, Serbia	5th	800 m i	2:01.24
2022	World Championships	Eugene, United States	26th (sf)	800 m	2:05.20
2022	Commonwealth Games	Birmingham, United Kingdom	5th	800 m	1:59.41
2023	World Championships	Budapest, Hungary	12th (sf)	800 m	1:59.94
2024	World Indoor Championships	Glasgow, United Kingdom	8th (sf)	800 m i	2:00.13
2024	Olympic Games	Paris, France	17th (rep)	800 m	2:02.35

=== Oceanian and National titles ===
- Oceania Area Championships in Athletics
  - 800 metres: 2019
- Australian Athletics Championships
  - 800 metres: 2019, 2021, 2022, 2023
  - 4 × 400 m relay: 2019, 2021

== Personal life ==
Bisset studied a postgraduate degree in architecture and diploma in Chinese language at the University of Melbourne. Her mother was born in Nanjing, China. Part of her schooling was at Melrose High School in the Woden Valley area of Canberra.
