= Joanna Jóźwik =

Polish middle-distance runner (born 1991)

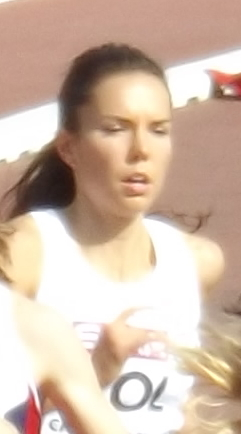
- Jóźwik in 2015

Personal information
- Born: 30 January 1991 (age 35) Wałbrzych, Poland
- Height: 1.67 m (5 ft 6 in)

Sport
- Country: Poland
- Sport: Athletics
- Event: 800 metres
- Club: AZS-AWF Katowice (2019–2023); AZS-AWF Warszawa (2013–2018); KKS Victoria Stalowa Wola (2006–2012)
- Coached by: Jakub Ogonowski, Andrzej Wołkowycki, Stanisław Anioł
- Retired: 2023
Medal record
Women's athletics
Representing Poland
World Relays
Gold medal – first place	2021 Chorzów	2×2×400 m relay
European Championships
Bronze medal – third place	2014 Zürich	800 m
European Indoor Championships
Silver medal – second place	2021 Toruń	800 m
Bronze medal – third place	2015 Prague	800 m
European Team Championships
Silver medal – second place	2015 Cheboksary	800 m

Joanna Jóźwik (born 30 January 1991 in Wałbrzych) is a retired Polish middle-distance runner who specialized in the 800 metres. She won the bronze medal at the 2014 European Athletics Championships. Indoors, at the European Indoor Championships, Jóźwik earned bronze in 2015 and silver in 2021.

She placed fifth at the 2016 Rio Olympics. Jóżwik is the Polish indoor record holder for the 800 m, and won four national titles over the distance.

== Biography ==
On 16 August 2014, Joanna Jóźwik won the bronze medal in the 800 metres at the European Championships held in Zürich.

Her personal outdoor best for this distance is 1:57.37, set in the final of the 2016 Rio Olympics. After placing fifth in that final in a race she declared herself the silver medalist stating, "I'm glad I'm the first European, and the second white"

== Statistics ==
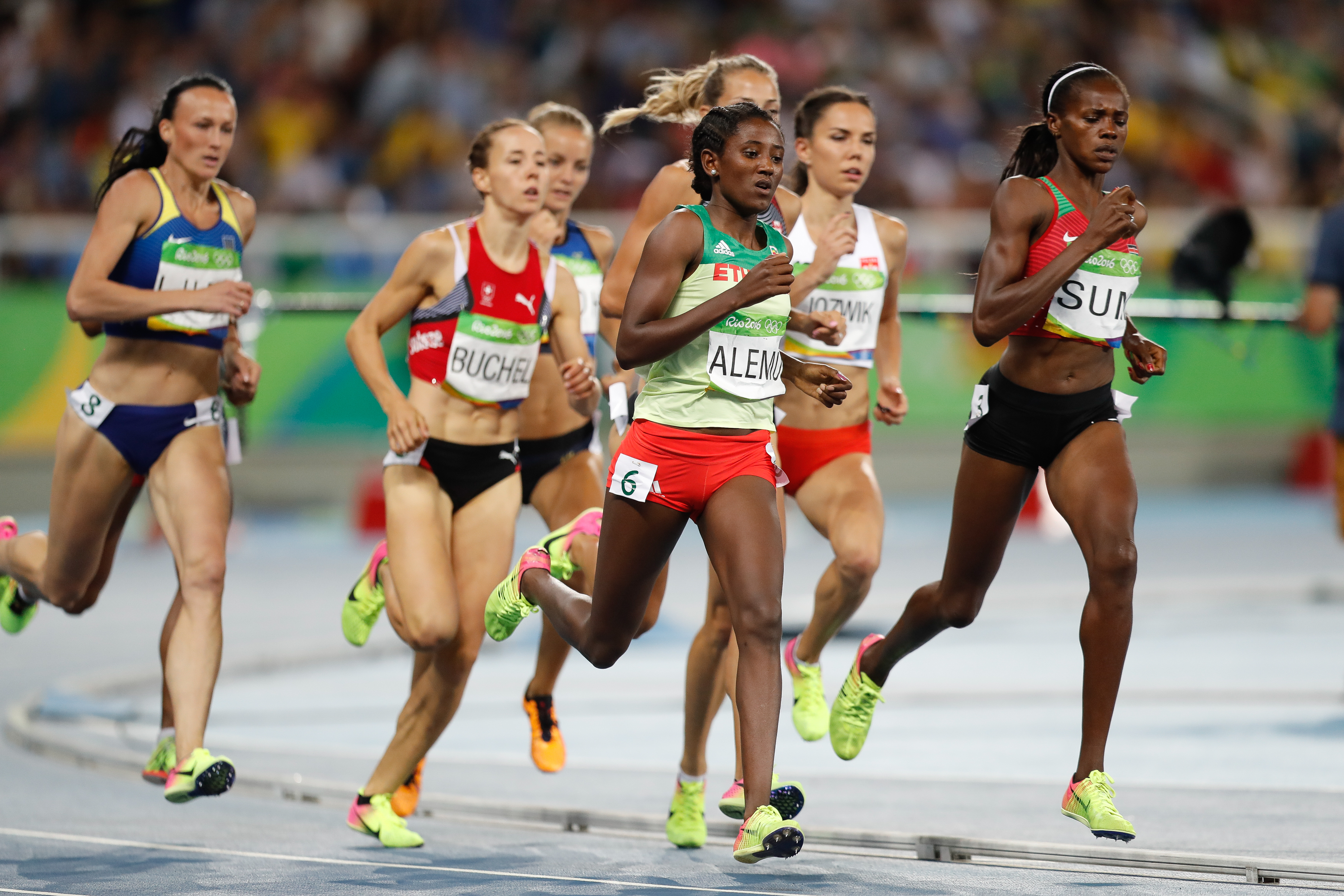
Jóźwnik (second from the right) in the 800 m semi-final at the 2016 Rio Olympics

=== International competitions ===
Representing Poland
Year	Competition	Venue	Position	Event	Time
2010	World Junior Championships	Moncton, Canada	11th (sf)	800 m	2:05.09
2010	World Junior Championships	Moncton, Canada	8th	4 × 400 m relay	3:42.70
2011	European U23 Championships	Ostrava, Czech Republic	9th (h)	800 m	2:06.07
2013	European U23 Championships	Tampere, Finland	8th	800 m	2:15.22
2014	European Championships	Zürich, Switzerland	3rd	800 m	1:59.63
2015	European Indoor Championships	Prague, Czech Republic	3rd	800 m	2:02.45
2015	European Team Championships Super League	Cheboksary, Russia	2nd	800 m	2:00.30
2015	World Championships	Beijing, China	7th	800 m	1:59.09
2016	European Championships	Amsterdam, Netherlands	6th	800 m	2:00.57
2016	Olympic Games	Rio de Janeiro, Brazil	5th	800 m	1:57.37
2017	European Team Championships Super League	Lille, France	4th	800 m	2:03.81
2017	World Championships	London, United Kingdom	20th (sf)	800 m	2:01.91
2021	European Indoor Championships	Toruń, Poland	2nd	800 m	2:04.00
2021	World Relays	Chorzów, Poland	1st	2x2x400 m relay	3:40.92 AB
2021	Olympic Games	Tokyo, Japan	21st (sf)	800 m	2:02.32

=== Personal bests ===
Event	Performance	Place	Date	Notes
200 metres	24.16	(Poland) Sosnowiec	22 July 2014	
200 metres indoor	24.96	(Poland) Spała	7 February 2015	
400 metres	53.08	(Poland) Biała Podlaska	6 September 2014	
400 metres indoor	54.13	(Poland) Toruń	6 February 2019	
600 metres	1:25.04	(Poland) Szczecin	9 August 2015	
800 metres	1:57.37	(Brazil) Rio de Janeiro	20 August 2016	
800 metres indoor	1:59.29	(Poland) Toruń	10 February 2017	NR
1000 metres	2:34.93	(Poland) Sopot	28 July 2016	
1000 metres indoor	2:42.36	(Poland) Spała	26 January 2014	

=== National titles ===
- Polish Athletics Championships
  - 800 metres: 2014, 2015, 2020
  - 4 × 400 m relay: 2013, 2014, 2015, 2017, 2019
- Polish Indoor Athletics Championships
  - 800 metres: 2021
