= Tanja Spill =

German middle-distance runner

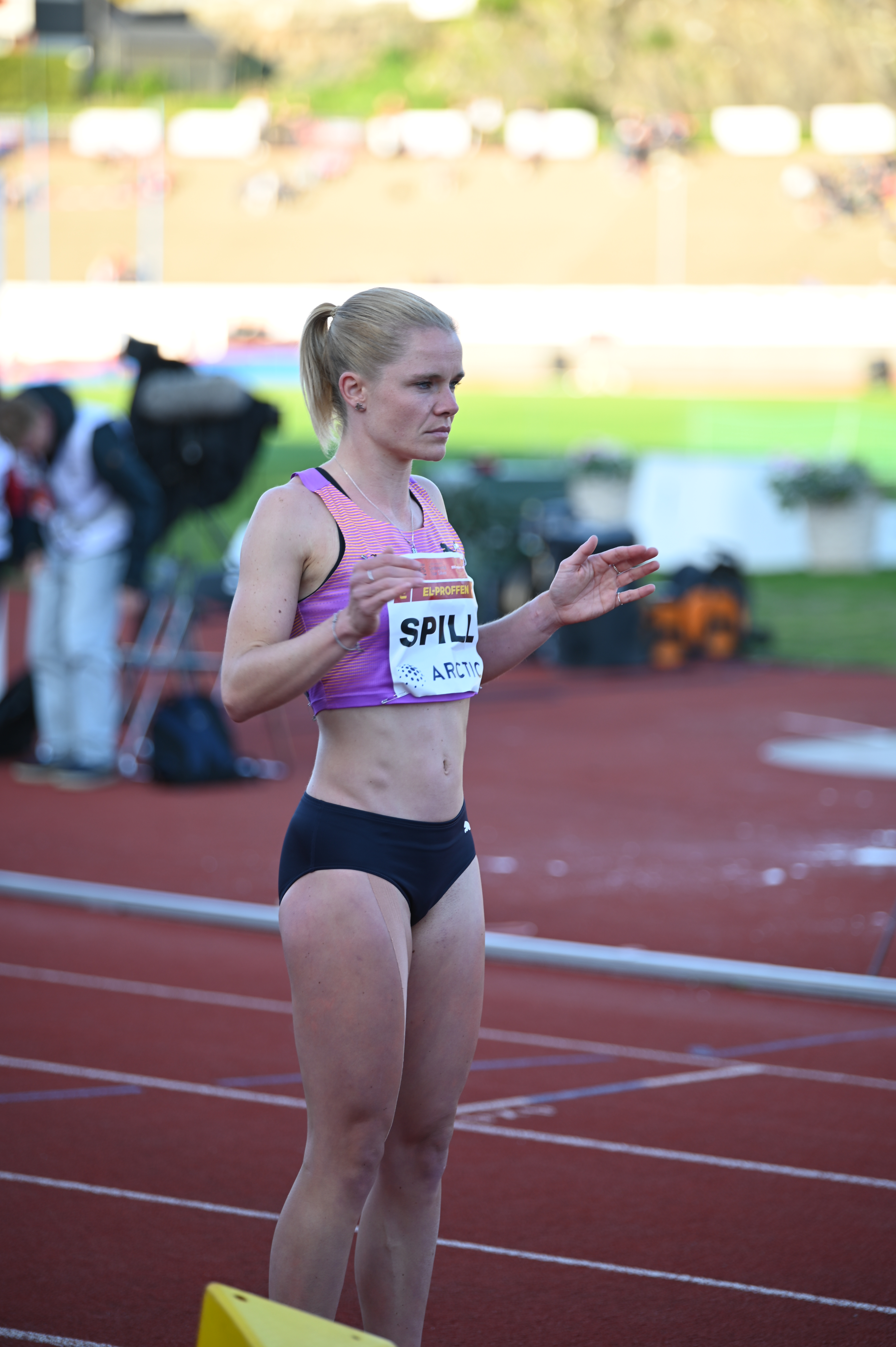
- Spill in 2026

Personal information
- Nationality: German
- Born: 16 December 1995 (age 30)

Sport
- Sport: Athletics
- Event: 800 metres

Tanja Spill (born 16 December 1995) is a German athlete. She competed in the women's 800 metres event at the 2021 European Athletics Indoor Championships.
