= Alexandra Bell (athlete) =

British middle-distance runner

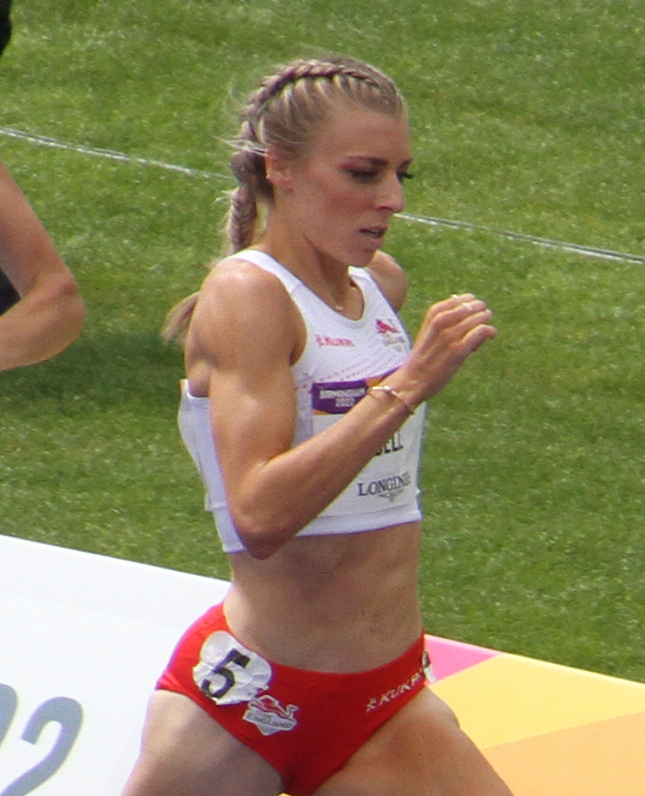
- Bell at the 2022 Commonwealth Games

Personal information
- Born: 4 November 1992 (age 33) Leeds, England
- Height: 166 cm (5 ft 5 in)
- Weight: 55 kg (121 lb)

Sport
- Country: Great Britain; England
- Sport: Athletics
- Event: 800 metres

Achievements and titles
- Olympic finals: 2020
- World finals: 2019, 2022
- Commonwealth finals: 2018, 2022
Medal record
Women's athletics
Representing Great Britain
European Cross Country Championships
| Gold medal – first place | 2019 Lisbon | Mixed relay |
| Gold medal – first place | 2021 Dublin | Mixed relay |

Alexandra Bell (born 4 November 1992) is a British athlete who competed for Great Britain in the 800 metres event at the delayed 2020 Summer Olympics, and for England at the 2018 and 2022 Commonwealth Games.

== Career ==
Alexandra Bell competes for Pudsey & Bramley Athletics Club.

In 2016, she competed at her first Diamond League fixture, finishing seventh, and was the fifth fastest British 800 metres runner.

In 2018, she competed for the first time at the Great Edinburgh International Cross Country.

Bell finished fifth in the 800 metres at the 2018 Commonwealth Games in Gold Coast, Australia. In May that year, she became the first British woman to run 800 metres in under 2 minutes at the British Milers’ Club Grand Prix. In July, she was not selected for the 800 m event at the European Championships, despite having run faster than two of the athletes selected.

In September 2019, Bell won the 800 m representing Europe in "The Match", a team competition against the US in Minsk, Belarus. She reached the semi-final of the 800 m at the 2019 World Championships in Doha, setting a personal best time of 1:59.82. In December that year, she was critical of UK Athletics after not being included on the elite lottery funding list.

In May 2021, Bell ran faster than the 800 m Olympic qualifying time at the Belfast Irish Milers. The event did not award points towards Olympic qualification, as it didn't have a European Permit. She finished fifth at the 2021 British Athletics Championships event, which doubled up as the Olympic trial event. Bell was not initially selected for the delayed 2020 Tokyo Olympics, when the athletics squad was announced in June 2021. On 8 July, she was selected for the 800 metres event at the Games, replacing Laura Muir, who had qualified for the event but later decided not to compete as she wanted to focus on the 1500 metres race. In the Olympic final, Bell finished seventh in a personal best time of 1:57.66.

Bell was eliminated in the semi-finals of the 800 m at the 2022 World Championships in Eugene, Oregon in July. She was selected for the 800 metres event at the Commonwealth Games held in August in Birmingham that year, and finished sixth in the final. The same month, she placed sixth in the event at the European Championships staged in Munich.

== Personal bests ==
- 800 metres – 1:57.66 (Tokyo 2021)
