= Lore Hoffmann =

Swiss middle-distance runner (born 1996)

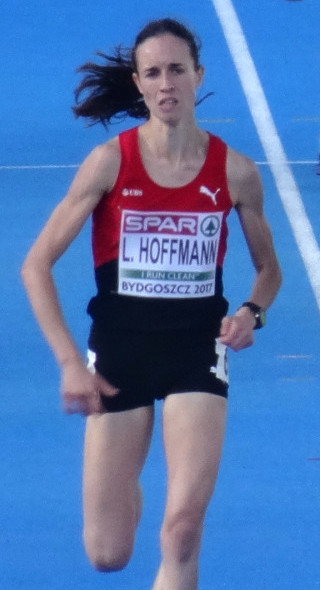
- Lore Hoffmann at the 2017 European Championships in Bydgoszcz, Poland

Personal information
- Nationality: Swiss; French
- Born: 25 July 1996 (age 29) Strasbourg, France
- Education: École Polytechnique Fédérale de Lausanne

Sport
- Country: Switzerland
- Sport: Track and field
- Event: 800 metres
- Club: ATHLE.ch
- Coached by: Marc Zimmerlin; Michel Herren

Achievements and titles
- Personal bests: 800 m: 1:58.29 (Frauenfeld, 2025); Indoors: 800 m: 1:59.91 (Metz, 2026)

Lore Hoffmann (born 25 July 1996) is a Swiss middle-distance runner who specialises in the 800 metres. She finished fourth at the 2022 European Championships and fifth at the 2021 European Indoor Championships. She reached the semi-finals of the 2020 Olympics.

== Early life and background ==
Lore Hoffmann was born on 25 July 1996 in Strasbourg, France. Her family originates from Metz, France. Growing up, she and her family moved around a lot due to her father's profession. She lived in the United States as well as Chambéry, France for four years. Then, they finally settled in Sierre, Switzerland in 2005 when she was 9. Shortly after, she began athletics at age 12 and instantly loved running.

Previously, she attended École Polytechnique Fédérale de Lausanne (EPFL) from 2015 to 2018 and earned her bachelor's degree in mechanical engineering. In 2022, she obtained a master's degree in the same field.

She is both a Swiss and French national. She became an official Swiss citizen on 31 May 2017, just in time for her first international competition at the 2023 European U23 Championships. She trained with CA Sierre in Switzerland and AS Aix-les-Bains in France.

== Achievements ==
Information from her World Athletics profile unless otherwise noted.

=== Personal bests ===
- 400 metres – 53.44 (La Chaux-de-Fonds 2021)
  - 400 metres indoor – 54.47 (Magglingen 2021)
  - 600 metres indoor – 1:31.98 (Magglingen 2020)
- 800 metres – 1:58.50 (Bellinzona 2020)
  - 800 metres indoor – 1:59.91 (Metz 2026)
- 1500 metres – 4:07.09 (Rabat 2022)

=== International competitions ===
Representing Switzerland
Year	Competition	Venue	Position	Event	Time	Notes
2017	European U23 Championships	Bydgoszcz, Poland	5th	800 m	2:05.65	
2018	European Championships	Berlin, Germany	7th (sf)	800 m	2:01.67	
2019	Universiade	Naples, Italy	4th	800 m	2:02.58	
2019	World Championships	Doha, Qatar	26th (h)	800 m	2:03.40	
2021	European Indoor Championships	Toruń, Poland	5th	800 m	2:04.84	
2021	Olympic Games	Tokyo, Japan	7th (sf)	800 m	1:59.38	
2022	World Championships	Eugene, OR, United States	8th (sf)	800 m	1:59.88	SB
2022	European Championships	Munich, Germany	4th	800 m	1:59.92	
2023	European Indoor Championships	Istanbul, Turkey	6th	800 m	2:01.22	PB
2023	European Team Championships	Chorzów, Poland	5th	1500 m	4:12.88	
2023	World Championships	Budapest, Hungary	20th (sf)	800 m	2:01.05	
2024	World Indoor Championships	Glasgow, United Kingdom	7th (sf)	800 m	2:00.06	
2024	European Championships	Rome, Italy	7th	800 m	2:01.13	
2025	European Indoor Championships	Apeldoorn, Netherlands	11th (sf)	800 m	2:03.82	
2025	World Championships	Tokyo, Japan	18th (h)	800 m	1:59.76	

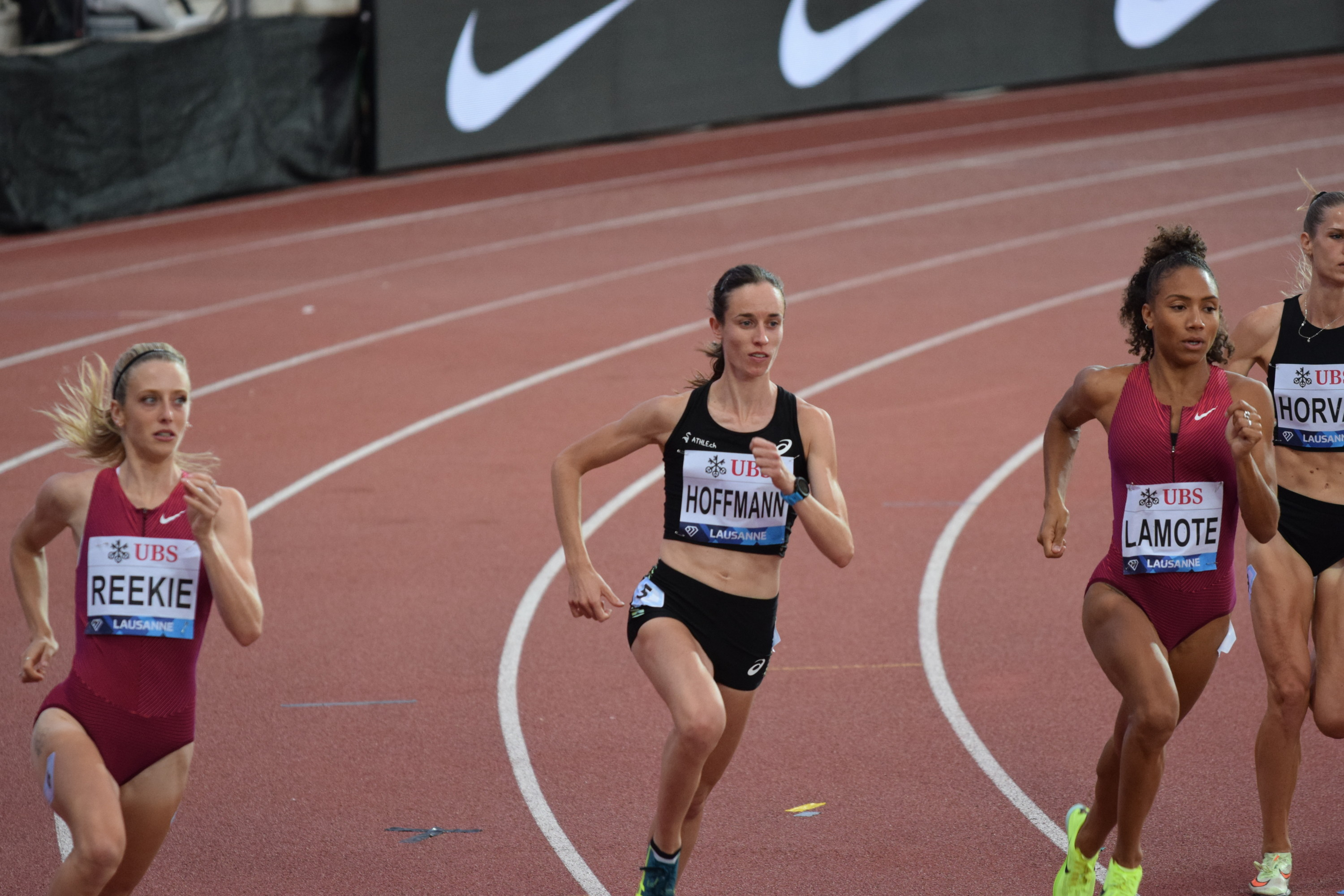
Hoffmann (centre) at 2022 Athletissima

=== National titles ===
- Swiss Athletics Championships (3)
  - 800 metres: 2017, 2020, 2021
- Swiss Indoor Athletics Championships (2)
  - 800 metres: 2016, 2021

== See also ==
- Switzerland at the Olympics
