= 2024 World Athletics Indoor Championships – Women's 800 metres =

Women's 800 metres at the 2024 World Athletics Indoor Championships
- Venue: Commonwealth Arena
- Dates: 1–3 March
- Competitors: 26 from 17 nations
- Winning time: 2:01.90

Medalists
| gold medal | Tsige Duguma | Ethiopia |
| silver medal | Jemma Reekie | Great Britain |
| bronze medal | Noélie Yarigo | Benin |

The women's 800 metres at the 2024 World Athletics Indoor Championships took place on 1, 2 and 3 March 2024.

== Results ==
=== Heats ===
Qualification: First 2 in each heat (Q) and the next 2 fastest (q) advance to the Semi-Finals. The heats were started on 1 March at 11:30.

==== Heat 1 ====
| Rank | Athlete | Nation | Time | Notes |
|---|---|---|---|---|
| 1 | Habitam Alemu | Ethiopia | 2:00.50 | Q |
| 2 | Natoya Goule-Toppin | Jamaica | 2:00.83 | Q, SB |
| 3 | Vivian Chebet Kiprotich | Kenya | 2:00.86 | q, PB |
| 4 | Angelika Sarna | Poland | 2:03.36 | |
| 5 | Bianka Kéri | Hungary | 2:03.95 | |

==== Heat 2 ====
| Rank | Athlete | Nation | Time | Notes |
|---|---|---|---|---|
| 1 | Audrey Werro | Switzerland | 2:01.83 | Q |
| 2 | Catriona Bisset | Australia | 2:02.04 | Q, SB |
| 3 | Eveliina Määttänen | Finland | 2:02.57 | |
| 4 | Naomi Korir | Kenya | 2:03.31 | |
| | Claudia Mihaela Bobocea | Romania | ~~2:04.03~~ | DSQ |

==== Heat 3 ====
| Rank | Athlete | Nation | Time | Notes |
|---|---|---|---|---|
| 1 | Jemma Reekie | Great Britain | 1:59.45 | Q |
| 2 | Eloisa Coiro | Italy | 1:59.76 | Q, PB |
| 3 | Lorea Ibarzabal | Spain | 2:00.56 | q, PB |
| 4 | Jazz Shukla | Canada | 2:03.68 | |
| 5 | Flávia Maria De Lima | Brazil | 2:05.71 | PB |

==== Heat 4 ====
| Rank | Athlete | Nation | Time | Notes |
|---|---|---|---|---|
| 1 | Tsige Duguma | Ethiopia | 2:00.50 | Q |
| 2 | Noélie Yarigo | Benin | 2:01.13 | Q |
| 3 | Anna Wielgosz | Poland | 2:01.58 | PB |
| 4 | Allie Wilson | United States | 2:01.66 | |
| 5 | Lorena Martín | Spain | 2:02.26 | |
| 6 | Jaqueline Weber | Brazil | 2:05.17 | PB |

==== Heat 5 ====
| Rank | Athlete | Nation | Time | Notes |
|---|---|---|---|---|
| 1 | Halimah Nakaayi | Uganda | 2:02.42 | Q |
| 2 | Lore Hoffmann | Switzerland | 2:02.53 | Q |
| 3 | Addison Wiley | United States | 2:02.69 | |
| 4 | Isabelle Boffey | Great Britain | 2:02.81 | |
| 5 | Madeleine Kelly | Canada | 2:06.95 | |

=== Semi-finals ===
Qualification: First 3 in each heat (Q) advance to the Final. The heats were started on 2 March at 12:10.

==== Heat 1 ====
| Rank | Athlete | Nation | Time | Notes |
|---|---|---|---|---|
| 1 | Tsige Duguma | Ethiopia | 1:58.35 | Q, PB |
| 2 | Noélie Yarigo | Benin | 1:59.45 | Q, SB |
| 3 | Vivian Chebet Kiprotich | Kenya | 1:59.65 | Q, PB |
| 4 | Lore Hoffmann | Switzerland | 2:00.06 | NR |
| 5 | Catriona Bisset | Australia | 2:00.13 | SB |
| 6 | Natoya Goule-Toppin | Jamaica | 2:01.41 | |

==== Heat 2 ====
| Rank | Athlete | Nation | Time | Notes |
|---|---|---|---|---|
| 1 | Jemma Reekie | Great Britain | 1:58.28 | Q |
| 2 | Habitam Alemu | Ethiopia | 1:58.59 | Q |
| 3 | Halimah Nakaayi | Uganda | 1:58.91 | Q, SB |
| 4 | Eloisa Coiro | Italy | 2:00.13 | |
| 5 | Audrey Werro | Switzerland | 2:00.16 | PB |
| 6 | Lorea Ibarzabal | Spain | 2:00.73 | |

=== Final ===
The final was started on 03 March at 21:20.

| Rank | Lane | Name | Nationality | Time | Notes |
|---|---|---|---|---|---|
| 1st place, gold medalist(s) | 2 | Tsige Duguma | Ethiopia | 2:01.90 | |
| 2nd place, silver medalist(s) | 6 | Jemma Reekie | Great Britain | 2:02.72 | |
| 3rd place, bronze medalist(s) | 4 | Noélie Yarigo | Benin | 2:03.15 | |
| 4 | 3 | Vivian Chebet Kiprotich | Kenya | 2:03.76 | |
| 5 | 1 | Habitam Alemu | Ethiopia | 2:03.89 | |
| 6 | 5 | Halimah Nakaayi | Uganda | 2:05.53 | |
