= Sara Lappalainen =

Finnish middle-distance runner

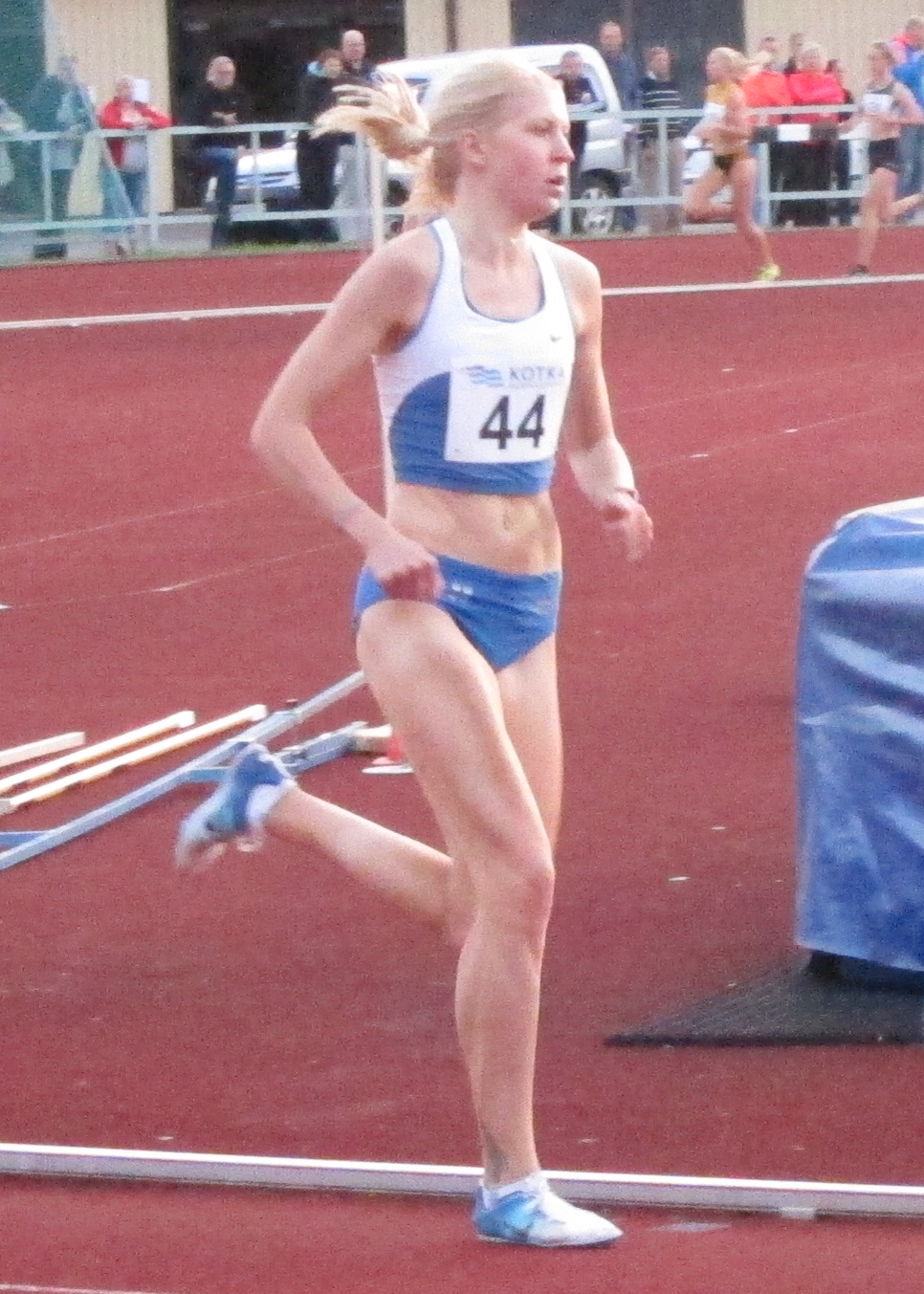
- Sara Kuivisto in 2013

Personal information
- Full name: Sara Kaisa Lappalainen
- Born: Sara Kaisa Kuivisto; 17 August 1991 (age 34) Porvoo, Finland
- Height: 1.75 m (5 ft 9 in)
- Weight: 55 kg (121 lb)

Sport
- Sport: Athletics
- Events: 800 m, 1500 m
- Club: Borgå Akilles
- Coached by: Ari Suhonen

Achievements and titles
- Olympic finals: 2020; 800 m, 9th (sf); 1500 m, 15th (SF)
- World finals: 2019; 800 m, 20th (h); 1500 m, 25th (h)
- Personal bests: 800 m: 1:59.41 NR (2021); 1000 m: 2:39.14 NR (2020); 1500 m: 4:02.35 NR (2021); Mile: 4:29.64i NR (2022)

Sara Kaisa Lappalainen (née Kuivisto, born 17 August 1991) is a Finnish middle-distance runner. Kuivisto represented Finland at the 2019 World Championships in the 800 m and 1500 m without advancing from the first round in either. She represented Finland at the 2020 Olympic Games in the 800 m and the 1500 m setting national records in both running a 1:59.41 in semi-finals of the 800 m and a 4:02.35 in the semi-finals of the 1500 m.

== International competitions ==
Year	Competition	Venue	Position	Event	Notes
Representing Finland
2018	European Championships	Berlin, Germany	17th (h)	800 m	2:02.62
2018	European Championships	Berlin, Germany	17th (h)	1500 m	4:11.39
2019	European Indoor Championships	Glasgow, United Kingdom	11th (h)	800 m	2:04.24
2019	European Indoor Championships	Glasgow, United Kingdom	16th (h)	1500 m	4:18.68
2019	World Championships	Doha, Qatar	20th (h)	800 m	2:03.15
2019	World Championships	Doha, Qatar	25th (h)	1500 m	4:08.85
2021	European Indoor Championships	Toruń, Poland	8th (sf)	800 m	2:03.64
2021	Olympic Games	Tokyo, Japan	9th (sf)	800 m	1:59.41
2021	Olympic Games	Tokyo, Japan	15th (sf)	1500 m	4:02.35
2022	World Indoor Championships	Belgrade, Serbia	11th	1500 m	4:12.79
2022	European Championships	Munich, Germany	11th (sf)	800 m	2:01.59
2024	European Championships	Rome, Italy	7th (h)	1500 m	4:07.39
2024	Olympic Games	Paris, France	35th (h)	1500 m	4:08.66

== Personal Bests ==
	Event	Time	Date	Location	Notes
Outdoor	800 m	1:59.41	31 July 2021	Tokyo, Japan	NR
Outdoor	1000 m	2:39.14	2 September 2020	Porvoo, Finland	NR
Outdoor	1500 m	4:02.35	4 August 2021	Tokyo, Japan	NR
Outdoor	3000 m	9:19.51	26 May 2018	Helsinki, Finland	
Indoor	800 m	2:02.64	13 February 2022	Uppsala, Sweden	NR
Indoor	1500 m	4:06.14	22 February 2022	Toruń, Poland	NR
Indoor	Mile	4:29.64	17 February 2022	Liévin, France	NR
Indoor	3000 m	9:30.06	27 January 2019	Helsinki, Finland	
