= Tigist Girma (runner, born 2002) =

Ethiopian athlete

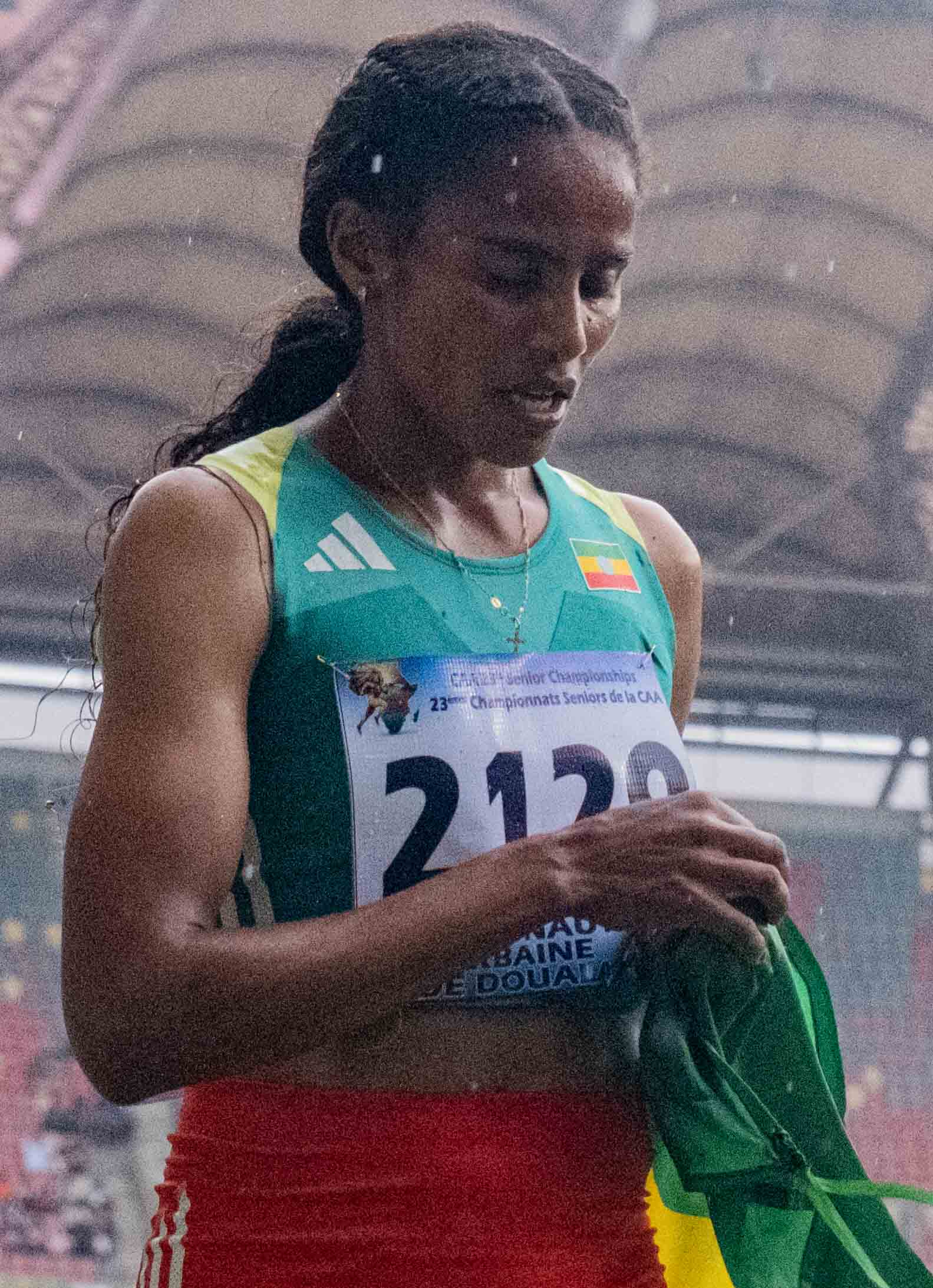

Personal information
- Nationality: Ethiopia
- Born: 7 November 2002 (age 23)

Sport
- Sport: Athletics
- Event(s): 800m, 1500m

Achievements and titles
- Personal best(s): 800m: 1:59.72 (Heusden-Zolder, 2023); 1500m: 3:58.79 (Toruń, 2024)

Tigist Girma (born 7 November 2002) is an Ethiopian athlete who competes as a middle distance runner.

== Career ==
In February 2022, she finished second in the 800m indoors in Val-de-Reuil in a time of 2:01.68. The following month, she made her international debut when she participated in the 2022 World Athletics Indoor Championships in Belgrade, missing out on a place in the 800m final by just 0.002 seconds.

In June 2023, she set a new personal best in the 1500m of 3:59.33 competing in Ostrava. The following month she set a new personal best in the 800 metres, running 1:59.72 in Heusden-Zolder. Later that year she participated in the World Championships in Budapest in the 800 metres, and ran a time of 2:01.47. She also competed at the Diamond League event in Xiamen over 1500 metres.

At the 2024 Copernicus Cup in February 2024, she set a new 1500m personal best, running 3:58.79.

She finished eighth in the 1500 metres in May 2025 at the 2025 Doha Diamond League.
