= Renée Eykens =

Belgian middle-distance runner

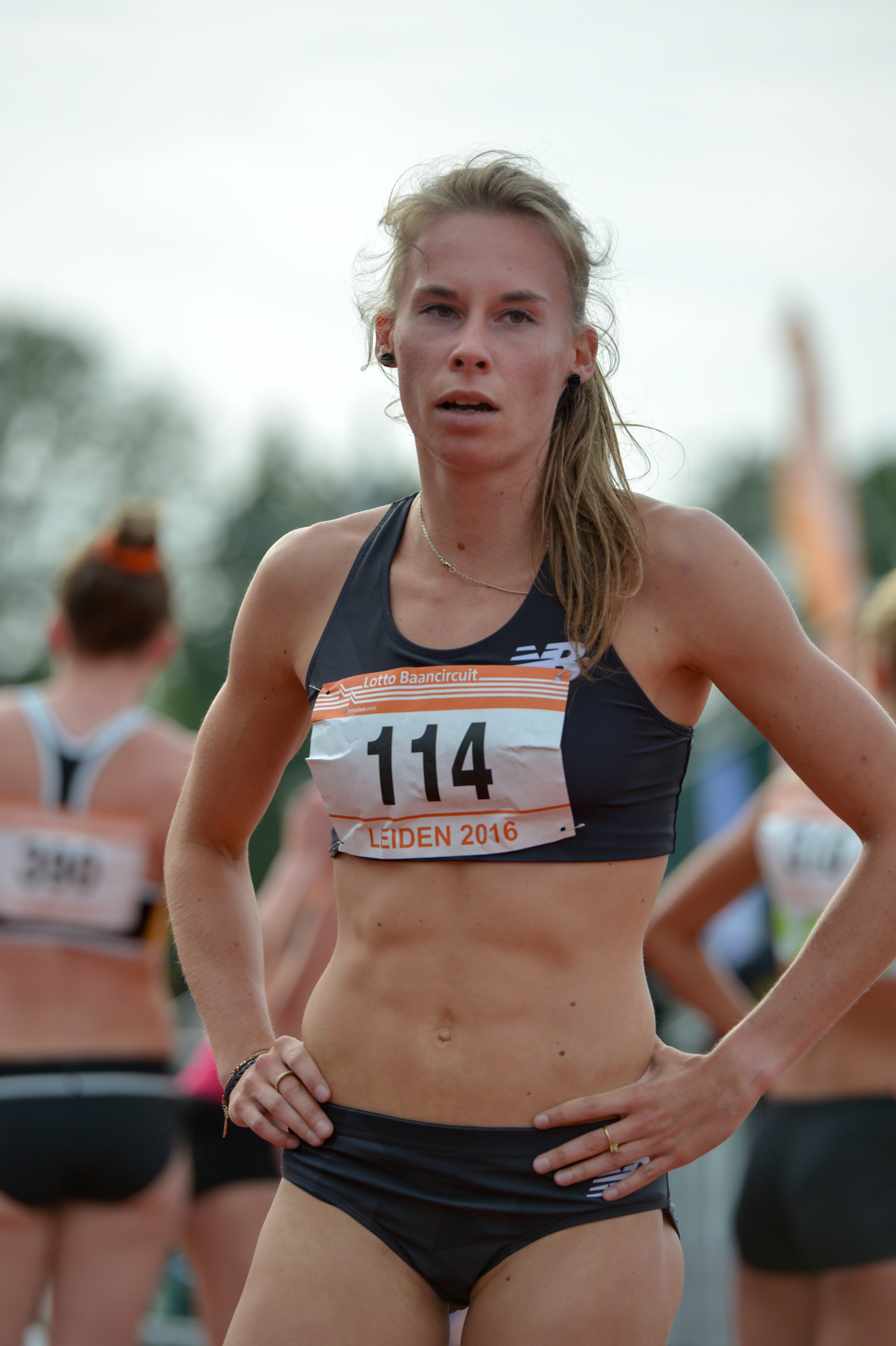
- Renée Eykens in 2016

Personal information
- Born: 8 June 1996 (age 30) Brasschaat, Belgium
- Height: 1.70 m (5 ft 7 in)
- Weight: 54 kg (119 lb)

Sport
- Country: Belgium
- Sport: Track and field
- Event: 800 metres
- Coached by: Paul Sauviller
Medal record
European Junior Championships
Gold medal – first place	2015 Eskilstuna	800 metres
European U23 Championships
Gold medal – first place	2017 Bydgoszcz	800 metres

Renée Eykens (born 8 June 1996) is a Belgian middle-distance runner. She competed in the 800 metres at the 2016 Summer Olympics reaching the semifinals. In addition, she is the 2015 European Junior gold medallist.

== International competitions ==
Year	Competition	Venue	Position	Event	Notes
Representing Belgium
2013	World Youth Championships	Donetsk, Ukraine	6th	800 m	2:07.70
2015	European Junior Championships	Eskilstuna, Sweden	1st	800 m	2:02.83
2016	European Championship	Amsterdam, Netherlands	14th (sf)	800 m	2:02.38
2016	Olympic Games	Rio de Janeiro, Brazil	16th (sf)	800 m	2:00.45
2017	European U23 Championships	Bydgoszcz, Poland	1st	800 m	2:04.73
2018	European Championships	Berlin, Germany	32nd (h)	800 m	2:56.24
2019	European Indoor Championships	Glasgow, United Kingdom	4th	800 m	2:03.32
2019	Universiade	Naples, Italy	6th	800 m	2:02.71
2019	World Championships	Doha, Qatar	32nd (h)	800 m	2:03.65

== Personal bests ==
Outdoor

- 800 metres – 2:00.00 (Rio de Janeiro 2016)
- 1000 metres – 2:39.15 (Brussels 2020)
- 1500 metres – 4:10.12 (Leuven 2016)

Indoor

- 800 metres – 2:02.15 (Birmingham 2019)
