= Aníta Hinriksdóttir =

Icelandic middle-distance runner

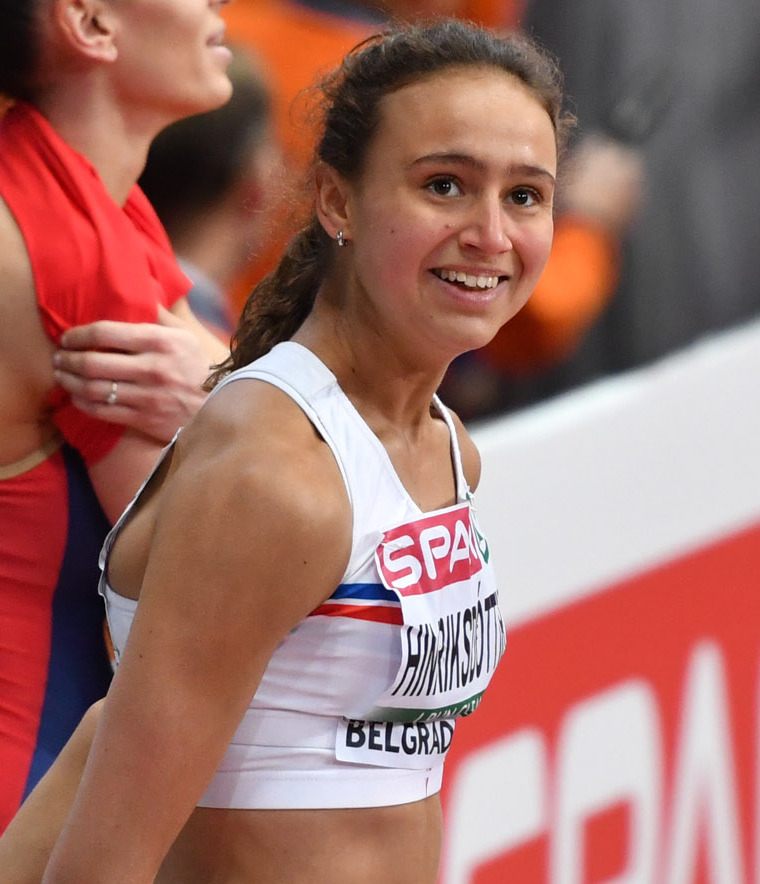
- Aníta at the 2017 European Indoor Championships in Belgrade

Personal information
- Born: 13 January 1996 (age 30) Reykjavík, Iceland
- Height: 1.61 m (5 ft 3 in)
- Weight: 50 kg (110 lb)

Sport
- Country: Iceland
- Sport: Athletics
- Events: 400 metres, 800 m, 1500 m
- Club: Fimleikafélag Hafnarfjarðar
- Coached by: Gunnar Páll Jóakimsson
Medal record
Women's athletics
Representing Iceland
European Indoor Championships
Bronze medal – third place	2017 Belgrade	800 m
European U23 Championships
Silver medal – second place	2017 Bydgoszcz	800 m
European U20 Championships
Gold medal – first place	2013 Rieti	800 m
World U18 Championships
Gold medal – first place	2013 Donetsk	800 m

Aníta Hinriksdóttir (born 13 January 1996) is an Icelandic middle-distance track athlete who specializes in the 800 metres. She won the bronze medal in the event at the 2017 European Indoor Championships and a silver at the 2017 European Under-23 Championships.

As a 16-year old, she placed fourth in the 800 m at the 2012 World U20 Championships before winning the event at the 2013 World U18 Championships and European U20 Championships. Aníta is the Icelandic record holder for the 800 m and 1500 m outdoors and indoors and holds also five other individual national records. She won 13 Icelandic titles.

== Biography ==
Aníta was born in Reykjavík, Iceland. On 14 July 2013, she won the 800 m at the 2013 World Youth Championships in Athletics in Donetsk, Ukraine. On 20 July, she won the event at the 2013 European Junior Championships in Athletics held in Rieti, Italy. These achievements made her the first person to win gold medals at both the World Youth Championships and the European Junior Championships in athletics.

She then represented Iceland at the 2016 Rio Olympics in the women's 800 m event. Aníta set another Icelandic national record with a time of 2:00.14 but just failed to qualify to the semifinals.

== Personal life ==
Aníta is the niece of long-distance runner Martha Ernstsdóttir, who competed in the women's marathon at the 2000 Summer Olympics.

== Statistics ==
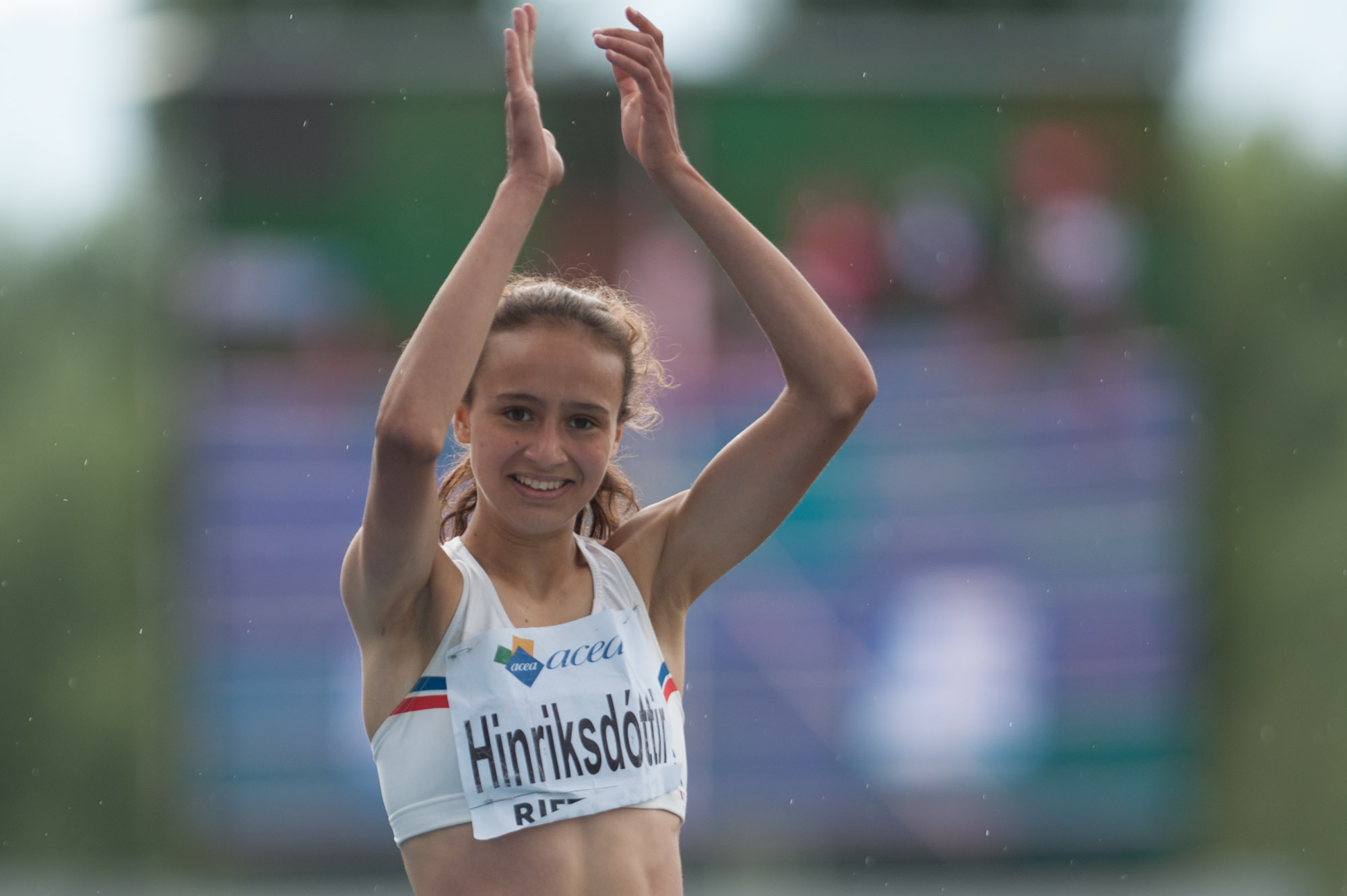
At 17, Aníta Hinriksdóttir won gold in the 800 m at the 2013 European Under-20 Championships in Rieti (IT).

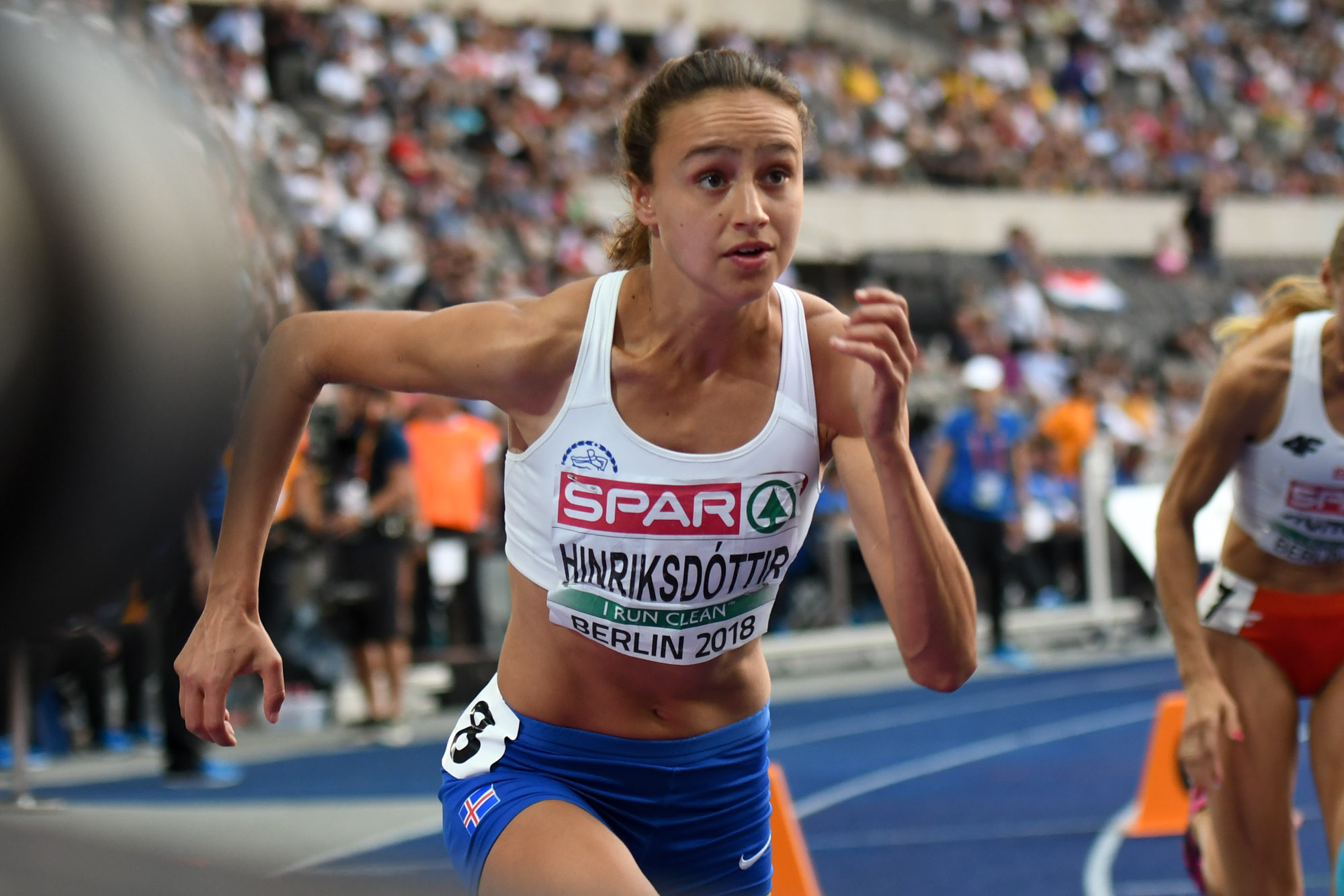
Hinriksdóttir was disqualified at the 2018 European Athletics Championships held in Berlin.

=== International competitions ===
Representing Iceland
Year	Competition	Venue	Position	Event	Time
2011	Nordic Junior Championships	Copenhagen, Denmark	1st	800 m	2:08.64
2011	Nordic Junior Championships	Copenhagen, Denmark	3rd	1500 m	4:28.59
2011	Nordic Junior Championships	Copenhagen, Denmark	4th	4 × 400 m relay	3:48.03
2012	World Junior Championships	Barcelona, Spain	4th	800 m	2:03.23
2012	Nordic Junior Championships	Växjö, Sweden	1st	800 m	2:03.66
2012	Nordic Junior Championships	Växjö, Sweden	2nd	2000 m s'chase	6:34.80
2013	European Indoor Championships	Gothenburg, Sweden	11th (sf)	800 m	2:04.72
2013	Games of the Small States of Europe	Luxembourg, Luxembourg	1st	400 m	54.29
2013	Games of the Small States of Europe	Luxembourg, Luxembourg	1st	800 m	2:04.60
2013	Games of the Small States of Europe	Luxembourg, Luxembourg	1st	4 × 400 m relay	3:40.97
2013	European Team Championships Third League	Banská Bystrica, Slovakia	1st	800 m	2:01.17
2013	European Team Championships Third League	Banská Bystrica, Slovakia	1st	1500 m	4:16.51
2013	European Team Championships Third League	Banská Bystrica, Slovakia	2nd	4 × 400 m relay	3:39.14
2013	World Youth Championships	Donetsk, Ukraine	1st	800 m	2:01.13 CR
2013	European Junior Championships	Rieti, Italy	1st	800 m	2:01.14
2013	Nordic Junior Championships	Espoo, Finland	1st	800 m	2:03.94
2013	Nordic Junior Championships	Espoo, Finland	1st	1500 m	4:18.18
2013	Nordic Junior Championships	Espoo, Finland	2nd	4 × 400 m relay	3:46.28
2014	World Indoor Championships	Sopot, Poland	– (h)	800 m	DQ
2014	European Team Championships Third League	Tbilisi, Georgia	1st	800 m	2:02.70
2014	European Team Championships Third League	Tbilisi, Georgia	2nd	1500 m	4:18.49
2014	World Junior Championships	Eugene, OR, United States	– (f)	800 m	DNF
2014	European Championships	Zürich, Switzerland	11th (sf)	800 m	2:02.45
2015	European Indoor Championships	Prague, Czech Republic	5th	800 m	2:02.74
2015	Games of the Small States of Europe	Reykjavík, Iceland	2nd	800 m	2:09.10
2015	Games of the Small States of Europe	Reykjavík, Iceland	1st	1500 m	4:26.37
2015	European Team Championships Second League	Stara Zagora, Bulgaria	2nd	800 m	2:03.17
2015	European Junior Championships	Eskilstuna, Sweden	3rd	800 m	2:05.04
2015	World Championships	Beijing, China	20th (h)	800 m	2:01.01
2016	World Indoor Championships	Portland, OR, United States	5th	800 m	2:02.58
2016	European Championships	Amsterdam, Netherlands	8th	800 m	2:02.55
2016	Olympic Games	Rio de Janeiro, Brazil	20th (h)	800 m	2:00.14
2017	European Indoor Championships	Belgrade, Serbia	3rd	800 m	2:01.25
2017	European Team Championships Second League	Tel Aviv, Israel	1st	800 m	2:02.57
2017	European Team Championships Second League	Tel Aviv, Israel	4th	4 × 400 m relay	3:40.80
2017	European U23 Championships	Bydgoszcz, Poland	2nd	800 m	2:05.02
2017	World Championships	London, United Kingdom	37th (h)	800 m	2:03.45
2018	World Indoor Championships	Birmingham, United Kingdom	23rd (h)	1500 m	4:15.73
2018	European Championships	Berlin, Germany	– (sf)	800 m	DQ
2019	Games of the Small States of Europe	Bar, Montenegro	2nd	1500 m	4:22.34
2019	European Team Championships Third League	Skopje, North Macedonia	2nd	800 m	2:06.16 SB
2019	European Team Championships Third League	Skopje, North Macedonia	2nd	1500 m	4:36.33
2026	World Indoor Championships	Toruń, Poland	22nd (h)	1500 m	4:23.17

=== Personal bests ===
Outdoor
Event	Time	Venue	Date	Notes
400 metres	54.29	Luxembourg, Luxembourg	29 May 2013	NU18R NU20R
800 metres	2:00.05	Oslo, Norway	15 June 2017	NR
1000 metres	2:36.63	Hengelo, Netherlands	24 May 2015	NR
1500 metres	4:06.43	Hengelo, Netherlands	11 June 2017	NR
Mile	4:29.20	Hengelo, Netherlands	3 June 2018	NR
2000 m steeplechase	6:31.74	Trier, Germany	6 September 2024	NR

Indoor
Event	Time	Venue	Date	Notes
400 metres	54.21	Reykjavík, Iceland	6 February 2016	
600 metres	1:27.65	Reykjavík, Iceland	19 December 2014	NR
800 metres	2:01.18	Reykjavík, Iceland	4 February 2017	NR
1000 metres	2:43.22	Reykjavík, Iceland	15 December 2012	NR
1500 metres	4:09.54	Düsseldorf, Germany	6 February 2018	NR
4 × 200 m relay	1:38.54	Hafnarfjörður, Iceland	28 February 2015	
4 × 400 m relay	3:49.12	Reykjavík, Iceland	10 February 2013	NR

Awards and achievements
Preceded by (Sweden) Angelica Bengtsson	Women's European Athletics Rising Star of the Year; 2013	Succeeded by (Russia) Mariya Kuchina
