= Eleonora Vandi =

Italian middle-distance runner

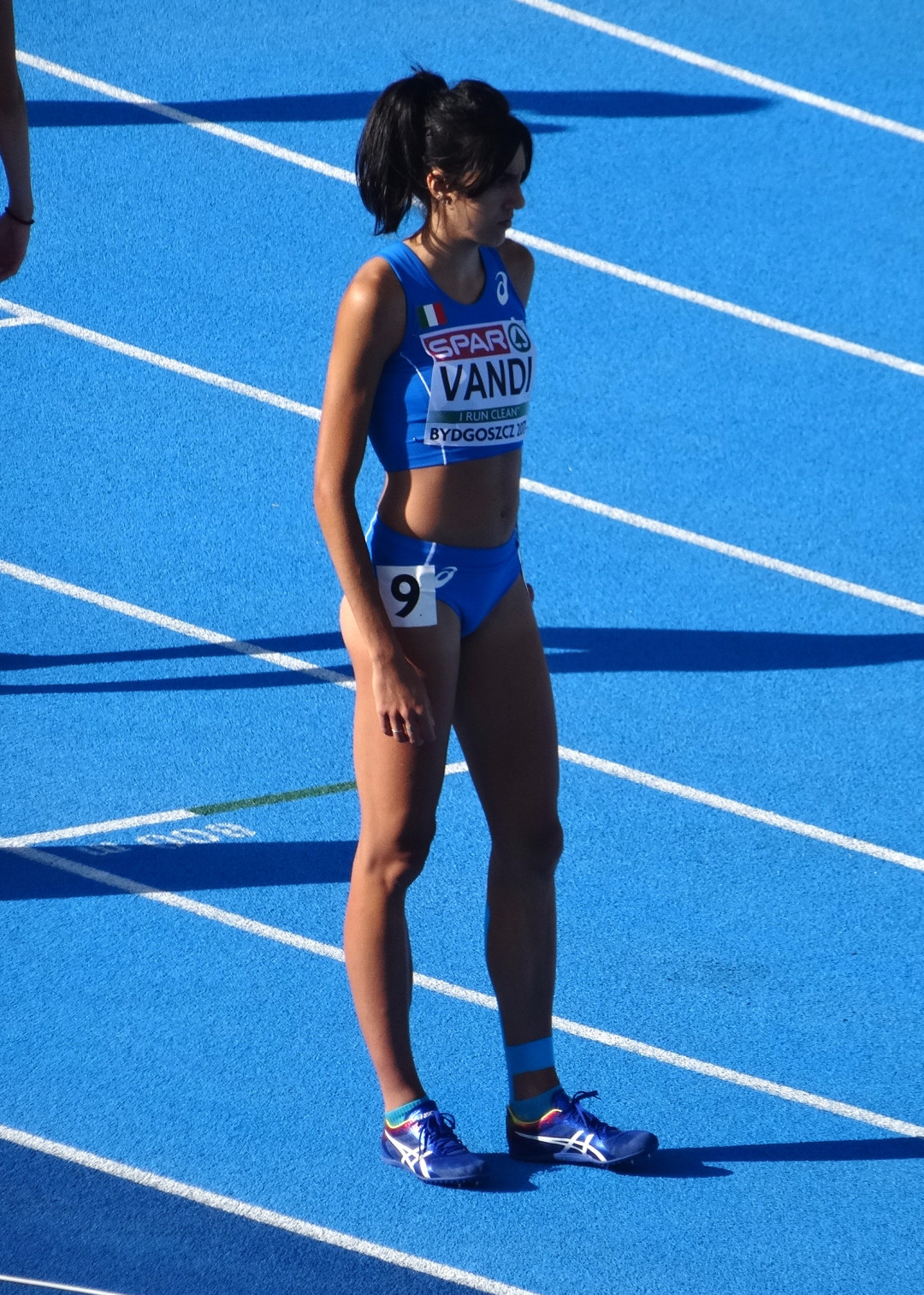
- Eleonora Vandi in 2017

Personal information
- Born: 15 March 1996 (age 30) Pesaro, Italy
- Education: Ca' Foscari University of Venice
- Height: 1.81 m (5 ft 11 in)
- Weight: 58 kg (128 lb)

Sport
- Sport: Athletics
- Event: 800 metres
- Club: Atletica Avis Macerata
- Coached by: Faouzi Lahbi

Eleonora Vandi (born 15 March 1996) is an Italian middle-distance runner competing primarily in the 800 metres.

Eleonora is the older sister of the sprinter Elisabetta Vandi.

== Biography ==
She represented her country at the 2019 World Championships without advancing from the first round. Both her parents were athletes, father Luca a middle-distance runner, mother Valeria Fontan a sprinter.

== Achievements ==
Year	Competition	Venue	Position	Event	Notes
Representing Italy
2013	World Youth Championships	Donetsk, Ukraine	26th (h)	800 m	2:15.11
2015	European Junior Championships	Eskilstuna, Sweden	10th (h)	800 m	2:08.25
2016	Mediterranean U23 Championships	Tunis, Tunisia	1st	800 m	2:07.51
2017	European U23 Championships	Bydgoszcz, Poland	15th (h)	800 m	2:07.69
2019	Universiade	Naples, Italy	13th (sf)	800 m	2:05.09
2019	World Championships	Doha, Qatar	38th (h)	800 m	2:04.98
2021	European Indoor Championships	Toruń, Poland	14th (sf)	800 m	2:04.97

== National titles ==
- Italian Athletics Championships
  - 1500 m: 2020

== Personal bests ==
Outdoor

- 800 metres – 2:00.88 (Rehlingen 2019)
- 1500 metres – 4:18.07 (Pescara 2018)
- 3000 metres – 9:36.81 (Trento 2018)

Indoor

- 800 metres – 2:05.62 (Ancona 2019)
- 1500 metres – 4:21.74 (Padua 2019)
- 3000 metres – 9:50.31 (Padua 2019)
