= Nadia Power =

Irish middle-distance runner

Personal information
- Nationality: Irish
- Born: 11 January 1998 (age 27)

Sport
- Sport: Athletics
- Event: 800 metres

Nadia Power (born 11 January 1998) is an Irish athlete. She competed in the women's 800 metres event at the 2021 European Athletics Indoor Championships. She was named as the Irish Times/Sport Ireland Sportswoman for January 2021.
