= Madeleine Kelly =

Canadian track and field athlete

Personal information
- Born: December 28, 1995 (age 30) Pembroke, Ontario, Canada
- Height: 177 cm (5 ft 10 in)
- Weight: 60 kg (132 lb)

Sport
- Country: Canada
- Sport: Track and field

Achievements and titles
- Personal best: 800 meters: 1:59.71 (2022)

Madeleine Kelly (born December 28, 1995) is a Canadian track and field athlete specializing in the middle-distance events.

== Career ==
In July 2021, Kelly was named to Canada's 2020 Olympic team in the women's 800 metres. She placed fifth in her heat and did not advance to the semi-finals.

She competed for Canada at the 2024 World Athletics Indoor Championships – Women's 800 metres in Glasgow.
