= Elena Bellò =

Italian middle-distance runner (born 1997)

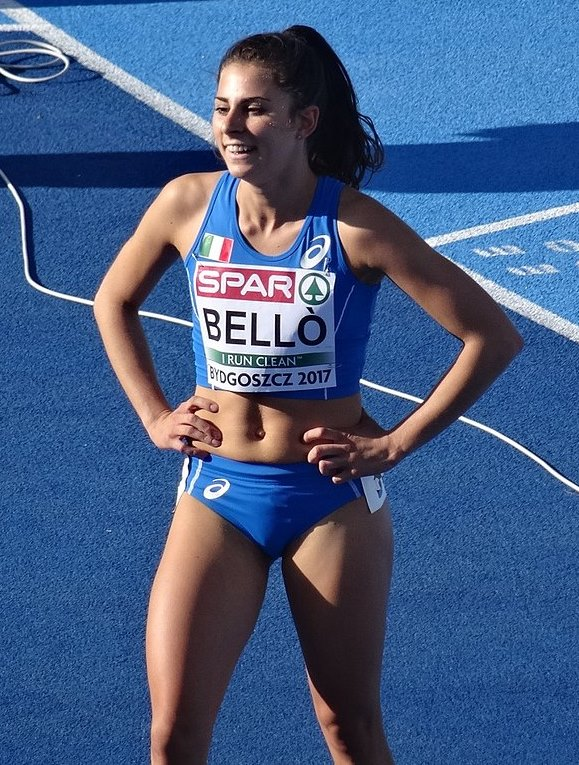
- Bellò in 2017.

Personal information
- National team: Italy: 5 caps (2019-2021)
- Born: 18 January 1997 (age 29) Schio, Italy
- Height: 1.64 m (5 ft 5 in)
- Weight: 50 kg (110 lb)

Sport
- Sport: Athletics
- Event: Middle-distance running
- Club: G.S. Fiamme Azzurre
- Coached by: Massimo Pegoretti (2014-2019); Alessabdro Simonelli (2020- )

Achievements and titles
- Personal bests: 800 m: 1:58.89 (2024); 1500 m: 4:05.09 (2022)
Medal record
European Team Championships
Silver medal – second place	2021 Silesia	800 m
Mediterranean U23 Championships
Gold medal – first place	2018 Jesolo	800 m

Elena Bellò (born 18 January 1997) is an Italian middle-distance runner specialized in the 800 m, her best result at the international senior level was second place at the 2021 European Team Championships in Silesia. She won five national titles at senior level. She competed at the 2020 Summer Olympics, in 800 m.

== Career ==
At international youth level she won gold medal at the 2018 Mediterranean Athletics U23 Championships. She was 7th, before those excluded from the final, at the 2021 European Athletics Championships.

== Achievements ==
Year	Competition	Venue	Rank	Event	Time	Notes
2017	European U23 Championships	(Poland) Bydgoszcz	6th	800 m	2:05.96	
2018	Mediterranean U23 Championships	(Italy) Jesolo	1st	800 m	2:04.31	CR
2018	European Championships	(Germany) Berlin	Heat	800 m	2:02.77	
2019	European U23 Championships	(Sweden) Gävle	6th	800 m	2:07.59	
2021	European Indoor Championships	(Poland) Toruń	7th (SF)	800 m	2:03.61	
2021	European Team Championships (SL)	(Poland) Chorzów	2nd	800 m	2:02.06	SB

== National titles ==
Bellò won six national championships at individual senior level.

- Italian Athletics Championships
  - 800 m: 2020, 2021 (2)
- Italian Athletics Indoor Championships
  - 800 m: 2018, 2019, 2020, 2021 (4)

== See also ==
- Italian all-time top lists - 800 m
