= Síofra Cléirigh Büttner =

Irish middle-distance runner

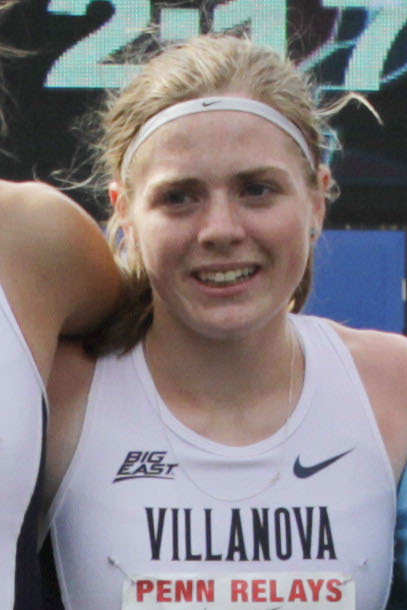
- Cléirigh Büttner in 2017

Personal information
- Nationality: Irish
- Born: 21 July 1995 (age 31) Dublin, Ireland
- Height: 1.66 m (5 ft 5 in)

Sport
- Country: Ireland
- Sport: Middle-distance running
- Events: 400 metres 800 metres 1500 metres Distance medley relay 4 × 400 metres relay 4 × 800 metres relay 4 × 1500 metres relay
- College team: Villanova University
- Club: Dundrum South Dublin Athletic Club

Achievements and titles
- Personal bests: 400m: 55.57; 800m: 2:01.67; 1500m: 4:10.43
Medal record
Representing Ireland
European Youth Olympic Festival
Silver medal – second place	2011 Trabzon	1500m

Síofra Cléirigh Büttner (Irish: [ˈʃiːfˠɾˠə ˈclʲeːɾʲiː], German: [ˈbʏtnɐ]; born 21 July 1995) is an Irish middle-distance runner.

== Early life ==
Cléirigh Büttner grew up in Dublin and attended Coláiste Íosagáin, Booterstown. Her parents are Merv Büttner and Fiona Ní Chléirigh. She won a silver medal in the girls' 1500m at the 2011 European Youth Olympics.

== Career ==
Cléirigh Büttner attends Villanova University, Pennsylvania, and won a rare "triple" at the Penn Relays: Distance medley relay, 4 × 800 metres, and 4 × 1500 metres. She ran the 800 metres at the 2017 World Championships in Athletics.
