= 2017 European Athletics Indoor Championships – Women's 800 metres =

The women's 800 metres event at the 2017 European Athletics Indoor Championships will be held on 3 March 2017 at 10:58 (heats), on 4 March at 19:03 (semifinals) and on 5 March 17:25 (final) local time.

== Medalists ==
Gold	Silver	Bronze
Selina Büchel; Switzerland	Shelayna Oskan-Clarke; Great Britain	Aníta Hinriksdóttir; Iceland

== Records ==
Standing records prior to the 2017 European Athletics Indoor Championships
World record	Jolanda Čeplak (SLO)	1:55.82	Vienna, Austria	3 March 2002
European record	Jolanda Čeplak (SLO)	1:55.82	Vienna, Austria	3 March 2002
Championship record	Jolanda Čeplak (SLO)	1:55.82	Vienna, Austria	3 March 2002
World Leading	Ajeé Wilson (USA)	1:58.27	New York City, United States	11 February 2017
European Leading	Joanna Jóźwik (POL)	1:59.29	Toruń, Poland	10 February 2017

== Results ==
=== Heats ===
Qualification: First 2 in each heat (Q) and the next 4 fastest (q) advance to the Semifinal.

Rank	Heat	Athlete	Nationality	Time	Note
1	2	Aníta Hinriksdóttir	Iceland	2:02.82	Q
2	4	Selina Büchel	Switzerland	2:03.11	Q
3	4	Esther Guerrero	Spain	2:03.38	Q
4	2	Lovisa Lindh	Sweden	2:03.47	Q
5	4	Sanne Verstegen	Netherlands	2:03.55	q
6	2	Alexandra Štuková	Slovakia	2:04.46	q, PB
7	2	Anastasiya Tkachuk	Ukraine	2:04.62	q
8	3	Clarisse Moh	France	2:04.74	Q
9	3	Stina Troest	Denmark	2:04.78	Q
10	4	Charline Mathias	Luxembourg	2:04.82	q
11	3	Hedda Hynne	Norway	2:04.88	
12	3	Anna Silvander	Sweden	2:05.63	
13	2	Lenka Masná	Czech Republic	2:05.64	
14	4	Yngvild Elvemo	Norway	2:05.79	
15	1	Shelayna Oskan-Clarke	Great Britain	2:06.02	Q
16	1	Līga Velvere	Latvia	2:06.03	Q
17	1	Olha Lyakhova	Ukraine	2:06.33	
18	1	Kateřina Hálová	Czech Republic	2:06.85	
19	1	Bianka Kéri	Hungary	2:07.71	

=== Semifinals ===
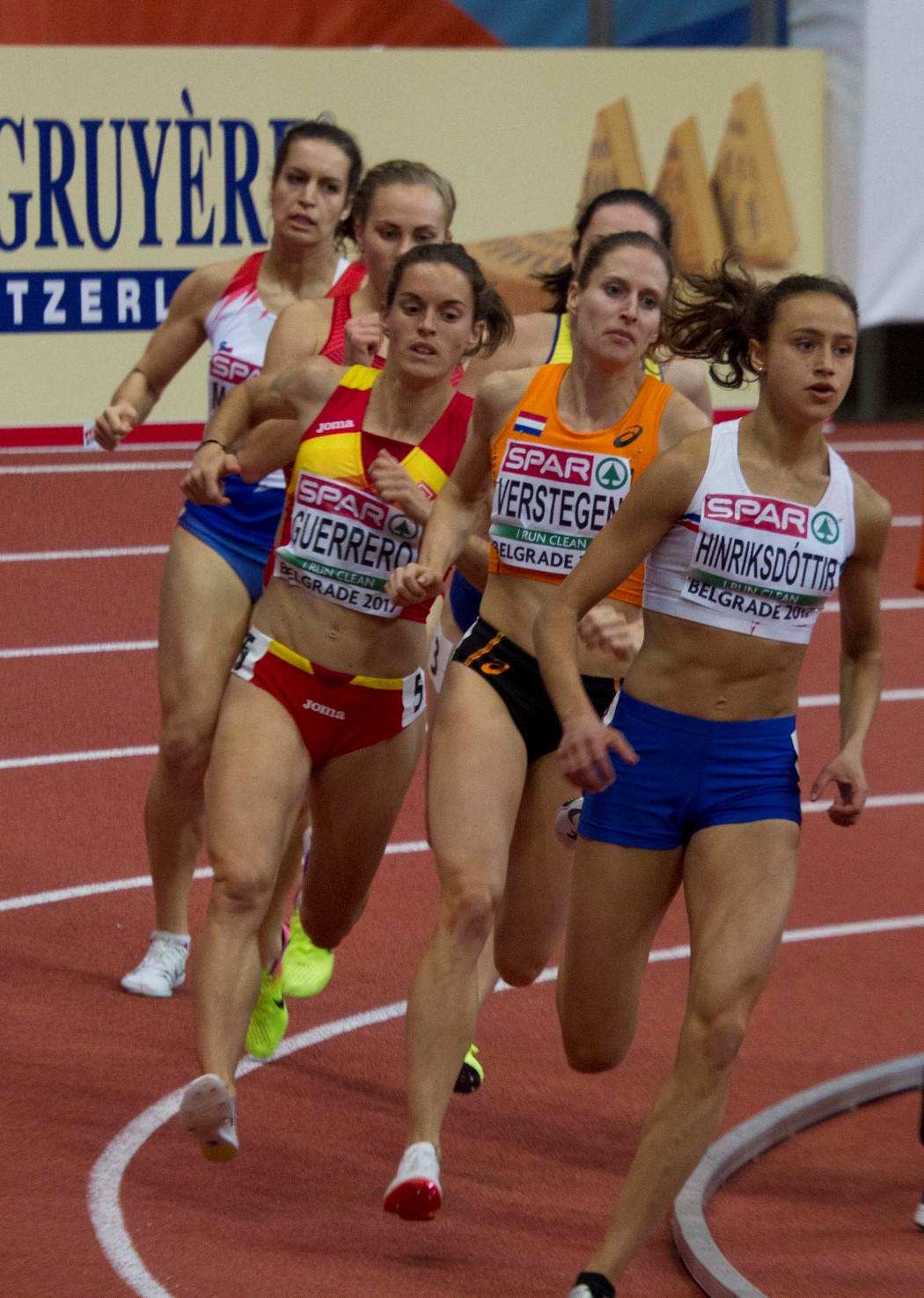
Semifinal 1

Qualification: First 3 in each heat (Q) advance to the Final.

Rank	Heat	Athlete	Nationality	Time	Note
1	1	Esther Guerrero	Spain	2:02.91	Q
2	1	Aníta Hinriksdóttir	Iceland	2:02.97	Q
3	1	Stina Troest	Denmark	2:02.98	Q
4	1	Sanne Verstegen	Netherlands	2:03.06	
5	2	Shelayna Oskan-Clarke	Great Britain	2:03.09	Q
6	2	Selina Büchel	Switzerland	2:03.23	Q
7	2	Lovisa Lindh	Sweden	2:03.26	Q
8	2	Clarisse Moh	France	2:04.85	
9	1	Anastasiya Tkachuk	Ukraine	2:05.78	
10	1	Charline Mathias	Luxembourg	2:05.93	
11	2	Alexandra Štuková	Slovakia	2:07.47	
	2	Līga Velvere	Latvia	DQ	R163.3b

=== Final ===
Rank	Athlete	Nationality	Time	Note
1st place, gold medalist(s)	Selina Büchel	Switzerland	2:00.38	NR
2nd place, silver medalist(s)	Shelayna Oskan-Clarke	Great Britain	2:00.39	PB
3rd place, bronze medalist(s)	Aníta Hinriksdóttir	Iceland	2:01.25	
4	Lovisa Lindh	Sweden	2:01.37	PB
5	Stina Troest	Denmark	2:02.93	
6	Esther Guerrero	Spain	2:03.09	
