= 2019 European Athletics Indoor Championships – Women's 800 metres =

Women's athletic competition

The women's 800 metres event at the 2019 European Athletics Indoor Championships was held on 1 March 2019 at 11:10 (heats), on 2 March at 18:06 (semifinals) and on 3 March 2019 at 19:18 (final) local time.

== Medalists ==
Gold	Silver	Bronze
Shelayna Oskan-Clarke; Great Britain	Rénelle Lamote; France	Olha Lyakhova; Ukraine

== Records ==
Standing records prior to the 2017 European Athletics Indoor Championships
World record	Jolanda Čeplak (SLO)	1:55.82	Vienna, Austria	3 March 2002
European record	Jolanda Čeplak (SLO)	1:55.82	Vienna, Austria	3 March 2002
Championship record	Jolanda Čeplak (SLO)	1:55.82	Vienna, Austria	3 March 2002
World Leading	Ajeé Wilson (USA)	1:58.60	New York City, United States	9 February 2019
European Leading	Aleksandra Gulyayeva (RUS)	1:59.37	Moscow, Russia	3 February 2019

== Results ==
=== Heats ===
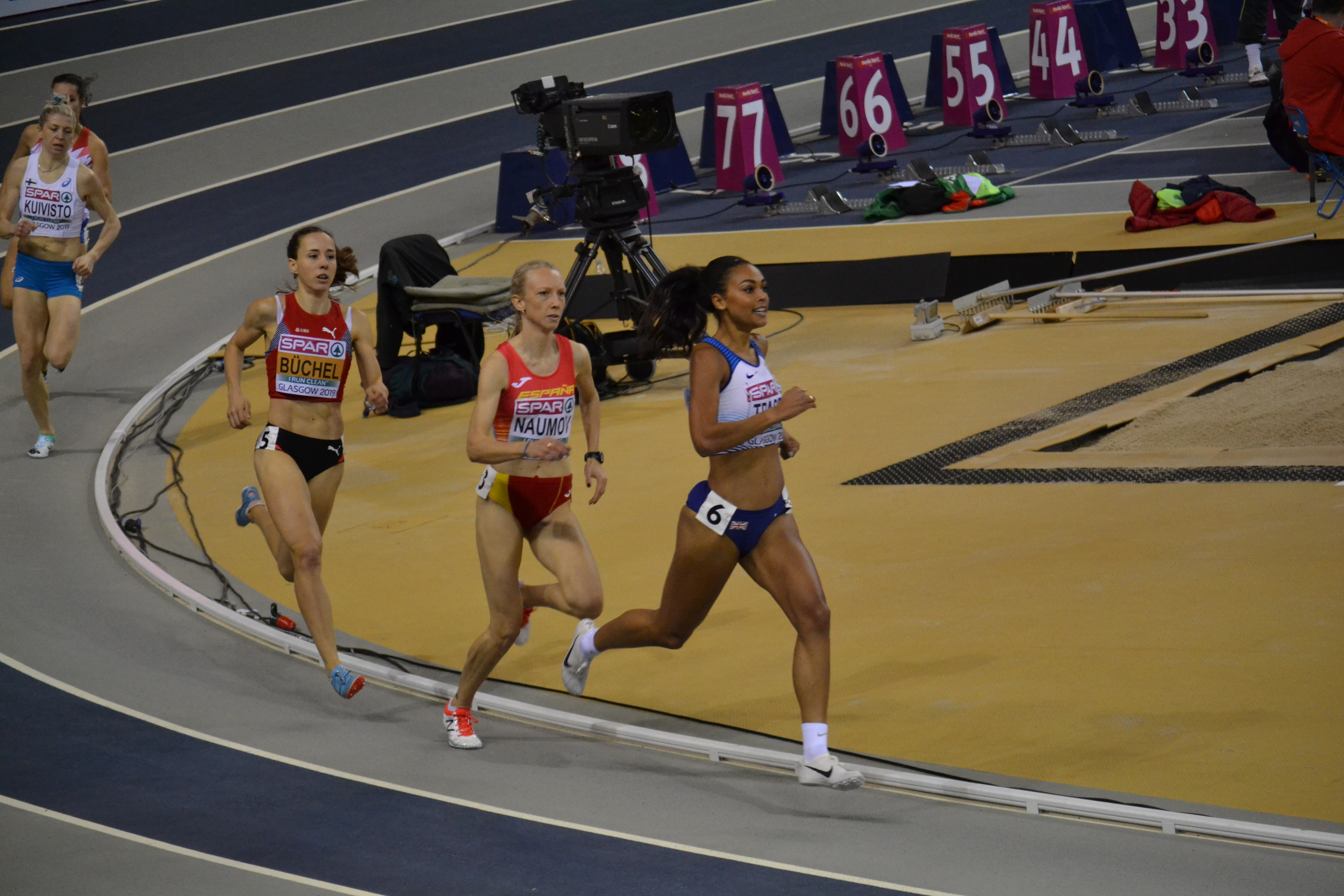
Heat 1

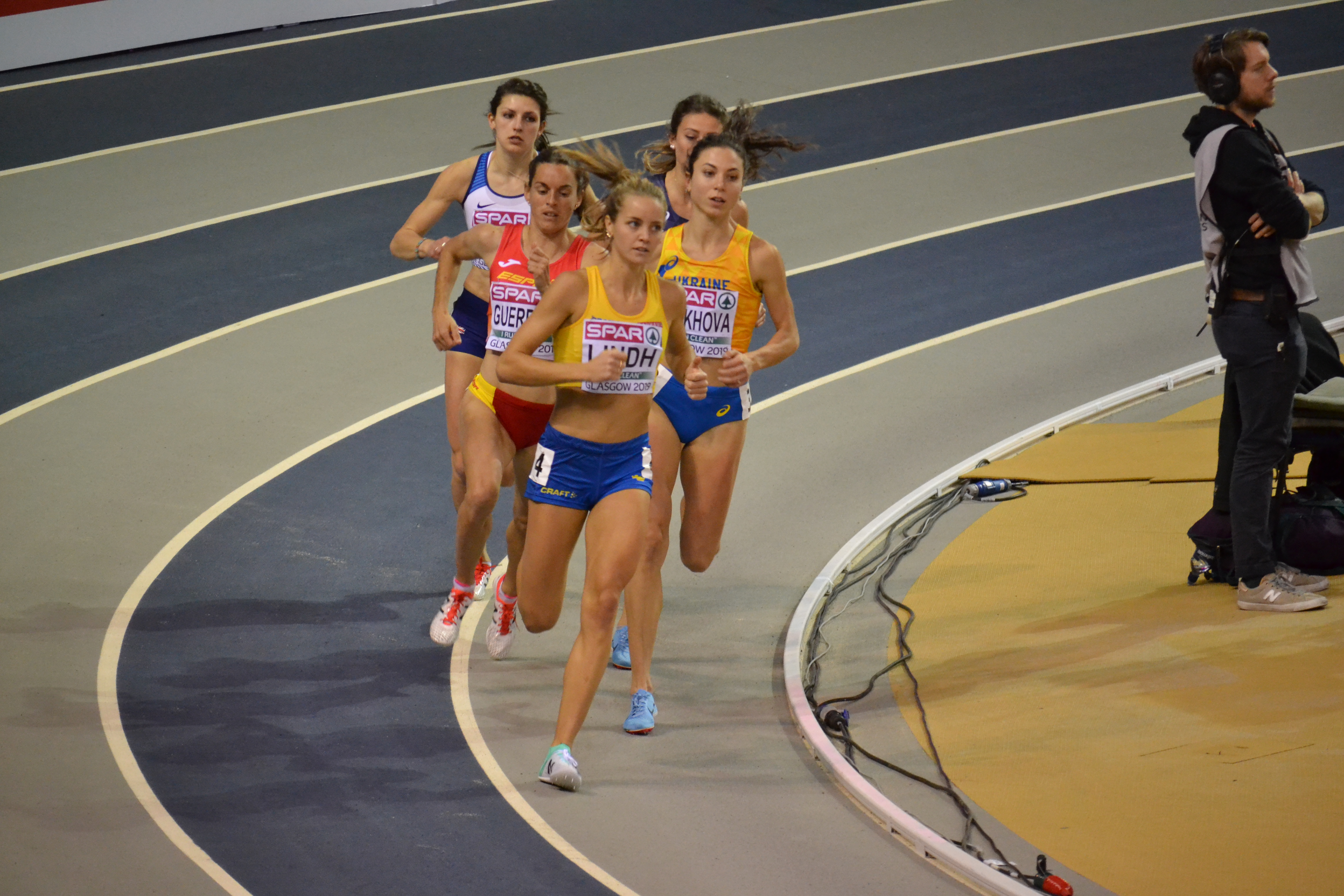
Heat 2

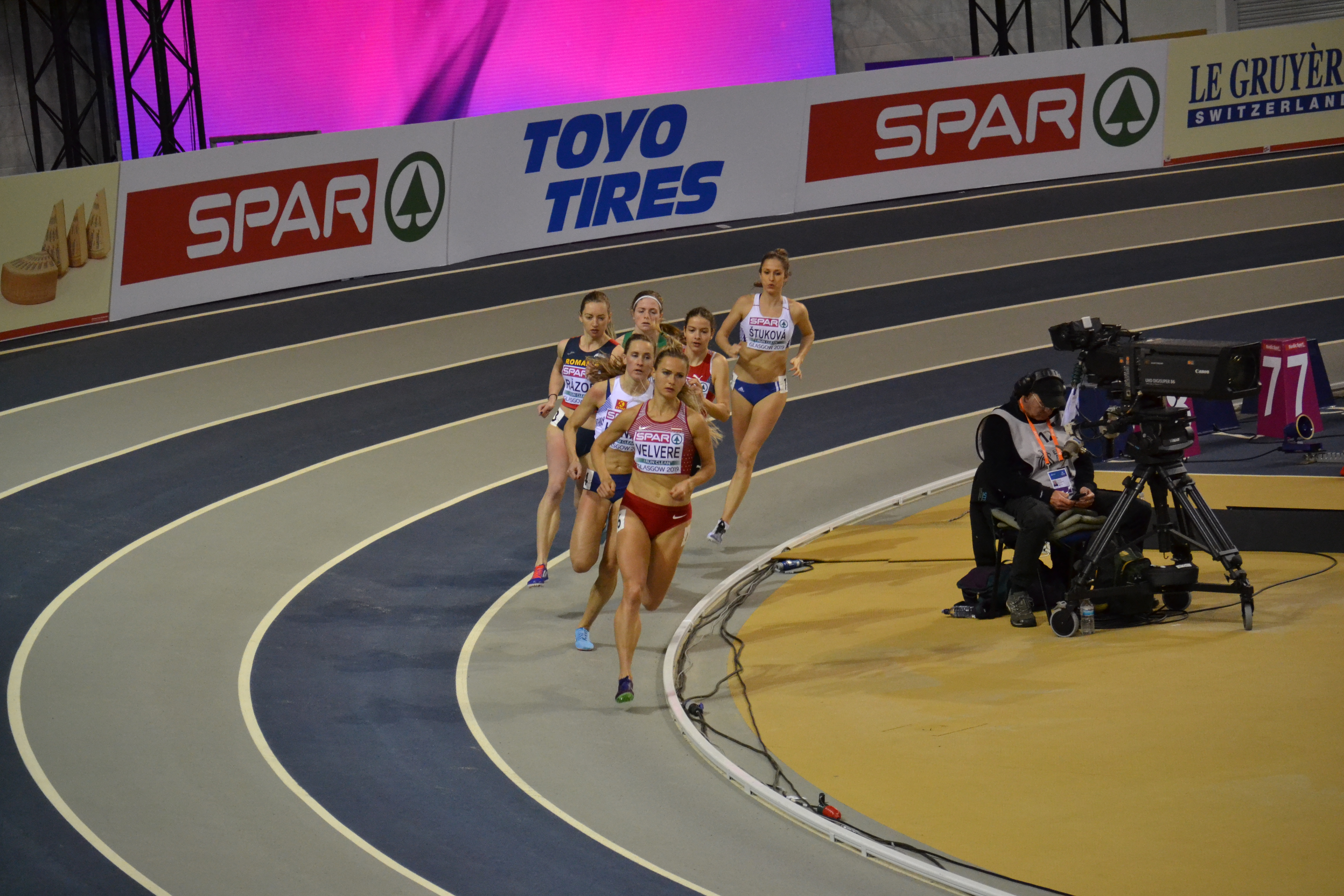
Heat 3

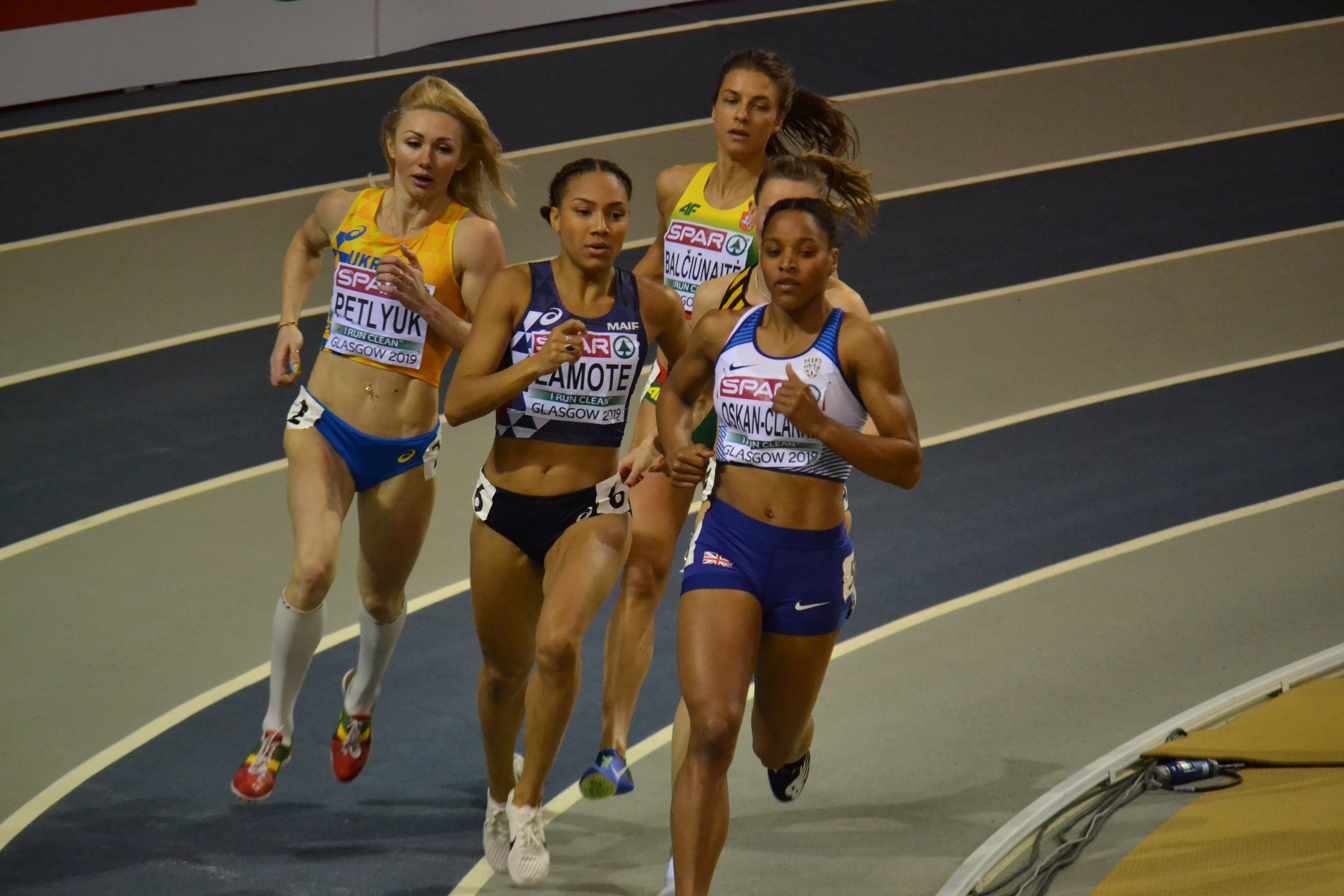
Heat 4

Qualification: First 2 in each heat (Q) and the next 4 fastest (q) advance to the Semifinal.

Rank	Heat	Athlete	Nationality	Time	Note
1	1	Selina Büchel	Switzerland	2:02.02	Q
2	1	Adelle Tracey	Great Britain	2:02.51	Q
3	2	Esther Guerrero	Spain	2:02.95	Q
4	4	Renée Eykens	Belgium	2:03.07	Q
5	1	Zoya Naumov	Spain	2:03.16	q
6	2	Lovisa Lindh	Sweden	2:03.38	Q
7	4	Shelayna Oskan-Clarke	Great Britain	2:03.50	Q
8	4	Rénelle Lamote	France	2:03.54	q
9	2	Mari Smith	Great Britain	2:03.77	q
10	2	Olha Lyakhova	Ukraine	2:04.22	q
11	1	Sara Kuivisto	Finland	2:04.24	
12	1	Charline Mathias	Luxembourg	2:04.73	
13	4	Eglė Balčiūnaitė	Lithuania	2:05.06	
14	3	Līga Velvere	Latvia	2:05.37	Q
15	3	Bianca Răzor	Romania	2:05.55	Q
16	3	Hedda Hynne	Norway	2:05.73	
17	4	Tetyana Petlyuk	Ukraine	2:05.84	
18	3	Síofra Cléirigh Büttner	Ireland	2:06.00	
19	3	Delia Sclabas	Switzerland	2:06.07	
20	3	Alexandra Štuková	Slovakia	2:06.58	
21	2	Charlotte Pizzo	France	2:06.93	

=== Semifinals ===
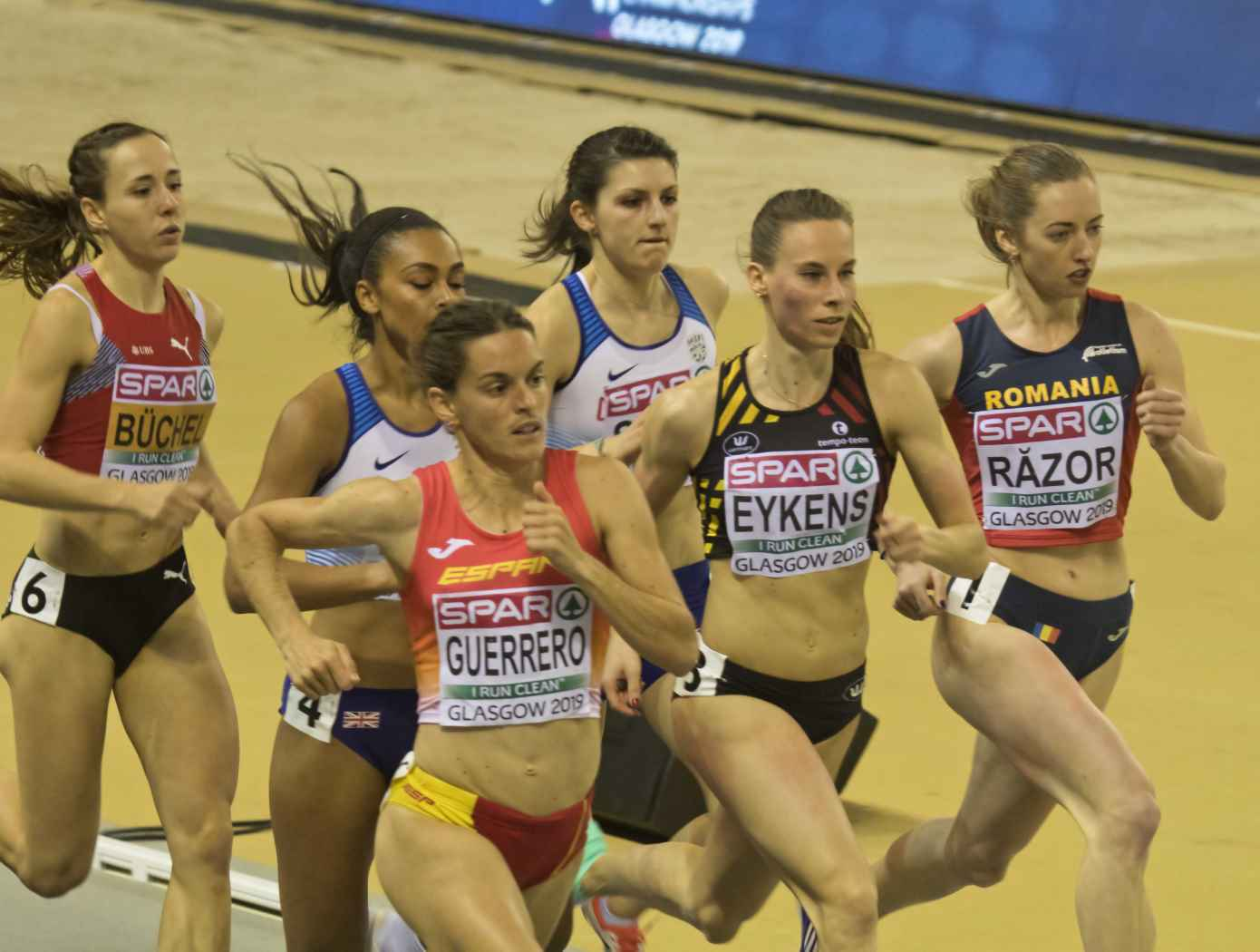
Semifinal 1

Qualification: First 3 in each heat (Q) advance to the Final.

Rank	Heat	Athlete	Nationality	Time	Note
1	1	Esther Guerrero	Spain	2:02.43	Q
2	1	Renée Eykens	Belgium	2:02.85	Q
3	1	Mari Smith	Great Britain	2:02.93	Q
4	2	Rénelle Lamote	France	2:02.94	Q
5	1	Selina Büchel	Switzerland	2:02.98	
6	2	Shelayna Oskan-Clarke	Great Britain	2:03.11	Q
7	1	Adelle Tracey	Great Britain	2:03.26	
8	2	Olha Lyakhova	Ukraine	2:03.60	Q
9	1	Bianca Răzor	Romania	2:03.65	PB
10	2	Līga Velvere	Latvia	2:04.06	
11	2	Zoya Naumov	Spain	2:04.50	
12	2	Lovisa Lindh	Sweden	2:04.54	

=== Final ===
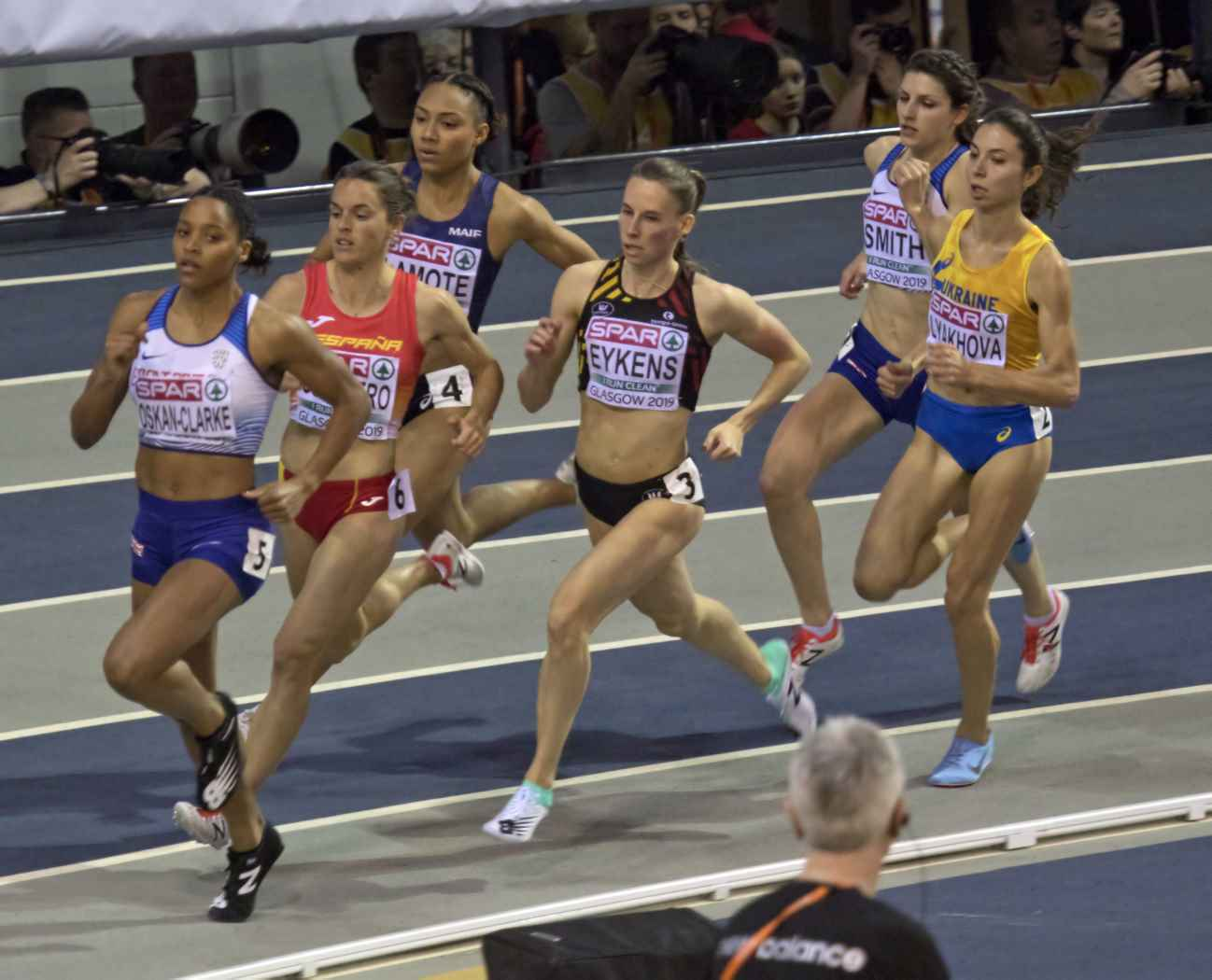
The winner Shelayna Oskan-Clarke led for most of the distance

Rank	Name	Nationality	Time	Notes
1st place, gold medalist(s)	Shelayna Oskan-Clarke	Great Britain	2:02.58	
2nd place, silver medalist(s)	Rénelle Lamote	France	2:03.00	
3rd place, bronze medalist(s)	Olha Lyakhova	Ukraine	2:03.24	
4	Renée Eykens	Belgium	2:03.32	
5	Mari Smith	Great Britain	2:03.45	
6	Esther Guerrero	Spain	2:04.07	
