= 2018 European Athletics Championships – Women's 800 metres =

Women's 800 metres at the 2018 European Athletics Championships
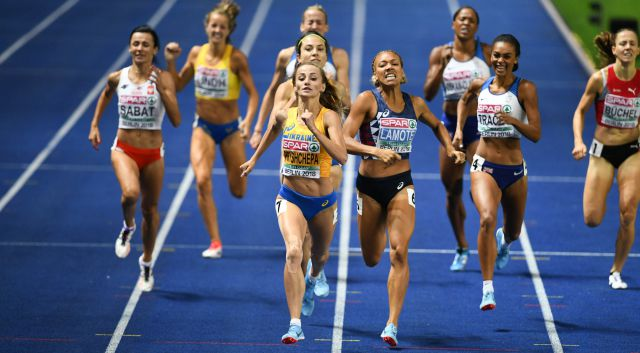
- Nataliya Pryshchepa of Ukraine and Rénelle Lamote of France racing ahead of the other athletes in the final
- Venue: Olympiastadion
- Location: Berlin, Germany
- Dates: 7 August 2018 (round 1); 8 August 2018 (semi-finals); 10 August 2018 (final)
- Competitors: 32 from 22 nations
- Winning time: 2:00.38 min

Medalists
gold medal	Nataliya Pryshchepa	Ukraine
silver medal	Rénelle Lamote	France
bronze medal	Olha Lyakhova	Ukraine

The women's 800 metres at the 2018 European Athletics Championships was held over three rounds at the Olympiastadion in Berlin, Germany, from 7 to 10 August 2018.

Thirty two athletes from twenty-two nations competed in round 1, where sixteen athletes advanced to the semi-finals. From there, nine athletes advanced to the final, which was won by Nataliya Pryshchepa of Ukraine in 2:00.38 min, followed by Rénelle Lamote of France in second place and Olha Lyakhova of Ukraine in third place.

== Background ==
In the 800 metres outdoors, athletes run two laps on a 400-metre track, starting in separate lanes before breaking for the inside lanes after the first bend.

Records before the 2018 European Athletics Championships
Record	Athlete (nation)	Time	Location	Date
World record	Jarmila Kratochvílová (TCH)	1:53.28	Munich, West Germany	26 July 1983
European record	Jarmila Kratochvílová (TCH)	1:53.28	Munich, West Germany	26 July 1983
Championship record	Olga Mineyeva (URS)	1:55.41	Athens, Greece	8 September 1982
World leading	Caster Semenya (RSA)	1:54.25	Paris, France	30 June 2018
European leading	Rénelle Lamote (FRA)	1:58.83	Monaco	20 July 2018

== Results ==
=== Round 1 ===
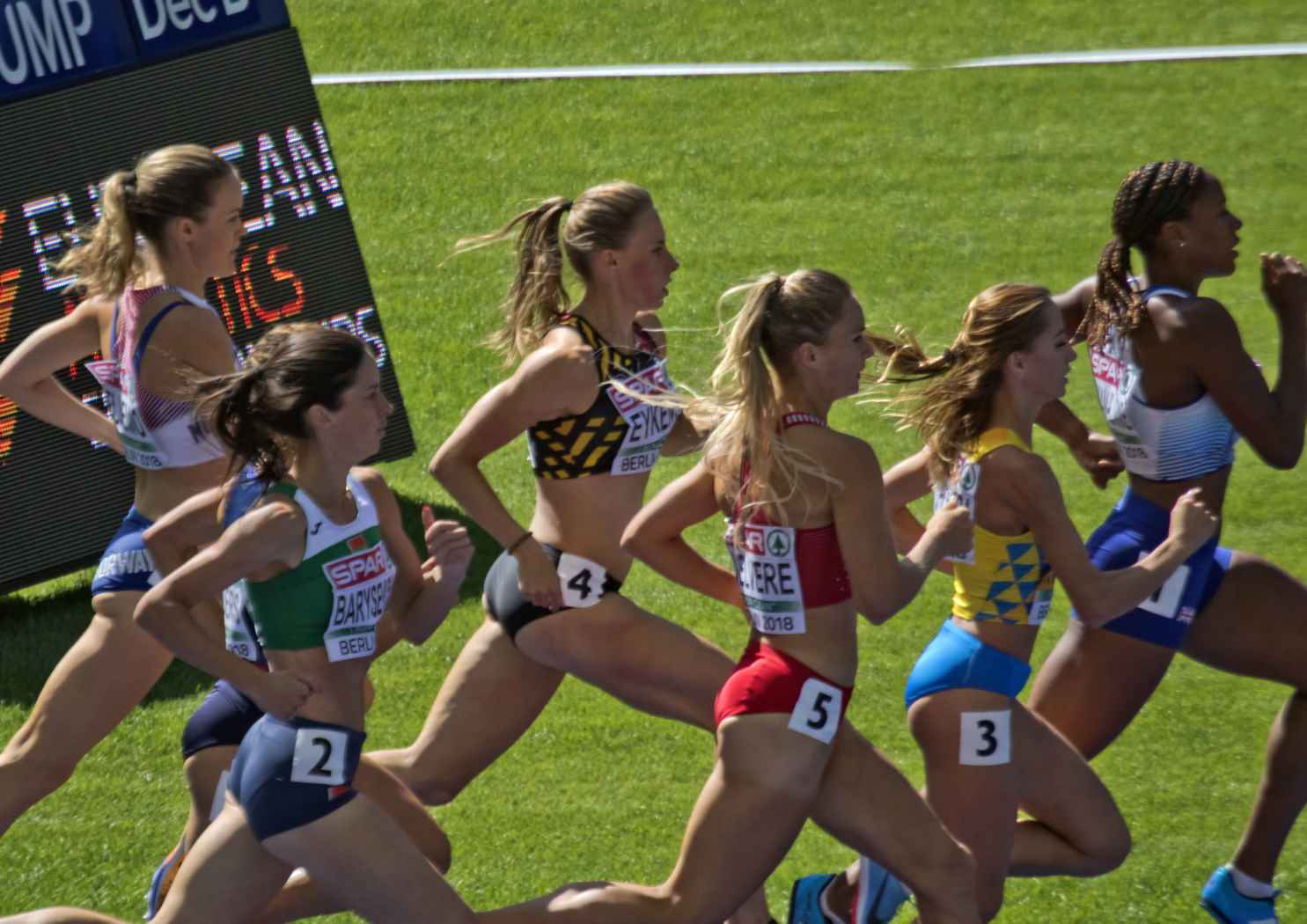
Third heat of round 1

On 7 August 2018, thirty-two athletes from twenty-two nations competed in the four heats of round 1, starting at 11:05 (UTC+2). Sixteen athletes, the first three athletes in each heat (Q) and the next fastest four athletes overall (q), qualified for the semi-finals. In the second heat, Lore Hoffmann of Switzerland ran a personal best (PB) of 2:02.23 min. One of the non-automatic qualifiers came from the first heat and four from the fourth heat.

Results of round 1
Rank	Heat	Lane	Athlete	Nation	Time	Note
1	1	4	Olha Lyakhova	Ukraine	2:00.26	Q, SB
2	1	8	Lynsey Sharp	Great Britain & N.I.	2:00.32	Q
3	1	7	Selina Büchel	Switzerland	2:00.42	Q, SB
4	1	6	Angelika Cichocka	Poland	2:01.01	q, SB
5	4	3	Hanna Hermansson	Sweden	2:01.33	Q
6	4	4	Rénelle Lamote	France	2:01.34	Q
7	4	5	Christina Hering	Germany	2:01.57	Q
8	4	6	Anna Sabat	Poland	2:01.67	q
9	2	2	Adelle Tracey	Great Britain & N.I.	2:01.91	Q
10	2	5	Charline Mathias	Luxembourg	2:02.08	Q
11	4	7	Aníta Hinriksdóttir	Iceland	2:02.15	q
12	4	8	Eglė Balčiūnaitė	Lithuania	2:02.18	q, SB
13	2	4	Lore Hoffmann	Switzerland	2:02.23	Q, PB
14	2	3	Cynthia Anaïs	France	2:02.27	
15	1	2	Yusneysi Santiusti	Italy	2:02.46	
16	4	2	Gabriela Gajanová	Slovakia	2:02.57	
17	4	1	Sara Kuivisto	Finland	2:02.62	
18	2	8	Sanne Wolters-Verstegen	Netherlands	2:02.72	
19	2	7	Elena Bellò	Italy	2:02.77	
20	1	3	Síofra Cléirigh Büttner	Ireland	2:02.80	
21	1	5	Natalia Evangelidou	Cyprus	2:03.38	
22	1	1	Bianka Kéri	Hungary	2:03.44	SB
23	3	3	Nataliya Pryshchepa	Ukraine	2:04.07	Q
24	3	1	Shelayna Oskan-Clarke	Great Britain & N.I.	2:04.08	Q
25	2	1	Claire Mooney	Ireland	2:04.26	
26	3	8	Lovisa Lindh	Sweden	2:04.28	Q
27	3	7	Claudia Saunders	France	2:04.46	
28	3	2	Daryia Barysevich	Belarus	2:04.65	
29	3	5	Līga Velvere	Latvia	2:05.13	
30	3	6	Yngvild Elvemo	Norway	2:05.79	
31	4	8	Gresa Bakrraqi	Kosovo	2:14.22	
32	3	4	Renée Eykens	Belgium	2:56.24	
	2	6	Hedda Hynne	Norway	DNS	

=== Semi-finals ===
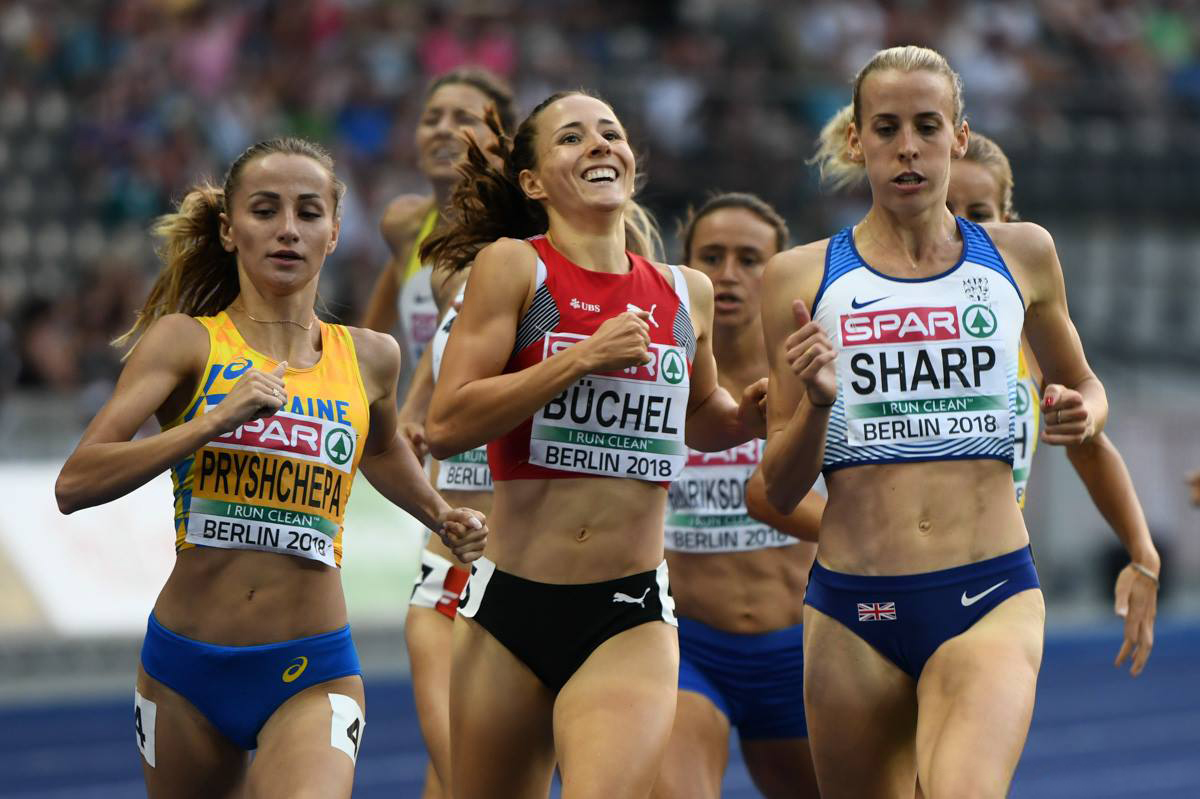
First heat of the semi-finals

On 8 August 2018, sixteen athletes from ten nations competed in the two heats of the semi-finals, starting at 19:55 (UTC+2). Eight athletes, the first three athletes in each heat (Q) and the next fastest two athletes overall (q), qualified for the final. In the first heat, Aníta Hinriksdóttir of Iceland was disqualified (DQ) for violating IAAF rule 163.2 (b) for jostling or obstruction and Lovisa Lindh of Sweden qualified by referee (qR) for the final as additional athlete. In the second heat, automatic qualifiers Adelle Tracey of Great Britain and Northern Ireland and Anna Sabat of Poland ran personal bests (PB) of 1:59.86 min and 2:00.32 min respectively, and Lore Hoffmann of Switzerland further improved her personal bests to 2:01.67 min, but she did not qualify for the final.

Results of the semi-finals
Rank	Heat	Lane	Athlete	Nation	Time	Note
1	2	5	Rénelle Lamote	France	1:59.44	Q
2	2	7	Adelle Tracey	Great Britain & N.I.	1:59.86	Q, PB
3	2	8	Anna Sabat	Poland	2:00.32	Q, PB
4	2	3	Shelayna Oskan-Clarke	Great Britain & N.I.	2:00.39	q, SB
5	2	4	Olha Lyakhova	Ukraine	2:00.47	q
6	2	1	Hanna Hermansson	Sweden	2:00.52	SB
7	2	2	Lore Hoffmann	Switzerland	2:01.67	PB
8	2	6	Charline Mathias	Luxembourg	2:02.01	
9	1	4	Nataliya Pryshchepa	Ukraine	2:02.71	Q
10	1	3	Lynsey Sharp	Great Britain & N.I.	2:02.73	Q
11	1	5	Selina Büchel	Switzerland	2:02.84	Q
12	1	7	Angelika Cichocka	Poland	2:03.14	
13	1	1	Lovisa Lindh	Sweden	2:03.25	qR
14	1	6	Christina Hering	Germany	2:04.04	
15	1	2	Eglė Balčiūnaitė	Lithuania	2:04.60	
	1	8	Aníta Hinriksdóttir	Iceland	DQ	163.2 (b)

=== Final ===
On 10 August 2018, nine athletes from six nations competed in the final at 21:20 (UTC+2). The race was won by Nataliya Pryshchepa of Ukraine in 2:00.38 min, followed by Rénelle Lamote of France in second place in 2:00.62 min and Olha Lyakhova of Ukraine in third place in 2:00.79 min.

Results of the final
Rank	Lane	Athlete	Nation	Time	Note
1st place, gold medalist(s)	7	Nataliya Pryshchepa	Ukraine	2:00.38	
2nd place, silver medalist(s)	6	Rénelle Lamote	France	2:00.62	
3rd place, bronze medalist(s)	8	Olha Lyakhova	Ukraine	2:00.79	
4	4	Adelle Tracey	Great Britain & N.I.	2:00.86	
5	8	Anna Sabat	Poland	2:01.26	
6	2	Lynsey Sharp	Great Britain & N.I.	2:01.83	
7	1	Selina Büchel	Switzerland	2:02.05	
8	3	Shelayna Oskan-Clarke	Great Britain & N.I.	2:02.26	
9	8	Lovisa Lindh	Sweden	2:02.36	SB
