= Shelayna Oskan-Clarke =

British middle-distance runner

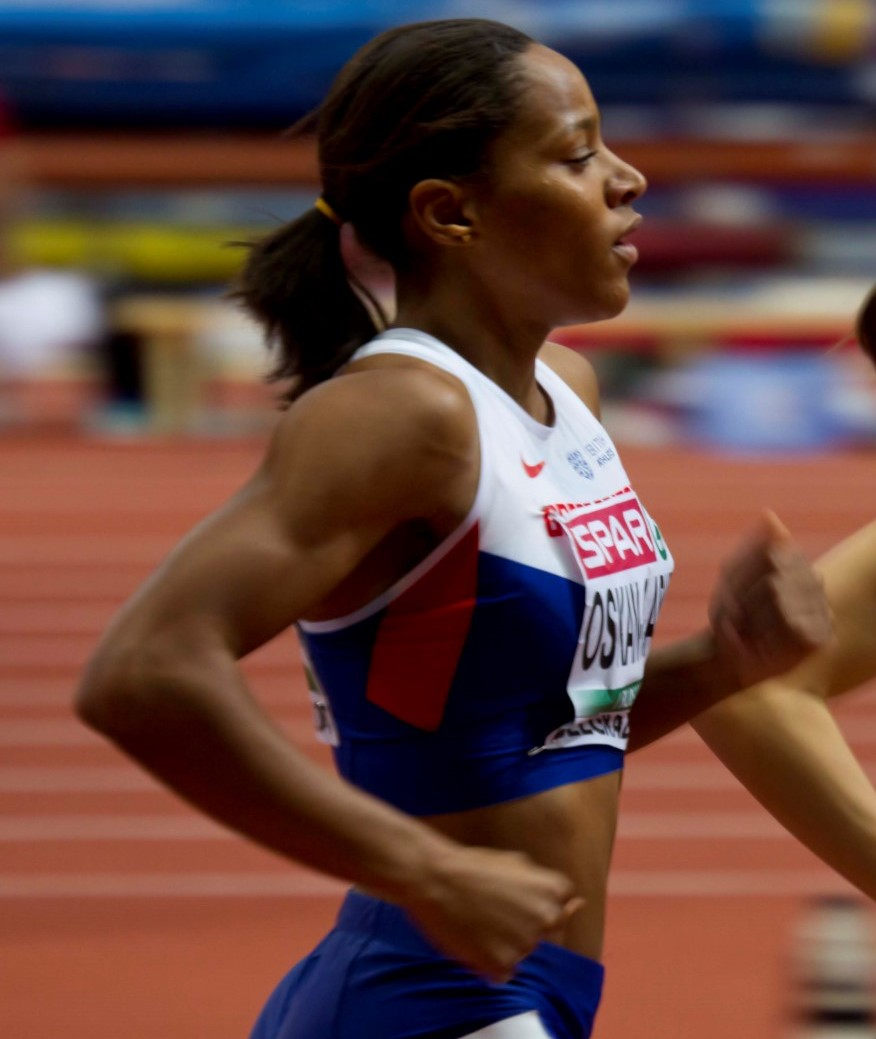
- Oskan-Clarke in 2017

Personal information
- Nationality: British
- Born: Shelayna Oskan; 20 January 1990 (age 36) South London, England
- Education: Brunel University London
- Height: 1.72 m (5 ft 8 in)
- Weight: 64 kg (141 lb)

Sport
- Sport: Athletics
- Event: 800 metres
- Club: Windsor, Slough, Eton and Hounslow AC; Brunel Uni London
- Coached by: Jon Bigg (2016–); Ayo Falola (2010-2015); Rodger Hughes (2007–2010); Keith Elliot (2004-2007); Geoff Bayles (2004-2007)

Achievements and titles
- Olympic finals: 2016 – Semifinalist
Medal record
Women's athletics
Representing Great Britain
World Indoor Championships
Bronze medal – third place	2018 Birmingham	800 m
European Indoor Championships
Gold medal – first place	2019 Glasgow	800 m
Silver medal – second place	2017 Belgrade	800 m

Shelayna Oskan-Clarke (born 20 January 1990) is a British middle-distance runner. She competed in the 800 metres event at the 2015 World Championships in Athletics in Beijing, Where she finished 5th in the final. In 2016, she won the women's 800 m at the Anniversary Games, and also reached the semi-final at the Rio Olympic Games, missing out on a place in the final. In 2019, Shelayna took the gold medal at the European Athletics Indoor Championships in Glasgow.

== International competitions ==
Year	Competition	Venue	Position	Event	Notes
Representing Great Britain and England
2008	Commonwealth Youth Games	Pune, India	5th	400 m	55.77
2015	European Indoor Championship	Prague, Czech Republic	14th (h)	800 m	2:05.08
2015	World Championship	Beijing, China	5th	800 m	1:58.99
2016	Olympic Games	Rio de Janeiro, Brazil	10th (sf)	800 m	1:59.45
2017	European Indoor Championships	Belgrade, Serbia	2nd	800 m	2:00.39
2017	World Championships	London, United Kingdom	22nd (sf)	800 m	2:02.26
2018	World Indoor Championships	Birmingham, United Kingdom	3rd	800 m	1:59.81
2018	Commonwealth Games	Gold Coast, Australia	12th (h)	800 m	2:00.81
2018	European Championships	Berlin, Germany	8h	800 m	2:02.26
2019	European Indoor Championships	Glasgow, United Kingdom	1st	800 m	2:01.16
2019	World Championships	Doha, Qatar	24th (sf)	800 m	2:10.89

== Personal bests ==
Outdoor

- 400 metres – 53.20 (Birmingham 2011)
- 800 metres – 1:58.86 (Beijing 2015)
- 1500 metres – 4:28.29 (Watford 2014)

Indoor

- 400 metres – 54.48 (Birmingham 2012)
- 800 metres – 1:59.81 (Birmingham 2018)
