= Rénelle Lamote =

French middle-distance runner

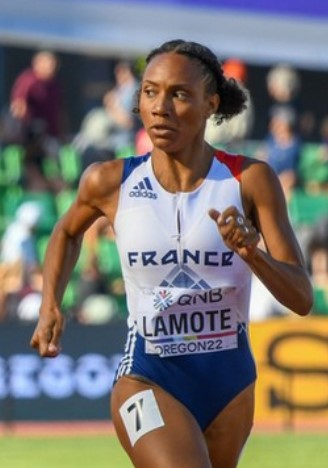
- Lamote at the 2022 World Championships in Eugene

Personal information
- Born: 26 December 1993 (age 32) Coulommiers, France
- Height: 165 cm (5 ft 5 in)
- Weight: 59 kg (130 lb)

Sport
- Country: France
- Sport: Athletics
- Event: 800 metres
- Club: Racing Multi Athlon
- Coached by: Gilles Garcia, Bruno Gajer
Medal record
Women's athletics
Representing France
European Championships
Silver medal – second place	2016 Amsterdam	800 m
Silver medal – second place	2018 Berlin	800 m
Silver medal – second place	2022 Munich	800 m
European Indoor Championships
Silver medal – second place	2019 Glasgow	800 m
European U23 Championships
Gold medal – first place	2015 Tallinn	800 m

Rénelle Lamote (born 26 December 1993) is a French middle-distance runner who specialises in the 800 metres. She is a triple European Athletics Championships silver medallist in the event from 2016, 2018 and 2022. Lamote won also a silver at the 2019 European Indoor Championships.

She was the 800 m 2015 European Under-23 champion.

== Career ==
Rénelle Lamote was born to an Guadeloupean mother and a French father.

She represented her country at the 2014 European Championships and 2015 European Indoor Championships, reaching the semifinals on both occasions.

Her personal bests in the 800 metres are: 1:57.06 outdoors (London 2024) and 2:01.97 indoors (Glasgow 2015).

== Competition record ==
Representing France
Year	Competition	Venue	Position	Event	Notes
2012	World Junior Championships	Barcelona, Spain	16th (sf)	800 m	2:05.83
2013	European U23 Championships	Tampere, Finland	23rd (h)	800 m	2:07.63
2013	Jeux de la Francophonie	Nice, France	13th (h)	800 m	2:10.89
2014	IAAF World Relays	Nassau, Bahamas	6th	4 × 800 m relay	8:17.54
2014	European Championships	Zürich, Switzerland	13th (sf)	800 m	2:03.90
2015	European Indoor Championships	Prague, Czech Republic	9th (sf)	800 m	2:09.06
2015	European U23 Championships	Tallinn, Estonia	1st	800 m	2:00.19
2015	World Championships	Beijing, China	8th	800 m	1:59.70
2016	European Championships	Amsterdam, Netherlands	2nd	800 m	2:00.19
2016	Olympic Games	Rio de Janeiro, Brazil	44th (h)	800 m	2:02.19
2018	European Championships	Berlin, Germany	2nd	800 m	2:00.62
2019	European Indoor Championships	Glasgow, United Kingdom	2nd	800 m	2:03.00
2019	World Championships	Doha, Qatar	20th (sf)	800 m	2:02.86
2021	Olympic Games	Tokyo, Japan	8th (sf)	800 m	1:59.40
2022	World Championships	Eugene, United States	18th (sf)	800 m	2:00.86
2022	European Championships	Munich, Germany	2nd	800 m	1:59.49
2023	World Championships	Budapest, Hungary	21st (sf)	800 m	2:01.25
2024	Olympic Games	Paris, France	5th	800 m	1:58.19
2025	World Championships	Tokyo, Japan	22nd (sf)	800 m	1:59.94
2026	European Championships	Birmingham, United Kingdom	13th (sf)	800 m	1:59.88
2026	World Ultimate Championship	Budapest, Hungary	14th (h)	800 m	2:01.45
