= Esther Guerrero =

Spanish middle-distance runner (born 1990)

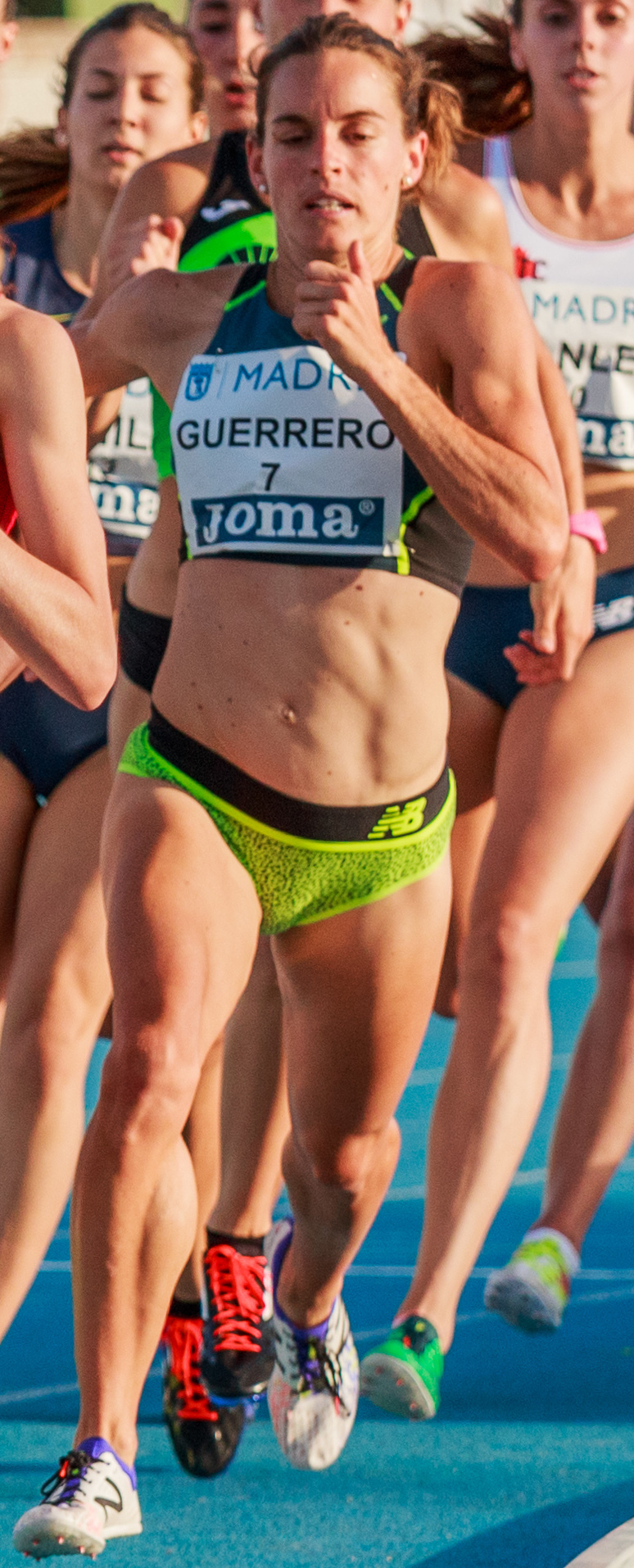
- Esther Guerrero in 2017

Personal information
- Full name: Esther Guerrero Puigdevall
- Born: 7 February 1990 (age 36) Banyoles, Spain
- Height: 1.62 m (5 ft 4 in)
- Weight: 56 kg (123 lb)

Sport
- Country: Spain
- Sport: Track and field
- Event: Middle-distance running
- Club: New Balance Team
- Coached by: Joan Lleonart
Medal record
Women's athletics
Representing Spain
European Cross Country Championships
Gold medal – first place	2018 Tilburg	Mixed relay
Bronze medal – third place	2017 Šamorín	Mixed relay

Esther Guerrero Puigdevall (born 7 February 1990) is a Spanish middle-distance runner competing primarily in the 800 metres. She won two medals for the mixed relay at the European Cross Country Championships.

Guerrero represented her country at the 2016 Rio and 2020 Tokyo Olympics. She is the Spanish record holder for the 2000 metres and the indoor mile. She won multiple national titles.

== Statistics ==
=== Personal bests ===
- 800 metres – 1:59.22 (Doha 2020)
  - 800 metres indoor – 2:01.13 (Madrid 2021)
- 1000 metres – 2:35.64 (Brussels 2020)
  - 1000 metres indoor – 2:38.81 (Birmingham 2022)
- 1500 metres – 3:59.45 (Brussels 2025)
  - 1500 metres indoor – 4:04.86 (Istanbul 2023)
- One mile – 4:22.81 (Brussels 2021)
  - One mile indoor – 4:24.92 (Boston, MA 2023) NR
- 2000 metres – 5:41.30 (Olot 2020) NR
  - 3000 metres indoor – 8:56.61 (Manchester 2022)

=== National titles ===
- Spanish Athletics Championships
  - 800 metres: 2015, 2016, 2017, 2020
  - 1500 metres: 2019, 2020, 2021
- Spanish Indoor Athletics Championships
  - 800 metres: 2015, 2016, 2017, 2018
  - 1500 metres: 2019, 2020, 2021, 2023

=== International competitions ===
Representing Spain
Year	Competition	Venue	Position	Event	Time
2007	World Youth Championships	Ostrava, Czech Republic	39th (h)	800 m	2:15.48
2007	European Youth Olympic Festival	Belgrade, Serbia	10th (h)	800 m	2:13.69
2009	European Junior Championships	Novi Sad, Serbia	10th (h)	800 m	2:08.39
2015	World Championships	Beijing, China	36th (h)	800 m	2:02.64
2016	European Championships	Amsterdam, Netherlands	7th (sf)	800 m	2:01.62
2016	Olympic Games	Rio de Janeiro, Brazil	40th (h)	800 m	2:01.85
2017	European Indoor Championships	Belgrade, Serbia	6th	800 m i	2:03.09
2017	World Championships	London, United Kingdom	27th (h)	800 m	2:02.22
2017	European Cross Country Championships	Šamorín, Slovakia	3rd	Mixed 4 x 1.5 km XC	18:26
2018	World Indoor Championships	Birmingham, United Kingdom	13th (h)	800 m i	2:04.06
2018	Mediterranean Games	Tarragona, Spain	4th	800 m	2:03.35
2018	European Championships	Berlin, Germany	11th	1500 m	4:09.88
2018	Ibero-American Championships	Trujillo, Peru	1st	800 m	2:04.55
2018	Ibero-American Championships	Trujillo, Peru	3rd	4 × 400 m relay	3:38.32
2018	European Cross Country Championships	Tilburg, Netherlands	1st	Mixed 4 x 1.5 km XC	16:10
2019	European Indoor Championships	Glasgow, United Kingdom	6th	800 m i	2:04.07
2019	World Cross Country Championships	Aarhus, Denmark	6th	Mixed 4 x 2 km XC	27:47
2019	World Championships	Doha, Qatar	19th (sf)	1500 m	4:16.66
2021	European Indoor Championships	Toruń, Poland	5th	1500 m i	4:20.45
2021	Olympic Games	Tokyo, Japan	26th (h)	1500 m	4:07.08
2023	European Indoor Championships	Istanbul, Turkey	4th	1500 m i	4:04.86
2023	European Games	Chorzów, Poland	6th	1500 m	4:11.77
2023	World Championships	Budapest, Hungary	10th (sf)	1500 m	4:00.13
2024	World Indoor Championships	Glasgow, United Kingdom	12th	1500 m i	4:12.33
2024	European Championships	Rome, Italy	4th	1500 m	4:06.03
2024	Olympic Games	Paris, France	19th (sf)	1500 m	4:01.94
2025	European Indoor Championships	Apeldoorn, Netherlands	5th	1500 m i	4:09.45
2025	World Indoor Championships	Nanjing, China	9th	1500 m	4:07.76
2025	World Championships	Tokyo, Japan	7th (h)	1500 m	4:02.20
