= Olha Lyakhova =

Ukrainian middle-distance runner (born 1992)

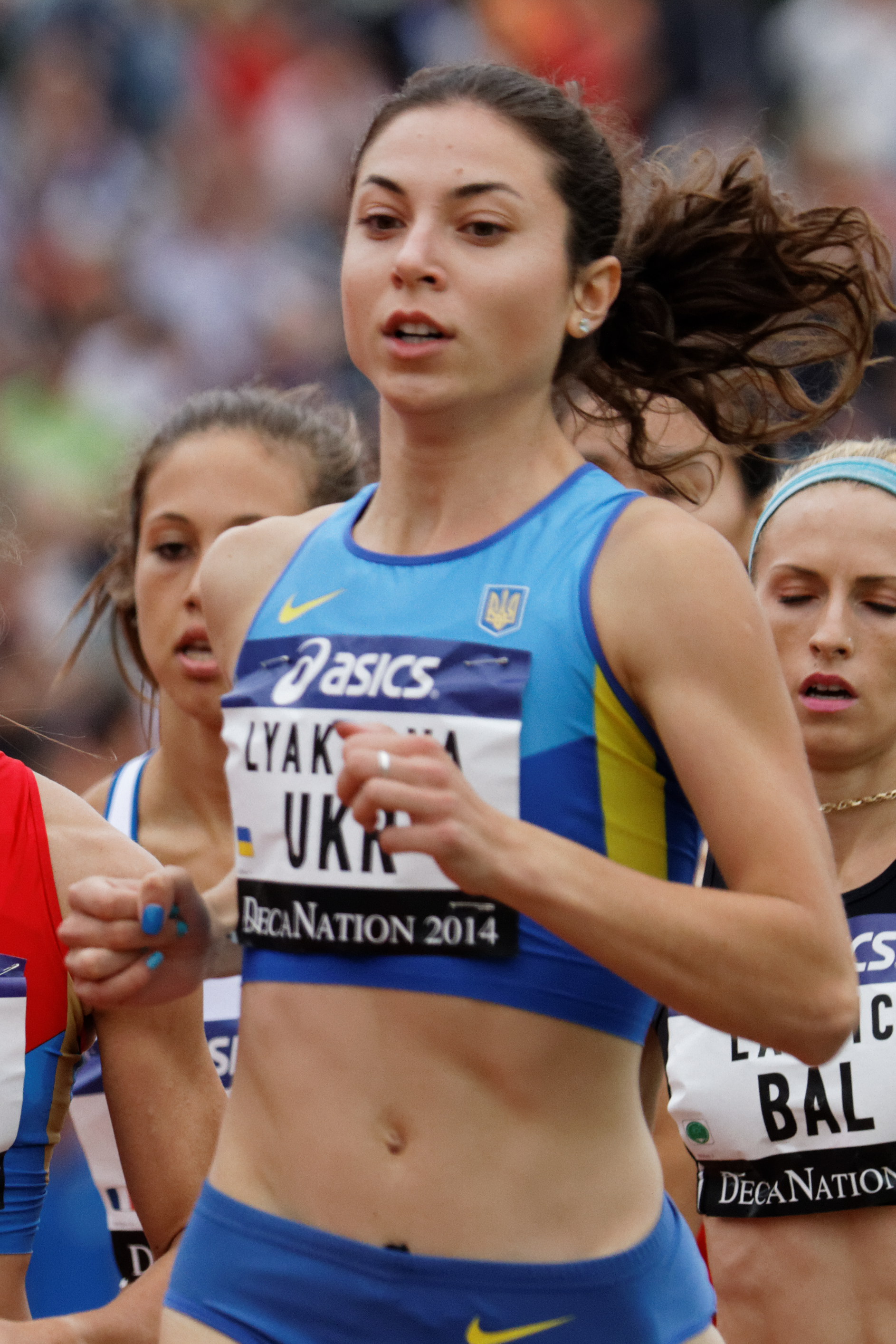
- Olha Lyakhova at the DécaNation 2014

Personal information
- Nationality: Ukrainian
- Born: 18 March 1992 (age 34) Rubizhne, Ukraine
- Height: 1.74 m (5 ft 9 in)
- Weight: 57 kg (126 lb)

Sport
- Sport: Track and field
- Event: 800m
- Club: Avangard
- Coached by: Konstantin Stepantsov; Ivan Smorodsky; Tomasz Lewandowski
Medal record
Women's athletics
Representing Ukraine
European Championships
Silver medal – second place	2014 Zürich	4x400 m relay
Bronze medal – third place	2018 Berlin	800 m
European Team Championships
Gold medal – first place	2017 Lille	800 m
Silver medal – second place	2013 Gateshead	800 m
Silver medal – second place	2017 Lille	4x400 m relay
Bronze medal – third place	2014 Braunschweig	800 m
European Indoor Championships
Bronze medal – third place	2017 Belgrade	4×400 m relay
Bronze medal – third place	2019 Glasgow	800 m

Olha Oleksandrivna Lyakhova (Ukrainian: Ольга Олександрівна Ляхова) (born 18 March 1992) is a Ukrainian middle-distance runner. She won bronze medals at the 2018 European Championships and 2019 European Indoor Championships.

== International competitions ==
Year	Competition	Venue	Position	Event	Notes
Representing Ukraine
2009	World Youth Championships	Brixen, Italy	7th	800 m	2:05.67
2010	World Junior Championships	Moncton, Canada	28th (h)	800 m	2:09.24
2011	European Junior Championships	Tallinn, Estonia	5th	800 m	2:07.16
2013	European Indoor Championships	Gothenburg, Sweden	5th	800 m	2:02.12
2013	European U23 Championships	Tampere, Finland	2nd	800 m	2:01.90
2013	European U23 Championships	Tampere, Finland	4th	4 × 400 m relay	3:31.14
2013	World Championships	Moscow, Russia	19th (h)	800 m	2:00.98
2013	World Championships	Moscow, Russia	4th	4 × 400 m relay	3:27.38
2014	World Indoor Championships	Sopot, Poland	8th (h)	800 m	2:02.71
2014	European Championships	Zürich, Switzerland	1st (h)	4 × 400 m relay	3:28.18
2015	World Championships	Beijing, China	11th (sf)	800 m	1:58.94
2015	World Championships	Beijing, China	6th	4 × 400 m relay	3:25.94
2016	Olympic Games	Rio de Janeiro, Brazil	49th (h)	800 m	2:03.02
2017	European Indoor Championships	Belgrade, Serbia	17th (h)	800 m	2:06.33
2017	European Indoor Championships	Belgrade, Serbia	3rd	4 × 400 m relay	3:32.10
2017	World Championships	London, United Kingdom	26th (h)	800 m	2:02.07
2017	Universiade	Taipei, Taiwan	2nd	800 m	2:03.11
2018	World Indoor Championships	Birmingham, United Kingdom	11th (h)	800 m	2:03.81
2018	European Championships	Berlin, Germany	3rd	800 m	2:00.79
2019	European Indoor Championships	Glasgow, United Kingdom	3rd	800 m	2:03.24
2019	World Championships	Doha, Qatar	8th (sf)	800 m	2:00.72
2019	World Championships	Doha, Qatar	6th	4 × 400 m relay	3:27.48
2022	World Championships	Eugene, United States	28th (h)	800 m	2:02.16
2022	European Championships	Munich, Germany	13th (h)	800 m	2:02.91
2023	World Championships	Budapest, Hungary	49th (h)	800 m	2:03.11
2024	European Championships	Rome, Italy	13th (h)	800 m	2:01.51

== Personal bests ==
Outdoor

- 400 metres – 52.05 (Donetsk 2013)
- 800 metres – 1:58.64 (Rieti 2015)
- 1000 metres – 2:37.46 (Berlin 2018)

Indoor

- 400 metres – 53.42 (Sumy 2017)
- 800 metres – 2:00.92 (Metz 2017)
- 3000 metres – 9:39.62 (Sumy 2019)
