= Līga Velvere-Krūmiņa =

Latvian athlete

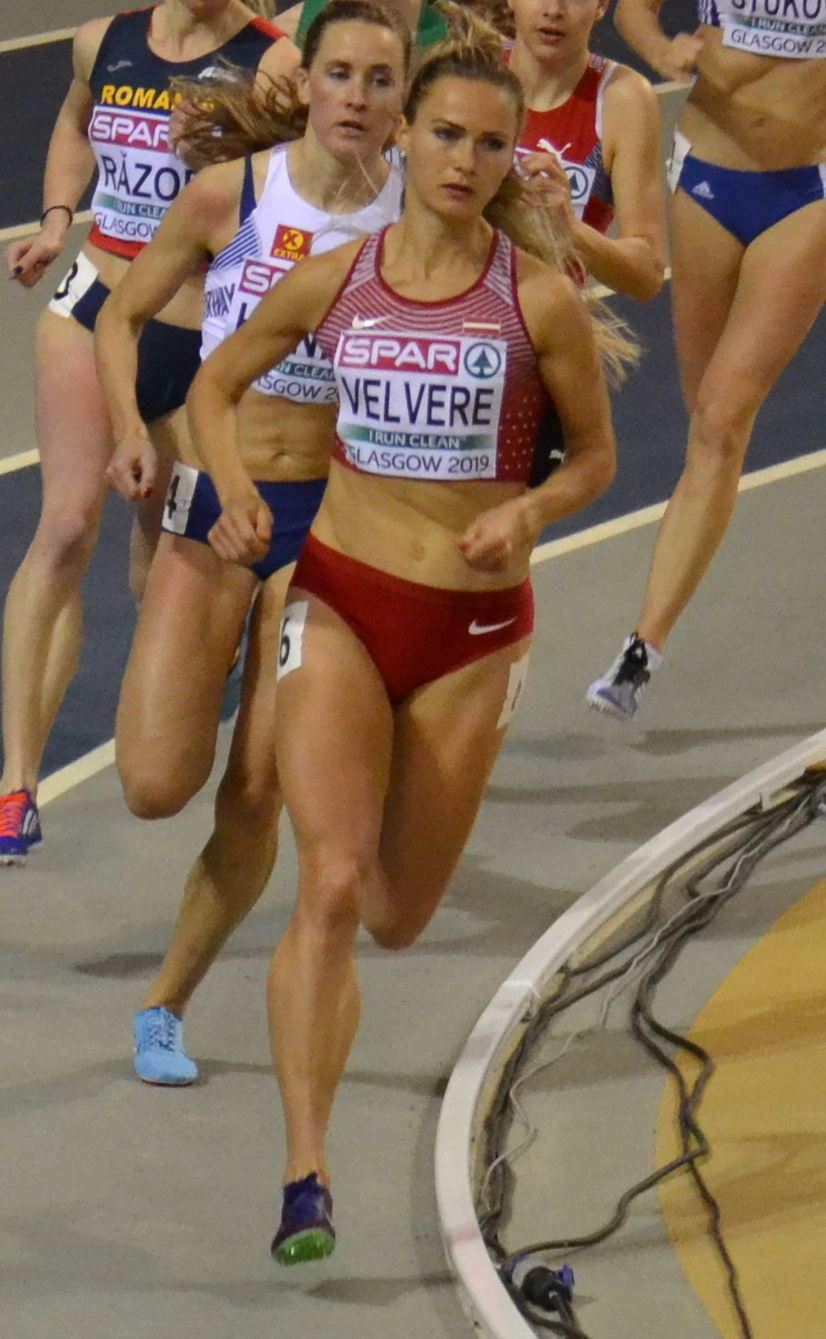
- Līga Velvere in 2019

Personal information
- Born: Līga Velvere; 10 February 1990 (age 36)
- Education: Latvian Academy of Sport Education; University of Idaho
- Height: 1.71 m (5 ft 7 in)
- Weight: 59 kg (130 lb)

Sport
- Sport: Track and field
- Events: 800 m, 400 m hurdles
- College team: Idaho Vandals

Līga Velvere-Krūmiņa (born 10 February 1990) is a Latvian athlete competing in the 800 metres and 400 metres hurdles. She competed at the 2016 IAAF World Indoor Championships without qualifying for the final.

== Career ==
Līga Velvere is known for her success in the 800m race. She represented Latvia at the 2014 European Championship and has since made a name for herself on the international stage.

In February 2016, L. Velvere broke the long-standing Latvian record in the 800m indoor race, previously held by Marika Arent since 1985, with a time of 2:03.08. This was said to be a significant achievement.

L. Velvere continued to improve her personal best over the years, setting new records at various competitions. At the 2016 European Championships in Amsterdam, she reached the semi-finals of the 400m hurdles race and placed 17th overall.

In February 2017, L. Velvere broke her own Latvian record in the 800m indoor race with a time of 2:02.18. She went on to beat this record again in February 2018, winning the IAAF World Tour indoor race series in Glasgow, Scotland, with a time of 2:02.01.

L. Velvere's performances led her to the 2018 World Indoor Championships, where she placed 10th in the 800m race with a time of 2:02.98. In July 2018, she set a new personal record of 2:01.21 at a competition in Kortrijk, Belgium, which was the third fastest run in the history of Latvian athletics.

L. Velvere continued to improve her personal best in the 800m race, setting a new record of 2:00.85 in Karlstad, Sweden, in July 2018, and further improving it to 2:00.75 in Rovereto, Italy, in August of the same year.

On February 12, 2019, L. Velvere set a new Latvian record in the 800m indoor race with a time of 2:01.10 after winning a competition in France. She went on to compete at the 2019 World Championship in Doha, where she reached the semi-finals and placed 23rd overall.

However, L. Velvere's hopes of competing at the 2020 Summer Olympic Games in Tokyo were dashed due to an injury, and she was unable to finish the distance in her 800m discipline preliminaries.

== Competition record ==
Year	Competition	Venue	Position	Event	Notes
Representing Latvia
2007	World Youth Championships	Ostrava, Czech Republic	14th (h)	400 m hurdles	62.12
2007	European Youth Olympic Festival	Belgrade, Serbia	9th (h)	400 m hurdles	62.72
2009	European Junior Championships	Novi Sad, Serbia	15th (h)	400 m hurdles	61.21
2011	European U23 Championships	Ostrava, Czech Republic	17th (h)	400 m hurdles	61.45
2014	European Championships	Zürich, Switzerland	13th (sf)	400 m hurdles	56.87
2016	World Indoor Championships	Portland, United States	13th (h)	800 m	2:05.20
2017	European Indoor Championships	Belgrade, Serbia	16th (h)	800 m	2:06.03^{1}
2018	World Indoor Championship	Birmingham, United Kingdom	10th (h)	800 m	2:02.98
2018	European Championships	Berlin, Germany	29h (h)	800 m	2:05.13
2019	European Indoor Championships	Glasgow, United Kingdom	10th (sf)	800 m	2:04.06
2019	World Championships	Doha, Qatar	23rd (sf)	800 m	2:06.99
2021	European Indoor Championships	Toruń, Poland	24th (h)	800 m	2:06.26
2021	Olympic Games	Tokyo, Japan	–	800 m	DNF
2026	World Road Running Championships	Copenhagen, Denmark	46th	Road mile	5:28.35

^{1}Disqualified in the semifinals

== Personal bests ==
Outdoor

- 800 metres – 2:02.79 (Portland 2015)
- 400 metres hurdles – 56.77 (Ventspils 2015)

Indoor

- 800 metres – 2:02.01 (Glasgow 2018)
