= Selina Rutz-Büchel =

Swiss middle-distance runner

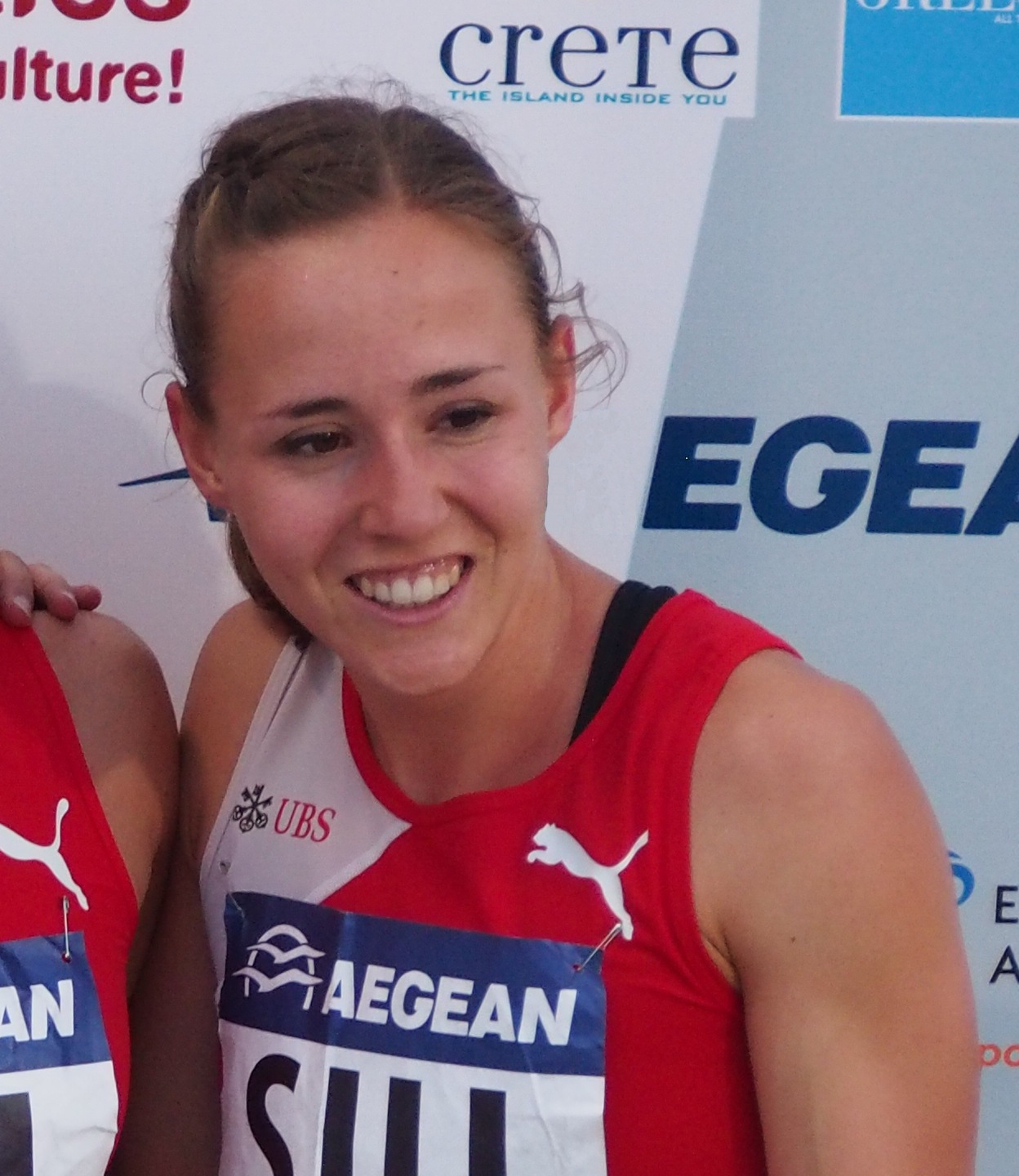
- Selina Büchel during 2015 European Team Championships First League.

Medal record

Women's Athletics

Representing Switzerland

European Indoor Championships
| Gold medal – first place | 2015 Prague | 800 m |
| Gold medal – first place | 2017 Belgrade | 800 m |

Selina Rutz-Büchel (née Büchel; born 26 July 1991) is a Swiss middle-distance runner who competes in the 800 metres. She holds a personal best of 1:57.95 minutes for the event, which she set in 2015 in Paris.

She is a six-time Swiss champion indoors and outdoors. She represented Switzerland in age-category international competitions and her first senior medal came in the European Team Championships in 2013. She was a semi-finalist at the 2013 European Athletics Indoor Championships and came fourth at the 2014 IAAF World Indoor Championships. In 2015, she remained undefeated indoors and crowned her indoor campaign with the European indoor title. At the 2016 European Athletics Championships held in Amsterdam, she narrowly missed a medal and finished fourth, setting a season best of 2:00.30 in the semis.

== Career ==
=== Early life and career ===
Born in Mosnang, she began running as a child. She became more serious about the sport as a teenager and joined the local sports club KTV Bütschwil. Initially she did long-distance road running but focused on middle-distance track running after working with the club. She made her first appearances at the senior national level in 2008, coming fourth in the 800 m at the Swiss indoors and seventh at the Swiss outdoor championships. She improved her best to 2:06.20 minutes at the 2009 European Athletics Junior Championships, but was a little slower in the final and finished seventh. She also ran in the 1500 metres that year and was runner-up at the Swiss championships and ended the year with a best of 4:29.01 minutes.

Büchel ran a personal best of 2:05.95 minutes in 2010, but did not get past the semi-final stage at the 2010 World Junior Championships in Athletics. She reached the top of the national team in 2011, winning the 800 m titles indoors and outdoors. She continued to improve her times, recording 2:04.25 minutes for fifth at the 2011 European Athletics U23 Championships. She repeated as Swiss indoor champion in 2012, but missed part of the outdoor season due to injury. She did manage to improve her best to 2:04.02 minutes in August, however.

=== Senior competition ===
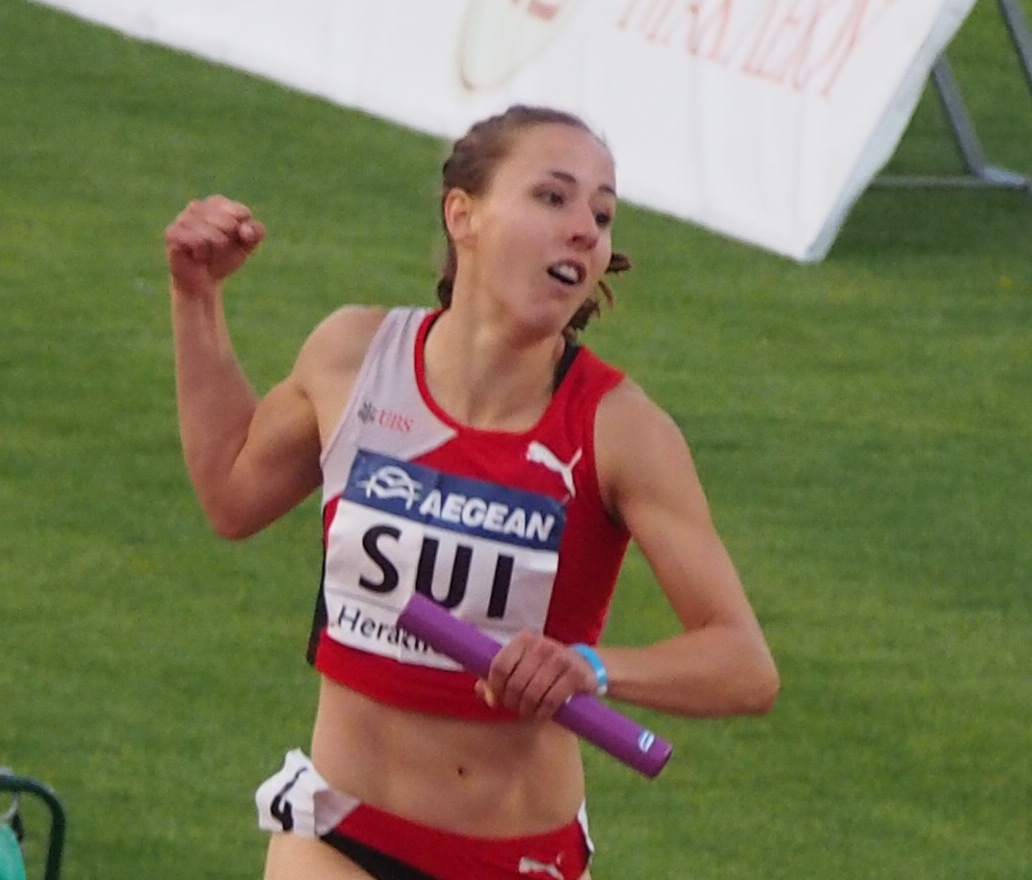
Selina Büchel during 4 × 400 women's relay at 2015 European Team Championships First League.

She achieved international success for the first time in 2013. After winning another national indoor title she ran a best of 2:01.64 minutes in the semi-finals at the 2013 European Athletics Indoor Championships. She won bronze medals at the 2013 European Team Championships first league and the 2013 European Athletics U23 Championships. A second outdoor national title was followed by a new outdoor best of 2:01.66 minutes in Amsterdam. She gave a surprise performance at the 2014 IAAF World Indoor Championships, improving to 2:00.93 minutes to win her semi-final before coming fourth in the 800 m final.

== Personal bests ==
Outdoor

- 400 metres – 53.99 sec (2016)
- 800 metres – 1:57.95 min (2015)
- 1500 metres – 4:27.96 min (2011)

Indoor

- 800 metres – 2:00.38 min (2017)

== Competition record ==
| Year | Competition | Venue | Position | Event | Notes |
Representing Switzerland
| 2009 | European Junior Championships | Novi Sad, Serbia | 7th | 800 m | 2:07.93 |
| 2010 | World Junior Championships | Moncton, Canada | 20th (sf) | 800 m | 2:07.28 |
| 2011 | European U23 Championships | Ostrava, Czech Republic | 5th | 800 m | 2:04.25 |
| 2013 | European Indoor Championships | Gothenburg, Sweden | 4th (sf) | 800 m | 2:01.64 |
| 2013 | European Team Championships | Dublin, Ireland | 3rd | 800 m | 2:03.80 |
| 2013 | European U23 Championships | Tampere, Finland | 3rd | 800 m | 2:02.74 |
| 2014 | World Indoor Championships | Sopot, Poland | 4th | 800 m | 2:01.06 |
| 2015 | European Indoor Championships | Prague, Czech Republic | 1st | 800 m | 2:01.95 |
| 2015 | World Championships | Beijing, China | 8th (sf) | 800 m | 1:58.63 |
| 2016 | European Championships | Amsterdam, Netherlands | 4th | 800 m | 2:00.47 |
| 2016 | Olympic Games | Rio de Janeiro, Brazil | 8th (sf) | 800 m | 1:59.35 |
| 2017 | European Indoor Championships | Belgrade, Serbia | 1st | 800 m | 2:00.38 NR |
| 2017 | World Championships | London, United Kingdom | 9th (sf) | 800 m | 1:59.35 |
| 2018 | World Indoor Championship | Birmingham, United Kingdom | 6th | 800 m | 2:03.01 |
| 2018 | European Championships | Berlin, Germany | 7th | 800 m | 2:02.05 |
| 2019 | European Indoor Championships | Glasgow, United Kingdom | 5th (sf) | 800 m | 2:02.98 |
| 2019 | World Championships | Doha, Qatar | 25th (h) | 800 m | 2:03.38 |
| 2021 | European Indoor Championships | Toruń, Poland | 17th (sf) | 800 m | 2:07.47 |

== National titles ==
- 800 m indoor: 2011, 2012, 2013, 2014
- 800 m outdoor: 2011, 2013
