= 2018 IAAF World Indoor Championships – Women's 800 metres =

Women's 800 metres at the 2018 IAAF World Indoor Championships
- Venue: Arena Birmingham
- Dates: 3–4 March
- Competitors: 15 from 12 nations
- Winning time: 1:58.31 WL

Medalists
gold medal	Francine Niyonsaba	Burundi
silver medal	Ajeé Wilson	United States
bronze medal	Shelayna Oskan-Clarke	Great Britain

Video on YouTube Official Video

The women's 800 metres at the 2018 IAAF World Indoor Championships took place on 3 and 4 March 2018.

== Summary ==
In the heats, Olympic and returning bronze medalist Margaret Wambui was the victim of another disqualification.

In the final, Ajeé Wilson sprinted the first turn to take the lead at the break. But then she relaxed into a more reasonable pace. Habitam Alemu took up the second position for a lap before, defending champion Francine Niyonsaba came forward at a faster pace. Wilson again sprinted to maintain position. After a 59.02 first 400m, Alemu accelerate on the backstretch, to try to pass Niyonsaba, who sprinted a few steps to rebuff that effort. At the bell, Niyonsaba attacked again, but Wilson sprinted the penultimate turn to keep Niyonsaba on the outside, the two pulling away from the rest of the field. Well behind the battle for the lead, Shelayna Oskan-Clarke had been running in fifth place, began to move forward. On the final backstretch, Niyonsaba ran past Wilson, and pulled away on the homestretch, celebrating a 5-metre win to retain her championship. Wilson repeated her silver medal from 2016. Oskan-Clarke took Alemu coming off the final turn to take bronze.

== Results ==
=== Heats ===
The heats were started on 3 March at 11:50.

Rank	Heat	Lane	Name	Nationality	Time	Notes
1	3	2	Francine Niyonsaba	Burundi	2:00.99	Q, SB
2	2	5	Shelayna Oskan-Clarke	Great Britain	2:01.76	Q
3	2	4	Selina Büchel	Switzerland	2:01.84	q
4	1	3	Ajeé Wilson	United States	2:01.90	Q
5	2	6	Raevyn Rogers	United States	2:02.17	q
6	1	6	Habitam Alemu	Ethiopia	2:02.18	q
7	1	5	Angelika Cichocka	Poland	2:02.25	
8	3	6	Natoya Goule	Jamaica	2:02.49	
9	3	3	Mhairi Hendry	Great Britain	2:02.65	
10	1	4	Līga Velvere	Latvia	2:02.98	
11	3	4	Olha Lyakhova	Ukraine	2:03.81	
12	2	3	Jenna Westaway	Canada	2:03.91	
13	1	2	Esther Guerrero	Spain	2:04.06	
14	2	2	Winny Chebet	Kenya	2:18.31	SB
	3	5	Margaret Wambui	Kenya	DQ	163.3(a)

=== Final ===
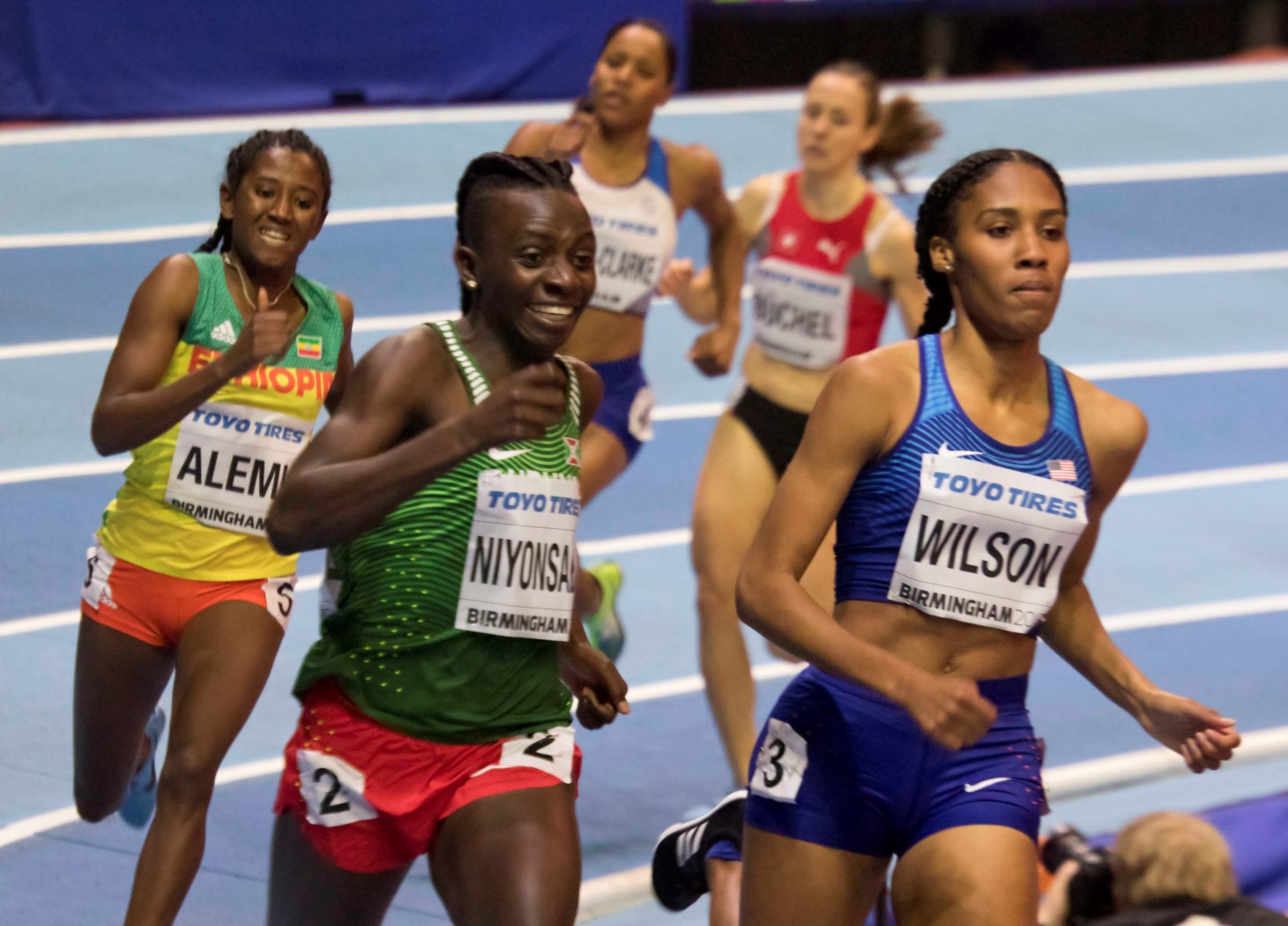
The final underway

The final was started on March 4 at 15:58.

Rank	Lane	Name	Nationality	Time	Notes
1st place, gold medalist(s)	2	Francine Niyonsaba	Burundi	1:58.31	WL
2nd place, silver medalist(s)	3	Ajeé Wilson	United States	1:58.99	PB
3rd place, bronze medalist(s)	4	Shelayna Oskan-Clarke	Great Britain	1:59.81	PB
4	5	Habitam Alemu	Ethiopia	2:01.10	
5	6	Raevyn Rogers	United States	2:01.44	
6	1	Selina Büchel	Switzerland	2:03.01	
