= Lovisa Lindh =

Swedish middle-distance runner (born 1991)

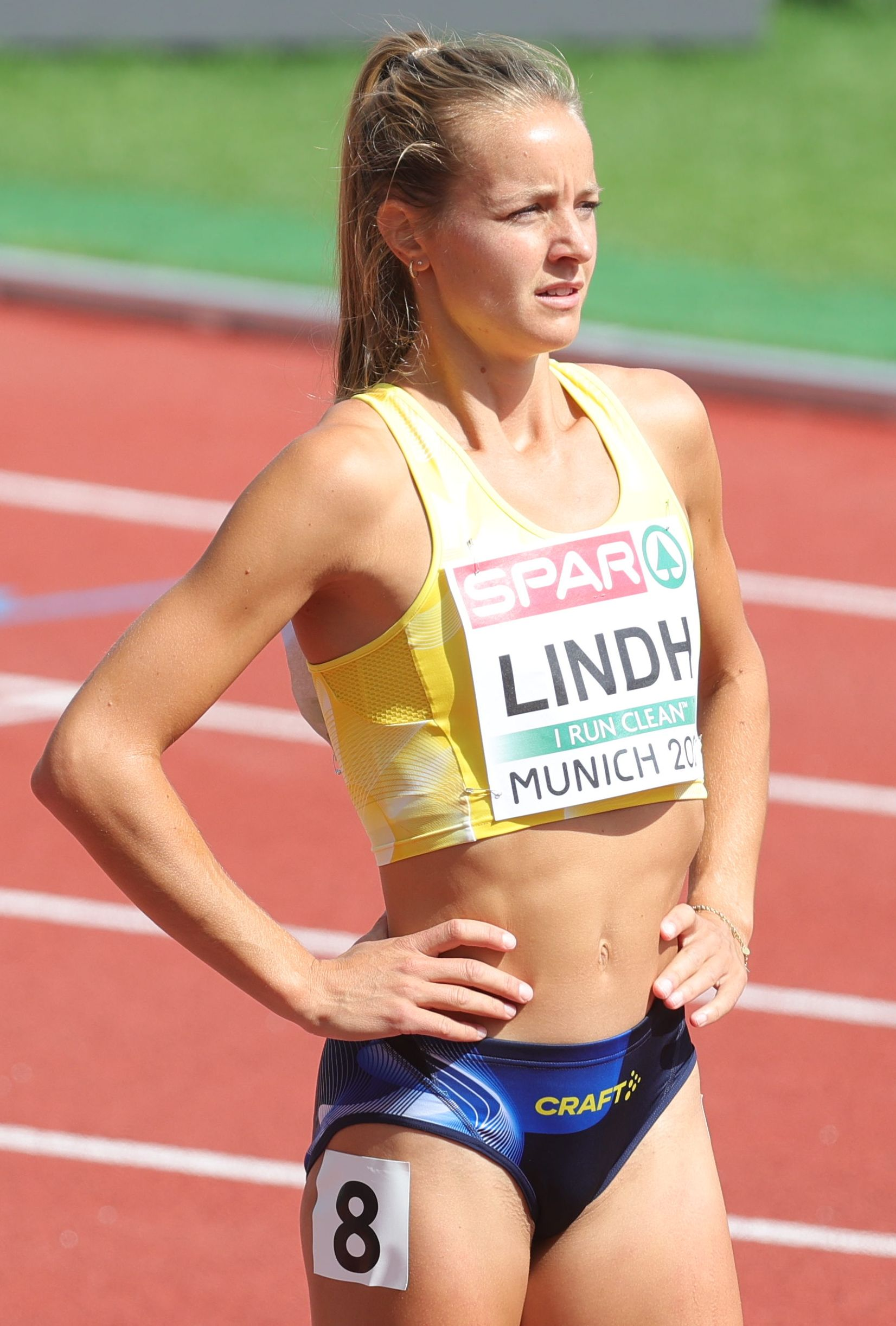
- Lovisa Lindh at the 2022 European Championships

Personal information
- Born: 9 July 1991 (age 35) Kungälv, Sweden
- Education: Southern Methodist University

Sport
- Sport: Track and field
- Event: 800 metres
- Coached by: Johan Wettegren; Richard Mattsson
Medal record
Representing Sweden
Women's athletics
European Championships
Bronze medal – third place	2016 Amsterdam	800 m

Lovisa Tora Yvonne Lindh (born 9 July 1991) is a Swedish middle-distance runner competing primarily in the 800 metres. Lindh won the bronze medal in the event at the 2016 European Championships.

== Biography ==
Competing for Ullevi FK, Lindh won the national championship title on 800 metres in 2012. She competed at the 2016 IAAF World Indoor Championships without advancing to the final. At the 2016 European Championships she won the bronze medal with a time of 2:00.37, then a personal record. At the 2016 Summer Olympics, Lindh finished ninth on the 800 metres event.

In 2021, Lindh qualified for the 2020 Summer Olympics but was not chosen to represent Sweden. In 2025, Lindh switched to Kongahälla AIK.

Lovisa Lindh is the niece of Olympic table tennis player Erik Lindh. Lindh has studied at Southern Methodist University and the Gothenburg School of Business, Economics and Law.

== Competition record ==
Year	Competition	Venue	Position	Event	Notes
Representing Sweden
2009	European Junior Championships	Novi Sad, Serbia	8th (h)	800 m	2:07.57
2010	World Junior Championships	Moncton, Canada	33rd (h)	800 m	2:10.51
2013	European U23 Championships	Tampere, Finland	7th	800 m	2:08.99
2014	European Championships	Zürich, Switzerland	12th (sf)	800 m	2:02.60
2016	World Indoor Championships	Portland, United States	8th (h)	800 m	2:03.44
2016	European Championships	Amsterdam, Netherlands	3rd	800 m	2:00.37
2016	Olympic Games	Rio de Janeiro, Brazil	9th (sf)	800 m	1:59.41
2017	European Indoor Championships	Belgrade, Serbia	4th	800 m	2:01.37
2018	European Championships	Berlin, Germany	9h	800 m	2:02.36
2019	European Indoor Championships	Glasgow, United Kingdom	12th (sf)	800 m	2:04.54
2019	World Championships	Doha, Qatar	33rd (h)	800 m	2:03.72
2021	European Indoor Championships	Toruń, Poland	11th (sf)	800 m	2:04.12
2022	European Championships	Munich, Germany	18th (h)	800 m	2:03.48

== Personal bests ==
Outdoor

- 800 metres – 1:58.77 (Lausanne 2017)
- 1000 metres – 2:35.15 National Record (Gothenburg 2017)
- 1500 metres – 4:09.03 (Florø 2017)

Indoor

- 800 metres – 2:01.37 (Belgrade 2017)
- 1500 metres – 4:26.15 (Bollnäs 2012)
