= Charline Mathias =

Luxembourgish middle-distance runner

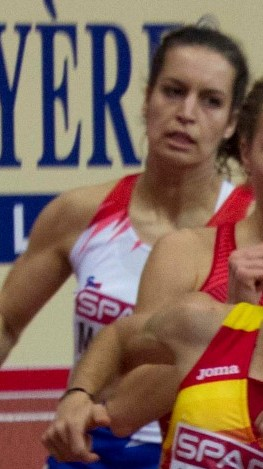
- Charline Mathias in 2017

Personal information
- Full name: Charline Kyra C. Mathias
- Born: 23 May 1992 (age 34)
- Education: Lille Catholic University

Sport
- Sport: Track and field
- Events: 800 m, 1500 m

Charline Kyra Mathias (born 23 May 1992) is a Luxembourgish middle-distance runner competing primarily in the 800 metres. She represented her country at the 2015 World Championships in Beijing without advancing from the first round.

== Career ==
She became involved in athletics at a young age and joined CAL Spora Luxembourg, then known as CSL, when she was still at school.

In June 2015, she set a national record when winning gold in the 800 metres at the inaugural European Games in Baku, Azerbaijan. She then beat her own record the following month as she ran a time of 2:01.30 in Bellinzona, Italy in July 2015. She subsequently competed at the 2015 World Championships in Beijing in the 800 metres. She competed at the 2016 Summer Olympics in Brazil.

In July 2018, she won the Luxembourg national title over 400 metres. She was selected to represent Luxembourg at the 2019 European Athletics Indoor Championships in Glasgow, Scotland, over 800 metres for her third consecutive European Indoor Championships.

In the women's 800 meters indoors in February 2022, Mathias broke her own national indoor record set in 2017, with a time of 2:03.91 at the Luxembourg Indoor Athletics Championships.

In February 2024, she set a new national indoor record for the 800 metres, running 2:01.82 to beat Vera Hoffmann into second. In June 2024, she won the outdoors Luxembourg Athletics Championships over 800 meters, in a time of 2:00.68. That month, she was selected for the 2024 European Athletics Championships in Rome.

== Competition record ==
Year	Competition	Venue	Position	Event	Notes
Representing Luxembourg
2009	Games of the Small States of Europe	Luxembourg, Luxembourg	3rd	800 m	2:13.65
2009	Games of the Small States of Europe	Luxembourg, Luxembourg	1st	4 × 400 m relay	3:49.07
2009	World Youth Championships	Brixen, Italy	16th (sf)	800 m	2:10.16
2009	European Youth Olympic Festival	Tampere, Finland	6th	800 m	2:10.87
2009	Jeux de la Francophonie	Beirut, Lebanon	6th	4 × 400 m relay	3:47.54
2010	World Junior Championships	Moncton, Canada	31st (h)	800 m	2:09.73
2013	Games of the Small States of Europe	Luxembourg, Luxembourg	2nd	400 m	54.93
2013	Games of the Small States of Europe	Luxembourg, Luxembourg	2nd	800 m	2:05.80
2013	Games of the Small States of Europe	Luxembourg, Luxembourg	2nd	4 × 400 m relay	3:44.38
2013	European U23 Championships	Tampere, Finland	17th (h)	800 m	2:07.40
2013	Jeux de la Francophonie	Nice, France	13th (h)	400 m	56.56
2013	Jeux de la Francophonie	Nice, France	5th	4 × 400 m relay	3:49.54
2014	European Championships	Zürich, Switzerland	16th (h)	800 m	2:03.43
2015	Games of the Small States of Europe	Reykjavík, Iceland	1st	800 m	2:08.61
2015	World Championships	Beijing, China	25th (h)	800 m	2:01.36
2016	Olympic Games	Rio de Janeiro, Brazil	58th (h)	800 m	2:09.30
2017	European Indoor Championships	Belgrade, Serbia	10th (sf)	800 m	2:05.93
2017	Games of the Small States of Europe	Serravalle, San Marino	1st	1500 m	4:21.59
2017	Universiade	Taipei, Taiwan	9th (sf)	800 m	2:03.59
2017	Universiade	Taipei, Taiwan	8th	1500 m	4:22.38
2018	European Championships	Berlin, Germany	8h (sf)	800 m	2:02.01
2019	European Indoor Championships	Glasgow, United Kingdom	12th (h)	800 m	2:04.73
2023	Games of the Small States of Europe	Marsa, Malta	2nd	800 m	2:12.89
2024	European Championships	Rome, Italy	12th (sf)	800 m	2:00.78

== Personal bests ==
Outdoor

- 400 metres – 54.50 (Schifflange 2014)
- 800 metres – 2:00.35 (Heusden-Zolder 2018) NR
- 1000 metres – 2:40.09 (Pliezhausen 2018) NR
- 1500 metres – 4:12.57 (Oordegem 2017) NR
- 5 kilometres – 17:03 (Trier 2017)

Indoor

- 400 metres – 55.80 (Luxembourg 2010) NR
- 800 metres – 2:04.32 (Metz 2017)
- 1500 metres – 4:15.83 (Kirchberg 2018) NR
- 3000 metres – 9:29.40 (Saarbrücken 2017) NR
