= 2013 European Athletics U23 Championships – Women's 800 metres =

The Women's 800 metres event at the 2013 European Athletics U23 Championships was held in Tampere, Finland, at Ratina Stadium on 11 and 12 July.

== Medalists ==
Gold	Mirela Lavric; Romania
Silver	Olha Lyakhova; Ukraine
Bronze	Selina Büchel; Switzerland

== Results ==
=== Final ===
12 July 2013

Rank	Name	Nationality	Lane	Time	Notes
1st place, gold medalist(s)	Mirela Lavric	Romania	7	2:01.56	SB
2nd place, silver medalist(s)	Olha Lyakhova	Ukraine	4	2:01.90	
3rd place, bronze medalist(s)	Selina Büchel	Switzerland	1	2:02.74	PB
4	Ayvika Malanova	Russia	3	2:03.28	
5	Justine Fedronic	France	5	2:04.49	
6	Anastasiya Tkachuk	Ukraine	6	2:05.22	
7	Lovisa Lindh	Sweden	2	2:08.99	
8	Joanna Jóźwik	Poland	8	2:15.22	

Intermediate times:
400m: 1:02.65 Olha Lyakhova Ukraine
600m: 1:32.17 Mirela Lavric Romania

=== Heats ===
Qualified: First 2 in each heat (Q) and 2 best performers (q) advance to the Final

==== Summary ====
Rank	Name	Nationality	Time	Notes
1	Mirela Lavric	Romania	2:02.69	Q SB
2	Joanna Jóźwik	Poland	2:02.83	Q
3	Ayvika Malanova	Russia	2:02.91	q
4	Olha Lyakhova	Ukraine	2:03.38	Q
5	Lovisa Lindh	Sweden	2:03.51	q PB
6	Anastasiya Tkachuk	Ukraine	2:03.97	Q
7	Selina Büchel	Switzerland	2:03.99	Q
8	Natalia Evangelidou	Cyprus	2:04.03	
9	Justine Fedronic	France	2:04.65	Q
10	Isabella Cornelli	Italy	2:04.97	PB
11	Sylva Škabrahová	Czech Republic	2:05.18	
12	Svetlana Rogozina	Russia	2:05.54	
13	Victoria Sauleda	Spain	2:06.09	
14	Irene Baldessari	Italy	2:06.70	PB
15	Monika Hałasa	Poland	2:06.81	
16	Adelina Elena Tanasie	Romania	2:07.28	
17	Charline Mathias	Luxembourg	2:07.40	
18	Anastasiya Bazdyreva	Russia	2:07.40	
19	Rénelle Lamote	France	2:07.63	
20	Rasa Batulevičiūtė	Lithuania	2:09.24	
21	Shanie Landen	Israel	2:09.40	
22	Katarina Smiljanec	Croatia	2:12.38	
23	Gaiane Ustian	Georgia	2:13.40	PB

==== Details ====
===== Heat 1 =====
11 July 2013 / 17:00

Rank	Name	Nationality	Lane	Time	Notes
1	Anastasiya Tkachuk	Ukraine	8	2:03.97	Q
2	Justine Fedronic	France	4	2:04.65	Q
3	Victoria Sauleda	Spain	1	2:06.09	
4	Monika Hałasa	Poland	5	2:06.81	
5	Charline Mathias	Luxembourg	2	2:07.40	
6	Anastasiya Bazdyreva	Russia	6	2:07.40	
7	Shanie Landen	Israel	3	2:09.40	
8	Katarina Smiljanec	Croatia	7	2:12.38	

Intermediate times:
400m: 1:03.27 Anastasiya Tkachuk Ukraine
600m: 1:33.79 Anastasiya Tkachuk Ukraine

===== Heat 2 =====
11 July 2013 / 17:08

Rank	Name	Nationality	Lane	Time	Notes
1	Olha Lyakhova	Ukraine	8	2:03.38	Q
2	Selina Büchel	Switzerland	6	2:03.99	Q
3	Sylva Škabrahová	Czech Republic	2	2:05.18	
4	Svetlana Rogozina	Russia	1	2:05.54	
5	Irene Baldessari	Italy	4	2:06.70	PB
6	Adelina Elena Tanasie	Romania	7	2:07.28	
7	Rénelle Lamote	France	3	2:07.63	
8	Gaiane Ustian	Georgia	5	2:13.40	PB

Intermediate times:
400m: 1:02.40 Olha Lyakhova Ukraine
600m: 1:33.21 Olha Lyakhova Ukraine

===== Heat 3 =====
11 July 2013 / 17:16

Rank	Name	Nationality	Lane	Time	Notes
1	Mirela Lavric	Romania	7	2:02.69	Q SB
2	Joanna Jóźwik	Poland	4	2:02.83	Q
3	Ayvika Malanova	Russia	2	2:02.91	q
4	Lovisa Lindh	Sweden	5	2:03.51	q PB
5	Natalia Evangelidou	Cyprus	3	2:04.03	
6	Isabella Cornelli	Italy	6	2:04.97	PB
7	Rasa Batulevičiūtė	Lithuania	8	2:09.24	

Intermediate times:
400m: 1:01.27 Ayvika Malanova Russia
600m: 1:32.37 Ayvika Malanova Russia

== Participation ==
According to an unofficial count, 23 athletes from 16 countries participated in the event.

- Croatia (1)
- Cyprus (1)
- Czech Republic (1)
- France (2)
- Georgia (1)
- Israel (1)
- Italy (2)
- Lithuania (1)
- Luxembourg (1)
- Poland (2)
- Romania (2)
- Russia (3)
- Spain (1)
- Sweden (1)
- Switzerland (1)
- Ukraine (2)
