= 2010 World Junior Championships in Athletics – Women's 800 metres =

The women's 800 metres event at the 2010 World Junior Championships in Athletics was held in Moncton, New Brunswick, Canada, at Moncton Stadium on 20, 21 and 22 July.

== Medalists ==
Gold	Elena Mirela Lavric; Romania
Silver	Cherono Koech; Kenya
Bronze	Annet Negesa; Uganda

== Results ==
=== Final ===
22 July

Rank	Name	Nationality	Time	Notes
1st place, gold medalist(s)	Elena Mirela Lavric	Romania	2:01.85	
2nd place, silver medalist(s)	Cherono Koech	Kenya	2:02.29	
3rd place, bronze medalist(s)	Annet Negesa	Uganda	2:02.51	
4	Rose Mary Almanza	Cuba	2:02.67	
5	Ajee' Wilson	United States	2:04.18	
6	Corinna Harrer	Germany	2:04.28	
7	Sarah Kelly	United Kingdom	2:04.80	
8	Yekaterina Zavyalova	Russia	2:05.56	

=== Semifinals ===
21 July

==== Semifinal 1 ====
Rank	Name	Nationality	Time	Notes
1	Annet Negesa	Uganda	2:02.27	Q
2	Elena Mirela Lavric	Romania	2:02.53	Q
3	Sarah Kelly	United Kingdom	2:02.89	q
4	Laura Roesler	United States	2:04.34	
5	Carly Paracholski	Canada	2:05.99	
6	Camilla De Bleecker	Belgium	2:06.44	
7	Anna Roche	New Zealand	2:07.01	
8	Alena Brooks	Trinidad and Tobago	2:10.10	

==== Semifinal 2 ====
Rank	Name	Nationality	Time	Notes
1	Cherono Koech	Kenya	2:04.21	Q
2	Yekaterina Zavyalova	Russia	2:04.33	Q
3	Ajee' Wilson	United States	2:04.33	q
4	Natoya Goule	Jamaica	2:05.07	
5	Joanna Jóźwik	Poland	2:05.09	
6	Selina Büchel	Switzerland	2:07.28	
7	Esma Aydemir	Turkey	2:08.79	
8	Zenitha Eriksson	Finland	2:11.99	

==== Semifinal 3 ====
Rank	Name	Nationality	Time	Notes
1	Rose Mary Almanza	Cuba	2:04.22	Q
2	Corinna Harrer	Germany	2:04.35	Q
3	Nelly Jepkosgei	Kenya	2:05.13	
4	Annie Leblanc	Canada	2:05.17	
5	Angie Smit	New Zealand	2:05.51	
6	Jessica dos Santos	Brazil	2:06.54	
7	Alawia Maki	Sudan	2:06.54	
8	Manami Mashita	Japan	2:10.54	

=== Heats ===
20 July

==== Heat 1 ====
Rank	Name	Nationality	Time	Notes
1	Joanna Jóźwik	Poland	2:07.64	Q
2	Natoya Goule	Jamaica	2:08.11	Q
3	Laura Roesler	United States	2:08.17	Q
4	Alawia Maki	Sudan	2:08.66	Q
5	Marija Stambolic	Serbia	2:09.35	
6	Darya Orekhova	Russia	2:09.51	
7	Esin Dölek	Turkey	2:11.85	
8	Halina Amialiashchyk	Belarus	2:12.76	

==== Heat 2 ====
Rank	Name	Nationality	Time	Notes
1	Angie Smit	New Zealand	2:07.13	Q
2	Selina Büchel	Switzerland	2:07.40	Q
3	Annie Leblanc	Canada	2:07.45	Q
4	Sarah Kelly	United Kingdom	2:07.72	Q
5	Esma Aydemir	Turkey	2:08.17	q
6	Ayaka Yokose	Japan	2:09.14	
7	Lovisa Lindh	Sweden	2:10.51	
8	Evangelina Thomas	Argentina	2:13.77	

==== Heat 3 ====
Rank	Name	Nationality	Time	Notes
1	Elena Mirela Lavric	Romania	2:05.90	Q
2	Ajee' Wilson	United States	2:05.94	Q
3	Yekaterina Zavyalova	Russia	2:06.14	Q
4	Carly Paracholski	Canada	2:06.70	Q
5	Nelly Jepkosgei	Kenya	2:07.36	q
6	Faithful Goremusandu	Zimbabwe	2:08.89	
7	Vendela Mindelöf	Sweden	2:09.01	
8	Stefanie Barmet	Switzerland	2:11.36	
9	Woina Wolde	Ethiopia	2:14.94	

==== Heat 4 ====
Rank	Name	Nationality	Time	Notes
1	Cherono Koech	Kenya	2:06.48	Q
2	Corinna Harrer	Germany	2:07.16	Q
3	Camilla De Bleecker	Belgium	2:07.49	Q
4	Anna Roche	New Zealand	2:07.58	Q
5	Zenitha Eriksson	Finland	2:07.64	q
6	Olga Lyakhova	Ukraine	2:09.24	
7	Saloua Bouakira	Algeria	2:10.35	
8	Alejandra Pozas	Mexico	2:12.79	

==== Heat 5 ====
Rank	Name	Nationality	Time	Notes
1	Annet Negesa	Uganda	2:04.20	Q
2	Rose Mary Almanza	Cuba	2:06.74	Q
3	Manami Mashita	Japan	2:08.47	Q
4	Jessica dos Santos	Brazil	2:08.53	Q
5	Alena Brooks	Trinidad and Tobago	2:08.82	q
6	Charline Mathias	Luxembourg	2:09.73	
7	Anuschka Nice	South Africa	2:12.94	
8	Azemra Gebru	Ethiopia	2:23.08	
9	Tatiana Guela	Central African Republic	2:34.49	

== Participation ==
According to an unofficial count, 42 athletes from 32 countries participated in the event.

- Algeria (1)
- Argentina (1)
- Belarus (1)
- Belgium (1)
- Brazil (1)
- Canada (2)
- Central African Republic (1)
- Cuba (1)
- Ethiopia (2)
- Finland (1)
- Germany (1)
- Jamaica (1)
- Japan (2)
- Kenya (2)
- Luxembourg (1)
- Mexico (1)
- New Zealand (2)
- Poland (1)
- Romania (1)
- Russia (2)
- Serbia (1)
- South Africa (1)
- Sudan (1)
- Sweden (2)
- Switzerland (2)
- Trinidad and Tobago (1)
- Turkey (2)
- Uganda (1)
- Ukraine (1)
- United Kingdom (1)
- United States (2)
- Zimbabwe (1)
