= Sanne Verstegen =

Dutch middle-distance runner

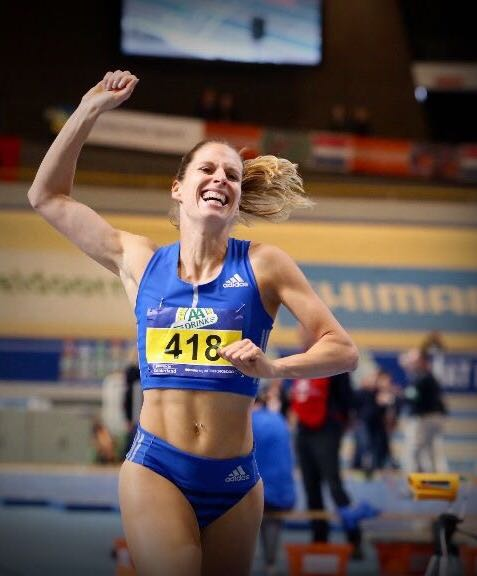
- Sanne Verstegen in 2017

Personal information
- Born: 10 November 1985 (age 39) Rotterdam, Netherlands
- Height: 1.68 m (5 ft 6 in)
- Weight: 53 kg (117 lb)

Sport
- Sport: Athletics
- Event: 800 metres
- Club: Rotterdam Atletiek
- Coached by: Peter Wolters

Sanne Verstegen (born 10 November 1985 in Rotterdam) is a Dutch middle-distance runner specialising in the 800 metres. She represented her country at the 2017 World Championships reaching the semifinals.

She is the current national record holder in the indoor 1000 metres.

== International competitions ==
| Year | Competition | Venue | Position | Event | Notes |
Representing the Netherlands
| 2014 | European Championships | Zürich, Switzerland | 14th (h) | 800 m | 2:02.73 |
| 2016 | European Championships | Amsterdam, Netherlands | 21st (sf) | 800 m | 2:03.33 |
| 2017 | European Indoor Championships | Belgrade, Serbia | 4th (sf) | 800 m | 2:03.06 |
| 2017 | World Championships | London, United Kingdom | 15th (sf) | 800 m | 2:00.92 |
| 2018 | European Championships | Berlin, Germany | 18h (h) | 800 m | 2:02.72 |

== Personal bests ==
Outdoor

- 400 metres – 53.54 (Amsterdam 2010)
- 600 metres – 1:28.06 (Potchefstroom 2016)
- 800 metres – 1:59.55 (Madrid 2017)
- 1000 metres – 2:37.49 (Rabat 2018)
- 1500 metres – 4:07.90 (Hengelo 20167)

Indoor

- 400 metres – 53.98 (Vienna 2010)
- 600 metres – 1:30.27 (Albuquerque 2015)
- 800 metres – 2:01.83 (Apeldoorn 2017)
- 1000 metres – 2:38.72 (Birmingham 2017) NR
- 1500 metres – 4:19.44 (Dortmund 2015)
