= 2019 World Athletics Championships – Women's 800 metres =

Women's 800 metres at the 2019 World Championships
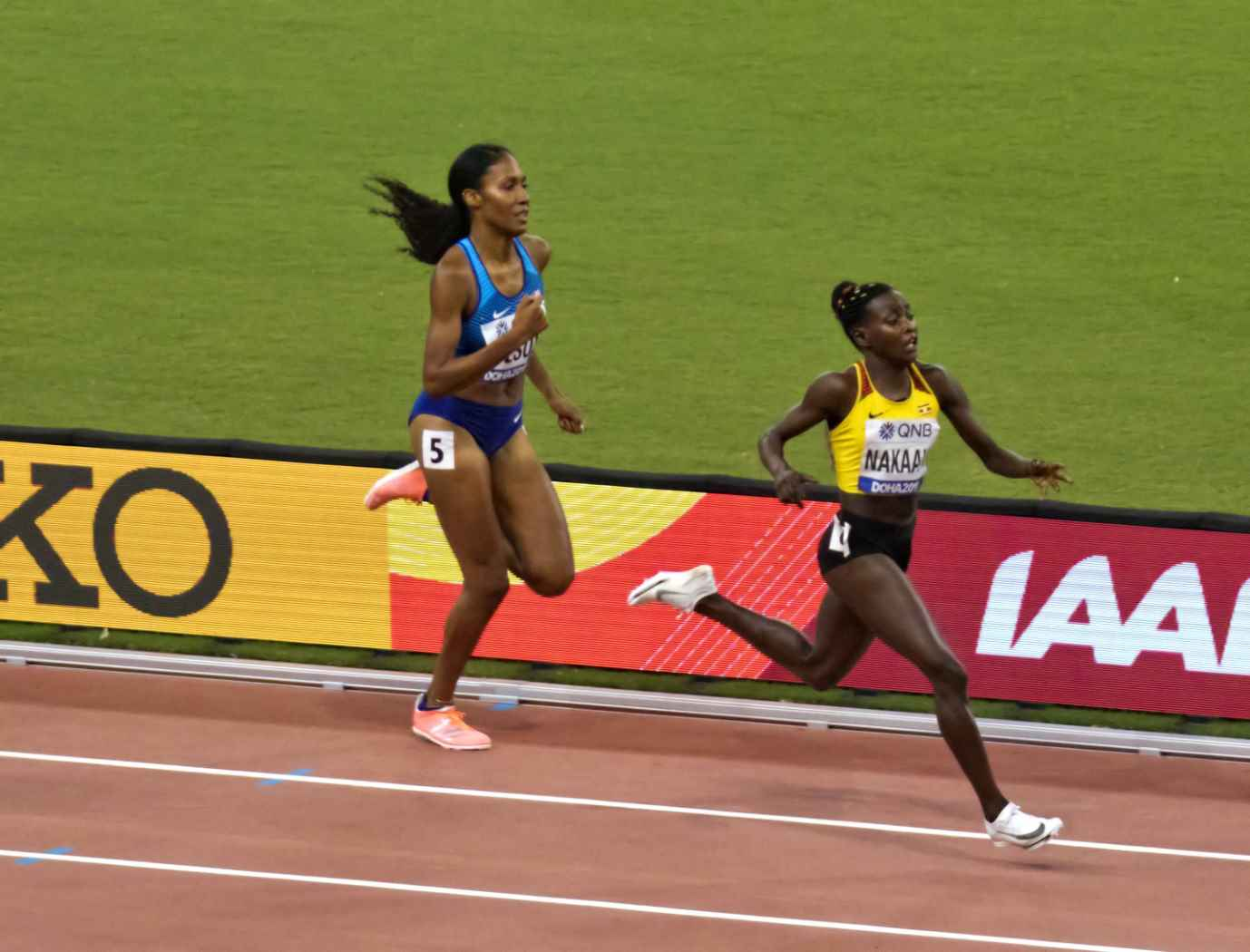
- 800m women final nakaayi
- Venue: Khalifa International Stadium
- Dates: 27 September (heats); 28 September (semi-finals); 30 September (final)
- Competitors: 41 from 28 nations
- Winning time: 1:58.04

Medalists
gold medal	Halimah Nakaayi	Uganda
silver medal	Raevyn Rogers	United States
bronze medal	Ajeé Wilson	United States

Video on YouTube Official Video

The women's 800 metres at the 2019 World Athletics Championships was held at the Khalifa International Stadium in Doha, Qatar, from 27 to 30 September 2019.

== Summary ==
The new IAAF testosterone rule was essentially aimed at this event. The defending champion, silver medalist and 4th place from 2017, the same athletes as the Olympic podium from 2016, were denied entry into this race.

From the gun in the final, Ajeé Wilson ran with purpose to take the lead at the break and control the race. Natoya Goule and Raevyn Rogers fell in line behind her. Around the second turn, Halimah Nakaayi ran around Rogers who slowed to become a blocking force in the pack, dropping back as far as next to last just after the bell. Winnie Nanyondo led the charge to bridge the new gap behind the three leaders. Down the backstretch, Goule started to challenge Wilson. Wilson ran hard to hold her off. Instead Goule was passed by the two Ugandans, Nakaayi on the inside and Nanyondo on the outside. Through the final turn Nakaayi worked her way up to Wilson's shoulder, shadowed by Nayondo. The diminutive Nakaayi executed the classic pass off the turn. Wilson had no answer. Nayondo was not gaining, but from seventh place at the head of the home stretch, Rogers was sprinting down lane 4, passing Nayondo, passing Wilson and getting to within a metre of Nakaayi before the finish.

== Records ==
Before the competition records were as follows:

Record	Perf.	Athlete	Nat.	Date	Location
World	1:53.28	Jarmila Kratochvílová	TCH	26 Jul 1983	Munich, West Germany
Championship	1:54.68	Jarmila Kratochvílová	TCH	9 Aug 1983	Helsinki, Finland
World leading	1:54.98	Caster Semenya	RSA	3 May 2019	Doha, Qatar
African	1:54.01	Pamela Jelimo	KEN	29 Aug 2008	Zürich, Switzerland
Asian	1:55.54	Liu Dong	CHN	9 Sep 1993	Beijing, China
NACAC	1:54.44	Ana Fidelia Quirot	CUB	9 Sep 1989	Barcelona, Spain
South American	1:56.68	Letitia Vriesde	SUR	13 Aug 1995	Gothenburg, Sweden
European	1:53.28	Jarmila Kratochvílová	TCH	26 Jul 1983	Munich, West Germany
Oceanian	1:58.25	Toni Hodgkinson	NZL	7 Jul 1996	Atlanta, United States

The following records were set at the competition:

Record	Perf.	Athlete	Nat.	Date
Ugandan	1:58.04	Halimah Nakaayi	UGA	30 Sep 2019

== Schedule ==
The event schedule, in local time (UTC+3), was as follows:

Date	Time	Round
27 September	17:10	Heats
28 September	19:15	Semi-finals
30 September	22:10	Final

== Results ==
=== Heats ===
Qualification: First 3 in each heat (Q) and the next 6 fastest (q) advanced to the semi-finals.

Rank	Heat	Name	Nationality	Time	Notes
1	3	Winnie Nanyondo	Uganda	2:00.36	Q
2	4	Natoya Goule	Jamaica	2:01.01	Q
3	4	Ce'Aira Brown	United States	2:01.14	Q
4	4	Noélie Yarigo	Benin	2:01.19	Q
5	3	Katharina Trost	Germany	2:01.45	Q
6	4	Olha Lyakhova	Ukraine	2:01.47	q
7	3	Halima Hachlaf	Morocco	2:01.50	Q
8	3	Lindsey Butterworth	Canada	2:01.64	q
9	2	Raevyn Rogers	United States	2:02.01	Q
10	2	Shelayna Oskan-Clarke	Great Britain & N.I.	2:02.09	Q
11	1	Ajeé Wilson	United States	2:02.10	Q
12	2	Morgan Mitchell	Australia	2:02.13	Q
13	2	Eunice Jepkoech Sum	Kenya	2:02.17	q
14	1	Halimah Nakaayi	Uganda	2:02.33	Q
15	2	Anna Sabat	Poland	2:02.43	q
16	1	Hedda Hynne	Norway	2:02.49	Q
17	4	Diribe Welteji	Ethiopia	2:02.71	q
18	3	Līga Velvere	Latvia	2:02.93	q
19	1	Christina Hering	Germany	2:03.15	
20	1	Sara Kuivisto	Finland	2:03.15	
21	5	Nataliya Pryshchepa	Ukraine	2:03.22	Q
22	5	Wang Chunyu	China	2:03.25	Q
23	5	Alexandra Bell	Great Britain & N.I.	2:03.34	Q
24	6	Rénelle Lamote	France	2:03.36	Q
25	2	Selina Büchel	Switzerland	2:03.38	
26	5	Lore Hoffmann	Switzerland	2:03.40	
27	5	Malika Akkaoui	Morocco	2:03.40	
28	6	Rose Mary Almanza	Cuba	2:03.42	Q
29	6	Rababe Arafi	Morocco	2:03.44	Q
30	4	Diana Mezuliáníková	Czech Republic	2:03.48	
31	6	Lynsey Sharp	Great Britain & N.I.	2:03.57	
32	1	Renée Eykens	Belgium	2:03.65	
33	5	Lovisa Lindh	Sweden	2:03.72	
34	4	Déborah Rodríguez	Uruguay	2:03.80	
35	5	Hanna Green	United States	2:04.37	
36	1	Gabriela Gajanová	Slovakia	2:04.45	
37	6	Carley Thomas	Australia	2:04.65	
38	6	Eleonora Vandi	Italy	2:04.98	
39	3	Catriona Bisset	Australia	2:05.33	
40	2	Rose Lokonyen	Athlete Refugee Team	2:13.39	PB
	6	Tsepang Sello	Lesotho	DQ	163.5

=== Semi-finals ===
Video on YouTube Official Video

The first 2 in each heat (Q) and the next two fastest (q) qualified for the final.

Rank	Heat	Name	Nationality	Time	Notes
1	3	Halimah Nakaayi	Uganda	1:59.35	Q, SB
2	1	Raevyn Rogers	United States	1:59.57	Q
3	1	Winnie Nanyondo	Uganda	1:59.75	Q
4	3	Eunice Jepkoech Sum	Kenya	2:00.10	Q
5	3	Ce'Aira Brown	United States	2:00.12	q
6	2	Ajeé Wilson	United States	2:00.31	Q
7	3	Natoya Goule	Jamaica	2:00.33	q
8	1	Olha Lyakhova	Ukraine	2:00.72	
9	1	Lindsey Butterworth	Canada	2:00.74	
10	3	Noélie Yarigo	Benin	2:00.75	
11	2	Rababe Arafi	Morocco	2:00.80	Q
12	2	Hedda Hynne	Norway	2:01.03	
13	2	Rose Mary Almanza	Cuba	2:01.18	
14	1	Alexandra Bell	Great Britain & N.I.	2:01.23	
15	2	Nataliya Pryshchepa	Ukraine	2:01.24	
16	1	Halima Hachlaf	Morocco	2:01.30	
17	1	Katharina Trost	Germany	2:01.77	
18	2	Diribe Welteji	Ethiopia	2:02.69	
19	2	Wang Chunyu	China	2:02.84	
20	3	Rénelle Lamote	France	2:02.86	
21	3	Anna Sabat	Poland	2:04.00	
22	3	Morgan Mitchell	Australia	2:04.76	
23	1	Līga Velvere	Latvia	2:06.99	
24	2	Shelayna Oskan-Clarke	Great Britain & N.I.	2:10.89	

=== Final ===
The final was started on 30 September at 22:10.

Rank	Lane	Name	Nationality	Time	Notes
1st place, gold medalist(s)	8	Halimah Nakaayi	Uganda	1:58.04	NR
2nd place, silver medalist(s)	4	Raevyn Rogers	United States	1:58.18	SB
3rd place, bronze medalist(s)	5	Ajeé Wilson	United States	1:58.84	
4	7	Winnie Nanyondo	Uganda	1:59.18	
5	9	Eunice Jepkoech Sum	Kenya	1:59.71	
6	6	Natoya Goule	Jamaica	2:00.11	
7	3	Rababe Arafi	Morocco	2:00.48	
8	2	Ce'Aira Brown	United States	2:02.97	
