= Lindsey Butterworth =

Canadian middle-distance runner

Personal information
- Nationality: Canadian
- Born: 27 September 1992 (age 33) Burnaby, British Columbia, Canada

Sport
- Sport: Middle-distance running
- Event: 800 metres

Lindsey Butterworth (born 27 September 1992) is a Canadian middle-distance runner. She competed in the women's 800 metres at the 2017 World Championships in Athletics. She also competed at the 2019 World Championships in Athletics, reaching the semi-final in the women's 800 metres. Named to the Canadian team for the 2020 Summer Olympics in Tokyo, Butterworth was fifth in her heat of the 800 metres and did not advance to the semi-finals.

== Results and personal bests ==
All Results taken from World Athletics Profile

=== Championship results ===
Year	Meet	Venue	Event	Place	Time
2011	NAIA Indoor Championships	Geneva, USA	1000m	3rd	2:54.17
2011	NAIA Championships	Marion, USA	1500m	4th	4:31.46
2011	Canadian Junior Championships	Winnipeg, Canada	1500m	1st	4:31.59
2011	Pan American Junior Athletics Championships	Ansin Sports Complex	1500m	2nd	4:36.91
2012	Canadian Track and Field Championships	Calgary, Alberta	1500m	21st	4:52.32
2013	NCAA Div II Indoor Championships	Birmingham, USA	800m	8th	2:20.18
2013	NCAA Div II Championships	Pueblo, USA	800m	4th	2:10.03
2014	Canadian Track and Field Championships	Moncton Stadium	800m	H2 7th	2:12.19
2015	NCAA Div II Indoor Championships	Birmingham, USA	800m	1st	2:08.44
2015	NCAA Div II Championships	Allendale, USA	800m	1st	2:02.88
2015	Summer Universiade	Gwangju, South Korea	800m	7th	2:03.96
2016	Canadian Track and Field Championships	Edmonton, Canada	800m	5th	2:04.55
2017	Canadian Track and Field Championships	Terry Fox Stadium	800m	3rd	2:04.34
2017	World Athletics Championships	Olympic Stadium	800m	H4 8th	2:03.19
2018	Canadian Track and Field Championships	Terry Fox Stadium	800m	1st	2:00.87
2018	NACAC Championships	Varsity Stadium	800m	5th	2:00.81
2019	Canadian Track and Field Championships	Montreal, Canada	800m	4th	2:02.64
2019	Pan American Games	Lima, Peru	800m	5th	2:02.68
2019	World Athletics Championships	Khalifa International Stadium	800m	SF1 4th	2:00.74
2021	Canadian Track and Field Championships	Complexe Sportif Claude-Robillard	800m	1st	1:59.19
2021	Olympic Games	National Stadium	800m	H4 5th	2:02.45
2022	World Athletics Indoor Championships	Štark Arena	800m	6th	2:03.21
2022	Canadian Track and Field Championships	Langley, Canada	800m	2nd	2:00.85
2022	World Athletics Championships	Hayward Field	800m	SF1 7th	2:01.39
2022	Commonwealth Games	Alexander Stadium	800m	7th	2:00.79

=== Personal records ===
Surface	Event	Time	Date	Venue
Indoor track	800m	2:01.45	February 27, 2022	Boston University
Indoor track	1000m	2:37.85	February 14, 2020	Boston University
Indoor track	1500m	4:14.82	January 25, 2020	Reggie Lewis Center
Indoor track	One Mile	4:34.40	January 28, 2022	Boston University
Outdoor track	800m	1:59.19	June 25, 2021	Complexe Sportif Claude-Robillard
Outdoor track	1000m	2:37.26	September 4, 2020	Brusseles, Belgium
Outdoor track	1500m	4:08.25	June 14, 2022	Burnaby, Canada
Outdoor track	One Mile	4:40.00	May 28, 2017	Richmond, Canada
