= Hedda Hynne =

Norwegian middle-distance runner

Hedda Hynne OLY
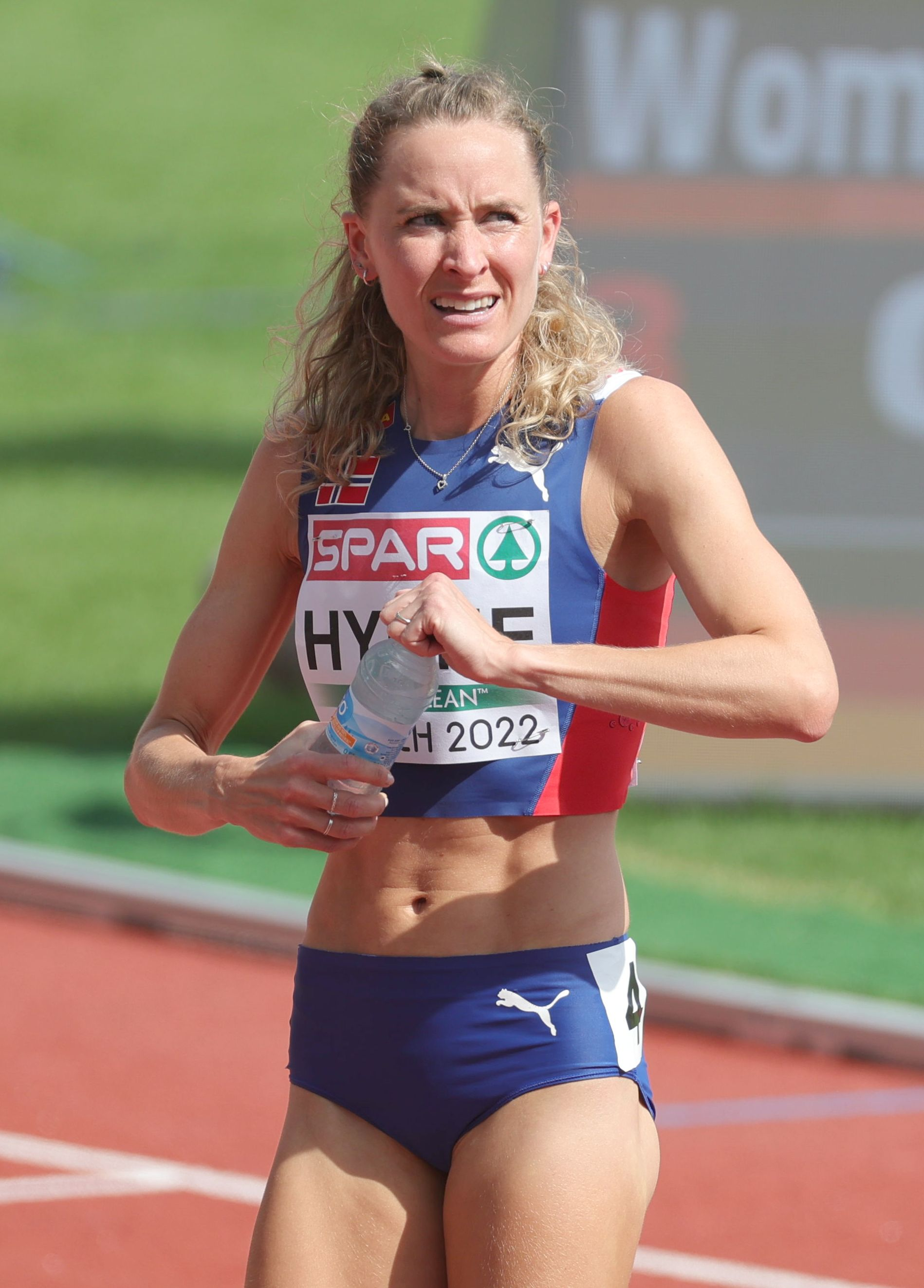
- Hedda Hynne in 2022

Personal information
- Born: 13 March 1990 (age 36) Skien, Norway

Sport
- Sport: Track and field
- Event: 800 metres
- Club: Strindheim IL

Hedda Hynne (born 13 March 1990) is a Norwegian middle-distance runner competing primarily in the 800 metres. She competed at the 2016 IAAF World Indoor Championships. Her personal bests in the event are 1:58:10 outdoors (Bellinzona 2020) and 2:01.55 indoors (Reykjavik 2017). Both are current national records.

== Competition record ==
Year	Competition	Venue	Position	Event	Notes
Representing Norway
2014	European Championships	Zürich, Switzerland	22nd (h)	800 m	2:05.08
2016	World Indoor Championships	Portland, United States	9th (h)	800 m	2:03.96
2016	European Championships	Amsterdam, Netherlands	7th	800 m	2:00.94
2016	Olympic Games	Rio de Janeiro, Brazil	38th (h)	800 m	2:01.64
2017	European Indoor Championships	Belgrade, Serbia	11th (h)	800 m	2:04.88
2017	World Championships	London, United Kingdom	10th (sf)	800 m	1:59.38
2019	European Indoor Championships	Glasgow, United Kingdom	16th (h)	800 m	2:05.73
2019	World Championships	Doha, Qatar	12th (sf)	800 m	2:01.03
2021	European Indoor Championships	Toruń, Poland	27th (h)	800 m	2:06.46
2021	Olympic Games	Tokyo, Japan	23rd (sf)	800 m	2:02.38
2022	World Indoor Championships	Belgrade, Serbia	16th (h)	800 m	2:04.17
2022	World Championships	Eugene, United States	44th (h)	800 m	2:06.27
2022	European Championships	Munich, Germany	19th (h)	800 m	2:03.64
2023	European Indoor Championships	Istanbul, Turkey	9th (h)	800 m	2:03.34
2023	World Championships	Budapest, Hungary	33rd (h)	800 m	2:01.00
