= Alexandra Štuková =

Slovak middle-distance runner

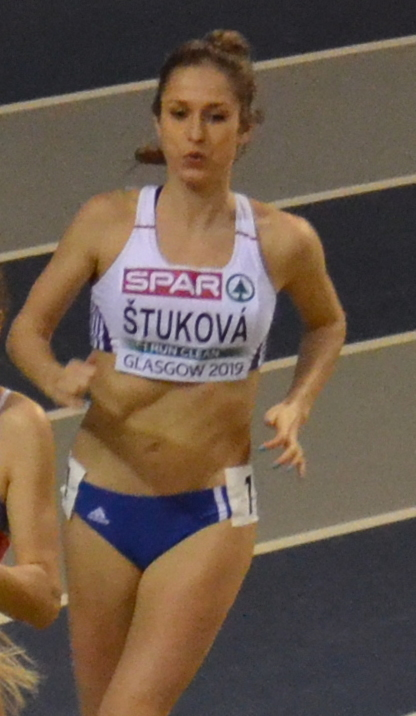
- Alexandra Štuková in 2019

Personal information
- Born: 2 July 1990 (age 35)

Sport
- Country: Slovakia
- Sport: Track and field
- Event: 800 metres
Medal record
Women's athletics
Representing Slovakia
European Games
Gold medal – first place	2015 Baku	Mixed team
World Youth Championships
Bronze medal – third place	2007 Ostrava	400 m
European Youth Summer Olympic Festival
Gold medal – first place	2007 Belgrade	400 m

Alexandra Štuková (born 2 July 1990) is a Slovak middle-distance runner. She competed in the 800 metres at the 2016 European Athletics Championships.
