= Norway at the 2026 European Athletics Championships =

- WA code: NOR
- National federation: Norwegian Athletics Association
- Website: www.friidrett.no

in Birmingham, United Kingdom
- Competitors: 55 (26 men and 29 women)
- Medals Ranked 5th: Gold 4 Silver 0 Bronze 2 Total 6

European Athletics Championships appearances
- 1934; 1938; 1946; 1950; 1954; 1958; 1962; 1966; 1969; 1971; 1974; 1978; 1982; 1986; 1990; 1994; 1998; 2002; 2006; 2010; 2012; 2014; 2016; 2018; 2022; 2024; 2026

Norway competed at the 2026 European Athletics Championships in Birmingham, United Kingdom, between 10 and 16 August 2026. A delegation of 55 athletes (49 individual athletes and 6 relay-only competitors) is sent to represent the country.

== Medals ==
Medal	Name	Event	Date
Gold	Jakob Ingebrigtsen	Men's 5000 metres	10 August
Gold	Karsten Warholm; Amalie Iuel; Andreas Ofstad Kulseng; Henriette Jæger	Mixed 4 × 400 metres relay	10 August
Gold	Karsten Warholm	Men's 400 metres hurdles	14 August
Gold	Henriette Jæger	Women's 400 metres	15 August
Bronze	Beatrice Nedberge Llano	Women's hammer throw	12 August
Bronze	Sander Skotheim	Men's decathlon	13 August

== Results ==
The following athletes are selected to compete by the Norwegian Athletics Association.

- including alternates

Key

- Note–Ranks given for track events are within the athlete's heat only
- Q = Qualified by place in Track Events or by standard in Field Events
- q = Qualified by time in Track Events or without standard in Field Events
- qR= Advanced to the next round by referee.
- NR = National record
- CHB = Championship best
- WL = World Leading
- PB = Personal best
- SB = Season's best
- — = Round not applicable for the event
- Bye = Athlete not required to compete in round
- DNF = Did Not Finish (Running or Race Walking Events)
- DNS = Did not start
- DQ = Disqualified
- NM = No Mark (No valid trial recorded in Field Events

=== Men ===
Track and road events

Athlete	Event	Heat		Semifinal		Final	
Athlete	Event	Result	Rank	Result	Rank	Result	Rank
Per Tinius Fremstad-Waldron	100 m	10.50	6 q	10.47	6	Did not advance	
Kenny Emi Tijani-Ajayi	200 m	20.70 PB	4 q	20.74	7	Did not advance	
Andreas Ofstad Kulseng	200 m	21.05	15	Did not advance			
Håvard Bentdal Ingvaldsen	400 m	46.16	16	Did not advance			
Tobias Grønstad	800 m	1:45.85	5 q	1:45.26	4	Did not advance	
Andreas Fjeld Halvorsen	1500 m	3:51.70	16	—N/a		Did not advance	
Narve Gilje Nordås	1500 m	3:36.17	5 Q	—N/a		3:37.31	7
Andreas Fjeld Halvorsen	5000 m	—N/a				14:00.73	21
Filip Ingebrigtsen	5000 m	—N/a				DNF	
Jakob Ingebrigtsen	5000 m	—N/a				13:15.29 SB	1st place, gold medalist(s)
Magnus Tuv Myhre	5000 m	—N/a				13:16.59 SB	5
Magnus Tuv Myhre	10,000 m	—N/a				28:21.25 SB	6
Erik Lomås	Marathon	—N/a				2:33:33	52
Eivind Øygard	Marathon	—N/a				2:20:40 SB	42
Sjur Prestsæter	Marathon	—N/a				2:17:02	30
Erik Lomås; Eivind Øygard; Sjur Prestsæter	Marathon team	—N/a				7:11:15	10
Karsten Warholm	400 m hurdles	Bye		48.01	1 Q	46.63 CR	1st place, gold medalist(s)
Jacob Boutera	3000 m steeplechase	8:49.44 SB	12	—N/a		Did not advance	
Per Tinius Fremstad-Waldron; Jørgen Homstad; Mathias Hove Johansen; Salum Ageze Kashafal	4 × 100 m relay	39.79	7	—N/a		Did not advance	

Field events

Athlete	Event	Qualification		Final	
Athlete	Event	Distance	Position	Distance	Position
Erlend Bolstad Raa	High jump	2.15	19	Did not advance	
Sondre Guttormsen	Pole vault	5.60	6 q	5.70	6
Henrik Flåtnes	Long jump	7.63	19	Did not advance	
Ola Stunes Isene	Discus throw	56.63	23	Did not advance	
Eivind Prestegård Henriksen	Hammer throw	72.06	19	Did not advance	
Thomas Mardal	Hammer throw	73.23	16	Did not advance	

Combined events – Decathlon

Athlete	Event	100 m	LJ	SP	HJ	400 m	110H	DT	PV	JT	1500 m	Final	Rank
Sander Skotheim	Result	10.95	7.80 SB	14.45 SB	2.05	48.31 SB	14.50 SB	43.23	5.00 =SB	59.43 SB	4:25.99 SB	8433 SB	3rd place, bronze medalist(s)
Sander Skotheim	Points	872	1010	756	850	894	911	730	910	729	771	8433 SB	3rd place, bronze medalist(s)

=== Women ===
Track and road events

Athlete	Event	Heat		Semifinal		Final	
Athlete	Event	Result	Rank	Result	Rank	Result	Rank
Maren Bakke Amundsen	200 m	23.50	16	Did not advance			
Josefine Tomine Eriksen Aks	400 m	50.83 PB	1 q	51.61	6	Did not advance	
Astri Ayo Lakeri Ertzgaard	400 m	52.71	17	Did not advance			
Henriette Jæger	400 m	Bye		49.80	1 Q	49.04 EL NR	1st place, gold medalist(s)
Pernille Karlsen Antonsen	800 m	1:59.73	4	Did not advance			
Amanda Marie Grefstad Frøynes	800 m	1:59.09 PB	7	Did not advance			
Marte Hovland	1500 m	4:14.32	12	—N/a		Did not advance	
Anne Gine Løvnes	1500 m	4:11.38	10	—N/a		Did not advance	
Ingeborg Østgård	1500 m	4:18.81	14	—N/a		Did not advance	
Anne Marie Nordengen Sirevåg	5000 m	—N/a				15:55.26	15
Madelene Wanvik Holum	5000 m	—N/a				16:01.44	20
Hanne Mjøen Maridal	10,000 m	—N/a				32:32.12	15
Anne Marie Nordengen Sirevåg	10,000 m	—N/a				32:41.21	17
Elea Jørstad Bock	100 m hurdles	12.98	10 q	13.10	5	Did not advance	
Martine Kolbeinshavn Hjørnevik	100 m hurdles	12.82	3 q	12.97	4	Did not advance	
Lovise Skarbøvik Andresen	100 m hurdles	DNF		Did not advance			
Amalie Iuel	400 m hurdles	Bye		54.22	3 q	54.70	7
Andrea Rooth	400 m hurdles	56.57	15	Did not advance			
Elisabeth Slettum	400 m hurdles	56.83	20	Did not advance			
Andrea Nygård Vie	3000 m steeplechase	9:55.79	13	—N/a		Did not advance	
Vilde Våge Henriksen	3000 m steeplechase	9:49.45	11	—N/a		Did not advance	
Josefine Tomine Eriksen Aks; Astri Ayo Lakeri Ertzgaard; Kaitesi Ertzgaard; Amalie Iuel	4 × 400 m relay	3:27.71	4	—N/a		Did not advance	

Field events

Athlete	Event	Qualification		Final	
Athlete	Event	Distance	Position	Distance	Position
Lene Onsrud Retzius	Pole vault	4.25	16	Did not advance	
Kitty Augusta Friele Faye	Pole vault	NM		Did not advance	
Beatrice Nedberge Llano	Hammer throw	72.09	2 Q	72.88	3rd place, bronze medalist(s)
Sigrid Borge	Javelin throw	57.22	11 q	59.98	4
Marie-Therese Obst	Javelin throw	NM		Did not advance	
Kaja Mørch Pettersen	Javelin throw	54.50	20	Did not advance	

=== Mixed ===
Track and road events

Athlete	Event	Final	
Athlete	Event	Result	Rank
Karsten Warholm; Amalie Iuel; Andreas Ofstad Kulseng; Henriette Jæger	Mixed 4 × 400 m	3:09.62 CR EL NR	1st place, gold medalist(s)
