= Norway at the 2018 European Athletics Championships =

- WA code: NOR
- National federation: NFIF
- Website: www.friidrett.no

in Berlin
- Competitors: 33
- Medals: Gold 3 Silver 1 Bronze 1 Total 5

European Athletics Championships appearances
- 1934; 1938; 1946; 1950; 1954; 1958; 1962; 1966; 1969; 1971; 1974; 1978; 1982; 1986; 1990; 1994; 1998; 2002; 2006; 2010; 2012; 2014; 2016; 2018; 2022; 2024; 2026

Norway competed at the 2018 European Athletics Championships in Berlin, Germany, from 6–12 August 2018. A delegation of 33 athletes were sent to represent the country.

== Results ==
Men
Track and road

Athletes	Event	Heats		Semifinal		Final	
Athletes	Event	Result	Rank	Result	Rank	Result	Rank
Jonathan Quarcoo	100 metres	10.37	9 Q	10.45	22	did not advance	
Jonathan Quarcoo	200 metres	20.77	11 q	21.07	22	did not advance	
Karsten Warholm	400 metres	—N/a		44.91 SB	3 Q	46.68	8
Markus Einan	800 metres	1:48.55	25	did not advance			
Thomas Roth	800 metres	1:46.70	7 q	1:46.60	9	did not advance	
Ferdinand Kvan Edman	1500 metres	3:50.26	26	—N/a		did not advance	
Filip Ingebrigtsen	1500 metres	3:40.88	6 Q	—N/a		3:41.66	12
Henrik Ingebrigtsen	1500 metres	3:49.54	22 Q	—N/a		3:38.50	4
Jakob Ingebrigtsen	1500 metres	3:40.81	4 Q	—N/a		3:38.10	1st place, gold medalist(s)
Henrik Ingebrigtsen	5000 metres	—N/a				13:18.75	2nd place, silver medalist(s)
Jakob Ingebrigtsen	5000 metres	—N/a				13:17.06 EU20R	1st place, gold medalist(s)
Marius Øyre Vedvik	10,000 metres	—N/a				30:46.59	27
Weldu Negash Gebretsadik	Marathon	—N/a				did not finish	
Sondre Nordstad Moen	Marathon	—N/a				did not finish	
Vladimir Vukićević	110 metres hurdles	13.67	8 q	13.71	22	did not advance	
Karsten Warholm	400 metres hurdles	—N/a		48.67	1 Q	47.64 EU23R	1st place, gold medalist(s)
Tom Erling Kårbø	3000 metres steeplechase	8:29.90	13 q	—N/a		8:42.91	11
Håvard Haukenes	50 km walk	—N/a				3:48:35	4

Field events

Athletes	Event	Qualification		Final	
Athletes	Event	Distance	Position	Distance	Position
Eirik Greibrokk Dolve	Pole vault	5.36	17	did not advance	
Sondre Guttormsen	Pole vault	5.61 PB	1 q	5.75 NR	6
Marcus Thomsen	Shot put	19.59	16	did not advance	
Ola Stunes Isene	Discus throw	62.19	12 q	59.56	11
Eivind Henriksen	Hammer throw	75.14	6 q	76.86 NR	5

Combined events – Decathlon

Athlete	Event	100 m	LJ	SP	HJ	400 m	110H	DT	PV	JT	1500 m	Final	Rank
Martin Roe	Result	10.86	7.61 PB	15.48 SB	1.96 =PB	49.42 SB	15.31	42.22	4.80 =PB	64.53	4:41.40	8131	6
Martin Roe	Points	892	962	819	767	842	812	710	849	806	672	8131	6

Women
Track and road

Athletes	Event	Heats		Semifinal		Final	
Athletes	Event	Result	Rank	Result	Rank	Result	Rank
Ezinne Okparaebo	100 metres	11.44	4 Q	11.37	16	did not advance	
Helene Rønningen	100 metres	11.70	20	did not advance			
Ezinne Okparaebo	200 metres	23.84	17	did not advance			
Helene Rønningen	200 metres	23.96	21	did not advance			
Yngvild Elvemo	800 metres	2:05.79	30	did not advance			
Hedda Hynne	800 metres	did not start		did not advance			
Isabelle Pedersen	100 metres hurdles	—N/a		13.04	14	did not advance	
Amalie Hammild Iuel	400 metres hurdles	—N/a		55.81	11	did not advance	
Line Kloster	400 metres hurdles	—N/a		55.78	10	did not advance	
Elisabeth Slettum	400 metres hurdles	58.56	20	did not advance			
Karoline Bjerkeli Grøvdal	3000 metres steeplechase	9:34.23	6 Q	—N/a		9:24.46	3rd place, bronze medalist(s)

Field events

Athletes	Event	Qualification		Final	
Athletes	Event	Distance	Position	Distance	Position
Tonje Angelsen	High jump	1.81	24	did not advance	
Lene Retzius	Pole vault	4.20	22	did not advance	
Sigrid Borge	Javelin throw	59.55	10 q	59.60	8
