= Norway at the 2024 European Athletics Championships =

- Flag of Norway
- WA code: NOR
- National federation: Royal Dutch Athletics Federation

in Rome, Italy 7 June 2024 – 12 June 2022
- Competitors: 51 (30 men and 21 women)
- Medals Ranked 4th: Gold 4 Silver 2 Bronze 1 Total 7

European Athletics Championships appearances
- 1934; 1938; 1946; 1950; 1954; 1958; 1962; 1966; 1969; 1971; 1974; 1978; 1982; 1986; 1990; 1994; 1998; 2002; 2006; 2010; 2012; 2014; 2016; 2018; 2022; 2024

Athletes from the Norway competed at the 2024 European Athletics Championships in the Stadio Olimpico in Rome, Italy from 7 to 12 June 2024.

== Medallists ==
Medal	Name	Event	Date
Gold	Jakob Ingebrigtsen	Men's 5000 metres	8 June
Gold	Karoline Bjerkeli Grøvdal	Women's half marathon	9 June
Gold	Karsten Warholm	Men's 400 metres hurdles	11 June
Gold	Jakob Ingebrigtsen	Men's 1500 metres	12 June
Silver	Karoline Bjerkeli Grøvdal	Women's 5000 metres	7 June
Silver	Sander Skotheim	Men's decathlon	11 June
Bronze	Marie-Therese Obst	Women's javelin throw	11 June

== Results ==
Norway entered the following athletes.

Key

- Q = Qualified for the next round
- q = Qualified for the next round as a fastest loser or, in field events, by position without achieving the qualifying target
- DNS = Did not start
- DNF = Did not finish
- — = Round not applicable for the event
- CR = Championship record
- EM35R = European masters over-35 record
- PB = Personal best
- WL = World leading result
- EL = European leading result
- EU23L = European under-23 leading result
- SB = Season best

=== Men ===
Track and road events

Athlete	Event	Heat		Semifinal		Final	
Athlete	Event	Result	Rank	Result	Rank	Result	Rank
Mathias Hove Johansen	200 metres	21.21	21	Did not advance			
Andreas Grimerud	400 metres	45.90 =PB	13 q	46.25	23	Did not advance	
Håvard Bentdal Ingvaldsen	400 metres	Bye		45.37 SB	11	Did not advance	
Tobias Grønstad	800 metres	1:46.39	18	Did not advance			
Ole Jakob Solbu	800 metres	1:46.16	13 Q	1:45.59	5 q	1:51.33	8
Jakob Ingebrigtsen	1500 metres	3:37.65	1 Q	—N/a		3:31.95 CR	1st place, gold medalist(s)
Narve Gilje Nordås	1500 metres	3:46.15	12	—N/a		Did not advance	
Henrik Ingebrigtsen	5000 metres	—N/a				13:52.71	25
Jakob Ingebrigtsen	5000 metres	—N/a				13:20.11 SB	1st place, gold medalist(s)
Narve Gilje Nordås	5000 metres	—N/a				13:26.91 SB	11
Per Svela	5000 metres	—N/a				13:38.72	21
Bjørnar Sandnes Lillefosse	10,000 metres	—N/a				29:47.03 SB	37
Weldu Negash Gebretsadik	Half marathon	—N/a				1:05:54 SB	44
Awet Nftalem Kibrab	Half marathon	—N/a				DNF	
Zerei Kbrom Mezngi	Half marathon	—N/a				1:03:32	26
Sondre Nordstad Moen	Half marathon	—N/a				1:02:03	12
Weldu Negash Gebretsadik; Awet Nftalem Kibrab; Zerei Kbrom Mezngi; Sondre Nordstad Moen	Half marathon team	—N/a				3:11:29	6
Vladimir Vukicevic	110 metres hurdles	13.93	17	Did not advance			
Karsten Warholm	400 metres hurdles	Bye		48.75	8 Q	46.98 CR	1st place, gold medalist(s)
Jacob Boutera	3000 metres steeplechase	8:38.22	10	—N/a		Did not advance	
Tom Erling Kårbø	3000 metres steeplechase	8:39.99	12	—N/a		Did not advance	
Fredrik Sandvik	3000 metres steeplechase	8:28.47 SB	9	—N/a		Did not advance	

Field events

Athlete	Event	Qualification		Final	
Athlete	Event	Distance	Position	Distance	Position
Simen Guttormsen	Pole vault	5.45	17	Did not advance	
Pål Haugen Lillefosse	Pole vault	DNS			
Ingar Bratseth-Kiplesund	Long jump	7.82 SB	19	Did not advance	
Henrik Flåtnes	Long jump	7.58	26	Did not advance	
Marcus Thomsen	Shot put	20.69	2 q	20.42	8
Ola Stunes Isene	Discus throw	58.03	29	Did not advance	
Kasper Sagen	Javelin throw	74.50	22	Did not advance	
Eivind Henriksen	Hammer throw	75.49 SB	7 q	76.51 SB	7
Thomas Mardal	Hammer throw	71.16	28	Did not advance	

Combined events – Decathlon

Athlete	Event	100 m	LJ	SP	HJ	400 m	110H	DT	PV	JT	1500 m	Final	Rank
Markus Rooth	Result	10.89 SB	8.01 PB	15.27	1.99 SB	48.03 PB	14.59 SB	46.54 SB	5.10 =PB	DNF			
Markus Rooth	Points	885	1063	806	794	908	900	799	941	DNF			
Sander Skotheim	Result	10.82 SB	7.93	13.96	2.17 SB	47.50 PB	14.30 SB	46.18	4.60	61.27 SB	4:22.41 SB	8635 EU23L	2nd place, silver medalist(s)
Sander Skotheim	Points	901	1043	726	963	933	936	791	790	757	795	8635 EU23L	2nd place, silver medalist(s)

=== Women ===
Track and road events

Athlete	Event	Heat		Semifinal		Final	
Athlete	Event	Result	Rank	Result	Rank	Result	Rank
Henriette Jæger	200 metres	Bye		22.71	4 Q	22.83	4
Christine Bjelland Jensen	200 metres	23.68 =SB	21	Did not advance			
Astri Ertzgaard	400 metres	52.78	16 q	52.82	22	Did not advance	
Ingeborg Østgård	1500 metres	4:12.73	11	—N/a		Did not advance	
Amalie Sæten	1500 metres	4:16.07	11	—N/a		Did not advance	
Kristine Eikrem Engeset	5000 metres	—N/a				15:20.02 PB	14
Karoline Bjerkeli Grøvdal	5000 metres	—N/a				14:38.62 SB	2nd place, silver medalist(s)
Amalie Sæten	5000 metres	—N/a				15:17.41 PB	11
Hanne Mjøen Maridal	10,000 metres	—N/a				32:50.62 PB	17
Karoline Bjerkeli Grøvdal	Half marathon	—N/a				1:08:09 CR	1st place, gold medalist(s)
Hanne Mjøen Maridal	Half marathon	—N/a				1:14:09 SB	48
Maria Sagnes Wågan	Half marathon	—N/a				1:17:02	63
Karoline Bjerkeli Grøvdal; Hanne Mjøen Maridal; Maria Sagnes Wågan	Half marathon team	—N/a				3:39:20	9
Lovise Skarbøvik Andresen	100 metres hurdles	12.96 PB	3 q	12.89 PB	11	Did not advance	
Amalie Iuel	400 metres hurdles	56.23	12 q	54.89 =SB	10	Did not advance	
Line Kloster	400 metres hurdles	Bye		54.56 SB	5 Q	55.29	6
Elisabeth Slettum	400 metres hurdles	57.16 SB	20	Did not advance			
Josefine Tomine Eriksen; Astri Ertzgaard; Elisabeth Slettum; Amalie Iuel	4 × 400 metres relay	3:26.05 NR	9	—N/a		Did not advance	

Field events

Athlete	Event	Qualification		Final	
Athlete	Event	Distance	Position	Distance	Position
Kitty Friele Faye	Pole vault	4.40	13	Did not advance	
Lene Onsrud Retzius	Pole vault	NM		Did not advance	
Sigrid Borge	Javelin throw	56.44	14	Did not advance	
Marie-Therese Obst	Javelin throw	61.45	1 Q	63.50 PB	3rd place, bronze medalist(s)
Beatrice Nedberge Llano	Hammer throw	66.53	22	Did not advance	
