= 2015 European Athletics U23 Championships – Women's 800 metres =

The women's 800 metres event at the 2015 European Athletics U23 Championships was held in Tallinn, Estonia, at Kadriorg Stadium on 9 and 11 July.

== Medalists ==
Gold	Rénelle Lamote; France
Silver	Anastasiya Tkachuk; Ukraine
Bronze	Christina Hering; Germany

== Results ==
=== Final ===
11 July

Rank	Name	Nationality	Time	Notes
1st place, gold medalist(s)	Rénelle Lamote	France	2:00.19	
2nd place, silver medalist(s)	Anastasiya Tkachuk	Ukraine	2:00.43	
3rd place, bronze medalist(s)	Christina Hering	Germany	2:00.88	PB
4	Adelle Tracey	United Kingdom	2:01.66	
5	Anna Silvander	Sweden	2:02.53	PB
6	Katie Snowden	United Kingdom	2:03.45	
7	Adelina Elena Tanasie	Romania	2:03.92	PB
8	Syntia Ellward	Poland	2:04.42	

=== Heats ===
9 July

==== Heat 1 ====
Rank	Name	Nationality	Time	Notes
1	Anastasiya Tkachuk	Ukraine	2:02.03	Q
2	Christina Hering	Germany	2:03.16	Q
3	Anna Silvander	Sweden	2:03.47	q
4	Aslı Arık	Turkey	2:05.27	
5	Bianka Kéri	Hungary	2:05.30	
6	Julie Frøslev Mathisen	Norway	2:19.21	

==== Heat 2 ====
Rank	Name	Nationality	Time	Notes
1	Adelina Elena Tanasie	Romania	2:04.84	Q
2	Adelle Tracey	United Kingdom	2:04.85	Q
3	Olena Sidorska	Ukraine	2:04.88	
4	Irene Baldessari	Italy	2:06.69	
5	Ida Holm	Sweden	2:07.59	
6	Monika Georgieva	Bulgaria	2:07.74	

==== Heat 3 ====
Rank	Name	Nationality	Time	Notes
1	Rénelle Lamote	France	2:02.75	Q
2	Syntia Ellward	Poland	2:03.45	Q
3	Katie Snowden	United Kingdom	2:04.67	q
4	Carina Schrempf	Austria	2:06.08	
5	Joyce Mattagliano	Italy	2:06.55	

== Participation ==
According to an unofficial count, 17 athletes from 13 countries participated in the event.

- Austria (1)
- Bulgaria (1)
- France (1)
- Germany (1)
- Hungary (1)
- Italy (2)
- Norway (1)
- Poland (1)
- Romania (1)
- Sweden (2)
- Turkey (1)
- Ukraine (2)
- United Kingdom (2)
