= 2016 European Athletics Championships – Women's 800 metres =

Women's 800 metres at the 2016 European Athletics Championships
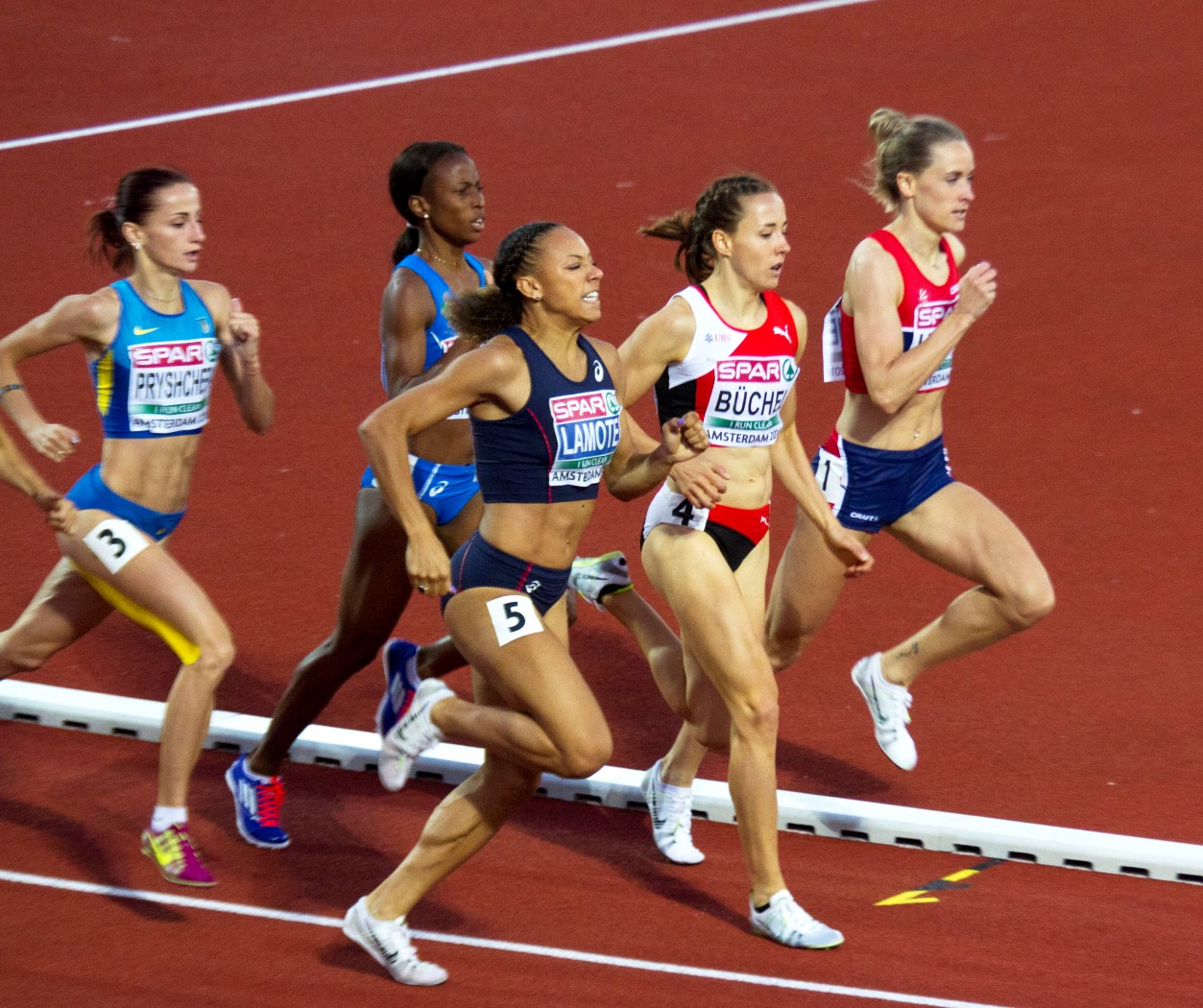
- Final race
- Venue: Olympic Stadium
- Location: Amsterdam, Netherlands
- Dates: 6 July 2016 (round 1); 7 July 2016 (semi-finals); 9 July 2016 (final)
- Competitors: 36 from 23 nations
- Winning time: 1:59.70 min

Medalists
gold medal	Nataliya Pryshchepa	Ukraine
silver medal	Rénelle Lamote	France
bronze medal	Lovisa Lindh	Sweden

The women's 800 metres at the 2016 European Athletics Championships was held over three rounds at the Olympic Stadium in Amsterdam, Netherlands, from 6 to 9 July 2016.

== Background ==
Records before the 2016 European Athletics Championships
Record	Athlete (nation)	Time	Location	Date
World record	Jarmila Kratochvílová (TCH)	1:53.28	Munich, West Germany	26 July 1983
European record	Jarmila Kratochvílová (TCH)	1:53.28	Munich, West Germany	26 July 1983
Championship record	Olga Mineyeva (URS)	1:55.41	Athens, Greece	8 September 1982
World leading	Caster Semenya (RSA)	1:56.64	Rabat, Morocco	22 May 2016
European leading	Rénelle Lamote (FRA)	1:58.01	Birmingham, United Kingdom	5 June 2016

== Results ==
=== Round 1 ===
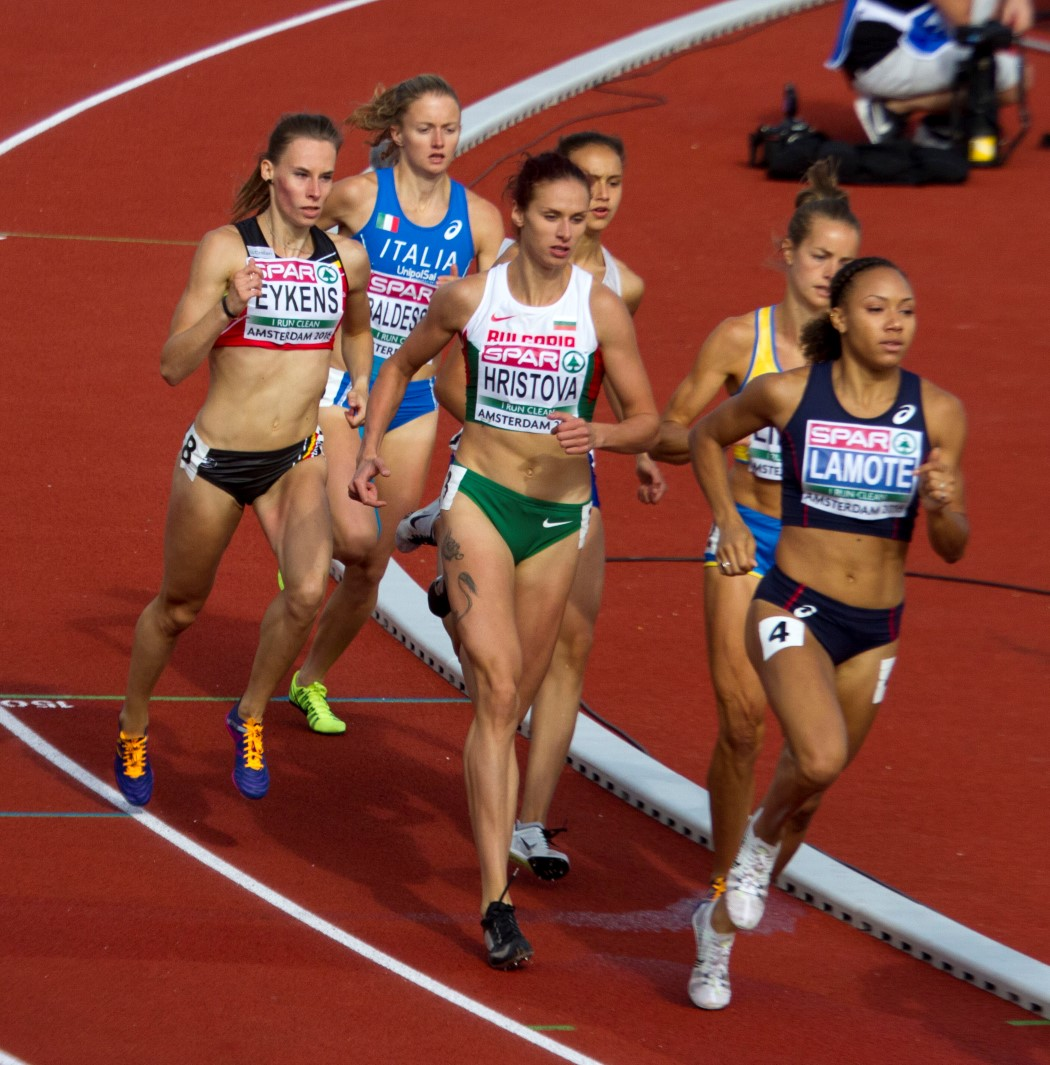
First heat of round 1

On 6 July 2016, thirty-two athletes from twenty-two nations and one independent athlete in the five heats of round 1, starting at 18:25 (UTC+2). Twenty-four athletes, the first four athletes in each heat (Q) and the next fastest four athletes overall (q), qualified for the semi-finals.

Results of round 1
Rank	Heat	Lane	Athlete	Nation	Time	Note
1	1	4	Rénelle Lamote	France	2:01.60	Q
2	1	2	Lovisa Lindh	Sweden	2:01.77	Q
3	1	5	Hedda Hynne	Norway	2:01.85	Q
4	1	7	Aníta Hinriksdóttir	Iceland	2:02.44	Q
5	3	3	Nataliya Pryshchepa	Ukraine	2:02.57	Q
6	1	8	Renée Eykens	Belgium	2:02.76	q
7	5	6	Jenny Meadows	Great Britain & N.I.	2:03.10	Q
8	5	5	Trine Mjåland	Norway	2:03.13	Q
9	3	8	Alison Leonard	Great Britain & N.I.	2:03.64	Q
10	5	2	Esther Guerrero	Spain	2:03.72	Q
11	3	5	Yuliya Karol	Belarus	2:03.78	Q
12	5	3	Anastasiya Tkachuk	Ukraine	2:03.80	Q
13	3	4	Anna Silvander	Sweden	2:03.95	Q
14	3	7	Florina Pierdevara	Romania	2:04.28	q
15	2	4	Selina Büchel	Switzerland	2:04.50	Q
16	4	5	Nataliya Lupu	Ukraine	2:04.53	Q
17	4	7	Yusneysi Santiusti	Italy	2:04.53	Q
18	3	2	Alexandra Štuková	Slovakia	2:04.58	q
19	5	4	Anastasiya Komarova	Azerbaijan	2:04.60	q, SB
20	4	8	Joanna Jóźwik	Poland	2:04.62	Q
21	2	3	Sanne Verstegen	Netherlands	2:04.69	Q
22	4	6	Bianka Kéri	Hungary	2:04.90	Q
23	4	3	Síofra Cléirigh Büttner	Ireland	2:04.97	
24	4	4	Adelle Tracey	Great Britain & N.I.	2:05.41	
25	3	6	Fabienne Kohlmann	Germany	2:05.54	
26	1	3	Katia Hristova	Bulgaria	2:05.72	
27	2	6	Natalia Evangelidou	Cyprus	2:05.73	Q
28	2	1	Christina Hering	Germany	2:05.78	Q
29	2	5	Yngvild Elvemo	Norway	2:05.78	
30	1	6	Irene Baldessari	Italy	2:06.15	
31	2	8	Eglė Balčiūnaitė	Lithuania	2:08.14	
	2	2	Yuliya Stepanova	EAA	DQ	R 163.3a
	4	2	Claudia Bobocea	Romania	DNF	
	2	7	Angelika Cichocka	Poland	DNS	
	5	7	Sofia Ennaoui	Poland	DNS	
	5	8	Justine Fedronic	France	DNS	

- EAA : Independent athlete competing under European Athletics Association flag.

=== Semi-finals ===
On 7 July 2016, twenty-four athletes from nineteen nations competed in the three heats of the semi-finals, starting at 18:50 (UTC+2). Eight athletes, the first two athletes in each heat (Q) and the next two fastest athletes overall (q), qualified for the final.

Results of the semi-finals
Rank	Heat	Lane	Athlete	Nation	Time	Note
1	2	5	Rénelle Lamote	France	1:59.87	Q
2	2	4	Selina Büchel	Switzerland	2:00.30	Q, SB
3	2	3	Lovisa Lindh	Sweden	2:00.66	q
4	2	6	Aníta Hinriksdóttir	Iceland	2:01.41	q
5	1	4	Joanna Jóźwik	Poland	2:01.52	Q
6	1	7	Hedda Hynne	Norway	2:01.57	Q
7	2	8	Esther Guerrero	Spain	2:01.62	
8	2	2	Trine Mjåland	Norway	2:01.73	SB
9	1	6	Nataliya Lupu	Ukraine	2:01.74	
10	3	4	Nataliya Pryshchepa	Ukraine	2:01.75	Q
11	2	7	Anastasiya Tkachuk	Ukraine	2:01.91	
12	3	5	Yusneysi Santiusti	Italy	2:02.21	Q
13	3	3	Alison Leonard	Great Britain & N.I.	2:02.31	
14	1	8	Renée Eykens	Belgium	2:02.38	
15	1	3	Christina Hering	Germany	2:02.56	
16	3	7	Florina Pierdevara	Romania	2:02.75	
17	1	5	Jenny Meadows	Great Britain & N.I.	2:03.13	
18	3	8	Yuliya Karol	Belarus	2:03.17	
19	1	1	Alexandra Štuková	Slovakia	2:03.27	
20	2	1	Anastasiya Komarova	Azerbaijan	2:03.32	SB
21	3	6	Sanne Verstegen	Netherlands	2:03.33	
22	1	2	Anna Silvander	Sweden	2:03.37	
23	3	1	Bianka Kéri	Hungary	2:03.47	
24	3	2	Natalia Evangelidou	Cyprus	2:03.99	

=== Final ===
On 9 July 2016, eight athletes from eight different nations competed in the final at 21:40 (UTC+2). The race was won by Nataliya Pryshchepa of Ukraine in 1:59.70 min, followed by Rénelle Lamote of France in second place in 2:00.19 min and Lovisa Lindh of Sweden in third place in 2:00.37 min.

Results of the final
Rank	Lane	Athlete	Nation	Time	Note
1st place, gold medalist(s)	3	Nataliya Pryshchepa	Ukraine	1:59.70	
2nd place, silver medalist(s)	5	Rénelle Lamote	France	2:00.19	
3rd place, bronze medalist(s)	7	Lovisa Lindh	Sweden	2:00.37	PB
4	4	Selina Büchel	Switzerland	2:00.47	
5	6	Yusneysi Santiusti	Italy	2:00.53	
6	2	Joanna Jóźwik	Poland	2:00.57	SB
7	1	Hedda Hynne	Norway	2:00.94	PB
8	8	Aníta Hinriksdóttir	Iceland	2:02.55	
