= 2016 European Athletics Championships – Women's 400 metres =

Women's 400 metres at the 2016 European Athletics Championships
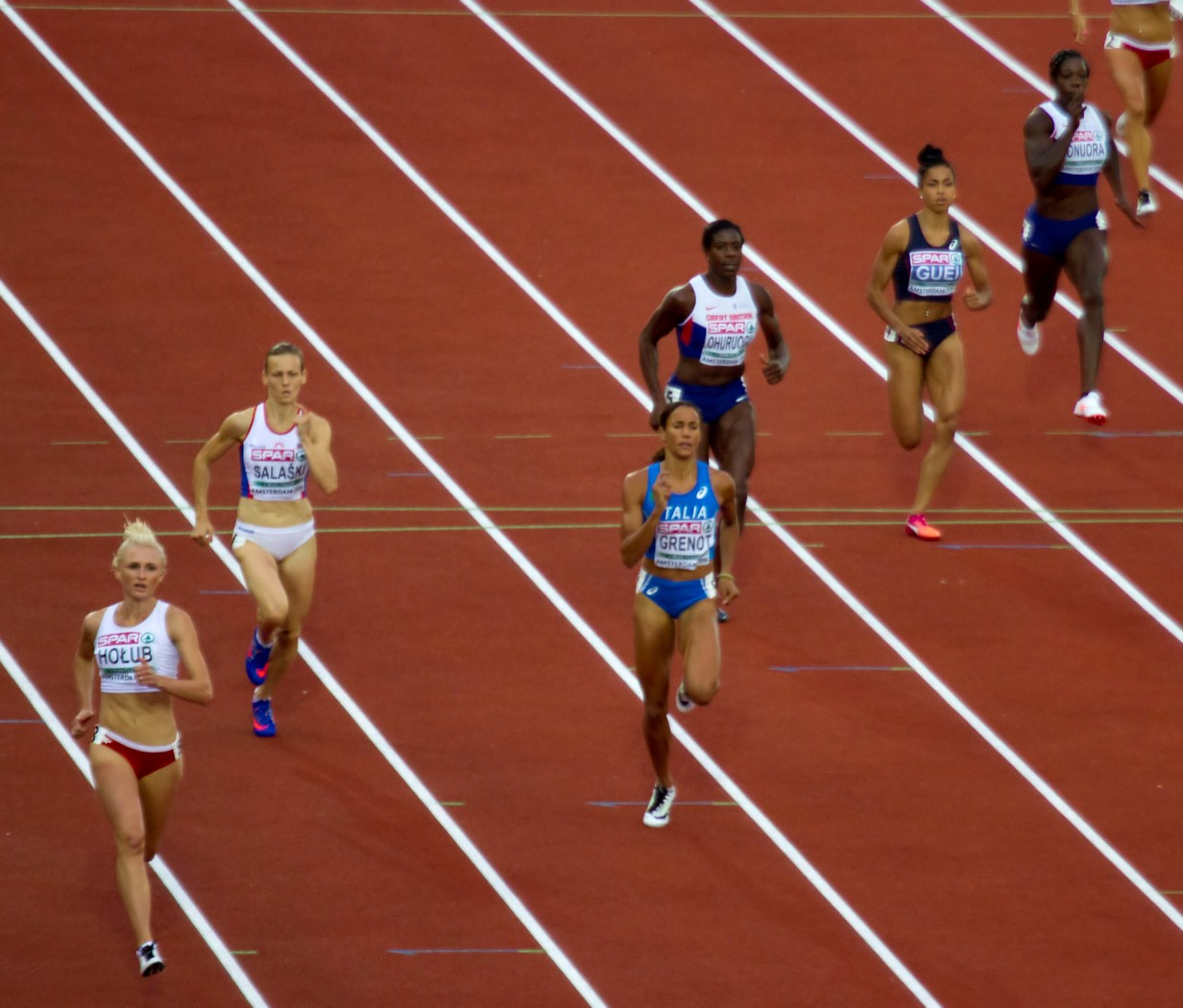
- Medalists Libania Grenot, Floria Gueï, and Anyika Onuora (third, fifth, and sixth from the left) during the final
- Venue: Olympic Stadium
- Location: Amsterdam, Netherlands
- Dates: 6 July 2016 (qualifying round); 7 July 2016 (semifinals); 8 July 2016 (final)
- Competitors: 31 from 18 nations
- Winning time: 50.73 s

Medalists
gold medal	Libania Grenot	Italy
silver medal	Floria Gueï	France
bronze medal	Anyika Onuora	Great Britain and Northern Ireland

The women's 400 metres at the 2016 European Athletics Championships was held over three rounds at the Olympic Stadium in Amsterdam, Netherlands, on 6, 7, and 8 July 2016. It was the eighteenth time that this event was contested at the European Athletics Championships. Athletes could qualify by achieving the entry standard of 53.40 seconds or by their placement at selected athletics meetings. Thirty-one athletes from eighteen nations competed in the event.

Twenty athletes started in the qualifying round, where thirteen advanced to the semifinals. Eleven athletes, who had a bye in the qualifying round, joined them there. Eight athletes advanced to the final, which was won by defending champion Libania Grenot of Italy in 50.73 seconds, followed by Floria Gueï of France in 51.21 seconds in second place and Anyika Onuora of Great Britain and Northern Ireland in 51.47 seconds in third place.

== Background ==
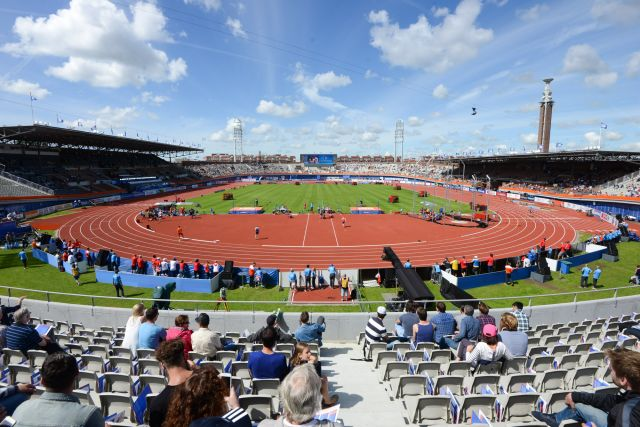
Olympic Stadium on 6 July 2016

At the European Athletics Championships, the women's 400 metres had been contested seventeen times before 2016, at every edition since its introduction in 1958. In the event, athletes run one lap on a 400-metre athletics track in designated lanes.

At the start of the 2016 championships, Marita Koch of East Germany held the European and world record of 47.60 s set in 1985 and the championship record of 48.16 s set in 1982. Allyson Felix of the United States had set a world leading time of 49.68 s on 3 July 2016 and Antonina Krivoshapka of Russia had set a European leading time of 50.70 s on 21 June 2016. Libania Grenot of Italy was the defending champion after winning the 2014 title in 51.10 s.

The event was held at the Olympic Stadium in Amsterdam, Netherlands. The stadium was built for the 1928 Summer Olympics and renovated in 1996. During the 2016 European Athletics Championships, it had a capacity of around 20,000 spectators.

Records before to the 2016 European Athletics Championships
Record	Athlete (nation)	Time	Location	Date
World record	Marita Koch (GDR)	47.60	Canberra, Australia	6 October 1985
European record	Marita Koch (GDR)	47.60	Canberra, Australia	6 October 1985
Championship record	Marita Koch (GDR)	48.16	Athens, Greece	8 September 1982
World leading	Allyson Felix (USA)	49.68	Eugene, Oregon, United States	3 July 2016
European leading	Antonina Krivoshapka (RUS)	50.70	Cheboksary, Russia	21 June 2016

== Qualification ==
For this event, the qualification period was from 1 January 2015 until 26 June 2016. Athletes could qualify by achieving the entry standard with a performance of 53.40 s or faster, by finishing in the top three at a European Athletics Premium meeting, or by winning at a European Athletics Classic meeting. Up to three athletes from one nation could participate. The host nation could enter one unqualified athlete if no athletes had qualified. There was a target of 32 athletes. European Athletics published a final entry list with 32 athletes on 1 July 2016.

== Results ==
=== Qualifying round ===
Twenty athletes from thirteen nations competed in the three heats of the qualifying round on 6 July 2016, starting at 13:10 (UTC+2). The first three athletes in each heat (Q) and the next fastest four athletes overall (q) advanced to the semifinals. In the second heat, Benedicte Hauge of Norway set a personal best (PB) of 53.13 s. In the third heat, Indira Terrero of Spain did not finish (DNF).

Results of the qualifying round
Rank	Heat	Lane	Athlete	Nation	Time	Note
1	2	5	Nicky van Leuveren	Netherlands	52.45	Q
2	1	4	Christine Ohuruogu	Great Britain & N.I.	52.69	Q
3	2	3	Patrycja Wyciszkiewicz	Poland	52.79	Q
4	3	2	Lisanne de Witte	Netherlands	52.84	Q
5	2	6	Adelina Pastor	Romania	53.03	Q, SB
6	2	8	Benedicte Hauge	Norway	53.13	q, PB
7	1	6	Gunta Latiševa-Cudare	Latvia	53.36	Q, SB
8	1	5	Aauri Lorena Bokesa	Spain	53.46	Q
9	1	7	Maria Benedicta Chigbolu	Italy	53.51	q
10	3	6	Irini Vasiliou	Greece	53.86	Q
11	3	4	Sinead Denny	Ireland	53.95	Q
12	1	8	Iveta Putálová	Slovakia	53.96	q
13	2	4	Anna Vasiliou	Greece	53.98	q
14	2	7	Laura Bueno	Spain	54.01	
15	1	2	Sanda Belgyan	Romania	54.33	
16	3	5	Ilona Usovich	Belarus	54.58	
17	3	3	Marta Milani	Italy	54.85	
18	1	3	Claire Mooney	Ireland	55.66	
19	2	2	Vijona Kryeziu	Kosovo	56.04	SB
	3	7	Indira Terrero	Spain	DNF	

=== Semifinals ===
Twenty-four athletes from sixteen nations – thirteen who advanced from the qualifying round plus eleven who had a bye in that round because they had the highest season ranking – competed in the three heats of the semifinals on 7 July 2016, starting at 17:35 (UTC+2). The first two athletes of each heat (Q) and the next two fastest athletes overall (q) qualified for the final. In the first heat, Nicky van Leuveren of the Netherlands ran a personal best (PB) of 52.02 s. In the third heat, Libania Grenot of Italy ran a European leading time (EL) of 50.43 s and Małgorzata Hołub ran a person best of 51.67 s.

Results of the semifinals
Rank	Heat	Lane	Athlete	Nation	Time	Note
1	3	3	Libania Grenot*	Italy	50.43	Q, EL
2	1	4	Floria Gueï*	France	51.01	Q
3	1	5	Christine Ohuruogu	Great Britain & N.I.	51.35	Q, SB
4	3	6	Małgorzata Hołub*	Poland	51.67	Q, PB
5	2	5	Anyika Onuora*	Great Britain & N.I.	51.84	Q
6	1	7	Nicky van Leuveren	Netherlands	52.02	q, PB
7	2	6	Tamara Salaški*	Serbia	52.27	Q
8	1	3	Justyna Święty*	Poland	52.34	q
9	2	7	Lisanne de Witte	Netherlands	52.37	
10	3	7	Aauri Lorena Bokesa	Spain	52.39	SB
11	2	3	Ruth Sophia Spelmeyer*	Germany	52.40	
12	3	4	Cátia Azevedo*	Portugal	52.46	
13	3	5	Yuliya Olishevska*	Ukraine	52.54	
14	2	4	Olha Zemlyak*	Ukraine	52.58	
14	3	8	Irin Vasiliou	Greece	52.58	
16	1	8	Maria Benedicta Chigbolu	Italy	52.69	
17	3	2	Adelina Pastor	Romania	52.90	SB
18	2	8	Patrycja Wyciszkiewicz	Poland	52.92	
19	1	6	Olha Bibik*	Ukraine	53.02	
20	1	2	Gunta Latiševa-Cudare	Latvia	53.11	SB
21	3	1	Sinead Denny	Ireland	53.27	
22	1	1	Anna Vasiliou	Greece	53.77	
23	2	2	Iveta Putálová	Slovakia	54.04	
24	2	1	Benedicte Hauge	Norway	54.50	

*Athletes who received a bye to the semifinals

=== Final ===
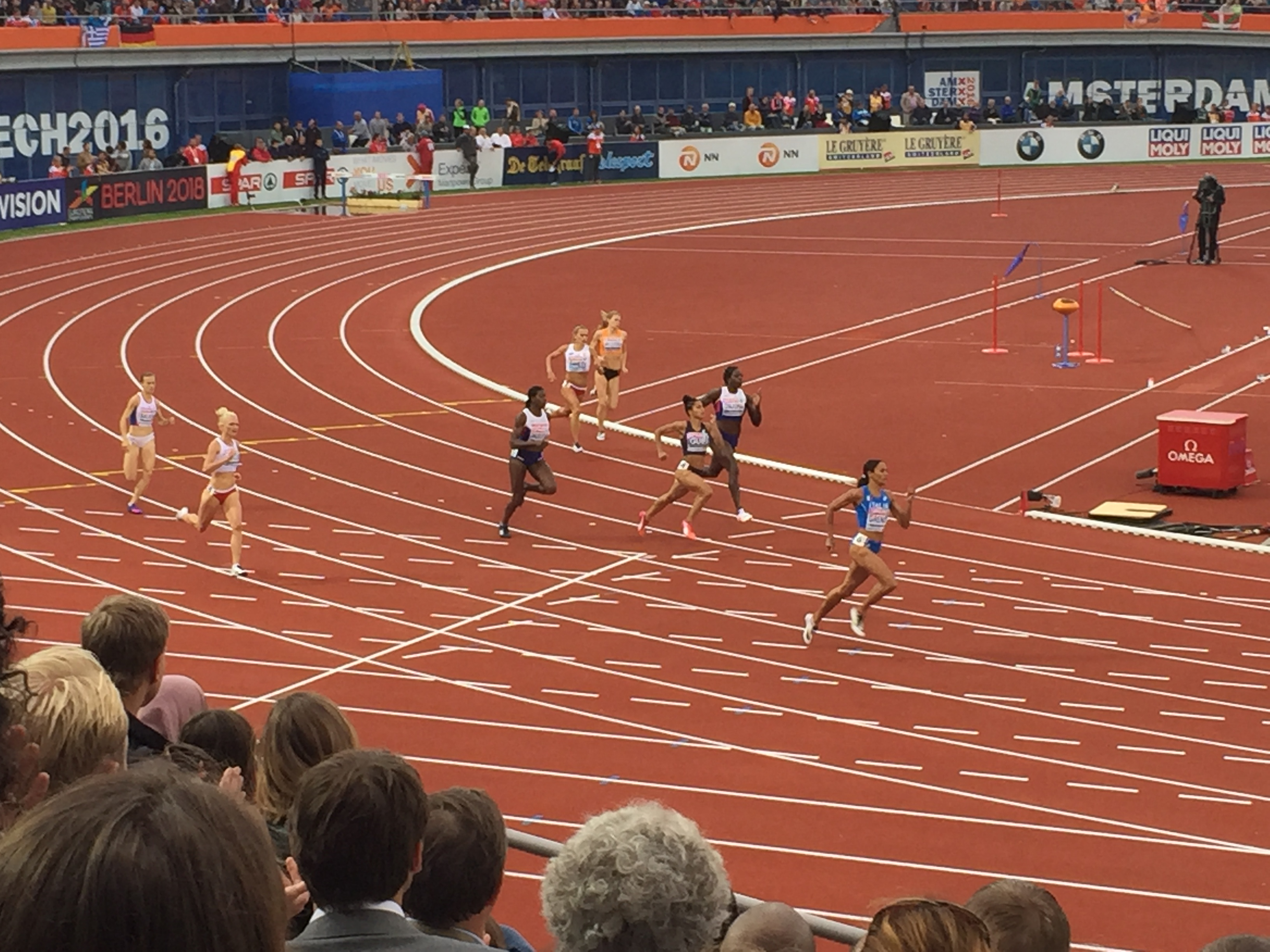
Finalists at the end of the second bend

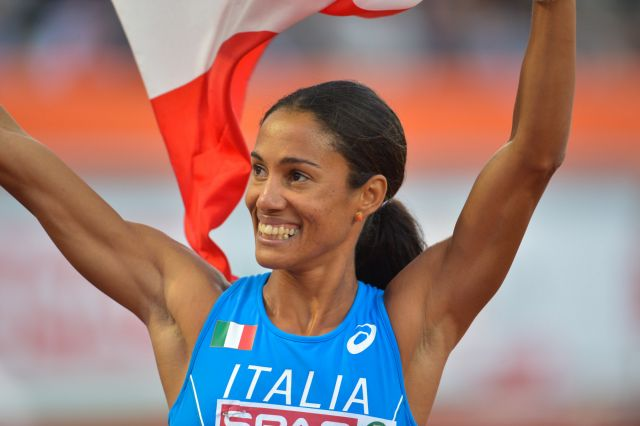
Winner Libania Grenot of Italy

Eight athletes from six nations competed in the final on 8 July 2016, starting at 20:25 (UTC+2). Libania Grenot of Italy came off the second bend in the lead. Floria Gueï of France and Anyika Onuora of Great Britain and Northern Ireland were gaining ground in the last 100 metres, but they didn't overtake the Italian. Grenot won the race in 50.73 s, followed by Gueï in 51.21 s in second place and Onuora in 51.47 s in third place. While Grenot and Gueï were 0.30 s and 0.20 s slower than in the semifinals, Onuora was 0.37 s faster resulting in her season's best (SB).

According to Steve Smythe of Athletics Weekly, Grenot won "comfortably". Thomas Byrne of the IAAF wrote that Grenot was "a cut above in the final". Daniele Perboni of the Italian La Gazzetta dello Sport described Grenot's victory as: "A European title strongly desired and sought, with determination, anger, and courage." Grenot became the first athlete to successfully defend her 400 metres title since world record holder Marita Koch in 1986.

The medalists were each interviewed about the race. Grenot said: "I'm more determined than ever, finally number 1 in front of my name." Gueï said: "I gave my all. The medal is what I dreamt of, and now I've got it." And Onuora said: "This means the world to me. I have been competing for 15 years. This is the first time I have had the chance to compete for an individual medal."

Results of the final
Rank	Lane	Athlete	Nation	Time	Note
1st place, gold medalist(s)	6	Libania Grenot	Italy	50.73	
2nd place, silver medalist(s)	4	Floria Gueï	France	51.21	
3rd place, bronze medalist(s)	3	Anyika Onuora	Great Britain & N.I.	51.47	SB
4	5	Christine Ohuruogu	Great Britain & N.I.	51.55	
5	8	Małgorzata Hołub	Poland	51.89	
6	2	Justyna Święty	Poland	51.96	
7	7	Tamara Salaški	Serbia	52.23	
8	1	Nicky van Leuveren	Netherlands	52.76	
