= Norway at the 2014 European Athletics Championships =

- WA code: NOR

in Zürich
- Competitors: 40
- Medals: Gold 0 Silver 1 Bronze 0 Total 1

European Athletics Championships appearances
- 1934; 1938; 1946; 1950; 1954; 1958; 1962; 1966; 1969; 1971; 1974; 1978; 1982; 1986; 1990; 1994; 1998; 2002; 2006; 2010; 2012; 2014; 2016; 2018; 2022; 2024; 2026

Norway competed at the 2014 European Athletics Championships in Zurich, Switzerland, between 12 and 17 August 2014. A delegation of 40 athletes were sent to represent the country.

== Medals ==
Medal	Name	Event	Date
Silver	Henrik Ingebrigtsen	Men's 1500 metres	17 August
