= Gebretsadik =

Gebretsadik is a given name and surname. Notable people with the name include:

- Gebretsadik Abraha (born 1992), Ethiopian long-distance runner
- Weldu Negash Gebretsadik (born 1986), Norwegian long-distance runner
