= Norway at the 2016 European Athletics Championships =

- WA code: NOR
- National federation: NFIF
- Website: www.friidrett.no

in Amsterdam
- Competitors: 51 (28 men and 23 women) in 31 events
- Medals Ranked 13th: Gold 1 Silver 0 Bronze 2 Total 3

European Athletics Championships appearances
- 1934; 1938; 1946; 1950; 1954; 1958; 1962; 1966; 1969; 1971; 1974; 1978; 1982; 1986; 1990; 1994; 1998; 2002; 2006; 2010; 2012; 2014; 2016; 2018; 2022; 2024

Norway competed at the 2016 European Athletics Championships in Amsterdam, Netherlands, between 6 and 10 July 2016.

== Medals ==
Medal	Name	Event	Date
Gold	Filip Ingebrigtsen	Men's 1500 metres	9 July
Bronze	Karoline Bjerkeli Grøvdal	Women's 10,000 metres	6 July
Bronze	Henrik Ingebrigtsen	Men's 1500 metres	9 July

== Results ==
Men

Track & road events

Athlete	Event	Heat		Semifinal		Final	
Athlete	Event	Result	Rank	Result	Rank	Result	Rank
Jaysuma Saidy Ndure	200 m	Bye		20.92	15	did not advance	
Filip Ingebrigtsen	1500 m	3:40.23	6 Q	—		3:46.65	1st place, gold medalist(s)
Snorre Holtan Løken	1500 m	3:42.97	17	—		did not advance	
Henrik Ingebrigtsen	1500 m	3:39.66	2 Q	—		3:47.18	3rd place, bronze medalist(s)
Henrik Ingebrigtsen	5000 m	—				13:40.86	4
Sindre Buraas	5000 m	—				14:26.05	18
Vladimir Vukicevic	110 m hurdles	13.76	=11 q	13.54 NR	14	did not advance	
Øyvind Kjerpeset	400 m hurdles	51.05	11	did not advance			
Karsten Warholm	400 m hurdles	Bye		48.84 NR	2 Q	49.82	6
Tom Erling Kårbø	3000 m steeplechase	8:42.72	16	—		did not advance	
Bjørnar Ustad Kristensen	3000 m steeplechase	8:54.73	20	—		did not advance	
Jonas Tapani Halonen; Håkon Morken; Jaysuma Saidy Ndure; Jonathan Quarcoo	4 x 100 m relay	39.35 SB	10	—		did not advance	
Mauritz Kashagen; Torbjørn Lysne; Josh-Kevin Ramirez Talm; Karsten Warholm	4 x 400 m relay	3:10.76 SB	16	—		did not advance	
Asbjørn Ellefsen Persen	Half marathon	—				1:05:56	30
Eirik Gramstad	Half marathon	—				1:09:55	75
Hans Kristian Fløystad	Half marathon	—				1:08:55	68
Jonas Lurås Hammer	Half marathon	—				1:08:06	60
Marius Øyre Vedvik	Half marathon	—				1:06:29	37
Ørjan Grønnevig	Half marathon	—				1:18:12	84
National team	Half marathon	—				3:20:31	12

Field Events

Athlete	Event	Qualification		Final	
Athlete	Event	Distance	Rank	Distance	Rank
Eirik Greibrokk Dolve	Pole vault	5.15	=24	did not advance	
Sven Martin Skagestad	Discus throw	62.04	16	did not advance	
Eivind Henriksen	Hammer throw	71.93	16	did not advance	

Combined events – Decathlon

Athlete	Event	100 m	LJ	SP	HJ	400 m	110H	DT	PV	JT	1500 m	Final	Rank
Lars Vikan Rise	Result	11.40	NM	15.17	1.98	51.45	DNS					DNF	
Lars Vikan Rise	Points	774	0	800	785	749	0					DNF	
Martin Roe	Result	10.86	7.50 PB	14.58	1.89	50.13	16.04	47.74 PB	4.50	57.14	4:39.44	7795	11
Martin Roe	Points	892	935	764	705	809	728	823	760	695	684	7795	11

Women

Track & road events

Athlete	Event	Heat		Semifinal		Final	
Athlete	Event	Result	Rank	Result	Rank	Result	Rank
Ezinne Okparaebo	100 m	11.45	=9 Q	11.44	=10	did not advance	
Benedicte Hauge	400 m	53.13 PB	6 q	54.50	24	did not advance	
Yngvild Elvemo	800 m	2:05.78	29	did not advance			
Hedda Hynne	800 m	2:01.85	3 Q	2:01.57	6 Q	2:00.94 PB	7
Trine Mjåland	800 m	2:03.13	8 Q	2:01.73 SB	8	did not advance	
Ingvill Måkestad Bovim	1500 m	4:11.54	6 q	—		4:34.15	4
Karoline Bjerkeli Grøvdal	5000 m	—				DNS	
Karoline Bjerkeli Grøvdal	10000 m	—				31:23.45 PB	3rd place, bronze medalist(s)
Isabelle Pedersen	100 m hurdles	13.07 SB	=6 Q	13.20	17	did not advance	
Amalie Iuel	400 m hurdles	56.98	6 Q	55.79 NR	4 Q	56.24	6
Ingeborg Løvnes	3000 m steeplechase	9:47.50	15 q	—		9:45.75	11
Helene Ronningen; Ida Bakke Hansen; Astrid Mangen Cederkvist; Ezinne Okparaebo	4 x 100 m relay	DNF		—		did not advance	
Benedicte Hauge; Sara Dorothea Jensen; Ida Bakke Hansen; Line Kloster	4 x 400 m relay	3:31.73 NR	12	—		did not advance	
Veronika Brennhovd Blom	Half marathon	—				1:17:45	64
Eli Anne Dvergsdal	Half marathon	—				1:18:29 PB	73
Runa Skrove Falch	Half marathon	—				1:19:11	75
Kristine Helle	Half marathon	—				1:17:50 PB	68
Marthe Katrine Myhre	Half marathon	—				1:19:38	78
National team	Half marathon	—				3:54:04	15

Field Events

Athlete	Event	Qualification		Final	
Athlete	Event	Distance	Rank	Distance	Rank
Katarina Mögenburg	High jump	1.85	=18	did not advance	
Nadia Akpana Assa	Long jump	6.48w	8 q	6.51	8
Sigrid Borge	Javelin throw	56.30	19	did not advance	
