= Romania at the 2016 European Athletics Championships =

- WA code: ROU
- National federation: FRA
- Website: www.fra.ro

in Amsterdam
- Competitors: 22 (8 men and 14 women) in 14 events
- Medals: Gold 0 Silver 0 Bronze 0 Total 0

European Athletics Championships appearances
- 1934; 1938; 1946; 1950; 1954; 1958; 1962; 1966; 1969; 1971; 1974; 1978; 1982; 1986; 1990; 1994; 1998; 2002; 2006; 2010; 2012; 2014; 2016; 2018; 2022; 2024

Romania competed at the 2016 European Athletics Championships in Amsterdam, Netherlands, between 6 and 10 July 2016.

== Results ==
=== Men ===
Track & road events

Athlete	Event	Heat		Semifinal		Final	
Athlete	Event	Result	Rank	Result	Rank	Result	Rank
Ionut Andrei Neagoe	200 m	21.18	17	did not advance			
Daniel Budin; Ioan Andrei Melnicescu; Ionut Andrei Neagoe; Cătălin Cîmpeanu	4 × 100 m relay	39.98	16	—		did not advance	
Marius Ionescu	Half marathon	—				1:05:21	25

Field events

Athlete	Event	Qualification		Final	
Athlete	Event	Distance	Rank	Distance	Rank
Marian Oprea	Triple jump	15.40	27	did not advance	
Andrei Gag	Shot put	19.49	16	did not advance	
Andrei Toader	Shot put	20.00	11 q	20.26	6

=== Women ===
Track & road events

Athlete	Event	Heat		Semifinal		Final	
Athlete	Event	Result	Rank	Result	Rank	Result	Rank
Andreea Ogrăzeanu	100 m	11.79	19	did not advance			
Sanda Belgyan	400 m	54.33	15	did not advance			
Adelina Pastor	400 m	53.03 SB	5 Q	52.90 SB	17	did not advance	
Claudia Bobocea	800 m	did not finish		did not advance			
Florina Pierdevară	800 m	2:04.28	14 q	2:02.75	16	did not advance	
Florina Pierdevară	1500 m	4:12.37	9	—		did not advance	
Claudia Bobocea	1500 m	4:18.98	19	—		did not advance	
Anamaria Nesteriuc	100 m hurdles	13.41	=20	did not advance			
Ancuța Bobocel	3000 m steeplechase	9:48.91	17	—		did not advance	
Sanda Belgyan; Anamaria Ioniță; Andrea Miklós; Adelina Pastor	4 × 400 m relay	3:29.08 SB	6 q	—		3:30.63	8
Liliana Danci	Half marathon	—				Did not finish	
Monica Madalina Florea	Half marathon	—				1:11:56	7
Andreea Alina Piscu	Half marathon	—				1:15:47 PB	45
Paula Todoran	Half marathon	—				1:13:16 SB	22
National team	Half marathon	—				3:40:59	5

Field events

Athlete	Event	Qualification		Final	
Athlete	Event	Distance	Rank	Distance	Rank
Elena Panțuroiu	Triple jump	13.63	16	did not advance	

Key

- Q = Qualified for the next round
- q = Qualified for the next round as a fastest loser or, in field events, by position without achieving the qualifying target
- N/A = Round not applicable for the event
- Bye = Athlete not required to compete in round
