= Christina Hering =

German middle-distance runner

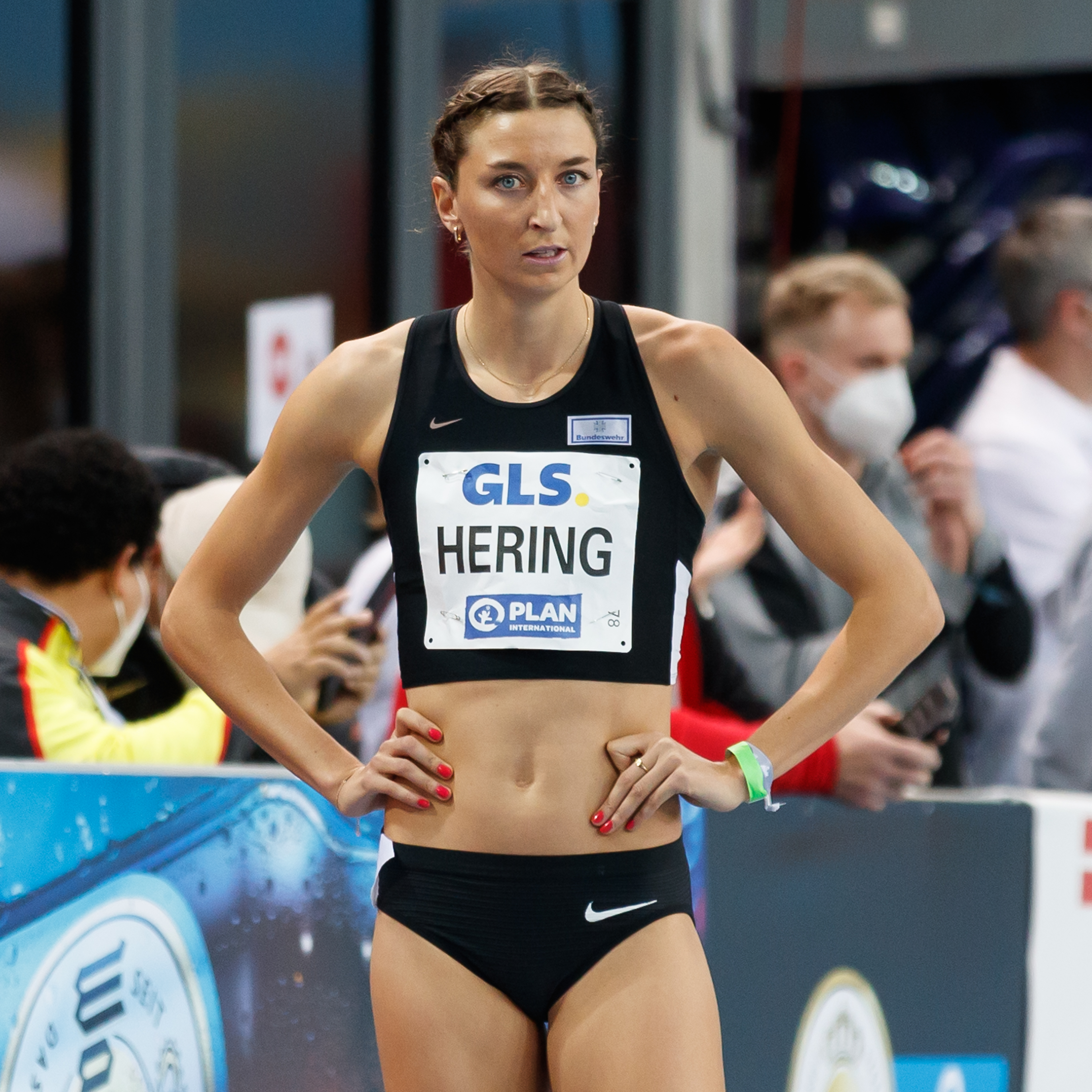
- Hering in 2022

Personal information
- Full name: Christina Annika Hering
- Born: 9 October 1994 (age 31) Munich, Germany
- Education: Technical University of Munich
- Height: 1.87 m (6 ft 2 in)
- Weight: 68 kg (150 lb)

Sport
- Sport: Track and field
- Event: 800 metres
- Club: LG Stadtwerke München
- Coached by: Daniel Stoll

Christina Annika Hering (born 9 October 1994) is a German middle-distance runner specialising in the 800 metres. She represented her country at the 2015 World Championships and 2016 World Indoor Championships.

== Competition record ==
Year	Competition	Venue	Position	Event	Notes
Representing Germany
2013	European Junior Championships	Rieti, Italy	3rd	800 m	2:03.11
2013	European Junior Championships	Rieti, Italy	3rd	4 × 400 m relay	3:33.40
2015	IAAF World Relays	Nassau, Bahamas	5th	Distance medley relay	11:06.14
2015	European U23 Championships	Tallinn, Estonia	3rd	800 m	2:00.88
2015	European U23 Championships	Tallinn, Estonia	4th	4 × 400 m relay	3:32.01
2015	World Championships	Beijing, China	23rd (sf)	800 m	2:00.81
2016	World Indoor Championships	Portland, United States	14th (h)	800 m	2:05.39
2016	European Championships	Amsterdam, Netherlands	15th (sf)	800 m	2:02.56
2016	Olympic Games	Rio de Janeiro, Brazil	33rd (h)	800 m	2:01.04
2017	World Championships	London, United Kingdom	23rd (sf)	800 m	2:02.69
2017	Universiade	Taipei, Taiwan	8th	800 m	2:04.76
2018	European Championships	Berlin, Germany	14th (sf)	800 m	2:04.04
2019	Universiade	Naples, Italy	2nd	800 m	2:01.87
2019	World Championships	Doha, Qatar	19th (h)	800 m	2:03.15
2021	European Indoor Championships	Toruń, Poland	9th (sf)	800 m	2:03.67
2021	Olympic Games	Tokyo, Japan	30th (h)	800 m	2:02.23
2022	World Championships	Eugene, United States	23rd (sf)	800 m	2:01.57
2022	European Championships	Munich, Germany	7th	800 m	2:00.82
2023	World Championships	Budapest, Hungary	22nd (sf)	800 m	2:01.66

== Personal bests ==
Outdoor

- 400 metres – 52.91 (Wetzlar 2015)
- 800 metres – 1:59.54 (Nürnberg 2015)

Indoor

- 400 metres – 54.14 (Karlsruhe 2016)
- 800 metres – 2:00.93 (Glasgow 2016)
