= Adelle Tracey =

Jamaican middle-distance runner (born 1993)

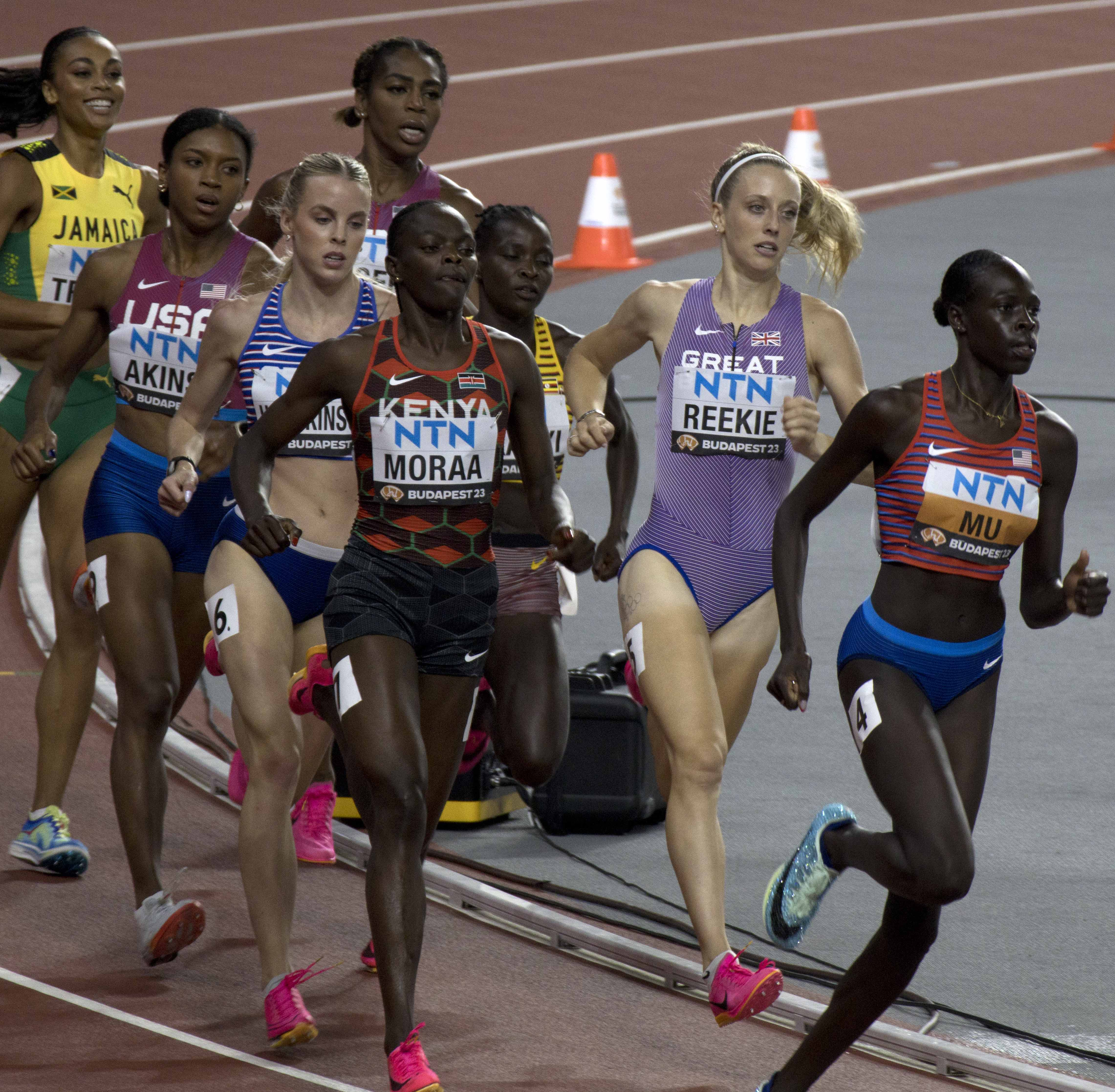
- Tracey in 2023

Personal information
- Nationality: American, British, Jamaican
- Born: 27 May 1993 (age 33) Seattle, Washington, U.S.
- Education: Arts University Bournemouth & St Mary's University, Twickenham
- Height: 1.70 m (5 ft 7 in)
- Weight: 55 kg (121 lb)

Sport
- Country: Jamaica (from 2022); Great Britain (before)
- Sport: Athletics
- Events: 800 metres, 1500 metres
- Club: Guildford & Godalming
- Coached by: Craig Winrow (2013–); Sue Goode (–2013)

Achievements and titles
- Personal bests: 800 m: 1:58.41 (Budapest, 2023); 1500 m: 3:58.77 NR (Budapest, 2023); Indoors; 800 m: 2:00.23 (Glasgow, 2020); 1500 m: 4:10.14 (Liévin, 2023); Mile: 4:30.17 NR (Toruń, 2023)
Medal record
Women's athletics
Representing Great Britain
Athletics World Cup
Silver medal – second place	2018 London	800 m
Representing Jamaica
NACAC Championships
Silver medal – second place	2022 Freeport	1500 m
Bronze medal – third place	2022 Freeport	800 m

Adelle Tracey (born 27 May 1993) is a middle-distance runner primarily in the 800 metres. Tracey has represented Jamaica since 2022 after formerly running for Great Britain.

She placed fourth in the event at the 2018 European Athletics Championships, but claimed a bronze in the North American equivalent, the 2022 NACAC Championships representing her new country, Jamaica. The following day, Tracey won silver for Jamaica in the 1500 metres event in the same championships.

== Early life and education ==
Tracey was born in the Seattle, United States, where her British mother met her Jamaican father, who was there on a college athletics scholarship. The family lived in Jamaica, and Tracey moved with her mother and sister to Surrey, England when she was 7. Tracey went to school at Camelsdale Primary School in Camelsdale, on the outskirts of Haslemere, as well as St Batholomew's Primary in Haslemere and Midhurst Rother College. Tracey later graduated in sports science from St Mary's University, Twickenham.

Tracey, with six other young British sportspeople, was one of the torchbearers at the 2012 Summer Olympics Opening Ceremony who lit the Olympic Cauldron. She was picked by Kelly Holmes.

== Career ==
=== Great Britain ===
Tracey won the British indoor 800 metres title in 2016, and went on to run a personal best of 2:00.04 on 7 September in Watford (mixed races). At the 2017 World Championships in London, she ran 2:00.28 in her heat to qualify for the semifinals, where she was sixth in 2:00.26. After finishing second in the 800m at the Athletics World Cup in London in July 2018, she went on to improve her 800m best by breaking the two-minute barrier for the first time with 1:59.86 in the semifinals at the European Championships in Berlin, going on to finish fourth in the final.

On 9 November 2019, Adelle set the female course record at Cheltenham parkrun in 16:58.

Tracey won her second national title after indoor 800m victory in 2016, contesting the 1500 metres at the 2022 British Indoor Championships.

Tracey was included in World Class Programme under British Athletics for the years 2016 to 2019.

=== Jamaica ===
In June 2022, Tracey switched her country of allegiance under World Athletics from Great Britain to Jamaica.

At the 2023 World Athletics Championships in Budapest, Tracey reached the semi-final of the 1500m where she set a new Jamaican record but failed to qualify for the final. Later at the Championships, Tracey qualified for the final of the 800m, finishing in 7th in a new personal best of 1:58.41.

In 2024, after finishing 2nd in the 1500m at the Jamaican Championships, Tracey was named in the Jamaican team for the 2024 Paris Olympics, she didn't make it past the repechage round in both the 800m and 1500m.

== Personal life ==
Tracey has both dyslexia and dyscalculia.

== Competition record ==
Year	Competition	Venue	Position	Event	Notes	
Representing Great Britain
2009	European Youth Olympic Festival	Tampere, Finland	2nd place, silver medalist(s)	800 m	2:09.92	
2015	European U23 Championships	Tallinn, Estonia	4th	800 m	2:01.66	
2016	World Indoor Championships	Portland, United States	15th (h)	800 m	2:07.05	
2016	European Championships	Amsterdam, Netherlands	24th (h)	800 m	2:05.41	
2017	World Championships	London, United Kingdom	11th (sf)	800 m	2:00.26	
2017	Universiade	Taipei, Chinese Taipei	5th	800 m	2:03.72	
2018	Commonwealth Games	Gold Coast, Australia	18th (h)	800 m	2:02.03	
2018	World Cup	London, United Kingdom	2nd place, silver medalist(s)	800 m	2:01.05	
2018	European Championships	Berlin, Germany	4th	800 m	2:00.86	
2019	European Indoor Championships	Glasgow, United Kingdom	7th (sf)	800 m	2:03.26	
Representing Jamaica
2022	World Championships	Eugene, United States	12th (sf)	800 m	2:00.21	
2022	World Championships	Eugene, United States	18th (sf)	1500 m	4:06.96	
2022	NACAC Championships	Freeport, Bahamas	3rd place, bronze medalist(s)	800 m	1:59.54	
2022	NACAC Championships	Freeport, Bahamas	2nd place, silver medalist(s)	1500 m	4:08.42	
2023	World Championships	Budapest, Hungary	7th	800m	1:58.41	PB
2023	World Championships	Budapest, Hungary	13th (sf)	1500m	3:58.77	NR
2024	Olympic Games	Paris, France	24th (rep)	800 m	2:03.67	
2024	Olympic Games	Paris, France	22nd (rep)	1500 m	4:14.52	
2025	World Championships	Tokyo, Japan	39th (h)	800 m	2:01.70	
2025	World Championships	Tokyo, Japan	46th (h)	1500 m	4:11.87	
2026	Commonwealth Games	Glasgow, United Kingdom	10th (sf)	800 m	2:01.54	
2026	World Road Running Championships	Copenhagen, Denmark	6th	Road mile	4:29.30	

Olympic Games
Preceded by Catriona Le May Doan, Steve Nash, Nancy Greene and Wayne Gretzky	Final Olympic torchbearer (with Callum Airlie, Jordan Duckitt, Desiree Henry, Katie Kirk, Cameron MacRitchie and Aidan Reynolds); London 2012	Succeeded by Irina Rodnina and Vladislav Tretiak
Preceded by Li Ning	Final Summer Olympic torchbearer (with Callum Airlie, Jordan Duckitt, Desiree Henry, Katie Kirk, Cameron MacRitchie and Aidan Reynolds); London 2012	Succeeded by Vanderlei Cordeiro de Lima
