= Athletics at the 2017 Summer Universiade – Women's 800 metres =

The women's 800 metres event at the 2017 Summer Universiade was held on 23, 24 and 25 August at the Taipei Municipal Stadium.

== Medalists ==
Gold	Silver	Bronze
Rose Mary Almanza; Cuba	Olga Liakhova; Ukraine	Docus Ajok; Uganda

== Results ==
=== Heats ===
Qualification: First 3 in each heat (Q) and next 4 fastest (q) qualified for the semifinals.

Rank	Heat	Name	Nationality	Time	Notes
1	1	Rose Mary Almanza	Cuba	2:03.78	Q
2	1	Docus Ajok	Uganda	2:04.14	Q
3	1	Georgia Griffith	Australia	2:04.17	Q
4	3	Olga Liakhova	Ukraine	2:04.47	Q
5	3	Bianka Kéri	Hungary	2:04.51	Q
6	3	Amela Terzić	Serbia	2:04.51	Q
7	3	Natalia Evangelidou	Cyprus	2:04.56	q
8	1	Irene Baldessari	Italy	2:04.96	q
9	1	Dihia Haddar	Algeria	2:05.07	q, PB
10	4	Adelle Tracey	Great Britain	2:05.78	Q
11	4	Jenna Westaway	Canada	2:05.80	Q
12	4	Christina Hering	Germany	2:05.80	Q
13	3	Rachel Aubry	Canada	2:06.08	q
14	4	Anuscha Nice	South Africa	2:06.38	
15	3	Dagmar Olsen	Denmark	2:08.94	SB
16	4	Louise Jørgensen	Denmark	2:10.59	SB
17	1	Julie Mathisen	Norway	2:10.72	
18	2	Charline Mathias	Luxembourg	2:11.18	Q
19	2	Paulina Mikiewicz-Łapińska	Poland	2:11.43	Q
20	2	Monika Elenska	Lithuania	2:11.69	Q
21	2	Tsepang Sello	Lesotho	2:11.93	
22	2	Kelly Nevolihhin	Estonia	2:11.96	
23	3	Faten Laribi	Algeria	2:12.41	
24	1	Louielyn Pamatian	Philippines	2:17.95	
25	4	Agnes Amuron	Uganda	2:18.95	
26	4	Mariama Kamara	Sierra Leone	2:54.36	
	1	Eva Kavka	Slovenia	DQ	R163.3a
	2	Bertha Maseka	Zambia	DQ	R163.3a
	2	Abike Egbeniyi	Nigeria	DNS	

=== Semifinals ===
Qualification: First 3 in each heat (Q) and the next 2 fastest (q) qualified for the final.

Rank	Heat	Name	Nationality	Time	Notes
1	2	Rose Mary Almanza	Cuba	2:02.22	Q
2	2	Olga Liakhova	Ukraine	2:02.57	Q
3	2	Bianka Kéri	Hungary	2:02.64	Q
4	1	Docus Ajok	Uganda	2:03.13	Q
5	1	Georgia Griffith	Australia	2:03.17	Q
6	2	Paulina Mikiewicz-Łapińska	Poland	2:03.21	q, PB
7	1	Adelle Tracey	Great Britain	2:03.30	Q
8	2	Christina Hering	Germany	2:03.58	q
9	1	Charline Mathias	Luxembourg	2:03.59	
10	1	Natalia Evangelidou	Cyprus	2:03.92	
11	1	Jenna Westaway	Canada	2:04.59	
12	2	Rachel Aubry	Canada	2:04.79	
13	2	Irene Baldessari	Italy	2:05.05	
14	2	Dihia Haddar	Algeria	2:05.46	
15	1	Amela Terzić	Serbia	2:07.54	
16	1	Monika Elenska	Lithuania	2:07.62	

=== Final ===
Rank	Name	Nationality	Time	Notes
1st place, gold medalist(s)	Rose Mary Almanza	Cuba	2:02.21	
2nd place, silver medalist(s)	Olga Liakhova	Ukraine	2:03.11	
3rd place, bronze medalist(s)	Docus Ajok	Uganda	2:03.22	
4	Georgia Griffith	Australia	2:03.52	
5	Adelle Tracey	Great Britain	2:03.72	
6	Bianka Kéri	Hungary	2:04.00	
7	Paulina Mikiewicz-Łapińska	Poland	2:04.19	
8	Christina Hering	Germany	2:04.76	
