= Nataliya Krol =

Ukrainian middle-distance runner

Nataliya Pryshchepa
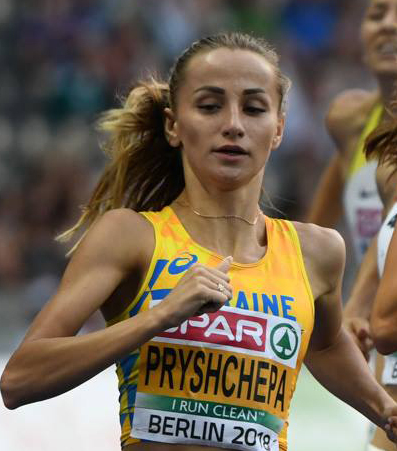
- Pryshchepa in 2018

Personal information
- Nationality: Ukrainian
- Born: 11 September 1994 (age 31) Rivne, Ukraine
- Height: 1.63 m (5 ft 4 in)
- Weight: 48 kg (106 lb)

Sport
- Country: Ukraine
- Sport: Track and field
- Event: Middle-distance running
Medal record
Women's athletics
Representing Ukraine
European Games
Gold medal – first place	2019 Minsk	Team event
Gold medal – first place	2023 Kraków–Małopolska	800 m
European Championships
Gold medal – first place	2016 Amsterdam	800 m
Gold medal – first place	2018 Berlin	800 m
Military World Games
Gold medal – first place	2019 Wuhan	800 m
Silver medal – second place	2019 Wuhan	1500 m
European Team Championships
Bronze medal – third place	2014 Braunschweig	1500 m
Bronze medal – third place	2017 Lille	1500 m
European Athletics U23 Championships
Bronze medal – third place	2015 Tallinn	1500 m
European Athletics U20 Championships
Gold medal – first place	2013 Rieti	1500 m
Representing Europe
IAAF Continental Cup
Silver medal – second place	2018 Ostrava	Team competition

Nataliia Krol, born Nataliya Oleksandrivna Pryshchepa (Ukrainian: Наталія Олександрівна Прище́па; born 11 September 1994) is a Ukrainian athlete who specialises in middle-distance running. She is a two-time European champion and European Games champion.

== Career ==
Pryshchepa won the 1500 metres event at the 2013 European Junior Championships and the bronze medal in the 1500 m at the 2015 European U23 Championships. She won the gold medal in the 800 metres event at the 2016 and 2018 European Championships.

In November 2019, Pryshchepa married kickboxer Roman Krol, changing her name to Nataliya Krol.

In February 2020, she received a provisional suspension after a positive test for doping. In August, she received a 20-months suspension taking effect on 16 January 2020, without being stripped from her two European titles.

== Personal bests ==
=== Outdoor ===
Event	Record	Venue	Date
800 metres	1:58.60	Zurich	1 September 2016
1500 metres	4:06.29	Tallinn	12 July 2015
