= Nicky van Leuveren =

Dutch sprinter

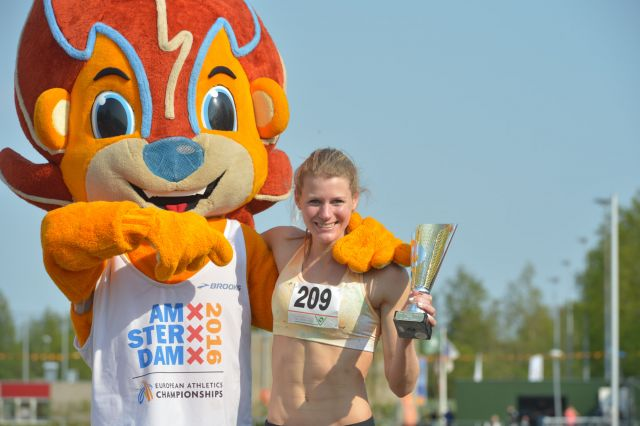
- During Ter Specke Bokaal 2016

Personal information
- Nationality: Dutch
- Born: 20 May 1990 (age 35)
- Height: 1.75 m (5 ft 9 in)
- Weight: 58 kg (128 lb)

Sport
- Sport: Track and field
- Event: 400m

Nicky van Leuveren (born 20 May 1990) is a Dutch sprinter. She competed in the 400 metres event at the 2014 IAAF World Indoor Championships.
