= Anna Silvander =

Swedish middle-distance runner

Personal information
- Born: 22 June 1993 (age 32)

Sport
- Sport: Athletics
- Event(s): 800 m, 1500 m
- Club: IFK Lidingö

Anna Silvander (born 22 June 1993) is a Swedish middle-distance runner. She represented her country at two outdoor and three indoor European Championships.

== International competitions ==
Year	Competition	Venue	Position	Event	Notes
Representing Sweden
2015	European Indoor Championships	Prague, Czech Republic	4th (sf)	800 m	2:04.24
2015	European U23 Championships	Tallinn, Estonia	5th	1500 m	2:02.53
2016	European Championships	Amsterdam, Netherlands	22nd (sf)	800 m	2:03.37
2017	European Indoor Championships	Belgrade, Serbia	12th (h)	800 m	2:05.63
2018	European Championships	Berlin, Germany	20th (h)	1500 m	4:12.61
2019	European Indoor Championships	Glasgow, United Kingdom	9th (h)	1500 m	4:11.92

== Personal bests ==
Outdoor

- 800 metres – 2:02.53 (Tallinn 2015)
- 1000 metres – 2:37.78 (Gothenburg 2016)
- 1500 metres – 4:11.23 (Ninove 2018)

Indoor

- 800 metres – 2:02.54 (Boston 2017)
- 1500 metres – 4:11.01 (Glasgow 2019)
