= Irene Baldessari =

Italian middle-distance runner

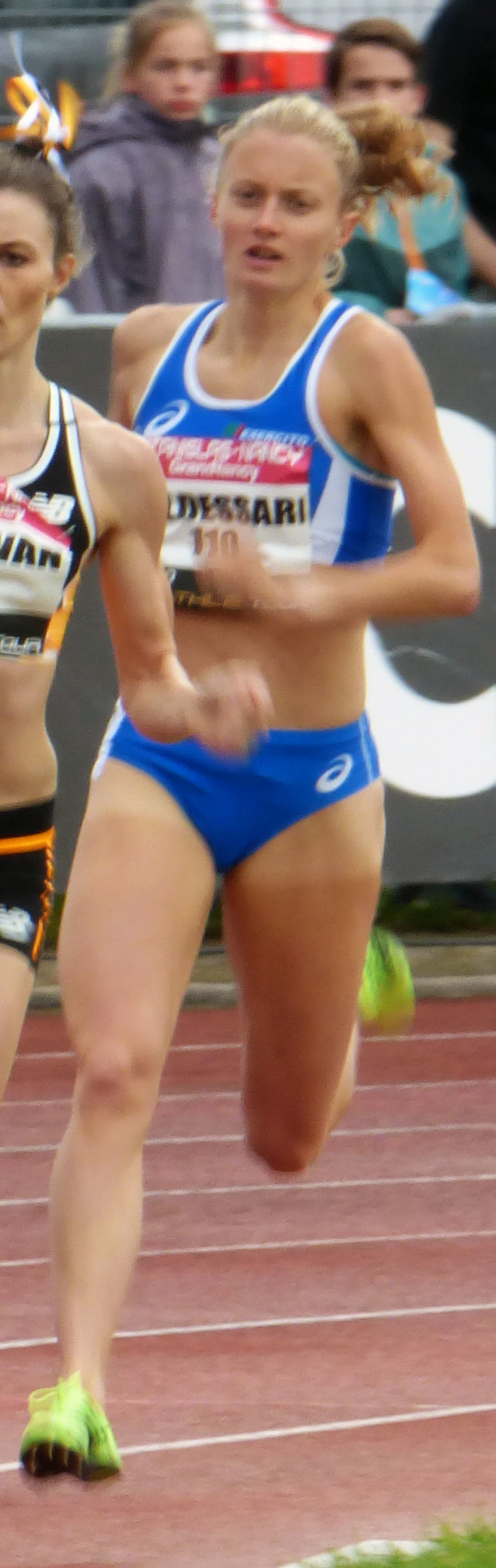
- Baldessari in 2016.

Personal information
- National team: Italy (5 caps)
- Born: 21 January 1993 (age 33) Trento, Italy
- Height: 1.64 m (5 ft 5 in)
- Weight: 50 kg (110 lb)

Sport
- Country: Italy
- Sport: Athletics
- Event: Middle-distance running
- Club: G.S. Esercito
- Coached by: Gianni Ghidini, Franco Baldessari

Achievements and titles
- Personal bests: 800 m: 2:02.47 (2018); 800 m indoor: 2:02.71 (2021)
Medal record
Mediterranean U23 Championships
Bronze medal – third place	2014 Aubagne	800 m

Irene Baldessari (born 18 January 1993) is an Italian middle-distance runner who won two national titles at senior level.

== Biography ==
At international youth level she won gold medal at the 2014 Mediterranean Athletics U23 Championships.

== Achievements ==
Year	Competition	Venue	Position	Event	Time	Notes
2016	European Championships	(Netherlands) Amsterdam	Heat	800 m	2:06.15	
2017	Universiade	(Taiwan) Taipei	Semifinal	800 m	2:05.05	
2021	European Indoor Championships	(Poland) Toruń	Semifinal	800 m	2:05.44	

== National titles ==
- Italian Athletics Championships
  - 800 m: 2018
- Italian Athletics Indoor Championships
  - 800 m: 2017
