= Anastasiya Tkachuk =

Ukrainian middle-distance runner (born 1993)

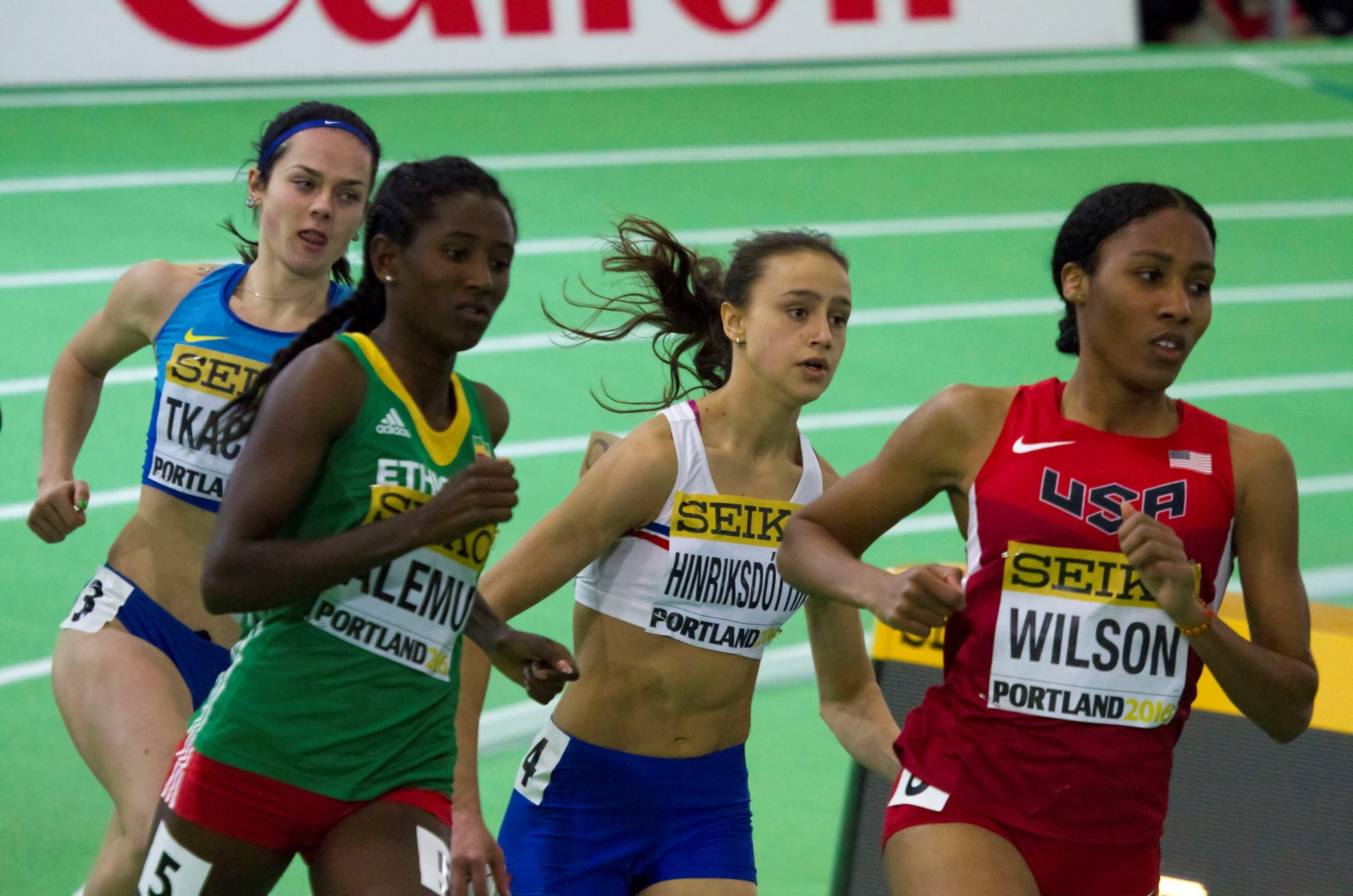
- Tkachuk (left) at the 2016 IAAF World Indoor Championships

Personal information
- Born: 20 April 1993 (age 33)

Sport
- Country: Ukraine
- Sport: Track and field
- Event: 800 metres
Medal record
Women's athletics
Representing Ukraine
European U20 Championships
Gold medal – first place	2011 Tallinn	800 m
European U23 Championships
Silver medal – second place	2015 Tallinn	800 m
European Team Championships
Bronze medal – third place	2015 Cheboksary	800 m

Anastasiya Tkachuk (born 20 April 1993) is a Ukrainian middle-distance runner. She competed in the 800 metres event at the 2015 World Championships in Athletics in Beijing, China.
