= Zerei Kbrom Mezngi =

Norwegian runner (born 1986)

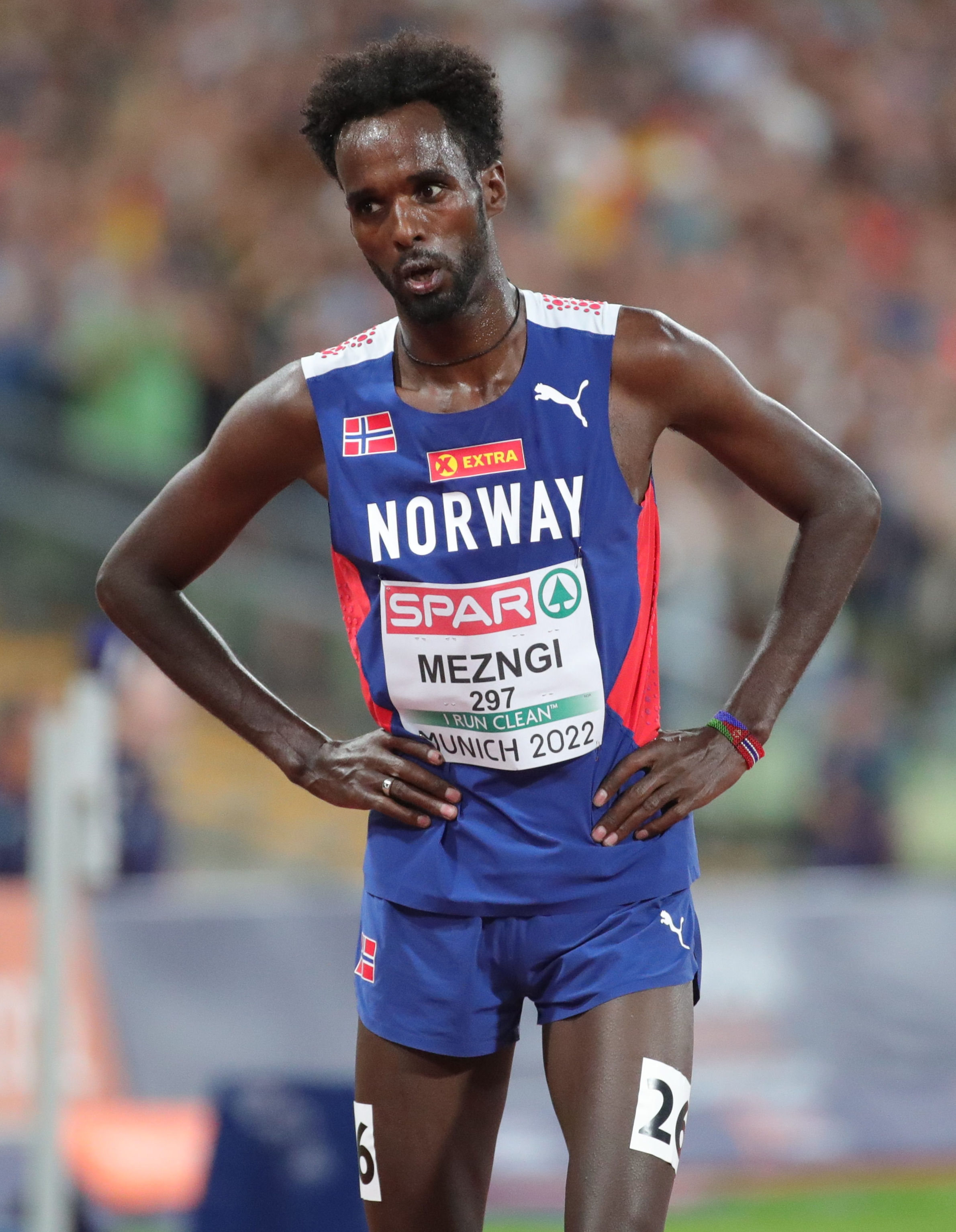
- Mezngi in 2022

Personal information
- Born: 12 January 1986 (age 40) Eritrea

Sport
- Sport: Athletics
- Event: 10,000 m

Achievements and titles
- Personal bests: 3000 m: 7:47.16 (Oslo 2021); 5000 m: 13:37.59 (Oslo 2020); 10,000 m: 27:46.94 (Munich 2022); 10km: 27:39 (Valencia 2021) NR; Half marathon: 1:00:07 (København 2021); Marathon: 2:07:10 (Valencia 2022)
Medal record
Men's athletics
Representing Norway
European Championships
Silver medal – second place	2022 Munich	10,000 m

Zerei Kbrom Mezngi (born 12 January 1986) is an Eritrean-Norwegian long-distance runner. Competing for Norway, he won a silver medal in the 10000 meters at the 2022 European Athletics Championships.

== Personal life ==
Born in Eritrea on 12 January 1986, Mezngi came to Norway as a refugee in 2012. Settling in Tananger from 2017, he became a naturalized Norwegian citizen in 2020. He has represented Norway internationally since 2021.
