= Weldu Negash Gebretsadik =

Norwegian long-distance runner

Personal information
- Nationality: Norwegian
- Born: 12 November 1986 (age 38) Mekelle

Sport
- Sport: Athletics
- Event: Marathon
- Club: IL i BUL

Weldu Negash Gebretsadik (born 12 November 1986) is a Norwegian athlete competing in long-distance events. Representing Norway at the 2019 World Athletics Championships, he competed in men's marathon. He finished in 24th place.

In 2018, he competed in the men's marathon at the 2018 European Athletics Championships held in Berlin, Germany. He did not finish his race.
