= Norway at the 2006 European Athletics Championships =

Sporting event delegation

Norway sent a squad of 29 athletes to the 2006 European Athletics Championships. They won 1 gold and 1 silver medal. The squad included one former medallist at an international championship, Andreas Thorkildsen, but it was long-distance runner Susanne Wigene who took Norway's first medal when she ran in to take the silver medal on the 10,000 metres, a second behind the winner, and the third best time by any Norwegian female runner.

== Results ==
2006 Gothenburg	Gold	Silver	Bronze	Total
Norway (NOR)	1	1	0	2

Place	Athlete	Event	Result
1	Andreas Thorkildsen	Javelin M	88.78
2	Susanne Wigene	10,000 m W	30:32.36 PB
4	Kjersti Plätzer	20 km walk W	1:28:45
4	Trond Nymark	50 km walk M	3:44:17
7	Erik Tysse	20 km walk M	1:22:13
7	Susanne Wigene	5000 m W	15:11.79
13	Martin Rypdal; John Ertzgaard; Christian Mogstad; Andreas Kristiansen	4 × 100 m relay M	40.36
13	Morten Sand; Lars Eric Sæther; Quincy Douglas; Steffen Kjønnås	4 × 400 m relay M	3:07.65
13	Kirsten Melkevik Otterbu	Marathon W	2:35:59 SB
16	Grete Etholm Snyder	Discus W	54.44
17	Elisabeth Slettum	200 m W	23.55 PB
19	Ragnhild Kvarberg	1500 m W	4:12.85
21	Ronny Nilsen	Javelin M	71.37
23	Bjørnar Ustad Kristensen	3000 m steeplechase M	8:53.93
24	Mona Holm	Hammer W	62.65
25	Bård Kvalheim	1500 m M	3:49.55
29	Martin Rypdal	100 m M	Rd2: 10.66; Rd1: 10.52
31	Henrik Sandstad	Marathon M	2:22:10
34	John Ertzgaard	100 m M	Rd1: 10.62
35	Trond Idland	Marathon M	2:26:23
38	Karl Johan Rasmussen	Marathon M	2:30:05
	Anne Gerd Eieland	High jump W	no result
	Marius Bakken	5000 m M	DNF in final
	Hans Olav Uldal	Decathlon M	DNF
