= List of flag bearers for Jamaica at the Olympics =

Jamaica at the Olympics
- IOC code: JAM
- NOC: Jamaica Olympic Association
- Website: www.teamja.org
- Medals: Gold 27 Silver 39 Bronze 28 Total 94

Summer appearances
- 1948; 1952; 1956; 1960; 1964; 1968; 1972; 1976; 1980; 1984; 1988; 1992; 1996; 2000; 2004; 2008; 2012; 2016; 2020; 2024

Winter appearances
- 1988; 1992; 1994; 1998; 2002; 2006; 2010; 2014; 2018; 2022; 2026

Other related appearances
- British West Indies (1960 S)

This is a list of flag bearers who have represented Jamaica at the Olympics.

Flag bearers carry the national flag of their country at the opening ceremony of the Olympic Games.

#	Event year	Season	Flag bearer	Sport
1	1952	Summer	Arthur Wint	Athletics
2	1972	Summer	Lennox Miller	Athletics
3	1976	Summer	Don Quarrie	Athletics
4	1984	Summer	Bert Cameron	Athletics
5	1988	Winter	Dudley Stokes	Bobsleigh
6	1988	Summer	Merlene Ottey	Athletics
7	1992	Winter	Dudley Stokes	Bobsleigh
8	1992	Summer	Merlene Ottey	Athletics
9	1994	Winter	Chris Stokes	Bobsleigh
10	1996	Summer	Juliet Cuthbert	Athletics
11	1998	Winter	Ricky McIntosh	Bobsleigh
12	2000	Summer	Deon Hemmings	Athletics
13	2002	Winter	Winston Watts	Bobsleigh
14	2004	Summer	Sandie Richards	Athletics
15	2008	Summer	Veronica Campbell-Brown	Athletics
16	2010	Winter	Errol Kerr	Freestyle skiing
17	2012	Summer	Usain Bolt	Athletics
18	2014	Winter	Marvin Dixon	Bobsleigh
19	2016	Summer	Shelly-Ann Fraser-Pryce	Athletics
20	2018	Winter	Audra Segree	Bobsleigh
21	2020	Summer	Ricardo Brown	Boxing
21	2020	Summer	Shelly-Ann Fraser-Pryce	Athletics
22	2022	Winter	Benjamin Alexander	Alpine skiing
22	2022	Winter	Jazmine Fenlator-Victorian	Bobsleigh
23	2024	Summer	Josh Kirlew	Swimming
23	2024	Summer	Shanieka Ricketts	Athletics

== See also ==
- Jamaica at the Olympics
