= Jamaica at the 1998 Winter Olympics =

- Flag of Jamaica
- IOC code: JAM
- NOC: Jamaica Olympic Association
- Website: www.joa.org.jm

in Nagano, Japan 7–22 February 1998
- Competitors: 6 (6 men and 0 women) in 1 sport
- Flag bearer: Ricky McIntosh
- Medals: Gold 0 Silver 0 Bronze 0 Total 0

Winter Olympics appearances (overview)
- 1988; 1992; 1994; 1998; 2002; 2006; 2010; 2014; 2018; 2022; 2026

Jamaica competed at the 1998 Winter Olympics in Nagano, Japan, from 7 to 22 February 1998. It was the country's fourth consecutive appearance at the Winter Olympics, since its debut at the 1988 Winter Olympics in Calgary. The Jamaican delegation consisted of six male athletes competing in one sport. It did not win any medals at the Games.

== Background ==
The Jamaica Olympic Association was recognized by the International Olympic Committee (IOC) in 1936. Jamaica made its Olympic debut at the 1948 Summer Olympics held in London, and has since participated in every Summer Olympics. However, it made its first Winter Olympics appearance only at the 1988 Winter Olympics in Calgary, and the 1998 Winter Olympics was the country's fourth consecutive appearance at the Winter Olympics.

The 1998 Winter Olympics was held in Nagano, Japan, between 7 and 22 February 1998. Bobsleigh athlete Ricky McIntosh served as Jamaica's flagbearer during the opening ceremony on 7 February 1998. Jamaica did not win a medal at the Games.

== Competitors ==
The Jamaican team consisted of six male athletes competing in one sport.

Sport	Men	Women	Total
Bobsleigh	6	0	6
Total	6	0	6

== Bobsleigh ==
Jamaica qualified two sleds for the bobsleigh events at the 1998 Winter Olympics: one for the men's two-man event and one for the men's four-man event. This was Jamaica's fourth consecutive participation in the bobsleigh event at the Winter Olympics since it made its debut at the 1988 Winter Olympics. Both events were held at the Spiral, the first artificially refrigerated track in Asia, located in Iizuna, north of Nagano.

=== Two-man ===
The two-man event was held on 14 and 15 February 1998. Jamaica was represented by pilot Devon Harris and brakeman Michael Morgan. Harris had been part of the Jamaica's bobsleigh team at the 1988 and 1992 Winter Olympics and was competing at his third and final Winter Olympics. Morgan was making his Olympics debut at the event. Harris and Morgan finished 29th out of the 38 competing teams with a combined time of 3:45.74 across their four runs.

=== Four-man ===
The four-man event was held on 20 and 21 February 1998. Due to poor weather conditions on the first day of competition, the scheduled second run was cancelled, and the competition comprised only three runs in total instead of the usual four. Jamaica was represented by pilot Dudley Stokes, pushers Winston Watts and Chris Stokes, and brakeman Wayne Thomas. This was the same four-man crew that had competed for Jamaica at the 1994 Winter Olympics in Lillehammer and finished 14th, the best ever finish for Jamaica. Dudley Stokes, who was born in Turks and Caicos Islands, and his brother Chris, have been part of the Jamaican bobsled team since its debut at the 1988 Olympics, and were competing in their fourth consecutive Games. It was also the final Olympic appearance for the brothers. Thomas and Watts were competing in their second Olympics. The crew set a time of just over 54 seconds in each of their three runs, and finished 21st out of 31 competing teams with a combined time of 2:43.76 across their three runs.

Athletes	Event	Run 1		Run 2		Run 3		Run 4		Total	
Athletes	Event	Time	Rank	Time	Rank	Time	Rank	Time	Rank	Time	Rank
Devon Harris*; Michael Morgan	Two-man	0:56.56	30	0:56.52	30	0:56.36	30	0:56.30	29	3:45.74	29
Dudley Stokes*; Winston Watts; Chris Stokes; Wayne Thomas	Four-man	0:54.41	21	0:54.55	22	0:54.80	21	Run cancelled		2:43.76	21

* – Denotes the driver of each sled

== See also ==
- Tropical nations at the Winter Olympics
