= Jamaica at the 1992 Winter Olympics =

- IOC code: JAM
- NOC: Jamaica Olympic Association
- Website: www.joa.org.jm

in Albertville
- Competitors: 5 (men) in 1 sport
- Flag bearer: Dudley Stokes (bobsleigh)
- Medals: Gold 0 Silver 0 Bronze 0 Total 0

Winter Olympics appearances (overview)
- 1988; 1992; 1994; 1998; 2002; 2006; 2010; 2014; 2018; 2022; 2026

Jamaica competed at the 1992 Winter Olympics in Albertville, France, from 8 to 23 February 1992. It was the country's second consecutive appearance at the Winter Olympics, since its debut at the previous 1988 Winter Olympics in Calgary. The Jamaican delegation consisted of five male athletes competing in one sport. It did not win any medals at the Games.

== Background ==
The Jamaica Olympic Association was recognized by the International Olympic Committee (IOC) in 1936. Jamaica made its Olympic debut at the 1948 Summer Olympics held in London, and has since participated in every Summer Olympics. However, it made its first Winter Olympics appearance only at the 1988 Winter Olympics in Calgary four years ago, and the 1992 Winter Olympics was the country's second consecutive appearance at the Winter Olympics.

The 1992 Winter Olympics was held in Albertville, France, from 8 to 23 February 1992. Bobsleigh athlete Dudley Stokes served as Jamaica's flagbearer during the opening ceremony. Jamaica did not win a medal at the Games.

== Competitors ==
The Jamaican team consisted of five male athletes competing in one sport.

Sport	Men	Women	Total
Bobsleigh	5	–	5
Total	5	0	5

== Bobsleigh ==
Jamaica qualified three sleds for the bobsleigh events at the 1992 Winter Olympics: two for the men's two-man event and one for the men's four-man event. This was Jamaica's second consecutive participation in the bobsleigh event at the Winter Olympics since it made its debut at the 1988 Winter Olympics four years ago. Both events were held at the Piste de Bobsleigh et Luge in the neighbouring village of La Plagne. The 1.507 km (0.936 mi)-long track opened in 1990 and has a vertical drop of 124 m (407 ft) at an average gradient of 8.29%.

=== Participants ===
Dudley Stokes, Chris Stokes, and Ricky McIntosh were part of both the two-man and four-man events, while Devon Harris and Michael White competed only in the two-man and four-man event respectively. Dudley Stokes, who was born in Turks and Caicos Islands, and his brother Chris, have been part of the Jamaican bobsled team since its debut at the 1988 Olympics, and were competing in their second consecutive Games. Harris and White had been part of the Jamaica's bobsleigh team at the 1988 Olympics and were also competing at their second Winter Olympics. McIntosh made his debut at the Winter Olympics.

=== Two-man ===
The two-man event was held on 15 and 16 February 1992. The Stokes' brothers competing in the first sled were ranked 37th out of the 43 sleds after the first and second runs. Though they improved marginally in the next two runs, they finished in 36th overall. In the second sled, Harris and McIntosh, who were ranked 34th after the first run with a time of 1:02.57, improved to 33rd after the second run. However, they had poorer third and fourth runs, and were eventually classified in 35th, a place above the Stokes' brothers.

Sled	Athletes	Event	Run 1		Run 2		Run 3		Run 4		Total	
Sled	Athletes	Event	Time	Rank	Time	Rank	Time	Rank	Time	Rank	Time	Rank
JAM-1	Dudley Stokes; Chris Stokes	Two-man	1:02.93	37	1:03.30	37	1:03.38	36	1:03.15	36	4:12.76	36
JAM-2	Devon Harris; Ricky McIntosh	Two-man	1:02.57	34	1:02.88	33	1:03.13	35	1:03.10	35	4:11.68	35

=== Four-man ===
The four-man event was held on 21 and 22 February 1992. The crew set their best time of 1:00.12 in the first run and were classified 25th out of the 31 teams. However, they dropped to 27th in the second run, with a time of 1 minute and 0.48 seconds. Though they improved to 24th and 25th in the third and final runs respectively, the team finished 25th in the overall standings with a combined time of 4:01.37 across their four runs.

Sled	Athletes	Event	Run 1		Run 2		Run 3		Run 4		Total	
Sled	Athletes	Event	Time	Rank	Time	Rank	Time	Rank	Time	Rank	Time	Rank
JAM-1	Dudley Stokes; Ricky McIntosh; Michael White; Chris Stokes	Four-man	1:00.12	25	1:00.48	27	1:00.38	24	1:00.39	25	4:01.37	25
