= Nations not competing at the 2006 Winter Olympics =

Some countries hoped to compete in the 2006 Winter Olympics but did not do so.

== Iraq ==
Flag of Iraq

Faisal Faisal failed to qualify for skeleton.

Iraq has never competed at a Winter Olympics.

== Jamaica ==
Flag of Jamaica

Jamaica did not send any athletes to the 2006 Winter Olympics. Jamaica's bobsleigh team—Led by Chris Stokes, and coached by Wayne Thomas— failed to qualify for the Games. However, former Jamaican bobsledder Lascelles Brown, who was born in Jamaica, and obtained Canadian citizenship in January 2006 by parliamentary decree, participated with Pierre Lueders in the 2-man and 4-man events and won Silver in the 2-man, and finished 4th in the 4-man.

Jamaica has competed in every other Winter Olympics from 1988 through 2026.

== Mexico ==
Flag of Mexico

Mexico did not send any athletes to the 2006 Winter Olympics. The teams for bobsleigh and skeleton both failed to qualify for the Games. Alpine skier Hubertus von Hohenlohe had gained enough FIS points to qualify for the Olympics, but the Mexican Olympic Committee decided not to send a one-man team to the Games.

von Hohenlohe lobbied strenuously to get to go to what would be his fifth Games, with support from the Turin Committee, the Italian National Olympic Committee (CONI), the IOC, and FIS.

== Morocco ==
Flag of Morocco

Morocco qualified to participate at the 2006 Winter Olympics, in Turin, Italy with the representation by Samir Azzimani (who lives in France) and Sarah Ben Mansour (who lives in Belgium), both in alpine skiing. However, they did not appear on the start list at the event.

Eighteen-year-old Ben Mansour was born outside Antwerp and trains in Flanders. The man-made indoor slope (coincidentally named the Casablanca Ski Centre) that she practices on is small compared to the majestic training grounds of the traditional skiing powers and involves countless numbers of short runs. Ben Mansour has a Belgian father and Moroccan mother, speaks Arabic, and grew up immersed in Muslim culture. Her total African skiing experience is limited to just two days in Morocco's Atlas Mountains, where she gave demonstrations to locals. Ben Mansour reportedly had to cancel because of a knee surgery.

== Pakistan ==
Flag of Pakistan

Pakistan was scheduled to send 2 alpine skiers to the 2006 Winter Olympics in Turin, Italy. However, both Muhammed Abbas and Waseem Abbas failed to qualify.

== Peru ==
Flag of Peru

Peru had intended to participate in the Winter Olympic Games for the first time in its history, but failed to appear for the Opening Ceremony, and the four snowboarders failed to register for their events.

== Virgin Islands ==
Flag of the Virgin Islands

The United States Virgin Islands sent one competitor, Anne Abernathy, for the women's singles Luge competition; however, she injured her wrist during a crash in practice and was unable to compete.
