= Winston Watts =

Jamaican bobsledder

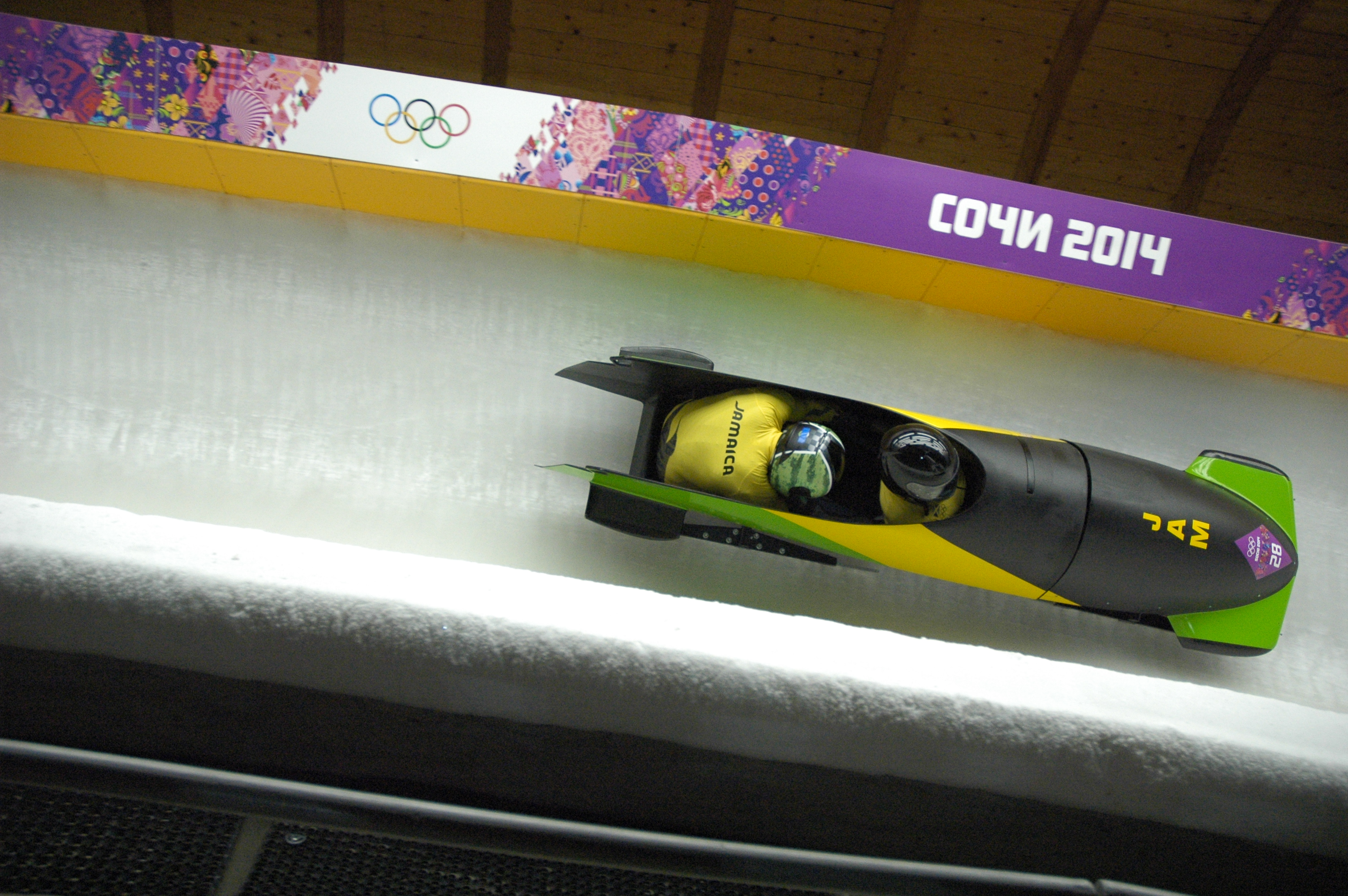
- Watts at the 2014 Winter Olympics

Personal information
- Born: December 8, 1967 (age 58) May Pen, Clarendon Parish, Jamaica
- Height: 6 ft 0 in (183 cm)
- Weight: 236 lb (107 kg)

Sport
- Country: Jamaica
- Sport: Bobsleigh

Winston Alexander Watts (born 8 December 1967) is a member of the Jamaica national bobsleigh team. He has competed in four Olympics, most recently the 2014 Winter Olympics in Sochi.

Watts has five children - Neecia Watts, Remonia Watts, Romain Watts, Shauna Kaye Watts, and Winston Watts Jr.

== Olympics ==
Watts first appearance at the Winter Olympics came during the 1994 Games held in Lillehammer, Norway. Competing in the four-man event alongside teammates Dudley Stokes, Nelson Stokes and Wayne Thomas, Watts finished in 14th position in a time of 3 minutes 29.96 seconds.

At the 1998 Winter Olympics held in Nagano, Japan, the same Jamaican quartet finished in 21st position in the four-man event with a combined time of 2 minutes 43.76 seconds.

For the 2002 Winter Olympics in Salt Lake City, Utah, United States, Watts switched to the two-man bobsled event. Competing alongside brakeman Lascelles Brown, the Jamaican pair set a new Olympic push-start record of 4.78 seconds. Watts and Brown finished 28th out of the 37 competing teams in a time of 3 minutes 14.94 seconds.

Watts retired from the sport as Jamaican teams failed to qualify for the 2006 Games in Turin, Italy, and the 2010 games in Vancouver, Canada. During his retirement, Watts moved to Evanston, Wyoming, United States, to work in the oil fields. In 2010 he came out of retirement at the age of 43 with the aim of qualifying for the 2014 Winter Olympics in Sochi, Russia.

For the 2013-2014 season Watts teamed up with compatriot Marvin Dixon and based himself in Utah to allow the pair to compete in the North American Cup. They obtained enough points to qualify for the 2014 Olympics by taking part in lower-tier events at tracks in Park City, Utah; Lake Placid, New York; and Calgary.

Funding for Watts and Dixon to compete in Sochi was provided by Jamaica Olympic Association and Sochi 2014 Olympic and Paralympic Organizing Committee. To raise additional money for equipment the pair started an online funding appeal with users of the website Reddit donating over US$25000 via the cryptocurrency Dogecoin. Further money was raised via Crowtilt, a crowdfunding website.

Watts and Dixon finished 29th out of the 30 competing teams in the two-man event in Sochi with a combined time of 2 minutes 55.40 seconds for their three runs. During their second run Watts suffered an issue with his visor that nearly resulted in the sled overturning.

== See also ==
- Jamaica at the 1994 Winter Olympics
- Jamaica at the 1998 Winter Olympics
- Jamaica at the 2002 Winter Olympics
- Jamaica at the 2014 Winter Olympics

Olympic Games
Preceded by Deon Hemmings	Flag bearer for Jamaica; Salt Lake 2002	Succeeded by Sandie Richards
