= Jamaica at the 1994 Winter Olympics =

- Flag of Jamaica
- IOC code: JAM
- NOC: Jamaica Olympic Association
- Website: www.joa.org.jm

in Lillehammer, Norway 12–27 February 1994
- Competitors: 4 (4 men and 0 women) in 1 sport
- Flag bearer: Chris Stokes
- Medals: Gold 0 Silver 0 Bronze 0 Total 0

Winter Olympics appearances (overview)
- 1988; 1992; 1994; 1998; 2002; 2006; 2010; 2014; 2018; 2022; 2026

Jamaica competed at the 1994 Winter Olympics in Lillehammer, Norway, from 12 to 27 February 1994. It was the country's third consecutive appearance at the Winter Olympics, since its debut at the 1988 Winter Olympics in Calgary. The Jamaican delegation consisted of four male athletes competing in one sport. It did not win any medals at the Games.

== Background ==
The Jamaica Olympic Association was recognized by the International Olympic Committee (IOC) in 1936. Jamaica made its Olympic debut at the 1948 Summer Olympics held in London, and has since participated in every Summer Olympics. However, it made its first Winter Olympics appearance only at the 1988 Winter Olympics in Calgary, and the 1994 Winter Olympics was the country's third consecutive appearance at the Winter Olympics.

The 1994 Winter Olympics was held in Lillehammer, Norway, between 12 and 27 February 1994. Bobsleigh athlete Chris Stokes served as Jamaica's flagbearer during the opening ceremony on 12 February 1994. Jamaica did not win a medal at the Games.

== Competitors ==
The Jamaican team consisted of four male athletes competing in one sport.

Sport	Men	Women	Total
Bobsleigh	4	0	4
Total	4	0	4

== Bobsleigh ==
Jamaica qualified two sleds for the bobsleigh events at the 1994 Winter Olympics: one for the men's two-man event and one for the men's four-man event. This was Jamaica's third consecutive participation in the bobsleigh event at the Winter Olympics since it made its debut at the 1988 Winter Olympics. The bobsleigh events were held at Olympiske Bob-og Akebane at Hunderfossen, located about 15 km (9.3 mi) north of Lillehammer. The 1.395 km (0.867 mi)-long track was completed in 1991 and has a vertical drop of 114 m (374 ft) and an average gradient of 8.5%.

=== Participants ===
Dudley Stokes and Wayne Thomas were part of both the two-man and four-man teams, while Winston Watts and Chris Stokes completed the Jamaican lineup for the four-man event. Dudley Stokes, who was born in Turks and Caicos Islands, and his brother Chris, have been part of the Jamaican bobsled team since its debut at the 1988 Olympics, and were competing in their third consecutive Games. Thomas and Watts made their debut at the Winter Olympics.

=== Two-man ===
The two-man event was held on 19 and 20 February 1994. Stokes and Thomas were ranked 25th out of the 43 sleds after the first turn with a time of 53.59 seconds. Though they took slightly longer to complete the course in the second and third runs, they were placed one better at 24th in both the runs. However, the team did not complete the fourth and final run, and were eventually the only team that was not classified in the final standings.

=== Four-man ===
The four-man event was held on 26 and 27 February 1994. The crew set a time of 52.5 and 52.56 seconds in their first two runs respectively to be classified 18th out of the 30 sleds. In the third run, they improved to 52.39 seconds and were ranked in the top ten. Though they took longer to complete the course in the fourth and final run, they finished 10th in the standings. With a combined time of 3:29.96 across their four runs, the team finished 14th in the overall standings. This was the best ever finish for Jamaica in the bobsleigh events at the Winter Olympics.

Sled	Athletes	Event	Run 1		Run 2		Run 3		Run 4		Total	
Sled	Athletes	Event	Time	Rank	Time	Rank	Time	Rank	Time	Rank	Time	Rank
JAM-1	Dudley Stokes*; Wayne Thomas	Two-man	53.59	25	53.81	24	53.76	24	—	DNF	—	DQ

Sled	Athletes	Event	Run 1		Run 2		Run 3		Run 4		Total	
Sled	Athletes	Event	Time	Rank	Time	Rank	Time	Rank	Time	Rank	Time	Rank
JAM-1	Dudley Stokes*; Winston Watt; Chris Stokes; Wayne Thomas	Four-man	52.50	18	52.56	18	52.39	10	52.51	10	3:29.96	14

* – Denotes the driver of each sled

== See also ==
- Tropical nations at the Winter Olympics
