= Jamaica at the 1988 Winter Olympics =

- IOC code: JAM
- NOC: Jamaica Olympic Association
- Website: www.joa.org.jm

in Calgary
- Competitors: 4 (men) in 1 sport
- Flag bearer: Dudley Stokes
- Medals: Gold 0 Silver 0 Bronze 0 Total 0

Winter Olympics appearances (overview)
- 1988; 1992; 1994; 1998; 2002; 2006; 2010; 2014; 2018; 2022; 2026

Jamaica competed in the Winter Olympic Games for the first time at the 1988 Winter Olympics in Calgary, Alberta, Canada. They competed in one sport, bobsledding, in both the two-man and four-man events and finished outside the medal places in both competitions. Athletes were recruited from the Jamaica Defence Force, which saw Dudley Stokes, Devon Harris, and Michael White become the first members of the team. Caswell Allen was the fourth man, but was injured prior to the start of the Olympics and was replaced by Chris Stokes, who was only in Canada to support his brother and new teammate Dudley.

The two-man event took place first, with Dudley Stokes and White finishing in 30th position overall. American television stations aired footage of the four-man Jamaican team, which crashed during the third run and finished in last place. Their participation went on to inspire the 1993 film Cool Runnings.

== Background ==
The Jamaica Olympic Association was formed in 1936, but due to the cancellation of the 1940 and 1944 Olympics due to the Second World War, the first Games they competed in was the 1948 Summer Olympics in London. They have appeared at every Summer Games since, including at the 1960 Games in which they appeared as part of the combined team of the British West Indies. They have won medals at every Summer Games they have competed at, with the exception of the 1956 and 1964 Summer Olympics.

== Competitors ==
The following is the list of number of competitors in the Games.

Sport	Men	Women	Total
Bobsleigh	4	–	4
Total	4	0	4

== Bobsleigh ==
George B. Fitch, who was the Commercial Attaché for the American embassy in Kingston from 1985 to 1986, suggested that Jamaica should begin competing in the Winter Olympics and is quoted as saying, "You got great athletes and a great athlete should be able to do any sport." After seeing a local pushcart derby, Fitch and businessman William Maloney proposed the idea of a Jamaican bobsleigh team, as it played well to the strengths of Jamaicans in sprinting. The President of the Jamaica Olympic Association at the time supported the idea, and so preparations were made to hire athletes. Advertisements were placed describing "dangerous and rigorous" trials which would form the basis of the country's first bobsleigh team. However, recruitment proved to be problematic, so the Jamaica Defence Force was asked for volunteers. This resulted in the first team of Dudley Stokes, Devon Harris, and Michael White. These three were selected as part of the team in October 1987, with teammate Caswell Allen added later.

With funding provided by Fitch and the Jamaica Tourist Board, training was conducted in Canada and Austria in preparation for the 1988 Winter Olympics. Sepp Haidacher was recruited as a coach, and the team began to be featured in North American media with a comical angle. An agreement was reached with the Fédération Internationale de Bobsleigh et de Tobogganing in order to allow for entrance in both the four-man and the two-man events at the Games. Once in Calgary, the team conducted test runs on a frozen lake in order to get used to the conditions, but Allen fell and was injured. Chris Stokes, who was only in Canada in order to support his brother Dudley, was added to the four-man team three days before the first run having never been in a bobsleigh before.

The first event which Jamaica competed in was the two-man bobsleigh, where Dudley Stokes and Michael White became Jamaica's first Winter Olympians. In their first run, they finished in 34th position, ahead of the second New Zealand team, and both of the pairs from Portugal, U.S. Virgin Islands and Mexico. They improved in the second run, moving up to 22nd place, but were in 31st place on the third run and finished only one place higher in 30th place during the fourth and final run. Overall the duo finished in 30th place out of the 41 teams competing.

Following the elimination of the United States ice hockey team, American television stations needed to fill airtime and chose to focus on the Jamaican bobsleigh team in the four-man event. The first run ended poorly, as when Dudley Stokes jumped into the bobsleigh, the push-bar in the sleigh broke, resulting in the team coming in third from last in 24th place. On their second attempt, the team ranked second to last, due in part to White struggling to crouch down properly in his seat, remaining almost upright through the first corner.

It was the events of the third run for which the team became best known. Stokes injured his shoulder prior to the race, but decided to continue with the run. The team set the seventh-fastest start for all competitors. At the turn called the "Kreisel", Stokes lost control of the bobsleigh and it careened into the wall of the track, and flipped over on top of the four athletes. The four team members climbed out and the bobsleigh was pushed to the end of the track by support staff while the team walked alongside it. The team did not compete in the fourth run of the event, and subsequently were listed as not finishing the event and therefore were placed in the last place overall.

Sled	Athletes	Event	Run 1		Run 2		Run 3		Run 4		Total	
Sled	Athletes	Event	Time	Rank	Time	Rank	Time	Rank	Time	Rank	Time	Rank
JAM	Dudley Stokes, Michael White	Two-man	1:00.20	34	1:00.56	22	1:01.87	31	1:01.23	30	4:03.86	30
JAM	Dudley Stokes, Devon Harris, Michael White, Chris Stokes	Four-man	58.04	24	59.37	25	1:03.19	26	DNF	–	DNF	–

== Legacy ==
The story of the Jamaican bobsleigh team at the 1988 Winter Olympics was turned into the 1993 movie Cool Runnings. However, the film was only loosely based on actual events, with real-life coach Pat Brown later saying that the team had never experienced any of the animosity from the other teams as depicted in the movie.

All of the team members returned for the 1992 Winter Olympics. However, Harris only competed in the two-man event, with his place in the four-man team taken by newcomer Ricky McIntosh. Harris and the Stokes brothers would continue to compete at the Winter Games in the bobsleigh events until the 1998 Winter Olympics in Nagano.
