= Jamaica at the Olympics =

- IOC code: JAM
- NOC: Jamaica Olympic Association
- Website: www.joa.org.jm
- Medals Ranked 38th: Gold 27 Silver 39 Bronze 28 Total 94

Summer appearances
- 1948; 1952; 1956; 1960; 1964; 1968; 1972; 1976; 1980; 1984; 1988; 1992; 1996; 2000; 2004; 2008; 2012; 2016; 2020; 2024; 2028

Winter appearances
- 1988; 1992; 1994; 1998; 2002; 2006; 2010; 2014; 2018; 2022; 2026

Other related appearances
- British West Indies (1960 S)

Jamaica first participated at the Olympic Games in 1948, and has sent athletes to compete in every Summer Olympic Games since then. In 1960, Jamaican athletes competed as part of the West Indies Federation team. Jamaica has also participated in the Winter Olympic Games since 1988, with the Jamaica national bobsleigh team achieving some fame.

Jamaican athletes have won a total of 94 medals, with all but one medal won in athletics, and all but eight of those in the individual and relay sprint events. A July 2024 analysis by The Economist, covering Summer Olympics since 2000, ranked Jamaica first in the world for Olympic medals won relative to GDP.

The National Olympic Committee for Jamaica is the Jamaica Olympic Association, and was founded in 1936.

== Timeline of participation ==
| Olympic Year/s | Teams | | |
|---|---|---|---|
| 1948–1956 | Jamaica | Trinidad and Tobago | |
| 1960 | British West Indies | | |
| 1964 | Jamaica | Trinidad and Tobago | |
| 1968–present | Jamaica | Trinidad and Tobago | Barbados |

== Medal tables ==
=== Medals by Summer Games ===
| Games | Athletes | Gold | Silver | Bronze | Total | Rank |
| (United Kingdom) 1948 London | 13 | 1 | 2 | 0 | 3 | 20 |
| (Finland) 1952 Helsinki | 8 | 2 | 3 | 0 | 5 | 13 |
| (Australia) 1956 Melbourne | 6 | 0 | 0 | 0 | 0 | – |
| (Italy) 1960 Rome | as part of the British West Indies | | | | | |
| (Japan) 1964 Tokyo | 21 | 0 | 0 | 0 | 0 | – |
| 1968 Mexico City | 25 | 0 | 1 | 0 | 1 | 39 |
| (West Germany) 1972 Munich | 33 | 0 | 0 | 1 | 1 | 43 |
| (Canada) 1976 Montreal | 20 | 1 | 1 | 0 | 2 | 21 |
| (Soviet Union) 1980 Moscow | 18 | 0 | 0 | 3 | 3 | 34 |
| (United States) 1984 Los Angeles | 45 | 0 | 1 | 2 | 3 | 28 |
| (South Korea) 1988 Seoul | 35 | 0 | 2 | 0 | 2 | 34 |
| (Spain) 1992 Barcelona | 36 | 0 | 3 | 1 | 4 | 38 |
| (United States) 1996 Atlanta | 46 | 1 | 3 | 2 | 6 | 39 |
| (Australia) 2000 Sydney | 45 | 0 | 6 | 3 | 9 | 54 |
| (Greece) 2004 Athens | 47 | 2 | 1 | 2 | 5 | 35 |
| (China) 2008 Beijing | 50 | 5 | 4 | 2 | 11 | 15 |
| (United Kingdom) 2012 London | 50 | 4 | 5 | 4 | 13 | 18 |
| (Brazil) 2016 Rio de Janeiro | 56 | 6 | 3 | 2 | 11 | 16 |
| (Japan) 2020 Tokyo | 48 | 4 | 1 | 4 | 9 | 21 |
| (France) 2024 Paris | 58 | 1 | 3 | 2 | 6 | 44 |
| (United States) 2028 Los Angeles | future event | | | | | |
| (Australia) 2032 Brisbane | future event | | | | | |
| Total | | 27 | 39 | 28 | 94 | 38 |

=== Medals by Winter Games ===
| Games | Athletes | Gold | Silver | Bronze | Total | Rank |
| (Canada) 1988 Calgary | 4 | 0 | 0 | 0 | 0 | – |
| (France) 1992 Albertville | 5 | 0 | 0 | 0 | 0 | – |
| (Norway) 1994 Lillehammer | 4 | 0 | 0 | 0 | 0 | – |
| (Japan) 1998 Nagano | 6 | 0 | 0 | 0 | 0 | – |
| (United States) 2002 Salt Lake City | 2 | 0 | 0 | 0 | 0 | – |
| (Italy) 2006 Turin | did not participate | | | | | |
| (Canada) 2010 Vancouver | 1 | 0 | 0 | 0 | 0 | – |
| (Russia) 2014 Sochi | 2 | 0 | 0 | 0 | 0 | – |
| (South Korea) 2018 Pyeongchang | 3 | 0 | 0 | 0 | 0 | – |
| (China) 2022 Beijing | 7 | 0 | 0 | 0 | 0 | – |
| (Italy) 2026 Milano Cortina | 6 | 0 | 0 | 0 | 0 | – |
| (France) 2030 French Alps | future event | | | | | |
| (United States) 2034 Utah | future event | | | | | |
| Total | | 0 | 0 | 0 | 0 | – |

=== Medals by summer sport ===
| Sports | Gold | Silver | Bronze | Total | Rank |
|---|---|---|---|---|---|
| Athletics | 27 | 39 | 27 | 93 | 8 |
| Cycling | 0 | 0 | 1 | 1 | 45 |
| Total | 27 | 39 | 28 | 94 | 38 |

== List of medalists ==
| Medal | Name | Games | Sport | Event |
|---|---|---|---|---|
| Gold | Arthur Wint | 1948 London | Athletics | Men's 400 metres |
| Silver | Herb McKenley | 1948 London | Athletics | Men's 400 metres |
| Silver | Arthur Wint | 1948 London | Athletics | Men's 800 metres |
| Gold | George Rhoden | 1952 Helsinki | Athletics | Men's 400 metres |
| Gold | Arthur Wint; Leslie Laing; Herb McKenley; George Rhoden | 1952 Helsinki | Athletics | Men's 4×400 metres relay |
| Silver | Herb McKenley | 1952 Helsinki | Athletics | Men's 100 metres |
| Silver | Herb McKenley | 1952 Helsinki | Athletics | Men's 400 metres |
| Silver | Arthur Wint | 1952 Helsinki | Athletics | Men's 800 metres |
| Silver | Lennox Miller | 1968 Mexico City | Athletics | Men's 100 metres |
| Bronze | Lennox Miller | 1972 Munich | Athletics | Men's 100 metres |
| Gold | Don Quarrie | 1976 Montreal | Athletics | Men's 200 metres |
| Silver | Don Quarrie | 1976 Montreal | Athletics | Men's 100 metres |
| Bronze | Don Quarrie | 1980 Moscow | Athletics | Men's 200 metres |
| Bronze | Merlene Ottey | 1980 Moscow | Athletics | Women's 200 metres |
| Bronze | David Weller | 1980 Moscow | Cycling | Men's 1 km time trial |
| Silver | Albert Lawrence; Greg Meghoo; Don Quarrie; Ray Stewart | 1984 Los Angeles | Athletics | Men's 4×100 metres relay |
| Bronze | Merlene Ottey | 1984 Los Angeles | Athletics | Women's 100 metres |
| Bronze | Merlene Ottey | 1984 Los Angeles | Athletics | Women's 200 metres |
| Silver | Howard Davis; Devon Morris; Winthrop Graham; Bert Cameron | 1988 Seoul | Athletics | Men's 4×400 metres relay |
| Silver | Grace Jackson | 1988 Seoul | Athletics | Women's 200 metres |
| Silver | Winthrop Graham | 1992 Barcelona | Athletics | Men's 400 metres hurdles |
| Silver | Juliet Cuthbert | 1992 Barcelona | Athletics | Women's 100 metres |
| Silver | Juliet Cuthbert | 1992 Barcelona | Athletics | Women's 200 metres |
| Bronze | Merlene Ottey | 1992 Barcelona | Athletics | Women's 200 metres |
| Gold | Deon Hemmings | 1996 Atlanta | Athletics | Women's 400 metres hurdles |
| Silver | James Beckford | 1996 Atlanta | Athletics | Men's long jump |
| Silver | Merlene Ottey | 1996 Atlanta | Athletics | Women's 100 metres |
| Silver | Merlene Ottey | 1996 Atlanta | Athletics | Women's 200 metres |
| Bronze | Greg Haughton; Michael McDonald; Roxbert Martin; Davian Clarke; Dennis Blake; Garth Robinson | 1996 Atlanta | Athletics | Men's 4×400 metres relay |
| Bronze | Michelle Freeman; Juliet Cuthbert; Nikole Mitchell; Merlene Ottey; Gillian Russell; Andria Lloyd | 1996 Atlanta | Athletics | Women's 4×100 metres relay |
| Silver | Michael Blackwood; Greg Haughton; Christopher Williams; Danny McFarlane; Sanjay Ayre; Michael McDonald | 2000 Sydney | Athletics | Men's 4×400 metres relay |
| Silver | Tayna Lawrence | 2000 Sydney | Athletics | Women's 100 metres |
| Silver | Lorraine Graham | 2000 Sydney | Athletics | Women's 400 metres |
| Silver | Deon Hemmings | 2000 Sydney | Athletics | Women's 400 metres hurdles |
| Silver | Merlene Frazer; Tayna Lawrence; Veronica Campbell-Brown; Beverly McDonald; Merlene Ottey | 2000 Sydney | Athletics | Women's 4×100 metres relay |
| Silver | Sandie Richards; Catherine Scott; Deon Hemmings; Lorraine Graham; Charmaine Howell; Michelle Burgher | 2000 Sydney | Athletics | Women's 4×400 metres relay |
| Bronze | Greg Haughton | 2000 Sydney | Athletics | Men's 400 metres |
| Bronze | Merlene Ottey | 2000 Sydney | Athletics | Women's 100 metres |
| Bronze | Beverly McDonald | 2000 Sydney | Athletics | Women's 200 metres |
| Gold | Veronica Campbell-Brown | 2004 Athens | Athletics | Women's 200 metres |
| Gold | Tayna Lawrence; Sherone Simpson; Aleen Bailey; Veronica Campbell-Brown; Beverly McDonald | 2004 Athens | Athletics | Women's 4×100 metres relay |
| Silver | Danny McFarlane | 2004 Athens | Athletics | Men's 400 metres hurdles |
| Bronze | Veronica Campbell-Brown | 2004 Athens | Athletics | Women's 100 metres |
| Bronze | Ronetta Smith; Novlene Williams; Nadia Davy; Sandie Richards; Michelle Burgher | 2004 Athens | Athletics | Women's 4×400 metres relay |
| Gold | Usain Bolt | 2008 Beijing | Athletics | Men's 100 metres |
| Gold | Usain Bolt | 2008 Beijing | Athletics | Men's 200 metres |
| Gold | Shelly-Ann Fraser | 2008 Beijing | Athletics | Women's 100 metres |
| Gold | Veronica Campbell-Brown | 2008 Beijing | Athletics | Women's 200 metres |
| Gold | Melaine Walker | 2008 Beijing | Athletics | Women's 400 metres hurdles |
| Silver | Sherone Simpson | 2008 Beijing | Athletics | Women's 100 metres |
| Silver | Kerron Stewart | 2008 Beijing | Athletics | Women's 100 metres |
| Silver | Shericka Williams | 2008 Beijing | Athletics | Women's 400 metres |
| Silver | Shericka Williams; Shereefa Lloyd; Rosemarie Whyte; Novlene Williams; Bobby-Gaye Wilkins | 2008 Beijing | Athletics | Women's 4×400 metres relay |
| Bronze | Kerron Stewart | 2008 Beijing | Athletics | Women's 200 metres |
| Bronze | Chelsea Hammond | 2008 Beijing | Athletics | Women's long jump |
| Gold | Usain Bolt | 2012 London | Athletics | Men's 100 metres |
| Gold | Usain Bolt | 2012 London | Athletics | Men's 200 metres |
| Gold | Shelly-Ann Fraser | 2012 London | Athletics | Women's 100 metres |
| Gold | Kemar Bailey-Cole; Yohan Blake; Usain Bolt; Nesta Carter; Michael Frater | 2012 London | Athletics | Men's 4 × 100 m relay |
| Silver | Yohan Blake | 2012 London | Athletics | Men's 100 metres |
| Silver | Yohan Blake | 2012 London | Athletics | Men's 200 metres |
| Silver | Shelly-Ann Fraser-Pryce | 2012 London | Athletics | Women's 200 metres |
| Silver | Veronica Campbell-Brown; Shelly-Ann Fraser-Pryce; Sherone Simpson; Kerron Stewart | 2012 London | Athletics | Women's 4×100 metres relay |
| Silver | Christine Day; Shereefa Lloyd; Rosemarie Whyte; Shericka Williams; Novlene Williams-Mills | 2012 London | Athletics | Women's 4×400 metres relay |
| Bronze | Warren Weir | 2012 London | Athletics | Men's 200 metres |
| Bronze | Hansle Parchment | 2012 London | Athletics | Men's 110 metres hurdles |
| Bronze | Veronica Campbell-Brown | 2012 London | Athletics | Women's 100 metres |
| Bronze | Kaliese Spencer | 2012 London | Athletics | Women's 400 metres hurdles |
| Gold | Usain Bolt | 2016 Rio de Janeiro | Athletics | Men's 100 metres |
| Gold | Usain Bolt | 2016 Rio de Janeiro | Athletics | Men's 200 metres |
| Gold | Elaine Thompson | 2016 Rio de Janeiro | Athletics | Women's 100 metres |
| Gold | Elaine Thompson | 2016 Rio de Janeiro | Athletics | Women's 200 metres |
| Gold | Omar McLeod | 2016 Rio de Janeiro | Athletics | Men's 110 metres hurdles |
| Gold | Asafa Powell; Yohan Blake; Nickel Ashmeade; Usain Bolt; Kemar Bailey-Cole; Jevaughn Minzie | 2016 Rio de Janeiro | Athletics | Men's 4 × 100 m relay |
| Silver | Christania Williams; Elaine Thompson; Veronica Campbell-Brown; Shelly-Ann Fraser-Pryce; Simone Facey*; Shashalee Forbes* | 2016 Rio de Janeiro | Athletics | Women's 4 × 100 m relay |
| Silver | Stephenie Ann McPherson; Anneisha McLaughlin-Whilby; Shericka Jackson; Novlene Williams-Mills; Christine Day*; Chrisann Gordon* | 2016 Rio de Janeiro | Athletics | Women's 4 × 400 m relay |
| Silver | Nathon Allen; Fitzroy Dunkley; Javon Francis; Peter Matthews; Rusheen McDonald* | 2016 Rio de Janeiro | Athletics | Men's 4 × 400 m relay |
| Bronze | Shelly-Ann Fraser-Pryce | 2016 Rio de Janeiro | Athletics | Women's 100 metres |
| Bronze | Shericka Jackson | 2016 Rio de Janeiro | Athletics | Women's 400 metres |
| Gold | Elaine Thompson Herah | 2020 Tokyo | Athletics | Women's 100 metres |
| Gold | Elaine Thompson Herah | 2020 Tokyo | Athletics | Women's 200 metres |
| Gold | Hansle Parchment | 2020 Tokyo | Athletics | Men's 110 metres hurdles |
| Gold | Remona Burchell; Shelly-Ann Fraser-Pryce; Shericka Jackson; Natasha Morrison; Elaine Thompson-Herah; Briana Williams | 2020 Tokyo | Athletics | Women's 4 × 100 metres relay |
| Silver | Shelly-Ann Fraser-Pryce | 2020 Tokyo | Athletics | Women's 100 metres |
| Bronze | Shericka Jackson | 2020 Tokyo | Athletics | Women's 100 metres |
| Bronze | Megan Tapper | 2020 Tokyo | Athletics | Women's 100 metres hurdles |
| Bronze | Ronald Levy | 2020 Tokyo | Athletics | Men's 110 metres hurdles |
| Bronze | Junelle Bromfield; Shericka Jackson; Roneisha McGregor; Janieve Russell; Stacey-Ann Williams | 2020 Tokyo | Athletics | Women's 4 × 400 metres relay |
| Gold | Rojé Stona | 2024 Paris | Athletics | Men's discus throw |
| Silver | Shanieka Ricketts | 2024 Paris | Athletics | Women's triple jump |
| Silver | Kishane Thompson | 2024 Paris | Athletics | Men's 100 m |
| Silver | Wayne Pinnock | 2024 Paris | Athletics | Men's long jump |
| Bronze | Rajindra Campbell | 2024 Paris | Athletics | Men's shot put |
| Bronze | Rasheed Broadbell | 2024 Paris | Athletics | Men's 110 m hurdles |

== See also ==
- List of flag bearers for Jamaica at the Olympics
- Tropical nations at the Winter Olympics
- British West Indies at the Olympics former
