= Jamaica at the 2010 Winter Olympics =

- IOC code: JAM
- NOC: Jamaica Olympic Association
- Website: www.joa.org.jm

in Vancouver
- Competitors: 1 in 1 sport
- Flag bearer: Errol Kerr
- Medals: Gold 0 Silver 0 Bronze 0 Total 0

Winter Olympics appearances (overview)
- 1988; 1992; 1994; 1998; 2002; 2006; 2010; 2014; 2018; 2022; 2026

Jamaica competed at the 2010 Winter Olympics in Vancouver, Canada, from 12 to 28 February 2010. It was the country's sixth appearance at the Winter Olympics, since its debut at the 1988 Winter Olympics in Calgary, and marked Jamaica's return to the Winter Olympics after an eight-year absence, having not sent a team to the 2006 Winter Olympics in Turin. The Jamaican delegation consisted of one male athlete competing in one sport. It did not win any medals at the Games.

== Background ==
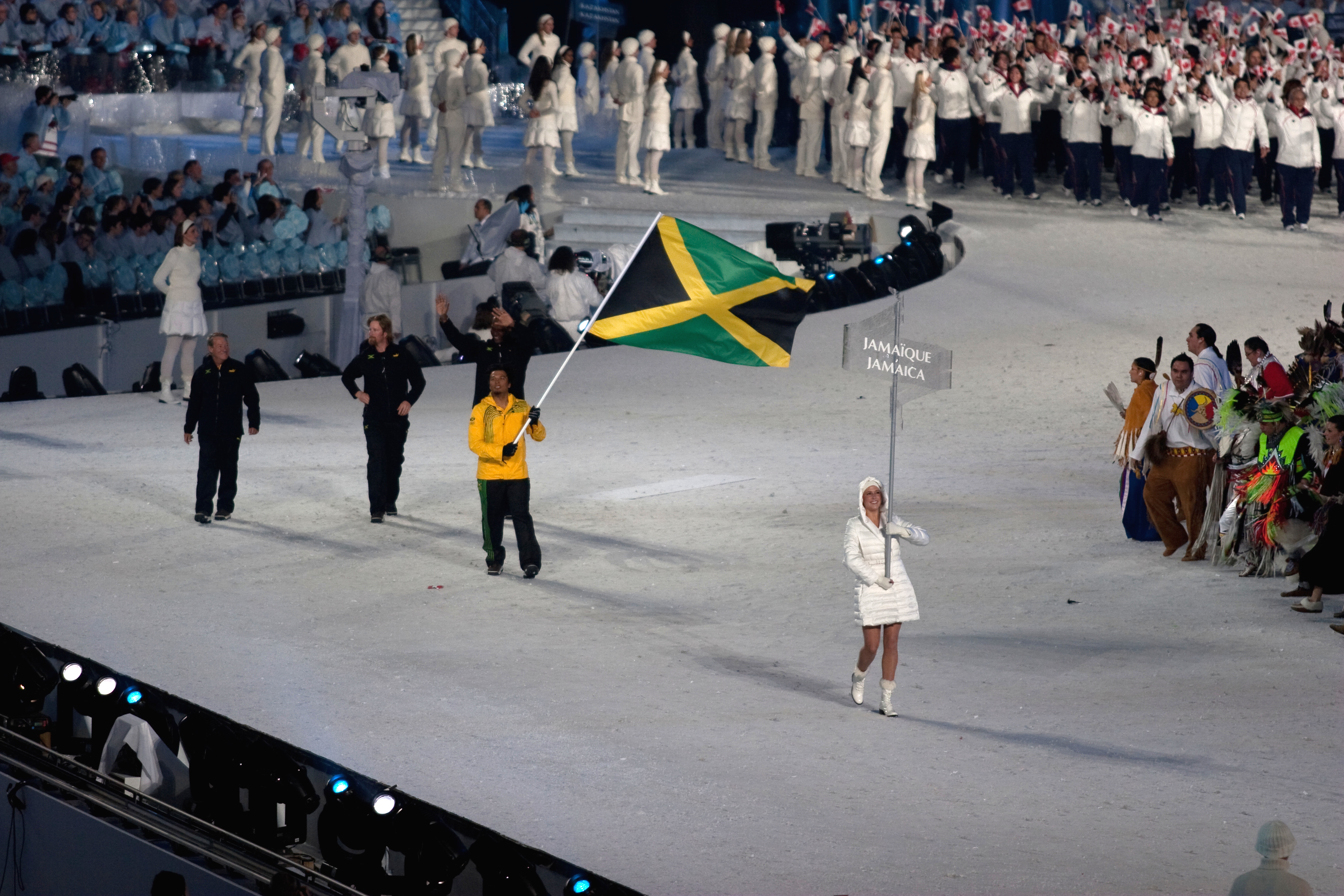
Errol Kerr during the opening ceremony

The Jamaica Olympic Association was recognized by the International Olympic Committee (IOC) in 1936. Jamaica first participate in the 1948 Summer Olympics held in London, and has since participated in every Summer Olympics. Jamaica made its first Winter Olympics appearance at the 1988 Winter Olympics in Calgary, and the 2010 Winter Olympics was the country's sixth appearance at the Winter Olympics.

The 2010 Winter Olympics was held in Vancouver, Canada, between 12 and 28 February 2010. Freestyle skier Errol Kerr, the sole Jamaican athlete at the Games, served as the country's flagbearer during the opening ceremony at BC Place stadium in Vancouver on 12 February 2010. Jamaica did not win a medal at the Games.

== Competitors ==
The Jamaican team consisted of one male athlete competing in one sport.

Sport	Men	Women	Total
Freestyle skiing	1	0	1
Total	1	0	1

== Freestyle skiing ==
The men's ski cross was introduced for the first time at the 2010 Winter Olympics. As per the International Ski Federation (FIS), a maximum of 35 male athletes were allowed to compete in the men's ski cross event with a maximum of four per nation. The quotas were allocated based on the FIS World Ranking for the twelve-month period covering the 2008–09 and 2009–10 Freestyle World Cup and the FIS Freestyle World Ski Championships. Errol Kerr qualified by virtue of being ranked in the top 35 in the FIS rankings.

Kerr was born in Brooklyn, New York, to a Jamaican father and an American mother, and grew up in Truckee, California and Westmoreland Parish, Jamaica. He had previously competed with the United States Ski Team before choosing to represent his father's country. His participation marked Jamaica's debut in freestyle skiing at the Winter Olympics and the first time a Jamaican athlete had qualified for the Winter Olympics in an individual sport.

The men's ski cross event was held on 21 February 2010 at the Cypress Mountain ski area in West Vancouver. Kerr finished ninth in the qualification round, and advanced to the 1/8 Final, where he finished first in his heat. He then advanced to the quarterfinals where he finished third in his heat and did not progress further. He was classified ninth out of the 45 competitors in the overall classification.

Athlete	Event	Qualifying		1/8 Final	Quarterfinal	Semifinal	Final
Athlete	Event	Time	Rank	Rank	Rank	Rank	Rank
Errol Kerr	Men's ski cross	1:13.71	9 Q	1 Q	3	Did not advance	9

== Bobsleigh ==
The two-man bobsleigh team of Hanukkah Wallace and Joel Alexander was on line to qualify for the two-man team event at the Olympics after finishing 11th place in the 2009 America's Cup, however did not make the final qualification.
