= Anthony Watson (skeleton racer) =

American-born Olympic athlete (born 1989)

Personal information
- Nationality: Jamaican, American
- Born: 5 November 1989 (age 36)
- Height: 1.80 m (5 ft 11 in)

Sport
- Sport: Skeleton

Anthony Watson (born 5 November 1989) is an American-born skeleton racer who competed on behalf of Jamaica in the 2018 Winter Olympics, becoming the first athlete to represent the Caribbean nation in the winter sport.

== Biography ==
Born and raised in Vineland, New Jersey, he is the son of Basil and Gloria Watson. Watson attended Cumberland Christian School, from which he graduated in 2008. He attended Roberts Wesleyan College before transferring to the University of the Arts in Philadelphia and had competed in track in the 100m, 200m and the 4x100m relay at the junior level until an injury prevented him from advancing to the top levels of competition in track and field.

Watson found the United States Bobsled and Skeleton Federation after checking out the tryout pages for every sport in which the United States was represented in international competition and chose skeleton after seeing a series of videos. An aspiring Olympian from the time he was a child, Watson participated for three years in the American training program for bobsled and skeleton, but "left on peaceful terms". Given that his father had been born in Jamaica, Watson was eligible to compete on behalf of his father's native country. Ranked 79th in the world based on his competition results, his qualification standards with the International Bobsleigh and Skeleton Federation were not sufficient for him to be eligible to receive one of the 30 guaranteed berths granted for male competitors to the 2018 Winter Olympics in South Korea, but Watson was given the final slot to represent Jamaica after nations with individuals who had better times turned down spots, making him the first athlete from Jamaica to compete in skeleton.

With finishing times of 53.13, 54.04 and 53.35 seconds in the Olympic skeleton competition, Watson finished in 29th place in each of the three first heats. His top speed was 75.4 miles per hour (121.3 km/h), reached during the first heat. His total time in the three heats of 2:40.52 meant that he did not qualify for the final race; he placed him almost 10 seconds behind Yun Sung-bin of South Korea, who went on to win the gold medal.
