= Jamaica at the 1992 Summer Olympics =

- IOC code: JAM
- NOC: Jamaica Olympic Association

in Barcelona
- Competitors: 36 (22 men and 14 women) in 5 sports
- Flag bearer: Merlene Ottey
- Medals Ranked 38th: Gold 0 Silver 3 Bronze 1 Total 4

Summer Olympics appearances (overview)
- 1948; 1952; 1956; 1960; 1964; 1968; 1972; 1976; 1980; 1984; 1988; 1992; 1996; 2000; 2004; 2008; 2012; 2016; 2020; 2024

Other related appearances
- British West Indies (1960 S)

Jamaica competed at the 1992 Summer Olympics in Barcelona, Spain. 36 competitors, 22 men and 14 women, took part in 23 events in 5 sports.

== Medalists ==
Medal	Name	Sport	Event	Date
Silver	Juliet Cuthbert	Athletics	Women's 100 metres	1 August
Silver	Juliet Cuthbert	Athletics	Women's 200 metres	6 August
Silver	Winthrop Graham	Athletics	Men's 400 metres hurdles	6 August
Bronze	Merlene Ottey	Athletics	Women's 200 metres	6 August

== Competitors ==
The following is the list of number of competitors in the Games.

Sport	Men	Women	Total
Athletics	14	14	28
Boxing	2	–	2
Cycling	3	0	3
Sailing	2	0	2
Table tennis	1	0	1
Total	22	14	36

== Athletics ==
Men's 100 metres

- Ray Stewart

- Heat – 10.61
- Quarterfinals – 10.36
- Semifinals – 10.33
- Final – 10.22 (→ 7th place)

Men's 200 metres

- Clive Wright

- Heat – 20.98
- Quarterfinals – 20.70
- Semifinals – 20.82 (→ did not advance)

Men's 400 metres

- Devon Morris

- Heat – 46.45
- Quarterfinals – 45.67 (→ did not advance)

- Dennis Blake

- Heat – 45.92
- Quarterfinals – 46.49 (→ did not advance)

- Anthony Wallace

- Heat – 46.88 (→ did not advance)

Men's 800 metres

- Clive Terrelonge

- Heat – 1:46.64
- Semifinals – 1:51.03 (→ did not advance)

Men's 4 × 100 m Relay

- Michael Green, Rudolph Mighty, Anthony Wallace, and Ray Stewart

- Heat – DNF (→ did not advance)

Men's 4 × 400 m Relay

- Dennis Blake, Devon Morris, Howard Davis, and Patrick O'Connor

- Heat – DSQ (→ did not advance)

Men's 110m Hurdles

- Richard Bucknor

- Heats – 13.91
- Quarterfinals – 14.22 (→ did not advance)

- Anthony Knight

- Heats – 14.12 (→ did not advance)

Men's 400m Hurdles

- Winthrop Graham

- Heat – 48.51
- Semifinal – 47.62
- Final – 47.66 (→ Silver Medal)

- Mark Thompson

- Heat – DSQ (→ did not advance)

Women's 100 metres

- Juliet Cuthbert
- Merlene Ottey
- Dahlia Duhaney

Women's 200 metres

- Juliet Cuthbert
- Merlene Ottey
- Grace Jackson

Women's 400 metres

- Sandie Richards
- Juliet Campbell
- Claudine Williams

Women's 100m Hurdles

- Gillian Russell
- Dionne Rose
- Michelle Freeman

Women's 400m Hurdles

- Deon Hemmings

- Heat – 55.48
- Semifinal – 54.70
- Final – 55.58 (→ 7th place)

Women's 4 × 100 m Relay

- Michelle Freeman, Juliet Cuthbert, Dahlia Duhaney, and Merlene Ottey

Women's 4 × 400 m Relay

- Catherine Pomales-Scott, Cathy Rattray-Williams, Juliet Campbell, Sandie Richards, and Claudine Williams

Women's Long Jump

- Dionne Rose

- Heat – 6.22 m (→ did not advance)

- Diane Guthrie-Gresham

- Heat – NM (→ did not advance)

== Boxing ==
Men's Light Flyweight (– 48 kg)

- St. Aubyn Hines

- First Round – Lost to Pramuansak Phosuwan (THA), RSC-2

Men's Lightweight (– 60 kg)

- Delroy Leslie

- First Round – Lost to Shigeyuki Dobashi (JPN), 5:11

== Cycling ==
Three male cyclists represented Jamaica in 1992.

Men's road race

- Michael McKay
- Arthur Tenn

Men's sprint

- Andrew Myers

Men's 1 km time trial

- Andrew Myers

== Sailing ==
Men's Two Person Dinghy

- Andrew Gooding and Robert Quinton

== Table tennis ==
Men's singles

- Michael Hyatt

== See also ==
- Jamaica at the 1990 Commonwealth Games
- Jamaica at the 1991 Pan American Games
- Jamaica at the 1994 Commonwealth Games
