= Jamaica at the 1988 Summer Olympics =

- IOC code: JAM
- NOC: Jamaica Olympic Association

in Seoul
- Competitors: 35 (24 men and 11 women) in 5 sports
- Flag bearer: Merlene Ottey
- Medals Ranked 34th: Gold 0 Silver 2 Bronze 0 Total 2

Summer Olympics appearances (overview)
- 1948; 1952; 1956; 1960; 1964; 1968; 1972; 1976; 1980; 1984; 1988; 1992; 1996; 2000; 2004; 2008; 2012; 2016; 2020; 2024

Other related appearances
- British West Indies (1960 S)

Jamaica competed at the 1988 Summer Olympics in Seoul, South Korea. 35 competitors, 24 men and 11 women, took part in 22 events in 5 sports.

== Competitors ==
The following is the list of number of competitors in the Games.

Sport	Men	Women	Total
Athletics	15	11	26
Boxing	4	–	4
Cycling	3	0	3
Table tennis	1	0	1
Weightlifting	1	–	1
Total	24	11	35

== Medalists ==
Medal	Name	Sport	Event	Date
Silver	Grace Jackson	Athletics	Women's 200 metres	29 September
Silver	Howard Burnett; Bert Cameron; Howard Davis; Trevor Graham; Winthrop Graham; Devon Morris	Athletics	Men's 4 × 400 metres relay	1 October

== Athletics ==
Men
Track and road events

Athlete	Event	Heat Round 1		Heat Round 2		Semifinal		Final	
Athlete	Event	Time	Rank	Time	Rank	Time	Rank	Time	Rank
John Mair	100 metres	10.44	22 q	10.41	21	Did not advance			
Andrew Smith	100 metres	10.49	30 Q	10.63	44	Did not advance			
Ray Stewart	100 metres	10.22	3 Q	10.25	9 Q	10.18	4 Q	12.26	7
Clive Wright	200 metres	20.94	15 Q	20.87	20	Did not advance			
Bert Cameron	400 metres	46.24	17 Q	45.16	11 Q	44.50	5 Q	44.94	6
Howard Davis	400 metres	45.97	10 Q	45.40	16 Q	45.48	13	Did not advance	
Devon Morris	400 metres	45.95	9 Q	45.30	14 Q	45.68	14	Did not advance	
Derick Adamson	Marathon	—N/a						2:47:57	84
Richard Bucknor	110 metres hurdles	13.89	12 Q	13.91	14 Q	13.98	15	Did not advance	
Andrew Parker	110 metres hurdles	14.00	18 Q	14.05	21	Did not advance			
Winthrop Graham	400 metres hurdles	49.40	4 Q	—N/a		48.37	3 Q	48.04	5
Chris Faulknor; Greg Meghoo; Clive Wright; John Mair	4 × 100 metres relay	39.53	10 Q	—N/a		38.75	5 Q	38.47	4
Howard Davis; Devon Morris; Winthrop Graham; Bert Cameron; Howard Burnett (*); Trevor Graham (*)	4 × 400 metres relay	3:04.00	3 Q	—N/a		3:00.94	3 Q	3:00.30	2nd place, silver medalist(s)

Women
Track and road events

Athlete	Event	Heat Round 1		Heat Round 2		Semifinal		Final	
Athlete	Event	Time	Rank	Time	Rank	Time	Rank	Time	Rank
Juliet Cuthbert	100 metres	11.14	7 Q	11.03	8 Q	11.10	8 Q	11.26	7
Grace Jackson	100 metres	11.18	9 Q	11.13	13 Q	11.06	7 Q	10.97	4
Merlene Ottey	100 metres	11.03	2 Q	11.03	8 Q	DNS		Did not advance	
Grace Jackson	200 metres	22.66	2 Q	22.24	2 Q	22.13	3 Q	21.72	2nd place, silver medalist(s)
Merlene Ottey	200 metres	23.06	10 Q	22.30	4 Q	22.07	2 Q	21.99	4
Cathy Rattray-Williams	400 metres	52.39	10 Q	51.81	12 Q	50.82	13	Did not advance	
Sandie Richards	400 metres	52.19	6 Q	52.90	22	Did not advance			
Sharon Powell	800 metres	2:03.49	20	—N/a		Did not advance			
Juliet Cuthbert; Grace Jackson; Merlene Ottey; Ethlyn Tate; Vivienne Spence (*); Laurel Johnson (*)	4 × 100 metres relay	43.50	6 Q	—N/a		43.30	6 Q	DNS	
Sandie Richards; Andrea Thomas; Cathy Rattray-Williams; Sharon Powell; Marcia Tate (*)	4 × 400 metres relay	3:26.83	2 Q	—N/a				3:23.13	5

== Boxing ==
Athlete	Event	Round of 64	Round of 32	Round of 16	Quarterfinals	Semifinals	Final	
Athlete	Event	Opposition Result	Opposition Result	Opposition Result	Opposition Result	Opposition Result	Opposition Result	Rank
Mark Kennedy	Lightweight	Bye	Maea (COK); W RSC R1	Chuprenski (BUL); L 0–5	Did not advance			
Richard Hamilton	Welterweight	Bye	Gantulga (MGL); L RSC R2	Did not advance				
Gary Smikle	Light middleweight	Bye	Zaytsev (URS); L 0–5	Did not advance				
Terry Dixon	Light heavyweight	—N/a	Madsen (DEN); L RSC R2	Did not advance				

== Cycling ==
Three male cyclists represented Jamaica in 1988.

=== Road ===
Men

Athlete	Event	Time	Rank
Arthur Tenn	Road race	4:48:06	107
Raymond Thomas	Road race	4:43:15	97

=== Track ===
Points race

Athlete	Event	Qualification			Final		
Athlete	Event	Laps	Points	Rank	Laps	Points	Rank
Peter Aldridge	Points race	–1 lap	15	9 Q	–3 laps	4	22

== Table tennis ==
Men

Athlete	Event	Group Stage								Round of 16	Quarterfinal	Semifinal	Final	
Athlete	Event	Opposition Result	Opposition Result	Opposition Result	Opposition Result	Opposition Result	Opposition Result	Opposition Result	Rank	Opposition Result	Opposition Result	Opposition Result	Opposition Result	Rank
Garfield Jones	Singles	Lupulesku (YUG); L 0–3	Mazunov (URS); L 0–3	Ono (JPN); L 0–3	Costantini (ITA); L 2–3	Liu (HKG); L w/o	Núñez (CHI); L 1–3	Kim (KOR); L 0–3	7	Did not advance				

== Weightlifting ==
Athlete	Event	Snatch		Clean & jerk		Total	Rank
Athlete	Event	Result	Rank	Result	Rank	Total	Rank
Calvin Stamp	Men's +110 kg	150.0	12	195.0	9	345.0	11
