= Jamaica at the 2014 Winter Olympics =

- IOC code: JAM
- NOC: Jamaica Olympic Association
- Website: www.joa.org.jm

in Sochi
- Competitors: 2 in 1 sport
- Flag bearers: Marvin Dixon (opening); Volunteer (closing)
- Medals: Gold 0 Silver 0 Bronze 0 Total 0

Winter Olympics appearances (overview)
- 1988; 1992; 1994; 1998; 2002; 2006; 2010; 2014; 2018; 2022; 2026

Jamaica competed at the 2014 Winter Olympics in Sochi, Russia, from 7 to 23 February 2014. It was the country's seventh appearance at the Winter Olympics, since its debut at the 1988 Winter Olympics in Calgary. The Jamaican delegation consisted of two athletes competing in one sport. It did not win any medals at the Games. The Jamaican Bobsled Team returned to the Olympics after last competing in the 2002 Winter Olympics.

== Background ==
The Jamaica Olympic Association was recognized by the International Olympic Committee (IOC) in 1936. Jamaica sent 14 athletes to the 1948 Summer Olympics held in London, and has since participated in every Summer Olympics. The nation made its first Winter Olympics appearance at the 1988 Winter Olympics in Calgary, and the 2014 Winter Olympics was the nation's seventh appearance at the Winter Olympics.

The 2022 Winter Olympics was held in Sochi, Russia, between 7 and 23 February 2014. Bobsled athlete Marvin Dixon was Jamaica's flagbearer during the opening ceremony. A volunteer carried the flag during the closing ceremony. Jamaica did not win a medal at the Games.

== Competitors ==
The Jamaican team consists of a two athletes, competing in a single sport.

Sport	Men	Women	Total
Bobsleigh	2	0	2
Total	2	0	2

== Bobsleigh ==
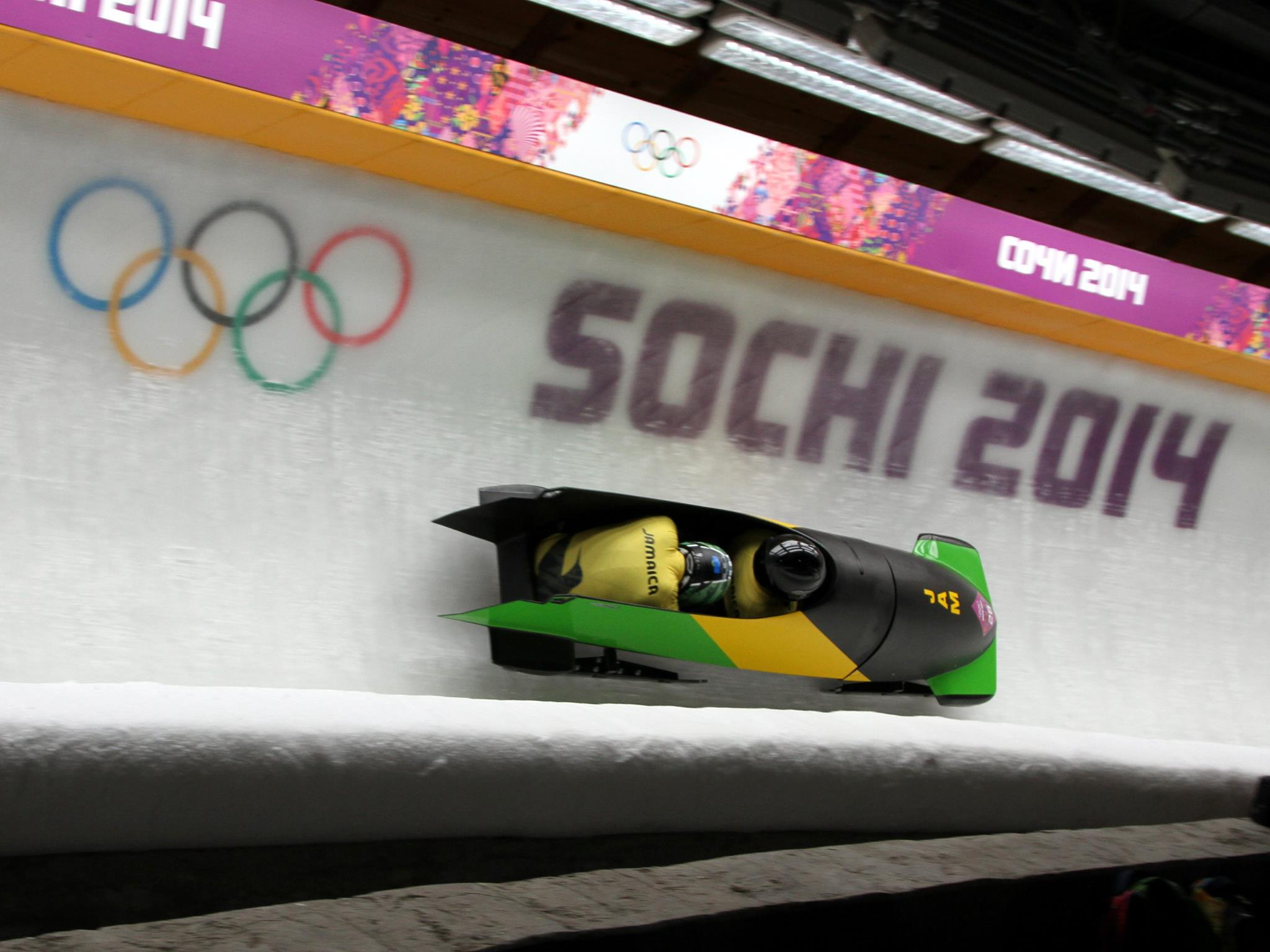
The Jamaican two-man bobsleigh at the 2014 Winter Olympics

As per the International Bobsleigh & Skeleton Federation, a maximum of 170 quota spots were available to athletes to compete at the games including 130 for men and 40 for women. The qualification was based on the world rankings as on 20 January 2014. Bobsled pilots in five different races on three different tracks during the 2012/13 season or 2013/14 season. Additionally, the pilot must been ranked among the top 50 for the men's events. Jamaica qualified one sled for the two-man event.

The Jamaican Bobsled Team returned to the Olympics after last competing in the 2002 Winter Olympics. However, the team lacked funding to compete in the Games. About $30,000 was raised in Dogecoin on the team's behalf. An additional $121,160 was raised in online donations through Crowdtilt in January 2014. The team consisted of Marvin Dixon and Winston Watts. While Dixon made his Olympic debut, it was Watts' fourth participation in the Winter Olympics having represented Jamaica three times in consecutive Olympics from 1996 to 2002.

The bobsleigh events were held at the Tsentr Sannogo Sporta Sanki, Rzhanaya Polyana between 16 and 23 February 2022. The Jamaican team finished the first two runs in 30th and last position. In the third run, the team finished in 29th place after the Serbian team did not compete. This meant they failed to advance to the final run and finished in 29th overall.

Athlete	Event	Run 1		Run 2		Run 3		Run 4		Total	
Athlete	Event	Time	Rank	Time	Rank	Time	Rank	Time	Rank	Time	Rank
Marvin Dixon*; Winston Watts	Two-man	58.42	30	58.81	30	58.17	29	did not advance		2:55.40	29

* – Denotes the driver of each sled
