= Jamaica at the 2018 Winter Olympics =

- Flag of Jamaica
- IOC code: JAM
- NOC: Jamaica Olympic Association
- Website: www.joa.org.jm

in Pyeongchang County, South Korea 9–25 February 2018
- Competitors: 3 (1 man and 2 women) in 2 sports
- Flag bearer: Audra Segree
- Medals: Gold 0 Silver 0 Bronze 0 Total 0

Winter Olympics appearances (overview)
- 1988; 1992; 1994; 1998; 2002; 2006; 2010; 2014; 2018; 2022; 2026

Jamaica competed at the 2018 Winter Olympics in Pyeongchang County, South Korea, from 9 to 25 February 2018. It was the country's eighth appearance at the Winter Olympics, since its debut at the 1988 Winter Olympics in Calgary. The Jamaican delegation consisted of three athletes competing in two sports. It did not win any medals at the Games.

== Background ==
The Jamaica Olympic Association was recognized by the International Olympic Committee (IOC) in 1936. Jamaica sent 14 athletes to the 1948 Summer Olympics held in London, and has since participated in every Summer Olympics. The nation made its first Winter Olympics appearance at the 1988 Winter Olympics in Calgary, and the 2022 Winter Olympics was the nation's eighth appearance at the Winter Olympics.

The 2018 Winter Olympics was held in Pyeongchang County, South Korea, between 9 and 25 February 2018. Leo Campbell was the chef de mission for the Jamaican delegation, and the delegation was accompanied by Chris Stokes, president of the Jamaica Bobsleigh and Skeleton Federation and bobsleigh coach Dudley Stokes, team captain. Bobsleigh athlete Audra Segree was Jamaica's flagbearer during the opening ceremony. Jamaica did not win a medal at the Games.

== Competitors ==
The Jamaican team consisted of three athletes (one male and two female) competing in two sports.

Sport	Men	Women	Total
Bobsleigh	0	2	2
Skeleton	1	0	1
Total	1	2	3

== Bobsleigh ==
As per the International Bobsleigh & Skeleton Federation (IBSF), the qualification for the two-woman event was based on the combined IBSF world rankings for the 2017/2018 season as on 14 January 2018, covering the World Cup, Europe Cup and North American Cup. The top two countries were awarded three sleds each; the next four countries received two sleds each. The bobsled pilots were required to have competed in three difference races in the time period and be ranked in the top 40 in the rankings. Jamaica qualified one sled for the two-woman event, marking the country's first ever appearance in the women's bobsleigh events at the Olympics.

Jazmine Fenlator-Victorian, the bobsled pilot, had previously represented the United States in the two-woman event at the 2014 Winter Olympics in Sochi, where she and Lolo Jones finished 11th. She switched to compete for Jamaica in 2015 as her father was Jamaican. Brakewoman Carrie Russell was a former sprinter who had won gold in the 4×100 metres relay event at the 2013 World Athletics Championships in Moscow. Audra Segree was also named in the team but did not race in the event, with Russell competing alongside Fenlator-Victorian in all four runs.

The women's two-woman event was held at the Alpensia Sliding Centre on 20 and 21 February 2018. Fenlator-Victorian and Russell finished 19th out of 20 sleds with a combined time of 3:25.94 across their four runs.

Athletes	Event	Run 1		Run 2		Run 3		Run 4		Total	
Athletes	Event	Time	Rank	Time	Rank	Time	Rank	Time	Rank	Time	Rank
Jazmine Fenlator-Victorian*; Carrie Russell	Two-woman	0:51.29	17	0:51.50	19	0:51.83	19	0:51.32	13	3:25.94	19

* – Denotes the driver of each sled

== Skeleton ==
As per the International Bobsleigh & Skeleton Federation, a total of 30 quota spots were available for male competitors in the skeleton event. The qualification was based on the combined IBSF rankings of 14 January 2018. Competitors were required to have participated in at least five IBSF races on three tracks during the 2016/17 or 2017/18 season, and to be ranked in the top 60 for men. Anthony Watson was born in Vineland, New Jersey to a Jamaican father. He was ranked 43rd in the world and did not directly earn a berth. However, he was allocated a quota spot after several withdrawals. His selection marked Jamaica's debut at the skeleton event at the Winter Olympics. Watson was a former sprinter and track and field athlete, had attended trials for the United States bobsleigh team before switching to skeleton in 2016.

The men's skeleton event was held at the Alpensia Sliding Centre on 15 and 16 February 2018. Watson posted times of 53.13, 54.04 and 53.35 seconds across his three heats respectively, finishing 29th in each heat and finished 29th out of the 30 competitors in the overall rankings. He did not advance to the fourth and final run, which was contested only by the top 20 competitors.

Athlete	Event	Run 1		Run 2		Run 3		Run 4		Total	
Athlete	Event	Time	Rank	Time	Rank	Time	Rank	Time	Rank	Time	Rank
Anthony Watson	Men's	0:53.13	29	0:54.04	29	0:53.35	29	Did not advance		2:40.52	29

== See also ==
- Tropical nations at the Winter Olympics
