= Jamaica at the 2002 Winter Olympics =

- IOC code: JAM
- NOC: Jamaica Olympic Association
- Website: www.joa.org.jm

in Salt Lake City, Utah
- Competitors: 2 men in 1 sport
- Flag bearer: Winston Watts
- Medals: Gold 0 Silver 0 Bronze 0 Total 0

Winter Olympics appearances (overview)
- 1988; 1992; 1994; 1998; 2002; 2006; 2010; 2014; 2018; 2022; 2026

Jamaica competed at the 2002 Winter Olympics in Salt Lake City, United States, from 8 to 24 February 2002. It was the country's fifth appearance at the Winter Olympics, since its debut at the 1988 Winter Olympics in Calgary. The Jamaican delegation consisted of two male athletes competing in one sport. It did not win any medals at the Games.

== Background ==
The Jamaica Olympic Association was recognized by the International Olympic Committee (IOC) in 1936. Jamaica first participated in the 1948 Summer Olympics held in London, and has since participated in every Summer Olympics. The nation made its first Winter Olympics appearance at the 1988 Winter Olympics in Calgary, and the 2002 Winter Olympics was the country's fifth appearance at the Winter Olympics.

The 2002 Winter Olympics was held in Salt Lake City, United States, between 8 and 24 February 2002. Bobsleigh athlete Winston Watts served as Jamaica's flagbearer during the opening ceremony at Rice-Eccles Stadium on 8 February 2002. Jamaica did not win a medal at the Games.

== Competitors ==
The Jamaican team consisted of two male athletes competing in one sport.

Sport	Men	Women	Total
Bobsleigh	2	0	2
Total	2	0	2

== Bobsleigh ==
Jamaica qualified one sled for the men's two-man event, which consisted of Winston Watts and Lascelles Brown. This was the third consecutive Olympic appearance for Watts, who made his Olympic debut at the 1994 Winter Olympics. Lascelles Brown was the breakman of the sled. He was born in May Pen, Jamaica, and had been part of the Jamaica national bobsled team since 1999. The team also consisted of reserve Clive McDonald, who did not compete.

The bobsleigh events were held between 16 and 23 February 2002 at the Utah Olympic Park track in Park City. The two-man bobsleigh took place on 16 and 17 February 2002. Watts and Brown set the fastest push-start times of the entire field, recording an Olympic push-start record of 4.78 seconds. In their first run, Brown and Watts completed the course in 48.59 seconds and was classified 27th amongst the 38 sleds. They improved on their second run and recorded their fastest time of the competition at 48.59 seconds. Their third run was their slowest of the four at 49.01 seconds and they completed the final run in 48.76 seconds. Despite their push-start advantage, Watts and Brown finished 28th out of 37 competing teams with a combined time of 3:14.94 across their four runs.

Sled	Athletes	Event	Run 1		Run 2		Run 3		Run 4		Total	
Sled	Athletes	Event	Time	Rank	Time	Rank	Time	Rank	Time	Rank	Time	Rank
JAM-1	Lascelles Brown; Winston Watts	Two-man	48.59	27	48.58	26	49.01	28	48.76	27	3:14.94	28
