= Skeleton at the 2018 Winter Olympics – Qualification =

The following were the criteria, rules, and standings for qualification for the Skeleton competitions at the 2018 Winter Olympics.

== Qualification rules ==
A maximum of 50 quota spots were available to athletes to compete at the games. A maximum 30 men and 20 women could qualify. The qualification was based on the combined rankings (across all four tours) of 14 January 2018 (after the seventh World Cup event of the season, in St. Moritz). Competitors had to have competed in five different races on three different tracks during the 2016/17 season or 2017/18 season. Males had to be in the top 60 of the world rankings, while women needed to be in the top 45, after eliminating non-quota-earning competitors from countries that have earned their maximum quota. Each continent (Africa, Americas, Asia, Europe and Oceania) and the hosts were allowed to enter a competitor provided they meet the above standard. If any of these automatic places had gone unfilled, they were reallocated to unrepresented countries with qualified competitors in order of ranking. Thirty men were allowed to compete (maximum of three NOCs with three and six NOCs with two). Twenty women were allowed to compete (maximum of two NOCs with three, four NOCs with two).

== Qualification timeline ==
Races from October 15, 2017 until January 14, 2018 applied to qualification for the Olympics. In general this meant that the Olympic field is established by using the first seven world cup races of the 2017-18 season, but also includes results from Intercontinental, Europe, and America cup races. Four competitors were then allocated in both competitions, first for the host (if not already qualified), and then for continents not previously represented. If a nation refused a quota it was reallocated. Unused or reallocated spots were filled on January 19, 2018 by nations not previously entered.

== Quota allocation ==
The following summary is a breakdown of Olympic qualification based on the IBSF rankings and adjustments, following reallocation. Numbers beside the nation indicate the rank of the sled that establishes the NOC's number of qualifiers.

=== Final summary ===
Nations	Men	Women	Athletes
Australia	1	1	2
Austria	1	1	2
Belgium	0	1	1
Canada	3	3	6
China	1	0	1
Germany	3	3	6
Ghana	1	0	1
Great Britain	2	2	4
Israel	1	0	1
Italy	1	0	1
Jamaica	1	0	1
Japan	2	1	3
Latvia	2	1	3
Netherlands	0	1	1
New Zealand	1	0	1
Nigeria	0	1	1
Norway	1	0	1
Olympic Athletes from Russia	2	0	2
Romania	1	1	2
South Korea	2	1	3
Switzerland	0	1	1
Ukraine	1	0	1
United States	2	2	4
Total: 23 NOCs	30	20	50

=== Men ===
Final rankings by nation.

Sleds qualified	Countries	Athletes total	Nation
3	2	6	Germany 7; ~~Olympic Athletes from Russia 14~~; Canada 23
2	6	12	Latvia 4 Olympic Athletes from Russia 9^{3} United States 16; Great Britain 20; South Korea 22; Japan 44; ~~Austria 45~~^{1}
1	11	11	Austria 11^{1} New Zealand 18; China 27; Spain 31; Australia 34; ~~Switzerland 39~~^{1} Italy 42; Romania 43; Ukraine 46; Norway 60^{1} Israel 61^{1} Jamaica 79^{3} Ghana 99^{2}
30	19	30	

1. Switzerland and Austria declined one quota each. Norway and Israel accepted reallocations.
2. Qualified as continental representative for Africa.
3. Olympic Athletes From Russia were permitted to enter only 2 spots (Nikita Tregubov and Vladislav Marchenkov) and excluded Alexander Tretiatov. This spot was reallocated to Jamaica.

=== Women ===
Final rankings by nation.

Sleds qualified	Countries	Athletes total	Nation
3	2	6	Canada 7 Germany 8
2	2	4	Great Britain 13; ~~Olympic Athletes from Russia 16~~^{5} United States 18; ~~Netherlands 22^{1}~~
1	10	10	Austria 9 Latvia 11; Belgium 12; Netherlands 14^{1} Switzerland 15^{1} Australia 20^{2} South Korea 32^{3} Japan 36^{5} Romania 41^{5} Nigeria 71^{4}
20	12	20	

1. Netherlands accepted one quota place but declined the second quota which was accepted by Switzerland
2. Australia qualified as a continental representative.
3. South Korea qualified as the host.
4. Nigeria qualified as a continental representative through the application of IBSF rule 4.1.
5. Olympic Athletes From Russia were not permitted to enter any women. These spots were reallocated to Romania and Japan.
