= Jamaica at the 2022 Winter Olympics =

- Flag of Jamaica
- IOC code: JAM
- NOC: Jamaica Olympic Association
- Website: www.joa.org.jm

in Beijing, China 4–20 February 2022
- Competitors: 7 (6 men and 1 woman) in 2 sports
- Flag bearers (opening): Benjamin Alexander; Jazmine Fenlator-Victorian
- Flag bearer (closing): Rolando Reid
- Medals: Gold 0 Silver 0 Bronze 0 Total 0

Winter Olympics appearances (overview)
- 1988; 1992; 1994; 1998; 2002; 2006; 2010; 2014; 2018; 2022; 2026

Jamaica competed at the 2022 Winter Olympics in Beijing, China, from 4 to 20 February 2022. It was the country's ninth appearance at the Winter Olympics, since its debut at the 1988 Winter Olympics in Calgary. The Jamaican delegation consisted of seven athletes competing in two sports. It did not win any medals at the Games.

== Background ==
The Jamaica Olympic Association was recognized by the International Olympic Committee (IOC) in 1936. Jamaica sent 14 athletes to the 1948 Summer Olympics held in London, and has since participated in every Summer Olympics. The nation made its first Winter Olympics appearance at the 1988 Winter Olympics in Calgary, and the 2022 Winter Olympics was the nation's ninth appearance at the Winter Olympics.

The 2022 Winter Olympics was held in Beijing, China, between 4 and 22 February 2022. Alpine skier Benjamin Alexander and bobsled athlete Jazmine Fenlator-Victorian were Jamaica's flagbearers during the opening ceremony. Rolando Reid was the flagbearer during the closing ceremony. Jamaica did not win a medal at the Games.

== Competitors ==
The Jamaican team consists of a seven athletes, competing in two sports.

Sport	Men	Women	Total
Alpine skiing	1	0	1
Bobsleigh	5	1	6
Total	6	1	7

== Alpine skiing ==
The basic qualification mark for the giant slalom event stipulated an average of less than 160 points in the list published by the International Ski Federation (FIS) as on 17 January 2022. The quotas were allocated further based on athletes satisfying other criteria with a maximum of 22 athletes (11 male and 11 female athletes) from a single participating NOC. Jamaican alpine skier Benjamin Alexander met the basic qualification standard in the giant slalom category. Subject to the other criteria, Alexander qualified to participate at the games.

This marked the country's debut in the sport at the Winter Olympics. He was born in the United Kingdom and took up the sport only in 2018.

In the giant slalom event held on 13 February 2022 at the Yanqing National Alpine Skiing Centre, Alexander completed his first run in 1:37.94 to rank 54th amongst the 87 competitors. Though he took longer to complete his second run in 1:40.58, he was ranked 46th. Overall, he finished in 46th position after the two runs.

Athlete	Event	Run 1		Run 2		Total	
Athlete	Event	Time	Rank	Time	Rank	Time	Rank
Benjamin Alexander	Men's giant slalom	1:37.94	54	1:40.58	46	3:18.52	46

== Bobsleigh ==
As per the International Bobsleigh & Skeleton Federation, a maximum of 170 quota spots were available to athletes to compete at the games including 124 for men and 46 for women. The qualification was based on the world rankings of the 2021/2022 season between 15 October 2020 and 16 January 2022. Pilots must have competed in six different races on three different tracks and been ranked in at least five of those races. Additionally, the pilot must been ranked among the top 50 for the man's events or top 40 for the women's events. Jamaica qualified three sleds (two-man, four-man and the women's monobob). By qualifying three sleds, Jamaica earned five athlete quota spots (five men and one woman) in the sport.

This marked the first time Jamaica has qualified in three events in bobsled. Jamaica's four-man bobsled qualified for their first games since Nagano 1998. While Jazmine Fenlator-Victorian returned for her second Olympic appearance, the mens' teams made their debut at the Games.

The bobsleigh events were held at the Yanqing National Alpine Skiing Centre between 13 and 20 February 2022. Fenlator-Victorian finished 20th and last in the women's monobob event. In the men's events, the two-men and four-men teams finished 30th and 28th respectively, and did not advance to the final run.

Athletes	Event	Run 1		Run 2		Run 3		Run 4		Total	
Athletes	Event	Time	Rank	Time	Rank	Time	Rank	Time	Rank	Time	Rank
Shanwayne Stephens*; Nimroy Turgott	Two-man	1:01.23	30	1:01.35	28	1:01.54	30	Did not advance		3:04.12	30
Shanwayne Stephens*; Ashley Watson; Rolando Reid; Matthew Wekpe	Four-man	1:00.80	28	1:01.39	28	1:01.23	28	Did not advance		3:03.42	28
Jazmine Fenlator-Victorian	Women's monobob	1:06.63	19	1:07.38	19	1:06.92	19	1:07.63	20	4:28.56	19

* – Denotes the driver of each sled

== See also ==
- Tropical nations at the Winter Olympics
