= Jamaica at the 2004 Summer Olympics =

- IOC code: JAM
- NOC: Jamaica Olympic Association
- Website: www.joa.org.jm

in Athens
- Competitors: 47 in 4 sports
- Flag bearer: Sandie Richards
- Medals Ranked 34th: Gold 2 Silver 1 Bronze 2 Total 5

Summer Olympics appearances (overview)
- 1948; 1952; 1956; 1960; 1964; 1968; 1972; 1976; 1980; 1984; 1988; 1992; 1996; 2000; 2004; 2008; 2012; 2016; 2020; 2024

Other related appearances
- British West Indies (1960 S)

Jamaica competed at the 2004 Summer Olympics in Athens, Greece, from 13 to 29 August 2004. This was the nation's fourteenth appearance at the Summer Olympics as an independent nation, although it had previously appeared in the first four editions as a British colony, and as part of the West Indies Federation. The Jamaica Olympic Association sent a total of 47 athletes to the Games, 22 men and 25 women, to compete only in track and field (the largest ever by sport), badminton, shooting, and swimming. For the second consecutive time in Olympic history, Jamaica was represented again by more female than male athletes.

With Merlene Ottey's sudden demise to compete for Slovenia at these Games, the Jamaican team featured several Olympic medalists from Sydney, including track hurdler Danny McFarlane and sprinter Sandie Richards, who followed Ottey's path as another Jamaican athlete to compete in five Olympic Games since her debut in 1988. Being the oldest and the most sophisticated athlete of the team, Richards was appointed by the committee to become the nation's flag bearer in the opening ceremony. Other notable Jamaican athletes also featured the Atkinson swimming clan Janelle, Jevon, and Alia, and top medal favorite Asafa Powell in the men's 100 metres.

Jamaica left Athens with a sterling record of five medals (two golds, one silver, and two bronze), being marked as an enormous improvement from Sydney, where the nation failed to claim a single gold. After picking up the first Olympic medal of her illustrious career, sprinter Veronica Campbell sought her sights to break a historic milestone as she became the first Jamaican athlete in history to claim an individual Olympic title in the women's 200 metres. She was also named the most decorated Jamaican athlete of the Games, after helping out her relay team produce a brilliant finish with their second gold and collecting the bronze earlier in the 100 metres. Meanwhile, Danny McFarlane added a second silver to his Olympic career hardware in the men's 400 metres hurdles, finishing behind Dominican Republic's Félix Sánchez by only a few hurdles left in the track.

== Medalists ==
Medal	Name	Sport	Event	Date
Gold	Veronica Campbell	Athletics	Women's 200 m	August 25
Gold	Aleen Bailey; Veronica Campbell; Tayna Lawrence; Beverly McDonald*; Sherone Simpson	Athletics	Women's 4 × 100 m relay	August 27
Silver	Danny McFarlane	Athletics	Men's 400 m hurdles	August 26
Bronze	Veronica Campbell	Athletics	Women's 100 m	August 21
Bronze	Michelle Burgher; Nadia Davy; Sandie Richards; Ronetta Smith*; Novlene Williams	Athletics	Women's 4 × 400 m relay	August 28

== Athletics ==
Jamaican athletes have so far achieved qualifying standards in the following athletics events (up to a maximum of 3 athletes in each event at the 'A' Standard, and 1 at the 'B' Standard).

Key

- Note–Ranks given for track events are within the athlete's heat only
- Q = Qualified for the next round
- q = Qualified for the next round as a fastest loser or, in field events, by position without achieving the qualifying target
- NR = National record
- N/A = Round not applicable for the event
- Bye = Athlete not required to compete in round

Men
Track & road events

Athlete	Event	Heat		Quarterfinal		Semifinal		Final	
Athlete	Event	Result	Rank	Result	Rank	Result	Rank	Result	Rank
Michael Frater	100 m	10.20	2 Q	10.11	3 Q	10.29	6	Did not advance	
Asafa Powell	100 m	10.06	1 Q	9.99	2 Q	9.95	1 Q	9.94	5
Dwight Thomas	100 m	10.21	2 Q	10.12	3 Q	10.28	7	Did not advance	
Usain Bolt	200 m	21.05	5	Did not advance					
Asafa Powell	200 m	20.77	4 Q	20.23	2 Q	20.56	4 Q	DNS	
Christopher Williams	200 m	20.57	2 Q	20.34	4 q	20.80	6	Did not advance	
Michael Blackwood	400 m	45.23	1 Q	—		45.00	2 Q	45.55	8
Davian Clarke	400 m	45.54	2 Q	—		45.27	2 Q	44.83	6
Brandon Simpson	400 m	45.61	2 Q	—		44.97	1 Q	44.76	5
Richard Phillips	110 m hurdles	13.39	2 Q	13.44	3 Q	13.47	6	Did not advance	
Chris Pinnock	110 m hurdles	13.42	3 Q	13.47	4 q	13.57	8	Did not advance	
Maurice Wignall	110 m hurdles	13.30	1 Q	13.39	3 Q	13.17 NR	1 Q	13.21	4
Dean Griffiths	400 m Hurdles	49.41	5 q	—		49.51	8	Did not advance	
Danny McFarlane	400 m Hurdles	48.53	1 Q	—		48.00	1 Q	48.11	2nd place, silver medalist(s)
Kemel Thompson	400 m Hurdles	48.66	1 Q	—		48.25	4	Did not advance	
Michael Frater; Patrick Jarrett; Winston Smith; Dwight Thomas	4 × 100 m relay	38.71	4	—				Did not advance	
Michael Blackwood; Michael Campbell; Davian Clarke; Jermaine Gonzales	4 × 400 m relay	DSQ		—				Did not advance	

Field events

Athlete	Event	Qualification		Final	
Athlete	Event	Distance	Position	Distance	Position
James Beckford	Long jump	8.20	4 Q	8.31	4

Combined events – Decathlon

Athlete	Event	100 m	LJ	SP	HJ	400 m	110H	DT	PV	JT	1500 m	Final	Rank
Claston Bernard	Result	10.69	7.48	14.80	2.12	49.13	14.17	44.75	4.40	55.27	4:36.31	8225 NR	9
Claston Bernard	Points	931	930	777	915	855	953	762	731	667	704	8225 NR	9
Maurice Smith	Result	10.85	6.81	15.24	1.91	49.27	14.01	49.02	4.20	61.52	4:32.74	8023	14
Maurice Smith	Points	894	769	804	723	849	973	850	673	761	727	8023	14

Women
Track & road events

Athlete	Event	Heat		Quarterfinal		Semifinal		Final	
Athlete	Event	Result	Rank	Result	Rank	Result	Rank	Result	Rank
Aleen Bailey	100 m	11.20	1 Q	11.12	2 Q	11.13	3 Q	11.05	5
Veronica Campbell	100 m	11.17	1 Q	11.18	2 Q	10.93	2 Q	10.97	3rd place, bronze medalist(s)
Sherone Simpson	100 m	11.27	2 Q	11.09	1 Q	11.03	2 Q	11.07	6
Aleen Bailey	200 m	22.73	1 Q	22.97	2 Q	22.33	2 Q	22.42	4
Veronica Campbell	200 m	22.59	1 Q	22.49	1 Q	22.13	1 Q	22.05	1st place, gold medalist(s)
Beverly McDonald	200 m	22.90	2 Q	22.99	3 Q	23.02	6	Did not advance	
Allison Beckford	400 m	52.85	5	—		Did not advance			
Nadia Davy	400 m	52.04	4	—		Did not advance			
Novlene Williams	400 m	50.59	3 Q	—		50.85	3	Did not advance	
Michelle Ballentine	800 m	2:01.52	3 Q	—		2:00.94	8	Did not advance	
Delloreen Ennis-London	100 m hurdles	12.77	2 Q	—		12.60	5	Did not advance	
Brigitte Foster	100 m hurdles	12.83	1 Q	—		DNS		Did not advance	
Lacena Golding-Clarke	100 m hurdles	12.86	3 q	—		12.69	3 Q	12.73	5
Patricia Allen	400 m hurdles	56.40	6	—		Did not advance			
Debbie-Ann Parris-Thymes	400 m hurdles	55.21	4 q	—		54.99	7	Did not advance	
Shevon Stoddart	400 m hurdles	56.61	5	—		Did not advance			
Aleen Bailey; Veronica Campbell; Tayna Lawrence; Beverly McDonald*; Sherone Simpson	4 × 100 m relay	42.20	2 Q	—				41.73 NR	1st place, gold medalist(s)
Michelle Burgher; Nadia Davy; Sandie Richards; Ronetta Smith*; Novlene Williams	4 × 400 m relay	3:24.92	2 Q	—				3:22.00	3rd place, bronze medalist(s)

* Competed only in heats and received medals

Field events

Athlete	Event	Qualification		Final	
Athlete	Event	Distance	Position	Distance	Position
Trecia Smith	Triple jump	14.65	7 Q	15.02	4
Kimberly Barrett	Shot put	16.45	27	Did not advance	

== Badminton ==
Athlete	Event	Round of 32	Round of 16	Quarterfinal	Semifinal	Final / BM	
Athlete	Event	Opposition Score	Opposition Score	Opposition Score	Opposition Score	Opposition Score	Rank
Nigella Saunders	Women's singles	Audina (NED); L 4–11, 1–11	Did not advance				

== Shooting ==
Jamaica has qualified a single shooter.

Women

Athlete	Event	Qualification		Final	
Athlete	Event	Points	Rank	Points	Rank
Dawn Kobayashi	10 m air rifle	383	=41	Did not advance	

== Swimming ==
Jamaican swimmers earned qualifying standards in the following events (up to a maximum of 2 swimmers in each event at the A-standard time, and 1 at the B-standard time):

Men

Athlete	Event	Heat		Semifinal		Final	
Athlete	Event	Time	Rank	Time	Rank	Time	Rank
Jevon Atkinson	50 m freestyle	23.61	51	Did not advance			

Women

Athlete	Event	Heat		Semifinal		Final	
Athlete	Event	Time	Rank	Time	Rank	Time	Rank
Alia Atkinson	50 m freestyle	27.21	44	Did not advance			
Alia Atkinson	100 m breaststroke	1:12.53	32	Did not advance			
Janelle Atkinson	200 m freestyle	2:04.06	30	Did not advance			
Janelle Atkinson	400 m freestyle	4:20.00	28	—		Did not advance	
Angela Chuck	100 m freestyle	58.33	39	Did not advance			

== See also ==
- Jamaica at the 2003 Pan American Games
- Jamaica at the 2004 Summer Paralympics
