= Jamaica at the 1948 Summer Olympics =

- IOC code: JAM
- NOC: Jamaica Olympic Association

in London
- Competitors: 13 in 3 sports
- Medals Ranked 20th: Gold 1 Silver 2 Bronze 0 Total 3

Summer Olympics appearances (overview)
- 1948; 1952; 1956; 1960; 1964; 1968; 1972; 1976; 1980; 1984; 1988; 1992; 1996; 2000; 2004; 2008; 2012; 2016; 2020; 2024; 2028

Other related appearances
- British West Indies (1960 S)

Jamaica sent a delegation to compete at the 1948 Summer Olympics in London, England from 29 July to 14 August 1948. This was the nation's first appearance at the Summer Olympic Games since they became a member of the International Olympic Committee back in 1936.

Jamaica delegation's consisted of 13 competitors competing in three sports with 10 of them competing in the athletics where they recorded their first medal in Olympic history when Arthur Wint secured a silver medal in the men's 800 metres before claiming the nation's first gold medal three days later in the 400 metres as he finished ahead of fellow Jamaican Herb McKenley. The other three competitors competed in the boxing and weightlifting respectively as the nation finished 20th in the standings.

== Medalists ==
=== Gold ===
- Arthur Wint — Athletics, men's 400 metres

=== Silver ===
- Herb McKenley — Athletics, men's 400 metres
- Arthur Wint — Athletics, men's 800 metres
