= Jamaica at the 1956 Summer Olympics =

- IOC code: JAM
- NOC: Jamaica Olympic Association

in Melbourne/Stockholm
- Competitors: 10 in 1 sport
- Medals: Gold 0 Silver 0 Bronze 0 Total 0

Summer Olympics appearances (overview)
- 1948; 1952; 1956; 1960; 1964; 1968; 1972; 1976; 1980; 1984; 1988; 1992; 1996; 2000; 2004; 2008; 2012; 2016; 2020; 2024

Other related appearances
- British West Indies (1960 S)

Jamaica competed at the 1956 Summer Olympics in Melbourne, Australia.

== Results by event ==
=== Athletics ===
Men

Athlete	Event	Heat		Quarterfinal		Semifinal		Final	
Athlete	Event	Result	Rank	Result	Rank	Result	Rank	Result	Rank
Keith Gardner	110m hurdles	14.6	did not advance						
