= Jamaica at the 1980 Summer Olympics =

- IOC code: JAM
- NOC: Jamaica Olympic Association

in Moscow
- Competitors: 18 (11 men, 7 women) in 2 sports
- Medals Ranked 34th: Gold 0 Silver 0 Bronze 3 Total 3

Summer Olympics appearances (overview)
- 1948; 1952; 1956; 1960; 1964; 1968; 1972; 1976; 1980; 1984; 1988; 1992; 1996; 2000; 2004; 2008; 2012; 2016; 2020; 2024

Other related appearances
- British West Indies (1960 S)

Jamaica competed at the 1980 Summer Olympics in Moscow, USSR. 18 competitors, 11 men and 7 women, took part in 15 events in 2 sports. The Russian alphabet and Japan's participation in the American-led boycott of the games placed it last before the host nation in the Parade of Nations.

== Medalists ==
=== Bronze ===
- Don Quarrie – Athletics, Men's 200 metres
- Merlene Ottey-Page – Athletics, Women's 200 metres
- David Weller – Cycling, Men's 1.000 metres Time Trial

== Athletics ==
Men's 100 metres

- Don Quarrie

- Heat – 10.37
- Quarterfinals – 10.29
- Semifinals – 10.55 (→ did not advance)

Men's 800 metres

- Owen Hamilton

- Heat – 1:49.3
- Semifinals – 1:47.6 (→ did not advance)

Men's 4x400 metres Relay

- Derrick Peynado, Colin Bradford, Ian Stapleton, and Bert Cameron

- Heat – did not finish (→ did not advance)

Men's High Jump

- Desmond Morris

- Qualification – 2.10 m (→ did not advance)

Women's 100 metres

- Rosie Allwood

- Heat – 11.68
- Quarterfinals – 11.69 (→ did not advance)

- Lelieth Hodges

- Heat – 11.79 (→ did not advance)

Women's Long Jump

- Dorothy Scott

- Qualifying Round – 5.83 m (→ did not advance, 17th place)

== Cycling ==
Two cyclists represented Jamaica in 1980. David Weller won bronze in the 1000m time trial event.

Individual road race

- Peter Aldridge

1000m time trial

- David Weller
