= Jamaica at the 1952 Summer Olympics =

- IOC code: JAM
- NOC: Jamaica Olympic Association

in Helsinki
- Flag bearer: Arthur Wint
- Medals Ranked 13th: Gold 2 Silver 3 Bronze 0 Total 5

Summer Olympics appearances (overview)
- 1948; 1952; 1956; 1960; 1964; 1968; 1972; 1976; 1980; 1984; 1988; 1992; 1996; 2000; 2004; 2008; 2012; 2016; 2020; 2024

Other related appearances
- British West Indies (1960 S)

Jamaica competed at the 1952 Summer Olympics in Helsinki, Finland.

== Medalists ==
=== Gold ===
- Arthur Wint, Leslie Laing, Herb McKenley, and George Rhoden — Athletics, Men's 4 x 400 metres relay
- George Rhoden — Athletics, Men's 400 metres

=== Silver ===
- Herb McKenley — Athletics, Men's 100 metres
- Herb McKenley — Athletics, Men's 400 metres
- Arthur Wint — Athletics, Men's 800 metres

== Results and competitors by event ==
=== Athletics ===
Men's 100 metres

- Herb McKenley

- First Round – 10.7
- First Round – 10.5
- Semifinals – 10.4
- Final – 10.4 (→ Silver Medal)

=== Cycling ===
==== Track Competition ====
Men's 1.000m Time Trial

- Kenneth Farnum

- Final — 1:17.2 (→ 20th place)

Men's 1.000m Sprint Scratch Race

- Kenneth Farnum — 21st place

== Sources ==
- Official Olympic Reports
- International Olympic Committee results database
