= Jamaica at the 1968 Summer Olympics =

- IOC code: JAM
- NOC: Jamaica Olympic Association

in Mexico City
- Medals Ranked 39th: Gold 0 Silver 1 Bronze 0 Total 1

Summer Olympics appearances (overview)
- 1948; 1952; 1956; 1960; 1964; 1968; 1972; 1976; 1980; 1984; 1988; 1992; 1996; 2000; 2004; 2008; 2012; 2016; 2020; 2024; 2028

Other related appearances
- British West Indies (1960 S)

Jamaica competed at the 1968 Summer Olympics in Mexico City, Mexico.

== Medalists ==
Medal	Name	Sport	Event	Date
Silver	Lennox Miller	Athletics	Men's 100 metres	October 14

== Swimming ==
Men

Athlete	Event	Heat		Semifinal		Final	
Athlete	Event	Time	Rank	Time	Rank	Time	Rank
Paul Nash	100 m freestyle	59.0	=53	Did not advance			

== Weightlifting ==
Athlete	Event	Weight	Rank
Cedric Demetris	82.5 kg	DNF	
