= Jamaica at the 1964 Summer Olympics =

- IOC code: JAM
- NOC: Jamaica Olympic Association

in Tokyo
- Competitors: 21 (17 men, 4 women) in 4 sports
- Medals: Gold 0 Silver 0 Bronze 0 Total 0

Summer Olympics appearances (overview)
- 1948; 1952; 1956; 1960; 1964; 1968; 1972; 1976; 1980; 1984; 1988; 1992; 1996; 2000; 2004; 2008; 2012; 2016; 2020; 2024

Other related appearances
- British West Indies (1960 S)

Jamaica competed at the 1964 Summer Olympics in Tokyo, Japan. This was the first time Jamaica had competed in the Olympics since independence in 1962. 21 competitors, 17 men and 4 women, took part in 16 events in 4 sports.

== Shooting ==
One shooter represented Jamaica in 1964.

50 m pistol

- Tony Bridge
