= Jamaica at the 1976 Summer Olympics =

- IOC code: JAM
- NOC: Jamaica Olympic Association

in Montreal
- Competitors: 20 (11 men, 9 women)
- Flag bearer: Don Quarrie
- Medals Ranked 21st: Gold 1 Silver 1 Bronze 0 Total 2

Summer Olympics appearances (overview)
- 1948; 1952; 1956; 1960; 1964; 1968; 1972; 1976; 1980; 1984; 1988; 1992; 1996; 2000; 2004; 2008; 2012; 2016; 2020; 2024

Other related appearances
- British West Indies (1960 S)

Jamaica competed at the 1976 Summer Olympics in Montreal, Quebec, Canada. 20 competitors, 11 men and 9 women, took part in 18 events in 3 sports.

== Medalists ==
=== Gold ===
- Don Quarrie – Athletics, Men's 200 metres

=== Silver ===
- Don Quarrie – Athletics, Men's 100 metres

== Athletics ==
Men's 800 metres

- Seymour Newman

- Heat – 1:48.46
- Semi Final – 1:47.22 (→ did not advance)

Men's 4 × 400 m Relay

- Leighton Priestley, Donald Quarrie, Colin Bradford, and Seymour Newman

- Heat – 3:03.86
- Final – 3:02.84 (→ 5th place)

== Cycling ==
Three cyclists represented Jamaica in 1976.

Individual road race

- Errol Walters – did not finish (→ no ranking)

Sprint

- Xavier Mirander – 16th place

1000m time trial

- David Weller – 1:08.534 (→ 11th place)
