= Michael McKay (cyclist) =

Personal information
- Born: 17 May 1964 (age 62)

Cycling career
- Sport: Cycling

Michael Hugh McKay (born 17 May 1964) is a retired Jamaican cyclist who competed for Jamaica at the 1992 Summer Olympics in the Men's Individual Road Race.
