= Michael Morgan (bobsleigh) =

Jamaican bobsledder

Personal information
- Nationality: Jamaican
- Born: 30 December 1961 (age 63)

Sport
- Sport: Bobsleigh

Michael Morgan (born 30 December 1961) is a Jamaican bobsledder. He competed in the two man event at the 1998 Winter Olympics.
