= Jamaica Rifle Association =

Jamaican Rifle Association

- Abbreviation: JRA
- Parent organization: IPSC, ISSF, WAF, ICFRA

Jamaica Rifle Association was founded in 1896 and is the umbrella organization for sport shooting in Jamaica, being a member of the international organizations:

- International Practical Shooting Confederation (IPSC)
- International Confederation of Fullbore Rifle Associations (ICFRA)
- International Shooting Sport Federation (ISSF)
- World Archery Federation (WAF)
