= Michael White (bobsleigh) =

Jamaican bobsledder

Personal information
- Nationality: Jamaican
- Born: 5 November 1964 (age 60)

Sport
- Sport: Bobsleigh

Michael White (born 5 November 1964) is a Jamaican bobsledder. He competed at the 1988 Winter Olympics and the 1992 Winter Olympics.
