= Jamaica at the 2026 Winter Olympics =

- Flag of Jamaica
- IOC code: JAM
- NOC: Jamaica Olympic Association
- Website: www.joa.org.jm

in Milan and Cortina d'Ampezzo, Italy 6–22 February 2026
- Competitors: 6 (5 men and 1 woman) in 2 sports
- Flag bearers (opening): Henri Rivers IV; Mica Moore
- Flag bearer (closing): Volunteer
- Medals: Gold 0 Silver 0 Bronze 0 Total 0

Winter Olympics appearances (overview)
- 1988; 1992; 1994; 1998; 2002; 2006; 2010; 2014; 2018; 2022; 2026

Jamaica competed at the 2026 Winter Olympics in Milan and Cortina d'Ampezzo, Italy, from 6 to 22 February 2026. It was the country's tenth appearance at the Winter Olympics, since its debut at the 1988 Winter Olympics in Calgary. The Jamaican delegation consisted of seven athletes competing in two sports. It did not win any medals at the Games.

== Background ==
The Jamaica Olympic Association was recognized by the International Olympic Committee (IOC) in 1936. Jamaica made its first Winter Olympics appearance at the 1988 Winter Olympics in Calgary, and the 2026 Winter Olympics was the country's tenth appearance at the Winter Olympics.

The 2026 Winter Olympics was held in Milan and Cortina d'Ampezzo, Italy, between 6 and 22 February 2026. Sports administrator Gregory Moore was the chef de mission for the Games. Alpine skier Henri Rivers IV and bobsleigh athlete Mica Moore were Jamaica's flagbearers during the opening ceremony. As no Jamaican athletes were present for the closing ceremony, a volunteer carried Jamaica's flag. Jamaica did not win a medal at the Games.

== Competitors ==
The Jamaican team consisted of six athletes (five male and one female) competing in two sports.

Sport	Men	Women	Total
Alpine skiing	1	0	1
Bobsleigh	4	1	5
Total	5	1	6

== Alpine skiing ==
As per the International Ski and Snowboard Federation (FIS), the basic qualification mark for the slalom event required a points average of less than 120 in the FIS points list, calculated on the basis of results between 1 July 2024 and 18 January 2026. Every NOC meeting the minimum basic standards was assigned one male and one female quota spot. Jamaica qualified one male alpine skier through the basic quota for the slalom event.

Henri Rivers IV was born in New York City, to a Jamaican-born mother. Both his parents were ski instructors. He became the second Jamaican to compete in alpine skiing at the Winter Olympics, following Benjamin Alexander at the 2022 Winter Olympics. He competed in the men's slalom event held at the Stelvio Ski Centre, Bormio on 16 February. However, he did not complete his first run and was not classified in the final list.

Men

Athlete	Event	Run 1		Run 2		Total	
Athlete	Event	Time	Rank	Time	Rank	Time	Rank
Henri Rivers IV	Men's slalom	Did not finish					

== Bobsleigh ==
As per the International Bobsleigh & Skeleton Federation, a maximum of 170 quota spots were available to athletes to compete at the games including 114 for men and 56 for women. The qualification was based on the combined ranking list of the 2025/2026 season until the deadline of 18 January 2026. Pilots must have competed in eight different races on three different tracks between 1 October 2024 and 18 January 2026, and should have been ranked in at least five of those races. Additionally, the pilot must been ranked among the top 50 for the man's events or top 40 for the women's events. Jamaica qualified three sleds (two-man, four-man and the women's monobob), earning six athlete quota spots in the sport (five men and one woman).

Mica Moore, who participated in women's monobob, had previously competed at the 2018 Winter Olympics representing Great Britain, and received Jamaican citizenship in December 2024. All the members of the mens' teams made their Olympic debut. Prior to the Games, the four-men team consisting of Shane Pitter, Andrae Dacres, Junior Harris and Tyquendo Tracey had won Jamaica's first-ever gold medal at any international bobsleigh race, at the North American Cup in Whistler in November 2025.

The bobsleigh events were held at the Cortina Sliding Centre in Cortina d'Ampezzo between 15 and 22 February 2026. Moore finished 14th in the women's monobob, equaling the highest-ever Olympic placement by a Jamaica in bobsleigh achieved by the four men team in the 1988 Winter Olympics and the best-ever result by a Jamaican female bobsleigher at the Olympics.

In the men's events, the two-man team of Pitter and Harris finished 22nd out of 25 teams, and did not advance to the final run. The four-man team of Pitter, Harris, Tracey and Joel Fearon finished joint-21st out of 27 teams with a total time of 2:46.02 after three runs and did not advance to the final run.

Athletes	Event	Run 1		Run 2		Run 3		Run 4		Total	
Athletes	Event	Time	Rank	Time	Rank	Time	Rank	Time	Rank	Time	Rank
Shane Pitter*; Junior Harris	Two-man	56.68	22	56.72	23	55.97	17	Did not advance		2:49.37	22
Shane Pitter*; Junior Harris; Tyquendo Tracey; Joel Fearon	Four-man	55.28	23	55.29	19	55.45	21	Did not advance		2:46.02	21
Mica Moore	Women's monobob	1:00.55	17	1:00.43	14	1:00.41	17	59.92	13	4:01.31	14

* – Denotes the driver of each sled

== See also ==
- Tropical nations at the Winter Olympics
