= Ricky McIntosh =

Jamaican bobsledder

Personal information
- Nationality: Jamaican
- Born: 26 October 1967 (age 57)

Sport
- Sport: Bobsleigh

Ricky McIntosh (born 26 October 1967) is a Jamaican bobsledder. He competed in the two man and the four man events at the 1992 Winter Olympics.

Olympic Games
Preceded by Juliet Cuthbert	Flag bearer for Jamaica; Nagano 1998	Succeeded by Deon Hemmings
