= Juliet Cuthbert =

Jamaican athlete (born 1964)

The Honourable Juliet Cuthbert-Flynn OD MP
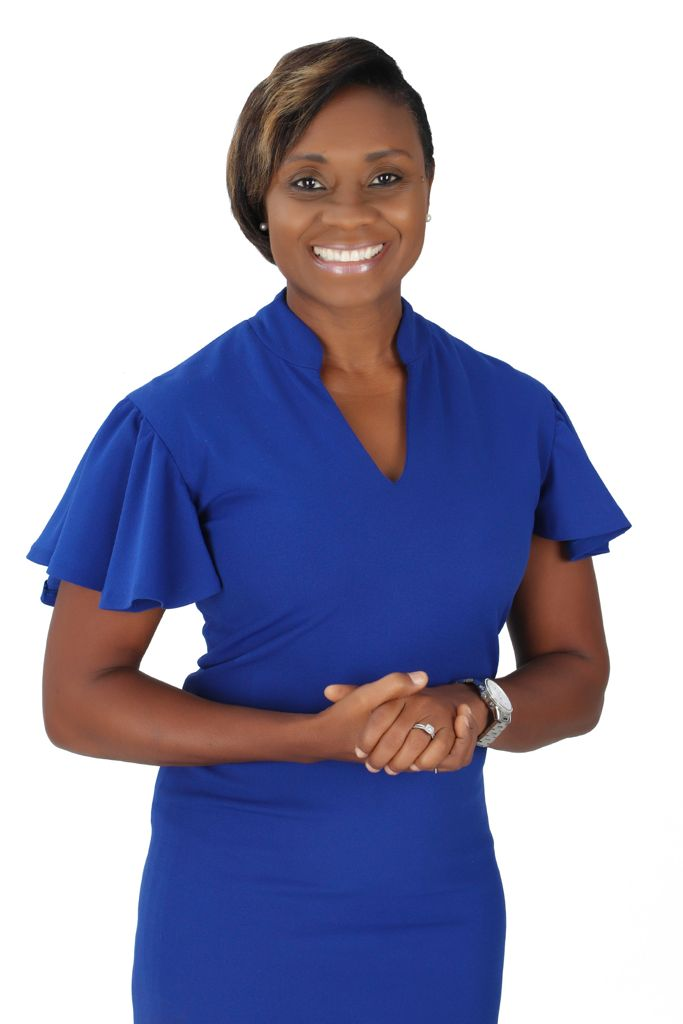

Minister of State in the Ministry of National Security
- Incumbent
- Assumed office September 2025
- Minister: Horace Chang
- Constituency: St Andrew East Rural

Member of Parliament for St Andrew West Rural
- Incumbent
- Assumed office 25 February 2020
- Prime Minister: Andrew Holness
- Preceded by: Paul Buchanan

Minister of State in the Ministry of Health and Wellness
- In office 14 September 2020 – May 2023
- Prime Minister: Andrew Holness
- Minister: Christopher Tufton

Personal details
- Born: Juliet Samantha Cuthbert; 9 April 1964 (age 62) Saint Thomas, Jamaica
- Party: Jamaica Labour Party
- Education: University of Texas at Austin, Olney High School, Morant Bay High School
- Sports career
- Country: Jamaica
- Sport: Track and field
Medal record
Women's athletics
Representing Jamaica
Olympic Games
Silver medal – second place	1992 Barcelona	100 m
Silver medal – second place	1992 Barcelona	200 m
Bronze medal – third place	1996 Atlanta	4 × 100 m relay
World Championships
Gold medal – first place	1991 Tokyo	4 × 100 meter relay
Silver medal – second place	1995 Gothenburg	4 × 100 m relay
Silver medal – second place	1997 Athens	4 × 100 m relay
Bronze medal – third place	1983 Helsinki	4 × 100 m relay
World Indoor Championships
Silver medal – second place	1997 Paris	200 m

Juliet Samantha Cuthbert-Flynn, née Cuthbert, (born 9 April 1964) is a Jamaican politician and retired track and field sprinter who competed in the 100 metres and 200 metres. As an athlete, Cuthbert-Flynn competed at four Olympic Games, winning two silver medals at the 1992 games held in Barcelona.

As a politician, she has been the Jamaica Labour Party's candidate and Member of Parliament for the St. Andrew West Rural constituency, defeating the People's National Party candidate Hugh Buchanan in Jamaica's general elections held February 25, 2016. She went on to defeat the People's National Party Krystal Tomlinson to win a second term as Member of Parliament for the St. Andrew West Rural constituency, in the September 3, 2020 General Election. She was appointed State Minister in the Ministry of Health and Wellness following her reelection when Prime Minister Andrew Holness selected his new slate of Cabinet Ministers.

== Education ==
Cuthbert attended Morant Bay High School and later Olney High School in Philadelphia and the University of Texas in Austin, Texas.

While at Texas, she won the Broderick Award (later referred to as the Honda-Broderick Award and now the Honda Sports Award) as the nation's best female collegiate track and field competitor in 1986.

== Career ==
=== Athletics ===
Cuthbert competed for her native country of Jamaica in the 1992 Summer Olympics held in Barcelona, Spain, in both the 100 meter sprint and the 200 meter sprint, winning the silver medals in both competitions. After running a good second leg in the 4 × 100 meter sprint relay final, Cuthbert injured a muscle in her leg before she competed in the second chance and dropped out of the race. This was a disappointing finish to the Summer Olympic Games for her and the other women of the Jamaican relay team. In 1992, Cuthbert was voted Jamaican "Sportswoman of the Year".

Four years later, at the Atlanta Olympic Games of 1996, Cuthbert helped the Jamaican 4 × 100 meter sprint relay team along with Michelle Freeman, Nikole Mitchell, and Merlene Ottey finish in third place and win the bronze medal.

With the Jamaican sprint relay team, Cuthbert also won a gold medal (1991) and two silver medals (1995, 1997) at World Championships in Athletics (actually, track and field).

=== Politics ===
In 2014, Cuthbert-Flynn entered politics when the Jamaica Labour Party introduced Cuthbert-Flynn to the media at the Jamaica Labour Party's 71st anniversary celebration press conference and re-launch of the party's website at its Belmont Road Headquarters in St. Andrew. It was later announced that she would become the party's standard-bearer in the St. Andrew West Rural constituency. She was appointed by then Opposition Leader Andrew Holness as Junior Opposition Spokesperson for Health and Healthy Living.

On February 25, 2016 General Election, she went on to defeat the People's National Party's incumbent Paul Buchanan, becoming the first Olympian elected to Jamaica's Parliament. Throughout her time as a legislator, she has pushed for the legalisation of abortion in Jamaica and has been a strong advocate for the women in the population. She was re-elected for a second term to continue representing the St. Andrew West Rural constituency in the September 3, 2020 General Elections. Cuthbert-Flynn defeated the People's National Party Krystal Tomlinson, widening her victory margin from her 2016 election win. Cuthbert-Flynn was appointed State Minister in the Ministry of Health and Wellness on September 12, 2020, to serve alongside Dr Christopher Tufton who is the portfolio minister. As State Minister in the Ministry of Health and Wellness, Cuthbert-Flynn is primarily responsible for Maternal Health, HIV Prevention and the reduction of Drug Abuse.

== International competitions ==
Year	Competition	Venue	Position	Event	Notes
Representing Jamaica
1978	CARIFTA Games (U-17)	Nassau, Bahamas	3rd	100 m	12.38 (-0.1 m/s)
1980	CARIFTA Games (U-17)	Hamilton, Bermuda	1st	100 m	12.0
1980	CARIFTA Games (U-17)	Hamilton, Bermuda	2nd	200 m	25.58
1980	Central American and Caribbean Junior Championships (U-17)	Nassau, Bahamas	2nd	100 m	12.0
1980	Central American and Caribbean Junior Championships (U-17)	Nassau, Bahamas	4th	200 m	25.3

Olympic Games
Preceded by Chris Stokes	Flag bearer for Jamaica; Atlanta 1996	Succeeded by Ricky McIntosh
