= Devon Harris =

Jamaican bobsledder (born 1964)

Devon Harris OLY
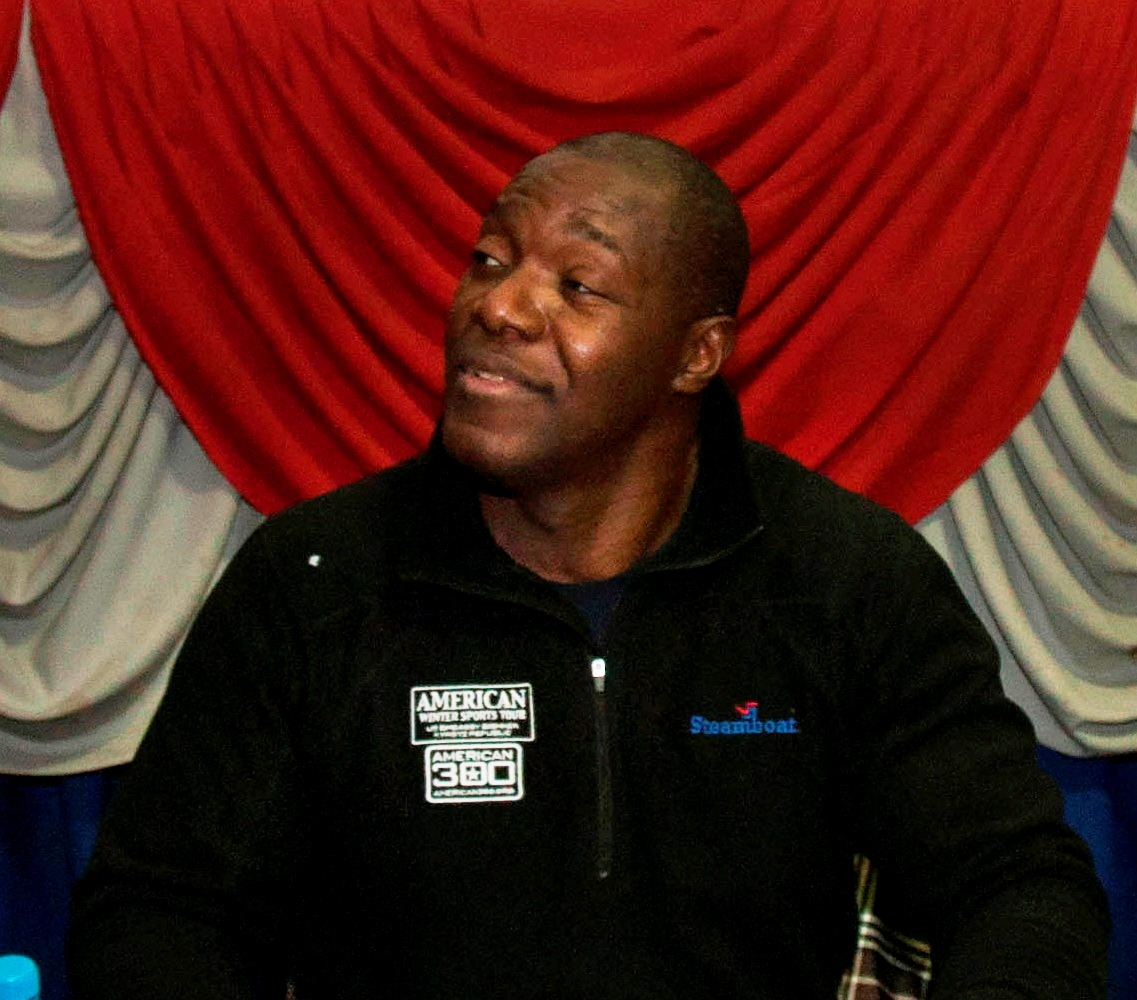

Personal information
- Full name: Devon Desmond Harris
- Born: December 5, 1964 (age 61) Jamaica
- Height: 1.78 m (5 ft 10 in)
- Weight: 97 kg (214 lb)

Sport
- Country: Jamaica
- Sport: Bobsleigh
- Team: Jamaican Bobsleigh
- Military career
- Branch: Jamaica Defence Force
- Service years: 1985–1992
- Rank: Lieutenant; Captain
- Unit: Second Battalion

Devon Harris OLY (born 1964), is a Jamaican retired bobsledder and military officer. He was one of the founding members of the Jamaica national bobsled team, which first competed in the 1988 Winter Olympics in Calgary, Alberta. Nicknamed "Pele" after the famous football star, Harris went on to compete in the 1992 Winter Olympics and the 1998 Winter Olympics. He currently resides in Congers, New York.

== Early life ==
Harris was born in Jamaica in 1964. He grew up in the Kingston ghetto of Sunrise Drive in Olympic Gardens (known as "Waterhouse," or "Firehouse," because it was a volatile area). A graduate of Drews Ave Primary School, Ardenne High School, and Royal Military Academy Sandhurst, Harris had been an avid football player and track and field participant, with his dream being to represent Jamaica in the 1984 Summer Olympics in the 800m and 1500m events.

== Olympics ==
When the idea for a Jamaican Bobsled Team was pitched to the Jamaica Defense Force, Harris was a lieutenant in the Second Battalion. He first came across the proposal in a weekly army publication called "Force Orders" in September 1987. The text had called for those who wished to "undergo rigorous and dangerous training" to represent Jamaica in the Winter Olympics. Harris initially thought the idea was ridiculous, but was eventually convinced to participate by his colonel, Lt. Col Alan Douglas. At the team selections, Harris ended up with the fastest push time.

Harris returned to the military after Calgary and later became a civilian in 1992 after his second Olympics in Albertville, France. He also competed in the 1998 Olympics in Nagano, Japan.

During the 2018 Olympic Games in PyeongChang, Devon was honored by the World Olympians Association and inducted as an Olympian For Life in recognition of the significant contribution he has made to society in inspiring others to never give up.

== Personal life ==
Harris currently works as a motivational public speaker and writer. In 2006, Harris founded the Keep On Pushing Foundation which supports the education of kids in disadvantaged communities.

== Publications ==
In 2008 Harris published his children's book, Yes, I can! The Story of the Jamaican Bobsled Team, illustrated by Ricardo Cortes. In 2010 he published his semi-autobiographical motivational book; Keep On Pushing: Hot Lessons from Cool Runnings
