= Wayne Thomas (bobsleigh) =

Jamaican bobsledder

Personal information
- Born: 10 October 1966 (age 58); Mandeville, Jamaica

Sport
- Sport: Bobsleigh

Wayne Thomas (born 10 October 1966) is a Jamaican bobsledder. He competed in the two man and the four man events at the 1994 Winter Olympics. He later became the coach of the national team.
