= Jamaica national bobsleigh team =

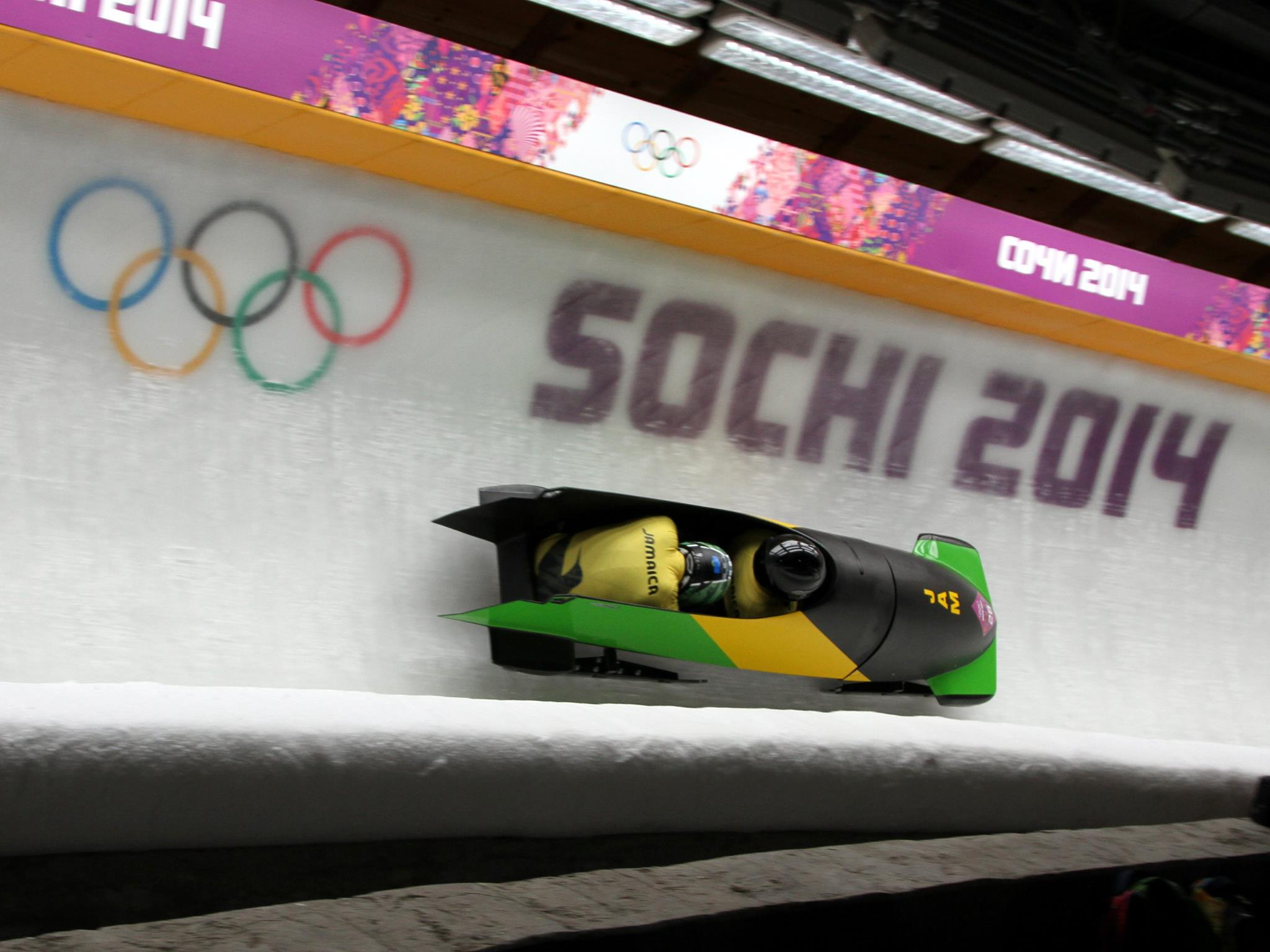
Jamaica's two-man bobsleigh at the 2014 Winter Olympics

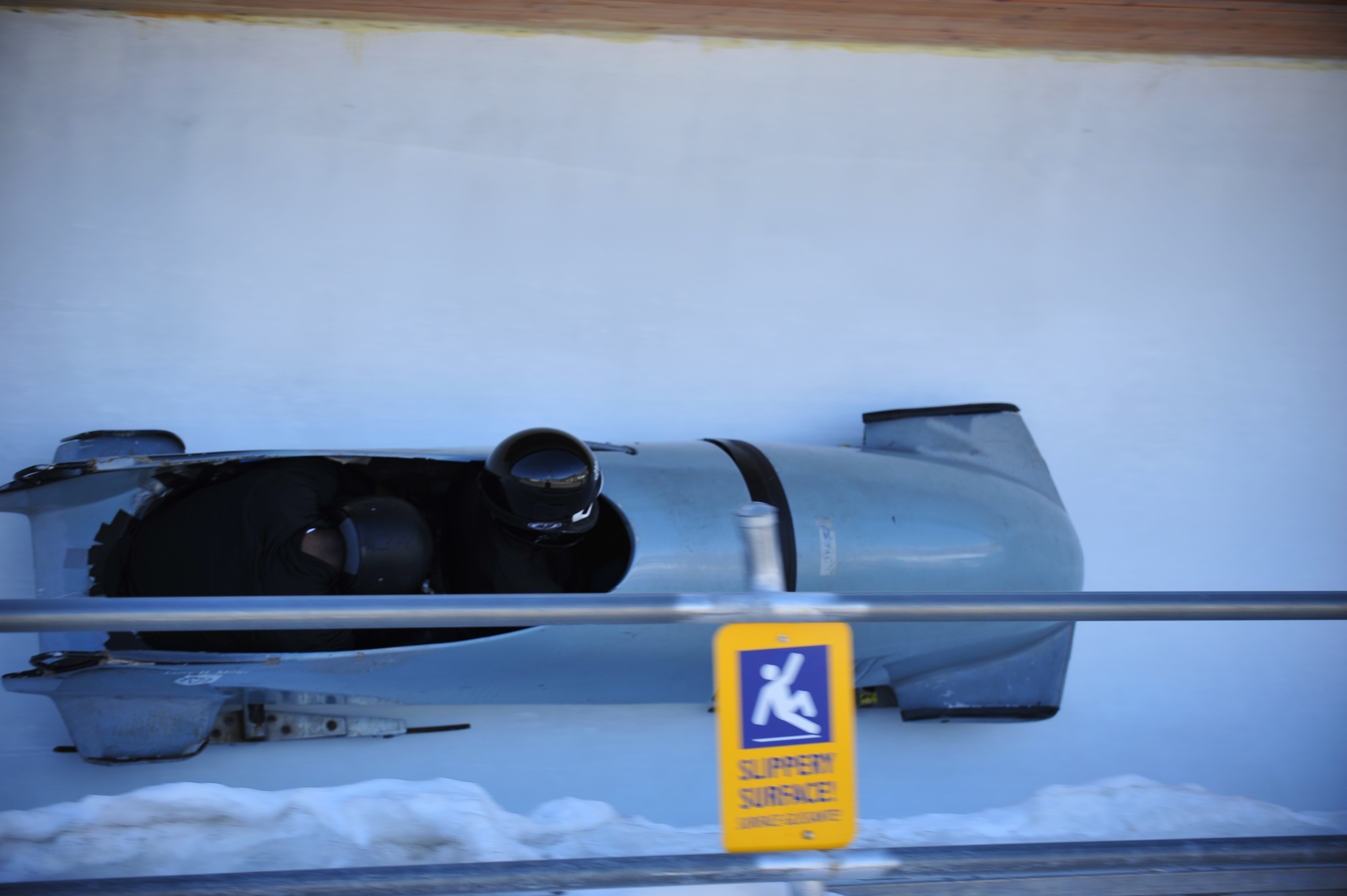
A Jamaican bobsleigh in 2009

The Jamaica national bobsleigh team represents Jamaica in international bobsleighing competitions. The men's team debut in the 1988 Winter Olympic Games four-man bobsleigh in Calgary was received as underdogs in a cold weather sport represented by a nation with a tropical environment. Jamaica returned to the Winter Olympics in the two-man bobsleigh in 1992, 1994, 1998, 2002, 2014, 2022, and 2026; a women's team debuted in 2018.

== Beginnings ==
The debut team, consisting of Devon Harris, Dudley Stokes, Michael White, Freddy Powell, and last minute replacement Chris Stokes, qualified at the 1988 Winter Olympic Games in Calgary, Alberta. Their coach was Howard Siler, an Olympic bobsledder for the United States in 1972 and 1980. As an unlikely competitor in a cold weather sport represented by a nation with a tropical environment, their "underdog" status quickly gained them popularity at the Games. They had little experience in the sport and had to appeal to other teams for basic equipment to compete. Sporting camaraderie across national boundaries followed. In the third out of four runs, they lost control of the sleigh, crashed, and did not officially finish. Dudley Stokes and Michael White entered the two-man bobsleigh event, finishing 30th out of 41 teams.

== Evolution ==
The team returned to the Olympics at the 1992 Winter Olympic Games in Albertville, France, and finished 25th. They qualified for the 1994 Winter Olympic Games in Lillehammer, Norway. Critics were stunned when they finished in 14th place, ahead of the United States, Russia, Australia, and France.

At the 2000 World Push in Monaco, the team won the gold medal.

At the 2002 Winter Olympic Games in Salt Lake City, the 2-man team of Winston Watts (pilot) and Lascelles Brown (brakeman) set the Park City bobsled track record and the Olympic record for the push-start segment of the 2-man race at 4.78 seconds. Jamaica failed to qualify for the 2006 Winter Olympic Games in Turin, Italy, and the 2010 Winter Olympic Games in Vancouver, Canada. The two-man bobsled team qualified for the 2014 Winter Olympic Games in Sochi, Russia.

== Jamaica National Women's Bobsleigh team ==
Jamaica competed in women's bobsleigh, with a crew of two coached by Norwegian Trond Knaplund, consisting of pilot Porscha Morgan and Wynsome Cole on brakes, winning World Push titles in 2000 and 2001. They achieved the fastest push times in all runs, resulting in a landslide victory. These women initiated the Jamaican women bobsleigh team/program and were seen as contenders in the sport. The programme suffered a setback because of lack of funding, and brakeman Wynsome Cole suffered injuries due to a crash, resulting in the team having to withdraw from a few of the competitions.

The team returned to competition at the 2014 Winter Olympic Games, with KayMarie Jones and Salcia Slack competing in a North American Cup race in November 2014, ending an over 10 year absence of a Jamaican female crew in international competition. One of the athletes on the revived team was NaTalia Stokes, daughter and niece of former Jamaican bobsledders Chris and Dudley Stokes.

== Modern day ==
Jamaica qualified for the 2014 Winter Olympic Games, but lacked funding; however, within two days, the cryptocurrency Dogecoin community raised on the team's behalf $30,000 of the approximately $40,000. An online campaign was set up, seeking to raise an additional $80,000 through the crowdfunding platform Tilt. The campaign closed on 22 January 2014; it surpassed the target goal, having collected $129,687.

Following the 2014 Winter Olympic Games, Todd Hays, former Olympic medalist and former coach of the Dutch and United States bobsleigh teams, was appointed head coach and technical director of the Jamaican team. However, he had to leave his role after one season due to a lack of funds to pay his salary, although he continued to work with the team in an unofficial capacity. Ahead of the 2018 Winter Olympic Games in Pyeongchang, South Korea, the Jamaican Bobsleigh Federation invested significantly in the team, buying a new sled for the women's crew of Jazmine Fenlator-Victorian and Carrie Russell, and filling a number of coaching positions, with former British, Dutch and Brazilian coach Jo Manning becoming High-Performance Director, former Olympic and World Champion Sandra Kiriasis joining as driving coach and Dudley Stokes being appointed as coach responsible for performance, mental preparation and general logistics. In January 2018, the Jamaica women's team qualified for the 2018 Winter Olympic Games. However the men's team missed out on Olympic qualification by one position in the world rankings. Days ahead of the start of bobsleigh training at the Games, Kiriasis parted ways with the Jamaica Bobsleigh Federation after she was told she would be demoted from her position as driver coach to the role of track and performance analyst. On 21 February, Fenlator-Victorian and Russell finished 19th in the two-woman Olympic bobsleigh event. At the 2026 Winter Olympic Games in Milan and Cortina d'Ampezzo in Italy, the Jamaican team consisted of a four-man team, a two man team, and a women's monobob. The two-man team, consisting of Junior Harris and Shane Pitter, came in 22nd out of 25 teams. Mica Moore came 14th out of 25 in the women's monobob event.

=== Current ===
2026 Winter Olympic team:

Position	Teammate
Pilot	Shane Pitter
Brakeman	Tyquendo Tracey
Brakeman	Joel Fearon
Brakeman	Junior Harris
Pilot/Brakewoman	Mica Moore

== Olympics record ==
=== Monobob ===
Olympics	Athletes	Ranking
2022	Jazmine Fenlator-Victorian	19
2026	Mica Moore	14

=== Two-man ===
Olympics	Athletes	Ranking
1988	Dudley Stokes; Michael White	30
1992	Devon Harris; Ricky McIntosh	35
1992	Dudley Stokes; Chris Stokes	36
1994	Dudley Stokes; Wayne Thomas	DQ
1998	Devon Harris; Michael Morgan	29
2002	Winston Watts; Lascelles Brown	28
2014	Winston Watts; Marvin Dixon	27
2022	Shanwayne Stephens; Nimroy Turgott	30
2026	Junior Harris Shane Pitter	22

=== Two-woman ===
Olympics	Athletes	Ranking
2018	Jazmine Fenlator-Victorian; Carrie Russell	19

=== Four-man ===
Olympics	Athletes	Ranking	Result
1988	Dudley Stokes; Devon Harris; Michael White; Chris Stokes	DNF	
1992	Dudley Stokes; Ricky McIntosh; Michael White; Chris Stokes	25	
1994	Dudley Stokes; Winston Watts; Chris Stokes; Wayne Thomas	14	
1998	Dudley Stokes; Winston Watts; Chris Stokes; Wayne Thomas	21	2:43.76
2022	Shanwayne Stephens; Rolando Reid; Ashley Watson; Matthew Wekpe	28	3:03:42
2026	Shane Pitter; Junior Harris; Tyquendo Tracey; Joel Fearon	21	2:46:02

== In popular culture ==
The 1988 team inspired the reggae parody song "Jamaican Bobsled" by The Rock 'n' Roll Animals, played on the GTR radio station and later released on the CD Yatta, Yatta, Yatta. The song was recorded after Jamaica had announced that they would be entering a bobsledding team into the Olympics, but before the Olympics had actually started; nevertheless, the lyrics accurately predict that the team would crash during one of their runs.

In 1993, Disney released Cool Runnings, a film loosely based on and inspired by the team's experience in the four-man Bobsleigh at the 1988 Winter Olympics event. A video game based on Jamaica's bobsleigh teams was released for the Wii on 12 October 2010. Titled Sled Shred featuring the Jamaican Bobsled Team and published by SouthPeak Games, it features characters steered by tilting the Wii Remote sliding down icy paths in varied scenery atop various sleds. The 2014 team was the inspiration for "The Bobsled Song" written by Sidney Mills from Steel Pulse, Jon Notar, and Groove Guild. The music video features 8-bit graphics. The song is timed to sync up to the team's Sochi bobsled run. The song was widely shown on television Olympics coverage in the lead-up to the team's run.

== See also ==
- Tropical nations at the Winter Olympics
- Nigerian bobsled team
