= Dudley Stokes =

Jamaican bobsledder

Personal information
- Born: 22 June 1962 (age 64)
- Height: 183 cm (6 ft 0 in)
- Weight: 89 kg (196 lb)

Sport
- Sport: Bobsleigh
- Events: 2-man bob, 4-man bob

Dudley Clifford "Tal" Stokes (born 22 June 1962) is a Jamaican bobsledder and bobsled coach. He competed at the 1988, 1992, 1994 and the 1998 Winter Olympics.

The 1993 Disney film Cool Runnings was a fictionalized account of the 1988 Jamaican bobsled team, the first time a Jamaican bobsled team competed in the Olympics.

== Biography ==
Together with his pusher, Michael White, Stokes competed in the Olympic two-man bobsleigh in Calgary in 1988 and finished 30th out of 41st. Thus, they were the first two Jamaicans in history to compete in the Winter Olympics.

As original four-man teammate Caswell Allen was injured during training shortly before the competition, he was replaced on the four-man bobsleigh team by Dudley Stokes' brother Chris Stokes. Chris was a very good sprinter but had never been in a bobsleigh before. The team finished 24th out of 26 after the first heat. However, after a fall in the last of the four runs, the race was over for the four, who had won many sympathies.

At the 1992 Winter Olympics, two Jamaican teams competed in the two-man bobsleigh race for the first time: this time, Stokes started in the two-man bobsleigh with his brother and finished 36th behind the "Jamaica 2" bobsleigh of Devon Harris and Richard McIntosh. In the four-man bobsleigh race, the team finished 25th out of 31.

Two years later, at the Winter Games in Lillehammer 1994, he competed with Wayne Thomas in the two-man bobsleigh race but was disqualified due to a crash. In the four-man bobsleigh race, however, things went better. Together with his brother, Wayne Thomas and Winston Watts, the crew finished 14th out of 30 participating bobsleigh teams.

His last Olympic appearance came four years later at the 1998 Nagano Games: this time, Stokes only competed in the four-man bobsleigh race and finished 21st.

After his career ended, Stokes was president of the Jamaican Bobsleigh Federation for four years.

Olympic Games
| Preceded by Bert Cameron | Flag bearer for Jamaica; Calgary 1988 | Succeeded by Merlene Ottey |
| Preceded by Merlene Ottey | Flag bearer for Jamaica; Albertville 1992 | Succeeded by Merlene Ottey |
