= Chris Stokes (bobsledder) =

Jamaican bobsledder

Personal information
- Full name: Nelson Christian Stokes
- Born: 2 November 1963 (age 62) Saint Andrew Parish, Jamaica
- Height: 1.89 m (6 ft 2 1/2 in)
- Weight: 90 kg (200 lb)

Sport
- Country: Jamaica
- Sport: Bobsleigh
- Team: Jamaican Bobsleigh

Achievements and titles
- Highest world ranking: 14th (1994)

Nelson Christian "Chris" Stokes (born 2 November 1963) is a Jamaican bobsledder. He has been an active member of the Jamaican Bobsleigh Team since its inception in 1988.

Stokes was a successful track and field athlete, and after his associate degree from Bronx Community College, he was awarded an athletic scholarship to the University of Idaho in Moscow, Idaho. After finishing a bachelor's degree in finance (cum laude) at the U of I, he went on to earn an MBA from nearby Washington State University in Pullman and a masters in Banking (with honors) from Georgetown University in Washington, D.C.

While in graduate school at WSU, he tried out for the 1988 Summer Olympics in Seoul and ended up in the Winter Olympics at Calgary.

His day job is as Vice President of Business Development at the Victoria Mutual Building Society. Stokes married Kayon Elizabeth Smith on 18 March 2006.

== Olympics ==
Along with his brother Dudley Stokes, Chris competed in four separate winter Olympics.

- 1988 – Competed in the Four-man event
- 1992 – 36th place in the Two-man event
- 1992 – 25th place in the Four-man event
- 1994 – 14th place in the Four-man event
- 1998 – 21st place in the Four-man event

In addition to his Olympic competition, Chris Stokes has been president of the Jamaica Bobsleigh Federation since 1995. He wrote Cool Runnings and Beyond – The Story of the Jamaica Bobsleigh Team (ISBN 1-58982-082-7) about his team's Olympic competition.

Olympic Games
Preceded by Merlene Ottey	Flag bearer for Jamaica; Lillehammer 1994	Succeeded by Juliet Cuthbert
