= Jamaica Olympic Association =

National Olympic Committee for Jamaica

- Country: Jamaica
- [[|]]
- Code: JAM
- Created: 1936
- Recognized: 1936
- Continental Association: PASO
- Headquarters: Kingston, Jamaica
- President: Christopher Samuda
- Secretary General: Ryan Foster
- Website: www.joa.org.jm

The Jamaica Olympic Association (IOC code: JAM) is the National Olympic Committee representing Jamaica. It is also the body responsible for Jamaica's representation at the Olympic Games.

== History ==
The Jamaica Olympic Association was founded in 1936 and recognised by the International Olympic Committee in the same year.

== Member federations ==
The Jamaican National Federations are the organizations that coordinate all aspects of their individual sports. They are responsible for training, competition and development of their sports. There are currently 18 Olympic Summer and 2 Winter Sport Federations and 4 Non-Olympic Sport Federations in Jamaica. Note that the Jamaican Olympic Ice Hockey Federation is the only non-profit organization based outside of Jamaica.

=== Olympic Sport federations ===
National Federation	Summer or Winter	Headquarters
Aquatic Sports Association of Jamaica	Summer	Kingston
Jamaica Athletics Administrative Association	Summer	Kingston
Jamaica Badminton Association	Summer	Kingston
Jamaica Basketball Association	Summer	Kingston
Jamaica Bobsleigh and Skeleton Federation	Winter	Kingston
Jamaica Boxing Association	Summer	Kingston
Jamaica Cycling Federation	Summer	Kingston
Jamaica Fencing Federation	Summer	Kingston
Jamaica Football Federation	Summer	Kingston
Jamaica Golf Association	Summer	Kingston
Jamaica Gymnastics Association	Summer	Kingston
Jamaica Hockey Federation	Summer	Kingston
Jamaica Judo Association	Summer	Portmore
Jamaican Olympic Ice Hockey Federation	Winter	Englewood, CO, USA
Jamaica Rifle Association	Summer	Kingston
Jamaica Rugby Football Union	Summer	Kingston
Jamaica Table Tennis Association	Summer	Kingston
Jamaica Taekwondo Association	Summer	Kingston
Jamaica Tennis Association	Summer	Kingston
Jamaica Triathlon Association	Summer	Kingston
Jamaica Volleyball Association	Summer	Kingston
Jamaica Weight Lifting Federation	Summer	Kingston
Jamaica Wrestling Federation	Summer	Kingston

=== Non-Olympic Sport federations ===
National Federation	Headquarters
Jamaica Cricket Association	Kingston
Jamaica Netball Association	Kingston
Jamaica Rugby League Association	Kingston
Jamaica Squash Association	Kingston

== See also ==
- Jamaica at the Olympics
- Jamaica at the Commonwealth Games
- Jamaica at the Pan American Games
- Jamaica at the Central American and Caribbean Games
- Jamaica at the Junior Pan American Games
