= 2023 IBA World Boxing Championships – Super heavyweight =

Super heavyweight at the 2023 IBA World Boxing Championships
- Venue: Humo Arena
- Location: Tashkent, Uzbekistan
- Dates: 1–14 May
- Competitors: 36 from 36 nations

Medalists
gold medal	Bakhodir Jalolov	Uzbekistan
silver medal	Fernando Arzola	Cuba
bronze medal	Mahammad Abdullayev	Azerbaijan
bronze medal	Ayoub Ghadfa	Spain

The Super heavyweight competition at the 2023 IBA Men's World Boxing Championships was held between 1 and 14 May 2023.

== Results ==
=== Finals ===
Semifinals
(Cuba) Fernando Arzola	4
(Azerbaijan) Mahammad Abdullayev	1
(Uzbekistan) Bakhodir Jalolov	w/o
(Spain) Ayoub Ghadfa

Final
(Cuba) Fernando Arzola
(Uzbekistan) Bakhodir Jalolov	ABD

=== Top half ===
==== Section 1 ====
Round of 64
(Croatia) Luka Pratljačić	1
(China) Bayikewuzi Danabieke	4

Round of 32
(Armenia) Davit Chaloyan	0
(China) Bayikewuzi Danabieke	5
(Egypt) Yousry Hafez	4
(Moldova) Alexei Zavatin	1
(Cuba) Fernando Arzola	5
(Italy) Diego Lenzi	0
(Tajikistan) Muhammad Abroridinov	1
(India) Narender Berwal	4

Round of 16
(China) Bayikewuzi Danabieke	4
(Egypt) Yousry Hafez	3
(Cuba) Fernando Arzola	5
(India) Narender Berwal	0

Quarterfinals
(China) Bayikewuzi Danabieke	0
(Cuba) Fernando Arzola	5

==== Section 2 ====
Round of 64
(South Korea) Ju Tae-ung	0
(Mexico) Javier Cruz	5

Round of 32
(Brazil) Abner Teixeira	5
(Serbia) Vladan Babić	0
(Georgia (country)) Nikoloz Begadze	4
(Bulgaria) Yordan Hernández	1
(Tanzania) Alex Sulwa
(Algeria) Mourad Kadi	RSC
(Mexico) Javier Cruz	0
(Azerbaijan) Mahammad Abdullayev	5

Round of 16
(Brazil) Abner Teixeira	1
(Georgia (country)) Nikoloz Begadze	4
(Algeria) Mourad Kadi	1
(Azerbaijan) Mahammad Abdullayev	4

Quarterfinals
(Georgia (country)) Nikoloz Begadze	0
(Azerbaijan) Mahammad Abdullayev	5

=== Bottom half ===
==== Section 3 ====
Round of 64
(Turkmenistan) Baky Toýçyýew
(Bahrain) Danis Latypov	RSC-I

Round of 32
(Uzbekistan) Bakhodir Jalolov	5
(Bahrain) Danis Latypov	0
(France) Djamili-Dini Aboudou	0
(Australia) Teremoana Junior	5
(Syria) Mohammad Mlaiyes	w/o
(Democratic Republic of the Congo) Maroy Sadiki
(Russia) Aleksei Dronov	1
(Kazakhstan) Kamshybek Kunkabayev	4

Round of 16
(Uzbekistan) Bakhodir Jalolov	RSC
(Australia) Teremoana Junior
(Syria) Mohammad Mlaiyes	0
(Kazakhstan) Kamshybek Kunkabayev	5

Quarterfinals
(Uzbekistan) Bakhodir Jalolov	5
(Kazakhstan) Kamshybek Kunkabayev	0

==== Section 4 ====
Round of 64
(Tonga) John Lavulo
(Colombia) Cristian Salcedo	KO

Round of 32
(Spain) Ayoub Ghadfa	5
(Nigeria) Ifeanyi Onyekwere	0
(Albania) Nelson Hysa	0
(Ecuador) Gerlon Congo	5
(Trinidad and Tobago) Nigel Paul	RSC
(Kyrgyzstan) Oomatbek Elchoro Uulu
(Colombia) Cristian Salcedo	0
(Austria) Ahmed Hagag	4

Round of 16
(Spain) Ayoub Ghadfa	5
(Ecuador) Gerlon Congo	2
(Trinidad and Tobago) Nigel Paul	0
(Austria) Ahmed Hagag	5

Quarterfinals
(Spain) Ayoub Ghadfa	3
(Austria) Ahmed Hagag	0
