= Boxing at the 2024 Summer Olympics – Men's +92 kg =

Men's +92 kg at the Games of the XXXIII Olympiad
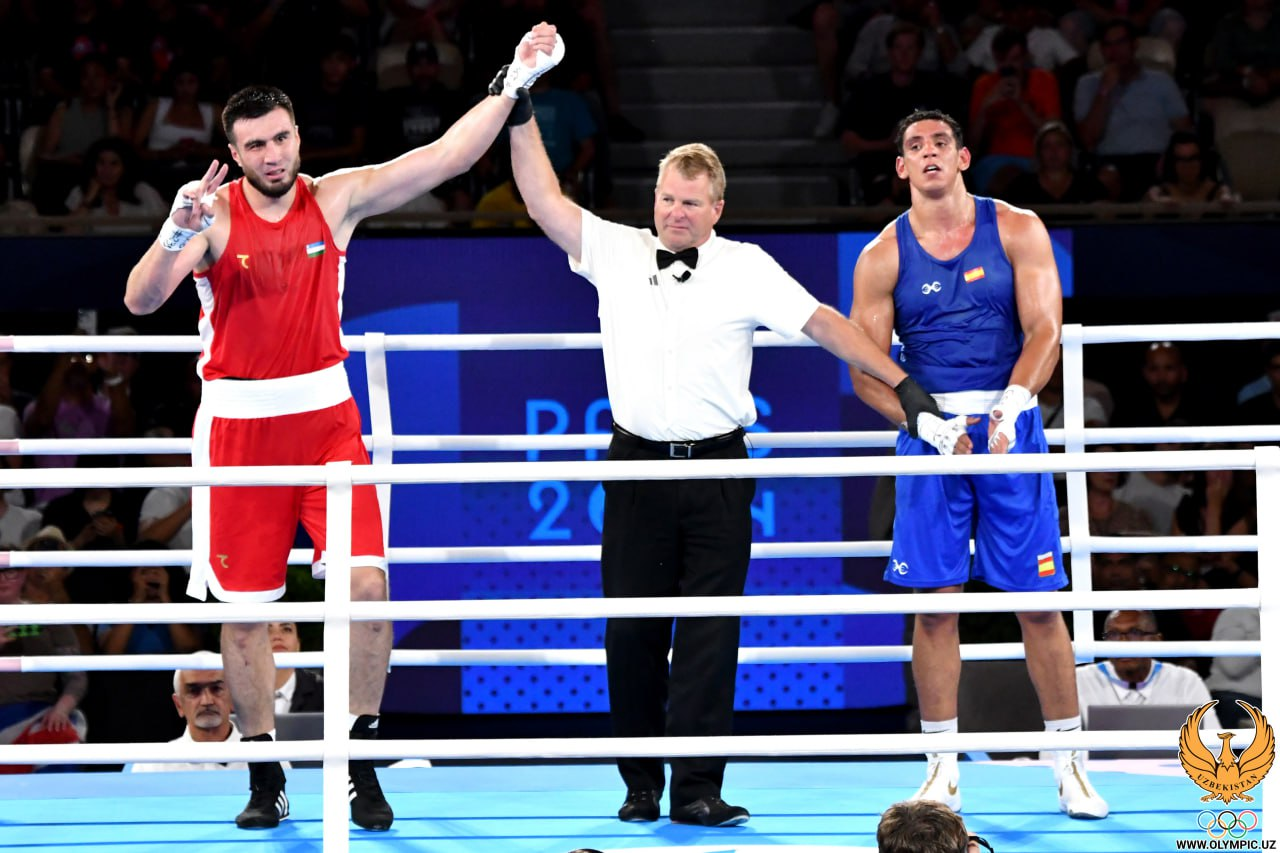
- Referee Wade Peterson raises Jalolov's hand after the judges declare him the winner in the gold medal bout
- Venue: Arena Paris Nord (preliminary); Stade Roland Garros (semifinals and finals)
- Dates: 29 July – 10 August 2024
- Competitors: 16 from 16 nations

Medalists
1st place, gold medalist(s)		Bakhodir Jalolov	Uzbekistan
2nd place, silver medalist(s)		Ayoub Ghadfa	Spain
3rd place, bronze medalist(s)		Nelvie Tiafack	Germany
3rd place, bronze medalist(s)		Djamili-Dini Aboudou Moindze	France

The men's +92 kg (super heavyweight) boxing event at the 2024 Summer Olympics took place between 29 July and 10 August 2024. Preliminary boxing matches occurred at Arena Paris Nord in Villepinte, with the medal rounds (semifinals and finals) staged at Stade Roland Garros.

== Background ==
This was the 11th appearance of the men's super heavyweight event. The event was first held in 1984, taking the place of heavyweight as the unlimited weight class (with heavyweight limited to 91 kg at that point), and has been held at every Summer Olympics since. The super heavyweight continued to allow boxers above the 91 kg limit of heavyweight.

The 2020 champion Bakhodir Jalolov defended his title. The 2020 silver medalist, Richard Torrez, turned professional and did not participate. One of the 2020 bronze medalists, Frazer Clarke, also turned professional, whereas another bronze medalis, Kamshybek Kunkabayev, lost to the eventual silver medalist Ayoub Ghadfa.

== Qualification ==
Each NOC could send one boxer to the event.

== Competition format ==
Like all Olympic boxing events, the competition was a straight single-elimination tournament. The competition began with a preliminary round, where the number of competitors was reduced to 16, and concluded with a final. As there were fewer than 32 boxers in the competition, a number of boxers received a bye through the preliminary round. Both semi-final losers were awarded bronze medals.

Bouts consisted of three three-minute rounds with a one-minute break between rounds. A boxer may win by knockout or by points. Scoring was on the "10-point-must," with five judges scoring each round. Judges consider "number of blows landed on the target areas, domination of the bout, technique and tactical superiority and competitiveness." Each judge determined a winner for each round, who received 10 points for the round, and assigned the round's loser a number of points between seven and nine based on performance. The judge's scores for each round were added to give a total score for that judge. The boxer with the higher score from a majority of the judges was the winner.

== Schedule ==
The schedule was as follows.

Legend

R16	Round of 16	QF	Quarter-Finals	SF	Semi-Finals	F	Final

Jul 29	Jul 30	Jul 31	Aug 1	Aug 2	Aug 3	Aug 4	Aug 5	Aug 6	Aug 7	Aug 8	Aug 9	Aug 10
R16				QF					SF			F

== Draw ==
The draw was held on 25 July 2024.

== Seeds ==
The seeds were released on 25 July 2024.

1. Joshua Edwards (USA) (round of 16)
2. Delicious Orie (GBR) (round of 16)
3. Mourad Kadi (ALG) (round of 16)
4. Bakhodir Jalolov (UZB) (champion)
5. Teremoana Junior (AUS) (quarterfinals)
6. Abner Teixeira (BRA) (round of 16)
7. Kamshybek Kunkabayev (KAZ) (round of 16)
8. Mahammad Abdullayev (AZE) (round of 16)

== Results ==
Round of 16
29 July
Joshua Edwards (USA)	1
Diego Lenzi (ITA)	3
29 July
Nelvie Tiafack (GER)	5
Mahammad Abdullayev (AZE)	0
29 July
Teremoana Junior (AUS)	KO
Dmytro Lovchynskyi (UKR)
29 July
Omar Shiha (NOR)	0
Bakhodir Jalolov (UZB)	5
29 July
Mourad Kadi (ALG)	1
Djamili-Dini Aboudou Moindze (FRA)	4
29 July
Gerlon Congo (ECU)	3
Abner Teixeira (BRA)	2
29 July
Kamshybek Kunkabayev (KAZ)	2
Ayoub Ghadfa (ESP)	3
29 July
Davit Chaloyan (ARM)	3
Delicious Orie (GBR)	2

Quarterfinals
2 August
Diego Lenzi (ITA)	0
Nelvie Tiafack (GER)	5
2 August
Teremoana Junior (AUS)	0
Bakhodir Jalolov (UZB)	5
2 August
Djamili-Dini Aboudou Moindze (FRA)	4
Gerlon Congo (ECU)	1
2 August
Ayoub Ghadfa (ESP)	5
Davit Chaloyan (ARM)	0

Semifinals
7 August
Nelvie Tiafack (GER)	0
Bakhodir Jalolov (UZB)	5
7 August
Djamili-Dini Aboudou Moindze (FRA)	0
Ayoub Ghadfa (ESP)	5

Final
10 August
Bakhodir Jalolov (UZB)	5
Ayoub Ghadfa (ESP)	0
