= 2021 AIBA World Boxing Championships – Super heavyweight =

Super heavyweight at the 2021 AIBA World Boxing Championships
- Venue: Štark Arena
- Location: Belgrade, Serbia
- Dates: 26 October – 5 November
- Competitors: 33 from 33 nations

Medalists
gold medal	Mark Petrovskii
silver medal	Davit Chaloyan	Armenia
bronze medal	Mahammad Abdullayev	Azerbaijan
bronze medal	Nigel Paul	Trinidad and Tobago

The Super heavyweight competition at the 2021 AIBA World Boxing Championships was held between 26 October and 5 November.

== Results ==
=== Finals ===
Semifinals
(Azerbaijan) Mahammad Abdullayev	0
(Armenia) Davit Chaloyan	5
Mark Petrovskii	4
(Trinidad and Tobago) Nigel Paul	1

Final
(Armenia) Davit Chaloyan	1
Mark Petrovskii	4

=== Top half ===
==== Section 1 ====
First round
(India) Narender Berwal	4
(Poland) Oskar Safaryan	1

Second round
(Sierra Leone) Mohamed Kendeh
(India) Narender Berwal	RSC
(Tajikistan) Jahon Qurbonov	4
(Kenya) Elly Ochola	1
(Azerbaijan) Mahammad Abdullayev	5
(Lithuania) Jonas Jazevičius	0
(Serbia) Vladan Babić	3
(Cameroon) Maxime Yegnong	2

Third round
(India) Narender Berwal	RSC
(Tajikistan) Jahon Qurbonov
(Azerbaijan) Mahammad Abdullayev	5
(Serbia) Vladan Babić	0

Quarterfinals
(India) Narender Berwal	0
(Azerbaijan) Mahammad Abdullayev	5

==== Section 2 ====
Second round
(Hungary) Koppány Fehér	0
(Colombia) Cristian Salcedo	5
(Ukraine) Tsotne Rogava	1
(Armenia) Davit Chaloyan	4
(Mexico) Luis Gómez
(England) Delicious Orie	RSC
(Iran) Pouria Amiri	1
(Uzbekistan) Lazizbek Mullojonov	4

Third round
(Colombia) Cristian Salcedo	1
(Armenia) Davit Chaloyan	4
(England) Delicious Orie	0
(Uzbekistan) Lazizbek Mullojonov	5

Quarterfinals
(Armenia) Davit Chaloyan	3
(Uzbekistan) Lazizbek Mullojonov	2

=== Bottom half ===
==== Section 3 ====
Second round
(South Korea) Kim Do-hyeon	w/o
(Tanzania) Alex Sulwa
(Ecuador) Gerlon Congo	4
(Moldova) Alexei Zavatin	1
(Jamaica) Ricardo Brown	0
Mark Petrovskii	5
(Germany) Nelvie Tiafack	RSC
(Saint Lucia) Ryan Charles

Third round
(South Korea) Kim Do-hyeon	1
(Ecuador) Gerlon Congo	4
Mark Petrovskii	3
(Germany) Nelvie Tiafack	2

Quarterfinals
(Ecuador) Gerlon Congo	2
Mark Petrovskii	3

==== Section 4 ====
Second round
(Albania) Nelson Hysa	1
(Trinidad and Tobago) Nigel Paul	4
(Spain) Ayoub Ghadfa	4
(Kazakhstan) Nurlan Saparbay	1
(Croatia) Marko Milun	0
(Turkey) Berat Acar	5
(Bulgaria) Petar Belberov	KO
(Seychelles) Keddy Agnes

Third round
(Trinidad and Tobago) Nigel Paul	4
(Spain) Ayoub Ghadfa	1
(Turkey) Berat Acar	5
(Bulgaria) Petar Belberov	0

Quarterfinals
(Trinidad and Tobago) Nigel Paul	4
(Turkey) Berat Acar	1
