= Boxing at the 2023 European Games – Men's super heavyweight =

Men's super heavyweight boxing at the 2023 European Games
- Venue: Nowy Targ Arena
- Location: Nowy Targ, Poland
- Dates: 25 June – 2 July
- Competitors: 24 from 24 nations

Medalists
gold medal	Delicious Orie	Great Britain
silver medal	Mahammad Abdullayev	Azerbaijan
bronze medal	Yordan Hernández	Bulgaria
bronze medal	Nelvie Tiafack	Germany

The men's super heavyweight boxing event at the 2023 European Games was held between 25 June and 2 July 2023.

== Results ==
=== Finals ===
Semi-finals
Mahammad Abdullayev (AZE)	4
Nelvie Tiafack (GER)	1
Yordan Hernández (BUL)	0
Delicious Orie (GBR)	5

Final
Mahammad Abdullayev (AZE)	0
Delicious Orie (GBR)	5

=== Top half ===
==== Section 1 ====
Round of 32
László Felföldi (HUN)	1
Jure Šimunović (SLO)	4
Uğur Aydemir (TUR)
Mahammad Abdullayev (AZE)	RSC

Round of 16
Stylianos Roulias (GRE)	5
Jure Šimunović (SLO)	0
Mahammad Abdullayev (AZE)	3
Nikoloz Begadze (GEO)	1

Quarterfinals
Stylianos Roulias (GRE)	0
Mahammad Abdullayev (AZE)	5

==== Section 2 ====
Round of 32
Alexei Zavatin (MDA)	0
Ayoub Ghadfa (ESP)	5
Stan Bertens (NED)	0
Nelvie Tiafack (GER)	5

Round of 16
Dmytro Lovchynskyi (UKR)	0
Ayoub Ghadfa (ESP)	5
Nelvie Tiafack (GER)	4
Djamili-Dini Aboudou (FRA)	1

Quarterfinals
Ayoub Ghadfa (ESP)	2
Nelvie Tiafack (GER)	3

=== Bottom half ===
==== Section 3 ====
Round of 32
Juraj Soldo (BIH)	0
Diego Lenzi (ITA)	5
Radosław Kawczak (POL)	1
Jonas Jazevičius (LTU)	4

Round of 16
Yordan Hernández (BUL)	4
Diego Lenzi (ITA)	1
Jonas Jazevičius (LTU)	RSC
Shpejtim Shabani (KOS)

Quarterfinals
Yordan Hernández (BUL)	5
Jonas Jazevičius (LTU)	0

==== Section 4 ====
Round of 32
Marko Milun (CRO)	0
Delicious Orie (GBR)	4
Vladan Babić (SRB)	0
Davit Chaloyan (ARM)	5

Round of 16
Omar Mohamed Shiha (NOR)	0
Delicious Orie (GBR)	5
Davit Chaloyan (ARM)	5
Martin Pinc (CZE)	0

Quarterfinals
Delicious Orie (GBR)	5
Davit Chaloyan (ARM)	0
