= 2017 AIBA World Boxing Championships – Super heavyweight =

Boxing competitions

Super heavyweight at the 2017 AIBA World Boxing Championships
- Venue: Alsterdorfer Sporthalle
- Location: Hamburg, Germany
- Dates: 26 August–2 September
- Competitors: 22 from 22 nations

Medalists
| gold medal | Magomedrasul Majidov | Azerbaijan |
| silver medal | Kamshybek Kunkabayev | Kazakhstan |
| bronze medal | Arsène Fokou Fosso | Cameroon |
| bronze medal | Joseph Goodall | Australia |

The Super heavyweight competition at the 2017 AIBA World Boxing Championships was held from 26 August to 2 September 2017.

== Draw ==
=== Final ===
| Final |
| 2 September |
| (Kazakhstan) Kamshybek Kunkabayev | 1 |
| (Azerbaijan) Magomedrasul Majidov | 4 |

=== Top half ===
First round
26 August
(Denmark) Kem Larsen | w/o
(Angola) Carlos Masia
26 August
(Argentina) Luis Calderón | 0
(Moldova) Alexei Zavatin | 5
26 August
(Republic of Ireland) Dean Gardiner | 5
(South Korea) Kim Do-hyeon | 0

Second round
28 August
(Uzbekistan) Bakhodir Jalolov | KO
(Denmark) Kem Larsen
28 August
(Kazakhstan) Kamshybek Kunkabayev | 5
(Germany) Max Keller | 0
28 August
(Cameroon) Arsène Fokou Fosso | 3
(Moldova) Alexei Zavatin | 2
28 August
(Republic of Ireland) Dean Gardiner | 2
(Colombia) Cristian Salcedo | 3

Quarterfinals
29 August
(Uzbekistan) Bakhodir Jalolov | 2
(Kazakhstan) Kamshybek Kunkabayev | 3
29 August
(Cameroon) Arsène Fokou Fosso | TKO
(Colombia) Cristian Salcedo

Semifinals
1 September
(Kazakhstan) Kamshybek Kunkabayev | 5
(Cameroon) Arsène Fokou Fosso | 0

=== Bottom half ===
First round
26 August
(Egypt) Yousry Hafez | 0
(Australia) Joseph Goodall | 5
26 August
(Trinidad and Tobago) Nigel Paul | 0
(Italy) Guido Vianello | 5
26 August
(India) Satish Kumar | 0
(Azerbaijan) Magomedrasul Majidov | 5

Second round
28 August
(Ukraine) Victor Vykhryst | 2
(Australia) Joseph Goodall | 3
28 August
(Italy) Guido Vianello | 1
(Russia) Maxim Babanin | 4
28 August
(France) Djamili-Dini Aboudou | 5
(Nicaragua) Dirk Wells | 0
28 August
(Azerbaijan) Magomedrasul Majidov | 5
(Jordan) Hussein Ishaish | 0

Quarterfinals
29 August
(Australia) Joseph Goodall | 3
(Russia) Maxim Babanin | 0
29 August
(France) Djamili-Dini Aboudou | 2
(Azerbaijan) Magomedrasul Majidov | 3

Semifinals
1 September
(Australia) Joseph Goodall | 1
(Azerbaijan) Magomedrasul Majidov | 4
