= Bayikewuzi Danabieke =

Chinese boxer (born 1997)

Personal information
- Nationality: Chinese
- Born: 7 April 1997 (age 29) Emin County, Xinjiang, China
- Height: 199 cm (6 ft 6 in)
- Weight: Super heavyweight

Boxing career
- Stance: Orthodox
Medal record
Men's Amateur Boxing
Representing China
World Championships
Bronze medal – third place	2025 Liverpool	+90 kg
Asian Games
Bronze medal – third place	2022 Hangzhou	Super heavyweight

Bayikewuzi Danabieke (Kazakh: Байқоныс Данабек, Chinese: 巴依克吾孜·达那别克; pinyin: Bāyīkèwúzī·dánàbiékè; born 7 April 1997) is a Chinese boxer. He won a bronze medal in the +92 kg event of the 2022 Asian Games.

== Background ==
Bayikewuzi was born in 1997 in Emin County, Xinjiang, China. He is of Kazakh ethnicity.

== Career ==
In May 2023, Bayikewuzi participated in the Super heavyweight event of the 2023 IBA Men's World Boxing Championships. He defeated Luka Pratljačić, Davit Chaloyan and Yousry Hafez before losing to Fernando Arzola in the quarterfinals to come fifth place overall.

In October 2023, Bayikewuzi won a bronze medal in the +92 kg event of the 2022 Asian Games.
