= Kazakhstan at the Olympics =

- IOC code: KAZ
- NOC: National Olympic Committee of the Republic of Kazakhstan
- Website: www.olympic.kz (in Kazakh)
- Medals Ranked 49th: Gold 17 Silver 28 Bronze 42 Total 87

Summer appearances
- 1996; 2000; 2004; 2008; 2012; 2016; 2020; 2024; 2028

Winter appearances
- 1994; 1998; 2002; 2006; 2010; 2014; 2018; 2022; 2026

Other related appearances
- Russian Empire (1900–1912); Soviet Union (1952–1988); Unified Team (1992)

Kazakhstan first participated at the Olympic Games as an independent nation in 1994, and has sent athletes to compete in every Games since then. Prior to the dissolution of the Soviet Union, Kazakh athletes competed as part of the Soviet Union, and were also part of the Unified Team in 1992.

The National Olympic Committee of Kazakhstan was created in 1990 and recognized in 1993.

== Medal tables ==
=== Medals by Summer Games ===
Games	Athletes	Gold	Silver	Bronze	Total	Rank
1900–1912	as part of the Russian Empire					
1920–1948	did not participate					
1952–1988	as part of the Soviet Union					
(Spain) 1992 Barcelona	as part of the Unified Team					
(United States) 1996 Atlanta	96	3	4	4	11	24
(Australia) 2000 Sydney	130	3	4	0	7	22
(Greece) 2004 Athens	119	1	4	3	8	40
(China) 2008 Beijing	132	2	3	4	9	29
(United Kingdom) 2012 London	115	3	2	6	11	24
(Brazil) 2016 Rio de Janeiro	104	2	5	10	17	30
(Japan) 2020 Tokyo	93	0	0	8	8	83
(France) 2024 Paris	79	1	3	3	7	43
(United States) 2028 Los Angeles	future event					
(Australia) 2032 Brisbane	future event					
Total (8/30)	868	15	25	38	78	49

=== Medals by Winter Games ===
Games	Athletes	Gold	Silver	Bronze	Total	Rank
1956–1988	as part of the Soviet Union					
(France) 1992 Albertville	as part of the Unified Team					
(Norway) 1994 Lillehammer	29	1	2	0	3	12
(Japan) 1998 Nagano	60	0	0	2	2	20
(United States) 2002 Salt Lake City	50	0	0	0	0	–
(Italy) 2006 Turin	56	0	0	0	0	–
(Canada) 2010 Vancouver	37	0	1	0	1	25
(Russia) 2014 Sochi	52	0	0	1	1	26
(South Korea) 2018 Pyeongchang	46	0	0	1	1	28
(China) 2022 Beijing	34	0	0	0	0	–
(Italy) 2026 Milano Cortina	36	1	0	0	1	19
(France) 2030 French Alps	future event					
(United States) 2034 Utah	future event					
Total (9/25)	400	2	3	4	9	35

=== Medals by summer sport ===
Sport	Gold	Silver	Bronze	Total
Boxing	7	8	11	26
Athletics	2	1	2	5
Wrestling	1	6	11	18
Weightlifting	1	4	6	11
Judo	1	2	3	6
Cycling	1	1	0	2
Modern pentathlon	1	0	0	1
Swimming	1	0	0	1
Shooting	0	2	2	4
Gymnastics	0	1	0	1
Karate	0	0	2	2
Taekwondo	0	0	1	1
Totals (12 entries)	15	25	38	78

=== Medals by winter sport ===
Sport	Gold	Silver	Bronze	Total
Cross country skiing	1	2	1	4
Figure skating	1	0	1	2
Biathlon	0	1	0	1
Freestyle skiing	0	0	1	1
Speed skating	0	0	1	1
Totals (5 entries)	2	3	4	9

== List of medalists ==
=== Summer Olympics ===
Medal	Name	Games	Sport	Event
Gold	Vassiliy Jirov	1996 Atlanta	Boxing	Men's light-heavyweight
Gold	Alexander Parygin	1996 Atlanta	Modern pentathlon	Men's individual
Gold	Yuriy Melnichenko	1996 Atlanta	Wrestling	Men's Greco-Roman 57 kg
Silver	Bulat Zhumadilov	1996 Atlanta	Boxing	Men's flyweight
Silver	Sergey Belyayev	1996 Atlanta	Shooting	Men's 50 m rifle prone
Silver	Sergey Belyayev	1996 Atlanta	Shooting	Men's 50 m rifle three positions
Silver	Anatoly Khrapaty	1996 Atlanta	Weightlifting	Men's 99 kg
Bronze	Bulat Niyazymbetov	1996 Atlanta	Boxing	Men's light-welterweight
Bronze	Yermakhan Ibraimov	1996 Atlanta	Boxing	Men's light-middleweight
Bronze	Vladimir Vokhmyanin	1996 Atlanta	Shooting	Men's 25 m rapid fire pistol
Bronze	Maulen Mamyrov	1996 Atlanta	Wrestling	Men's freestyle 52 kg
Gold	Olga Shishigina	2000 Sydney	Athletics	Women's 100 m hurdles
Gold	Bekzat Sattarkhanov	2000 Sydney	Boxing	Men's featherweight
Gold	Yermakhan Ibraimov	2000 Sydney	Boxing	Men's light-middleweight
Silver	Bulat Zhumadilov	2000 Sydney	Boxing	Men's flyweight
Silver	Mukhtarkhan Dildabekov	2000 Sydney	Boxing	Men's super heavyweight
Silver	Alexander Vinokourov	2000 Sydney	Cycling	Men's road race
Silver	Islam Bairamukov	2000 Sydney	Wrestling	Men's freestyle 97 kg
Gold	Bakhtiyar Artayev	2004 Athens	Boxing	Men's welterweight
Silver	Gennady Golovkin	2004 Athens	Boxing	Men's middleweight
Silver	Sergey Filimonov	2004 Athens	Weightlifting	Men's 77 kg
Silver	Gennadiy Laliyev	2004 Athens	Wrestling	Men's freestyle 74 kg
Silver	Georgiy Tsurtsumia	2004 Athens	Wrestling	Men's Greco-Roman 120 kg
Bronze	Dmitriy Karpov	2004 Athens	Athletics	Men's decathlon
Bronze	Serik Yeleuov	2004 Athens	Boxing	Men's lightweight
Bronze	Mkhitar Manukyan	2004 Athens	Wrestling	Men's Greco-Roman 66 kg
Gold	Bakhyt Sarsekbayev	2008 Beijing	Boxing	Men's welterweight
Gold	Alla Vazhenina	2008 Beijing	Weightlifting	Women's 75 kg
Silver	Askhat Zhitkeyev	2008 Beijing	Judo	Men's 100 kg
Silver	Nurbakyt Tengizbayev	2008 Beijing	Wrestling	Men's Greco-Roman 60 kg
Silver	Olga Rypakova	2008 Beijing	Athletics	Women's triple jump
Bronze	Yerkebulan Shynaliyev	2008 Beijing	Boxing	Men's light heavyweight
Bronze	Arman Chilmanov	2008 Beijing	Taekwondo	Men's +80 kg
Bronze	Marid Mutalimov	2008 Beijing	Wrestling	Men's freestyle 120 kg
Bronze	Yelena Shalygina	2008 Beijing	Wrestling	Women's freestyle 63 kg
Gold	Olga Rypakova	2012 London	Athletics	Women's triple jump
Gold	Serik Sapiyev	2012 London	Boxing	Men's welterweight
Gold	Alexander Vinokourov	2012 London	Cycling	Men's road race
Silver	Adilbek Niyazymbetov	2012 London	Boxing	Men's light heavyweight
Silver	Anna Nurmukhambetova	2012 London	Weightlifting	Women's 69 kg
Bronze	Ivan Dychko	2012 London	Boxing	Men's super heavyweight
Bronze	Marina Volnova	2012 London	Boxing	Women's middleweight
Bronze	Akzhurek Tanatarov	2012 London	Wrestling	Men's freestyle 66 kg
Bronze	Daniyal Gadzhiyev	2012 London	Wrestling	Men's Greco-Roman 84 kg
Bronze	Guzel Manyurova	2012 London	Wrestling	Women's freestyle 72 kg
Bronze	Daulet Shabanbay	2012 London	Wrestling	Men's freestyle 120 kg
Gold	Daniyar Yeleussinov	2016 Rio de Janeiro	Boxing	Men's welterweight
Gold	Dmitriy Balandin	2016 Rio de Janeiro	Swimming	Men's 200 m breaststroke
Silver	Adilbek Niyazymbetov	2016 Rio de Janeiro	Boxing	Men's light heavyweight
Silver	Vasiliy Levit	2016 Rio de Janeiro	Boxing	Men's heavyweight
Silver	Yeldos Smetov	2016 Rio de Janeiro	Judo	Men's 60 kg
Silver	Zhazira Zhapparkul	2016 Rio de Janeiro	Weightlifting	Women's 69 kg
Silver	Guzel Manyurova	2016 Rio de Janeiro	Wrestling	Women's freestyle 75 kg
Bronze	Olga Rypakova	2016 Rio de Janeiro	Athletics	Women's triple jump
Bronze	Ivan Dychko	2016 Rio de Janeiro	Boxing	Men's super heavyweight
Bronze	Dariga Shakimova	2016 Rio de Janeiro	Boxing	Women's middleweight
Bronze	Galbadrakhyn Otgontsetseg	2016 Rio de Janeiro	Judo	Women's 48 kg
Bronze	Farkhad Kharki	2016 Rio de Janeiro	Weightlifting	Men's 62 kg
Bronze	Alexandr Zaichikov	2016 Rio de Janeiro	Weightlifting	Men's 105 kg
Bronze	Karina Goricheva	2016 Rio de Janeiro	Weightlifting	Women's 63 kg
Bronze	Yekaterina Larionova	2016 Rio de Janeiro	Wrestling	Women's freestyle 63 kg
Bronze	Elmira Syzdykova	2016 Rio de Janeiro	Wrestling	Women's freestyle 69 kg
Bronze	Denis Ulanov	2016 Rio de Janeiro	Weightlifting	Men's 85 kg
Bronze	Yeldos Smetov	2020 Tokyo	Judo	Men's 60 kg
Bronze	Igor Son	2020 Tokyo	Weightlifting	Men's 61 kg
Bronze	Zulfiya Chinshanlo	2020 Tokyo	Weightlifting	Women's 55 kg
Bronze	Kamshybek Kunkabayev	2020 Tokyo	Boxing	Men's super heavyweight
Bronze	Saken Bibossinov	2020 Tokyo	Boxing	Men's flyweight
Bronze	Nurislam Sanayev	2020 Tokyo	Wrestling	Men's freestyle 57 kg
Bronze	Darkhan Assadilov	2020 Tokyo	Karate	Men's kumite 67 kg
Bronze	Sofya Berultseva	2020 Tokyo	Karate	Women's kumite +61 kg
Gold	Yeldos Smetov	2024 Paris	Judo	Men‍–‍60 kg
Silver	Nariman Kurbanov	2024 Paris	Gymnastics	Men's pommel horse
Silver	Nurbek Oralbay	2024 Paris	Boxing	Men’s middleweight
Bronze	Alexandra Le; Islam Satpayev	2024 Paris	Shooting	Mixed 10 metre air rifle team

=== Winter Olympics ===
Medal	Name	Games	Sport	Event
Gold	Vladimir Smirnov	1994 Lillehammer	Cross-country skiing	Men's 50 km classical
Silver	Vladimir Smirnov	1994 Lillehammer	Cross-country skiing	Men's 10 km classical
Silver	Vladimir Smirnov	1994 Lillehammer	Cross-country skiing	Men's 15 km freestyle pursuit
Bronze	Vladimir Smirnov	1998 Nagano	Cross-country skiing	Men's 15 km freestyle pursuit
Bronze	Lyudmila Prokasheva	1998 Nagano	Speed skating	Women's 5000 m
Silver	Elena Khrustaleva	2010 Vancouver	Biathlon	Women's individual
Bronze	Denis Ten	2014 Sochi	Figure skating	Men's singles
Bronze	Yuliya Galysheva	2018 Pyeongchang	Freestyle skiing	Women's moguls
Gold	Mikhail Shaidorov	2026 Milano Cortina	Figure skating	Men's singles

== Upgraded Medalists ==
1. Nurbakyt Tengizbayev from bronze to silver (Wrestling at the 2008 Summer Olympics – Men's Greco-Roman 60 kg)
2. Alla Vazhenina from silver to gold (Weightlifting at the 2008 Summer Olympics – Women's 75 kg)
3. Olga Rypakova from 4th place to silver (Athletics at the 2008 Summer Olympics – Women's triple jump)
4. Anna Nurmukhambetova from 4th place to silver (Weightlifting at the 2012 Summer Olympics – Women's 69 kg)
5. Daulet Shabanbay from 5th place to bronze (Wrestling at the 2012 Summer Olympics – Men's freestyle 120 kg)
6. Denis Ulanov from 4th place to bronze (Weightlifting at the 2016 Summer Olympics – Men's 85 kg)

== Stripped Olympic medals ==
The athletes from Kazakhstan listed below tested positive for doping and were stripped of their medals.

#	Medal	Name	Sport	Event	Date
1	Gold	Ilya Ilyin	Weightlifting	Men's 94 kg	17 August 2008
2	Silver	Irina Nekrassova	Weightlifting	Women's 63 kg	12 August 2008
3	Silver	Taimuraz Tigiyev	Wrestling	Men's freestyle 96 kg	21 August 2008
4	Bronze	Asset Mambetov	Wrestling	Men's Greco-Roman 96 kg	14 August 2008
5	Bronze	Mariya Grabovetskaya	Weightlifting	Women's +75 kg	16 August 2008
6	Gold	Zulfiya Chinshanlo	Weightlifting	Women's 53 kg	29 July 2012
7	Gold	Maiya Maneza	Weightlifting	Women's 63 kg	31 July 2012
8	Gold	Svetlana Podobedova	Weightlifting	Women's 75 kg	3 August 2012
9	Gold	Ilya Ilyin	Weightlifting	Men's 94 kg	4 August 2012
10	Gold	Nijat Rahimov	Weightlifting	Men's 77 kg	10 August 2016

== See also ==
- List of flag bearers for Kazakhstan at the Olympics
- Category:Olympic competitors for Kazakhstan
- Kazakhstan at the Paralympics
- Russia at the Olympics
- Russia at the Paralympics
- List of Kazakhs
