= Boxing at the 2019 Pan American Games =

- boxing pictogram
- Venue: Miguel Grau Coliseum
- Dates: July 27 – August 2, 2019
- No. of events: 15 (10 men, 5 women)
- Competitors: 120 from 25 nations

Boxing competitions at the 2019 Pan American Games in Lima were held between July 27 and August 2, 2019 at the Miguel Grau Coliseum in the Villa Deportiva Regional del Callao cluster.

The competition was split among 15 events, 10 for men and five for women. In 2016, the International Olympic Committee (IOC) made several changes to its sports program, which were subsequently implemented for these games. Included in this was the addition of two additional women's boxing events.

== Medal table ==
* Host nation (Peru)

Rank	Nation	Gold	Silver	Bronze	Total
1	Cuba	8	1	1	10
2	United States	2	3	5	10
3	Brazil	1	3	2	6
4	Dominican Republic	1	2	3	6
5	Colombia	1	2	1	4
6	Argentina	1	1	1	3
7	Puerto Rico	1	0	1	2
8	Canada	0	2	0	2
9	Ecuador	0	1	1	2
10	Venezuela	0	0	4	4
11	Mexico	0	0	3	3
12	Nicaragua	0	0	2	2
12	Peru*	0	0	2	2
14	Antigua and Barbuda	0	0	1	1
14	Jamaica	0	0	1	1
14	Trinidad and Tobago	0	0	1	1
14	Uruguay	0	0	1	1
Totals (17 entries)		15	15	30	60

== Medallists ==
=== Men ===
Event	Gold	Silver	Bronze
49 kg	Óscar Collazo; Puerto Rico	Yuberjen Martínez; Colombia	Kevin Arias; Nicaragua
49 kg	Óscar Collazo; Puerto Rico	Yuberjen Martínez; Colombia	Damián Arce; Cuba
52 kg	Rodrigo Marte; Dominican Republic	Yosvany Veitía; Cuba	Yankiel Rivera; Puerto Rico
52 kg	Rodrigo Marte; Dominican Republic	Yosvany Veitía; Cuba	Ramón Quiroga; Argentina
56 kg	Osvel Caballero; Cuba	Duke Ragan; United States	Lucas Fernández; Uruguay
56 kg	Osvel Caballero; Cuba	Duke Ragan; United States	Alexy De La Cruz; Dominican Republic
60 kg	Lázaro Álvarez; Cuba	Leonel de los Santos; Dominican Republic	Leodan Pezo; Peru
60 kg	Lázaro Álvarez; Cuba	Leonel de los Santos; Dominican Republic	Luis Angel Cabrera; Venezuela
64 kg	Andy Cruz; Cuba	Keyshawn Davis; United States	Alston Ryan; Antigua and Barbuda
64 kg	Andy Cruz; Cuba	Keyshawn Davis; United States	Michael Alexander; Trinidad and Tobago
69 kg	Roniel Iglesias; Cuba	Rohan Polanco; Dominican Republic	Delante Johnson; United States
69 kg	Roniel Iglesias; Cuba	Rohan Polanco; Dominican Republic	Gabriel Maestre; Venezuela
75 kg	Arlen López; Cuba	Hebert Carvalho; Brazil	Lesther Espino; Nicaragua
75 kg	Arlen López; Cuba	Hebert Carvalho; Brazil	Troy Isley; United States
81 kg	Julio César La Cruz; Cuba	Keno Machado; Brazil	Nalek Korbaj; Venezuela
81 kg	Julio César La Cruz; Cuba	Keno Machado; Brazil	Rogelio Romero; Mexico
91 kg	Erislandy Savón; Cuba	Julio Castillo; Ecuador	Abner Teixeira; Brazil
91 kg	Erislandy Savón; Cuba	Julio Castillo; Ecuador	José María Lúcar; Peru
+91 kg	Dainier Peró; Cuba	Cristian Salcedo; Colombia	Ricardo Brown; Jamaica
+91 kg	Dainier Peró; Cuba	Cristian Salcedo; Colombia	Richard Torrez; United States

=== Women ===
Event	Gold	Silver	Bronze
51 kg	Ingrit Valencia; Colombia	Virginia Fuchs; United States	Irismar Cardozo; Venezuela
51 kg	Ingrit Valencia; Colombia	Virginia Fuchs; United States	Miguelina Hernández; Dominican Republic
57 kg	Leonela Sánchez; Argentina	Jucielen Romeu; Brazil	Yeni Arias; Colombia
57 kg	Leonela Sánchez; Argentina	Jucielen Romeu; Brazil	Yarisel Ramirez; United States
60 kg	Beatriz Ferreira; Brazil	Dayana Sánchez; Argentina	Rashida Ellis; United States
60 kg	Beatriz Ferreira; Brazil	Dayana Sánchez; Argentina	Esmeralda Falcón; Mexico
69 kg	Oshae Jones; United States	Myriam Da Silva; Canada	Brianda Cruz; Mexico
69 kg	Oshae Jones; United States	Myriam Da Silva; Canada	María Moronta; Dominican Republic
75 kg^{[a]}	Naomi Graham; United States	Tammara Thibeault; Canada	Flávia Figueiredo; Brazil
75 kg^{[a]}	Naomi Graham; United States	Tammara Thibeault; Canada	Érika Pachito; Ecuador

^{Women's middleweight} Jessica Caicedo of Colombia originally won the gold medal, but was disqualified for doping violations.

== Qualification ==
A total of 120 boxers qualified to compete at the games (eight per event). The host nation (Peru) received up to seven automatic qualification spots (five men and two women). The remainder of the spots were awarded at the Pan American Games qualifier held in Managua, Nicaragua in April 2019.

== See also ==
- Boxing at the 2020 Summer Olympics
