= 2025 IBA World Boxing Championships – Super heavyweight =

Super heavyweight at the 2025 IBA World Boxing Championships
- Venue: Dubai Duty Free Tennis Stadium
- Location: Dubai, United Arab Emirates
- Dates: 5–13 December
- Competitors: 27

Medalists
gold medal	David Surov	Russia
silver medal	Arman Makhanov	Uzbekistan
bronze medal	Davit Chaloyan	Armenia
bronze medal	Mahammad Abdullayev	Azerbaijan

The Super heavyweight competition at the 2025 IBA Men's World Boxing Championships was held from 5 to 13 December 2025.

== Results ==
=== Finals ===
Semifinals
(Uzbekistan) Arman Makhanov	5
(Armenia) Davit Chaloyan	2
(Russia) David Surov	5
(Azerbaijan) Mahammad Abdullayev	0

Final
(Uzbekistan) Arman Makhanov
(Russia) David Surov	RSC

=== Top half ===
==== Section 1 ====
Round of 32
(Australia) Joshua Cercarelli
(Cuba) Fernando Arzola	RSC-I
(Uzbekistan) Arman Makhanov	KO
Chris Thompson
(Kenya) Clinton Macharia	0
(Belarus) Uladzislau Smiahlikau	5

Round of 16
(Spain) Ayoub Ghadfa
(Cuba) Fernando Arzola	RSC-I
(Uzbekistan) Arman Makhanov	5
(Belarus) Uladzislau Smiahlikau	0

Quarterfinals
(Cuba) Fernando Arzola	0
(Uzbekistan) Arman Makhanov	5

==== Section 2 ====
Round of 32
(Iran) Amir Esmaeili	1
Iman Ramezanpour	4
(Germany) Alexander Kassimov	0
(Tajikistan) Muhammad Abroridinov	5

Round of 16
(Kazakhstan) Nurlan Saparbay	4
Iman Ramezanpour	1
(Tajikistan) Muhammad Abroridinov	0
(Armenia) Davit Chaloyan	5

Quarterfinals
(Kazakhstan) Nurlan Saparbay	0
(Armenia) Davit Chaloyan	5

=== Bottom half ===
==== Section 3 ====
Round of 32
(India) Bikramjeet Singh	0
(Kyrgyzstan) Myrzakir Koshaliev	5
(French Polynesia) Ariitea Putoa	RSC
(Angola) Jordilson Luvo
(Russia) David Surov	WO
(Montenegro) Dimitrije Milić

Round of 16
(New Zealand) George Hola	0
(Kyrgyzstan) Myrzakir Koshaliev	5
(French Polynesia) Ariitea Putoa	0
(Russia) David Surov	5

Quarterfinals
(Kyrgyzstan) Myrzakir Koshaliev	0
(Russia) David Surov	5

==== Section 4 ====
Round of 32
(Uganda) Mark Sabbath	WO
(Libya) Adim Izqayrah
(Turkmenistan) Döwlet Yslamow	5
(Mongolia) Khaligiin Byeknur	0
(Zimbabwe) Anesu Motsi
(Cameroon) Zacharie Mvogo	WO

Round of 16
(Uganda) Mark Sabbath
(Turkmenistan) Döwlet Yslamow	RSC
(Cameroon) Zacharie Mvogo	0
(Azerbaijan) Mahammad Abdullayev	5

Quarterfinals
(Turkmenistan) Döwlet Yslamow	0
(Azerbaijan) Mahammad Abdullayev	5
