= Boxing at the 2023 Pan American Games – Men's +92 kg =

Men's +92 kg at the 2023 Pan American Games
- Venue: Olympic Training Center
- Start date: October 19, 2023
- End date: October 27, 2023
- Competitors: 11 from 11 nations

Medalists
Gold medal	Joshua Edwards	United States
Silver medal	Abner Teixeira	Brazil
Bronze medal	Fernando Arzola	Cuba
Bronze medal	Cristian Salcedo	Colombia

The Men's +92 kg competition of the boxing events at the 2023 Pan American Games in Santiago, Chile, was held between October 19 and 27 at the Olympic Training Center. A total of 11 boxers from 11 NOC's competed.

The two finalists will qualify for the 2024 Summer Olympics in Paris, France.

== Qualification ==
There was a quota of 130 boxers to compete at the games (ten per event). The host nation (Chile) received automatic qualification spots for all events. The remainder of the spots were awarded through various qualifying tournaments. However, the International Olympic Committee’s later decided the competition was an open registration event, meaning any NOC could enter a boxer into the event.

== Competition format ==
Like all Pan American boxing events, the competition is a straight single-elimination tournament. Both semifinal losers are awarded bronze medals, so no boxers compete again after their first loss. Bouts consist of 3 rounds "10-point must" scoring system used, where the winner of each round must be awarded 10 points and the loser a lesser amount, and the elimination of the padded headgear. Five judges scored each bout. The winner will be the boxer who scored the most at the end of the match.

== Results ==
Round of 16 (October 19)
Nigel Paul (TTO)	0
Cristian Salcedo (COL)	5
Delroy Charles (DMA)
Fernando Arzola (CUB)	WO
Gerlon Congo (ECU)	3
Miguel Véliz (CHI)	2

Quarterfinals (October 24)
Marcelo Núñez (PAR)
Cristian Salcedo (COL)	RSC
Javier Cruz (MEX)	0
Abner Teixeira (BRA)	5
Jérôme Feujio (CAN)	0
Fernando Arzola (CUB)	5
Gerlon Congo (ECU)	0
Joshua Edwards (USA)	5

Semifinals (October 26)
Cristian Salcedo (COL)	1
Abner Teixeira (BRA)	4
Fernando Arzola (CUB)	0
Joshua Edwards (USA)	5

Final (October 27)
Abner Teixeira (BRA)
Joshua Edwards (USA)	WO
