= 2026 European Boxing Championships – Men's +90 kg =

Men's +90 kg at the 2026 European Boxing Championships
- Venue: Asics Arena
- Location: Sofia, Bulgaria
- Dates: 18–25 September
- Competitors: 17 from 17 nations

Medalists
gold medal	David Surov	Russia
silver medal	Damar Thomas	England
bronze medal	Ahmed Hagag	Austria
bronze medal	Mahammad Abdullayev	Azerbaijan

The men's +90 kg competition at the 2026 European Boxing Championships was held from 18 to 25 September 2026.

== Results ==
=== Final ===
Final; 25 September
(Russia) David Surov	3
(England) Damar Thomas	2

=== Top half ===
Round of 32; 18 September
(Ukraine) Dmytro Lovchynskyi	4
(Bulgaria) Kiril Georgiev	0

Round of 16; 20 September
(Armenia) Davit Chaloyan	5
(Ukraine) Dmytro Lovchynskyi	0
(Poland) Oskar Safaryan	1
(Russia) David Surov	4
(Croatia) Luka Pratljačić
(Belgium) Mohamed Bourkha	RSC
(Austria) Ahmed Hagag	4
(Germany) Nikita Putilov	1

Quarterfinals; 22 September
(Armenia) Davit Chaloyan	0
(Russia) David Surov	5
(Belgium) Mohamed Bourkha	0
(Austria) Ahmed Hagag	5

Semifinals; 23 September
(Russia) David Surov	5
(Austria) Ahmed Hagag	0

=== Bottom half ===
Round of 16; 20 September
(Norway) Omar Shiha	5
(Belarus) Uladzislau Smiahlikau	0
(Moldova) Nicolai Burdiuja
(Azerbaijan) Mahammad Abdullayev	RSC
(Georgia (country)) Nikoloz Begadze	RSC
(Lithuania) Jonas Jazevičius
(Turkey) Mücahit İlyas	0
(England) Damar Thomas	5

Quarterfinals; 22 September
(Norway) Omar Shiha	2
(Azerbaijan) Mahammad Abdullayev	3
(Georgia (country)) Nikoloz Begadze	0
(England) Damar Thomas	5

Semifinals; 23 September
(Azerbaijan) Mahammad Abdullayev	0
(England) Damar Thomas	5
