= Boxing at the 2019 Pan American Games – Men's +91 kg =

Men's Super heavyweight at the 2019 Pan American Games
- Venue: Miguel Grau Coliseum
- Dates: July 27 – August 1, 2019
- Competitors: 8 from 8 nations

Medalists
Gold medal	Dainier Peró	Cuba
Silver medal	Cristian Salcedo	Colombia
Bronze medal	Ricardo Brown	Jamaica
Bronze medal	Richard Torrez	United States

The Men's super heavyweight competition of the boxing events at the 2019 Pan American Games in Lima, Peru, was held between the 27 of July and the 1 of August 2019 at the Miguel Grau Coliseum.

Like all Pan American boxing events, the competition is a straight single-elimination tournament. Both semifinal losers are awarded bronze medals, so no boxers compete again after their first loss. Bouts consist of a 3 rounds "10-point must" scoring system used in the pro game, where the winner of each round must be awarded 10 points and the loser a lesser amount, and the elimination of the padded headgear. Five judges scored each bout. The winner will be the boxer who scored the most at the end of the match.

== Results ==
=== Bracket ===
Quarterfinals; July 27, 2019
Cristian Salcedo (COL)	5
Nigel Paul (TRI)	0
Ricardo Brown (JAM)	3
Darwin Rodríguez (NCA)	2
Luis Muñoz Munayco (PER)	0
Richard Torrez (USA)	5
Cosme dos Santos (BRA)	0
Dainier Peró (CUB)	5

Semifinals; July 30, 2019
Cristian Salcedo (COL)	5
Ricardo Brown (JAM)	0
Richard Torrez (USA)	2
Dainier Peró (CUB)	3

Final; August 1, 2019
Cristian Salcedo (COL)	1
Dainier Peró (CUB)	4
