= Boxing at the 2020 Summer Olympics – Men's super heavyweight =

Olympic boxing event

Men's super heavyweight at the Games of the XXXII Olympiad
- Boxing pictogram
- Venue: Ryōgoku Kokugikan
- Dates: 24 July 2021; 8 August 2021
- Competitors: 17 from 17 nations

Medalists
1st place, gold medalist(s)		Bakhodir Jalolov; Uzbekistan
2nd place, silver medalist(s)		Richard Torrez; United States
3rd place, bronze medalist(s)		Frazer Clarke; Great Britain
3rd place, bronze medalist(s)		Kamshybek Kunkabayev; Kazakhstan

The men's super heavyweight boxing event at the 2020 Summer Olympics is scheduled to take place between 24 July and 8 August 2021 at the Ryōgoku Kokugikan. 17 boxers from 17 nations are expected to compete.

The medals for the competition were presented by William Frederick Blick, Uganda; IOC Member, and the medalists' bouquets were presented by Morinari Watanabe, Japan; BTF Chair.

== Background ==
This will be the 10th appearance of the men's super heavyweight event. The event was first held in 1984, taking the place of heavyweight as the unlimited weight class (with heavyweight limited to 91 kg at that point), and has been held at every Summer Olympics since. The super heavyweight continues to allow boxers above the 91 kg limit of heavyweight.

Reigning World Champion Bakhodir Jalolov of Uzbekistan has qualified for the Games. Jalolov is a 8–0 professional and resides in California. The 2016 Olympic champion, Tony Yoka of France, turned professional and did not attempt to qualify.

== Qualification ==
A National Olympic Committee (NOC) could enter only 1 qualified boxer in the weight class. There were 17 quota places available for the men's super heavyweight, allocated as follows:

- 2 places at the 2020 African Boxing Olympic Qualification Tournament.
- 3 places at the 2020 Asia & Oceania Boxing Olympic Qualification Tournament.
- 4 places at the 2020 European Boxing Olympic Qualification Tournament.
- 4 places that were intended to be awarded at the 2021 Pan American Boxing Olympic Qualification Tournament, which was cancelled. These places were instead awarded through the world ranking list to the top boxers from the Americas who had been registered for the qualification tournament.
- 4 places that were intended to be awarded at a World Olympic Qualifying Tournament, which was cancelled. These places were instead awarded through the world ranking list, with one place for each continental zone (Africa, Asia & Oceania, Europe, Americas).

No host places or Tripartite Commission invitation places were reserved for the men's super heavyweight.

== Competition format ==
Like all Olympic boxing events, the competition is a straight single-elimination tournament. The competition begins with a preliminary round, where the number of competitors is reduced to 16, and concludes with a final. As there are fewer than 32 boxers in the competition, a number of boxers will receive a bye through the preliminary round. Both semifinal losers are awarded bronze medals.

Bouts consist of three three-minute rounds with a one-minute break between rounds. A boxer may win by knockout or by points. Scoring is on the "10-point-must" system, with 5 judges scoring each round. Judges consider "number of blows landed on the target areas, domination of the bout, technique and tactical superiority and competitiveness." Each judge determines a winner for each round, who receives 10 points for the round, and assigns the round's loser a number of points between 7 and 9 based on performance. The judge's scores for each round are added to give a total score for that judge. The boxer with the higher score from a majority of the judges is the winner.

== Schedule ==
The super heavyweight starts with the round of 32 on 24 July. There are four rest days before the round of 16 on 29 July, two more before the quarterfinals on 1 August, two more before the semifinals on 4 August, and three more before the final on 8 August.

Legend

R32	Round of 32	R16	Round of 16	QF	Quarterfinals	SF	Semifinals	F	Final

Date	Jul 24		Jul 25		Jul 26		Jul 27		Jul 28		Jul 29		Jul 30		Jul 31		Aug 1		Aug 2		Aug 3		Aug 4		Aug 5		Aug 6		Aug 7		Aug 8	
Event	A	E	A	E	A	E	A	E	A	E	A	E	A	E	A	E	A	E	A	E	A	E	A	E	A	E	A	E	A	E	A	E
Men's super heavyweight		R32									R16						QF						SF								F	

== Results ==
=== Finals ===
Final
Bakhodir Jalolov (UZB)	5
Richard Torrez (USA)	0

=== Top half ===
Round of 32
Mahammad Abdullayev (AZE)	3
Danis Latypov (BHR)	1

Round of 16
Bakhodir Jalolov (UZB)	5
Mahammad Abdullayev (AZE)	0
Satish Kumar (IND)	4
Ricardo Brown (JAM)	1
Tsotne Rogava (UKR)	1
Frazer Clarke (GBR)	4
Siyovush Zukhurov (TJK)	0
Mourad Aliev (FRA)	5

Quarterfinals
Bakhodir Jalolov (UZB)	5
Satish Kumar (IND)	0
Frazer Clarke (GBR)	DSQ
Mourad Aliev (FRA)

Semifinals
Bakhodir Jalolov (UZB)	RSC–I
Frazer Clarke (GBR)

=== Bottom half ===
Round of 16
Richard Torrez (USA)	5
Chouaib Bouloudinat (ALG)	0
Dainier Peró (CUB)	5
Cristian Salcedo (COL)	0
Ivan Veriasov (ROC)	5
Maxime Yegnong (CMR)	0
Yousry Hafez (EGY)	0
Kamshybek Kunkabayev (KAZ)	5

Quarterfinals
Richard Torrez (USA)	4
Dainier Peró (CUB)	1
Ivan Veriasov (ROC)	1
Kamshybek Kunkabayev (KAZ)	4

Semifinals
Richard Torrez (USA)	RSC–I
Kamshybek Kunkabayev (KAZ)

== Refereeing problem ==
French heavyweight boxer Mourad Aliev was disqualified for intentionally head-butting Frazer Clarke. In protest of referee Andy Mustacchio's decision and other questionable decisions that have gone against French boxers, Aliev sat on the ring apron and refused to move for over 30 minutes. After briefly leaving, he returned and resumed his protest for an additional 15 minutes. Through an interpreter, Aliev stated, "This was my way of showing that the decision was so unfair. I wanted to fight against all that injustice, and honestly today, also my teammates had unfair results."

== See also ==
- Cheating in Sports
