= 2016 AIBA Youth World Boxing Championships =

Boxing competitions

- Location: Saint Petersburg, Russia
- Dates: 17–26 November

The 2016 AIBA Youth World Boxing Championships was held in Saint Petersburg, Russia, from 17 to 26 November 2016. The competition was under the supervision Brandon smith of the world's governing body for amateur boxing AIBA and is the junior version of the World Amateur Boxing Championships.

== Participating nations ==
351 boxers from 62 nations competed.

- Afghanistan (4)
- Algeria (7)
- Armenia (7)
- Australia (8)
- Azerbaijan (9)
- Belarus (8)
- Canada (3)
- China (10)
- Chinese Taipei (4)
- Colombia (5)
- Croatia (8)
- Cuba (9)
- Czech Republic (5)
- Denmark (4)
- Dominican Republic (4)
- Egypt (4)
- England (8)
- Estonia (2)
- Finland (7)
- France (6)
- Georgia (6)
- Germany (8)
- Greece (1)
- Hungary (9)
- India (10)
- Indonesia (2)
- Ireland (9)
- Israel (5)
- Italy (9)
- Japan (7)
- Kazakhstan (10)
- Kyrgyzstan (8)
- Latvia (4)
- Lithuania (8)
- Mauritius (3)
- Mexico (1)
- Moldova (6)
- Monaco (1)
- Mongolia (2)
- Morocco (6)
- Nepal (2)
- Nicaragua (1)
- Philippines (5)
- Poland (5)
- Puerto Rico (5)
- Romania (9)
- Russia (10)
- Scotland (6)
- Serbia (2)
- Singapore (1)
- Slovakia (3)
- South Korea (7)
- Spain (2)
- Sweden (2)
- Tajikistan (2)
- Thailand (6)
- Turkey (10)
- Ukraine (10)
- United States (9)
- Uzbekistan (10)
- Venezuela (4)
- Wales (3)

== Medal winners ==
| Event | Gold | Silver | Bronze |
|---|---|---|---|
| Light flyweight (49kg) | (India) Sachin Siwach | (Cuba) Jorge Griñán | (United States) Dylan Price |
| Light flyweight (49kg) | (India) Sachin Siwach | (Cuba) Jorge Griñán | (Philippines) Carlo Paalam |
| Flyweight (52kg) | (Japan) Hayato Tsutsumi | (Cuba) Elio Crespo | (Uzbekistan) Otabek Kholmatov |
| Flyweight (52kg) | (Japan) Hayato Tsutsumi | (Cuba) Elio Crespo | (France) Enzo Grau |
| Bantamweight (56kg) | (United States) Marc Castro | (Kazakhstan) Samatali Toltayev | (Australia) Sam Goodman |
| Bantamweight (56kg) | (United States) Marc Castro | (Kazakhstan) Samatali Toltayev | (Uzbekistan) Shunkor Abdurasulov |
| Lightweight (60kg) | (United States) Delante Johnson | (Uzbekistan) Bilolbek Mirzarakhimov | (Turkey) Necat Ekinci |
| Lightweight (60kg) | (United States) Delante Johnson | (Uzbekistan) Bilolbek Mirzarakhimov | (Ukraine) Zoravor Petrosian |
| Light welterweight (64kg) | (Turkey) Tuğrulhan Erdemir | (Russia) Sergei Margarian | (Republic of Ireland) Gabriel Dossen |
| Light welterweight (64kg) | (Turkey) Tuğrulhan Erdemir | (Russia) Sergei Margarian | (Belarus) Pavel Mikhailiuk |
| Welterweight (69kg) | (Kazakhstan) Sadriddin Akhmedov | (Ukraine) Pavlo Gula | (Venezuela) Melbyn Hernández |
| Welterweight (69kg) | (Kazakhstan) Sadriddin Akhmedov | (Ukraine) Pavlo Gula | (England) Harris Akbar |
| Middleweight (75kg) | (Scotland) Willy Hutchinson | (Kazakhstan) Bek Nurmaganbet | (Germany) Vezir Agirman |
| Middleweight (75kg) | (Scotland) Willy Hutchinson | (Kazakhstan) Bek Nurmaganbet | (Republic of Ireland) Michael Nevin |
| Light heavyweight (81kg) | (Cuba) Osvary Morrell | (Ukraine) Roman Savitskyi | (Russia) Sergei Murashev |
| Light heavyweight (81kg) | (Cuba) Osvary Morrell | (Ukraine) Roman Savitskyi | (Kazakhstan) Bekzad Nurdauletov |
| Heavyweight (91kg) | (Cuba) Dainier Peró | (Russia) Vladimir Uzunian | (India) Naman Tanwar |
| Heavyweight (91kg) | (Cuba) Dainier Peró | (Russia) Vladimir Uzunian | (Uzbekistan) Shokhruz Rakhimov |
| Super heavyweight (+91kg) | (Australia) Justis Huni | (Georgia (country)) Giorgi Tchigladze | (Germany) Nelvie Tiafack |
| Super heavyweight (+91kg) | (Australia) Justis Huni | (Georgia (country)) Giorgi Tchigladze | (United States) Richard Torrez |

== Medal table ==
* Host nation (Russia)

| Rank | Nation | Gold | Silver | Bronze | Total |
|---|---|---|---|---|---|
| 1 | Cuba | 2 | 2 | 0 | 4 |
| 2 | United States | 2 | 0 | 2 | 4 |
| 3 | Kazakhstan | 1 | 2 | 1 | 4 |
| 4 | Australia | 1 | 0 | 1 | 2 |
| 4 | India | 1 | 0 | 1 | 2 |
| 4 | Turkey | 1 | 0 | 1 | 2 |
| 7 | Japan | 1 | 0 | 0 | 1 |
| 7 | Scotland | 1 | 0 | 0 | 1 |
| 9 | Russia* | 0 | 2 | 1 | 3 |
| 9 | Ukraine | 0 | 2 | 1 | 3 |
| 11 | Uzbekistan | 0 | 1 | 3 | 4 |
| 12 | Georgia | 0 | 1 | 0 | 1 |
| 13 | Germany | 0 | 0 | 2 | 2 |
| 13 | Ireland | 0 | 0 | 2 | 2 |
| 15 | Belarus | 0 | 0 | 1 | 1 |
| 15 | England | 0 | 0 | 1 | 1 |
| 15 | France | 0 | 0 | 1 | 1 |
| 15 | Philippines | 0 | 0 | 1 | 1 |
| 15 | Venezuela | 0 | 0 | 1 | 1 |
| Totals (19 entries) | | 10 | 10 | 20 | 40 |
