= Josh Edwards =

Josh Edwards may refer to:

- Josh Edwards (footballer, born 2000), Scottish defender for Charlton Athletic
- Josh Edwards, known professionally as Blanco White, English singer-songwriter and guitarist
- Joshua Edwards (boxer), American boxer
