= Boxing at the 2018 Mediterranean Games – Men's super heavyweight =

Boxing competitions

Men's super heavyweight boxing at the 2018 Mediterranean Games
- Venue: Torredembarra Pavilion
- Date: 26–30 June 2018
- Competitors: 9 from 9 nations

Medalists
gold medal	Yousry Hafez	Egypt
silver medal	Mohamed Firisse	Morocco
bronze medal	Djamili-Dini Aboudou	France
bronze medal	Mohamad Mulayes	Syria

The men's super heavyweight competition of the boxing events at the 2018 Mediterranean Games in Tarragona, Spain, was held between June 26 and 30 at the Torredembarra Pavilion.

Like all Mediterranean Games boxing events, the competition was a straight single-elimination tournament. Both semifinal losers were awarded bronze medals, so no boxers competed again after their first loss.

== Schedule ==
All times are Central European Summer Time (UTC+2).

Date	Time	Round
June 26, 2018	20:30	Round of 16
June 28, 2018	20:30	Quarterfinals
June 29, 2018	20:30	Semifinals
June 30, 2018	18:00	Final

== Results ==
=== Bracket ===
Round of 16
Dašo Simeunović (BIH)	0
Yousry Hafez (EGY)	5

Quarterfinals
Eren Uzun (TUR)	0
Yousry Hafez (EGY)	5
Guido Vianello (ITA)	2
Djamili-Dini Aboudou (FRA)	3
Mohamed Firisse (MAR)	KO
Ayoub Ghadfa (ESP)
Amar Adlane Ouarzedine (ALG)	0
Mohamad Mulayes (SYR)	5

Semifinals
Yousry Hafez (EGY)	5
Djamili-Dini Aboudou (FRA)	0
Mohamed Firisse (MAR)	3
Mohamad Mulayes (SYR)	2

Final
Yousry Hafez (EGY)	5
Mohamed Firisse (MAR)	0
