= Joshua Edwards (boxer) =

American boxer

Personal information
- Nickname: The Rocket
- Born: Joshua Timothy Edwards; May 1, 2000 (age 26) Houston, Texas, U.S.
- Height: 6 ft 3 in (191 cm)
- Weight: Heavyweight

Boxing career

Boxing record
- Total fights: 7
- Wins: 7
- Win by KO: 6
Medal record
Men's amateur boxing
Representing United States
Pan American Games
Gold medal – first place	2023 Santiago	Super heavyweight

Joshua Timothy Edwards (born May 1, 2000) is an American professional boxer. As an amateur, Edwards won a gold medal at the 2023 Pan American Games. Edwards also competed at the 2024 Olympics.

== Amateur career ==
=== Pan American Games result ===
Santiago 2023

- Quarter-finals: Defeated German Congo (Ecuador) 5–0
- Semi-finals: Defeated Fernando Arzola (Cuba) 5–0
- Final: Defeated Abner Teixeira (Brazil) WO

=== Olympic Games result ===
Paris 2024

- Round of 16: Defeated by Diego Lenzi (Italy) 3–1

== Professional career ==
=== Early career ===
On January 31, 2025, it was announced that Edwards would be turning professional after signing a promotional deal with Golden Boy Promotions. Edwards made his professional debut on April 24, 2025, in a bout against Larry Gonzales. Edwards secured the win after connecting with a number of unanswered punches in the second round.

== Professional boxing record ==
7 fights	7 wins	0 losses
By knockout	6	0
By decision	1	0

No.	Result	Record	Opponent	Type	Round, time	Date	Location	Notes
7	Win	7–0	Garreth Payton	KO	2 (8)	Jun 20, 2026	Frontwave Arena, Oceanside, California, U.S.	
6	Win	6–0	Brandon Colantonio	UD	6	Feb 21, 2026	T-Mobile Arena, Paradise, Nevada, U.S.	
5	Win	5–0	Zeno Vooris	TKO	3 (6), 2:34	Nov 8, 2025	Dickies Arena, Fort Worth, Texas, U.S.	
4	Win	4–0	Cayman Audie	TKO	1 (6), 1:29	Aug 2, 2025	Credit Union 1 Arena, Chicago, Illinois, U.S.	
3	Win	3–0	Dominicc Hardy	KO	1 (6), 1:03	Jun 28, 2025	Honda Center, Anaheim, California, U.S.	
2	Win	2–0	Alexander Rhodes	KO	1 (6), 2:08	May 30, 2025	The Theater at Virgin Hotels, Paradise, Nevada, U.S.	
1	Win	1–0	Larry Gonzales	KO	2 (4), 1:51	Apr 19, 2025	Frontwave Arena, Oceanside, California, U.S.	
