= Serhiy Radchenko =

Ukrainian boxer (born 1987)

- Born: 10 April 1987 (age 39); Kremenchuk, Ukraine
- Nickname: Kremen
- Height: 6 ft 1 in (185 cm)
- Weight: 213 lb (97 kg; 15 st 3 lb)
- Division: Cruiserweight (Boxing); Bridgerweight (Boxing); Heavyweight (Boxing); Light heavyweight (MMA) (2019–2022)
- Reach: 75 in (191 cm)
- Style: Boxing
- Years active: 2014–present (boxing); 2019–2022 (MMA)

Professional boxing record
- Total: 20
- Wins: 11
- By knockout: 5
- Losses: 9
- By knockout: 3

Mixed martial arts record
- Total: 4
- Wins: 2
- By knockout: 2
- Losses: 2
- By knockout: 1
- By decision: 1

Other information
- Boxing record from BoxRec
- Mixed martial arts record from Sherdog

Serhiy Oleksandrovych Radchenko (Ukrainian: Сергiй Олександрович Радченко; born 10 April 1987) is a Ukrainian professional boxer. He has challenged once for the WBC bridgerweight title in 2025. At regional level, he held the Ukrainian cruiserweight title from 2024 to 2025.

== Amateur career ==
Radchenko competed in the 2009 and 2010 Ukrainian National Championships, losing on points in the quarterfinal and preliminaries.

Prior to turning professional, Radchenko competed in the light-heavyweight division (85 kg) of the 2013 World Series of Boxing (WSB), as part of team Ukraine Otamans, losing against Ramazan Magomedov, Yamil Peralta, Dmitry Bivol and Vitalijus Subacius (UD).

Radchenko competed in the 2013 Ukrainian National Championships, losing on points in the final.

== Professional career ==
Radchenko faced former world cruiserweight champion Krzysztof Glowacki on 10 February 2018, losing an 8-round unanimous decision.

Radchenko faced undefeated Michał Cieślak on 2 June 2018, losing an 8-round UD.

Radchenko faced undefeated Alexey Egorov on 7 December 2019, losing an 10-round UD.

Radchenko faced olympic bronze medalist Kamshybek Kunkabayev on 18 December 2020, losing by corner retirement in the fourth round.

Radchenko faced former world title challenger Artur Szpilka (23–4, 16 KOs) on 7 March 2020, losing a controversial 10-round majority decision. One judge scored the fight a 94–94 draw, whilst the remaining two judges scored the fight 95–93 and 95–92 for Szpilka.

Radchenko challenged Kevin Lerena on 1 May 2025, for the WBC bridgerweight title, losing by technical knockout in the third round.

== Professional boxing record ==
20 fights	11 wins	9 losses
By knockout	5	3
By decision	6	6

No.	Result	Record	Opponent	Type	Round, time	Date	Location	Notes
20	Loss	11–9	Oleksandr Hrytsiv	TKO	1 (10), 3:00	13 Dec 2025	Circus, Lviv, Ukraine	For vacant WBC Francophone heavyweight title
19	Loss	11–8	Kevin Lerena	TKO	3 (12) 0:16	1 May 2025	SunBet Arena, Pretoria, South Africa	For WBC bridgerweight title
18	Win	11–7	Andrej Pesic	UD	12	3 Aug 2024	Sport Palace, Kyiv, Ukraine	Won vacant WBC Silver heavyweight title
17	Win	10–7	Dmytro Serguta	KO	8 (10), 1:35	7 Oct 2023	AKKO International, Kyiv, Ukraine	Won vacant Ukrainian cruiserweight title
16	Win	9–7	Bohdan Borovyi	TKO	1 (6), 1:05	22 Apr 2023	Kyiv, Ukraine	
15	Win	8–7	Igor Pylypenko	TKO	2 (6), 1:10	8 Dec 2021	Pochayna Event Hall, Kyiv, Ukraine	
14	Loss	7–7	Kamshybek Kunkabayev	RTD	4 (8), 3:00	18 Dec 2020	Tynyshpayev Academy Of Transport And Communications, Almaty, Kazakhstan	
13	Loss	7–6	Artur Szpilka	MD	10	7 Mar 2020	Olympians Sports Hall, Łomża, Poland	
12	Loss	7–5	Alexey Egorov	UD	10	7 Dec 2019	RCC Boxing Academy, Yekaterinburg, Russia	
11	Loss	7–4	Ruslan Fayfer	UD	10	19 May 2019	Cortesia, Krasnodar, Russia	
10	Loss	7–3	Adam Balski	UD	8	22 Dec 2018	Hala MOSiR, Radom, Poland	
9	Win	7–2	Archil Gigolashvili	KO	2 (6), 1:05	23 Nov 2018	Freedom Event Hall, Kyiv, Ukraine	
8	Loss	6–2	Michał Cieślak	UD	8	2 Jun 2018	Legionowo Arena, Legionowo, Poland	
7	Loss	6–1	Krzysztof Głowacki	UD	8	10 Feb 2018	Nysa Hall, Nysa, Poland	
6	Win	6–0	Bohdan Zlyvko	KO	4 (4), 2:10	27 Apr 2017	Caribbean Club, Kyiv, Ukraine	
5	Win	5–0	Ivan Lysytsia	UD	4	24 Sep 2016	Olmeca Plage, Kyiv, Ukraine	
4	Win	4–0	Dmytro Zayats	MD	6	3 Oct 2015	Art-Platforma, Kyiv, Ukraine	
3	Win	3–0	Murodbek Azimov	MD	8	13 Jun 2015	Budivelnik, Cherkasy, Ukraine	
2	Win	2–0	Roman Mirzoev	UD	4	18 Apr 2015	Sport Palace, Kyiv, Ukraine	
1	Win	1–0	Igor Pylypenko	UD	4	4 Oct 2014	Arena Lviv, Lviv, Ukraine	

== World Series of Boxing record ==
4 fights	0 wins	4 losses
By decision	0	4

No.	Result	Record	Opponent	Type	Round, time	Date	Location	Notes
4	Loss	0–4	Vitalijus Subacius	UD	5	30 Mar 2013	Forum di Milano, Milan, Italy	
3	Loss	0–3	Dmitry Bivol	UD	5	8 Mar 2013	Konti Sport Recreation Center, Saint Petersburg, Russia	
2	Loss	0–2	Yamil Peralta	UD	5	8 Feb 2013	Znicz Sports Hall, Pruszków, Poland	
1	Loss	0–1	Ramazan Magomedov	UD	5	12 Jan 2013	Sarhadchi Olympic Sport Complex, Baku, Azerbaijan	

== Mixed martial arts record ==
Professional record breakdown
4 matches	2 wins	2 losses
By knockout	2	1
By decision	0	1

Res.	Record	Opponent	Method	Event	Date	Round	Time	Location	Notes
Loss	2–2	Artur Szpilka	TKO (submission to elbow)	KSW 71	June 18, 2022	2	2:52	Toruń, Poland	Catchweight (231 lb) bout.
Loss	2–1	Giorgi Khubejashvili	Decision (unanimous)	WWFC 16	November 2, 2019	3	5:00	Kyiv, Ukraine	
Win	2–0	Stanislav Lashkevish	TKO (punches)	GITC 4	July 13, 2019	1	2:37	Chuhuiv, Ukraine	
Win	1–0	Ivan Reber	TKO (kicks)	WWFC 21	May 5, 2019	1	1:30	Horishni Plavni, Ukraine	Light Heavyweight debut.

Sporting positions
Regional boxing titles
Preceded by Alexander Gurov	Ukrainian cruiserweight champion 7 October 2023 – September 2024; Vacated	Vacant Title next held by Vitaliy Stalchenko
Preceded by Efe Ajagba	WBC Silver heavyweight champion 3 August 2024 – December 2024; Vacated	Vacant Title next held by Lawrence Okolie
