= Dainier Peró =

Cuban boxer (born 1999)

Personal information
- Born: Dainier Christian Peró Justiz; 1 October 1999 (age 27) Camaguey, Cuba
- Height: 6 ft 5 in (196 cm)
- Weight: Heavyweight

Boxing career
- Stance: Orthodox

Boxing record
- Total fights: 13
- Wins: 13
- Win by KO: 10
Medal record
Men's amateur boxing
Representing Cuba
Pan American Games
Gold medal – first place	2019 Lima	Super heavyweight
Youth World Championships
Gold medal – first place	2016 St. Petersburg	Heavyweight

Dainier Christian Peró Justiz (born 1 October 1999) is a Cuban professional boxer. As an amateur, Peró won gold medals at both the 2019 Pan American Games and 2016 Youth World Championships. Peró also competed at the 2020 Olympics. He is the younger brother of professional boxer and 2016 Olympian Lenier Peró, a southpaw who has also won Pan Am Games gold medals, namely the heavyweight gold medal at the 2011 games and the super-heavyweight gold medal at the 2015 games.

== Amateur career ==
=== Highlights ===
Olympic Games result Tokyo 2020

- Round of 16: Defeated Cristian Salcedo (Colombia) 5–0
- Quarter-finals: Defeated by Richard Torrez (USA) 4–1

Pan American Games result Lima 2019

- Quarter-finals: Defeated Cosme dos Santos (Brazil) 5–0
- Semi–finals: Defeated Richard Torrez (USA) 3–2
- Final: Defeated Cristian Salcedo (Colombia) 4–1

== Professional career ==
=== Early career ===
Peró made his professional debut on 2 December 2022, in a bout against Deane Williams. Peró secured a win after knocking his opponent out in the opening round of the bout.

Peró was scheduled to face Cesar Navarro in the main event of Most Valuable Prospects 12 at Caribe Royale Orlando in Orlando, FL on May 9, 2025. Peró won the fight by unanimous decision, though he was dropped twice in the fight.

== Professional boxing record ==
13 fights	13 wins	0 losses
By knockout	10	0
By decision	3	0

No.	Result	Record	Opponent	Type	Round, time	Date	Location	Notes
13	Win	13–0	Donald Haynesworth	RTD	2 (10), 3:00	20 Feb 2026	Caribe Royale Orlando, Orlando, Florida, U.S.	
12	Win	12–0	Mario Aguilar Lopez	RTD	2 (8), 3:00	17 Jan 2026	2300 Arena, Philadelphia, Pennsylvania, U.S.	
11	Win	11–0	Cesar Navarro	UD	10	9 May 2025	Caribe Royale Orlando, Orlando, Florida, U.S.	
10	Win	10–0	Walter Burns	TKO	1 (10), 1:34	13 Dec 2024	Caribe Royale Orlando, Orlando, Florida, U.S.	
9	Win	9–0	Willie Jake Jr	TKO	3 (8), 1:34	19 Oct 2024	Caribe Royale Orlando, Orlando, Florida, U.S.	
8	Win	8–0	James Evans	TKO	5 (8), 2:07	26 Jul 2024	Caribe Royale Orlando, Orlando, Florida, U.S.	
7	Win	7–0	Jose Mario Tamez	TKO	1 (6), 2:00	26 Apr 2024	Caribe Royale Orlando, Orlando, Florida, U.S.	
6	Win	6–0	Joe Jones	TKO	2 (6), 1:36	2 Feb 2024	Caribe Royale Orlando, Orlando, Florida, U.S.	
5	Win	5–0	Quintell Thompson	TKO	1 (4), 1:09	24 Jun 2023	Mississippi Valley Fairgrounds, Davenport, Iowa, U.S.	
4	Win	4–0	Josue Vargas	UD	4	24 Mar 2023	AC Hotel by Marriott, Denver, Colorado, U.S.	
3	Win	3–0	Daniel Zavala	UD	4	11 Feb 2023	Alamodome, San Antonio, Texas, U.S.	
2	Win	2–0	Benjerman Baker	KO	1 (4), 0:19	14 Jan 2023	Fieldhouse USA, Aurora, Colorado, U.S.	
1	Win	1–0	Deane Williams	KO	1 (4), 1:21	2 Dec 2022	Outlaw Saloon, Cheyenne, Wyoming, U.S.	
