= David Surov =

Russian boxer

Personal information
- Nationality: Russia
- Born: 29 December 2004 (age 21) Anapa, Russia

Boxing career
Medal record
Men's amateur boxing
Representing Russia
IBA World Championships
Gold medal – first place	2025 Dubai	Super heavyweight
European Boxing Championships
Gold medal – first place	2026 Sofia	+90 kg

David Igorevich Surov (Russian: Давид Игоревич Суров; born 29 December 2004) is a Russian boxer. He competed at the 2025 IBA Men's World Boxing Championships, winning the gold medal in the super heavyweight event.
