= Delante Johnson =

American boxer (born 1998)

Personal information
- Nickname: Tiger
- Born: August 13, 1998 (age 28) Cleveland, Ohio, U.S.
- Height: 5 ft 10 in (178 cm)
- Weight: Welterweight

Boxing career
- Reach: 71 in (180 cm)
- Stance: Orthodox

Boxing record
- Total fights: 18
- Wins: 18
- Win by KO: 8
Medal record
Men's amateur boxing
Representing United States
Youth World Championships
Gold medal – first place	2016 St. Petersburg	Lightweight
Pan American Games
Bronze medal – third place	2019 Lima	Welterweight
Pan American Championship
Silver medal – second place	2017 Tegucigalpa	Light welterweight
Strandzha Cup
Bronze medal – third place	2018 Sofia	Light welterweight
Bronze medal – third place	2019 Sofia	Welterweight

Delante Johnson (born August 13, 1998) is an American professional boxer. He has held the WBO-NABO welterweight title since November 2025 and the WBO Continental Americas and IBF North American welterweight titles since July 2026. As an amateur, Johnson won a gold medal at the 2016 Youth World Championships and bronze at the 2019 Pan American Games as well as competing at the delayed 2020 Summer Olympics.

== Amateur boxing career ==
Johnson won a gold medal at the 2016 Youth World Championships and bronze at the 2019 Pan American Games. He represented the United States at the delayed 2020 Summer Olympics where he was defeated in the quarterfinals by eventual gold medalist Roniel Iglesias of Cuba.

== Professional boxing career ==
Johnson made his professional debut against Antonius Grable on the Terence Crawford vs. Shawn Porter undercard on November 20, 2021. He won the fight by a fourth-round technical knockout. Johnson next faced the unbeaten Xavier Madrid on January 29, 2022. He won the fight by unanimous decision, with all three judges scoring the fight 40–36 in his favor.

On November 7, 2025 at the RP Funding Center in Lakeland, Florida, Johnson stopped Nicklaus Flaz in the fourth round to win the vacant WBO-NABO welterweight title. He successfully defended the title and added the WBO Continental Americas and vacant IBF North American welterweight titles to his résumé by defeating the previously unbeaten Christopher Guerrero via unanimous decision at the Wolstein Center in Cleveland, Ohio on July 4, 2026.

== Professional boxing record ==
18 fights	18 wins	0 losses
By knockout	8	0
By decision	10	0

No.	Result	Record	Opponent	Type	Round, time	Date	Location	Notes
18	Win	18–0	Christopher Guerrero	UD	10	Jul 4, 2026	Wolstein Center, Cleveland, Ohio, U.S.	Retained WBO-NABO welterweight title, won WBO Continental Americas welterweight title and vacant IBF North American welterweight title
17	Win	17-0	Nicklaus Flaz	TKO	4 (10), 3:00	Nov 7, 2025	RP Funding Center, Lakeland, Florida, U.S.	Won WBO-NABO welterweight title
16	Win	16-0	Janelson Figueroa Bocachica	UD	10	Jun 7, 2025	Scope Arena, Norfolk, Virginia, U.S.	
15	Win	15-0	Kendo Castaneda	TKO	5 (8), 2:00	Mar 29, 2025	Fontainebleau Las Vegas, Winchester, Nevada, U.S.	
14	Win	14-0	Yomar Álamo	UD	8	Sep 27, 2024	Madison Square Garden, New York City, New York, U.S.	
13	Win	13–0	Tarik Zaina	UD	8	Jun 08, 2024	Madison Square Garden, New York City, New York, U.S.	
12	Win	12–0	Paulo Cesár Galdino	TKO	1 (8), 2:49	Feb 16, 2024	The Theater at Madison Square Garden, New York City, New York, U.S.	
11	Win	11–0	Jimerr Espinosa	SD	8	Dec 09, 2023	Charles F. Dodge City Center, Pembroke Pines, Florida, U.S.	
10	Win	10–0	Ricardo Quiroz	MD	8	Sep 15, 2023	American Bank Center, Corpus Christi, Texas, U.S.	
9	Win	9–0	Jonathan Montrel	UD	8	Jul 01, 2023	Huntington Center, Toledo, Ohio, USA	
8	Win	8–0	Alfonso Olvera	UD	8	Apr 1, 2023	Hard Rock Hotel & Casino, Tulsa, Oklahoma, USA	
7	Win	7–0	Mike Ohan Jr.	TKO	5 (6) 1:29	Dec 10, 2022	Madison Square Garden, New York City, New York, U.S.	
6	Win	6–0	Esteban Garcia	UD	6	Oct 29, 2022	Madison Square Garden, New York City, New York, U.S.	
5	Win	5–0	Harry Gigliotti	KO	5 (6) 2:17	Aug 27, 2022	Hard Rock Hotel & Casino, Tulsa, Oklahoma, U.S.	
4	Win	4–0	Agustin Gerbaldo Kucharski	TKO	3 (6), 0:54	May 21, 2022	Resorts World, Winchester, Nevada, U.S.	
3	Win	3–0	Sebastian Gabriel Chaves	TKO	4 (6), 1:42	Mar 26, 2022	Resorts World, Winchester, Nevada, U.S.	
2	Win	2–0	Xavier Madrid	UD	4	Jan 29, 2022	Hard Rock Hotel & Casino, Tulsa, Oklahoma, U.S.	
1	Win	1–0	Antonius Grable	TKO	4 (4), 1:54	Nov 20, 2021	Michelob Ultra Arena, Paradise, Nevada, U.S.	
