= Mark Petrovskii =

Russian boxer (born 1999)

Personal information
- Born: 1 January 1999 (age 27) Sorsk, Khakassia, Russia
- Height: 6 ft 1 in (185 cm)

Boxing career
- Weight class: Heavyweight
- Stance: Southpaw

Boxing record
- Total fights: 7
- Wins: 7
- Win by KO: 5
Medal record
Men's amateur boxing
Representing (Russia) Russian Boxing Federation
IBA World Championships
Gold medal – first place	2021 Belgrade	Super heavyweight

Mark Petrovskii (born 1 January 1999) is a Russian professional boxer.

== Amateur career ==
Petrovskii competed at the 2021 AIBA World Boxing Championships, winning the gold medal in the super heavyweight division.

== Professional career ==
Petrovskii has recorded wins over former world champion Lucas Browne and one-time world title challenger Kevin Johnson.

== Professional boxing record ==
6 fights	6 wins	0 losses
By knockout	4	0
By decision	2	0

No.	Result	Record	Opponent	Type	Round, time	Date	Location	Notes
7	Win	7–0	Lucas Browne	TKO	5 (8), 1:41	9 Dec, 2023	Dubai, UAE	
6	Win	6–0	Kevin Johnson	MD	6	18 Aug, 2023	Moscow, Russia	
5	Win	5–0	Maximiliano Alejandro Sosa	TKO	1 (8), 1:43	12 May 2023	Yunost Sport Palace, Chelyabinsk, Russia	
4	Win	4–0	Vladislav Vishev	TKO	3 (6), 2:51	18 Apr, 2023	Tinkoff Hall, Ufa, Russia	
3	Win	3–0	Abraham Tabul	UD	6	4 Feb, 2023	Sport Palace “Nadezhda”, Serpukhov, Russia	
2	Win	2–0	Akhmad Mamadjanov	TKO	1 (6), 1:55	Dec 21, 2022	Soviet Wings Sport Palace, Moscow, Russia	
1	Win	1–0	Collins Omondi Ojal	RTD	2 (6), 3:00	Feb 25, 2022	REN TV Studio, Moscow, Russia	
