= List of flag bearers for Kazakhstan at the Olympics =

Kazakhstan at the Olympics
- IOC code: KAZ
- NOC: National Olympic Committee of the Republic of Kazakhstan
- Website: www.olympic.kz (in Kazakh)
- Medals: Gold 16 Silver 28 Bronze 42 Total 86

Summer appearances
- 1996; 2000; 2004; 2008; 2012; 2016; 2020; 2024

Winter appearances
- 1994; 1998; 2002; 2006; 2010; 2014; 2018; 2022; 2026; 2030

Other related appearances
- Russian Empire (1900–1912); Soviet Union (1952–1988); Unified Team (1992)

This is a list of flag bearers who have represented Kazakhstan at the Olympics.

Flag bearers carry the national flag of their country at the opening ceremony of the Olympic Games.

#	Event year	Season	Flag bearer	Sport
1	1994	Winter	Kayrat Biekenov	Ski jumping
2	1996	Summer	Yermakhan Ibraimov	Boxing
3	1998	Winter	Vladimir Smirnov	Cross-country skiing
4	2000	Summer	Yermakhan Ibraimov	Boxing
5	2002	Winter	Radik Bikchentayev	Speed skating
6	2004	Summer	Askhat Zhitkeyev	Judo
7	2006	Winter	Aleksandr Koreshkov	Ice hockey
8	2008	Summer	Bakhyt Akhmetov	Weightlifting
9	2010	Winter	Dias Keneshev	Biathlon
10	2012	Summer	Nurmakhan Tinaliyev	Wrestling
11	2014	Winter	Yerdos Akhmadiyev	Cross-country skiing
12	2016	Summer	Ruslan Zhaparov	Taekwondo
13	2018	Winter	Abzal Azhgaliyev	Short track speed skating
14	2020	Summer	Kamshybek Kunkabayev	Boxing
14	2020	Summer	Olga Rypakova	Athletics
15	2022	Winter	Yekaterina Aidova	Speed skating
15	2022	Winter	Abzal Azhgaliyev	Short track speed skating
16	2024	Summer	Olga Safronova	Athletics
16	2024	Summer	Aslanbek Shymbergenov	Boxing

== See also ==
- Kazakhstan at the Olympics
