= Boxing at the 2022 Mediterranean Games – Men's super heavyweight =

Boxing competitions

Men's super heavyweight boxing at the 2022 Mediterranean Games
- Venue: EMEC Hall
- Date: 27 June – 1 July
- Competitors: 8 from 8 nations

Medalists
gold medal	Yousry Hafez	Egypt
silver medal	Vincenzo Fiaschetti	Italy
bronze medal	Chouaib Bouloudinat	Algeria
bronze medal	Djamili Dine Aboudou	France

The men's super heavyweight (+91) competition of the boxing events at the 2022 Mediterranean Games in Oran, Algeria, was held from 27 June to 1 July at the EMEC Hall.

Like all Mediterranean Games boxing events, the competition was a straight single-elimination tournament. Both semifinal losers were awarded bronze medals, so no boxers competed again after their first loss.

== Results ==
Quarterfinals
Mohamed Firisse (MAR)	0
Yousry Hafez (EGY)	3
Uğur Aydemir (TUR)	0
Chouaib Bouloudinat (ALG)	3
Djamili Dine Aboudou (FRA)	3
Mohammad Mlaiyes (SYR)	0
Nelson Hysa (ALB)	1
Vincenzo Fiaschetti (ITA)	2

Semifinals
Yousry Hafez (EGY)	3
Chouaib Bouloudinat (ALG)	0
Djamili Dine Aboudou (FRA)	0
Vincenzo Fiaschetti (ITA)	3

Final
Yousry Hafez (EGY)	2
Vincenzo Fiaschetti (ITA)	1
