= Benjamin Alexander (skier) =

First Jamaican Olympic alpine skier

- Born: 8 May 1983 (age 43); Wellingborough, England
- Education: University College London
- Occupations: Olympic athlete, DJ

Benjamin Alexander (born 8 May 1983) is a British-born Jamaican former disc jockey and the first alpine skier to represent Jamaica in the Olympics.

== Early life ==
Benjamin Alexander was born in Wellingborough, England to a Jamaican father, a bus driver, and British mother in 1983. Having won a government scholarship, he was educated at Wellingborough School, a private school in Northamptonshire. At the age of 17, Alexander began DJing. He began studying physics at Imperial College, London before transferring to University College London to study electrical engineering , graduating in 2006. After university he worked in wealth management in Hong Kong.

== DJ career ==
In 2010, Alexander quit finance to pursue DJing professionally. He spent a decade touring in 30 different countries—eventually performing at Burning Man starting in 2011. By 2015, he was hosting a radio show as well as a weekly party in Ibiza, Spain while co-founding the award-winning music festival, Further Future. Alexander retired from DJing in 2018 but kept his board seat with the charity Robot Heart, a well-known Burning Man camp.

== Skiing career ==
In 2016, Alexander was invited to DJ a ski trip in Whistler, British Columbia, where he had his first mountain lesson. Alexander began pursuing skiing professionally at the end of 2019 after attending the 2018 Winter Olympics as a spectator. He chose to represent Jamaica in international skiing as he acquired Jamaican nationality through his father.

Alexander's first official race was on 9 January 2020, and he qualified for the 2022 Beijing Winter Olympics on 13 January 2022. In preparation of the 2022 games, Alexander maintained weekly mentorship calls with Dudley Stokes, the former Jamaican Olympic bobsledder, since the beginning of 2020.

Alexander raced the giant slalom event on 13 February 2022, finishing in 46th place, and last finisher.

Olympic Games
Preceded by Ricardo Brown; Shelly-Ann Fraser-Pryce	Flag bearer for Jamaica; Beijing 2022 with Jazmine Fenlator-Victorian	Succeeded by Josh Kirlew; Shanieka Ricketts
