= Jazmine Fenlator-Victorian =

American-Jamaican bobsledder

Personal information
- Nationality: American; Jamaican
- Born: 29 August 1985 (age 40) Wayne, New Jersey

Sport
- Sport: Bobsleigh; Track and field
- College team: Rider University

Jazmine Fenlator-Victorian (born August 29, 1985) is an American–Jamaican bobsledder who was one of three pilots of the U.S. Olympic Bobsled team for the 2014 Winter Olympics in Sochi before opting to compete for her father's native country of Jamaica from 2016.

Fenlator grew up in Wayne, New Jersey and graduated from Wayne Valley High School. She graduated from Rider University with a bachelor's degree in multimedia communications and advertising. At Rider, she competed on the track and field team, specializing in shot put, discus, and hammer. Upon graduating from Rider in 2007, Fenlator's track coach suggested she try a bobsled camp.

After spending a few years as a brakeman, Fenlator decided to switch to the driver's seat. By her third season as a pilot, she had earned two World Cup medals – silver in Lake Placid, N.Y. and bronze in Igls, Austria. She was named as one of three pilots of the U.S. Olympic Bobsled team for the 2014 Winter Olympics in Sochi, Russia.

Olympic Games
Preceded by Ricardo Brown; Shelly-Ann Fraser-Pryce	Flag bearer for Jamaica; Beijing 2022 with Benjamin Alexander	Succeeded by Josh Kirlew; Shanieka Ricketts
