= Kamshybek Kunkabayev =

Kazakhstani boxer (born 1991)

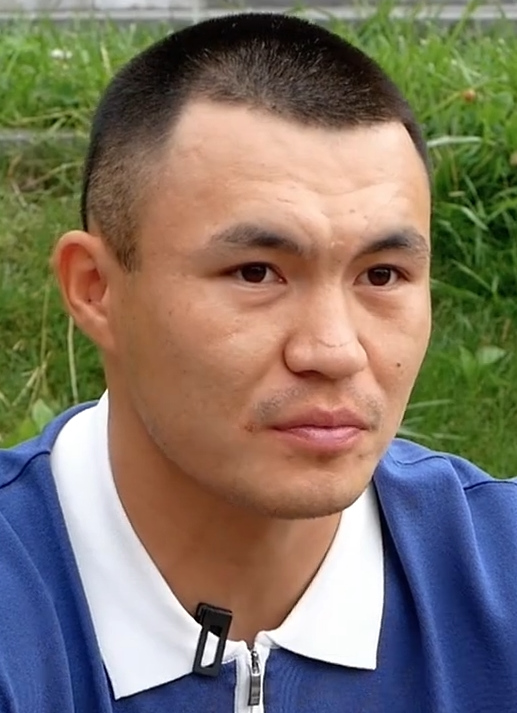
- Kunkabayev in 2020

Personal information
- Nationality: Kazakh
- Born: 18 November 1991 (age 34) Kyzylorda, Kazakh SSR, Soviet Union
- Height: 1.90 m (6 ft 3 in)
- Weight: Cruiserweight

Boxing career
- Stance: Southpaw

Boxing record
- Total fights: 5
- Wins: 5
- Win by KO: 4
Medal record
Men's boxing
Representing Kazakhstan
Olympic Games
Bronze medal – third place	2020 Tokyo	Super heavyweight
World Championships
Silver medal – second place	2017 Hamburg	Super heavyweight
Silver medal – second place	2019 Yekaterinburg	Super heavyweight
Asian Games
Silver medal – second place	2022 Hangzhou	Super heavyweight
Asian Championships
Silver medal – second place	2017 Tashkent	Super heavyweight
Silver medal – second place	2019 Bangkok	Super heavyweight
Silver medal – second place	2021 Dubai	Super heavyweight
Silver medal – second place	2022 Amman	Super heavyweight

Kamshybek Kunkabayev (Қамшыбек Қоңқабаев, born 18 November 1991) is a Kazakhstani professional boxer. He won a silver medal at the 2017 and 2019 World Championships, and bronze at the 2020 Summer Olympics.

== Amateur career ==
=== Olympic result ===
Tokyo 2020

- Round of 16: Defeated Yousry Hafez (Egypt) 5–0
- Quarter-finals: Defeated Ivan Veriasov (ROC) 4–1
- Semi-finals: Defeated by Richard Torrez (USA) RSC

=== World Championship results ===
Hamburg 2017

- Round of 16: Defeated Max Keller (Germany) 5–0
- Quarter-finals: Defeated Bakhodir Jalolov (Uzbekistan) 3–2
- Semi-finals: Defeated Fokou Arsene (Cameroon) 5–0
- Final: Defeated by Magomedrasul Majidov (Azerbaijan) 4–1

2019 Yekaterinburg

- Round of 16: Defeated Ayoub Ghadfa (Spain) KO
- Quarter-finals: Defeated Nelvie Tiafack (Germany) 5–0
- Semi-finals: Defeated Justis Huni (Australia) W/O
- Final: Defeated by Bakhodir Jalolov (Uzbekistan) 5–0

== Professional career ==
=== Early career ===
Kunkabayev made his professional debut against Issa Akberbayev on 23 August 2020. Kunkabayev was dominant throughout the bout and in the second round, he landed a heavy body shot which put his opponent on the canvas. Kunkabayev was declared the winner after Akberbayev was unable to recover from the knockdown.

On 18 December 2020, Kunkabayev fought for a second time as a professional against Serhiy Radchenko. Kunkabayev was declared the winner after his opponent retired in the corner at the end of the fourth round. On 27 February 2021, Kunkabayev fought against Server Emurlaev. Kunkabayev dominated his naturally smaller opponent and at the end of the sixth round, landed a flurry of heavy punches which visibly hurt his opponent. This resulted in Emurlaev retiring in his corner at the end of round, after declining to continue. Kunkabayev faced Steven Ward on 11 December 2021. He won the fight by a seventh-round technical decision. The decision was given at the end of the seventh round, as Ward was unable to continue competing due to a cut on his forehead, which resulted from an accidental clash of heads.

Kunkabayev faced Farrukh Juraev on 25 March 2022, at the Baluan Sholak Sports Palace in Almaty, Kazakhstan. He made quick work of his opponent, as he won the fight by a second-round technical knockout.

== Professional boxing record ==
5 fights	5 wins	0 losses
By knockout	4	0
By decision	1	0

No.	Result	Record	Opponent	Type	Round, time	Date	Location	Notes
5	Win	5–0	Farrukh Juraev	TKO	2 (10), 1:02	25 Mar 2022	Baluan Sholak Sports Palace, Almaty, Kazakhstan	
4	Win	4–0	Steven Ward	TD	7 (10), 1:05	11 Dec 2021	CSKA Sport Complex, Almaty, Kazakhstan	Won vacant WBA Gold cruiserweight title
3	Win	3–0	Server Emurlaiev	RTD	6 (10), 3:00	27 Feb 2021	Tynyshpayev Academy of Transport and Communications, Almaty, Kazakhstan	Won vacant WBO Asia Pacific cruiserweight title
2	Win	2–0	Serhiy Radchenko	RTD	4 (8), 3:00	18 Dec 2020	Tynyshpayev Academy of Transport and Communications, Almaty, Kazakhstan	
1	Win	1–0	Issa Akberbayev	TKO	2 (8), 2:24	23 Aug 2020	Tynyshpayev Academy of Transport and Communications, Almaty, Kazakhstan	

Sporting positions
Regional boxing titles
Vacant Title last held by Jai Opetaia	WBO Asia Pacific cruiserweight champion 27 February 2021 – present	Incumbent
Vacant Title last held by Alexey Egorov	WBA Gold cruiserweight champion 11 December 2021 – present	Incumbent
Olympic Games
Preceded by Ruslan Zhaparov	Flagbearer for Kazakhstan (with Olga Rypakova); Tokyo 2020	Succeeded by Incumbent
