= Joseph Goodall (boxer) =

Australia boxer (born 1992)

Personal information
- Nickname: Big Bad Joe
- Born: 22 June 1992 (age 34) Bendigo, Australia
- Height: 197 cm (6 ft 6 in)
- Weight: Heavyweight; Super-heavyweight

Boxing career
- Stance: Orthodox

Boxing record
- Total fights: 15
- Wins: 12
- Win by KO: 11
- Losses: 2
- Draws: 1
Medal record
Men's amateur boxing
Representing Australia
World Championships
Bronze medal – third place	2017 Hamburg	Super-heavyweight
Commonwealth Games
Silver medal – second place	2014 Glasgow	Super-heavyweight

Joseph Goodall (born 22 June 1992) is an Australian professional boxer who has held the WBC Australasia heavyweight title since March 2021. As an amateur he won a silver medal at the 2014 Commonwealth Games and bronze at the 2017 World Championships, becoming Australia's first medalist at the World Championships since 1991.

== Professional boxing record ==
15 fights	12 wins	2 losses
By knockout	11	1
By decision	1	1
Draws	1	

No.	Result	Record	Opponent	Type	Round, time	Date	Location	Notes
15	Win	12–2–1	Bowie Tupou	TKO	4 (10), 2:53	26 Apr 2025	Nissan Arena, Nathan, Australia	Retained WBA Oceania Heavyweight title
14	Win	11–2–1	Faiga Opelu	TKO	10 (10)	12 May 2024	RAC Arena, Perth, Australia	
13	Loss	10–2–1	Efe Ajagba	TKO	4 (10), 0:50	4 Nov 2023	Tahoe Blue Event Center, Stateline, Nevada, U.S.	For WBC International heavyweight title
12	Win	10–1–1	Stephan Shaw	TKO	6 (8), 2:55	22 Jul 2023	Firelake Arena, Shawnee, Oklahoma, US	
11	Win	9–1–1	Arsene Fosso	TKO	3 (6), 1:20	15 Sep 2022	Nissan Arena, Brisbane, Australia	
10	Loss	8–1–1	Justis Huni	UD	10	15 Jun 2022	Nissan Arena, Brisbane, Australia	For vacant IBF Pan Pacific and WBO Oriental heavyweight titles
9	Win	8–0–1	Mathew McKinney	KO	1 (8), 1:55	26 Mar 2022	Minneapolis Armory, Minneapolis, Minnesota, US	
8	Win	7–0–1	Herman Ene-Purcell	TKO	2 (10), 2:58	27 Mar 2021	Rumours International Convention Centre, Toowoomba, Australia	Won vacant WBC Australasia heavyweight title
7	Draw	6–0–1	Christian Ndzie Tsoye	MD	6	31 Aug 2019	Bendigo Stadium, Bendigo, Australia	
6	Win	6–0	Sumit Rangi	TKO	1 (6), 2:49	28 Jun 2019	Acacia Ridge Hotel, Brisbane, Australia	
5	Win	5–0	Christian Ndzie Tsoye	UD	4	30 Nov 2018	Suncorp Stadium, Brisbane, Australia	
4	Win	4–0	Colin Wilson	TKO	1 (4), 2:09	15 Sep 2018	Pullman & Mercure Hotel, Brisbane, Australia	
3	Win	3–0	Braxton Edmonds	TKO	1 (4), 2:27	29 Jun 2018	Pullman & Mercure Hotel, Brisbane, Australia	
2	Win	2–0	Barry Prior	TKO	1 (4), 0:40	26 May 2018	Greenbank Community Centre, Logan, Australia	
1	Win	1–0	Lui Te'o	TKO	1 (4), 2:14	7 Apr 2018	Convention & Exhibition Centre, Brisbane, Australia	
