= Nelvie Tiafack =

Cameroonian-German boxer (born 1999)

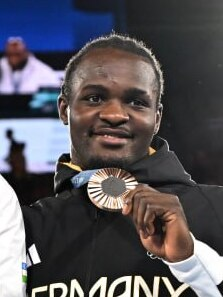
- Tiafack at the 2024 Summer Olympics

Personal information
- Full name: Nelvie Raman Tiafack
- Born: 3 January 1999 (age 27) Buea, Cameroon

Sport
- Country: Germany
- Sport: Boxing
Medal record
Men's boxing
Representing Germany
Olympic Games
Bronze medal – third place	2024 Paris	Super heavyweight
European Games
Bronze medal – third place	2019 Minsk	Super heavyweight
Bronze medal – third place	2023 Kraków-Małopolska	Super heavyweight
European Championships
Gold medal – first place	2022 Yerevan	Super heavyweight
Bronze medal – third place	2019 Minsk	Super heavyweight

Nelvie Raman Tiafack (born 3 January 1999) is a Cameroonian-German boxer. He competed in the 2024 Summer Olympics in the men's +92 kg weight division and reached the semifinals after defeating Mahammad Abdullayev and Diego Lenzi.

== Professional boxing record ==
5 fights	5 wins	0 losses
By knockout	4	0
By decision	1	0

No.	Result	Record	Opponent	Type	Round, time	Date	Location	Notes
5	Win	5–0	Salvador Zavala Molina	KO	3 (6), 0:55	21 Aug 2026	Pechanga Resort & Casino, Temecula, California, U.S.	
4	Win	4–0	Mateus Munhoz da Penha	UD	6	15 May 2026	SAP Arena, Manheim, Germany	
3	Win	3–0	Piotr Ćwik	TKO	2 (6), 1:50	10 Jan 2026	Rudolf Weber-Arena, Oberhausen, Germany	
2	Win	2–0	Ramiro Edwin Robles	RTD	4 (6), 3:00	27 Sep 2025	Théâtre Saint-Denis, Montreal, Canada	
1	Win	1–0	Jakub Sosinski	TKO	2 (6), 1:37	19 Jul 2025	SNP-Dome, Heidelberg, Germany	
