= Alexey Egorov =

Russian boxer (born 1991)

Alexey Egorov Алексей Егоров
Personal information
- Born: 16 June 1991 (age 35) Obninsk, Russia
- Height: 1.85 m (6 ft 1 in)
- Weight: Cruiserweight

Boxing career
- Reach: 187 cm (74 in)
- Stance: Orthodox

Boxing record
- Total fights: 14
- Wins: 12
- Win by KO: 8
- Losses: 2
Medal record
Men's amateur boxing
Representing Russia
European Championships
| Gold medal – first place | 2013 Minsk | Heavyweight |
Russian National Championships
| Silver medal – second place | 2012 Syktyvkar | Heavyweight |
| Gold medal – first place | 2013 Khabarovsk | Heavyweight |
| Silver medal – second place | 2014 Rostov-on-Don | Heavyweight |
| Silver medal – second place | 2015 Samara | Heavyweight |

Alexey Yurievich Egorov (Russian: Алексей Юрьевич Егоров; also spelled Aleksey or Aleksei, born 16 June 1991) is a Russian professional boxer. As an amateur, he won a gold medal at the 2013 European Championships.

== Amateur career ==
- 2012 2nd place at Russian National Championships at 91 kg, losing to Evgeny Tishchenko
- 2013 Won Russian National Championships at 91 kg
  - Final: Defeated Sergey Kalchugin
- 2013 Won European Amateur Championships in Minsk, Belarus at 91 kg. Results were:
  - Final: Defeated Teymur Mammadov (Azerbaijan) RSC 2
- 2014 2nd place at Russian National Championships at 91 kg, losing to Evgeny Tishchenko
- 2015 2nd place at Russian National Championships at 91 kg.

== Professional career ==
Egorov made his professional debut against Lukasz Rusiewicz on 3 December 2016. He won the fight by a second-round technical knockout. Egorov amassed a 7-0 record during the next three years, with six stoppages, before being booked to fight Thomas Oosthuizen for the vacant IBF International Cruiserweight title on 23 March 2019. He won the fight by unanimous decision, with scores of 100-90, 99-91, and 98-92. Egorov faced Roman Golovashchenko three months later, on 16 June 2019. HE won the fight by a third-round technical knockout. Egorov faced Serhiy Radchenko on 7 December 2019, in his final fight of 2019. He won the fight by unanimous decision, with all three judges awarding him a 100-89 scorecard. Egorov fought once in 2020, against Vasil Ducar on 12 March 2020, in a stay-busy fight. He won the fight by unanimous decision, with scores of 99-92, 97-94 and 97-94.

On 12 February 2021, the WBA ordered their "Super" cruiserweight champion Arsen Goulamirian to make a mandatory title defense against Egorov. They were given a 30-day negotiation period, starting with February 11, 2021. After a thirty day period of unsuccessful negotiations, a purse bid was held, with a 65-35 split for Goulamirian. The bid was won by World of Boxing, who submitted a bid of $210 000. The fight was eventually scheduled for December 10, 2021, at the RCC Boxing Academy in Yekaterinburg, Russia. Goulamirian was later forced to withdraw from the bout, as he tested positive for COVID-19. On 23 August 2022, the WBA once again ordered Goulamirian to face Egorov, giving the fighters 15 days to negotiate the terms of the bout. As they failed to do so, a purse bid was called, which was won by Y2 Boxing who bid $364,000. The title bout was booked to take place on 19 November 2022. He lost the fight by unanimous decision.

== Professional boxing record ==
| 14 fights | 12 wins | 2 losses |
|---|---|---|
| By knockout | 8 | 0 |
| By decision | 4 | 2 |

| No. | Result | Record | Opponent | Type | Round, time | Date | Location | Notes |
|---|---|---|---|---|---|---|---|---|
| 14 | Loss | 12–2 | Brandon Glanton | KO | 11 (12), 2:08 | 7 Jun 2024 | Dynamo Sports Palace, Yekaterinburg, Russia | |
| 13 | Win | 12–1 | Vladimir Zhigaylov | TKO | 1 (8), 0:28 | 6 May 2023 | KRK Uralets, Yekaterinburg, Russia | |
| 12 | Loss | 11–1 | Arsen Goulamirian | UD | 12 | 19 Nov 2022 | La Palestre, Le Cannet, France | For WBA (Super) cruiserweight title |
| 11 | Win | 11–0 | Vasil Ducar | UD | 10 | 12 Mar 2020 | Pyramide, Kazan, Russia | |
| 10 | Win | 10–0 | Serhiy Radchenko | UD | 10 | 7 Dec 2019 | RCC Boxing Academy, Yekaterinburg, Russia | |
| 9 | Win | 9–0 | Roman Golovashchenko | TKO | 3 (12), 0:53 | 16 Jun 2019 | KRK Uralets, Yekaterinburg, Russia | |
| 8 | Win | 8–0 | Thomas Oosthuizen | UD | 10 | 23 Mar 2019 | RCC Boxing Academy, Yekaterinburg, Russia | Wins vacant IBF International cruiserweight title |
| 7 | Win | 7–0 | Hamilton Ventura | KO | 4 (10), 2:27 | 23 Mar 2019 | Soviet Wings Sport Palace, Moscow, Russia | |
| 6 | Win | 6–0 | Lateef Kayode | RTD | 6 (10), 3:00 | 20 Jul 2018 | Florentine Gardens, El Monte, California, U.S. | |
| 5 | Win | 5–0 | Luther Smith | TKO | 1 (10), 2:31 | 2 Jun 2018 | Boardwalk Hall, Atlantic City, New Jersey, U.S. | |
| 4 | Win | 4–0 | Andrei Kniazev | TKO | 4 (10), 0:51 | 27 Nov 2017 | Luzhniki Stadium, Moscow, Russia | Wins Russia National cruiserweight title |
| 3 | Win | 3–0 | Carlos Ailton Nascimento | TKO | 5 (8), 1:05 | 1 Jul 2017 | Luzhniki Stadium, Moscow, Russia | |
| 2 | Win | 2–0 | Alexander Kubich | UD | 6 | 3 Jun 2017 | Rostov-on-Don Palace of Sports, Rostov-on-Don, Russia | |
| 1 | Win | 1–0 | Lukasz Rusiewicz | TKO | 2 (6), 2:23 | 3 Dec 2016 | Megasport Sport Palace, Moscow, Russia | |
