= Ricardo Brown (boxer) =

Jamaican boxer (born 1990)

Personal information
- Nationality: Jamaican
- Born: 7 February 1990 (age 36) Spanish Town, Jamaica
- Weight: Heavyweight

Boxing career
Medal record
Men's Amateur Boxing
Representing Jamaica
Pan American Games
Bronze medal – third place	2019 Lima	Super heavyweight

Ricardo Brown (born 7 February 1990) is a Jamaican boxer. He competed in the men's super heavyweight event at the 2020 Summer Olympics.

Olympic Games
Preceded by Audra Segree	Flag bearer for Jamaica; Tokyo 2020 with Shelly-Ann Fraser-Pryce	Succeeded by Benjamin Alexander; Jazmine Fenlator-Victorian
