= Delicious Orie =

British boxer (born 1997)

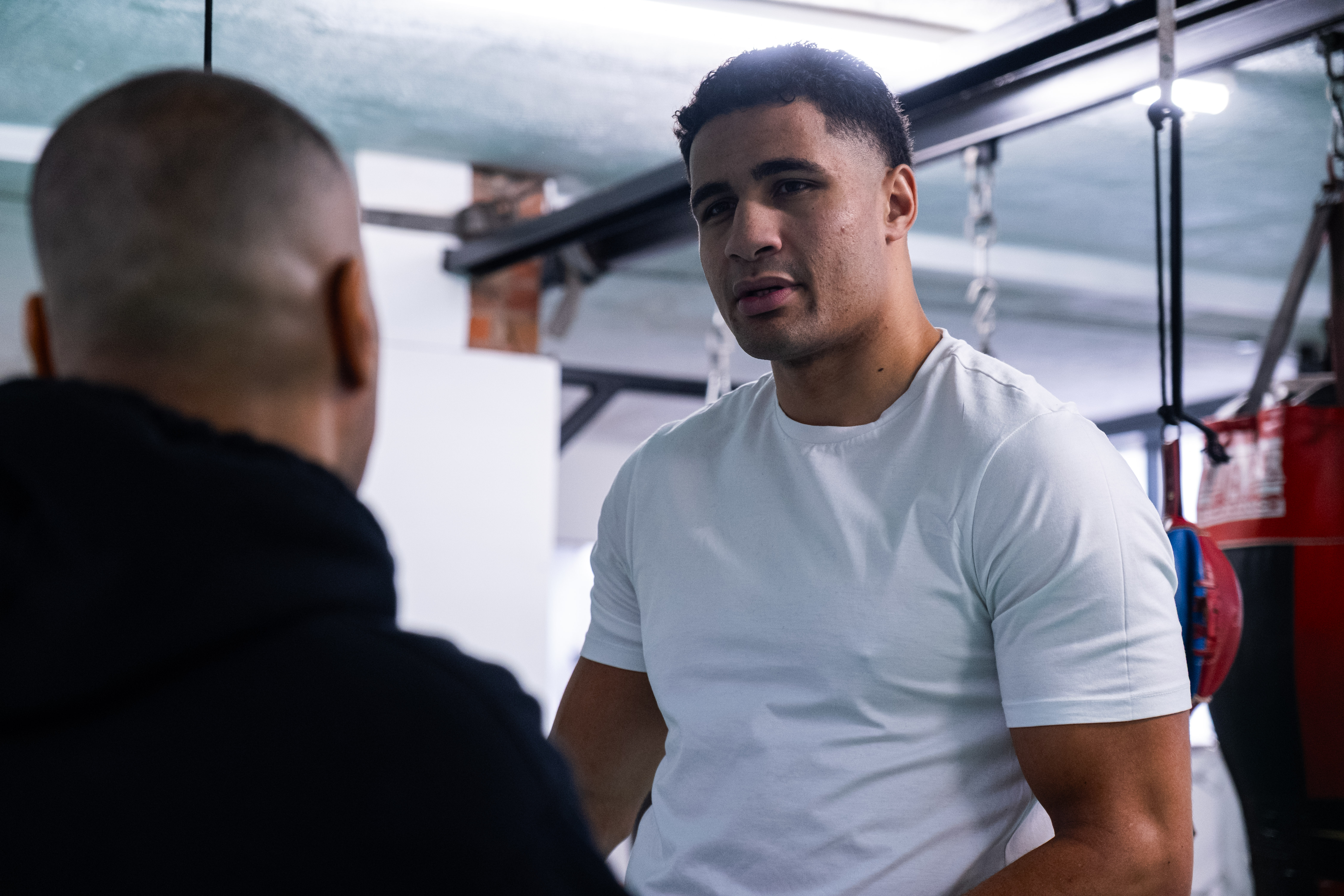
- Orie coaching a boxing session in Wolverhampton

Personal information
- Full name: Delicious Justin Orie
- Nationality: Russian; British
- Born: 31 May 1997 (age 29) Moscow, Russia
- Height: 6 ft 6 in (198 cm)

Boxing career
- Weight class: Heavyweight
- Stance: Orthodox

Boxing record
- Total fights: 1
- Wins: 1
Medal record
Men's amateur boxing
Representing Great Britain
European Games
Gold medal – first place	2023 Kraków-Małopolska	Super heavyweight
Representing England
Commonwealth Games
Gold medal – first place	2022 Birmingham	Super-heavyweight
European Championships
Bronze medal – third place	2022 Yerevan	Super-heavyweight
English National Championships
Gold medal – first place	2019 Nottingham	Super-heavyweight

Delicious Justin Orie (born 31 May 1997) is a British former professional boxer who as an amateur won gold medals at the 2022 Commonwealth Games and the 2023 European Games.

== Early life ==
Orie was born in Moscow to a Nigerian father and a Russian mother. Facing racial prejudice due to the colour of his skin, he moved to England at age seven and settled in Wolverhampton a few years later and attended Colton Hills Community School in his teenage years. Orie later graduated with a degree in Economics and Management from Aston University in 2020.

His father revealed in a BBC interview that Orie's name was inspired by vocalist Delious Kennedy from the American R&B and pop group All-4-One.

== Amateur career ==
Orie won a bronze medal at the 2022 European Championships.

He won gold medals at the 2022 Commonwealth Games in England and the 2023 European Games in Poland. In doing the latter he qualified a quota place in the super-heavyweight category for the 2024 Summer Olympics. On 7 June 2024, Orie was officially announced among the Great Britain squad for the Olympics in Paris. He was drawn to fight 2021 AIBA World Boxing Championships silver medalist Davit Chaloyan from Armenia in the first round and lost by 3:2 split decision.

== Professional career ==
Orie turned professional in February 2025, signing with Frank Warren's Queensberry Promotions. He made his pro-debut at the Co-op Live Arena in Manchester on 5 April 2025, defeating Milos Veletic on points over four rounds.

== Retirement ==
Orie announced his retirement from professional boxing on 27 May 2025, stating that the "fire and love I once had for boxing has gradually faded" and he intended to move into the "corporate world".

== Professional boxing record ==
1 fight	1 win	0 losses
By decision	1	0

No.	Result	Record	Opponent	Type	Round, time	Date	Location	Notes
1	Win	1–0	Milos Veletic	PTS	4	5 Apr 2025	Co-op Live, Manchester, England	
