= Ahmed Hagag =

Austrian boxer

Personal information
- Nationality: Austria

Boxing career
Medal record
Men's amateur boxing
Representing Austria
EUBC European Championships
| Bronze medal – third place | 2022 Yerevan | Super heavyweight |
EB European Championships
| Bronze medal – third place | 2026 Sofia | +90 kg |

Ahmed Hagag is an Austrian boxer. He competed at the 2022 European Amateur Boxing Championships, winning the bronze medal in the super heavyweight event. He also competed at the 2026 European Amateur Boxing Championships, winning the bronze medal in the men's +90 kg.
