= Mourad Kadi =

Algerian boxer

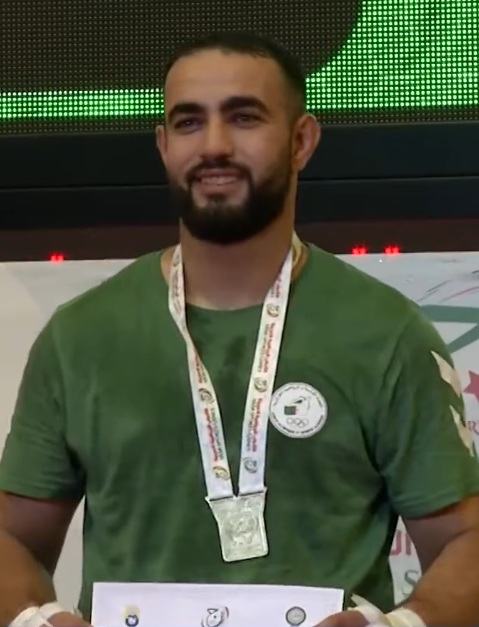
- Kadi in 2023

Personal information
- Nationality: Algeria
- Born: 26 June 1995 (age 31) Naciria, Algeria

Boxing career
Medal record
Men's amateur boxing
Representing Algeria
African Championships
Silver medal – second place	2022 Maputo	+92 kg
Bronze medal – third place	2023 Yaoundé	+92 kg
Arab Games
Gold medal – first place	2023 Algiers	+92 kg

Mourad Kadi (born 26 June 1995) is an Algerian boxer. He competed in the men's +92 kg event at the 2024 Summer Olympics.
