= Mahammad Abdullayev =

Azerbaijani boxer (born 1999)

Personal information
- Nationality: Azerbaijani
- Born: 6 April 1999 (age 27)

Sport
- Sport: Boxing
Medal record
Men's amateur boxing
Representing Azerbaijan
IBA World Championships
Bronze medal – third place	2021 Belgrade	Super heavyweight
Bronze medal – third place	2023 Tashkent	Super heavyweight
Bronze medal – third place	2025 Dubai	Super heavyweight
European Games
Silver medal – second place	2023 Kraków-Małopolska	Super heavyweight
EB European Championships
Bronze medal – third place	2026 Sofia	+90 kg

Mahammad Abdullayev (Azerbaijani: Məhəmməd Ramazan oğlu Abdullayev, born 6 April 1999) is an Azerbaijani boxer. He competed in the 2020 Summer Olympics at super heavyweight but lost to eventual winner Bakhodir Jalolov in the second round. He then contested the men's super heavyweight division at the 2021 World Championships, where he won a bronze medal.
