= Djamili-Dini Aboudou Moindze =

French boxer (born 1996)

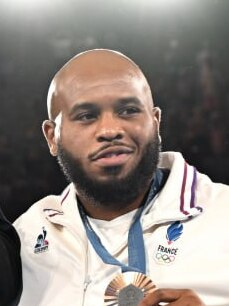
- Moindze at the 2024 Summer Olympics

Personal information
- Born: 16 February 1996 (age 30) Grande-Synthe, France

Sport
- Country: France
- Sport: Boxing
Medal record
Men's boxing
Representing France
Olympic Games
| Bronze medal – third place | 2024 Paris | Super heavyweight |
European Championships
| Bronze medal – third place | 2017 Kharkiv | Super heavyweight |
Mediterranean Games
| Gold medal – first place | 2026 Taranto | Super heavyweight |
| Bronze medal – third place | 2018 Tarragona | Super heavyweight |
| Bronze medal – third place | 2022 Oran | Super heavyweight |

Djamili-Dini Aboudou Moindze (born 16 February 1996) is a French boxer of Comorian descent who won a bronze medal at the 2024 Summer Olympics. He competed at the men's +92 kg weight division and reached the semifinals after defeating Mourad Kadi and Gerlon Congo.
