= Richard Torrez =

American professional boxer

Personal information
- Nicknames: The Gentleman Boxer; Kiki
- Born: June 1, 1999 (age 27) Tulare, California, U.S.
- Height: 6 ft 2 in (188 cm)
- Weight: Heavyweight

Boxing career
- Reach: 193 cm (76 in)
- Stance: Southpaw

Boxing record
- Total fights: 15
- Wins: 14
- Win by KO: 12
- Losses: 1
Medal record
Men's amateur boxing
Representing the United States
Olympic Games
Silver medal – second place	2020 Tokyo	Super-heavyweight
Pan American Games
Bronze medal – third place	2019 Lima	Super heavyweight
Golden Gloves
Gold medal – first place	2017 Lafayette	Super-heavyweight
U.S. National Championships
Gold medal – first place	2017 Salt Lake City	Super-heavyweight
Gold medal – first place	2018 Salt Lake City	Super-heavyweight
U.S. Youth National Championships
Gold medal – first place	2014 Reno	Super-heavyweight
Gold medal – first place	2015 Reno	Super-heavyweight
Gold medal – first place	2016 Reno	Super-heavyweight
Youth World Championships
Bronze medal – third place	2016 Saint Petersburg	Super-heavyweight

Richard Torrez Jr. (born June 1, 1999) is an American professional boxer. As an amateur, he won a silver medal at the 2020 Olympics.

== Early life and education ==
Torrez graduated from Palo Verde Elementary School in his native Tulare, California, in 2013. He competed on the chess team for Mission Oak High School, where he graduated as valedictorian in 2017. Torrez and his friends in the school's robotics club were nearly suspended for trying to develop more efficient rocket fuel. "At high school, I think what surprised me most is I liked hanging out with the nerds more than I liked hanging out with the athletes," he said. Citing how Vasyl Lomachenko learned dance to improve his boxing footwork, Torrez began studying ballet at the College of the Sequoias. He fell in love with it, and eventually played the part of Gaston in a production of Beauty and the Beast, an experience he found more terrifying than the Olympics.

== Amateur career ==
He won a bronze medal at the 2019 Pan American Games in Super Heavyweight and placed 5th at the 2019 AIBA World Boxing Championships in the same weight class. He won a silver medal at the 2020 Olympics, losing to professional boxer Bakhodir Jalolov in the final.

== Professional career ==
=== Early career ===
On March 3, 2024, at Desert Diamond Arena in Glendale, AZ, Torrez defeated Donald Haynesworth via first-round TKO.

Torrez was scheduled to face Brandon Moore on May 18, 2024, at Pechanga Arena in San Diego, CA. Torrez won the fight by TKO in the fifth round.

Torrez was scheduled to face Joey Dawejko at Desert Diamond Arena in Glendale, AZ on September 20, 2024. He won the fight via fifth-round disqualification of his opponent, who lost his mouthpiece multiple times throughout the bout.

Torrez was scheduled to face Guido Vianello in Las Vegas on April 5, 2025. Torrez Jr would win the fight by unanimous decision (98–91, 98–91, 97–92). Vianello was deducted a point for holding in the second round. Due to the high volume of holding and the sporadic nature of the action, the fight was criticized by the boxing press as being "ugly," though Torrez's ability to pressure and land his right hook out of his southpaw stance was commended.

In his next bout, he stopped Tomáš Šálek in the first round at Arena Coliseo in San Luis Potosí, Mexico, on November 15, 2025.

Torrez suffered the first defeat of his professional career when he was knocked out 55 seconds into the second round of his fight with Frank Sánchez at the Pyramids of Giza in Egypt on May 23, 2026.

== Personal life ==
Torrez Jr. represents the third generation of a boxing family from San Joaquin Valley, California. His great-grandfather, Juan Torrez, emigrated from Fresnillo, Mexico in 1920. His grandfather Manuel Torrez, was a southwest (USA) Golden Gloves champion and his father and coach Richard Torrez Sr. reached the quarterfinals in the U.S. Trials for the 1984 Olympics.

In his spare time, Torrez Jr. enjoys building rockets with his friends from high school.

== Professional boxing record ==
15 fights	14 wins	1 loss
By knockout	12	1
By decision	1	0
By disqualification	1	0

No.	Result	Record	Opponent	Type	Round, time	Date	Location	Notes
15	Loss	14–1	Frank Sánchez	KO	2 (12), 0:55	May 23, 2026	Pyramids of Giza, Giza, Egypt	
14	Win	14–0	Tomáš Šálek	TKO	1 (10), 2:45	Nov 15, 2025	Arena Coliseo, San Luis Potosí, Mexico	Retained WBC-NABF, and WBO-NABO heavyweight titles
13	Win	13–0	Guido Vianello	UD	10	Apr 5, 2025	Palms Casino Resort, Las Vegas, Nevada U.S.	Won vacant IBF North American, WBC-NABF, and WBO-NABO heavyweight titles
12	Win	12–0	Issac Munoz Gutierrez	TKO	3 (8), 0:59	Dec 7, 2024	Footprint Center, Phoenix, Arizona, U.S.	Retained WBC-NABF Junior heavyweight title
11	Win	11–0	Joey Dawejko	DQ	5 (8), 2:02	Sep 20, 2024	Desert Diamond Arena, Glendale, Arizona, U.S.	Retained WBC-NABF Junior heavyweight title; Dawejko disqualified for excessive loss of mouthpiece
10	Win	10–0	Brandon Moore	TKO	5 (8), 1:39	May 18, 2024	Pechanga Arena, San Diego, California, U.S.	Won vacant WBC-NABF Junior heavyweight title
9	Win	9–0	Donald Haynesworth	TKO	1 (8), 2:19	Mar 29, 2024	Desert Diamond Arena, Glendale, Arizona, U.S.	
8	Win	8–0	Curtis Harper	TKO	8 (8), 2:03	Dec 9, 2023	Charles F. Dodge City Center, Pembroke Pines, Florida, U.S.	
7	Win	7–0	Tyrrell Anthony Herndon	KO	2 (6), 1:26	Oct 14, 2023	Fort Bend EpiCenter, Rosenberg, Texas, U.S.	
6	Win	6–0	Willie Jake Jr	KO	1 (6), 1:22	Aug 12, 2023	Desert Diamond Arena, Glendale, Arizona, U.S.	
5	Win	5–0	James Bryant	RTD	1 (6), 3:00	Feb 3, 2023	Desert Diamond Arena, Glendale, Arizona, U.S.	
4	Win	4–0	Ahmed Hefny	KO	3 (6), 2:36	Oct 29, 2022	Madison Square Garden, New York City, New York, U.S.	
3	Win	3–0	Marco Antonio Canedo	KO	1 (6), 0:44	Aug 27, 2022	Hard Rock Hotel & Casino, Tulsa, Oklahoma, U.S.	
2	Win	2–0	Roberto Zavala Jr	KO	1 (6), 0:58	Jul 15, 2022	Pechanga Resort & Casino, Temecula, California, U.S.	
1	Win	1–0	Allen Melson	KO	2 (6), 1:23	Mar 4, 2022	Save Mart Center, Fresno, California, U.S.	
