= Abner Teixeira =

Brazilian boxer (born 1996)

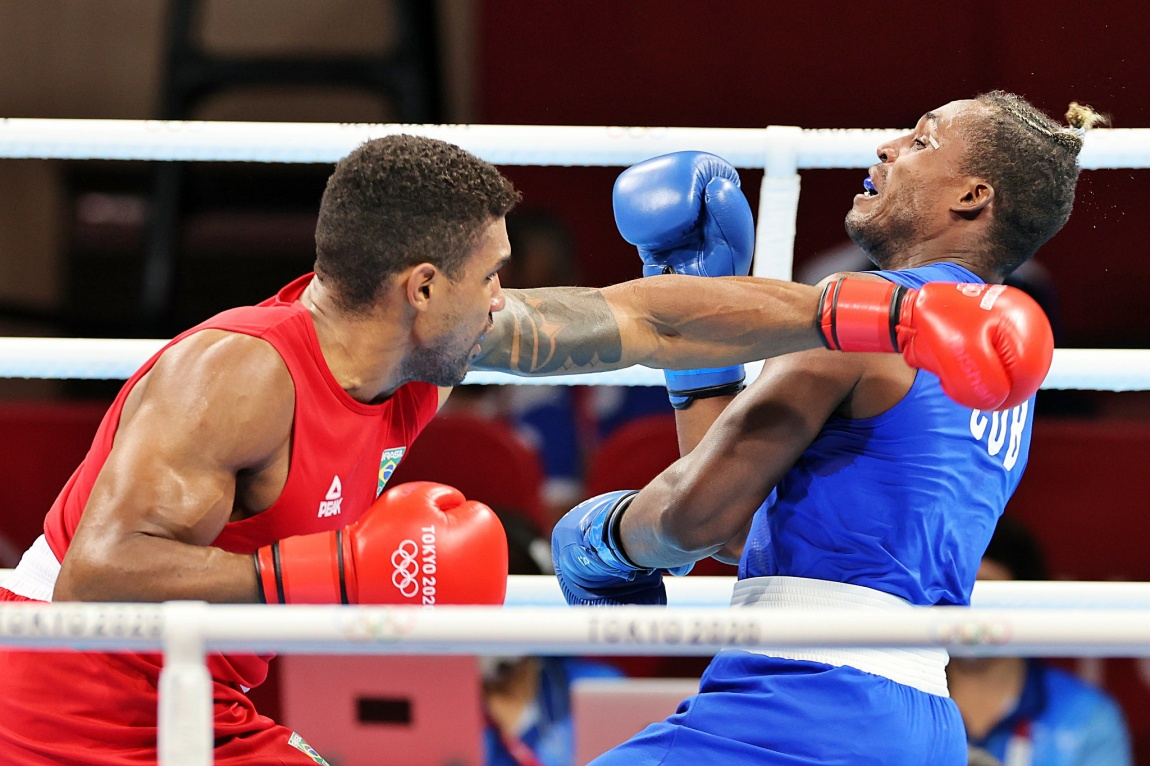
- Teixeira (red) against Julio César La Cruz (blue) in 2021

Personal information
- Full name: Abner Teixeira da Silva Júnior
- Born: 10 September 1996 (age 29) Osasco, São Paulo, Brazil
- Height: 1.93 m (6 ft 4 in)

Boxing career
- Stance: Orthodox

Boxing record
- Total fights: 1
- Wins: 1
- Win by KO: 1
Medal record
Men's amateur boxing
Representing Brazil
Olympic Games
| Bronze medal – third place | 2020 Tokyo | Heavyweight |
Pan American Games
| Silver medal – second place | 2023 Santiago | Super Heavyweight |
| Bronze medal – third place | 2019 Lima | Heavyweight |
South American Games
| Gold medal – first place | 2022 Asunción | Super heavyweight |

Abner Teixeira da Silva Júnior (born 10 September 1996) is a Brazilian professional boxer. He was a bronze medalist in the men's heavyweight event at the 2020 Summer Olympics.

== Amateur career ==
Born in Osasco, Abner soon moved to Sorocaba, in the interior of São Paulo. At the age of 14, Teixeira visited a social boxing project in Sorocaba, and became involved in the sport. Shortly afterwards, the teenager began training. Dedicated, he walked 6 km every day to get to the gym. The boy who dreamed of being a football player, doctor or firefighter soon began to stand out and won his first Brazilian youth title in 2013. The good results led Teixeira to the Brazilian Team. At the 2019 Pan American Games held in Lima, Peru, the heavyweight won the bronze medal.

He participated in the 2019 AIBA World Boxing Championships held in Yekaterinburg, Russia, where he won the first fight but was eliminated in the 2nd round.

At the 2020 Summer Olympics held in Tokyo, he became the first Brazilian boxer to stand on the podium in a historic campaign for Brazil (one gold, one silver and one bronze). The athlete won the fifth Brazilian boxing bronze medal in the history of the Olympic Games: besides him, Servílio de Oliveira (Mexico City 1968) and Adriana Araújo, Yamaguchi Falcão and Esquiva Falcão (London 2012) won the medal.

Participated in the 2021 AIBA World Boxing Championships held in Belgrade, Serbia, in the heavyweight category.

At the 2022 South American Games, he won gold in the super heavyweight category.

At the 2023 IBA World Boxing Championships, now participating in the Super heavyweight category, lost in the round of 16 to Georgian Nikoloz Begadze.

At the 2023 Pan American Games, Teixeira reached the super heavyweight final, but had to abandon the final due to physical injury, obtaining the silver medal and, therefore, qualifying for the 2024 Summer Olympics in Paris. Teixera had a total anterior cruciate ligament (ACL) injury in his right knee two months ago. At the moment, he was undergoing conservative treatment, as surgery could take him out of the Olympics, as it was estimated that recovery would take around seven months. He managed to recover to compete in the Olympics, but fell in the first round.

== Professional career ==
On 22 February 2025, it was announced that Teixera had signed with English influencer KSI's Misfits Boxing under their MF Pro division.

Teixeira was scheduled to make his professional debut on 4 April 2026 on the Derek Chisora vs. Deontay Wilder undercard at The O2 Arena in London, England. Teixsira's manager Sal Jobe stated that his application was rejected by the British Boxing Board of Control (BBBofC) on the biases that he cannot make his professional debut overseas. However, the BBBofC deny the blockage. Teixeira was rescheduled to make his debut against Raiuga Eugenio De Souza (2–4) at the Conjunto Nacional in Brasília, Brazil on the same day, 4 April, to which he won via technical knockout.

== Professional boxing record ==
| 1 fight | 1 win | 0 losses |
|---|---|---|
| By knockout | 1 | 0 |

| No. | Result | Record | Opponent | Type | Round, time | Date | Location | Notes |
|---|---|---|---|---|---|---|---|---|
| 1 | Win | 1–0 | Raiuga Eugenio De Souza | TKO | 3 (4), 2:53 | 4 Apr 2026 | Conjunto Nacional, Brasília, Brazil | |
