= Fernando Arzola =

Cuban boxer

Personal information
- Nationality: Cuba

Boxing career
Medal record
Men's amateur boxing
Representing Cuba
IBA World Championships
Silver medal – second place	2023 Tashkent	Super heavyweight
Pan American Games
Bronze medal – third place	2023 Santiago	+92 kg
Central American and Caribbean Games
Bronze medal – third place	2026 Santo Domingo	Super Heavyweight

Fernando Arzola is a Cuban boxer. He competed at the 2023 IBA World Boxing Championships, winning the silver medal in the super heavyweight event. He also competed at the 2023 Pan American Games, winning the bronze medal in the men's +92 kg event.
