= Yousry Hafez =

Egyptian boxer (born 1993)

Personal information
- Nationality: Egyptian
- Born: Yousry Rezk Mostafa Hafez; 30 August 1993 (age 32) Alexandria, Egypt
- Height: 6 ft 4 1/2 in (1.94 m)
- Weight: Super-heavyweight

Boxing career
Medal record
Men's amateur boxing
Representing Egypt
Mediterranean Games
Gold medal – first place	2018 Tarragona	Super-heavyweight
Gold medal – first place	2022 Oran	Super-heavyweight
African Games
Gold medal – first place	2019 Rabat	Super-heavyweight
African Championships
Gold medal – first place	2022 Maputo	Super-heavyweight
Bronze medal – third place	2017 Brazzaville	Super-heavyweight

Yousry Hafez (born 30 August 1993) is an Egyptian amateur boxer who competed at the 2017 and 2019 World Championships. He has also won gold medals at the 2018 Mediterranean Games and 2019 African Games.

== Amateur career ==
His first international medal was at the 2017 African Championships in Brazzaville, where he lost in the semi-finals to eventual gold medalist Arsène Fokou and took home a bronze medal. He then competed in that year's World Championships in Hamburg, losing in his first bout against Joseph Goodall. He won a gold medal at the 2018 Mediterranean Games, winning every fight by unanimous decision (UD) and beating Mohamed Firisse of Tunisia in the final, and soon achieved another gold medal at the 2019 African Games. The latter qualified him for the 2019 World Championships in Yekaterinburg, where he managed to win his first fight against Brazilian representative Joel da Silva. In the 2020 African Olympic Qualification Tournament, he was the number one seed in the super-heavyweight bracket, but was eliminated in the first round by Maxime Njieyo Yegnong by split decision.

=== Amateur results ===
- 2015 National Championships in Egypt (super-heavyweight)
  - Lost to Issa Ahmed Madian Kassem 0–3 (silver)
- 2016 African Olympic Qualification Tournament in Yaoundé, Cameroon (super-heavyweight)
  - Defeated Fred Ramogi (Kenya) 3–0
  - Lost to Aymen Trabelsi (Tunisia) 0–3
- 2016 National Championships in Egypt (super-heavyweight) (gold)
- 2017 Islamic Solidarity Games in Baku, Azerbaijan (super-heavyweight)
  - Lost to Magomedrasul Medzhidov (Azerbaijan) AB2
- 2017 African Championships in Brazzaville, Republic of the Congo (super-heavyweight)
  - Defeated Hamza Beguerni (Algeria) 4–1
  - Defeated Keddy Agnes (Seychelles) 5–0
  - Lost to Arsène Fokou (Cameroon) AB2 (bronze)
- 2017 World Championships in Hamburg, Germany (super-heavyweight)
  - Lost to Joseph Goodall (Australia) 0–5
- 2018 Mediterranean Games in Tarragona, Spain (super-heavyweight)
  - Defeated Dašo Simeunović (Bosnia and Herzegovina) 5–0
  - Defeated Eren Uzun (Turkey) 5–0
  - Defeated Djamili-Dine Aboudou (France) 5–0
  - Defeated Mohamed Firisse (Morocco) 5–0 (gold)
- 2019 African Games in Rabat, Morocco (super-heavyweight)
  - Defeated Chouaib Bouloudinat (Algeria) 4–1
  - Defeated Solomon Imoleayo Adebayo (Nigeria) 5–0
  - Defeated Jeamie Tshikeva (Democratic Republic of the Congo) 4–1 (gold)
- 2019 World Championships in Yekaterinburg, Russia (super-heavyweight)
  - Defeated Joel da Silva (Brazil) 5–0
  - Lost to Mahammad Abdullayev (Azerbaijan) 2–3
- 2019 National Championships in Asyut, Egypt (super-heavyweight) (gold)
- 2019 Military World Games in Wuhan, China (super-heavyweight)
  - Defeated Vladan Babić (Serbia) 5–0
  - Lost to Haipeng Mou (China) 1–4
- 2020 African Olympic Qualification Tournament in Diamniadio, Senegal (super-heavyweight)
  - Lost to Maxime Njieyo Yegnong (Cameroon) 2–3
