= Nigel Paul (boxer) =

Trinidad and Tobago boxer (born 1989)

Personal information
- Born: 27 June 1989 (age 37) Chaguanas, Trinidad and Tobago

Sport
- Country: Trinidad and Tobago
- Sport: Boxing
Medal record
Men's amateur boxing
Representing Trinidad and Tobago
World Championships
Bronze medal – third place	2021 Belgrade	Super heavyweight
Pan American Boxing Championship
Bronze medal – third place	Tegucigalpa 2017	Super heavyweight
Central American and Caribbean Games
Bronze medal – third place	2018 Barranquilla	Super heavyweight

Nigel Paul (born 27 June 1989) is a super heavyweight boxer from Trinidad and Tobago.

== Biography ==
In 2015 he won the Trinidad & Tobago National Novice Championships and became seventh at the AMBC American Confederation Boxing Championships.

In 2016 he became second at the American Qualification Event for the 2016 Olympic Summer Games and qualified for the Olympic boxing tournament. Paul was beaten by Nigerian boxer Efe Ajagba at the Olympic boxing tournament on 13 August at the Rio games. Ajagba won the bout with a 7 second knockout of Paul.

In 2021 he competed at the World Championships, where he became the first boxer from his country, and the Caribbean, to win a world medal (bronze).
