= Cristian Salcedo =

Colombian boxer (born 1992)

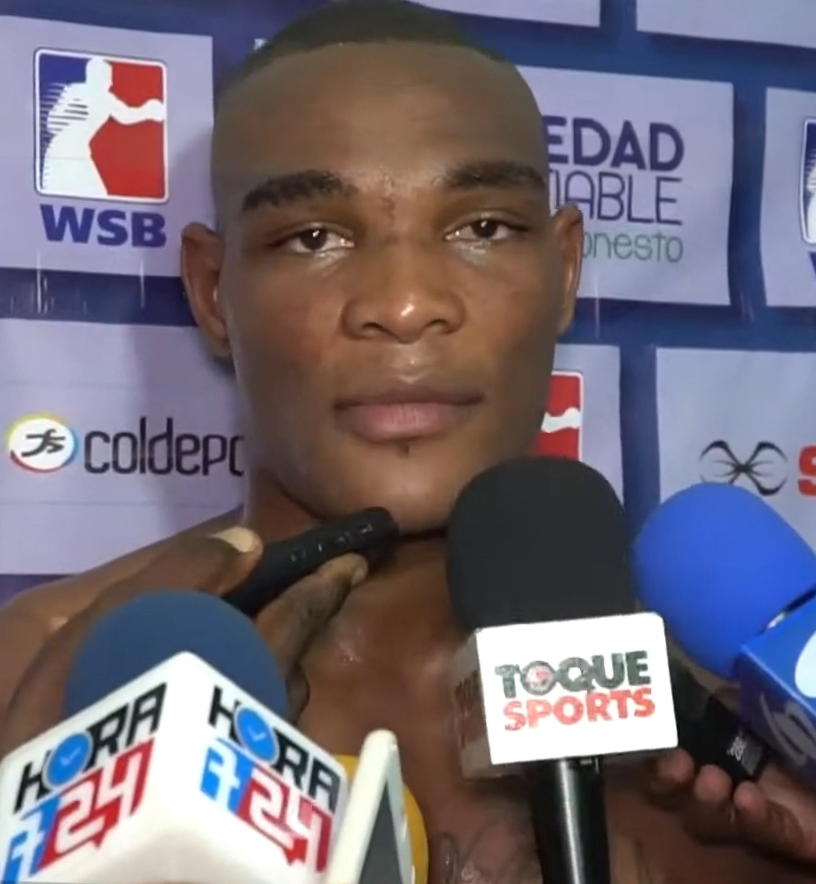
- Salcedo in 2018

Personal information
- Full name: Cristian Camilo Salcedo Codazzi
- Nationality: Colombia
- Born: 27 July 1992 (age 34) Tunja, Colombia
- Height: 1.90 m (6 ft 3 in)
- Weight: 102 kg (225 lb)

Sport
- Sport: Boxing
- Weight class: Super heavyweight
Medal record
Representing Colombia
Men's amateur boxing
| Event | 1st | 2nd | 3rd |
|---|---|---|---|
| Pan American Games | 0 | 1 | 1 |
| Pan American Championships | 0 | 1 | 0 |
| CAC Games | 0 | 1 | 0 |
| South American Games | 1 | 0 | 1 |
| Bolivarian Games | 2 | 0 | 0 |
| Total | 3 | 3 | 2 |
Pan American Games
| Silver medal – second place | 2019 Lima | Super heavyweight |
| Bronze medal – third place | 2023 Santiago | Super heavyweight |
Pan American Championships
| Silver medal – second place | 2017 Tegucigalpa | Super heavyweight |
Central American and Caribbean Games
| Silver medal – second place | 2023 San Salvador | Super heavyweight |
South American Games
| Gold medal – first place | 2018 Cochabamba | Super heavyweight |
| Bronze medal – third place | 2022 Asunción | Super heavyweight |
Bolivarian Games
| Gold medal – first place | 2017 Santa Marta | Super heavyweight |
| Gold medal – first place | 2022 Valledupar | Super heavyweight |

Cristian Camilo Salcedo Codazi (born 27 July 1992) is a Colombian boxer. He competed in the men's super heavyweight event at the 2020 Summer Olympics.
