= Ayoub Ghadfa =

Spanish boxer (born 1998)

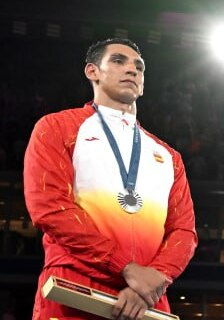
- Ghadfa at the 2024 Summer Olympics

Personal information
- Nationality: Spanish
- Born: Ayoub Ghadfa Drissi El Aissaoui; 6 December 1998 (age 27) Marbella, Spain
- Height: 198 cm (6 ft 6 in)

Boxing career
- Weight class: Super heavyweight
- Stance: Orthodox
Medal record
Men's amateur boxing
Representing Spain
Olympic Games
Silver medal – second place	2024 Paris	Super-heavyweight
IBA World Championships
Bronze medal – third place	2023 Tashkent	Super heavyweight
European Championships
Gold medal – first place	2024 Belgrade	Super heavyweight
Silver medal – second place	2022 Yerevan	Super heavyweight
European Union Championships
Bronze medal – third place	2018 Valladolid	Super heavyweight

Ayoub Ghadfa Drissi El Aissaoui (born 6 December 1998) is a Spanish boxer. He competed at the 2022 European Amateur Boxing Championships, winning the bronze medal in the super heavyweight event. He also competed at the 2024 Summer Olympics, winning the silver medal in the men's +92 kg event.
