= Davit Chaloyan =

Armenian boxer (born 1997)

Personal information
- Nationality: Armenia
- Born: 30 September 1997 (age 28) Gyumri, Armenia
- Height: 1.91 m (6 ft 3 in)

Boxing career
Medal record
Men's amateur boxing
Representing Armenia
IBA World Championships
Silver medal – second place	2021 Belgrade	Super heavyweight
Bronze medal – third place	2025 Dubai	Super heavyweight
World Military Boxing Championships
Bronze medal – third place	2021 Moscow	Super heavyweight

Davit Chaloyan (Armenian: Դավիթ Չալոյան; born 30 September 1997 in Gyumri) is an Armenian boxer. He competed at the 2021 AIBA World Boxing Championships, winning the silver medal in the super heavyweight event. He also competed at the 2025 IBA Men's World Boxing Championships, winning the bronze medal in the same event.

He qualified to represent Armenia at the 2024 Summer Olympics.
