= Athletics at the 2020 Summer Olympics =

Athletics at the Games of the XXXII Olympiad
- Venue: Olympic Stadium (track and field events); Odori Park (Sapporo) (marathon and race walk)
- Dates: 30 July – 8 August 2021
- No. of events: 48

Athletics at the 2020 Summer Olympics were held during the last ten days of the Games. They were due to be held from 31 July – 8 August 2020, at the Olympic Stadium in Tokyo, Japan. Due to the COVID-19 pandemic, the games were postponed to 2021, with the track and field events set for 30 July – 8 August. The sport of athletics at these Games was split into three distinct sets of events: track and field events, remaining in Tokyo, and road running events and racewalking events, moved to Sapporo. A total of 48 events were held, one more than in 2016, with the addition of a mixed relay event.

== Olympic stadium and venues ==
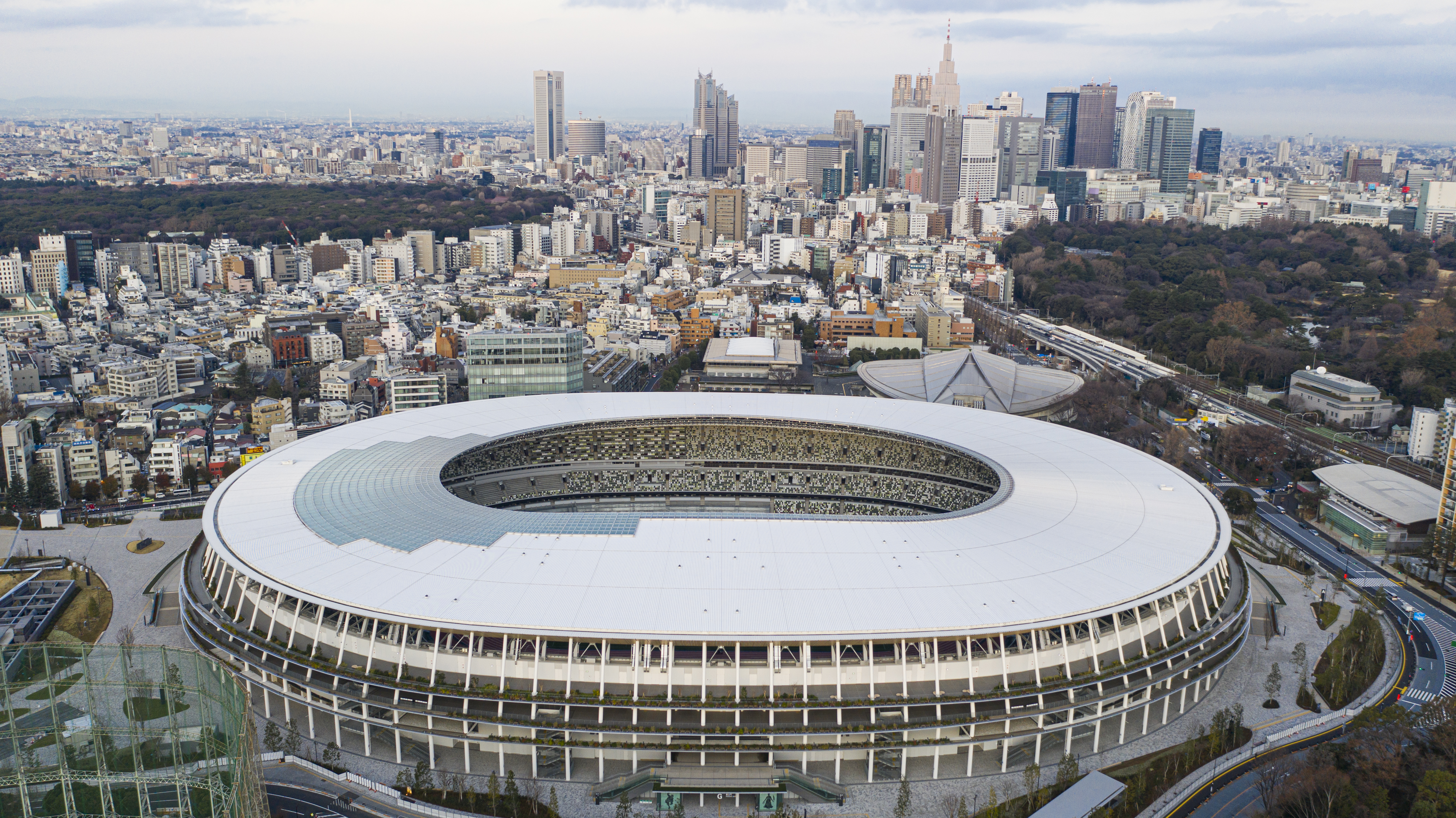
Olympic Stadium

The National Stadium, which was known as the Olympic Stadium during the games, completely rebuilt and inaugurated on 21 December 2019, was the venue of all the track and field events, while road events (marathons and racewalks) took place at Odori Park in Sapporo.

Italian company Mondo equipped the stadium with a new track, a Mondotrack WS surface which was given a seal of approval with a World Athletics "Class 1 certificate" in December 2019. The Mondotrack WS surface in Tokyo's National Stadium is a better and updated version of the track that was provided and installed for the 2016 Summer Olympics in Rio de Janeiro, Brazil.

Due to the risk of a heat wave during the period of the Games, the IOC, Organizing Committee and IAAF decided in October 2019 that the Race Walking and Marathon events would be moved to Sapporo, which hosted the 1972 Winter Olympics. The route started and arrived at Odori Park and is the traditional venue of Hokkaido Marathon until 2012, featuring a large loop which is about the length of a half-marathon (21,095 km), followed by a second smaller loop (10,540 km) which was completed twice.

== Schedule ==
Apart from the race walks and marathon, nine track and field events will hold finals in the morning session to ensure that they receive maximum visibility for the sport across all time zones. On 16 October 2019, the IOC announced that there were plans to re-locate the marathon and racewalking events to Sapporo due to heat concerns. The plans were made official on 1 November 2019 after Tokyo Governor Yuriko Koike accepted the IOC's decision, despite her belief that the events should have remained in Tokyo.

Legend
P	Preliminary round	Q	Qualification	H	Heats	½	Semi-finals	F	Final

Ref
Men's
Date	Jul 30		Jul 31		Aug 1			Aug 2		Aug 3		Aug 4		Aug 5		Aug 6		Aug 7		Aug 8	
Event	M	E	M	E	M	E		M	E	M	E	M	E	M	E	M	E	M	E	M	E
100 m			P	H		½	F														
200 m										H	½		F								
400 m					H				½						F						
800 m			H			½							F								
1500 m										H					½				F		
5000 m											H						F				
10,000 m		F																			
110 m hurdles											H	½		F							
400 m hurdles	H					½				F											
3000 m steeplechase	H								F												
4 × 100 m relay														H			F				
4 × 400 m relay																	H		F		
Marathon																				F	
20 km walk															F						
50 km walk																F					
Long jump				Q				F													
Triple jump										Q				F							
High jump	Q					F															
Pole vault			Q								F										
Shot put											Q			F							
Discus throw	Q			F																	
Javelin throw												Q							F		
Hammer throw								Q					F								
Decathlon												F									
Women's
Date	Jul 30		Jul 31			Aug 1		Aug 2		Aug 3		Aug 4		Aug 5		Aug 6		Aug 7		Aug 8	
Event	M	E	M	E		M	E	M	E	M	E	M	E	M	E	M	E	M	E	M	E
100 m	H			½	F																
200 m								H	½		F										
400 m										H			½				F				
800 m	H			½							F										
1500 m								H					½				F				
5000 m		H							F												
10,000 m																			F		
100 m hurdles			H				½	F													
400 m hurdles			H						½			F									
3000 m steeplechase						H							F								
4 × 100 m relay														H			F				
4 × 400 m relay															H				F		
Marathon																		F			
20 km walk																	F				
Long jump						Q				F											
Triple jump		Q					F														
High jump														Q					F		
Pole vault									Q						F						
Shot put		Q				F															
Discus throw			Q						F												
Javelin throw										Q							F				
Hammer throw						Q					F										
Heptathlon												F									
Mixed
Date	Jul 30		Jul 31																		
Event	M	E	M	E																	
4 × 400 m relay		H		F																	

== Qualification ==
The 2020 athletics qualifying system for individual events was fundamentally different from previous versions. Instead of being only based on set qualifying standards, the new qualifying system is also based on IAAF World Rankings. Qualifying standards provided an alternate pathway, but are to be set high enough that only exceptional performances will meet them. Maximum entries per event were set (unlike previous years where entries were based on how many athletes met the qualifying standard), with the world rankings being used to fill the quota after the standards-based entrants and universality entrants are set.

On 2 June 2021, Sebastian Coe, president of World Athletics, declared that "our tracking suggests that about 70 percent of athletes in most events will qualify by entry standard. This is above the 50 percent rate we aimed for in devising the system, but we believe this is due to the extended qualifying period created after the postponement of the Olympic Games from 2020 to 2021."

For relays, the qualification is somewhat similar to previous years. Eight teams will be selected through the results at the 2019 World Championships in Athletics, then adding the finalists of 2021 World Athletics Relays if different ones and some more selected through top lists' rankings, up to 16 teams by event.

== Record figures ==
3 world records and 12 Olympic records were set. 28 continental (area) records were set along with 151 national ones.

According to the international governing body for the sport of athletics, World Athletics, their performance ranking system concludes that the 2020 Olympic Games were the "highest quality major event in history".

== Medal summary ==
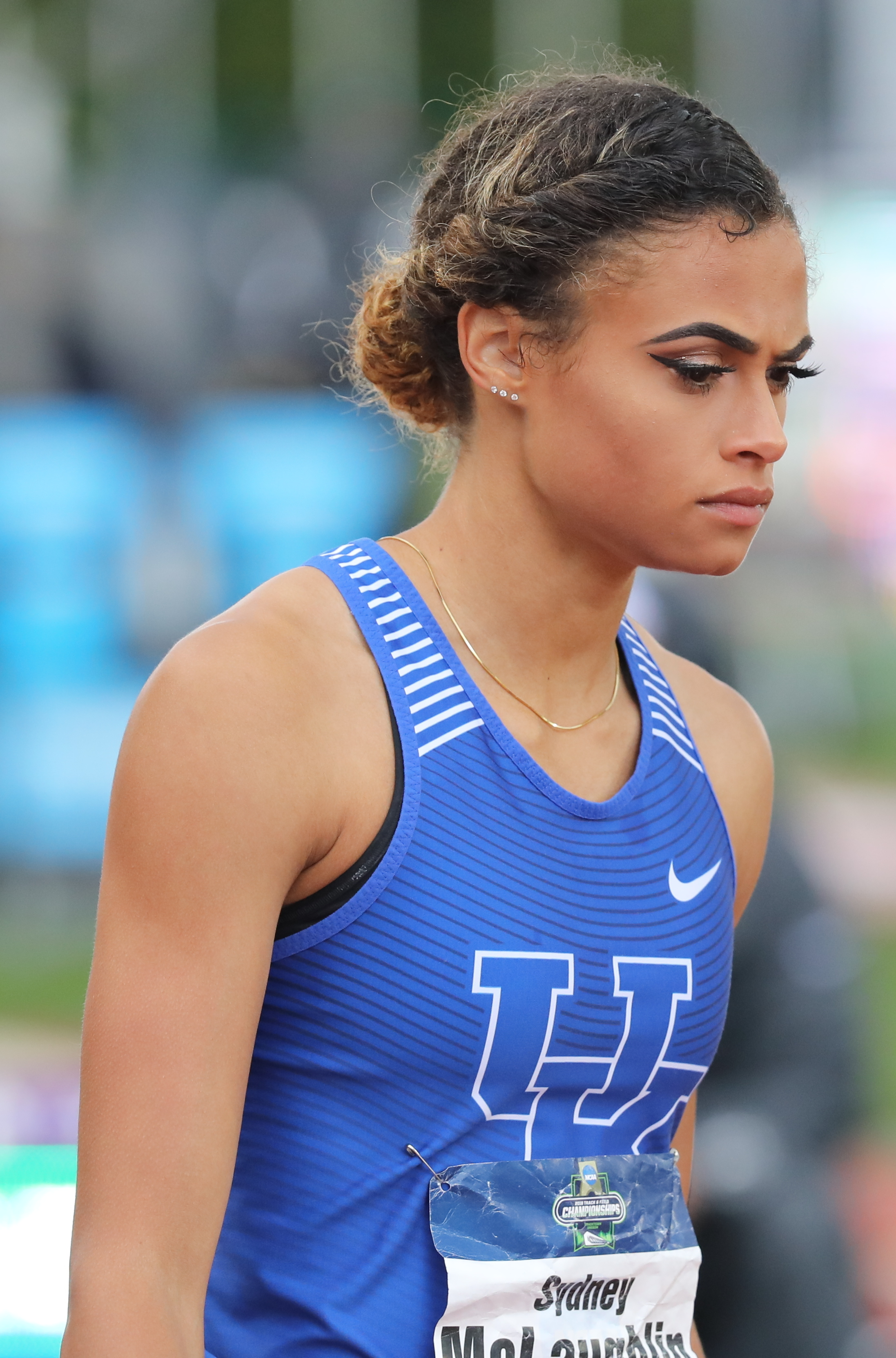
Sydney McLaughlin set a world record in women's 400 m hurdles.

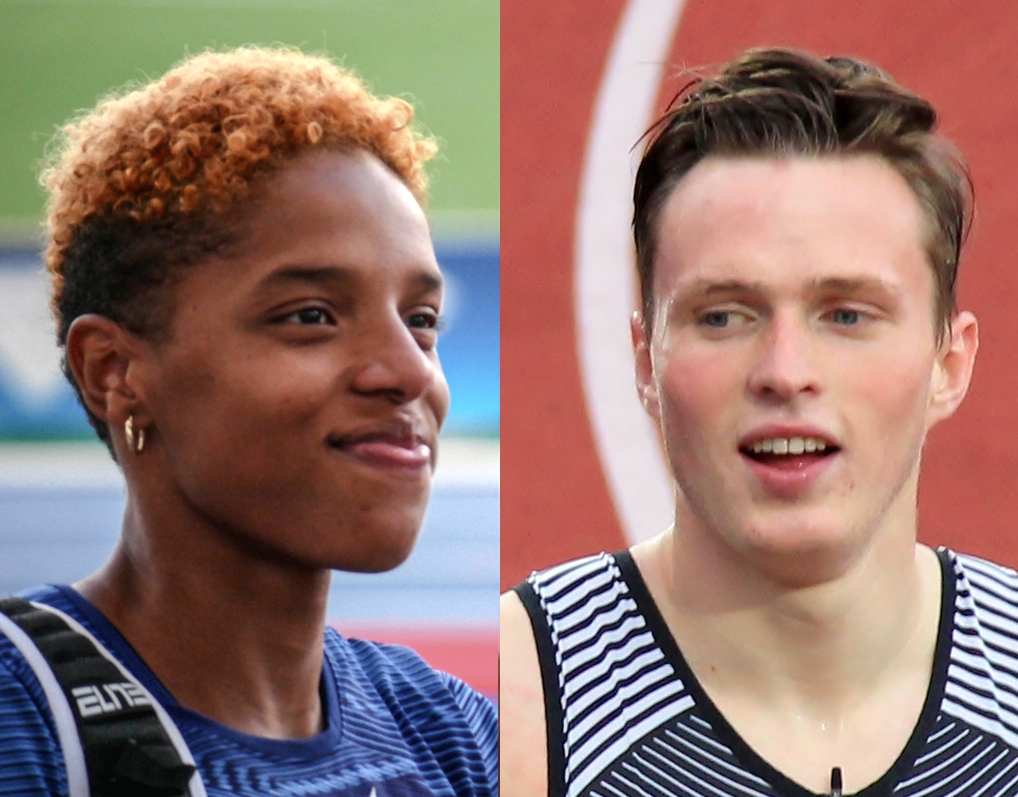
Yulimar Rojas (left) and Karsten Warholm (right) set world records in the women's triple jump and men's 400 m hurdles, respectively.

=== Medal table ===
Key

* Host nation (Japan)

Rank	NOC	Gold	Silver	Bronze	Total
1	United States	7	12	7	26
2	Italy	5	0	0	5
3	Kenya	4	4	2	10
4	Poland	4	2	3	9
5	Jamaica	4	1	4	9
6	Netherlands	2	3	3	8
7	Canada	2	2	2	6
7	China	2	2	2	6
9	Uganda	2	1	1	4
10	Norway	2	1	0	3
10	Sweden	2	1	0	3
12	Bahamas	2	0	0	2
13	Germany	1	2	0	3
14	Ethiopia	1	1	2	4
15	Portugal	1	1	0	2
15	ROC	1	1	0	2
17	Belgium	1	0	1	2
18	Greece	1	0	0	1
18	India	1	0	0	1
18	Morocco	1	0	0	1
18	Puerto Rico	1	0	0	1
18	Qatar	1	0	0	1
18	Venezuela	1	0	0	1
24	Great Britain	0	2	3	5
25	Colombia	0	2	0	2
25	Dominican Republic	0	2	0	2
27	Australia	0	1	2	3
27	Cuba	0	1	2	3
29	Czech Republic	0	1	1	2
29	Japan*	0	1	1	2
31	Bahrain	0	1	0	1
31	France	0	1	0	1
31	Namibia	0	1	0	1
34	Brazil	0	0	2	2
34	New Zealand	0	0	2	2
36	Austria	0	0	1	1
36	Belarus	0	0	1	1
36	Botswana	0	0	1	1
36	Burkina Faso	0	0	1	1
36	Grenada	0	0	1	1
36	Nigeria	0	0	1	1
36	Spain	0	0	1	1
36	Ukraine	0	0	1	1
Totals (43 entries)		49	47	48	144

=== Men ===
Event	Gold		Silver		Bronze	
100 metres	Marcell Jacobs; Italy	9.80 AR	Fred Kerley; United States	9.84 PB	Andre De Grasse; Canada	9.89 PB
200 metres	Andre De Grasse; Canada	19.62 NR	Kenny Bednarek; United States	19.68 PB	Noah Lyles; United States	19.74 =SB
400 metres	Steven Gardiner; Bahamas	43.85 SB	Anthony Zambrano; Colombia	44.08	Kirani James; Grenada	44.19
800 metres	Emmanuel Korir; Kenya	1:45.06	Ferguson Rotich; Kenya	1:45.23	Patryk Dobek; Poland	1:45.39
1500 metres	Jakob Ingebrigtsen; Norway	3:28.32 OR, AR	Timothy Cheruiyot; Kenya	3:29.01	Josh Kerr; Great Britain	3:29.05 PB
5000 metres	Joshua Cheptegei; Uganda	12:58.15	Mohammed Ahmed; Canada	12:58.61	Paul Chelimo; United States	12:59.05 SB
10,000 metres	Selemon Barega; Ethiopia	27:43.22	Joshua Cheptegei; Uganda	27:43.63	Jacob Kiplimo; Uganda	27:43.88
110 metres hurdles	Hansle Parchment; Jamaica	13.04 SB	Grant Holloway; United States	13.09	Ronald Levy; Jamaica	13.10
400 metres hurdles	Karsten Warholm; Norway	45.94 WR	Rai Benjamin; United States	46.17 AR	Alison dos Santos; Brazil	46.72 AR
3000 metres steeplechase	Soufiane El Bakkali; Morocco	8:08.90	Lamecha Girma; Ethiopia	8:10.38	Benjamin Kigen; Kenya	8:11.45
4 × 100 metres relay^{[a]}	Italy; Lorenzo Patta; Marcell Jacobs; Fausto Desalu; Filippo Tortu	37.50 NR	Canada; Aaron Brown; Jerome Blake; Brendon Rodney; Andre De Grasse	37.70 SB	China; Tang Xingqiang; Xie Zhenye; Su Bingtian; Wu Zhiqiang	37.79 NR
4 × 400 metres relay	United States; Michael Cherry; Michael Norman; Bryce Deadmon; Rai Benjamin; Vernon Norwood*; Randolph Ross*; Trevor Stewart*	2:55.70 SB	Netherlands; Liemarvin Bonevacia; Terrence Agard; Tony van Diepen; Ramsey Angela; Jochem Dobber*	2:57.18 NR	Botswana; Isaac Makwala; Baboloki Thebe; Zibane Ngozi; Bayapo Ndori	2:57.27 AR
Marathon	Eliud Kipchoge; Kenya	2:08:38	Abdi Nageeye; Netherlands	2:09:58	Bashir Abdi; Belgium	2:10:00
20 kilometres walk	Massimo Stano; Italy	1:21:05	Koki Ikeda; Japan	1:21:14	Toshikazu Yamanishi; Japan	1:21:28
50 kilometres walk	Dawid Tomala; Poland	3:50:08	Jonathan Hilbert; Germany	3:50:44	Evan Dunfee; Canada	3:50:59 SB
High jump	Gianmarco Tamberi; Italy	2.37 m SB	Not awarded		Maksim Nedasekau; Belarus	2.37 m =NR
High jump	Mutaz Essa Barshim; Qatar	2.37 m SB	Not awarded		Maksim Nedasekau; Belarus	2.37 m =NR
Pole vault	Armand Duplantis; Sweden	6.02 m	Chris Nilsen; United States	5.97 m PB	Thiago Braz; Brazil	5.87 m SB
Long jump	Miltiadis Tentoglou; Greece	8.41 m	Juan Miguel Echevarría; Cuba	8.41 m	Maykel Massó; Cuba	8.21 m
Triple jump	Pedro Pichardo; Portugal	17.98 m NR	Zhu Yaming; China	17.57 m PB	Hugues Fabrice Zango; Burkina Faso	17.47 m
Shot put	Ryan Crouser; United States	23.30 m OR	Joe Kovacs; United States	22.65 m	Tom Walsh; New Zealand	22.47 m SB
Discus throw	Daniel Ståhl; Sweden	68.90 m	Simon Pettersson; Sweden	67.39 m	Lukas Weißhaidinger; Austria	67.07 m
Hammer throw	Wojciech Nowicki; Poland	82.52 m PB	Eivind Henriksen; Norway	81.58 m NR	Paweł Fajdek; Poland	81.53 m
Javelin throw	Neeraj Chopra; India	87.58 m	Jakub Vadlejch; Czech Republic	86.67 m SB	Vítězslav Veselý; Czech Republic	85.44 m SB
Decathlon	Damian Warner; Canada	9018 pts OR NR	Kevin Mayer; France	8726 pts SB	Ashley Moloney; Australia	8649 pts AR

* Indicates the athlete only competed in the preliminary heats and received medals.

- ^{Men's 4 × 100} On 18 February 2022 team of Great Britain was disqualified for doping use and officially stripped of the silver medal. The medals were reallocated on 19 May 2022.

=== Women ===
Event	Gold		Silver		Bronze	
100 metres	Elaine Thompson-Herah; Jamaica	10.61 OR	Shelly-Ann Fraser-Pryce; Jamaica	10.74	Shericka Jackson; Jamaica	10.76 PB
200 metres	Elaine Thompson-Herah; Jamaica	21.53 NR	Christine Mboma; Namibia	21.81 WJR	Gabby Thomas; United States	21.87
400 metres	Shaunae Miller-Uibo; Bahamas	48.36 AR	Marileidy Paulino; Dominican Republic	49.20 NR	Allyson Felix; United States	49.46 SB MWR
800 metres	Athing Mu; United States	1:55.21 NR	Keely Hodgkinson; Great Britain	1:55.88 NR	Raevyn Rogers; United States	1:56.81 PB
1500 metres	Faith Kipyegon; Kenya	3:53.11 OR	Laura Muir; Great Britain	3:54.50 NR	Sifan Hassan; Netherlands	3:55.86
5000 metres	Sifan Hassan; Netherlands	14:36.79	Hellen Obiri; Kenya	14:38.36	Gudaf Tsegay; Ethiopia	14:38.87
10,000 metres	Sifan Hassan; Netherlands	29:55.32	Kalkidan Gezahegne; Bahrain	29:56.18	Letesenbet Gidey; Ethiopia	30:01.72
100 metres hurdles	Jasmine Camacho-Quinn; Puerto Rico	12.37	Kendra Harrison; United States	12.52	Megan Tapper; Jamaica	12.55
400 metres hurdles	Sydney McLaughlin; United States	51.46 WR	Dalilah Muhammad; United States	51.58 PB	Femke Bol; Netherlands	52.03 AR
3000 metres steeplechase	Peruth Chemutai; Uganda	9:01.45 NR	Courtney Frerichs; United States	9:04.79 SB	Hyvin Jepkemoi; Kenya	9:05.39
4 × 100 metres relay	Jamaica; Briana Williams; Elaine Thompson-Herah; Shelly-Ann Fraser-Pryce; Shericka Jackson; Natasha Morrison*; Remona Burchell*	41.02 NR	United States; Javianne Oliver; Teahna Daniels; Jenna Prandini; Gabby Thomas; English Gardner*; Aleia Hobbs*	41.45 SB	Great Britain; Asha Philip; Imani Lansiquot; Dina Asher-Smith; Daryll Neita	41.88
4 × 400 metres relay	United States; Sydney McLaughlin; Allyson Felix; Dalilah Muhammad; Athing Mu; Kendall Ellis*; Lynna Irby*; Wadeline Jonathas*; Kaylin Whitney*	3:16.85 SB	Poland; Natalia Kaczmarek; Iga Baumgart-Witan; Małgorzata Hołub-Kowalik; Justyna Święty-Ersetic; Anna Kiełbasińska*	3:20.53 NR	Jamaica; Roneisha McGregor; Janieve Russell; Shericka Jackson; Candice McLeod; Junelle Bromfield*; Stacey-Ann Williams*	3:21.24 SB
Marathon	Peres Jepchirchir; Kenya	2:27:20 SB	Brigid Kosgei; Kenya	2:27:36 SB	Molly Seidel; United States	2:27:46 SB
20 kilometres walk	Antonella Palmisano; Italy	1:29:12	Sandra Arenas; Colombia	1:29:37	Liu Hong; China	1:29:57
High jump	Mariya Lasitskene; ROC	2.04 m SB	Nicola McDermott; Australia	2.02 m AR	Yaroslava Mahuchikh; Ukraine	2.00 m
Pole vault	Katie Nageotte; United States	4.90 m	Anzhelika Sidorova; ROC	4.85 m	Holly Bradshaw; Great Britain	4.85 m
Long jump	Malaika Mihambo; Germany	7.00 m SB	Brittney Reese; United States	6.97 m	Ese Brume; Nigeria	6.97 m
Triple jump	Yulimar Rojas; Venezuela	15.67 m WR	Patrícia Mamona; Portugal	15.01 m NR	Ana Peleteiro; Spain	14.87 m NR
Shot put	Gong Lijiao; China	20.58 m PB	Raven Saunders; United States	19.79 m	Valerie Adams; New Zealand	19.62 m
Discus throw	Valarie Allman; United States	68.98 m	Kristin Pudenz; Germany	66.86 m PB	Yaime Pérez; Cuba	65.72 m
Hammer throw	Anita Włodarczyk; Poland	78.48 m SB MWR	Wang Zheng; China	77.03 SB	Malwina Kopron; Poland	75.49 m SB
Javelin throw	Liu Shiying; China	66.34 m SB	Maria Andrejczyk; Poland	64.61 m	Kelsey-Lee Barber; Australia	64.56 m SB
Heptathlon	Nafissatou Thiam; Belgium	6791 pts SB	Anouk Vetter; Netherlands	6689 pts NR	Emma Oosterwegel; Netherlands	6590 pts PB

* Indicates the athlete only competed in the preliminary heats and received medals.

=== Mixed ===
Event	Gold		Silver		Bronze	
4 × 400 metres relay	Poland; Kajetan Duszyński; Natalia Kaczmarek; Justyna Święty-Ersetic; Karol Zalewski; Dariusz Kowaluk*; Iga Baumgart-Witan*; Małgorzata Hołub-Kowalik*	3:09.87 OR, AR	Dominican Republic; Lidio Andrés Feliz; Anabel Medina; Alexander Ogando; Marileidy Paulino; Luguelín Santos*	3:10.21 NR	United States; Kendall Ellis; Vernon Norwood; Trevor Stewart; Kaylin Whitney; Elija Godwin*; Lynna Irby*; Taylor Manson*; Bryce Deadmon*	3:10.22

* Indicates the athlete only competed in the preliminary heats and received medals.

=== Placing table ===
The Placing table assigns points to the top eight athletes in the final, with eight points to first place, seven to second place, and so on until one point for eighth place. Teams or athletes that did not finish or were disqualified do not receive points.

Rank	Team	1st place, gold medalist(s)	2nd place, silver medalist(s)	3rd place, bronze medalist(s)	4	5	6	7	8	Pts
1	United States	7	12	7	6	5	5	7	3	264
2	Jamaica	4	1	4	4	2	2	3	3	106
3	Kenya	4	4	2	5	0	1	2	0	104
4	Poland	4	2	3	0	1	1	1	1	74
5	Canada	2	2	2	1	3	3	1	1	70
6	China	2	2	2	0	3	2	3	3	69
7	Netherlands	2	3	3	1	1	1	0	1	68
8	Ethiopia	1	1	2	5	1	2	0	2	64
9	Great Britain & N.I.	0	2	3	1	1	3	3	2	58
10	Australia	0	1	2	2	2	3	2	2	52
11	Germany	1	2	0	1	3	2	1	3	50
12	Italy	5	0	0	0	1	0	2	2	50
13	Spain	0	0	1	4	3	2	0	1	45
14	Uganda	2	1	1	0	1	0	1	0	35
15	Ukraine	0	0	1	2	3	1	0	1	31
16	Belgium	1	0	1	2	1	0	1	0	30
17	Portugal	1	1	0	1	2	0	0	0	28
18	Japan	0	1	1	0	0	3	2	2	28
18	Sweden	2	1	0	0	0	0	2	0	27
19	France	0	1	0	1	2	0	2	2	26
21	Cuba	0	1	2	0	1	0	0	2	24
22	Norway	2	1	0	0	0	0	0	0	23
23	Bahamas	2	0	0	0	0	1	0	1	20
24	Russia	1	1	0	0	0	1	0	2	20
25	Greece	1	0	0	2	0	0	0	2	19
26	Brazil	0	0	2	1	0	0	0	0	17
27	Colombia	0	2	0	0	0	0	1	0	16
28	New Zealand	0	0	2	0	0	1	0	0	15
29	Dominican Republic	0	2	0	0	0	0	0	0	14
30	Switzerland	0	0	0	1	1	1	1	0	14
31	Belarus	0	0	1	0	1	1	0	1	13
32	Czech Republic	0	1	1	0	0	0	0	0	13
33	Bahrain	0	1	0	0	0	1	1	0	12
34	Turkey	0	0	0	1	0	2	0	1	12
35	Qatar	1	0	0	0	1	0	0	0	12
36	India	1	0	0	0	0	1	0	0	11
37	Nigeria	0	0	1	1	0	0	0	0	11
38	Namibia	0	1	0	0	0	1	0	0	10
39	Slovenia	0	0	0	0	2	1	0	0	10
40	Botswana	0	0	1	0	0	0	1	1	9
41	Ivory Coast	0	0	0	1	1	0	0	0	9
42	Venezuela	1	0	0	0	0	0	0	1	8
43	Morocco	1	0	0	0	0	0	0	0	8
43	Puerto Rico	1	0	0	0	0	0	0	0	8
45	Grenada	0	0	1	0	0	0	1	0	8
46	South Africa	0	0	0	1	0	1	0	0	8
47	Austria	0	0	1	0	0	0	0	1	7
48	Serbia	0	0	0	1	0	0	1	0	7
49	Burkina Faso	0	0	1	0	0	0	0	0	6
50	Croatia	0	0	0	1	0	0	0	0	5
50	British Virgin Islands	0	0	0	1	0	0	0	0	5
50	South Korea	0	0	0	1	0	0	0	0	5
53	Finland	0	0	0	0	1	0	0	2	5
54	Lithuania	0	0	0	0	0	1	1	0	5
55	Algeria	0	0	0	0	1	0	0	0	4
55	Burundi	0	0	0	0	1	0	0	0	4
55	Eritrea	0	0	0	0	1	0	0	0	4
55	Liberia	0	0	0	0	1	0	0	0	4
55	Mexico	0	0	0	0	1	0	0	0	4
55	Pakistan	0	0	0	0	1	0	0	0	4
61	Bosnia and Herzegovina	0	0	0	0	0	1	0	0	3
61	Israel	0	0	0	0	0	1	0	0	3
61	Romania	0	0	0	0	0	1	0	0	3
64	Uzbekistan	0	0	0	0	0	1	0	0	2
65	Estonia	0	0	0	0	0	0	1	0	2
65	Moldova	0	0	0	0	0	0	1	0	2
65	Panama	0	0	0	0	0	0	1	0	2
68	Tanzania	0	0	0	0	0	0	1	0	2
69	Trinidad and Tobago	0	0	0	0	0	0	0	2	2
70	Egypt	0	0	0	0	0	0	0	1	1
70	Ireland	0	0	0	0	0	0	0	1	1

== See also ==
- Athletics at the 2018 Asian Games
- Athletics at the 2018 Commonwealth Games
- Athletics at the 2018 Summer Youth Olympics
- Athletics at the 2019 African Games
- Athletics at the 2019 European Games
- Athletics at the 2019 Pacific Games
- Athletics at the 2019 Pan American Games
- Athletics at the 2020 Summer Paralympics
