= 2021 World Athletics Relays – Men's 4 × 400 metres relay =

Men's 4 × 400 metres relay at the 2021 World Athletics Relays
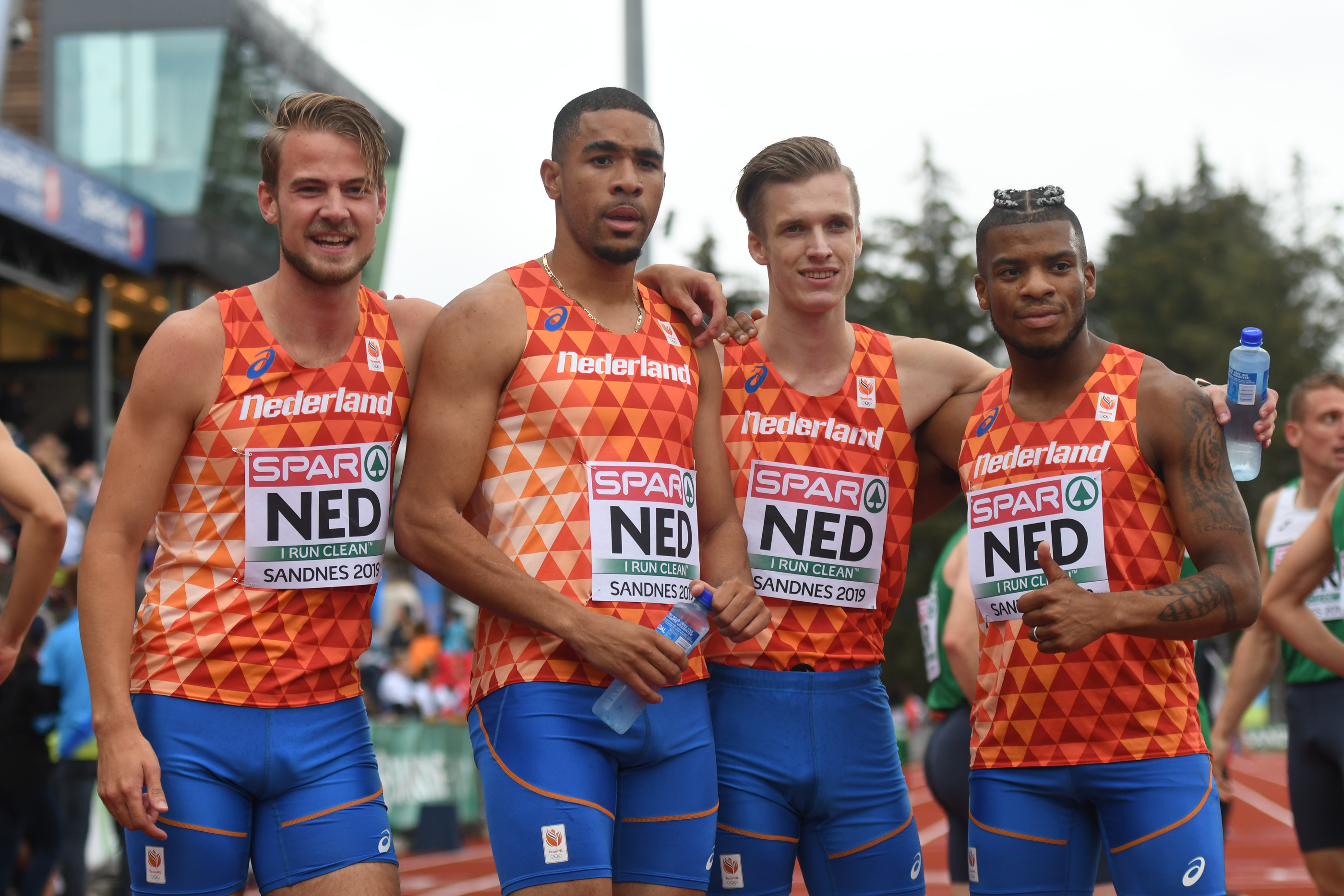
- From the left: Dobber, Agard, Van Diepen and Angela, three of the Dutch components of the winning team, the fourth Agard in this event was replaced by Bonevacia.
- Venue: Silesian Stadium
- Dates: 1 May (heats) & 2 May (final)
- Nations: 15
- Winning time: 3:03.45

Medalists
gold medal	Jochem Dobber; Liemarvin Bonevacia; Ramsey Angela; Tony van Diepen	Netherlands
silver medal	Rikuya Ito; Kaito Kawabata; Kentaro Sato; Aoto Suzuki	Japan
bronze medal	Isaac Makwala; Boitumelo Masilo; Ditiro Nzamani; Leungo Scotch	Botswana

The men's 4 × 400 metres relay at the 2021 World Athletics Relays was held at Silesian Stadium on 1 and 2 May.

== Records ==
Prior to the competition, the records were as follows:

World record	United States (Andrew Valmon, Quincy Watts, Harry Reynolds, Michael Johnson)	2:54.29	Stuttgart, Germany	22 August 1993
Championship record	United States (David Verburg, Tony McQuay, Christian Taylor, LaShawn Merritt	2:57.25	(The Bahamas) Nassau, Bahamas	25 May 2014
World Leading	North Carolina A&T (Daniel Stokes, Randolph Ross, Elijah Young, Trevor Stewart)	3:00.23	Austin, United States	27 March 2021

== Results ==
=== Heats ===
Qualification: First 2 of each heat (Q) plus the 2 fastest times (q) advanced to the final.

- Q Qualified
- q Qualified as fastest times
- WL = World leading
- NR = National record
- SB = Seasonal best
- OG* = 2020 Olympic Games qualification
- WC* = 2022 World Championships qualification

Rank	Heat	Nation	Athletes	Time	Notes
1	2	Netherlands	Jochem Dobber, Liemarvin Bonevacia, Ramsey Angela, Tony van Diepen	3:03.03	Q, SB, OG*, WC*
2	1	Japan	Rikuya Ito, Kentaro Sato, Kazuma Higuchi, Kaito Kawabata	3:03.31	Q, SB, OG*, WC*
3	2	South Africa	Lythe Pillay, Zakhiti Nene, Oscar Mavundla, Ranti Marvin Dikgale	3:03.79	Q, SB, OG*, WC*
4	2	Belgium	Dylan Borlée, Robin Vanderbemden, Jonathan Sacoor, Kevin Borlée	3:04.01	q, SB, WC*
5	3	Botswana	Isaac Makwala, Leungo Scotch, Boitumelo Masilo, Ditiro Nzamani	3:04.03	Q, SB, OG*, WC*
6	1	Colombia	Jhon Perlaza, Yilmar Herrera, Jhon Solís, Anthony Zambrano	3:04.64	Q, SB, WC*
7	1	France	Mamadou Kassé Hann, Loïc Prévot, Nicolas Courbière, Thomas Jordier	3:04.78	q, SB, WC*
8	3	Italy	Lorenzo Benati, Alessandro Sibilio, Brayan Lopez, Vladimir Aceti	3:04.81	Q, SB, WC*
9	3	Poland	Kajetan Duszyński, Dariusz Kowaluk, Wiktor Suwara, Karol Zalewski	3:05.04	SB, WC*
10	1	Czech Republic	Michal Desenský, Pavel Maslák, Martin Tuček, Patrik Šorm	3:05.11	SB, WC*
11	3	Germany	Tobias Lange, Marvin Schlegel, Torben Junker, Manuel Sanders	3:05.83	SB
12	2	Turkey	Oğuzhan Kaya, Yavuz Can, Berke Akçam, İlyas Çanakçı	3:06.05	SB
13	2	Spain	Óscar Husillos, Lucas Búa, Manuel Guijarro, Samuel García	3:06.09	SB
14	3	Great Britain	Joseph Brier, James Williams, Kevin Metzger, Dwayne Cowan	3:10.63	
15	1	Kenya	Stanley Kieti Mutunga, William Rayian, David Sanayek Kapirante, Kevin Kiprotich Tonui	3:10.81	SB

=== Final ===
The Netherlands confirms the first place obtained in the heats summary.

Rank	Nation	Athletes	Time	Notes
1st place, gold medalist(s)	Netherlands	Jochem Dobber, Liemarvin Bonevacia, Ramsey Angela, Tony van Diepen	3:03.45	
2nd place, silver medalist(s)	Japan	Rikuya Ito, Kaito Kawabata, Kentaro Sato, Aoto Suzuki	3:04.45	
3rd place, bronze medalist(s)	Botswana	Isaac Makwala, Boitumelo Masilo, Ditiro Nzamani, Leungo Scotch	3:04.77	
4	Italy	Lorenzo Benati, Alessandro Sibilio, Brayan Lopez, Vladimir Aceti	3:05.11	
5	South Africa	Lythe Pillay, Zakhiti Nene, Ranti Marvin Dikgale, Oscar Mavundla	3:05.76	
6	Colombia	Jhon Perlaza, Yilmar Herrera, Jhon Solís, Anthony Zambrano	3:05.91	
7	France	Victor Coroller, Gilles Biron, Ludovic Ouceni, Muhammad Kounta	3:06.16	
8	Belgium	Jonathan Sacoor, Robin Vanderbemden, Dylan Borlée, Kevin Borlée	3:10.74	
