= Jamaica at the 2020 Summer Olympics =

- IOC code: JAM
- NOC: Jamaica Olympic Association
- Website: www.joa.org.jm

in Tokyo, Japan July 23, 2021 – August 8, 2021
- Competitors: 48 in 6 sports
- Flag bearers (opening): Shelly-Ann Fraser-Pryce; Ricardo Brown
- Flag bearer (closing): Stephanie Ann McPherson
- Medals Ranked 21st: Gold 4 Silver 1 Bronze 4 Total 9

Summer Olympics appearances (overview)
- 1948; 1952; 1956; 1960; 1964; 1968; 1972; 1976; 1980; 1984; 1988; 1992; 1996; 2000; 2004; 2008; 2012; 2016; 2020; 2024

Other related appearances
- British West Indies (1960 S)

Jamaica competed at the 2020 Summer Olympics in Tokyo. Originally scheduled to take place from 24 July to 9 August 2020, the Games were postponed to 23 July to 8 August 2021, because of the COVID-19 pandemic. The country's participation marked its seventeenth Summer Olympic appearance as an independent state, although it has previously competed in four other editions as a British colony, and as part of the West Indies Federation.

== Medalists ==
Medal	Name	Sport	Event	Date
Gold	Elaine Thompson-Herah	Athletics	Women's 100 metres	31 July
Gold	Elaine Thompson-Herah	Athletics	Women's 200 metres	3 August
Gold	Hansle Parchment	Athletics	Men's 110 metres hurdles	5 August
Gold	Remona Burchell; Shelly-Ann Fraser-Pryce; Shericka Jackson; Natasha Morrison; Elaine Thompson-Herah; Briana Williams	Athletics	Women's 4 × 100 metres relay	6 August
Silver	Shelly-Ann Fraser-Pryce	Athletics	Women's 100 metres	31 July
Bronze	Shericka Jackson	Athletics	Women's 100 metres	31 July
Bronze	Megan Tapper	Athletics	Women's 100 metres hurdles	2 August
Bronze	Ronald Levy	Athletics	Men's 110 metres hurdles	5 August
Bronze	Junelle Bromfield; Shericka Jackson; Roneisha McGregor; Janieve Russell; Stacey-Ann Williams	Athletics	Women's 4 × 400 metres relay	7 August

== Competitors ==
The following is the list of number of competitors participating in the Games:

Sport	Men	Women	Total
Athletics	20	22	42
Boxing	1	0	1
Diving	1	0	1
Gymnastics	0	1	1
Judo	0	1	1
Swimming	1	1	2
Total	23	25	48

== Athletics ==
Jamaican athletes further achieved the entry standards, either by qualifying time or by world ranking, in the following track and field events (up to a maximum of 3 athletes in each event):

Key

- Note–Ranks given for track events are within the athlete's heat only
- Q = Qualified for the next round
- q = Qualified for the next round as a fastest loser or, in field events, by position without achieving the qualifying target
- NR = National record
- OR - Olympic record
- N/A = Round not applicable for the event
- Bye = Athlete not required to compete in round

Track & road events
Men

Athlete	Event	Heat		Quarterfinal		Semifinal		Final	
Athlete	Event	Time	Rank	Time	Rank	Time	Rank	Time	Rank
Yohan Blake	100 m	Bye		10.06	2 Q	10.14	6	Did not advance	
Oblique Seville	100 m	Bye		10.04	2 Q	10.09	4	Did not advance	
Tyquendo Tracey	100 m	Bye		DNS		Did not advance			
Yohan Blake	200 m	DNS		—N/a		Did not advance			
Rasheed Dwyer	200 m	20.31	1 Q	—N/a		20.13	2 Q	20.21	7
Julian Forte	200 m	20.65	6	—N/a		Did not advance			
Nathon Allen	400 m	46.12	4	—N/a		Did not advance			
Demish Gaye	400 m	45.49	4 q	—N/a		45.09	4	Did not advance	
Christopher Taylor	400 m	45.20	3 Q	—N/a		44.92	2 Q	44.79 PB	6
Ronald Levy	110 m hurdles	13.17	1 Q	—N/a		13.23	1 Q	13.10	3rd place, bronze medalist(s)
Hansle Parchment	110 m hurdles	13.23	2 Q	—N/a		13.23	2 Q	13.04	1st place, gold medalist(s)
Damion Thomas	110 m hurdles	13.54	3 Q	—N/a		12.39	3	Did not advance	
Jaheel Hyde	400 m hurdles	48.54	1 Q	—N/a		127.38	8	Did not advance	
Kemar Mowatt	400 m hurdles	49.06	4 Q	—N/a		48.95	5	Did not advance	
Shawn Rowe	400 m hurdles	49.18	3 Q	—N/a		48.83	6	Did not advance	
Yohan Blake; Julian Forte; Jevaughn Minzie; Oblique Seville	4 × 100 m relay	37:82	1 Q	—N/a				37.84	5
Nathon Allen; Karayme Bartley*; Demish Gaye; Jaheel Hyde; Christopher Taylor	4 × 400 m relay	2:59.29 SB	2 Q	—N/a				2:58.76 SB	6

Women

Athlete	Event	Heat		Quarterfinal		Semifinal		Final	
Athlete	Event	Time	Rank	Time	Rank	Time	Rank	Time	Rank
Shelly-Ann Fraser-Pryce	100 m	Bye		10.84	1 Q	10.73	1 Q	10.74	2nd place, silver medalist(s)
Elaine Thompson-Herah	100 m	Bye		10.82	1 Q	10.76	1 Q	10.61 OR	1st place, gold medalist(s)
Shericka Jackson	100 m	Bye		11.07	2 Q	10.79	2 Q	10.76	3rd place, bronze medalist(s)
Shelly-Ann Fraser-Pryce	200 m	22.22	1 Q	—N/a		22.13	1 Q	21.94	4
Elaine Thompson-Herah	200 m	22.86	3 Q	—N/a		21.66	1 Q	21.53 NR	1st place, gold medalist(s)
Shericka Jackson	200 m	23.26	4	—N/a		Did not advance			
Roneisha McGregor	400 m	51.14	2 Q	—N/a		50.34	3	Did not advance	
Candice McLeod	400 m	51.09	1 Q	—N/a		49.51 PB	2 Q	49.87	5
Stephenie Ann McPherson	400 m	50.89	1 Q	—N/a		49.34 PB	1 Q	49.61	4
Natoya Goule	800 m	1:59.83	1 Q	—N/a		1:59:57	1 Q	1:58.26	8
Aisha Praught-Leer	1500 m	4:15.31	13	—N/a		Did not advance			
Britany Anderson	100 m hurdles	12.67	1 Q	—N/a		12.40 PB	1 Q	13.24	8
Megan Tapper	100 m hurdles	12.53 PB	2 Q	—N/a		12.62	2 Q	12.55	3rd place, bronze medalist(s)
Yanique Thompson	100 m hurdles	12.74	2 Q	—N/a		DNF		Did not advance	
Leah Nugent	400 m hurdles	DSQ		—N/a		Did not advance			
Janieve Russell	400 m hurdles	54.81	2 Q	—N/a		54.10	2 Q	53.08 PB	4
Ronda Whyte	400 m hurdles	DSQ		—N/a		Did not advance			
Remona Burchell*; Shelly-Ann Fraser-Pryce; Shericka Jackson; Natasha Morrison*; Elaine Thompson-Herah; Briana Williams	4 × 100 m relay	42:14	3 Q	—N/a				41.02 NR	1st place, gold medalist(s)
Junelle Bromfield; Shericka Jackson; Roneisha McGregor; Janieve Russell; Stacey-Ann Williams	4 × 400 m relay	3:21.45	2 Q	—N/a				3:21.24	3rd place, bronze medalist(s)

Mixed

Athlete	Event	Heat		Final	
Athlete	Event	Time	Rank	Time	Rank
Sean Bailey; Karayme Bartley; Junelle Bromfield*; Tovea Jenkins; Stacey-Ann Williams	4 × 400 m relay	3:11.76	3 Q	3:14.95	7

Field events
Men

Athlete	Event	Qualification		Final	
Athlete	Event	Distance	Position	Distance	Position
Tajay Gayle	Long jump	8.14	4 q	7.69	11
Carey McLeod	Long jump	7.75	21	Did not advance	
Carey McLeod	Triple jump	16.01	24	Did not advance	
Fedrick Dacres	Discus throw	62.91	13	Did not advance	
Traves Smikle	Discus throw	59.04	25	Did not advance	
Chad Wright	Discus throw	62.93	12 q	62.56	9

Women

Athlete	Event	Qualification		Final	
Athlete	Event	Distance	Position	Distance	Position
Tissanna Hickling	Long jump	6.22	24	Did not advance	
Chanice Porter	Long jump	6.19	25	Did not advance	
Shanieka Ricketts	Triple jump	14.43	6 Q	14.84	4
Kimberly Williams	Triple jump	14.30	9 q	14.51	8
Lloydricia Cameron	Shot put	17.43	22	Did not advance	
Danniel Thomas-Dodd	Shot put	18.37	13	Did not advance	
Shadae Lawrence	Discus throw	62.27	12 q	62.12	7

== Boxing ==
Jamaica entered one boxer into the Olympic tournament for the first time since 1996. With the cancellation of the 2021 Pan American Qualification Tournament in Buenos Aires, Argentina, Ricardo Brown finished fourth in the men's super heavyweight division to secure a place on the Jamaican team based on the IOC's Boxing Task Force Rankings.

Athlete	Event	Round of 32	Round of 16	Quarterfinals	Semifinals	Final	
Athlete	Event	Opposition Result	Opposition Result	Opposition Result	Opposition Result	Opposition Result	Rank
Ricardo Brown	Men's super heavyweight	Bye	Kumar (IND); L 1–4	Did not advance			

== Diving ==
Jamaica entered one diver into the Olympic competition by finishing in the top eighteen of the men's springboard at the 2021 FINA Diving World Cup in Tokyo, Japan.

Athlete	Event	Preliminary		Semifinal		Final	
Athlete	Event	Points	Rank	Points	Rank	Points	Rank
Yona Knight-Wisdom	Men's 3 m springboard	411.65	13 Q	362.95	15	Did not advance	

== Gymnastics ==
=== Artistic ===
Jamaica entered one artistic gymnast into the Olympic competition. British-born Danusia Francis booked a spot in the women's individual all-around and apparatus events, by finishing ninth out of the twenty gymnasts eligible for qualification at the 2019 World Championships in Stuttgart, Germany.

Two days prior to the competition Francis learned she had torn her anterior cruciate ligament. She therefore withdrew from the balance beam, the vault and the floor exercise. She chose to continue to compete in the uneven bars with her knee bandaged, scoring the lowest of any competitor as the judges deducted 6.5 points for various infractions and gave her only a 0.5 difficulty score. However, her 9.033 execution score was the highest for any athlete on any apparatus.

Women

Athlete	Event	Qualification						Final					
Athlete	Event	Apparatus				Total	Rank	Apparatus				Total	Rank
Athlete	Event	V	UB	BB	F	Total	Rank	V	UB	BB	F	Total	Rank
Danusia Francis	All-around	WD	3.033	WD				Did not advance					

== Judo ==
For the first time in history, Jamaica qualified one judoka for the women's middleweight category (70 kg) at the Games. Ebony Drysdale Daley accepted a continental berth from the Americas as the nation's top-ranked judoka outside of direct qualifying position in the IJF World Ranking List of June 28, 2021.

Athlete	Event	Round of 32	Round of 16	Quarterfinals	Semifinals	Repechage	Final / BM	
Athlete	Event	Opposition Result	Opposition Result	Opposition Result	Opposition Result	Opposition Result	Opposition Result	Rank
Ebony Drysdale Daley	Women's –70 kg	Timo (POR); L 00–10	Did not advance					

== Swimming ==
Jamaican swimmers further achieved qualifying standards in the following events (up to a maximum of 2 swimmers in each event at the Olympic Qualifying Time (OQT), and potentially 1 at the Olympic Selection Time (OST)):

Athlete	Event	Heat		Semifinal		Final	
Athlete	Event	Time	Rank	Time	Rank	Time	Rank
Keanan Dols	Men's 200 m butterfly	2:00.25	34	Did not advance			
Keanan Dols	Men's 200 m individual medley	2:04.29	43	Did not advance			
Alia Atkinson	Women's 100 m breaststroke	1:07.70	22	Did not advance			

== See also ==
- Jamaica at the 2019 Pan American Games
