= Athletics at the 2020 Summer Olympics – Mixed 4 × 400 metres relay =

Mixed 4 × 400 metres relay at the Games of the XXXII Olympiad
- Venue: Japan National Stadium; Tokyo, Japan
- Dates: 30 July 2021 (round 1); 31 July 2021 (final)
- Competitors: 76 from 15 nations
- Winning time: 3:09.87 min OR AR

Medalists
1st place, gold medalist(s)		Karol Zalewski, Natalia Kaczmarek, Justyna Święty-Ersetic, Kajetan Duszyński, Dariusz Kowaluk (Note: This athlete competed in the heats, but was replaced in the final.), Iga Baumgart-Witan, Małgorzata Hołub-Kowalik	Poland
2nd place, silver medalist(s)		Lidio Andrés Feliz, Marileidy Paulino, Anabel Medina, Alexander Ogando, Luguelín Santos	Dominican Republic
3rd place, bronze medalist(s)		Trevor Stewart, Kendall Ellis, Kaylin Whitney, Vernon Norwood, Elija Godwin, Lynna Irby, Taylor Manson, Bryce Deadmon	United States

The mixed 4 × 400 metres relay at the 2020 Summer Olympics was held over two rounds at the Japan National Stadium in Tokyo, Japan, on 30 and 31 July 2021. There were 16 competing relay teams, with each team having four competing members (two men and two women). It was the first mixed-gender relay in athletics held at the Olympic Games, as part of a larger focus on gender equality by the International Olympic Committee.

The final was won by the team of Poland in an Olympic and European record of 3:09.87 min, followed by the Dominican Republic in second place in a national record of 3:10.21 min and the United States in third place in 3:10.22 min.

== Background ==
This was the first appearance of the event, added along with mixed team events in multiple sports for the 2020 Games. The mixed relay was first introduced at the 2017 IAAF World Relays. It was added to the World Championship programme at the 2019 World Athletics Championships.

The event used the two-round format introduced for other relay events in 2012. Each team consists of two men and two women. The team members can run in any order.

Prior to this competition, the existing world, Olympic, and area records are as follows.

Global records before the 2020 Summer Olympics
Record	Nation (athletes)	Time	Location	Date
World record	United States (Wilbert London, Allyson Felix, Courtney Okolo, Michael Cherry)	3:09.34	Doha, Qatar	29 September 2019
World leading	Germany (Marvin Schlegel, Manuel Sanders, Ruth Spelmeyer, Corinna Schwab)	3:13.57	Regensburg, Germany	19 June 2021
Olympic record	Vacant			

Area records before the 2020 Summer Olympics
Record	Nation (athletes)	Time	Location	Date
African record	Kenya (Jared Nyambweke Momanyi, Maureen Nyatichi Thomas, Hellen Syombua, Aron Koech)	3:16.90		
Asian record	Bahrain (Musa Isah, Aminat Yusuf Jamal, Salwa Eid Naser, Abbas Abubakar Abbas)	3:11.82		
European record	Great Britain (Rabah Yousif, Zoey Clark, Emily Diamond, Martyn Rooney)	3:12.27		
North America, Central America and Caribbean record	United States (Wilbert London, Allyson Felix, Courtney Okolo, Michael Cherry)	3:09.34 WR	Doha, Qatar	29 September 2019
Oceanian record	Australia (Steven Solomon, Murray Goodwin, Anneliese Rubie, Ella Connolly)	3:18.55		
South American record	Brazil (Anderson Henriques, Tiffani Marinho, Geisa Coutinho, Lucas Carvalho)	3:16.12		

== Qualification ==
A National Olympic Committee (NOC) could qualify a relay team of 4 athletes in one of three ways. A total of 16 NOCs qualified.

- The top 8 NOCs at the 2019 World Athletics Championships qualified a relay team.
- The top 8 NOCs at the 2021 World Athletics Relays qualified a relay team.
- Where an NOC placed in the top 8 at both the 2019 World Championships and the 2021 World Relays, the quota place was allocated to the world ranking list as of 29 June 2021. In this case, 3 teams did so, so there are 3 places available through the world rankings.

The qualifying period was originally from 1 May 2019 to 29 June 2020. Due to the COVID-19 pandemic, the period was suspended from 6 April 2020 to 30 November 2020, with the end date extended to 29 June 2021. The qualifying time standards could be obtained in various meets during the given period that have the approval of the IAAF. Both indoor and outdoor meets are eligible. The most recent Area Championships may be counted in the ranking, even if not during the qualifying period.

== Results ==
=== Round 1 ===
The two heats of round 1 were held on 30 July 2021 and started at 20:00 (UTC+9).

The first three athletes in each heat (Q) and the next two fastest athletes overall (q) qualified for the final.

After finishing first and second in their heat, the USA and Dominican Republic teams were initially disqualified for an alleged baton-changeover violation. Both teams appealed and the decision was reversed. This meant that the German and Spanish teams, that qualified after the disqualifications, did not qualify to the final—they protested, and it was decided that Germany could start the final as the ninth team. The Dutch and Belgian teams protested against the reinstatements—both protests were rejected by the Court of Arbitration for Sport.

Results of round 1
Rank	Heat	Lane	Nation	Competitors	Reaction	Time	Notes
1	2	2	Poland	Dariusz Kowaluk, Iga Baumgart-Witan, Małgorzata Hołub-Kowalik, Kajetan Duszyński	0.156	3:10.44	Q, OR, AR
2	2	9	Netherlands	Jochem Dobber, Lieke Klaver, Lisanne de Witte, Ramsey Angela	0.178	3:10.69	Q, NR
3	1	3	United States	Elija Godwin, Lynna Irby, Taylor Manson, Bryce Deadmon	0.182	3:11.39	Q, SB
4	2	5	Jamaica	Sean Bailey, Junelle Bromfield, Stacey-Ann Williams, Karayme Bartley	0.180	3:11.76	Q, NR
5	2	6	Great Britain	Cameron Chalmers, Zoey Clark, Emily Diamond, Lee Thompson	0.189	3:11.95	q, NR
6	1	7	Dominican Republic	Lidio Andrés Feliz, Marileidy Paulino, Anabel Medina, Luguelín Santos	0.253	3:12.74	Q, NR
7	1	2	Belgium	Alexander Doom, Imke Vervaet, Camille Laus, Jonathan Borlée	0.177	3:12.75	Q, NR
8	1	5	Ireland	Cillin Greene, Phil Healy, Sophie Becker, Christopher O'Donnell	0.137	3:12.88	q, NR
9	1	4	Germany	Marvin Schlegel, Corinna Schwab, Ruth Spelmeyer, Manuel Sanders	0.189	3:12.94	qJ, NR
10	1	6	Spain	Samuel García, Laura Bueno, Aauri Bokesa, Bernat Erta	0.176	3:13.29	NR
11	2	7	Italy	Edoardo Scotti, Alice Mangione, Rebecca Borga, Vladimir Aceti	0.184	3:13.51	NR
12	1	8	Nigeria	Ifeanyi Emmanuel Ojeli, Imaobong Nse Uko, Samson Oghenewegba Nathaniel, Patience Okon George	0.196	3:13.60	AR
13	2	4	Ukraine	Mykyta Barabanov, Kateryna Klymiuk, Alina Lohvynenko, Oleksandr Pohorilko	0.157	3:14.21	
14	2	8	Brazil	Pedro Luiz de Oliveira, Tiffani Marinho, Tábata de Carvalho, Anderson Henriques	0.185	3:15.89	AR
15	2	3	India	Muhammed Anas, Revathi Veeramani, Subha Venkatesan, Arokia Rajiv	0.158	3:19.93	SB

=== Final ===
The final was held on Saturday, 31 July 2021 at 21:35 (UTC+9).

In the first leg, the Netherlands' Liemarvin Bonevacia took the lead going in to the first handoff, with Karol Zalewski (Poland), Trevor Stewart (USA) and Dylan Borlée (Belgium) in contention. Through the third turn, Marileidy Paulino pulled Dominican Republic past all the teams, squeezing past the Netherlands' Lieke Klaver after the break to take the lead. Kendall Ellis powered through the fourth turn passing Poland's Natalia Kaczmarek and Klaver chasing after Paulino. Down the home stretch, Ellis tied up and Kaczmarek ran past. Anabel Medina left the pass with almost a 3-second Dominican lead. Netherlands went with their star 400 hurdler Femke Bol, along with Justyna Święty-Ersetic for Poland and Kaylin Whitney for USA separating as a 3-person pack in chase of Medina. Bol almost made it, pulling the pack to just behind Medina at the handoff, the teams leaving the zone with Alexander Ogando (DOM), Ramsey Angela (NED), Kajetan Duszyński (POL) and Vernon Norwood (USA) in a row. Halfway through the lap, Angela passed Ogando, then Duszyński gained through the final turn with Norwood in tow. Coming off the turn, Duszyński went past Angela into the lead. With 30 metres to go, the three chasers were in a row across the track, but Norwood had the momentum to move into second place. Duszyński had too much of a lead, crossing the finish line with his arms outstretched. Unable to catch Duszyński, Norwood relaxed and glided across the line, but Ogando continued to chase and won silver for the Dominican Republic.

Results of the final
Rank	Lane	Nation	Competitors	Reaction	Time	Notes
1st place, gold medalist(s)	5	Poland	Karol Zalewski, Natalia Kaczmarek, Justyna Święty-Ersetic, Kajetan Duszyński	0.157	3:09.87	OR AR
2nd place, silver medalist(s)	6	Dominican Republic	Lidio Andrés Feliz, Marileidy Paulino, Anabel Medina, Alexander Ogando	0.184	3:10.21	NR
3rd place, bronze medalist(s)	4	United States	Trevor Stewart, Kendall Ellis, Kaylin Whitney, Vernon Norwood	0.167	3:10.22	SB
4	7	Netherlands	Liemarvin Bonevacia, Lieke Klaver, Femke Bol, Ramsey Angela	0.209	3:10.36	NR
5	8	Belgium	Dylan Borlée, Imke Vervaet, Camille Laus, Kevin Borlée	0.165	3:11.51	NR
6	2	Great Britain	Nicklas Baker, Nicole Yeargin, Emily Diamond, Cameron Chalmers	0.169	3:12.07	
7	9	Jamaica	Sean Bailey, Stacey-Ann Williams, Tovea Jenkins, Karayme Bartley	0.208	3:14.95	
8	1	Ireland	Cillin Greene, Phil Healy, Sophie Becker, Christopher O'Donnell	0.140	3:15.04	
	3	Germany	Marvin Schlegel, Corinna Schwab, Nadine Gonska, Manuel Sanders	0.182	DQ	TR24.6.3
