= Athletics at the 2010 South American Games – Men's 4 × 400 metre relay =

The Men's 4x400m Relay event at the 2010 South American Games was held on March 23 at 19:15.

== Medalists ==
Gold	Silver	Bronze
Rubén Headly; Georni Jaramillo; Arturo Ramírez; Omar Longart; Venezuela	José Guilherme de Oliveira; Hederson Estefani; Henrique de Souza; Hélder Alves; Brazil	Juan Pablo Maturana; Brayan Ambuila; Javier Palacios; Rafith Rodríguez; Colombia

== Records ==
Standing records prior to the 2010 South American Games
World record	United States	2:54.29	Stuttgart, Germany	22 July 1993
World Leading	University of Technology (JAM)	3:05.33	Kingston, Jamaica	27 February 2010
South American record	Brazil	2:58.56	Winnipeg, Canada	30 July 1999
South American U23 record	Venezuela	3:04.88	Caracas, Venezuela	29 July 2001

== Results ==
Results were published.

Rank	Athlete	Nationality	Reaction	Result	Notes
1st place, gold medalist(s)	Rubén Headly; Georni Jaramillo; Arturo Ramírez; Omar Longart	Venezuela	0.217	3:06.53	
2nd place, silver medalist(s)	José Guilherme de Oliveira; Hederson Estefani; Henrique de Souza; Hélder Alves	Brazil	0.247	3:07.11	
3rd place, bronze medalist(s)	Juan Pablo Maturana; Brayan Ambuila; Javier Palacios; Rafith Rodríguez	Colombia	0.200	3:09.03	
4	Diego Lira; Iván López; José Alarcón; Tomás Squella	Chile	0.403	3:15.60	
5	Matías Larregle; Tomás Pérez; Andrés Mendoza; Maximiliano Díaz	Argentina	0.274	3:16.31	
6	Emerson Chala; Wilter Cagua; David Washco; Jorge Eduardo Montero	Ecuador	0.178	3:19.21	
–	Vitorio Gotuzzo; Julio Alfredo Pérez; Javier McFarlane; Jorge McFarlane	(Peru) Perú		DNS	

== See also ==
- 2010 South American Under-23 Championships in Athletics
