= Trevor Stewart (sprinter) =

American sprinter (born 1997)

Personal information
- Born: Trevor Stewart; May 20, 1997 (age 29) Lorton, Virginia, U.S.

Sport
- Sport: Track and Field
- Event: 400 metres
Medal record
Men's athletics
Representing the United States
Olympic Games
Gold medal – first place	2020 Tokyo	4 × 400 m relay
Bronze medal – third place	2020 Tokyo	4 × 400 m mixed

Trevor Stewart (born May 20, 1997) is an American Olympic athlete. He won a gold medal in the men's 4 × 400 metres relay and a bronze medal in the mixed 4 × 400 metres relay at the 2020 Summer Olympics.

== Biography ==
Stewart attended South County High School in Lorton, Virginia. He later studied at North Carolina A&T State University, where he was coached by Duane Ross. Stewart finished second at the 2019 NCAA Division I Outdoor Track and Field Championships over 400 metres in Austin, Texas, finishing behind Kahmari Montgomery from the University of Houston. In placing second, Stewart ran a personal best time of 44.25 seconds. It was the seventh fastest time worldwide by a man that year in the 400 metres.

Competing at the 2021 NCAA Division I Outdoor Track and Field Championships over 400 metres at Hayward Field at the University of Oregon in Eugene, he ran 44.96 seconds, placing fourth in the final behind Noah Williams, Bryce Deadmon and Randolph Ross. He then won in the men's 4 x 400 metres relay at the championships, running alongside Ross, Daniel Stokes and Akeem Sirleaf.

On 19 June 2021, he qualified for the final of the US Olympic Trials 400 metres race, running the fastest time of 44:75 in the heats, and fifth fastest in the semifinal. In the final he finished fourth in 44.90 seconds to qualify for the relay pool at the delayed 2020 Summer Games, held in Tokyo in 2021. He ran in the final of the Mixed 4 × 400 metres relay, winning a bronze medal alongside Kendall Ellis, Kaylin Whitney, Vernon Norwood. He also ran in the preliminary round of the men's 4 x 100 metres relay, with the USA team going on to win the gold medal in the final.

Stewart placed fourth with a time of 46.41 seconds at the 2022 USA Indoor Championships in Spokane. He was a semi-finalist at the 2023 and 2024 USA Outdoor Championships over 400 metres.

== Personal life ==
Stewart has been an asthmatic since childhood.
