= Georni Jaramillo =

Venezuelan decathlete (born 1989)

Personal information
- Full name: Georni Gregorio Jaramillo Cáceres
- Born: March 6, 1989 (age 37)
- Height: 1.80 m (5 ft 11 in)
- Weight: 85 kg (187 lb)

Sport
- Sport: Athletics
- Event(s): Decathlon, long jump

Georni Gregorio Jaramillo Cáceres (born 6 March 1989) is a Venezuelan athlete competing in the decathlon. He won the gold medal at the 2018 South American Games with a new national record of 7977 points.

== International competitions ==
Year	Competition	Venue	Position	Event	Notes
Representing Venezuela
2006	South American Youth Championships	Caracas, Venezuela	2nd	400 m hurdles (84 cm)	53.57
2007	South American Junior Championships	São Paulo, Brazil	3rd	400 m hurdles	53.55
2008	World Junior Championships	Bydgoszcz, Poland	34th (h)	110 m hurdles (99 cm)	14.34
2009	ALBA Games	Havana, Cuba	6th	400 m hurdles	53.18
2010	South American Games / 2010 South American U23 Championships	Medellín, Colombia	2nd	400 m hurdles	51.50
2010	South American Games / 2010 South American U23 Championships	Medellín, Colombia	1st	4 × 400 m relay	3:06.53
2011	South American Championships	Buenos Aires, Argentina	3rd	Decathlon	7051 pts
2011	Central American and Caribbean Championships	Mayagüez, Puerto Rico	–	Decathlon	DNF
2011	ALBA Games	Barquisimeto, Venezuela	2nd	Decathlon	7297 pts
2011	Pan American Games	Guadalajara, Mexico	6th	Decathlon	7679 pts
2012	Ibero-American Championships	Barquisimeto, Venezuela	1st	Long jump	8.02 m (w)
2013	South American Championships	Cartagena, Colombia	10th	Long jump	6.82 m
2015	South American Championships	Lima, Peru	2nd	Decathlon	7454 pts
2017	South American Championships	Asunción, Paraguay	2nd	Decathlon	8126 pts (w)
2017	Bolivarian Games	Santa Marta, Colombia	3rd	Decathlon	6745 pts
2018	South American Games	Cochabamba, Bolivia	1st	Decathlon	7977 pts
2018	Central American and Caribbean Games	Barranquilla, Colombia	–	Decathlon	DNF
2019	South American Championships	Lima, Peru	1st	Decathlon	7784 pts
2019	Pan American Games	Lima, Peru	4th	Decathlon	7913 pts
2019	World Championships	Doha, Qatar	19th	Decathlon	6645 pts
2021	South American Championships	Guayaquil, Ecuador	3rd	Decathlon	7613 pts
2022	South American Indoor Championships	Cochabamba, Bolivia	2nd	Heptathlon	5552 pts
2022	Bolivarian Games	Valledupar, Colombia	–	Decathlon	DNF
2023	ALBA Games	Caracas, Venezuela	1st	110 m hurdles	14.56
2023	ALBA Games	Caracas, Venezuela	3rd	Shot put	14.53 m
2023	ALBA Games	Caracas, Venezuela	3rd	Discus throw	45.18 m
2023	Central American and Caribbean Games	San Salvador, El Salvador	7th	110 m hurdles	14.35

== Personal bests ==
Outdoor

- 100 metres – 10.66 (+0.5 m/s, Cochabamba 2018)
- 400 metres – 47.92 (Cochabamba 2018)
- 1500 metres – 4:45.94 (Asunción 2017)
- 110 metres hurdles – 13.95 (-1.0 m/s, Cochabamba 2018)
- 400 metres hurdles – 50.78 (Caracas 2010)
- High jump – 1.90 (Barquisimeto 2011)
- Pole vault – 4.60 (Barinas 2017)
- Long jump – 7.71 (+0.9 m/s, Cochabamba 2018)
- Shot put – 16.10 (Barquisimeto 2018)
- Discus throw – 46.78 (Caracas 2017)
- Javelin throw – 63.61 (Caracas 2017)
- Decathlon – 8048 (Barquisimeto 2018)
