= Veerle Bakker =

Dutch athlete (born 1997)

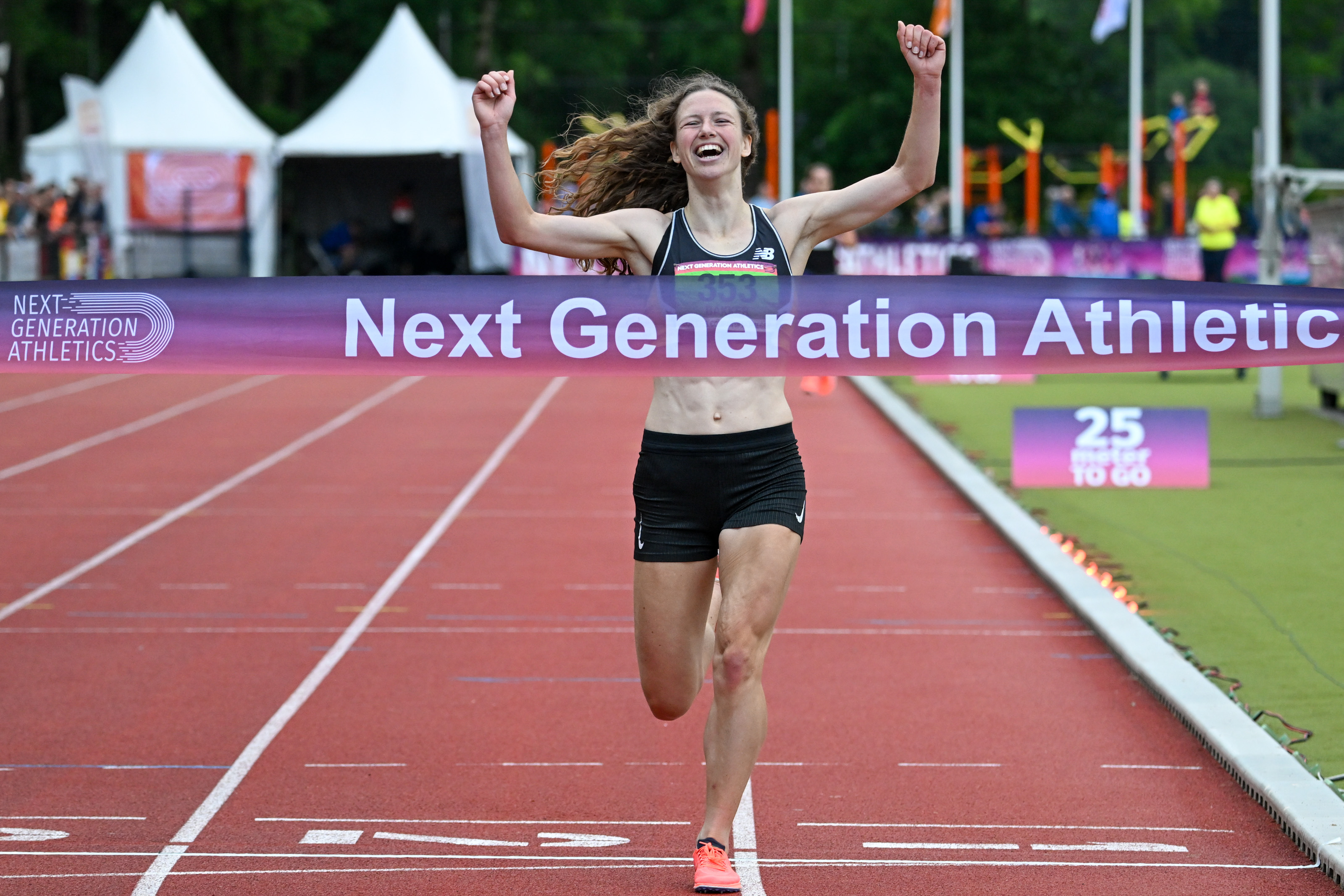
- Bakker becoming Dutch 10,000 m champion in 2024

Personal information
- Nationality: Dutch
- Born: 29 September 1997 (age 28)

Sport
- Sport: Athletics
- Event(s): Steeplechase, Cross country, Long distance running

Achievements and titles
- Personal bests: 3000 m: 8:58.03 i (2026); 5000 m: 15:21.26 (2025); 10,000 m: 32.36.64 (2024); 2000 m s'chase: 6:13.19 (2024, NB); 3000 m s'chase: 9:25.53 (2025, NR)

Veerle Bakker (pronounced [ˈveːrlə] [ˈbɑkər]; born 29 September 1997) is a Dutch long-distance and cross country runner and steeplechaser. She is a multiple-time Dutch national champion in the 3000m steeplechase and in 2025 won the Dutch national title in the 10,000 metres. She has competed at the European Cross Country Championships and the European Athletics Championships.

== Career ==
In 2022, competing for the University of Portland in the a United States, Bakker set a new school record of 9:11.90 in the women's 3000 metres whilst competing at the UW Husky Classic in the state of Washington.

She became Dutch national champion in the 3000m steeplechase in Apeldoorn in 2022 at the 2022 Dutch Athletics Championships. She competed at the 2022 European Cross Country Championships in Turin, Italy, in December 2022, finishing in tenth place overall.

She retained her Dutch national title in the 3000m steeplechase at the 2023 Dutch Athletics Championships in Breda, in July 2023. She competed at the 2023 European Cross Country Championships in Brussels, Belgium.

She ran a personal best time for the 3000 metres steeplechase of 9:45.19 in Karlsruhe, Germany in May 2024. The following week, she became Dutch champion over 10,000 metres in Nijmegen, running a personal best time of 32.36.64. She competed at the 2024 European Athletics Championships in Rome, Italy, in June 2024, placing eighteenth overall in the 10000 metres in a time of 33:07.14.

She represented the Netherlands at the 2025 European Running Championships in Belgium in April 2025. She lowered her personal best by 13 seconds running 9:30.67 in the 3000 metres steeplechase in Hengelo on 9 June 2025. She was selected for the Dutch team for the 2025 World Athletics Championships in Tokyo, Japan but did not qualify for the final of the 3000 metres steeplechase.

On 24 January 2026, Bakker set a new Dutch indoor national record over 5000 metres in Lyon, running 15:45.49. She placed second in the 3000 metres at the 2026 Dutch Indoor Athletics Championships in Apeldoorn. She also placed second in the 1500 metres at the championships.

== Personal life ==
She is from Amersfoort. She attended the University of Portland.
