= Athletics at the 2010 South American Games – Men's 400 metres =

The Men's 400m event at the 2010 South American Games was held on March 20, with the heats at 11:30 and the Final at 18:45.

== Medalists ==
| Gold | Silver | Bronze |
|---|---|---|
| Omar Longart; Venezuela | Hederson Estefani; Brazil | Hélder Alves; Brazil |

== Records ==
Standing records prior to the 2010 South American Games
| World record | Michael Johnson | United States | 43.18 | Seville, Spain | 26 August 1999 |
| World Leading | Ben Offereins | Australia | 44.86 | Sydney, Australia | 27 February 2010 |
| South American record | Sanderlei Parrela | Brazil | 44.29 | Seville, Spain | 26 August 1999 |
| South American U23 record | Andrés Silva | Uruguay | 45.02 | Fortaleza, Brazil | 17 May 2006 |

== Results ==
Results were published.

=== Heats ===
==== Heat 1 ====
| Rank | Athlete | Nationality | Reaction | Result | Notes |
|---|---|---|---|---|---|
| 1 | Hélder Alves | Brazil | 0.199 | 48.30 | Q |
| 2 | Jorge Eduardo Montero | Ecuador | 0.238 | 48.32 | Q |
| 3 | Javier Palacios | Colombia | 0.405 | 48.34 | Q |
| 4 | Rubén Headly | Venezuela | 0.209 | 48.60 | q |
| 5 | Julio Alfredo Pérez | (Peru) Perú | 0.255 | 48.79 | |
| 6 | Diego Lira | Chile | 0.385 | 49.12 | |

==== Heat 2 ====
| Rank | Athlete | Nationality | Reaction | Result | Notes |
|---|---|---|---|---|---|
| 1 | Omar Longart | Venezuela | 0.238 | 46.94 | Q |
| 2 | Hederson Estefani | Brazil | 0.229 | 47.23 | Q |
| 3 | Terrence Agard | Netherlands Antilles | 0.222 | 47.95 | Q, ^{†} |
| 4 | Matías Larregle | Argentina | 0.205 | 48.24 | q |
| 5 | Johan Ramírez | Colombia | 0.235 | 48.79 | |
| 6 | Wilter Cagua | Ecuador | 0.225 | 49.73 | |

^{†}: Not eligible for the South American Under-23 Championships.

=== Final ===
| Rank | Athlete | Nationality | Reaction | Result | Notes |
|---|---|---|---|---|---|
| 1st place, gold medalist(s) | Omar Longart | Venezuela | 0.516 | 46.09 | PB |
| 2nd place, silver medalist(s) | Hederson Estefani | Brazil | 0.281 | 46.85 | |
| 3rd place, bronze medalist(s) | Hélder Alves | Brazil | 0.150 | 47.40 | |
| 4 | Terrence Agard | Netherlands Antilles | 0.295 | 47.47 | ^{†} |
| 5 | Jorge Eduardo Montero | Ecuador | 0.280 | 48.04 | |
| 6 | Rubén Headly | Venezuela | 0.194 | 48.08 | |
| 7 | Javier Palacios | Colombia | 0.458 | 48.61 | |
| – | Matías Larregle | Argentina | | DNS | |

^{†}: Not eligible for the South American Under-23 Championships.

== See also ==
- 2010 South American Under-23 Championships in Athletics
