= Hederson Estefani =

Brazilian athlete (born 1991)

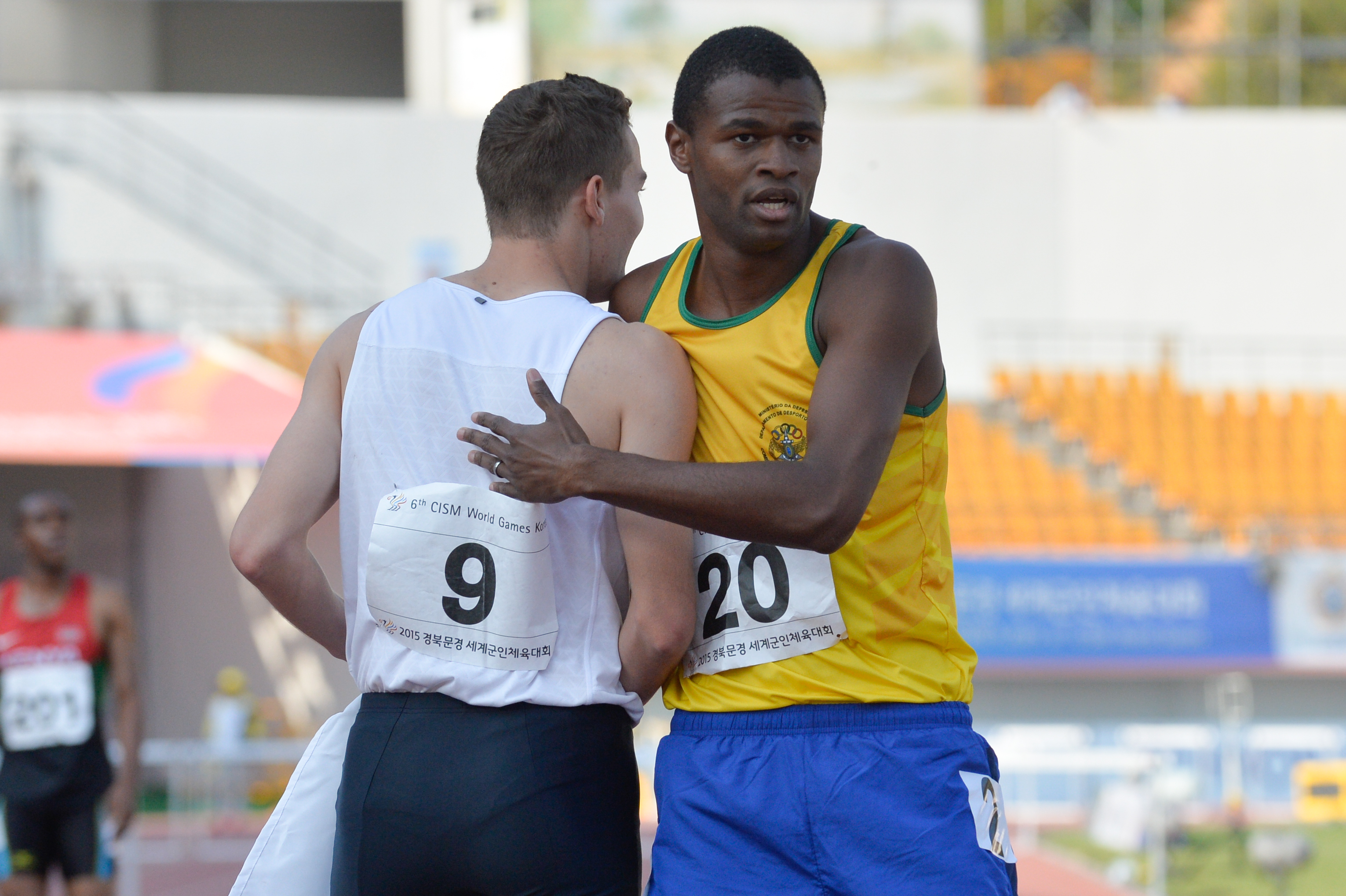
- Hederson Estefani in 2015

Personal information
- Born: 11 September 1991 (age 34)
- Height: 1.83 m (6 ft 0 in)
- Weight: 65 kg (143 lb)

Sport
- Sport: Track and field
- Events: 400 m, 400 m hurdles

Hederson Alves Estefani (born 11 September 1991) is a Brazilian athlete competing primarily in the 400 metres and 400 m hurdles. He represented his country at the 2015 World Championships in Beijing without advancing from the first round.

== International competitions ==
Year	Competition	Venue	Position	Event	Notes
Representing Brazil
2008	South American Youth Championships	Lima, Peru	1st	400 m hurdles (84 cm)	51.67
2008	South American Youth Championships	Lima, Peru	1st	Medley relay	1:54.10
2009	South American Junior Championships	São Paulo, Brazil	1st	400 m	46.20
2009	South American Junior Championships	São Paulo, Brazil	1st	400 m hurdles	51.07
2009	South American Junior Championships	São Paulo, Brazil	1st	4x400 m relay	3:10.66
2009	Pan American Junior Championships	São Paulo, Brazil	3rd (h)	400 m	46.70^{1}
2009	Pan American Junior Championships	São Paulo, Brazil	4th	400 m hurdles	51.11
2010	South American Games / 2010 South American U23 Championships	Medellín, Colombia	2nd	400 m	46.85
2010	South American Games / 2010 South American U23 Championships	Medellín, Colombia	4th	400 m hurdles	52.43
2010	South American Games / 2010 South American U23 Championships	Medellín, Colombia	2nd	4x400 m relay	3:07.11
2010	Ibero-American Championships	San Fernando, Spain	2nd	4x400 m relay	3:05.43
2010	World Junior Championships	Moncton, Canada	9th (h)	400 m hurdles	51.59
2011	South American Championships	Buenos Aires, Argentina	1st	4x400 m relay	3:08.95
2012	Ibero-American Championships	Barquisimeto, Venezuela	3rd	400 m hurdles	49.70
2012	Ibero-American Championships	Barquisimeto, Venezuela	4th	4x400 m relay	3:03.05
2012	South American U23 Championships	Barquisimeto, Venezuela	1st	400 m hurdles	51.02
2013	South American Championships	Cartagena, Colombia	3rd	4x400 m relay	3:08.60
2014	Ibero-American Championships	São Paulo, Brazil	2nd	4x400 m relay	3:02.80
2015	IAAF World Relays	Nassau, Bahamas	5th	4x400 m relay	3:00.96
2015	South American Championships	Lima, Peru	2nd	400 m	45.57
2015	South American Championships	Lima, Peru	2nd	400 m hurdles	49.54
2015	Pan American Games	Toronto, Canada	10th (h)	400 m hurdles	51.06
2015	Pan American Games	Toronto, Canada	5th	4x400 m relay	3:01.18
2015	World Championships	Beijing, China	30th (h)	400 m	45.36
2015	World Championships	Beijing, China	12th (h)	4x400 m relay	3:01.05
2016	Ibero-American Championships	Rio de Janeiro, Brazil	15th (h)	400 m	61.54
2016	Olympic Games	Rio de Janeiro, Brazil	41st (h)	400 m	46.68
2017	World Championships	London, United Kingdom	25th (h)	400 m hurdles	50.22
2018	South American Games	Cochabamba, Bolivia	4th	400 m	46.15
2022	South American Games	Asunción, Paraguay	3rd	400 m hurdles	50.99

^{1}Disqualified in the final

== Personal bests ==
Outdoor

- 400 metres – 45.25 (São Paulo 2012)
- 400 metres hurdles – 49.40 (São Bernardo do Campo 2015)
