= Athletics at the 2020 Summer Olympics – Men's 4 × 400 metres relay =

Men's 4 × 400 metres relay at the Games of the XXXII Olympiad
- Olympic Athletics
- Venue: Japan National Stadium
- Dates: 6 August 2021 (round 1); 7 August 2021 (final)
- Competitors: 71 from 16 nations
- Winning time: 2:55.70

Medalists
1st place, gold medalist(s)		Michael Cherry; Michael Norman; Bryce Deadmon; Rai Benjamin; Trevor Stewart*; Randolph Ross*; Vernon Norwood*	United States
2nd place, silver medalist(s)		Liemarvin Bonevacia; Terrence Agard; Tony van Diepen; Ramsey Angela; Jochem Dobber*	Netherlands
3rd place, bronze medalist(s)		Isaac Makwala; Baboloki Thebe; Zibane Ngozi; Bayapo Ndori	Botswana

The men's 4 × 400 metres relay event at the 2020 Summer Olympics took place on 6 and 7 August 2021 at the Japan National Stadium. There were 16 competing relay teams, with each team having up to 8 members from which 4 were selected in each round.

== Background ==
This was the 25th appearance of the event, having appeared at every Olympics since 1912.

== Qualification ==
A National Olympic Committee (NOC) could qualify a relay team of 8 athletes in one of three ways. A total of 16 NOCs qualified.

- The top 8 NOCs at the 2019 World Athletics Championships qualified a relay team.
- The top 8 NOCs at the 2021 World Athletics Relays qualified a relay team.
- Where an NOC placed in the top 8 at both the 2019 World Championships and the 2021 World Relays, the quota place was allocated to the world ranking list as of 29 June 2021. In this case, 4 teams did so, so there are 4 places available through the world rankings.

The qualifying period was originally from 1 May 2019 to 29 June 2020. Due to the COVID-19 pandemic, the period was suspended from 6 April 2020 to 30 November 2020, with the end date extended to 29 June 2021. The qualifying time standards could be obtained in various meets during the given period that have the approval of the IAAF. Both indoor and outdoor meets are eligible. The most recent Area Championships may be counted in the ranking, even if not during the qualifying period.

== Competition format ==
The event continued to use the two-round format introduced in 2012.

== Records ==
Prior to this competition, the existing world, Olympic, and area records were as follows.

World record	Andrew Valmon, Quincy Watts, Butch Reynolds, Michael Johnson (USA)	2:54.29	Stuttgart, Germany	22 August 1993
Olympic record	LaShawn Merritt, Angelo Taylor, David Neville, Jeremy Wariner (USA)	2:55.39	Beijing, China	23 August 2008

Area	Time (s)	Athlete	Nation
Africa (records)	2:58.68	Clement Chukwu; Jude Monye; Sunday Bada; Enefiok Udo-Obong	Nigeria
Asia (records)	3:00.56	Abderrahman Samba; Mohamed Nasir Abbas; Mohamed El Nour; Abdalelah Haroun	Qatar
Europe (records)	2:56.60	Iwan Thomas; Jamie Baulch; Mark Richardson; Roger Black	Great Britain
North, Central America and Caribbean (records)	2:54.29 WR	Andrew Valmon; Quincy Watts; Butch Reynolds; Michael Johnson	United States
Oceania (records)	2:59.70	Darren Clark; Rick Mitchell; Gary Minihan; Bruce Frayne	Australia
South America (records)	2:58.56	Eronilde de Araújo; Anderson Jorge dos Santos; Claudinei da Silva; Sanderlei Parrela	Brazil

The following national records were established during the competition:

Country	Athletes	Round	Time	Notes
Botswana	Isaac Makwala, Baboloki Thebe, Zibane Ngozi, Bayapo Ndori (BOT)	Heats	2:58.33	AR
Botswana	Isaac Makwala, Baboloki Thebe, Zibane Ngozi, Bayapo Ndori (BOT)	Final	2:57.27	AR
Italy	Alessandro Sibilio, Vladimir Aceti, Edoardo Scotti, Davide Re (ITA)	Heats	2:58.91	
Italy	Davide Re, Vladimir Aceti, Edoardo Scotti, Alessandro Sibilio (ITA)	Final	2:58.81	
Netherlands	Jochem Dobber, Terrence Agard, Tony van Diepen, Ramsey Angela (NED)	Heats	2:59.06	
Netherlands	Liemarvin Bonevacia, Terrence Agard, Tony van Diepen, Ramsey Angela (NED)	Final	2:57.18	
India	Muhammed Anas, Noah Nirmal Tom, Amoj Jacob, Arokia Rajiv (IND)	Heats	3:00.25	AR
Japan	Rikuya Itō, Kaito Kawabata, Kentarō Satō, Aoto Suzuki (JPN)	Heats	3:00.76	
Belgium	Alexander Doom, Jonathan Sacoor, Dylan Borlée, Kevin Borlée (BEL)	Final	2:57.88	

== Schedule ==
All times are Japan Standard Time (UTC+9)

The men's 4 × 400 metres relay took place over two consecutive days.

Date	Time	Round
Friday, 6 August 2021	19:50	Round 1
Saturday, 7 August 2021	21:50	Final

== Results ==
=== Heats ===
Qualification Rules: First 3 in each heat (Q) and the next 2 fastest (q) advance to the Final

==== Heat 1 ====
Rank	Lane	Nation	Competitors	Reaction	Time	Notes
1	7	United States	Trevor Stewart, Randolph Ross, Bryce Deadmon, Vernon Norwood	0.180	2:57.77	Q, SB
2	9	Botswana	Isaac Makwala, Baboloki Thebe, Zibane Ngozi, Bayapo Ndori	0.200	2:58.33	Q, AR
3	3	Trinidad and Tobago	Deon Lendore, Jereem Richards, Machel Cedenio, Dwight St. Hillaire	0.193	2:58.60	Q, SB
4	4	Italy	Alessandro Sibilio, Vladimir Aceti, Edoardo Scotti, Davide Re	0.144	2:58.91	q, NR
5	2	Netherlands	Jochem Dobber, Terrence Agard, Tony van Diepen, Ramsey Angela	0.178	2:59.06	q, NR
6	5	Great Britain	Cameron Chalmers, Joe Brier, Lee Thompson, Michael Ohioze	0.245	3:03.29	SB
7	6	Czech Republic	Patrik Šorm, Pavel Maslák, Michal Desenský, Vít Müller	0.169	3:03.61	
8	8	Germany	Marvin Schlegel, Luke Campbell, Jean Paul Bredau, Manuel Sanders	0.197	3:03.62	

==== Heat 2 ====
Rank	Lane	Nation	Competitors	Reaction	Time	Notes
1	8	Poland	Dariusz Kowaluk, Karol Zalewski, Jakub Krzewina, Kajetan Duszyński	0.160	2:58.55	Q, SB
2	4	Jamaica	Demish Gaye, Jaheel Hyde, Karayme Bartley, Nathon Allen	0.188	2:59.29	Q, SB
3	6	Belgium	Alexander Doom, Jonathan Sacoor, Dylan Borlée, Jonathan Borlée	0.148	2:59.37	Q, SB
4	2	India	Muhammed Anas, Noah Nirmal Tom, Arokia Rajiv, Amoj Jacob	0.138	3:00.25	AR
5	7	Japan	Rikuya Itō, Kaito Kawabata, Kentarō Satō, Aoto Suzuki	0.143	3:00.76	=NR
6	5	France	Thomas Jordier, Muhammad Abdallah Kounta, Ludovic Ouceni, Gilles Biron	0.166	3:00.81	
7	9	South Africa	Lythe Pillay, Zakithi Nene, Ranti Dikgale, Thapelo Phora	0.151	3:01.18	SB
8	3	Colombia	Jhon Perlaza, Diego Palomeque, Raúl Mena, Jhon Solís	0.164	3:03.20	SB

=== Final ===
Rank	Lane	Nation	Competitors	Reaction	Time	Notes
1st place, gold medalist(s)	4	United States	Michael Cherry, Michael Norman, Bryce Deadmon, Rai Benjamin	0.185	2:55.70	SB
2nd place, silver medalist(s)	2	Netherlands	Liemarvin Bonevacia, Terrence Agard, Tony van Diepen, Ramsey Angela	0.176	2:57.18	NR
3rd place, bronze medalist(s)	7	Botswana	Isaac Makwala, Baboloki Thebe, Zibane Ngozi, Bayapo Ndori	0.212	2:57.27	AR
4	9	Belgium	Alexander Doom, Jonathan Sacoor, Dylan Borlée, Kevin Borlée	0.149	2:57.88	NR
5	6	Poland	Dariusz Kowaluk, Karol Zalewski, Mateusz Rzeźniczak, Kajetan Duszyński	0.157	2:58.46	SB
6	5	Jamaica	Demish Gaye, Christopher Taylor, Jaheel Hyde, Nathon Allen	0.195	2:58.76	SB
7	3	Italy	Davide Re, Vladimir Aceti, Edoardo Scotti, Alessandro Sibilio	0.161	2:58.81	NR
8	8	Trinidad and Tobago	Deon Lendore, Jereem Richards, Dwight St. Hillaire, Machel Cedenio	0.179	3:00.85	
