= Taylor Manson =

American sprinter (born 1999)

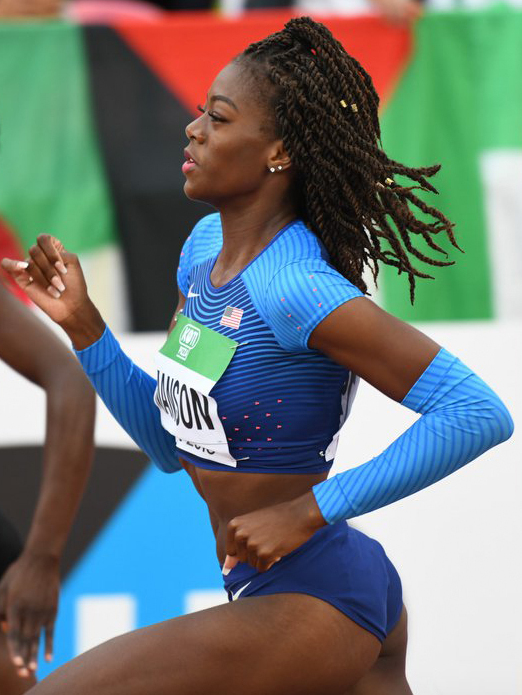
- Manson in 2018

Personal information
- Born: September 29, 1999 (age 27)

Sport
- Country: United States
- Sport: Athletics (Track and Field)
- Event: 400 metres
Medal record
Women's athletics
Representing the United States
Olympic Games
Bronze medal – third place	2020 Tokyo	4 × 400 m mixed

Taylor Manson (born September 29, 1999) is an American athlete who competes primarily in the 400 m.

From East Lansing, Michigan, she studied at East Lansing High School and at the University of Florida. She was a 2018 IAAF World U20 Championships gold medalist in the 4 × 400 m and bronze medalist in the individual 400 m.

At the 2020 U.S. Olympic Trials held in Eugene, Oregon, Manson reached the final of the 400 m and qualified for relay pool of the 4 × 400 m relay at the 2020 Summer Games. At the Olympics she took part in the mixed 4 × 400 metres relay.
