= Athletics at the 2010 South American Games – Men's 400 metre hurdles =

The Men's 400m Hurdles event at the 2010 South American Games was held on March 22 at 17:30.

== Medalists ==
| Gold | Silver | Bronze |
|---|---|---|
| Juan Pablo Maturana; Colombia | Georni Jaramillo; Venezuela | Brayan Ambuila; Colombia |

== Records ==
Standing records prior to the 2010 South American Games
| World record | Kevin Young | United States | 46.78 | Barcelona, Spain | 6 August 1992 |
| World Leading | Danny McFarlane | Jamaica | 49.12 | Sydney, Australia | 27 February 2010 |
| South American record | Bayano Kamani | (Panama) Panamá | 47.84 | Helsinki, Finland | 7 August 2005 |
| South American U23 record | Everson da Silva Teixeira | Brazil | 48.28 | Atlanta, United States | 30 July 1996 |

== Results ==
Results were published.

| Rank | Athlete | Nationality | Result | Notes |
|---|---|---|---|---|
| 1st place, gold medalist(s) | Juan Pablo Maturana | Colombia | 50.95 | |
| 2nd place, silver medalist(s) | Georni Jaramillo | Venezuela | 51.50 | |
| 3rd place, bronze medalist(s) | Brayan Ambuila | Colombia | 51.79 | |
| 4 | Hederson Estefani | Brazil | 52.43 | |
| 5 | Thiago Nogueira de Souza | Brazil | 52.47 | |
| 6 | Wilter Cagua | Ecuador | 53.72 | |
| 7 | Matías Agustín Cruz | Chile | 53.75 | SB |
| 8 | Emerson Chala | Ecuador | 54.43 | |

== See also ==
- 2010 South American Under-23 Championships in Athletics
