= List of Dutch records in athletics =

The following are the national records in athletics in the Netherlands maintained by its national athletics federation: Atletiekunie.

== Outdoor ==
Key to tables: Awaiting ratification Record not kept by Atletiekunie Not ratified or later rescinded by Atletiekunie

=== Men ===
Event	Record	Athlete	Date	Meet	Place	Ref.
100 m	9.91 (+0.7 m/s)	Churandy Martina	5 August 2012	Olympic Games	London, United Kingdom	
150 m (straight)	15.21 (−1.1 m/s)	Churandy Martina	9 May 2015	Manchester City Games	Manchester, Great Britain	
150 m (bend)	15.34 (+0.5 m/s)	Taymir Burnet	8 September 2020	Golden Spike Ostrava	Ostrava, Czech Republic	
200 m	19.81 (+0.4 m/s)	Churandy Martina	25 August 2016	Athletissima	Lausanne, Switzerland	
200 m straight	20.48 (−0.6 m/s)	Solomon Bockarie	4 September 2016	Urban Memorial Van Damme	Brussels, Belgium	
300 m	32.25	Liemarvin Bonevacia	28 June 2017	Golden Spike Ostrava	Ostrava, Czech Republic	
400 m	44.41	Jonas Phijffers	12 August 2026	European Championships	Birmingham, United Kingdom	
400 m (road)	47.40	Tony van Diepen	7 September 2019	Great City Games	Newcastle, United Kingdom	
600 m	1:15.26	Bram Som	17 September 2000		Brisbane, Australia	
800 m	1:43.45	Bram Som	18 August 2006	Weltklasse Zürich	Zurich, Switzerland	
1000 m	2:14.37	Niels Laros	7 July 2024	Fanny Blankers-Koen Games	Hengelo, Netherlands	
1500 m	3:29.20	Niels Laros	28 August 2025	Weltklasse Zürich	Zurich, Switzerland	
Mile	3:45.94	Niels Laros	5 July 2025	Prefontaine Classic	Eugene, United States	
Mile (road)	3:57.84	Stefan Nillessen	19 September 2026	World Road Running Championships	Copenhagen, Denmark	
2000 m	4:49.68	Niels Laros	8 September 2023	Memorial Van Damme	Brussels, Belgium	
3000 m	7:30.42	Tim Verbaandert	16 May 2026	Shanghai Diamond League	Shaoxing/Keqiao, China	
5000 m	13:02.43	Mike Foppen	15 June 2025	BAUHAUS-galan	Stockholm, Sweden	
5 km (road)	13:15	Mike Foppen	19 September 2026	World Road Running Championships	Copenhagen, Denmark	
10,000 m	27:20.52	Mike Foppen	28 March 2026	The TEN	San Juan Capistrano, United States	
10 km (road)	27:17	Tim Verbaandert	4 April 2026	Urban Trail de Lille AG2R LA MONDIALE	Lille, France	
15 km (road) (Note: not ratified from 1 January 2019 onwards)	42:42	Mike Foppen	16 November 2025	NN Zevenheuvelenloop	Nijmegen, Netherlands	
20,000 m (track)	57:24.2+	Jos Hermens	1 May 1976	One hour run Papendal	Arnhem, Netherlands	
20 km (road) (Note: not ratified from 1 January 2019 onwards)	57:18+ (Note: not ratified from 1 January 2019 onwards)	Abdi Nageeye	3 February 2019	Kagawa Marugame Half Marathon	Marugame, Japan	
One hour	20944 m	Jos Hermens	1 May 1976	One hour run Papendal	Arnhem, Netherlands	
Half marathon	1:00:21	Abdi Nageeye	10 March 2024	Den Haag Half Marathon	Den Haag, Netherlands	
25,000 m (track)	1:18:53.1+	Cor Vriend	22 August 1981		Veldhoven, Netherlands	
25 km (road)	1:13:00+	Abdi Nageeye	27 April 2025	London Marathon	London, United Kingdom	
30,000 m (track)	1:34:36.4	Cor Vriend	22 August 1981		Veldhoven, Netherlands	
30 km (road)	1:27:48+	Abdi Nageeye	27 April 2025	London Marathon	London, United Kingdom	
Marathon	2:04:20	Abdi Nageeye	27 April 2025	London Marathon	London, United Kingdom	
50 km (road)	3:25:30	Ruben van Zeijl	12 September 2026	RUN Winschoten NK 50 km	Winschoten, Netherlands	
100 km (road)	6:18:47	Piet Wiersma	27 August 2022	IAU 100 km World Championships	Berlin, Germany	
110 m hurdles	13.15 (+0.3 m/s)	Robin Korving	2 July 1999	Athletissima	Lausanne, Switzerland	
200 m hurdles	23.20	Christoph Kempen	1998	Arena Games	Hilversum, The Netherlands	
400 m hurdles	48.36	Nick Smidt	2 July 2023	Resisprint International	La Chaux-de-Fonds, Switzerland	
400 m hurdles	48.36 (Note: no doping test)	Nick Smidt	21 August 2024	Borås Folksam Grand Prix	Borås, Sweden	
3000 m steeplechase	8:04.95	Simon Vroemen	26 August 2005	Memorial Van Damme	Brussels, Belgium	
High jump	2.30 m	Wilbert Pennings	7 August 1999	Internationales Hochsprung-Meeting Eberstadt	Eberstadt, Germany	
Pole vault	5.92 m	Menno Vloon	1 September 2024	ISTAF Berlin	Berlin, Germany	
Long jump	8.29 m (+0.4 m/s)	Ignisious Gaisah	16 August 2013	World Championships	Moscow, Russia	
Triple jump	16.92 m (+2.0 m/s)	Fabian Florant	30 April 2016	Spring Invitational	Clermont, United States	
Shot put	21.62 m	Rutger Smith	10 June 2006	Gouden Spike	Leiden, Netherlands	
Discus throw	71.22 m	Ruben Rolvink	31 May 2026	Oklahoma Throws Series	Ramona, United States	
Hammer throw	79.09 m	Denzel Comenentia	17 May 2024	USATF Throws Fest	Los Angeles, United States	
Javelin throw	80.70 m Mx	Thomas van Ophem	7 June 2017		Castricum, Netherlands	
Decathlon	8607 pts	Sven Roosen	2–3 August 2024	Olympic Games	Paris, France	
Decathlon	100m (wind) / Long jump (wind) / Shot put / High jump / 400m / 110m H (wind) / Discus / Pole vault / Javelin / 1500m; 10.52 (+0.8 m/s) / 7.56 m (−0.6 m/s) / 15.10 m / 1.87 m / 46.40 / 13.99 (+0.7 m/s) / 46.88 m / 4.70 m / 63.72 m / 4:18.55					
10,000 m walk (track)	41:35.7	Harold van Beek	2 June 1995		Zaandam, Netherlands	
10 km walk (road)	42:57	Harold van Beek	3 February 1991		Rotterdam, Netherlands	
20,000 m walk (track)	1:27:48.1	Harold van Beek	15 July 1995		Bergen op Zoom, Netherlands	
20 km walk (road)	1:24:52	Harold van Beek	1 May 1992		Vigneulles, France	
Half marathon walk (road)	2:01:42	Remco de Bruin	4 October 2026	Dutch Championships Race Walk	Tilburg, Netherlands	
Two hours walk (track)	26454 m+	Harold van Beek	31 July 1993		Spijkenisse, Netherlands	
30,000 m walk (track)	2:18:25.7	Harold van Beek	31 July 1993		Spijkenisse, Netherlands	
30 km walk (road)	2:17:57	Harold van Beek	17 June 1995		Aarhus, Denmark	
Marathon walk (road)	4:09:47	Edwin van Wijngaarden	4 October 2026	Dutch Championships Race Walk	Tilburg, Netherlands	
50,000 m walk (track)	4:15:29.5	Jan Cortenbach	9 October 1985		Leiden, Netherlands	
50 km walk (road)	3:58:21	Harold van Beek	5 April 1992		Békéscsaba, Hungary	
4 × 100 m relay	37.81	Netherlands; Nsikak Ekpo; Taymir Burnet; Xavi Mo-Ajok; Elvis Afrifa	21 September 2025	World Championships	Tokyo, Japan	
4 × 200 m relay	1:23.61	Netherlands; Hans Veurink; Paul Franklin; Frank Perri; Regillio van der Vloot	31 May 1993		Hilversum, Netherlands	
Swedish relay	1:52.82	Rotterdam Atletiek Club Team; Rikkert van Rhee; Daniel de Wild; Micheal Mathew; Patrick van Luijk	18 September 2005		Amstelveen, Netherlands	
4 × 400 m relay	2:57.18	Netherlands; Liemarvin Bonevacia; Terrence Agard; Tony van Diepen; Ramsey Angela	7 August 2021	Olympic Games	Tokyo, Japan	
4 × 800 m relay	7:18.84	Atletico '73 Gendringen Club Team; Joeri Voltman; Gert-Jan Liefers; Arnoud Okken; Bram Som	23 September 2001		Amstelveen, Netherlands	
4 × 1500 m relay	15:08.90	Netherlands; Simon Vroemen; Berthold Berger; Leon Haan; Han Kulker	5 June 1992		Sheffield, United Kingdom	
Ekiden relay	2:03:12	Netherlands; Greg van Hest / 5 km Simon Vroemen / 10 km Gerard Kappert / 5 km Henk Gommer / 10 km Ren Godlieb / 5 km ? / 7.195 km	23 November 1994	International Chiba Ekiden	Chiba, Japan	

=== Women ===
Event	Record	Athlete	Date	Meet	Place	Ref.	Video
100 m	10.81 (−0.3 m/s)	Dafne Schippers	24 August 2015	World Championships	Beijing, China		
150 m (bend)	16.56 (+0.6 m/s)	Dafne Schippers	8 September 2020	Golden Spike Ostrava	Ostrava, Czech Republic		
150 m (straight)	16.95 (+0.3 m/s)	Dafne Schippers	9 May 2015	Manchester City Games	Manchester, Great Britain		
200 m	21.63 (+0.2 m/s)	Dafne Schippers	28 August 2015	World Championships	Beijing, China		
300 m	35.37+	Lieke Klaver	12 July 2024	Herculis	Fontvieille, Monaco		
400 m	49.44	Femke Bol	17 August 2022	European Championships	Munich, Germany		
400 m (road)	55.80	Laura de Witte	7 September 2019	Great City Games	Newcastle, Great Britain		
500 m (road)	1:07.19	Lisanne de Witte	9 September 2017	Great City Games	Newcastle, Great Britain		
600 m	1:27.10	Lisanne de Witte	11 May 2024	Ter Specke Bokaal	Lisse, Netherlands		
800 m	1:54.71	Femke Broeders-Bol	27 August 2026	Weltklasse Zürich	Zurich, Switzerland		
1000 m	2:34.68	Sifan Hassan	24 May 2015	Fanny Blankers-Koen Games	Hengelo, Netherlands		
1500 m	3:51.95	Sifan Hassan	5 October 2019	World Championships	Doha, Qatar		
Mile	4:12.33	Sifan Hassan	12 July 2019	Herculis	Fontvieille, Monaco		
Mile (road)	4:30.3 h Wo	Marissa Damink	1 September 2024	New Balance Kö Meile	Düsseldorf, Germany		
2000 m	5:38.37	Susan Kuijken	31 August 2013	Flame Games	Amsterdam, Netherlands		
3000 m	8:18.49	Sifan Hassan	30 June 2019	Prefontaine Classic	Stanford, United States		
5000 m	14:13.42	Sifan Hassan	23 July 2023	Anniversary Games	London, United Kingdom		
5 km (road)	14:33	Diane van Es	15 February 2026	Monaco Run	Monaco		
10,000 m	29:06.82	Sifan Hassan	6 June 2021	Fanny Blankers-Koen Games	Hengelo, Netherlands		
10 km (road)	30:29	Diane van Es	12 February 2023	Dutch 10km Championships	Schoorl, Netherlands		
15 km (road)	46:09+	Sifan Hassan	16 September 2018	Copenhagen Half Marathon	Copenhagen, Denmark		
One hour	18,930 m	Sifan Hassan	4 September 2020	Memorial Van Damme	Brussels, Belgium		
20,000 m (track)	1:42:04.0+	Ria Buiten	28 September 1996		Nantes, France		
20 km (road)	1:01:56+	Sifan Hassan	16 September 2018	Copenhagen Half Marathon	Copenhagen, Denmark		
Half marathon	1:05:15	Sifan Hassan	16 September 2018	Copenhagen Half Marathon	Copenhagen, Denmark		
25 km (road)	1:21:20+ Wo	Sifan Hassan	23 April 2023	London Marathon	London, United Kingdom		
25 km (road)	1:18:06+ Mx	Sifan Hassan	8 October 2023	Chicago Marathon	Chicago, United States		
30,000 m (track)	2:32:12.0	Ria Buiten	28 September 1996		Nantes, France		
30 km (road)	1:37:23+ Wo	Sifan Hassan	23 April 2023	London Marathon	London, United Kingdom		
30 km (road)	1:34:00+ Mx	Sifan Hassan	8 October 2023	Chicago Marathon	Chicago, United States		
Marathon	2:13:44 Mx	Sifan Hassan	8 October 2023	Chicago Marathon	Chicago, United States		
Marathon	2:18:33 Wo	Sifan Hassan	23 April 2023	London Marathon	London, United Kingdom		
100 km (road)	7:35:44	Irene Kinnegim	13 October 2018		Amiens, France		
100 m hurdles	12.28 (+1.1 m/s)	Nadine Visser	16 August 2025	Kamila Skolimowska Memorial	Chorzów, Poland		
200 m hurdles	26.57	Ester van Ooijen	1999	Hilversum Arena Games	Hilversum, Netherlands		
300 m hurdles	36.86	Femke Bol	31 May 2022	Golden Spike Ostrava	Ostrava, Czech Republic		
400 m hurdles	50.95	Femke Bol	14 July 2024	Resisprint International	La Chaux-de-Fonds, Switzerland		
Mile steeplechase	4:56.02	Veerle Bakker	22 August 2025	Memorial Van Damme	Brussels, Belgium		
2000 m steeplechase	6:13.19	Veerle Bakker	1 September 2024	ISTAF Berlin	Berlin, Germany		
3000 m steeplechase	9:25.53	Veerle Bakker	9 August 2025	IFAM Oordegem	Oordegem, Belgium		
High jump	1.95 m	Britt Weerman	16 July 2022		Ninove, Belgium		
Pole vault	4.56 m	Marijn Kieft	26 July 2026	Dutch Championships	Hengelo, Netherlands		
Long jump	6.91 m (+1.7 m/s)	Pauline Hondema	12 July 2025	Guldensporenmeeting	Kortrijk, Belgium		
Triple jump	13.51 m (−0.4 m/s)	Brenda Baar	18 June 2011	European Team Championships 1st League	İzmir, Turkey		
Triple jump	13.51 m (+1.9 m/s)	Kellynsia Leerdam	2 August 2025	Dutch Championships	Hengelo, Netherlands		
Shot put	21.09 m	Jessica Schilder	16 May 2026	Shanghai Diamond League	Shaoxing/Keqiao, China		
Discus throw	70.99 m	Jorinde van Klinken	11 April 2026	Oklahoma Throws Series	Ramona, United States		
Discus throw	71.22 m X	Ria Stalman	15 July 1984		Walnut, United States		
Hammer throw	67.04 m	Lotte Smink	24 May 2026	Int. Sparkassen Hammerwurf-Meeting	Fränkisch-Crumbach, Germany		
Javelin throw	60.92 m	Lisanne Schol	8 June 2019	Gouden Spike	Leiden, Netherlands		
Heptathlon	6867 pts	Anouk Vetter	17–18 July 2022	World Championships	Eugene, United States		
Heptathlon	100m H (wind) / High jump / Shot put / 200m (wind) / Long jump (wind) / Javelin / 800m; 13.30 (+0.7 m/s) / 1.80 m / 16.25 m / 23.73 (+1.4 m/s) / 6.52 m (+0.3 m/s) / 58.29 m / 2:20.09						
5000 m walk (track)	23:52.6	Marica Zethof	22 May 1983		Sittard, Netherlands		
10,000 m walk (track)	50:14.9	Marica Zethof	22 May 1983		Zonhoven, Belgium		
10 km walk (road)	49:46	Marica Onos	10 April 1983		Rotterdam, Netherlands		
20,000 m walk (track)	1:47:36.31	Anne van Andel	25 September 2022		Montreuil, France		
20 km walk (road)	1:50:52	Anne van Andel	11 March 2018	Lugano Trophy	Lugano, Switzerland		
Half marathon walk (road)	2:24.51	Jacqueline van Drongelen	4 October 2026	Dutch Championships Race Walk	Tilburg, Netherlands		
35 km walk (road)	3:40:09	Anne van Andel	1 October 2023		Tilburg, Netherlands		
50 km walk (road)	5:30:11	Anne van Andel	1 October 2017		Tilburg, Netherlands		
4 × 100 m relay	42.02	Netherlands; Nadine Visser; Lieke Klaver; Minke Bisschops; Marije van Hunenstijn	28 June 2025	European Team Championships	Madrid, Spain		
4 × 200 m relay	1:34.8 h	Netherlands; Mieke Sterk; Corrie Bakker; Truus Hennipman; Hilly Gankema	24 August 1968		London, United Kingdom		
Swedish relay	2:10.44	Phanos Amsterdam Club Team; Marjolein de Jong; Martje Hoekmeijer; Angelique Smit; Wendy Visser	19 September 2004		Amstelveen, Netherlands		
4 × 400 m relay	3:19.50	Netherlands; Lieke Klaver; Cathelijn Peeters; Lisanne de Witte; Femke Bol	10 August 2024	Olympic Games	Paris, France		
4 × 800 m relay	8:29.70	Netherlands; Grete Koens; Laura Bosman; Stella Jongmans; Krista Aukema	5 June 1992		Sheffield, United Kingdom		
Ekiden relay	2:22:36	Netherlands; Wilma van Onna / 5 km Carla Beurskens / 10 km Anne van Schuppen / 5 km Jolanda Homminga / 10 km Joke Kleyweg / 5 km Ine Valentin / 7.195 km	25 February 1990		Yokohama, Japan		

=== Mixed ===
Event	Record	Athlete	Date	Meet	Place	Ref.
4 × 100 m relay	40.20 A	Netherlands; Nsikak Ekpo; Minke Bisschops; Xavi Mo-Ajok; Isabel van den Berg	2 May 2026	World Relays	Gaborone, Botswana	
4 × 400 m relay	3:07.43	Netherlands; Eugene Omalla; Lieke Klaver; Isaya Klein Ikkink; Femke Bol	3 August 2024	Olympic Games	Paris, France	

== Indoor ==
=== Men ===
Event	Record	Athlete	Date	Meet	Place	Ref.
50 m	5.85	Marc van de Krogt	16 January 1988		Zwolle, Netherlands	
50 m	5.79+	Brian Mariano	14 February 2012	Meeting Pas de Calais	Liévin, France	
60 m	6.51	Taymir Burnet	21 February 2026	Invitatiewedstrijd senioren	Apeldoorn, Netherlands	
200 m	20.77	Patrick van Balkom	9 March 2001	World Championships	Lisbon, Portugal	
400 m	45.35	Jonas Phijffers	22 February 2026	Invitatiewedstrijd senioren	Apeldoorn, Netherlands	
800 m	1:44.72	Ryan Clarke	24 January 2026	New Balance Indoor Grand Prix	Boston, United States	
1000 m	2:16.09	Samuel Chapple	15 February 2025	Keely Classic	Birmingham, United Kingdom	
1500 m	3:32.68	Samuel Chapple	22 February 2026	Copernicus Cup	Toruń, Poland	
Mile	3:52.70	Stefan Nillessen	13 February 2025	Meeting Hauts-de-France Pas-de-Calais	Liévin, France	
3000 m	7:29.49	Niels Laros	13 February 2025	Meeting Hauts-de-France Pas-de-Calais	Liévin, France	
5000 m	13:08.60	Mike Foppen	26 January 2024	BU John Thomas Terrier Classic	Boston, United States	
50 m hurdles	6.63	Marcel van der Westen	25 January 2003		Zuidbroek, Netherlands	
60 m hurdles	7.52	Gregory Sedoc	7 February 2009		Stuttgart, Germany	
60 m hurdles	7.52	Gregory Sedoc	13 February 2009	PSD-Bank Meeting	Düsseldorf, Germany	
400 m hurdles	50.88	Jesper Arts	26 January 2014		Bordeaux, France	
High jump	2.31 m (Note: outdoor mark ratified as absolute record)	Wilbert Pennings	9 February 2002		Siegen, Germany	
High jump	2.31 m (Note: outdoor mark ratified as absolute record)	Douwe Amels	5 March 2023	European Championships	Istanbul, Turkey	
Pole vault	5.96 m	Menno Vloon	27 February 2021	All Star Peche	Clermont-Ferrand, France	
Long jump	8.23 m	Emiel Mellaard	5 February 1989		The Hague, Netherlands	
Triple jump	16.69 m	Fabian Florant	1 March 2013		Gothenburg, Sweden	
Triple jump	16.75 m X	Fabian Florant	27 January 2012	Carthage Tadd Metzger Invitational	Kenosha, United States	
Triple jump	16.75 m X	Fabian Florant	11 February 2012		Fayetteville, United States	
Triple jump	16.73 m X	Fabian Florant	9 February 2013		Fayetteville, United States	
Shot put	20.89 m	Rutger Smith	16 February 2008		Ghent, Belgium	
Weight throw	23.71 m	Denzel Comenentia	24 February 2018	SEC Championships	College Station, United States	
Discus throw	62.42 m	Erik Cadée	12 March 2011	4th World Indoor Throwing Competition	Växjö, Sweden	
Javelin throw	55.81 m	Hille Groendijk	10 March 2012	World Indoor Throwing	Växjö, Sweden	
Heptathlon	6372 pts	Eelco Sintnicolaas	2–3 March 2013	European Championships	Gothenburg, Sweden	
Heptathlon	60m / Long jump / Shot put / High jump / 60m H / Pole vault / 1000m; 6.88 / 7.61 m / 14.11 m / 2.02 m / 7.91 / 5.40 m / 2:38.73					
5000 m walk	20:17.42	Harold van Beek	22 February 1997		The Hague, Netherlands	
4 × 200 m relay	1:27.06	Hellas Utrecht; Patrick van Balkom; Patrick Snoek; Eric Roeske; Auke Klarenbeek	2 February 1997		Den Haag, Netherlands	
4 × 400 m relay	3:04.25	Netherlands; Liemarvin Bonevacia; Ramsey Angela; Terrence Agard; Tony van Diepen	3 March 2024	World Championships	Glasgow, United Kingdom	
4 × 800 m relay	7:39.89	Hellas Utrecht Club Team; Jurre Laven; René Mabelis; Michiel Löschner; Sander de Korte	19 January 2002		Zuidbroek, Netherlands	

=== Women ===
Event	Record	Athlete	Date	Meet	Place	Ref.
50 m	6.19	Nelli Cooman	31 January 1987		Ottawa, Canada	
60 m	7.00	Nelli Cooman	23 February 1986	European Championships	Madrid, Spain	
60 m	7.00	Dafne Schippers	13 February 2016	ISTAF Indoor	Berlin, Germany	
200 m	22.64	Femke Bol	3 February 2024	Meeting Metz Moselle Athlélor	Metz, France	
300 m	37.95	Nicky van Leuveren	25 January 2018	Czech Indoor Gala	Ostrava, Czech Republic	
400 m	49.17	Femke Bol	2 March 2024	World Championships	Glasgow, United Kingdom	
500 m	1:05.63	Femke Bol	4 February 2023	New Balance Indoor Grand Prix	Boston, United States	
600 m	1:30.37 A	Sanne Verstegen	25 January 2018	Lobo Collegiate Open	Albuquerque, United States	
800 m	1:59.07	Femke Bol	8 February 2026	Meeting Metz Moselle Athlélor Crédit Mutuel	Metz, France	
1000 m	2:38.72	Sanne Verstegen	18 February 2017	Birmingham Indoor Grand Prix	Birmingham, United Kingdom	
1500 m	4:00.46	Sifan Hassan	19 February 2015	XL Galan	Stockholm, Sweden	
Mile	4:26.39	Amina Maatoug	21 February 2025	Boston University DMR Challenge	Boston, United States	
Mile	4:19.89 (Note: not submitted for ratification)	Sifan Hassan	11 February 2017	Millrose Games	New York City, United States	
3000 m	8:30.76	Sifan Hassan	18 February 2017	Birmingham Indoor Grand Prix	Birmingham, United Kingdom	
Two miles	9:37.75	Adrienne Herzog	20 February 2010	Aviva Indoor Grand Prix	Birmingham, United Kingdom	
5000 m	15:36.76	Bieke Schipperen	14 February 2026	Boston University David Hemery Valentine Invitational	Boston, United States	
50 m hurdles	6.91	Marjan Olyslager	24 January 1987		Zwolle, Netherlands	
50 m hurdles	6.77+	Nadine Visser	13 February 2025	Meeting Hauts-de-France Pas-de-Calais	Liévin, France	
60 m hurdles	7.72	Nadine Visser	7 March 2025	European Championships	Apeldoorn, Netherlands	
High jump	1.96 m	Britt Weerman	3 February 2023		Weinheim, Germany	
High jump	1.96 m	Britt Weerman	11 February 2023	Meeting Metz Moselle Athlelor	Metz, France	
High jump	1.96 m	Britt Weerman	5 March 2023	European Championships	Istanbul, Turkey	
Pole vault	4.60 m	Marijn Kieft	17 January 2026	Klaverblad International Polsstokgala	Zoetermeer, Netherlands	
Long jump	6.70 m	Pauline Hondema	14 February 2025	ISTAF Indoor	Berlin, Germany	
Triple jump	13.21 m	Maureen Herremans	23 January 2022		Liévin, France	
Shot put	20.69 m	Jessica Schilder	9 March 2025	European Championships	Apeldoorn, Netherlands	
Shot put	20.69 m	Jessica Schilder	6 March 2026	ISTAF Indoor	Berlin, Germany	
Discus throw	51.16 m	Corinne Nugter	28 February 2015	World Indoor Throwing	Växjö, Sweden	
Javelin throw	41.83 m	Jolanda Keizer	10 March 2012	World Indoor Throwing	Växjö, Sweden	
Pentathlon	4888 pts	Sofie Dokter	22 March 2026	World Championships	Toruń, Poland	
Pentathlon	60m H / High jump / Shot put / Long jump / 800m; 8.19 / 1.87 m / 13.92 m / 6.52 m / 2:12.27					
3000 m walk	14:18.5 h	Marcia Onos-Zethof	22 January 1983		Goes, Netherlands	
4 × 200 m relay	1:39.44	Eindhoven Atletiek Club Team; Joyce Puts; Zanna Vanterpool; Esther Akihary; Sacha van Agt	25 January 2015		Apeldoorn, Netherlands	
4 × 400 m relay	3:24.34	Netherlands; Lieke Klaver; Nina Franke; Cathelijn Peeters; Femke Bol	9 March 2025	European Championships	Apeldoorn, Netherlands	
4 × 800 m relay	10:54.97	PAC Rotterdam Club Team; Martou Klaver; Monique van der Meer; Lisanne de Witte; Ellen Ruigrok	24 March 1996		The Hague, Netherlands	

=== Mixed ===
Event	Record	Athlete	Date	Meet	Place	Ref.
4 × 400 m relay	3:15.63	Netherlands; Nick Smidt; Eveline Saalberg; Tony van Diepen; Femke Bol	6 March 2025	European Championships	Apeldoorn, Netherlands	
