= Akeem Sirleaf =

Liberian athlete (born 1997)

Personal information
- Born: 10 March 1997 (age 29)

Sport
- Sport: Athletics
- Event: Sprint

Akeem Sirleaf (born 10 March 1997) is a Liberian sprinter. He is the Liberian national record holder in the 200 metres short track, and the 400 metres.

== Biography ==
Sirleaf lived in Philadelphia and North St. Paul, Minnesota, where he started in track and field alongside playing football at running back. A Minnesota Class 2A champion in the 200 metres and a school record holder in the 400 metres, he chose to focus on athletics after finishing high school.

Having attended Butler Community College in El Dorado, Kansas, Sirleaf competed for North Carolina A&T State University in the United States, and in 2019 met the automatic qualifying standards for the 2020 Olympic Games, prior to the delay of the Games to the following year due to Covid-19 pandemic. He set a new Liberian 200 metres national record at the 2019 MEAC Outdoor Track and Field Championships with a time of 20.37 seconds. At the same meet, he broke the Liberian 400 metres national record by running 45.42 seconds, helping his college win the MEAC title in 2019 and competed at the 2019 NCAA Division I Outdoor Track and Field Championships. He was a winner at the 2021 NCAA Outdoor Championships in the men's 4 x 400 metres relay alongside Trevor Stewart, Daniel Stokes and Randolph Ross.

Competing at the 2022 African Championships in Athletics in Mauritius, he was a finalist in the 200 metres, running a time of 21.21 to place sixth overall. He has previously competed at the championships in 2018 without progressing beyond the first round.

Sirleaf ran as part of the Liberian 4 × 100 m relay team which qualified for the 2024 Paris Olympics at the 2024 World Relays Championships in Nassau, Bahamas. Later that year, he also compete for Liberia at the 2024 African Championships in Athletics in Douala, Cameroon.
