= Harold van Beek =

Dutch racewalker

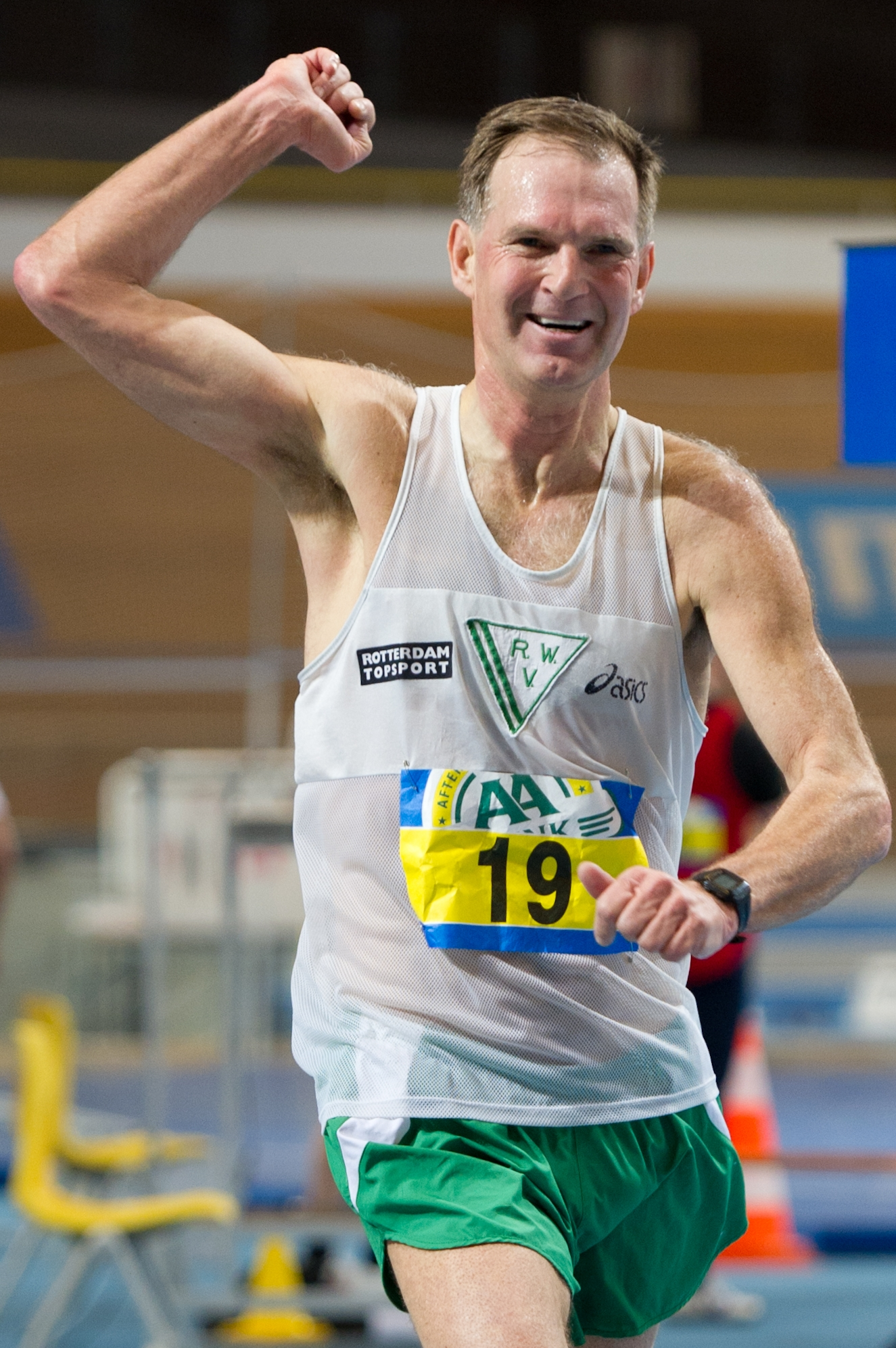
- Harold van Beek in 2011

Personal information
- Nationality: Dutch
- Born: 14 April 1962 (age 64) Eindhoven, Netherlands

Sport
- Sport: Athletics
- Event: Racewalking

Harold van Beek (born 14 April 1962) is a Dutch racewalker. He competed in the men's 50 kilometres walk at the 1992 Summer Olympics, and came in 31st place.
