= Karayme Bartley =

Jamaican sprinter (born 1995)

Personal information
- Born: 10 September 1995 (age 30) Lionel Town, Jamaica

Sport
- Sport: Athletics
- Event: 400 metres
- College team: Texas Tech Red Raiders
Medal record
Men's track and field
Representing Jamaica
World Championships
Silver medal – second place	2022 Eugene	4×400 m relay
NACAC Championships
Silver medal – second place	2022 Freeport	4×400 m relay
Silver medal – second place	2022 Freeport	Mixed 4×400 m relay

Karayme Bartley (born 10 September 1995) is a Jamaican athlete. He competed in the mixed 4 × 400 metres relay event at the 2020 Summer Olympics.

== Biography ==
In 2012, Bartley began his track career as a student at Garvey Maceo High School in Clarendon. The following year, he reached the final at the Inter-Secondary Schools Boys and Girls Championships in Jamaica. In 2015, Bartley earned a scholarship at Iowa Central Community College in the United States. After his graduation from Iowa Central, he attended the University of Iowa, graduating in 2019. In April 2021, Bartley ran a time of 20.42 seconds for the 200 metres, the fastest time by a Jamaican in the season.

After leaving the University of Iowa, Bartley joined the Texas Tech's Sports Performance Center at Texas Tech University. He finished in third place in the Jamaican trials for the 2020 Summer Olympics in the 400 metres, to qualify for the Olympics. Bartley had originally focused on the 200 metres, but an injury changed his focus to the 400 metres instead.

At the 2020 Summer Olympics, Bartley ran in both the men's 4 × 400 metres relay and the mixed 4 × 400 metres relay events.
