= Aoto Suzuki =

Japanese sprinter

Personal information
- Nationality: Japanese
- Born: 30 May 2001 (age 24) Saitama, Japan

Sport
- Sport: Athletics
- Event: 400 metres

Aoto Suzuki (鈴木 碧斗, born 30 May 2001) is a Japanese athlete. He competed in the men's 4 × 400 metres relay event at the 2020 Summer Olympics.
