= Trevor Stewart =

Trevor Stewart may refer to:

- Trevor Stewart (sprinter) (born 1997), American Olympic athlete
- Trevor Stewart (cricketer) (1940–2020), Australian cricketer

== See also ==
- Trevor Stewardson (born 1977), Canadian boxer
