= Randolph Ross =

American sprinter (born 2001)

Personal information
- Born: January 1, 2001 (age 25) Raleigh, North Carolina, U.S.
- Height: 6 ft 1 in (185 cm)

Sport
- Country: United States
- Sport: Track and field
- Event: 400m
- College team: North Carolina A&T Aggies

Achievements and titles
- Personal bests: 200 m: 20.26 (High Point 2022); 400 m: 43.85 (Eugene 2021)
Medal record
Men's athletics
Representing the United States
Olympic Games
Gold medal – first place	2020 Tokyo	4 × 400 m relay

Randolph Duane Ross Jr. (born January 1, 2001) is an American athlete specializing in the 400 metres. He competed collegiately for the North Carolina A&T Aggies. At the 2020 Summer Olympics, he won a gold medal as a member of the United States men's 4x400 metres relay team. He was suspended from competition in 2022 for whereabouts failures related to doping tests.

== Biography ==
Ross is coached by his father Duane Ross, who was an Olympian in the 110 m hurdles.

He attended Garner Magnet High School in Garner, North Carolina. While in high school, in outdoor track, he was a two-time NCHSAA 4A state champion in the 400 m. In indoor track, he was a two-time NCHSAA 4A state champion in the 500 m, and one-time state champion in the 300 m and high jump.

Ross competed in college for the North Carolina A&T Aggies. On February 12, 2021, at the Tiger Paw Invitational in Clemson, South Carolina, Ross ran the 400 m in 45.21 seconds, which was the fastest time in the nation in 2021 at the time. A day later, he ran the 200 m in a time of 20.50 seconds to take over the top spot in the year at that distance as well. Ross finished second to Noah Williams at the NCAA Division I Indoor Track and Field Championships in February 2021. He won the event at the 2021 NCAA Division I Outdoor Track and Field Championships, setting a 2021 world leading time of 43.85 seconds. He was also a winner in the men's 4x400 metres relay alongside Trevor Stewart, Daniel Stokes and Akeem Sirleaf.

Nine days later he qualified for the 400 m at the 2020 Summer Olympics through finishing third at the US Olympic Trials on June 20, 2021. He was part of the United States Olympic gold medal 4×400 metres relay team at the 2020 Summer Olympics.

In 2022, Ross doubled as the indoor and outdoor NCAA champion in the 400 m.

On 16 July 2022, Ross was suspended by the Athletics Integrity Unit and barred from participating in the 2022 World Athletics Championships. In December 2022, he was banned for three years retroactively from July 1, 2022 for whereabouts failures and tampering with doping control, having missed three tests and attempted to doctor an email to avoid the last missed test.

Ross made his return to competition competing indoors in 2026. At his second race back after his suspension, he ran 45.65 seconds for the 400 metres at the Tyson Invitational in Fayetteville, Arkansas.

== Track records ==
As of 19 September 2024, Ross holds the following track records for 400 metres.

Location	Time	Date
Bloomington	44.23	27/05/2022
High Point	44.61	11/05/2022
