= Kaito Kawabata =

Japanese sprinter

Personal information
- Nationality: Japanese
- Born: 17 August 1998 (age 27) Matsusaka, Japan

Sport
- Sport: Athletics
- Event: 400 metres

Achievements and titles
- Personal best: 400 metres: 45.73 (Tokyo 2022)

Kaito Kawabata (川端 魁人, Kawabata Kaitō, born 17 August 1998) is a Japanese athlete who specializes in the 400 metres. He competed in the men's 4 × 400 metres relay event at the 2020 Summer Olympics, equalling the national record.
