= Rikuya Itō =

Japanese sprinter (born 1998)

Personal information
- Nationality: Japanese
- Born: 10 November 1998 (age 27) Funabashi, Japan

Sport
- Sport: Athletics
- Event: 400 metres

Achievements and titles
- Personal best: 400 metres: 45.79 (Kawasaki 2018)

Rikuya Itō (伊東利来也, Itō Rikuya; born 10 November 1998) is a Japanese athlete who specializes in the 400 metres. He competed in the men's 4 × 400 metres relay event at the 2020 Summer Olympics.
