= Terrence Agard =

Dutch sprinter (born 1990)

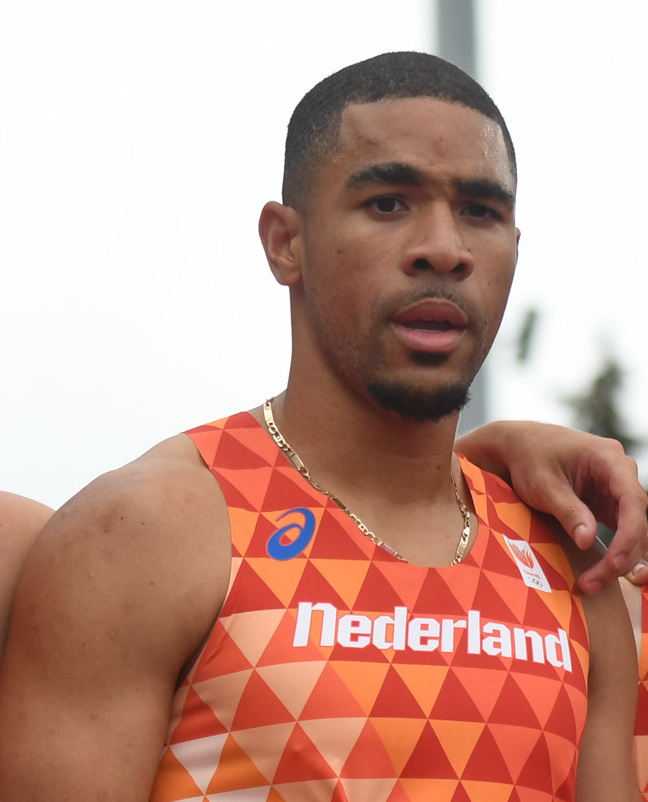
- Agard in 2019 at 29

Personal information
- Born: 16 April 1990 (age 36) Willemstad, Curaçao, Netherlands Antilles
- Height: 1.88 m (6 ft 2 in)
- Weight: 77 kg (170 lb)

Sport
- Sport: Athletics
- Event: 400 metres
- Club: Haag Atletiek
- Coached by: Rana Reider

Achievements and titles
- Highest world ranking: 48 (400m); 1140 (Overall)
Medal record
Men's track and field
Representing Netherlands
Olympic Games
Silver medal – second place	2020 Tokyo	4 × 400 m relay
World Indoor Championships
Bronze medal – third place	2022 Belgrade	4 × 400 m relay
European Championships
Bronze medal – third place	2026 Birmingham	4 × 400 m relay
Bronze medal – third place	2026 Birmingham	4 × 400 m mixed

Terrence Agard (born 16 April 1990 in Willemstad) is a Dutch sprinter specialising in the 400 metres. He represented the Netherlands Antilles until the dissolution of that country in 2010.

== Career ==
In September 2015, he had a car crash while riding with fellow sprinters, Churandy Martina and Hensley Paulina, which left Agard with a broken vertebra in his neck. He returned to competition in April 2016.

Agard was part of the Dutch team which won the silver medal in the 4 × 400 metres relay at the delayed 2020 Tokyo Olympics.

At the 2026 European Championships, he was a member of the Netherlands teams which won bronze medals in the men's 4 × 400 metres relay and mixed 4 × 400 metres relay.

== Personal life ==
He is engaged to Lieke Klaver.

== International competitions ==
Year	Competition	Venue	Position	Event	Notes
Representing the Netherlands Antilles
2006	CARIFTA Games (U17)	Les Abymes, Guadeloupe	10th (h)	800 m	2:06.81
2006	CARIFTA Games (U17)	Les Abymes, Guadeloupe	12th (h)	1500 m	4:44.04
2007	CARIFTA Games (U20)	Providenciales, Turks and Caicos Islands	10th (h)	400 m	50.05
2007	CARIFTA Games (U20)	Providenciales, Turks and Caicos Islands	9th	800 m	2:07.88
2007	World Youth Championships	Ostrava, Czech Republic	38th (h)	400 m	49.99
2008	CARIFTA Games (U20)	Basseterre, Saint Kitts and Nevis	10th (h)	400 m	48.57
2008	CARIFTA Games (U20)	Basseterre, Saint Kitts and Nevis	6th	800 m	1:56.07
2008	NACAC U23 Championships	Toluca, Mexico	17th (h)	200 m	22.90
2009	CARIFTA Games (U20)	Vieux Fort, Saint Lucia	5th	4 × 100 m relay	41.16
2009	CARIFTA Games (U20)	Vieux Fort, Saint Lucia	5th	4 × 400 m relay	3:17.46
2009	Central American and Caribbean Champions	Havana, Cuba	8th	4 × 100 m relay	40.44
2009	Pan American Junior Championships	Port of Spain, Trinidad and Tobago	13th (h)	400 m	48.31
2010	South American Games	Medellín, Colombia	4th	400 m	47.47
Representing the Netherlands
2014	European Championships	Zürich, Switzerland	11th (h)	4 × 400 m relay	3:05.93
2015	European Indoor Championships	Prague, Czech Republic	19th (h)	400 m	47.59
2015	IAAF World Relays	Nassau, Bahamas	–	4 × 400 m relay	DNF
2016	European Championships	Amsterdam, Netherlands	7th	4 × 400 m relay	3:04.52
2017	European Indoor Championships	Belgrade, Serbia	–	400 m	DNF
2019	World Relays	Yokohama, Japan	5th (B)	4 × 400 m relay	3:05.15
2021	Olympic Games	Tokyo, Japan	2nd	4 × 400 m relay	2:57.18
2022	World Indoor Championships	Belgrade, Serbia	3rd	4 × 400 m relay	3:06.90
2022	World Championships	Eugene, United States	9th (h)	4 × 400 m relay	3:03.14
2023	World Championships	Budapest, Hungary	6th	4 × 400 m relay	3:00.40
2024	World Indoor Championships	Glasgow, United Kingdom	3rd	4 × 400 m relay	3:04.25
2024	European Championships	Rome, Italy	9th (h)	4 × 400 m relay	3:03.50
2025	World Championships	Tokyo, Japan	8th	4 × 400 m relay	3:04.84
2026	European Championships	Birmingham, United Kingdom	3rd	4 × 400 m mixed	3:10.77
2026	European Championships	Birmingham, United Kingdom	3rd	4 × 400 m relay	2:59.49

== Personal bests ==
Outdoor

- 200 metres – 20.78 (-0.2 m/s, St-Martin 2015)
- 400 metres – 45.61 (La Chaux-de-Fonds 2019)

Indoor

- 400 metres – 46.77 (Apeldoorn 2015)
