= Sean Bailey (sprinter) =

Jamaican athlete (born 1997)

Personal information
- Nationality: Jamaican
- Born: 15 July 1997 (age 29)

Sport
- Sport: Track and Field
- Event: 400m

Achievements and titles
- Personal best: 400m: 44.43 (2023)
Medal record
Men's track and field
Representing Jamaica
World U20 Championships
| Bronze medal – third place | 2016 Bydgoszcz | 4×400 m relay |

Sean Bailey (born 15 July 1997) is a Jamaican athlete.

== Early life ==
From Spanish Town, Jamaica and a former St Jago High School athlete, Bailey moved on to competing for the University of Texas-El Paso where he made the NCAA 400 metres final in 2021 before injuring his hamstring in the race.

== Career ==
Bailey clocked 45.04 seconds to win the men's 400 metres at the 2021 Jamaican Olympic Trials. He was named in the Jamaican Olympic team for the delayed 2020 Summer Games in Tokyo having qualified through his world ranking. In Tokyo, Bailey participated in the mixed 4 × 400 m relay and finished seventh in the final.

Bailey won the Jamaican men's title again in July 2023, running 44.48 seconds, ahead of Antonio Watson in second and Jevaughn Powell in third.

Bailey was selected for the 2023 World Athletics Championships in Budapest in 2023, where he finished fifth in the final of the 400 metres.

In April 2024, he was selected as part of the Jamiacan team for the 2024 World Athletics Relays in Nassau, Bahamas. He competed at the 2024 Summer Olympics over 400 metres in August 2024.

He reached the final of the 400 metres at the Jamaican Athletics Championships in June 2025.

== Personal life ==
Bailey is the brother of Veronica Campbell-Brown.
