= 2019 AIBA World Boxing Championships – Super heavyweight =

Super heavyweight at the 2019 AIBA World Boxing Championships
- Venue: Ekaterinburg Expo
- Location: Yekaterinburg, Russia
- Dates: 16–21 September
- Competitors: 29 from 29 nations

Medalists
gold medal	Bakhodir Jalolov	Uzbekistan
silver medal	Kamshybek Kunkabayev	Kazakhstan
bronze medal	Maksim Babanin	Russia
bronze medal	Justis Huni	Australia

The Super heavyweight competition at the 2019 AIBA World Boxing Championships was held from 16 to 21 September 2019.

== Schedule ==
The schedule was as follows:

Date	Time	Round
Monday 16 September 2019	20:00	First round
Tuesday 17 September 2019	22:00	Second round
Wednesday 18 September 2019	20:30	Quarterfinals
Friday 20 September 2019	20:30	Semifinals
Saturday 21 September 2019	20:45	Final

All times are Yekaterinburg Time (UTC+5)

== Results ==
=== Finals ===
Semi-finals
(Kazakhstan) Kamshybek Kunkabayev	w/o
(Australia) Justis Huni
(Russia) Maksim Babanin	0
(Uzbekistan) Bakhodir Jalolov	5

Final
(Kazakhstan) Kamshybek Kunkabayev	0
(Uzbekistan) Bakhodir Jalolov	5

=== Top half ===
==== Section 1 ====
First round
(Spain) Ayoub Ghadfa	RSC
(Bulgaria) Petar Belberov
(Italy) Mirko Carbotti	1
(Algeria) Chouaib Bouloudinat	4
(South Korea) Kim Do-hyeon	0
(Germany) Nelvie Tiafack	5

Second round
(Kazakhstan) Kamshybek Kunkabayev	KO
(Spain) Ayoub Ghadfa
(Algeria) Chouaib Bouloudinat	0
(Germany) Nelvie Tiafack	5

Quarterfinals
(Kazakhstan) Kamshybek Kunkabayev	5
(Germany) Nelvie Tiafack	0

==== Section 2 ====
First round
(Egypt) Yousry Hafez	5
(Brazil) Joel Da Silva	0
(China) Bayikewuzi Danabieke	1
(Azerbaijan) Mahammad Abdullayev	4
(Turkey) Muhammed Aydin	0
(Trinidad and Tobago) Nigel Paul	5
(Australia) Justis Huni	5
(Colombia) Cristian Salcedo	0

Second round
(Egypt) Yousry Hafez	2
(Azerbaijan) Mahammad Abdullayev	3
(Trinidad and Tobago) Nigel Paul
(Australia) Justis Huni	RSC

Quarterfinals
(Azerbaijan) Mahammad Abdullayev	0
(Australia) Justis Huni	5

=== Bottom half ===
==== Section 3 ====
First round
(England) Frazer Clarke	5
(Serbia) Vladan Babić	0
(Armenia) Gurgen Hovhannisyan	5
(Austria) Aleksandar Mraović	0
(Grenada) Andy Andall
(Russia) Maksim Babanin	RSC

Second round
(France) Mourad Aliev	1
(England) Frazer Clarke	4
(Armenia) Gurgen Hovhannisyan	0
(Russia) Maksim Babanin	5

Quarterfinals
(England) Frazer Clarke	2
(Russia) Maksim Babanin	3 (Note: The original decision was 3:2 in favour of Clarke. Upon appeal by the Russian Boxing Federation, a bout review jury reviewed the third round and overturned said decision, giving the fight 3:2 to Babanin.)

==== Section 4 ====
First round
(Croatia) Marko Milun	5
(Democratic Republic of the Congo) Jeamie Tshikeva	0
(United States) Richard Torrez	5
(India) Satish Kumar	0
(Ukraine) Tsotne Rogava	4
(Iran) Iman Ramezanpour	1

Second round
(Croatia) Marko Milun
(United States) Richard Torrez	RSC
(Ukraine) Tsotne Rogava	0
(Uzbekistan) Bakhodir Jalolov	5

Quarterfinals
(United States) Richard Torrez
(Uzbekistan) Bakhodir Jalolov	KO
