= Arslanbek Makhmudov =

Russian boxer (born 1989)

Arslanbek Makhmudov Арсланбек Махмудов
Personal information
- Nickname: Lion
- Born: 7 June 1989 (age 37) Mozdok, North Ossetia, Russian SFSR, Soviet Union
- Height: 197 cm (6 ft 6 in)
- Weight: Heavyweight

Boxing career
- Reach: 194 cm (76 in)
- Stance: Orthodox

Boxing record
- Total fights: 24
- Wins: 21
- Win by KO: 19
- Losses: 3

Arslanbek Ruslanovich Makhmudov (Russian: Арсланбек Русланович Махмудов, Kumyk: Arslanbek Mahmut Ruslannı ulanı; born 7 June 1989) is a Russian professional boxer. At regional level, he has held multiple heavyweight championships, including the NABF title from 2019 to 2023, and the NABA title from 2021 to 2022. He holds a notable win over former world heavyweight champion Samuel Peter.

== Early life ==
Arslanbek was born in the town of Mozdok in North Ossetia–Alania (then known simply as North Ossetia) to a Kumyk family. He studied in Russian State University of Physical Education, Sport, Youth and Tourism. In his amateur career he performed for "Dinamo" boxing team based in Moscow, and won the European student championship.

== Professional career ==
=== Early career ===
After relocating to Montreal, Canada, Makhmudov made his professional debut on 8 December 2017, scoring a first-round technical knockout (TKO) victory over Jaime Barajas at the Danforth Music Hall in Toronto.

He scored four stoppage wins in 2018, with TKOs over Christian Larrondo in April; Elder Hernandez in May; and Emilio Zarate in October, followed by a knockout (KO) over Andrew Satterfield in November. With the exception of Zarate, Makhmudov stopped all of these opponents in the first round, while Zarate was finished in the second.

=== Rise up the ranks ===
He then began 2019 with two more TKO victories, including Jason Bergman in January, and then Avery Gibson in March 2019. Following these victories, he fought for his first professional title against Jonathan Rice on 17 May at the Montreal Casino, capturing the vacant WBC Continental Americas heavyweight title via seventh-round TKO; this was his first fight to go beyond the second round. He won his second regional championship, the WBC-NABF heavyweight title, via third-round TKO against Julian Fernandez on 28 September of the same year at the Montreal Casino. The first defence of his WBC-NABF title came against former world champion Samuel Peter on 7 December 2019 at the Bell Centre in Montreal. Makhmudov retained his title via first-round TKO. Makhmudov made his second title defence against Dillon Carman on 10 October 2020. He won the fight by a first-round technical knockout, stopping Carman after just 27 seconds.

On 23 July 2021, Mahmudov faced Pavel Sour in the third defence of his WBC-NABF title, with the vacant WBA-NABA heavyweight title also on the line. He won the fight by a first-round knockout, stopping Sour with a right straight after just 37 seconds. Makhmudov defended the two titles against Erkan Teper on 23 September 2021. He won the fight by a first-round stoppage, as Teper retired from the fight at the end of the round.

Makhmudov successfully defended his WBC-NABF and WBA-NABA titles against the one-time unified heavyweight title challenger Mariusz Wach on 19 February 2022. He won the fight by a sixth-round technical knockout. Makhmudov made another WBC-NABF and WBA-NABA heavyweight title defence against Carlos Takam on 16 September 2022. Aside from the aforementioned titles, the vacant WBC Silver heavyweight title was on the line as well. Makhmudov dropped Takam twice on the way to a unanimous decision victory, his first bout to go the distance.

Makhmudov was expected to defend his two regional titles against the undefeated Raphael Akpejiori on 16 December 2022. Akpejiori withdrew from the bout on 16 November, as his team opted to pursue a different fight instead. Michael Wallisch stepped in as a replacement, whom Makhmudov defeated via 1st-round TKO. He eventually faced Akpejiori 1 July 2023 at Huntington Center, Toledo, defending his WBC–NABF title via second-round TKO in what was Makhmudov's American debut.

==== Makhmudov vs. Kabayel ====
On 28 October 2023, Makhmudov fought on the undercard of Tyson Fury vs. Francis Ngannou in Riyadh, Saudi Arabia, successfully defending his WBC–NABF title for the ninth time by defeating Junior Anthony Wright in the first round, capturing the vacant WBA Inter-Continental heavyweight title as well. Later that year, Makhmudov faced Agit Kabayel at the Day of Reckoning event in Riyadh on 23 December in defence of his two titles. Kabayel, who was also undefeated at 23–0, had previously held the European heavyweight title yet entered as a heavy underdog against the much larger and harder-hitting Makhmudov. Despite this, Makhmudov lost in a shocking upset by fourth-round TKO. The first three rounds saw Makhmudov lunging in with the intention to knock Kabayel out early, constantly missing and throwing himself off balance due to Kabayel's superior footwork, who repeatedly countered Makhmudov with hard shots to the head. The fourth round saw an exhausted Makhmudov fighting off of the backfoot, with Kabayel focusing his attack to the body and dropping Makhmudov three times before the referee waved off the fight. With this loss, Makhmudov dropped to 18–1, losing his regional titles in the process.

=== Career rebuild ===
Following his loss to Kabayel, Makhmudov briefly rebounded with a second-round KO over Miljan Rovcanin on 25 May 2024. However, his next fight that year saw him lose again by TKO, this time against Guido Vianello on 17 August, losing via doctor stoppage in the eighth round due to severe swelling over his left eye.

Almost a year after his loss to Vianello, Makhmudov returned to the ring on 27 June 2025 with a first-round KO over Ricardo Brown.

==== Makhmudov vs. Allen ====
Makhmudov challenged Dave Allen on 11 October 2025 for the WBA Inter-Continental heavyweight title at Sheffield Arena, England. He won via unanimous decision with the judges' scorecards reading 115–111, 117–109 and 116–110, all in his favour, becoming the WBA Inter-Continental champion for the second time in his career. This was Makhmudov's second fight to go the distance and the first to go 12 rounds. He was largely dominant throughout, landing almost at will, though he was unable to drop Allen (who has never been dropped in his career) and appeared to fade in the later frames, absorbing several punches himself while against the ropes and losing two points for excessive holding. Following his win, Makhmudov called out Anthony Joshua.

==== Makhmudov vs. Fury ====
On 28 January 2026, it was announced that Makhmudov would fight former two-time heavyweight world champion Tyson Fury on 11 April 2026 at a venue to be confirmed later in the United Kingdom. It was announced on 12 February 2026, that the fight would take place at Tottenham Hotspur Stadium in London. Makhmudov lost by unanimous decision, with the judges' scorecards reading 120–108 x2 and 119–109 in favour of Fury.

== Professional boxing record ==
24 fights	21 wins	3 losses
By knockout	19	2
By decision	2	1

No.	Result	Record	Opponent	Type	Round, time	Date	Location	Notes
24	Loss	21–3	Tyson Fury	UD	12	11 Apr 2026	Tottenham Hotspur Stadium, London, England	
23	Win	21–2	David Allen	UD	12	11 Oct 2025	Sheffield Arena, Sheffield, England	Won WBA Inter-Continental heavyweight title
22	Win	20–2	Ricardo Brown	TKO	1 (10), 1:57	27 Jun 2025	Videotron Centre, Quebec City, Canada	
21	Loss	19–2	Guido Vianello	TKO	8 (10), 2:58	17 Aug 2024	Videotron Centre, Quebec City, Canada	
20	Win	19–1	Miljan Rovcanin	KO	2 (10), 2:32	25 May 2024	Centre Gervais Auto, Shawinigan, Canada	
19	Loss	18–1	Agit Kabayel	TKO	4 (12), 2:03	23 Dec 2023	Kingdom Arena, Riyadh, Saudi Arabia	Lost WBC-NABF and WBA Inter-Continental heavyweight titles
18	Win	18–0	Junior Anthony Wright	TKO	1 (10), 1:10	28 Oct 2023	Kingdom Arena, Riyadh, Saudi Arabia	Retained WBC-NABF heavyweight title; Won vacant WBA Inter-Continental heavyweight title
17	Win	17–0	Raphael Akpejiori	TKO	2 (10), 1:43	1 Jul 2023	Huntington Center, Toledo, Ohio, US	Retained WBC-NABF heavyweight title
16	Win	16–0	Michael Wallisch	RTD	1 (10), 3:00	16 Dec 2022	Centre Gervais Auto, Shawinigan, Canada	Retained WBC-NABF and WBA-NABA heavyweight titles
15	Win	15–0	Carlos Takam	UD	10	16 Sep 2022	Montreal Casino, Montreal, Canada	Retained WBC-NABF and WBA-NABA heavyweight titles; Won vacant WBC Silver heavyweight title
14	Win	14–0	Mariusz Wach	TKO	6 (10), 0:39	19 Feb 2022	Montreal Casino, Montreal, Canada	Retained WBC-NABF and WBA-NABA heavyweight titles
13	Win	13–0	Erkan Teper	RTD	1 (10), 3:00	23 Sep 2021	Centre Videotron, Quebec City, Canada	Retained WBC-NABF and WBA-NABA heavyweight titles
12	Win	12–0	Pavel Sour	KO	1 (10), 0:37	23 Jul 2021	Hotel Holiday Inn, Cuernavaca, Mexico	Retained WBC-NABF heavyweight title; Won vacant WBA-NABA heavyweight title
11	Win	11–0	Dillon Carman	TKO	1 (10), 0:27	10 Oct 2020	Centre Gervais Auto, Shawinigan, Canada	Retained WBC-NABF heavyweight title
10	Win	10–0	Samuel Peter	TKO	1 (10), 2:23	7 Dec 2019	Bell Centre, Montreal, Canada	Retained WBC-NABF heavyweight title
9	Win	9–0	Julian Fernandez	TKO	3 (10), 1:19	28 Sep 2019	Montreal Casino, Montreal, Canada	Won vacant WBC-NABF heavyweight title
8	Win	8–0	Jonathan Rice	TKO	7 (10), 0:30	17 May 2019	Montreal Casino, Montreal, Canada	Won vacant WBC Continental Americas heavyweight title
7	Win	7–0	Avery Gibson	TKO	1 (8), 2:31	16 Mar 2019	Montreal Casino, Montreal, Canada	
6	Win	6–0	Jason Bergman	TKO	1 (6), 1:37	26 Jan 2019	Montreal Casino, Montreal, Canada	
5	Win	5–0	Andrew Satterfield	KO	1 (6), 0:35	24 Nov 2018	Le Centre Financiere Sun Life, Rimouski, Canada	
4	Win	4–0	Emilio Ezequiel Zarate	TKO	2 (4), 1:09	13 Oct 2018	Montreal Casino, Montreal, Canada	
3	Win	3–0	Elder Hernandez	TKO	1 (4), 1:07	26 May 2018	Videotron Centre, Quebec City, Canada	
2	Win	2–0	Christian Larrondo	TKO	1 (4), 0:46	7 Apr 2018	Videotron Centre, Quebec City, Canada	
1	Win	1–0	Jaime Barajas	TKO	1 (4), 0:24	9 Dec 2017	Danforth Music Hall, Toronto, Canada	

Sporting positions
Regional boxing titles
Vacant Title last held by Carlos Negrón	WBC Continental Americas heavyweight champion 17 May 2019 – August 2019; Vacated	Vacant Title next held by Frank Sánchez
Vacant Title last held by Shawndell Terell Winters	WBA-NABA heavyweight champion 23 July 2021 – March 2023; Vacated	Vacant Title next held by Anthony Martinez
Vacant Title last held by Joe Joyce	WBC Silver heavyweight champion 16 September 2022 – December 2022; Vacated	Vacant Title next held by Efe Ajagba
Vacant Title last held by Óscar Rivas	WBC-NABF heavyweight champion 28 September 2019 – 23 December 2023	Succeeded by Agit Kabayel
Vacant Title last held by Otto Wallin	WBA Inter-Continental heavyweight champion 28 October 2023 – 23 December 2023	Succeeded by Agit Kabayel
Preceded by David Allen	WBA Inter-Continental heavyweight champion 11 October 2025 – present	Incumbent
