= Oleksandr Usyk vs. Daniel Dubois II =

Boxing match

Undisputed
- Date: 19 July 2025
- Venue: Wembley Stadium, Brent, London, UK
- Title(s) on the line: WBA (Super), WBC, IBF, WBO, IBO and The Ring undisputed heavyweight championship

Tale of the tape
Boxer	Oleksandr Usyk	Daniel Dubois
Nickname	"The Cat"	"Dynamite"
Hometown	Simferopol, Crimea, Ukraine	Greenwich, London, England
Pre-fight record	23–0 (14 KO)	22–2 (21 KO)
Age	38 years, 6 months	27 years, 10 months
Height	6 ft 3 in (191 cm)	6 ft 5 in (196 cm)
Weight	227 1/2 lb (103 kg)	243 1/2 lb (110 kg)
Style	Southpaw	Orthodox
Recognition	WBA (Super), WBC, WBO, IBO, The Ring and TBRB; Heavyweight Champion; The Ring No. 1 ranked pound for pound fighter Former 2-division undisputed champion	IBF; Heavyweight Champion; TBRB; No. 1 Ranked Heavyweight; The Ring; No. 2 Ranked Heavyweight

Result
- Usyk wins via 5th-round KO

Oleksandr Usyk vs. Daniel Dubois II, billed as Undisputed, was a professional boxing match contested on 19 July 2025 at Wembley Stadium, London, between Oleksandr Usyk and Daniel Dubois for the undisputed heavyweight championship. Usyk won via a 5th-round knockout, regaining the undisputed title he first held from May to June 2024, becoming a two-time undisputed heavyweight champion since Muhammad Ali.

The fight was a rematch of their first bout on 26 August 2023 at Stadion Wrocław, Wrocław, Poland, in which Usyk had defeated Dubois via knockout in the 9th round. Due to his performance and record, Usyk was described as the greatest heavyweight boxer of his generation, with comparisons of Usyk to the all-time greatest in the sport, notably Ali.

As a Ukrainian boxer, Usyk's support for the Ukrainian people during the ongoing Russian invasion of Ukraine was a feature of the fight.

== Background ==
=== Route to the fight ===
Usyk's defeat of Tyson Fury on 18 May 2024 meant he became the first undisputed heavyweight champion since Lennox Lewis.

Usyk vacated his IBF title on 25 June 2024, thereby relinquishing his undisputed status, after he elected to fight a rematch against Fury (which he won, on 21 December 2024) rather than face mandatory IBF challenger Dubois.

On 27 April 2025, the rematch between Usyk and Dubois was announced, to be held on 19 July 2025.

Going into the fight, whilst Usyk was still seen as the favourite due to his record, some analysts gave Dubois a chance, or even predicted a win, on the basis of Usyk's advancing age and Dubois' impressive record since their first bout. After his first defeat to Usyk, Dubois had won three fights in a row, all by knockout, including a knockout victory over Anthony Joshua to retain the IBF belt.

=== Venue ===
The venue was revealed when the fight was announced. Wembley Stadium in north London is the national stadium of England.

This was the first undisputed heavyweight bout to take place in the United Kingdom since Tommy Burns vs. Jem Roche in March 1908, 117 years earlier.

With Dubois being British and Usyk calling the UK his second home, both fighters received a warm reception on their ring walk, before an audience of 90,000.

Heavy rain on the night, ending at 6.30pm, increased humidity in the stadium.

=== Pre-fight buildup ===
In the build up to the fight, Dubois' camp insinuated Usyk had cheated in their first bout, in reference to a controversy over Usyk taking time to recover from what appeared to be a low blow.

On the eve of the fight, ESPN ranked Dubois as one of the top ten greatest ever British heavyweight boxers, with Lewis at No. 1, Fury at 3. and Joshua at 4.

According to Timothy Bradley:

What's driving Usyk right now? It has to be more than just titles; perhaps it's legacy. I'm sure he has heard the critics claiming the Dubois punch that dropped him was legal, not low. Some even go so far as to say Usyk was knocked out and saved by the referee. That kind of talk doesn't sit well with any boxer. I believe Usyk wants to erase any shadow of doubt and silence every critic by making it crystal clear that he's the best heavyweight of this generation.

Usyk weighed in at 227lbs 3oz, the heaviest of his career, although at 243lbs 8oz, Dubois was 16lb heavier.

In addition to the promotional buildup, SNÜ (a nicotine pouch brand) was confirmed as an official sponsor of Usyk vs Dubois II.

== The fight ==
Usyk secured a knockout in the fifth round of a one-sided contest. In the opening round, Usyk showcased a sharp jab, establishing control early in the fight. However, by the second round, Dubois rebounded effectively, gaining a slight advantage. In Round 3, Dubois was briefly rattled by a powerful left hook, but Usyk's intelligent footwork effectively prevented Dubois from finding any opportunities to retaliate. In the fifth round, Usyk first sent Dubois to the canvas with a right hook to the temple. After Dubois returned to his feet, in the next sequence Usyk delivered the decisive knockout with a flush left hook."

After being dropped the second time, Dubois had risen to his knees, but allowed himself to be counted out by referee Mike Griffin. The towel was also thrown in towards the end of the count.

At the time of stoppage, the judges scorecards read 40–36, 39–37 and 39–37, in favour of Usyk. According to CompuBox, Usyk landed 57 of 153 punches thrown (37.3%) and Dubois landed 35 of his 179 thrown (19.6%). The third round was the only time Dubois landed more punches than Usyk.

The BBC reported that "Usyk excelled in all areas – escaping Dubois' attacks with slick footwork, returning with crisp shots on the counter and displaying pure heavyweight power." According to The New York Times, Dubois's strategy of early aggression backfired, with the elite counter-puncher Usyk timing up his opponent as the fight progressed.

According to The Guardian:

Perhaps the best part here was Dubois got to execute his own gameplan, to look sharp, edge a couple of rounds and leave with his reputation if not enhanced then at least preserved, and to do all this while also being violently outmatched. Facing Usyk at this level must feel like being battered off your feet while being simultaneously triple checkmated, thrashed at Cluedo and losing a game of dominos.

== Aftermath ==
=== Reception ===
The victory over Dubois made Usyk a two-time undisputed heavyweight champion, after Muhammad Ali. According to the BBC, it meant Usyk was now certainly "the standout heavyweight of his generation." According to Sky Sports, the win meant Usyk had now defeated each of his leading rivals in the heavyweight division, Tyson Fury, Anthony Joshua and now Daniel Dubois, twice. This feat, alongside his undefeated and two time undisputed status, made him "best heavyweight of this era". According to Yahoo Sports, the win "rubber-stamped his position as a generational great in the sport.

Addressing the broader issue of where Usyk now ranked amongst the greatest heavyweights of all time, favourable comparisons between Usyk and Ali were made on statistical, record, skill and character grounds. Citing his identical height to Ali, 6 foot 3, plus his versatility, fortitude and bravery, according to Yahoo Sports, Usyk would "prove a handful for any of the best heavyweights who dominated their own decades .... the likes of Ali, Joe Louis, Rocky Marciano, Larry Holmes, George Foreman, Lennox Lewis, Sonny Liston and Joe Frazier now have a new name jostling for position in the all-time standings". Sports Illustrated wrote "Some even hold the opinion that he might even be better than [Ali]. While it's unfair to make such a comparison considering they boxed in different eras, the striking similarity can't be ignored."

CBS Sports believed the fight marked a "turning point in the court of public opinion over whether Usyk is approaching status as one of the top 10 heavyweights in boxing history." With his superior "strategy, ring IQ, footwork and perfect punch placement" he was confounding the critics who had suggested he was too small for this era of "super heavyweights", and so might potentially only win one world title in the division given a favourable opponent, but his "lack of one-punch power would become a detriment".

In The Guardian's view, "Most astonishing of all [Usyk] seems to find with each of these fights new depths of will, control and finishing venom. Rather than being a disadvantage, being the same height, weight and dimensions as Ali is Usyk's "defining super-strength, bringing with it speed, agility, startling power.

According to heavyweightboxer.com, signs of Usyk's advancing age were present in the bout, meaning he had perhaps 2 to 4 fights left before the natural signs of ageing reduced his abilities. This meant that while "in terms of purity of skill, consistency, adaptability, and the ability to outclass world-level heavyweights despite size disadvantages, Usyk is possibly the most impressive technician the division has ever seen.", he still lacked the number of wins and career longevity to be considered the greatest heavyweight ever. It speculated that if he could achieve "at least 5 or 6 more wins over top-20 opponents", he could be talked of as possibly the greatest also based on resume, alongside Ali, Joe Louis, Lennox Lewis, Evander Holyfield, Mike Tyson and Rocky Marciano.

Some Talksport analysts believed the victory over Dubois was the greatest ever performance by Usyk, given his age, and based on the manner of the victory, and that Usyk's standing among the greatest would become even clearer in 20 year's time, as it had done with Lennox Lewis.

=== Future fights ===
Dubois accepted his defeat with good grace, congratulating Usyk, vowing to "rise again", with his promoter stating he probably wouldn't fight again in 2025. According to The Ring, due to his record, Dubois would need only a single fight to build back his confidence, before being matched with another notable name in the division.

Immediately after the fight, Usyk rejected the suggestion he might now retire, naming Tyson Fury, Anthony Joshua, Joseph Parker and Derek Chisora as possible opponents in his next fight.

On 24 July 2025, the WBO officially re-ordered Usyk to make a mandatory defence against interim champion Joseph Parker. Parker's promoter David Higgins hoped the lure of building a "reign" as an undisputed champion would appeal to Usyk, rather than vacating the WBO belt.

In the heavyweight division, if Usyk did not face mandatory challenger Parker, for his next opponent it was suggested a trilogy fight with Tyson Fury would be the most lucrative, although any fight featuring Joshua would be a big event. If rising star Moses Itauma prevailed in his scheduled bout against Dillian Whyte, that would greatly increase interest in a fight between the 20 year old and Usyk.

After the fight, Fury said "Usyk knows there's only one man that can beat him. I've done it twice before and the world knows it. No matter what anyone wants to say, I won those fights."

Outside of the heavyweight division, it was suggested IBF cruiserweight champion Jai Opetaia would be an attractive opponent, but only if the fight could be billed as a clash between the undisputed heavyweight and the undisputed cruiserweight, leaving little time for Opetaia to achieve that goal.

According to Sky Sports:

Usyk has the experience, the mindset, the skillset and the X factor of brilliance to dominate the sport. He's shown no sign of slipping yet. But he is 38 years old. He can't fight forever. Top trainer Dave Coldwell, who's faced Usyk from Tony Bellew's corner, has a simple answer as to what beats Usyk. "Father Time," he said. "That's it."

== Russian invasion of Ukraine ==
Usyk is from Simferopol, the Crimean city annexed by Russia in 2014. Boxing for Ukraine, London was the city in which he won his Olympic gold medal during the 2012 Olympic games.

The Russian invasion of Ukraine began in the months before Usyk's 2022 rematch with Anthony Joshua in Saudi Arabia. According to the BBC, "Usyk has been campaigning for peace in Ukraine since [then] .... and Usyk is still a key part of Ukraine's peace efforts publicly, alongside retired boxers Wladimir and Vitali Klitschko."

On 8 June, in an interview with BBC Sport, Usyk said:

I advise American President Donald Trump to come to Ukraine and live in my house for one week..... Only one week. I will give him my house. Live please in Ukraine and watch what is going on every night.... Every night there are bombs and flights above my house. Bombs, rocket. Every night. It's enough.....Ukrainian people are dying. It's not just military guys, but children, women, grandmothers, grandfathers....For me it's hard. It's my country. I worry about what happens in my country'.

According to The Guardian, as well as being a cherished boxer, Usyk now "carries the gravitas of a Ukrainian statesman", with the pre-fight build up in London seeing Usyk send "loaded messages to Daniel Dubois, Vladimir Putin and Donald Trump."

In the week before the fight, Usyk reiterated his support for the Ukrainian people. In Trafalgar Square he unveiled a replica of a 1967 mosaic by the Ukrainian artist Alla Horska, destroyed in the bombing of Mariupol in 2022, to symbolise the destruction in Ukraine and how the country would be rebuilt. In Pall Mall, a prosthetic limb in the colours of the Ukrainian flag added to the statue of Florence Nightingale, a nurse during the 19th Century Crimean War, symbolised the Ukrainian casualties. Usyk also announced Richard Branson as a donor to the Usyk Foundation.

The yellow and blue of the Ukrainian flag was visible before the fight on Wembley Way, and on spectators and on the big screen in the stadium during the event.

After the fight, reflecting on Usyk's symbolism as a "Ukrainian people’s champion" during a time of war, The Observer suggested: "Usyk is admired, and popular, but his triumph in becoming undisputed champion for a second time last weekend is under-appreciated outside boxing. His strong British ties are also underplayed", concluding that "dialling out on Usyk’s story would be a failure of empathy and understanding of the slaughter in Ukraine."

== Fight card ==
Confirmed bouts:

Weight Class		vs.		Method	Round	Time	Notes
Main Card
Heavyweight	Oleksandr Usyk (c)	def.	Daniel Dubois	KO	5 (12)	1:52
Heavyweight	Lawrence Okolie	def.	Kevin Lerena	UD	10	3:00
Light-Heavyweight	Daniel Lapin	def.	Lewis Edmondson	MD	10	3:00
Heavyweight	Solomon Dacres	def.	Vladyslav Sirenko	UD	10	3:00
Super lightweight	Aadam Hamed	def.	Ezequiel Gregores	PTS	4	3:00
Super lightweight	Lasha Guruli	def.	James Francis	RTD	5 (6)	0:02

== Broadcasting ==
DAZN had exclusive worldwide rights to the fight, as a pay-per-view event.

Preceded by vs. Tyson Fury II	Oleksandr Usyk's bouts 19 July 2025	Succeeded by vs. Rico Verhoeven
Preceded by vs. Anthony Joshua	Daniel Dubois's bouts 19 July 2025	Succeeded by vs. Fabio Wardley
