= Ihor Shevadzutskyi =

Ukrainian boxer (born 1990)

Personal information
- Nickname: Hulk
- Born: 23 March 1990 (age 36) Kryvyi Rih, Ukraine
- Height: 6 ft 3 in (191 cm)
- Weight: Heavyweight

Boxing career
- Stance: Orthodox

Boxing record
- Total fights: 15
- Wins: 12
- Win by KO: 10
- Losses: 3
Medal record
Men's amateur boxing
Ukrainian National Championships
Silver medal – second place	2018 Kharkov	Super-heavyweight
Gold medal – first place	2017 Lvov	Super-heavyweight
Gold medal – first place	2016 Kharkov	Super-heavyweight
Bronze medal – third place	2015 Vinnitsa	Super-heavyweight

Ihor Shevadzutskyi (Ukrainian: Iгор Шевадзуцький; born 23 March 1990) is a Ukrainian professional boxer.

== Amateur career ==
Shevadzutskyi competed in the 2013 and 2014 Ukrainian National Championships, losing on points in the quarterfinals.

Prior to turning professional, Shevadzutskyi competed in the heavyweight division (91+ kg) of the 2013–14 and 2015 World Series of Boxing (WSB), as part of team Ukraine Otamans, winning against Roger Hryniuk (SD), Zhibao Wang and Hamza Beguerni (stoppage), and losing against Maxim Babanin (UD) and Lenier Peró (SD).

Shevadzutskyi competed in the 2015 European Amateur Championships, losing by UD to eventual bronze medalist, Mihai Nistor, in the quarterfinals.

Shevadzutskyi competed in the 2015 Ukrainian National Championships, losing on points in the semifinals. Shevadzutskyi won the 2016 and 2017 Ukrainian National Championships, after defeating Victor Vykhryst and Andriy Gorodetskiy in the finals. Shevadzutskyi competed in the 2018 Ukrainian National Championships, losing on points in the final.

== Professional career ==
Shevadzutskyi faced former world title challenger Kevin Johnson (35–19–1, 19 KOs) at the ECB Boxgym in Hamburg on 13 August 2022, winning on points.

Shevadzutskyi faced Martin Bakole (18–1, 13 KOs) at the G2A Arena, Rzeszów on 22 April 2023, losing by technical knockout in the third round.

Shevadzutskyi faced former two-time world title challenger Kubrat Pulev (30–3, 14 KOs) at the Arena Armeec in Sofia, on 30 March 2024, with vacant the WBA International heavyweight title on the line. Shevadzutskyi stepped up on a week's notice after Pulev's original opponent, WBA 'regular' champion Mahmoud Charr (34–4, 20 KOs), pulled out due to an injured bicep. Pulev weighed 248.5 pounds and Shevadzutskyi weighed 286.5 pounds. Pulev won by unanimous decision, with all three judges scoring the fight 117–111.

Shevadzutskyi faced undefeated Bakhodir Jalolov (14–0, 14 KOs) at the Barys Arena in Astana on 5 April 2025, losing by UD.

== Professional boxing record ==
15 fights	12 wins	3 losses
By knockout	10	1
By decision	2	2

No.	Result	Record	Opponent	Type	Round, time	Date	Location	Notes
15	Loss	12–3	Bakhodir Jalolov	UD	10	5 Apr 2025	Barys Arena, Astana, Kazakhstan	
14	Win	12–2	Jakub Sosinski	KO	2 (6), 0:20	7 Dec 2024	Ballhaus Arena, Aschersleben, Germany	
13	Loss	11–2	Kubrat Pulev	UD	12	30 Mar 2024	Arena Armeec, Sofia, Bulgaria	For vacant WBA International heavyweight title
12	Win	11–1	Edonis Berisha	TKO	4 (6), 0:03	25 Feb 2024	Black Wolves Fight Club, Wiesbaden, Germany	
11	Loss	10–1	Martin Bakole	TKO	3 (10), 0:45	22 Apr 2023	G2A Arena, Rzeszów, Poland	
10	Win	10–0	Kevin Johnson	PTS	8	13 Aug 2022	ECB Boxgym, Hamburg, Germany	
9	Win	9–0	Kamil Sokolowski	UD	6	18 Dec 2021	Ice Palace Terminal, Brovary, Ukraine	
8	Win	8–0	Paata Aduashvili	TKO	2 (8), 2:23	12 Jun 2021	AKKO International, Kyiv, Ukraine	
7	Win	7–0	Ramazi Gogichashvili	TKO	3 (6), 0:08	11 Apr 2021	AKKO International, Kyiv, Ukraine	
6	Win	6–0	Aliaksandr Niakhaichyk	TKO	1 (6), 2:23	6 Mar 2021	AKKO International, Kyiv, Ukraine	
5	Win	5–0	Adnan Deronja	TKO	3 (6), 1:30	3 Oct 2020	Roman Amphitheatre, Plovdiv, Bulgaria	
4	Win	4–0	Igor Pylypenko	TKO	1 (6), 1:24	1 Jul 2020	Club Atlas, Kyiv, Ukraine	
3	Win	3–0	Daniel Robles	RTD	3 (6), 3:00	14 Dec 2019	Kolodruma, Plovdiv, Bulgaria	
2	Win	2–0	Collen Mavhundutse	KO	1 (4)	26 Jul 2019	Thabo Vuyo School, Rouxville, South Africa	
1	Win	1–0	Wikus Ludeke	TKO	1 (4)	23 Jun 2019	Time Square, Pretoria, South Africa	

== World Series of Boxing record ==
5 fights	3 wins	2 losses
By knockout	2	0
By decision	1	2

No.	Result	Record	Opponent	Type	Round, time	Date	Location	Notes
5	Loss	3–2	Lenier Peró	SD	5	24 Apr 2015	Ciudad Deportiva, Havana, Cuba	
4	Win	3–1	Hamza Beguerni	TKO	4 (5), 1:40	10 Apr 2015	Sports Palace, Kiev, Ukraine	
3	Win	2–1	Zhibao Wang	TKO	4 (5), 0:02	20 Mar 2015	Sports Palace, Kyiv, Ukraine	
2	Loss	2–0	Maxim Babanin	UD	5	21 Feb 2015	Sports Palace, Volgograd, Russia	
1	Win	1–0	Roger Hryniuk	SD	5	13 Dec 2014	Lutsk, Ukraine	
