= Bakhodir Jalolov =

Uzbekistani boxer (born 1994)

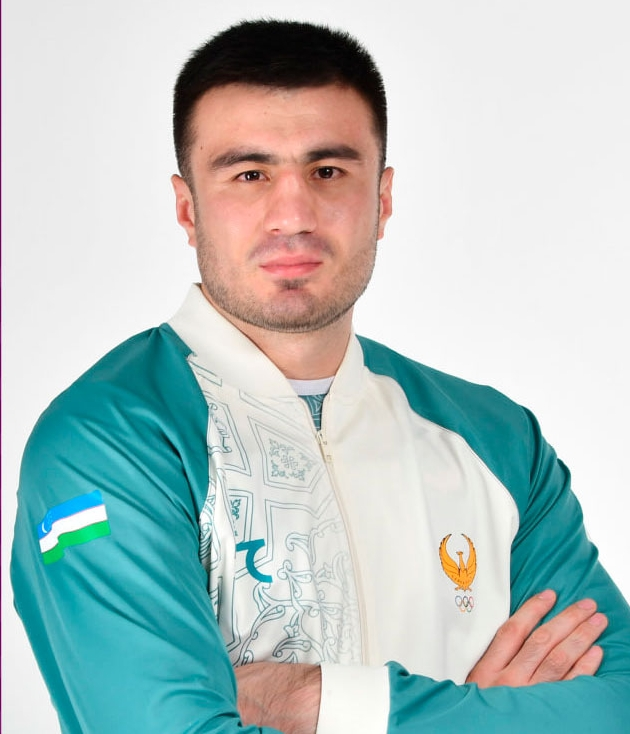
- Jalolov in 2023

Personal information
- Born: 8 July 1994 (age 32) Sariosiyo, Uzbekistan
- Height: 201 cm (6 ft 7 in)
- Weight: Heavyweight

Boxing career
- Reach: 81 in (206 cm)
- Stance: Southpaw

Boxing record
- Total fights: 18
- Wins: 18
- Win by KO: 15
Medal record
Men's boxing
Representing Uzbekistan
Olympic Games
Gold medal – first place	2020 Tokyo	Super-heavyweight
Gold medal – first place	2024 Paris	Super-heavyweight
World Championships
Gold medal – first place	2019 Yekaterinburg	Super heavyweight
Gold medal – first place	2023 Tashkent	Super heavyweight
Bronze medal – third place	2015 Doha	Super heavyweight
Asian Games
Gold medal – first place	2022 Hangzhou	Super heavyweight
Asian Championships
Gold medal – first place	2017 Tashkent	Super heavyweight
Gold medal – first place	2019 Bangkok	Super heavyweight
Gold medal – first place	2021 Dubai	Super heavyweight

Bakhodir Isomiddin oʻgʻli Jalolov (Note: also Dzhalolov) (Uzbek: Bahodir Isomiddin oʻgʻli Jalolov; born 8 July 1994) is an Uzbek professional boxer. As an amateur, he won a bronze medal at the 2015 World Championships, and gold medals at the 2019 World Championships, 2023 World Championships, 2020 Summer Olympics and 2024 Summer Olympics. He also competed at the 2016 Summer Olympics, and acted as Uzbekistan's flag bearer at the 2016 and 2020 Olympic Games.

== Amateur career ==
Jalolov initially intended to play football and his father took him to a sports school to fulfill this ambition at age 11. His father, a former wrestler, encouraged him to take up boxing instead. Jalolov said: "I later realised he wanted me to be a boxer and didn't like football very much". He had struggles early on as a boxer, but was motivated by a desire to "make his father’s dreams come true". Jalolov began boxing competitively in 2010 and by the age of 20 he was unbeaten nationally in the 92 kg category. Jalolov was a member of the Uzbekistan national boxing team coached by Tulkin Kilichev.

=== Asian championships ===
Jalolov took part in the 2017 Asian Amateur Boxing Championships, held in May 2017 in Tashkent, Uzbekistan. He went on a perfect 4–0 run, beating Haipeng Mou and Do Hyeon Kim by technical knockout in the first two rounds, Mohamad Mulayes by technical knockout in the semifinals, and Kamshybek Kunkabayev by majority decision in the finals.

Jalolov went on another perfect run in the 2019 Asian Amateur Boxing Championships, and earned his place in the finals after beating Mohamad Mulayes by unanimous decision in the semifinals. Jalolov faced a familiar opponent in the finals, Kamshybek Kunkabayev, and won the fight by majority decision.

Jalolov took part in the 2021 Asian Amateur Boxing Championships as well, and earned his place in the finals with a technical knockout of Abdulrahman Alanzi in the semifinals. He faced Kamshybek Kunkabayev in the tournament finals, and once again prevailed against Kunkabayev, winning by unanimous decision.

=== World championships ===
Bakhodir Jalolov participated in the 2015 AIBA World Boxing Championships, held in Doha, Qatar in October 2015. He earned his place in the semifinals with decision wins against Mohamed Grimes, Lenier Pero and Hussein Iashaish. Jalolov lost his semifinal bout against Ivan Dychko by split decision.

After an unsuccessful run in the 2017 AIBA World Boxing Championships, where he was eliminated in the second round by Kamshybek Kunkabayev, Jalolov next found success in the 2019 AIBA World Boxing Championships. After beating Tsotne Rogava by decision in the first round, Richard Torrez by knockout in the second round and Maxim Babanin by decision in the semifinals. Jalolov faced Kamshybek Kunkabayev in the finals and beat him by unanimous decision.

=== Olympic Games ===
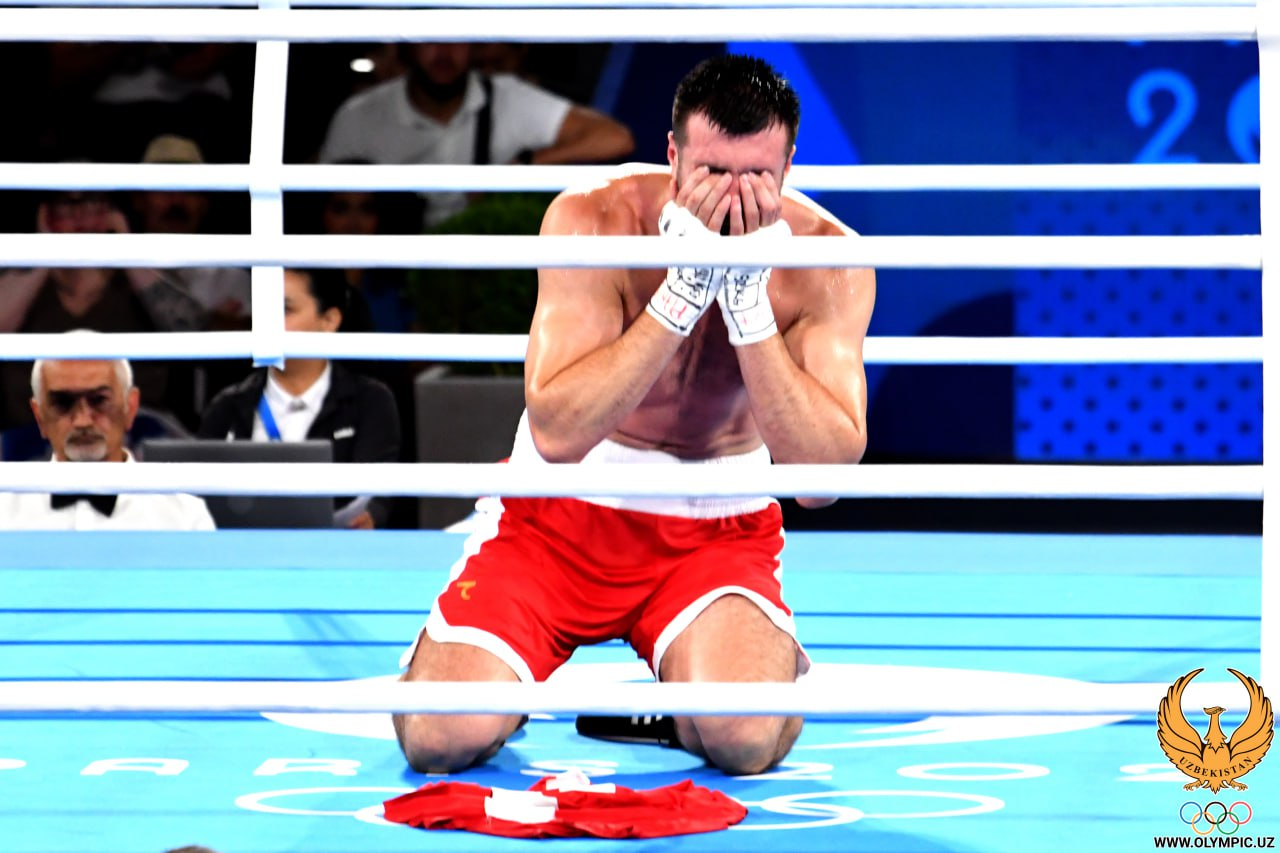
Jalolov places his jersey in the middle of the ring after winning the gold medal at the 2024 Summer Olympics, symbolizing his retirement from Olympic boxing.

Jalolov reached quarterfinals at the 2016 Summer Olympics, where he lost to the eventual silver medalist Joe Joyce. He qualified for the 2020 Summer Olympics in 2021 as a professional and was set to face Mahammad Abdullayev in the first round of the super heavyweight tournament. He thoroughly outboxed Abdullayev over three rounds and scored a standing eight count in round two, although he was unable to finish his opponent. Jalolov advanced to the tournament quarterfinals, where he faced Satish Kumar, whom he beat by unanimous decision. Advancing to the semifinals, Jalolov fought Frazer Clarke. Although Clarke was able to force a standing count, the fight was stopped in the third round due to a previously sustained cut above his eye which widened throughout his bout with Jalolov. Jalolov earned the gold medal after defeating Richard Torrez by unanimous decision in the final of the super heavyweight tournament.

In 2024, Jalolov qualified for his third Olympics, and second as a professional, where he won all his fights by unanimous decision and won gold medal for the second time in the Olympics. After the completion of the Olympic Games, Jalolov made a statement on his Instagram page about retiring from Olympic boxing. Now he will continue his career solely in professional boxing.

== Professional career ==
Jalolov made his professional debut against Hugo Trujillo on 5 May 2018. He won the fight by a third-round technical knockout. Jalolov scored another stoppage victory four months later, on 29 September 2018, when he knocked Eduardo Vitela out in the first round. Jalolov was next scheduled to face Tyrell Wright at the Madison Square Garden on 27 October 2018. He won the fight by stoppage, after Wright retired from the fight at the end of the fourth round. Jalolov was scheduled to fight Marquis Valentine on 8 December 2018, in his last fight of the year. He scored the second first-round stoppage of his professional career, knocking Valentine out at the 2:29 minute mark of the opening round.

Jalolov was next scheduled to face Willie Harvey on 15 March 2019. He won the fight by a second-round technical knockout. Jalolov fought for his first professional title on 10 April 2019, when he took on Brendan Barrett for the vacant WBC-NABF Junior heavyweight title. He won the fight by a first-round knockout.

Jalolov returned on 12 December 2020, to fight Wilfredo Leal. Leal retired from the bout at the end of the first round. Jalolov fought in his native Uzbekistan on 3 April 2021, when he was scheduled to fight Kristaps Zutis. He beat Zutis by a second-round technical knockout. Jalolov knocked out Kamil Sokolowski in the fifth round on 18 March 2022.

Jalolov returned to the United States to face Jack Mulowayi on 10 June 2022. He won the fight by an eight-round knockout, flooring Mulowayi with a left hook. Jalolov knocked his opponent down with a left hook in the sixth round as well, and was deducted a point in the fourth round for excessive holding.

Jalolov faced the veteran Curtis Harper on 26 November 2022. He won the fight by a fourth-round knockout, after having knocked Harper down twice prior to the stoppage.

On 26 August 2023, he knocked out Onorede Ehwareme in the first round at Hard Rock Hotel & Casino in Tulsa, Oklahoma, United States. Jalolov followed this with another first round knockout win over Chris Thompson at Humo Arena in Tashkent, Uzbekistan on 17 November 2023.

Jalolov faced Ihor Shevadzutskyi in a 10-round heavyweight bout on 5 April 2025 in Astana, Kazakhstan. He was taken the distance for the first time in his professional career but won by unanimous decision.

On 6 October 2025 at KSK Arena in Saint Petersburg, Russia, he defeated Vitaly Kudukhov via unanimous decision. Next Jalolov faced Agron Smakici at Co-op Live in Manchester, England, on 9 May 2026, winning when his opponent retired at the end of the seventh round.

At The O2 Arena in London, England, on 17 October 2026, Jalolov defeated Solomon Dacres over 10 rounds by unanimous decision.

== Professional boxing record ==
18 fights	18 wins	0 losses
By knockout	15	0
By decision	3	0

No.	Result	Record	Opponent	Type	Round, time	Date	Location	Notes
18	Win	18–0	Solomon Dacres	UD	10	17 Oct 2026	The O2 Arena, London, England	
17	Win	17–0	Agron Smakici	RTD	7 (10), 3:00	9 May 2026	Co-op Live, Manchester, England	
16	Win	16–0	Vitaly Kudukhov	UD	8	6 Oct 2025	KSK Arena, Saint Petersburg, Russia	
15	Win	15–0	Ihor Shevadzutskyi	UD	10	5 Apr 2025	Barys Arena, Astana, Kazakhstan	
14	Win	14–0	Chris Thompson	KO	1 (10), 1:10	17 Nov 2023	Humo Arena, Tashkent, Uzbekistan	
13	Win	13–0	Onorede Ehwareme	KO	1 (8), 2:14	26 Aug 2023	Hard Rock Hotel & Casino, Tulsa, Oklahoma, U.S.	
12	Win	12–0	Curtis Harper	KO	4 (10), 1:53	26 Nov 2022	Dignity Health Sports Park, Carson, California, U.S.	
11	Win	11–0	Jack Mulowayi	KO	8 (8), 1:20	10 Jun 2022	Turning Stone Resort & Casino, Verona, New York, U.S.	
10	Win	10–0	Kamil Sokołowski	TKO	5 (8), 1:17	18 Mar 2022	Aviation Club Tennis Centre, Dubai, United Arab Emirates	
9	Win	9–0	Julio Cesar Calimeno	TKO	1 (6), 0:46	11 Dec 2021	Coca-Cola Arena, Dubai, United Arab Emirates	
8	Win	8–0	Kristaps Zutis	TKO	2 (6), 1:16	3 Apr 2021	Humo Arena, Tashkent, Uzbekistan	
7	Win	7–0	Wilfredo Leal	RTD	1 (6), 3:00	12 Dec 2020	Salon CTM, San Luis Rio Colorado, Mexico	
6	Win	6–0	Brendan Barrett	KO	1 (6), 2:45	10 Apr 2019	Sony Hall, New York City, New York, U.S.	Won vacant WBC-NABF Junior heavyweight title
5	Win	5–0	Willie Harvey	TKO	2 (6), 1:11	15 Mar 2019	Marconi Automotive Museum, Tustin, California, U.S.	
4	Win	4–0	Marquis Valentine	KO	1 (4), 2:29	8 Dec 2018	Industry Hills Expo Center, La Puente, California, U.S.	
3	Win	3–0	Tyrell Wright	RTD	4 (6), 3:00	27 Oct 2018	Hulu Theater, New York City, New York, U.S.	
2	Win	2–0	Eduardo Vitela	KO	1 (6), 0:47	29 Sep 2018	Kings Theatre, New York City, New York, U.S.	
1	Win	1–0	Hugo Trujillo	TKO	3 (6), 1:14	5 May 2018	Foxwoods Resort Casino, Mashantucket, Connecticut, U.S.	

== Notes ==
Summer Olympics
Preceded by Elshod Rasulov	Flagbearer for Uzbekistan; Rio de Janeiro 2016 Tokyo 2020; With: Nigora Tursunkulova	Succeeded by Incumbent
