= Tyson Fury vs. Francis Ngannou =

Boxing competition

Battle of the Baddest
- Date: 28 October 2023
- Venue: Kingdom Arena, Riyadh, Saudi Arabia

Tale of the tape
Boxer	Tyson Fury	Francis Ngannou
Nickname	The Gypsy King	The Predator
Hometown	Manchester, England	Batié, Hauts-Plateaux, Cameroon
Pre-fight record	33–0–1 (24 KO)	0–0 (Boxing); 17–3 (12 KO) (MMA)
Age	35 years, 2 months	37 years, 1 month
Height	6 ft 9 in (206 cm)	6 ft 4 in (193 cm)
Weight	277.7 lb (126 kg)	272.1 lb (123 kg)
Style	Orthodox	Orthodox
Recognition	WBC; Heavyweight Champion; The Ring/TBRB; No. 1 Ranked Heavyweight	Former UFC Heavyweight Champion

Result
- Fury wins via 10-round split decision (94–95, 96–93, 95–94)

Tyson Fury vs. Francis Ngannou, billed as Battle of the Baddest, was a professional crossover boxing match between reigning WBC heavyweight champion Tyson Fury and former UFC Heavyweight Champion Francis Ngannou, that took place on 28 October 2023 in Riyadh, Saudi Arabia. The British Boxing Board of Control was the host commission for the event.

== Background ==
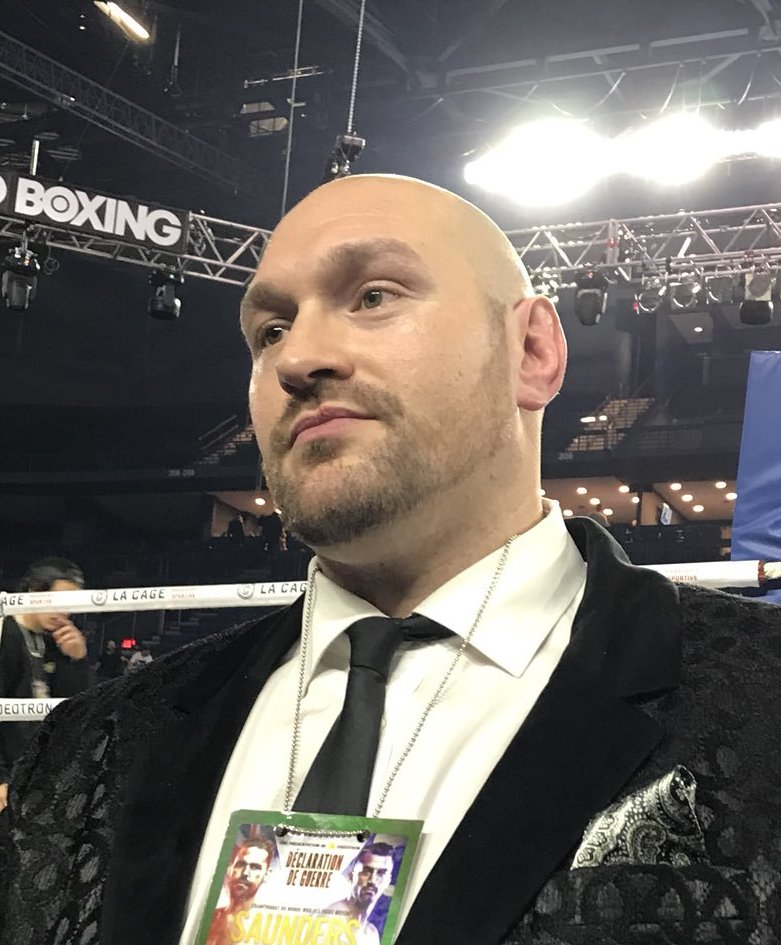
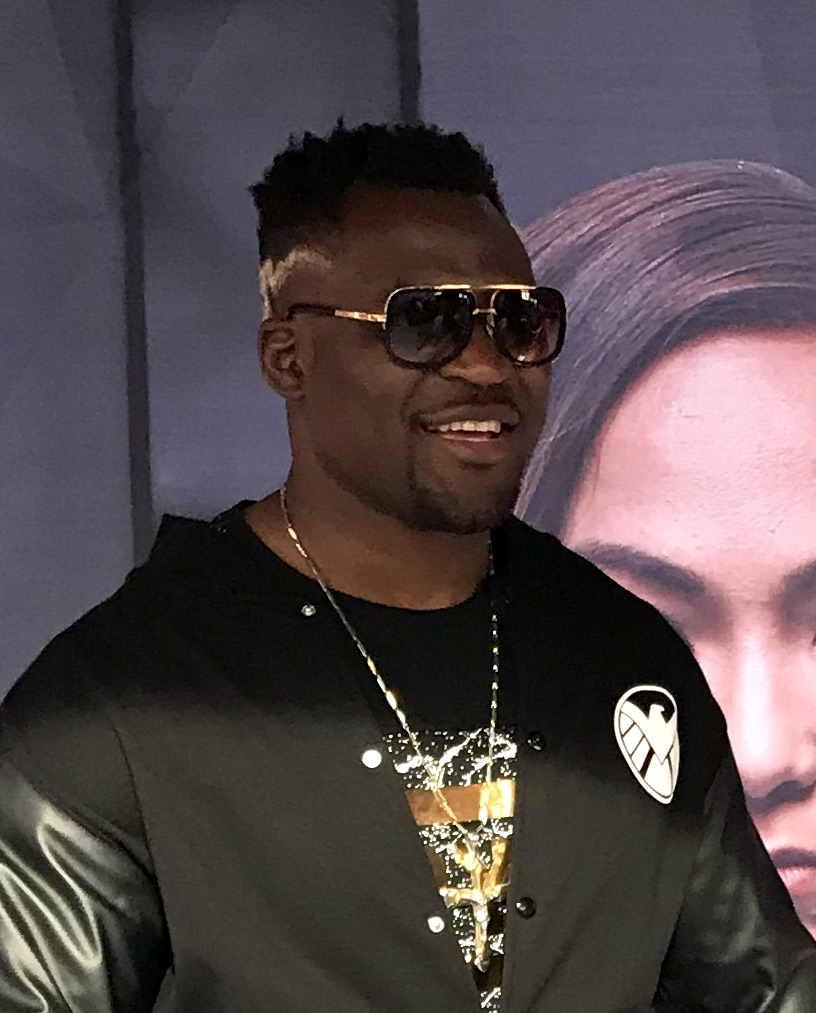
Tyson Fury (left) and Francis Ngannou (right)

Prior to winning the UFC heavyweight title, Ngannou had long expressed an interest in moving to boxing, specifically facing Fury or former WBC heavyweight champion Deontay Wilder. Following Fury's victory against Dillian Whyte in April 2022, Ngannou entered the ring and the pair put forth a suggestion for a bout against one another. Ngannou left the UFC in January 2023 following a year-long contract dispute. One of his main gripes was the UFC's denying of his insistence of a right to box in his contract. Ngannou later signed with the PFL, which would allow him to box.

A professional bout between Fury and Ngannou was announced on 11 July 2023, to take place in Saudi Arabia. WBC president Mauricio Sulaiman confirmed that Fury would not be stripped of his title and that the organisation had given him special permission to compete.

Prize money for the bout, not including earnings from Pay Per View, was estimated at US$10 million for Ngannou and US$50 million for Fury.

== The fight ==
The fight was close and competitive throughout with both of them switching stances multiple times. Fury was knocked down from a left hook in the 3rd round. Nevertheless he survived to win a somewhat controversial split decision. Ngannou attempted a superman punch in the final round.

== Aftermath ==
This ended with a controversial decision that gave Fury the win. Fury would later agree to an undisputed showdown with Oleksandr Usyk set for 17 February 2024 (later pushed back to May). Ngannou would next face former heavyweight champion Anthony Joshua, who stopped him inside two rounds. Of the fight between Fury and Ngannou, Usyk suggested that Fury did not take it seriously.

== Undercard ==
The undercard featured six bouts of which the primary fight on the undercard was Fabio Wardley and David Adeleye, for the WBO European, WBA Continental, Commonwealth, and British heavyweight titles. At the pre-fight press conference on 23 October 2023, there was what was described by Sky Sports as a "scuffle on the red carpet".

Other fights on the card were a bout for the IBF and WBO Inter-Continental heavyweight titles between former WBO heavyweight champion Joseph Parker against Simon Kean both have previously defeated Daniel Martz and Shawndell Winters. The bout is billed as 'Worlds Apart'. Carlos Takam vs Martin Bakole, this bout was first suggested after Takam defeated Tony Yoka on 11 March 2023, where he used his post-match press conference to call for a bout between himself and Bakole. The bout was later confirmed on 1 October 2023 and billed as 'African Rule'. A North American Boxing Federation (NABF) heavyweight title fight between Arslanbek Makhmudov and Junior Anthony Wright was announced after Makhmudov's original opponent Agron Smakici withdrew for undisclosed reasons and was replaced by Wright. It was later announced that the vacant WBA Inter-Continental heavyweight title would also be on the line. Moses Itauma vs István Bernáth was a late addition to the fight card less than one month after Itauma fought on the Joe Joyce vs Zhilei Zhang rematch undercard. The only non-heavyweight fight on the card was Jack McGann vs Alcibiade Duran, which took place at super welterweight.

== Fight card ==
Weight Class		vs.		Method	Round	Time	Notes
Main Card
Heavyweight	(United Kingdom) Tyson Fury	def.	(Cameroon) Francis Ngannou	SD	10		^{Note 1} ^{Note 2}
Heavyweight	(United Kingdom) Fabio Wardley	def.	(United Kingdom) David Adeleye	TKO	7 (12)	2:43	^{Note 3}
Heavyweight	(New Zealand) Joseph Parker	def.	(Canada) Simon Kean	KO	3 (10)	2:04	^{Note 4}
Heavyweight	(Russia) Arslanbek Makhmudov	def.	(United States) Junior Anthony Wright Jr.	TKO	1 (10)	1:10	^{Note 5}
Heavyweight	(United Kingdom) Moses Itauma	def.	(Hungary) István Bernáth	TKO	1 (6)	1:53
Heavyweight	(Democratic Republic of the Congo) Martin Bakole	def.	(France) Carlos Takam	TKO	4 (10)	2:15
Preliminary Card
Super welterweight	(United Kingdom) Jack McGann	def.	(United States) Alcibiade Duran	TKO	2 (8)	0:37

^Note 1 WBC Commemorative Riyadh title.
^Note 2 Ngannou's professional boxing debut.
^Note 3 For WBO European, WBA Continental, Commonwealth, and British heavyweight titles.
^Note 4 For IBF and WBO Inter-Continental heavyweight titles.
^Note 5 For WBA Inter-Continental and NABF heavyweight titles.

== Broadcasting ==
Country/Region	Broadcasters	
Country/Region	PPV	Stream
MENA (inc. Saudi Arabia as host)	Webook	
United Kingdom	TNT Sports Box Office	
Ireland	TNT Sports Box Office	
Unsold markets	DAZN	
Australia	Main Event	
Australia	Kayo Sports	
Brunei	Astro Box Office	Astro GO
Malaysia	Astro Box Office	Astro GO
Canada		TSN+
United States	ESPN+	

== See also ==
- Floyd Mayweather Jr. vs. Conor McGregor
- Anthony Joshua vs. Francis Ngannou
- Riyadh Season

Preceded by vs. Derek Chisora III	Tyson Fury's bouts 28 October 2023	Succeeded by vs. Oleksandr Usyk
Debut	Francis Ngannou's bouts 28 October 2023	Succeeded by vs. Anthony Joshua
