= Tyson Fury vs. Arslanbek Makhmudov =

2026 professional boxing match in London

- Date: 11 April 2026
- Venue: Tottenham Hotspur Stadium, London, England

Tale of the tape
Boxer	Tyson Fury	Arslanbek Makhmudov
Nickname	The Gypsy King	Lion
Hometown	Manchester, England	Mozdok, Russia
Pre-fight record	34–2–1 (24 KOs)	21–2 (19 KOs)
Age	37 years, 7 months	36 years, 10 months
Height	6 ft 9 in (206 cm)	6 ft 5.5 in (197 cm)
Weight	122 kg (269 lb)	119.7 kg (264 lb)
Style	Orthodox	Orthodox

Result
- Fury wins via unanimous decision (120–108, 120–108, 119–109)

Tyson Fury vs. Arslanbek Makhmudov, billed as The Comeback, was a professional boxing match contested between former two-time heavyweight world champion Tyson Fury and Arslanbek Makhmudov. Fury won by unanimous decision.

The fight, which streamed live on Netflix, was co-promoted by Gold Star Promotions, Frank Warren, and Zuffa Boxing and its parent company Sela, in partnership with The Ring magazine. The fight's co-main event saw Conor Benn's Zuffa Boxing debut, defeating Regis Prograis by unanimous decision.

== Reception ==
Netflix reported that the fight garnered an average minute audience (AMA) of 5 million viewers in the UK alone.

Turki Al-Sheikh confirmed the attendance was 64,500 for the event. This was an increase for Fury, after his last fight at the stadium for his 2022 bout against Derek Chisora which drew 59,789 fans.

== Card ==
Weight class		vs		Method	Round	Time	Notes	Ref
Main Card (PPV)
Heavyweight	Tyson Fury	def.	Arslanbek Makhmudov	UD	12
Welterweight	Conor Benn	def.	Regis Prograis	UD	10
Heavyweight	Richard Riakporhe	def.	Jeamie Tshikeva	TKO	5/12	2:12	^{Note 1}
Heavyweight	Justis Huni	def.	Frazer Clarke	MD	10
Preliminary Card
Super Lightweight	Breyon Gorham	def.	Eduardo Costa	KO	5/6	1:51
Flyweight	Mikie Tallon	def.	Leandro Blanc	KO	1/6	2:53
Super Middleweight	Pawel August	def.	Simon Zachenhuber	UD	6
Middleweight	Felix Cash	def.	Liam O'Hare	KO	2/8	0:22
Super Featherweight	Sultan Al-Mohamed	def.	Hector Avila Lozano	TKO	3/4	2:46
Welterweight	Elliot Whale	def.	Tom Hill	TKO	4/6	2:39
Heavyweight	Francic Gorman	def.	Ryan Labourn	PTS	4

^Note 1 For British heavyweight title

== Broadcasting ==
Country	Broadcaster
Worldwide	Netflix
United Kingdom	Netflix
