= Kacper Meyna =

Polish boxer

Personal information
- Nationality: Polish
- Born: 10 June 1999 (age 27) Koscierzyna, Poland
- Height: 6 ft 1½ in
- Weight: Heavyweight

Boxing career
- Stance: Orthodox

Boxing record
- Total fights: 19
- Wins: 18
- Win by KO: 11
- Losses: 1

Kacper Meyna is a Polish professional boxer. As of 12 July 2024 he is rated as Poland's number 1 Heavyweight by Boxrec.

== Professional career ==
Meyna claimed the first title of his career in 2023 when he stopped Krzysztof Twardowski for the WBC Francophone belt. Meyna followed this up by with biggest win of his career, stopping former contender and fellow countryman Adam Kownacki in the first round.

Over a year later, Meyna would face off against countryman veteran Mariusz Wach for the vacant WBC Baltic Sea and Republic of Poland heavyweight titles. Meyna would win the fight via Unanimous Decision after 10 rounds.

== Professional boxing record ==
19 fights	18 wins	1 loss
By knockout	11	0
By decision	7	1

No.	Result	Record	Opponent	Type	Round, time	Date	Location	Notes
18	Win	18–1	Victor Emilio Ramírez	UD	10 (10)	3 Oct 2026	Hala Sportowa, Koszalin , Poland	Won WBA Continental heavyweight title
18	Win	17–1	Junior Anthony Wright	KO	1 (10), 1:14	25 Apr 2026	Hala Sportowa Sokolnia, Kościerzyna, Poland	Won vacant Republic of Poland International heavyweight title
17	Win	16–1	Maciej Smokowski	KO	1 (10), 1:28	13 Dec 2025	Hala Stulecia, Sopot, Poland	Retained WBC Baltic and Republic of Poland heavyweight titles
16	Win	15–1	Luis Jose Marin Garcia	UD	6	7 Jun 2025	Universum Gym, Hamburg, Germany	
15	Win	14–1	Mariusz Wach	UD	10	12 Apr 2025	Hala Stulecia, Sopot, Poland	Won vacant WBC Baltic and Republic of Poland heavyweight titles
14	Win	13–1	Pavel Sour	TKO	1 (8), 2:17	8 Jun 2024	Regionalne Centrum Turystyki i Sportu, Karlino, Poland	
13	Win	12–1	Adam Kownacki	TKO	1 (10), 0:45	2 Mar 2024	Hala Widowiskowo-Sportowa, Koszalin, Poland	Won vacant Republic of Poland heavyweight title
12	Win	11–1	Krzysztof Twardowski	TKO	9 (10), 1:30	2 Jun 2023	Hala Sportowa, Zukowo, Poland	Won WBC Francophone heavyweight title
11	Win	10–1	Jakub Sosinski	TKO	1(10), 2:34	11 Feb 2023	Hala Widowisko-Sportowa, Stezyca, Poland	Won vacant Republic of Poland heavyweight title
10	Win	9–1	Michal Banbula	RTD	3 (8), 3:00	1 Oct 2022	Regionalne Centrum Turystyki i Sportu, Karlino, Poland	
9	Win	8–1	Jacek Krzysztof Piatek	KO	1 (10), 2:46	19 Mar 2022	Hala Widowisko-Sportowa, Stezyca, Poland	Won vacant Republic of Poland heavyweight title
8	Win	7–1	Tamaz Zadishvili	TKO	2 (6), 0:48	10 Dec 2021	Hala Sportowa, Zukowo, Poland	
7	Win	6–1	Michal Banbula	UD	8	2 Oct 2021	Hala Sportowa Sokolnia, Koscierzyna, Poland	
6	Loss	5–1	Mateusz Cielepala	UD	8	30 May 2021	Hala Widowisko-Sportowa, Stezyca, Poland	
5	Win	5–0	Zoltan Csala	TKO	3 (6), 0:22	02 Oct 2020	Hala Sportowo - Widowiskowa, Wielki Klincz, Poland	
4	Win	4–0	Andras Csomor	TKO	3 (6), 1:55	29 Feb 2020	Stezyca, Poland	
3	Win	3–0	Pawel Sowik	UD	6	14 Dec 2019	Hala Sportowa Sokolnia, Koscierzyna, Poland	
2	Win	2–0	Mateusz Rybarski	UD	4	31 Aug 2019	Zalew Karczunek, Kaluszyn, Poland	
1	Win	1–0	Krystian Arndt	UD	4	10 May 2019	Hala Sportowa Sokolnia, Koscierzyna, Poland	
