= Frazer Clarke =

British boxer (born 1991)

Personal information
- Nickname: Big Fraze
- Nationality: British
- Born: 7 August 1991 (age 35) Burton upon Trent, Staffordshire, England
- Height: 6 ft 5.5 in (197 cm)
- Weight: Heavyweight

Boxing career

Boxing record
- Total fights: 14
- Wins: 10
- Win by KO: 8
- Losses: 3
- Draws: 1
Medal record
Men's amateur boxing
Representing Great Britain
Olympic Games
Bronze medal – third place	2020 Tokyo	Super-heavyweight
Representing England
Commonwealth Games
Gold medal – first place	2018 Gold Coast	Super-heavyweight
English National Championships
Silver medal – second place	2012 London	Super-heavyweight
Silver medal – second place	2014 Liverpool	Super-heavyweight
Gold medal – first place	2015 Liverpool	Super-heavyweight
European Championships
Silver medal – second place	2017 Kharkiv	Super-heavyweight
European Union Championships
Gold medal – first place	2014 Sofia	Super-heavyweight
Gold medal – first place	2018 Valladolid	Super-heavyweight
Great Britain Championships
Gold medal – first place	2015 Rotherham	Super-heavyweight
Strandzha Cup
Gold medal – first place	2014 Sofia	Super-heavyweight
Bronze medal – third place	2016 Sofia	Super-heavyweight

Frazer Clarke (born 7 August 1991) is a British professional boxer. At regional level, he has challenged three times for the British heavyweight title and twice for Commonwealth heavyweight title. As an amateur, he won a silver medal at the 2017 European Championships; gold at the 2018 Commonwealth Games; and bronze at the 2020 Olympics.

== Amateur career ==
In December 2015, he won the super heavyweight division at the Rio 2016 test event.

In 2016, he was ultimately overlooked for Olympic qualification in favour of fellow super heavyweight boxer Joe Joyce (who went on to claim the silver medal in Rio 2016); however, he did make the British Lionhearts squad for their maiden WSB final against the Cuba Domadores and won his match against Lenier Pero, thereby denying the Domadores what would have otherwise been a 10–0 whitewash.

In 2017, he contested the European Championships and finished with a silver medal despite tearing his hamstring en route to the final. The subsequent operation required to mend it forced him to miss that year's World Championships.

In 2018, he beat Satish Kumar in the Commonwealth Games super heavyweight final, taking a unanimous judges' decision to claim gold.

In 2019, Clarke was selected to compete at the European Games in Minsk, Belarus, where he suffered a surprise defeat to Nelvie Tiafack in the round of 16. On his World Championships debut, he was originally deemed to have beaten Maksim Babanin by split decision (3:2) in the quarterfinals; this result was later overturned by a bout review jury on appeal.

Clarke won a bronze medal at the delayed 2020 Summer Olympics in Tokyo.

=== Highlights ===
- 2016 – World Series of Boxing Season 2016 Semi-finals – +91KG Won against Kamshybek Kunkabayev (KAZ) 3:0
- 2016 – World Series of Boxing Season 2016 Quarter-finals – +91KG Won against Vladyslav Sirenko (UKR) TKO 5th round
- 2016 – World Series of Boxing Season 2016 11th Round – +91KG Won against Nigel Paul (TRI) TKO 5th round
- 2016 – Strandja Memorial Tournament (Sofia, BUL) 3rd place – +91KG Lost to Petar Belberov (BUL) 2:1 in the semi-final; Won against Kem Ljungquist (DEN) WO in the quarter-final; Won against Ali Eren Demirezen (TUR) 3:0 in the first preliminary round
- 2016 – World Series of Boxing Season 2016 4th Round – +91KG Won against Ahmed Bourous (MAR) 3:0
- 2015 – Olympic Test Event (Rio de Janeiro, BRA) 1st place – +91KG Won against Erik Pfeifer (GER) 2:1 in the final; Won against Satish Kumar (IND) 3:0 in the semi-final
- 2015 – President's Cup (Erzurum, TUR) 1st place – +91KG Won against Ibrahim Demirezen (TUR) WO in the final; Won against Ihor Shevadzutskiy (UKR) 3:0 in the semi-final; Won against Nkoya Ngoma (DRC) WO in the quarter-final; Won against Muhammer Taha Aslan (TUR) TKO 1st round in the first preliminary round
- 2015 – British Championships (Rotherham, ENG) 1st place – +91KG Won against Joshua Quailey (ENG) TKO 3rd round in the final
- 2015 – English National Championships 1st place – +91KG Won against Natty Ngengwa (ENG) 3:0 in the final; Won against Joshua Quailey (ENG) 3:0 in the semi-final
- 2015 – Strandja Memorial Tournament (Sofia, BUL) 7th place – +91KG Lost to Petar Belberov (BUL) 2:1 in the quarter-final
- 2014 – Golden Belt Tournament (Chiajna, ROM) 1st place – +91KG Won against Yaroslav Doronichev (RUS) 3:0 in the final; Won against Daniel Emanuel Costea (ROM) 3:0 in the semi-final
- 2014 – Tammer Tournament (Tampere, FIN) 1st place – +91KG Won against Lenroy "Cam Awesome" Thompson (USA) 3:0 in the final; Won against Ruben Nazaryan (BEL) 3:0 in the semi-final
- 2014 – European Union Championships (Sofia, BUL) 1st place – +91KG Won against Guido Vianello (ITA) 3:0 in the final; Won against Tony Yoka (FRA) 3:0 in the semi-final; Won against Aleksei Zavatin (MDA) 3:0 in the quarter-final
- 2014 – English National Championships 2nd place – +91KG Lost to Joseph Joyce (ENG) TKO 3rd round in the final; Won against Fayz Aboadi Abbas (ENG) 3:0 in the semi-final; Won against Alan Johnson (ENG) TKO 2nd round in the quarter-final
- 2014 – Strandja Memorial Tournament (Sofia, BUL) 1st place – +91KG Won against Bahodir Jalolov (UZB) 3:0 in the final; Won against Gu Guangming (CHN) 3:0 in the semi-final; Won against Sergey Kuzmin (RUS) 3:0 in the quarter-final
- 2014 – RUS-GBR Dual Match (Astana, KAZ) – +91KG Won against Dmitriy Mukhin (RUS) 3:0
- 2014 – KAZ-GBR Dual Match (Astana, KAZ) – +91KG Lost to Zhan Kosobutskiy (KAZ) 2:1
- 2013 – Feliks Stamm Memorial Tournament (Warsaw, POL) 2nd place – +91KG Lost to Sergey Verveyko (POL) 18:12 in the final; Won against Yusuf Acik (TUR) 14:8 in the semi-final; Won against Alexei Zavatin (MDA) 10:9 in the quarter-final
- 2013 – Gee Bee Tournament (Helsinki, FIN) 3rd place – +91KG Lost to Maksim Babanin (RUS) 19:11 in the semi-final
- 2013 – Bocskai Memorial Tournament (Debrecen, HUN) 2nd place – +91KG Lost to Magomed Omarov (RUS) DQ 3rd round in the final; Won against Stefan Sliz (SVK) 19:6 in the semi-final; Won against Ruslan Kakushkin (BLR) 16:9 in the quarter-final
- 2012 – EUBC European Olympic Hopes 19–22 Championships (Kaliningrad, RUS) 3rd place – +91KG Lost to Gasan Gimbatov (RUS) 19:13 in the semi-final; Won against Nikita Maculevics (LAT) 16:10 in the quarter-final
- 2012 – British National Championships (London, ENG) 2nd place – +91KG Lost to Joseph Joyce (ENG) 37:36 in the final
- 2012 – English National Championships 2nd place – +91KG Lost to Joseph Joyce (ENG) 5:0 in the final; Won against Courtney Clift (ENG) DQ 3rd round in the semi-final
- 2012 – SWE-GBR Dual Match – +91KG Lost to Otto Wallin (SWE) 32:11
- 2011 – Tammer Tournament (Tampere, FIN) 3rd place – +91KG Lost to Kaspar Vaha (EST) 22:13 in the semi-final
- 2011 – British National Championships (London, ENG) 2nd place – +91KG Loss to Joseph Joyce (ENG) RSCI 2nd round in the final
- 2011 – English National Championships 3rd place – +91KG Lost to Fayz Aboadi Abbas (ENG) RSC 3rd round in the semi-final
- 2010 – Tammer Tournament (Tampere, FIN) 7th place – +91KG Lost to Lenroy Thompson (USA) 2+:2 in the quarter-final
- 2010 – Commonwealth Championships (New Delhi, IND) 3rd place – +91KG Lost to Joseph Parker (NZL) 7:3 in the semi-final
- 2009 – EUBC European Confederation Youth Boxing Championships (Szczecin, POL) 7th place – +91KG Lost to Tony Yoka (FRA) 3:2 in the quarter-final; Won against Gheorghe Dinu (ROM) 2:1 in the first preliminary round
- 2009 – ENG-GER Youth Dual Match2 (Dublin, IRL) – +91KG Lost to Ali Kiyidin (GER) 13:7
- 2009 – ENG-GER Youth Dual Match (Dublin, IRL) – +91KG Won against Ali Kiyidin (GER) 14:4
- 2009 – IRL-ENG Youth Dual Match (Dublin, IRL) – +91KG Won against Sean Turner (IRL) 13:2
- 2009 – British Youth Championships 1991 Born Boxers (Liverpool, ENG) 1st place – +91KG Won against Rhys Williams (WAL) RSC 3rd round in the final

== Professional career ==
It was announced in December 2021 that Clarke had signed a contract with promotional company BOXXER. His first professional fight was against Jake Darnell, which was on the undercard of Amir Khan vs. Kell Brook. He won the fight via knockout in round one.

Clarke challenged British, Commonwealth and WBO European heavyweight champion Fabio Wardley at The O2 Arena in London on 31 March 2024 with the fight ending in a split draw. One ringside judge scored the contest 114–113 to Wardley, another had it 115–112 for Clarke while the third ruled the bout a 113–113 tie.

A rematch took place at Kingdom Arena in Riyadh, Saudi Arabia, on 12 October 2024, which Clarke lost by knockout in the first round. Clarke suffered a broken jaw and visible skull deformation during the bout.

Clarke got back to winning ways in his next bout, stopping Ebenezer Tetteh in the first round at Resorts World Arena in Birmingham on 20 April 2025.

He was scheduled to face Jeamie Tshikeva for the vacant British heavyweight title at the Vaillant Arena in Derby on 25 October 2025, but the fight was postponed and rearranged to take place at the same venue on 29 November 2025, after his opponent suffered an injury during training camp. Clarke lost the fight via split decision.

Clarke lost to Justis Huni by majority decision over ten rounds at Tottenham Hotspur Stadium in London on 11 April 2026. In his next fight he stopped Lamah Griggs in the second round of their scheduled six-round bout at First Direct Arena in Leeds on 20 August 2026.

== Personal life ==
Clarke was born in England to a Jamaican father and English mother.

== Professional boxing record ==
14 fights	10 wins	3 losses
By knockout	8	1
By decision	2	2
Draws	1	

No.	Result	Record	Opponent	Type	Round, time	Date	Location	Notes
14	Win	10–3–1	Lamah Griggs	TKO	2 (6), 1:41	8 Aug 2026	First Direct Arena, Leeds, England	
13	Loss	9–3–1	Justis Huni	MD	10	11 Apr 2026	Tottenham Hotspur Stadium, London, England	
12	Loss	9–2–1	Jeamie Tshikeva	SD	12	29 Nov 2025	Valiant Arena, Derby, England	For vacant British heavyweight title
11	Win	9–1–1	Ebenezer Tetteh	TKO	1 (10), 1:52	20 Apr 2025	Resorts World Arena, Birmingham, England	
10	Loss	8–1–1	Fabio Wardley	TKO	1 (12), 2:28	12 Oct 2024	Kingdom Arena, Riyadh, Saudi Arabia	For British, Commonwealth, and WBA Continental heavyweight titles
9	Draw	8–0–1	Fabio Wardley	SD	12	31 Mar 2024	The O2 Arena, London, England	For British, Commonwealth, WBA Continental, and WBO European heavyweight titles
8	Win	8–0	David Allen	RTD	6 (10), 3:00	2 Sep 2023	Manchester Arena, Manchester, England	
7	Win	7–0	Mariusz Wach	PTS	10	16 Jun 2023	York Hall, London, England	
6	Win	6–0	Bogdan Dinu	RTD	2 (8), 3:00	25 Mar 2023	Manchester Arena, Manchester, England	
5	Win	5–0	Kevin Espindola	RTD	4 (8), 3:00	21 Jan 2023	Manchester Arena, Manchester, England	
4	Win	4–0	Kamil Sokołowski	PTS	6	12 Nov 2022	Manchester Arena, Manchester, England	
3	Win	3–0	Pencho Tsvetkov	TKO	1 (6), 1:05	3 Sep 2022	Echo Arena, Liverpool, England	
2	Win	2–0	Ariel Bracamonte	TKO	2 (6), 2:57	30 Jul 2022	Bournemouth International Centre, Bournemouth, England	
1	Win	1–0	Jake Darnell	TKO	1 (6), 2:06	19 Feb 2022	Manchester Arena, Manchester, England	
