= Fabio Wardley =

British boxer (born 1994)

Personal information
- Born: 18 December 1994 (age 31) Ipswich, Suffolk, England
- Height: 6 ft 5 in (196 cm)
- Weight: Heavyweight

Boxing career
- Reach: 78 in (198 cm)
- Stance: Orthodox

Boxing record
- Total fights: 23
- Wins: 20
- Win by KO: 19
- Losses: 2
- Draws: 1

Fabio Wardley (born 18 December 1994) is an English professional boxer. He held the World Boxing Organization (WBO) heavyweight title from 2025 to May 2026. He also held the World Boxing Association (WBA) interim heavyweight title in 2025. At regional level, he has held multiple heavyweight championships, including the British and Commonwealth titles between 2022 and 2025.

In 2025, Wardley swept British Fighter of the Year honours from ESPN, Boxing News, and British Boxing News, with his knockout of Justis Huni also earning Knockout of the Year recognition from each outlet.

== Early life ==
Wardley was raised by his mother, a single parent. Prior to boxing, he worked as a recruitment consultant and played football on the weekends.

Wardley began boxing at the late age of 21, going on to compete in four white-collar boxing shows, winning all of them by knockout. He had no amateur experience before turning professional.

== Professional career ==
=== Early career ===
Wardley turned professional in 2017 at the age of 22, having signed with Mervyn Turner's Shamrock Boxing Promotions. In his first bout he defeated Jakob Wojcik by decision at York Hall. In November 2018, with a 4–0 record and 3 consecutive first round knockouts, Wardley left Shamrock Promotions and signed with fellow British heavyweight and sparring partner Dillian Whyte, who became his manager.

He claimed the vacant English heavyweight title when he beat Simon Vallily by third-round knockout on 1 August 2020.

=== British and Commonwealth champion ===
==== Wardley vs. Gorman ====
Wardley won the British heavyweight title on 26 November 2022 by forcing a corner stoppage in the third round against Nathan Gorman.

==== Wardley vs. Adeleye ====
On 28 October 2023, Wardley fought David Adeleye on the undercard of the Tyson Fury vs. Francis Ngannou contest in Saudi Arabia with the vacant Commonwealth heavyweight title, Wardley's British championship and Adeleye's WBO European heavyweight belt and WBA intercontinental heavyweight title all up for grabs. Wardley won the fight via TKO in the seventh round.

==== Wardley vs. Clarke ====
On 31 March 2024, he retained his four titles with a split decision draw against Frazer Clarke at The O2 Arena in London. One ringside judge scored the fight 114–113 to Wardley, another had it 115–112 for Clarke while the third ruled the contest a 113–113 tie.

==== Wardley vs. Clarke II ====
In August 2024, Wardley signed a multi-fight deal with Frank Warren's Queensbury Promotions, ahead of a rematch with Clarke at Kingdom Arena in Riyadh, Saudi Arabia, on the undercard of Artur Beterbiev vs. Dmitry Bivol on 12 October 2024. Wardley won by devastating knockout in the first round. Clarke suffered a broken jaw and visible skull deformation following the bout.

Wardley vacated his British title in March 2025 after being named as mandatory challenger for the WBA regular heavyweight championship held by Kubrat Pulev.

=== WBA and WBO interim heavyweight champion ===
==== Wardley vs. Huni ====
He faced Justis Huni for the WBA interim heavyweight title at Portman Road in Ipswich on 7 June 2025. Originally, he was set to face Jarrell Miller for the title, but Miller pulled out on 30 April, citing a shoulder injury. Huni outboxed Wardley for nine rounds and was well ahead on the scorecards before Wardley suddenly knocked him out in the tenth round with an overhand right, winning the title.

==== Wardley vs. Parker ====
On 25 October 2025, Wardley beat former WBO heavyweight champion Joseph Parker in the eleventh round via TKO. After stunning Parker and forcing him against the ropes, Wardley unleashed a barrage of punches that prompted referee Howard Foster to stop the fight. With this victory, Wardley captured the WBO interim heavyweight title.

=== WBO heavyweight champion ===
Wardley was promoted to full WBO heavyweight champion on 17 November 2025 when Oleksandr Usyk vacated the title after being ordered to face him.

==== Wardley vs. Dubois ====
Wardley was scheduled to make a voluntary first defence of his WBO heavyweight title against former IBF heavyweight world champion Daniel Dubois at the Co-op Live in Manchester, England, on 9 May 2026.

On the night of the fight, Wardley started the first round aggressively, knocking Dubois down just ten seconds into the contest with a clean right hand. He followed this up by dropping Dubois again in the third round. However, Dubois gradually took control of the centre of the ring as the fight progressed. By the later rounds, Wardley began to tire and suffered significant swelling to his right eye as a result of repeated shots to the face. The contest ended in the eleventh round when, after continuous power shots from Dubois, the referee intervened to save a defenceless Wardley from further punishment. Dubois was declared the winner via technical knockout, claiming the WBO title to become a two-time world heavyweight champion.

== Personal life ==
Wardley is a lifelong fan of local team Ipswich Town F.C.. He told BBC Radio Suffolk in October 2024 that it was his 'dream' to fight at Ipswich Town's home ground of Portman Road, which he eventually achieved with his knockout victory over Justis Huni on 7 June 2025. In 2025, Wardley became a father with the birth of his daughter.

== Professional boxing record ==
23 fights	20 wins	2 losses
By knockout	19	2
By decision	1	0
Draws	1	

No.	Result	Record	Opponent	Type	Round, time	Date	Location	Notes
23	Loss	20–2–1	Daniel Dubois	TKO	2 (12), 2:21	17 Oct 2026	The O2 Arena, London, England	For WBO heavyweight title
22	Loss	20–1–1	Daniel Dubois	TKO	11 (12), 0:28	9 May 2026	Co-op Live, Manchester, England	Lost WBO heavyweight title
21	Win	20–0–1	Joseph Parker	TKO	11 (12), 1:54	25 Oct 2025	The O2 Arena, London, England	Won WBO interim heavyweight title
20	Win	19–0–1	Justis Huni	KO	10 (12), 1:42	7 Jun 2025	Portman Road, Ipswich, England	Won vacant WBA interim heavyweight title
19	Win	18–0–1	Frazer Clarke	TKO	1 (12), 2:28	12 Oct 2024	Kingdom Arena, Riyadh, Saudi Arabia	Retained British, Commonwealth, and WBA Continental heavyweight titles
18	Draw	17–0–1	Frazer Clarke	SD	12	31 Mar 2024	The O2 Arena, London, England	Retained British, Commonwealth, WBA Continental, and WBO European heavyweight titles
17	Win	17–0	David Adeleye	TKO	7 (12), 2:43	28 Oct 2023	Boulevard Hall, Riyadh, Saudi Arabia	Retained British, and WBA Continental heavyweight titles; Won WBO European, and vacant Commonwealth heavyweight titles
16	Win	16–0	Michael Polite Coffie	TKO	4 (10), 0:45	1 Apr 2023	The O2 Arena, London, England	Won vacant WBA Continental heavyweight title
15	Win	15–0	Nathan Gorman	TKO	3 (12), 0:32	26 Nov 2022	Wembley Arena, London, England	Won vacant British heavyweight title
14	Win	14–0	Chris Healey	TKO	2 (8), 0:40	9 Jul 2022	The O2 Arena, London, England	
13	Win	13–0	Daniel Martz	KO	2 (10), 1:30	27 Feb 2022	The O2 Arena, London, England	
12	Win	12–0	Nick Webb	KO	1 (10), 2:30	7 Aug 2021	Matchroom Headquarters, Brentwood, England	Retained English heavyweight title
11	Win	11–0	Éric Molina	KO	5 (10), 0:52	27 Mar 2021	Europa Point Sports Complex, Gibraltar	
10	Win	10–0	Richard Lartey	TKO	2 (10), 1:22	21 Nov 2020	Wembley Arena, London, England	
9	Win	9–0	Simon Vallily	TKO	3 (10), 1:01	1 Aug 2020	Matchroom Headquarters, Brentwood, England	Won vacant English heavyweight title
8	Win	8–0	Mariano Ruben Diaz Strunz	TKO	6 (8), 1:06	20 Jul 2019	The O2 Arena, London, England	
7	Win	7–0	Dennis Lewandowski	TKO	3 (8), 2:35	10 May 2019	Nottingham Arena, Nottingham, England	
6	Win	6–0	Morgan Dessaux	TKO	1 (6), 1:43	2 Feb 2019	The O2 Arena, London, England	
5	Win	5–0	Phil Williams	TKO	3 (4), 1:58	22 Dec 2018	The O2 Arena, London, England	
4	Win	4–0	Ferenc Zsalek	KO	1 (6), 1:41	26 May 2018	Corn Exchange, Ipswich, England	
3	Win	3–0	Scott Saward	KO	1 (4), 2:54	18 Nov 2017	Epic Centre, Norwich, England	
2	Win	2–0	Zheko Zhekov	TKO	1 (4), 2:46	22 Jul 2017	Epic Centre, Norwich, England	
1	Win	1–0	Jakub Wójcicki	PTS	4	8 Apr 2017	York Hall, London, England	

== Titles in boxing ==
=== Major world titles ===
- WBO heavyweight champion (200+ lbs)

=== Interim world titles ===
- WBA interim heavyweight champion (200+ lbs)
- WBO interim heavyweight champion (200+ lbs)

=== Regional/International titles ===
- Commonwealth heavyweight champion (200+ lbs)
- British heavyweight champion (200+ lbs)
- WBO European heavyweight champion (200+ lbs)
- WBA Continental heavyweight champion (200+ lbs)
- English heavyweight champion (200+ lbs)

== See also ==
- List of male boxers
- List of British world boxing champions
- List of world heavyweight boxing champions

Sporting positions
Regional boxing titles
Vacant Title last held by Daniel Dubois	English heavyweight champion 1 August 2020 – March 2023; Vacated	Vacant Title next held by Solomon Dacres
Vacant Title last held by Joe Joyce	British heavyweight champion 26 November 2022 – 14 March 2025; Vacated	Vacant Title next held by David Adeleye
Vacant Title last held by Agit Kabayel	WBA Continental heavyweight champion 1 April 2023 – March 2025; Vacated	Vacant Title next held by Artem Suslenkov
Vacant Title last held by Joe Joyce	Commonwealth heavyweight champion 28 October 2023 – 7 June 2025; Won interim title	Vacant Title next held by Moses Itauma
Preceded by David Adeleye	WBO European heavyweight champion 28 October 2023 – July 2024; Vacated	Vacant Title next held by Nelson Hysa
World boxing titles
Vacant Title last held by Daniel Dubois	WBA heavyweight champion Interim title 7 June – 25 October 2025; Vacated	Vacant
Preceded by Joseph Parker	WBO heavyweight champion Interim title 25 October – 17 November 2025; Promoted	Vacant
Preceded by Oleksandr Usyk; Vacated	WBO heavyweight champion 17 November 2025 – 9 May 2026	Succeeded by Daniel Dubois
