= Junior Anthony Wright =

American boxer (born 1986)

Junior Anthony Wright Jr.
Personal information
- Nickname: Hurricane
- Born: August 12, 1986 (age 40) Evanston, Illinois, U.S.
- Height: 6 ft 0 in (183 cm)
- Weight: Cruiserweight; Heavyweight

Boxing career
- Reach: 76.75 in (195 cm)
- Stance: Orthodox

Boxing record
- Total fights: 30
- Wins: 21
- Win by KO: 17
- Losses: 8
- Draws: 1

Junior Anthony Wright Jr. (born August 12, 1986) is an American professional boxer who challenged for the WBA cruiserweight title in 2016. As an amateur, he was a three-time Chicago Golden Gloves champion and also fought in the National Golden Gloves tournament.

== Early life ==
Wright was born in Evanston, Illinois, on the northern outskirts of Chicago, where he currently resides and trains. At age 16, he was introduced to boxing when he played the video game Knockout Kings, and joined a boxing gym in Chicago shortly thereafter.

== Amateur career ==
In 2008, at age 21, Wright made his amateur boxing debut. As an amateur, he trained out of the Loyola Boxing Club under Steve Hoffman where he won his first two Chicago Golden Gloves titles, and later with the Evanston Boxing Club where he won his third Chicago Golden Gloves title; winning twice at middleweight and once as a light heavyweight. He also competed in the 2008 National Golden Gloves tournament, losing to Denis Douglin three rounds to two, who ultimately won the tournament.

== Professional career ==
On October 7, 2011, at age 25, Wright made his professional debut in Burbank, Illinois in a cruiserweight bout in which he defeated Darrion Fletcher by first-round knockout (KO). He went on to win his next nine fights (seven at cruiserweight and two at heavyweight) to accumulate a professional record of 10–0 (9 KOs), earning him a chance at the vacant WBC International cruiserweight title against Stivens Bujaj on May 15, 2014. In the ten-round fight, held at the Millennium Theater in Brighton Beach, Brooklyn, New York, Wright fought to a split draw with the judges' scorecards reading 96–94, 95–95, and 94–96. Following his fight against Bujaj, Wright signed with Dmitry Salita's Star of David Promotions.

In 2014, Wright joined the training camp of world champion Adonis Stevenson to assist him in his preparation for his WBC light heavyweight title defense against Dmitry Sukhotsky, which Stevenson went on to win via fifth-round KO.

Wright won his next three fights (two at cruiserweight and one at heavyweight) to improve his professional record to 13–0–1. He dedicated one of these fights, his technical knockout (TKO) victory over Rayford Johnson, to a pair of NYPD officers who were shot and killed in the month leading up to the fight. his 2015 fight for the vacant IBO cruiserweight title, in which he suffered his first professional defeat to Rakhim Chakhkiev.

On May 21, 2016, after winning his next two cruiserweight fights, Wright fought Beibut Shumenov for the WBA cruiserweight title in Las Vegas. Shumenov defeated Wright via tenth-round TKO. After the Shumenov fight, Wright moved up to the heavyweight division – fighting only more time as a cruiserweight in a unanimous decision (UD) loss to undefeated Ruslan Fayer in 2017. Since the Shumenov fight, Wright has won all three of his heavyweight fights by TKO or KO to improve to a professional record of 18–3–1.

Rick Wilson and Steve Clemente have both trained Wright during his professional boxing career.

== Professional boxing record ==
30 fights	21 wins	8 losses
By knockout	17	7
By decision	4	1
Draws	1	

No.	Result	Record	Opponent	Type	Round, time	Date	Location	Notes
30	Loss	21–8–1	Kacper Meyna	KO	1 (10), 1:14	25 Apr 2026	Hala Sportowa Sokolnia, Kościerzyna, Poland	For vacant Republic of Poland International heavyweight title
29	Loss	21–7–1	Jerry Forrest	KO	2 (10), 2:19	Jul 26, 2025	Richmond Main Street Station, Richmond, Virginia, U.S.	
28	Win	21–6–1	Cassius Chaney	UD	10	Mar 22, 2025	Royale Nightclub, Boston Massachusetts, U.S.	
27	Loss	20–6–1	Andrew Tabiti	KO	1 (10), 2:29	Apr 27, 2024	Liacouras Center, Philadelphia, Pennsylvania, U.S.	
26	Loss	20–5–1	Arslanbek Makhmudov	TKO	1 (10), 1:10	Oct 28, 2023	Kingdom Arena, Riyadh, Saudi Arabia	For WBC–NABF and vacant WBA Inter-Continental cruiserweight titles
25	Win	20–4–1	Brian Howard	KO	1 (6), 2:17	Apr 14, 2023	Clarion Hotel, Tinicum, Pennsylvania, U.S.	
24	Win	19–4–1	Colby Madison	KO	3 (6), 0:27	Oct 1, 2022	2300 Arena, Philadelphia, Pennsylvania, U.S.	
23	Loss	18–4–1	Joe Jones	KO	2 (6), 0:13	Dec 2, 2021	Hammerstein Ballroom, New York City, New York, U.S.	
22	Win	18–3–1	Alfredo Trevino	TKO	1 (6), 0:36	Aug 28, 2021	New England Sports Center, Derry, New Hampshire, U.S.	
21	Win	17–3–1	Antwaun Tubbs	TKO	4 (4), 2:29	Mar 22, 2019	Horseshoe Casino, Hammond, Indiana, U.S.	
20	Loss	16–3–1	Ruslan Fayfer	UD	12	Aug 18, 2017	Usadba Familiya, Plastunovskaya, Russia	
19	Win	16–2–1	Damon McCreary	KO	2 (6), 2:04	Jan 22, 2017	Masonic Temple, Detroit, Michigan, U.S.	
18	Loss	15–2–1	Beibut Shumenov	TKO	10 (12), 1:04	May 21, 2016	Cosmopolitan of Las Vegas, Paradise, Nevada, U.S.	For vacant WBA (Regular) cruiserweight title
17	Win	15–1–1	Jim Franklin	TKO	1 (6), 1:50	Feb 19, 2016	WinnaVegas Casino Resort, Sloan, Iowa, U.S.	
16	Win	14–1–1	Harvey Jolly	UD	6	Aug 25, 2015	MCU Park, New York City, New York, U.S.	
15	Loss	13–1–1	Rakhim Chakhkiev	KO	8 (12), 2:39	May 22, 2015	Luzhniki Stadium Moscow, Russia	For vacant IBO cruiserweight title
14	Win	13–0–1	Rayford Johnson	TKO	2 (8), 1:32	Jan 22, 2015	Webster Hall, New York City, New York, U.S.	
13	Win	12–0–1	Lucas St. Clair	TKO	3 (6), 0:44	Nov 1, 2014	Milwaukee Harley-Davidson, Milwaukee, Wisconsin, U.S.	
12	Win	11–0–1	Marlon Hayes	UD	6	Aug 15, 2014	Royal Oak Music Theatre, Royal Oak, Michigan, U.S.	
11	Draw	10–0–1	Stivens Bujaj	SD	10	May 15, 2014	Millenium Theater, New York City, New York, U.S.	For vacant WBC International cruiserweight title
10	Win	10–0	Galen Brown	KO	4 (6), 0:20	Feb 7, 2014	UIC Pavilion, Chicago, Illinois, U.S.	
9	Win	9–0	Harley Kilfian	TKO	3 (4), 2:50	Dec 6, 2013	UIC Pavilion, Chicago, Illinois, U.S.	
8	Win	8–0	Nick Kisner	SD	6	Aug 16, 2013	U.S. Cellular Field, Chicago, Illinois, U.S.	
7	Win	7–0	Chris Thomas	TKO	3 (6), 2:30	Apr 13, 2013	Radisson Star Plaza, Merrillville, Indiana, U.S.	
6	Win	6–0	Tim Johnson	KO	2 (4), 0:56	Feb 1, 2013	UIC Pavilion, Chicago, Illinois, U.S.	
5	Win	5–0	Nick Reeder	TKO	2 (4), 1:30	Dec 14, 2012	Cicero Stadium, Cicero, Illinois, U.S.	
4	Win	4–0	Covon Graham	KO	1 (4), 2:58	Jul 13, 2012	UIC Pavilion, Chicago, Illinois, U.S.	
3	Win	3–0	Rogelio Saldana	KO	1 (4), 1:14	Feb 24, 2012	UIC Pavilion, Chicago, Illinois, U.S.	
2	Win	2–0	Brandon Bennett	TKO	1 (4), 1:33	Jan 13, 2012	Horseshoe Casino, Elizabeth, Indiana, U.S.	
1	Win	1–0	Darrion Fletcher	KO	1 (4), 0:58	Oct 7, 2011	The Club Chicago, Burbank, Illinois, U.S.	

== Personal life ==
Starting at age 11, Wright worked for his father's landscaping company. As an amateur boxer, Wright balanced his training with working approximately 65 hours per week at Home Depot while also helping with his father's business. He continued to work at Home Depot through much of his professional boxing career. He briefly enrolled in community college, but dropped out in order to earn money.
