= David Adeleye =

British boxer (born 1996)

David Bankole Adeleye
Personal information
- Nickname: Big D
- Born: David Bankole Adeleye; 16 November 1996 (age 30) London, England
- Height: 6 ft 4 1/2 in (194 cm)
- Weight: Heavyweight

Boxing career
- Stance: Orthodox

Boxing record
- Total fights: 17
- Wins: 15
- Win by KO: 13
- Losses: 2

David Bankole Adeleye (born 16 November 1996) is a British professional boxer. At regional level, he held the British heavyweight title in 2025 and challenged once for the Commonwealth title in 2023.

== Early life ==
Adeleye was born on 16 November 1996 in London, England, Adeleye is the son of Nigerian parents who hailed from Ikole in Ekiti State, Nigeria. Adeleye's parents never wished for him to go into professional boxing until he had at least finished higher-education. When Adeleye was growing up, he admired Lennox Lewis, Muhammad Ali and Roy Jones Jr.

== Amateur career ==
Adeleye began boxing at the Dale Youth Club, at the age of 14, under the tutelage of Gary McGuiness. He became Junior ABA champion in 2013, and winning the Senior ABA Novices in 2017 before winning the Senior ABA title in 2018. He later represented England in an international against Denmark in 2018 and secured gold at the British Universities and Colleges Sport Boxing Championships.

== Professional career ==
On 12 July 2019, it was confirmed that Adeleye had turned professional under Frank Warren's Queensberry Promotions banner. Adeleye made his professional debut on 21 December 2019, on the undercard of Daniel Dubois against Kyotaro Fujimoto for the vacant WBC Silver heavyweight title at the Copper Box Arena in London. The referee, Mark Bates, called a halt to proceedings as Adeleye defeated Lithuanian fighter Dmitrij Kalinovskij via technical knockout (TKO) in the first round. On 10 July 2020, Adeleye returned with a second-round knockout over Matt Gordon at the BT Sport Studio in London. Adeleye's third fight was a return to the BT Sport Studio on 29 August against Phil Williams, whom Adeleye stopped in the third round, achieving his third knockout victory in a row.

Adeleye fought Fabio Wardley on the undercard of Tyson Fury vs. Francis Ngannou in Saudi Arabia on 28 October 2023, for the vacant Commonwealth heavyweight strap, Wardley's British championship, and Adeleye's WBO European heavyweight belt. He lost the fight via TKO in the seventh round which resulted in him losing his undefeated record. Adeleye was knocked down in the seventh round from a left hook, which left him flat on his back, before managing to get back up on nine seconds of the 10 count. Wardley then unleashed a barrage of punches with nothing coming back from Adeleye, resulting in the referee calling a stop to the fight, thereby declaring Wardley the winner by technical knock-out. Adeleye protested the stoppage and shoved the referee John Latham.

After more than a year away from competitive action, Adeleye returned to the ring on 7 December 2024, stopping English heavyweight champion Solomon Dacres in the first round of their fight at Wembley Arena in London.

Adeleye faced Jeamie Tshikeva for the vacant British heavyweight title at the Co-Op Live Arena in Manchester on 5 April 2025. He won by stoppage in the sixth round.

Without making any defenses, Adeleye vacated the British title in July 2025.

On 16 August 2025, he lost to Filip Hrgović by unanimous decision in Riyadh, Saudi Arabia, on the undercard of the Moses Itauma vs Dillian Whyte fight.

After 15 months away from the competitive boxing ring, Adeleye returned to face Alexander Flores for the vacant WBA International heavyweight title at Dignity Health Sports Park in Carson, California, United States, on 14 November 2026. He knocked his opponent to the canvas in the third round and went on to win via unanimous decision.

== Personal life ==
Adeleye, who had combined amateur boxing with his studies, graduated in 2018 from the University of Wolverhampton with a degree in business management, in which his dissertation was on the business aspect of boxing.

== Professional boxing record ==
17 fights	15 wins	2 losses
By knockout	13	1
By decision	2	1

No.	Result	Record	Opponent	Type	Round, time	Date	Location	Notes
17	Won	15–2	Alexander Flores	UD	10	14 Nov 2026	Dignity Health Sports Park, Carson, California, U.S.	Won vacant WBA International heavyweight title
16	Loss	14–2	Filip Hrgović	UD	10	16 Aug 2025	anb Arena, Riyadh, Saudi Arabia	For WBO International and vacant WBA Continental Gold heavyweight titles
15	Win	14–1	Jeamie Tshikeva	TKO	6 (12), 0:55	5 Apr 2025	Co-op Live, Manchester, England	Won vacant British heavyweight title
14	Win	13–1	Solomon Dacres	TKO	1 (10), 1:20	7 Dec 2024	Wembley Arena, London, England	Won English heavyweight title
13	Loss	12–1	Fabio Wardley	TKO	7 (12), 2:43	28 Oct 2023	Boulevard Hall, Riyadh, Saudi Arabia	Lost WBO European heavyweight title; For British, WBA Continental and vacant Commonwealth heavyweight titles
12	Win	12–0	Emir Ahmatovic	RTD	5 (10), 3:00	9 Jun 2023	York Hall, London, England	Retained WBO European heavyweight title
11	Win	11–0	Dmytro Bezus	TKO	2 (10), 1:48	17 Feb 2023	York Hall, London, England	Won WBO European heavyweight title
10	Win	10–0	Elvis Garcia	TKO	2 (6), 2:27	11 Nov 2022	York Hall, London, England	
9	Win	9–0	Chris Healey	TKO	4 (8), 0:52	23 Apr 2022	Wembley Stadium, London, England	
8	Win	8–0	Dominik Musil	RTD	4 (8), 3:00	12 Nov 2021	York Hall, London, England	
7	Win	7–0	Mladen Manev	TKO	4 (6), 1:54	24 Jul 2021	The SSE Arena, London, England	
6	Win	6–0	Kamil Sokołowski	PTS	6	24 Apr 2021	York Hall, London, England	
5	Win	5–0	Dave Preston	KO	1 (4), 1:20	26 Mar 2021	Copper Box Arena, London, England	
4	Win	4–0	Danny Whitaker	TKO	2 (6), 2:09	28 Nov 2020	Church House, London, England	
3	Win	3–0	Phil Williams	TKO	3 (4), 2:10	29 Aug 2020	BT Sport Studio, London, England	
2	Win	2–0	Matt Gordon	TKO	2 (4), 2:44	10 Jul 2020	BT Sport Studio, London, England	
1	Win	1–0	Dmitrij Kalinovskij	TKO	1 (4), 2:25	21 Dec 2019	Copper Box Arena, London, England	
