= Raphael Akpejiori =

Nigerian boxer (born 1990)

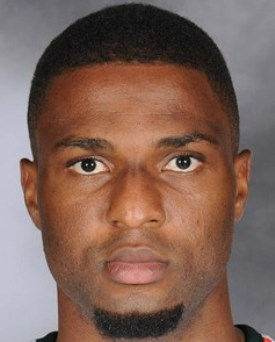

Personal information
- Born: Ethasor Raphael Akpejiori; 10 October 1990 (age 36) Surulere, Lagos, Nigeria
- Height: 6 ft 8 in (203 cm)
- Weight: Heavyweight

Boxing career
- Reach: 85 in (216 cm)
- Stance: Orthodox

Boxing record
- Total fights: 23
- Wins: 19
- Win by KO: 18
- Losses: 4

Raphael Akpejiori (born 10 October 1990) is a Nigerian professional boxer competing in the heavyweight division.

== Early life ==
Raphael Akpejiori was born on 10 October 1990 in Lagos, Nigeria to Pius and Clara Akpejiori, and grew up in the Surulere area of the city. He was raised alongside his five siblings – Okhiaofe, Ilamosi, Eshemokha, Ideoghena, and Eboshogwe. He developed a passion for sports and education. His father, Pius, was a player for New Nigerian Bank Football Club, and his mother was a sprinter competing for Edo State.

In 2008, at the age of 17, he moved to Bel Aire, Kansas, United States, on a basketball scholarship, where he attended Sunrise Christian Academy. Two years later, in 2010, he was recruited by the University of Miami, where he played as a forward for the university's basketball team for four seasons. During his graduate studies, he transitioned to American football in 2014 and earned an invitation to the Miami Dolphins' training camp in 2015.

Akpejiori holds a bachelor's and master's degree in mechanical engineering.

== Amateur career ==
Akpejiori had a brief amateur career, compiling a record of 13–1 (10 KOs). He was invited by the Nigerian Boxing Federation to compete for Nigeria at the Tokyo Olympics in 2020 as a super-heavyweight.

== Professional career ==
Trained by former world champion Glen Johnson, Akpejiori signed with CES Boxing and made his professional debut on 14 September 2018, scoring a first-round technical knockout (TKO) victory over Omar Acosta at the Twin River Event Center in Lincoln, Rhode Island. Following another first-round TKO win over James Advincola in November, Akpejiori scored three more first-round stoppage wins in 2019; a knockout (KO) over Leo Cassiani in June; and TKOs over Johan Lopez in July and Jose Pulido in August. Akpejiori's first fight of 2020 was a second-round TKO win against Mike Ford in January. He faced Gary Kelly in his seventh professional fight on 22 August 2020, which he won by a second-round TKO. On 7 November 2020, he beat Jared Torgeson by a second-round TKO. Akpejiori faced Joshua Tuani on 23 January 2021 and won by a first round KO. He then extended his winning record to 10–0 after beating Curtis Head on 21 April 2021, again winning by a first-round KO.

Akpejiori beat Brandon Spencer by a second-round TKO on 11 June 2021. He then faced Steven Lyons on 10 July 2021, and won by a first-round TKO. On 6 November 2021, he faced Satander Silgado Gelez and won by a first-round TKO. On 11 June 2022, Akpejiori faced Terrell Jamal Woods. it was the first time in this career the Nigerian fought past the second round, winning by unanimous decision. On 21 January 2021, Akpejiori faced Dell Long and won by another first-round KO.

Akpejiori then challenged Russian boxer Arslanbek Makhmudov for his WBC-NABF heavyweight title at Toledo, Ohio on 1 July 2023. Akpejiori lost the fight by TKO in the second round after being dropped three times.

== Personal life ==
In November 2023, Akpejiori married basketball player and NBA analyst Chiney Ogwumike.

== Professional boxing record ==
23 fights	19 wins	4 losses
By knockout	18	3
By decision	1	1

No.	Result	Record	Opponent	Type	Round, time	Date	Location	Notes
23	Loss	19–4	Da'Mazion Vanhouter	KO	1 (8), 1:58	12 Sep 2026	T-Mobile Arena, Paradise, Nevada, U.S.	
22	Loss	19–3	Mourad Aliev	UD	8	23 May 2026	Willy-Jürissen-Halle, Oberhausen, Germany	For vacant WBC International Silver heavyweight title
21	Win	19–2	Frank Mola	TKO	2 (8), 2:11	7 Feb 2026	Sosua Convention Center, Sosúa, Dominican Republic	
20	Loss	18–2	Stephan Shaw	KO	1 (10), 0:33	12 Apr 2025	Maryland Live! Casino, Hanover, Maryland, U.S.	
19	Win	18–1	Alexis Garcia	TKO	6 (10), 3:00	28 Jun 2024	Pabellon de Esgrima, Centro Olimpico, Santo Domingo, Dominican Republic	
18	Win	17–1	Santander Silgado	TKO	1 (6), 2:59	1 Mar 2024	Ronald Reagan Equestrian Center, Miami, Florida, U.S.	
17	Win	16–1	Francisco Silvens Mateo	KO	1 (10), 2:19	9 Feb 2024	Coco Locos Restaurant Sports Bar, Sosúa, Dominican Republic	
16	Loss	15–1	Arslanbek Makhmudov	TKO	2 (10), 1:43	1 Jul 2023	Huntington Center, Toledo, Ohio, U.S.	For WBC-NABF heavyweight title
15	Win	15–0	Dell Long	TKO	1 (8), 1:48	21 Jan 2023	Calta’s Fitness & Boxing, Tampa, Florida, U.S.	
14	Win	14–0	Terrell Jamal Woods	UD	8	11 Jun 2022	Center Stage Theater, Atlanta, Georgia, U.S.	
13	Win	13–0	Santander Silgado	TKO	1 (8), 1:30	6 Nov 2021	Miami Airport Convention Center, Miami, Florida, U.S.	
12	Win	12–0	Steven Lyons	TKO	1 (8), 2:59	10 Jul 2021	Miami Airport Convention Center, Miami, Florida, U.S.	
11	Win	11–0	Brandon Spencer	TKO	2 (8), 1:42	11 Jun 2021	Avanti Palms Resort, Orlando, Florida, U.S.	
10	Win	10–0	Curtis Head	TKO	1 (6), 2:21	24 Apr 2021	1500 Grand Central Ave, Vienna, West Virginia, U.S.	
9	Win	9–0	Joshua Tuani	KO	1 (6), 2:46	23 Jan 2021	Miramar Regional Park Amphitheater, Miramar, Florida, U.S.	
8	Win	8–0	Jared Torgeson	TKO	2 (6), 1:36	7 Nov 2020	Bonita Springs Elks Lodge, Bonita Springs, Florida, U.S.	
7	Win	7–0	Gary Kelly	TKO	2 (6), 2:02	22 Aug 2020	Bonita Springs Elks Lodge, Bonita Springs, Florida, U.S.	
6	Win	6–0	Mike Ford	TKO	2 (6), 0:47	17 Jan 2020	Gulfstream Park, Hallandale Beach, Florida, U.S.	
5	Win	5–0	Jose Pulido	TKO	2 (6), 1:40	17 Aug 2019	Plaza Principal de Pacho, Pacho, Colombia	
4	Win	4–0	Johan Lopez	TKO	1 (4), 2:59	26 Jul 2019	Miccosukee Resort & Gaming, Miami, Florida, U.S.	
3	Win	3–0	Leo Cassiani	KO	1 (4), 2:45	15 Jun 2019	Parque Central, Tolú, Colombia	
2	Win	2–0	James Advincola	TKO	1 (4), 0:49	21 Nov 2018	Twin River Event Center, Lincoln, Rhode Island, U.S.	
1	Win	1–0	Omar Acosta	TKO	1 (4), 0:59	14 Sep 2018	Twin River Event Center, Lincoln, Rhode Island, U.S.	
