= Justis Huni =

Australian boxer (born 1999)

Personal information
- Nicknames: JPH, The Blind Magician
- Born: 4 April 1999 (age 27) Meadowbrook, Queensland, Australia
- Height: 1.93 m (6 ft 4 in)
- Weight: Heavyweight

Boxing career
- Stance: Orthodox

Boxing record
- Total fights: 14
- Wins: 13
- Win by KO: 7
- Losses: 1
Medal record
Men's amateur boxing
Representing Australia
World Championships
Bronze medal – third place	2019 Yekaterinburg	Super-heavyweight
Youth World Championships
Gold medal – first place	2016 Saint Petersburg	Super-heavyweight

Justis Huni (born 4 April 1999) is an Australian professional boxer. He challenged for the WBA interim heavyweight title in 2025. At regional level, he has held multiple heavyweight championships, including the Australian title from 2020 to 2021. As an amateur, Huni won a bronze medal at the 2019 World Championships.

== Early life ==
Huni was born on 4 April 1999 in Meadowbrook, a suburb of Logan City, in the metropolitan area of Brisbane, Queensland. He is of Tongan, Swedish, Samoan and Dutch descent. His first sporting love was rugby league where he began playing for the Souths Sunnybank Magpies as a child but gave away the sport at the age of eight to pursue a career in boxing.

== Amateur career ==
=== World Championships result ===
Yekaterinburg 2019

- First round: Defeated Cristian Salcedo (Colombia) 5–0
- Second round: Defeated Nigel Paul (Trinidad and Tobago) RSC
- Quarter-finals: Defeated Mahammad Abdullayev (Azerbaijan) 5–0
- Semi-finals: Defeated by Kamshybek Kunkabayev (Kazakhstan) W/O

== Professional career ==
On 22 October 2020, Huni made his professional debut against Australian heavyweight champion, Faiga Opelu. Huni dominated throughout the bout and in the seventh round, he secured victory after his opponent's corner threw in the towel to protect Opelu from further damage.

On 3 December 2020, Huni fought for the second time as a professional against Arsene Fosso. After controlling the opening three rounds, referee Phil Austin called a halt to the fight in the fourth round after Fosso took a number of heavy blows from Huni.

Huni had three more professional fights in the first half of 2021, knocking out Jack Maris on 10 April and defeating Christian Tsoye by unanimous decision on 26 May to retain his Australian heavyweight title. His most publicised fight took place on 16 June, when Huni entered the ring against ex-rugby league player, turned professional boxer, Paul Gallen. In what was a bruising encounter, Huni controlled the fight and overcame his 39-year-old opponent in the 10th round after knocking him to the ground. The referee declared the fight over with Huni improving his record to 5–0 while handing Gallen his first defeat.

Huni was set to represent Australia at the 2020 Summer Olympics in Tokyo in the super-heavyweight division but was ruled out due to injury.

On 28 October 2023 in Cancún, Mexico, Huni faced Andrew Tabiti for the WBA International heavyweight title. He won the fight by unanimous decision.

On 8 March 2024 in Riyadh, Saudi Arabia, Huni defeated Kevin Lerena by unanimous decision.

Fighting at Fortitude Music Hall in Brisbane, he recorded second round stoppage wins over Troy Pilcher on 25 July 2024 and Leandro Daniel Robutti on 11 December 2024.

On 8 January 2025, Huni scored another second round stoppage success, this time over Shaun Potgieter at the Convention and Exhibition Centre on the Gold Coast.

Brought in as a replacement for Jarrell Miller, who pulled out of the bout on 30 April, Huni faced Fabio Wardley for the vacant WBA interim heavyweight title at Portman Road in Ipswich, England, on 7 June 2025. He was ahead on the scorecards when he was knocked out with a right hand in the 10th round. It was the first loss of Huni's career.

Huni beat Frazer Clarke on a majority decision over 10 rounds at Tottenham Hotspur Stadium in London on 11 April 2026.

== Professional boxing record ==
14 fights	13 wins	1 loss
By knockout	7	1
By decision	6	0

No.	Result	Record	Opponent	Type	Round, time	Date	Location	Notes
14	Win	13–1	Frazer Clarke	MD	10	11 Apr 2026	Tottenham Hotspur Stadium, London, England	
13	Loss	12–1	Fabio Wardley	KO	10 (12), 1:42	7 Jun 2025	Portman Road, Ipswich, England	For vacant WBA interim heavyweight title
12	Win	12–0	Shaun Potgieter	TKO	2 (10), 0:33	8 Jan 2025	Convention and Exhibition Centre, Gold Coast, Australia	Retained WBO Global heavyweight title; Won vacant IBF Pan Pacific heavyweight title
11	Win	11–0	Leandro Daniel Robutti	TKO	2 (8), 2:02	11 Dec 2024	Fortitude Music Hall, Brisbane, Australia	
10	Win	10–0	Troy Pilcher	TKO	2 (10), 2:26	25 July 2024	Fortitude Music Hall, Brisbane, Australia	Retained WBO Global heavyweight title
9	Win	9–0	Kevin Lerena	UD	10	8 Mar 2024	Kingdom Arena, Riyadh, Saudi Arabia	Won vacant WBO Global heavyweight title
8	Win	8–0	Andrew Tabiti	UD	10	28 Oct 2023	Polifórum Benito Juárez, Cancun, Mexico	Won vacant WBA International heavyweight title
7	Win	7–0	Kiki Toa Leutele	UD	10	4 Nov 2022	Nissan Arena, Brisbane, Australia	Retained IBF Pan Pacific, WBO Oriental, and OPBF heavyweight titles
6	Win	6–0	Joseph Goodall	UD	10	15 Jun 2022	Nissan Arena, Brisbane, Australia	Won vacant IBF Pan Pacific, WBO Oriental, and OPBF heavyweight titles
5	Win	5–0	Paul Gallen	TKO	10 (10), 1:18	16 Jun 2021	ICC Exhibition Centre, Sydney, Australia	Retained Australian heavyweight title
4	Win	4–0	Christian Ndzie Tsoye	UD	10	26 May 2021	ICC Exhibition Centre, Sydney, Australia	Retained Australian heavyweight title
3	Win	3–0	Jack Maris	TKO	1 (6), 2:50	10 Apr 2021	Convention and Exhibition Centre, Gold Coast, Australia	
2	Win	2–0	Arsene Fosso	TKO	4 (10), 1:07	3 Dec 2020	Fortitude Music Hall, Brisbane, Australia	Retained Australian heavyweight title
1	Win	1–0	Faiga Opelu	TKO	7 (10), 1:21	22 Oct 2020	Fortitude Music Hall, Brisbane, Australia	Won Australian heavyweight title

Sporting positions
Regional boxing titles
Preceded by Faiga Opelu	Australian heavyweight champion 22 October 2020 – present	Incumbent
