= Maxim Babanin =

Russian boxer (born 1988)

Maksim Babanin
Personal information
- Nationality: Russian
- Born: 7 October 1988 (age 37) Volgograd, Russian SFSR, Soviet Union
- Height: 1.83 m (6 ft 0 in)
- Weight: Heavyweight

Boxing career
- Stance: Orthodox

Boxing record
- Total fights: 6
- Wins: 6
- Win by KO: 4
Medal record
Men's amateur boxing
Representing Russia
World Championships
Bronze medal – third place	2019 Yekaterinburg	Super-heavyweight
European Championships
Bronze medal – third place	2017 Kharkiv	Super-heavyweight

Maxim Igorevich Babanin (Russian: Максим Игоревич Бабанин; born 7 October 1988) is a Russian professional boxer. As an amateur, he won bronze medals at the 2017 European Championships and 2019 World Championships.

== Amateur career ==
Babanin began his amateur career in 2007. In 2007 he competed in the European Junior Championship in Sombor and became the super-heavyweight champion, beating Tyson Fury, who would later become world heavyweight champion. As of 2022, Babanin was the last boxer to defeat Fury in amateur competition.

Between 2012 and 2017, Babanin competed in the World Series of Boxing, during which time he amassed a 9–3 record, and achieved a notable victory against Joe Joyce. In September 2019, Babanin participated in 2019 AIBA World Boxing Championships, competing in the super-heavyweight division. He earned his place in the semifinals by beating Fraser Clark on points, but lost his semifinal bout against Bakhodir Jalolov on points as well.

Between late November and early December 2020, Babanin competed in the Russian super heavyweight tournament, which was held to determine the Russian boxing representatives. He was able to beat Damila Sharafutdinov by split decision in the round of 16, Mark Petrovskii on points in the quarterfinals, but lost on points to Svyatoslav Teterin in the semifinals.

== Professional career ==
Babanin made his professional debut against Bogdan Rakich on 26 November 2021. He won the fight by stoppage, as Rakich retired from the fight at the end of the third round. A month later, on 17 December 2021, Babanin was booked to face Olivier Dounda Mekongo. He won the fight by a second-round technical knockout.

Babanin faced Evgeny Kirichenko in his first fight of 2022, which took place on 29 January 2022. He won the fight by a second-round knockout.

== Professional boxing record ==
6 fights	6 wins	0 losses
By knockout	4	0
By decision	2	0

No.	Result	Record	Opponent	Type	Round, time	Date	Location	Notes
6	Win	6–0	German Skobenko	UD	8	17 Aug 2023	KRK Uralets, Yekaterinburg, Russia	
5	Win	5–0	Yury Bykhautsou	UD	6	6 May 2023	KRK Uralets, Yekaterinburg, Russia	
4	Win	4–0	Evgeny Orlov	TKO	3 (6), 1:05	29 Apr 2022	Vegas City Hall, Krasnogorsk, Russia	
3	Win	3–0	Evgeny Kirichenko	TKO	2 (6), 0:52	29 Jan 2022	RCC Boxing Academy, Yekaterinburg, Russia	
2	Win	2–0	Olivier Dounda Mekongo	TKO	2 (6), 1:22	17 Dec 2021	Vysotsky Sports Palace, Samara, Russia	
1	Win	1–0	Bogdan Rakich	RTD	3 (6), 3:00	26 Nov 2021	Soviet Wings Sport Palace, Moscow, Russia	
