= Solomon Dacres =

English boxer (born 1993)

Personal information
- Nickname: The Real Deal
- Born: 25 October 1993 (age 32) Warley, England
- Height: 6 ft 5 in (196 cm)
- Weight: Heavyweight

Boxing career
- Stance: Orthodox

Boxing record
- Total fights: 12
- Wins: 10
- Win by KO: 3
- Losses: 2

Solomon Dacres is an English professional boxer. He is a former English heavyweight champion.

== Career ==
Dacres turned pro with an amateur record of 35–10 and made his debut on 15 May 2021 at Manchester Arena, comfortably winning on points against Mladen Manev over six rounds.

He won the vacant English heavyweight title with a second round stoppage win over Robert Ismay at Newcastle Arena on 18 March 2023. Dacres retained his title thanks to a majority decision victory against Michael Webster at Manchester Arena on 18 November 2023, before securing a seventh-round knockout success when the pair met for a rematch on 20 July 2024 at Resorts World Arena in Birmingham.

Dacres lost his title to David Adeleye when he was stopped in the first round of their fight at Wembley Arena in London on 7 December 2024.

He returned to winning ways in his next outing, defeating Vladyslav Sirenko by unanimous decision at Wembley Stadium in London on the undercard of Oleksandr Usyk vs. Daniel Dubois II on 19 July 2025.

Dacres faced two-time Olympic gold medalist Bakhodir Jalolov over 10 rounds at The O2 Arena in London on 17 October 2026. He was knocked to the canvas in the fifth round and, despite recovering to complete the fight, lost via unanimous decision.

== Professional boxing record ==
12 fights	10 wins	2 losses
By knockout	3	1
By decision	7	1

No.	Result	Record	Opponent	Type	Round, time	Date	Location	Notes
12	Loss	10–2	Bakhodir Jalolov	UD	10	17 Oct 2026	The O2 Arena, London, England	
11	Win	10–1	Vladyslav Sirenko	UD	10	19 Jul 2025	Wembley Stadium, London, England	
10	Loss	9–1	David Adeleye	TKO	1 (10), 1:20	7 Dec 2024	Wembley Arena, London, England	Lost English heavyweight title
9	Win	9–0	Michael Webster	TKO	7 (10), 1:10	20 Jul 2024	Resorts World Arena, Birmingham, England	Retained English heavyweight title
8	Win	8–0	Michael Webster	MD	10	18 Nov 2023	Manchester Arena, Manchester, England	Retained English heavyweight title
7	Win	7–0	Chris Thompson	UD	10	19 Aug 2023	Utilita Arena, Birmingham, England	
6	Win	6–0	Robert Ismay	TKO	2 (10), 2:04	18 Mar 2023	Newcastle Arena, Newcastle, England	Won vacant English heavyweight title
5	Win	5–0	Ariel Esteban Bracamonte	UD	10	24 Sep 2022	Nottingham Arena, Nottingham, England	
4	Win	4–0	Kevin Nicolas Espindola	PTS	8	9 Jul 2022	The O2 Arena, London, England	
3	Win	3–0	Kamil Sokolowski	PTS	8	9 Oct 2021	Echo Arena, Liverpool, England	
2	Win	2–0	Alvaro Terrero	TKO	4 (6), 1:36	12 Jun 2021	Vertu Motors Arena, Newcastle, England	
1	Win	1–0	Mladen Manev	PTS	6	15 May 2021	Manchester Arena, Manchester, England	
