= Miljan Rovcanin =

Serbian boxer

Miljan Rovčanin
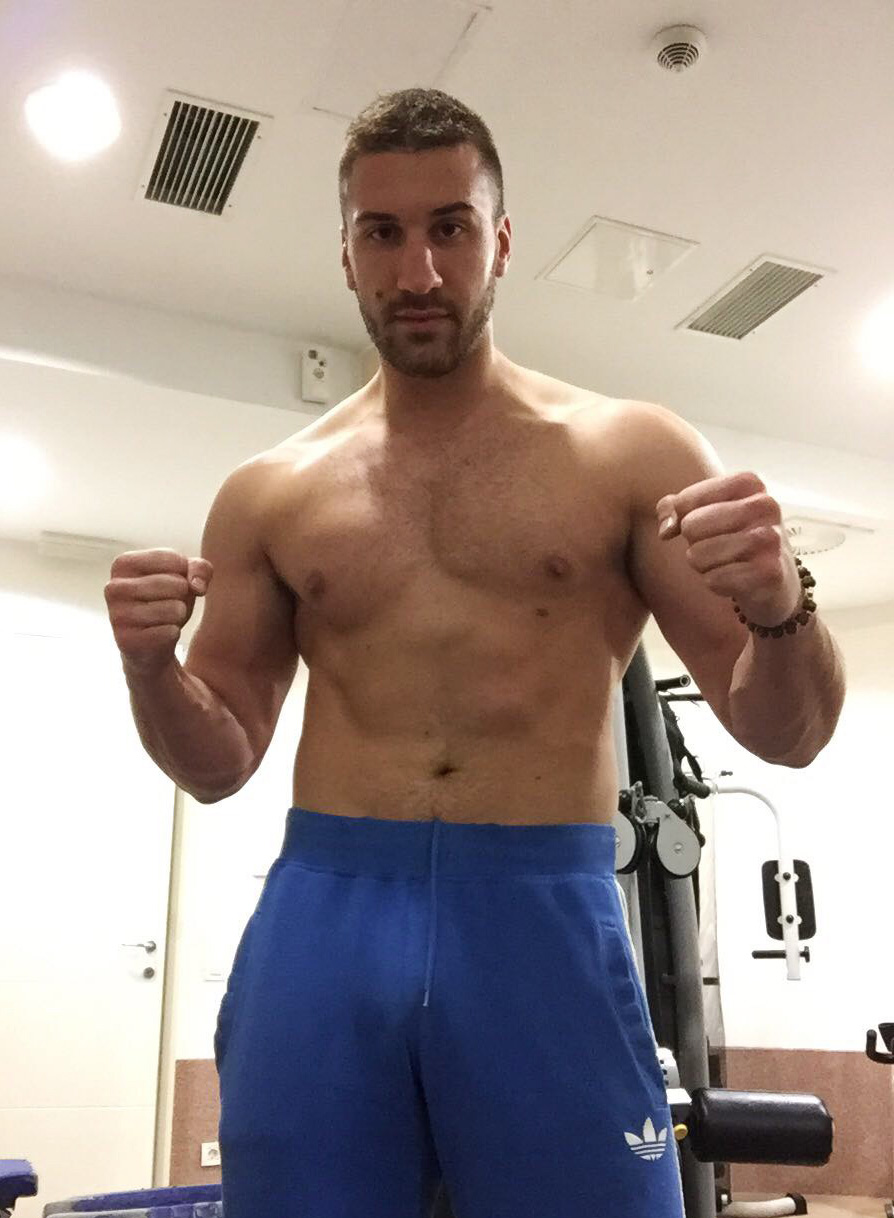

Personal information
- Nationality: Serbian
- Born: Miljan Rovcanin; 6 December 1993 (age 32) Bar, FR Yugoslavia
- Weight: Cruiserweight; Heavyweight

Boxing career
- Stance: Orthodox

Boxing record
- Total fights: 31
- Wins: 27
- Win by KO: 18
- Losses: 4
- Draws: 0

Miljan Rovcanin (born 6 December 1993) is a Serbian professional boxer.

== Early life and amateur career ==
Rovcanin was born in Bar, FR Yugoslavia. He had a very successful amateur career.

== Professional career ==
Rovacin began professional boxing at the age of eighteen and became the youngest cruiserweight professional boxer in 2012. He won the 2012 World Boxing Foundation International Title in the cruiserweight division at the age of eighteen. On 21 April 2017, he faced Serbian boxer Dusan Krstin at Hall of Sports in Zaječar and won the Serbian Heavyweight Title.

=== Rovcanin vs. Dimitrenko ===
Heavyweight contender Alexander Dimitrenko (40–3–1, 26 KOs), ranked #11 by the IBF, surprisingly fought to a 10 round draw against little known replacement opponent Miljan Rovcanin (18–0–1, 13 KOs). Dimitrenko was originally scheduled to fight Adnan Redzovic, but Adnan dropped out. It was confirmed that Rovcanin and Dimitrenko would fight on 22 Dec 2017 on at the Edel-Optics.de Arena in Hamburg, Germany. The scores were 96–90 for Dimitrenko, and 94–92 for Rovcanin, The third judge scored it 93–93. In the 2nd round, Rovcanin did a lot of holding to stifle Dimitrenko’s offense. Rovcanin threw a lot of weak jabs, and used movement to keep out of range. Dimitrenko missed a lot of shots, and looked confused. Rovcanin did the better work in the first half of the fight against a clearly over-the-hill Dimitrenko. In rounds 8, 9 and 10, Rovcanin gassed out badly and let Dimitrenko get back into the fight. The German Federation (the BDB) later acted upon an official protest from EC Boxing and Dimitrenko, changing the result in the fight to a win for Dimitrenko, handing Rovcanin his first career defeat. The reason for the change was that Rovcanin had a total of three points deducted. Two in the third round and one in the seventh during the fight and according to the BDB rules he should have been disqualified in the seventh when the third point deduction was made.

== Professional boxing record ==
31 fights	27 wins	4 losses
By knockout	18	3
By decision	9	0
By disqualification	0	1

No.	Result	Record	Opponent	Type	Round, time	Date	Location	Notes
24	Loss	21–3	(United States) Jared Anderson	KO	2 (8)	27 Aug, 2022	(United States) Hard Rock Hotel & Casino, Tulsa, Oklahoma, U.S.	
23	Win	21–2	(Serbia) Dusan Krstin	UD	8	21 Dec, 2019	Nikoljac, Bijelo Polje, Montenegro	
22	Win	20–2	(Serbia) Slobodan Culum	TKO	1 (6)	31 May 2019	Hall of Sports, Belgrade, Serbia	
21	Loss	19–2	(Germany) Agit Kabayel	TKO	3 (12), 2:25	21 Apr, 2018	(Germany) Estrel Convention Center, Neukölln	For European Union heavyweight title
20	Win	19–1	(Bosnia and Herzegovina) Drazan Janjanin	TKO	2 (6), 3:00	11 Mar, 2018	Sport Hall "Dordje Predin - Badza", Bečej, Serbia	
19	Loss	18–1	(Germany) Alexander Dimitrenko	DQ	10	22 Dec 2017	Alsterdorfer Sporthalle, Hamburg, Germany	Originally an SD, later ruled a DQ win for Dimitrenko
18	Win	18–0	(Serbia) Sejfula Berisa	TKO	2 (6), 0:49	20 May 2017	Hotel Bali Colosseum, Belgrade, Serbia	
17	Win	17–0	(Serbia) Dusan Krstin	UD	10	21 Apr 2017	Hall of Sports, Zaječar, Serbia	Won vacant Serbia Heavyweight Title
16	Win	16–0	(Hungary) Denes Toth	KO	1 (6)	29 Jun 2016	Fortress Amphitheater, Niš, Serbia	
15	Win	15–0	(Bosnia and Herzegovina) Adis Dadovic	TKO	2 (6)	18 Dec 2015	Mediterranean Sports Centre, Budva, Montenegro	
14	Win	14–0	(Serbia) Milos Dovedan	TKO	2 (6)	28 Nov 2015	Hotel Bali Paradiso, Belgrade, Serbia	
13	Win	13–0	(Croatia) Petar Mrvalj	TKO	2 (6)	7 Dec 2014	Sport Hall "Dordje Predin - Badza", Bečej, Serbia	
12	Win	12–0	(Romania) Costantin Marian Armenga	KO	3 (6)	22 Nov 2014	School Hall, Srebrenica, Bosnia and Herzegovina	
11	Win	11–0	(Croatia) Marko Martinjak	PTS	6 (6)	25 Oct 2014	Mediterranean Sports Centre, Budva, Montenegro	
10	Win	10–0	(Serbia) Misa Nikolic	KO	1 (10)	28 Dec 2013	Hala Pendik, Novi Pazar, Serbia	Won vacant World Boxing Foundation International Cruiserweight Title
9	Win	9–0	(Hungary) Attila Makula	TKO	6 (6), 1:09	01 Dec 2013	Bečej, Serbia	
8	Win	8–0	(Romania) Ion Voica	KO	1 (6), 1:22	29 Jun 2013	Hotel Bali Paradiso, Belgrade, Serbia	
7	Win	7–0	(Serbia) Adis Dadovic	PTS	6	20 May 2013	Hotel Bali Paradiso, Belgrade, Serbia	
6	Win	6–0	(Croatia) Elvir Behlulovic	PTS	4	9 Dec 2012	Hall of Sport, Belgrade, Serbia	
5	Win	5–0	(Romania) Ion Voica	UD	4	10 Nov 2012	(North Macedonia) Centar za kultura Marko Cepenkov, Prilep, Macedonia	
4	Win	4–0	(Bosnia and Herzegovina) Sanid Imamovic	UD	4	7 Oct 2012	(North Macedonia) Boris Trajkovski Sports Arena, Skopje, Macedonia	
3	Win	3–0	(Bulgaria) Nikolai Ermenkov	TKO	2 (4) 0:44	16 Jun 2012	Güssing, Austria	
2	Win	2–0	(Tanzania) Mbaruku Kheri	TKO	3 (4), 0:00	18 May 2012	Hall of Sport, Belgrade, Serbia	
1	Win	1–0	(Serbia) Attila Dudas	TKO	2 (4), 2:10	30 Mar 2012	(Serbia) Hotel Jugoslavija, Belgrade, Belgrade	Professional debut
