= Jeamie Tshikeva =

English boxer (born 1993)

Personal information
- Nickname: Jeamie TKV
- Born: Jeamie Tshikeva Kimbembi; 11 November 1993 (age 32) Tottenham, London, England
- Height: 6 ft 4 in (193 cm)

Boxing career
- Weight class: Heavyweight
- Stance: Orthodox

Boxing record
- Total fights: 12
- Wins: 9
- Win by KO: 5
- Losses: 3
Medal record
Men's amateur boxing
Representing Democratic Republic of the Congo
African Games
Silver medal – second place	2019 Rabat	+91kg

Jeamie Tshikeva (born 11 November 1993), known professionally as Jeamie TKV, is an English professional boxer. He held the British heavyweight title from November 2025 to April 2026.

== Professional career ==
After 72 amateur bouts during which he represented both England and the Democratic Republic of Congo, Tshikeva turned professional in 2022.

He won the vacant IBO International heavyweight title when his opponent, Michael Webster, retired at the end of the ninth round of their fight at Wembley Arena in London on 1 February 2025.

Tshikeva faced David Adeleye for the vacant British heavyweight title at Co-op Live in Manchester on 5 April 2025. He lost by technical knockout in the sixth round. Following the fight, Tshikeva's promotor, Ben Shalom, launched an appeal for the result to be overturned, claiming the first of the two knockdowns his boxer suffered in the sixth round had been from a punch received after the referee called break. A few days later, the British Boxing Board of Control ordered an immediate rematch take place.

On 29 November 2025, Tshikeva was given a second chance at the once again vacant British heavyweight title when he took on Frazer Clarke at Valiant Live in Derby. He won by split decision with the judges' scorecards reading 115–112, 115–113 and 112–115.

On 11 April 2026, Tshikeva lost his British title to Richard Riakporhe by fifth round technical knockout at Tottenham Hotspur Stadium in London.

== Personal life ==
Tshikeva's parents moved to England from the Democratic Republic of Congo, then called Zaire, in 1991.

Having excelled at wrestling at a young age under the guidance of his father Makasi, who was known as Big Papa T as a professional, Tshikeva decided to take up boxing at the age of 18, taking part in 72 amateur fights.

He has a degree in film and television studies from Middlesex University.

== Professional boxing record ==
12 fights	9 wins	3 losses
By knockout	5	3
By decision	4	0

Key to abbreviations used for results
DQ	Disqualification	RTD	Corner retirement
KO	Knockout	SD	Split decision / split draw
MD	Majority decision / majority draw	TD	Technical decision / technical draw
NC	No contest	TKO	Technical knockout
PTS	Points decision	UD	Unanimous decision / unanimous draw

Boxing record
No.	Result	Record	Opponent	Type	Round(s), time	Date	Location	Notes
12	Loss	9–3	Richard Riakporhe	TKO	5 (12), 2:12	11 Apr 2026	Tottenham Hotspur Stadium, London, England	Lost British heavyweight title
11	Win	9–2	Frazer Clarke	SD	12	29 Nov 2025	Vaillant Live, Derby, England	Won vacant British heavyweight title
10	Loss	8–2	David Adeleye	TKO	6 (12), 0:55	5 Apr 2025	Co-op Live, Manchester, England	For vacant British heavyweight title
9	Win	8–1	Michael Webster	RTD	9 (10), 3:00	1 Feb 2025	Wembley Arena, London, England	Won vacant IBO International heavyweight title
8	Win	7–1	Franklin Ignatius	TKO	6 (10), 2:32	19 Oct 2024	Copper Box Arena, London, England	
7	Win	6–1	Kostiantyn Dovbyshchenko	PTS	6	3 Feb 2024	Wembley Arena, London, England	
6	Loss	5–1	Igor Adiel Macedo	TKO	6 (8), 1:11	30 Sep 2023	York Hall, London, England	
5	Win	5–0	Michal Boloz	KO	2 (6), 1:57	22 April 2023	G2A Arena, Rzeszów, Poland	
4	Win	4–0	Harry Armstrong	PTS	8	11 Feb 2023	Wembley Arena, London, England	
3	Win	3–0	Joel Ducille	KO	1 (6), 1:30	27 Nov 2022	Alexandra Palace, London, England	
2	Win	2–0	Jake Darnell	TKO	1 (6), 2:47	11 Jun 2022	Wembley Arena, London, England	
1	Win	1–0	Alvaro Terrero	PTS	4	26 Mar 2022	Wembley Arena, London, England	
