= Vladyslav Sirenko =

Ukrainian boxer (born 1995)

Personal information
- Nationality: Ukrainian
- Born: 7 February 1995 (age 31) Kyiv, Ukraine
- Height: 6 ft 3 1/2 in (192 cm)
- Weight: Heavyweight

Boxing career
- Stance: Orthodox

Boxing record
- Total fights: 23
- Wins: 23
- Win by KO: 20
- Losses: 1
Medal record
Men's amateur boxing
Representing Ukraine
European Youth Championships
Silver medal – second place	2013 Rotterdam	Super-heavyweight
Ukrainian National Championships
Bronze medal – third place	2014 Kyiv	Super-heavyweight

Vladyslav Hennadiyovych Sirenko (Ukrainian: Владислав Геннадійович Сіренко; born 7 February 1995) is a Ukrainian professional boxer. As an amateur, he won a silver medal in the super-heavyweight division at the 2013 European Youth Championships.

== Amateur career ==
Sirenko compiled an amateur record of 125–25. His highlights included winning gold medals at the 2012 and 2013 Ukrainian Youth Championships, and a silver medal at the 2013 European Youth Championships.

== Professional career ==
Sirenko made his professional debut on 26 May 2017, scoring a first-round knockout (KO) over Emmanuel Mnengi at the Sibaya Casino & Entertainment Kingdom near Durban, South Africa.

He suffered his first defeat as a professional against Solomon Dacres at Wembley Stadium in London, England, on 19 July 2025, losing by unanimous decision.

Sirenko got back to winning ways in his next fight by knocking out Otto Wallin in the last second of the 10th and final round at The Theater at Madison Square Garden in New York City, United States, on 26 July 2026. Wallin required medical attention in the ring and was taken back to the dressing rooms on a stretcher before being transported to hospital.

== Professional boxing record ==
24 fights	23 wins	1 loss
By knockout	20	0
By decision	3	1

No.	Result	Record	Opponent	Type	Round, time	Date	Location	Notes
24	Win	23–1	Otto Wallin	KO	10 (10), 2:59	26 Jul 2026	The Theater at Madison Square Garden, New York City, New York, US	
23	Loss	22–1	Solomon Dacres	UD	10	19 Jul 2025	Wembley Stadium, London, England	
22	Win	22–0	Brandon Carmack	TKO	4 (10), 0:27	1 Oct 2024	Texas Troubadour Theatre, Nashville, Tennessee, US	
21	Win	21–0	Keith Barr	TKO	4 (6), 2:00	4 Jun 2024	Texas Troubadour Theatre, Nashville, Tennessee, US	
20	Win	20–0	Deon Ronny Hale	TKO	3 (6), 1:41	2 Apr 2024	Texas Troubadour Theatre, Nashville, Tennessee, US	
19	Win	19–0	Andriy Rudenko	TKO	6 (10)	18 Dec 2021	Terminal Ice Palace, Brovary, Ukraine	Retained WBC–ABCO heavyweight titles; Won vacant WBO Asia Pacific heavyweight title
18	Win	18–0	Alexander Ustinov	KO	1 (10), 1:10	10 Sep 2021	Stade Roland Garros, Paris, France	Retained WBC–ABCO heavyweight titles
17	Win	17–0	Newfel Ouatah	KO	4 (8), 0:50	12 Jun 2021	AKKO International, Kyiv, Ukraine	
16	Win	16–0	Kamil Sokołowski	UD	8	6 Mar 2021	AKKO International, Kyiv, Ukraine	
15	Win	15–0	Kostiantyn Dovbyshchenko	UD	10	13 Dec 2020	Oleksandr Dovzhenko National Film Studio, Kyiv, Ukraine	Won vacant WBC–ABCO heavyweight title
14	Win	14–0	Pavlo Krolenko	RTD	4 (8), 3:00	1 Aug 2020	Equides Club, Lesniki, Ukraine	
13	Win	13–0	Ivan Di Berardino	TKO	1 (10), 2:59	11 Oct 2019	Palazzohalle, Karlsruhe, Germany	Won vacant EBP heavyweight title
12	Win	12–0	Denis Bakhtov	TKO	7 (8), 1:43	23 Jun 2019	Menlyn Time Square, Pretoria, South Africa	
11	Win	11–0	Leandro Daniel Robutti	KO	1 (10), 2:01	27 Apr 2019	Palazzohalle, Karlsruhe, Germany	Won vacant German International heavyweight title
10	Win	10–0	Marcelo Nascimento	KO	3 (8), 1:16	15 Dec 2018	Parkovy Convention Centre, Kyiv, Ukraine	
9	Win	9–0	Rocky Kaleng	TKO	1 (8), 2:11	26 Aug 2018	Menlyn Time Square, Pretoria, South Africa	
8	Win	8–0	Knife Didier	TKO	1 (10), 0:57	29 Jun 2018	Mistico Equestrian Center, Cape Town, South Africa	Won vacant WBF International heavyweight title
7	Win	7–0	Alick Gogodo	TKO	1 (6)	25 May 2018	Portuguese Hall, Johannesburg, South Africa	
6	Win	6–0	Laszlo Toth	KO	1 (8), 2:30	16 Mar 2018	Hallmann Dome, Vienna, Austria	
5	Win	5–0	Collen Mavhundutse	KO	1 (4), 0:59	23 Feb 2018	Emerald Casino, Vanderbijlpark, South Africa	
4	Win	4–0	Terrell Jamal Woods	UD	6	10 Nov 2017	Arabia Shrine Center, Houston, Texas, US	
3	Win	3–0	Jani Kagura	KO	1 (4), 0:20	23 Jun 2017	Cape Sun Hotel, Cape Town, South Africa	
2	Win	2–0	Peto Kapela	TKO	1 (4)	16 Jun 2017	Turfontein Race Course, Johannesburg, South Africa	
1	Win	1–0	Emmanuel Mnengi	KO	1 (4)	26 May 2017	Sibaya Casino & Ent. Kingdom, Durban, South Africa	
