= Czech Republic at the 2023 World Athletics Championships =

- Flag of Czech Republic
- WA code: CZE

in Budapest, Hungary 19 August 2023 – 27 August 2023
- Competitors: 23 (10 men and 13 women)
- Medals Ranked 37th: Gold 0 Silver 0 Bronze 2 Total 2

World Athletics Championships appearances
- 1993; 1995; 1997; 1999; 2001; 2003; 2005; 2007; 2009; 2011; 2013; 2015; 2017; 2019; 2022; 2023; 2025

The Czech Republic competed at the 2023 World Athletics Championships in Budapest, Hungary, from 19 to 27 August 2023.

== Medallists ==
Medal	Name	Event	Date
Bronze	Matěj Krsek; Tereza Petržilková; Patrik Šorm; Lada Vondrová	Mixed 4 × 400 metres relay	19 August
Bronze	Jakub Vadlejch	Men's javelin throw	27 August

== Results ==
Czech Republic entered 23 athletes.

Key

- Q = Qualified for the next round
- q = Qualified for the next round as a fastest loser or, in field events, by position without achieving the qualifying target
- NR = National record
- PB = Personal best
- SB = Season best
- N/A = Round not applicable for the event

=== Men ===
Track and road events

Athlete	Event	Heat		Semifinal		Final	
Athlete	Event	Result	Rank	Result	Rank	Result	Rank
Ondřej Macík	200 metres	20.40	3 Q	20.71	8	Did not advance	
Matěj Krsek	400 metres	45.99	6	Did not advance			
Vít Müller	400 metres hurdles	49.37	7	Did not advance			
Matěj Krsek; Pavel Maslák; Vít Müller; Patrik Šorm	4 × 400 metres relay	3:00.99	6 NR	—N/a		Did not advance	

Field events

Athlete	Event	Qualification		Final	
Athlete	Event	Distance	Position	Distance	Position
Radek Juška	Long jump	8.10	9 q	7.98	7
Tomáš Staněk	Shot put	20.41	16	Did not advance	
Patrik Hájek	Hammer throw	68.77	32	Did not advance	
Jakub Vadlejch	Javelin throw	83.50	3 Q	86.67	3rd place, bronze medalist(s)

=== Women ===
Track and road events

Athlete	Event	Heat		Semifinal		Final	
Athlete	Event	Result	Rank	Result	Rank	Result	Rank
Tereza Petržilková	400 metres	51.30	3 Q	51.94	8	Did not advance	
Lada Vondrová	400 metres	50.92 PB	4 q	51.50	7	Did not advance	
Kristiina Mäki	1500 metres	4:06.90	9	Did not advance			
Moira Stewartová	Marathon	—N/a				2:34:02	26
Nikoleta Jíchová	400 metres hurdles	55.10	4 Q	55.01	6	Did not advance	
Eliška Martínková	20 kilometres walk	—N/a				1:34:02	27
Tereza Ďurdiaková	35 kilometres walk	—N/a				2:49:06 NR	10

Field events

Athlete	Event	Qualification		Final	
Athlete	Event	Distance	Position	Distance	Position
Michaela Hrubá	High jump	1.85	20	Did not advance	
Amálie Švábíková	Pole vault	4.65	7 Q	4.50	11
Irena Gillarová	Javelin throw	54.15	32	Did not advance	
Nikola Ogrodníková	Javelin throw	54.59	28	Did not advance	
Nikol Tabačková	Javelin throw	55.45	24	Did not advance	

=== Mixed ===
Track events

Athlete	Event	Heat		Final	
Athlete	Event	Result	Rank	Result	Rank
Matěj Krsek; Tereza Petržilková; Patrik Šorm; Lada Vondrová	4 × 400 metres relay	3:12.52	6 Q	3:11.98 NR	3rd place, bronze medalist(s)
