= Great Britain and Northern Ireland at the World Athletics Championships =

- WA code: GBR
- National federation: UK Athletics
- Website: www.britishathletics.org.uk
- Medals Ranked 7th: Gold 33 Silver 43 Bronze 50 Total 126

World Athletics Championships appearances (overview)
- 1976; 1980; 1983; 1987; 1991; 1993; 1995; 1997; 1999; 2001; 2003; 2005; 2007; 2009; 2011; 2013; 2015; 2017; 2019; 2022; 2023; 2025

Great Britain and Northern Ireland has participated in all the World Athletics Championships since the events beginning in 1983 as the IAAF World Championships in Athletics. The team also took part in the two minor championship events under the same name for non-Olympic disciplines in 1977 and 1980, without winning a medal. The team is 7th on the all time medal table

Mo Farah is the most successful British Athlete in championships history, as well as the most successful distance runner in the history of the championships with six gold and two silver medals split evenly between 5000 metres and 10,000 metres; only Usain Bolt has won more individual gold medals than Farah. Jessica Ennis-Hill is the most successful British female athlete with three gold medals in . Farah and Christine Ohuruogu, with two gold, a silver and five bronze medals are the most decorated British athletes in championships history with eight medals apiece. Great Britain's most successful event has been Heptathlon with five gold medals, and nine medals. The individual event with most different British gold medalists is the men's 1500 metres, won by three men; Steve Cram in 1983, Jake Wightman in 2022 and Josh Kerr in 2023.

Great Britain and Northern Ireland have won at least one gold medal in all but two editions of the main championships; 2003 in Paris and 2025 in Tokyo.

== Medallists ==
Medal	Name	Year	Event
Gold	Steve Cram	1983 Helsinki	Men's 1500 metres
Gold	Daley Thompson	1983 Helsinki	Men's decathlon
Silver	Joan Baptiste; Kathy Cook; Beverley Callender; Shirley Thomas	1983 Helsinki	Women's 4 × 100 metres relay
Silver	Fatima Whitbread	1983 Helsinki	Women's javelin throw
Bronze	Colin Reitz	1983 Helsinki	Men's 3000 metres steeplechase
Bronze	Ainsley Bennett; Garry Cook; Todd Bennett; Phil Brown; Kriss Akabusi*	1983 Helsinki	Men's 4 × 400 metres relay
Bronze	Kathy Cook	1983 Helsinki	Women's 200 metres
Gold	Fatima Whitbread	1987 Rome	Women's javelin throw
Silver	Peter Elliott	1987 Rome	Men's 800 metres
Silver	Jonathan Ridgeon	1987 Rome	Men's 110 metres hurdles
Silver	Derek Redmond; Kriss Akabusi; Roger Black; Phil Brown; Todd Bennett*; Mark Thomas*	1987 Rome	Men's 4 × 400 metres relay
Bronze	Linford Christie	1987 Rome	Men's 100 metres
Bronze	John Regis	1987 Rome	Men's 200 metres
Bronze	Jack Buckner	1987 Rome	Men's 5000 metres
Bronze	Colin Jackson	1987 Rome	Men's 110 metres hurdles
Gold	Roger Black; Derek Redmond; John Regis; Kriss Akabusi; Ade Mafe*; Mark Richardson*	1991 Tokyo	Men's 4 × 400 metres relay
Gold	Liz McColgan	1991 Tokyo	Women's 10,000 metres
Silver	Roger Black	1991 Tokyo	Men's 400 metres
Silver	Sally Gunnell	1991 Tokyo	Women's 400 metres hurdles
Bronze	Tony Jarrett	1991 Tokyo	Men's 110 metres hurdles
Bronze	Kriss Akabusi	1991 Tokyo	Men's 400 metres hurdles
Bronze	Tony Jarrett; John Regis; Darren Braithwaite; Linford Christie	1991 Tokyo	Men's 4 × 100 metres relay
Gold	Linford Christie	1993 Stuttgart	Men's 100 metres
Gold	Colin Jackson	1993 Stuttgart	Men's 110 metres hurdles
Gold	Sally Gunnell	1993 Stuttgart	Women's 400 metres hurdles
Silver	John Regis	1993 Stuttgart	Men's 200 metres
Silver	Tony Jarrett	1993 Stuttgart	Men's 110 metres hurdles
Silver	Colin Jackson; Tony Jarrett; John Regis; Linford Christie; Jason John*; Darren Braithwaite*	1993 Stuttgart	Men's 4 × 100 metres relay
Bronze	Jonathan Edwards	1993 Stuttgart	Men's triple jump
Bronze	Steve Smith	1993 Stuttgart	Men's high jump
Bronze	Mick Hill	1993 Stuttgart	Men's javelin throw
Bronze	Linda Keough; Phylis Smith; Tracy Goddard; Sally Gunnell	1993 Stuttgart	Women's 4 × 400 metres relay
Gold	Jonathan Edwards	1995 Gothenburg	Men's triple jump
Silver	Tony Jarrett	1995 Gothenburg	Men's 110 metres hurdles
Silver	Steve Backley	1995 Gothenburg	Men's javelin throw
Silver	Kelly Holmes	1995 Gothenburg	Women's 1500 metres
Bronze	Kelly Holmes	1995 Gothenburg	Women's 800 metres
Gold	Iwan Thomas; Roger Black; Jamie Baulch; Mark Richardson; Mark Hylton*	1997 Athens	Men's 4 × 400 metres relay
Silver	Colin Jackson	1997 Athens	Men's 110 metres hurdles
Silver	Jonathan Edwards	1997 Athens	Men's triple jump
Silver	Steve Backley	1997 Athens	Men's javelin throw
Silver	Denise Lewis	1997 Athens	Women's heptathlon
Bronze	Darren Braithwaite; Darren Campbell; Douglas Walker; Julian Golding; Marlon Devonish*; Dwain Chambers*	1997 Athens	Men's 4 × 100 metres relay
Gold	Colin Jackson	1999 Seville	Men's 110 metres hurdles
Silver	Jason Gardener; Darren Campbell; Marlon Devonish; Dwain Chambers	1999 Seville	Men's 4 × 100 metres relay
Silver	Dean Macey	1999 Seville	Men's decathlon
Silver	Paula Radcliffe	1999 Seville	Women's 10,000 metres
Silver	Denise Lewis	1999 Seville	Women's heptathlon
Bronze	Dwain Chambers	1999 Seville	Men's 100 metres
Bronze	Jonathan Edwards	1999 Seville	Men's triple jump
Gold	Jonathan Edwards	2001 Edmonton	Men's triple jump
Bronze	Dean Macey	2001 Edmonton	Men's decathlon
Silver	Kelly Holmes	2003 Paris	Women's 800 metres
Bronze	Darren Campbell	2003 Paris	Men's 100 metres
Bronze	Hayley Tullett	2003 Paris	Women's 1500 metres
Gold	Paula Radcliffe	2005 Helsinki	Women's marathon
Bronze	Jason Gardener; Marlon Devonish; Christian Malcolm; Mark Lewis-Francis	2005 Helsinki	Men's 4 × 100 metres relay
Bronze	Lee McConnell; Donna Fraser; Nicola Sanders; Christine Ohuruogu	2005 Helsinki	Women's 4 × 400 metres relay
Gold	Christine Ohuruogu	2007 Osaka	Women's 400 metres
Silver	Nicola Sanders	2007 Osaka	Women's 400 metres
Bronze	Christian Malcolm; Craig Pickering; Marlon Devonish; Mark Lewis-Francis	2007 Osaka	Men's 4 × 100 metres relay
Bronze	Jo Pavey	2007 Osaka	Women's 10,000 metres
Bronze	Christine Ohuruogu; Marilyn Okoro; Lee McConnell; Nicola Sanders; Donna Fraser*	2007 Osaka	Women's 4 × 400 metres relay
Bronze	Kelly Sotherton	2007 Osaka	Women's heptathlon
Gold	Phillips Idowu	2009 Berlin	Men's triple jump
Gold	Jessica Ennis	2009 Berlin	Women's heptathlon
Silver	Conrad Williams; Michael Bingham; Robert Tobin; Martyn Rooney; Dai Greene*	2009 Berlin	Men's 4 × 400 metres relay
Silver	Lisa Dobriskey	2009 Berlin	Women's 1500 metres
Bronze	Simeon Williamson; Tyrone Edgar; Marlon Devonish; Harry Aikines-Aryeetey	2009 Berlin	Men's 4 × 100 metres relay
Bronze	Jenny Meadows	2009 Berlin	Women's 800 metres
Bronze	Lee McConnell; Christine Ohuruogu; Vicki Barr; Nicola Sanders	2009 Berlin	Women's 4 × 400 metres relay
Gold	Mo Farah	2011 Daegu	Men's 5000 metres
Gold	Dai Greene	2011 Daegu	Men's 400 metres hurdles
Gold	Jessica Ennis	2011 Daegu	Women's heptathlon
Silver	Mo Farah	2011 Daegu	Men's 10,000 metres
Silver	Phillips Idowu	2011 Daegu	Men's triple jump
Silver	Hannah England	2011 Daegu	Women's 1500 metres
Bronze	Andy Turner	2011 Daegu	Men's 110 metres hurdles
Bronze	Perri Shakes-Drayton; Nicola Sanders; Christine Ohuruogu; Lee McConnell	2011 Daegu	Women's 4 × 400 metres relay
Gold	Mo Farah	2013 Moscow	Men's 5000 metres
Gold	Mo Farah	2013 Moscow	Men's 10,000 metres
Gold	Christine Ohuruogu	2013 Moscow	Women's 400 metres
Silver	Eilidh Child; Shana Cox; Margaret Adeoye; Christine Ohuruogu	2013 Moscow	Women's 4 × 400 metres relay
Bronze	Conrad Williams; Martyn Rooney; Michael Bingham; Nigel Levine; Jamie Bowie*	2013 Moscow	Men's 4 × 400 metres relay
Bronze	Tiffany Porter	2013 Moscow	Women's 100 metres hurdles
Bronze	Dina Asher-Smith; Ashleigh Nelson; Annabelle Lewis; Hayley Jones	2013 Moscow	Women's 4 × 100 metres relay
Gold	Mo Farah	2015 Beijing	Men's 5000 metres
Gold	Mo Farah	2015 Beijing	Men's 10,000 metres
Gold	Greg Rutherford	2015 Beijing	Men's long jump
Gold	Jessica Ennis-Hill	2015 Beijing	Women's heptathlon
Silver	Shara Proctor	2015 Beijing	Women's long jump
Bronze	Rabah Yousif; Delano Williams; Jarryd Dunn; Martyn Rooney	2015 Beijing	Men's 4 × 400 metres relay
Bronze	Christine Ohuruogu; Anyika Onuora; Eilidh Child; Seren Bundy-Davies; Kirsten McAslan*	2015 Beijing	Women's 4 × 400 metres relay
Gold	Mo Farah	2017 London	Men's 10,000 metres
Gold	Chijindu Ujah; Adam Gemili; Danny Talbot; Nethaneel Mitchell-Blake	2017 London	Men's 4 × 100 metres relay
Silver	Mo Farah	2017 London	Men's 5000 metres
Silver	Asha Philip; Desirèe Henry; Dina Asher-Smith; Daryll Neita	2017 London	Women's 4 × 100 metres relay
Silver	Zoey Clark; Laviai Nielsen; Eilidh Doyle; Emily Diamond; Perri Shakes-Drayton*	2017 London	Women's 4 × 400 metres relay
Bronze	Matthew Hudson-Smith; Rabah Yousif; Dwayne Cowan; Martyn Rooney; Jack Green*	2017 London	Men's 4 × 400 metres relay
Gold	Dina Asher-Smith	2019 Doha	Women's 200 metres
Gold	Katarina Johnson-Thompson	2019 Doha	Women's heptathlon
Silver	Dina Asher-Smith	2019 Doha	Women's 100 metres
Silver	Adam Gemili; Zharnel Hughes; Richard Kilty; Nethaneel Mitchell-Blake	2019 Doha	Men's 4 × 100 metres relay
Silver	Asha Philip; Dina Asher-Smith; Ashleigh Nelson; Daryll Neita; Imani-Lara Lansiquot*	2019 Doha	Women's 4 × 100 metres relay
Gold	Jake Wightman	2022 Eugene	Men's 1500 metres
Silver	Keely Hodgkinson	2022 Eugene	Women's 800 metres
Bronze	Laura Muir	2022 Eugene	Women's 1500 metres
Bronze	Dina Asher-Smith	2022 Eugene	Women's 200 metres
Bronze	Matthew Hudson-Smith	2022 Eugene	Men's 400 metres
Bronze	Jona Efoloko; Zharnel Hughes; Nethaneel Mitchell-Blake; Reece Prescod; Adam Gemili*	2022 Eugene	Men's 4 × 100 metres relay
Bronze	Victoria Ohuruogu; Nicole Yeargin; Jessie Knight; Laviai Nielsen; Ama Pipi*	2022 Eugene	Women's 4 × 400 metres relay
Gold	Katarina Johnson-Thompson	2023 Budapest	Women's heptathlon
Gold	Josh Kerr	2023 Budapest	Men's 1500 metres
Silver	Lewis Davey; Laviai Nielsen; Rio Mitcham; Yemi Mary John; Joe Brier	2023 Budapest	Mixed 4 x 400 metres relay
Silver	Matthew Hudson-Smith	2023 Budapest	Men's 400 metres
Silver	Keely Hodgkinson	2023 Budapest	Women's 800 metres
Bronze	Zharnel Hughes	2023 Budapest	Men's 100 metres
Bronze	Ben Pattison	2023 Budapest	Men's 800 metres
Bronze	Asha Philip; Imani Lansiquot; Bianca Williams; Daryll Neita; Annie Tagoe	2023 Budapest	Women's 4 × 100 metres relay
Bronze	Alex Haydock-Wilson; Charlie Dobson; Lewis Davey; Rio Mitcham	2023 Budapest	Men's 4 x 400 metres relay
Bronze	Laviai Nielsen; Amber Anning; Ama Pipi; Nicole Yeargin; Yemi Mary John	2023 Budapest	Women's 4 × 400 metres relay
Silver	Jake Wightman	2025 Tokyo	Men's 1500 metres
Silver	Amy Hunt	2025 Tokyo	Women's 200 metres
Silver	Georgia Hunter Bell	2025 Tokyo	Women's 800 metres
Bronze	Keely Hodgkinson	2025 Tokyo	Women's 800 metres
Bronze	Katarina Johnson-Thompson	2025 Tokyo	Women's heptathlon

== Medal tables ==
=== By championships ===
Games	Athletes	Gold	Silver	Bronze	Total	Rank
1983 Helsinki	-	2	2	3	7	6
1987 Rome	-	1	3	4	8	7
1991 Tokyo	-	2	2	3	7	5
1993 Stuttgart	-	3	3	4	10	4
1995 Gothenburg	-	1	3	1	5	13
1997 Athens	-	1	4	1	6	10
1999 Seville	-	1	4	2	7	12
2001 Edmonton	-	1	0	1	2	19
2003 Paris	-	0	1	2	3	29
2005 Helsinki	-	1	0	2	3	16
2007 Osaka	60	1	1	4	6	11
2009 Berlin	60	2	2	3	7	8
2011 Daegu	59	3	3	2	8	6
2013 Moscow	60	3	1	3	7	7
2015 Beijing	59	4	1	2	7	4
2017 London	92	2	3	1	6	6
2019 Doha	77	2	3	0	5	6
2022 Eugene	81	1	1	5	7	11
2023 Budapest	51	2	3	5	10	7
2025 Tokyo	64	0	3	2	5	21
2027 Beijing	To be determined					
2029 Nairobi	To be determined					
2031 Munich	To be determined					
Total		33	43	50	126	7

* : ongoing

== Doping disqualification ==
Athlete	Sex	Event	Year(s)	Result	Notes
Dwain Chambers	Men	100 m 4 × 100 m relay	2003	4th	Silver medal-winning British relay team disqualified

== See also ==
- Great Britain at the Olympics
