= Great Britain and Northern Ireland at the 2022 European Athletics Championships =

- Flag of the United Kingdom
- WA code: GBR
- National federation: UK Athletics

in Munich, Germany 15 August 2022 – 21 August 2022
- Competitors: 114 (54 men and 60 women)
- Medals Ranked 2nd: Gold 6 Silver 6 Bronze 8 Total 20

European Athletics Championships appearances
- 1934; 1938; 1946; 1950; 1954; 1958; 1962; 1966; 1969; 1971; 1974; 1978; 1982; 1986; 1990; 1994; 1998; 2002; 2006; 2010; 2012; 2014; 2016; 2018; 2022; 2024; 2026

Great Britain and Northern Ireland competed at the 2022 European Athletics Championships in Munich, Germany, between 15 and 21 August 2022

== Medallists ==
A number of British athletes won multiple medals at the Championships, the most successful of which was Zharnel Hughes with two golds in the men's 200 metres and 4 x 100 metres relay and one silver medal in the 100 metres. Matthew Hudson-Smith also took double gold in the 400 metres and 4 x 400 metres relay. Other athletes to win multiple medals were Dina Asher-Smith, Daryll Neita, Jeremiah Azu, Nethaneel Mitchell-Blake and Alex Haydock-Wilson. Of the returning 2018 champions, Laura Muir, Hudson-Smith and the men's 4 x 100 metre relay team retained their titles. Hughes won the same number and colour of medals in 2022 as in 2018, but swapped his 2018 100 metres gold for the 200 metres gold here.

Medal	Name	Event	Date
Gold	Matthew Hudson-Smith	Men's 400 metres	17 August
Gold	Laura Muir	Women's 1500 metres	19 August
Gold	Zharnel Hughes	Men's 200 metres	19 August
Gold	Keely Hodgkinson	Women's 800 metres	20 August
Gold	Matthew Hudson-Smith; Charlie Dobson; Lewis Davey; Alex Haydock-Wilson; Joe Brier; Rio Mitcham	Men's 4 × 400 metres relay	20 August
Gold	Jeremiah Azu; Zharnel Hughes; Jona Efoloko; Nethaneel Mitchell-Blake; Harry Aikines-Aryeetey; Tommy Ramdhan	Men's 4 × 100 metres relay	21 August
Silver	Eilish McColgan	Women's 10,000 metres	15 August
Silver	Zharnel Hughes	Men's 100 metres	16 August
Silver	Jake Heyward	Men's 1500 metres	18 August
Silver	Nethaneel Mitchell-Blake	Men's 200 metres	19 August
Silver	Dina Asher-Smith	Women's 200 metres	19 August
Silver	Jake Wightman	Men's 800 metres	21 August
Bronze	Jeremiah Azu	Men's 100 metres	16 August
Bronze	Daryll Neita	Women's 100 metres	16 August
Bronze	Alex Haydock-Wilson	Men's 400 metres	17 August
Bronze	Eilish McColgan	Women's 5000 metres	18 August
Bronze	Jazmin Sawyers	Women's long jump	18 August
Bronze	Lawrence Okoye	Men's discus throw	19 August
Bronze	Victoria Ohuruogu; Ama Pipi; Jodie Williams; Nicole Yeargin; Zoey Clark; Laviai Nielsen	Women's 4 × 400 metres relay	20 August
Bronze	Lizzie Bird	Women's 3000 metres steeplechase	20 August

== Results ==
Great Britain entered the following athletes.

Key

- Q = Qualified for the next round
- q = Qualified for the next round as a fastest loser or, in field events, by position without achieving the qualifying target
- NR = National record
- PB = Personal best
- SB = Season best
- N/A = Round not applicable for the event

=== Men ===
Track & road events

Athlete	Event	Heat		Semifinal		Final	
Athlete	Event	Result	Rank	Result	Rank	Result	Rank
Jeremiah Azu	100 m	Bye		10.17	2 Q	10.13	3rd place, bronze medalist(s)
Ojie Edoburun	100 m	Bye		10.25	6	Did not advance	
Zharnel Hughes	100 m	Bye		10.03	1 Q	9.99	2nd place, silver medalist(s)
Reece Prescod	100 m	Bye		10.10	1 Q	10.18	7
Charlie Dobson	200 m	Bye		20.21	1 Q	20.34	4
Zharnel Hughes	200 m	Bye		20.19	1 Q	20.07	1st place, gold medalist(s)
Nethaneel Mitchell-Blake	200 m	Bye		20.34	2 Q	20.17	2nd place, silver medalist(s)
Joe Brier	400 m	46.06	5	Did not advance			
Alex Haydock-Wilson	400 m	Bye		45.45	2 Q	45.17	3rd place, bronze medalist(s)
Matthew Hudson-Smith	400 m	Bye		44.98	1 Q	44.53	1st place, gold medalist(s)
Ben Pattison	800 m	1:47.64	2 Q	1:46.95	4 q	1:45.63	6
Daniel Rowden	800 m	1:47.67	3 Q	1:48.80	5	Did not advance	
Jake Wightman	800 m	1:45.94	1 Q	1:46.61	2 Q	1:44.91	2nd place, silver medalist(s)
Neil Gourley	1500 m	3:38.07	4 Q	—N/a		3:38.40	8
Jake Heyward	1500 m	3:39.30	5 q	—N/a		3:34.44	2nd place, silver medalist(s)
Matthew Stonier	1500 m	3:38.37	5 q	—N/a		3:35.97	5
Sam Atkin	5000 m	—N/a				13:32.35	9
Andrew Butchart	5000 m	—N/a				13:31.47	7
Patrick Dever	5000 m	—N/a				13:45.89	21
Sam Atkin	10000 m	—N/a				DNF	–
Emile Cairess	10000 m	—N/a				28:07.37	11
Marc Scott	10000 m	—N/a				28:07.72	12
David King	110 m hurdles	13.63	2 Q	13.73	5	Did not advance	
Miguel Perera	110 m hurdles	13.72	3 Q	13.58	4	Did not advance	
Andrew Pozzi	110 m hurdles	Bye		13.48	3 q	13.66	6
Seamus Derbyshire	400 m hurdles	50.08	3 Q	49.63	4	Did not advance	
Joshua Faulds	400 m hurdles	51.21	5	Did not advance			
Jacob Paul	400 m hurdles	49.40	2 Q	49.48	5	Did not advance	
Jamaine Coleman	3000 m steeplechase	8:39.22	10	—N/a		Did not advance	
Phil Norman	3000 m steeplechase	8:32.00	3 Q	—N/a		8:33.05	9
Zak Seddon	3000 m steeplechase	8:46.74	11	—N/a		Did not advance	
Jeremiah Azu; Zharnel Hughes; Jona Efoloko; Nethaneel Mitchell-Blake (Ran in heat); Harry Aikines-Aryeetey; Tommy Ramdhan	4 × 100 m relay	38.41	1 Q	—N/a		37.67	1st place, gold medalist(s)
Matthew Hudson-Smith; Charlie Dobson; Lewis Davey; Alex Haydock-Wilson (Ran in heat); Joe Brier; Rio Mitcham (Did not run); Ben Higgins; Kevin Metzger	4 × 400 m relay	3:02.36	3 Q	—N/a		2:59.35	1st place, gold medalist(s)
Callum Wilkinson	20 km walk	—N/a				DQ	–
Mohamud Aadan	Marathon	—N/a				2:17.34	30
Luke Caldwell	Marathon	—N/a				DNF	–
Andrew Davies	Marathon	—N/a				2:18.23	35
Andrew Heyes	Marathon	—N/a				2:19.47	44
Philip Sesemann	Marathon	—N/a				2:15.17	17

Field Events

Athlete	Event	Qualification		Final	
Athlete	Event	Distance	Rank	Distance	Rank
Reynold Banigo	Long jump	7.75	9 q	7.66	10
Jacob Fincham-Dukes	Long jump	7.86	5 q	7.97	5
Jack Roach	Long jump	7.35	18	Did not advance	
Ben Williams	Triple jump	16.47	8 q	16.66	6
Joel Clarke-Khan	High jump	2.21	13 q	NM	–
David Smith	High jump	2.17	18	Did not advance	
Harry Coppell	Pole vault	NM	–	Did not advance	
Scott Lincoln	Shot put	20.64	5 q	19.90	10
Lawrence Okoye	Discus throw	62.56	8 q	67.14	3rd place, bronze medalist(s)
Nick Percy	Discus throw	61.26	14	Did not advance	
Nick Miller	Hammer throw	76.09	9 q	77.29	8

=== Women ===
Track & road events

Athlete	Event	Heat		Semifinal		Final	
Athlete	Event	Result	Rank	Result	Rank	Result	Rank
Dina Asher-Smith	100 m	Bye		11.15	1 Q	16.03	8
Imani-Lara Lansiquot	100 m	Bye		11.23	3 q	11.21	5
Daryll Neita	100 m	Bye		10.95	1 Q	11.00	3rd place, bronze medalist(s)
Ashleigh Nelson	100 m	11.41	3 Q	11.47	6	Did not advance	
Dina Asher-Smith	200 m	Bye		22.53	1 Q	22.43	2nd place, silver medalist(s)
Beth Dobbin	200 m	DQ	-	Did not advance			
Daryll Neita	200 m	Bye		DNS	–	Did not advance	
Jodie Williams	200 m	22.92	1 Q	23.03	2 Q	22.85	4
Laviai Nielsen	400 m	51.60	1 Q	51.53	6	Did not advance	
Victoria Ohuruogu	400 m	Bye		50.50	2 Q	50.51	4
Nicole Yeargin	400 m	Bye		52.09	5	Did not advance	
Alex Bell	800 m	2:02.43	2 Q	2:00.53	3 Q	2:00.68	6
Keely Hodgkinson	800 m	2:03.72	1 Q	2:00.67	1 Q	1:59.04	1st place, gold medalist(s)
Jemma Reekie	800 m	2:02.36	1 Q	2:00.30	2 Q	2:00.31	5
Ellie Baker	1500 m	4:04.90	8 q	—N/a		4:05.83	8
Melissa Courtney-Bryant	1500 m	4:09.11	10	—N/a		Did not advance	
Laura Muir	1500 m	4:06.40	1 Q	—N/a		4:01.08	1st place, gold medalist(s)
Katie Snowden	1500 m	4:03.76	5 q	—N/a		4:04.97	4
Amy-Eloise Markovc	5000 m	—N/a				15:08.75	5
Eilish McColgan	5000 m	—N/a				14:59.34	3rd place, bronze medalist(s)
Calli Thackery	5000 m	—N/a				15:08.79	6
Samantha Harrison	10000 m	—N/a				31:46.87	6
Jessica Judd	10000 m	—N/a				32:23.98	10
Eilish McColgan	10000 m	—N/a				30:41.05	2nd place, silver medalist(s)
Jessica Hunter	100 m hurdles	13.27	1 Q	13.43	8	Did not advance	
Cindy Sember	100 m hurdles	Bye		12.62	1 Q	13.16	8
Jessie Knight	400 m hurdles	Bye		55.39	4	Did not advance	
Hayley McLean	400 m hurdles	56.64	3 Q	56.20	5	Did not advance	
Lina Nielsen	400 m hurdles	Bye		57.19	5	Did not advance	
Lizzie Bird	3000 m steeplechase	9:40.05	3 Q	—N/a		9:23.18	3rd place, bronze medalist(s)
Aimee Pratt	3000 m steeplechase	9:39.22	4 Q	—N/a		9:35.31	7
Elise Thorner	3000 m steeplechase	10:08.46	14	—N/a		Did not advance	
Asha Philip; Imani-Lara Lansiquot; Ashleigh Nelson; Dina Asher-Smith (Ran in heat); Bianca Williams	4 × 100 m relay	42.83	1 Q	—N/a		DNF	–
Victoria Ohuruogu; Ama Pipi; Jodie Williams; Nicole Yeargin (Ran in heat); Zoey Clark; Laviai Nielsen (Did not run); Hannah Williams	4 × 400 m relay	3:23.79	1 Q	—N/a		3:21.74	3rd place, bronze medalist(s)
Heather Lewis	20 km walk	—N/a				1:35.36	13
Bethan Davies	35 km walk	—N/a				2:59.38	11
Becky Briggs	Marathon	—N/a				2:39.02	31
Rosie Edwards	Marathon	—N/a				2:40.47	35
Naomi Mitchell	Marathon	—N/a				2:36.44	25
Alice Wright	Marathon	—N/a				2:35.33	22

Field Events

Athlete	Event	Qualification		Final	
Athlete	Event	Distance	Rank	Distance	Rank
Abigail Irozuru	Long jump	6.15	20	Did not advance	
Jazmin Sawyers	Long jump	6.60	6 q	6.80	3rd place, bronze medalist(s)
Jahisha Thomas	Long jump	6.57	10 q	6.37	10
Naomi Metzger	Triple jump	14.24	4 q	14.33	6
Morgan Lake	High jump	1.87	9 q	1.90	7
Laura Zialor	High jump	NM	–	Did not advance	
Molly Caudery	Pole vault	4.50	8 q	4.55	7
Sophie Cook	Pole vault	4.50	9 q	4.40	9
Sophie McKinna	Shot put	17.33	12 q	16.29	12
Divine Oladipo	Shot put	17.16	16	Did not advance	
Amelia Strickler	Shot put	17.20	15	Did not advance	
Jade Lally	Discus throw	57.68	11 q	57.08	9
Kirsty Law	Discus throw	54.83	21	Did not advance	
Jessica Mayho	Hammer throw	63.90	22	Did not advance	
Charlotte Payne	Hammer throw	NM	–	Did not advance	
Anna Purchase	Hammer throw	NM	–	Did not advance	
Bekah Walton	Javelin throw	54.20	19	Did not advance	

Combined events – Heptathlon

Athlete	Event	100H	HJ	SP	200 m	LJ	JT	800 m	Final	Rank
Holly Mills	Result	13.74	1.74	13.23	25.11	5.72	DNS	–	DNF	
Holly Mills	Points	1015	903	743	877	765	–	–	DNF	
Jade O'Dowda	Result	13.72	1.80	12.98	24.80	6.27	41.21	2:12.03	6187	7
Jade O'Dowda	Points	1018	978	726	905	934	691.	935	6187	7

Key

- Q = Qualified for the next round
- q = Qualified for the next round as a fastest loser or, in field events, by position without achieving the qualifying target
- N/A = Round not applicable for the event
- Bye = Athlete not required to compete in round
