= Great Britain and Northern Ireland at the 2023 World Athletics Championships =

- Flag of Great Britain
- WA code: GBR

in Budapest, Hungary 19 August 2023 – 27 August 2023
- Competitors: 55 (21 men and 34 women)
- Medals Ranked 7th: Gold 2 Silver 3 Bronze 5 Total 10

World Athletics Championships appearances (overview)
- 1976; 1980; 1983; 1987; 1991; 1993; 1995; 1997; 1999; 2001; 2003; 2005; 2007; 2009; 2011; 2013; 2015; 2017; 2019; 2022; 2023; 2025

Great Britain and Northern Ireland competed at the 2023 World Athletics Championships in Budapest, Hungary, from 19 to 27 August 2023.

== Medallists ==
Medal	Name	Event	Date
Gold	Katarina Johnson-Thompson	Women's heptathlon	20 August
Gold	Josh Kerr	Men's 1500 metres	23 August
Silver	Joe Brier*; Lewis Davey; Rio Mitcham; Laviai Nielsen; Yemi Mary John	Mixed 4 × 400 metres relay	19 August
Silver	Matthew Hudson-Smith	Men's 400 metres	24 August
Silver	Keely Hodgkinson	Women's 800 metres	27 August
Bronze	Zharnel Hughes	Men's 100 metres	20 August
Bronze	Ben Pattison	Men's 800 metres	26 August
Bronze	Imani-Lara Lansiquot; Daryll Neita; Asha Philip; Annie Tagoe*; Bianca Williams	Women's 4 × 100 metres relay	26 August
Bronze	Lewis Davey; Charlie Dobson; Alex Haydock-Wilson; Rio Mitcham	Men's 4 × 400 metres relay	27 August
Bronze	Amber Anning; Yemi Mary John*; Laviai Nielsen; Nicole Yeargin; Ama Pipi	Women's 4 × 400 metres relay	27 August

* – Indicates the athlete competed in preliminaries but not the final

== Results ==
Great Britain and Northern Ireland entered 55 athletes.

Key

- Q = Qualified for the next round
- q = Qualified for the next round as a fastest loser or, in field events, by position without achieving the qualifying target
- AR = Area record
- NR = National record
- PB = Personal best
- SB = Season best
- N/A = Round not applicable for the event

=== Men ===
Track and road events

Athlete	Event	Heat		Semifinal		Final	
Athlete	Event	Result	Rank	Result	Rank	Result	Rank
Eugene Amo-Dadzie	100 metres	10.10	2 Q	10.03	4	Did not advance	
Zharnel Hughes	100 metres	10.00	1 Q	9.93	2 Q	9.88	(bronze)
Reece Prescod	100 metres	10.14	3 Q	10.26	8	Did not advance	
Zharnel Hughes	200 metres	19.99	1 Q	20.02	2 Q	20.02	4
Matthew Hudson-Smith	400 metres	44.69 SB	2 Q	44.26 AR	1 Q	44.31	2nd place, silver medalist(s)
Max Burgin	800 metres	1:45.43	2 Q	1:47.60	8	Did not advance	
Ben Pattison	800 metres	1:46.57	2 Q	1:44.23	3 q	1:44.83	3rd place, bronze medalist(s)
Daniel Rowden	800 metres	1:45.67	3 Q	1:45.38	7	Did not advance	
Elliot Giles	1500 metres	3:34.63	5 Q	3:39.05	12	Did not advance	
Neil Gourley	1500 metres	3:46.87	3 Q	3:32.97	6 Q	3:31.10	9
Josh Kerr	1500 metres	3:34.00	2 Q	3:35.14	2 Q	3:29.38 SB	1st place, gold medalist(s)
Tade Ojora	110 metres hurdles	13.32	1 Q	13.43	5	Did not advance	
Eugene Amo-Dadzie; Jeremiah Azu; Jona Efoloko*; Adam Gemili; Zharnel Hughes	4 × 100 metres relay	38.01	3 Q	—N/a		37.80 SB	4
Lewis Davey; Charlie Dobson; Alex Haydock-Wilson; Rio Mitcham	4 × 400 metres relay	2:59.42 SB	3 Q	—N/a		2:58.71 SB	3rd place, bronze medalist(s)

Field events

Athlete	Event	Qualification		Final	
Athlete	Event	Distance	Position	Distance	Position
Scott Lincoln	Shot put	20.22	18	Did not advance	
Lawrence Okoye	Discus throw	63.66	13	Did not advance	

=== Women ===
Track and road events

Athlete	Event	Heat		Semifinal		Final	
Athlete	Event	Result	Rank	Result	Rank	Result	Rank
Dina Asher-Smith	100 metres	11.04	2 Q	11.01	3 q	11.00	8
Imani-Lara Lansiquot	100 metres	DQ		Did not advance			
Daryll Neita	100 metres	11.03	2 Q	11.03	4	Did not advance	
Dina Asher-Smith	200 metres	22.46	1 Q	22.28	2 Q	22.34	7
Daryll Neita	200 metres	22.39	2 Q	22.21 PB	2 Q	22.16 PB	5
Bianca Williams	200 metres	22.67	3 Q	22.45 PB	4	Did not advance	
Victoria Ohuruogu	400 metres	50.60	2 Q	50.74	4	Did not advance	
Ama Pipi	400 metres	50.81	2 Q	51.17	4	Did not advance	
Isabelle Boffey	800 metres	2:01.40	6	Did not advance			
Keely Hodgkinson	800 metres	1:59.53	1 Q	1:58.48	1 Q	1:56.34	2nd place, silver medalist(s)
Jemma Reekie	800 metres	1:59.71	2 Q	2:00.28	1 Q	1:57.72	5
Melissa Courtney-Bryant	1500 metres	4:03.14	5 Q	4:02.79	5 Q	4:03.31	12
Laura Muir	1500 metres	4:03.50	2 Q	3:56.36 SB	4 Q	3:58.58	6
Katie Snowden	1500 metres	4:01.15	4 Q	3:56.72 PB	5 Q	3:59.65	8
Megan Keith	5000 metres	15:21.94	14	—N/a		Did not advance	
Amy-Eloise Markovc	5000 metres	15:13.66 SB	11	—N/a		Did not advance	
Eilish McColgan	10,000 metres	—N/a					
Jessica Warner-Judd	10,000 metres	—N/a				31:35.38	8
Natasha Cockram	Marathon	—N/a				2:35:34 SB	30
Cindy Sember	100 metres hurdles	12.83 SB	4 Q	12.97	6	Did not advance	
Jessie Knight	400 metres hurdles	54.27	1 Q	54.51	4	Did not advance	
Aimee Pratt	3000 metres steeplechase	9:26.37	7	—N/a		Did not advance	
Imani-Lara Lansiquot; Daryll Neita; Asha Philip; Annie Tagoe*; Bianca Williams	4 × 100 metres relay	42.33 SB	2 Q	—N/a		41.97 SB	3rd place, bronze medalist(s)
Amber Anning; Yemi Mary John*; Laviai Nielsen; Ama Pipi; Nicole Yeargin	4 × 400 metres relay	3:23.33 SB	1 Q	—N/a		3:21.04 SB	3rd place, bronze medalist(s)

Field events

Athlete	Event	Qualification		Final	
Athlete	Event	Distance	Position	Distance	Position
Morgan Lake	High jump	1.92	4 q	1.97	4
Holly Bradshaw	Pole vault	4.35	29	Did not advance	
Molly Caudery	Pole vault	4.65	12 Q	4.75 PB	=5
Jazmin Sawyers	Long jump	6.41	22	Did not advance	
Charlotte Payne	Hammer throw	69.57	20	Did not advance	
Anna Purchase	Hammer throw	71.31	11 q	70.29	11

Combined events – Heptathlon

Athlete	Event	100H	HJ	SP	200 m	LJ	JT	800 m	Final	Rank
Katarina Johnson-Thompson	Result	13.50	1.86	13.64	23.48	6.54	46.14 PB	2:05.63 PB	6740 SB	1st place, gold medalist(s)
Katarina Johnson-Thompson	Points	1050	1054	770	1031	1020	785	1030	6740 SB	1st place, gold medalist(s)

=== Mixed ===
Track events

Athlete	Event	Heat		Final	
Athlete	Event	Result	Rank	Result	Rank
Joe Brier*; Lewis Davey; Yemi Mary John; Rio Mitcham; Laviai Nielsen	4 × 400 metres relay	3:11:19 NR	2 Q	3:11.06 NR	2nd place, silver medalist(s)
