= 2023 World Athletics Championships – Mixed 4 × 400 metres relay =

Mixed 4 × 400 metres relay at the 2023 World Athletics Championships
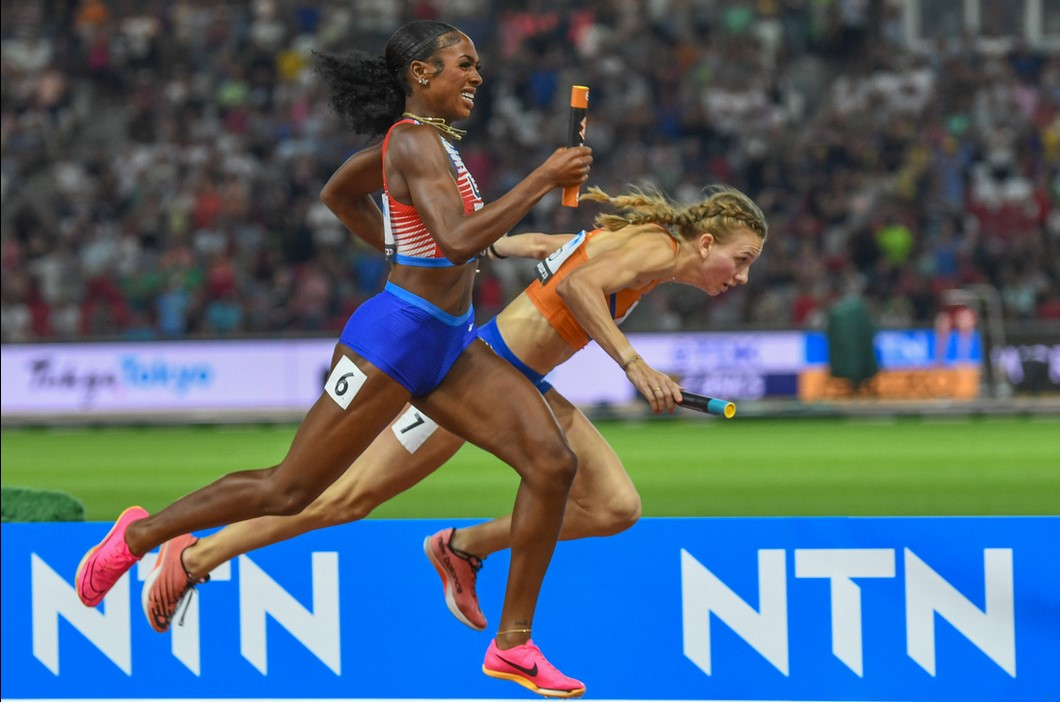
- Alexis Holmes and Femke Bol (while falling) shortly before the finish line in the final
- Venue: National Athletics Centre
- Location: Budapest, Hungary
- Dates: 19 August 2023 (round 1 and final)
- Nations: 16
- Winning time: 3:08.80 min WR

Medalists
gold medal	Justin Robinson; Rosey Effiong; Matthew Boling; Alexis Holmes; Ryan Willie	United States
silver medal	Lewis Davey; Laviai Nielsen; Rio Mitcham; Yemi Mary John; Joseph Brier	Great Britain and Northern Ireland
bronze medal	Matěj Krsek; Tereza Petržilková; Patrik Šorm; Lada Vondrová	Czech Republic

The mixed 4 × 400 metres relay at the 2023 World Athletics Championships was held over two rounds at the National Athletics Centre in Budapest, Hungary, on 19 August 2023. It was the third time that this mixed-sex event was contested at the World Athletics Championships. Teams could qualify through their position at the 2022 World Athletics Championships or the World Athletics top list.

Sixteen teams competed in round 1, where the teams of Great Britain and Northern Ireland, France, and Hungary broke national records. Eight teams advanced to the final, that was won by the team of the United States in a world record of 3:08.80 minutes, followed by the team of Great Britain and Northern Ireland in second place in a national record of 3:11.06 min and the team of Czech Republic in third place in a national record of 3:11.98 min. The Netherlands did not finish in the final, after their anchor runner Femke Bol had fallen five metres before the line.

== Background ==
In the mixed 4 × 400 metres relay, a team consists of four competing athletes, two men and two women. An athletes runs one round on a 400-metre track and passes on a baton to the next team member. The mandatory running order is man-woman-man-woman.

This mixed-sex event was introduced at the 2019 World Athletics Championships and had been contested two times before. The 2023 World Athletics Championships were held at the National Athletics Centre in Budapest, Hungary.

Before these world championships, the world record and championship record was 3:09.34 min set by the team of the United States at the 2019 World Athletics Championships on 29 September 2019. The world leading performance was 3:12.34 min, run by the team of the Czech Republic in Chorzów, Poland, on 25 June 2023. The defending champion was the team of the Dominican Republic.

Global records before the 2023 World Athletics Championships
Record	Nation (athletes)	Time	Location	Date
World record	United States (Wilbert London, Allyson Felix, Courtney Okolo, Michael Cherry)	3:09.34	Doha, Qatar	29 September 2019
Championship record	United States (Wilbert London, Allyson Felix, Courtney Okolo, Michael Cherry)	3:09.34	Doha, Qatar	29 September 2019
World leading	Czech Republic (Matěj Krsek, Tereza Petržilková, Vít Müller, Lada Vondrová)	3:12.34	Chorzów, Poland	25 June 2023

Area records before the 2023 World Athletics Championships
Record	Nation (athletes)	Time	Location	Date
African record	Nigeria (Ifeanyi Ojeli, Imaobong Uko, Samson Nathaniel, Patience Okon George)	3:13.60	Tokyo, Japan	30 July 2021
Asian record	Bahrain (Musa Isah, Aminat Jamal, Salwa Eid Naser, Abbas Abubakar Abbas)	3:11.82	Doha, Qatar	29 September 2019
European record	Poland (Karol Zalewski, Natalia Kaczmarek, Justyna Święty-Ersetic, Kajetan Duszyński)	3:09.87	Tokyo, Japan	31 July 2021
North, Central American and Caribbean record	United States (Wilbert London, Allyson Felix, Courtney Okolo, Michael Cherry)	3:09.34	Doha, Qatar	29 September 2019
South American record	Colombia (Jhon Perlaza, Lina Licona, Anthony Zambrano, Evelis Aguilar)	3:14.79	São Paulo, Brazil	28 July 2023
Oceanian record	Australia (Bendere Oboya, Anneliese Rubie-Renshaw, Tyler Gunn, Alex Beck)	3:17.00	Gold Coast, Australia	12 June 2021

== Qualification ==
Sixteen teams could qualify for this event. The top eight teams from the mixed 4 × 400 metres relay of the 2022 World Athletics Championships would qualify automatically. These teams were the Dominican Republic, the Netherlands, the United States, Poland, Jamaica, Nigeria, Italy, and Ireland. The other eight teams would be the next eight best teams from the World Athletics top list based on results from the qualification period from 31 July 2022 until 20 July 2023.

== Results ==
=== Round 1 ===
The two heats of round 1 were held on 19 August, started at 11:05 (UTC+2) in the morning. The first three teams in each heat (Q) and the next two fastest teams overall (q) qualified for the final. In the first heat, the team of the Dominican Republic did not start, the team of Great Britain and Northern Ireland set a national record (NR) of 3:11.19 min. and the team of Hungary set a national record of 3:14.08 min. In the secon heat, the team of France set a national record of 3:12.25 min, and the team of Poland finished last but advanced to the final after a referee decision.

Results of round 1
Rank	Heat	Nation	Athletes	Time	Notes
1	1	United States	Ryan Willie, Rosey Effiong, Justin Robinson, Alexis Holmes	3:10.41	Q, WL
2	1	Great Britain & N.I.	Joseph Brier, Laviai Nielsen, Rio Mitcham, Yemi Mary John	3:11.19	Q, NR
3	1	Belgium	Robin Vanderbemden, Imke Vervaet, Florent Mabille, Camille Laus	3:11.81	Q, SB
4	2	Netherlands	Isaya Klein Ikkink, Lieke Klaver, Terrence Agard, Femke Bol	3:12.12	Q, SB
5	2	France	Gilles Biron, Louise Maraval, Téo Andant, Amandine Brossier	3:12.25	Q, NR
6	2	Czech Republic	Matěj Krsek, Tereza Petržilková, Patrik Šorm, Lada Vondrová	3:12.52	Q
7	2	Germany	Manuel Sanders, Alica Schmidt, Jean Paul Bredau, Skadi Schier	3:13.25	q, SB
8	1	Ireland	Jack Raftery, Sophie Becker, Christopher O'Donnell, Sharlene Mawdsley	3:13.90	q, SB
9	2	Jamaica	Demish Gaye, Natoya Goule-Toppin, Malik James-King, Stacey Ann Williams	3:14.05	SB
10	1	Hungary	Attila Molnár, Bianka Kéri, Zoltán Wahl, Janka Molnár	3:14.08	NR
11	2	Switzerland	Lionel Spitz, Giula Senn, Ricky Petrucciani, Julia Niederberger	3:14.38	
12	2	Nigeria	Dubem Nwachukwu, Patience Okon George, Ezekiel Nathaniel, Imaobong Nse Uko	3:14.38	SB
13	1	Italy	Lorenzo Benati, Ayomide Folorunso, Riccardo Meli, Alice Mangione	3:14.56	
14	2	Poland	Karol Zalewski, Marika Popowicz-Drapała, Kajetan Duszyński, Patrycja Wyciszkiewicz-Zawadzka	3:14.63	qR
15	1	Kenya	Zablon Ekhal Ekwam, Milicent Ndoro, Wyclife Kinyamal, Mercy Oketch	3:15.47	
16	1	Portugal	Omar Elkhatib, Cátia Azevedo, Ricardo dos Santos, Fatoumata Binta Diallo	3:15.75	
	1	Dominican Republic		DNS	

=== Final ===
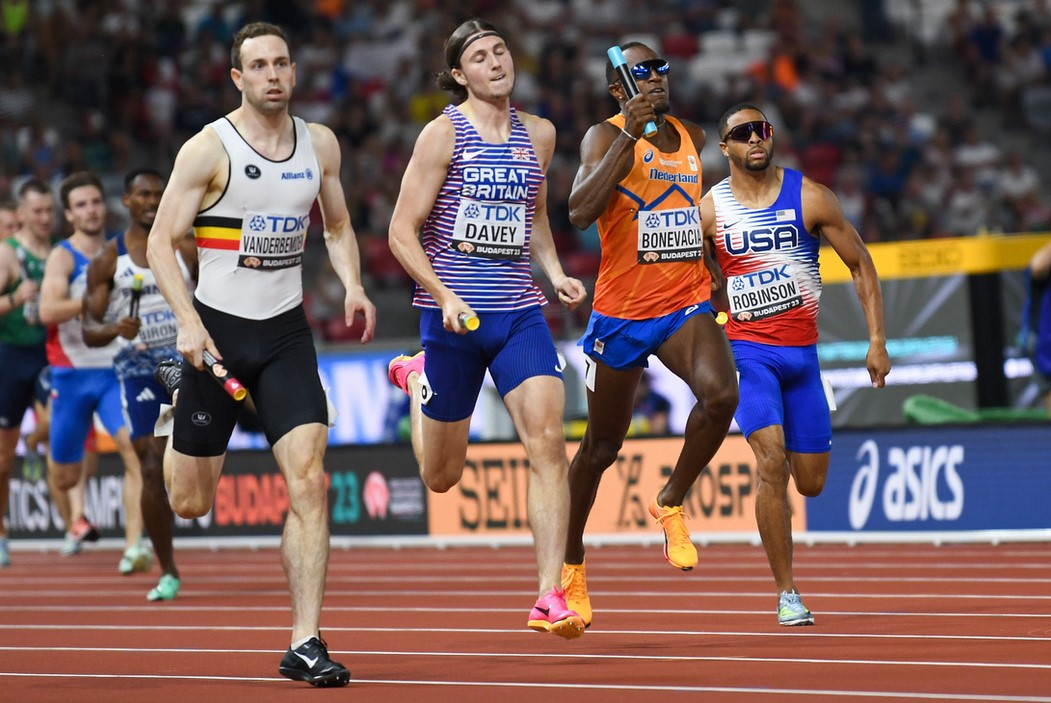
First-leg runners in the final

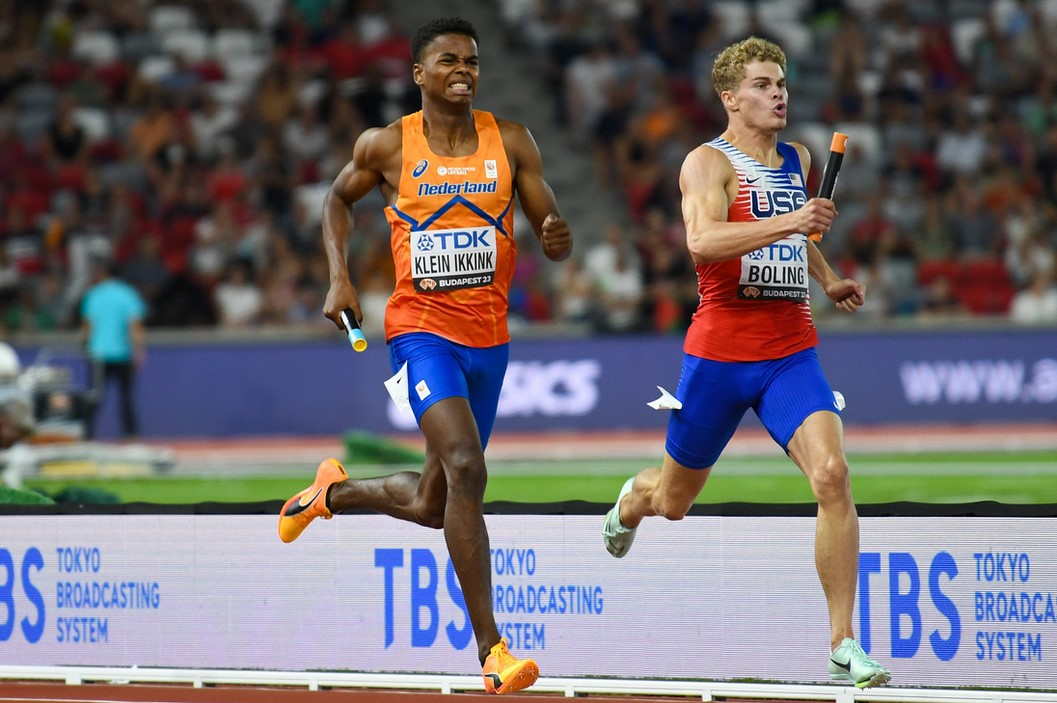
Third-leg runners in the final

Nine teams competed in the final on 19 August in the evening, starting at 21:49 (UTC+2). In the first leg, Justin Robinson of the United States was the first to hand over the baton, followed by Liemarvin Bonevacia of the Netherlands, and Lewis Davey of Great Britain and Northern Ireland. In the second leg, Lieke Klaver of the Netherlands was in the lead position at the second handover, followed by Rosey Effiong of the United States, and Laviai Nielsen of Great Britain and Northern Ireland. In the third leg, Isaya Klein Ikkink of the Netherlands was first to hand over the baton, followed by Matthew Boling of the United States, and Rio Mitcham of Great Britain and Northern Ireland. In the anchor leg, Femke Bol of the Netherlands was in first position, but fell five metres before the finish line, dropping her baton. As a result the team of the Netherlands did not finish (DNF), and Bol was passed by Alexis Holmes of the United States, Yemi Mary John of Great Britain and Northern Ireland, and Lada Vondrová of the Czech Republic.

The team of the United States won the race in a new world record (WR) of 3:08.80 min, the team of Great Britain and Northern Ireland finished in second place in a national record (NR) of 3:11.06 min and the team of the Czech Republic finished in third place in a national record of 3:11.98 min. The fastest split time of a male runner was 44.05 s by Téo Andant of France and the fastest split time of a female was 48.82 s by Holmes.

After the race, Bol said in the interview: "I don't know what happened, I cramped towards the finish line, I was pushing, pushing, pushing. I was disappointed that my body did not have it in to finish the race strongly. I'm sorry for my team, I should have finished it off and it sucks big time." Holmes said: "It is amazing. It was definitely tough to run against Femke Bol. She is an amazing athlete but I believed I could run it down because I felt really strong and determined to win and I felt good."

Results of the final
Rank	Lane	Nation	Athletes	Time	Notes
1st place, gold medalist(s)	6	United States	Justin Robinson, Rosey Effiong, Matthew Boling, Alexis Holmes	3:08.80	WR
2nd place, silver medalist(s)	8	Great Britain & N.I.	Lewis Davey, Laviai Nielsen, Rio Mitcham, Yemi Mary John	3:11.06	NR
3rd place, bronze medalist(s)	4	Czech Republic	Matěj Krsek, Tereza Petržilková, Patrik Šorm, Lada Vondrová	3:11.98	NR
4	5	France	Gilles Biron, Louise Maraval, Téo Andant, Amandine Brossier	3:12.99	
5	9	Belgium	Robin Vanderbemden, Imke Vervaet, Jonathan Borlée, Camille Laus	3:13.83	
6	3	Ireland	Jack Raftery, Sophie Becker, Christopher O'Donnell, Sharlene Mawdsley	3:14.13	
7	2	Germany	Manuel Sanders, Alica Schmidt, Jean Paul Bredau, Elisa Lechleitner	3:14.27	
8	1	Poland	Igor Bogaczyński, Patrycja Wyciszkiewicz-Zawadzka, Karol Zalewski, Marika Popowicz-Drapała	3:15.49	
	7	Netherlands	Liemarvin Bonevacia, Lieke Klaver, Isaya Klein Ikkink, Femke Bol	DNF	
