= 2023 World Athletics Championships – Men's 4 × 400 metres relay =

Men's 4 × 400 metres relay at the 2023 World Championships
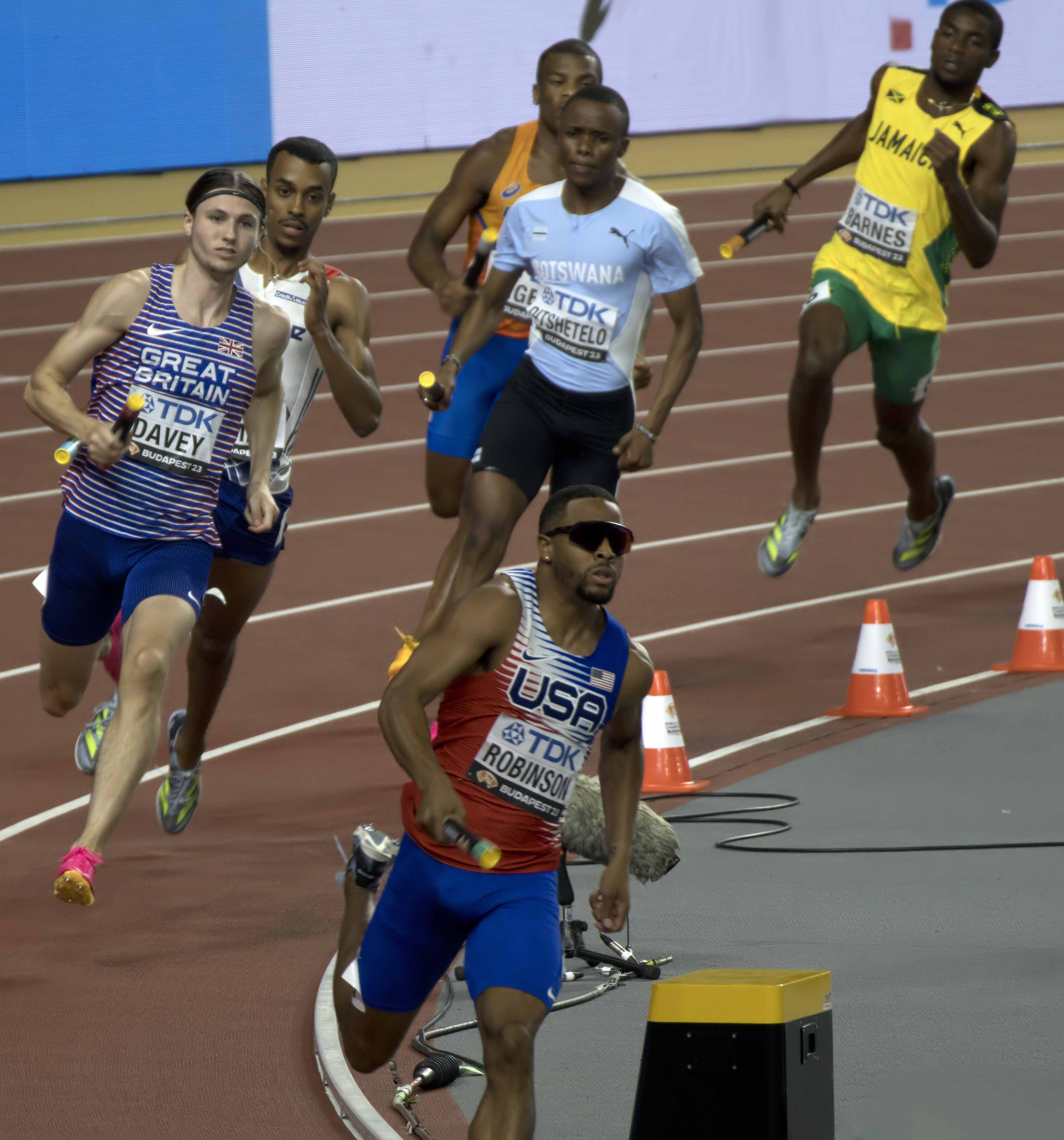
- The final underway.
- Venue: National Athletics Centre
- Dates: 26 August (heats); 27 August (final)
- Nations: 17
- Winning time: 2:57.31

Medalists
gold medal	Quincy Hall; Vernon Norwood; Justin Robinson; Rai Benjamin	United States
silver medal	Ludvy Vaillant; Gilles Biron; David Sombé; Téo Andant	France
bronze medal	Alex Haydock-Wilson; Charlie Dobson; Lewis Davey; Rio Mitcham	Great Britain

The men's 4 × 400 metres relay at the 2023 World Athletics Championships was held at the National Athletics Centre in Budapest on 26 and 27 August 2023.

== Summary ==
The preliminary round was highly competitive. In the first heat USA was able to hold off a hard charging team from India setting the Asian Record. The top 4 from that heat were the top 4 qualifiers.

In the final, USA's bronze medalist Quincy Hall was out fast, making up the 3 turn stagger distance on GBR's Alex Haydock-Wilson. Inside of Hall, France Ludvy Vaillant, Jamaica Rusheen McDonald and India Muhammed Anas were all running well. USA exchanged first to Vernon Norwood. Jamaica was next, but Roshawn Clarke did shuffle step that delayed his start, evening the chase group and letting Norwood have a bigger advantage. After the break, Gilles Biron brought France into second place, closing down to 5 metres by the head of the straightaway. From there, Norwood opened up another 3 metres before handing off to Justin Robinson. France was able to make a clean handoff to David Sombé and GBR's Charlie Dobson was able to pass to Lewis Davey unobstructed, but Botswana's veteran Baboloki Thebe came into the passing zone inside of Jamaica, while Laone Ditshetelo was waiting outside of Jamaica. Thebe cut through the middle of Jamaica's handoff from Clarke to Zandrion Barnes, then after handing off awkwardly, Thebe tripped making India's Muhammed Ajmal Variyathodi have to jump to hurdle Thebe. Botswana would get disqualified for interference after the race, but Jamaica and India were disadvantaged and Botswana was still on the track. GBR got ahead of France down the backstretch, with Botswana ahead of Jamaica. Sombé went round the outside to pass Dobson, Ditshetelo then passed on the inside. By gain being on the inside, Ditshetelo had to slow to pass behind GBR, but he still had to cut across two lanes to hand off. USA handed off clean to Rai Benjamin still 8 metres ahead of the field. France's Téo Andant got out with a 3-metre advantage on GBR's Rio Mitcham. Jamaica's Antonio Watson was another 3 metres down to GBR, with Botswana's Leungo Scotch nagging him on the inside. Down the backstretch, Watson made up those 3 metres, pulling even with Mitcham, but Mitcham held him to the outside entering the final turn. Watson dropped back for one more run at it coming off the turn, but instead Mitcham came off the turn sprinting after Andant. Up front Benjamin finished 10 metres up on France while GBR closed to 2 metres behind at the finish.

== Records ==
Before the competition, records were as follows:

Record	Athlete & Nat.	Perf.	Location	Date
World record	United States; Andrew Valmon, Quincy Watts, Butch Reynolds, Michael Johnson	2:54.29	Stuttgart, Germany	22 August 1993
Championship record	United States; Andrew Valmon, Quincy Watts, Butch Reynolds, Michael Johnson	2:54.29	Stuttgart, Germany	22 August 1993
World Leading	Florida; Emmanuel Bamidele, Jacory Patterson, Jevaughn Powell, Ryan Willie	2:57.74	Austin, United States	9 Jun 2023
African Record	Botswana; Isaac Makwala, Baboloki Thebe, Zibane Ngozi, Bayapo Ndori	2:57.27	Tokyo, Japan	7 August 2021
Asian Record	Japan; Fuga Sato, Kaito Kawabata, Julian Jrummi Walsh, Yuki Joseph Nakajima	2:59.51	Eugene, United States	24 July 2022
North, Central American and Caribbean record	United States; Andrew Valmon, Quincy Watts, Butch Reynolds, Michael Johnson	2:54.29	Stuttgart, Germany	22 August 1993
South American Record	Brazil; Eronilde de Araújo, Sanderlei Parrela, Anderson Oliveira, Claudinei da Silva	2:58.56	Winnipeg, Canada	30 July 1999
European Record	Great Britain; Jamie Baulch, Iwan Thomas, Mark Richardson, Roger Black	2:56.60	Atlanta, United States	3 August 1996
Oceanian record	Australia; Bruce Frayne, Darren Clark, Gary Minihan, Rick Mitchell	2:59.70	Los Angeles, United States	11 August 1984

== Qualification standard ==
The original standard to qualify automatically for entry was to finish in the first 12 at the 2023 World Athletics Relays, completed by 4 top lists' teams; with the postponement of the World Relays event due to ongoing pandemic conditions in the host city of Guangzhou, this was changed to the top eight teams from the 2022 World Athletics Championship, plus the next eight best international teams, based on performances in official competitions between 31 July 2022 and 20 July 2023.

The top 8 teams from the 2022 World Athletics Championships:

- United States (1st)
- Jamaica (2nd)
- Belgium (3rd)
- Japan (4th)
- Trinidad and Tobago (5th)
- Botswana (6th)
- France (7th)
- Czech Republic (8th)

Top list before the 30 July 2023

- 2:59.35 Great Britain & N.I. Olympiastadion, München (GER) - 20 August 2022
- 3:00.54 Spain Olympiastadion, München (GER) - 20 August 2022
- 3:01.34 Netherlands Olympiastadion, München (GER) - 20 August 2022
- 3:01.56 Sri Lanka Supachalasai National Stadiuma, Bangkok (THA) - 16 July 2023
- 3:01.62 Italy Stade Municipal, Annecy FRA) - 11 June 2023
- 3:01.80 Germany Olympiastadion, München (GER) - 19 August 2022
- 3:01.80 India Supachalasai National Stadiuma, Bangkok (THA) - 16 July 2023
- 3:02.02 Kenya Nyayo National Stadium, Nairobi (KEN) - 24 June 2023

== Schedule ==
The event schedule, in local time (UTC+2), is as follows:

Date	Time	Round
26 August	19:30	Heats
27 August	21:37	Final

== Results ==
=== Heats ===
The first three in each heat (Q) and the next two fastest (q) qualified for the final. The overall results were as follows:

Rank	Heat	Lane	Nation	Athletes	Time	Notes
1	1	9	United States	Trevor Bassitt, Matthew Boling, Christopher Bailey, Justin Robinson	2:58.47	Q
2	1	4	India	Muhammed Anas, Amoj Jacob, Muhammed Ajmal Variyathodi, Rajesh Ramesh	2:59.05	Q AR
3	1	3	Great Britain & N.I.	Lewis Davey, Charlie Dobson, Rio Mitcham, Alex Haydock-Wilson	2:59.42 [.412]	Q SB
4	1	1	Botswana	Zibane Ngozi, Baboloki Thebe, Laone Ditshetelo, Leungo Scotch	2:59.42 [.420]	q SB
5	2	3	Jamaica	Rusheen McDonald, Jevaughn Powell, Zandrion Barnes, D'Andre Anderson	2:59.82	Q SB
6	2	6	France	Ludvy Vaillant, Loïc Prévot, David Sombé, Téo Andant	3:00.05	Q SB
7	2	5	Italy	Davide Re, Edoardo Scotti, Lorenzo Benati, Alessandro Sibilio	3:00.14	Q SB
8	2	2	Netherlands	Liemarvin Bonevacia, Terrence Agard, Ramsey Angela, Isaya Klein Ikkink	3:00.23	q SB
9	2	4	Belgium	Julien Watrin, Dylan Borlée, Robin Vanderbemden, Alexander Doom	3:00.33	SB
10	1	2	Japan	Naohiro Jinushi, Fuga Sato, Kentaro Sato, Yuki Joseph Nakajima	3:00.39	SB
11	2	9	Germany	Jean Paul Bredau, Marvin Schlegel, Marc Koch, Manuel Sanders	3:00.67	SB
12	1	6	Czech Republic	Matěj Krsek, Pavel Maslák, Vít Müller, Patrik Šorm	3:00.99	NR
13	2	8	Kenya	Kennedy Kimeu Muthoki, Zablon Ekhal Ekwam, Kelvin Sane Tauta, Wyclife Kinyamal	3:01.41	SB
14	1	8	Trinidad and Tobago	Renny Quow, Asa Guevara, Shakeem McKay, Jereem Richards	3:01.54	SB
15	1	5	Spain	Iñaki Cañal, Samuel García, Bernat Erta, Óscar Husillos	3:02.64	SB
16	1	7	Hungary	Ernő Steigerwald, Zoltán Wahl, Árpád Kovács, Attila Molnár	3:02.65	NR
17	2	7	Sri Lanka	Aruna Darshana, Rajitha Nernajan Rajakaruna, Pabasara Niku, Kalinga Kumarage	3:03.25	

=== Final ===
Rank	Lane	Nation	Athletes	Time	Notes
1st place, gold medalist(s)	8	United States	Quincy Hall, Vernon Norwood, Justin Robinson, Rai Benjamin	2:57.31	WL
2nd place, silver medalist(s)	7	France	Ludvy Vaillant, Gilles Biron, David Sombé, Téo Andant	2:58.45	NR
3rd place, bronze medalist(s)	9	Great Britain & N.I.	Alex Haydock-Wilson, Charlie Dobson, Lewis Davey, Rio Mitcham	2:58.71	SB
4	6	Jamaica	Rusheen McDonald, Roshawn Clarke, Zandrion Barnes, Antonio Watson	2:59.34	SB
5	5	India	Muhammed Anas, Amoj Jacob, Muhammed Ajmal Variyathodi, Rajesh Ramesh	2:59.92	
6	3	Netherlands	Isayah Boers, Terrence Agard, Ramsey Angela, Isaya Klein Ikkink	3:00.40	
7	4	Italy	Edoardo Scotti, Riccardo Meli, Lorenzo Benati, Davide Re	3:01.23	
	2	Botswana	Zibane Ngozi, Baboloki Thebe, Laone Ditshetelo, Leungo Scotch	DQ	
