= 2022 European Athletics Championships – Men's 4 × 400 metres relay =

Men's 4 × 400 metres relay at the 2022 European Athletics Championships
- Venue: Olympiastadion
- Location: Munich
- Dates: 19 August (heats); 20 August (final)
- Competitors: 72 from 16 nations
- Winning time: 2:59.35

Medalists
| gold medal | Matthew Hudson-Smith; Charlie Dobson; Lewis Davey; Alex Haydock-Wilson; Joseph Brier*; Rio Mitcham* | Great Britain |
| silver medal | Alexander Doom; Julien Watrin; Kévin Borlée; Dylan Borlée; Jonathan Borlée*; Jonathan Sacoor* | Belgium |
| bronze medal | Gilles Biron; Loïc Prévot; Téo Andant; Thomas Jordier; Simon Boypa* | France |

The men's 4 × 400 metres relay at the 2022 European Athletics Championships took place at the Olympiastadion on 19 and 20 August.

== Records ==
Standing records prior to the 2022 European Athletics Championships
| World record | United States; Andrew Valmon, Quincy Watts; Butch Reynolds, Michael Johnson | 2:54.29 | Stuttgart, Germany | 22 August 1993 |
| European record | Great Britain; Iwan Thomas, Jamie Baulch; Mark Richardson, Roger Black | 2:56.60 | Atlanta, United States | 3 August 1996 |
| Championship record | Great Britain; Paul Sanders, Kriss Akabusi; John Regis, Roger Black | 2:58.22 | Split, Yugoslavia | 1 September 1990 |
| World Leading | United States; Elija Godwin, Michael Norman; Bryce Deadmon, Champion Allison | 2:56.17 | Eugene, United States | 24 July 2022 |
| European Leading | Belgium; Dylan Borlée, Julien Watrin; Alexander Doom, Kévin Borlée | 2:58.72 | Eugene, United States | 24 July 2022 |

== Schedule ==
| Date | Time | Round |
|---|---|---|
| 19 August 2022 | 11:10 | Round 1 |
| 20 August 2022 | 21:15 | Final |

== Results ==
=== Round 1 ===
First 3 in each heat (Q) and 2 best performers (q) advance to the Final.

| Rank | Heat | Lane | Nation | Athletes | Time | Notes |
|---|---|---|---|---|---|---|
| 1 | 1 | 4 | Spain | Samuel García, Lucas Búa, Óscar Husillos, Manuel Guijarro | 3:01.27 | Q, SB |
| 2 | 1 | 6 | Netherlands | Isayah Boers, Liemarvin Bonevacia, Jochem Dobber, Ramsey Angela | 3:01.57 | Q, SB |
| 3 | 1 | 5 | Germany | Marvin Schlegel, Patrick Schneider, Marc Koch, Manuel Sanders | 3:01.80 | Q, SB |
| 4 | 1 | 2 | Belgium | Alexander Doom, Jonathan Borlée, Jonathan Sacoor, Dylan Borlée | 3:01.80 | q |
| 5 | 2 | 4 | Czech Republic | Matěj Krsek, Pavel Maslák, Michal Desenský, Patrik Šorm | 3:02.07 | Q |
| 6 | 2 | 6 | France | Gilles Biron, Loïc Prévot, Simon Boypa, Téo Andant | 3:02.09 | Q |
| 7 | 2 | 1 | Great Britain | Joseph Brier, Rio Mitcham, Lewis Davey, Alex Haydock-Wilson | 3:02.36 | Q, SB |
| 8 | 2 | 8 | Italy | Lorenzo Benati, Vladimir Aceti, Brayan Lopez, Pietro Pivotto | 3:02.60 | q, SB |
| 9 | 1 | 1 | Poland | Szymon Dziuba, Tymoteusz Zimny, Mateusz Rzeźniczak, Karol Zalewski | 3:02.95 | |
| 10 | 1 | 7 | Portugal | João Coelho, Mauro Pereira, Ericsson Tavares, Ricardo dos Santos | 3:03.59 | NR |
| 11 | 1 | 3 | Slovenia | Jure Grkman, Lovro Mesec Košir, Matic Ian Guček, Rok Ferlan | 3:03.68 | SB |
| 12 | 2 | 7 | Ukraine | Oleksiy Pozdnyakov, Danylo Danylenko, Mykyta Barabanov, Oleksandr Pohorilko | 3:04.15 | SB |
| 13 | 2 | 3 | Hungary | Dániel Ajide, Tamás Máté, Zoltán Wahl, Attila Molnár | 3:04.71 | |
| 14 | 2 | 2 | Turkey | Oğuzhan Kaya, Kubilay Ençü, Batuhan Altıntaş, İsmail Nezir | 3:06.68 | |
| 15 | 2 | 5 | Slovakia | Miroslav Marček, Patrik Dömötör, Martin Kučera, Šimon Bujna | 3:06.98 | |
| | 1 | 8 | Switzerland | Lionel Spitz, Charles Devantay, Filippo Moggi, Ricky Petrucciani | DNF | |

=== Final ===
| Rank | Lane | Nation | Athletes | Time | Notes |
|---|---|---|---|---|---|
| 1st place, gold medalist(s) | 8 | Great Britain | Matthew Hudson-Smith, Charlie Dobson, Lewis Davey, Alex Haydock-Wilson | 2:59.35 | SB |
| 2nd place, silver medalist(s) | 2 | Belgium | Alexander Doom, Julien Watrin, Kévin Borlée, Dylan Borlée | 2:59.49 | |
| 3rd place, bronze medalist(s) | 6 | France | Gilles Biron, Loïc Prévot, Téo Andant, Thomas Jordier | 2:59.64 | SB |
| 4 | 4 | Spain | Iñaki Cañal, Lucas Búa, Óscar Husillos, Samuel García | 3:00.54 | NR |
| 5 | 3 | Netherlands | Isayah Boers, Liemarvin Bonevacia, Jochem Dobber, Ramsey Angela | 3:01.34 | SB |
| 6 | 5 | Czech Republic | Matěj Krsek, Pavel Maslák, Michal Desenský, Patrik Šorm | 3:01.82 | |
| 7 | 7 | Germany | Marvin Schlegel, Patrick Schneider, Marc Koch, Manuel Sanders | 3:02.51 | |
| 8 | 1 | Italy | Davide Re, Vladimir Aceti, Brayan Lopez, Edoardo Scotti | 3:03.04 | |
