= Czech Athletics Federation =

Sports governing body in the Czech Republic

- Sport: Athletics
- Abbreviation: ČAS
- Affiliation: World Athletics
- Regional affiliation: European Athletic Association
- President: Libor Varhaník
- Director: František Fojt
- Coach: Tomáš Dvořák
- Replaced: Czechoslovak Athletic Federation

Official website
- www.atletika.cz
- (Czech Republic)

The Czech Athletics Federation (Czech: Český atletický svaz, Czech pronunciation: [ˈtʃɛskiː ˈatlɛtɪtskiː ˈsvas], abbreviated ČAS) is the governing body for the sport of athletics in the Czech Republic. Its president since 2009 is Libor Varhaník.

== History ==
The history of ČAS dates back to 1897 when Česká amatérská atletická unie (ČAAU, Czech Amateur Athletic Union) was founded. It originally covered wide range of sports including football, skiing or tennis but with the gradual establishment of separate organizations for these sports only athletics remained under ČAAU after 1911. Women's athletics, originally governed by handball federation was incorporated into ČAAU in 1928. After the end of World War II and the re-establishment of Czechoslovakia, hard negotiations took place in order to secure equal position for Slovak athletes who maintained a separate national organization during war years. This was reflected in name change to Československá amatérská atletická unie (ČSAAU, Czechoslovak Amateur Athletic Union) in 1947. Another name change to Československý atletický svaz (ČAS, Czechoslovak Athletic Federation) came one year later when the new communist government put in effect profound changes in the organization of sports. During the late communist period there were also (merely formal) subdivisions of ČAS, one for Czech and one for Slovak part of the federation named Český atletický svaz and Slovenský atletický zväz. After the dissolution of Czechoslovakia in 1992 these branches became full scale national governing bodies for athletics in their respective countries.

== Kits ==
The Czech Republic's kits are currently supplied by Joma.

== See also ==
- Czech records in athletics
