= List of Czech records in athletics =

The following are the national records in athletics in the Czech Republic maintained by the Czech Athletics Federation (ČAS). Of the records from the era of Czechoslovakia, those who represented a Czech club at the time of the record are included.

== Outdoor ==
Key to tables: Awaiting ratification Record not kept by ČAS Not ratified or later rescined by ČAS

=== Men ===
Event	Record	Athlete	Date	Meet	Place	Ref.	Video
100 y	9.62+ (−0.2 m/s)	Jan Veleba	31 May 2011	Golden Spike Ostrava	Ostrava, Czech Republic		
100 m	10.16 (+1.7 m/s)	Zdeněk Stromšík	18 July 2018		Tábor, Czech Republic		
100 m	10.16 (+1.6 m/s)	Jan Veleba	26 July 2019	Czech Championships	Brno, Czech Republic		
100 m	10.16 (+1.0 m/s)	Dominik Záleský	14 August 2021		Zlín, Czech Republic		
150 m (bend)	15.42 (+0.0 m/s)	Ondřej Macík	16 June 2026	Golden Spike Ostrava	Ostrava, Czech Republic		
200 m	20.39 (+0.2 m/s)	Ondřej Macík	30 July 2023	Czech Championships	Tábor, Czech Republic		
300 m	31.80	Pavel Maslák	28 June 2017	Golden Spike Ostrava	Ostrava, Czech Republic		
400 m	44.79	Pavel Maslák	9 May 2014	Qatar Athletic Super Grand Prix	Doha, Qatar		
500 m	1:00.35	Pavel Maslák	3 August 2013	Grand Prix of Cheb	Cheb, Czech Republic		
600 m	1:16.80	Daniel Nemeček	8 May 2016	26. Internationales Läufermeeting	Pliezhausen, Germany		
800 m	1:44.48	Jakub Dudycha	24 June 2025	Ostrava Golden Spike	Ostrava, Czech Republic		
1000 m	2:16.56	Lukáš Vydra	5 August 1998		Stockholm, Sweden		
1000 m	2:16.26	Jakub Dudycha	16 June 2026	Ostrava Golden Spike	Ostrava, Czech Republic		
1500 m	3:32.49	Jakub Holuša	20 July 2018	Herculis	Fontvieille, Monaco		
Mile	3:52.59	Jozef Plachý	3 July 1978	DN Galan	Stockholm, Sweden		
2000 m	4:57.60	Filip Sasinek	19 August 2020	Irena Szewinska Memorial	Bydgoszcz, Poland		
3000 m	7:46.72	Jan Pešava	27 June 1998		Saint Petersburg, Russia		
5000 m	13:24.99	Jiří Sýkora	1 August 1980	Olympic Games	Moscow, Soviet Union		
5 km (road)
5 km (road)	14:13+	Damián Vích	12 January 2025	10K Valencia Ibercaja	Valencia, Spain		
10,000 m	27:47.90	Jan Pešava	8 June 1998		Prague, Czech Republic		
10 km (road)	28:19	Martin Zajíc	11 January 2026	10K Valencia Ibercaja by Kiprun	Valencia, Spain		
15 km (road)	44:42	Ivan Uvizl	15 November 1992		Nijmegen, Netherlands		
20,000 m (track)	59:38.6+	Ivan Uvizl	25 September 1980		Ostrava, Czechoslovakia		
20 km (road)	1:00:24	Ivan Uvizl	13 March 1993	20 van Alphen	Alphen aan den Rijn, Netherlands		
One hour	20114.2 m	Ivan Uvizl	25 September 1980		Ostrava, Czechoslovakia		
Half marathon	1:01:31	Jan Pešava	4 October 1997	World Half Marathon Championships	Košice, Slovakia		
25,000 m (track)	1:16:36.4	Emil Zátopek	29 October 1955		Čelákovice, Czechoslovakia		
25 km (road)	1:15:28	Ivan Uvizl	5 May 1991		Berlin, Germany		
30,000 m (track)	1:34:54.2	Pavel Kantorek	31 October 1962		Stará Boleslav, Czechoslovakia		
Marathon	2:11:57	Karel David	23 May 1993	Hamburg Marathon	Hamburg, Germany		
24 hours (road)	271.182 km	Radek Brunner	18–19 October 2025	IAU 24 Hour World Championship	Albi, France		
110 m hurdles	13.27 (+1.1 m/s)	Petr Svoboda	14 June 2010	Josef Odložil Memorial	Prague, Czech Republic		
400 m hurdles	48.27	Jiří Mužík	3 August 1997	World Championships	Athens, Greece		
2000 m steeplechase	5:35.21	Damián Vích	3 September 2024	Copenhagen Athletics Games	Copenhagen, Denmark		
3000 m steeplechase	8:21.83	Tomáš Habarta	10 June 2024	European Championships	Rome, Italy		
High jump	2.36 m	Ján Zvara	23 August 1987		Prague, Czechoslovakia		
High jump	2.36 m	Jaroslav Bába	8 July 2005	Golden Gala	Rome, Italy		
Pole vault	5.83 m	Jan Kudlička	22 June 2016		Prague, Czech Republic		
Pole vault	5.83 m (Note: downhill runway)	Jan Kudlička	19 June 2013		Prague, Czech Republic		
Long jump	8.31 m (+1.4 m/s)	Radek Juška	27 August 2017	Universiade	Taipei, Taiwan		
Triple jump	17.53 m (+0.9 m/s)	Milan Mikuláš	17 July 1988		Prague, Czechoslovakia		
Shot put	22.01 m	Tomáš Staněk	2 June 2017	12th SoleCup	Schönebeck, Germany		
Discus throw	71.26 m	Imrich Bugár	25 May 1985		San Jose, United States		
Hammer throw	81.28 m	Vladimír Maška	25 September 1999		Pacov, Czech Republic		
Javelin throw	98.48 m WR	Jan Železný	25 May 1996		Jena, Germany		
Decathlon	9026 pts	Roman Šebrle	26–27 May 2001	Hypo-Meeting	Götzis, Austria		
Decathlon	100m (wind) / Long jump (wind) / Shot put / High jump / 400m / 110m H (wind) / Discus / Pole vault / Javelin / 1500m; 10.64 (±0.0 m/s) / 8.11 m (+1.9 m/s) / 15.33 m / 2.12 m / 47.79 / 13.92 / 47.92 m / 4.80 m / 70.16 m / 4:21.98						
Mile walk (track)	5:55.66	Vít Hlaváč	5 June 2022	Janusz Kusociński Memorial	Chorzów, Poland		
20,000 m walk (track)	1:22:48.4	Jiří Malysa	7 May 1994		Bergen, Norway		
20 km walk (road)	1:19:18	Jiří Malysa	17 June 2000	Oder-Neisse Grand Prix	Eisenhüttenstadt, Germany		
Two hours walk (track)	27310 m+	Ivo Piták	16 March 1986		Prague, Czechoslovakia		
30,000 m walk (track)	2:12:17.0	Ivo Piták	16 March 1986		Prague, Czechoslovakia		
35 km walk (road)	2:32:50	Vít Hlaváč	24 July 2022	World Championships	Eugene, United States		
50,000 m walk (track)	3:56:29 (Note: by federation source; 3:56:26 by other sources)	Vít Hlaváč	5 December 2020	National Championships	Trnava, Slovakia		
50 km walk (road)	3:49:08	Miloš Holuša	14 April 1996		Freiburg, Germany		
4 × 100 m relay	38.59	Czech Republic; Zdeněk Stromšík; Eduard Kubelík; Tomáš Němejc; Ondřej Macík	28 June 2025	European Team Championships	Madrid, Spain		
4 × 200 m relay	1:22.42	Sparta Prague; Jiří Mezihorák; Milan Bělošek; Karel Kopeček; Jindřich Roun	28 May 1988		Prague, Czechoslovakia		
4 × 400 m relay	3:00.99	Czech Republic; Matěj Krsek; Pavel Maslák; Vít Müller; Patrik Šorm	26 August 2023	World Championships	Budapest, Hungary		
4 × 800 m relay	7:19.6 h	Czechoslovakia; Petr Bláha; Pavel Pěnkava; Pavel Hruška; Jan Kasal	22 June 1966		London, United Kingdom		
4 × 1500 m relay	15:26.4 h	ÚDA Prague; Duan Čikel; Ivan Ullsperger; Stanislav Jungwirth; Alexander Zvolenský	22 June 1966		London, United Kingdom		

=== Women ===
Event	Record	Athlete	Date	Meet	Place	Ref.	Video
60 m	7.44 (−0.1 m/s)	Kateřina Čechová	3 August 2013	Grand Prix of Cheb	Cheb, Czech Republic		
100 y	10.49+ (+1.1 m/s)	Kateřina Čechová	31 May 2011	Golden Spike Ostrava	Ostrava, Czech Republic		
100 m	11.09 (+1.7 m/s)	Jarmila Kratochvílová	6 June 1981		Bratislava, Czechoslovakia		
100 m	11.01 (+0.9 m/s)	Karolína Maňasová	4 June 2026	Liese Prokop Memorial	St. Pölten, Austria		
150 m	17.09 (+0.6 m/s)	Nikola Bendová	8 September 2020	Golden Spike Ostrava	Ostrava, Czech Republic		
200 m	21.97 (+1.9 m/s)	Jarmila Kratochvílová	6 June 1981		Bratislava, Czechoslovakia		
200 m (straight)	23.53 (−0.3 m/s)	Denisa Rosolová	20 May 2012	Manchester City Games	Manchester, United Kingdom		
300 m	35.76	Lurdes Gloria Manuel	23 August 2026	Kamila Skolimowska Memorial	Chorzów, Poland		
300 m	34.95+	Jarmila Kratochvílová	18 August 1982		Zürich, Switzerland		
400 m	47.99	Jarmila Kratochvílová	10 August 1983	World Championships	Helsinki, Finland		
600 m	1:29.50	Adéla Holubová	5 May 2024	Internationales Läufermeeting	Pliezhausen, Germany		
800 m	1:53.28 WR	Jarmila Kratochvílová	26 July 1983		Munich, West Germany		
1000 m	2:35.06	Ludmila Formanová	17 July 1999		Nice, France		
1500 m	4:01.23	Kristiina Mäki	4 August 2021	Olympic Games	Tokyo, Japan		
Mile	4:21.54	Simona Vrzalová	22 July 2018	Diamond League	London, United Kingdom		
Mile (road)	4:38.39 Wo	Kristiina Sasínek Mäki	19 September 2026	World Road Running Championships	Copenhagen, Denmark		
2000 m	5:36.06	Kristiina Mäki	14 September 2021	Hanžeković Memorial	Zagreb, Croatia		
3000 m	8:51.69	Kristiina Mäki	21 June 2014	European Team Championships Super League	Braunschweig, Germany		
5000 m	15:31.15	Kristiina Mäki	23 June 2016		Sligo, Ireland		
5 km (road)	15:37	Petra Kaminková	19 September 2004		Prague, Czech Republic		
10,000 m	32:08.96	Moira Stewartová	28 May 2022	European 10,000m Cup	Pacé, France		
10 km (road)	31:05 Mx	Tereza Hrochová	11 January 2026	10K Valencia Ibercaja by Kiprun	Valencia, Spain		
15 km (road)	48:44+	Moira Stewartová	27 October 2024	Valencia Half Marathon	Valencia, Spain		
One hour	16422 m	Ivana Sekyrová	12 June 2008	Golden Spike Ostrava	Ostrava, Czech Republic		
One hour	16445 m Mx	Vlasta Rulcová	5 September 1981		Mladá Boleslav, Czechoslovakia		
One hour	16942 m +	Tereza Hrochová	24 October 2026	Pražská Hodinovka	Plzeň, Czech Republic		
20,000 m (track)	1:15:50.92	Ivana Sekyrová	22 November 2009		Plzeň, Czech Republic		
20,000 m (track)	1:11:08.30	Tereza Hrochová	24 October 2026	Pražská Hodinovka	Plzeň, Czech Republic		
20 km (road)	1:05:13+	Moira Stewartová	27 October 2024	Valencia Half Marathon	Valencia, Spain		
Half marathon	1:08:44	Moira Stewartová	27 October 2024	Valencia Half Marathon	Valencia, Spain		
25 km (road)	1:24:54+	Moira Stewartová	1 December 2024	Valencia Marathon	Valencia, Spain		
30 km (road)	1:41:49+	Moira Stewartová	1 December 2024	Valencia Marathon	Valencia, Spain		
Marathon	2:23:44	Moira Stewartová	1 December 2024	Valencia Marathon	Valencia, Spain		
100 m hurdles	12.73 (+0.8 m/s)	Lucie Škrobáková	5 July 2009		Kladno, Czech Republic		
200 m hurdles (straight)	25.86 (+1.0 m/s)	Denisa Rosolová	17 May 2014	Manchester City Games	Manchester, United Kingdom		
300 m hurdles	38.16	Zuzana Hejnová	2 August 2013	Grand Prix of Cheb	Cheb, Czech Republic		
400 m hurdles	52.83	Zuzana Hejnová	15 August 2013	World Championships	Moscow, Russia		
2000 m steeplechase	6:29.19	Soňa Kouřilová	5 May 2024	Internationales Läufermeeting	Pliezhausen, Germany		
3000 m steeplechase	9:41.73	Marcela Lustigová	13 June 2011	Josef Odložil Memorial	Prague, Czech Republic		
High jump	2.00 m	Zuzana Hlavoňová	5 June 2000		Prague, Czech Republic		
Pole vault	4.80 m	Amálie Švábíková	7 August 2024	Olympic Games	Paris, France		
Long jump	6.89 m	Jarmila Strejčková	18 September 1982		Prague, Czechoslovakia		
Triple jump	15.20 m (±0.0 m/s)	Šárka Kašpárková	4 August 1997	World Championships	Athens, Greece		
Shot put	22.32 m	Helena Fibingerová	20 August 1977		Nitra, Czechoslovakia		
Discus throw	74.56 m	Zdeňka Šilhavá	26 August 1984		Nitra, Czechoslovakia		
Hammer throw	72.47 m	Kateřina Šafránková	12 June 2016	Czech Clubs Championships	Kolín, Czech Republic		
Javelin throw	72.28 m WR	Barbora Špotáková	13 September 2008	World Athletics Final	Stuttgart, Germany		
Heptathlon	6460 pts	Eliška Klučinová	14–15 June 2014	TNT - Fortuna Meeting	Kladno, Czech Republic		
Heptathlon	100m H (wind) / High jump / Shot put / 200m (wind) / Long jump (wind) / Javelin / 800m; 13.81 (+1.8 m/s) / 1.90 m / 14.10 m / 24.67 (+0.8 m/s) / 6.43 m (+1.5 m/s) / 45.53 m / 2:16.47						
Decathlon	6749 pts	Barbora Špotáková	25–26 September 2004	Decastar	Talence, France		
Decathlon	12.99 (100 m), 5.02 m (long jump), 15.42 m (shot put), 1.56 m (high jump), 58.42 (400 m) / 13.40 (100 m hurdles), 36.39 m (discus), 2.60 m (pole vault), 60.17 m (javelin), 6:01.61 (1500 m)						
Mile walk	6:23.90	Ema Klimentová	1 July 2026	Raiffeisen Austrian Open	Eisenstadt, Austria		
3000 m walk (track)	11:52.38	Anežka Drahotová	26 May 2015	Golden Spike Ostrava	Ostrava, Czech Republic		
5000 m walk (track)	21:34.33	Lucie Pelantová	2 June 2012	Czech Clubs League	Kladno, Czech Republic		
5 km walk (road)	21:45+	Anežka Drahotová	4 May 2014	IAAF World Race Walking Cup	Taicang, China		
10,000 m walk (track)	44:15.87	Anežka Drahotová	18 July 2013	European Junior Championships	Rieti, Italy		
10 km walk (road)	43:40	Anežka Drahotová	4 May 2014	IAAF World Race Walking Cup	Taicang, China		
15 km walk (road)	1:05.55+	Anežka Drahotová	16 March 2014	Lugano Trophy – 12th Memorial Mario Albisetti	Lugano, Switzerland		
20 km walk (road)	1:26:53	Anežka Drahotová	17 May 2015	European Race Walking Cup	Murcia, Spain		
35 km walk (road)	2:49:06	Tereza Ďurdiaková	24 August 2023	World Championships	Budapest, Hungary		
50 km walk (road)							
4 × 100 m relay	42.98	Czechoslovakia; Štěpánka Sokolová; Radislava Šoborová; Taťána Kocembová; Jarmila Kratochvílová	18 August 1982	Weltklasse Zürich	Zürich, Switzerland		
4 × 200 m relay	1:39.9 h	Zbrojovka Brno; Zuzana Glosová; Alena Vozáková; Eva Putnová; Jana Šmerdová	10 September 1968		Brno, Czechoslovakia		
Swedish relay	2:07.16	Czech Republic; Ester Parohová; Viktorie Jánská; Terezie Táborská; Eliška Kramešová	29 July 2023	European Youth Olympic Festival	Maribor, Slovenia		
4 × 400 m relay	3:20.32	Czechoslovakia; Taťána Kocembová; Milena Matějkovičová; Zuzana Moravčíková; Jarmila Kratochvílová	14 August 1983	World Championships	Helsinki, Finland		
4 × 800 m relay	9:15.2 h	Slávia VŠ Prague; Ivana Brožová; Věra Mertlíková; Jindřiška Červená; Miluše Hrstková	12 October 1974		Prague, Czechoslovakia		

=== Mixed ===
Event	Record	Athlete	Date	Meet	Place	Ref.
4 × 100 m relay	42.89	Czech Republic; Jindřich Stibral; Johanka Šafářová; Jan Jirka; Klára Kaděrová	22 August 2025	Memorial Van Damme	Brussels, Belgium	
4 × 400 m relay	3:11.98	Czech Republic; Matěj Krsek; Tereza Petržilková; Patrik Šorm; Lada Vondrová	19 August 2023	World Championships	Budapest, Hungary	

== Indoor ==
=== Men ===
Event	Record	Athlete	Date	Meet	Place	Ref.
50 m	5.73	František Ptáčník	26 January 1985		Prague, Czechoslovakia	
50 m	5.73	Jiří Valík	10 February 1990		Prague, Czechoslovakia	
60 m	6.58	František Ptáčník	21 February 1987	European Championships	Liévin, France	
200 m	20.52	Pavel Maslák	16 February 2014	Czech Championships	Prague, Czech Republic	
300 m	32.15	Pavel Maslák	9 February 2014	Indoor Flanders Meeting	Ghent, Belgium	
400 m	45.24	Pavel Maslák	8 March 2014	World Championships	Sopot, Poland	
500 m	1:00.36	Pavel Maslák	25 February 2014	Prague Indoor	Prague, Czech Republic	
600 m	1:16.88	Filip Šnejdr	12 January 2018		Prague, Czech Republic	
800 m	1:45.97 OT	Roman Oravec	6 February 1999		Ames, United States	
800 m	1:46.09	Jakub Holuša	31 January 2010	BW-Bank Meeting	Karlsruhe, Germany	
1000 m	2:19.51	Roman Oravec	25 January 2002	BW-Bank Meeting	Karlsruhe, Germany	
1500 m	3:36.53	Filip Sasínek	17 February 2021	Copernicus Cup	Toruń, Poland	
Mile	4:00.07	Filip Sasínek	17 February 2016		Athlone, Ireland	
3000 m	7:48.8	Lubomír Tesáček	28 January 1981		Prague, Czechoslovakia	
5000 m	13:39.0	Lubomír Tesáček	22 February 1983		Prague, Czechoslovakia	
50 m hurdles	6.41	Igor Kováč	15 February 1992		Prague, Czechoslovakia	
60 m hurdles	7.44	Petr Svoboda	27 February 2010	Czech Championships	Prague, Czech Republic	
300 m hurdles	37.26 OT	Bořek Pešta	21 January 2026	Tampere Meeting	Tampere, Finland	
High jump	2.37 m	Jaroslav Bába	5 February 2005	Hochsprung mit Musik	Arnstadt, Germany	
Pole vault	5.81 m	Adam Ptáček	7 February 2003		Chemnitz, Germany	
Long jump	8.18 m	Milan Gombala	16 February 1992		Prague, Czechoslovakia	
Triple jump	17.23 m	Ján Čado	2 March 1985	European Championships	Athens, Greece	
Shot put	22.17 m	Tomáš Staněk	6 February 2018	PSD Bank Meeting	Düsseldorf, Germany	
Heptathlon	6438 pts	Roman Šebrle	6–7 March 2004	World Championships	Budapest, Hungary	
Heptathlon	60m / Long jump / Shot put / High jump / 60m H / Pole vault / 1000m; 6.97 / 7.96 m / 16.28 m / 2.11 m / 7.95 / 4.80 m / 2:39.67					
5000 m walk	19:01.0	Jiří Malysa	11 January 1994		Ostrava, Czech Republic	
4 × 200 m relay	1:25.29	Czech Republic; Ivan Šlehobr; Martin Morkes; Walter Pilch; Jiří Mužík	15 February 1997		Vienna, Austria	
4 × 400 m relay	3:04.09	Czech Republic; Daniel Němeček; Patrik Šorm; Jan Tesař; Pavel Maslák	8 March 2015	European Championships	Prague, Czech Republic	

=== Women ===
Event	Record	Athlete	Date	Meet	Place	Ref.
50 m	6.18+	Karolína Maňasová	3 February 2026	Czech Indoor Gala	Ostrava, Czech Republic	
50 m	6.0 h	Taťána Kocembová	21 January 1984		Ostrava, Czechoslovakia	
60 m	7.05	Karolína Maňasová	20 January 2026	Ostrava Indoor I	Ostrava, Czech Republic	
150 m	17.64	Klára Seidlová	12 January 2018		Prague, Czech Republic	
200 m	22.76	Jarmila Kratochvílová	28 January 1981		Vienna, Austria	
300 m	36.94	Denisa Rosolová	5 March 2010	Meeting Pas de Calais	Liévin, France	
400 m	49.59	Jarmila Kratochvílová	7 March 1982	European Championships	Milan, Italy	
800 m	1:56.90	Ludmila Formanová	7 March 1999	World Championships	Maebashi, Japan	
1000 m	2:39.25	Simona Vrzalová	10 February 2019	Meeting Pas de Calais	Liévin, France	
1500 m	4:05.73	Simona Vrzalová	12 February 2019	Czech Indoor Gala	Ostrava, Czech Republic	
Mile	4:35.83	Ivana Kubešová	2 February 1992		Bordeaux, France	
3000 m	8:49.15	Andrea Šuldesová	3 February 1999		Erfurt, Germany	
5000 m	16:24.01	Barbara Kuncová	12 February 2005		Fayetteville, United States	
50 m hurdles	7.00	Blanka Henešová	23 February 1991		Prague, Czechoslovakia	
60 m hurdles	7.95	Lucie Škrobáková	6 March 2009	European Championships	Turin, Italy	
3000 m steeplechase	9:54.2 ^{[WB]}	Marcela Lustigová	11 February 2010	Botnia Games	Korsholm, Finland	
High jump	1.99 m	Barbora Laláková	14 February 2006		Banská Bystrica, Slovakia	
Pole vault	4.72 m	Amálie Švábíková	18 February 2023	Czech Championships	Ostrava, Czech Republic	
Long jump	6.64 m	Denisa Ščerbová	6 February 2005		Bratislava, Slovakia	
Long jump	6.64 m	Denisa Ščerbová	3 March 2007	European Championships	Birmingham, United Kingdom	
Triple jump	14.87 m	Šárka Kašpárková	7 March 1999	World Championships	Maebashi, Japan	
Shot put	22.50 m (Note: outdoor mark ratified as absolute record)	Helena Fibingerová	19 February 1977		Jablonec, Czechoslovakia	
Weight throw	18.45 m	Pavla Kuklová	10 February 2018	Tiger Paw Invitational	Clemson, United States	
Pentathlon	4687 pts	Eliška Klučinová	6 March 2015	European Championships	Prague, Czech Republic	
Pentathlon	60m H / High jump / Shot put / Long jump / 800m; 8.53 / 1.86 m / 15.07 m / 6.15 m / 2:17.26					
3000 m walk	12:28.76	Dana Vavřačová	4 March 1990		Glasgow, United Kingdom	
4 × 200 m relay	1:34.69	Czech Republic; Hana Benešová; Ludmila Formanová; Naděžda Koštovalová; Erika Suchovská	17 February 1996		Vienna, Austria	
4 × 400 m relay	3:25.31	Czech Republic; Lada Vondrová; Nikoleta Jíchová; Tereza Petržilková; Lurdes Gloria Manuel	9 March 2025	European Championships	Apeldoorn, Netherlands	
4 × 800 m relay	9:08.59	Czech Republic; Petra Ivanová; Martina Klesnilová; Kateřina Blažková; Sylva Škabrahová	31 January 2008		Linz, Austria	

=== Mixed ===
Event	Record	Athlete	Date	Meet	Place	Ref.
4 × 400 m relay	3:19.17	Czech Republic; Michal Desenský; Marcela Pírková; Milan Ščibráni; Tereza Petržilková	6 March 2025	European Championships	Apeldoorn, Netherlands	
