= Jean Paul Bredau =

German sprinter (born 1999)

Sport
- Sport: Athletics
- Event: Sprinting
Medal record
Men's athletics
Representing Germany
European Championships
Bronze medal – third place	2024 Rome	4 × 400 m relay

Jean Paul Bredau is a German sprinter. He competed in the 4 × 400 metres men's relay at the 2020 and 2024 Olympic Games. He was a bronze medalist in the 4 × 400 m relay at the 2024 European Athletics Championships.

== Career ==
He competed in the 4 × 400 m men's relay at the delayed 2020 Summer Olympics in August 2021 in Tokyo, Japan, in which his team was last in the heat, with a time of 3:03.62.

At the 2023 World Athletics Championships in Budapest, Hungary, he finished seventh in the final of the mixed 4 × 400 m relay. At the Championships, he also ran in the German team in the men's 4 × 400 metres relay. At the ISTAF Berlin in September 2023, he ran a personal best time of 44.96 seconds for the 400 metres. The time moved him into the top-ten all-time German list and was the fastest by a German for 21 years.

In May 2024, he ran as part of the German 4 × 400 m relay team at the 2024 World Relays Championships in Nassau, Bahamas which qualified for the 2024 Paris Olympics, alongside Manuel Sanders, Marc Koch and Tyrel Prenz. He was part of the German team that won bronze at the 2024 European Athletics Championships in Rome in June 2024. Koch, Sanders, Bredau and Emil Agyekum competed in the men's 4 × 400 metres relay at the 2024 Paris Olympics, and although they ran a season's best time of 3:00.29, they did not qualify for the final. However, he managed to qualify for the final of the individual men´s 400m placing 7th overall.

In 2025, he competed at the World Athletics Championships in Tokyo where he was eliminated in the heats with a time of 46.05s.

In 2026, he achieved a new indoor personal best of 45,94s with in Luxembourg. Later, he competed at the 2026 European Athletics Championship in Birmingham where he qualified for the 400m final and secured the fifth place with another sub-45s time in the final. It marks the best German men's result in the 400m on European level since 2002. In addition, he qualified for the men´s 4x400m final alongside Manuel Sanders, Thorben Finke and Thilo Traue. They secured the seventh place in the relay final with Florian Kroll replacing Manuel Sanders.

On a national level, he secured the German national title in the 400m outdoors in 2024 and 2025, while winning the 400m indoors in 2024 and 2026.

== Personal life ==
In 2024, he apologised for comments which criticised the German Athletics Association for their decision to omit his girlfriend Luna Bulmahn from the German mixed 4 × 400 metres relay team at the 2024 Olympic Games. The association had selected Alica Schmidt instead, despite Bulmahn running the second quickest time in the relay pool.

In 2026, he married the German 400m sprinter Luna Bredau (maiden name: Bulmahn).

== Competition record ==
Year	Competition	Venue	Position	Event	Notes
Representing Germany
2018	World Junior Championships	Tampere, Finland	6th	4 × 400 m	3:07.80
2021	Olympic Games	Tokyo, Japan	16th (h)	4 × 400 m	3:03.62
2023	World Championships	Budapest, Hungary	11th (h)	4 × 400 m	3:00.67
2024	European Championships	Rome, Italy	7th	400 m	45.11
2024	European Championships	Rome, Italy	3rd	4 × 400 m	3:00.82
2024	Olympic Games	Paris, France	6th (rep)	400 m	45.40
2024	Olympic Games	Paris, France	9th (h)	4 × 400 m relay	3:00.29
2025	World Championships	Tokyo, Japan	43rd (h)	400 m	46.05

== Personal bests ==
Outdoor

- 200 metres – 21.43 (+0.9 m/s, Wetzlar 2023)
- 400 metres – 44.96 (Berlin 2023)

Indoor

- 200 metres – 21.74 (Berlin 2022)
- 400 metres – 45,94s (Luxembourg 2026)
