= Simon Boypa =

French sprinter

Personal information
- Nationality: French
- Born: 19 March 1999 (age 27) Paris, France
- Height: 1.73 m (5 ft 8 in)
- Weight: 66 kg (146 lb)

Sport
- Sport: Athletics
- Event: 400 metres
- Club: EA Cergy-Pontoise Athlétisme

Achievements and titles
- Personal bests: Outdoor; 400 m: 46.01 (Caen 2022); Indoor; 400 m: 46.90 (Aubière 2023)
Medal record
Men's athletics
Representing France
European Championships
Bronze medal – third place	2022 Munich	4×400 m relay
European Youth Olympic Festival
Gold medal – first place	2015 Tbilisi	4×400 m relay

Simon Boypa (born 19 March 1999) is a French sprinter who specializes in the 400 metres. He won a bronze medal in the 4×400 m relay at the 2022 European Athletics Championships.
