= Loïc Prévot =

French sprinter

Personal information
- Nationality: French
- Born: 19 February 1998 (age 28) Remire-Montjoly, French Guiana

Sport
- Sport: Athletics
- Event: 400 metres
Medal record
Men's athletics
Representing France
World Championships
Silver medal – second place	2023 Budapest	4×400 m relay
European Championships
Bronze medal – third place	2022 Munich	4×400 m relay
European Team Championships
Silver medal – second place	2019 Bydgoszcz	4×400 m relay

Loïc Prévot (French pronunciation: [lɔik pʁevo]; born 10 February 1998, in Remire-Montjoly) is a French sprinter.

His personal best at 400 metres is 46.21 (Geneva, 15 June 2019). He anchored the French relay second in Super League at 2019 European Team Championships in Bydgoszcz, giving the podium to France for just half a point.

He also won the bronze medal at 2019 European Athletics U23 Championships.
