= Lada Vondrová =

Czech sprinter

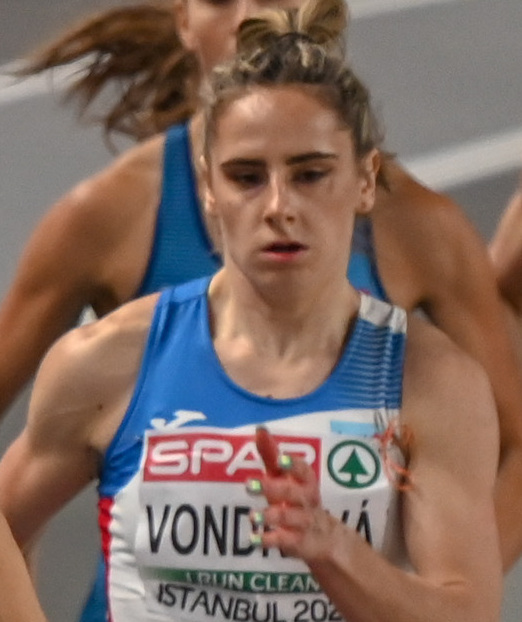
- Vondrová during the 2023 European Athletics Indoor Championships

Personal information
- Born: 6 September 1999 (age 26) Nové Město na Moravě, Vysočina Region, Czech Republic
- Height: 166 cm (5 ft 5 in)
- Weight: 62 kg (137 lb)

Sport
- Country: Czech Republic
- Sport: Athletics
- Event: Sprinting
- Club: University Sports Club Prague
- Coached by: František Ptáčník

Achievements and titles
- Personal best: 400 m: 50.92 (Budapest 2023)
Medal record
Women's athletics
Representing the Czech Republic
World Championships
Bronze medal – third place	2023 Budapest	4×400 m mixed
European Games
Gold medal – first place	2023 Kraków-Małopolska	4×400 m mixed
Silver medal – second place	2019 Minsk	4×400 m mixed
European Indoor Championships
Bronze medal – third place	2025 Apeldoorn	4x400 m relay
European U23 Championships
Gold medal – first place	2021 Tallinn	400 m
Gold medal – first place	2021 Tallinn	4×400 m relay
Silver medal – second place	2019 Gävle	400 m

Lada Vondrová (born 6 September 1999) is a Czech track and field athlete who specializes in sprint races. She won several Czech national titles.

== Career ==
Vondrová competed in the women's 400 metres at the 2018 IAAF World Indoor Championships where she finished 13th in the semifinal.

At the 2019 World Athletics Championships held in Doha, Qatar, Vondrová finished the semifinals of the 400 m event in 20th place.

She competed at the 2020 Tokyo Olympics in the 400 metres, where she got a personal best of 51.14 seconds.

At the 2023 European Athletics Team Championships, Vondrová competed in the 200 metres, where she finished 11th overall with a time of 23.44 seconds. Later the same day, she would anchor the Czech mixed 4 × 400 m relay team to a victory in a new national record of time of 3:12.34, an improvement of 2.5 seconds over the previous national record.

Later the same year, she would compete at the 2023 World Athletics Championships, in the mixed 4 × 400 m relay as well as the individual 400 metres. The team consisting of Matěj Krsek, Tereza Petržilková, Patrik Šorm and Lada Vondrová finished 3rd in the second heat and would go on to take the bronze medal in the final, with a further improved national record time of 3:11.98. In the individual 400m, Vondrová would improve her personal best to 50.92 seconds in the heats. She would finish 19th in the semifinals, not progressing to the final.

== Achievements ==
=== Personal bests ===
- 100 metres – 11.49 (-0.1 m/s, Ústí nad Orlicí 2022)
- 200 metres – 23.28 (-1.3 m/s, Cheb 2022)
- 400 metres – 50.92 (Budapest 2023)
  - 400 metres indoor – 51.57 (Ostrava 2023)

=== National titles ===
- Czech Athletics Championships (3)
  - 400 metres: 2019, 2022, 2023
- Czech Indoor Athletics Championships (7)
  - 200 metres: 2020, 2023
  - 400 metres: 2019, 2020, 2021, 2022
  - 4 × 200 m relay: 2022
