= Athletics at the 2015 European Youth Summer Olympic Festival =

The athletics competition at the 2015 European Youth Summer Olympic Festival was held at the Athletics Stadium of Tbilisi in Tbilisi, Georgia between 27 July and 1 August. A total of 36 events were held, evenly divided between the sexes, repeating the programme of the previous edition.

The competition was preceded the World Athletics Leaders Seminar, which included European Athletics president Svein Arne Hansen and IAAF Vice President Sergey Bubka among its attendees. The games' athletics came ahead of the city's hosting of the 2016 European Athletics Youth Championships – the first edition of the competition, which will be held in the even years between the European Youth Festival's events.

French jumper Enzo Hodebar was the most successful athlete in the sport, being the only youth to take two individual titles with his long jump and triple jump wins. Serbia had two double medallists in the 1500 metres and 3000 metres: Elzan Bibić won a gold and a silver in the boys' events while Tamara Mićević was a double runner-up on the girl's side. The overall standard of winning performances was down on previous years, but three games records were set in the girls' section: Viivi Lehikoinen set a time of 57.74 seconds for the 400 metres hurdles, Elizaveta Bondarenko improved the pole vault standard to 4.20 m (13 ft 9 1/4 in), and Carolina Visca set a javelin throw games record of 60.09 m (197 ft 1 1/2 in).

France easily topped the medal table with six gold medals among its haul of twelve – its performance in athletics accounted for most of the medals at the games, in which it placed third in the overall medal table. Russian had the next highest number of golds, at four, while the Netherlands had the second-highest total with six medals including three gold. Ukraine ranked third with three golds and two silver medals. In total athletes from thirty nations reached the podium at the competition. The host nation failed to appear on the medal table.

== Medal summary ==
=== Boys ===
Event	Gold		Silver		Bronze	
100 m	Henrik Roger Larsson; Sweden	10.72	Lauri Tuomilehto; Finland	10.82	Pol Retamal; Spain	10.92
200 m	Florian Barbier; France	21.52	Matěj Krsek; Czech Republic	21.90	Bryan Pronk; Netherlands	21.93
400 m	Ihar Zubko; Belarus	47.44	Mahsum Korkmaz; Turkey	48.51	Gregor Grahovac; Slovenia	48.56
800 m	Marino Bloudek; Croatia	1:53.76	Eliott Crestan; Belgium	1:54.02	Javier Mirón; Spain	1:54.92
1500 m	Kevin McGrath; Ireland	4:01.11	Elzan Bibić; Serbia	4:01.62	Pierre Proust; France	4:02.35
3000 m	Elzan Bibić; Serbia	8:50.10	Nurkan Dagtekin; Turkey	8:54.91	Tindaro Lisa; Italy	8:56.65
110 metres hurdles (91.4 cm)	Julian Andrianavalona; France	13.84	Luis Salort; Spain	13.85	Cristian Faidiga; Italy	14.11
400 metres hurdles (84.0 cm)	Aleix Porras; Spain	52.52	Tuur Bras; Belgium	53.63	Marc-Antoine Saban; France	53.82
2000 m steeplechase	Stefan Schmid; Austria	6:10.03	Matevz Cimermancic; Slovenia	6:13.66	Timothée Mischler; France	6:15.19
4 × 100 m relay	France; Luc Bertrand; Simon Boypa; Marc-Antoine Saban; Florian Barbier	42.11	Spain; Luis Salort; Alejandro Peiro; Jesus Gómez; Pol Retamal	42.46	Slovakia; Adrián Baran; Jakub Benda; Simon Rigász; Marcel Žilavý	44.29
High jump	Dmytro Nikitin; Ukraine	2.12	Ryan Carthy Walsh; Ireland	2.09	Adonios Merlos; Greece	2.06
Pole vault	Bo Kanda Lita Bähre; Germany	4.92	Taras Shevtsov; Ukraine	4.60	Riccardo Klotz; Austria	4.60
Long jump	Enzo Hodebar; France	7.32	Ioan Bogdan Sitoianu; Romania	6.89	Uladzislau Bulakhau; Belarus	6.88
Triple jump	Enzo Hodebar; France	15.24	Razvan Cristian Grecu; Romania	15.03	Andrea Dallavalle; Italy	14.74
Shot put (5 kg)	Arttu Korkeasalo; Finland	18.98	Ariel Atias; Israel	17.67	Vadzim Charnyshou; Belarus	17.60
Discus (1.5 kg)	Ferenc Aranyi; Hungary	57.45	Giorgios Koniarakis; Cyprus	56.13	Kornel Warszawski; Poland	51.43
Hammer throw (5 kg)	Mykhailo Havryliuk; Ukraine	75.20	Mihaita Andrei Micu; Romania	70.18	Dzmitry Baraukou; Belarus	68.05
Javelin (700 g)	Ilia Tuzov; Russia	69.67	Matīss Velps; Latvia	66.21	Bartul Zemunik; Croatia	65.32

=== Girls ===
Event	Gold		Silver		Bronze	
100 metres	Ciara Neville (IRL)	12.01	Klaudia Adamek (POL)	12.16	Ingvild Meinseth (NOR)	12.17
200 metres	Marine Mignon (FRA)	24.07	Gina Akpe-Moses (IRL) Anna Kerbachová (CZE)	24.49	Not awarded	
400 metres	Andrea Miklós (ROU)	53.68	Yasmin Giger (SUI)	55.02	Katarina Sekulić (SRB)	55.09
800 metres	Malin Edland (NOR)	2:07.43	Lilyana Georgieva (BUL)	2:07.89	Adrianna Czapla (POL)	2:08.84
1500 metres	Merel van den Marel (NED)	4:33.98	Tamara Mićević (SRB)	4:34.35	Beata Topka (POL)	4:35.33
3000 metres	Diane van Es (NED)	9:58.49	Tamara Mićević (SRB)	9:59.07	Justine Tinck (BEL)	9:59.81
100 metres hurdles (76.2 cm)	Kristina Kleshcheva (RUS)	13.75	Paula Sprudzane (LAT)	13.75	Nika Glojnaric (SLO)	13.84
400 metres hurdles (76.2 cm)	Viivi Lehikoinen (FIN)	57.74 CR	Iman Jean (FRA)	1:00.57	Marie Skjaeggestad (NOR)	1:01.06
2000 metres steeplechase	Jasmijn Bakker (NED)	6:48.80	Anastasiia Makhrova (RUS)	6:50.39	Tira Pavuk (HUN)	6:52.59
4 × 100 m relay	Norway; Live Haugstad Hilton; Ida Eikeng; Tonje Fjellet Kristiansen; Ingvild Meinseth	46.54	France; Whitney Tie; Sacha Alessandrini; Iman Jean; Marine Mignon	46.67	Belgium; Celine Gautier; Laures Bauwens; Hanne Vancamp; Hanne Claus	46.78
High jump	Ekaterina Prikhodkova (RUS)	1.80	Maja Nilsson (SWE)	1.80	Sommer Lecky (IRL)	1.80
Pole vault	Elizaveta Bondarenko (RUS)	4.20 CR	Lisa Gunnarsson (SWE)	4.15	Amalie Svabikova (CZE)	3.90
Long jump	Maja Bedrac (SLO)	6.01	Klinta Blusina (LAT)	5.93	Antonia Kohl (GER)	5.91
Triple jump	Georgiana Anitei (ROU)	13.50 w	Sonia Da Konseisao Kussekala (UKR)	13.30 w	Eva Pepelnak (SLO)	12.87 w
Shot put (3 kg)	Marharyta Lukashenko (UKR)	16.30	Jessica Schilder (NED)	16.05	Emely Gross (GER)	16.00
Discus throw (1 kg)	Alexandra Emilianov (MDA)	51.93	Helena Leveelahti (FIN)	48.06	Dara Obot (NED)	46.30
Hammer throw (3 kg)	Tatsiana Ramanovich (BLR)	65.95	Kiira Väänänen (FIN)	64.24	Dunya Ezgi Sayan (TUR)	61.61
Javelin throw (500 g)	Carolina Visca (ITA)	60.09 CR	Jona Aigouy (FRA)	54.70	Arianne Duarte Morais (NOR)	52.64

== Medal table ==
Rank	Nation	Gold	Silver	Bronze	Total
1	France (FRA)	6	3	3	12
2	Russia (RUS)	4	1	0	5
3	Ukraine (UKR)	3	2	0	5
4	Netherlands (NED)	3	1	2	6
5	Finland (FIN)	2	3	0	5
5	Romania (ROU)	2	3	0	5
7	Ireland (IRL)	2	2	1	5
8	Belarus (BLR)	2	0	3	5
8	Norway (NOR)	2	0	3	5
10	Serbia (SRB)	1	3	1	5
11	Spain (ESP)	1	2	2	5
12	Sweden (SWE)	1	2	0	3
13	Slovenia (SLO)	1	1	3	5
14	Italy (ITA)	1	0	3	4
15	Germany (GER)	1	0	2	3
16	Austria (AUT)	1	0	1	2
16	Croatia (CRO)	1	0	1	2
16	Hungary (HUN)	1	0	1	2
19	Moldova (MDA)	1	0	0	1
20	Latvia (LAT)	0	3	0	3
21	Belgium (BEL)	0	2	2	4
22	Czech Republic (CZE)	0	2	1	3
22	Turkey (TUR)	0	2	1	3
24	Poland (POL)	0	1	3	4
25	Bulgaria (BUL)	0	1	0	1
25	Cyprus (CYP)	0	1	0	1
25	Israel (ISR)	0	1	0	1
25	Switzerland (SUI)	0	1	0	1
29	Greece (GRE)	0	0	1	1
29	Slovakia (SVK)	0	0	1	1
Totals (30 entries)		36	37	35	108
