= Ryan Willie =

American athlete (born 2002)

Personal information
- Nationality: American
- Born: 24 June 2002 (age 24)
- Home town: Potomac, Maryland
- Education: Bullis School

Sport
- Sport: Athletics
- Event: 400 m
- College team: Florida Gators

Achievements and titles
- Personal best(s): 200 m: 20.51 (Gainesville, 2023); 400 m: 44.25 (Austin, 2023)
Medal record
Men's athletics
Representing the United States
World Championships
Gold medal – first place	2023 Budapest	4 × 400 m mixed

Ryan Willie (born 24 June 2002) is an American sprinter who specializes in the 400 meters.

== Early life ==
Willie lost his mother, Marla, to breast cancer in 2015. He attended Bullis School in Potomac, Maryland, where he excelled in track and field.

== Career ==
Running for the University of Florida, he ran a personal best time of 44.25 seconds for the 400 m to finish second in the final of the NCAA Championships held in Austin, Texas in 2023.

Competing at the 2023 USA Outdoor Track and Field Championships, in Eugene, Oregon, he reached the final of the 400 m competition with the third fastest time. In July 2023, he competed in the 400 m at the Diamond League events in Silesia and London. He was selected for the 2023 World Athletics Championships in Budapest in August 2023.

In April 2024, he was selected as part of the American team for the 2024 World Athletics Relays in Nassau, Bahamas.

== Personal bests ==
- 200 m – 20.51 (Gainesville 2023)
  - Indoor – 20.84i (Fayetteville 2023)
- 300 m – 32.91i (Clemson 2022)
- 400 m – 44.25 (Austin 2023)
  - Indoor – 44.93i (Albuquerque 2023)
