= Marc Koch =

German athlete (born 1994)

Personal information
- Born: 24 May 1994 (age 32) Berlin, Germany
- Height: 1.88 m (6 ft 2 in)

Sport
- Sport: Athletics
- Event: Sprint

Achievements and titles
- Personal best(s): 400 m: 46.10 (Regensburg, 2024)
Medal record
Men's athletics
Representing Germany
European Championships
Bronze medal – third place	2024 Rome	4 × 400 m relay
European U23 Championships
Bronze medal – third place	2015 Tallinn	4 × 400 m relay

Marc Koch (born 24 May 1994) is a German sprinter. He was the German national indoor champion over 400 metres in 2017. He won a bronze medal in the Men's 4 × 400 m relay at the 2024 European Athletics Championships.

== Career ==
He was a bronze medalist at the 2015 European Athletics U23 Championships in Tallinn in the men's 4 × 400 m relay.

He became the German national indoor champion over 400 metres in February 2017 in Leipzig. Subsequently, he competed at the 2017 European Athletics Indoor Championships in Belgrade in March 2017.

He was a member of the German men's 4 × 400 metres relay team, alongside Marvin Schlegel, Patrick Schneider and Manuel Sanders, which qualified for the final in a photo-finish and then finished seventh overall at the 2022 European Athletics Championships in Munich in August 2022. He was also named in the German relay pool for the 2022 World Athletics Championships in Eugene, Oregon.

At the 2023 World Athletics Championships in Budapest, Hungary, he ran in the German team in the 4 × 400 metres relay.

He set a new personal best for the 400 metres of 46.10 in Regensburg in May 2024. That month, he ran as part of the Men's 4 × 400 m relay team at the 2024 World Relays Championships in Nassau, Bahamas which qualified for the 2024 Paris Olympics, alongside Sanders, Jean Paul Bredau and Tyrel Prenz. He ran as the German team that won bronze at the 2024 European Athletics Championships in Rome in June 2024. Koch, Sanders, Bredau and Emil Agyekum competed in the men's 4 × 400 metres relay at the 2024 Paris Olympics, and although they ran a season's best time of 3:00.29, they did not qualify for the final.

== Personal life ==
From Berlin, he and his wife Saskia run a coffee roasting business.
