= Tereza Ďurdiaková =

Czech race walker

Personal information
- Nationality: Czech
- Born: 20 February 1991 (age 35) Brno, Czechoslovakia

Sport
- Sport: Athletics
- Event: Race walking

Tereza Ďurdiaková (born 20 February 1991) is a Czech race walking athlete. She qualified to represent the Czech Republic at the 2020 Summer Olympics in Tokyo 2021, competing in women's 20 kilometres walk.

In 2023, she competed at the 2023 World Athletics Championships and finished 10th in new national record 2:49:06.
