= Gilles Biron =

French sprinter (born 1995)

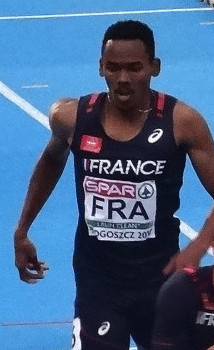
- Biron in 2017

Personal information
- Nationality: French
- Born: 13 April 1995 (age 31) Schœlcher, Martinique

Sport
- Sport: Athletics
- Event: 400 metres

Achievements and titles
- Personal best: 45.64 (La Chaux-de-Fonds 2022)
Medal record
Men's athletics
Representing France
World Championships
Silver medal – second place	2023 Budapest	4×400 m relay
European Championships
Bronze medal – third place	2022 Munich	4×400 m relay
European Indoor Championships
Silver medal – second place	2023 Istanbul	4×400 m relay
Representing Martinique
Central American and Caribbean Games
Bronze medal – third place	2023 San Salvador	400 m

Gilles Biron (born 13 April 1995) is a French sprinter. He competed in the men's 4 × 400 metres relay event at the 2020 Summer Olympics.
