= Tereza Petržilková =

Czech sprinter

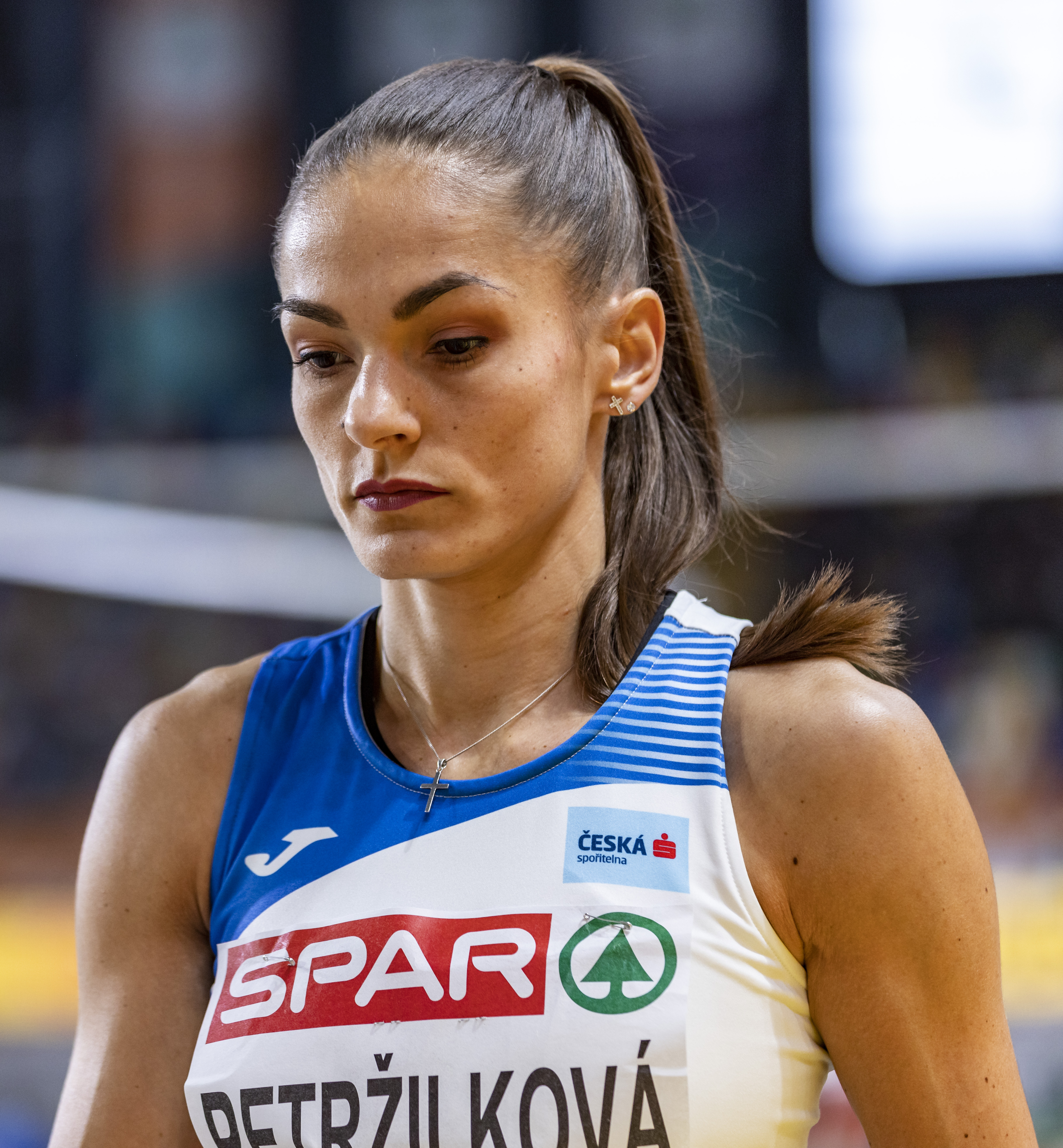
- Petržilková at the 2023 European Athletics Indoor Championships

Personal information
- Nationality: Czech
- Born: 10 September 1993 (age 32) Strakonice, Czech Republic
- Height: 169 cm (5 ft 7 in)
- Weight: 55 kg (121 lb)

Sport
- Country: Czech Republic
- Sport: Athletics
- Event: Sprinting
- Club: AK ŠKODA Plzeň
- Coached by: Jan Hanzl

Achievements and titles
- Personal best: 400 m: 51.25 (Tábor 2023)
Medal record
Women's athletics
Representing the Czech Republic
World Championships
Bronze medal – third place	2023 Budapest	4×400 m mixed
European Games
Gold medal – first place	2023 Kraków-Małopolska	4×400 m mixed
Silver medal – second place	2019 Minsk	4×400 m relay
European Indoor Championships
Bronze medal – third place	2025 Apeldoorn	4x400 m relay
European Team Championships
Gold medal – first place	2023 Chorzów	4x400 m mixed

Tereza Petržilková (born 10 September 1993) is a Czech athlete. She competed in the mixed 4 × 400 metres relay event at the 2019 World Athletics Championships. In 2023, she was a member of the mixed 4 × 400 metres relay team that won a bronze medal at the 2023 World Athletics Championships.

== Achievements ==
Information from her World Athletics profile unless otherwise noted.

=== Personal bests ===
- 300 metres — 36.79 (Domažlice 2023)
  - 300 metres indoor — 37.20 (Prague 2023)
- 400 metres — 51.25 (Tábor 2023)
  - 400 metres indoor — 52.14 (Istanbul 2023)

=== International competitions ===
Year	Competition	Venue	Position	Event	Time	Notes
Representing the Czech Republic
2017	European Team Championships Super League	Lille, France	10th	4 × 400 m relay	3:35.41	
2018	2018 World Indoor Championships	Birmingham, United Kingdom	7th (h)	4 × 400 m relay	3:34.90	SB
2019	European Games	Minsk, Belarus	2nd	4 × 400 m relay mixed	3:17.53	
2019	European Team Championships Super League	Bydgoszcz, Poland	9th	4 × 400 m relay	3:33.24	SB
2019	World Championships	Doha, Qatar	15th (h)	4 × 400 m relay mixed	3:18.01	
2021	European Indoor Championships	Toruń, Poland	28th (h)	400 m	53.46	
2021	European Team Championships First League	Cluj-Napoca, Romania	3rd	4 × 400 m relay	3:30.51	
2022	World Indoor Championships	Belgrade, Serbia	21st (h)	400 m	53.05	
2022	European Championships	Munich, Germany	18th (sf)	400 m	52.38	
2022	European Championships	Munich, Germany	— (h)	4 × 400 m relay	DQ	
2023	European Indoor Championships	Istanbul, Turkey	6th	400 m	52.81	
2023	European Indoor Championships	Istanbul, Turkey	4th	4 × 400 m relay	3:31.26	SB
2023	European Team Championships First Division	Chorzów, Poland	5th	400 m	51.51	PB
2023	European Team Championships First Division	Chorzów, Poland	1st	4 × 400 m relay mixed	3:12.34	CR
2023	World Championships	Budapest, Hungary	23rd (sf)	400 m	51.94	
2023	World Championships	Budapest, Hungary	3rd	4 × 400 m relay mixed	3:11.98	NR
2024	World Indoor Championships	Glasgow, United Kingdom	12th (h)	400 m	52.31	
2024	World Indoor Championships	Glasgow, United Kingdom	7th (h)	4 × 400 m relay	3:28.57	
2024	European Championships	Rome, Italy	14th (sf)	400 m	52.05	
2024	European Championships	Rome, Italy	— (h)	4 × 400 m relay	DQ	
2024	Olympic Games	Paris, France	15th (rep)	400 m	51.46	
2025	European Indoor Championships	Apeldoorn, Netherlands	3rd	4 × 400 m relay	3:25.31	
2026	European Championships	Birmingham, United Kingdom	11th (h)	4 × 400 m relay	3:29.47	

=== National titles ===
- Czech Athletics Championships (5)
  - 4 × 400 m relay: 2017, 2019, 2020, 2021, 2023
- Czech Indoor Athletics Championships (2)
  - 400 metres: 2023
  - 4 × 400 m relay: 2023

== See also ==
- List of Czech records in athletics
