= Matěj Krsek =

Czech sprinter (born 2000)

Personal information
- Nationality: Czech
- Born: 13 May 2000 (age 26) Prague, Czech Republic
- Height: 185 cm (6 ft 1 in)
- Weight: 81 kg (179 lb)

Sport
- Country: Czech Republic
- Sport: Athletics
- Event: 400 m
- Club: A. C. TEPO Kladno
- Coached by: Miroslav Zahořák

Achievements and titles
- Personal bests: 400 m: 45.53 (Paris, 2024)
Medal record
Men's athletics
Representing the Czech Republic
World Championships
Bronze medal – third place	2023 Budapest	4 × 400 m mixed
European Games
Gold medal – first place	2023 Kraków-Małopolska	4 × 400 m mixed
European U20 Championships
Silver medal – second place	2019 Borås	4 × 400 m relay
European Youth Olympic Festival
Silver medal – second place	2015 Tbilisi	200 m

Matěj Krsek (born 13 May 2000) is a Czech sprinter specialising in the 400 metres. He was a bronze medalist in the 4 × 400 metres mixed relay at the 2023 World Athletics Championships in Budapest. Ever since 2020, he has been the national champion in the 400 metres, earning the title four times consecutively.

== Biography ==
Krsek was born on 13 May 2000 in Prague, Czech Republic.

== Career ==
=== 2015–2016 ===
Krsek made his international debut at the 2015 European Youth Olympic Festival in Tbilisi, Georgia. He finished in second place and won the silver medal in the 200 metres. The following year, he would return to Tbilisi for the 2016 European U18 Championships where he finished in seventh place in the 200 metres again.

=== 2021–2022 ===
He was an unused member of the Czech relay team at the delayed 2020 Olympic Games in Tokyo in 2021. The following year, he lowered his 400 m personal best to 45.55 seconds to win the Czech national title.

=== 2023 ===
In March 2023, he finished fifth in the final of the 400 metres at the 2023 European Athletics Indoor Championships in Istanbul.

He was part of the Czech team that won the bronze medal in the 4 × 400 metres mixed relay at the 2023 World Athletics Championships in Budapest in a new national record time of 3:11.98.

=== 2024 ===
Selected for the 2024 World Athletics Indoor Championships in Glasgow, he reached the final of the men's 400 meters where he finished in sixth place. He ran as part of the Czech 4 × 400 m relay team at the 2024 World Relays Championships in Nassau, Bahamas. He competed at the 2024 Summer Olympics over 400 metres in August 2024.

=== 2025-present ===
He was selected for the 2025 European Athletics Indoor Championships in Appeldoorn. He was selected for the 2025 World Athletics Indoor Championships in Nanjing in March 2025.

He was selected for the 400 metres at the 2025 European Athletics Team Championships in Madrid in June 2025, running 46.01 seconds to finish twelfth in the first division.

In August 2026, he competed in the men's 4 × 400 metres relay at the 2026 European Athletics Championships in Birmingham, England.

== Achievements ==
Information from his World Athletics profile unless otherwise noted.

=== Personal bests ===
- 200 metres — 20.94 (Kladno 2020)
  - 200 metres indoor – 21.54 (Leipzig 2019)
- 300 metres — 32.89 (Turnov 2022)
  - 300 metres indoor — (Prague 2023)
- 400 metres — 45.53 (Paris 2024)
  - 400 metres indoor – 46.03 (Istanbul 2023)

=== International competitions ===
Year	Competition	Venue	Position	Event	Time	Notes
Representing the Czech Republic
2015	European Youth Olympic Festival	Tbilisi, Georgia	2nd	200 m	21.90	
2016	European U18 Championships	Tbilisi, Georgia	7th	200 m	21.69	
2018	World U20 Championships	Tampere, Finland	9th (sf)	400 m	46.59	NU20R
2018	World U20 Championships	Tampere, Finland	5th	4 × 100 m relay	39.75	SB
2019	European U20 Championships	Borås, Sweden	4th	400 m	46.37	
2019	European U20 Championships	Borås, Sweden	—	4 × 100 m relay	DQ	
2019	European U20 Championships	Borås, Sweden	2nd	4 × 400 m relay	3:08.50	NU20R
2021	World Relays	Chorzów, Poland	10th (h)	4 × 400 m relay	3:09.79	SB
2021	European U23 Championships	Tallinn, Estonia	19th (sf)	400 m	47.18	
2021	European U23 Championships	Tallinn, Estonia	11th (h)	4 × 400 m relay	3:09.79	
2022	World Championships	Eugene, OR, United States	8th	4 × 400 m relay	3:01.63	NR
2022	European Championships	Munich, Germany	16th (sf)	400 m	45.92	
2022	European Championships	Munich, Germany	6th	4 × 400 m relay	3:01.82	
2023	European Indoor Championships	Istanbul, Turkey	5th	400 m	46.48	
2023	European Team Championships First Division	Chorzów, Poland	9th	400 m	45.75	SB
2023	European Team Championships First Division	Chorzów, Poland	1st	4 × 400 m relay mixed	3:12.34	CR
2023	World Championships	Budapest, Hungary	36th (h)	400 m	45.99	
2023	World Championships	Budapest, Hungary	12 (h)	4 × 400 m relay	3:00.99	NR
2023	World Championships	Budapest, Hungary	3rd	4 × 400 m relay mixed	3:11.98	NR
2024	World Indoor Championships	Glasgow, United Kingdom	6th	400 m	46.47	
2024	World Indoor Championships	Glasgow, United Kingdom	–	4 × 400 m relay	DNF	
2024	European Championships	Rome, Italy	21st (h)	400 m	46.69	
2024	Olympic Games	Paris, France	11th (rep)	400 m	45.53	
2025	World Indoor Championships	Nanjing, China	12th (h)	400 m	46.76	
2026	European Championships	Birmingham, United Kingdom	14th (h)	4 × 400 m relay	3:03.72	

=== National titles ===
- Czech Athletics Championships (4)
  - 400 metres: 2020, 2021, 2022, 2023
- Czech Indoor Athletics Championships
  - 400 metres: 2023

== See also ==
- List of Czech records in athletics
