= Joe Brier =

British sprinter

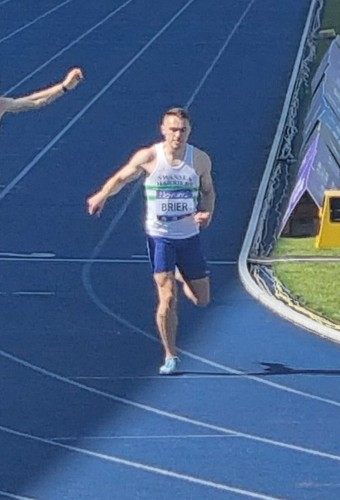
- 2025 UK Athletics Championships

Personal information
- Nickname: Joey
- Nationality: British
- Born: Joseph Brier; 16 March 1999 (age 27)

Sport
- Country: Great Britain
- Sport: Athletics
- Event: 400 metres
- College team: Cardiff Metropolitan University
- Club: Swansea Harriers

Achievements and titles
- Personal best: 400 m: 46.38 (2020)
Medal record
Men's athletics
Representing Great Britain
World Championships
Silver medal – second place	2023 Budapest	4×400 m mixed
European Championships
Gold medal – first place	2022 Munich	4×400 m relay
European Indoor Championships
Bronze medal – third place	2021 Toruń	4×400 m relay
European U23 Championships
Silver medal – second place	2019 Gävle	4×400 m relay
World U20 Championships
Bronze medal – third place	2018 Tampere	4×400 m relay

Joseph Brier (born 16 March 1999) is a Welsh track and field sprinter who specialises in the 400 metres. He has won medals with the British 4 × 400 metres relay team, including bronze at the World Athletics U20 Championships in 2018, silver at the 2019 European Athletics U23 Championships and bronze at the 2021 European Athletics Indoor Championships.

At national level, Brier won his first Welsh title in the 400 m in 2016. He placed fourth at the 2019 British Indoor Athletics Championships in his first British final. The following year he had his first national podium finish with second at the 2020 British Indoors.

His sister, Hannah Brier, is also a British sprint athlete.

== International competitions ==
Representing the United Kingdom
Year	Competition	Venue	Position	Event	Result	Notes
2018	World U20 Championships	Tampere, Finland	3rd	4 × 400 m relay	3:05.64	
2019	European Indoor Championships	Glasgow, United Kingdom	5th	4 × 400 m relay	3:08.48	
2019	European U23 Championships	Gävle, Sweden	2nd	4 × 400 m relay	3:04.59	
2021	European Indoor Championships	Toruń, Poland	3rd (h)	400 m	47.08	Ranked 19th overall
2021	European Indoor Championships	Toruń, Poland	3rd	4 × 400 m relay	3:06.70	
2021	World Relays	Chorzów, Poland	14th (h)	4 × 400 m relay	3:10.63	
2021	Olympic Games	Tokyo, Japan	14th (h)	4 × 400 m relay	3:03.29	
2022	European Championships	Munich, Germany	15th (h)	400 m	46.06	
2022	European Championships	Munich, Germany	7th (h)	4 × 400 m relay	3:02.36	
2023	European Indoor Championships	Istanbul, Turkey	4th	4 × 400 m relay	3:08.61	

== National titles ==
- Welsh Athletics Championships
  - 400 m: 2016

== See also ==
- List of European Athletics Indoor Championships medalists (men)
