= Rio Mitcham =

British athlete

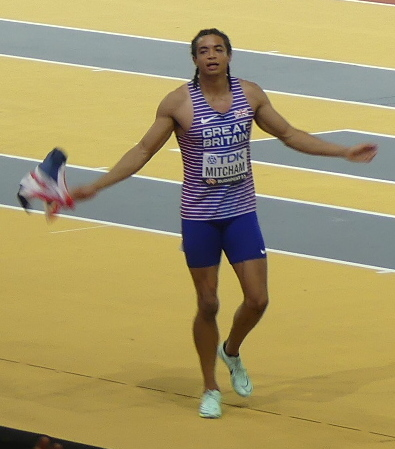
- Rio Mitcham in 2023

Personal information
- Nationality: British (English)
- Born: 30 August 1999 (age 27)

Sport
- Sport: Track and Field
- Event: 400 metres

Achievements and titles
- Personal bests: 100 m: 10.41 (Loughborough 2017); 200 m: 21.12 (Birmingham 2019); 400 m: 46.22 (Manchester 2022)
Medal record
Men's athletics
Representing Great Britain
World Championships
Silver medal – second place	2023 Budapest	4×400 m mixed
Bronze medal – third place	2023 Budapest	4×400 m relay
European Championships
Gold medal – first place	2022 Munich	4×400 m relay

Rio Mitcham (born 30 August 1999) is a British track and field athlete who competes as a sprinter. He won two medals in the 4 x 400 metres relays at the 2023 World Athletics Championships and was a gold medalist in the men's 4 x 400 metres relay at the 2022 European Athletics Championships.

== Biography ==
=== Athletics career ===
He won a silver medal at the England Athletics u23 Championship in June 2021 in the 400 metres. In July 2022 at the British Championships Mitcham ran a personal best to qualify for the final and then secured a bronze medal in the final with an improved personal best time of 46.22.

He was a member of the British relay team that ran in the 2022 European Athletics Championships – Men's 4 × 400 metres relay, winning gold in Munich.

He was selected for the 2023 World Athletics Championships in Budapest in August 2023 and competed in the mixed 4 × 400 m relay. He won a silver medal as the British team set a new national record time of 3:11.06.

He was named in the British team for the 2025 World Athletics Relays in Guangzhou. He ran in the men's 4 x 400 metres relay, alongside Charlie Dobson, Toby Harries and Efe Okoro as the British quartet finished a close second to Belgium in their heat to qualify for the final and secure a place for Britain at the 2025 World Championships.

=== Personal life ===
He was an alumnus of Loughborough University. In 2022 Mitchum competed in the eleventh series of the music reality TV show The Voice performing as Smokiecoco with his brother Alex. The brothers were successful in their initial audition, joining Will.i.am's team for the latter stages of the competition. He is from Telford.
