= Lewis Davey =

British athlete (born 2000)

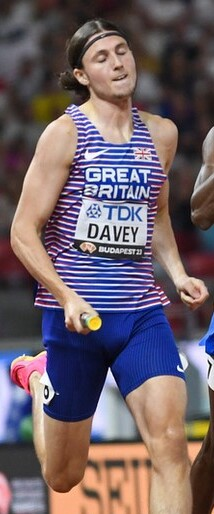
- Davey in 2023

Personal information
- Nationality: British (English)
- Born: 24 October 2000 (age 25) Grantham, Lincolnshire, England

Sport
- Sport: Track and Field
- Event: 400 metres
- Club: Newham & Essex Beagles

Achievements and titles
- Personal best: 400 m: 44.91 s (London 2025)
Medal record
Men's athletics
Representing Great Britain
Olympic Games
Bronze medal – third place	2024 Paris	4×400 m
World Championships
Silver medal – second place	2023 Budapest	4×400 m mixed
Bronze medal – third place	2023 Budapest	4×400 m relay
European Championships
Gold medal – first place	2022 Munich	4×400 m relay

Lewis Davey (born 24 October 2000) is a British athlete who competes in the 400 metres. He has won multiple medals for Great Britain in the 4 x 400 metres relay, including at the 2024 Olympic Games. He won the national 400 metres title at the 2026 British Indoor Athletics Championships.

== Early life ==
He is from Grantham in Lincolnshire. Davey attended The Priory Ruskin Academy. He competed in multi-events as a youngster and in the under-17 age group he was the county champion in 100m hurdles, 400m hurdles and long jump.

== Career ==
In 2021, Davey was a member of the British 4 × 400 m relay squad at the 2021 European Athletics U23 Championships in Tallinn, Estonia.

He was a member of the British 4x400 metres relay team that ran in the 2022 European Championships, winning gold with the team in Munich, Germany.

He was selected for the 2023 World Athletics Championships in Budapest, Hungary, in August 2023 and competed in the mixed 4 × 400 m relay. He won a silver medal as the British team set a new national record time of 3:11.06. He also won a bronze medal in the men's 4 × 400 m relay at the Championships.

In April 2024, he was selected as part of the British team for the 2024 World Athletics Relays in Nassau, Bahamas. Shortly after, he was also selected to represent Britain in the 4 × 400 m relay at the 2024 European Athletics Championships in Rome, Italy. He was part of the men's 4 × 400 m relay team which won their heat to qualify for the final. In July, Davey was named in the Great Britain 4x400 metres relay squad for the 2024 Summer Olympics. In Paris, he ran in the final of the men's 4 × 400 m relay, winning a bronze medal at the Games.

In 2025, he was named in the British team for the 2025 World Athletics Relays in Guangzhou, China. He ran a personal best 44.91 seconds for the 400 metres at the 2025 London Athletics Meet on 19 July 2025.

On 3 August, he finished second in the final of the 400 metres at the 2025 UK Athletics Championships in Birmingham, running 45.61 seconds. He was selected for the British relay pool at the 2025 World Athletics Championships in Tokyo, Japan, finishing fifth with the British team in the mixed 4 × 400 metres relay. He also ran at the championships in the final of the men's 4 x 400 metres relay as the British team placed sixth overall.

Davey ran 46.45 seconds in the final to win the 400 metres at the 2026 British Indoor Athletics Championships in Birmingham on 15 February 2026. In May, he ran at the 2026 World Athletics Relays in the men's 4 × 400 metres relay in Gaborone, Botswana.
