= Manuel Sanders =

German sprinter (born 1998)

Personal information
- Nationality: German
- Born: 3 April 1998 (age 28)

Sport
- Sport: Athletics
- Event: Sprinting
Medal record
Men's athletics
Representing Germany
European Championships
Bronze medal – third place	2024 Rome	4 × 400 m relay

Manuel Sanders (born 3 April 1998) is a German athlete who competes as a sprinter. He competed in the mixed 4 × 400 metres relay event at the 2019 World Athletics Championships.

== Personal bests ==
Outdoor

- 200 metres – 21.70 (+0.8 m/s, Rhede 2018)
- 400 metres – 45.07 (Kassel 2023)
- 600 metres – 1:16.60 (Dortmund 2023)

Indoor

- 400 metres – 47.10 (Leipzig 2022)
