= Portugal at the 2024 European Athletics Championships =

- Flag of Portugal
- WA code: POR

in Rome, Italy 7 June 2024 – 12 June 2022
- Competitors: 50 (24 men and 26 women)
- Medals Ranked 21st: Gold 0 Silver 1 Bronze 2 Total 3

European Athletics Championships appearances
- 1934; 1938; 1946; 1950; 1954; 1958; 1962; 1966; 1969; 1971; 1974; 1978; 1982; 1986; 1990; 1994; 1998; 2002; 2006; 2010; 2012; 2014; 2016; 2018; 2022; 2024

Athletes from Portugal competed at the 2024 European Athletics Championships in the Stadio Olimpico in Rome, Italy from 7 to 12 June 2024.

== Medallists ==
Medal	Name	Event	Date
Silver	Pedro Pichardo	Men's triple jump	11 June
Bronze	Liliana Cá	Women's discus throw	8 June
Bronze	Agate de Sousa	Women's long jump	12 June

== Results ==
Portugal entered the following athletes.

Key

- Q = Qualified for the next round
- q = Qualified for the next round as a fastest loser or, in field events, by position without achieving the qualifying target
- DNS = Did not start
- DNF = Did not finish
- — = Round not applicable for the event
- CR = Championship record
- EM35R = European masters over-35 record
- PB = Personal best
- WL = World leading result
- EL = European leading result
- EU23L = European under-23 leading result
- SB = Season best

=== Men ===
Track and road events

Athlete	Event	Heat		Semifinal		Final	
Athlete	Event	Result	Rank	Result	Rank	Result	Rank
Carlos Nascimento	100 metres	10.35 SB	13 q	10.43	20	Did not advance	
João Coelho	400 metres	Bye		45.36 SB	9	Did not advance	
Omar Elkhatib	400 metres	45.80	11 q	45.65	16	Did not advance	
Isaac Nader	1500 metres	3:38.83	6 Q	—N/a		3:34.22	10
Samuel Barata	10,000 metres	—N/a				DNS	
Samuel Barata	Half marathon	—N/a				DNF	
Miguel Borges	Half marathon	—N/a				1:05:16	41
Hélio Gomes	Half marathon	—N/a				DNF	
Rui Pinto	Half marathon	—N/a				1:04:55	38
Samuel Barata; Miguel Borges; Hélio Gomes; Rui Pinto	Half marathon team	—N/a				DNF	
Mikael Antonio de Jesus	400 metres hurdles	49.41	6 q	49.72	18	Did not advance	
Etson Barros	3000 metres steeplechase	8:55.33	14	—N/a		Did not advance	
Carlos Nascimento; André Prazeres; Delvis Santos; Gabriel Maia	4 × 100 metres relay	39.26 SB	12	—N/a		Did not advance	
Ricardo dos Santos; Ericsson Tavares; João Coelho; Omar Elkhatib	4 × 400 metres relay	3:01.91 NR	6 q	—N/a		3:01.89 NR	6

Field events

Athlete	Event	Qualification		Final	
Athlete	Event	Distance	Position	Distance	Position
Pedro Buaró	Pole vault	5.45	14	Did not advance	
Gerson Baldé	Long jump	8.10	5 Q	NM	
Tiago Pereira	Triple jump	16.83	4 Q	17.08 =SB	4
Pedro Pichardo	Triple jump	17.48	2 Q	18.04 NR	2nd place, silver medalist(s)
Tsanko Arnaudov	Shot put	19.42	15	Did not advance	
Francisco Belo	Shot put	20.18	8 q	19.74	10
Emanuel Sousa	Discus throw	58.72	27	Did not advance	
Leandro Ramos	Javelin throw	79.17	15	Did not advance	

=== Women ===
Track and road events

Athlete	Event	Heat		Semifinal		Final	
Athlete	Event	Result	Rank	Result	Rank	Result	Rank
Lorène Dorcas Bazolo	100 metres	11.35	12 q	11.32	17	Did not advance	
Arialis Gandulla	100 metres	11.65 SB	21	Did not advance			
Rosalina Santos	100 metres	11.62	19	Did not advance			
Lorène Dorcas Bazolo	200 metres	23.18 SB	8 q	23.39	21	Did not advance	
Cátia Azevedo	400 metres	52.53	14	Did not advance			
Patricia Silva	800 metres	2:05.03	29	Did not advance			
Salomé Afonso	1500 metres	4:06.83	4 Q	—N/a		4:06.80	8
Mariana Machado	5000 metres	—N/a				DNF	
Joana Vanessa Carvalho	Half marathon	—N/a				1:14:26	51
Solange Jesus	Half marathon	—N/a				1:12:03 PB	28
Salomé Rocha	Half marathon	—N/a				1:11:42 PB	24
Susana Santos	Half marathon	—N/a				1:13:31	44
Joana Vanessa Carvalho; Solange Jesus; Salomé Rocha; Susana Santos	Half marathon team	—N/a				3:37:16	7
Vera Barbosa	400 metres hurdles	56.81	17	Did not advance			
Fatoumata Binta Diallo	400 metres hurdles	55.81	7 q	54.65 NR	7 q	55.65	8
Carolina Costa	20 kilometres walk	—N/a				1:37:01	23
Inês Mendes	20 kilometres walk	—N/a				1:37:23	25
Vitória Oliveira	20 kilometres walk	—N/a				1:33:39	17
Lorène Dorcas Bazolo; Rosalina Santos; Lurdes Oliveira; Íris Silva	4 × 100 metres relay	43.85 NR	13	—N/a		Did not advance	
Carina Vanessa; Cátia Azevedo; Sofia Lavreshina; Vera Barbosa	4 × 400 metres relay	3:29.50 SB	13	—N/a		Did not advance	

Field events

Athlete	Event	Qualification		Final	
Athlete	Event	Distance	Position	Distance	Position
Agate de Sousa	Long jump	6.72	4 Q	6.91 SB	3rd place, bronze medalist(s)
Evelise Veiga	Long jump	NM		Did not advance	
Eliana Bandeira	Shot put	16.76	15	Did not advance	
Jessica Inchude	Shot put	18.17	5 Q	17.81	9
Liliana Cá	Discus throw	64.72 SB	3 Q	64.53	3rd place, bronze medalist(s)
Irina Rodrigues	Discus throw	61.32	7 q	62.76	4
