= Portugal at the 2026 European Athletics Championships =

- Flag of Portugal
- WA code: POR

in Birmingham, United Kingdom 10–16 August 2026
- Competitors: 55 (29 men and 26 women)
- Medals: Gold 0 Silver 1 Bronze 2 Total 3

European Athletics Championships appearances
- 1934; 1938; 1946; 1950; 1954; 1958; 1962; 1966; 1969; 1971; 1974; 1978; 1982; 1986; 1990; 1994; 1998; 2002; 2006; 2010; 2012; 2014; 2016; 2018; 2022; 2024; 2026

Portugal competed at the 2026 European Athletics Championships in Birmingham, United Kingdom from 10–16 August 2026.

== Medallists ==
Medal	Name	Event	Date
Silver	Pedro Pichardo	Men's triple jump	16 August
Bronze	Fatoumata Binta Diallo	Women's 400 metres hurdles	12 August
Bronze	Patricia Silva	Women's 1500 metres	15 August

== Results ==
Portugal entered the following athletes.

Key

- Q = Qualified for the next round
- q = Qualified for the next round as a fastest loser or, in field events, by position without achieving the qualifying target
- NR = National record
- PB = Personal best
- SB = Season best
- N/A = Round not applicable for the event

=== Men ===
Track and road events

Athlete	Event	Heat		Semifinal		Final	
Athlete	Event	Result	Rank	Result	Rank	Result	Rank
Delvis Santos	100 m	10.54	10 q	Withdrew			
Delvis Santos	200 m	20.70	5 q	20.23 PB	3 q	20.55	6
João Coelho	400 m	46.06	13	Did not advance			
Omar Elkhatib	400 m	45.49	2 q	45.22 PB	5	Did not advance	
Ericsson Tavares	400 m	45.92	11 q	45.63 =PB	6	Did not advance	
Isaac Nader	1500 m	3:35.67	2 Q	—N/a			
Nuno Pereira	1500 m	3:43.74	13	—N/a		Did not advance	
José Carlos Pinto	1500 m	3:42.11	7	—N/a		Did not advance	
José Carlos Pinto	5000 m	—N/a				DNF	
Carlos Costa	Marathon	—N/a					
Edson Gomes	110 m hurdles	DQ		Did not advance			
Diogo Barrigana	400 m hurdles	49.77	11 q	50.01	6	Did not advance	
Mikael Antonio de Jesús	400 m hurdles	50.20 SB	15	Did not advance			
Leandro Monteiro	3000 m steeplechase	8:45.79	11	—N/a		Did not advance	
Lourenço Rodrigues	3000 m steeplechase	8:54.62	13	—N/a		Did not advance	
Eduardo Camarate	Half marathon walk	—N/a				1:30:12 PB	19
Tiago Ramos	Half marathon walk	—N/a				1:32:28 PB	22
João Vieira	Half marathon walk	—N/a				DNF	
André Prazeres; Gabriel Maia; Delvis Santos; Gerson Baldé	4 × 100 m relay	39.49	6	—N/a		Did not advance	
Pedro Afonso; Ericsson Tavares; João Coelho; Omar Elkhatib	4 × 400 m relay	3:02.84	7	—N/a		Did not advance	

Field events

Athlete	Event	Qualification		Final	
Athlete	Event	Distance	Position	Distance	Position
Pedro Buaró	Pole vault	5.60	7 q		
Gerson Baldé	Long jump	7.99	9 q	8.18	4
Tiago Pereira	Triple jump	15.95 SB	14	Did not advance	
Pedro Pichardo	Triple jump	17.16	1 Q		
Tsanko Arnaudov	Shot put	18.95	17	Did not advance	
Emanuel Sousa	Discus throw	58.01	19	Did not advance	

=== Women ===
Track and road events

Athlete	Event	Heat		Semifinal		Final	
Athlete	Event	Result	Rank	Result	Rank	Result	Rank
Arialis Gandulla	100 m	11.18	6 q	11.34	7	Did not advance	
Tatjana Pinto	100 m	Bye		11.28	6	Did not advance	
Carina Vanessa	400 m	54.20	18	Did not advance			
Salomé Afonso	1500 m			—N/a			
Patricia Silva	1500 m			—N/a			
Mariana Machado	10,000 m	—N/a					
Joana Vanessa Carvalho	Marathon	—N/a					
Sara Duarte	Marathon	—N/a					
Mónica Silva	Marathon	—N/a					
Fatoumata Binta Diallo	400 m hurdles	Bye		54.34	2 Q	53.55 NR	3rd place, bronze medalist(s)
Sofia Lavreshina	400 m hurdles	Bye		54.79	4	Did not advance	
Laura Taborda	3000 m steeplechase	9:37.96 SB	9	—N/a		Did not advance	
Vitória Oliveira	Half marathon race walk	—N/a					
Joana Pontes	Marathon race walk	—N/a					
Lorène Bazolo; Beatriz Castelhano; Arialis Gandulla; Catarina Lourenço; Tatjana Pinto; Rosalina Santos	4 × 100 m relay			—N/a			
Carina Vanessa; Sofia Lavreshina; Clara Martinha; Fatoumata Binta Diallo	4 × 400 m relay	3:31.24 SB	7	—N/a		Did not advance	

Field events

Athlete	Event	Qualification		Final	
Athlete	Event	Distance	Position	Distance	Position
Agate de Sousa	Long jump				
Eliana Bandeira	Shot put	17.62	12 q	17.20	12
Auriol Dongmo	Shot put	18.76	3 Q	19.05	5
Jessica Inchude	Shot put	18.57	6 Q	18.57	6
Liliana Cá	Discus throw	61.86	5 q		
Irina Rodrigues	Discus throw	57.46	16	Did not advance	

Combined events – Heptathlon

Athlete	Event	100H	HJ	SP	200 m	LJ	JT	800 m	Final	Rank
Jéssica Barreira	Result	13.09	1.65							
Jéssica Barreira	Points	1111	795							

=== Mixed ===
Track and road events

Athlete	Event	Final	
Athlete	Event	Result	Rank
Lorène Bazolo; Beatriz Castelhano; Arialis Gandulla; David Landim; Gabriel Maia; Tatjana Pinto; André Prazeres; Delvis Santos	Mixed 4 × 100 m		
