= 2024 World Athletics Relays – Mixed 4 × 400 metres relay =

Mixed 4 × 400 metres relay at the 2024 World Athletics Relays
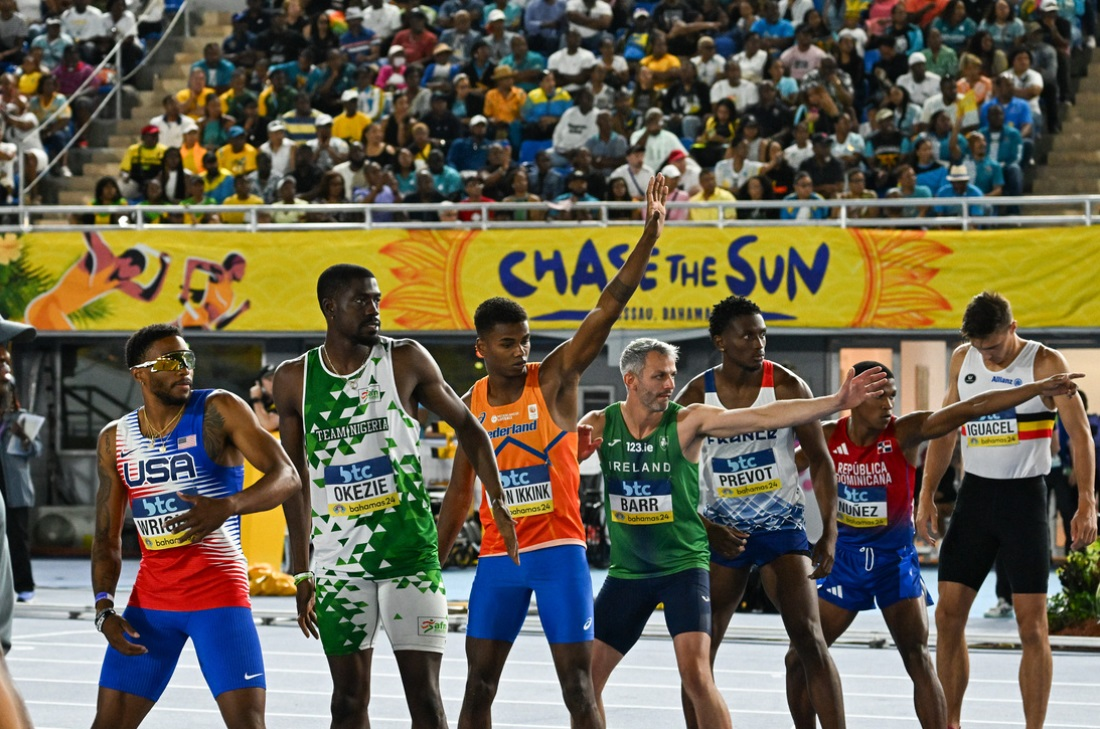
- The third-leg runners of the seven nations participating in the final waiting to receive the batons
- Venue: Thomas Robinson Stadium
- Location: Nassau, The Bahamas
- Dates: 4 May 2024 (round 1); 5 May 2024 (repechage round & final)
- Nations: 30
- Winning time: 3:10.73 min CR

Medalists
gold medal	Matthew Boling; Lynna Irby-Jackson; Wilington Wright (final only); Kendall Ellis; Ryan Willie (round 1 only)	United States
silver medal	Isayah Boers; Lieke Klaver; Isaya Klein Ikkink; Femke Bol	Netherlands
bronze medal	Cillin Greene; Rhasidat Adeleke; Thomas Barr; Sharlene Mawdsley	Ireland

The mixed 4 × 400 metres relay at the 2024 World Athletics Relays took place in three rounds at the Thomas Robinson Stadium in Nassau, The Bahamas, on 4 and 5 May 2024. It was the fourth time that this mixed-sex relay was contested at the World Athletics Relays. The event was also an Olympic qualification: fourteen teams qualified for the mixed 4 × 400 metres relay at the 2024 Summer Olympics in Paris, France.

On 4 May, thirty national teams competed in round 1, where eight teams qualified for the finals and the Summer Olympics, and the rest advanced to a repechage round on 5 May, where another six teams qualified for the Summer Olympics. In round 1, the team of the Netherlands set a championship record of 3:12.16 minutes, which was improved by the team of the United States to 3:11.52 minutes shortly after, and the team of Ireland set a national record of 3:12.50 minutes. In the repechage round, national records were set by the teams of The Bahamas, Switzerland, and Canada in of 3:12.81 minutes, 3:14.12 minutes, and 3:14.66 minutes respectively.

On 5 May, seven teams competed in the final, which was won by the team of the United States in a championship record of 3:10.73 minutes, followed by the teams of the Netherlands in 3:11.45 minutes and Ireland in a national record of 3:11.53 minutes. Outside the medals, the team of Nigeria set an African record of 3:12.87 minutes.

== Background ==
At the World Athletics Relays, the mixed 4 × 400 metres relay was introduced at the 2017 edition in Nassau, The Bahamas, and had been contested three times before 2024. The 2024 edition was held on the 400-metres track of the Thomas Robinson Stadium in Nassau. For these mixed-sex races, each of the four team members was to run one lap in the mandated running order man–woman–man–woman.

At the start of the 2024 edition, the world record was 3:08.80 min set by the team of the United States in 2023, the championship record was 3:14.42 min set by the Bahamian team in 2017, and the world leading time was 3:13.26 min set by the Ghanaian team on 19 March 2024. The Italian team was the previous winner after their victory in this event in 2021.

Records before the 2024 World Athletics Relays
Record	Nation	Time	Location	Date
World record	United States	3:08.80	Budapest, Hungary	19 August 2023
Championship record	Bahamas	3:14.42	Nassau, The Bahamas	23 April 2017
World leading	Nigeria	3:13.26	Accra, Ghana	19 March 2024
African record	Nigeria	3:13.26	Accra, Ghana	19 March 2024
Asian record	Bahrain	3:11.82	Doha, Qatar	29 September 2019
North, Central American and Caribbean record	United States	3:08.80	Budapest, Hungary	19 August 2023
South American record	Colombia	3:14.48	Mexico City, Mexico	7 April 2024
European record	Poland	3:09.87	Tokyo, Japan	31 July 2021
Oceanian record	Australia	3:17.00	Gold Coast, Australia	12 June 2021

== Rounds ==
=== Round 1 ===
On 4 May 2024, round 1 was held in four heats, starting at 19:05 (UTC−4). The first two relay teams of each heat qualified for the final (Q) and simultaneously qualified for the mixed 4 × 400 metres relay at the 2024 Summer Olympics in Paris, France (*OQ). The other teams advanced into a repechage round, where they got another chance for Olympic qualification.

In the first heat, the Dutch and the Dominican team qualified for the final and the Olympics, and the Dutch set a new championship record of 3:12.16 min. In the second heat, the American and the Nigerian team qualified for the final and the Olympics, where the Americans broke the championship record again in a time of 3:11.52 min; the Bahraini team did not finish (DNF), because their third runner didn't complete his lap. In the third heat, the Irish and the Belgian team qualified for the final and the Olympics, where the Irish set a new national record (NR) of 3:12.50 min. In the fourth heat, the Polish and French team qualified for the final and the Olympics; the Mexican team was disqualified (DQ) for a fault at recovering a dropped baton (TR24.6).

Results of round 1
Rank	Heat	Nation	Athletes	Time	Notes
1	2	United States	Matthew Boling, Lynna Irby-Jackson, Ryan Willie, Kendall Ellis	3:11.52	Q, *OQ, CR
2	1	Netherlands	Isayah Boers, Lieke Klaver, Isaya Klein Ikkink, Femke Bol	3:12.16	Q, *OQ, CR
3	3	Ireland	Cillin Greene, Rhasidat Adeleke, Thomas Barr, Sharlene Mawdsley	3:12.50	Q, *OQ, NR
4	3	Belgium	Jonathan Sacoor, Imke Vervaet, Christian Iguacel, Camille Laus	3:13.18	Q, *OQ, SB
5	3	(United Kingdom) Great Britain & N.I.	Brodie Young, Ama Pipi, Charles Dobson, Laviai Nielsen	3:13.52	SB
6	4	Poland	Maksymilian Szwed, Iga Baumgart-Witan, Kajetan Duszynski, Natalia Kaczmarek	3:13.53	Q, *OQ, SB
7	2	Nigeria	Samuel Ogazi, Ella Onojuvwevwo, Chidi Okezie, Esther Elo Joseph	3:13.79	Q, *OQ
8	1	Dominican Republic	Alexander Ogando, Anabel Medina, Yeral Nuñez, Marileidy Paulino	3:14.39	Q, *OQ, SB
9	3	Switzerland	Ricky Petrucciani, Giulia Senn, Lionel Spitz, Annina Fahr	3:14.47	
10	4	France	Thomas Jordier, Amandine Brossier, Gilles Biron, Louise Maraval	3:14.71	Q, *OQ, SB
11	1	Jamaica	Roshawn Clarke, Leah Anderson, Rusheen McDonald, Janieve Russell	3:14.83	SB
12	1	Bahamas	Alonzo Russell, Shaunae Miller-Uibo, Steven Gardiner, Shania Adderley	3:14.86	SB
13	3	Spain	David García, Bianca Hervas, Julio Arenas, Carmen Avilés	3:15.47	SB
14	4	Ukraine	Oleksandr Pohorilko, Tetyana Melnyk, Danylo Danylenko, Anna Ryzhykova	3:15.70	SB
15	2	South Africa	Mhti Mthimkulu, Shirley Nekhubui, Antonie Matthys Nortje, Zenéy Geldenhuys	3:15.95	
16	4	Czech Republic	Vit Müller, Tereza Petržilková, Patrik Šorm, Lada Vondrová	3:16.56	SB
17	4	Canada	Tyler Floyd, Lauren Gale, Callum Robinson, Madeline Price	3:16.65	SB
18	1	Germany	Marvin Schlegel, Alica Schmidt, Jean Paul Bredau, Johanna Martin	3:16.74	SB
19	2	Hungary	Attila Molnár, Sára Mátó, Patrik Simon Enyingi, Janka Molnár	3:16.80	SB
20	2	Italy	Lapo Bianciardi, Alessandra Bonora, Riccardo Meli, Anna Polinari	3:16.88	SB
21	3	Guyana	Malachi Austin, Aliyah Abrams, Daniel Williams, Tianna Springer	3:17.31	SB
22	3	Portugal	João Coelho, Fatoumata Diallo, Ricardo dos Santos, Cátia Azevedo	3:17.56	SB
23	4	Botswana	Busang Collen Kebinatshipi, Lydia Jele, Anthony Pesela, Obakeng Kamberuka	3:18:48	
24	3	Kenya	Kennedy Kimeu Muthoki, Mercy Chebet, Kevin Kipkorir, Maureen Nyatichi Thomas	3:19.90	
25	2	India	Rajesh Ramesh, Rupal, Avinash Krishna Kumar, Jyothika Sri Dandi	3:20.36	
26	4	Japan	Takuho Yoshizu, Nanako Matsumoto, Kenki Imaizumi, Yuna Iwata	3:20.92	SB
27	1	Colombia	Jhon Perlaza, Jennifer Padilla, Nicolás Salinas, Lina Licona	3:21.07	
28	1	Brazil	Tiago Lemes Da Silva, Gabriele Aline Grunow, Douglas Hernandes Mendes, Tabata Vitorino	3:28.01	SB
	2	Bahrain	Musa Isah, Kemi Adekoya, Abbas Yusuf Ali, Salwa Eid Naser	DNF	
	4	Mexico	Valente Mendoza, Mariana Gancedo Ontaneda, Luis Avilés Ferreiro, Paola Morán	DQ	TR24.6

=== Repechage round ===
On 5 May 2024, the three heats of the repechage round for the Olympic qualification were held, starting at 19:05 (UTC−4). Six relay teams, the first two teams of each heat, qualified for the mixed 4 × 400 metres relay at the 2024 Paris Olympics (*OQ).

In the first heat, the Bahamanian and the Jamaican team qualified for the Olympics, where the Bahamanians set a national record (NR) of 3:12.81 min; the Brazilian team did not start (DNS). In the second heat, the German and the Swiss team qualified for the Olympics, where the Swiss set a national record of 3:14.12 min; the Canadian team set a national record of 3:14.66 min and the Czech and the Indian team did not start. In the third heat, the British and the Ukrainian team were the last two teams to qualify for the Olympics.

Results of the repechage round
Rank	Heat	Nation	Athletes	Time	Notes
1	1	Bahamas	Steven Gardiner, Shania Adderley, Alonzo Russell, Shaunae Miller-Uibo	3:12.81	*OQ, NR,
2	3	(United Kingdom) Great Britain & N.I.	Brodie Young, Laviai Nielsen, Charles Dobson, Nicole Yeargin	3:12.99	*OQ, SB
3	2	Germany	Manuel Sanders, Alica Schmidt, Emil Agyekum, Johanna Martin	3:13.85	*OQ, SB
4	2	Switzerland	Ricky Petrucciani, Annina Fahr, Lionel Spitz, Giulia Senn	3:14.12	*OQ, NR
5	1	Jamaica	Zandrion Barnes, Leah Anderson, Rusheen McDonald, Janieve Russell	3:14.49	*OQ, SB
6	3	Ukraine	Oleksandr Pohorilko, Tetyana Melnyk, Danylo Danylenko, Anna Ryzhykova	3:14.49	*OQ, SB
7	2	Canada	Michael Roth, Lauren Gale, Callum Robinson, Madeline Price	3:14.66	NR
8	3	Spain	David García, Bianca Hervas, Julio Arenas, Berta Segura	3:15.11	SB
9	1	South Africa	Mhti Mthimkulu, Shirley Nekhubui, Lythe Pillay, Zenéy Geldenhuys	3:15.96	
10	1	Japan	Kentaro Sato, Fuka Idoabigail, Kenki Imaizumi, Yuna Iwata	3:16.02	SB
11	3	Botswana	Anthony Pesela, Obakeng Kamberuka, Boitumelo Masilo, Lydia Jele	3:16.39	
12	2	Italy	Lapo Bianciardi, Anna Polinari, Riccardo Meli, Alice Mangione	3:16.47	SB
13	3	Portugal	João Coelho, Cátia Azevedo, Omar Elkhatib, Fatoumata Diallo	3:17.03	SB
14	1	Guyana	Daniel Williams, Tianna Springer, Malachi Austin, Aliyah Abrams	3:17.65	
15	1	Bahrain	Abbas Yusuf Ali, Kemi Adekoya, Abbas Abubakar Abbas, Salwa Eid Naser	3:18.21	SB
16	2	Kenya	Kevin Kipkorir, Mercy Chebet, Brian Onyari Tinega, Maureen Nyatichi Thomas	3:18.76	
17	1	Hungary	Patrik Simon Enyingi, Sára Mátó, Attila Molnár, Janka Molnár	3:18.78	
18	3	Mexico	Luis Avilés Ferreiro, Mariana Gancedo Ontaneda, Alejandro Diaz, Paola Morán	3:19.81	
19	3	Colombia	Nicolás Salinas, Lina Licona, Jhon Perlaza, Jennifer Padilla	3:21.29	
	1	Brazil		DNS	
	2	Czech Republic		DNS	
	2	India		DNS	

=== Final ===
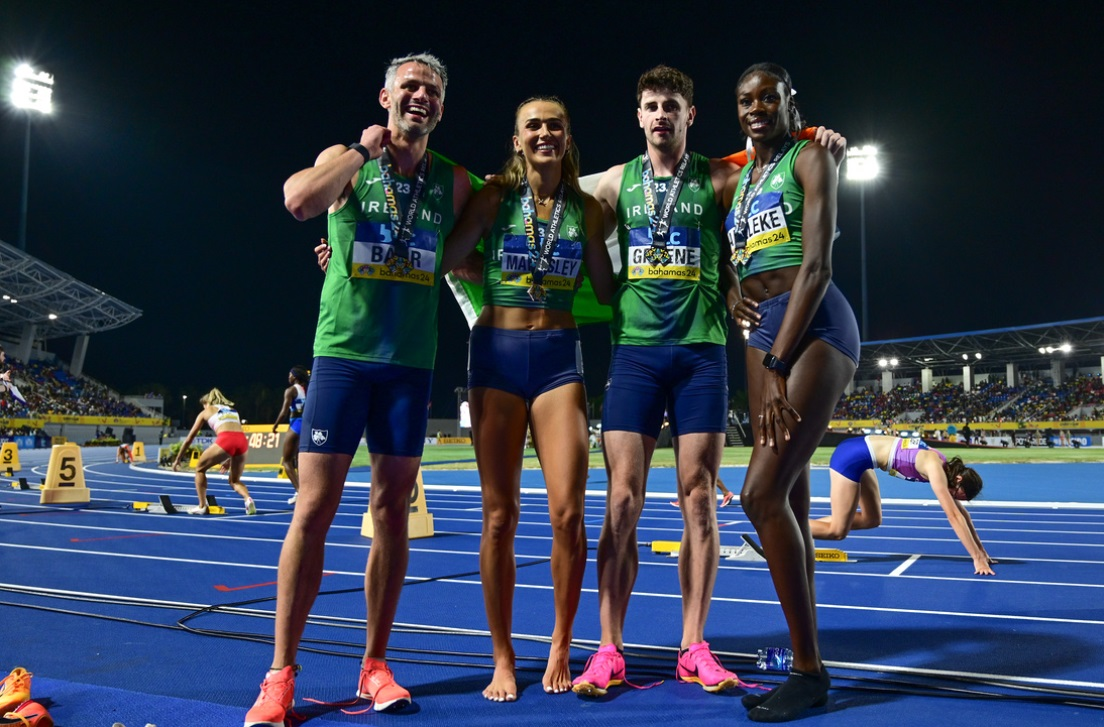
Thomas Barr, Sharlene Mawdsley, Cillin Greene, and Rhasidat Adeleke of Ireland with their bronze medals after setting a national record of 3:11.53 min in the final

On 5 May 2024, the final was held, starting at 21:40 (UTC−4). Eight teams had qualified, but only seven competed in the final race, because the Polish team did not start (DNS).

During the opening leg, Matthew Boling of the United States took the lead and was the first to hand over the baton, followed by Isayah Boers of the Netherlands, Florent Mabille of Belgium, and Cillin Greene of Ireland. During the second leg, Lynna Irby-Jackson of the United States was able to keep the Americans in the lead, while Rhasidat Adeleke of Ireland moved up from fourth to second position, Lieke Klaver of the Netherlands moved down from second to third, and Imke Vervaet of Belgium dropped to sixth position. During the third leg, the running order of the first three teams remained unchanged: Willington Wright of the United States was first to hand over the baton, Thomas Barr of Ireland second, and Isaya Klein Ikkink of the Netherlands third. During the anchor leg, Kendall Ellis of United States was able to keep her team in the lead, while Femke Bol of the Netherlands switched positions with Sharlene Mawdsley of Ireland.

The race was won by the American team in a new championship record (CR) of 3:10.73 min, followed by the Dutch team in 3:11.45 min and the Irish team in 3:11.53 min, which was a new national record (NR). First-leg runner Boling had the fastest male split time of 45.11 s and second-leg runner Adeleke had the fastest female split time of 48.45 s, which was "sensational" as the fastest female split at the World Athletics Relays ever, according to Jon Mulkeen in a report for World Athletics. Outside the medals in fourth place, the Nigerian team set a new African area record (AR) of 3:12.87 min. The Belgian team was disqualified (DQ) for a fault at recovering a dropped baton (TR24.6).

Teams of the United States also won the men's and women's 4 × 100 m relay and the women's 4 × 400 m relay at this tournament. The men's 4 × 400 m relay was not won by the Americans, who had been disqualified in round 1, but by the team of Botswana.

Results of the final
Rank	Lane	Nation	Athletes	Time	Notes
1st place, gold medalist(s)	4	United States	Matthew Boling, Lynna Irby-Jackson, Willington Wright, Kendall Ellis	3:10.73	CR
2nd place, silver medalist(s)	6	Netherlands	Isayah Boers, Lieke Klaver, Isaya Klein Ikkink, Femke Bol	3:11.45	SB
3rd place, bronze medalist(s)	7	Ireland	Cillin Greene, Rhasidat Adeleke, Thomas Barr, Sharlene Mawdsley	3:11.53	NR
4	8	Nigeria	Samuel Ogazi, Ella Onojuvwevwo, Chidi Okezie, Esther Elo Joseph	3:12.87	AR
5	1	Dominican Republic	Erik Joel Sánchez, Anabel Medina, Yeral Nuñez, Marileidy Paulino	3:16.88	
6	2	France	Yann Spillmann, Amandine Brossier, Loïc Prevot, Louise Maraval	3:17.38	
	3	Belgium	Florent Mabille, Imke Vervaet, Christian Iguacel, Camille Laus	DQ	TR24.6
	5	Poland		DNS	
