= Portugal at the 2025 World Athletics Championships =

- Flag of Portugal
- WA code: POR

in Tokyo, Japan 13 September 2025 – 21 September 2025
- Competitors: 32 (17 men and 15 women)
- Medals Ranked 9th: Gold 2 Silver 0 Bronze 0 Total 2

World Athletics Championships appearances (overview)
- 1980; 1983; 1987; 1991; 1993; 1995; 1997; 1999; 2001; 2003; 2005; 2007; 2009; 2011; 2013; 2015; 2017; 2019; 2022; 2023; 2025

Portugal competed at the 2025 World Athletics Championships in Tokyo, Japan, from 13 to 21 September 2025.

== Medallists ==
Medal	Athlete	Event	Date
Gold	Isaac Nader	Men's 1500 metres	September 17
Gold	Pedro Pichardo	Men's triple jump	September 19

== Results ==
Portugal entered 32 athletes to the championships: 15 women and 17 men.

Key

- Q = Qualified for the next round
- q = Qualified for the next round as a fastest loser or, in field events, by position without achieving the qualifying target
- NR = National record
- PB = Personal best
- SB = Season best
- N/A = Round not applicable for the event

=== Men ===
Track and road events

Athlete	Event	Heat		Semifinal		Final	
Athlete	Event	Result	Rank	Result	Rank	Result	Rank
Isaac Nader	1500 metres	3:40.91	1 Q	3:36.86	3 Q	3:34.10	1st place, gold medalist(s)
Nuno Pereira	1500 metres	3:42.63	7	Did not advance			
José Carlos Pinto	1500 metres	3:37.09	2 Q	3:36.23	9	Did not advance	
Rui Pinto	Marathon	—N/a				2:19:50	42
Etson Barros	3000 metres steeplechase	8:38.58	9	—N/a		Did not advance	
Pedro Afonso; João Coelho; Ricardo dos Santos; Omar Elkhatib; Ericsson Tavares*	4 × 400 metres relay	2:59.70 NR	5 q	—N/a		3:09.06	9
João Vieira	35 kilometres walk	—N/a				2:38:20	20

Field events

Athlete	Event	Qualification		Final	
Athlete	Event	Distance	Position	Distance	Position
Gerson Baldé	Long jump	7.93	15	Did not advance	
Tiago Luis Pereira	Triple jump	NM		Did not advance	
Pedro Pichardo	Triple jump	17.09	3 q	17.91 WL	1st place, gold medalist(s)
Tsanko Arnaudov	Shot put	19.59	23	Did not advance	
Emanuel Sousa	Discus throw	56.97	36	Did not advance	
Leandro Ramos	Javelin throw	76.65	32	Did not advance	

=== Women ===
Track and road events

Athlete	Event	Heat		Semifinal		Final	
Athlete	Event	Result	Rank	Result	Rank	Result	Rank
Lorène Dorcas Bazolo	100 metres	11.34	6	Did not advance			
Lorène Dorcas Bazolo	200 metres	23.07	6	Did not advance			
Salomé Afonso	1500 metres	4:07.44	3 Q	4:15.08	10 qJ	4:00.47	12
Mariana Machado	5000 metres	15:39.61	20	—N/a		Did not advance	
Solange Jesus	Marathon	—N/a				2:33:24	19
Susana Santos	Marathon	—N/a				2:35:06 SB	26
Fatoumata Binta Diallo	400 metres hurdles	54.54	3 Q	54.45	4 NR	Did not advance	
Vitória Oliveira	20 kilometres walk	—N/a				1:33:02	28
Joana Pontes	35 kilometres walk	—N/a				3:09:07 PB	27

Field events

Athlete	Event	Qualification		Final	
Athlete	Event	Distance	Position	Distance	Position
Agate de Sousa	Long jump	6.81	3 Q	6.67	6
Eliana Bandeira	Shot put	17.75	17	Did not advance	
Auriol Dongmo	Shot put	17.53	20	Did not advance	
Jessica Inchude	Shot put	17.69	18	Did not advance	
Liliana Cá	Discus throw	59.79	16	Did not advance	
Irina Rodrigues	Discus throw	59.23	21	Did not advance	
