= Portugal at the 2023 World Athletics Championships =

- Flag of Portugal
- WA code: POR

in Budapest, Hungary 19 August 2023 – 27 August 2023
- Competitors: 29 (11 men and 18 women)
- Medals: Gold 0 Silver 0 Bronze 0 Total 0

World Athletics Championships appearances (overview)
- 1980; 1983; 1987; 1991; 1993; 1995; 1997; 1999; 2001; 2003; 2005; 2007; 2009; 2011; 2013; 2015; 2017; 2019; 2022; 2023; 2025

Portugal competed at the 2023 World Athletics Championships in Budapest, Hungary, from 19 to 27 August 2023.

== Results ==
Portugal entered 29 athletes.

Key

- Q = Qualified for the next round
- q = Qualified for the next round as a fastest loser or, in field events, by position without achieving the qualifying target
- NR = National record
- PB = Personal best
- SB = Season best
- N/A = Round not applicable for the event

=== Men ===
Track and road events

Athlete	Event	Heat		Semifinal		Final	
Athlete	Event	Result	Rank	Result	Rank	Result	Rank
João Coelho	400 metres	45.38	6	Did not advance			
Isaac Nader	1500 metres	3:34.36	5 Q	3:35.31	5 Q	3:35.41	12
João Vieira	20 kilometres walk	—N/a				1:23:37	33
João Vieira	35 kilometres walk	—N/a				DNF	

Field events

Athlete	Event	Qualification		Final	
Athlete	Event	Distance	Position	Distance	Position
Pedro Buaró	Pole vault	5.35	=26	Did not advance	
Tiago Pereira	Triple jump	16.77 SB	9 q	16.26	11
Pedro Pichardo	Triple jump	DNS		Did not advance	
Tsanko Arnaudov	Shot put	19.17	30	Did not advance	
Francisco Belo	Shot put	19.24	27	Did not advance	
Leandro Ramos	Javelin throw	74.03	31	Did not advance	

=== Women ===
Track and road events

Athlete	Event	Heat		Semifinal		Final	
Athlete	Event	Result	Rank	Result	Rank	Result	Rank
Lorène Bazolo	100 metres	11.29	4	Did not advance			
Arialis Gandulla	100 metres	11.47	7	Did not advance			
Lorène Bazolo	200 metres	23.13	6	Did not advance			
Cátia Azevedo	400 metres	51.93	4	Did not advance			
Patricia Silva	800 metres	2:05.54	8	Did not advance			
Salomé Afonso	1500 metres	4:06.55	11	Did not advance			
Marta Pen	1500 metres	4:07.74	10	Did not advance			
Mariana Machado	5000 metres	15:28.97	14	—N/a		Did not advance	
Solange Jesus	Marathon	—N/a				2:45:08	60
Fatoumata Diallo	400 metres hurdles	56.03	7	Did not advance			
Ana Cabecinha	20 kilometres walk	—N/a				1:28:49 SB	9
Vitória Oliveira	20 kilometres walk	—N/a				1:33:04 PB	23
Inês Henriques	35 kilometres walk	—N/a				DNF	

Field events

Athlete	Event	Qualification		Final	
Athlete	Event	Distance	Position	Distance	Position
Eliana Bandeira	Shot put	17.79	21	Did not advance	
Auriol Dongmo	Shot put	19.59	2 Q	19.69	4
Jessica Inchude	Shot put	18.16	16	Did not advance	
Liliana Cá	Discus throw	63.34	7 q	63.59	8
Irina Rodrigues	Discus throw	57.08	26	Did not advance	

=== Mixed ===
Track events

Athlete	Event	Heat		Final	
Athlete	Event	Result	Rank	Result	Rank
Cátia Azevedo; Fatoumata Diallo; Ricardo dos Santos; Omar Elkhatib	4 × 400 metres relay	3:15.75	16	Did not advance	
