= 2024 European Athletics Championships – Men's 4 × 400 metres relay =

Men's 4 × 400 metres relay at the 2024 European Athletics Championships
- Venue: Stadio Olimpico
- Location: Rome
- Dates: 11 June (heats); 12 June (final)
- Winning time: 2:59.85 EL

Medalists
gold medal	Jonathan Sacoor; Robin Vanderbemden; Dylan Borlée; Alexander Doom; Florent Mabille*; Christian Iguacel*	Belgium
silver medal	Luca Sito; Vladimir Aceti; Riccardo Meli; Edoardo Scotti; Brayan Lopez*	Italy
bronze medal	Manuel Sanders; Jean Paul Bredau; Marc Koch; Emil Agyekum; Lukas Krappe*; Tyler Prenz*	Germany

The men's 4 × 400 metres relay at the 2024 European Athletics Championships took place at the Stadio Olimpico on 11 and 12 June.

== Records ==
Standing records prior to the 2024 European Athletics Championships
World record	United States (Andrew Valmon, Quincy Watts; Butch Reynolds, Michael Johnson)	2:54.29	Stuttgart, Germany	22 August 1993
European record	Great Britain (Iwan Thomas, Jamie Baulch; Mark Richardson, Roger Black)	2:56.60	Atlanta, Georgia, United States	3 August 1996
Championship record	Great Britain (Paul Sanders, Kriss Akabusi; John Regis, Roger Black)	2:58.22	Split, Yugoslavia	1 September 1990
World Leading	(United States) Arkansas (TJ Tomlyanovich, Lance Lang; Steven McElroy, James Benson)	2:59.03	Gainesville, Florida, United States	11 May 2024
Europe Leading	Belgium (Dylan Borlée, Robin Vanderbemden; Jonathan Sacoor, Alexander Doom)	3:00.09	Nassau, Bahamas	4 May 2024

== Schedule ==
Date	Time	Round
11 June 2024	10:45	Round 1
12 June 2024	21:19	Final

All times are local times (UTC+2)

== Results ==
=== Round 1 ===
Qualification: First 3 in each heat (Q) and the next 2 fastest (q) advance to the final.

Rank	Heat	Lane	Nation	Athletes	Time	Notes
1	2	4	France	David Sombé; Gilles Biron; Yann Spillmann; Téo Andant	3:00.77	Q, SB
2	2	3	Belgium	Florent Mabille; Robin Vanderbemden; Christian Iguacel; Dylan Borlée	3:01.09	Q
3	2	8	Germany	Manuel Sanders; Marc Koch; Lukas Krappe; Tyrel Prenz	3:01.44	Q
4	2	7	Spain	Iñaki Cañal; Manuel Guijarro; Óscar Husillos; David García	3:01.45	q, SB
5	1	6	Great Britain	Lewis Davey; Michael Ohioze; Toby Harries; Charlie Carvell	3:01.69	Q
6	2	6	Portugal	Omar Elkhatib; Ricardo dos Santos; João Coelho; Ericsson Tavares	3:01.91	q, NR
7	1	4	Italy	Brayan Lopez; Vladimir Aceti; Riccardo Meli; Edoardo Scotti	3:02.01	Q
8	1	8	Hungary	Ernő Steigerwald; Patrik Simon Enyingi; Zoltán Wahl; Attila Molnár	3:02.09	NR
9	1	5	Netherlands	Isayah Boers; Terrence Agard; Ramsey Angela; Isaya Klein Ikkink	3:03.50	
10	1	3	Ireland	Jack Raftery; Christopher O'Donnell; Sean Doggett; Callum Baird	3:04.41	SB
11	1	7	Ukraine	Oleksandr Pohorilko; Rostyslav Holubovych; Mykyta Rodchenkov; Danylo Danylenko	3:05.86	SB
12	1	9	Czech Republic	Michal Desenský; Patrik Šorm; Adam Smolka; Philip Krenek	3:06.70	
13	2	5	Sweden	Kasper Kadestål; Marcus Tornée; Emil Johansson; David Thid	3:07.71	SB
	1	2	Switzerland	Julien Bonvin; Charles Devantay; Ricky Petrucciani; Lionel Spitz	DQ	TR17.2.3
	2	9	Poland	Maksymilian Szwed; Karol Zalewski; Igor Bogaczyński; Kajetan Duszyński	DQ	TR17.2.3

=== Final ===
The final started on 12 June at 21:17.

Rank	Lane	Nation	Athletes	Time	Notes
1st place, gold medalist(s)	8	Belgium	Jonathan Sacoor, Robin Vanderbemden, Dylan Borlée, Alexander Doom	2:59.84	EL
2nd place, silver medalist(s)	6	Italy	Luca Sito, Vladimir Aceti, Riccardo Meli, Edoardo Scotti	3:00.81	SB
3rd place, bronze medalist(s)	4	Germany	Manuel Sanders, Jean Paul Bredau, Marc Koch, Emil Agyekum	3:00.82	SB
4	5	France	Gilles Biron, Yann Spillmann, Muhammad Abdallah Kounta, Téo Andant	3:01.43	
5	3	Spain	Iñaki Cañal, Manuel Guijarro, David García, Óscar Husillos	3:01.44	SB
6	2	Portugal	Ricardo Dos Santos, Ericsson Tavares, João Coelho, Omar Elkhatib	3:01.89	NR
7	7	Great Britain	Toby Harries, Michael Ohioze, Lewis Davey, Alex Haydock-Wilson	3:01.84	
8	9	Hungary	Ernõ Steigerwald, Patrik Simon Enyingi, Zoltán Wahl, Attila Molnár	3:02.10	
