= 2024 World Athletics Indoor Championships – Men's 4 × 400 metres relay =

Men's 4 × 400 metres at the 2024 World Athletics Indoor Championships
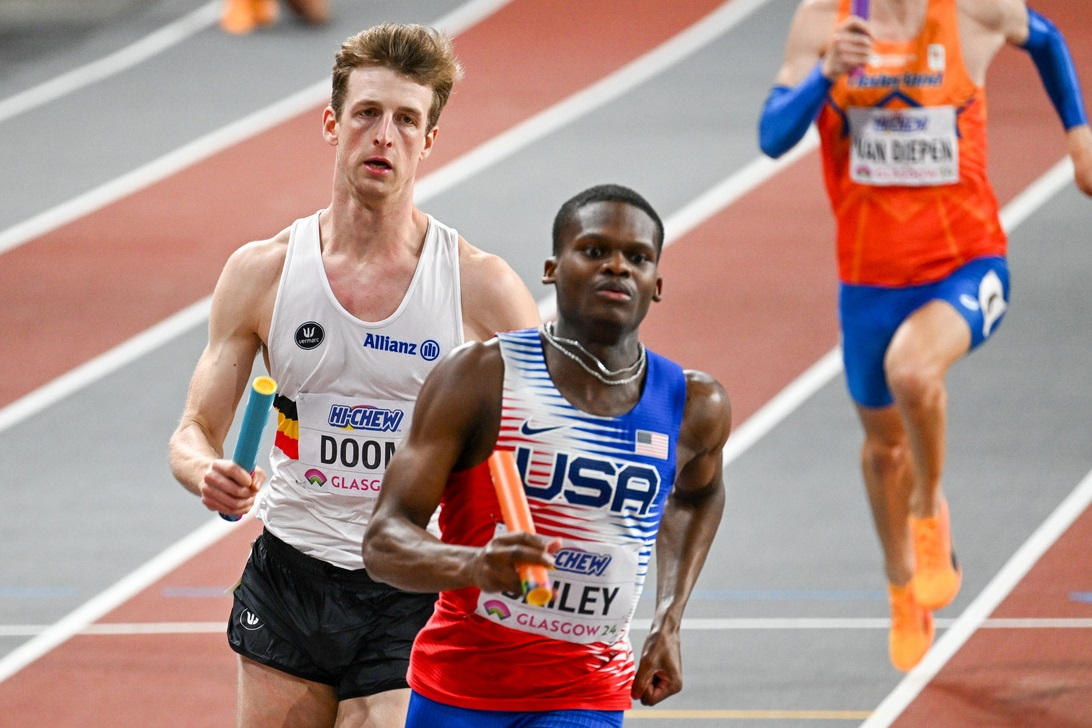
- Alexander Doom (left) shortly before he overtook Christopher Bailey (center) in the final
- Venue: Commonwealth Arena
- Dates: 3 March
- Competitors: 37 from 8 nations
- Winning time: 3:02.54 WL

Medalists
gold medal	Jonathan Sacoor; Dylan Borlée; Christian Iguacel; Alexander Doom; Tibo De Smet	Belgium
silver medal	Jacory Patterson; Matthew Boling; Noah Lyles; Christopher Bailey; Paul Dedewo; Trevor Bassitt	United States
bronze medal	Liemarvin Bonevacia; Ramsey Angela; Terrence Agard; Tony van Diepen; Taymir Burnet; Isaya Klein Ikkink	Netherlands

The men's 4 × 400 metres relay at the 2024 World Athletics Indoor Championships took place on 3 March 2024.

The winning margin was 0.06 seconds which was the first time the men's 4x400 metres was won by less than a tenth of a second at these championships.

== Results ==
=== Heats ===
Qualification: First 2 in each heat (Q) and the next 2 fastest (q) advance to the Final.

The heats were started at 11:10.

Rank	Heat	Lane	Country	Athletes	Time	Notes
1	1	6	United States	Paul Dedewo, Trevor Bassitt, Matthew Boling, Christopher Bailey	3:05.56	Q
2	1	5	Belgium	Jonathan Sacoor, Christian Iguacel, Tibo De Smet, Dylan Borlée	3:06.27	Q, SB
3	2	4	Netherlands	Taymir Burnet, Isaya Klein Ikkink, Tony van Diepen, Ramsey Angela	3:06.47	Q, SB
4	2	5	Portugal	Ericsson Tavares, Ricardo dos Santos, João Coelho, Omar Elkhatib	3:06.57	Q, NR
5	2	4	Poland	Patryk Grzegorzewicz, Maksymilian Swed, Daniel Sołtysiak, Mateusz Rzeźniczak	3:06.74	q, SB
6	1	5	Kenya	Wiseman Mukhobe, Zablon Ekwam, Kelvin Tauta, Boniface Mweresa	3:06.96	q, AR
7	1	6	Slovakia	Šimon Bujna, Patrik Dömötör, Miroslav Marček, Mário Hanic	3:09.21	NR
	2	6	Czech Republic	Vít Müller, Michal Desenský, Patrik Šorm, Matěj Krsek	DNF	

=== Final ===
The final was started at 20:15.

Rank	Lane	Country	Athletes	Time	Notes
1st place, gold medalist(s)	5	Belgium	Jonathan Sacoor, Dylan Borlée, Christian Iguacel, Alexander Doom	3:02.54	WL
2nd place, silver medalist(s)	6	United States	Jacory Patterson, Matthew Boling, Noah Lyles, Christopher Bailey	3:02.60	SB
3rd place, bronze medalist(s)	4	Netherlands	Liemarvin Bonevacia, Ramsey Angela, Terrence Agard, Tony van Diepen	3:04.25	NR
4	2	Kenya	Wiseman Mukhobe, Zablon Ekwam, Kelvin Tauta, Boniface Mweresa	3:06.71	AR
5	1	Poland	Maksymilian Swed, Jan Wawrzkowicz, Daniel Sołtysiak, Mateusz Rzeźniczak	3:08.00	
	3	Portugal	Ericsson Tavares, João Coelho, Ricardo dos Santos, Omar Elkhatib	DQ	TR48.1 (Note: Starting outside the takeover zone)
