= 2019 European Athletics U23 Championships – Men's 4 × 400 metres relay =

The men's 4 × 400 metres relay event at the 2019 European Athletics U23 Championships was held in Gävle, Sweden, at Gavlehov Stadium Park on 13 and 14 July.

== Medalists ==
| Gold | Silver | Bronze |
|---|---|---|
| Germany; Maximilian Grupen; Marvin Schlegel; Fabian Dammermann; Manuel Sanders; Jean Paul Bredau* | Great Britain; Alex Haydock-Wilson; Lee Thompson; Joe Brier; Cameron Chalmers; Ellis Greatrex* | France; Loïc Prévot; Téo Andant; Lidji Mbaye; Fabrisio Saïdy; Diego Milla*; Lorenzo Ricque* |

*Athletes who ran in heats only

== Results ==
=== Heats ===
Qualification rule: First 3 in each heat (Q) and the next 2 fastest (q) qualified for the final.

| Rank | Heat | Nation | Athletes | Time | Notes |
|---|---|---|---|---|---|
| 1 | 1 | Germany | Jean Paul Bredau, Marvin Schlegel, Fabian Dammermann, Manuel Sanders | 3:05.72 | Q |
| 2 | 1 | Great Britain | Alex Haydock-Wilson, Joe Brier, Ellis Greatrex, Lee Thompson | 3:05.93 | Q |
| 3 | 2 | Italy | Michele Falappi, Andrea Romani, Lapo Bianciardi, Alessandro Sibilio | 3:06.90 | Q |
| 4 | 2 | Poland | Mikołaj Buzała, Cezary Mirosław, Mateusz Rzeźniczak, Maciej Hołub | 3:07.12 | Q |
| 5 | 2 | Spain | Adrián Rocandio, Jesús Serrano, Alfredo Jiménez, Manuel Guijarro | 3:07.40 | Q, SB |
| 6 | 1 | Belgium | Sven Van Den Bergh, Camille Snyders, Alexander Doom, Jonathan Sacoor | 3:07.43 | Q |
| 7 | 2 | France | Diego Milla, Teo Andant, Lidji Mbaye, Lorenzo Ricque | 3:07.71 | q |
| 8 | 1 | Switzerland | Vincent Notz, Ryan Wyss, Filippo Moggi, Charles Devantay | 3:08.59 | q, NU23R |
| 9 | 2 | Latvia | Iļja Petrušenko, Daniels Bambals, Valērijs Valiņščikovs, Austris Karpinskis | 3:08.88 | SB |
| 10 | 1 | Romania | David-Iustin Nastase, Zeno Moraru, Mihai Cristian Pislaru, Robert Parge | 3:09.24 | SB |
| 11 | 2 | Slovenia | Jure Grkman, Žiga Kopač, Rok Ferlan, Lovro Mesec Košir | 3:09.26 | SB |
| 11 | 1 | Turkey | Mahsum Korkmaz, Sinan Ören, Ekrem Ayhan, Akın Özyürek | 3:09.66 | SB |
| 12 | 1 | Austria | Dominik Hufnagl, Nico Garea, Felix Einramhof, Sebastian Gaugl | 3:14.57 | NU23R |

=== Final ===
| Rank | Nation | Athletes | Time | Notes |
|---|---|---|---|---|
| 1st place, gold medalist(s) | Germany | Maximilian Grupen, Marvin Schlegel, Fabian Dammermann, Manuel Sanders | 3:03.92 | SB |
| 2nd place, silver medalist(s) | Great Britain | Alex Haydock-Wilson, Lee Thompson, Joe Brier, Cameron Chalmers | 3:04.59 | |
| 3rd place, bronze medalist(s) | France | Loïc Prévot, Téo Andant, Lidji Mbaye, Fabrisio Saïdy | 3:05.36 | |
| 4 | Poland | Mateusz Rzeźniczak, Cezary Mirosław, Maciej Hołub, Tymoteusz Zimny | 3:07.37 | |
| 5 | Spain | Adrián Rocandio, Manuel Guijarro, Jesús Serrano, Aleix Porras | 3:07.62 | |
| 6 | Switzerland | Vincent Notz, Filippo Moggi, Ryan Wyss, Charles Devantay | 3:10.46 | |
| | Italy | Brayan Lopez, Andrea Romani, Vladimir Aceti, Alessandro Sibilio | DQ | R163.2(b) |
| | Belgium | Alexander Doom, Camille Snyders, Sven Van Den Bergh, Jonathan Sacoor | DNF | |
