= Alexander Doom =

Belgian sprinter (born 1997)

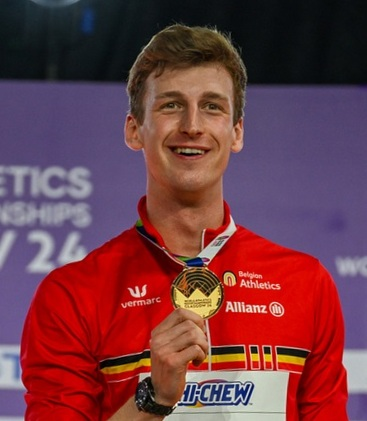
- Doom after winning gold at the 2024 World Indoor Championships

Personal information
- Born: 25 April 1997 (age 29) Roeselare, Belgium

Sport
- Sport: Athletics
- Event: 400 metres
- Club: KAV Roeselare
- Coached by: Christ Doom; Philip Gilson(-2024); Tine Bex & Koen Bellemans(2024-

Achievements and titles
- Personal bests: Outdoor; 200 metres: 21.10 (Sint-Niklaas 2022); 400 metres: 44.15 NR (Rome 2024); Indoor; 400 metres: 45.25 NR (Glasgow 2024)
Medal record
World Championships
Bronze medal – third place	2022 Eugene	4 × 400 m relay
Bronze medal – third place	2025 Tokyo	4 × 400 m mixed
World Relay Championships
Silver medal – second place	2025 Guangzhou	4 × 400 m relay
Bronze medal – third place	2024 Nassau	4 × 400 m relay
World Indoor Championships
Gold medal – first place	2022 Belgrade	4 × 400 m relay
Gold medal – first place	2024 Glasgow	400 metres
Gold medal – first place	2024 Glasgow	4 × 400 m relay
Silver medal – second place	2026 Toruń	4 × 400 m relay
European Championships
Gold medal – first place	2024 Rome	400 m
Gold medal – first place	2024 Rome	4 × 400 m relay
Silver medal – second place	2022 Munich	4 × 400 m relay
European Indoor Championships
Gold medal – first place	2023 Istanbul	4 × 400 m relay

Alexander Doom (pronounced [aːlɛkˈsɑndər ˈdoːm]; born 25 April 1997) is a Belgian sprinter specializing in the 400 metres. In 2024, he became the first male athlete to win the individual 400 metres and 4 × 400 metres relay at the same World Athletics Indoor Championships He has won several medals in international competitions with the Belgian 4 × 400 metres relay team and holds a personal best of 44.15 over the 400 metres.

== Athletics career ==
In 2013, Doom took first place in the 400 m at the European Youth Olympic Festival in Utrecht in a time of 47.93.

As part of the Belgian 4 × 400 m relay team, he competed at the 2015 European Junior Championships and the 2016 World U20 Championships where they placed 5th and 11th respectively.

In 2017, he was eliminated in the first round of the 400 at the European U23 Championships having run a time of 48.52 and finished fifth with the relay in 3:06.45.

In 2019, he managed to reach the semi-finals of the European U23 Championships in Gävle but was ultimately disqualified.

2021 represented a breakout year for Doom running a season best time of 45.34 in Bruxelle to win the Belgian Championships and qualifying to represent Belgium at the 2020 Summer Olympics in the 4 × 400 m relay.

At the games, the Belgian quartet, consisting of Doom, Jonathan Sacoor, Dylan Borlée, and Jonathan Borlée, just missed out on a medal, placing fourth. In the process they set a new Belgian record in a time of 2:57.88.

In July 2022, Doom competed at the 2022 World Athletics Championships in the individual 400 m and 4 × 400 m relay. Individually, he made it through to the semi-finals before being eliminated running a time of 45.80 in the semi-finals. As part of Belgium's relay squad, Doom won a bronze medal, taking third behind the United States and Jamaica in a time of 2:58.72.

The next month, at the European Athletics Championships in Munich, Doom won a silver medal as part of Belgium's 4 × 400 metres relay team.

At the 2023 World Athletics Championships in Budapest, Doom again competed in the individual 400 m and 4 × 400 m relay. In the heats of the 400 m, he broke the 45 second barrier for the first time, running a personal best of 44.92 to qualify for the semi-finals. However, he was unable to advance to the finals after a 45.77 semi-final performance to take fifth in his heat.

In 2024, he became the first ever Belgian male athlete to win gold at the World Athletics Indoor Championships taking the gold over favourite Karsten Warholm, the world record holder in the 400 metres hurdles.

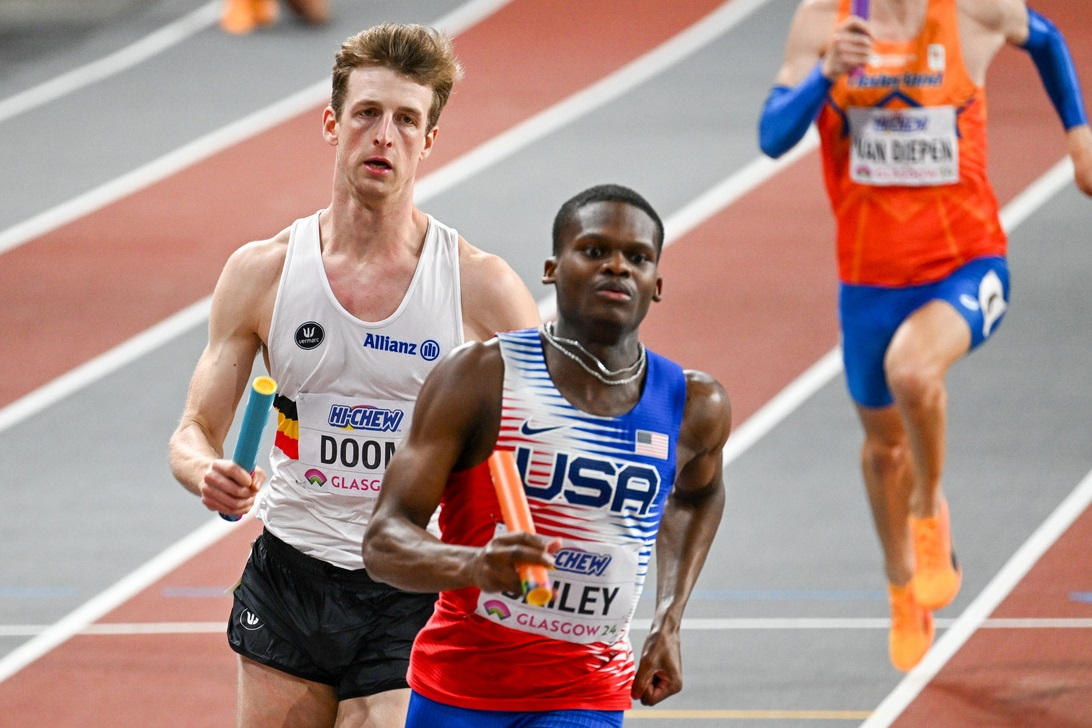
Doom trailing American Christopher Bailey on the final leg of the 4 × 400 m relay at the 2024 World Indoor Championships

Warholm had taken the lead at the break and held the lead until just 10–20 metres to go when he was edged out by Doom at the finish line. In winning gold, Doom also set an indoor personal best and Belgian national record in a time of 45.25, less than half a second off of his outdoor personal best.

The day after the 400 m finals, Doom competed alongside his Belgian teammates in the 4 × 400 m relay. In a similar manner to his individual 400 m victory the day prior, Doom, running the anchor leg, took the lead in the final meters to secure the win after having trailed for most of his leg, this time beating team USA's anchor Christopher Bailey at the line.

By taking both titles, he became the first male athlete to win the individual 400 metres and 4 × 400 metres relay at the same World Athletics Indoor Championships.

Later that year, at the World Athletics Relays in The Bahamas, he was on the team that qualified Belgium for the men's 4 × 400 metres relay at the 2024 Summer Olympic Games in Paris, France and at the 2024 European Athletics Championships, Doom won another two gold medals. First, he won and set a new championship record and a new Belgian record by winning the individual 400 metres title and on the closing day of the championships, he anchored the Belgian team winning the 4 × 400 metres.

By taking both European titles, he became the first athlete to win the individual 400 metres and 4 × 400 metres relay at the World Athletics Indoor Championships and the individual 400 metres and 4 × 400 metres at the European Athletics Championships all four in the same year.

At the 2024 Summer Olympics in Paris, France, Doom, having skipped the heats, started off the Belgian team in the final that finished 4th in the Mixed 4 × 400 metres relay. Having qualified for the men's 400 metres semi-final, Doom, suffering from pubalgia, was forced to pull up in the last bend and did not finish the race. It was his last race at the Paris Olympics.

Having missed the 2025 indoor season because of injury, Doom made his comeback to competition on April 26 at the 2025 Xiamen Diamond League. Less than a month later, at the World Athletics Relays in Guangzhou, China, he anchored Belgium's 4 × 400 metres relay team to winning their first ever silver medal at a World Athletics Relays and qualifying the team for the 2025 World Athletics Championships. At those 2025 World Athletics Championships in Tokyo, Japan, he won a bronze medal with the Belgian team in the mixed 4 × 400 metres relay.

In March 2026, he was selected for the relays at the 2026 World Athletics Indoor Championships in Poland. On 22 March, he won a silver medal in the men's 4 × 400 metres relay running alongside Jonathan Sacoor, Julien Watrin and Christian Iguacel.

== International competitions ==
Year	Competition	Venue	Position	Event	Notes
Representing Belgium
2013	European Youth Olympic Festival	Utrecht, Netherlands	1st	400 m	47.93
2015	European Junior Championships	Eskilstuna, Sweden	5th	4 × 400 m relay	3:14.12
2016	World U20 Championships	Bydgoszcz, Poland	11th (h)	4 × 400 m relay	3:10.78
2017	European U23 Championships	Bydgoszcz, Poland	29th (h)	400 m	48.52
2017	European U23 Championships	Bydgoszcz, Poland	5th	4 × 400 m relay	3:06.45
2019	European U23 Championships	Gävle, Sweden	7th (h)	400 m	47.39^{1}
2019	European U23 Championships	Gävle, Sweden	6th (h)	4 × 400 m relay	3:07.43^{2}
2021	European Indoor Championships	Toruń, Poland	20th (h)	400 m	47.18
2021	European Indoor Championships	Toruń, Poland	4th	4 × 400 m relay	3:06.96
2021	Olympic Games	Tokyo, Japan	4th	4 × 400 m relay	2:57.88 NR
2022	World Indoor Championships	Belgrade, Serbia	1st	4 × 400 m relay	3:06.52
2022	World Championships	Eugene, United States	19th (sf)	400 m	45.80
2022	World Championships	Eugene, United States	3rd	4 × 400 m relay	2:58.72
2022	European Championships	Munich, Germany	13th (sf)	400 m	45.77
2022	European Championships	Munich, Germany	2nd	4 × 400 m relay	2:59.49
2023	European Indoor Championships	Istanbul, Turkey	6th (sf)	400 m	46.12^{3}
2023	European Indoor Championships	Istanbul, Turkey	1st	4 × 400 m relay	3:05.83
2023	World Championships	Budapest, Hungary	18th (sf)	400 m	45.57
2023	World Championships	Budapest, Hungary	9th (h)	4 × 400 m relay	3:00.33
2024	World Indoor Championships	Glasgow, Scotland	1st	400 m	45.25 NR
2024	World Indoor Championships	Glasgow, Scotland	1st	4 × 400 m relay	3:02.54
2024	World Relays	Nassau, Bahamas	3rd	4 × 400 m	3:01.16
2024	European Championships	Rome, Italy	1st	400 m	44.15 NR CHB
2024	European Championships	Rome, Italy	1st	4 × 400 m relay	2:59.84
2024	European Championships	Rome, Italy	4th	4 × 400 m mixed	3:11.03
2024	Olympic Games	Paris, France	23rd (sf)	400 m	1:55.10
2024	Olympic Games	Paris, France	4th	4 × 400 m mixed relay	3:10.74 NR
2025	World Relays	Guangzhou, China	2nd	4 × 400 m	2:58.19 SB
2025	World Championships	Tokyo, Japan	28th (h)	400 m	45.10
2025	World Championships	Tokyo, Japan	4th	4 × 400 m relay	2:59.48
2025	World Championships	Tokyo, Japan	3rd	4 × 400 m mixed	3:10.61
2026	World Indoor Championships	Toruń, Poland	2nd	4 × 400 m relay	3:03.29

^{1}Disqualified in the semifinals
^{2}Did not finish in the final
^{3}Did not start in the final

== Personal bests ==
Outdoor

- 200 metres – 21.10 (+0.6 m/s, Sint-Niklaas 2022)
- 400 metres – 44.15 NR (Rome 2024)

Indoor

- 200 metres – 22.10 (Ghent 2017)
- 400 metres – 45.25 NR (Glasgow 2024)

== See also ==
- Belgian men's 4 × 400 metres relay team
