= Cillin Greene =

Irish sprinter (born 1998)

Personal information
- Nationality: Irish
- Born: 12 February 1998 (age 28)
- Height: 1.90 m (6 ft 3 in)

Sport
- Sport: Athletics
- Event: 400 metres

Achievements and titles
- Personal best: 400 m: 45.61 s
Medal record
Men's athletics
Representing Ireland
World Athletics Relays
Bronze medal – third place	2024 Nassau	4×400 m mixed

Cillin Greene (born 12 February 1998) is an Irish athlete. He competed in the mixed 4 × 400 metres relay event at the 2020 Summer Olympics.
