= Christian Iguacel =

Belgian sprinter (born 1996)

Personal information
- Born: 2 May 1996 (age 30)
- Height: 1.97 m (6 ft 6 in)
- Weight: 78 kg (172 lb)

Sport
- Sport: Athletics
- Event(s): 200 metres, 400 metres
- Club: AV Lyra Lierse
- Coached by: Jo Verduyn, Lieve Van Mechelen, Kristof Beyens
Medal record
Men's athletics
Representing Belgium
World Indoor Championships
Gold medal – first place	2024 Glasgow	4 × 400 m relay
Silver medal – second place	2026 Toruń	4 × 400 m relay
European Championships
Gold medal – first place	2024 Rome	4 × 400 m relay
European Indoor Championships
Silver medal – second place	2025 Apeldoorn	4 × 400 m mixed
Bronze medal – third place	2025 Apeldoorn	4 × 400 m relay

Christian Iguacel (born 2 May 1996) is a Belgian sprinter specialising in the 400 metres. Individually he has won national indoor and outdoor titles at his specialist distance, as well as winning two indoor titles at 200 metres. As a relay team member his greatest success is winning gold with Belgium in the 4 × 400 metres relay at the 2024 World Athletics Indoor Championships in Glasgow.

== Career ==
Iguacel is a three-time national indoor champion, winning his first title in the 200 metres in 2017, followed by the 200 metres again in 2023 and the 400 metres in 2024. He also won the 400 metres at the national outdoor championships in 2020.

Iguacel was selected to be part of the Belgium team for the 400 metres relay at the 2021 World Athletics Relays, but withdrew from the event due to a hamstring injury two weeks before it started.

Iguacel was on the winning team in the 4 × 400 metres relay at the 2024 World Athletics Indoor Championships in Glasgow. At the 2024 World Athletics Relays in The Bahamas, he was on the team that qualified Belgium for the 4 × 400 metres mixed relay at the 2024 Summer Olympic Games in Paris, France. In the mixed relay final, held the day after, the Belgian team dropped the baton during the change between Iguacel and teammate Camille Laus. He was again on the winning team in the 4 × 400 metres relay at the 2024 European Athletics Championships where he ran in round 1 qualifying the team for the final.

In February 2025 Iguacel ran a personal best of 46.70 seconds in the 400 metres at the Spanish Indoor Athletics Championships in Madrid, although his time was not sufficient to qualify for the event final. In March 2025, he won a silver medal at the 2025 European Athletics Indoor Championships in Apeldoorn, The Netherlands as a member of Belgium's 4 × 400 m mixed relay team and a bronze medal as a member of Belgium's men 4 × 400 m relay team, which missed out on a silver medal by two thousandths of a second.

In March 2026, he was selected for the relays at the 2026 World Athletics Indoor Championships in Poland. On 22 March, he won a silver medal in the men's 4 × 400 metres relay running alongside Jonathan Sacoor, Julien Watrin and Alexander Doom.

== Personal bests ==
Outdoor

- 400 metres – 45.71 (Oordegem 2022)

Indoor

- 200 metres – 20.90 (Ghent 2023)
- 400 metres – 46.70 (Madrid 2025)
