= Jonathan Sacoor =

Belgian sprinter (born 1999)

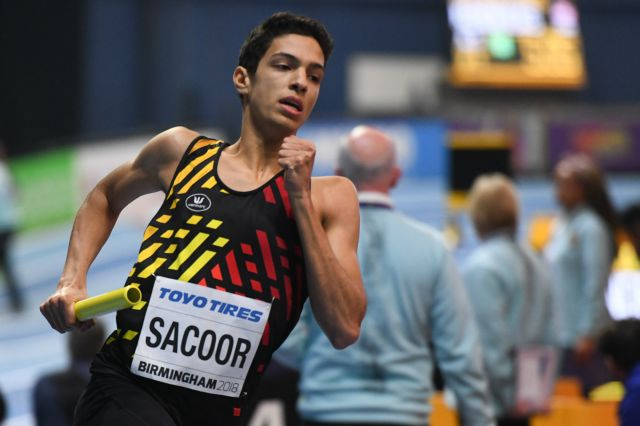
- Jonathan Sacoor in 2018

Personal information
- Nationality: Belgian
- Born: 1 September 1999 (age 26) Hal, Belgium

Sport
- Country: Belgium
- Sport: Athletics
- Event: 400 metres
- Club: Olympic Essenbeek Halle
- Coached by: Jean-Marie Bras; Jacques Borlée
Medal record
Representing Belgium
World Championships
Bronze medal – third place	2019 Doha	4 × 400 m relay
Bronze medal – third place	2022 Eugene	4 × 400 m relay
Bronze medal – third place	2025 Tokyo	4 × 400 m mixed
World Relay Championships
Silver medal – second place	2025 Guangzhou	4 × 400 m relay
Bronze medal – third place	2019 Yokohama	4 × 400 m relay
Bronze medal – third place	2024 Bahamas	4 × 400 m relay
World Indoor Championships
Gold medal – first place	2022 Belgrade	4 × 400 m relay
Gold medal – first place	2024 Glasgow	4 × 400 m relay
Gold medal – first place	2026 Toruń	4 × 400 m mixed
Silver medal – second place	2026 Toruń	4 × 400 m relay
Bronze medal – third place	2018 Birmingham	4 × 400 m relay
European Championships
Gold medal – first place	2018 Berlin	4 × 400 m relay
Gold medal – first place	2024 Rome	4 × 400 m relay
Silver medal – second place	2022 Munich	4 × 400 m relay
European Games
Bronze medal – third place	2023 Kraków-Małopolska	4 × 400 m mixed
European Indoor Championships
Bronze medal – third place	2025 Apeldoorn	4 × 400 m relay
World U20 Championships
Gold medal – first place	2018 Tampere	400 m
European U23 Championships
Silver medal – second place	2021 Gävle	400 m
European U20 Championships
Bronze medal – third place	2017 Grosseto	400 m

Jonathan Sacoor (born 1 September 1999) is a Belgian sprinter specialising in the 400 metres.

== Career ==
He first came to prominence early 2018, winning a bronze medal in the 4 × 400 metres relay at the 2018 World Indoor Championships in a new national indoor record of 3:02.51. Later that year, he became the first ever Belgian under-20 athletics world champion by winning the gold medal in the 400 m individual race at the 2018 IAAF World U20 Championships. He then followed up this performance with a gold in the 4 × 400 metres relay at the 2018 European Athletics Championships

He was a member of the University of Tennessee track and field team from 2019 to 2021.

In 2024, he was on the team that won the gold for Belgium in the men's 4 × 400 m relay at the World Indoor Championships in Glasgow, Scotland and at the World Athletics Relays in The Bahamas, he was on the teams that qualified Belgium for the 4 × 400 metres mixed relay and the men's 4 × 400 metres relay at the 2024 Summer Olympic Games in Paris, France. Later that same year, he was on the Belgian men's 4 × 400 metres relay team that won the gold medal at the European Athletics Championships and he ran a personal best in the final of the individual 400 metres, finishing 4th and posting for the first time in his career a sub 45 seconds. At the 2024 Summer Olympics, he ran the heats and finals of the mixed and men's 4 × 400 metres relay, finishing 4th in both.

In March 2025, he won a bronze medal at the 2025 European Athletics Indoor Championships in Apeldoorn, The Netherlands as a member of the Belgium men's 4 × 400 m relay team. In September at the 2025 World Athletics Championships in Tokyo, Japan he ran with the Belgian team in the heats of the mixed 4 × 400 metres relay qualifying the team for the final where he was replaced by Alexander Doom and the team won the bronze medal. He also participated in the heats and final of the men's 4 × 400 metres relay, finishing fourth in the final.

In March 2026, he was selected for the relays at the 2026 World Athletics Indoor Championships in Toruń in Poland. On the second day of competition, on 21 March, he won the gold medal in the first ever indoor mixed 4 × 400 metres relay running alongside Ilana Hanssens, Julien Watrin and Helena Ponette Their time of 3:15.60 was the fastest short track performance recorded for the event. One day later, on 22 March, he won a silver medal in the men's 4 × 400 metres relay running alongside Christian Iguacel, Julien Watrin and Alexander Doom. In June, he achieved the European Championship qualifying standard for the 400 meters at the Montreuil International Track & Field Meeting in France. At those 2026 European Athletics Championships in Birmingham, England, he finished a disappointing eighth in his semi-final of the individual 400 metres and finished fourth with the Belgium men's relay team in the 4 × 400 metres relay.

== Personal life ==
His father is Mozambican, of Portuguese and Indian descent, his mother is Dutch.

== International competitions ==
Year	Competition	Venue	Position	Event	Notes
Representing Belgium
2015	European Youth Olympic Festival	Tbilisi, Georgia	6th	400 m	49.86
2016	European Youth Championships	Tbilisi, Georgia	4th	400 m	47.71
2017	European U20 Championships	Grosseto, Italy	3rd	400 m	46.23
2018	World Indoor Championships	Birmingham, United Kingdom	3rd	4 × 400 m relay	3:02.51
2018	World U20 Championships	Tampere, Finland	1st	400 m	45.03
2018	World U20 Championships	Tampere, Finland	5th	4 × 400 m relay	3:07.05
2018	European Championships	Berlin, Germany	1st	4 × 400 m relay	2:59.47
2019	World Relays	Yokohama, Japan	3rd	4 × 400 m relay	3:02.70
2019	European U23 Championships	Gävle, Sweden	6th (h)	4 × 400 m relay	3:07.43^{1}
2019	World Championships	Doha, Qatar	12th (sf)	400 m	45.03
2019	World Championships	Doha, Qatar	3rd	4 × 400 m relay	2.58.78
2021	Olympic Games	Tokyo, Japan	22nd (sf)	400 m	45.88
2021	Olympic Games	Tokyo, Japan	4th	4 × 400 m relay	2:57.88
2022	World Indoor Championships	Belgrade, Serbia	1st	4 × 400 m relay	3:06.52
2022	World Championships	Eugene, United States	4th (h)	4 × 400 m relay	3:01.96
2022	European Championships	Munich, Germany	4th (h)	4 × 400 m relay	3:01.80
2023	European Games	Chorzów, Poland	3rd	4 × 400 m mixed	3:12.97
2024	World Indoor Championships	Glasgow, Scotland	1st	4 × 400 m relay	3:03.54
2024	World Relays	Nassau, Bahamas	3rd	4 × 400 m relay	3:01.16
2024	European Championships	Rome, Italy	1st	4 × 400 m relay	2:59.84 EL
2024	European Championships	Rome, Italy	4th	400 m	44.98
2024	European Championships	Rome, Italy	4th	4 × 400 m mixed	3:11.03
2024	Olympic Games	Paris, France	21st (h)	400 m	45.08
2024	Olympic Games	Paris, France	4th	4 × 400 m mixed relay	3:09.36 NR
2024	Olympic Games	Paris, France	4th	4 × 400 m relay	2:57.75 NR
2025	European Indoor Championships	Apeldoorn, Netherlands	10th (sf)	400 m	47.25
2025	European Indoor Championships	Apeldoorn, Netherlands	3rd	4 × 400 m relay	3:05.18 SB
2025	World Relays	Guangzhou, China	2nd	4 × 400 m	2:58.19 SB
2025	World Championships	Tokyo, Japan	4th	4 × 400 m relay	2:59.48
2026	World Indoor Championships	Toruń, Poland	1st	4 × 400 m mixed relay	3:15.60
2026	World Indoor Championships	Toruń, Poland	2nd	4 × 400 m relay	3:03.29
2026	European Championships	Birmingham, England	23rd (sf)	400 m	46.14
2026	European Championships	Birmingham, England	4th	4 × 400 m relay	2:59.51

^{1}Did not finish in the final

== Personal bests ==
Outdoor

- 200 metres – 20.90 (+0.4 m/s, Bruxelles 2024)
- 400 metres – 44.98 (Rome, 2024)

Indoor

- 200 metres – 21.58 (Ghent 2018)
- 400 metres – 46.30 (Apeldoorn 2018)

== See also ==
- Belgian men's 4 × 400 metres relay team
