= Sofia Lavreshina =

Portuguese sprinter (born 2003)

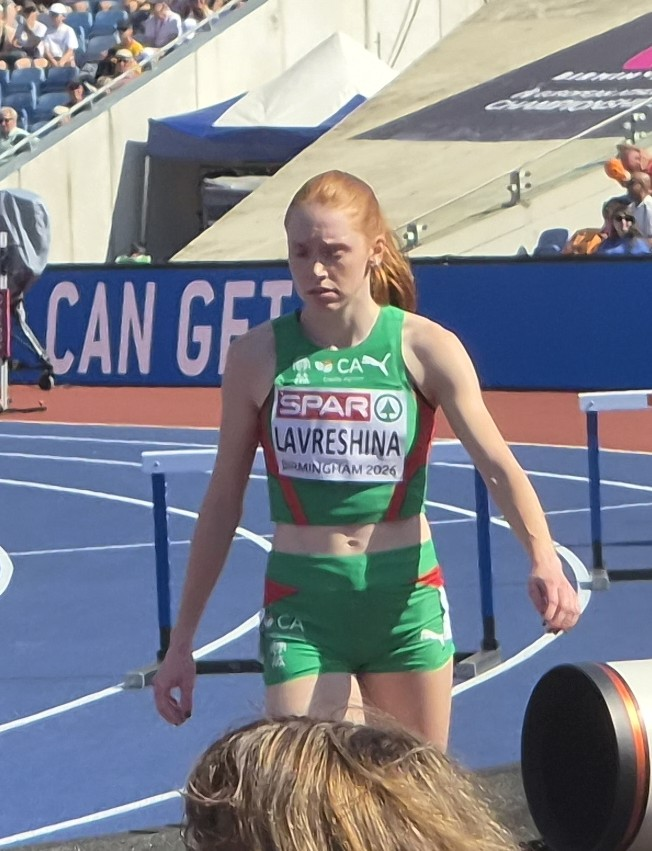
- Lavreshina at the 2026 European Championships

Personal information
- Born: 14 June 2003 (age 23) Pombal, Portugal

Sport
- Sport: Athletics
- Event: Sprint

Achievements and titles
- Personal bests: 400m: 51.87 (2026); 400mH: 54.31 (2026)

Sofia Lavreshina (born 14 June 2003) is a Portuguese sprinter and hurdler. She is the national record holder over 400 metres indoors, and won the 400 metres titles at the Portuguese Championships in 2025 and the Portuguese Indoor Championships in 2026.

== Biography ==
From Pombal in the Leiria District of Portugal, she competes as a member of Sporting CP. Competing in California for Long Beach State University in the United States, Lavreshina broke a 36-year-old school record competing indoors in the 400 metres in January 2024, as she ran a time of 54.71 seconds. Lavreshina competed for Portugal in the women's 4 x 400 metres relay at the 2024 World Relays, in Nassau, The Bahamas, and at the 2024 European Athletics Championships in Rome.

In April 2025, she broke the Sun Beach State school record for the 400 metres hurdles, running 56.64 seconds in Long Beach. In August 2025, she won the 400 meters title at the Portuguese Championships, also placing third in the 400 metres hurdles behind Fatoumata Diallo at the championships.

She ran an indoors personal best and Portuguese indoor national record for 400 metres of 52.19 seconds in Glasgow in January 2026. The following month, she lowered that mark to 52.07 seconds on the World Athletics Indoor Tour in Madrid. The following month, Lavreshina set a championship record at the Portuguese Indoor Championships winning the 400 metres race in 52.33 seconds in Braga, breaking the record of Vera Barbosa which had stood since 2020.

In March 2026, she was selected for the 2026 World Athletics Indoor Championships in Poland. She was a semi-finalist in the 400 m at the championships. During the qualifying rounds, Lavreshina improved the national record with a time of 51.87 seconds. On 4 June 2026, at the Liese Prokop Memorial in St. Pölten, she won the 400 metres hurdles in a personal best 54.48 seconds. In July, she equalled the Portuguese national record for the 400 m hurdles in 54.31 seconds in Braga. She placed second at the Portuguese Championships over 400m hurdles in 54.69 seconds, behind joint national record-holder Fatoumata Binta Diallo. Competing at the 2026 European Athletics Championships in Birmingham, England, she was a semi-finalist in the 400 metres hurdles. She also competed in the women's 4 × 400 metres relay at the championships.
