= Cátia Azevedo =

Portuguese sprinter (born 1994)

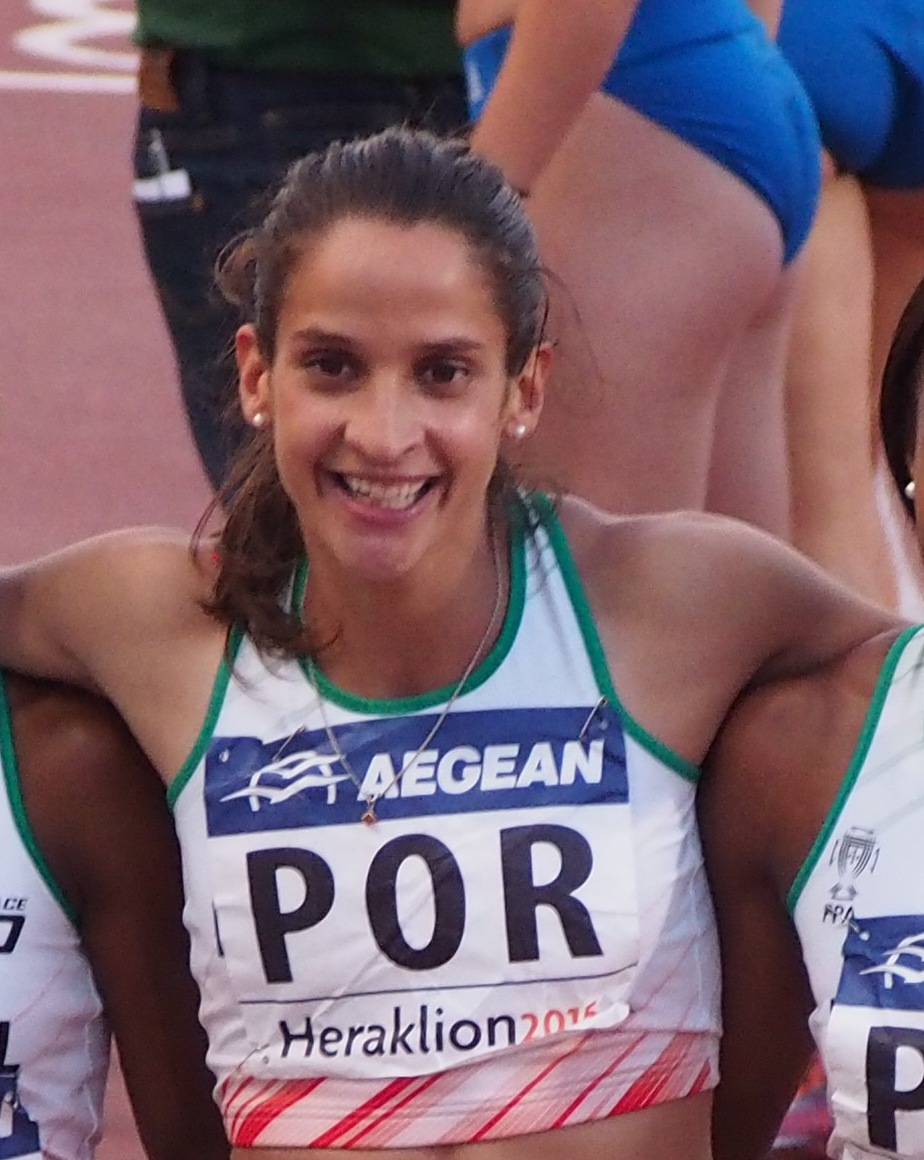
- Cátia Azevedo in 2015

Personal information
- Full name: Cátia Isabel da Silva Azevedo
- Born: 9 March 1994 (age 32) Oliveira de Azeméis, Portugal
- Education: Nursing School of Lisbon
- Height: 1.70 m (5 ft 7 in)
- Weight: 53 kg (117 lb)

Sport
- Sport: Athletics
- Event: 400 metres
- Club: Sporting CP

Achievements and titles
- Personal best: 400 m: 50.59 s (2021, NR)
Medal record
Women's athletics
Representing Portugal
Mediterranean Games
| Gold medal – first place | 2022 Oran | 400 m |
Ibero-American Championships
| Gold medal – first place | 2018 Trujillo | 400 m |
| Gold medal – first place | 2018 Trujillo | 4x400 m |

Cátia Isabel da Silva Azevedo (born 9 March 1994) is a Portuguese record-breaking sprinter specialising in the 400 metres, who competes for Portugal and Sporting CP. She won two gold medals at the 2018 Ibero-American Championships.

Her personal bests in the event are 50.59 seconds outdoors (Huelva 2021) and 53.10 seconds indoors (Madrid 2020). The first is the current national record.

Azevedo is also a nurse by training.

In October 2026, she was released from Sporting CP, following a contract proposal without improvement of conditions. The club argued that having been a mother recently would constitute a liability, and they wouldn't give her more than a one year extension, without increase in pay.

== International competitions ==
| Year | Competition | Venue | Position | Event | Notes |
Representing Portugal
| 2013 | European Junior Championships | Rieti, Italy | 5th | 400 m | 52.89 |
| 2014 | European Championships | Zürich, Switzerland | 18th (h) | 400 m | 52.87 |
| 2014 | European Championships | Zürich, Switzerland | 10th (h) | 4 × 400 m relay | 3:35.41 |
| 2015 | European U23 Championships | Tallinn, Estonia | 14th (h) | 400 m | 53.49 |
| 2016 | European Championships | Amsterdam, Netherlands | 12th (sf) | 400 m | 52.46 |
| 2016 | European Championships | Amsterdam, Netherlands | 13th (h) | 4 × 400 m relay | 3:32.48 |
| 2016 | Olympic Games | Rio de Janeiro, Brazil | 31st (h) | 400 m | 52.38 |
| 2017 | World Championships | London, United Kingdom | 39th (h) | 400 m | 52.79 |
| 2017 | Universiade | Taipei, Taiwan | 5th | 400 m | 52.39 |
| 2018 | World Indoor Championships | Birmingham, United Kingdom | 29th (h) | 400 m | 54.17 |
| 2018 | World Indoor Championships | Birmingham, United Kingdom | 8th (h) | 4 × 400 m relay | 3:35.43 |
| 2018 | Mediterranean Games | Tarragona, Spain | 5th | 400 m | 52.63 |
| 2018 | Mediterranean Games | Tarragona, Spain | 5th | 4 × 400 m relay | 3:34.21 |
| 2018 | European Championships | Berlin, Germany | 18th (sf) | 400 m | 52.23 |
| 2018 | European Championships | Berlin, Germany | 12th (h) | 4 × 400 m relay | 3:33.35 |
| 2018 | Ibero-American Championships | Trujillo, Peru | 1st | 400 m | 52.26 |
| 2018 | Ibero-American Championships | Trujillo, Peru | 1st | 4 × 400 m relay | 3:36.49 |
| 2019 | European Indoor Championships | Glasgow, United Kingdom | 22nd (h) | 400 m | 53.43 |
| 2019 | Universiade | Naples, Italy | 5th | 400 m | 52.07 |
| 2019 | World Championships | Doha, Qatar | 40th (h) | 400 m | 52.79 |
| 2021 | European Indoor Championships | Toruń, Poland | 24th (h) | 400 m | 53.28 |
| 2021 | Olympic Games | Tokyo, Japan | 17th (sf) | 400 m | 51.32 |
| 2022 | World Indoor Championships | Belgrade, Serbia | 19th (h) | 400 m | 53.01 |
| 2022 | Ibero-American Championships | La Nucía, Spain | 5th | 400 m | 51.58 |
| 2022 | Mediterranean Games | Oran, Algeria | 1st | 400 m | 51.24 |
| 2022 | World Championships | Eugene, United States | 19th (sf) | 400 m | 51.79 |
| 2022 | European Championships | Munich, Germany | 11th (sf) | 400 m | 51.42 |
| 2023 | World Championships | Budapest, Hungary | 32nd (h) | 400 m | 51.93 |
| 2024 | World Indoor Championships | Glasgow, United Kingdom | 14th (h) | 400 m | 52.92 |
| 2024 | World Indoor Championships | Glasgow, United Kingdom | 9th (h) | 4 × 400 m relay | 3:31.93 |
| 2024 | European Championships | Rome, Italy | 14th (h) | 400 m | 52.53 |
| 2024 | European Championships | Rome, Italy | 13th (h) | 4 × 400 m relay | 3:29.50 |
| 2024 | Olympic Games | Paris, France | 20th (rep) | 400 m | 52.04 |
