= List of Portuguese records in athletics =

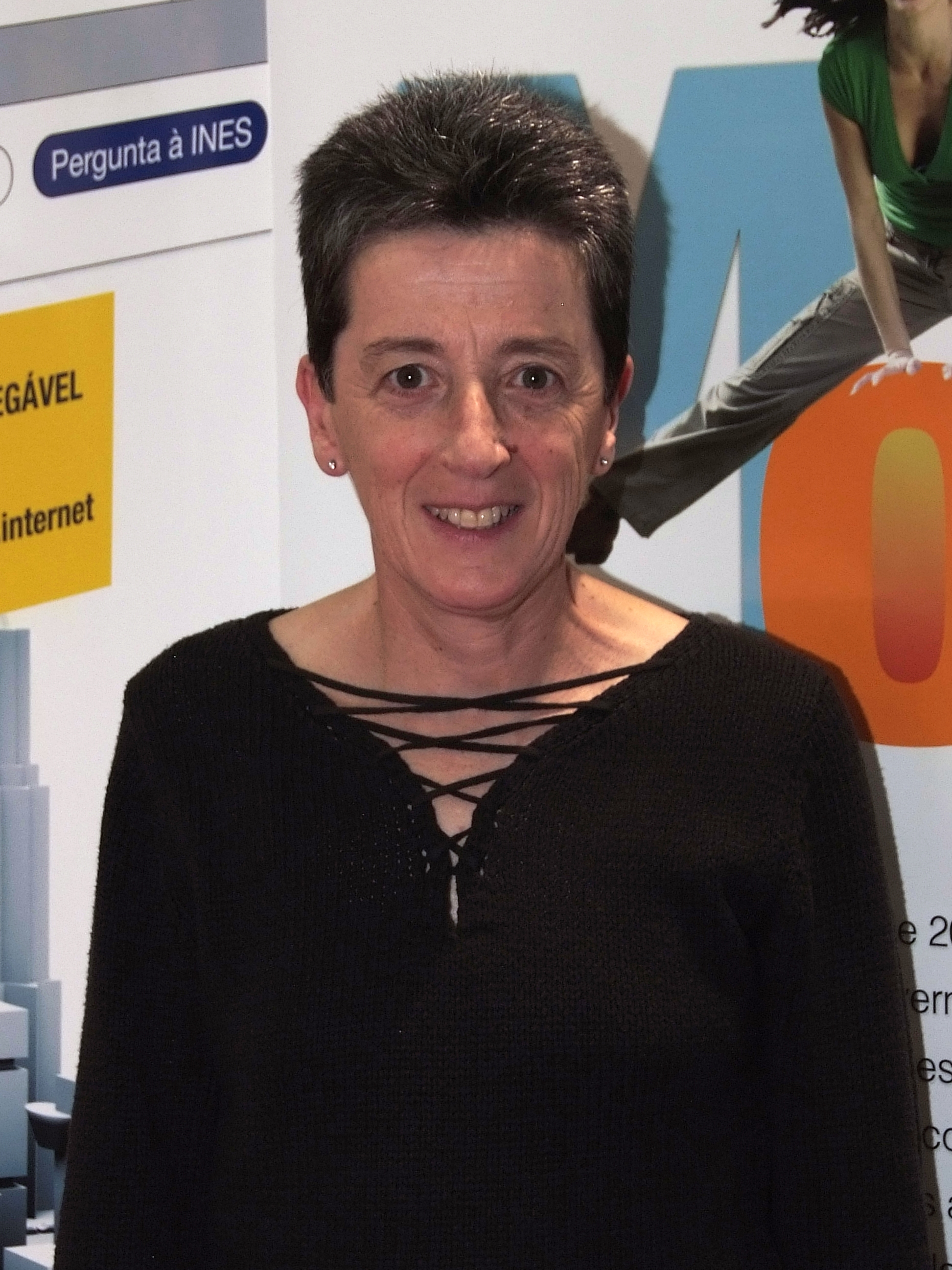
Portuguese former marathon runner Rosa Mota at the Qualifica 2012 trade fair, at Exponor, Porto, Portugal.

The following are the national records in athletics in Portugal maintained by its national athletics federation: Federação Portuguesa de Atletismo (FPA).

== Outdoor ==
Key to tables: Awaiting ratification Record not kept by FPA Not ratified or later rescinded by FPA

=== Men ===
Event	Record	Athlete	Date	Meet	Place	Ref.
100 m	9.86 (+0.6 m/s)	Francis Obikwelu	22 August 2004	Olympic Games	Athens, Greece	
150 m (bend)	15.02+ (+1.2 m/s)	Francis Obikwelu	27 August 1999	World Championships	Seville, Spain	
150 m (straight)	15.34 (−1.1 m/s)	Francis Obikwelu	16 May 2010	Manchester City Games	Manchester, United Kingdom	
200 m	20.01 (+1.6 m/s)	Francis Obikwelu	10 August 2006	European Championships	Gothenburg, Sweden	
300 m	33.09	Carlos Silva	2 May 1999		Viseu, Portugal	
400 m	44.79	João Coelho	3 August 2023	World University Games	Chengdu, China	
800 m	1:43.86	Isaac Nader	18 June 2025	XXIV Reunion Internacional	Guadalajara, Spain	
1000 m	2:16.30	Rui Silva	17 July 1999	Nice Nikaia	Nice, France	
1500 m	3:29.37	Isaac Nader	24 June 2025	Golden Spike Ostrava	Ostrava, Czech Republic	
Mile	3:48.25	Isaac Nader	12 June 2025	Bislett Games	Oslo, Norway	
2000 m	4:54.66	Rui Silva	7 September 1999	ISTAF	Berlin, Germany	
3000 m	7:39.69	António Leitão	26 August 1983	Memorial Van Damme	Brussels, Belgium	
5000 m	13:02.86	António Pinto	12 August 1998	Weltklasse Zürich	Zürich, Switzerland	
5 km (road)	13:10	Jose Carlos Pinto	31 December 2025	Cursa dels Nassos	Barcelona, Spain	
10,000 m	27:12.47	António Pinto	30 July 1999	DN Galan	Stockholm, Sweden	
10 km (road)	27:37 (Note: by World Athletics and official result source; 27:38 by FPA source, probably a typo)	José Carlos Pinto	11 January 2026	10K Valencia Ibercaja by Kiprun	Valencia, Spain	
15 km (road)	43:19	Eduardo Henriques	7 November 1999		Benavente, Portugal	
15 km (road)	42:17+	Samuel Barata	22 October 2023	Valencia Half Marathon	Valencia, Spain	
20,000 m (track)	57:18.4+ h	Dionisio Castro	31 March 1990		La Flèche, France	
20 km (road)	57:54	Domingos Castro	17 October 1999		Paris, France	
20 km (road)	56:31+	Samuel Barata	22 October 2023	Valencia Half Marathon	Valencia, Spain	
One hour	20942 m	Dionisio Castro	31 March 1990		La Flèche, France	
Half marathon	59:40	Samuel Barata	22 October 2023	Valencia Half Marathon	Valencia, Spain	
30 km (road)	1:29:00	António Pinto	14 April 2002		London, United Kingdom	
Marathon	2:06:36	António Pinto	16 April 2000	London Marathon	London, United Kingdom	
110 m hurdles	13.47 (+1.3 m/s)	João Almeida	8 July 2012	Portuguese Championships	Lisbon, Portugal	
400 m hurdles	48.77	Pedro Rodrigues	10 August 1994	European Championships	Helsinki, Finland	
400 m hurdles	48.77	Carlos Silva	11 August 1999	Weltklasse Zürich	Zürich, Switzerland	
2000 m steeplechase	5:47.68	Eduardo Pestana	25 July 2020		Ribeira Brava, Portugal	
3000 m steeplechase	8:12.19	Etson Barros	9 August 2025	IFAM Meeting	Oordegem, Belgium	
High jump	2.25 m (Note: outdoor best, indoor mark ratified as absolute record)	Vitor Korst	27 June 2020		Lisbon, Portugal	
Pole vault	5.71 m (Note: outdoor best; indoor mark ratified as absolute record)	Diogo Ferreira	17 June 2017	S.L. Benfica Meeting	Lisbon, Portugal	
Long jump	8.36 m (+1.2 m/s) (Note: Outdoor best; indoor mark ratified as absolute record.)	Carlos Calado	20 June 1997		Lisbon, Portugal	
Triple jump	18.04 m (−0.6 m/s)	Pedro Pichardo	11 June 2024	European Championships	Rome, Italy	
Shot put	21.56 m	Tsanko Arnaudov	24 June 2017	European Team Championships – First League	Vaasa, Finland	
Discus throw	67.51 m	Emanuel Sousa	10 April 2025	Oklahoma Throws Series	Ramona, United States	
Hammer throw	76.86 m	Vítor Costa	21 July 2004		Reims, France	
Javelin throw	84.78 m	Leandro Ramos	13 May 2022	Doha Diamond League	Doha, Qatar	
Decathlon	8213 pts	Mário Aníbal	30 June – 1 July 2001		Kaunas, Lithuania	
Decathlon	100m (wind) / Long jump (wind) / Shot put / High jump / 400m / 110m H (wind) / Discus / Pole vault / Javelin / 1500m; 10.96 / 7.23 m / 15.24 m / 2.01 m / 48.49 / 14.80 / 48.33 m / 4.80 m / 54.55 m / 4:28.28					
10,000 m walk (track)	39:44.91	João Vieira	30 July 2011	Portuguese Championships	Lisbon, Portugal	
20 km walk (road)	1:20:09	João Vieira	8 August 2006	European Championships	Gothenburg, Sweden	
35 km walk (road)	2:33:23	João Vieira	23 April 2022	Dudinská Päťdesiatka	Dudince, Slovakia	
35 km walk (road)	2:31:41	João Vieira	18 May 2025	European Race Walking Team Championships	Poděbrady, Czech Republic	
50 km walk (road)	3:45:17	João Vieira	4 March 2012	Portuguese Championships	Pontevedra, Portugal	
4 × 100 m relay	38.65	Portugal; André Costa; Francis Obikwelu; Arnaldo Abrantes; Yazaldes Nascimento	1 August 2015		Rieti, Italy	
4 × 200 m relay	1:24.20	(Portugal) Sporting CP; Ricardo Alves; Francis Obikwelu; Vítor Jorge; Carlos Calado	10 May 2003		Lisbon, Portugal	
4 × 400 m relay	3:03.59	Portugal; João Coelho; Mauro Pereira; Ericsson Tavares; Ricardo dos Santos	19 August 2022	European Championships	Munich, Germany	
4 × 400 m relay	3:01.78	Portugal; Ericsson Tavares; Omar Elkhatib; João Coelho; Ricardo dos Santos	10 May 2025	World Relays	Guangzhou, China	
4 × 400 m relay	2:59.70	Portugal; Pedro Afonso; Ericsson Tavares; João Coelho; Omar Elkhatib	20 September 2025	World Championships	Tokyo, Japan	

=== Women ===
Event	Record	Athlete	Date	Meet	Place	Ref.
100 m	11.10 (+1.8 m/s)	Lorène Bazolo	14 August 2021	Résisprint International	La Chaux-de-Fonds, Switzerland	
100 m	11.10 (+1.9 m/s)	Lorène Bazolo	14 June 2025	Meeting of Braga	Braga, Portugal	
100 m	11.09 (+1.0 m/s)	Tatjana Pinto	6 June 2026	Sparkassen Gala	Regensburg, Germany	
100 m	11.02 (+1.8 m/s)	Tatjana Pinto	25 July 2026	Portuguese Championships	Lisbon, Portugal	
200 m	22.61 (+0.8 m/s)	Lorène Bazolo	29 June 2025	European Team Championships	Madrid, Spain	
400 m	50.59	Cátia Azevedo	3 June 2021	Meeting Iberoamericano	Huelva, Spain	
800 m	1:58.94	Carla Sacramento	13 August 1997	Weltklasse Zürich	Zürich, Switzerland	
1500 m	3:57.71	Carla Sacramento	8 August 1998	Herculis	Fontvieille, Monaco	
Mile	4:19.51	Salomé Afonso	19 July 2025	London Athletics Meet	London, United Kingdom	
3000 m	8:30.22	Carla Sacramento	4 August 1999	Herculis	Fontvieille, Monaco	
Two miles	9:22.89	Jessica Augusto	14 September 2007	Memorial Van Damme	Brussels, Belgium	
5000 m	14:36.45	Fernanda Ribeiro	22 July 1995		Hechtel-Eksel, Belgium	
5 km (road)	16:59	Ana Mafalda Ferreira	24 September 2023		Viana do Castelo, Portugal	
5 km (road)	15:21 (Note: by World Athletics source; 15:22 by FPA source)	Mariana Machado	9 March 2025	Portuguese 5K Championships	Braga, Portugal	
5 km (road)	15:27.4 h	Ana Dulce Félix	22 May 2011	Österreichischer dm Frauenlauf	Vienna, Austria	
10,000 m	30:22.88	Fernanda Ribeiro	30 September 2000	Olympic Games	Sydney, Australia	
10 km (road)	30:58	Mariana Machado	11 January 2026	10K Valencia Ibercaja by Kiprun	Valencia, Spain	
15 km (road)	48:20	Aurora Cunha	17 June 1990		Portland, United States	
One hour	18027 m Mx	Rosa Mota	14 May 1983		Lisbon, Portugal	
20,000 m (track)	1:06:55.5	Rosa Mota	14 May 1983		Lisbon, Portugal	
20 km (road)	1:06:53+	Rosa Mota	16 November 1986		Tokyo, Japan	
Half marathon	1:08:33	Ana Dulce Félix	20 March 2011	Lisbon Half Marathon	Lisbon, Portugal	
25 km (road)	1:24:19+	Rosa Mota	16 November 1986		Tokyo, Japan	
30 km (road)	1:41:54+	Rosa Mota	16 November 1986		Tokyo, Japan	
Marathon	2:23:29	Rosa Mota	20 October 1985	Chicago Marathon	Chicago, United States	
100 km (road)	7:34:37	Alzira Lário	17 June 1994		Tourhout, Belgium	
100 m hurdles	13.14 (+2.0 m/s)	Isabel Abrantes	13 August 2000		Coimbra, Portugal	
400 m hurdles	54.45	Fatoumata Binta Diallo	17 September 2025	World Championships	Tokyo, Japan	
400 m hurdles	54.31	Sofia Lavreshina	11 July 2026	Meeting of Braga	Braga, Portugal	
400 m hurdles	54.31	Fatoumata Binta Diallo	7 June 2026	Halina Konopacka Classic	Warsaw, Poland	
400 m hurdles	53.55	Fatoumata Binta Diallo	12 August 2026	European Championships	Birmingham, United Kingdom	
400 m hurdles	53.30	Fatoumata Binta Diallo	27 August 2026	Weltklasse Zürich	Zurich, Switzerland	
2000 m steeplechase	6:09.85	Joana Soares	25 July 2020	National Club Championships	Ribeira Brava, Portugal	
3000 m steeplechase	9:18.54	Jéssica Augusto	10 June 2010	Gran Premio de Andalucía	Huelva, Spain	
High jump	1.88 m	Sónia Carvalho	3 June 2001		Vila Real de Santo António, Portugal	
Pole vault	4.50 m	Maria Eleonor Tavares	29 July 2011	French Championships	Albi, France	
Pole vault	4.50 m	Maria Eleonor Tavares	6 July 2016		Franconville, France	
Long jump	7.12 m (+1.3 m/s)	Naide Gomes	29 July 2008	Herculis	Fontvieille, Monaco	
Triple jump	15.01 m (+1.0 m/s)	Patrícia Mamona	1 August 2021	Olympic Games	Tokyo, Japan	
Shot put	19.92 m (Note: outdoor best, indoor mark ratified as absolute record)	Auriol Dongmo (Note: Auriol Dongmo Mekemnan represented Cameroon until 2017, transferring her eligibility to Portugal which became active in 2020)	16 September 2023	Prefontaine Classic	Eugene, United States	
Discus throw	66.60 m	Irina Rodrigues	10 March 2024	European Throwing Cup	Leiria, Portugal	
Hammer throw	69.55 m	Vânia Silva	29 May 2011	European Champion Clubs Cup Group A	Vila Real de Santo António, Portugal	
Javelin throw	59.76 m	Sílvia Cruz	21 June 2008	European Cup, First League, Group A	Leiria, Portugal	
Heptathlon	6230 pts	Naide Gomes	15–16 July 2005		Logroño, Spain	
Heptathlon	100m H (wind) / High jump / Shot put / 200m (wind) / Long jump (wind) / Javelin / 800m; 13.54 / 1.79 m / 13.87 m / 24.87 / 6.39 m / 41.66 m / 2:17.00					
Heptathlon	6311 pts	Jéssica Barreira	22–23 June 2026	Portugal Athletics Open	Lisbon, Portugal	
Heptathlon	100m H (wind) / High jump / Shot put / 200m (wind) / Long jump (wind) / Javelin / 800m; 13.15 (−0.1 m/s) / 1.62 m / 15.30 m / 24.13 (+2.2 m/s) / 6.48 m (−0.2 m/s) / 45.83 m / 2:20.20					
10,000 m walk (track)	43:08.17	Ana Cabecinha	19 July 2008		Seixal, Portugal	
20 km walk (road)	1:27:46	Ana Cabecinha	21 August 2008	Olympic Games	Beijing, China	
Half marathon walk (road)	1:36:10	Vitória Oliveira	15 August 2026	European Championships	Birmingham, United Kingdom	
30 km walk (road)	2:26:10+	Inês Henriques	15 January 2017	Portuguese Championships	Porto de Mós, Portugal	
35 km walk (road)	2:50:09+	Inês Henriques	15 January 2017	Portuguese Championships	Porto de Mós, Portugal	
Marathon walk (road)	3:41:36	Joana Pontes	15 August 2026	European Championships	Birmingham, United Kingdom	
50 km walk (road)	4:05:56	Inês Henriques	13 August 2017	World Championships	London, United Kingdom	
4 × 100 m relay	43.44	Portugal; Lorène Bazolo; Rosalina Santos; Lurdes Oliveira; Iris Silva	28 June 2025	European Team Championships	Madrid, Spain	
4 × 100 m relay	43.06	Portugal; Lorène Dorcas Bazolo; Tatjana Pinto; Beatriz Castelhano; Arialis Gandulla	15 August 2026	European Championships	Birmingham, United Kingdom	
4 × 400 m relay	3:29.38	Portugal; Marta Moreira; Lucrécia Jardim; Elsa Amaral; Eduarda Coelho	7 August 1992	Olympic Games	Barcelona, Spain	

=== Mixed ===
Event	Record	Athlete	Date	Meet	Place	Ref.
4 × 100 m relay	41.86	Portugal; Frederico Curvelo; Lorène Bazolo; Gabriel Maia; Arialis Gandulla	22 August 2025	Memorial Van Damme	Brussels, Belgium	
4 × 400 m relay	3:14.06	Portugal; João Coelho; Cátia Azevedo; Ricardo dos Santos; Fatoumata Diallo	25 June 2023	European Team Championships	Chorzów, Poland	

== Indoor ==
=== Men ===
Event	Record	Athlete	Date	Meet	Place	Ref.
50 m	5.79+	Francis Obikwelu	28 February 2004	Meeting Pas de Calais	Liévin, France	
60 m	6.53	Francis Obikwelu	6 March 2011	European Championships	Paris, France	
200 m	21.01	João Coelho	27 February 2022	Portuguese Championships	Pombal, Portugal	
200 m	21.01 OT	David Lima	6 February 2016	Botnia Games	Korsholm, Finland	
400 m	45.86	João Coelho	2 March 2024	World Championships	Glasgow, United Kingdom	
800 m	1:46.40	Rui Silva	19 February 1999		Ghent, Belgium	
800 m	1:45.05	Isaac Nader	22 February 2026	Copernicus Cup	Toruń, Poland	
1500 m	3:34.23	Isaac Nader	30 January 2024	Czech Indoor Gala	Ostrava, Czech Republic	
1500 m	3:32.44	Isaac Nader	19 February 2026	Meeting Hauts-de-France Pas-de-Calais	Liévin, France	
Mile	3:52.18	Rui Silva	15 February 2001	XL Galan	Stockholm, Sweden	
3000 m	7:39.44 (Note: outdoor mark ratified as absolute record)	Rui Silva	6 February 2000	Sparkassen Cup	Stuttgart, Germany	
3000 m	7:38.05	Isaac Nader	3 February 2026	Czech Indoor Gala	Ostrava, Czech Republic	
5000 m	13:41.93	Rui Silva	19 February 2011	Aviva Indoor Grand Prix	Birmingham, United Kingdom	
60 m hurdles	7.66	Rasul Dabó	28 February 2014	Moselle Athleror Meet	Metz, France	
60 m hurdles	7.66	João Almeida	6 March 2015	European Championships	Prague, Czech Republic	
300 m hurdles	36.39 OT	Diogo Barrigana	21 January 2026	Tampere Meeting	Tampere, Finland	
High jump	2.28 m (Note: ratified as absolute record)	Paulo Conceição	1 February 2020		Kirchberg, Luxembourg	
Pole vault	5.82 m	Pedro Buaró	10 February 2024	Portuguese Indoor Club Championships	Pombal, Portugal	
Long jump	8.46 m	Gerson Baldé	22 March 2026	World Championships	Toruń, Poland	
Triple jump	17.60 m	Pedro Pichardo	3 March 2023	European Championships	Istanbul, Turkey	
Shot put	21.28 m	Francisco Belo	5 March 2021	European Championships	Toruń, Poland	
Heptathlon	5980 pts	Samuel Remédios	10–11 February 2018	Portuguese Championships	Pombal, Portugal	
Heptathlon	60m / Long jump / Shot put / High jump / 60m H / Pole vault / 1000m; 6.92 / 7.52 m / 13.70 m / 2.03 m / 7.98 / 5.00 m / 2:57.33					
5000 m walk	18:52.25	José Urbano	22 February 1992		Braga, Portugal	
4 × 200 m relay	1:27.66	(Portugal) Sporting CP; Tiago Angelino; Paulo Neves; Edivaldo Monteiro; Vitor Jorge	6 February 1999		Espinho, Portugal	
4 × 400 m relay	3:06.57	Portugal; Ericsson Tavares; Ricardo dos Santos; João Coelho; Omar Elkhatib	3 March 2024	World Championships	Glasgow, United Kingdom	
4 × 400 m relay	3:04.75	Portugal; Pedro Afonso; Ericsson Tavares; Omar Elkhatib; João Coelho	22 March 2026	World Championships	Toruń, Poland	

=== Women ===
Event	Record	Athlete	Date	Meet	Place	Ref.
60 m	7.17	Lorène Bazolo	6 March 2022		Lisbon, Portugal	
60 m	7.17	Arialis Martinez	3 March 2023	European Championships	Istanbul, Turkey	
60 m	7.17	Tatjana Pinto	21 March 2026	World Championships	Toruń, Poland	
200 m	23.21	Lucrécia Jardim	28 February 1998	European Championships	Valencia, Spain	
400 m	52.64	Cátia Azevedo	27 January 2024	Astana Indoor Meeting	Astana, Kazakhstan	
400 m	51.61	Cátia Azevedo	22 May 2021	Meeting Internacional Jaen Paraiso Interior	Andújar, Spain	
400 m	51.87	Sofia Lavreshina	20 March 2026	World Championships	Toruń, Poland	
800 m	1:59.80	Patricia Silva	23 March 2025	World Championships	Nanjing, China	
1500 m	4:04.11	Carla Sacramento	25 February 2001	Meeting Pas de Calais	Liévin, France	
1500 m	4:01.98	Salomé Afonso	3 February 2026	Czech Indoor Gala	Ostrava, Czech Republic	
2000 m	5:30.31	Salomé Afonso	19 February 2026	Meeting Hauts-de-France Pas-de-Calais	Liévin, France	
3000 m	8:36.79	Carla Sacramento	17 February 2002	AVIVA Indoor Grand Prix	Birmingham, United Kingdom	
Two miles	9:19.39	Jéssica Augusto	20 February 2010	AVIVA Indoor Grand Prix	Birmingham, United Kingdom	
5000 m	15:06.52	Fernanda Ribeiro	7 February 1996	Russian Winter Meeting	Moscow, Russia	
60 m hurdles	8.08	Isabel Abrantes	17 February 2001		Espinho, Portugal	
High jump	1.88 m	Naide Gomes	5 March 2004	World Championships	Budapest, Hungary	
Pole vault	4.51 m	Marta Onofre	6 March 2016	Portuguese Club Championships	Pombal, Portugal	
Long jump	7.00 m	Naide Gomes	9 March 2008	World Championships	Valencia, Spain	
Triple jump	14.53 m	Patrícia Mamona	7 March 2021	European Championships	Toruń, Poland	
Shot put	20.43 m	Auriol Dongmo Mekemnang (Note: Dongmo Mekemnan represented Cameroon until 2017, transferring her eligibility to Portugal which became active in 2020)	18 March 2022	World Championships	Belgrade, Serbia	
Discus throw	55.35 m	Liliana Cá	12 March 2011	World Indoor Throwing	Växjö, Sweden	
Pentathlon	4759 pts	Naide Gomes	5 March 2004	World Championships	Budapest, Hungary	
Pentathlon	60m H / High jump / Shot put / Long jump / 800m; 8.48 / 1.88 m / 15.08 m / 6.45 m / 2:21.69					
3000 m walk	12:17.93	Ana Cabecinha	14 February 2015	Portuguese Championships	Pombal, Portugal	
3000 m walk	12:13.39	Vitória Oliveira	22 February 2025	Portuguese Championships	Pombal, Portugal	
4 × 200 m relay	1:39.60	(Portugal) Sporting CP; Sandra Almeida; Natália Moura; Patricia Rebelo; Maria do Carmo Tavares	29 January 2000		Espinho, Portugal	
4 × 400 m relay	3:31.93	Portugal; Fatoumata Binta Diallo; Carina Vanessa; Cátoa Azevedo; Vera Barbosa	3 March 2024	World Championships	Glasgow, United Kingdom	
4 × 400 m relay	3:31.37	Portugal; Sofia Lavreshina; Fatoumata Binta Diallo; Clara Martinha; Carina Vanessa	22 March 2026	World Championships	Toruń, Poland	

=== Mixed ===
Event	Record	Athlete	Date	Meet	Place	Ref.
4 × 400 m relay	3:22.36	Portugal; João Coelho; Carina Vanessa; Vera Barbosa; Ericsson Tavares	5 February 2022	Dynamic New Athletics Indoor Match	Glasgow, United Kingdom	
