= Ericsson Tavares =

Portuguese sprinter (born 2001)

Personal information
- Nationality: Portuguese
- Born: 29 January 2001 (age 25)

Sport
- Sport: Athletics
- Event: Sprint

Achievements and titles
- Personal bests: 200m: 20.90 (Braga, 2025); 400m: 46.15 (Toruń, 2026)

Ericsson Tavares (born 29 January 2001) is a Portuguese sprinter who primarily competes over 200 and 400 metres. He has been running internationally for Portugal since 2021, and ran in the Portuguese 4 x 400 metres relay team at the 2025 World Championships who set a new national record.

== Biography ==
A member of the Seia Athletics Centre in Seia in Guarda District of Portugal, he made his championship debut as he competed for Portugal at the 2021 European Athletics U23 Championships in Tallinn, Estonia, winning his 400 metres heat to reach the semi-finals in a personal best time of 46.61 seconds. That year, he was called-up to the senior Portugal team for the first time, running in the 4 x 400 metres relay at the 2021 European Athletics Team Championships.

By July 2022, he was a member of Benfica and set a new personal best of 21.32 seconds for the 200 metres whilst competing in France.

He ran in the 4 x 400 metres relay for Portugal at the 2024 European Athletics Championships in Rome, Italy, helping the team to a sixth place finish.

In January 2025, competing in Astana, Kazhakstan, on the World Athletics Continental Indoor Tour, he ran a 400 metres indoor personal best of 46.72 seconds to move to third on the Portuguese all-time list. In March, he ran for Portugal at the 2025 European Athletics Indoor Championships in Apeldoorn, Netherlands, without progressing past the heats of the 400 metres. He competed for Portugal at the 2025 World Athletics Relays in Guangzhou, China, helping the men's 4 x 400 metres team qualify for the upcoming world championships. He competed for Portugal at the 2025 European Athletics Team Championships First Division in Madrid, Spain, in June 2025.

He ran in the men's 4 x 400 metres relay for Portugal at the 2025 World Athletics Championships in Tokyo, Japan, helping the team qualify for the final with a national record time of 2:59.70, running alongside Pedro Afonso, João Coelho and Omar Elkhatib, the first time a Portuguese team had run under three minutes.

Tavares ran a personal best of 46.15 seconds in the semi-finals of the 400 metres at the 2026 World Athletics Indoor Championships in Toruń, Poland. He also ran in the men's 4 x 400 metres relay on the last day of the championships, as the Portuguese team placed fifth in the final. He completed his relay leg despite suffering an injury at the beginning of the run, with Tavares accidentally spiked by Jamaican Delano Kennedy on the back of his Achilles tendon. Tavares was eventually taken out of the arena on a stretcher post-race.

Competing at the 2026 World Athletics Relays in Botswana, he was part of the Portugal men's 4 x 400 metres relay team which set a national record of 2:59.01 on the opening day. Competing at the 2026 European Athletics Championships in Birmingham, England in August, he was a semi-finalist in the 400 metres. He also competed in the men's 4 × 400 metres relay at the championships.
