= Isaac Nader =

Portuguese middle-distance runner

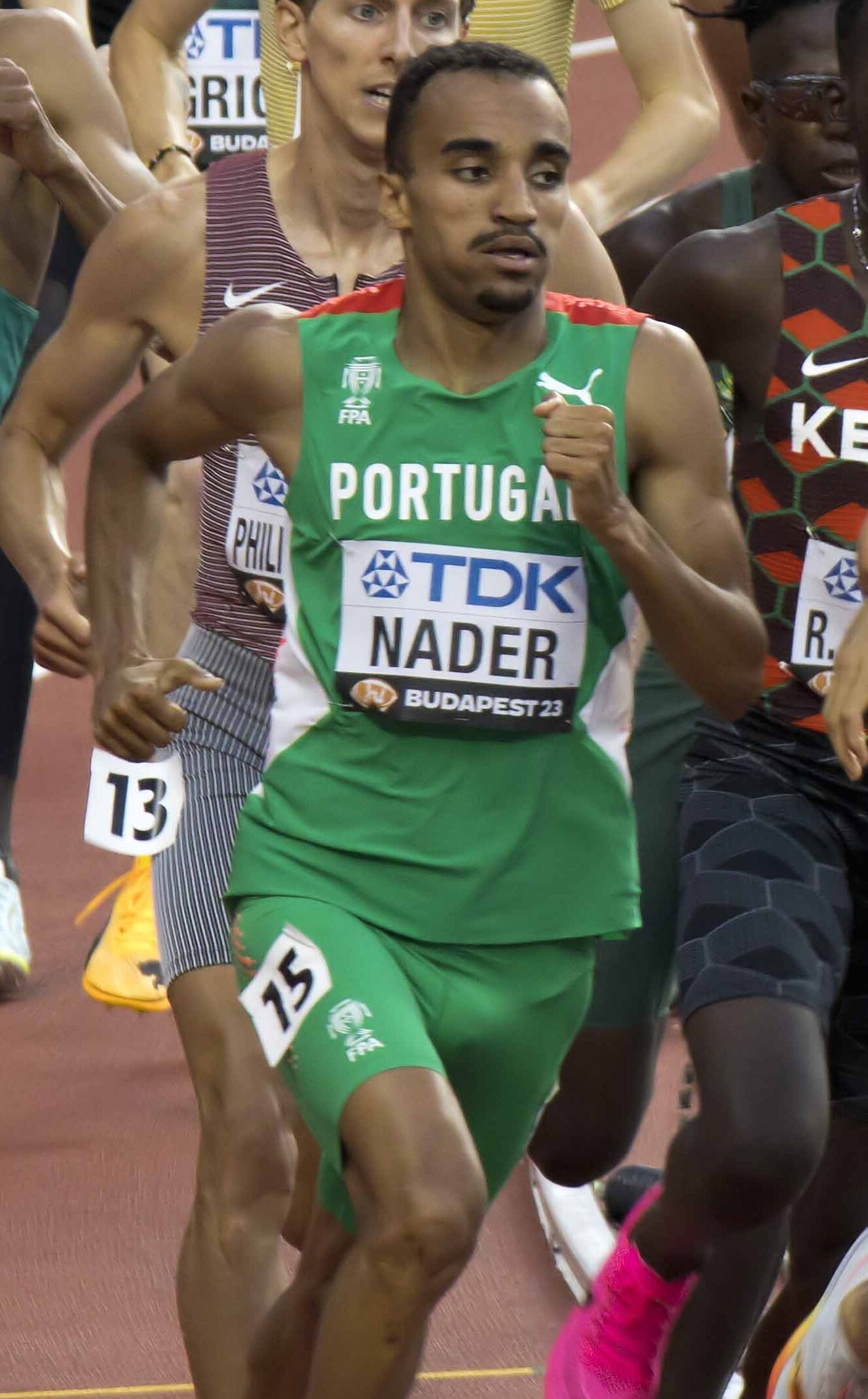
- Isaac Nader in 2023

Personal information
- Nationality: Portuguese
- Born: 17 August 1999 (age 27) Faro, Portugal

Sport
- Sport: Middle-distance running
- Events: 1500, mile and 3000 metres
- Club: S.L. Benfica

Achievements and titles
- Personal bests: 800 m: 1:43.86 NR (Guadalajara, 2025); 1500 m: 3:29.37 NR (Ostrava, 2025); Mile: 3:48.25 NR (Oslo, 2025); Indoors; 800 m: 1:43.86 NR (Pombal, 2025); 1500 m: 3:32.44 NR (Liévin, 2026); Mile: 3:48.25 NR (Ostrava, 2025); 3000 m: 7:53.40 (Madrid, 2022)
Medal record
Men's athletics
Representing Portugal
World Championships
Gold medal – first place	2025 Tokyo	1500 m
World Indoor Championships
Silver medal – second place	2026 Toruń	1500 m
European Indoor Championships
Bronze medal – third place	2025 Apeldoorn	1500 m
European Games
Silver medal – second place	2023 Kraków-Małopolska	1500 m
European Cross Country Championships
Silver medal – second place	2025 Lagoa	Mixed relay
European Champion Clubs Cup Cross Country
Gold medal – first place	2025 Albufeira	Mixed relay
Gold medal – first place	2026 Albufeira	Mixed relay

Isaac Zambujeiro Nader (born 17 August 1999) is a Portuguese middle-distance runner specialising in the 1500 m. He is the 2025 World Champion in the 1500 m, and the Portuguese record holder in the 800 m, 1500 m and mile, both indoors and outdoors.

He was the 2021 Portuguese indoor champion in the 1500 and 3000 m, and won the 3000 m at the 2021 European Athletics Team Championships in Chorzów. In 2025, Nader won a bronze medal in the 1500 m at the European Indoor Championships. In September 2025, he became world champion in the 1500 metres. He holds the Portuguese records both indoors and outdoors, in the 800 m, 1500 m and mile. At club level, Nader represents S.L. Benfica.

== Career ==
=== 2021–2023: Early success ===
In 2021, Nader won over 1500 m and 3000 m at the Portuguese Indoor Championships. He competed at the European Indoor Championships in Toruń, going out in the heats of the 1500 m and 3000 m. In May, he won the 3000 m at the European Team Championships Super League in Chorzów, whilst also placing fifth in the 1500 m. Nader set a new 1500 m personal best of 3:37.01 in finishing second behind Ismael Debjani at the Meeting Iberoamericano on 3 June. At the European U23 Championships, he won a bronze medal in the 1500 m, running a time of 3:40.58.

The following year, Nader retained his 1500 m title at the Portuguese Indoor Championships. At the World Indoor Championships in Belgrade, he made the final of the 1500 m, finishing tenth. In July, at the World Championships in Eugene, he went out in the heats of the 1500 m.

Nader set a new 1500 m personal best of 3:34.00 in winning at the Meeting Iberoamericano on 6 June 2023. He further improved his personal best to 3:31.67 at the Meeting Stanislas Nancy on 18 June, finishing second behind Reynold Cheruiyot. On 16 July, he finished seventh at the Silesia Diamond League, in a personal best of 3:31.49. At the World Championships in Budapest, Nader made the final of the 1500 m, finishing twelfth.

=== 2024–2025: World 1500 m champion and European Indoor bronze ===
In 2024, Nader set a new national record in the short track 1500 m, running 3:34.23 to win at the Czech Indoor Gala on 30 January. At the World Indoor Championships in Glasgow, he finished fourth in the 1500 m final. On 30 May, he improved his 1500 m personal best to 3:30.84 in finishing fourth at the Oslo Diamond League. In June, he competed at the European Championships in Rome, finishing tenth in the final of the 1500 m. At the Olympics in Paris, he made the 1500 m semi-finals.

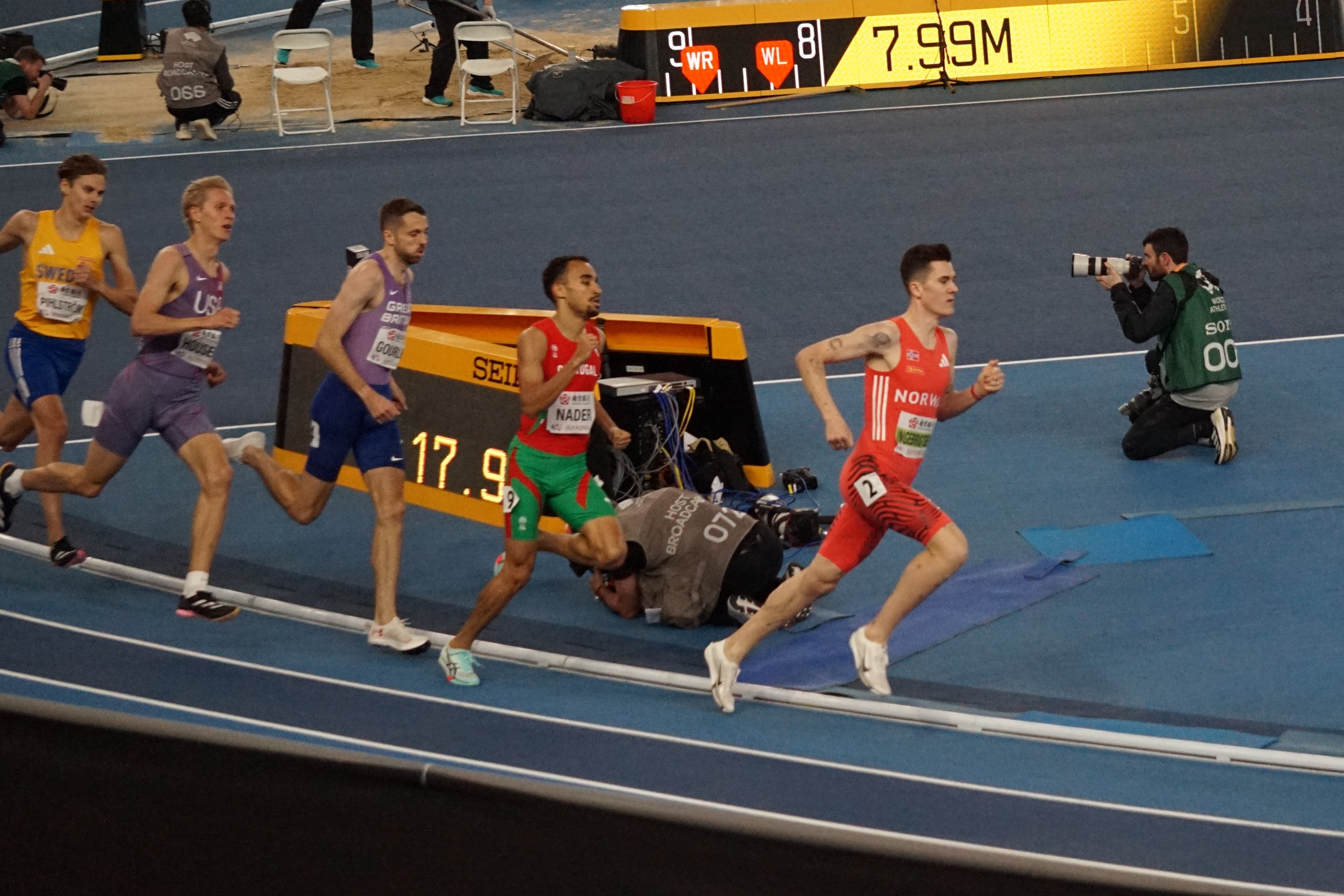
Nader (in second) competing in the 1500 m final at the 2025 World Indoor Championships.

Nader broke his own short track 1500 m national record at the Meeting Hauts-de-France Pas-de-Calais on 13 February, running 3:32.59 to finish second behind Azeddine Habz. He won a bronze medal over 1500 m at the European Indoor Championships, running a time of 3:37.10 in the final. At the World Indoor Championships in Nanjing, he finished fourth in the 1500 m.

On 12 June 2025, Nader won his first Diamond League, winning at the Bislett Games over the mile, setting a new Portuguese national record of 3:48.25. He set a new 800 m national record of 1:43.86 in winning the at the Reunion Internacional Ciudad de Guadalajara on 18 June. He also broke the Portuguese 1500 m national record by running a time of 3:29.37, his first time under the 3:30 barrier, to finish second behind Phanuel Koech at the Golden Spike Ostrava. He won over 1500 m at the European Team Championships First Division in Madrid, running a time of 3:39.08. On 19 July, he finished third at the London Diamond League, running a time of 3:31.55.

At the 2025 World Championships in Tokyo, Nader was the shock gold medallist in the 1500 m, narrowly beating Jake Wightman on the line to claim his first major title. Following the final, he stated "I'm happy to make history for our country, to be another Portuguese medalist at the World Championships. I'm so happy, I still can't quite believe it". In his first race since the title, Nader won the road mile at the XXXVII Milla Internacional de Berango on 11 October in 4:17.

== Personal bests ==
All information from World Athletics profile.

Type	Event	Time	Date	Place	Notes
Outdoor	800 metres	1:43.86	18 June 2025	Guadalajara, Spain	NR
Outdoor	1500 metres	3:29.37	24 June 2025	Ostrava, Czech Republic	NR
Outdoor	Mile	3:48.25	12 June 2025	Oslo, Norway	NR
Indoor	800 metres	1:46.18	23 February 2025	Pombal, Portugal	NR
Indoor	1500 metres	3:32.55	13 February 2025	Liévin, France	NR
Indoor	Mile	3:54.17	4 February 2025	Ostrava, Czech Republic	
Indoor	3000 metres	7:53.40	2 March 2022	Madrid, Spain	

== Personal life ==
Nader was born in Portugal to a Moroccan father and Portuguese mother, and nephew of the Moroccan international footballer Hassan Nader.
