= Ricardo dos Santos (athlete) =

Portuguese sprinter

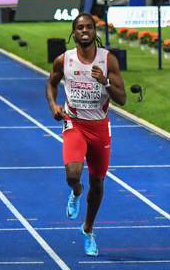
- Ricardo dos Santos in 2018

Personal information
- Full name: Vítor Ricardo dos Santos Soares
- Born: 18 December 1994 (age 31) Lisbon, Portugal

Sport
- Sport: Athletics
- Event: 400 metres
- Coached by: Clarence Callender (–2012); Linford Christie (2012–)

Vítor Ricardo dos Santos Soares (born 18 December 1994), known as Ricardo dos Santos, is a Portuguese sprinter specialising in the 400 metres. He won a bronze medal at the 2018 Ibero-American Championships. He reached the 400m final at the 2018 European Championships, setting a Portuguese national record of 45.14 in the semifinals.

== Personal life ==
Ricardo Dos Santos is single however has a child with Bianca Williams born 2020. As of December 2023, he also works as an "Amazon delivery driver alongside his [athletics] training".

Dos Santos was stopped by police in July 2020, later claiming the officers were racist. He also made a complaint about the officers’ conduct. The officers were cleared of misconduct, before a misconduct hearing was directed by the IOPC. In August 2022, Dos Santos was accused of failing to stop quickly enough for armed police. In October 2023, two officers were dismissed as a result of their actions in the 2020 incident because they lied about being able to smell cannabis. The search itself was not proven to be inappropriate and allegations of racism were also not proven.

The police misconduct panel who considered the 2020 incident deemed Dos Santos to be a 'reasonably credible witness' and also someone who 'did not willingly concede to an alternative viewpoint'. As an example, when Dos Santos was asked if his behaviour influences the way he is treated he said "I can behave as I like in the face of anybody. If I'm being mistreated, I deem it's appropriate as anybody to act in any way". The panel separately stated that they were not persuaded by Dos Santos' evidence about the capabilities of his Tesla vehicle, when he said it had automatically manoeuvred its way around a police vehicle to prevent a collision. Evidence suggested that Dos Santos' Tesla vehicle did not have such a capability.

On 4 October 2024, the Police Appeals Tribunal overturned the gross misconduct outcome and reinstated the jobs of the two officers involved in the incident as well as ordering they receive back pay.

== International competitions ==
| Year | Competition | Venue | Position | Event | Notes |
Representing Portugal
| 2012 | World Junior Championships | Barcelona, Spain | 52nd (h) | 400 m | 48.93 |
| 2014 | European Championships | Zürich, Switzerland | 7th (sf) | 400 m | 45.74 |
| 2015 | European U23 Championships | Tallinn, Estonia | 10th (h) | 400 m | 46.51 |
| 2015 | European U23 Championships | Tallinn, Estonia | – | 4 × 100 m relay | DQ |
| 2018 | Mediterranean Games | Tarragona, Spain | 7th | 400 m | 46.64 |
| 2018 | European Championships | Berlin, Germany | 7th | 400 m | 45.78 |
| 2018 | Ibero-American Championships | Trujillo, Peru | 3rd | 400 m | 46.45 |
| 2021 | European Indoor Championships | Toruń, Poland | 41st (h) | 400 m | 48.06 |
| 2021 | Olympic Games | Tokyo, Japan | 39th (h) | 400 m | 46.83 |
| 2022 | Ibero-American Championships | La Nucía, Spain | 11th (h) | 400 m | 47.16 |
| 2022 | Ibero-American Championships | La Nucía, Spain | 3rd | 4 × 400 m relay | 3:07.23 |
| 2022 | European Championships | Munich, Germany | 10th (h) | 4 × 400 m relay | 3:03.59 |
| 2024 | World Indoor Championships | Glasgow, United Kingdom | 4th (h) | 4 × 400 m relay | 3:06.57^{1} |
| 2024 | Ibero-American Championships | Cuiabá, Brazil | 10th (h) | 400 m | 47.07 |
| 2024 | European Championships | Rome, Italy | 6th | 4 × 400 m relay | 3:01.89 |
| 2025 | World Relays | Guangzhou, China | 7th | 4 × 400 m relay | 3:04.52 |
| 2025 | World Championships | Tokyo, Japan | 9th | 4 × 400 m relay | 3:09.06 |

^{1}Disqualified in the final

== Personal bests ==
Outdoor

- 100 metres – 10.60 (+1.0 m/s, Tampa 2015)
- 200 metres – 20.78 (+1.9 m/s, Kortrijk 2018)
- 400 metres – 45.14 (Berlin 2018)

Indoor

- 200 metres – 21.57 (Sheffield 2014)
- 400 metres – 47.14 (Pombal 2018)
