= Fatoumata Binta Diallo (athlete) =

Portuguese athlete (born 2000)

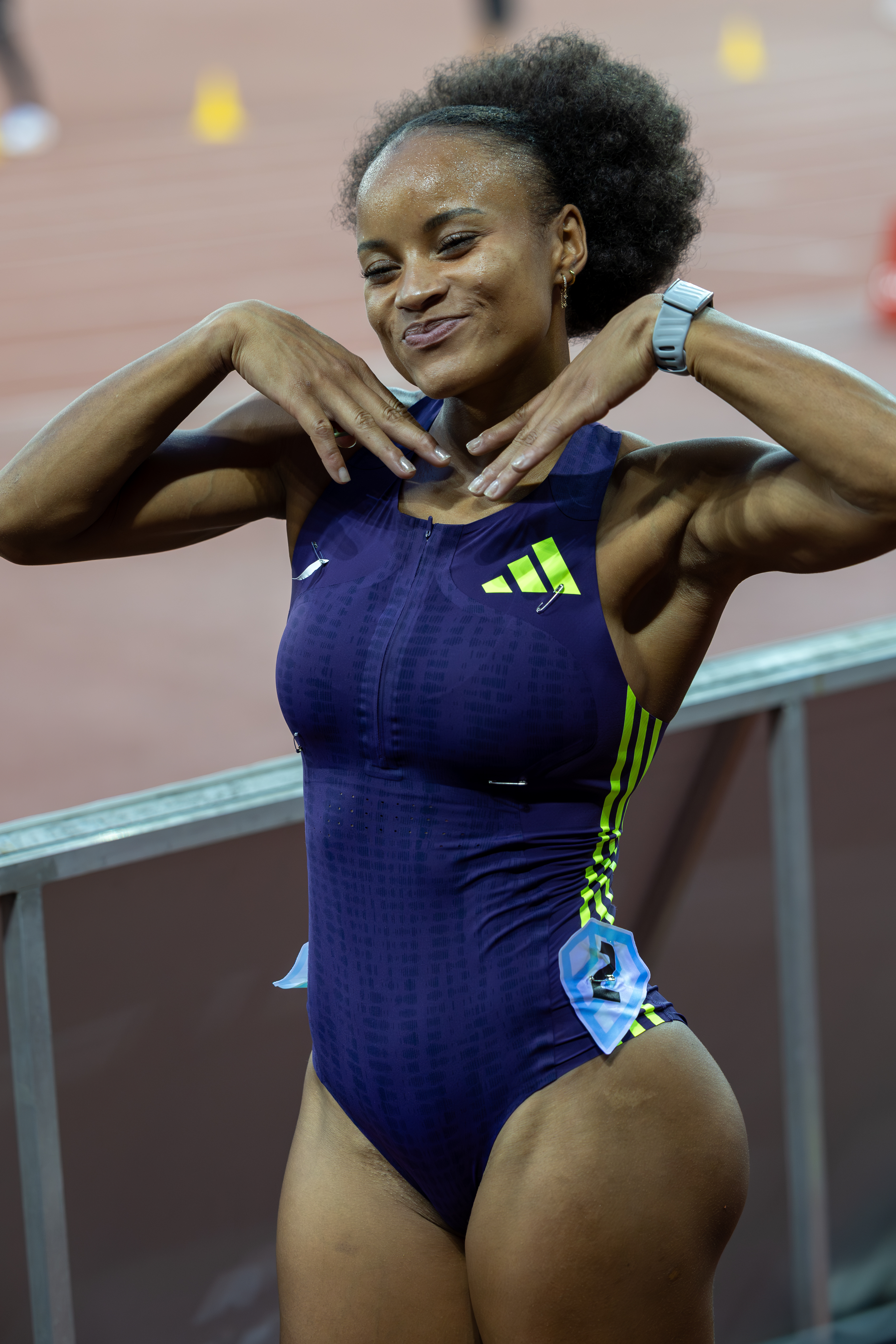
- Diallo at 2026 Weltklasse Zürich

Personal information
- Nationality: Portuguese
- Born: 6 April 2000 (age 26) Guinea

Sport
- Sport: Athletics
- Event: Hurdles
- Club: Benfica

Achievements and titles
- Personal bests: 400 m hurdles: 53.55 (2026) NR
Medal record
Women's athletics
Representing Portugal
European Championships
Bronze medal – third place	2026 Birmingham	400 m hurdles

Fatoumata Binta Diallo (born 6 April 2000) is a Portuguese track and field athlete. She is the national record holder over 400 metres hurdles and won the bronze medal at the 2026 European Athletics Championships. She has also won national titles over 200 metres and 400 metres indoors. She competed at the 2024 Olympic Games.

== Biography ==
=== Junior career ===
She participated at the Fatima Portuguese U18 Championships over 200 metres in 2015 and competed the 2015 European Youth Summer Olympic Festival in Tbilisi, Georgia. The following year, she won the bronze medal at the Pombal Portuguese Club Championships in the 400 metres. She continued her junior career that winter by winning the Faro Regional Winter Championships in 60 metres, 200 metres, and 400 metres. She then won the Marinha Grande Portuguese U20 Championships in the 400 m. Later, she won the 2018 Pombal Portuguese U20 Indoor Championships in the 400 m. It was not until 2019 that she started competing in hurdles, winning silver at the Portuguese U20 Championships in the 400 m hurdles. She was part of the Portuguese 4 × 100 m relay team at the 2019 European Athletics U20 Championships.

=== Senior career ===
In June 2023, she competed for Portugal in the 2023 European Athletics Team Championships First Division in Silesia running a 400 metres personal best of 55.57. In July 2023, she became Portuguese national champion over 400 metres hurdles. She competed at the 2023 World Athletics Championships in Budapest in the 400 m hurdles, lowering her personal best to 55.27 seconds, and placing her second in the all-time Portuguese list.

In February 2024, she won Portuguese national indoor titles over 200 m and 400 m. She was part of the Portuguese 4 × 400 m relay team which set a national record time of 3:31.93 at the 2024 World Athletics Indoor Championships in Glasgow.

She qualified for the final of the 400 metres hurdles at the 2024 European Athletics Championships, in a personal best and national record time of 54.65 seconds. She placed eighth overall in the final. She competed in the 400 metres hurdles at the 2024 Summer Olympics in Paris in August 2024, finishing second in her heat to qualify for the semi-finals in a time of 54.75 seconds. She finished in sixth place in her semi-final in a time of 54.93 seconds.

She finishes sixth in the 400 metres hurdles at the 2025 Meeting International Mohammed VI d'Athlétisme de Rabat, part of the 2025 Diamond League, in May 2025.

In June 2025, she won the 400 metres hurdles at the European Athletics Team Championships First Division in Madrid, in a time of 54.77 seconds. She competed at the 2025 World Athletics Championships in Tokyo, Japan, running 54.54 seconds to qualify for the semi-finals and setting a new national record of 54.45 seconds in the semi-final without advancing to the final.

In May 2026, Diallo competed in Poland and ran 55.27 seconds to win the 400 m hurdles at the Irena Szewińska Memorial. Competing at the Halina Konopacka Classic in Poland in June, she set a new national record of 54.31 seconds for the 400 m hurdles. In July, she won the Portuguese national title over 400 m hurdles in 54.46 seconds, ahead of joint national record-holder Sofia Lavreshina.

On 12 August 2026, she won the bronze medal at the 2026 European Championships in Birmingham, England, running a new Portuguese national record of 53.55 seconds in the final. At the 2026 Diamond League Final in Brussels in September, she placed sixth in the 400 metres hurdles. The following week, she competed in the 400 m hurdles at the inaugural World Ultimate Championship in Budapest.

== Personal life ==
She was born in Guinea but moved to Portugal at twelve years-old, after her parents had been there since she was five. From 2012, she studied at Escola Dr. Alberto Iria, in Olhão, Portugal. From 2019, she based herself in Paris.
