= Omar Elkhatib =

Portuguese sprinter (born 2001)

Personal information
- Full name: Omar Marques Elkhatib
- Nationality: Portuguese
- Born: 19 October 2001 (age 24)
- Spouse: Inês Alves

Sport
- Sport: Athletics
- Event: Sprint

Achievements and titles
- Personal bests: 400m: 45.22 (Birmingham, 2026)
Medal record
Men's athletics
Representing Portugal
Ibero-American Championships
Gold medal – first place	2026 Lima	400 m
Mediterranean Games
Gold medal – first place	2026 Taranto	400 m

Omar Marques Elkhatib (born 19 October 2001) is a sprinter who primarily competes over 400 metres. He ran in the Portuguese 4 x 400 metres relay team who were finalists at the 2025 World Championships and set a new national record.

== Biography ==
Elkhatib is originally from São Tomé and Príncipe. He is a member of Sporting CP in Lisbon. In July 2023, he ran 45.73 second for the 400 metres at the 2023 European Athletics U23 Championships in Espoo, Finland as he finished sixth in the final, setting a Portuguese national U23 record.

He competed for Portugal at the World Relays Championships in Nassau, Bahamas. He won the silver medal over 400 metres at the 2024 Ibero-American Championships in Brazil in May 2024, running a personal best 45.46 seconds. He ran in the 4 x 400 metres relay for Portugal at the 2024 European Athletics Championships in Rome, Italy, helping the team to a sixth-place finish. He was also a semi-finalist in the 400 metres at the Championships.

In March 2025, he ran for Portugal at the 2025 European Athletics Indoor Championships in Apeldoorn, Netherlands, without progressing past the heats. He competed for Portugal at the 2025 World Athletics Relays in Guangzhou, China, helping the men's 4 x 400 metres team qualify for the upcoming world championships.

In August 2025, he set a new personal best of 45.42 seconds for the 400 metres whilst competing in Fribourg, Switzerland. He ran in the men's 4 x 400 metres relay for Portugal at the 2025 World Athletics Championships in Tokyo, Japan, helping the team qualify for the final with a national record time of 2:59.70, running alongside Pedro Afonso, João Coelho and Ericsson Tavares, the first time a Portuguese team had run under three minutes.

In March 2026, he reached the semi-finals of the 400 metres at the 2026 World Athletics Indoor Championships in Toruń, Poland. He also ran in the men's 4 x 400 metres relay on the last day of the championships, as the Portuguese team placed fifth in the final.

Competing at the 2026 World Athletics Relays in Botswana, he was part of the Portugal men's 4 x 400 metres relay team which set a national record of 2:59.01 on the opening day. Later that month, he ran 45.47 seconds to win the gold medal in the 400 metres at the 2026 Ibero-American Championships in Athletics in Peru. Competing at the 2026 European Athletics Championships in Birmingham, England in August, he was a semi-finalist in the 400 metres, lowering his personal best to 45.22 seconds. He also competed in the men's 4 × 400 metres relay at the championships.
