= João Coelho =

Portuguese sprinter (born 1999)

Personal information
- Full name: João Ricardo Agostinho Coelho
- Born: 4 April 1999 (age 27) Vila Franca de Xira, Portugal

Sport
- Sport: Athletics
- Event: 400 metres
Medal record
European Games
Silver medal – second place	2023 Kraków-Małopolska	400 m
Bronze medal – third place	2019 Minsk	4×400 m mixed
Mediterranean Games
Gold medal – first place	2022 Oran	400 m
Summer World University Games
Gold medal – first place	2021 Chengdu	400 m

João Ricardo Agostinho Coelho (born 4 April 1999) is a Portuguese sprinter who competes at club level for Sporting of Portugal.

In 2022, he established the National Record (indoor) on 200 m. He won the gold medal during the 2022 Mediterranean Games in Oran, with his personal best, 45.41s, on 400 m.

== Notes and references ==
- João Coelho statistics
- João Coelho at World Athletics
- João Coelho at European Athletics
- João Coelho at Tilastopaja (registration required)
- João Coelho at Athletics Podium
- João Coelho at Olympics.com
- João Coelho at Olympedia
- João Coelho at InterSportStats
