= Běchovice – Prague Race =

Road race in Prague, Czech Republic

- Date: September
- Location: Prague, Czech Republic
- Event type: Road
- Distance: 10.031 kilometres (6.233 mi)
- Established: 27 May 1897
- Course records: Men's: 28:33 (1996) (Kenya) Laban Chege; Women's: 32:28 (2026) (Czech Republic) Tereza Hrochová
- Website: Official website
- Participants: 2,764 (2016)

The Běchovice – Prague Race is an annual running event which takes place in September between the Prague districts of Běchovice, where the race starts, and Žižkov, where the race ends. It is a point-to-point race which features a climb towards the end of the race, and is slightly longer than a 10K run at 10.031 kilometres (6.233 mi).

The race first took place in 1897 and was awarded the World Athletics Heritage Plaque in 2020 recognising the race as being the oldest continuously-run road race in Europe. In 1974 the race held a female category for the first time, although Helena Nerudová had run outside of competition in 1972.

== Past winners ==
=== Men-only era ===
Key: Course record

Edition	Year	Men's winner	Time (m:s)
1st	27 May 1897	Jakub Wolf (BOH)	39:03.0
2nd	1898	Jakub Wolf (BOH)	40:00.2
3rd	1899	Jakub Wolf (BOH)	38:54.0
4th	1900	Matyáš Špicka (BOH)	39:39.8
5th	1901	Ludvík Petzold (BOH)	39:14.0
6th	1902	Antonín Šmucr (BOH)	39:00
7th	1903	Antonín Šmucr (BOH)	40:00
8th	1904	Arnošt Nejedlý (BOH)	38:39.6
9th	1905	Arnošt Nejedlý (BOH)	39:00.4
10th	1906	Arnošt Nejedlý (BOH)	38:39.6
11th	1907	Arnošt Nejedlý (BOH)	37:44.2
12th	1908	Paul Nettelbeck (GER)	37:57.6
13th	1909	Antonín Dvořák (BOH)	35:45.4
14th	1910	Antonín Dvořák (BOH)	36:01.4
15th	1911	František Slavík (BOH)	35:50.0
16th	1912	Vladimír Penc (BOH)	35:43.2
17th	1913	František Slavík (BOH)	36:41.6
18th	1914	Antonín Kejha (BOH)	34:25.2
19th	1915	Josef Bledý (BOH)	37:47.0
20th	1916	Václav Hájek (BOH)	39:34.0
21st	1917	Jiří Carp (BOH)	39:39.6
22nd	1918	Antonín Kejha (BOH)	36:55.4
23rd	1919	Václav Rott (TCH)	39:53.6
24th	1920	Václav Vohralík (TCH)	34:20.0
25th	1921	Josef Liehne (TCH)	34:29.2
26th	1922	Josef Liehne (TCH)	35:33.0
27th	1923	Vilém Šindler (TCH)	34:52.4
28th	1924	Karel Nedobitý (TCH)	36:26.8
29th	1925	Václav Drozda (TCH)	34:57.4
30th	1926	Karel Nedobitý (TCH)	34:34.4
31st	1927	Josef Německý (TCH)	33:46.8
32nd	1928	Josef Německý (TCH)	33:23.6
33rd	1929	Karel Nedobitý (TCH)	34:42.6
34th	1930	Jaroslav Lédr (TCH)	34:06.8
35th	1931	Jan Slezáček (TCH)	33:36.6
36th	1932	Václav Žofka (TCH)	34:37.2
37th	1933	Otakar Rozvoda (TCH)	34:04.4
38th	1934	Josef Koščak (TCH)	33:03.4
39th	1935	Josef Hron (TCH)	32:32.8
40th	1936	Ludvík Bombík (TCH)	34:18.4
41st	1937	Josef Hušek (TCH)	31:44.2
42nd	1938	Jan Pivoňka (TCH)	33:29.6
43rd	1939	Ludvík Bombík (Bohemia and Moravia)	33:31.8
44th	1940	Václav Hošek (Bohemia and Moravia)	33:45.2
45th	1941	Antonín Vaněk (Bohemia and Moravia)	34:18.0
46th	1942	Josef Hušek (Bohemia and Moravia)	32:00.6
47th	1943	Jan Haluza (Bohemia and Moravia)	32:47.4
48th	1944	Jan Haluza (Bohemia and Moravia)	33:21.6
49th	1945	Emil Diringer (TCH)	34:10.0
50th	1946	Přemysl Dolenský (TCH)	33:32.4
51st	1947	Karel Zabloudil (TCH)	33:56.2
52nd	1948	Jaroslav Šourek (TCH)	32:56.8
53rd	1949	Jaroslav Šourek (TCH)	32:11.2
54th	1950	Jaroslav Liška (TCH)	32:58.2
55th	1951	Miroslav Herčík (TCH)	32:25.6
56th	1952	Jaroslav Šourek (TCH)	34:22.8
57th	1953	Jaroslav Liška (TCH)	32:28.8
58th	1954	Jiří Koller (TCH)	33:24.6
59th	1955	Ivan Ullsperger (TCH)	31:07.2
60th	1956	Pavel Kantorek (TCH)	31:34.0
61st	1957	Pavel Kantorek (TCH)	32:45.6
62nd	1958	Miloš Tomis (TCH)	31:05.0
63rd	1959	Mirko Gräf (TCH)	31:14.4
64th	1960	Josef Tomáš (TCH)	31:41.0
65th	1961	Pavel Kantorek (TCH)	30:46.6
66th	1962	Josef Tomáš (TCH)	29:50.0
67th	1963	Josef Tomáš (TCH)	29:43.4
68th	1964	Vladimír Balšánek (TCH)	31:21.4
69th	1965	Josef Tomáš (TCH)	31:34.8
70th	1966	Václav Mládek (TCH)	30:51.6
71st	1967	Václav Mládek (TCH)	29:51.8
72nd	1968	Václav Mládek (TCH)	30:47.4
73rd	1969	Stanislav Petr (TCH)	30:25.4
74th	1970	Stanislav Hoffman (TCH)	30:33.8
75th	1971	Pavel Pěnkava (TCH)	31:48.2
76th	22 October 1972	Martin Zvoníček (TCH)	31:13.4
77th	14 October 1973	Stanislav Hoffman (TCH)	29:24.2

=== Mixed era ===
Key: Course record

Edition	Year	Men's winner	Time (m:s)	Women's winner	Time (m:s)
78th	13 October 1974	Stanislav Hoffman (TCH)	30:12.0	Jarmila Honková (TCH)	41:08.2
79th	12 October 1975	Vlastimil Zwiefelhofer (TCH)	28:35.2	Šárka Pechková (TCH)	39:52.8
80th	10 October 1976	Dušan Moravčík (TCH)	30:45.2	Božena Sudická (TCH)	39:38
81st	9 October 1977	Stanislav Hoffman (TCH)	30:13.2	Božena Sudická (TCH)	37:24.2
82nd	15 October 1978	Vlastimil Zwiefelhofer (TCH)	29:47.6	Helena Ledvinová (TCH)	36:20.6
83rd	14 October 1979	Vlastimil Zwiefelhofer (TCH)	30:23.6	Šárka Pechková (TCH)	37:04.6
84th	12 October 1980	Ivan Uvizl (TCH)	29:47.6	Blanka Paulů (TCH)	37:04.6
85th	1981	Vlastimil Zwiefelhofer (TCH)	30:28.0	Šárka Pechková (TCH)	37:41
86th	10 October 1982	Lubomír Tesáček (TCH)	29:59.0	Ľudmila Melicherová (TCH)	34:45
87th	9 October 1983	Lubomír Tesáček (TCH)	31:51.0	Ľudmila Melicherová (TCH)	38:41
88th	30 September 1984	Lubomír Tesáček (TCH)	29:29.2	Ľudmila Melicherová (TCH)	33:48
89th	29 September 1985	Lubomír Tesáček (TCH)	29:46	Jarmila Urbanová (TCH)	36:19
90th	28 September 1986	Lubomír Tesáček (TCH)	29:18	Alena Močáriová (TCH)	37:12
91st	27 September 1987	Ivan Uvizl (TCH)	30:14	Ľudmila Melicherová (TCH)	34:54
92nd	25 September 1988	Petr Pipa (TCH)	30:15	Ľudmila Melicherová (TCH)	34:42
93rd	24 September 1989	Ivan Uvizl (TCH)	29:32	Mária Starovská (TCH)	34:33
94th	30 September 1990	Róbert Petro (TCH)	30:49	Iva Jurková (TCH)	35:59
95th	29 September 1991	Róbert Štefko (TCH)	29:52	Mária Starovská (TCH)	34:49
96th	27 September 1992	Róbert Štefko (TCH)	29:33	Vera Kunicická (TCH)	35:57
97th	26 September 1993	Michal Kučera (CZE)	30:03	Alena Peterková (CZE)	37:15
98th	25 September 1994	Jan Pešava (CZE)	30:09	Desana Šourková (CZE)	35:28
99th	24 September 1995	Luboš Šubrt (CZE)	30:11	Desana Šourková (CZE)	35:09
100th	29 September 1996	Laban Chege (KEN)	28:33	Leah Malot (KEN)	33:45
101st	28 September 1997	Jan Pešava (CZE)	28:58.8	Jana Klimešová (CZE)	35:12.9
102nd	20 September 1998	Róbert Štefko (SVK)	29:33.8	Helena Volná (CZE)	34:34.6
103rd	26 September 1999	Mykola Antonenko (UKR)	30:17.0	Petra Kamínková (CZE)	35:42.9
104th	8 October 2000	Maxim Yanishevskiy (UKR)	30:12	Petra Kamínková (CZE)	35:16
105th	30 September 2001	Róbert Štefko (SVK)	29:21	Petra Kamínková (CZE)	35:05
106th	29 September 2002	Miroslav Vanko (SVK)	29:46	Petra Kamínková (CZE)	34:54
107th	28 September 2003	Róbert Štefko (SVK)	29:34	Petra Kamínková (CZE)	34:34
108th	26 September 2004	Ali Mabrouk El Zaidi (LBA)	30:39	Petra Kamínková (CZE)	36:25
109th	25 September 2005	Róbert Štefko (SVK)	30:00	Petra Kamínková (CZE)	34:44
110th	24 September 2006	Jan Kreisiger (CZE)	30:41.0	Petra Kamínková (CZE)	34:52.9
111th	30 September 2007	Pascal Sarwat (TAN)	31:01	Petra Kamínková (CZE)	35:28
112th	28 September 2008	Róbert Štefko (SVK)	31:21	Petra Kamínková (CZE)	36:11
113th	27 September 2009	Ryan Vail (USA)	30:00	Petra Kamínková (CZE)	35:46
114th	26 September 2010	Milan Kocourek (CZE)	31:27	Ivana Sekyrová (CZE)	37:51
115th	25 September 2011	Elisha Sawe (KEN)	29:56	Ivana Sekyrová (CZE)	36:03
116th	30 September 2012	Samuel Kemboi (KEN)	29:11	Monika Preibischová (CZE)	34:53
117th	29 September 2013	Aleksandr Matviychuk (UKR)	29:41	Christine Chepkemei (KEN)	34:46
118th	28 September 2014	Hillary Kiptum Kimaiyo (KEN)	29:14	Nancy Nzisa Wambua (KEN)	33:18
119th	28 September 2015	Jakub Zemaník (CZE)	30:50	Eva Vrabcová (CZE)	33:27
120th	25 September 2016	Jiří Homoláč (CZE)	30:26	Simona Vrzalová (CZE)	34:20
121st	24 September 2017	Jakub Zemaník (CZE)	30:46	Eva Vrabcová (CZE)	34:05
