= Athletics at the 1920 Summer Olympics – Men's 1500 metres =

Men's 1500 metres at the Games of the VII Olympiad
- Venue: Olympisch Stadion
- Dates: August 18, 1920 (round 1); August 19, 1920 (final)
- Competitors: 29 from 12 nations
- Winning time: 4:01.8

Medalists
1st place, gold medalist(s)		Albert Hill	Great Britain
2nd place, silver medalist(s)		Philip Noel-Baker	Great Britain
3rd place, bronze medalist(s)		Lawrence Shields	United States

Official Video

The men's 1500 metres event was part of the track and field athletics programme at the 1920 Summer Olympics. The competition was held on Wednesday, August 18, 1920, and on Thursday, August 19, 1920. Twenty-nine runners from 12 nations competed. No nation had more than 4 runners, suggesting the limit had been reduced from the 12 maximum in force in 1908 and 1912. The event was won by Albert Hill of Great Britain, completing his middle-distance double (gold in the 800 metres and 1500 metres). It was the nation's second consecutive and third overall championship in the men's 1500 metres.

== Background ==
This was the sixth appearance of the event, which is one of 12 athletics events to have been held at every Summer Olympics. Two finalists from the pre-war 1912 Games returned: sixth-place finisher Philip Noel-Baker of Great Britain and seventh-place finisher John Zander of Sweden. Zander was the world record holder.

Czechoslovakia, Estonia, Japan, and Spain each made their first appearance in the event. The United States made its sixth appearance, the only nation to have competed in the men's 1500 metres at each Games to that point.

== Competition format ==
The competition consisted of two rounds, the format used since 1908. With a smaller field, the focus shifted to fewer semifinals with more qualifiers from each. Only four semifinals were held, with anywhere between 5 and 8 runners in each. The top three runners in each heat advanced to the final, for a 12-man final race (increased to 13 when one semifinalist was advanced after being obstructed).

== Records ==
These were the standing world and Olympic records prior to the 1920 Summer Olympics.

World record	John Zander (SWE)	3:54.7	Stockholm, Sweden	5 August 1917
Olympic record	Arnold Jackson (GBR)	3:56.8	Stockholm, Sweden	10 July 1912

No world or Olympic records were set during the competition.

== Schedule ==
Date	Time	Round
Wednesday, 18 August 1920	15:15	Round 1
Thursday, 19 August 1920	17:15	Final

== Results ==
Times were generally only published for the winners of each heat. Some of the times listed below are estimates based on contemporary reports of the races.

=== Round 1 ===
==== Heat 1 ====
Rank	Athlete	Nation	Time	Notes
1	Václav Vohralík	Czechoslovakia	4:02.2	Q
2	Albert Hill	Great Britain	4:03.2	Q
3	André Audinet	France	4:03.7	Q
4	Edvin Wide	Sweden	4:03.8	
5	Edward Lawrence	Canada	4:04.4	
—	Edward Curtis	United States	DNF	
—	Lucien Bangels	Belgium	DNF	
—	Carlo Martinenghi	Italy	DNS	
—	Tomeichi Ohura	Japan	DNS	

==== Heat 2 ====
Rank	Athlete	Nation	Time	Notes
1	Sven Lundgren	Sweden	4:07.0	Q
2	Duncan McPhee	Great Britain	4:07.2	Q
3	Lawrence Shields	United States	4:07.4	Q
4	Armand Burtin	France	4:07.7	
5	Tommy Town	Canada		
6	Giuseppe Bonini	Italy		
7	Theofiel Roekaert	Belgium		
—	Eivind Rasmussen	Norway	DNF	
—	Paavo Nurmi	Finland	DNS	
—	Bevil Rudd	South Africa	DNS	
—	José Luis Grasset	Spain	DNS	

==== Heat 3 ====
Rank	Athlete	Nation	Time	Notes
1	John Zander	Sweden	4:08.1	Q
2	Arturo Porro	Italy	4:09.0	Q
3	James Connolly	United States	4:10.0	Q
4	Maurice de Conninck	France	4:11.0	
5	Jean Delarge	Belgium	4:11.5	
—	Panagiotis Retelas	Greece	DNS	
—	Søren Nielsen	Denmark	DNS	
—	Jaroslav Procházka	Czechoslovakia	DNS	
—	Arnold Jackson	Great Britain	DNS	

==== Heat 4 ====
René Leray was advanced to the final after being interfered with by Villemson on the final lap.

Rank	Athlete	Nation	Time	Notes
1	Joie Ray	United States	4:13.4	Q
2	Philip Noel-Baker	Great Britain	4:14.0	Q
3	Léon Fourneau	Belgium	4:15.0	Q
4	Fritz Kiölling	Sweden	4:15.0	
5	René Leray	France	4:16.5	q
6	Saburo Hasumi	Japan		
—	Juan Muguerza	Spain	DNF	
—	Johannes Villemson	Estonia	DSQ	
—	Alfred Gaschen	Switzerland	DNS	
—	Ernesto Ambrosini	Italy	DNS	

=== Final ===
Rank	Athlete	Nation	Time
1st place, gold medalist(s)	Albert Hill	Great Britain	4:01.8
2nd place, silver medalist(s)	Philip Noel-Baker	Great Britain	4:02.4
3rd place, bronze medalist(s)	Lawrence Shields	United States	4:04.3
4	Václav Vohralík	Czechoslovakia	4:08.0
5	Sven Lundgren	Sweden	4:12.0
6	André Audinet	France	4:12.2
7	Arturo Porro	Italy	4:12.4
8	Joie Ray	United States	4:13.0
9	Léon Fourneau	Belgium	4:16.0
10	René Leray	France	4:25.0
—	Duncan McPhee	Great Britain	DNF
—	James Connolly	United States	DNF
—	John Zander	Sweden	DNF
