= Audinet =

Audinet is a French surname. Notable people with the surname include:

- André Audinet (1898–1948), French middle-distance runner
- Jean Guillaume Audinet-Serville (1775–1858), French entomologist
- Manon Audinet (born 1992), French offshore sailor
- Philip Audinet (1766–1837), English line-engraver
