= Sport in the Czech Republic =

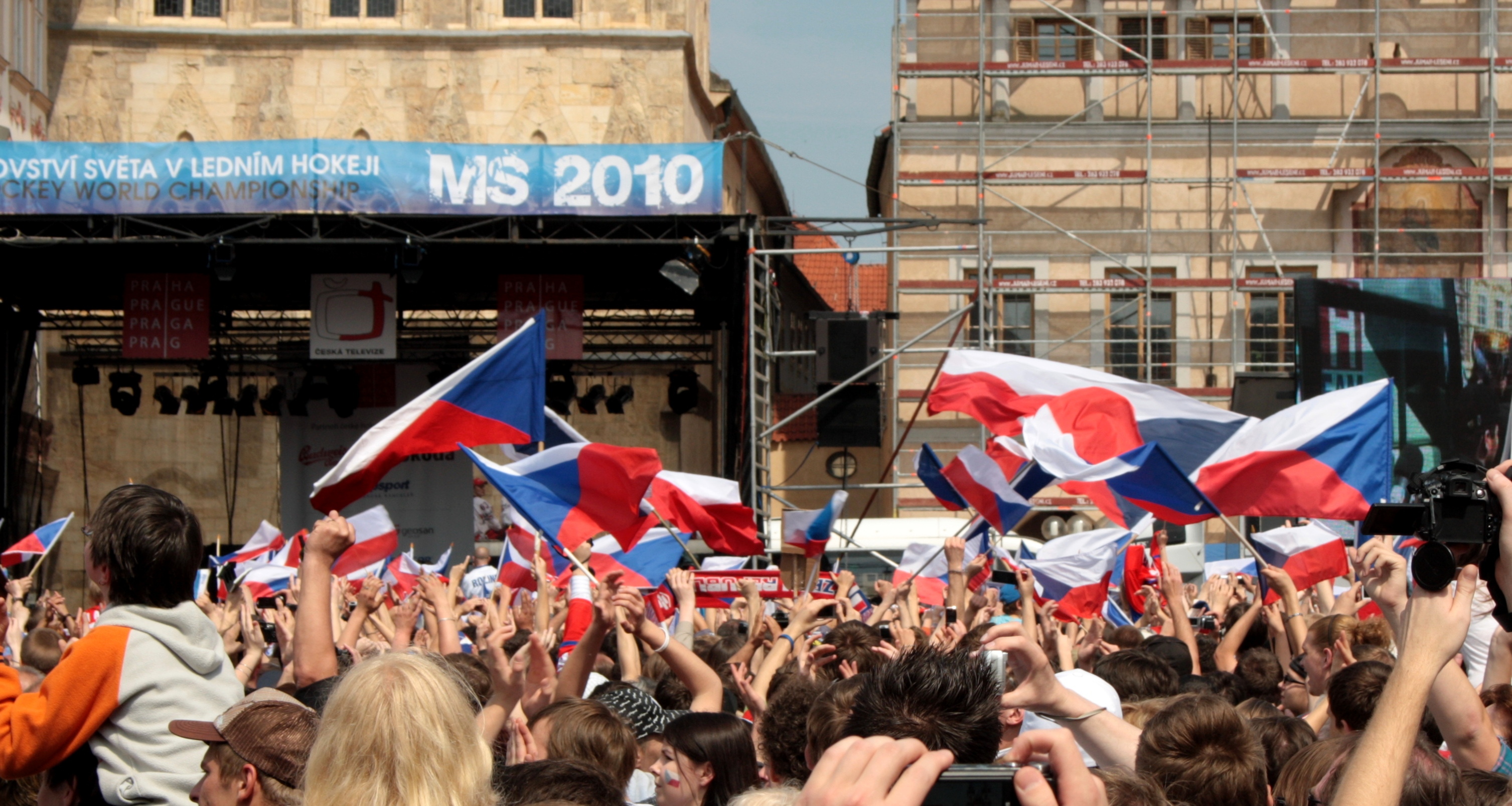
Arrival of the ice hockey world champions at Old Town Square (2010)

Sports play a significant part in the life of many Czechs who are generally loyal supporters of their favourite teams or individuals.

The two leading sports in the Czech Republic are football and ice hockey, both of which draw the largest attention of both the media and supporters. The many other sports with professional leagues and structures include basketball, volleyball, team handball, Czech handball, athletics, floorball and others. Sport is a source of strong waves of patriotism, usually rising several days or weeks before an event and sinking several days after.

The events considered the most important by Czech fans are: the Ice Hockey World Championship, the Olympic ice hockey tournament, the European football championship, the football World Cup and qualification matches for such events. In general, any international match involving the Czech ice hockey or football national team draws attention, especially when played against a traditional rival: Germany in football; Russia, Finland, Sweden, and Canada in ice hockey; and Slovakia in both. Summer and winter Olympic games are also both very popular.

== Ice hockey ==
Ice hockey is one of the most popular sports in the Czech Republic.

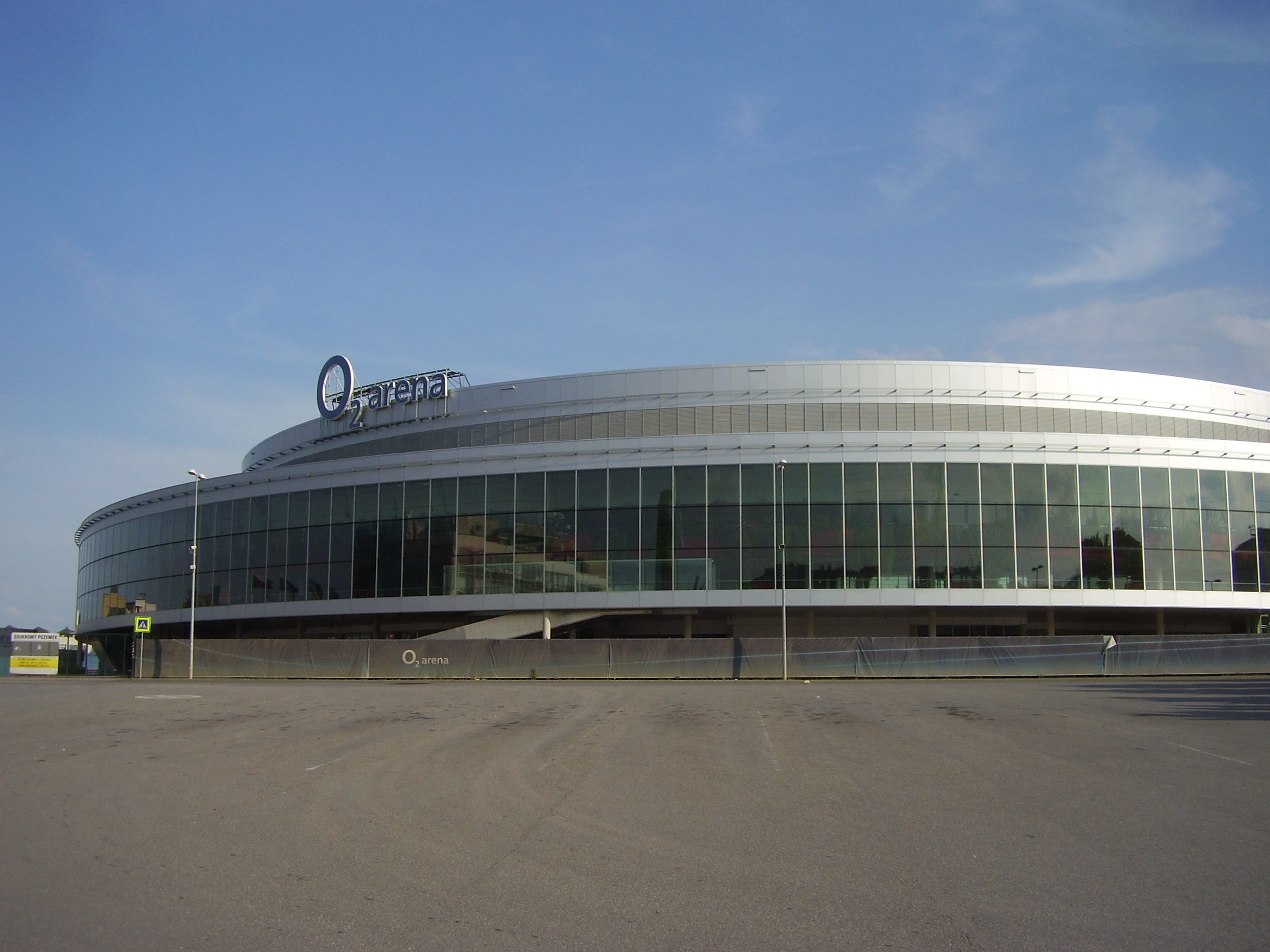
O2 Arena in Prague, which hosted the Ice Hockey World Championships in 2004, 2015, and 2024

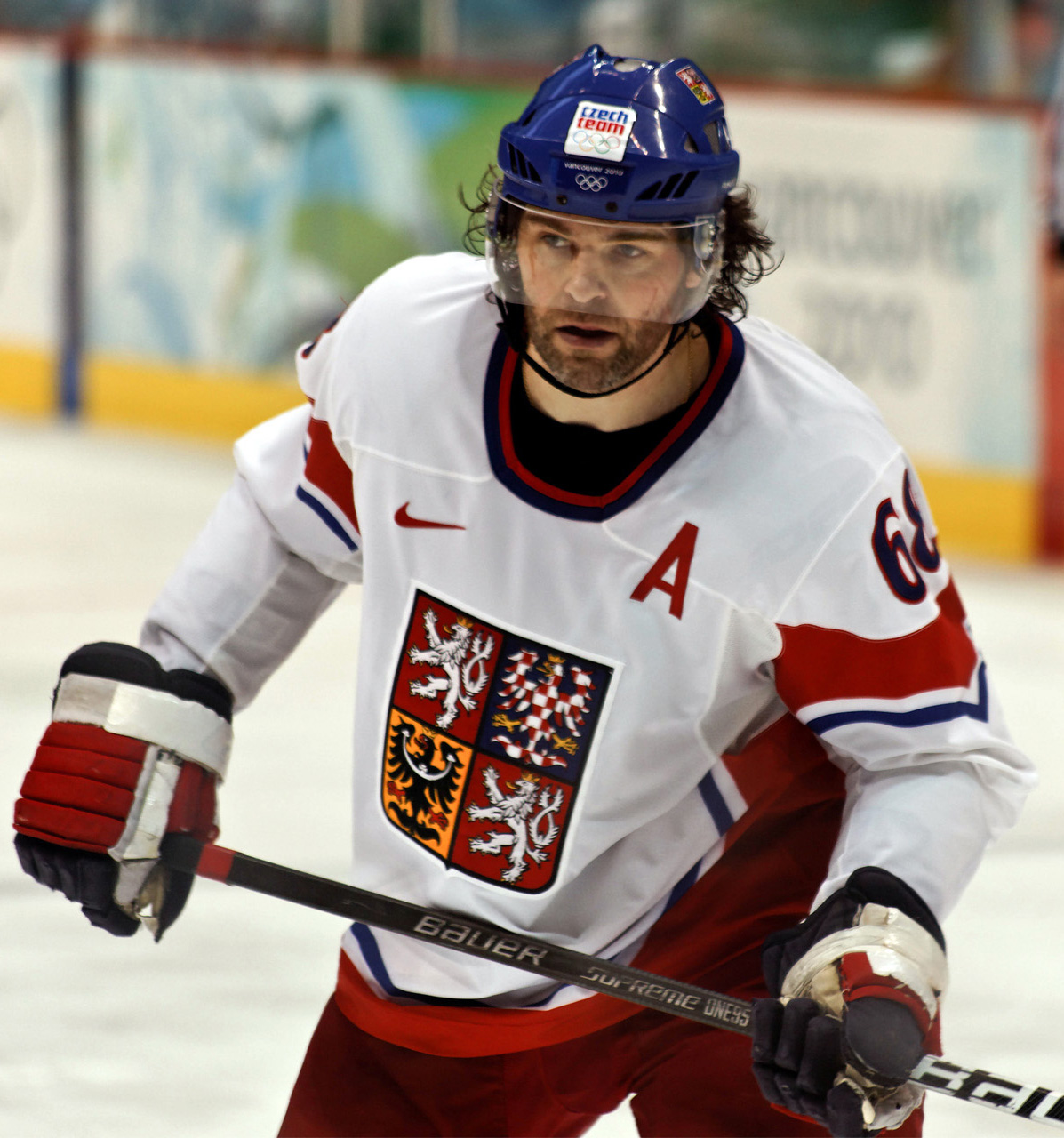
Jaromír Jágr is the leading point scorer among active NHL players

=== The Czech men's national team ===
The Czech national team is one of the top teams in the world, regularly competing in the World Championship, the Winter Olympic Games and the Euro Hockey Tour. The national team captured their first Olympic gold at the 1998 Winter Games in Nagano. From 1996 to 2001, the Czech Republic won six World Championship medals, including three consecutive gold from 1999 to 2001. Prominent Czech players include Jaromír Jágr, Dominik Hašek, Patrik Eliáš, Tomáš Plekanec, Aleš Hemský, Tomáš Kaberle, Milan Michálek and Robert Lang, who captained the 2006 Olympic team to a bronze medal. The team last won gold at the 2024 Men's World Ice Hockey Championships.

=== Extraliga ===
The Extraliga is the highest ranking ice hockey competition in the Czech Republic. The league comprises 14 teams and usually runs from September to April.

=== KHL ===
The team HC Lev Praha played two seasons in the Kontinental Hockey League (KHL) league, beginning with the 2012–13 season. The team qualified for the playoffs, but was eliminated by HC CSKA Moscow. In the 2013–2014 season they reached the final, where they lost the Gagarin Cup to Metallurg Magnitogorsk.

== Football ==
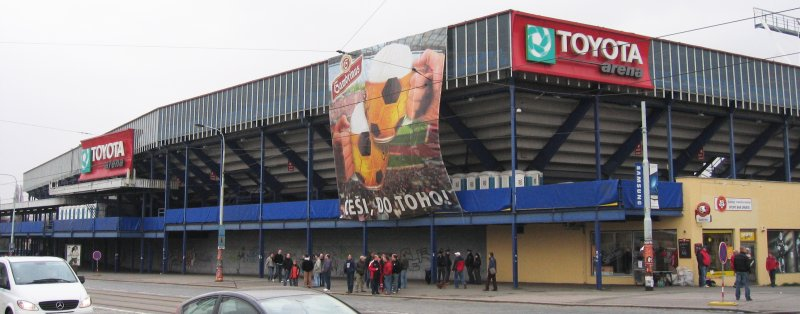
Generali Arena, home of AC Sparta Prague

Football has been a popular sport amongst the locals. Previously the old Czechoslovakia team were a force to be reckoned with, finishing runners-up twice in the World Cup and winning UEFA Euro 1976. Czech football history includes several world-renowned footballers, such as Antonín Panenka, Josef Bican, Josef Masopust, and Ivo Viktor. The sport gained even more support when the national team qualified for their first World Cup since the break-up of Czechoslovakia. In the 2000s, players such as Petr Čech, Tomáš Rosický, Milan Baroš, and Pavel Nedvěd achieved great success at top European clubs and became national icons.

In domestic football, the Czech First League is the top-level in the Czech football league system. Domestically, AC Sparta Prague (38 titles), SK Slavia Prague (21 titles), and FK Dukla Prague (11 titles) have been the most successful. For a long time Czech teams have supplied the national team and other top-level teams globally with players, including Libor Sionko, Jaromír Blažek, Zdeněk Grygera, Tomáš Souček, and Patrik Schick.

== Floorball ==
Floorball became a very popular sport in the last two decades in the Czech Republic. Czech Floorball, which is officially the Czech floorball association and a member of IFF, was established in 1992. In 2023 it had more than 70,000 members. This places Czech Floorball in third position between Finland and Switzerland in number of members worldwide. Since 1996, when the first Men's World Floorball Championship took place, until 2023, the Czech Republic men's national floorball team have achieved two second place (2004 and 2022) and two third-place finishes. In the 2019 and 2021 Czech juniors won the gold medal in the U19 world championship in Halifax and Brno. The Superliga florbalu and Extraliga žen ve florbale are the highest Czech floorball leagues. Many Czechs also play floorball in their free time at an amateur level.

== American Football ==
The domestic league Czech League of American Football that features four levels of play and also a woman's division. The Czech Bowl is the final of the top league. The Prague Black Panthers, founded in 1991, have won 18 Czech league championships and has competed in European Football League. There is also a National team representing the country in international competition.

== Bandy ==
The national bandy team made its Bandy World Championship debut in 2016. In Nymburk an annual international rink bandy tournament was organised. In 2017 Federation of International Bandy decided to make it an official one. As of 2019, four teams are playing in the national rink bandy league. It is already decided that more will participate in 2019. A variety of rink bandy called short bandy has been invented in Czechia. In terms of licensed athletes, bandy is the second biggest winter sport in the world.

== Baseball ==
Baseball is growing in popularity but is still considered a minor sport. The Czech Republic hosted the 2009 Baseball World Cup. A few Czech have signed contracts and are now playing in Minor League Baseball. The Czech Republic was invited to compete in the qualifying round of the 2013 World Baseball Classic.

In September 2022, the Czech Republic made history by qualifying for the 2023 World Baseball Classic. At the 2023 World Baseball Classic the Czech Republic beat China in its opening game and finished 4th in its group, thus qualifying for the 2026 World Baseball Classic. Later in 2023, the Czech Republic hosted the 2023 European Baseball Championship. The Czech Republic finished 5th at the 2023 European Baseball Championship after losing its quarterfinal match to Great Britain, then beating Israel and France to secure its placing.

== Basketball ==
Basketball is a popular sport in the Czech Republic. The National Basketball League is the country's top division.

As the heir to the successful Czechoslovakia men's national basketball team, the Czech national team has at times struggled to meet expectations. Following independence in 1993, the Czech national team did not qualify for the FIBA Basketball World Cup until 2019.

Notable Czech players include Tomáš Satoranský, Jan Veselý, Jiří Welsch and George Zidek.

== Beach volleyball ==
The country featured national teams in beach volleyball that competed at the 2018–2020 CEV Beach Volleyball Continental Cup in both the women's and the men's sections.

== Cricket ==
Cricket has been played in the Czech Republic since 1997, however, as a sports body, joined the ICC International Cricket Council in 2000.

The Czech Cricket Union is the official governing body of the sport of cricket in Czech Republic. Its current headquarters is in Prague. The Czech Cricket Union is the Czech Republic's representative at the International Cricket Council and is an affiliate member. It is also a member of the European Cricket Council.

== Lacrosse ==
The Czech Republic has sent national teams to the World Lacrosse Championship, the World Lacrosse Women's World Championship and the Under-19 World Lacrosse Championships.

== Rugby union ==
Josef Rössler-Ořovský, who introduced a number of sports in the then Czechoslovakia, among others skiing and tennis, was originally credited with starting rugby union as well back in 1895. He went to England and brought back a rugby ball with him. Efforts were made to play the game at the Czech Yacht Club, but a public struggle ensued, and rugby subsequently never really caught on.

Czechoslovakia was a founder member of FIRA in 1934, and joined the IRB in 1988.

Currently, Brno in Moravia, and the capital Prague are considered to be the centres for Rugby Union in the country.

== Rugby league ==
Rugby league in the Czech Republic was started in 2006. The Czechs received government funding before a game was played there, and in their first game on August 5, 2006, in Prague, the Czechs went down 34–28 to the Netherlands.

In 2007 the Czech Republic took part in the European Shield tournament. This included two other 2nd tier nations; Germany and Serbia. Czech national team lost both their matches, v Germany 22–44 in Prague (4 August) and v Serbia 16–56 in Belgrade (18 August), and finished third.

In 2011, the Czech Rugby League Association became an affiliate member of the Rugby League European Federation after reforming its governance.

== Individual sports ==
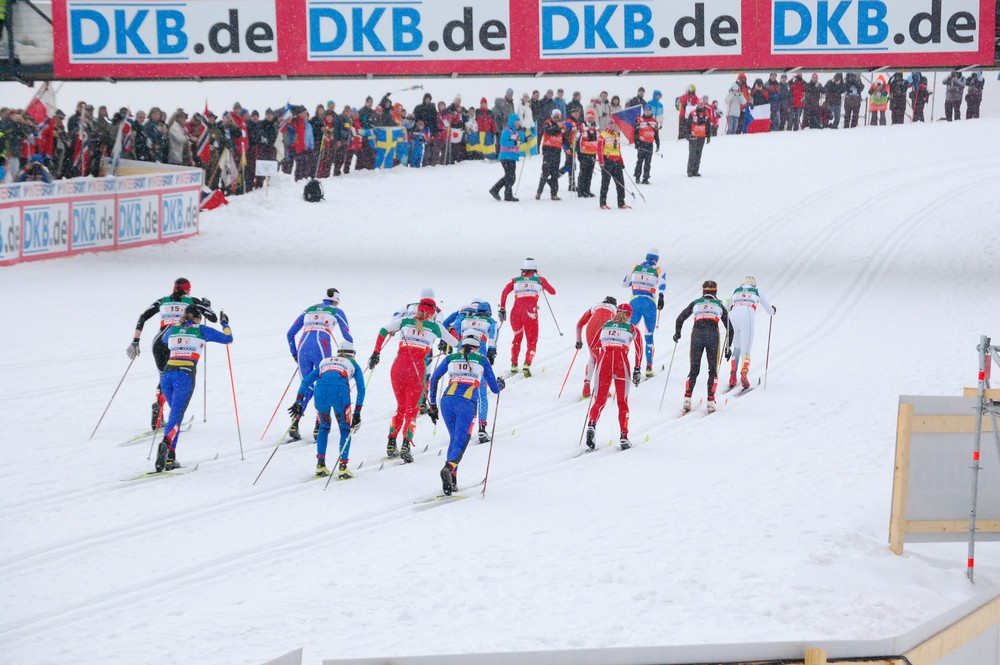
FIS Nordic World Ski Championships 2009 in Liberec

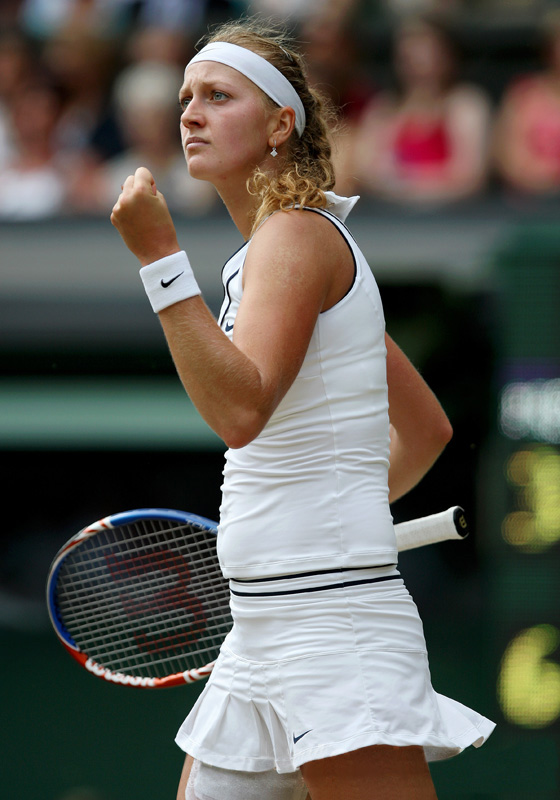
Petra Kvitová won Wimbledon in 2011 and 2014

Liberec (German: Reichenberg) hosted the FIL European Luge Championships in 1914 and 1939. The Czech Republic has twice hosted the ICF Canoe Sprint World Championships: Prague hosted the 1958 Championships and Račice hosted them in 2017. In 2009, Liberec hosted the FIS Nordic World Ski Championships and the Ski Jumping World Cup always comes here in January.

=== Athletics ===
The Czech Athletics Federation organises the annual Czech Athletics Championships, Czech Indoor Athletics Championships and Czech Republic Marathon Championships. Regular athletics meetings are held at the Josef Odložil Memorial in Prague, as well as the Golden Spike Ostrava. Half marathons are regularly run in cities including České Budějovice, Karlovy Vary, Olomouc, Prague, and Ústí nad Labem. Annual marathons are held in places including Kladno, Ostrava, and Prague.

=== Figure skating ===
Tomáš Verner is the 2008 European champion, a medalist at two other European Championships (2007 silver, 2011 bronze), and a ten-time (2002–2004, 2006–2008, 2011–2014) Czech national champion. He has won six senior Grand Prix medals, including the 2010 Cup of Russia title. He has represented the Czech Republic at the 2006, 2010 and 2014 Winter Olympics. He has qualified for the Grand Prix Final three times (2008, 2009 and 2010). His highest placement in the World Championships is fourth which he achieved twice in 2007 and 2009.

Michal Brezina has represented the Czech Republic at the 2010, 2014 and 2018 Winter Olympics. He is the 2013 European bronze medalist, 2011 Skate America champion, 2009 World Junior silver medalist, and four-time Czech national champion. He is also the winner of the 2014-15 ISU Challenger Series. He has qualified for the Grand Prix Final twice (2011 and 2018). His younger sister, Eliška Březinová, competes in ladies' single skating.

=== Horse racing ===
Among the most famous horse races in the country are the Velká pardubická in Pardubice, as well as the Czech Triple Crown of flat racing, which takes place at Prague-Velká Chuchle Racecourse.

=== Mixed Martial Arts ===
In 2022, Jiří Procházka became the Czech Republic's first UFC Champion after defeating Glover Teixeira for the Light Heavyweight title at UFC 275.

Other notable mixed martial artists from the Czech Republic include Karlos Vemola, Viktor Pešta, David Dvořák and Lucie Pudilová.

=== Motorcycle racing ===
==== Grand Prix ====
The Czech Republic motorcycle Grand Prix has been held at the Brno Circuit in Brno, since 1965, with a hiatus between 1982 and 1987, as well as between 2020 and 2025.

==== Motocross ====
Since 1995 the West Bohemian town of Loket has hosted a round of the Motocross World Championship in late July or early August every year.

==== Speedway and Longtrack ====
Speedway has been run as a league system since 1956, with the winner crowned champion of the country when winning the Czech Republic Team Speedway Championship.

The Markéta Stadium in Prague has hosted the Speedway Grand Prix of Czech Republic since 1997. Other major venues include the Svítkov Stadium, Slaný Speedway Stadium and Speedway Stadium Plzeň.

Longtrack racing has always had a major following in the country. The home of longtrack is Mariánské Lázně Longtrack Speedway, which is about two hours west of Prague. It hosts both domestic and international meetings and had held many of the World Championship finals and Grand-Prix rounds.

The most successful riders to have competed in the sport are Jiří Štancl (12 times Czech champion), Aleš Dryml Sr. (twice World longtrack silver medallist) and Václav Milík Jr. (8 times Czech champion).

=== Shooting sports ===
Sport shooting is the third most widespread sport in the Czech Republic. Among notable shooters is Kateřina Emmons, who won the gold in 2008 Summer Olympics.

=== Skiing and snowboarding ===
The Czech Republic has produced a number of successful competitors in various skiing disciplines in recent years. Šárka Záhrobská has been a successful alpine skier, specialising in the slalom. She has won four World Championship medals in the discipline: a gold in 2007, a silver in 2009 and bronzes in 2005 and 2015. She also won a bronze in the slalom at the 2010 Winter Olympics.

At the 2018 Winter Olympics, Ester Ledecká won the gold medal in the super-G. Ledecká also took another gold at the same Games in the snowboard parallel giant slalom, becoming the first woman to take gold medals in two different sports at the Winter Olympics. She also took Snowboarding World Championship golds in parallel slalom in 2015 and in parallel giant slalom in 2017. Ledecká also won the overall parallel and parallel giant slalom World Cup titles in 2015-16 and took another overall parallel World Cup in 2016-17. Eva Samková won the gold medal in the snowboard cross at the 2014 Winter Olympics and was World Cup snowboard cross champion in 2016-17. Šárka Pančochová took the overall freestyle and slopestyle World Cup titles in the 2013-14 season.

In cross-country skiing Kateřina Neumannová and Lukáš Bauer have enjoyed success. Neumannová won a gold medal in the 30 kilometre freestyle event at the 2006 Winter Olympics, as well as two World Championships in the 10 kilometre race in 2005 and 2007. She also won 18 races in the FIS Cross-Country World Cup. Bauer won the overall and distance World Cups in the 2007–08 seasons, as well as a silver and two bronze medals at the 2006 and 2010 Winter Olympics, and a silver in the 15 kilometre classical event at the 2009 World Championships. He is also a double winner of the Tour de Ski in 2008 and 2010.

In the sport of Biathlon World Championship golds have been won by Kateřina Holubcová (in the 15 kilometre individual event in 2003) and Roman Dostál (in the 20 kilometre individual in 2005). More recently Gabriela Soukalová enjoyed a breakthrough season in 2012–13, scoring four World Cup wins. She subsequently took gold medals at the 2015 World Championships as part of the Czech mixed relay team, and at the 2017 Worlds in the sprint. She was also overall World Cup champion in 2015-16. Markéta Davidová became World Champion in the individual in 2021.

=== Tennis ===
The Czech Republic hosts a number of tennis events each year, the most notable of which is the WTA Prague Open, which has WTA International status since 2015. The Czech Open in Prostějov, the Prosperita Open in Ostrava and the Prague Open are part of the ATP Challenger Tour, while the Prague Open is also part of the ITF Women's Circuit.

The Czech Republic Davis Cup team has won twice in 2012 and 2013, whereas the Czech Republic Fed Cup team has won six times in 2011, 2012, 2014, 2015, 2016 and 2018.

The best tennis players from the Czech Republic include Jaroslav Drobný, Ivan Lendl, Jan Kodeš, Petr Korda, Tomáš Berdych, Radek Štěpánek, Martina Navratilova, Hana Mandlíková, Helena Suková, Jana Novotná, Petra Kvitová, Karolína Plíšková, Lucie Šafářová, Barbora Krejčíková, Kateřina Siniaková and Markéta Vondroušová.

== Major sports facilities ==
Important Czech arenas and stadiums:

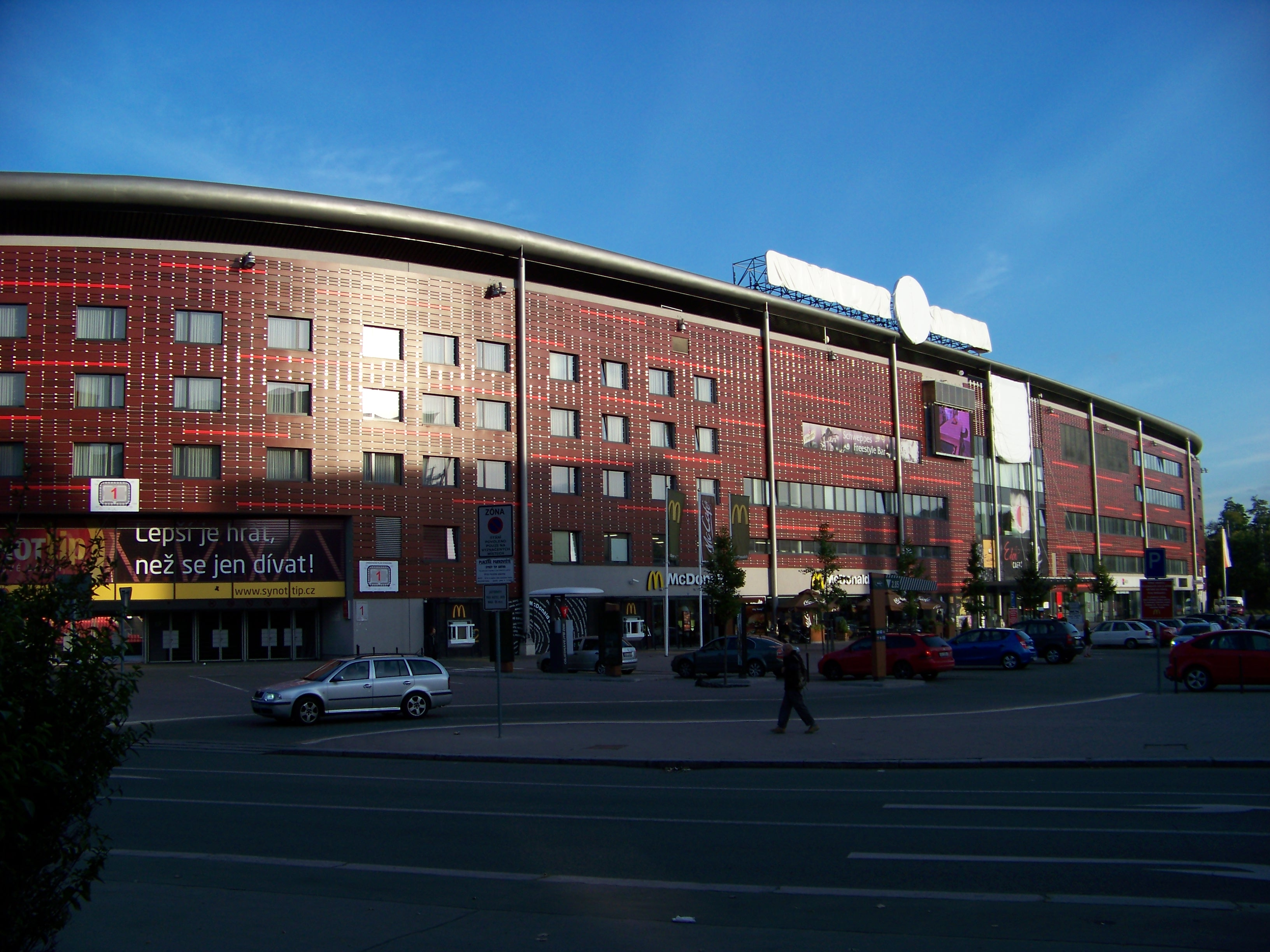
Eden Arena is the largest modern football stadium in the Czech Republic

=== Football ===
Eden Arena – Located in Prague's Vršovice district, it has a seated capacity of 20,800. It is the home stadium of football team SK Slavia Prague and opened in 2008.

Generali Arena – home to AC Sparta Prague, has a seated capacity of 19,416 and was opened in 1917 and rebuilt in 1994.

=== Ice hockey ===
O2 Arena – Located in the Libeň district of Prague, the O2 Arena is the largest Czech multi-functional hall. Its capacity is 18,000 seats. HC Sparta Praha play their games there.

Ostravar Aréna – Located in Ostrava and opened in 1986, the arena has hosted Ice Hockey World Championships three times: in 2004, 2015, and 2024.

Sportovní hala – former home to Sparta Praha, it has a seated capacity of 13,150 and opened in 1962. The venue hosted Ice Hockey World Championships on four occasions: in 1972, 1978, 1985 and 1992.

Štvanice Stadium – hosted the Ice Hockey World Championships on four occasions: 1933, 1938, 1947 and 1959. It opened in 1931 and hosted major events until they all moved to the Sportovní hala when it opened in 1962.

=== Tennis ===
Tennis area Štvanice – The compound located on Štvanice island in Prague has 14 outdoor courts and 10 indoor courts. Its centre court has a capacity of 8,000 and hosts ATP and WTA tournaments on an annual basis.

== The Olympic games ==
Prague put forward a bid to host the 2016 Summer Games in 2007, although the bid came to an end the following year when the city failed to make the shortlist.

== Youth sport ==
In 2014, just under 340,000 youths were registered with the Czech Union of Sport, representing a fall of more than a third since 1989's Velvet Revolution.

== See also ==
- Ministry of Education, Youth and Sports Czech Republic
