= Ivana Sekyrová =

Czech long-distance runner

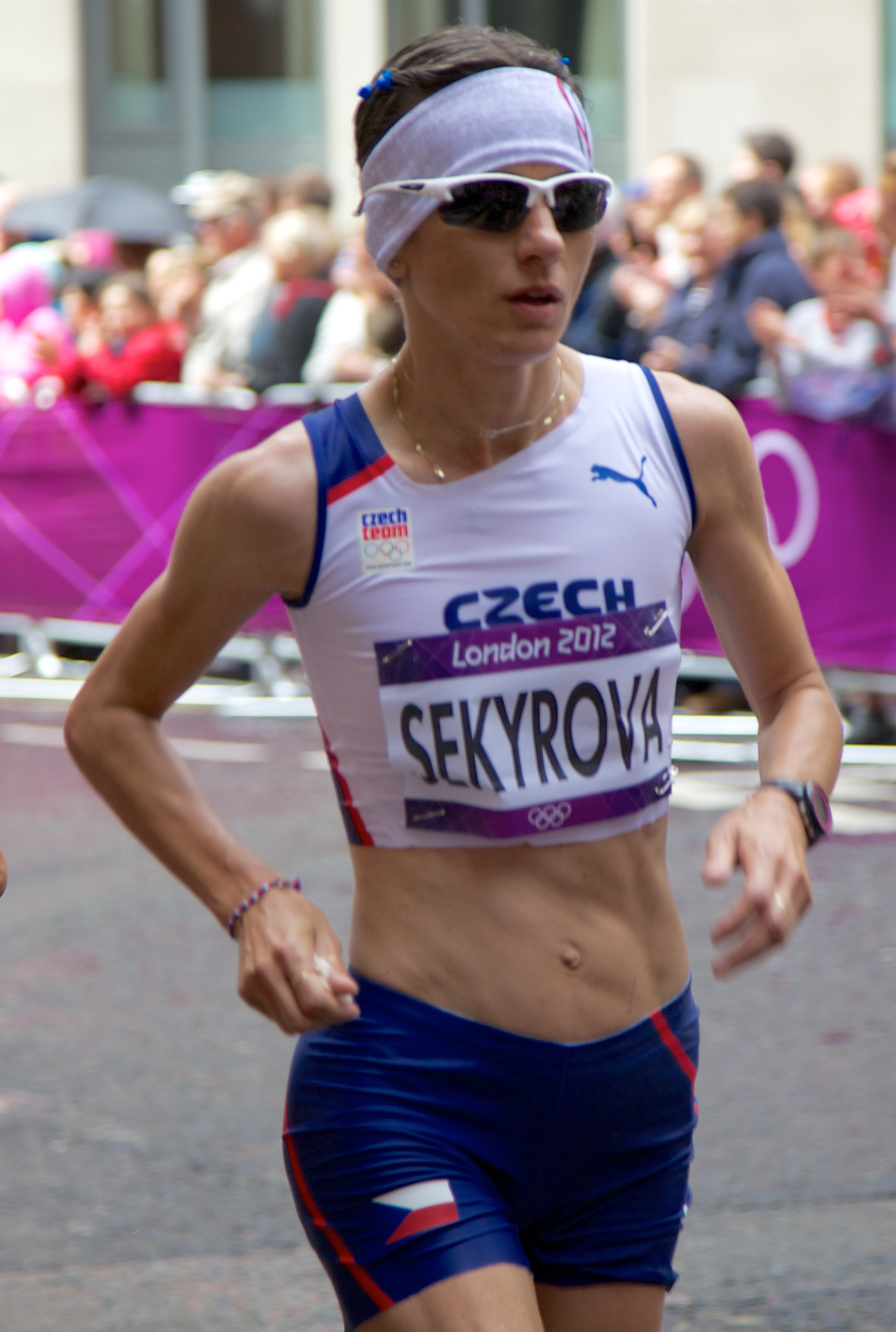
- Sekyrová at the 2012 Summer Olympics in London

Personal information
- Born: 13 October 1971 (age 54) Klatovy, Czechoslovakia
- Height: 1.72 m (5 ft 7 1/2 in)
- Weight: 51 kg (112 lb)

Sport
- Country: Czech Republic
- Sport: Athletics
- Event: Marathon

Ivana Sekyrová (Czech pronunciation: [ˈɪvana ˈsɛkɪrovaː], née Rubášová; born 13 October 1971) is a Czech long-distance runner. She represented her nation at the 2012 Summer Olympics in the women's marathon. She is the Czech national record holder in the one hour run. Sekyrová has also achieved success in other athletics events including the 400 metres hurdles, 10,000 metres and half marathon.

== Career ==
Sekyrová won her first two national championships gold medals in the 1990s, both in the 400 metres hurdles event. Her first victory, in Nitra, was at the last meeting of the Czechoslovak Athletics Championships in 1992. She followed that up with another win in the 1994 Czech Athletics Championships.

Sekyrová picked up second place in the one hour run event at the 2008 Golden Spike Ostrava meeting behind Ethiopian Dire Tune, who set a new world record in the event. Sekyrová's distance of 16,422 metres set a Czech national record.

In 2010, Sekyrová finished second in the 10,000 metres at the Czech Athletics Championships, 11 seconds behind winner Petra Kamínková. She won the 2010 Běchovice – Prague Race and defended her title in 2011 with a time of 36 minutes, 3 seconds.

In May 2012's Czech Athletics Championships held in Hradec Králové, Sekyrová won the national title in the women's 10,000 metres. She competed in the marathon at the 2012 Summer Olympics, placing 67th with a time of 2:37:14.

Sekyrová finished second behind Petra Pastorová at the 2013 Pardubice Viticultural Half Marathon, which served as the Czech national championship that year.

She won the Czech Women's Veteran Hill Running Championship in 2010, which was held in the Karlovy Vary Region, finishing 13th overall in a mixed field. In August 2011 she qualified for the 2011 World Mountain Running Championships.
