= Vohralík =

Vohralík, female Vohralíková, is a Czech surname. Notable people with the surname include:

- Karel Vohralík (1945–1998), Czech ice hockey player
- Václav Vohralík (1892–1985), Czech middle-distance runner
