= Kladno Marathon =

Annual race in Czechia since 2002

- Date: September
- Location: Kladno, Czech Republic
- Event type: Road
- Distance: Marathon
- Established: 2002 (24 years ago)
- Course records: Men's: 2:27:30 (2009) (Czech Republic) Mulugeta Serbessa; Women's: 2:51:42 (2008) (Czech Republic) Ivana Martincová
- Website: Kladno Marathon
- Participants: 142 finishers (2018); 84 finishers (2022)

The Kladno Marathon (Czech: Kladenský maratón) is an annual road marathon held in the city of Kladno in the Czech Republic each September. It was founded in 2002. Runners such as Vlastimil Zwiefelhofer have taken part in the race.

== History ==
The inaugural marathon was held in 2002. In 2020, a runner representing a running club from outside the Czech Republic won the race for the first time, as Italian Federico Bordignon won the men's race.

== Winners ==
Key:

Course record (in bold)

=== Marathon ===
Ed.	Year	Men's winner	Time	Women's winner	Time	Rf.
1	2002	Tomáš Ulma (CZE)	2:43:23	Martina Popovová (CZE)	3:40:38	
2	2003	Mulugeta Serbessa (CZE)	2:35:27	Martina Popovová (CZE)	3:43:16	
3	2004	Mulugeta Serbessa (CZE)	2:32:54	Iveta Kokešová (CZE)	3:36:44	
4	2005	Jiří Wallenfels (CZE)	2:39:47	Simona Koščová (CZE)	3:31:07	
5	2006	Daniel Orálek (CZE)	2:34:34	Jiřina Kociánová (CZE)	3:10:32	
6	2007	Ervin Idris Beshir (CZE)	2:43:40	Ivana Ducháčková (CZE)	3:13:17	
7	2008	Miloš Fiala (CZE)	2:34:46	Ivana Martincová (CZE)	**2:51:42**	
8	2009	Mulugeta Serbessa (CZE)	**2:27:30**	Jiřina Kociánová (CZE)	3:08:14	
9	2010	Mulugeta Serbessa (CZE)	2:28:21	Michaela Dimitriadu (CZE)	2:57:58	
10	2011	Mulugeta Serbessa (CZE)	2:30:28	Alena Krcháková (CZE)	3:17:56	
11	2012	Antonín Klika (CZE)	2:41:00	Petra Krejčová (CZE)	2:59:27	
12	2013	Petr Minařík (CZE)	2:41:14	Regina Procházková (CZE)	3:12:47	
13	2014	Mulugeta Serbessa (CZE)	2:35:45	Ivana Jedličková (CZE)	3:14:44	
14	2015	Zdeněk Neruda (CZE)	2:42:32	Michaela Dimitriadu (CZE)	3:08:11	
15	2016	Jakub Hurych (CZE)	2:47:51	Michaela Dimitriadu (CZE)	3:23:13	
16	2017	Petr Hasoň (CZE)	2:44:43	Jana Zímová (CZE)	3:16:24	
17	2018	Jan Sokol (CZE)	2:44:20	Michaela Dimitriadu (CZE)	3:02:57	
18	2019	Libor Eremka (CZE)	2:37:19	Dominika Miskovič (CZE)	3:19:20	
19	2020	Federico Bordignon (ITA)	2:36:41	Lenka Koubková (CZE)	3:00:29	
20	2021	Radek Brunner (CZE)	2:43:58	Radka Churáňová (CZE)	3:01:29	
21	2022	Karel Splítek (CZE)	2:31:54	Lenka Koubková (CZE)	2:54:23	

=== Multiple wins ===
Athlete	Wins	Category	Years
Mulugeta Serbessa (CZE)	6	Men's	2003, 2004, 2009, 2010, 2011, 2014
Michaela Dimitriadu (CZE)	4	Women's	2010, 2015, 2016, 2018
Martina Popovová (CZE)	2	Women's	2002, 2003
Jiřina Kociánová (CZE)	2	Women's	2006, 2009
Lenka Koubková (CZE)	2	Women's	2020, 2022
