= Zwiefelhofer =

Zwiefelhofer is a surname. Notable people with the surname include:

- Hans Zwiefelhofer (1932–2008), German priest and theologian
- Thomas Zwiefelhofer (born 1969), Liechtenstein politician
- Vlastimil Zwiefelhofer (born 1952), Czech long-distance runner
