= Theofiel Roekaert =

Belgian middle-distance runner

Personal information
- Nationality: Belgian
- Born: 6 February 1896

Sport
- Sport: Middle-distance running
- Event: 1500 metres

Theofiel Roekaert (born 6 February 1896, date of death unknown) was a Belgian middle-distance runner. He competed in the men's 1500 metres at the 1920 Summer Olympics.
