= Tommy Town =

Canadian athlete

Personal information
- Nationality: Canadian
- Born: 7 April 1893
- Died: 29 March 1957 (aged 63)

Sport
- Sport: Middle-distance running
- Event: 1500 metres

Tommy Town (7 April 1893 – 29 March 1957) was a Canadian middle-distance runner. He competed in the men's 1500 metres at the 1920 Summer Olympics.
