= Lucien Bangels =

Belgian middle-distance runner

Personal information
- Nationality: Belgian
- Born: 2 January 1899 Landen, Belgium
- Died: 20 December 1951 (aged 52) Sint-Truiden, Belgium

Sport
- Sport: Middle-distance running
- Event: 1500 metres

Antoine Pierre Lucien Bangels (2 January 1899 – 20 December 1951) was a Belgian middle-distance runner. He competed in the men's 1500 metres at the 1920 Summer Olympics. He died in a car accident.
