= Eivind Rasmussen =

Norwegian middle-distance runner

Personal information
- Nationality: Norwegian
- Born: 1 February 1894
- Died: 3 August 1977 (aged 83)

Sport
- Sport: Middle-distance running
- Event: 1500 metres

Eivind Rasmussen (1 February 1894 – 3 August 1977) was a Norwegian middle-distance runner. He competed in the men's 1500 metres at the 1920 Summer Olympics.
