= Juan Muguerza Cross-Country =

Running Event

- Date: January
- Location: Elgoibar, Gipuzkoa
- Event type: Cross country
- Distance: 9.707 km for men 7.621 km for women
- Established: 1943
- Website: Cross Juan Muguerza
- Participants: 104 finishers (2022); 113 (2020)

The Juan Muguerza Cross-Country, also known as the Elgoibar Cross-Country, is an annual cross country running competition which takes place each January in Elgoibar, the Basque Country, Spain. It is named as a memorial of local runner Juan Muguerza, a multiple national champion who was killed in 1937 during the bombing of Mungia in the Spanish Civil War.

The competition was first held in 1943 and was a men-only contest, principally between national-level runners. This changed at the 20th anniversary of the race in 1963, when the competition became an international one. Ethiopian runner Mamo Wolde was the first foreign winner and he went on to score three more victories that decade. His performances brought exposure for African runners in Spain and his influence was recognised with the erection of a memorial in his memory in 2003. Having been held every year since 1943, with the exception of cancellations in 1950 and 1981, the Cross Juan Muguerza is one of the longest-running competitions of its type in Spain.

The men's race has typically been contested over distances varying from 9 km to 11 km, with the current race being 10.8 km. A women's short course race was trialled in the late 1960s and became a permanent fixture of the programme in 1972. Initially a two kilometre course, the distance was gradually increased over the lifespan of the competition, resulting in the current distance of 6.6 km. A men's junior race was held in addition to the main senior race in 1963. The current race programme comprises the two senior races and six different age categories for younger runners.

The elite events attract the highest level of international runners, with past winners including IAAF World Cross Country Championships gold medallists Kenenisa Bekele, Paul Tergat, John Ngugi, Derartu Tulu and Edith Masai. The top runners of Spain and Portugal regularly compete at the competition. Among them, world medallists Mariano Haro and Carmen Valero won in Elgoibar in the 1970s, while prominent Portuguese athletes Paulo Guerra and Fernanda Ribeiro took the top honours in the 1990s.

== Past senior race winners ==
=== National era ===
Edition	Year	Winner
1st	1943	Prudencio Ayerra (ESP)
2nd	1944	Joaquín Escudero (ESP)
3rd	1945	José M Garín (ESP)
4th	1946	Joaquín Escudero (ESP)
5th	1947	Simón Aldazábal (ESP)
6th	1948	Simón Aldazábal (ESP)
7th	1949	Simón Aldazábal (ESP)
—	1950	Not held
8th	1951	Francisco Irízar (ESP)
9th	1952	Francisco Irízar (ESP)
10th	1953	Lucas Larraza (ESP)
11th	1954	Francisco Irízar (ESP)
12th	1955	Lucas Larraza (ESP)
13th	1956	Lucas Larraza (ESP)
14th	1957	Lucas Larraza (ESP)
15th	1958	Benito Aldai (ESP)
16th	1959	Joaquín Escudero (ESP)
17th	1960	Benito Aldai (ESP)
18th	1961	Fernando Aguilar (ESP)
19th	1962	José A Azpiroz (ESP)

=== International era ===
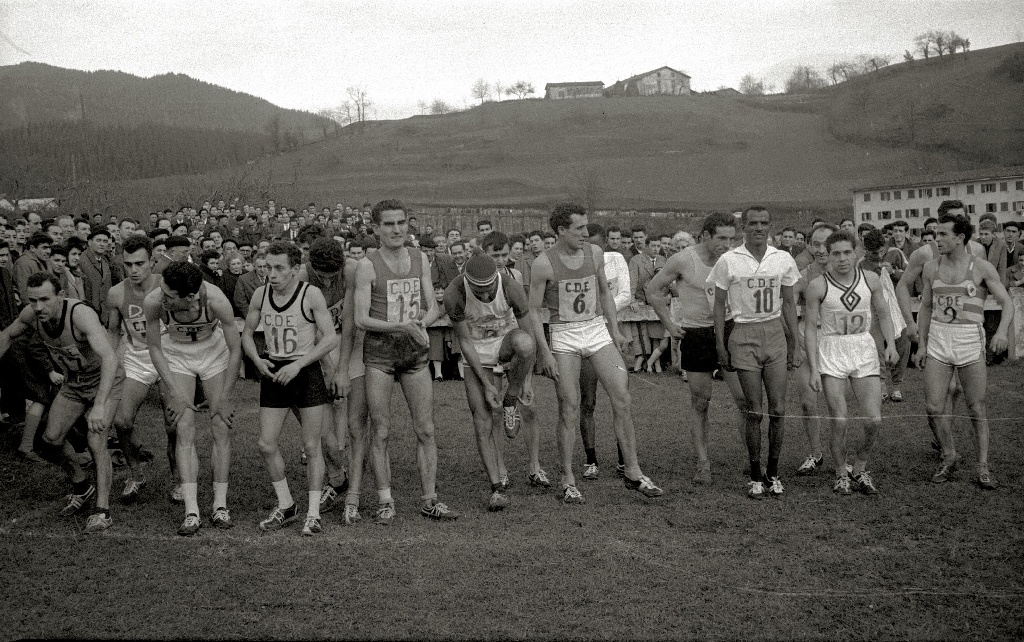
1963 edition. Mamo Wolde wears number 10.

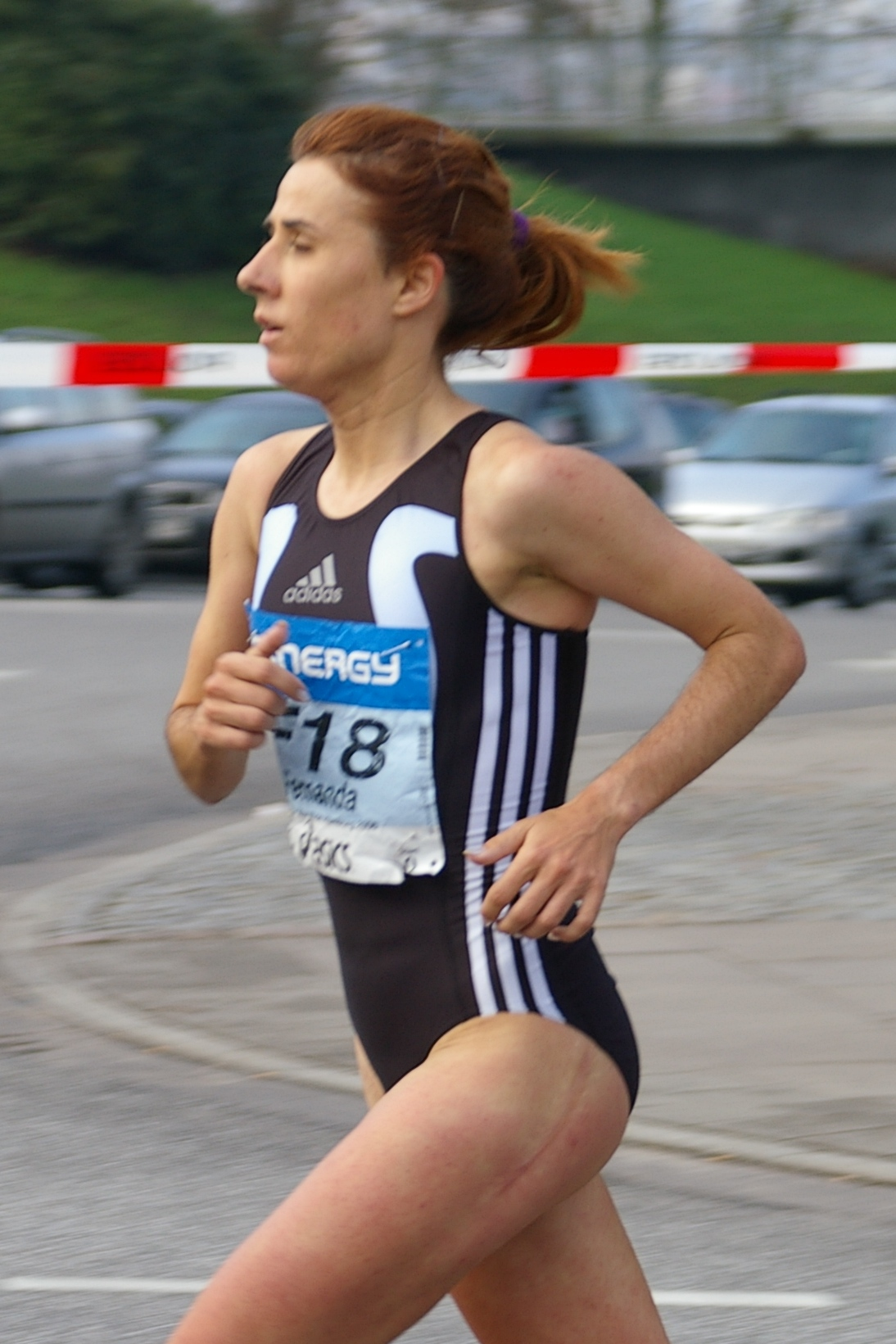
Olympic champion Fernanda Ribeiro took the top honours in 1995.

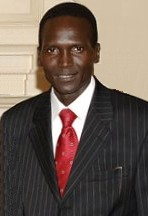
Five-time world champion Paul Tergat was the 1999 winner.

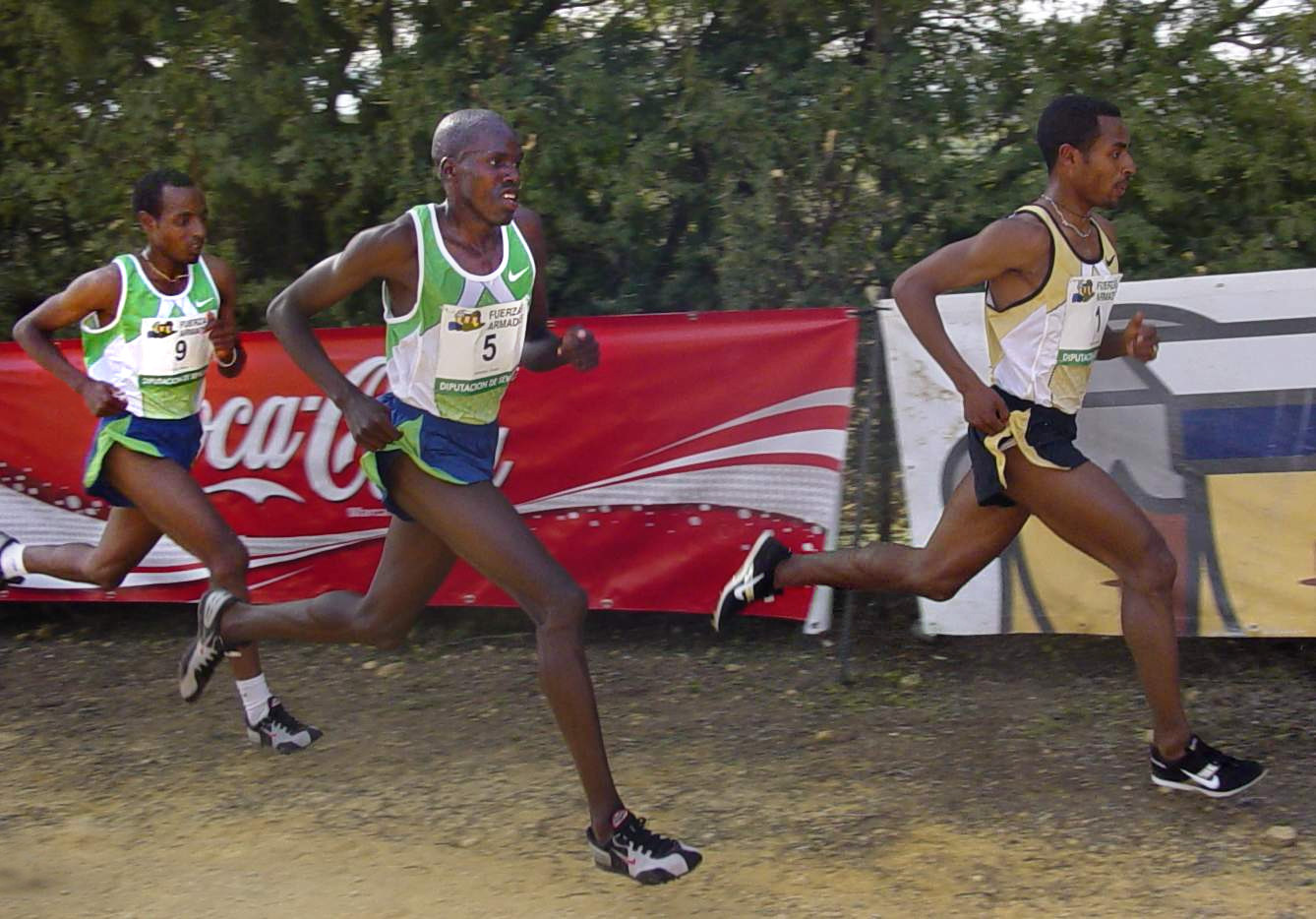
(L–R) Tariku Bekele, Abraham Chebii and Kenenisa Bekele have all won the men's race.

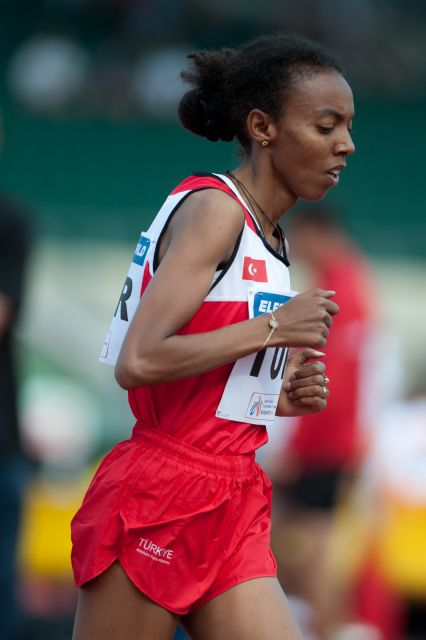
Elvan Abeylegesse was the 2004 women's winner.

Edition	Year	Men's winner	Time (m:s)	Women's winner	Time (m:s)
20th	1963	Mamo Wolde (ETH)		Not held	
21st	1964	Mamo Wolde (ETH)		Not held	
22nd	1965	Melvyn Batty (GBR)		Not held	
23rd	1966	Roy Fowler (GBR)		Not held	
24th	1967	Mamo Wolde (ETH)		Coro Fuentes (ESP)	
25th	1968	Mamo Wolde (ETH)		Belén Azpeitia (ESP)	
26th	1969	Lachie Stewart (GBR)		Not held	
27th	1970	Lachie Stewart (GBR)		Not held	
28th	1971	Mariano Haro (ESP)		Not held	
29th	1972	Lachie Stewart (GBR)		Belén Azpeitia (ESP)	
30th	1973	Mariano Haro (ESP)	30:40	Belén Azpeitia (ESP)	
31st	1974	Jouko Kuha (FIN)		Belén Azpeitia (ESP)	
32nd	1975	Fernando Cerrada (ESP)		Belén Azpeitia (ESP)	
33rd	1976	Mariano Haro (ESP)	26:27	Belén Azpeitia (ESP)	
34th	1977	Mariano Haro (ESP)	32:02	Montserrat Abelló (ESP)	
35th	1978	Mariano Haro (ESP)	30:24	Carmen Valero (ESP)	
36th	1979	Mike McLeod (GBR)	30:12	Pilar Fernández (ESP)	
37th	1980	John Wild (GBR)		Leila Boudina (ALG)	
—	1981	Cancelled			
39th	1982	Carlos Lopes (POR)		Amelia Lorza (ESP)	
40th	1983	Antonio Prieto (ESP)		Amelia Lorza (ESP)	
41st	1984	Jorge García (ESP)		Asunción Antolín (ESP)	
42nd	1985	Ezequiel Canário (POR)		Amelia Lorza (ESP)	
43rd	1986	Steve Jones (GBR)		Jane Shields (GBR)	
44th	1987	Paul Kipkoech (KEN)	29:37	Ana Isabel Alonso (ESP)	
45th	1988	John Ngugi (KEN)	29:16	Ana Isabel Alonso (ESP)	
46th	1989	Antonio Serrano (ESP)		Ana Isabel Alonso (ESP)	
47th	1990	Kipyego Kororia (KEN)	30:32	Marcianne Mukamurenzi (RWA)	
48th	1991	Eamonn Martin (GBR)	29:33	Susan Sirma (KEN)	13:43
49th	1992	Wilson Omwoyo (KEN)	33:44	Hellen Kimaiyo (KEN)	17:12
50th	1993	Fita Bayisa (ETH)	29:38	Luchia Yishak (ETH)	17:01
51st	1994	Addis Abebe (ETH)	34:30	Hellen Kimaiyo (KEN)	19:01
52nd	1995	Brahim Lahlafi (MAR)	34:38	Fernanda Ribeiro (POR)	19:28
53rd	1996	Paulo Guerra (POR)	31:04	Derartu Tulu (ETH)	17:24
54th	1997	Jon Brown (GBR)	32:09	Julia Vaquero (ESP)	17:37
55th	1998	Paul Koech (KEN)	32:16	Kutre Dulecha (ETH)	18:05
56th	1999	Paul Tergat (KEN)	31:23	Genet Gebregiorgis (ETH)	17:34
57th	2000	Sammy Kipketer (KEN)	30:05	Yimenashu Taye (ETH)	17:21
58th	2001	Abraham Chebii (KEN)	31:56	Sally Barsosio (KEN)	17:47
59th	2002	Abraham Chebii (KEN)	31:53	Anne Jelagat (KEN)	22:05
60th	2003	Kenenisa Bekele (ETH)	30:58	Edith Masai (KEN)	20:45
61st	2004	Abraham Chebii (KEN)	30:14	Elvan Abeylegesse (TUR)	20:39
62nd	2005	Tariku Bekele (ETH)	32:02	Alice Timbilil (KEN)	22:20
63rd	2006	Charles Kamathi (KEN)	32:23	Workitu Ayanu (ETH)	22:19
64th	2007	Sileshi Sihine (ETH)	31:08	Mestawet Tufa (ETH)	20:37
65th	2008	Leonard Komon (KEN)	31:54	Priscah Cherono (KEN)	21:19
66th	2009	Ayele Abshero (ETH)	31:18	Florence Kiplagat (KEN)	21:39
67th	2010	Leonard Komon (KEN)	32:44	Frehiwat Goshu (ETH)	22:37
68th	2011	Leonard Komon (KEN)	32:05	Sara Moreira (POR)	22:08
69th	2012	Paul Tanui (KEN)	32:25	Wude Ayalew (ETH)	22:29
70th	2013	Conseslus Kipruto (KEN)	33:15	Gelete Burka (ETH)	22:53
71st	2014	Timothy Toroitich (UGA)	32:04	Hiwot Ayalew (ETH)	21:59
72nd	2015	Teklemariam Medhin (ERI)	33:02	Mimi Belete (BHR)	22:09
73rd	2016	Aweke Ayalew (BHR)	32:05	Irene Cheptai (KEN)	24:49
74th	2017	Joshua Cheptegei (UGA)	31:50	Senbere Teferi (ETH)	25:10
75th	2018	Selemon Barega (ETH)	33:54	Ruth Jebet (BHR)	27:15
76th	2019	Rhonex Kipruto (KEN)	32:05	Hellen Obiri (KEN)	24:38
77th	2020	Tadese Worku (ETH)	31:39	Hellen Obiri (KEN)	25:10
78th	2022	Nicholas Kimeli (KEN)	33:47	Edinah Jebitok (KEN)	26:03
79th	2023	Selemon Barega (ETH)	33:14	Rahel Daniel (ERI)	25:43
80th	2024	Berihu Aregawi (ETH)	30:34	Beatrice Chebet (KEN)	26:08
81st	2025	Berihu Aregawi (ETH)	29:36	Beatrice Chebet (KEN)	25:49
82nd	2026	Berihu Aregawi (ETH)	29:33	Winfred Yavi (BHR)	25:23

=== Winners by country ===
Country	Men's race	Women's race	Total
Kenya	18	14	32
Ethiopia	15	12	27
Spain	9	17	26
Great Britain	7	1	8
Portugal	3	2	5
Bahrain	1	3	4
Uganda	2	0	2
Algeria	0	1	1
Eritrea	1	1	2
Finland	1	0	1
Morocco	1	0	1
Rwanda	0	1	1
Turkey	0	1	1
