= Edward Lawrence (athlete) =

Canadian middle-distance runner

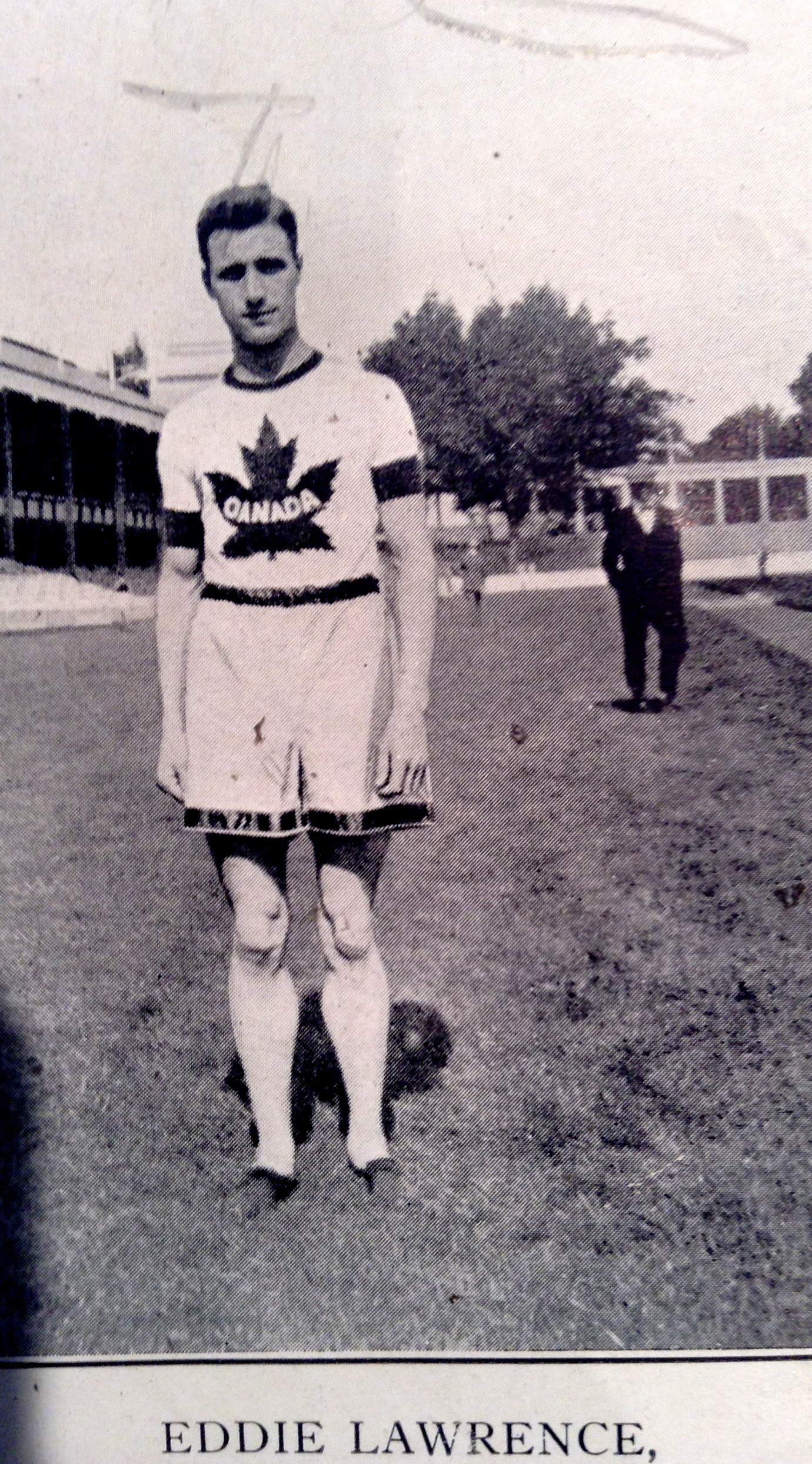

Personal information
- Nationality: Canadian
- Born: 26 January 1896 London, Great Britain
- Died: 21 May 1961 (aged 65) Montreal, Quebec, Canada

Sport
- Sport: Middle-distance running
- Event: 1500 metres

Edward Albert Lawrence (26 January 1896 – 21 May 1961) was a Canadian middle-distance runner. He competed in the men's 1500 metres at the 1920 Summer Olympics.
