= Edward Curtis (athlete) =

American middle-distance runner

Personal information
- Nationality: American
- Born: February 1, 1899
- Died: November 18, 1926 (aged 27)

Sport
- Sport: Middle-distance running
- Event: 1500 metres

Edward Curtis (February 1, 1899 – November 18, 1926) was an American middle-distance runner. He competed in the men's 1500 metres at the 1920 Summer Olympics.
