= Fritz Kiölling =

Swedish middle-distance runner

Personal information
- Nationality: Swedish
- Born: 3 March 1896 Bollnäs, Sweden
- Died: 3 June 1976 (aged 80) Ekerö, Sweden

Sport
- Sport: Middle-distance running
- Event: 1500 metres

Fritz Kiölling (3 March 1896 – 3 June 1976) was a Swedish middle-distance runner. He competed in the men's 1500 metres at the 1920 Summer Olympics.
