= Ostrava Marathon =

Annual race in Czechia since 1954

- Date: September
- Location: Ostrava, Czech Republic
- Event type: Road
- Distance: Marathon
- Established: 1954 (72 years ago)
- Course records: Men's: 2:19:06 (1959) (Czechoslovakia) Pavel Kantorek; Women's: 2:49:41 (2013) (Czech Republic) Šárka Macháčková
- Website: ostravacitymarathon.cz
- Participants: 193 starters (2022)

The Ostrava Marathon (Czech: Ostravský maraton) is an annual road marathon held in the city of Ostrava in the Czech Republic each September. It was first held in 1954.

== History ==
The inaugural marathon was held in 1954. On seven occasions (1956, 1958, 1960–62, and 1964–65), the race distance was limited to 25 kilometres (16 mi). Between 1966 and 1973 the race was not held at all, due to the death of its original organiser, Slávek Mozga. It resumed in 1974. The race has functioned as the Czechoslovakia (later Czech Republic) national championship on five occasions; in 1996, women's race winner Kateřina Gerová-Šromová was not awarded the national title as there was only one entrant in the race. Women first ran the race in 1974, but took part only sporadically until 1986, since which there has only been one race (1997) without a recorded woman finisher.

== Other races ==
The Ostrava Marathon takes place alongside a variety of other running distances including a half marathon and quarter marathon (10.5 kilometres (6.5 mi)).

== Winners ==
The race has been won a record 8 times by Ethiopian-born Czech runner Mulugeta Serbessa, who took victories in 2001, 2002, 2003, 2004, 2009, 2011, 2013, and 2014. Pavel Kantorek set the course record of 2:19:06 in 1959. Czech, and formerly Czechoslovak, runners have dominated the race, with only a few other European nationalities coming in first place. Kazimierz Orzeł of Poland and Sigrun Macheleidt of East Germany are the only foreign race winners with multiple successes (two each). The most successful female runner is Petra Pastorová, who won the event six consecutive years from 2017 to 2022.

Key:

Course record (in bold)
National championship race

=== Marathon ===
Ed.	Year	Men's winner	Time	Women's winner	Time	Rf.
1	1954	Jaroslav Šourek (TCH)	2:32:49			
2	1955	Walter Bednář (TCH)	2:28:38			
3	1956					
4	1957	Jaroslav Šourek (TCH)	2:34:36			
5	1958					
6	1959	Pavel Kantorek (TCH)	**2:19:06**			
7	1960					
8	1961					
9	1962					
10	1963	Václav Chudomel (TCH)	2:40:23			
11	1964					
12	1965					
—	—	Not held between 1966 and 1973				
13	1974	Stanislav Nebojsa (TCH)	2:48:21	Emilie Přivřelová (TCH)	3:26:04	
14	1975	Kazimierz Orzeł (POL)	2:36:10			
15	1976	Kazimierz Orzeł (POL)	2:43:13			
16	1977	Volker Lorenz (DDR)	2:39:36			
17	1978	Tomáš Rusek (TCH)	2:34:52			
18	1979	Endre Mocsari (HUN)	2:29:41	Eva Vlčková (TCH)	4:10:52	
19	1980	Vojtěch Krejčí (TCH)	2:31:03	Sigrun Macheleidt (DDR)	3:34:47	
20	1981	Vojtěch Krejčí (TCH)	2:27:06			
21	1982	Zdeněk Šváb (TCH)	2:31:53	Sigrun Macheleidt (DDR)	3:51:50	
22	1983	Jiří Brož (TCH)	2:29:57			
23	1984	Vladimír Balošák (TCH)	2:34:50	Sigrid Eichner (DDR)	3:27:38	
24	1985	Ondřej Němec (TCH)	2:28:46			
25	1986	Nikos Cametis (TCH)	2:30:24	Marie Vitásková (TCH)	3:24:51	
26	1987	Aleš Jaroň (TCH)	2:29:08	Ivana Brožová (TCH)	3:15:49	
27	1988	Miroslav Miko (TCH)	2:27:42	Věra Holaňová (TCH)	3:10:19	
28	1989	Josef Mladenka (TCH)	2:35:40	Ivana Brožová (TCH)	3:11:58	
29	1990	Jan Hrouza (TCH)	2:36:30	Lenka Skalová (TCH)	4:02:16	
30	1991	Miroslav Miko (TCH)	2:26:40	Ivana Brožová (TCH)	3:16:32	
31	1992	Jan Hrouza (TCH)	2:32:00	Alena Sladká (TCH)	3:08:30	
32	1993	Alexandr Neuwirth (CZE)	2:21:26	Věra Vašutová (CZE)	3:00:49	
33	1994	Alexandr Neuwirth (CZE)	2:20:50	Vlasta Rulcová (CZE)	2:57:55	
34	1995	Václav Filip (CZE)	2:31:56	Anna Balošáková (SVK)	2:56:25	
35	1996	Vlastimil Bukovjan (CZE)	2:22:48	Kateřina Gerová-Šromová (CZE)	3:29:47	
36	1997	Václav Filip (CZE)	2:40:01			
37	1998	Jiří Žák (CZE)	2:29:11	Zdeňka Tvrdá (CZE)	3:59:12	
38	1999	David Gerych (CZE)	2:34:30	Zdeňka Tvrdá (CZE)	3:53:31	
39	2000	Václav Ožana (CZE)	2:37:32	Lenka Skalová (CZE)	4:01:37	
40	2001	Mulugeta Serbessa (CZE)	2:29:57	Ludmila Šokalová (CZE)	3:24:45	
41	2002	Mulugeta Serbessa (CZE)	2:37:43	Ludmila Šokalová (CZE)	3:40:36	
42	2003	Mulugeta Serbessa (CZE)	2:35:57	Jaroslava Pokorová (CZE)	3:39:08	
43	2004	Mulugeta Serbessa (CZE)	2:29:37	Miroslava Hanáková (CZE)	3:21:48	
44	2005	Eusebio Rosa (POR)	2:27:31	Denisa Kozáková (CZE)	3:11:34	
45	2006	Jacek Kasprzyk (POL)	2:27:56	Ewa Fliegert (POL)	3:03:05	
46	2007	Damian Zawierucha (POL)	2:27:23	Ivana Martincová (CZE)	2:54:23	
47	2008	Jiří Žák (CZE)	2:31:07	Eva Munstrová (CZE)	3:12:43	
48	2009	Mulugeta Serbessa (CZE)	2:27:16	Jitka Hudáková (SVK)	3:15:00	
49	2010	Daniel Orálek (CZE)	2:30:58	Jana Dorazilová (CZE)	3:00:16	
50	2011	Mulugeta Serbessa (CZE)	2:29:26	Jitka Hudáková (SVK)	3:10:03	
51	2012	Daniel Orálek (CZE)	2:31:25	Iva Pachtová (CZE)	3:27:57	
52	2013	Mulugeta Serbessa (CZE)	2:35:42	Šárka Macháčková (CZE)	**2:49:41**	
53	2014	Mulugeta Serbessa (CZE)	2:31:43	Tereza Šádková (CZE)	3:24:38	
54	2015	Martin Kučera (CZE)	2:30:02	Eva Filipiová (CZE)	3:12:35	
55	2016	Milan Merva (CZE)	3:16:18	Iveta Fořtová (CZE)	3:40:23	
56	2017	Jan Kohut (CZE)	2:36:54	Petra Pastorová (CZE)	3:06:07	
57	2018	Petr Pechek (CZE)	2:27:07	Petra Pastorová (CZE)	2:58:39	
58	2019	Petr Muras (CZE)	2:37:41	Petra Pastorová (CZE)	3:03:02	
59	2020	Petr Buček (CZE)	2:34:31	Petra Pastorová (CZE)	2:52:58	
60	2021	Stanislav Najvert (CZE)	3:03:02	Petra Pastorová (CZE)	3:09:51	
61	2022	Oldřich Kokošek (CZE)	2:41:28	Petra Pastorová (CZE)	2:54:27	
62	2023	Jan Kohut (CZE)	2:35:43	Petra Pastorová (CZE)	3:02:14	

=== Multiple wins ===
Athletes with at least three wins listed.

Athlete	Wins	Category	Years
Mulugeta Serbessa (CZE)	8	Men's	2001, 2002, 2003, 2004, 2009, 2011, 2013, 2014
Petra Pastorová (CZE)	7	Women's	2017, 2018, 2019, 2020, 2021, 2022, 2023
Miroslav Ciboch (TCH)	4	Men's	1956, 1960, 1962, 1964
Ivana Brožová (TCH)	3	Women's	1987, 1989, 1991
