= Maurice de Conninck =

French middle-distance runner

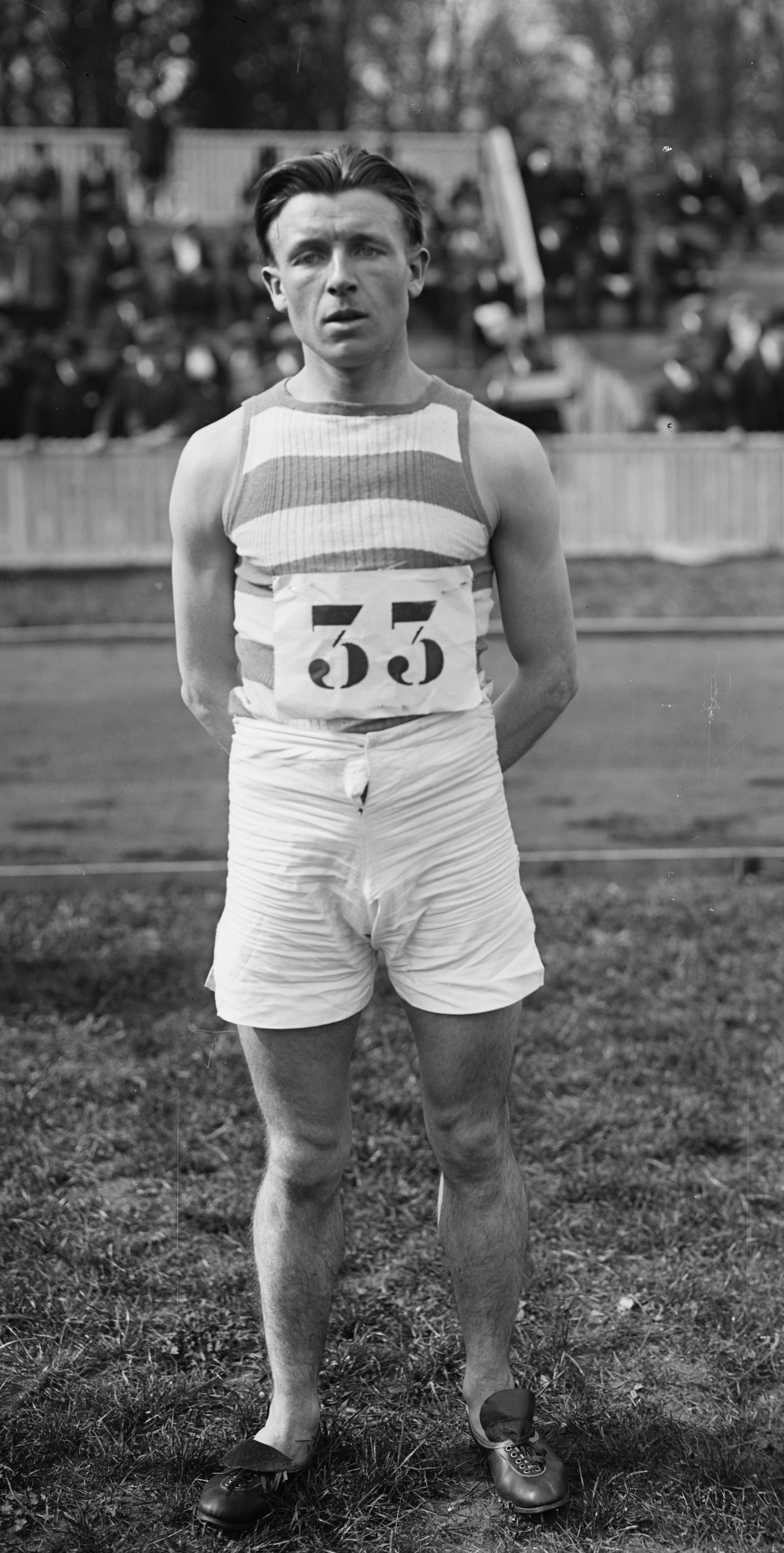
- de Connick in 1922

Personal information
- Nationality: French
- Born: 15 May 1897
- Died: 5 October 1987 (aged 90)

Sport
- Sport: Middle-distance running
- Event: 1500 metres

Maurice de Conninck (15 May 1897 – 5 October 1987) was a French middle-distance runner. He competed in the men's 1500 metres at the 1920 Summer Olympics.
