= René Leray =

French middle-distance runner

Personal information
- Nationality: French
- Born: 24 March 1901
- Died: 11 January 1988 (aged 86)

Sport
- Sport: Middle-distance running
- Event: 1500 metres

René Leray (24 March 1901 – 11 January 1988) was a French middle-distance runner. He competed in the men's 1500 metres at the 1920 Summer Olympics.
