= Juan Muguerza =

Spanish middle-distance runner

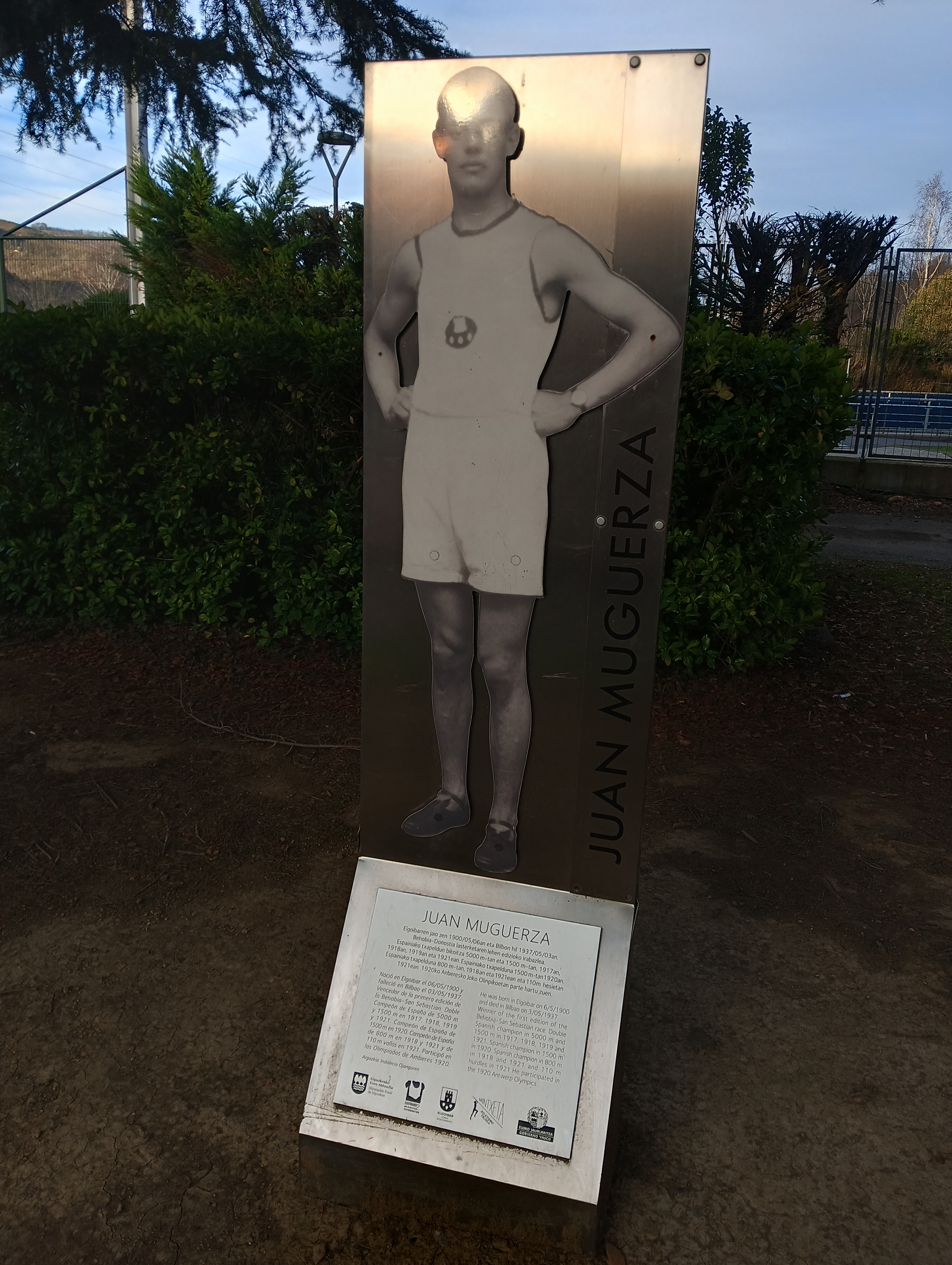
- Plaque in honor of Juan Mugertza

Personal information
- Nationality: Spanish
- Born: 6 May 1900
- Died: 5 May 1937 (aged 36)

Sport
- Sport: Middle-distance running
- Event: 1500 metres

Juan Muguerza Sasieta (6 May 1900 – 5 May 1937) was a Spanish middle-distance runner. He competed in the men's 1500 metres at the 1920 Summer Olympics.

Muguerza was a multiple-time national champion. He was killed in 1937 during the battle of Mungia in the Spanish Civil War. The Juan Muguerza Cross-Country annual cross country running race is named in his honor.
