= Léon Fourneau =

Belgian middle-distance runner

Personal information
- Nationality: Belgian
- Born: 17 March 1900
- Died: 31 March 1982 (aged 82)

Sport
- Sport: Middle-distance running
- Event: 1500 metres

Léon Fourneau (17 March 1900 – 31 March 1982) was a Belgian middle-distance runner. He competed in the 1500 metres at the 1920 Summer Olympics and the 1924 Summer Olympics. He was also a four time national champion in Belgium in the 1500 metres.
