= Karel Nedobitý =

Czech long-distance runner

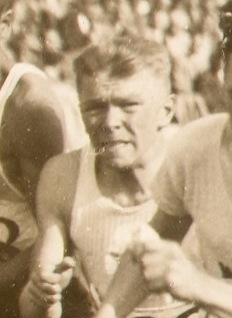
- Karel Nedobitý in 1928

Personal information
- Nationality: Czech
- Born: 13 August 1905 Peruc, Bohemia, Austria-Hungary
- Died: 24 July 1986 (aged 80) České Budějovice, Czechoslovakia

Sport
- Sport: Long-distance running
- Event: 5000 metres

Karel Nedobitý (13 August 1905 – 24 July 1986) was a Czech long-distance runner. He competed for Czechoslovakia in the 5000 metres at the 1924 Summer Olympics and the 1928 Summer Olympics.
