= Kazimierz Orzeł =

Polish long-distance runner

Personal information
- Nationality: Polish
- Born: 26 August 1943 (age 82) Bujne, Poland

Sport
- Sport: Long-distance running
- Event: Marathon

Kazimierz Orzeł (born 26 August 1943) is a Polish long-distance runner. He competed in the marathon at the 1976 Summer Olympics.
