= Arnošt Nejedlý =

Czech long-distance runner

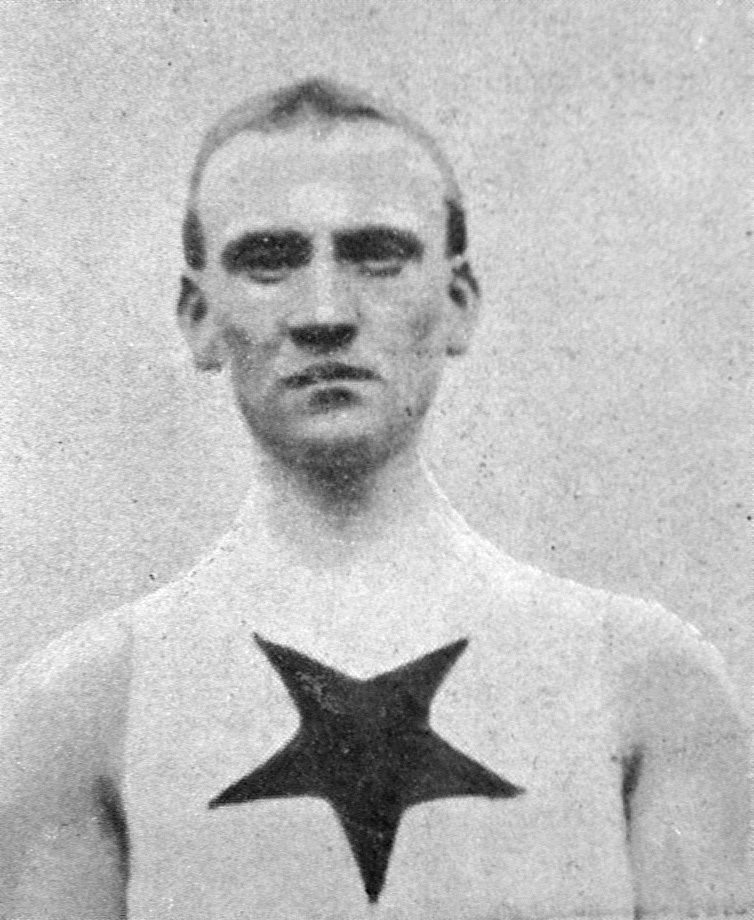
- Arnošt Nejedlý in 1908

Personal information
- Nationality: Czech
- Born: 22 May 1883
- Died: 1917 (aged 33–34)

Sport
- Country: Bohemia
- Sport: Long-distance running
- Event: Marathon

Arnošt Nejedlý (22 May 1883 – 1917) was a Czech long-distance runner. He competed for Bohemia in the men's marathon at the 1908 Summer Olympics. He was killed in action during World War I while serving in the Austro-Hungarian Army.

See also Bohemia at the 1906 Intercalated Games
