= Petra Kamínková =

Czech long-distance runner

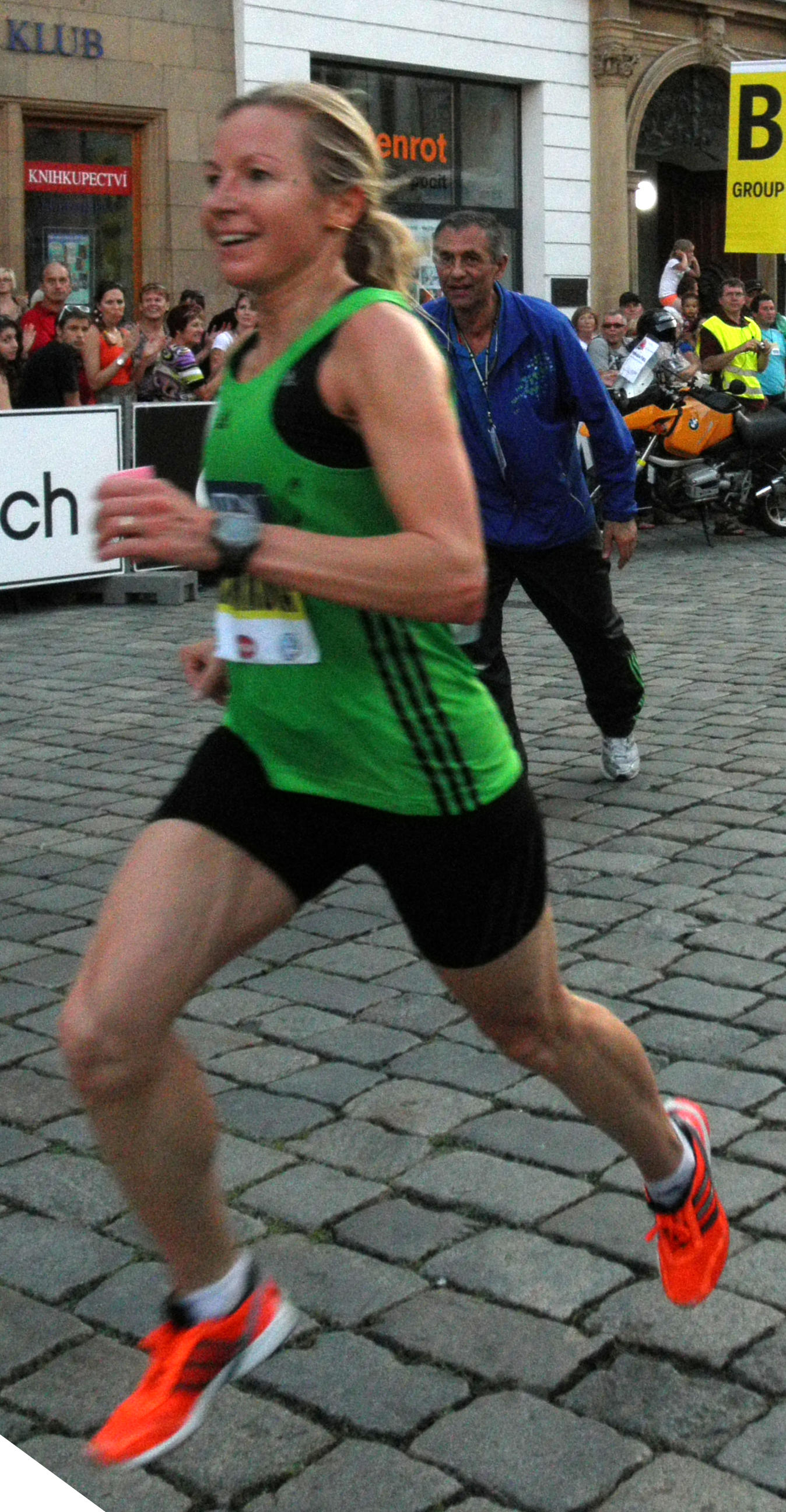
- Kamínková at the 2012 Olomouc Half Marathon

Personal information
- Nationality: Czech
- Born: 19 January 1973 (age 53) Olomouc, Czechoslovakia

Sport
- Sport: Athletics
- Event: Long-distance
- Club: AK Olomouc

Achievements and titles
- Personal bests: 5000 m: 16:11.52 (Gävle 2005); 10,000 m: 33:38.68 (Plzeň 2000); 5 km: 15:37 (Prague 2004); 10 km: 32:29 (Rijsbergen 2000); Half Marathon: 1:12:19 (Paderborn 2004); Marathon: 2:39:20 (Apeldoorn 2008)

Petra Kamínková (née Drajzajtlová; born 19 January 1973) is a Czech long distance runner. She won eleven consecutive races in the annual 10 km Běchovice – Prague Race. She is a 17-time national champion. She is the Czech national record holder in the women's 5K run, having set her time of 15:37 in 2004.

== Career ==
In 2002 Kamínková became the first woman to win the Běchovice – Prague Race four times in a row, having won her first three races under her maiden name of Drajzajtlová.

In 2004 Kamínková set a Czech national record of 15:37 in the women's 5K run, after finishing in 5th place at that year's Mattoni Grand Prix in Prague.

Kamínková won the women's Zwolle Half Marathon in June 2005 with a winning time of 1:13:46.

She won her eighth successive Běchovice – Prague Race in 2006, leading her rivals by around 500 metres for most of the race.

Kamínková was the seventh woman to finish the 2007 Prague Marathon, and the first Czech. In September 2007 she won her ninth consecutive Běchovice – Prague Race, finishing more than a minute in front of second-placed Vendula Frintová.

In 2008 Kamínková won the Běchovice – Prague Race for a tenth time in a row, finishing in a time of 36 minutes, 11 seconds. She subsequently extended her record sequence by winning the race in 2009 for her 11th consecutive title. Kamínková finished second in the Běchovice – Prague Race in 2013 at the age of 40, behind Christine Chepkemei of Kenya, to win her twelfth national championship title at that distance.

She was the first Czech woman to finish the 2015 Olomouc Half Marathon.
