= Philip Audinet =

English line-engraver

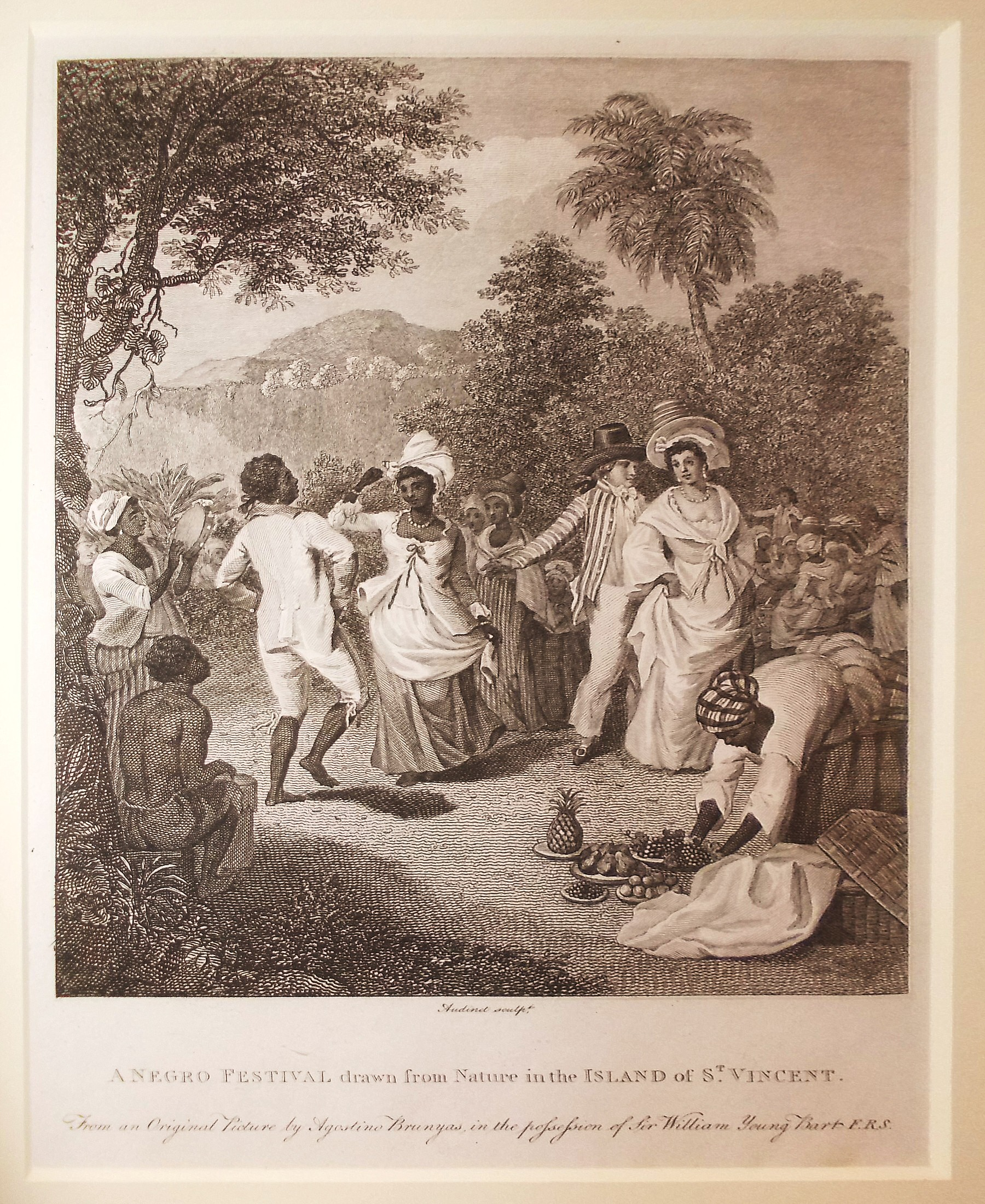
Engraving by Audinet, A Negro Festival drawn from Nature in the Island of St Vincent

Philip Audinet (1766 – 18 December 1837), was an English line-engraver.

== Life ==
Descended from a French family which came to England in after the revocation of the Edict of Nantes, Audinet was born in Soho, London, and served an apprenticeship with John Hall. He was employed on portraits for Harrison & Co.'s Biographical Magazine and other works.

Audinet died in London 18 December 1837, and was buried in the church of St Giles in the Fields.

== Works ==
He engraved Lear with the dead body of Cordelia, after Henry Fuseli, for John Bell's British Theatre, and portraits after pictures by Henri-Pierre Danloux, resident in England after the French Revolution. Among his later works are portraits of Sir Benjamin Hobhouse, 1st Baronet, and Sir William Domville, Bart., lord mayor of London, after William Owen, and an engraving of James Barry's unfinished portrait of Samuel Johnson, as well as the illustrations designed by Samuel Wale for the edition of Isaak Walton's Compleat Angler published in 1808. There is one plate in mezzotinto by him, a portrait of his brother, S. Audinet, a watchmaker. It is said to have been done for improvement when the artist was a boy, and to be the only impression that was taken off the plate.

== See also ==
- William Young Ottley, Notices of Engravers, 1831
- Samuel Redgrave, Dictionary of Artists of the English School, 1878
- John Chaloner Smith, British Mezzotinto Portraits, 1878, i. 4.
