= Josef Tomáš (runner) =

Czech long-distance runner

Personal information
- Nationality: Czechoslovak
- Born: 12 March 1934 (age 91) Studenec, Czechoslovakia

Sport
- Sport: Long-distance running
- Event: 5000 metres

Josef Tomáš (born 12 March 1934) is a Czechoslovak long-distance runner. He competed in the men's 5000 metres at the 1964 Summer Olympics.
