= Jaroslav Šourek (athlete) =

Czech long-distance runner

Personal information
- Nationality: Czechoslovak
- Born: 7 September 1927 Stará Boleslav, Czechoslovakia
- Died: 11 February 2003 (aged 75)

Sport
- Sport: Long-distance running
- Event: Marathon
- Club: Dukla Praha

Jaroslav Šourek (7 September 1927 – 11 February 2003) was a Czechoslovak long-distance runner. He finished 35th in the marathon at the 1952 Summer Olympics behind his teammate Emil Zátopek who won the event. He was a multiple champion of Czechoslovakia in the marathon including the inaugural Ostrava Marathon in 1954.
