= Pavel Kantorek =

Czech long-distance runner (1930–2023)

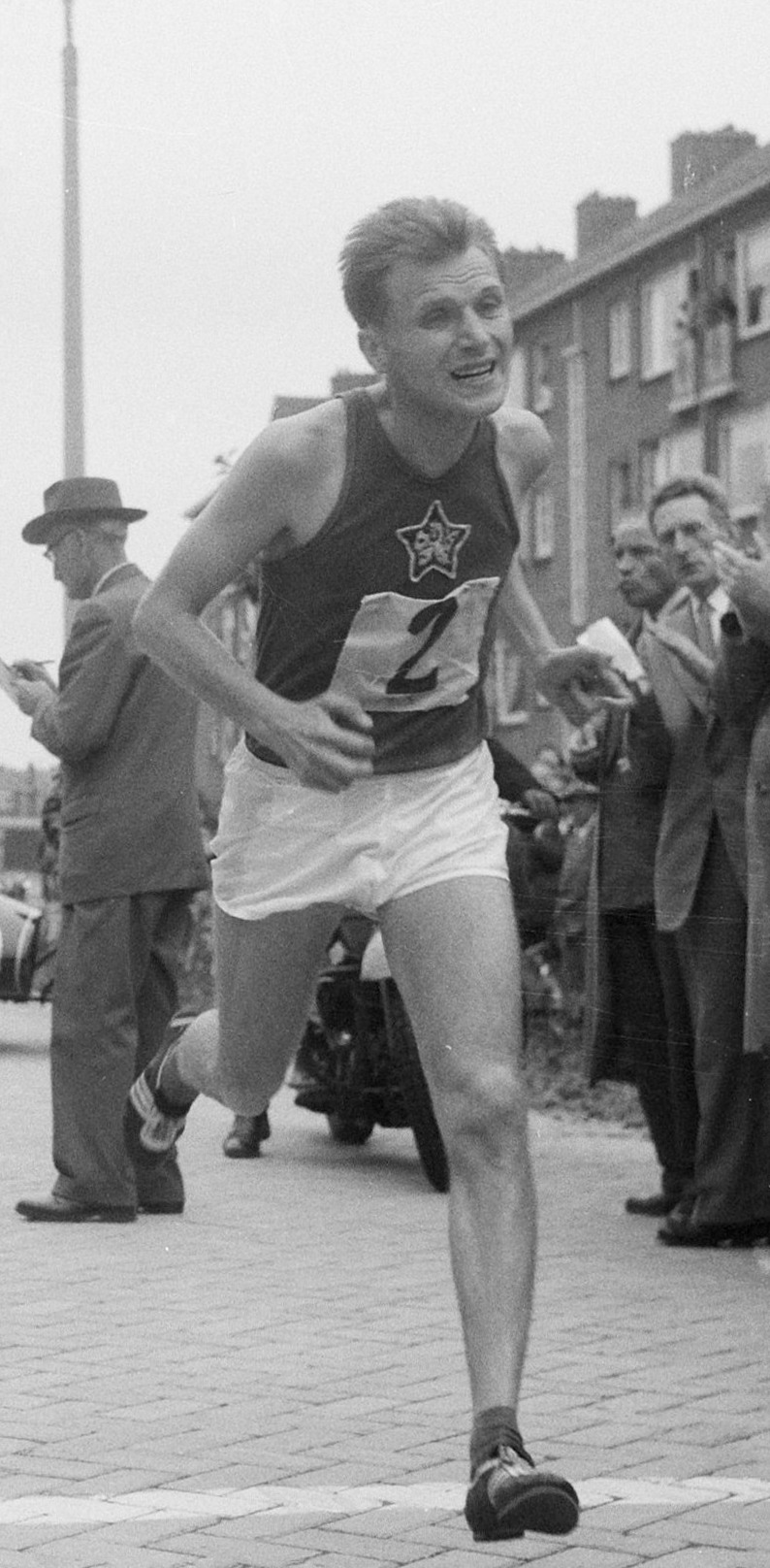
- Kantorek in 1958

Personal information
- Born: 8 February 1930 Prague, Czechoslovakia
- Died: 10 November 2023 (aged 93) Prague, Czech Republic
- Height: 1.72 m (5 ft 8 in)
- Weight: 63 kg (139 lb)

Sport
- Sport: Long-distance running
- Club: Sparta Praha, RH Praha

Pavel Kantorek (8 February 1930 – 10 November 2023) was long-distance runner from Czechoslovakia. He was born in Prague. He represented Czechoslovakia in three consecutive Summer Olympics in the men's marathon, starting in 1956. Kantorek was a three-time winner of the Košice Peace Marathon. He set a course record of 2:19:06 at the Ostrava Marathon, a record that was still standing 52 years later.

Kantorek died in Prague on 10 November 2023, at the age of 93.

== Marathon races ==
Year	Competition	Venue	Position	Event	Notes
1958	Košice Peace Marathon	Košice, Czechoslovakia	1st	Marathon	2:29:37
1959	Enschede Marathon	Enschede, Netherlands	1st	Marathon	2:26:48
1959	Ostrava Marathon	Ostrava, Czechoslovakia	1st	Marathon	2:19:06
1961	Fukuoka Marathon	Fukuoka, Japan	1st	Marathon	2:22:05
1962	Košice Peace Marathon	Košice, Czechoslovakia	1st	Marathon	2:28:29
1964	Košice Peace Marathon	Košice, Czechoslovakia	1st	Marathon	2:25:55
