= František Slavík (athlete) =

Czech runner

Personal information
- Nationality: Czech
- Born: 25 September 1888 Prague, Austria-Hungary
- Died: 2 October 1926 (aged 38)

Sport
- Sport: Long-distance running
- Event: Marathon

František Slavík (25 September 1888 – 2 October 1926) was a Czech long-distance runner. He competed for Bohemia in the marathon at the 1912 Summer Olympics.
