= Arturo Porro (athlete) =

Italian middle-distance runner

Personal information
- Nationality: Italian
- Born: 1890 Milan
- Died: 1967 (aged 77–78) Milan

Sport
- Country: Italy
- Sport: Athletics
- Event: Middle-distance running

Arturo Porro (1890 – 1967) was an Italian middle-distance runner who competed at the 1920 Summer Olympics.
