= Daniel Orálek =

Czech long-distance runner

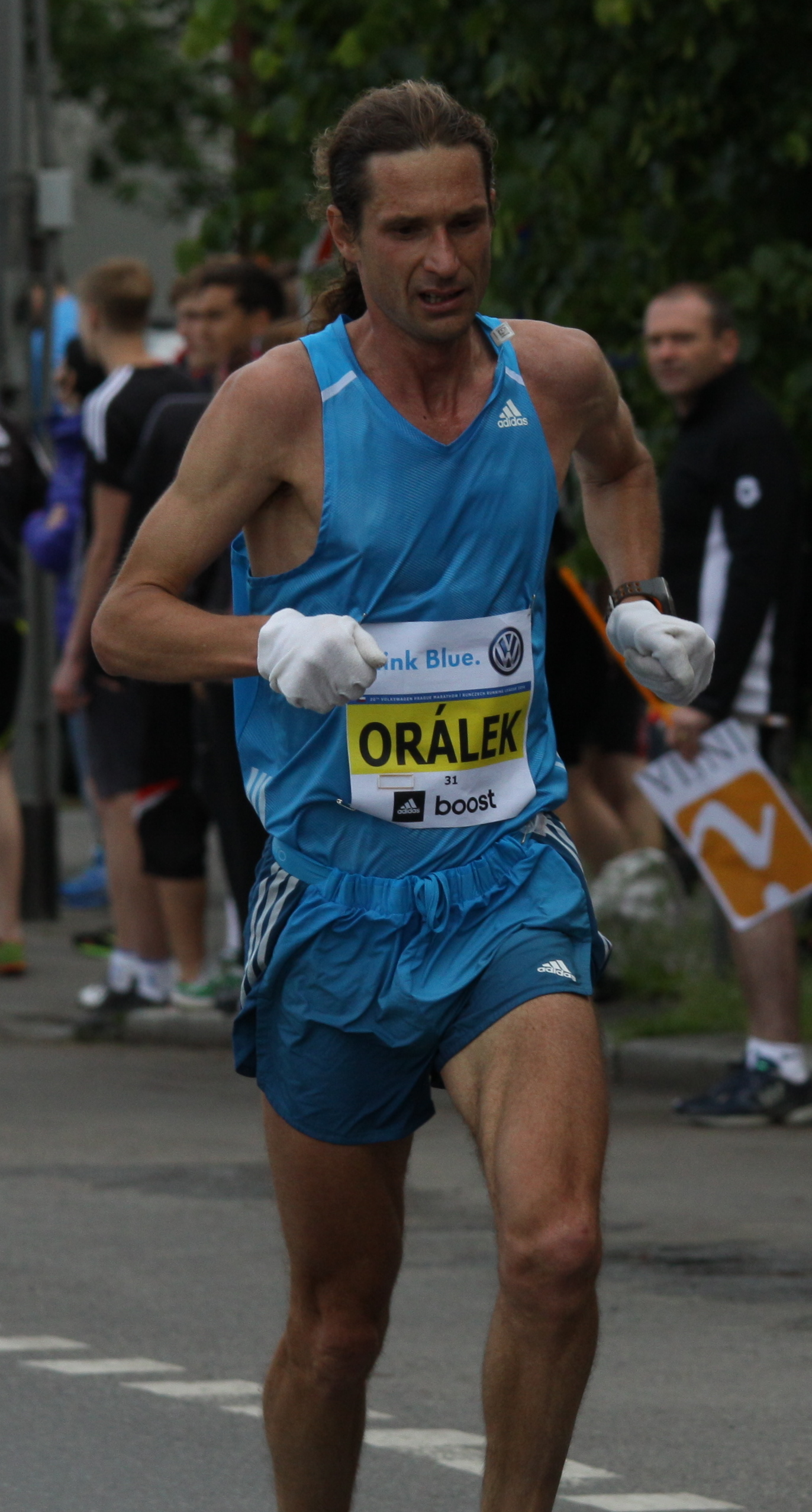
- Orálek in 2014

Personal information
- Born: 29 March 1970 (age 56) Brno, Czechoslovakia

Sport
- Sport: Long-distance running
- Club: AC Moravská Slávia Brno

Daniel Orálek (born 29 March 1970) is a Czech long-distance runner and photographer. He is a four-time winner of the 100 km Winschoten ultramarathon (2008, 2010, 2012, 2014). He won the Ostrava Marathon in 2010 and 2012. In 1989 Orálek set the Czechoslovak junior record for the 10,000 metres, running a time of 30:13.03. He finished 11th in the 10,000 metres event at the 1989 European Athletics Junior Championships.

Orálek finished fifth in the 2011 Spartathlon, and finished 10th in the 2010 Badwater Ultramarathon. He took part in the Comrades Marathon in 2016, finishing 163rd in a time of 6 hours and 49 minutes. In 2017 Orálek won the Moravia Ultramarathon, a race involving running 7 marathons on 7 consecutive days, for the tenth time.

== Personal bests ==
- 3000 metres - 8:10.72 min (1992)
- 5000 metres - 14:34.92 min (1990)
- 10,000 metres - 29:50.3 min (1994)
- Half marathon - 1:04:33 hrs (1994)
- Marathon - 2:26:58 hrs (2011)
- 50K run - 2:58:40 hrs (2009)
- 100K run - 6:54:50 hrs (2011)
