= Josef Hušek =

Personal information
- Nationality: Czechoslovak
- Born: 27 January 1913

Sport
- Sport: Middle-distance running
- Event: Steeplechase

Josef Hušek (born 27 January 1913, date of death unknown) was a Czechoslovak middle-distance runner. He competed in the men's 3000 metres steeplechase at the 1936 Summer Olympics.
