= André Audinet =

French middle-distance runner

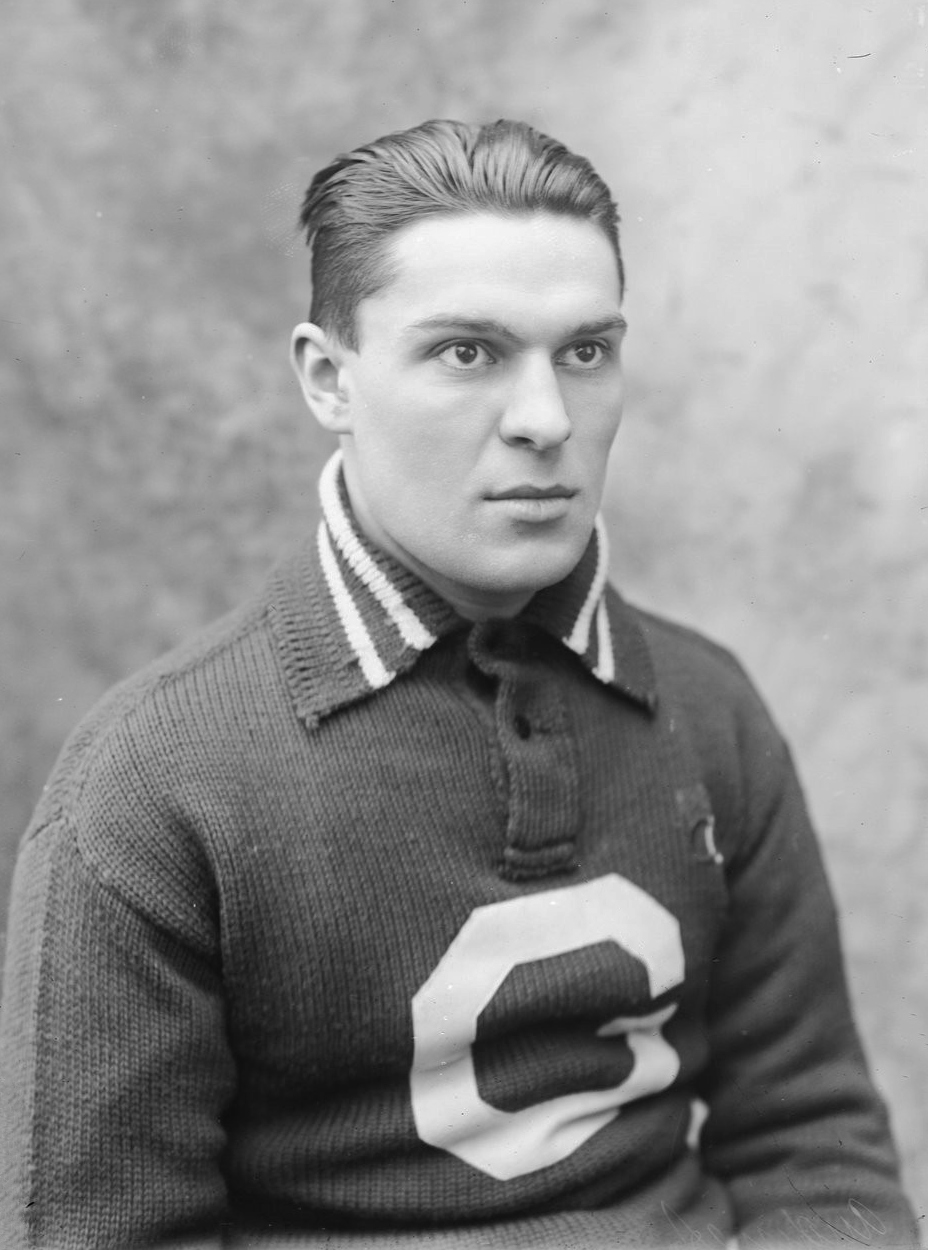
- Audinet in 1921

Personal information
- Born: 13 May 1898 Donzy, France
- Died: 18 April 1948 (aged 49) Paris, France

Sport
- Sport: Athletics
- Event: 1500 m
- Club: CASG Paris

Achievements and titles
- Personal best: 1500 m – 4.03.7 (1920)

André Audinet (13 May 1898 – 18 April 1948) was a French middle-distance runner. He competed in the 1500 m athletic event at the 1920 Summer Olympics and placed sixth.
