= Václav Vohralík =

Czechoslovak middle-distance runner

Václav Vohralík (2 January 1892– 6 June 1985) was a Czechoslovak track and field athlete who competed in the 1920 Summer Olympics. He was born in Brno, then Austria-Hungary, and died in Sydney, Australia. He was 5 ft 11 in (180 cm) and 168 lb (76 kg).

On 19 August 1920 he finished fourth in the 1500 metres event with a time of 4:04.6.5 in Antwerpen. His personal best was 4:01.6 (1921). On 24 April 1921 he achieved first place in the first Devin-Bratislava 11.6 km with a time of 36:51.4.
