= Vlastimil Zwiefelhofer =

Personal information
- Nationality: Czech
- Born: 20 November 1952 (age 73) Klatovy, Czechoslovakia

Sport
- Sport: Long-distance running
- Event: Marathon

Vlastimil Zwiefelhofer (born 20 November 1952) is a Czech long-distance runner. He competed in the marathon at the 1980 Summer Olympics. Zwiefelhofer took part in the 1979 IAAF World Cross Country Championships – Senior men's race, finishing sixth. Domestically, Zwiefelhofer won the Běchovice – Prague Race four times, the Velká kunratická cross-country race nine times and set the Czechoslovak record in the marathon. In the 79th Běchovice – Prague Race in 1975, he set a course record, finishing with a time of 28:35.2, reported at the time to be a mark that nobody would break in the following 20 years. He was inducted into the Plzeň Region hall of fame for his sporting achievements in April 2024.
