= 2018 Czech Athletics Championships =

- Edition: 26th
- Dates: 28–29 July
- Host city: Kladno, Czech Republic
- Venue: Municipal Stadium Sletiště
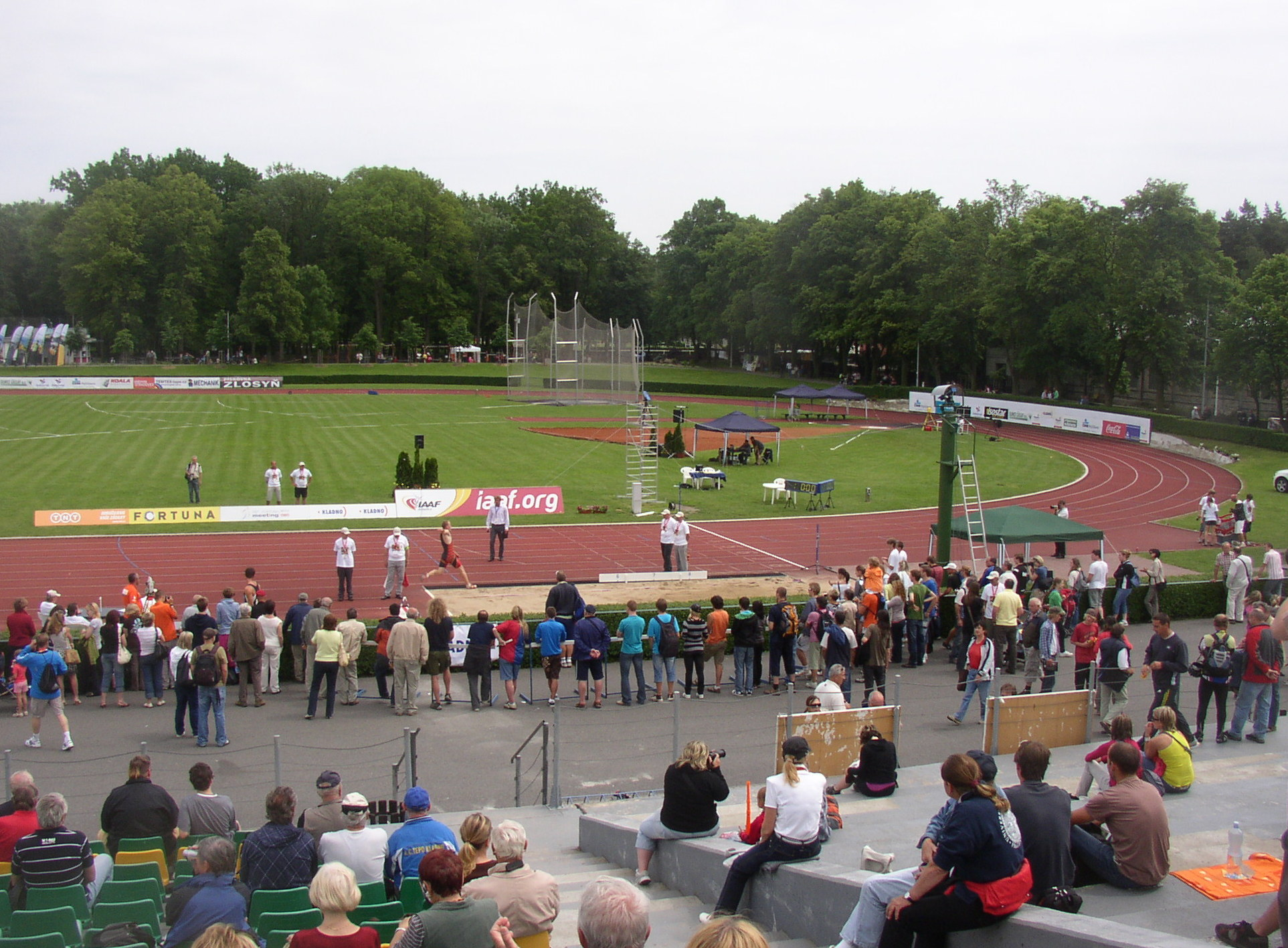
- Events: 40 (+6)

The 2018 Czech Athletics Championships (Czech: Mistrovství České republiky v atletice 2018) was the 26th edition of the national outdoor track and field championships for the Czech Republic. It was held on 28 and 29 July at the Municipal Stadium Sletiště in Kladno. The host club for the competition was AC Tepo Kladno. The same venue is used for the annual TNT – Fortuna Meeting combined events meeting.

Several events were held separately from the main track and field competition. The 10,000 metres took place in Brno on 28 April, the marathon championships were held within the annual Prague Marathon on 6 May, and the 20 kilometres race walk championships were held within the annual Poděbrady Race Walking meet in Poděbrady on 7 April. The men's 50 kilometres race walk was cancelled.

== Results ==
=== Men ===
Event	Gold		Silver		Bronze	
100 metres	Zdeněk Stromšík	10.43	Jan Veleba	10.55	David Kolář	10.57
200 metres	Jan Jirka	20.75	David Kolář	21.02	Jiří Kubeš	21.26
400 metres	Pavel Maslák	46.09	Patrik Šorm	46.64	Michal Desenský	46.69
800 metres	Lukáš Hodboď	1:47.36	Jan Kubista	1:48.74	Lukáš Symerský	1:48.82
1500 metres	Jan Friš	3:55.06	Jan Sýkora	3:55.32	Daniel Kotyza	3:55.33
5000 metres	Jakub Zemaník	14:29.69	Jakub Holuša	14:44.45	Dominik Sádlo	14:52.28
10,000 metres	Lukáš Olejníček	31:30.26	David Kákona	31:54.89	Kamil Krunka	31:57.89
Marathon	Jiří Homoláč	2:20:09	Petr Pechek	2:20:30	Vít Pavlišta	2:22:25
110 m hurdles	David Sklenář	14.20	David Ryba	14.22	Jiří Kubeš	14.33
400 m hurdles	Michal Brož	50.16	Martin Tuček	50.50	Jan Tesař	50.54
3000 m s'chase	Jáchym Kovář	09:01.97	Lukáš Olejníček	09:06.75	Jan Janů	09:10.05
4 × 100 m relay	Řehák; Holub; Jíra; Hampl	41.43	Grabmuller; Tlustý; Svoboda J. Chlopčík	41.55	Žouželka; Benda; Netymach; Kadlec	42.46
4 × 400 m relay	A Šnajdr; Tlustý; Chlopčík; Šnejdr	3:13.05	Ryba; Hybner; Hodboď; Müller	3:15.68	Maruštík; Větrovský; Rež; Kubeš	3:16.22
High jump	Jaroslav Bába	2.14 m	Matyáš Dalecký	2.10 m	Matěj Klukan	2.10 m
Pole vault	Jan Kudlička	5.50 m	Dan Bárta	5.21 m	Matěj Ščerba	5.06 m
Long jump	Radek Juška	7.92 m	David Holý	7.19 m	Jan Doležal	7.19 m
Triple jump	Jiří Vondráček	15.49 m	Jiří Zeman	15.46 m	Zdeněk Kubát	15.37 m
Shot put	Tomáš Staněk	21.52 m	Martin Novák	18.74 m	Filip Litavský	16.22 m
Discus throw	Tomáš Voňavka	57.87 m	Jan Marcell	57.08 m	Jakub Forejt	53.94 m
Hammer throw	Miroslav Pavlíček	69.18 m	Michal Fiala	66.60 m	Lukáš Melich	63.83 m
Javelin throw	Petr Frydrych	83.85 m	Jaroslav Jílek	78.09 m	Štěpán Mikoška	71.69 m
Decathlon	Jan Doležal	8033 pts	Marek Lukáš	7814 pts	Tomáš Pulíček	7104 pts
20 km walk	Lukáš Gdula	1:31:04	Vít Hlaváč	1:32:40	Tomáš Hlavenka	1:36:19

=== Women ===
Event	Gold		Silver		Bronze	
100 metres	Klára Seidlová	11.64	Marcela Pírková	11.86	Lucie Domská	12.00
200 metres	Jana Slaninová	23.72	Barbora Dvořáková	24.26	Nicoleta Turnerová	24.50
400 metres	Alena Symerská	53.02	Zdeňka Seidlová	53.08	Lada Vondrová	53.72
800 metres	Simona Vrzalová	2:10.64	Diana Mezuliáníková	2:10.65	Kristiina Mäki	2:12.27
1500 metres	Lucie Sekanová	4:21.54	Renata Vocásková	4:31.64	Karolína Sasynová	4:32.62
5000 metres	Kristiina Mäki	16:34.69	Moira Stewartová	16:40.09	Barbora Jíšová	16:52.49
10,000 metres	Moira Stewartová	35:52.37	Barbora Jíšová	36:28.30	Adéla Stránská	37:41.24
Marathon	Petra Pastorová	2:48:40	Marcela Joglová	2:49:17	Ivana Sekyrová	2:49:51
100 m hurdles	Lucie Koudelová	13.75	Nikoleta Jíchová	13.76	Helena Jiranová	13.76
400 m hurdles	Zuzana Hejnová	56.08	Martina Hofmanová	58.67	Kateřina Ulrichová	58.93
3000 m s'chase	Eva Krchová	10:11.69	Barbora Jíšová	10:32.94	Tereza Hrochová	10:46.92
4 × 100 m relay	A Domská; Pírková; Hofmanová; Jiranová	45.44	Rabiňáková; Kubicová; Kaletová; Kotková	48.82	Káclová; Edlová; Hanzlíková; Votinská	56.13
4 × 400 m relay	Bičianová; Chrpová; Šimková; Hofmanová	3:45.48	Muzikantová; Krupařová; Řehounková; Mezulianíková	3:47.13	Kratochvílová; Vocásková; Jirmanová; Seidlová	3:48.87
High jump	Michaela Hrubá	1.88 m	Lada Pejchalová	1.82 m	Nikola Strachová Kateřina Cachová	1.77 m
Pole vault	Amálie Švábíková	4.25 m	Zuzana Pražáková	4.01 m	Aneta Morysková	4.01 m
Long jump	Adéla Záhorová	6.29 m	Michaela Kučerová	6.09 m	Kateřina Cachová	6.01 m
Triple jump	Lucie Májková	12.93 m	Šárka Buranská	12.75 m	Karolína Černá	12.64 m
Shot put	Markéta Červenková	16.39 m	Jana Kárníková	15.09 m	Petra Klementová	14.82 m
Discus throw	Eliška Staňková	56.76 m	Barbora Tichá	47.99 m	Natálie Veselá	46.38 m
Hammer throw	Kateřina Šafránková	66.98 m	Tereza Králová	64.64 m	Kateřina Chlupová	63.81 m
Javelin throw	Nikola Ogrodníková	62.24 m	Irena Šedivá	57.30 m	Jarmila Jurkovičová	51.98 m
Heptathlon	Barbora Zatloukalová	5557 pts	Kateřina Dvořáková	5538 pts	Anna Kerbachová	5407 pts
20 km walk	Anežka Drahotová	1:32:22	Lenka Borovičková	1:59:57	Naděžda Dušková	2:03:26
