= 2019 Czech Athletics Championships =

- Edition: 27th
- Dates: 26–27 July
- Host city: Brno, Czech Republic
- Venue: Pod Palackého Stadium
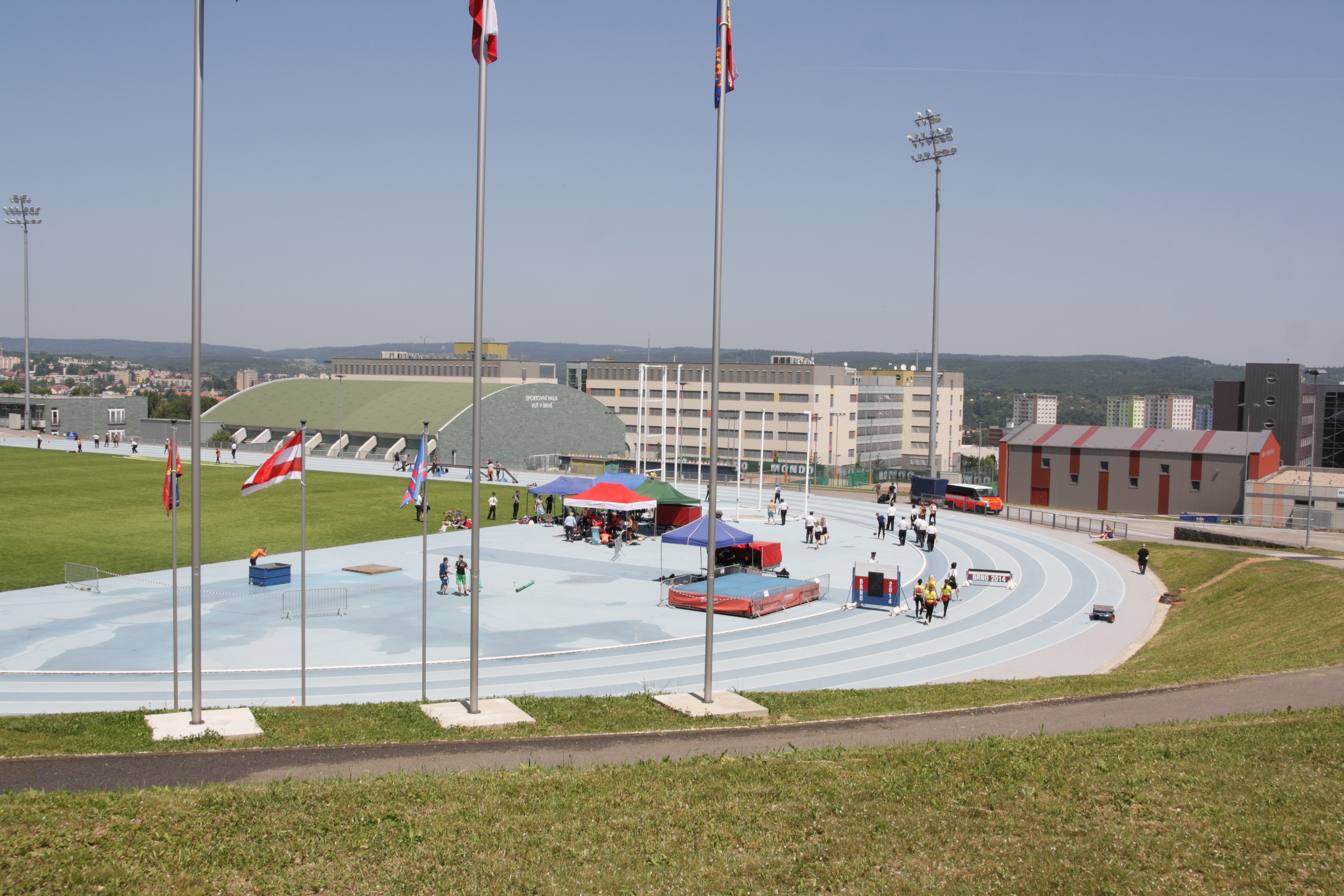
- Events: 47

The 2019 Czech Athletics Championships (Czech: Mistrovství České republiky v atletice 2019) was the 27th edition of the national outdoor track and field championships for the Czech Republic. It took place from 26 to 27 July 2019 at the stadium in the Pod Palackého Stadium in Brno, organized by the local club AC Moravská Slavia Brno.

== Results ==
=== Men ===
Event	Gold		Silver		Bronze	
100 metres	Jan Veleba	10.16	Zdeněk Stromšík	10.17	Dominik Záleský	10.24
200 metres	Pavel Maslák	20.90	Jan Veleba	21.04	Jan Jirka	21.06
400 metres	Patrik Šorm	46.73	Jakub Veselý	47.49	Lukáš Hodboď	47.61
800 metres	Filip Šnejdr	1:47.05	Hakim Saleh	1:48.01	Tomáš Vystrk	1:48.86
1500 metres	Jakub Holuša	3:44.96	Filip Sasínek	3:46.50	Viktor Šinágl	3:48.43
5000 metres	Jan Friš	14:29.05	Jiří Homoláč	14:32.28	Roman Budil	14:33.76
10,000 metres	David Foller	31:15.90	Dominik Sádlo	31:21.07	Kamil Krunka	31:28.37
Marathon	Vít Pavlišta	2:16:30	Jiří Homoláč	2:21:23	Petr Pechek	2:22:21
110 m hurdles	Jiří Sýkora	14.15	Michal Brož	14.19	David Ryba	14.23
400 m hurdles	Vít Müller	49.59	Jan Tesař	50.50	Martin Tuček	50.93
3000 m s'chase	Jáchym Kovář	09:01.97	Damián Vích	09:05.30	David Foller	09:07.30
4 × 100 m relay	Koška; Holub; Jíra; Hampl	40.65	Grabmuller; Tlustý; Svoboda J. Pekárek	40.75	Ličman; Maruštík; Rež; Procházka	41.26
4 × 400 m relay	Desenský; Blatník; Hodboď; Müller	3:13.11	Mach; Růžička; Grabmüller; Šnejdr	3:13.33	Suchánek; Vystrk; Kotyza; Tuček	3:14.15
20 km walk	Lukáš Gdula	1:27:14	Vít Hlaváč	1:28:56	Tomáš Hlavenka	1:33:49
50 km walk	Lukáš Gdula	3:59:33	Tomáš Hlavenka	4:20:12	Vít Hlaváč	4:30:46
High jump	Martin Heindl	2.21 m	Josef Adámek	2.17 m	Marek Bahník	2.17 m
Pole vault	Jan Kudlička	5.44 m	Matěj Ščerba	5.36 m	David Holý	5.21 m
Long jump	Radek Juška	7.72 m	Jan Vondráček	7.60 m	Jan JIrásek	7.20 m
Triple jump	Ondřej Vodák	16.02 m	Jiří Vondráček	15.79 m	Tomáš Janeček	15.38 m
Shot put	Tomáš Staněk	19.81 m	Martin Novák	18.31 m	David Tupý	17.34 m
Discus throw	Marek Bárta	62.32 m	Tomáš Voňavka	58.27 m	Jan Marcell	55.02 m
Hammer throw	Miroslav Pavlíček	69.60 m	Patrik Hájek	63.92 m	Daniel Čapek	58.39 m
Javelin throw	Jakub Vadlejch	83.22 m	Vítězslav Veselý	79.27 m	Petr Frydrych	75.03 m
Decathlon	Jan Doležal	8142 pts	Marek Lukáš	7892 pts	Ondřej Kopecký	7627 pts

=== Women ===
Event	Gold		Silver		Bronze	
100 metres	Klára Seidlová	11.38	Nikola Bendová	11.41	Marcela Pírková	11.51
200 metres	Marcela Pírková	23.56	Nikola Bendová	23.86	Nicoleta Turnerová	24.13
400 metres	Lada Vondrová	51.71	Zuzana Hejnová	52.44	Tereza Petržilková	53.47
800 metres	Kristiina Mäki	2:08.41	Vendula Hluchá	2:08.84	Diana Mezuliáníková	2:09.10
1500 metres	Kristiina Mäki	4:25.95	LUcie Sekanová	4:27.25	Renata Vocásková	4:28.96
5000 metres	Moira Stewartová	16:22.74	Aneta Chlebíková	16:32.33	Tereza Hrochová	16:43.24
10,000 metres	Moira Stewartová	33:24.58	Hana Homolková	36:21.26	Martina Vévodová	37:24.25
100 m hurdles	Lucie Koudelová	13.34	Helena Jiranová	13.39	Tereza Vokálová	13.73
400 m hurdles	Tereza Jonášová	59.16	Lucie Pertlíková	59.41	Michaela Bičianová	59.81
3000 m s'chase	Eva Krchová	10:13.76	Tereza Hrochová	10:33.12	Lucie Svobodová	10:57.27
4 × 100 m relay	Seidlová; Pírková; Domská; Jiranová	44.43	Kobianová; B. Dvořáková; Hofmanová; Koudelová	44.93	Pichalová; Hettlerová; Suchá; Majerová	46.12
4 × 400 m relay	Jonášová; Suráková; Hettlerová; Petržilková	3:40.29	Hofmanová; Červinová; Bičianová; Pírková	3:45.02	Staňková; Šimková; Matějková; Ulrichová	3:48.87
Marathon	Petra Pastorová	2:42:22	Tereza Ďurdiaková	2:47:16	Barbora Jíšová	2:48:09
20 km walk	Anežka Drahotová	1:35:43	Veronika Janošíková	1:49:08	Štěpánka Pohlová Kučerová	1:56:30
High jump	Bára Sajdoková	1.80 m	Oldřiška Marešová	1.76 m	Denisa Majerová	1.76 m
Pole vault	Romana Maláčová	4.40 m	Amálie Švábíková	4.27 m	Nikola Pőschlová	4.01 m
Long jump	Barbora Hůlková	6.37 m	Kateřina Cachová	6.28 m	Michaela Kučerová	6.27 m
Triple jump	Emma Maštalířová	12.42 m	Lucie Májková	12.40 m	Šárka Vachatá	12.34 m
Shot put	Markéta Červenková	17.28 m	Petra Klementová	15.21 m	Gabriela Pallová	14.57 m
Discus throw	Eliška Staňková	57.16 m	Markéta Červenková	48.82 m	Lenka Matoušková	45.63 m
Hammer throw	Kateřina Šafránková	67.25 m	Tereza Králová	64.15 m	Pavla Kuklová	62.07 m
Javelin throw	Barbora Špotáková	63.14 m	Irena Šedivá	57.66 m	Nikola Ogrodníková	56.36 m
Heptathlon	Jana Novotná	5905 pts	Kateřina Dvořáková	5671 pts	Barbora Dvořáková	5350 pts
