= 2020 Czech Athletics Championships =

- Edition: 28th
- Dates: 8–9 August
- Host city: Plzeň, Czech Republic
- Venue: Atletický stadion města Plzně
- Events: 47

The 2020 Czech Athletics Championships (Czech: Mistrovství České republiky v atletice 2020) was the 28th edition of the national outdoor track and field championships for the Czech Republic. It took place from 8–9 August at Atletický stadion města Plzně in Plzeň, organized by the local club AK Škoda Plzeň.

== Results ==
=== Men ===
Event	Gold		Silver		Bronze	
100 metres	Jan Veleba	10.28 s	Dominik Záleský	10.35 s	David Kolář	10.48 s SB
200 metres	Jiří Polák	20.63 s	Jan Veleba	21.02 s	Dominik Záleský	21.08 s
400 metres	Matěj Krsek	46.25 s	Michal Desenský	46.61 s SB	Jakub Veselý	46.82 s PB
800 metres	Lukáš Hodboď	1:47.98 min SB	Tomáš Vystrk	1:48.34 min SB	Filip Šnejdr	1:48.59 min
1500 metres	Filip Sasínek	3:36.72 min CR	Jan Friš	3:39.05 min PB	Viktor Šinágl	3:40.68 min PB
5000 metres	Viktor Šinágl	14:31.37 min SB	Dominik Sádlo	14:45.47 min SB	Vladimír Marčík	14:49.83 min
110 m hurdles	Jan Kisiala	14.33 s	Jiří Sýkora	14.33 s	David Ryba	14.40 s
400 m hurdles	Vít Müller	49.93 s	Michal Brož	50.69 s SB	Martin Tuček	51.01 s
3000 m s'chase	Damián Vích	8:48.47 min	David Foller	8:52.07 min PB	Jáchym Kovář	8:55.28 min
4 × 100 m relay	AC Slovan Liberec; David Kolář; Jan Král; Jan Trafina; Jakub Trafina	40.65 s	ASK Slavia Praha; Adam Grabmüller; Michal Tlustý; Vojtěch Svoboda; Jan Valášek	40.82 s	PSK Olymp Praha; Jiří Pechar; Štěpán Hampl; S. Jíra; J. Kisiala	40.90 s
4 × 400 m relay	VSK Univerzita Brno; M. Juránek; Tomáš Vystrk; Tadeáš Plaček; Martin Tuček	3:12.33 min	ASK Slavia Praha; Martin Růžička; Vladislav Sadirov; Josef Drahota; Filip Šnejdr	3:12.95 min	A. C. TEPO Kladno; Matěj Krsek; Jan Hřích; Jan Ullman; Daniel Lehar	3:13.89 min
High jump	Marek Bahník	2.14 m	Jan Štefela	2.10 m	Ondřej Vodák Matěj Klukan	2.06 m
Pole vault	Jan Kudlička	5.51 m	Dan Bárta	5.41 m PB	Matěj Ščerba	5.41 m PB
Long jump	Radek Juška	8.10 m CR	Jakub Bystroň	7.74 m PB	Adam Pekárek	7.55 m PB
Triple jump	Jiří Vondráček	16.34 m	Zdeněk Kubát	16.24 m PB	Ondřej Vodák	15.93 m SB
Shot put	Martin Novák	18.27 m	Tomáš Vilímek	17.47 m	Ladislav Prášil	17.19 m
Discus throw	Marek Bárta	61.01 m	Tomáš Voňavka	58.30 m	Jakub Forejt	54.28 m
Hammer throw	Patrik Hájek	71.19 m	Miroslav Pavlíček	66.53 m	Petr Koucký	64.57 m
Javelin throw	Petr Frydrych	79.38 m	Jaroslav Jílek	77.98 m	Vítězslav Veselý	76.24 m

=== Women ===
Event	Gold		Silver		Bronze	
100 metres	Marcela Pírková	11.61 s SB	Eva Kubíčková	11.62 s PB=	Jana Slaninová	11.72 s
200 metres	Martina Hofmanová	23.43 s PB	Nikola Bendová	23.50 s SB	Marcela Pírková	23.71 s
400 metres	Barbora Malíková	51.65 s NU20R	Lada Vondrová	51.90 s	Martina Hofmanová	53.29 s PB
800 metres	Vendula Hluchá	2:09.75 min	Diana Mezuliáníková	2:10.09 min	Adéla Sádlová	2:10.59 min
1500 metres	Simona Vrzalová	4:17.41 min	Moira Stewartová	4:25.06 min SB	Pavla Štoudková	2:35.82 min PB
5000 metres	Simona Vrzalová	16:08.63 min	Moira Stewartová	16:27.15 min SB	Lucie Maršánová	17:07.69 min SB
100 m hurdles	Kateřina Cachová	13.23 s	Lucie Koudelová	13.32 s SB	Markéta Štolová	13.52 s
400 m hurdles	Zuzana Hejnová	55.70 s	Nikoleta Jíchová	57.76 s	Kristýna Korelová	58.72 s PB
3000 m s'chase	Tereza Novotná	10:12.94 min	Tereza Hrochová	10:14.09 min PB	Bára Stýblová	10:44.76 min SB
4 × 100 m relay	USK Praha 1 Kristýna Kobiánová; Marcela Pírková; Martina Hofmanová; Lucie Domská	46.01 s	USK Praha 2 Milena Kučerová; Kateřina Dvořáková; Věra Holubová; Barbora Dvořáková	46.40 s	AK ŠKODA Plzeň; K. Adlerová; Linda Hettlerová; Denisa Majerová; Linda Suchá	46.44 s
4 × 400 m relay	AK ŠKODA Plzeň; L. Hettlerová; Anna Suráková; Veronika Meczlová; Tereza Petržilková	3:44.21 min	ASK Slavia Praha; Zuzana Cymbálová; J. Matějková; M. Veverková; Anna Šimková	3:46.58 min	USK Praha; Lucie Pertlíková; V. Petrásková; K. Chrpová; Věra Holubářová	3:48.56 min
High jump	Bára Sajdoková	1.90 m	Michaela Hrubá	1.86 m	Alena Panovská	1.77 m
Pole vault	Amálie Švábíková Romana Maláčová	4.46 m	Not awarded		Zuzana Pražáková	4.06 m SB
Long jump	Linda Suchá	6.45 m	Jana Novotná	6.37 m PB	Michaela Kučerová	6.30 m
Triple jump	Linda Suchá	13.35 m	Emma Maštalířová	13.26 m PB	Petra Harasimová	12.70 m
Shot put	Markéta Červenková	18.08 m	Katrin Brzyszkowská	14.77 m	Lenka Valešová	14.28 m
Discus throw	Eliška Staňková	56.34 m	Lenka Matoušková	48.36 m SB	Barbora Tichá	48.31 m
Hammer throw	Lenka Valešová	65.50 m	Tereza Králová	62.91 m SB	Adéla Korečková	61.70 m SB
Javelin throw	Nikola Ogrodníková	61.41 m	Barbora Špotáková	59.94 m	Martina Píšová	56.96 m PB
