= 2021 Czech Athletics Championships =

- Organisers: Technicky zajišťuje Atletický klub Zlín
- Edition: 52nd
- Dates: 26–27 June
- Host city: Zlín, Czech Republic
- Venue: Stadion Mládeže
- Level: Senior
- Type: Outdoor
- Events: 38
- Participation: 505 athletes

The 2021 Czech Athletics Championships was the 52nd edition of the national championship in outdoor track and field for athletes in Czech Republic. It was held between 26 and 27 June at the Stadion Mládeže in Zlín.

== Results ==
=== Men ===
Event	Gold		Silver		Bronze	
100 metres	Dominik Záleský; TJ Dukla Praga	10.31	Zdeněk Stromšík; SSK Vitkovice	10.39	Štěpán Hampl; PSK Olymp Praga	10.43
200 metres	Jan Jirka; PSK Olymp Praha	20.45 NR	Tomáš Němejc; TJ Sokol České Budějovice	20.53 PB	Jiří Kubeš; TJ Dukla Praha	20.94 PB
400 metres	Matěj Krsek; AC TEPO Kladno	46.40	Patrik Šorm; TJ Dukla Praha	46.47	Pavel Maslák; TJ Dukla Praha	46.60
800 metres	Filip Šnejdr; ASK Slavia Praha	1:46.33 CR	Lukáš Hodboď; TJ Sokol Hradec Králové	1:46.73	Jakub Davidík; TJ Baník Stříbro	1:47.27
1500 metres	Viktor Šinágl; PSK Olymp Praha	3:42.71	Jan Friš; TJ Dukla Praha	3:42.82	Adam Dvořáček; VSK Univerzita Brno	3:43.57
5000 metres	Viktor Šinágl; PSK Olymp Praha	14:17.67	Vladimír Marčík; AK ŠKODA Plzeň	14:23.96 PB	Martin Zajíc; VSK Univerzita Brno	14:30.34
110 metres hurdles	Petr Svoboda; PSK Olymp Praha	13.78	David Ryba; TJ Dukla Praha	14.10	Vilém Stráský; VSK Univerzita Brno	14.49
400 metres hurdles	Vít Müller; TJ Dukla Praha	49.26 PB	Martin Tuček; VSK Univerzita Brno	50.20 PB	Matěj Mach; ASK Slavia Praha	51.55
3000 metres steeplechase	Damián Vích; TJ Dukla Praha	8:53.19	David Foller; VSK Univerzita Brno	8:56.61	Martin Kováčech; SSK Vítkovice	8:59.19
High jump	Marek Bahník; TJ Sokol Hradec Králové	2.20	Jakub Bělík; TJ Sokol Hradec Králové	2.12 =PB	Josef Adámek; AK ŠKODA Plzeň	2.12
Pole vault	Jan Kudlička; TJ Dukla Praha	5.55	Dan Bárta; TJ Dukla Praha	5.45	Matěj Ščerba; Athletic Club Ústí nad Labem	5.35
Long jump	Radek Juška; PSK Olymp Praha	7.88	Jakub Rusek; TJ Dukla Praha	7.53 PB	Dan Kováč; ASK Slavia Praha	7.32
Triple jump	Jiří Vondráček; Hvězda Pardubice	16.08	Ondřej Vodák; VSK Univerzita Brno	15.81	Filip Dittrich; TJ Dukla Praha	15.24
Shot put	Tomáš Staněk; Univerzitní sportovní klub Praha	20.68	Martin Novák; TJ Dukla Praha	18.16	David Tupý; AC TEPO Kladno	17.83
Discus throw	Marek Bárta; PSK Olymp Praha	60.02	Michal Forejt; AK ŠKODA Plzeň	56.48	Jakub Forejt; AK ŠKODA Plzeň	53.89
Hammer throw	Patrik Hájek; TJ Dukla Praha	69.31	Michal Fiala; AC TEPO Kladno	65.49	Miroslav Pavlíček; AC TEPO Kladno	65.13
Javelin throw	Jakub Vadlejch; TJ Dukla Praha	82.04	Vítězslav Veselý; TJ Dukla Praha	81.38	Martin Florian; AC TJ Jičín	71.38
4 × 100 metres relay	PSK Olymp Praha; Antonín Wijas; Adam Havlas; Stanislav Jíra; Štěpán Hampl	40.61	Czech Republic U20; Armin Ntemo; Lukáš Soukal; Matouš Budig; Eduard Kubelík	40.68	AK ŠKODA Plzeň; Petr Urbánek; Marek Páník; Daniel Maruštík; Jakub Rež	40.88
4 × 400 metres relay	ASK Slavia Praha; Matěj Mach; Vladislav Sadirov; Martin Ornst; Filip Šnejdr	3:11.40	AK ŠKODA Plzeň; Jakub Majerčák; Daniel Kabyš; Michal Haidelmeier; Filip Ličman	3:13.42	VSK Univerzita Brno; Martin Juránek; Tomáš Vystrk; Tadeáš Plaček; Martin Tuček	3:14.22

=== Women ===
Event	Gold		Silver		Bronze	
100 metres	Johana Kaiserová; Univerzitní sportovní klub Praha	11.73	Natálie Kožuškaničová; Univerzitní sportovní klub Praha	11.74 PB	Lucie Mičunková; Atletický klub Olomouc	11.84
200 metres	Jana Slaninová; SSK Vítkovice	23.64 PB	Barbora Šplechtnová; PSK Olymp Praha	23.66 PB	Martina Hofmanová; Univerzitní sportovní klub Praha	23.80
400 metres	Barbora Malíková; TJ Sokol Opava	51.23 PB	Tereza Petržilková; AK ŠKODA Plzeň	53.35	Martina Hofmanová; Univerzitní sportovní klub Praha	54.14
800 metres	Kimberley Ficenec; TJ Dukla Praha	2:04.52	Adéla Sádlová; AK Olymp Brno	2:05.07 PB	Anna Šimková; ASK Slavia Praha	2:06.09 PB
1500 metres	Diana Mezuliáníková; PSK Olymp Praha	4:09.66 CR	Kristiina Mäki; PSK Olymp Praha	4:10.59	Simona Vrzalová; SSK Vítkovice	4:11.47
5000 metres	Moira Stewartová; Spartak Praha 4	16:27.62	Tereza Hrochová; AK ŠKODA Plzeň	16:28.10 PB	Aneta Chlebiková; TJ TŽ Třinec	16:40.90
100 metres hurdles	Markéta Štolová; Univerzitní sportovní klub Praha	13.06	Helena Jiranová; Univerzitní sportovní klub Praha	13.12	Lucie Čuda Koudelová; AK Olymp Brno	13.15
400 metres hurdles	Nikoleta Jíchová; TJ Dukla Praha	57.17 PB	Barbora Veselá; Atletika Stará Boleslav	57.69 PB	Tereza Jonášová; AK ŠKODA Plzeň	59.14
3000 metres steeplechase	Tereza Novotná; AK Olymp Brno	10:18.68	Veronika Siebeltová; TJ Slezan Frýdek-Místek	10:37.83 PB	Bára Stýblová; TJ Lokomotiva Beroun	10:43.64
High jump	Klára Krejčiříková; AK Olymp Brno	1.80	Michaela Hrubá; Univerzitní sportovní klub Praha	1.77	Nikola Gavendová; SSK Vítkovice	1.74
Pole vault	Romana Maláčová; Univerzitní sportovní klub Praha	4.45	Amálie Švábíková; Univerzitní sportovní klub Praha	4.45	Zuzana Pražáková; TJ Sokol Kolín-atletika	4.35
Long jump	Linda Suchá; AK ŠKODA Plzeň	6.28	Michaela Kučerová; Univerzitní sportovní klub Praha	6.26	Kateřina Dvořáková; Univerzitní sportovní klub Praha	6.16
Triple jump	Emma Maštalířová; TJ Dukla Praha	13.32 =PB	Petra Harasimová; TJ Sokol Opava	13.27 =PB	Linda Suchá; AK ŠKODA Plzeň	13.11
Shot put	Markéta Červenková; Univerzitní sportovní klub Praha	17.48	Katrin Brzyszkowská; SSK Vítkovice	15.74 PB	Lenka Valešová; AK ŠKODA Plzeň	14.81
Discus throw	Eliška Staňková; AC TEPO Kladno	55.68	Barbora Tichá; AK ŠKODA Plzeň	51.70 PB	Lenka Matoušková; PSK Olymp Praha	48.30
Hammer throw	Kateřina Šafránková; TJ Dukla Praha	69.56	Tereza Králová; Univerzitní sportovní klub Praha	65.57	Lenka Valešová; AK ŠKODA Plzeň	63.87
Javelin throw	Barbora Špotáková; TJ Dukla Praha	61.38	Martina Píšová; TJ Dukla Praha	56.99	Irena Gillarová; TJ Dukla Praha	55.70
4 × 100 metres relay	Univerzitní sportovní klub Praha A Linda Dufková; Nicoleta Turnerová; Martina Hofmanová; Barbora Dvořáková	45.59	Univerzitní sportovní klub Praha B Markéta Štolová; Johana Kaiserová; Agáta Kolingerová; Natálie Kožuškaničová	45.85	Atletický klub Olomouc; Michaela Gieselová; Barbora Zatloukalová; Katrin Sásová; Lucie Mičunková	46.31
4 × 400 metres relay	AK ŠKODA Plzeň; Kateřina Matoušková; Anna Suráková; Tereza Jonášová; Tereza Petržilková	3:40.61	Univerzitní sportovní klub Praha; Věra Holubářová; Veronika Petrásková; Kristýna Korelová; Martina Hofmanová	3:47.41	ASK Slavia Praha; Markéta Veverková; Anna Šimková; Barbora Navrátilová; Zuzana Cymbálová	3:49.41
