= Czech Republic at the 2022 European Championships =

in (Germany) Munich 11 August 2022 – 22 August 2022
- Competitors: 166 in 12 sports
- Medals Ranked 17th: Gold 3 Silver 4 Bronze 3 Total 10

European Championships appearances
- 2018; 2022

Czech Republic competed at the 2022 European Championships in Munich from August 11 to August 22, 2022.

== Medallists ==
Medal	Name	Sport	Event	Date
Gold	Iveta Miculyčová	Cycling	Women's BMX freestyle	12 August
Gold	Adam Ondra	Sport climbing	Men's lead	14 August
Gold	Martin Fuksa	Canoeing	Men's C–1 500 metres	21 August
Silver	Adam Ondra	Sport climbing	Men's boulder & lead	18 August
Silver	Martin Fuksa	Canoeing	Men's C–1 1000 metres	20 August
Silver	Ondřej Perušič David Schweiner	Beach Volleyball	Men's tournament	21 August
Silver	Jakub Vadlejch	Athletics	Men's javelin throw	21 August
Bronze	Adam Ondra	Sport climbing	Men's boulder	13 August
Bronze	Tomáš Staněk	Athletics	Men's shot put	15 August
Bronze	Barbora Špotáková	Athletics	Women's javelin throw	20 August

== Competitors ==
The following is the list of number of competitors in the Championships:

Sport	Men	Women	Total
Artistic Gymnastics (men and women)	1	5	6
Athletics	30	23	53
Beach volleyball	4	0	4
Canoe sprint	18	9	27
Cycling BMX	2	2	4
Cycling mountain bike	4	4	8
Cycling road	6	4	10
Cycling track	12	5	17
Rowing	14	10	24
Sport climbing	6	5	11
Table tennis	5	4	9
Triathlon	3	3	6
Total	98	68	166

== Athletics ==
Czech Republic entered the following athletes.

Key

- Q = Qualified for the next round
- q = Qualified for the next round as a fastest loser or, in field events, by position without achieving the qualifying target
- NR = National record
- PB = Personal best
- SB = Season best
- N/A = Round not applicable for the event

Men
Track and road

Athletes	Event	Heats		Semifinal		Final	
Athletes	Event	Result	Rank	Result	Rank	Result	Rank
Jan Friš	1500 m	3:40.99	19	—N/a		did not advance	
Lukáš Gdula	35 km walk	—N/a				DSQ	
Vít Hlaváč	35 km walk	—N/a				2:37:32	9
Jiří Homoláč	Marathon	—N/a				DNF	
Jan Jirka	200 m	20.84	12 Q	20.80	17	did not advance	
Matěj Krsek	400 m	46.12	16 Q	45.92	16	did not advance	
Eduard Kubelík	200 m	21.25	22	did not advance			
Pavel Maslák	400 m	45.92 SB	13 q	46.36	20	did not advance	
Vít Müller	400 m hurdles	49.86	7 q	49.78	17	did not advance	
Jiří Polák	200 m	20.94	18	did not advance			
Filip Sasínek	1500 m	DNF		—N/a		did not advance	
Filip Šnejdr	800 m	1:48.16	25	did not advance			
Patrik Šorm	400 m	45.66 SB	7 Q	45.66	9	did not advance	
Zdeněk Stromšík	100 m	10.60	16	did not advance			
Martin Tuček	400 m hurdles	50.09	10 q	50.32	21	did not advance	
Damián Vích	3000 m steeplechase	8:41.43	21	—N/a		did not advance	
Zdeněk Stromšík; Jiří Polák; Jan Jirka; David Kolář	4 × 100 m relay	39.41	14	—N/a		did not advance	
Matěj Krsek; Pavel Maslák; Michal Desenský; Patrik Šorm	4 × 400 m relay	3:02.07	5 Q	—N/a		3:01.82	6

Field events

Athletes	Event	Qualification		Final	
Athletes	Event	Distance	Position	Distance	Position
Josef Adámek	High jump	2.12	21	did not advance	
Marek Bárta	Discus throw	58.37	22	did not advance	
Radek Juška	Long jump	7.80	7 q	7.66	9
Martin Konečný	Javelin throw	77.49	9 q	73.48	12
Tomáš Staněk	Shot put	21.39	2 Q	21.26	3rd place, bronze medalist(s)
Jan Štefela	High jump	2.21	10 q	2.18	7
Jakub Vadlejch	Javelin throw	81.81	1 q	87.28	2nd place, silver medalist(s)
Vítězslav Veselý	Javelin throw	79.27	4 q	84.36	4

Combined events – Decathlon

Athlete	Event	100 m	LJ	SP	HJ	400 m	110H	DT	PV	JT	1500 m	Final	Rank
Adam Helcelet	Result	11.13 SB	7.28 SB	15.30	1.99	50.16 SB	14.36 SB	43.44	4.60 SB	63.44 SB	4:47.48 SB	8000 SB	11
Adam Helcelet	Points	832	881	808	794	807	929	735	790	790	634	8000 SB	11
Jiří Sýkora	Result	11.09 SB	6.92	NM	DNS							DNF	
Jiří Sýkora	Points	841	795	0	DNS							DNF	

Women
Track and road

Athletes	Event	Heats		Semifinal		Final	
Athletes	Event	Result	Rank	Result	Rank	Result	Rank
Tereza Ďurdiaková	35 km walk	—N/a				3:01:19	12
Martina Hofmanová	200 m	23.73	23	did not advance			
Tereza Hrochová	Marathon	—N/a				2:36.00	23
Nikoleta Jíchová	400 m hurdles	55.93	2 Q	55.48 PB	11	did not advance	
Helena Jiranová	100 m hurdles	13.50	17	did not advance			
Marcela Joglová	Marathon	—N/a				2:36:26 SB	24
Eva Kubíčková	100 m	11.61	18	did not advance			
Kristiina Mäki	1500 metres	4:04.40	7 q	—N/a		4:05.73	6
Eliška Martínková	20 km walk	—N/a				1:31:44	7
Diana Mezuliáníková	1500 m	4:07.37	15	—N/a		did not advance	
Tereza Petržilková	400 m	52.35	11 q	52.38	18	did not advance	
Moira Stewartová	Marathon	—N/a				2:43:03 SB	43
Lada Vondrová	400 m	—N/a		51.83	14	did not advance	
Eva Kubíčková; Tereza Lamačová; Natálie Kožuškaničová; Johana Kaiserová	4 × 100 metres relay	DNF		—N/a		did not advance	
Tereza Petržilková; Nikoleta Jíchová; Martina Hofmanová; Lada Vondrová	4 × 100 metres relay	DQ		—N/a		did not advance	
Tereza Hrochová; Marcela Joglová; Moira Stewartová	Marathon team	—N/a				7:55:29	7

Field events

Athletes	Event	Qualification		Final	
Athletes	Event	Distance	Position	Distance	Position
Markéta Červenková	Shot put	NM		did not advance	
Nikola Ogrodníková	Javelin throw	57.82	8 q	54.48	12
Barbora Špotáková	Javelin throw	60.75	3 q	60.68	3rd place, bronze medalist(s)
Amálie Švábíková	Pole vault	4.40	14	did not advance	
Nikol Tabačková	Javelin throw	57.54	11 q	57.93	8

Combined events – Heptathlon

Athlete	Event	100H	HJ	SP	200 m	LJ	JT	800 m	Final	Rank
Dorota Skřivanová	Result	13.92	1.77	13.24	24.45	NM	DNS		DNF	
Dorota Skřivanová	Points	990	941	743	938	0	DNS		DNF	

== Beach Volleyball ==
Czech Republic has qualified 2 male pairs.

Athlete	Event	Preliminary round			Round of 24	Round of 16	Quarterfinals	Semifinals	Final / BM	
Athlete	Event	Opposition Score	Opposition Score	Rank	Opposition Score	Opposition Score	Opposition Score	Opposition Score	Opposition Score	Rank
Ondřej Perušič; David Schweiner	Men's	Sowa – Pfretzschner (GER); W 2–1 (26–24, 17–21, 15–9)	Krou – Aye (FRA); W 2–1 (19–21, 21–14, 15–10)	1 Q	Bye	Kantor – Rudol (POL); W 2–1 (21–18, 21–23, 15–12)	Hörl – Horst (AUT); W 2–0 (21–17, 21–19)	Bryl – Łosiak (POL); W 2–0 (21–15, 21–11)	Åhman – Hellvig (SWE); L 0–2 (16–21, 15–21)	2nd place, silver medalist(s)
Jakub Šépka; Tomáš Semerád	Men's	Nicolai – Cottafava (ITA); L 0–2 (15–21, 16–21)	Penninga – Luini (NED); L 0–2 (14–21, 16–21)	4	Did not advance					25

== Canoeing ==
Men

Athlete	Event	Heats		Semifinals		Final	
Athlete	Event	Time	Rank	Time	Rank	Time	Rank
Petr Fuksa	C-1 200 m	40.363	1 F	Bye		40.690	6
Martin Fuksa	C-1 500 m	1:50.406	1 FA	Bye		1:47.183	1st place, gold medalist(s)
Martin Fuksa	C-1 1000 m	3:54.590	2 F	Bye		3:50.032	2nd place, silver medalist(s)
Antonin Hrabal; Jiří Zalubil	C-2 500 m	1:48.807	5 SF	1:43.899	4	Did not advance	10
Martin Sobíšek	K-1 200 m	36.597	5 SF	36.322	4	Did not advance	10
Jakub Zavřel	K-1 500 m	1:43.270	3 SF	1:44.048	1 FA	1:40.792	7
Ondřej Mašek	K-1 1000 m	3:41.929	8	Did not advance			22
Josef Dostál	K-1 5000 m	—N/a				DNF	
Jakub Brabec; Tomáš Sobíšek	K-2 200 m	33.118	5 SF	33.528	4	Did not advance	10
Michal Kulich; Jakub Remuta	K-2 500 m	1:37.038	4 SF	1:32.335	6 FB	1:33.405	13
Vladimir Cerman; Jakub Stejskal	K-2 1000 m	3:19.617	4 SF	3:20.654	4	Did not advance	10
Josef Dostál; Daniel Havel; Radek Šlouf; Jakub Špicar	K-4 500 m	1:21.873	4 SF	1:23.556	8	Did not advance	14
Vilém Kukačka; Michal Kulich; Martin Sobíšek; Tomáš Sobíšek	K-4 1000 m	—N/a				2:58.029	5

Women

Athlete	Event	Heats		Semifinals		Final	
Athlete	Event	Time	Rank	Time	Rank	Time	Rank
Denisa Řáhová	C-1 200 m	51.908	7 SF	49.866	5	Did not advance	11
Denisa Řáhová	C-1 500 m	—N/a				2:18.682	8
Martina Malíková; Alžběta Veverková	C-2 200 m	—N/a				48.853	8
Martina Malíková; Alžběta Veverková	C-2 500 m	—N/a				2:14.836	9
Eliška Betlachová	K-1 200 m	44.060	6 SF	43.340	5	Did not advance	11
Anežka Paloudová	K-1 500 m	1:56.521	3 SF	1:53.540	3 FA	1:57.647	7
Adéla Házová	K-1 1000 m	4:05.447	3 F	Bye		4:07.331	7
Eliška Betlachová	K-1 5000 m	—N/a				23:45.619	8
Barbora Betlachová; Kateřina Zárubová	K-2 500 m	1:50.189	4 SF	1:44.986	4 FB	1:46.572	11
Eliška Betlachová; Adéla Házová	K-2 1000 m	3:54.465	5 SF	4:00.267	3 F	3:43.677	7
Barbora Betlachová; Anežka Paloudová; Štěpánka Sobíšková; Kateřina Zárubová	K-4 500 m	1:36.590	4 SF	1:37.604	5	Did not advance	11

== Cycling ==
=== Road ===
Men

Athlete	Event	Time	Rank
Jan Bárta	Road race	4:39:07	46
Jan Bárta	Time trial	28:57.34	18
Tomáš Bárta	Road race	4:39:07	42
Dominik Neuman	Road race	4:38:49	20
Jakub Otruba	Road race	4:39:04	34
Jakub Otruba	Time trial	29:12.34	22
Zdeněk Štybar	Road race	4:39:02	32
Adam Ťoupalík	Road race	4:39:07	41

Women

Athlete	Event	Time	Rank
Nikola Bajgerová	Road race	3:02:23	66
Markéta Hájková	Road race	3:02:23	65
Tereza Neumanová	Road race	2:59:20	14
Nikola Nosková	Road race	3:02:32	79

=== Track ===
Elimination race

Athlete	Event	Final
Athlete	Event	Rank
Jan Voneš	Men's elimination race	12
Kateřina Kohoutková	Women's elimination race	12

Keirin

Athlete	Event	1st Round	Repechage	2nd Round	Final
Athlete	Event	Rank	Rank	Rank	Rank
Tomáš Bábek	Men's keirin	3 R	1 SF	5 F7-12	7
Matěj Bohuslávek	Men's keirin	4 R	3	Did not advance	
Veronika Jaborníková	Women's keirin	4 R	1 SF	6 F7-12	9

Madison

Athlete	Event	Final	
Athlete	Event	Points	Rank
Daniel Babor; Denis Rugovac	Men's madison	DNF	

Omnium

Athlete	Event	Qualification		Scratch Race		Tempo Race		Elimination Race		Points Race		Total points	Rank
Athlete	Event	Rank	Points	Rank	Points	Rank	Points	Rank	Points	Rank	Points	Total points	Rank
Denis Rugovac	Men's omnium	-6	9	Did not advance									
Petra Ševčíková	Women's omnium	—N/a		12	18	15	12	12	18	14	0	48	13

Points race

Athlete	Event	Final	
Athlete	Event	Points	Rank
Jan Voneš	Men's points race	51	9
Kateřina Kohoutková	Women's points race	DNS	

Scratch

Athlete	Event	Final	
Athlete	Event	Laps down	Rank
Daniel Babor	Men's scratch	-2	16
Petra Ševčíková	Women's scratch	0	6

Sprint

Athlete	Event	Qualification		Round 1	Round 2	Quarterfinals	Semifinals	Final	
Athlete	Event	Time Speed (km/h)	Rank	Opposition Time Speed (km/h)	Opposition Time Speed (km/h)	Opposition Time Speed (km/h)	Opposition Time Speed (km/h)	Opposition Time Speed (km/h)	Rank
Martin Čechman	Men's sprint	9.877; 72.896	11	Žalar (SLO); W 10.256; 70.202	Dörnbach (GER); L	Did not advance			11
Matěj Bohuslávek	Men's sprint	9.995; 72.036	13	Napolitano (ITA); W 10.546; 68.272	Helal (FRA); L	Did not advance			13
Veronika Jaborníková	Women's sprint	10.994; 65.490	15	Bissolati (ITA); W 11.840; 60.810	Hinze (GER); L	Did not advance			15

Team sprint

Athlete	Event	Qualification		Semifinals		Final	
Athlete	Event	Time	Rank	Opponent Results	Rank	Opponent Results	Rank
Tomáš Bábek; Martin Čechman; Matěj Bohuslávek	Men's team sprint	36.256	6 Q	France; L 35.991	6	did not advance	

Time trial

Athlete	Event	Qualifying		Final	
Athlete	Event	Time	Rank	Time	Rank
Tomáš Bábek	Men's 1 km time trial	1:02.127	13	Did not advance	
Robin Wagner	Men's 1 km time trial	1:01.538	11	Did not advance	
Veronika Jaborníková	Women's 500 m time trial	34.688	11	Did not advance	

=== Mountain bike ===
Athlete	Event	Time	Rank
Ondřej Cink	Men's cross-country	1:20:22	17
Lukáš Kobes	Men's cross-country	1:22:08	36
Marek Rauchfuss	Men's cross-country	1:22:54	40
Jan Škarnitzl	Men's cross-country	1:21:45	34
Jitka Čábelická	Women's cross-country	1:37:10	20
Jana Czeczinkarová	Women's cross-country	1:38:26	28
Karla Štěpánová	Women's cross-country	–2 laps	36
Tereza Tvarůžková	Women's cross-country	1:37:37	22

=== BMX freestyle ===
Athlete	Event	Qualification		Final	
Athlete	Event	Points	Rank	Points	Rank
Tomáš Beran	Men's	72.25	7 Q	84.80	4
Martin Habada	Men's	50.35	19	Did not advance	
Kateřina Jalůvková	Women's	25.90	11	Did not advance	
Iveta Miculyčová	Women's	58.10	7 Q	80.00	1st place, gold medalist(s)

== Gymnastics ==
=== Men ===
Czech Republic has entered one male athlete.

Qualification

Athlete	Qualification						Total	Rank
Athlete	Apparatus						Total	Rank
Athlete	F	PH	R	V	PB	HB	Total	Rank
Radomír Sliž	—N/a	12.900	—N/a					

=== Women ===
Qualification

Athlete	Event	Qualification						Final					
Athlete	Event	Apparatus				Total	Rank	Apparatus				Total	Rank
Athlete	Event	V	UB	BB	F	Total	Rank	V	UB	BB	F	Total	Rank
Aneta Holasová	Team	12.800	11.500	10.833	12.566	47.699	40	Did not advance					
Lucie Maříková	Team	—N/a	11.133	—N/a				Did not advance					
Klára Peterková	Team	12.200	11.333	11.766	12.100	47.399	43	Did not advance					
Dominika Ponížilová	Team	12.933	10.400	11.966	12.066	47.365	44	Did not advance					
Lucie Trnková	Team	11.300	—N/a	12.366	12.100	—N/a		Did not advance					
Total	Team	37.933	33.966	36.098	36.766	144.763	14	Did not advance					

== Rowing ==
Men

Athlete	Event	Heats		Repechage		Semifinals		Final	
Athlete	Event	Time	Rank	Time	Rank	Time	Rank	Time	Rank
Jan Cincibuch; Jakub Podrazil	Double sculls	7:09.22	3 SA/B	Bye		6:42.35	4 FB	6:51.51	8
Jan Fleissner; Tomáš Šišma; Dalibor Neděla; Filip Zima	Quadruple sculls	6:23.87	2 SA/B	Bye		6:25.10	5 FB	6:04.18	11
Jiří Šimánek; Miroslav Vraštil	Lightweight double sculls	7:12.71	3 R	6:51.82	1 FA	—N/a		6:42.95	5

Women

Athlete	Event	Heats		Repechage		Semifinals		Final	
Athlete	Event	Time	Rank	Time	Rank	Time	Rank	Time	Rank
Lenka Antošová	Single sculls	9:07.05	2 SA/B	Bye		8:21.50	4 FB	8:25.48	8
Radka Novotníková; Pavlína Flamíková	Coxless pair	8:05.18	4 R	7:48.51	4 FB	—N/a		7:37.40	8
Veronika Činková; Kristýna Neuhortová	Lightweight double sculls	8:02.33	4 R	7:48.70	4 FB	—N/a		7:46.08	11

== Sport climbing ==
Boulder

Athlete	Event	Qualification		Semifinal		Final	
Athlete	Event	Result	Rank	Result	Rank	Result	Rank
Adam Ondra	Men's boulder	3T4z 9 9	13 Q	2T2z 8 7	1 Q	2T2z 12 10	3rd place, bronze medalist(s)
Eliška Adamovská	Women's boulder	3T4z 18 16	15 Q	2T4z 3 13	5 Q	1T2z 4 7	5
Markéta Janošová	Women's boulder	1T2z 1 2	40	Did not advance			
Michaela Smetanová	Women's boulder	0T2z 0 2	43	Did not advance			

Combined

Athlete	Event	Qualification		Final						
Athlete	Event	Total	Rank	Boulder		Lead			Total	Rank
Athlete	Event	Total	Rank	Points	Place	Hold	Points	Place	Total	Rank
Adam Ondra	Men's	1690	1 Q	80.7	1	48+	90.1	2	170.8	2nd place, silver medalist(s)
Eliška Adamovská	Women's	1040	4 Q	39.5	7	44	90.0	4	129.5	5
Markéta Janošová	Women's	33	25	Did not advance						
Michaela Smetanová	Women's	197	16	Did not advance						

Lead

Athlete	Event	Qualification								Semifinal			Final		
Athlete	Event	Hold	Time	Rank	Hold	Time	Rank	Points	Rank	Hold	Time	Rank	Hold	Time	Rank
Adam Ondra	Men's lead	47+	3:17	=1	Top	4:20	=1	2.29	1 Q	43+	4:24	2 Q	37+	3:01	1st place, gold medalist(s)
Šimon Potůček	Men's lead	24+	2:21	=30	19+	2:09	=45	38.78	40	Did not advance					
Štěpán Potůček	Men's lead	22+	2:55	=36	19+	1:54	=45	42.26	42	Did not advance					
Martin Stráník	Men's lead	38+	3:38	=11	40	4:03	=17	15.30	13 Q	36+	4:14	10	Did not advance		
Eliška Adamovská	Men's lead	43+	5:42	11	38+	2:14	=7	9.08	9 Q	24+	3:11	8 Q	37+	4:35	6
Markéta Janošová	Men's lead	26	3:05	=32	23	2:37	=32	33.24	38	Did not advance					
Arina Jurčenko	Men's lead	26	3:59	=32	22	3:10	=37	35.71	39	Did not advance					
Tereza Širůčková	Men's lead	26	4:05	=32	24	1:14	=24	30.02	32	Did not advance					
Michaela Smetanová	Men's lead	35+	4:30	=22	24	2:08	=24	25.22	23 Q	19	2:40	18	Did not advance		

Speed

Athlete	Event	Qualification		Round of 16	Quarterfinal	Semifinal	Final	
Athlete	Event	Time	Rank	Opposition Time	Opposition Time	Opposition Time	Opposition Time	Rank
Petr Burian	Men's	6.650	19	did not advance				
Jan Kříž	Men's	6.359	16 Q	Noya Cardona (ESP); L 6.414	did not advance			

== Table tennis ==
=== Men ===
Athlete	Event	Qualification stage				Preliminary Round 1	Preliminary Round 2	Round of 64	Round of 32	Round of 16	Quarterfinals	Semifinals	Final / BM	
Athlete	Event	Opposition Score	Opposition Score	Opposition Score	Rank	Opposition Score	Opposition Score	Opposition Score	Opposition Score	Opposition Score	Opposition Score	Opposition Score	Opposition Score	Rank
Lubomír Jančařík	Singles	Bye						Jarvis (ENG); W 4–3	Boll (GER); L 0–4	Did not advance				17
Jiří Martinko	Singles	Karabaxhak (KOS); W 3–0	Serdaroglu (AUT); W 3–0	Alexandrov (BUL); W 3–0	1 Q	Bye		Geraldo (POR); L 2–4	Did not advance					33
Tomáš Polanský	Singles	Moullet (SUI); W 3–0	Haug (NOR); L 2–3	—N/a	1 Q	Bye		Pitchford (ENG); L 1–4	Did not advance					33
David Reitšpies	Singles	Szudi (HUN); W 3–1	Giardi (SMR); W 3–0	Naumi (FIN); W 3–1	1 Q	Bye		Apolónia (POR); L 0–4	Did not advance					33
Pavel Širuček	Singles	Krastev (BUL); W 3–0	Zhmudenko (UKR); L 0–3	Smirnov (EST); W 3–2	2 Q	Bye	Zelinka (SVK); W 3–0	Franziska (GER); L 0–4	Did not advance					33
Pavel Širuček; Jiří Martinko	Doubles	—N/a				Bye		—N/a	Rassenfosse (BEL) / Haug (NOR); W 3–1	Habesohn / Gardos (AUT); L 2–3	Did not advance			9
Tomáš Polanský; Darko Jorgić (SLO)	Doubles	—N/a				Bye		—N/a	Levajac (SRB) / Putintica (MDA); L 2–3	Did not advance				17

=== Women ===
Athlete	Event	Qualification stage				Preliminary Round 1	Preliminary Round 2	Round of 64	Round of 32	Round of 16	Quarterfinals	Semifinals	Final / BM	
Athlete	Event	Opposition Score	Opposition Score	Opposition Score	Rank	Opposition Score	Opposition Score	Opposition Score	Opposition Score	Opposition Score	Opposition Score	Opposition Score	Opposition Score	Rank
Zdena Blašková	Singles	Mischek (AUT); L 2–3	Rodríguez (ESP); W 3–1	—N/a	2 Q	Bye	Skåttet (NOR); W 3–1	Szőcs (ROU); L 0–4	Did not advance					33
Hana Matelová	Singles	Bye						Jeger (CRO); W 4–2	Piccolin (ITA); L 2–4	Did not advance				17
Markéta Ševčíková	Singles	Šurjan (SRB); W 3–1	Monfardini (ITA); W 3–0	—N/a	1 Q	Bye		Källberg (SWE); L 0–4	Did not advance					33
Kateřina Tomanovská	Singles	Mešetović (BIH); W 3–0	Bergand (SWE); W 3–2	Zeqiri (KOS); W Walkover	1 Q	Bye		Wan (GER); L 2–4	Did not advance					33
Kateřina Tomanovská; Zdena Blašková	Doubles	—N/a				Bye		—N/a	Vignjević / Lupulesku (SRB); L 1–3	Did not advance				17
Hana Matelová; Barbora Balážová (SVK)	Doubles	—N/a				Bye		—N/a	Yovkova / Trifonova (BUL); W 3–0	Mischek (AUT) / Ho (ENG); W 3–0	Samara / Dragoman (ROU); L 0–3	Did not advance		5
Markéta Ševčíková; Amelie Solja (AUT)	Doubles	—N/a				Bye	Zhang (ESP) / Degraef (BEL); W 3–0	—N/a	Bergand / Muskantor (SWE); L 1–3	Did not advance				17

=== Mixed ===
Athlete	Event	Preliminary Round 1	Preliminary Round 2	Round of 32	Round of 16	Quarterfinals	Semifinals	Final / BM	
Athlete	Event	Opposition Score	Opposition Score	Opposition Score	Opposition Score	Opposition Score	Opposition Score	Opposition Score	Rank
Lubomír Jančařík; Zdena Blašková	Doubles	Bye	Mladenovic / Ni (LUX); L 0–3	did not advance					33
David Reitšpies; Kateřina Tomanovská	Doubles	Bye	Kulczycki / Węgrzyn (POL); L 0–3	did not advance					33

== Triathlon ==
=== Men ===
Athlete	Event	Swim (1.5 km)	Trans 1	Bike (40 km)	Trans 2	Run (10 km)	Total Time	Rank
Radim Grebík	Men's	18:45	0:33	53:49	0:21	35:21	1:48:49	46
David Martin	Men's	18:16	0:34	51:33	0:22	37:29	1:48:14	44
Jan Volár	Men's	18:28	0:31	DNF				

=== Women ===
Athlete	Event	Swim (1.5 km)	Trans 1	Bike (40 km)	Trans 2	Run (10 km)	Total Time	Rank
Heidi Juránková	Women's	20:54	0:34	58:53	0:28	39:43	2:00:32	35
Petra Kuříková	Women's	19:39	0:35	DNF				
Tereza Zimovjanová	Women's	20:42	0:36	59:02	0:27	36:53	1:57:40	23

=== Mixed ===
Athlete	Event	Swim (300 m)	Trans 1	Bike (6.8 km)	Trans 2	Run (2 km)	Total Group Time	Rank
Radim Grebík; Heidi Juránková; Jan Volár; Tereza Zimovjanová	Mixed relay	16:14	2:58	47:18	1:43	21:05	1:29:26	13
