= 2019 Czech Indoor Athletics Championships =

- Dates: 16–17 February
- Host city: Ostrava, Czech Republic
- Venue: Ostravar Aréna
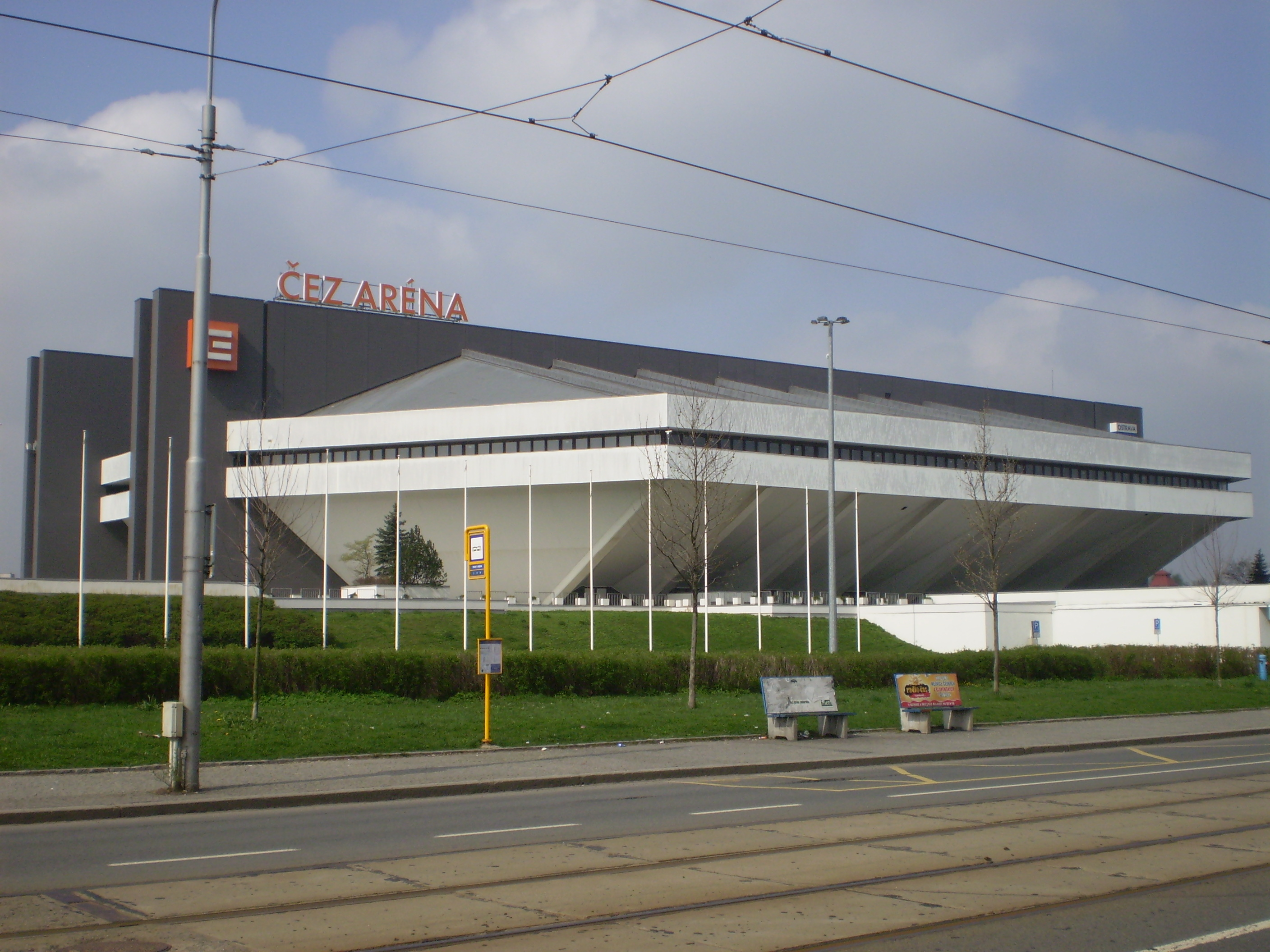
- Events: 26

The 2019 Czech Indoor Athletics Championships (Czech: Halové mistrovství České republiky v atletice 2019) was the 27th edition of the national indoor track and field championships for the Czech Republic. It was held on 16 and 17 February at the Ostravar Aréna in Ostrava, the same venue as the annual Czech Indoor Gala.

The combined track and field events were held from 8–10 February in Prague.

== Results ==
=== Men ===
Event	Gold		Silver		Bronze	
60 metres	Zdeněk Stromšík	6.64	Pavel Maslák	6.76	Jan Veleba	6.77
200 metres	Daniel Vejražka	21.50	Michal Tlustý	21.53	Tomáš Němejc	21.56
400 metres	Jan Tesař	46.70	Patrik Šorm	46.83	Michal Desenský	46.95
800 metres	Filip Šnejdr	1:48.38	Tomáš Vystrk	1:49.15	Vojtěch Mlynář	1:50.43
1500 metres	Filip Sasínek	3:44.02	Daniel Kotyza	3:46.29	Adam Dvořáček	3:49.86
3000 metres	Jan Friš	8:22.09	Damián Vích	8:26.51	Jáchym Kovář	8:27.92
60 m hurdles	Michal Brož	7.94	Jiří Sýkora	7.95	Marek Lukáš	8.09
High jump	Marek Bahník	2.20 m	Matyáš Dalecký	2.12 m	Petr Pícha	2.08 m
Pole vault	Michal Balner	5.22 m	Jan Kudlička	5.22 m	Matěj Ščerba	5.22 m
Long jump	Radek Juška	7.88 m	Adam Pekárek	7.39 m	Tomáš Kratochvíl	7.29 m
Triple jump	Jiří Vondráček	16.03 m	Ondřej Vodák	15.42 m	Zdeněk Kubát	15.21 m
Shot put	Ladislav Prášil	19.34 m	Martin Novák	19.20 m	Jan Touš	17.02 m
Heptathlon	Jiří Sýkora	6006 pts	Jan Doležal	5907 pts	Marek Lukáš	5619 pts

=== Women ===
Event	Gold		Silver		Bronze	
60 metres	Klára Seidlová	7.26	Nikola Bendová	7.50	Lucie Domská	7.57
200 metres	Jana Slaninová	23.81	Barbora Šplechttnová	23.86	Barbora Dvořáková	24.14
400 metres	Lada Vondrová	52.67	Zuzana Hejnová	53.03	Tereza Petržilková	53.44
800 metres	Diana Mezuliáníková	2:02.50	Simona Vrzalová	2:02.94	Lenka Masná	2:04.38
1500 metres	Simona Vrzalová	4:27.35	Renata Vocásková	4:30.52	Anna Málková	4:32.88
3000 metres	Kristiina Mäki	9:21.43	Lucie Sekanová	9:23.12	Tereza Hrochová	9:43.45
60 m hurdles	Helena Jiranová	8.31	Lucie Koudelová	8.31	Kateřina Dvořáková	8.37
High jump	Michaela Hrubá	1.90 m	Klára Krejčiříková	1.87 m	Bára Sajdoková	1.81 m
Pole vault	Romana Maláčová	4.35 m	Amálie Švábíková	4.17 m	Nikol Jiroutová	4.02 m
Long jump	Anna Křížková	6.10 m	Eliška Klučinová	5.98 m	Michaela Kučerová	5.97 m
Triple jump	Emma Maštalířová	12.90 m	Šárka Vachata	12.54 m	Ivana Reicheltová	12.07 m
Shot put	Markéta Červenková	16.58 m	Gabriela Pallová	15.46 m	Jana Kárníková	15.04 m
Pentathlon	Eliška Klučinová	4662 pts	Kateřina Dvořáková	4062 pts	Barbora Dvořáková	3965 pts
