= 2020 Czech Indoor Athletics Championships =

- Dates: 22–23 February
- Host city: Ostrava, Czech Republic
- Venue: Ostravar Aréna
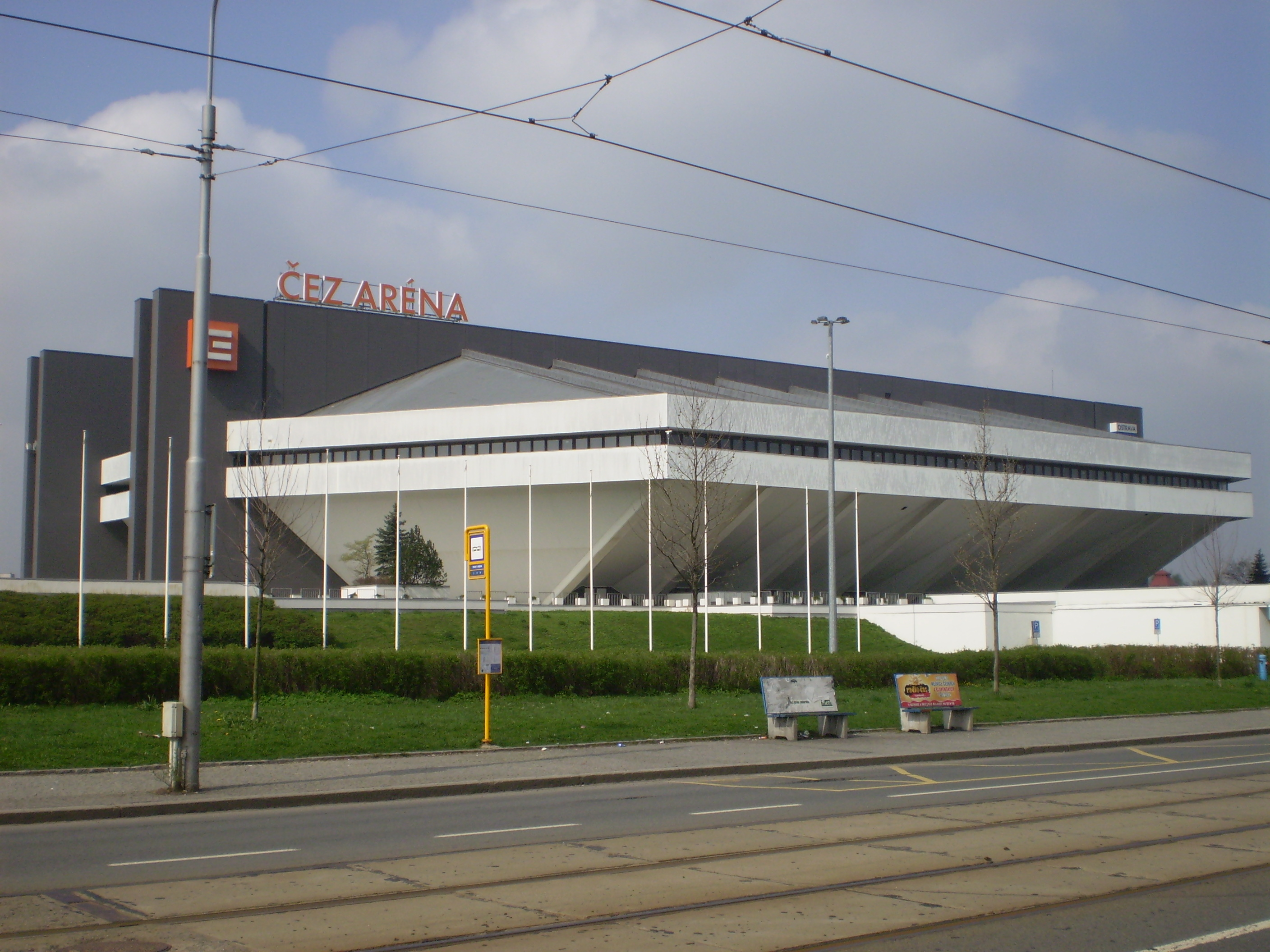
- Events: 26

The 2020 Czech Indoor Athletics Championships (Czech: Halové mistrovství České republiky v atletice 2020) was the 28th edition of the national indoor track and field championships for the Czech Republic. It was held on 22 and 23 February at the Ostravar Aréna in Ostrava, the same venue as the annual Czech Indoor Gala.

The combined track and field events were held separately from 7–9 February in Prague.

== Results ==
=== Men ===
Event	Gold		Silver		Bronze	
60 metres	Zdeněk Stromšík	6.64 CR=	Vojtěch Kolarčík	6.76	Jan Jirka	6.82
200 metres	Eduard Kubelík	21.26	Jiří Kubeš	21.36 PB	Vít Müller	21.36
400 metres	Pavel Maslák	46.12	Michal Desenský	46.36 PB	Patrik Šorm	46.41 PB
800 metres	Lukáš Hodboď	1:47.81 MR	Filip Šnejdr	1:48.32	Tomáš Vystrk	1:48.39 PB
1500 metres	Jan Friš	3:43.88	Daniel Kotyza	3:44.33 PB	Jan Sýkora	3:51.98
3000 metres	Damián Vích	8:21.84	Jáchym Kovář	8:22.31	David Foller	8:22.61
60 m hurdles	Petr Svoboda	7.66	David Ryba	7.98 PB=	Ondřej Kopecký	8.11
High jump	Marek Bahník	2.25 m	Jakub Bělík	2.08 m	Josef Adámek	2.08 m
Pole vault	Jan Kudlička	5.54 m	Matěj Ščerba	5.33 m	Dan Bárta	5.22 m
Long jump	Radek Juška	7.62 m	Tomáš Kratochvíl	7.41 m	Adam Pekárek	7.30 m
Triple jump	Jiří Vondráček	15.37 m	Zdeněk Kubát	15.29 m	Bohumil Bětuňák	14.81 m
Shot put	Tomáš Staněk	21.18 m	Martin Novák	19.02 m	Jakub Héža	17.39 m
Heptathlon	Ondřej Kopecký	5889 pts	Adam Helcelet	5782 pts	Radoš Rykl	5385 pts
4 × 200 m relay	TJ Dukla Praha; Maslák P. Šorm P. Macík O. Ryba D.	1:24.31	TJ Dukla Praha; Rusek J. Kubeš J. Saleh H. Müller V.	1:26.24	ASK Slavia Praha; Svoboda V. Grabmüller A. Valášek J. Šnejdr F.	1:27.35

=== Women ===
Event	Gold		Silver		Bronze	
60 metres	Klára Seidlová	7.27	Nikola Bendová	7.41	Adéla Novotná	7.47
200 metres	Lada Vondrová	23.77	Martina Hofmanová	23.90	Barbora Šplechtnová	24.19
400 metres	Lada Vondrová	51.82 MR	Martina Hofmanová	55.25	Tereza Jonášová	55.53
800 metres	Diana Mezuliáníková	2:07.99	Anna Šimková	2:09.08	Pavla Štoudková	2:10.41
1500 metres	Diana Mezuliáníková	4:27.11	Kristiina Mäki	4:27.36	Simona Vrzalová	4:27.67
3000 metres	Lucie Sekanová	9:26.78	Tereza Novotná	9:31.09	Lucie Maršánová	9:39.51
60 m hurdles	Markéta Štolová	8.21 PB	Lucie Koudelová	8.27	Helena Jiranová	8.32
High jump	Klára Krejčiříková	1.86 m	Bára Sajdoková	1.86 m	Lada Pejchalová	1.80 m
Pole vault	Romana Maláčová	4.45 m	Zuzana Pražáková	4.19 m	Amálie Švábíková	4.06 m
Long jump	Tereza Elena Šínová	6.17 m	Pavlína Minářová	6.10 m	Barbora Hůlková	6.08 m
Triple jump	Emma Maštalířová	12.76 m	Karolína Černá	12.62 m	Linda Průšová	12.16 m
Shot put	Markéta Červenková	16.81 m	Marta Zachařová	14.09 m	Michaela Trčová	13.91 m
Pentathlon	Kateřina Dvořáková	4147 pts	Barbora Zatloukalová	4029 pts	Denisa Majerová	3926 pts
4 × 200 m relay	TJ LIAZ Jablonec; Rappová F. Štanclová V. Hůlková B. Novotná A.	1:37.46 NR	AK ŠKODA Plzeň; Hettlerová L. Jonášová T. Majerová D. Suchá L.	1:38.30	SSK Vítkovice; Falharová P. Kolářová Š. Suchánková B. Slaninová J.	1:42.06
