= 2021 Czech Indoor Athletics Championships =

- Dates: 20–21 February
- Host city: Ostrava, Czech Republic
- Venue: Ostravar Aréna
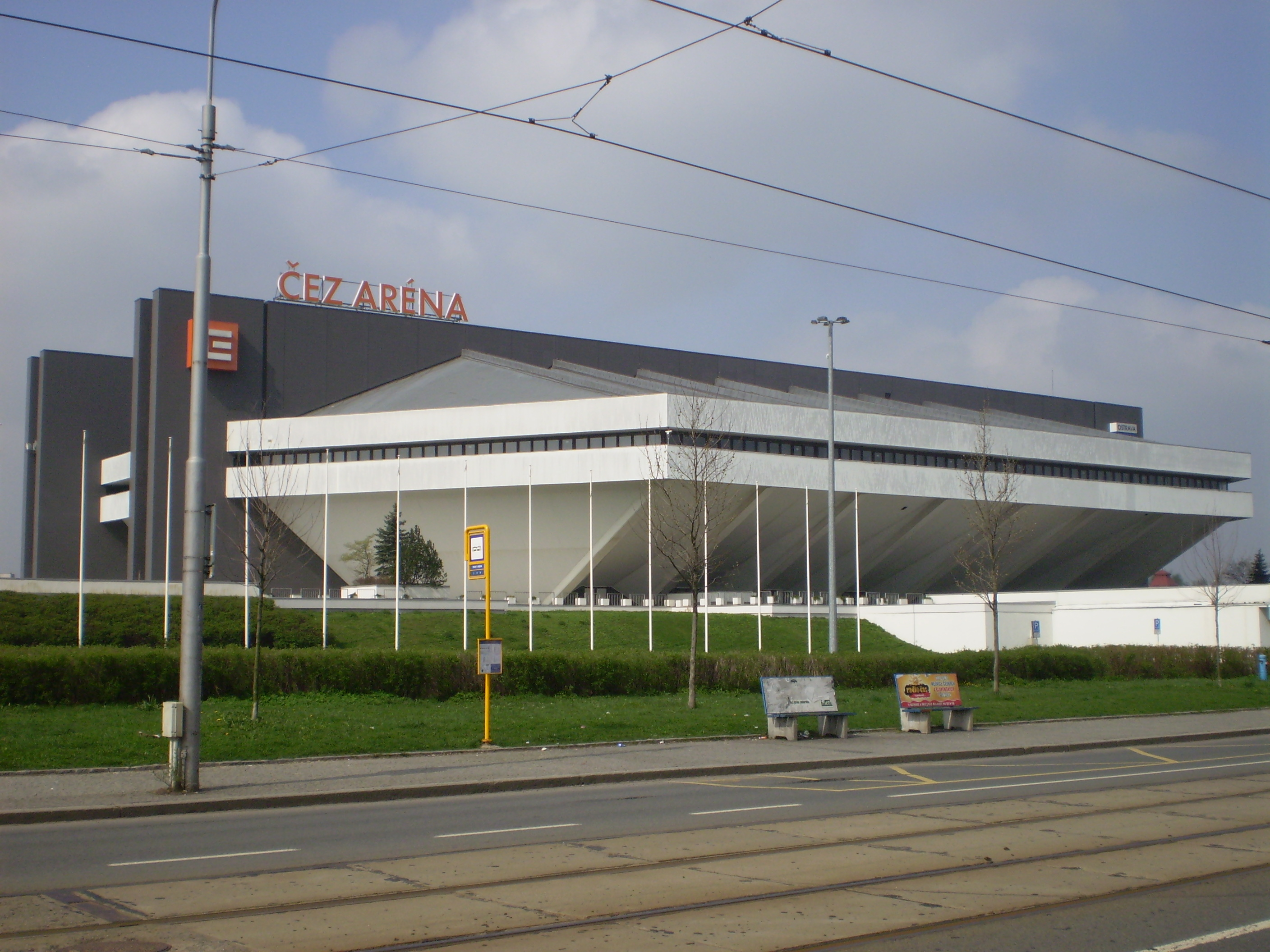
- Events: 26
- Participation: 273 athletes

The 2021 Czech Indoor Athletics Championships (Czech: Halové mistrovství České republiky v atletice 2021) was the 29th edition of the national indoor track and field championships for the Czech Republic. It was held on 20 and 21 February at the Ostravar Aréna in Ostrava.

The combined track and field events were held separately from 13 to 14 February in Prague.

== Results ==
=== Men ===
Event	Gold		Silver		Bronze	
60 metres	Jan Veleba	6.66	Zdeněk Stromšík	6.69	Štěpán Hampl	6.72
200 metres	Pavel Maslák	20.84	Jan Jirka	20.92	Jiří Polák	20.99
400 metres	Vít Müller	46.31	Patrik Šorm	46.58	Jan Tesař	47.52
800 metres	Tomáš Vystrk	1:48.75	Filip Šnejdr	1:48.75	Lukáš Hodboď	1:49.07
1500 metres	Filip Sasínek	3:46.15	Adam Dvořáček	3:51.26	Marek Kalous	3:51.98
3000 metres	Jan Friš	7:57.72	Jakub Holuša	8:12.70	Jáchym Kovář	8:13.52
60 m hurdles	Petr Svoboda	7.70	David Holý	8.15	Martin Janský	8.15
Sztafeta 4 × 200 m	Dukla Praha; Vít Müller; Ondřej Macík; Jakub Rusek; Matyáš Koška	1:26.49	Slavia Praha; Dan Kováč; Martin Růžička; Matěj Mach; Josef Drahota	1:28.43	AK ŠKODA Plzeň; Daniel Maruštík; Marek Páník; Ondřej Míka; Jan Procházka	1:28.57
High jump	Jakub Bělík	2.17	Jan Štefela	2.13	Marek Bahník; Ondřej Vodák	2.08
Pole vault	Jan Kudlička	5.43	Matěj Ščerba	5.32	Dan Bárta	5.21
Long jump	Jakub Bystroň	7.44	Jakub Rusek	7.26	iří Vondráček	7.26
Triple jump	Jiří Vondráček	15.86	Ondřej Vodák	15.61	Zdeněk Kubát	15.37
Shot put	Tadeáš Procházka	18.35	Martin Novák	18.32	Michal Forejt	17.19
Heptathlon	Adam Helcelet	5913	Ondřej Kopecký	5656	František Doubek	5412

=== Women ===
Event	Gold		Silver		Bronze	
60 metres	Marcela Pírková	7.34	Eva Kubíčková	7.47	Johana Kaiserová	7.50
200 metres	Marcela Pírková	23.24	Barbora Šplechtnová	23.68	Nikoleta Jíchová	23.97
400 metres	Lada Vondrová	52.20	Tereza Petržilková	53.48	Zdeňka Seidlová	54.86
800 metres	Kimberley Ficenec	2:06.57	Vendula Hluchá	2:06.73	Kateřina Hálová	2:07.68
1500 metres	Diana Mezuliáníková	4:20.24	Lucie Sekanová	4:27.99	Pavla Štoudková	4:28.12
3000 metres	Lucie Sekanová	9:30.44	Karolína Sasynová	9:34.83	Julia-Anna Lily Bell	9:39.76
60 m hurdles	Helena Jiranová	8.22	Markéta Štolová	8.30	Kateřina Dvořáková	8.44
Sztafeta 4 × 200 m	Emma Maštalířová; Zdeňka Seidlová; Pavlína Minářová; Nikoleta Jíchová	1:38.81	AK ŠKODA Plzeň; Linda Suchá; Barbara Píchalová; Kateřina Salcmanová; Kateřina Matoušková	1:40.38	Sokol SG Plzeň-Petřín; Klára Sobotková; Anežka Voříšková; Eliška Vébrová; Lucie Zavadilová	1:41.54
High jump	Michaela Hrubá	1.84	Denisa Pešová	1.80	Klára Krejčiříková	1.75
Pole vault	Amálie Švábíková	4.26	Zuzana Pražáková Tereza Schejbalová	4.03	Not awarded	
Long jump	Linda Suchá	6.15	Barbora Dvořáková	6.04	Dorota Skřivanová	6.01
Triple jump	Emma Maštalířová	13.28	Linda Suchá	13.24	Petra Harasimová	12.77
Shot put	Markéta Červenková	17.92	Katrin Brzyszkowská	15.32	Lenka Valešová	14.80
Pentathlon	Dorota Skřivanová	4238	Kateřina Dvořáková	4211	Anna Kerbachová	3866
