= Czech Republic Marathon Championships =

Annual national championships for marathon

- Location: Czech Republic
- Event type: Road
- Distance: Marathon
- Established: 1993
- Course records: Men: 2:12:35 (Róbert Štefko, 2004); Women: 2:27:00 (Alena Peterková, 1995)

The Czech Republic Marathon Championships is the annual national championships for marathon running in the Czech Republic. The race serves as a way of designating the Czech national champion for the marathon. The race was first contested in 1993 for both men and women. The championships have been held at different venues, but since 1998 all events have taken place in the capital city of Prague.

The fastest time recorded in the Czech Republic Marathon Championships is 2:12:35 by Róbert Štefko during the Prague Marathon in 2004. The record women's time, set in 1995 in Pardubice, is 2:27:00 by Alena Peterková. Athletes with the most championships are Petra Pastorová, with six women's titles, and Petr Pechek, with five men's titles. The only other runner with five titles is Ivana Martincová.

== Venue ==
Since 1998, the championships have taken place in Prague as part of the Prague Marathon, with the exception of 2020, when no race was held, and 2021, when an elite-only event titled Battle of the Teams was held in Prague instead of the open race. Prior to 1998, the Ostrava Marathon served as the championship race in 1996, and the Mělnik Marathon was a one-time host of the race in 1997.

== Men's results ==
Year	Location	Venue	Czech winner	Time
2025	Prague	Prague Marathon	Yann Havlena	2:21:12
2024	Prague	Prague Marathon	Martin Edlman	2:22:19
2023	Prague	Prague Marathon	Vít Pavlišta (4)	2:19:14
2022	Prague	Prague Marathon	Jiří Homoláč (3)	2:18:43
2021	Prague	Battle of the Teams	Vít Pavlišta (3)	2:18:28
2020	—	—	—	—
2019	Prague	Prague Marathon	Vít Pavlišta (2)	2:16:30
2018	Prague	Prague Marathon	Jiří Homoláč (2)	2:20:09
2017	Prague	Prague Marathon	Petr Pechek (5)	2:21:22
2016	Prague	Prague Marathon	Petr Pechek (4)	2:22:14
2015	Prague	Prague Marathon	Vít Pavlišta	2:17:51
2014	Prague	Prague Marathon	Petr Pechek (3)	2:21:41
2013	Prague	Prague Marathon	Jiří Homoláč	2:21:37
2012	Prague	Prague Marathon	Jan Kreisinger	2:16:26
2011	Prague	Prague Marathon	Petr Pechek (2)	2:18:28
2010	Prague	Prague Marathon	Petr Pechek	2:22:18
2009	Prague	Prague Marathon	Mulugeta Serbessa	2:27:16
2008	Prague	Prague Marathon	Róbert Štefko (2)	2:23:53
2007	Prague	Prague Marathon	Pavel Faschingbauer (2)	2:18:55
2006	Prague	Prague Marathon	Pavel Faschingbauer	2:17:13
2005	Prague	Prague Marathon	Jan Bláha (4)	2:17:59
2004	Prague	Prague Marathon	Róbert Štefko	2:12:35
2003	Prague	Prague Marathon	Jan Bláha (3)	2:22:21
2002	Prague	Prague Marathon	Jiří Wallenfels	2:25:52
2001	Prague	Prague Marathon	Jan Bláha (2)	2:15:54
2000	Prague	Prague Marathon	Jan Bláha	2:18:43
1999	Prague	Prague Marathon	Pavel Kryška (2)	2:19:19
1998	Prague	Prague Marathon	Pavel Kryška	2:17:13
1997	Mělník	Mělník Marathon	Václav Ožana	2:29:58
1996	Ostrava	Ostrava Marathon	Vlastimil Bukovjan	2:22:48
1995	Pardubice		Petr Bukovjan	2:20:33
1994	Pardubice		Petr Klimeš	2:18:28
1993	Otrokovice		Rudolf Jun	2:19:19

=== Multiple winners ===
Petr Pechek is a five-time marathon champion, more than anybody else. He celebrated his fifth win in 2017 at the age of 34.

Multiple winners of the men's Czech Republic Marathon Championships
Runner	Total	Years
Petr Pechek	5	2010, 2011, 2014, 2016, 2017
Jan Bláha	4	2000, 2001, 2003, 2005
Vít Pavlišta	4	2015, 2019, 2021, 2023
Jiří Homoláč	3	2013, 2018, 2022
Pavel Kryška	2	1998, 1999
Pavel Faschingbauer	2	2006, 2007
Róbert Štefko	2	2004, 2008

== Women's results ==
Year	Location	Venue	Czech winner	Time
2025	Prague	Prague Marathon	Tereza Hrochová	2:34:04
2024	Prague	Prague Marathon	Petra Pastorová (6)	2:47:04
2023	Prague	Prague Marathon	Moira Stewartová	2:31:54
2022	Prague	Prague Marathon	Marcela Joglová	2:39:23
2021	Prague	Battle of the Teams	Eva Vrabcová-Nývltová (2)	2:27:07
2020	—	—	—	—
2019	Prague	Prague Marathon	Petra Pastorová (5)	2:42:22
2018	Prague	Prague Marathon	Petra Pastorová (4)	2:48:40
2017	Prague	Prague Marathon	Petra Pastorová (3)	2:46:34
2016	Prague	Prague Marathon	Eva Vrabcová-Nývltová	2:30:10
2015	Prague	Prague Marathon	Šárka Macháčková	2:51:01
2014	Prague	Prague Marathon	Kateřina Kriegelová	2:51:07
2013	Prague	Prague Marathon	Petra Pastorová (2)	2:36:44
2012	Prague	Prague Marathon	Petra Pastorová	2:39:42
2011	Prague	Prague Marathon	Radka Churaňová (3)	2:53:12
2010	Prague	Prague Marathon	Radka Churaňová (2)	2:59:24
2009	Prague	Prague Marathon	Ivana Martincová (5)	2:27:16
2008	Prague	Prague Marathon	Ivana Martincová (4)	2:23:53
2007	Prague	Prague Marathon	Veronika Brychcínová	2:40:50
2006	Prague	Prague Marathon	Ivana Martincová (3)	2:51:50
2005	Prague	Prague Marathon	Ivana Martincová (2)	2:58:00
2004	Prague	Prague Marathon	Radka Churaňová	2:45:29
2003	Prague	Prague Marathon	Ivana Martincová	2:50:42
2002	Prague	Prague Marathon	Jana Klimešová	2:47:24
2001	Prague	Prague Marathon	Alena Peterková (4)	2:37:07
2000	Prague	Prague Marathon	Alena Peterková (3)	2:31:08
1999	Prague	Prague Marathon	Táňa Metelková	2:58:05
1998	Prague	Prague Marathon	Karla Mališová	3:00:33
1997	Mělník	Mělník Marathon	Not awarded (Note: Vlasta Ruclová was the first woman finisher in 1997 with a time of 3:14:52. A champion wasn't declared that year as there were only two competitors.)	
1996	Ostrava	Ostrava Marathon	Not awarded (Note: Kateřina Gerová was the first woman finisher in 1996 with a time of 3:29:47. A champion wasn't declared that year as there was only one entrant.)	
1995	Pardubice		Alena Peterková (2)	2:27:00
1994	Pardubice		Not awarded (Note: Alena Peterková was the first woman finisher in 1994 with a time of 2:31:47. A champion wasn't declared that year as there were only two competitors.)	
1993	Otrokovice		Alena Peterková	3:02:04

=== Multiple winners ===
Petra Pastorová has the most wins in the championship, having recorded her sixth women's title in 2024, and won three consecutively between 2017 and 2019. Iva Martincová won her fifth title at the age of 46 in 2009.

Multiple winners of the women's Czech Republic Marathon Championships
Runner	Total	Years
Petra Pastorová	6	2012, 2013, 2017, 2018, 2019, 2024
Ivana Martincová	5	2003, 2005, 2006, 2008, 2009
Alena Peterková	4	1993, 1995, 2000, 2001
Radka Churaňová	3	2004, 2010, 2011
Eva Vrabcová-Nývltová	2	2016, 2021

== Records ==
Men's Czech Republic Marathon Championships event record
Year	Location	Venue	Runner	Time
2004	Prague	Prague Marathon	Róbert Štefko	2:12:35

Women's Czech Republic Marathon Championships event record
Year	Location	Venue	Runner	Time
1995	Pardubice		Alena Peterková	2:27:00

== See also ==
- Czech Athletics Championships
- Czech Indoor Athletics Championships
