= Czech Athletics Championships =

Annual outdoor track and field competition

Czech Athletics Championships Mistrovství ČR v atletice
- Sport: Athletics
- Founded: 1970
- Country: Czech Republic
- Official website: www.atletika.cz

The Czech Athletics Championships (Czech: Mistrovství ČR v atletice) is an annual outdoor track and field competition organised by the Czech Athletics Federation, which serves at the national championship for the sport in the Czech Republic. It superseded the Czechoslovak Athletics Championships as the national championship in 1993, though the competition was hosted as a sub-national event prior to then. A Czech Championships was held in 1970, separate from the Czechoslovak event that year.

== Editions ==
Year	Place	Dates
1970	Dvůr Králové nad Labem	
1993	Jablonec nad Nisou	3–4 July
1994	Jablonec nad Nisou	9–10 July
1995	Ostrava	5–6 July
1996	Prague	7–8 September
1997	Třinec	5–6 July
1998	Jablonec nad Nisou	11–12 July
1999	Ostrava	26–27 June
2000	Plzeň	15–16 July
2001	Jablonec nad Nisou	30 June–1 July
2002	Ostrava	19–21 July
2003	Olomouc	11–13 July
2004	Plzeň	25–26 June
2005	Kladno	2–3 July
2006	Prague	24–25 June
2007	Třinec	30 June–1 July
2008	Tábor	4–5 July
2009	Prague	27–28 June
2010	Třinec	17–18 July
2011	Brno	2–3 July
2012	Vyškov	16–17 June
2013	Tábor	15–16 June
2014	Ostrava	2–3 August
2015	Plzeň	27–28 June
2016	Tábor	17–19 June
2017	Třinec	10–11 June
2018	Kladno	28–29 July
2019	Brno	26–27 July
2020	Plzeň	8–9 August
2021	Zlín	26–27 June
2023	Tábor	29–30 July

== Championship records ==
=== Men ===
Event	Record	Athlete/ Team	Date	Meet	Place	Ref.
100 m	10.16 (+1.6 m/s)	Jan Veleba	26 July 2019	2019 Championships	Brno	
200 m	20.39 (+0.2 m/s) NR	Ondřej Macík	24 July 2022	2023 Championships	Tábor	
400 m	45.82	Karel Bláha	2000	2000 Championships		
800 m	1:46.94	Filip Šnejdr	27 June 2021	2021 Championships	Zlín	
1500 m	3:36.72	Filip Sasínek	August 2020	2020 Championships	Plzeň	
5000 m	13:45.63	Jan Pešava	1993			
10,000 m	28:41.55	Jan Pešava	1995			
110 m hurdles	13.29	Petr Svoboda	2008			
400 m hurdles	48.92	Jiří Mužík	2002			
3000 m steeplechase	8:37.92	Michael Nejedlý	1995			
High jump	2.33 m	Svatoslav Ton; Tomáš Janků	2004			
Pole vault	5.75 m	Adam Ptáček	2006			
Long jump	8.10 m	Radek Juška	August 2020	2020 Championships	Plzeň	
Triple jump	17.29 m	Jiří Kuntoš	1999			
Shot put	21.61 m	Tomáš Staněk	11 June 2017		Třinec	
Discus throw	67.13 m	Libor Malina	2001			
Hammer throw	80.98 m	Vladimír Maška	2000			
Javelin throw	88.46 m	Jan Železný	1996			
4 × 100 m relay	39.38	Sparta Praha	1986			
4 × 400 m relay	3:05.31	Dukla Praha	2012			

=== Women ===
Event	Record	Athlete/Team	Date	Meet	Place	Ref.
100 m	11.32	Kateřina Čechová	2012			
200 m	23.03	Erika Suchovská	1995			
400 m	50.88	Helena Fuchsová	1999			
800 m	1:59.55	Ludmila Formanová	2000			
1500 m	4:09.66	Diana Mezuliáníková	27 June 2021	2021 Championships	Zlín	
5000 m	15:54.10	Michaela Mannová	2003			
10,000 m	32:27.68	Alena Peterková	2000			
100 m hurdles	12.90	Lucie Škrobáková	2010			
400 m hurdles	54.38	Denisa Rosolová	2012			
3000 m steeplechase	9:49.40	Jana Biolková	2003			
High jump	1.95 m	Zuzana Hlavoňová	2000			
Pole vault	4.66 m	Jiřina Ptáčníková	2010			
Long jump	6.68 m	Denisa Ščerbová	2004			
Triple jump	14.42 m	Šárka Kašpárková	1996			
Shot put	21.30 m	Helena Fibingerová	1976			
Discus throw	65.85 m	Věra Cechlová	2003			
Hammer throw	67.86 m	Lucie Vrbenská	2003			
Javelin throw	67.58 m	Barbora Špotáková	2009			
4 × 100 m relay	44.61	PSK Olymp Praha	2011			
4 × 400 m relay	3:30.70	USK Praha	1983			

== See also ==
- Czech Indoor Athletics Championships
- Czech Republic Marathon Championships
- List of Czech records in athletics
