= Daniel Kotyza =

Czech athlete (born 2000)

Personal information
- Nationality: Czech
- Born: 5 October 2000 (age 25)

Sport
- Sport: Athletics
- Event(s): 800m, 1500m

Achievements and titles
- Personal best(s): 800m: 1:46.57 (Ostrava, 2024); 1500m: 3:44.33 (Ostrava, 2020)

Daniel Kotyza (born 5 October 2000) is a Czech middle-distance runner. He has won Czech national indoor championship titles over 800 metres and 1500 metres. He competed at the 2025 World Athletics Indoor Championships and has competed at the European Cross Country Championships.

== Career ==
He finished fourth at the Czech Athletics Championships over 800 metres in July 2019 in Brno, running 1:51.39. He won the Uhřice Circle - Run around Uhřice whilst competing for the University of Brno in January 2020.

He won the Czech Indoor Athletics Championships title over 1500 metres in 2022, and over 800 metres in 2023. He competed for his country at the 2023 European Cross Country Championships in Brussels, Belgium. He set a new personal best in the 800 metres at the Czech Team Championships in Hodonín in September 2023, with a time of 1:47.15. He lowered it to 1:46.57 in winning the Czech indoor title in 2024.

He won the Czech Indoor Academic titles over 800 metres and 1500 metres in January 2025 in Ostrava. He made his international major championships debut at the 2025 European Athletics Indoor Championships in Apeldoorn, Netherlands, finishing fifth in his preliminary heat, although was later disqualified following collision with another athlete. He was selected for the 2025 World Athletics Indoor Championships in Nanjing, China, in March 2025, where he finished fourth in his heat in a time of 1:49.76 and did not progress to the next stage.

Kotyza won the 800 metres at the 2026 Czech Indoor Athletics Championships in Ostrava.

== Personal life ==
He attended the Faculty of Sports Studies at Masaryk University in Brno.
