= Czech Indoor Athletics Championships =

Track and field competition in the Czech Republic

- Sport: Indoor track and field
- Founded: 1993
- Country: Czech Republic

The Czech Indoor Athletics Championships (Czech: Halové mistrovství Českérepubliky v atletice) is an annual indoor track and field competition organised by the Czech Athletics Federation, which serves as the national championship for the sport in the Czech Republic. Typically held over two days in February during the Czech winter, it was added to the national calendar in 1993, the year of the dissolution of Czechoslovakia. The main outdoor Czech Athletics Championships was held for the first time in the summer that year. The Czech Indoor Combined Events Championships are usually held separately from the other track and field events.

== Events ==
The following athletics events feature as standard on the Czech Indoor Championships programme:

- Sprints: 60 m, 200 m, 400 m
- Distance track events: 800 m, 1500 m, 3000 m
- Hurdles: 60 m hurdles
- Jumps: long jump, triple jump, high jump, pole vault
- Throws: shot put
- Racewalking: 5000 m (men), 3000 m (women)
- Combined events: heptathlon (men), pentathlon (women)

A men's 5000 metres race walk and a women's 3000 metres race walk were held at the first two editions in 1993 and 1994, but was dropped from the programme thereafter. The women's pole vault was not held at the first edition.

== Editions ==
Ed.	Year	Location	Dates	Venue	Events	Athletes	Ref..
1st	1993						
2nd	1994						
3rdh	1995						
4th	1996						
5th	1997						
6th	1998	Prague	14–15 February	Atletická hala Otakara Jandery			
7th	1999	Prague	20–21 February	Atletická hala Otakara Jandery			
8th	2000	Prague	12–13 February	Atletická hala Otakara Jandery			
9th	2001	Prague	17–18 February	Atletická hala Otakara Jandery			
10th	2002	Prague	16–17 February	Atletická hala Otakara Jandery	28		
11th	2003	Bratislava, Slovakia	1–2 March	Športová hala Elán	28	261	
12th	2004	Prague	21–22 February	Atletická hala Otakara Jandery	28	294	
13th	2005	Prague	19–20 February	Atletická hala Otakara Jandery	28	282	
14th	2006	Prague	25–26 February	Atletická hala Otakara Jandery	28	305	
15th	2007	Prague	24–25 February	Atletická hala Otakara Jandery	28	311	
16th	2008	Prague	23–24 February	Atletická hala Otakara Jandery	28	305	
17th	2009	Prague	21–22 February	Atletická hala Otakara Jandery	28	293	
18th	2010	Prague	27–28 February	Atletická hala Otakara Jandery	28	287	
19th	2011	Prague	19–20 February	Atletická hala Otakara Jandery	28	309	
20th	2012	Prague	25–26 February	Atletická hala Otakara Jandery	28	304	
21st	2013	Prague	16–17 February	Atletická hala Otakara Jandery	28	333	
22nd	2014	Prague	15–16 February	Atletická hala Otakara Jandery	28	358	
23rd	2015	Prague	21–22 February	Atletická hala Otakara Jandery	28	324	
24th	2016	Ostrava	27–28 February				
25th	2017	Prague	25–26 February	Atletická hala Otakara Jandery			
26th	2018	Prague	17–18 February	Atletická hala Otakara Jandery			
27th	2019	Ostrava	16–17 February				
28th	2020	Ostrava	22–23 February				
29th	2021	Ostrava	20–21 February				
30th	2022	Ostrava	5–6 March				
31st	2023	Ostrava	18–19 February				
32nd	2024	Ostrava	17–18 February				

== Championships records ==
=== Women ===
Event	Record	Athlete/Team	Date	Place	Ref.
60 m	7.15 NR	Karolína Maňasová	17 February 2024	Ostrava	
Pole vault	4.72 m NR	Amalie Svabikova	18 February 2023	Ostrava	

== See also ==
- Czech Athletics Championships
- Czech Republic Marathon Championships
- List of Czech records in athletics
