= Vít Pavlišta =

Czech long-distance runner

Vít Pavlišta (born 22 March 1985) is a Czech long-distance runner that earned a qualifying time for the marathon at the 2016 Olympics.

Pavlišta has won national championships in mountain running, the half marathon, and the marathon. This includes the 2015 marathon title. He also finished second in the 2007 Běchovice – Prague Race and other national podium finishes.

He has a background in Nordic combined.

He is considered an amateur runner.
