= Alena Peterková =

Czech runner

Personal information
- Nationality: Czech
- Born: 13 November 1960 (age 65)

Sport
- Country: Czechoslovakia
- Sport: Long-distance running
- Event: Marathon

Alena Peterková (born 13 November 1960) is a Czech former long-distance runner. She competed for Czechoslovakia in the women's marathon at the 1992 Summer Olympics in Barcelona.
