= Marcela Joglová =

Czech long-distance runner

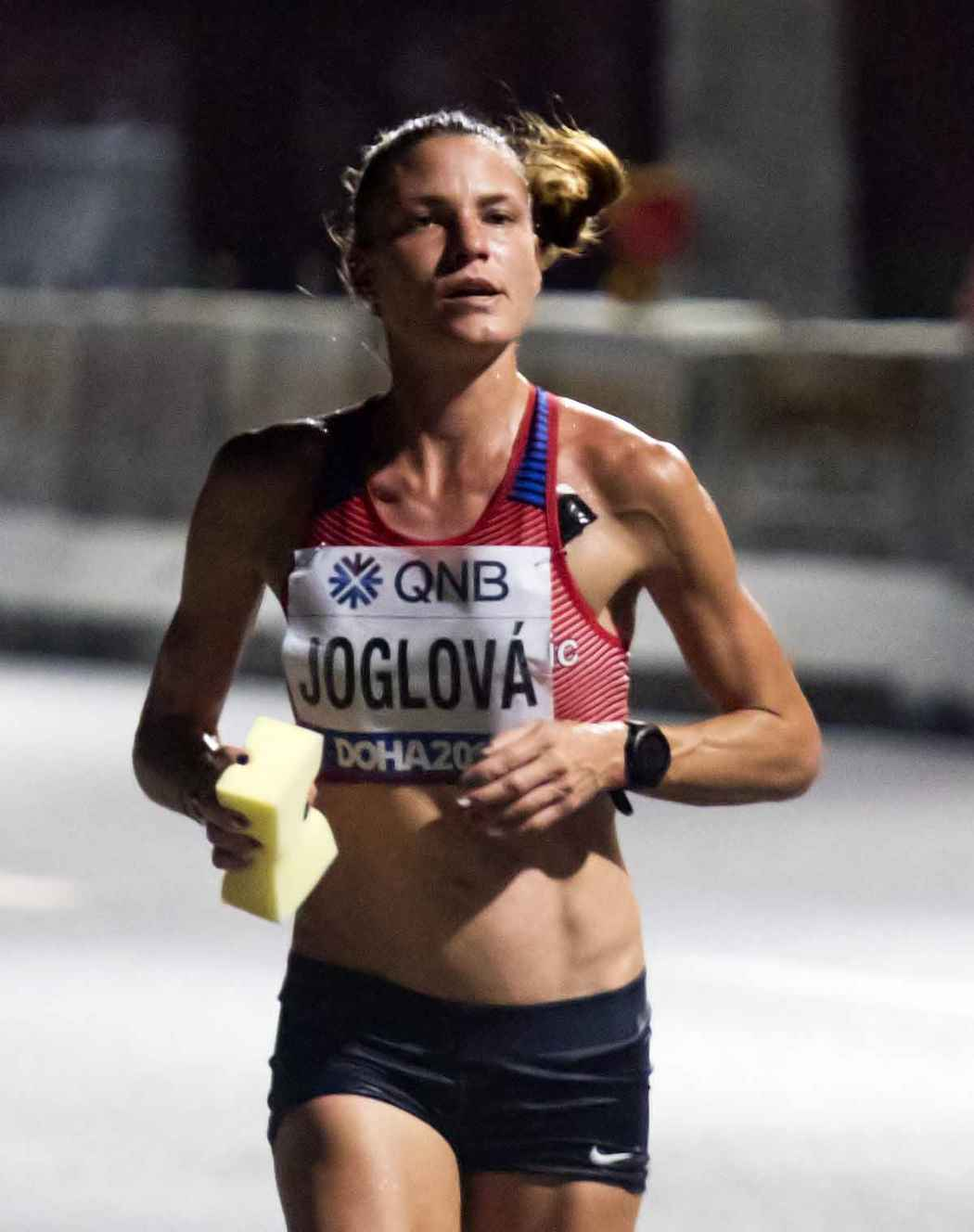

Personal information
- Nationality: Czech
- Born: 27 July 1987 (age 38) Plánice, Czechoslovakia

Sport
- Sport: Athletics
- Event: Marathon

Achievements and titles
- Personal best: Marathon: 2:28:16 (2021)

Marcela Joglová (born 27 July 1987) is a Czech former long-distance runner. She took part in the women's marathon at the 2020 Summer Olympics.

== Early life ==
Joglová was born in Plánice in the Klatovy District. She studied at the Faculty of Physical Education and Sport and worked simultaneously as a paramedic. After moving to Prague, she had various occupations including being a bartender, a nurse at a dermatology clinic, and an au pair. She also qualified as a certified personal trainer.

== Athletics career ==
Joglová competed in the 2018 Prague Marathon, finishing as the ninth woman overall, and second Czech woman behind Petra Pastorova for second place at the Czech Republic Marathon Championships.

She competed in the women's marathon event at the 2019 World Athletics Championships in Doha, Qatar. Her first time competing in the event, she finished with a time of 2:52:22 for twentieth place.

In 2020 she won the Czech national championship at half marathon distance with a time of 1:13:46. Later in 2020, she competed in the women's race at the 2020 World Athletics Half Marathon Championships held in Gdynia, Poland. In December 2020, she ran a personal best 2:31:29 at the Valencia Marathon in Spain.

In April 2021 Joglová ran a marathon within the Olympic qualifying standard, finishing the race at the Enschede Airport Twente in the Netherlands in a new personal best time of 2:28:16. Her time was also the third-fastest marathon time by a Czech woman. In August 2021 Joglová represented the Czech Republic at the 2020 Summer Olympics. In the women's marathon she was the first of three Czech athletes, finishing in 52nd place with a time of 2:39:29 in Sapporo.

At the 2022 Prague Marathon in May, Joglová finished as the seventh woman overall, and first Czech woman, to win the Czech Marathon Championship. In August of the same year, she competed in the women's marathon at the European Championships in Munich, finishing second of three Czech runners and 24th overall.

Having only taken part in one race since undergoing surgery in autumn 2022, Joglová announced her retirement from competitive running in May 2024.
