= Eliška Staňková =

Czech discus thrower

Personal information
- Born: 11 November 1984 (age 40) Kraslice, Czechoslovakia

Sport
- Sport: Athletics
- Event: Discus throw
- Club: PSK Olymp Praha (–2013); A. C. TEPO Kladno (2013–)

Eliška Staňková (born 11 November 1984) is a Czech athlete specialising in the discus throw. She represented her country at four consecutive European Championships, her best placing being 10th in 2014.

Her personal best in the event is 60.48 metres set in Kolín in 2016.

== International competitions ==
Year	Competition	Venue	Position	Event	Notes
Representing the Czech Republic
2009	Universiade	Belgrade, Serbia	18th (q)	Discus throw	46.95 m
2012	European Championships	Helsinki, Finland	13th (q)	Discus throw	55.22 m
2014	European Championships	Zurich, Switzerland	10th	Discus throw	55.88 m
2016	European Championships	Amsterdam, Netherlands	14th	Discus throw	55.90 m
2018	European Championships	Berlin, Germany	12th	Discus throw	57.04 m
2019	World Championships	Doha, Qatar	17th (q)	Discus throw	58.98 m
