= Nikoleta Jíchová =

Czech athlete (born 2000)

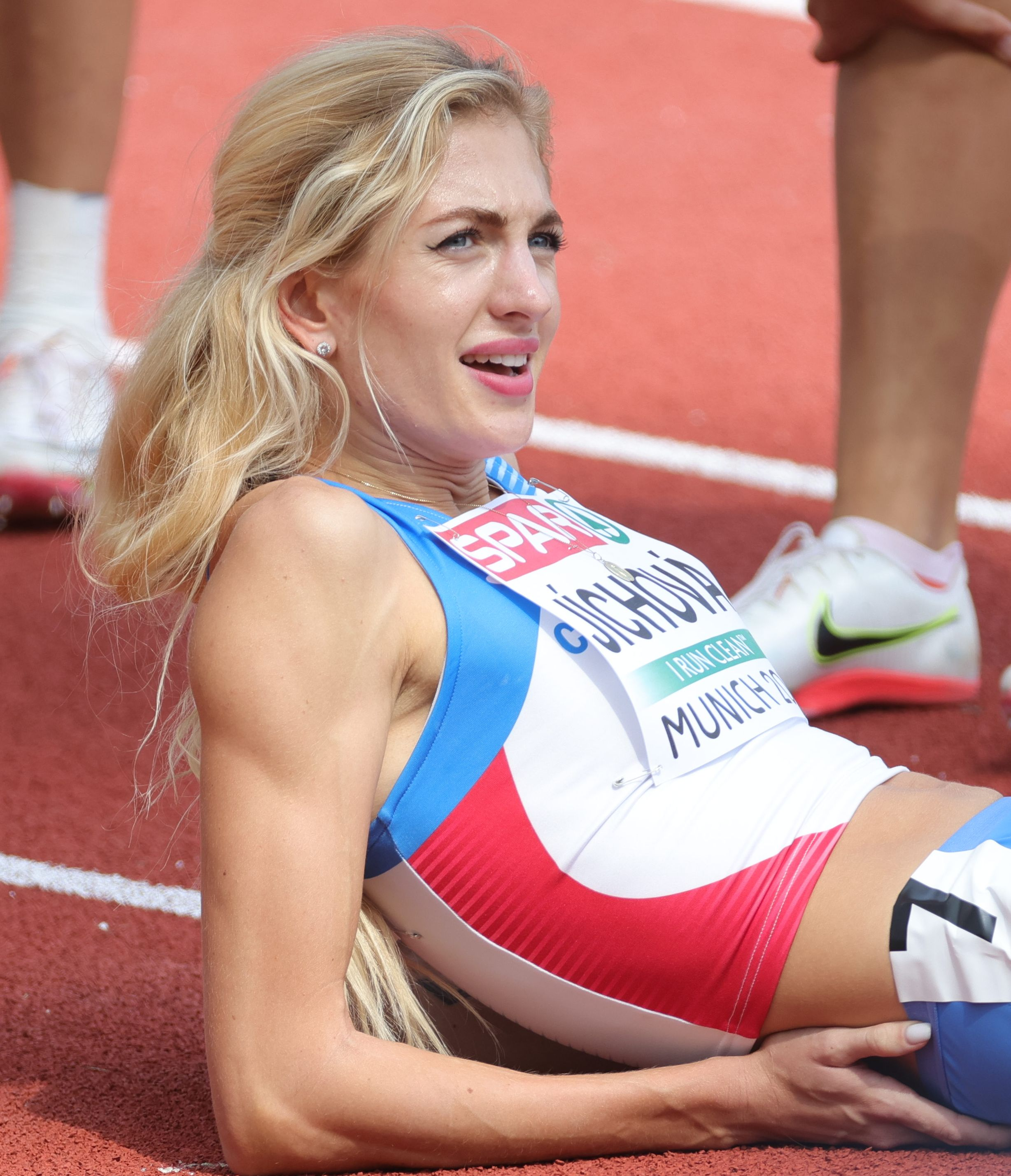
- Jíchová in Munich 2022

Personal information
- Nationality: Czech
- Born: 29 August 2000 (age 26)

Sport
- Sport: Track and field
- Event: 400m hurdles

Achievements and titles
- Personal bests: 400 m hurdles: 54.59 (Rome, 2024)
Medal record
Women's athletics
Representing Czech Republic
European Indoor Championships
Bronze medal – third place	2025 Apeldoorn	4x400 m relay
European U23 Championships
Gold medal – first place	2021 Tallinn	4×400 m relay

Nikoleta Jíchová (born 29 August 2000) is a Czech track and field athlete. She is a multiple national champion over 400m hurdles, and a European U23 Championships gold medalist.

== Career ==
Jíchová is coached by double world champion Zuzana Hejnová. She is a member of TJ Dukla Prague. She raced over 100m hurdles before switching to the longer distance of 400m hurdles in 2020.

=== 2021 ===
In Zlín in June 2021, Jíchová won the senior 400m hurdles at the 2021 Czech Athletics Championships. In 2021 she was part of the Czech team that won gold at the 2021 European Athletics U23 Championships in the Women's 4 × 400 metres relay.

=== 2022 ===
The following year Jíchová retained the Czech national title over 400m hurdles, at the Czech Championships held in June 2022 in Hodonín. Jíchová ran a time of 55.93 to qualify win her heat and to qualify for the semi-finals of the 400m at the 2022 European Championships held in Munich, Germany. In the semi-finals Jíchova set a new personal best time of 55.48s without progressing to the final.

=== 2023 ===
Selected for the 2023 World Athletics Championships in Budapest in August 2023, she qualified for the semi-finals.

=== 2024 ===
On 10 June 2024, she ran a personal best 54.59 seconds to qualify for the final at the 2024 European Athletics Championships in Rome. In the final, she finished fourth overall in a time of 54.91 seconds. She competed in the 400 metres hurdles at the 2024 Summer Olympics in Paris in August 2024.

=== 2025 ===
In February 2025, she became the Czech indoor champion over 400 metres, winning in Ostrava with a time of 52.10 seconds ahead of Tereza Petržilková. She was selected for the 2025 European Athletics Indoor Championships in Appeldoorn. In the 400 metres, she ran a personal best and qualified for the semi-final but was later disqualified for a lane infringement. Alongside Lada Vondrová, Petržilková and Lurdes Gloria Manuel, she won a bronze medal in the women's 4 x 400 metres relay at the Championships.

== Personal life ==
Jíchová has done modelling work, and featured on magazine covers in her homeland. She attributed this to an increase in her social media followers. In 2021 Jíchová announced she was in a relationship with fellow athlete Martin Růžička.
