= Tereza Hrochová =

Czech long-distance runner

Personal information
- Born: 24 February 1996 (age 30) Česká Lípa, Czech Republic

Sport
- Country: Czech Republic
- Sport: Long-distance running
- Club: Škoda Plzeň
- Coached by: Vladimír Bartůněk

Achievements and titles
- Personal bests: Marathon: 2:26:38 (Seville 2024); Half marathon: 1:11:38 (Rome 2024); 10K run: 31:05.00 (Valencia 2026)

Tereza Hrochová (born 24 February 1996) is a Czech long-distance runner. She is a two-time Olympian, having competed in the Summer Olympic Games of 2020 and 2024. She holds the Czech national record in the 10K road race.

== Career ==
In 2019, she competed in the women's half marathon at the Summer Universiade held in Naples, Italy. She finished in 13th place.

She competed in the women's half marathon at the 2020 World Athletics Half Marathon Championships held in Gdynia, Poland.

Hrochová competed in the 2020 Summer Olympics in Tokyo, finishing 58th in the women's marathon in August 2021 with a time of 2:42:45.

Hrochová competed in the women's marathon at the 2022 World Athletics Championships held in Eugene, Oregon, United States. She finished in 17th place in a time of 2 hours 30 minutes and 39 seconds.

Hrochová qualified for the women's marathon at the 2024 Olympics in February 2024, after running the third-fastest time for Czech women of 2:26:38 in Seville. This beat her previous personal best at the distance by more than two minutes. In May 2024, Hrochová won the Karlovy Vary Half Marathon with a time of 1:12:29. At the 2024 Summer Olympics, Hrochová completed the women's marathon in a time of 2:30:00, finishing in 26th place. In September 2024, she finished first at the Běchovice – Prague Race and defended the title she won in 2023, setting a Czech women's course record with a time of 33 minutes and 12 seconds.

In February 2025, Hrochová set a new Czech record in the 10K road race with a time of 32 minutes and 6 seconds in Bad Füssing, Germany. She was one of four Czech athletes, and the only woman, who took part in the inaugural European Running Championships in Belgium in April of that year. In the women's marathon in Brussels she finished ninth with a time of 2:32:15. Hrochová won the Czech national title at the 2025 Prague Marathon, finishing in a time of 2:34:04. It was her first national title in the marathon and 17th in running events overall. She was the first Czech woman to finish the 2025 Prague Grand Prix, setting a new national record at the 10K distance of 31:38.

On 11 January 2026, Hrochová broke her own 10K record, finishing in 31:05 at the 10K Valencia race in Valencia. In September 2026 she ran the Běchovice – Prague Race with a women's course record time of 32:28.
