= Lucie Koudelová =

Czech hurdler

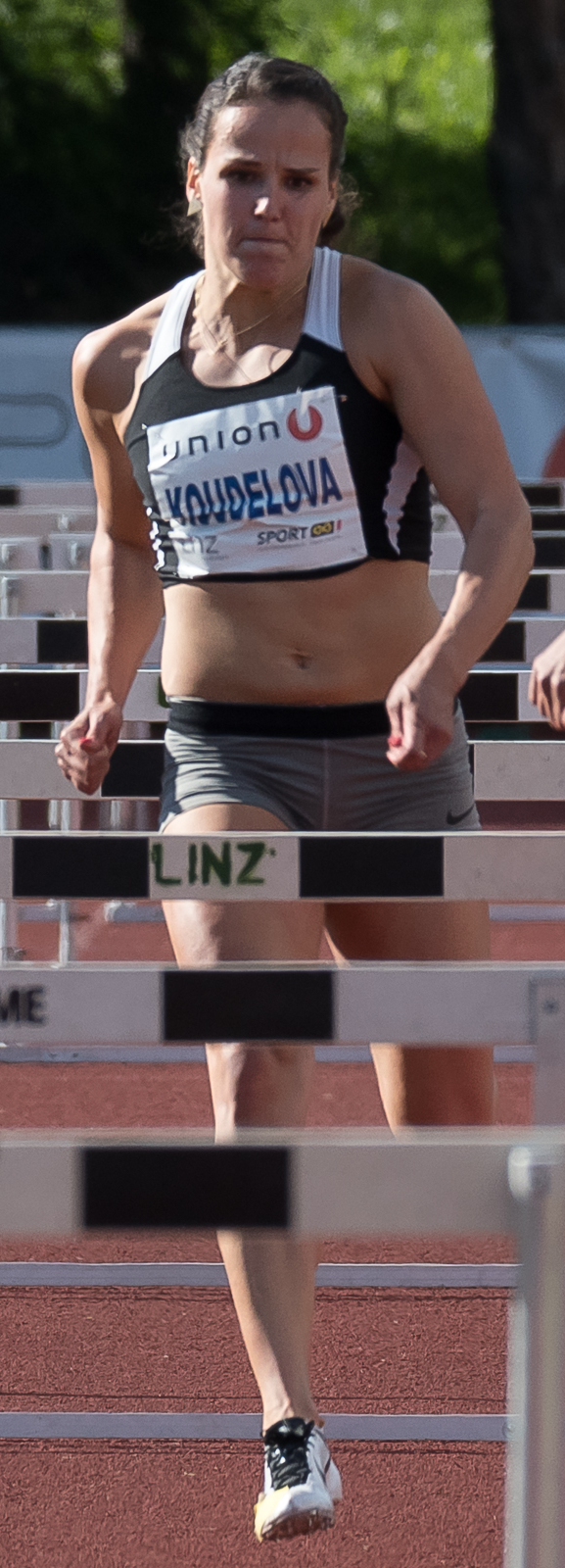

Personal information
- Born: July 6, 1994 (age 32) Uherské Hradiště, Czech Republic

Sport
- Sport: Athletics
- Event: 100 m hurdles
- Club: AK Olymp Brno
- Coached by: Petr Habásko

Lucie Koudelová (born 6 July 1994) is a Czech athlete specialising in the sprint hurdles. She represented her country at two outdoor and one indoor European Championships.

She has personal bests of 13.12 seconds in the 100 metres hurdles (+1.9 m/s, Tábor 2016) and 8.20 seconds in the 60 metres hurdles (Prague 2015).

== International competitions ==
Year	Competition	Venue	Position	Event	Notes
Representing the Czech Republic
2011	World Youth Championships	Lille, France	11th (sf)	100 m hurdles (76.2 cm)	14.07
2011	European Youth Olympic Festival	Trabzon, Turkey	11th (h)	100 m hurdles (76.2 cm)	13.96
2013	European Junior Championships	Rieti, Italy	18th (h)	100 m hurdles	13.95
2014	European Championships	Zürich, Switzerland	–	100 m hurdles	DNF
2015	European Indoor Championships	Prague, Czech Republic	22nd (h)	60 m hurdles	8.22
2015	European U23 Championships	Tallinn, Estonia	7th (sf)	100 m hurdles	13.26
2015	European U23 Championships	Tallinn, Estonia	6th	4 × 100 m relay	44.91
2016	European Championships	Amsterdam, Netherlands	20th (h)	100 m hurdles	13.41
2019	Universiade	Naples, Italy	13th (sf)	100 m hurdles	13.64
2019	Universiade	Naples, Italy	7th	4 × 100 m relay	45.83
