= Moira Stewartová =

Czech long-distance runner

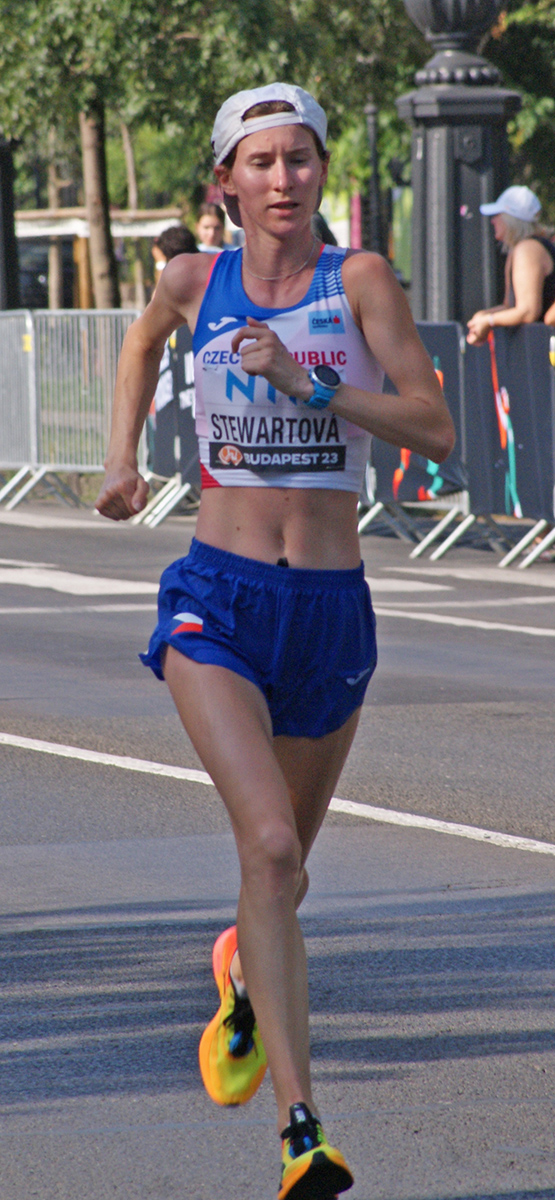

Personal information
- Born: 9 June 1995 (age 31) Prague, Czech Republic

Sport
- Country: Czech Republic
- Sport: Long-distance running

Moira Stewartová (born 9 June 1995) is a Czech long-distance runner. She is the Czech national record holder in the women's marathon, having run 2:23:44 in Valencia in 2024.

== Career ==
Stewartová won the women's race at the Cross della Vallagarina held in Italy both in 2019 and in 2020.

In 2019, she competed in the senior women's race at the 2019 IAAF World Cross Country Championships. She finished in 70th place. In the same year, she also competed in the women's event at the 2019 European 10,000m Cup held in London, United Kingdom, where she set the second-fastest Czech time at that distance: 32:57.51. In 2020, she competed in the women's half marathon at the 2020 World Athletics Half Marathon Championships held in Gdynia, Poland, finishing in 34th with a time of 1:11:08.

Stewartová is the Czech national record holder of the women's marathon. After completing the 2023 Valencia Marathon in Spain with a record time of 2:25:36, she improved her time at the same race in 2024 to 2:23:44 as she finished ninth. In spite of her new national record, she was still 14 seconds short of the qualification time for the following 2025 World Athletics Championships in Tokyo, Japan.

Stewartová made her Olympic debut in 2024, placing 66th in the women's marathon after finishing in a time of 2:38:07 on the Paris course.

In April 2025, Stewartová missed the inaugural European Running Championships in Belgium due to a knee injury interfering with her training regime.

== Personal life ==
Stewartová was born on 9 June 1995 in Prague. Her parents are also runners, Czech mother Miriam and Scottish father Eddie Stewart met during a competition in Bolzano, Italy.
