= Diana Mezuliáníková =

Czech middle-distance runner

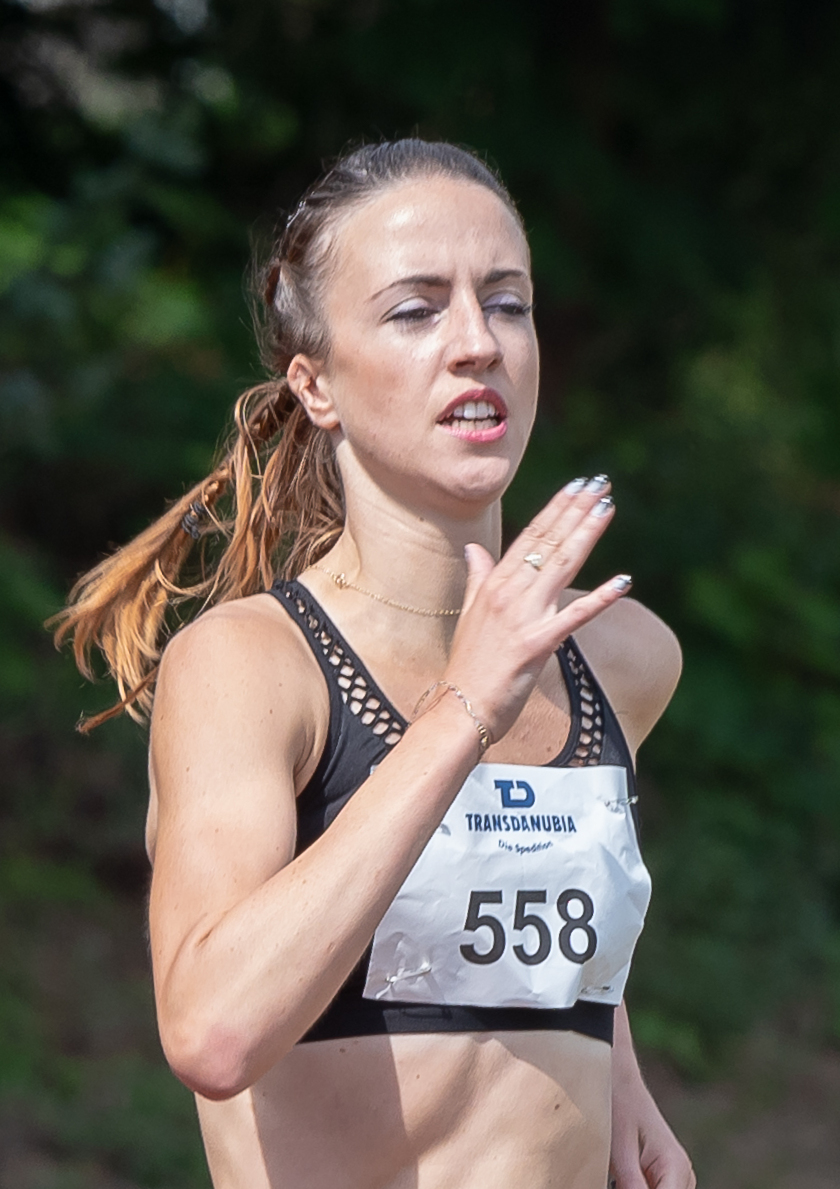
- Diana Mezuliáníková in 2018

Personal information
- Born: 10 April 1992 (age 34) Bruntál, Czechoslovakia

Sport
- Sport: Athletics
- Event: 1500 metres
- Club: PSK Olymp Praha

Diana Mezuliáníková (born 10 April 1992 in Bruntál) is a Czech middle-distance runner specialising in the 1500 metres. She finished 7th at the 2015 European Indoor Championships and 10th at the 2018 European Championships.

== International competitions ==
Year	Competition	Venue	Position	Event	Notes
Representing the Czech Republic
2011	European Junior Championships	Tallinn, Estonia	7th	800 m	2:09.11
2013	European U23 Championships	Tampere, Finland	13th (h)	1500 m	4:18.24
2014	European Championships	Zurich, Switzerland	18th (h)	1500 m	4:15.40
2015	European Indoor Championships	Prague, Czech Republic	7th	1500 m	4:16.93
2015	Universiade	Gwangju, South Korea	6th	1500 m	4:23.14
2018	European Championships	Berlin, Germany	10th	1500 m	4:07.82
2019	European Indoor Championships	Glasgow, United Kingdom	17th (h)	1500 m	4:11.92
2019	World Championships	Doha, Qatar	30th (h)	800 m	2:03.48
2021	European Indoor Championships	Toruń, Poland	8th (h)	1500 m	4:11.48
2021	Olympic Games	Tokyo, Japan	17th (sf)	1500 m	4:03.70
2022	World Championships	Eugene, United States	19th (sf)	1500 m	4:07.62
2022	European Championships	Munich, Germany	15th (h)	1500 m	4:07.37
2025	European Indoor Championships	Apeldoorn, Netherlands	16th (h)	1500 m	4:18.29

== Personal bests ==
Outdoor

- 600 metres – 1:30.43 (Kolin 2014) NR
- 800 metres – 2:01.36 (Szczecin 2018)
- 1000 metres – 2:44.72 (Andorf 2016)
- 1500 metres – 4:03.70 (Tokyo 2021)
- 3000 metres – 9:32.78 (Kladno 2015)

Indoor

- 800 metres – 2:02.50 (Ostrava 2019)
- 1000 metres – 2:43.91 (Prague 2017)
- 1500 metres – 4:11.53 (Ostrava 2017)
- 3000 metres – 9:12.63 (Mondeville 2017)
