= Belgian men's 4 × 400 metres relay team =

National athletics relay team

Olympic Games
- Appearances: 10
- Medals: 0

World Championships
- Appearances: 7
- Medals: 2
Medal record
Athletics
Event	1st	2nd	3rd
World Championships	0	0	2
World Indoor Championships	2	1	1
World Relays	0	0	3
European Championships	4	1	1
European Indoor Championships	3	1	1
Total	9	3	8

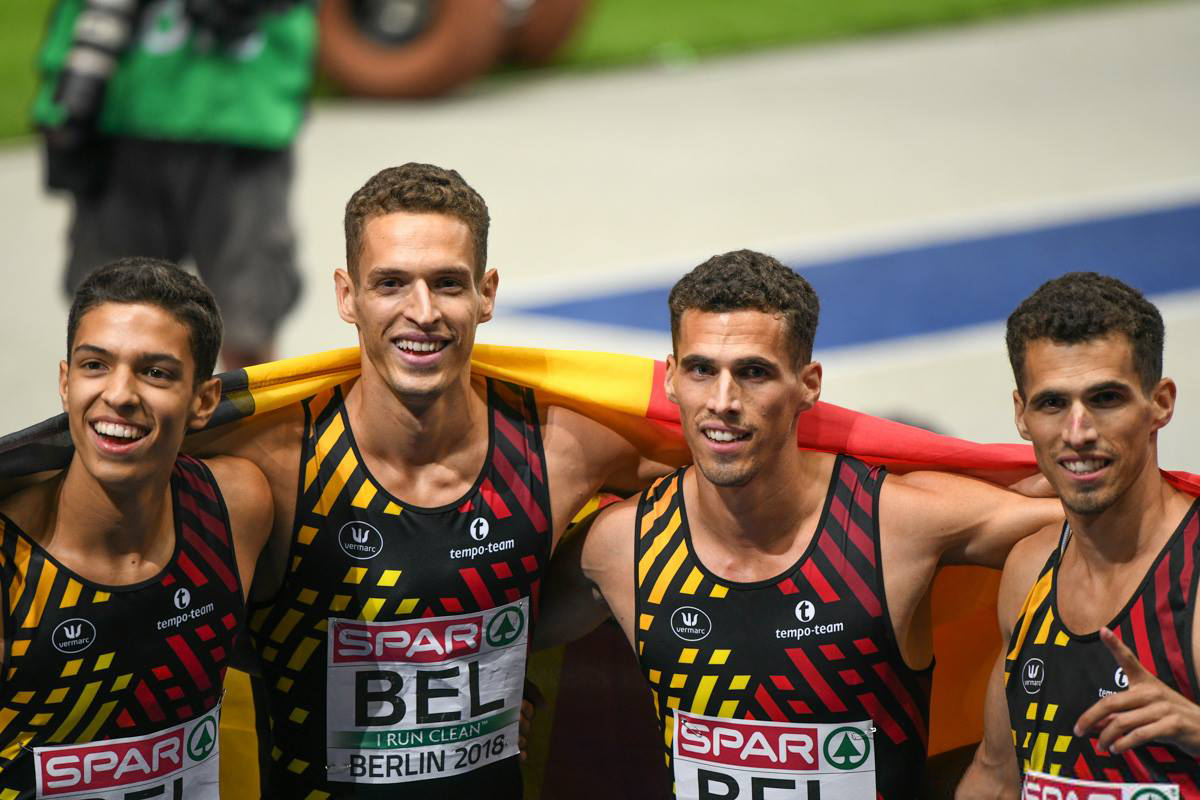
From left Jonathan Sacoor, Dylan Borlée and the twins Kevin and Jonathan Borlée

The Belgian men's 4 × 400 metres relay team, nicknamed the Belgian Tornados from July 2014 onwards, is the relay team of the Belgian national athletics team that has given the highest number of medals in international competitions, mainly thanks to the support of the Borlée family.

== History ==
The Belgian men's 4 × 400 meters relay team has won 17 medals at international athletics competitions, six at the World Championships (two gold) and eleven (seven gold) at the European Championships. Of these medals, eight were won in outdoor competitions (four gold) and nine in indoor competitions (five gold).

At the Olympic Games the team's best result was 4th place four times.

== Borlée family ==
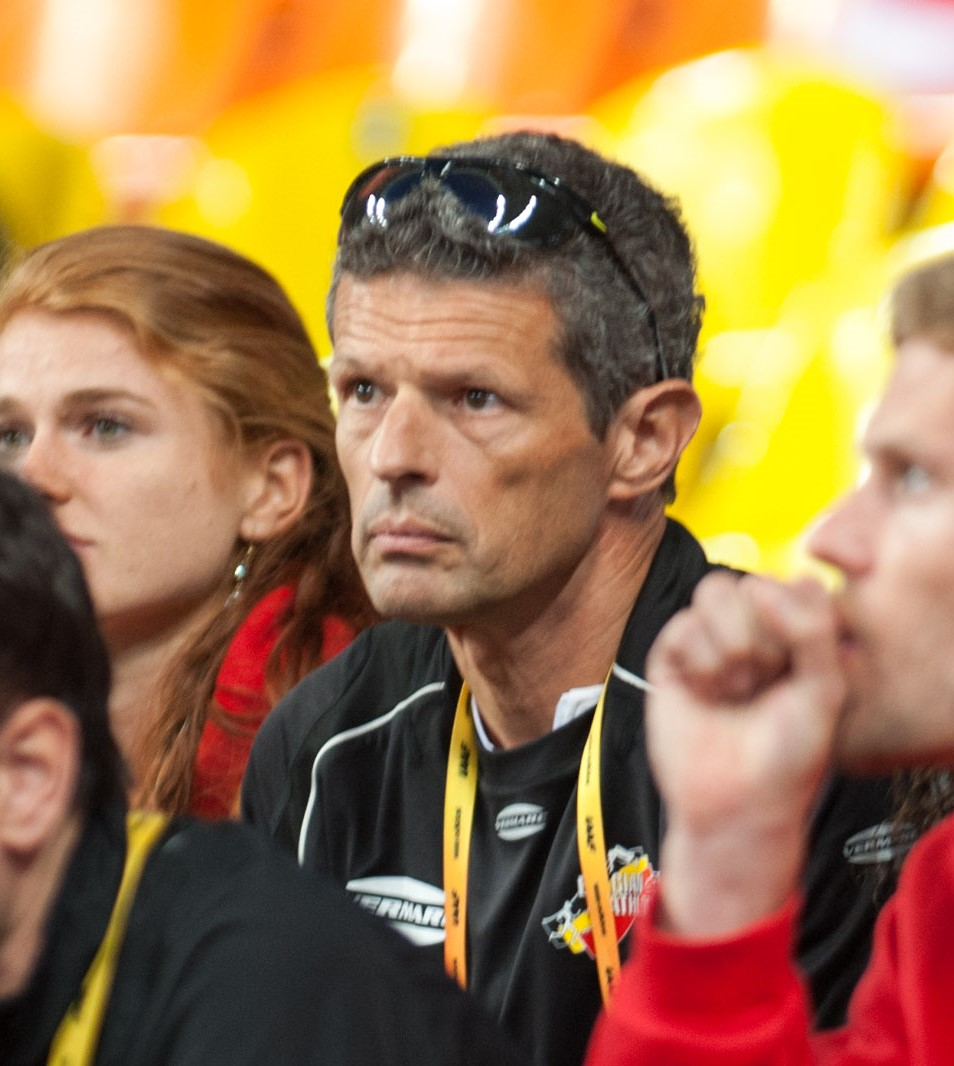
Jacques Borlée.

The progenitor of the Borlee family is Jacques (born 1957), bronze medalist at the 1983 European Indoor Championships in Budapest on 200 m, while his first wife Edith Demaertelaere (born 1964) was a good sprinter with a personal best of 23.89. Six of his seven children are athletes (the first five born from the first marriage with Edith, the last two born from a second marriage, but now only Rayane (born 1999) is an athlete).

The eldest daughter Olivia (born 1986) won the gold medal at the 2008 Summer Olympics and the world bronze at the 2007 Osaka World Championships with the 4 × 100 m relay and the other daughter Alizia (born 1991) was also a decent sprinter. The four sons are all 400 m specialists, the twins Jonathan and Kevin (born 1988), both Olympic finalists in London 2012, Dylan (born 1992) and the youngest Rayane. In addition, Jacques' older brother Jean-Pierre (born 1947) was also a sprinter.

In 2015 the Belgian men's 4 × 400 meters relay team won the Belgian National Sports Merit Award (Trophée national du Mérite sportif) award assigned to the components Dylan Borlée, Jonathan Borlée, Kevin Borlée, Antoine Gillet et Julien Watrin.

== Results ==
=== Olympic Games ===
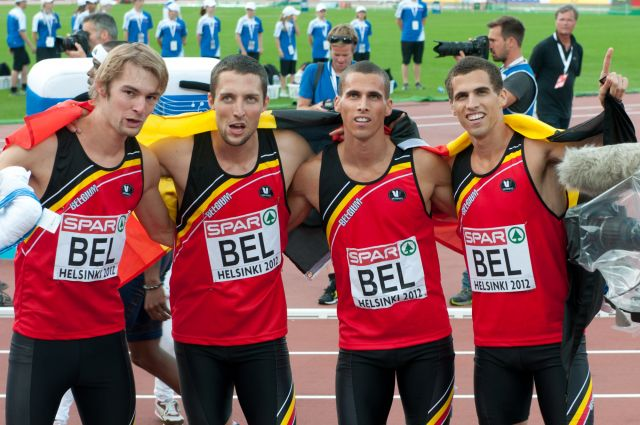
The European champions of Helsinki 2012, from left: Jente Bouckaert, Antoine Gillet, Kevin and Jonathan Borlée.

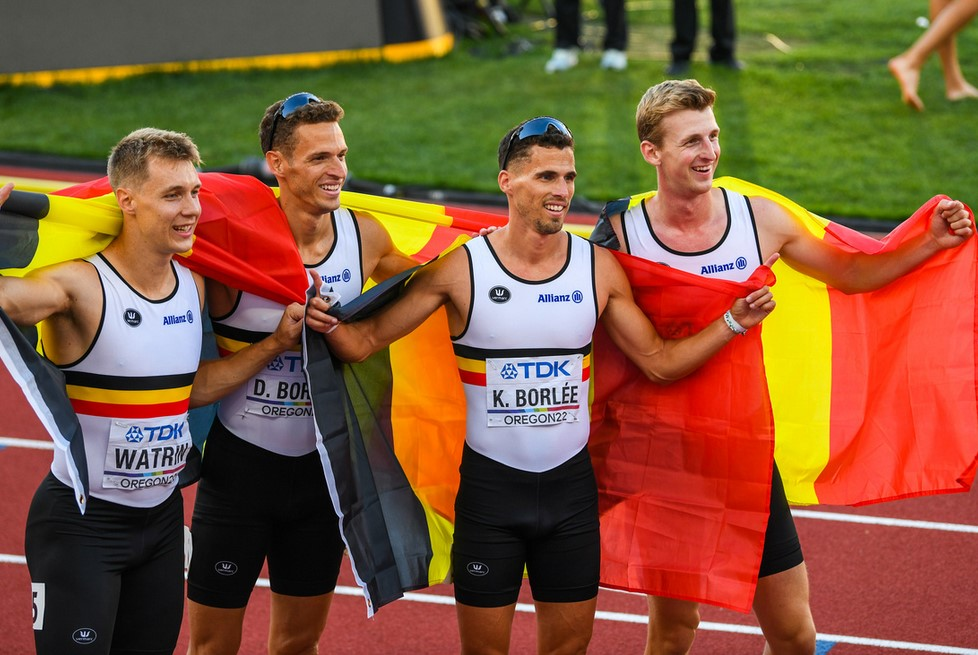
The team, bronze medal at Oregon 22 World Championships.

Year	Competition	Venue	Rank	Time	Notes
Olympic Games
1920	Olympic Games	(Belgium) Antwerp	6th	3:24.9	
1928	Olympic Games	(Netherlands) Amsterdam	Heat	DNF	
1952	Olympic Games	(Finland) Helsinki	Heat	3:15.8	
1960	Olympic Games	(Italy) Rome	Heat	3:15.26	
1980	Olympic Games	(Soviet Union) Moscow	Heat	DNF	
2008	Olympic Games	(China) Beijing	4th	2:59.37	NR
2012	Olympic Games	(United Kingdom) London	5th	3:01.83	(Note: In heats run a better crono (3:01.70))
2016	Olympic Games	(Brazil) Rio de Janeiro	4th	2:58.52	
2020	Olympic Games	(Japan) Tokyo	4th	2:57.88	NR
2024	Olympic Games	(France) Paris	4th	2:57.75	NR

=== Others competitions ===
Outdoor

Year	Competition	Venue	Rank	Team	Time	Notes
2010	European Championships	(Spain) Barcelona	3rd	Arnaud Destatte, Kevin Borlée, Cédric Van Branteghem, Jonathan Borlée, Antoine Gillet, Nils Duerinck	3:02.60	
2012	European Championships	(Finland) Helsinki	1st	Antoine Gillet, Jonathan Borlée, Jente Bouckaert, Kevin Borlée, Nils Duerinck	3:01.09	EL
2015	World Relays	(The Bahamas) Nassau	3rd	Dylan Borlée, Julien Watrin, Jonathan Borlée, Kevin Borlée	2:59.33	NR
2016	European Championships	(Netherlands) Amsterdam	1st	Julien Watrin, Jonathan Borlée, Dylan Borlée, Kevin Borlée, Robin Vanderbemden	3:01.10	EL
2018	European Championships	(Germany) Berlin	1st	Jonathan Sacoor, Dylan Borlée, Kevin Borlée, Jonathan Borlée	2:59.47	EL
2019	World Relays	(Japan) Yokohama	3rd	Dylan Borlée, Robin Vanderbemden, Jonathan Borlée, Jonathan Sacoor, Julien Watrin	3:02.70	SB
2019	World Championships	(Qatar) Doha	3rd	Jonathan Sacoor, Robin Vanderbemden, Dylan Borlée, Kevin Borlée, Julien Watrin	2:58.78	SB
2022	World Championships	(United States) Eugene	3rd	Dylan Borlée, Julien Watrin, Alexander Doom, Kevin Borlée, Jonathan Sacoor	2:58.72	SB
2022	European Championships	(Germany) Munich	2nd	Alexander Doom, Julien Watrin, Kevin Borlée, Dylan Borlée	2:59.49	
2024	World Relays	(The Bahamas) Nassau	3rd	Dylan Borlée, Robin Vanderbemden, Alexander Doom, Jonathan Sacoor	3:01.16	SB
2024	European Championships	(Italy) Rome	1st	Jonathan Sacoor, Robin Vanderbemden, Dylan Borlée, Alexander Doom, Florent Mabille, Christian Iguacel	2:59.84	EL
2025	World Relays	(China) Guangdong	2nd	Jonathan Sacoor, Robin Vanderbemden, Daniel Segers, Alexander Doom	2:58.19	SB

Indoor

Year	Competition	Venue	Rank	Team	Time	Notes
2010	World Championships	Qatar	2nd	Cédric Van Branteghem, Kevin Borlée, Antoine Gillet, Jonathan Borlée, Nils Duerinck	3:06.94	NR
2011	European Championships	(France) Paris	3rd	Jonathan Borlée, Antoine Gillet, Nils Duerinck, Kevin Borlée	3:06.57	NR
2015	European Championships	(Czech Republic) Prague	1st	Julien Watrin, Dylan Borlée, Jonathan Borlée, Kevin Borlée	3:02.87	WL NR
2017	European Championships	(Serbia) Belgrade	2nd	Robin Vanderbemden, Julien Watrin, Kevin Borlée, Dylan Borlée	3:07.80	
2018	World Championships	(United Kingdom) Birmingham	3rd	Dylan Borlée, Jonathan Borlée, Jonathan Sacoor, Kevin Borlée	3:02.51	NR
2019	European Championships	(United Kingdom) Glasgow	1st	Julien Watrin, Dylan Borlée, Jonathan Borlée, Kevin Borlée	3:06.27	
2022	World Championships	(Serbia) Belgrade	1st	Julien Watrin, Alexander Doom, Jonathan Sacoor, Kevin Borlée, Dylan Borlée	3:06.27	SB
2023	European Championships	(Turkey) Istanbul	1st	Dylan Borlée, Alexander Doom, Kevin Borlée, Julien Watrin	3:05.83	EL
2024	World Championships	(United Kingdom) Glasgow	1st	Jonathan Sacoor, Christian Iguacel, Dylan Borlée, Alexander Doom, Tibo De Smet	3:02.54	WL
2025	European Championships	(Netherlands) Apeldoorn	3rd	Julien Watrin, Christian Iguacel, Florent Mabille, Jonathan Sacoor	3:05.18	SB
2026	World Championships	(Poland) Toruń	2nd	Jonathan Sacoor, Christian Iguacel, Julien Watrin, Robin Vanderbemden	3:03.29	SB

== See also ==
- Belgium at the World Athletics Relays
- Royal Belgian Athletics League
- Borlée family
- Italian national track relay team
