= Borlée =

Borlée is a surname. Notable people with the surname include:

- Jean-Pierre Borlée (born 1947), former Belgian sprinter and older brother of Jacques
- Jacques Borlée (born 1957), former Belgian sprinter, coach and father of the six athletes in this list
- Jonathan Borlée (born 1988), Belgian sprinter and twin of Jonathan Borlée
- Kevin Borlée (born 1988), Belgian sprinter and twin of Kevin Borlée
- Olivia Borlée (born 1986), Belgian sprinter
- Alizia Borlée (born 1991), Belgian sprinter
- Dylan Borlée (born 1992), Belgian sprinter
- Rayane Borlée (born 1999), Belgian sprinter
