= Belgium at the World Athletics Relays =

- WA code: BEL
- National federation: Royal Belgian Athletics League
- Website: www.belgian-athletics.be
- Medals Ranked 3rd: Gold 0 Silver 0 Bronze 3 Total 3

World Athletics Relays appearances (overview)
- 2014; 2015; 2017; 2019; 2021; 2024

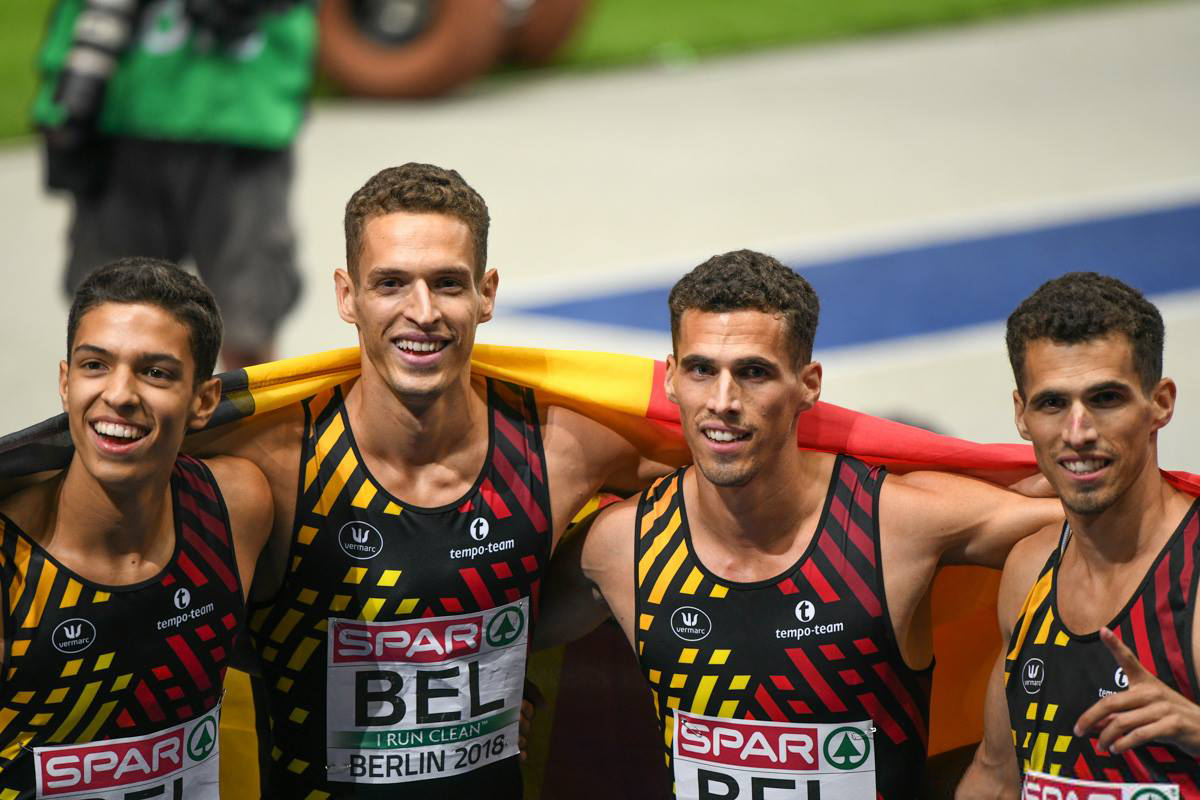
The Belgian 4 × 400 m.

Belgium has competed at the World Athletics Relays since first edition held in 2014, Belgiumns athletes have won a total of 3 bronze medals.

== Medals ==
Edition	1st place, gold medalist(s)	2nd place, silver medalist(s)	3rd place, bronze medalist(s)	Event	Team
(The Bahamas) 2014 Nassau	0	0	0		
(The Bahamas) 2015 Nassau	0	0	1	Men's 4 × 400 m relay	Dylan Borlée; Julien Watrin; Jonathan Borlée; Kevin Borlée
(The Bahamas) 2017 Nassau	0	0	0		
(Japan) 2019 Yokohama	0	0	1	Men's 4 × 400 m relay	Dylan Borlée; Robin Vanderbemden; Jonathan Borlée; Jonathan Sacoor; Julien Watrin
(Poland) 2021 Silesia	0	0	0		
(The Bahamas) 2024 Bahamas	0	0	1	Men's 4 × 400 m relay	Dylan Borlée; Robin Vanderbemden; Alexander Doom; Jonathan Sacoor
	0	0	3		

== See also ==
- Belgian men's 4 × 400 metres relay team
- Royal Belgian Athletics League
