= Borlée family =

Belgian sporting family

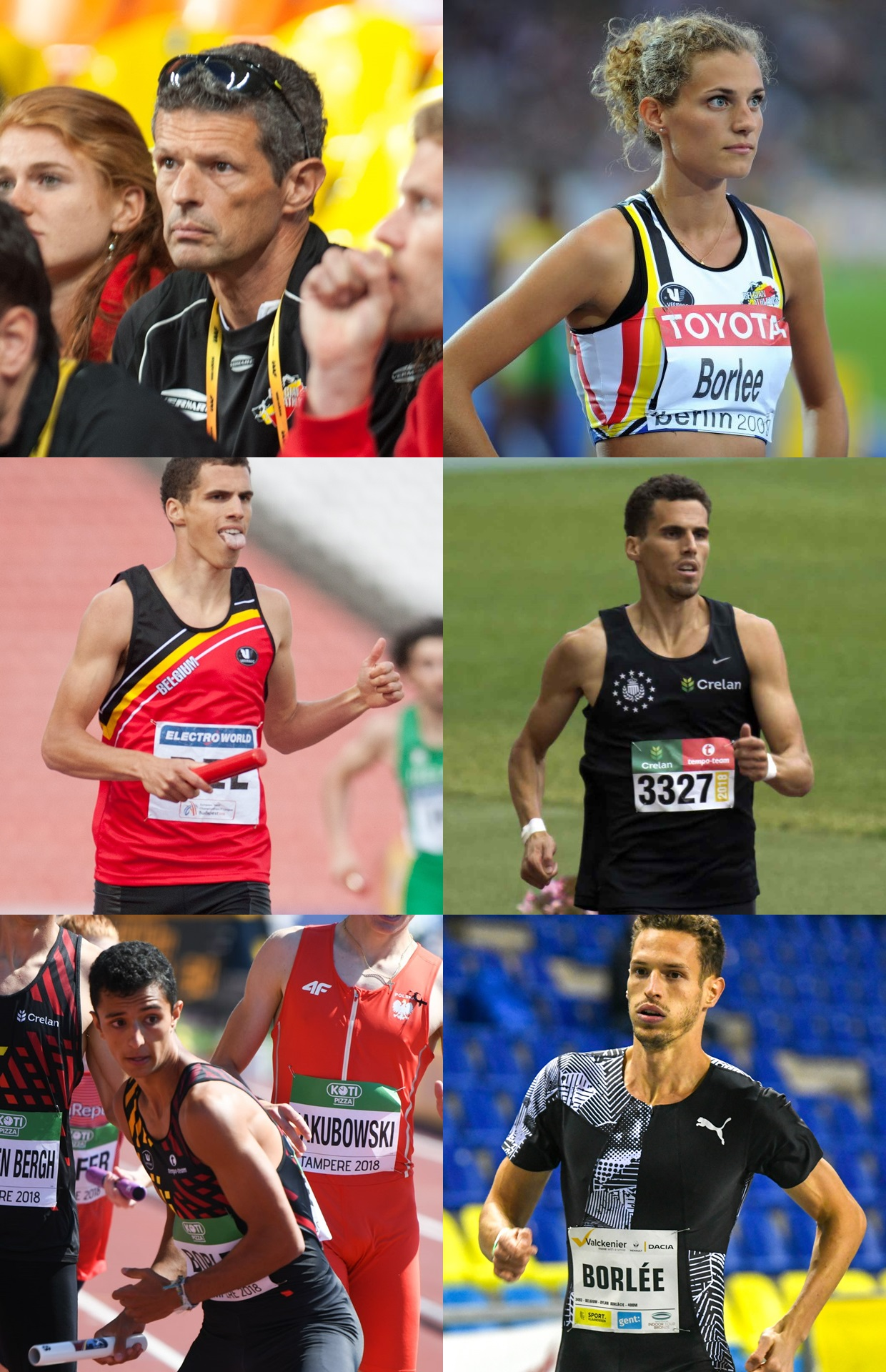
From the top left Jacques, Olivia, Jonathan, Kevin, Rayane and Dylan.

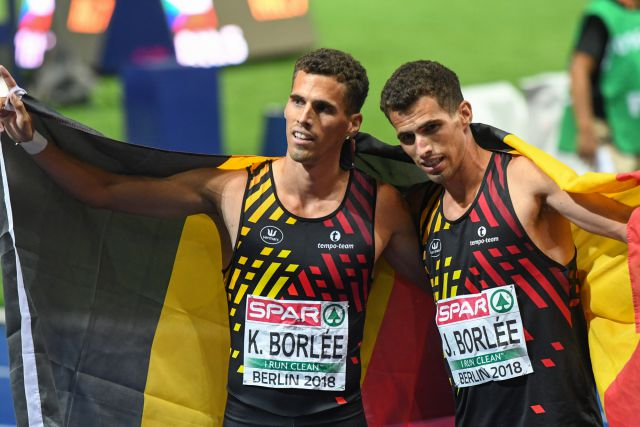
The twins Jonathan and Kevin after their individual double medal in the 400 m at the 2018 European Championships.

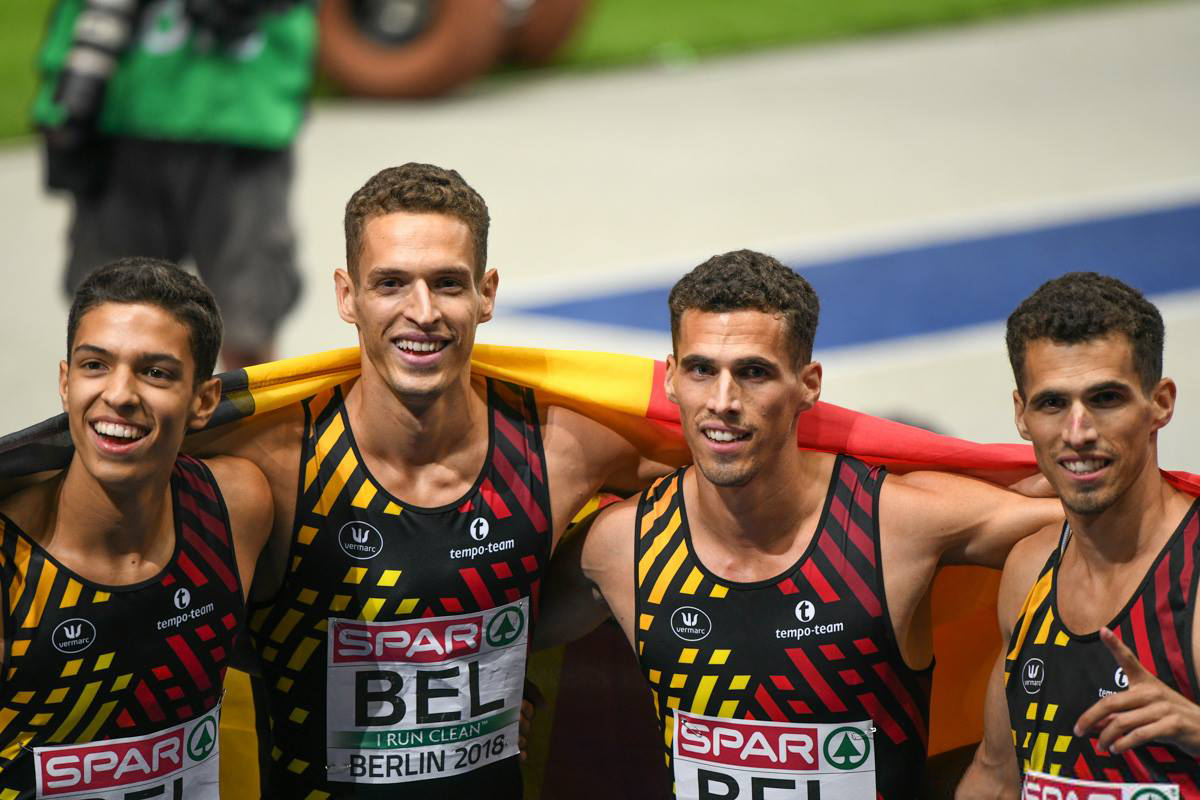
Three of the Borlée brothers, second from left Dylan Borlée, then the twins Kevin and Jonathan Borlée.

The Borlée family is a sporting family consisting of Jacques Borlée and six of his seven children.

== The family ==
The patriarch of the Borlée family is Jacques Borlée (born 1957), bronze medalist at the 1983 European Indoor Championships in Budapest in the 200 m, while his first wife, Edith Demaertelaere (born 1964), was a good sprinter with a personal best of 23.89. Six of his seven children are athletes (the first five born from the first marriage with Edith, the last two born from a second marriage).

The eldest daughter Olivia (born 1986) won the silver medal at the Olympics, which was upgraded to gold in 2016 due to the Russian team's disqualification due to doping, and the bronze at the 2007 Osaka World Championships with the 4 × 100 m relay, and the other daughter, Alizia (born 1991), was also a decent sprinter. The four sons are all 400 m specialists: the twins Jonathan and Kevin (born 1988), both Olympic finalists in London 2012, Dylan (born 1992) and the youngest Rayane. In addition, Jacques' older brother Jean-Pierre (born 1947) was also a sprinter.

In 2015 the Belgian men's 4 × 400 metres relay team won the Belgian National Sports Merit Award (Trophée national du Mérite sportif) award assigned to the components Dylan Borlée, Jonathan Borlée, Kevin Borlée, Antoine Gillet et Julien Watrin.

In an interview of 21 August 2013 released to the major Italian sports newspaper, La Gazzetta dello Sport, Jacques Borlée stated that he was inspired in his training methods by Sandro Calvesi, in turn the progenitor of one of the greatest families of Italian athletics, the Ottoz family. Calvesi was in fact the husband of the Berlin 1936 Olympian Gabre Gabric, father-in-law of the Olympic bronze medalist in the 110 metres hurdles in Mexico City 1968, Eddy Ottoz and father of Lyana Calvesi, current president of the Atletica Calvesi club and coach of the sprinter Eleonora Marchiando.

At a press conference in June 2022, Jacques Borlée announced his retirement from coaching after the 2024 Summer Olympics.

== Results ==
The Borlées have won medals in all five main competitions, namely: the Olympic Games (the gold medal by Olivia Borlée in 4×100 metres relay at Beijing 2008), the World Championships, both outdoor and indoor, and the European Championships, both outdoor and indoor.

And again at the World Relays, in the European Team Championships (First League), in the Continental Cup, at the Francophone Games. And finally, at the youth level, the silver medal in the 400 m at the European U23 Championships by Dylan Borlée.

Athlete	Individual			Team			Total		
Athlete	1st place, gold medalist(s)	2nd place, silver medalist(s)	3rd place, bronze medalist(s)	1st place, gold medalist(s)	2nd place, silver medalist(s)	3rd place, bronze medalist(s)	1st place, gold medalist(s)	2nd place, silver medalist(s)	3rd place, bronze medalist(s)
Kevin	1	1	1	8	3	6	9	4	7
Jonathan	0	0	1	9	1	7	9	1	6
Dylan	0	1	0	5	2	6	5	3	6
Olivia	1	0	0	1	0	1	2	0	1
Jacques	0	1	0	0	0	0	0	1	0

== Individual medals ==
Year	Competition	Venue	Rank	Event	Time	Notes
Jacques (born 1957)
1983	European Indoor Championships	(Hungary) Budapest	2nd	200 m	21.13	(Note: He ran a better time (21.10) in semi-final.)
Olivia (born 1986)
2009	European Team Championships (First League)	(Norway) Bergen	1st	200 m	23.82	
Kevin (born 1988)
2010	European Championships	(Spain) Barcelona	1st	400 m	45.08	SB
2011	World Championships	(South Korea) Daegu	3rd	400 m	44.90	(Note: He ran a better time (44.77) in the semi-final.)
2018	European Championships	(Germany) Berlin	2nd	400 m	45.13	(Note: He ran a better time (45.07) in the semi-final.)
Jonathan (born 1988)
2018	European Championships	(Germany) Berlin	3rd	400 m	45.19	(Note: He ran a better time (44.87) in the semi-final.)
Dylan (born 1992)
2015	European Indoor Championships	(Czech Republic) Prague	2nd	400 m	46.25	PB

== See also ==
- Borlée
- Belgian men's 4 × 400 metres relay team
