= Athletics at the 1979 Summer Universiade – Men's shot put =

The men's shot put event at the 1979 Summer Universiade was held at the Estadio Olimpico Universitario in Mexico City on 8 September 1979.

== Results ==
Rank	Athlete	Nationality	Result	Notes
1st place, gold medalist(s)	Udo Beyer	East Germany	20.49	
2nd place, silver medalist(s)	Reijo Ståhlberg	Finland	19.96	
3rd place, bronze medalist(s)	Nikola Khristov	Bulgaria	19.60	
4	Vladimir Kiselyov	Soviet Union	19.26	
5	Óskar Jakobsson	Iceland	19.25	
6	Valcho Stoev	Bulgaria	18.83	
7	Luigi De Santis	Italy	18.58	
8	Gennadiy Mikhaylov	Soviet Union	18.56	
9	Ian Pyka	United States	18.47	
10	Luc Viudès	France	18.20	
11	Claus-Dieter Föhrenbach	West Germany	18.16	
12	Steve Summers	United States	17.42	
13	Olli Kanervisto	Finland	17.24	
14	Mohamed Al-Zinkawi	Kuwait	16.89	
15	Aracelio Carrillo	Mexico	13.93	
	Mpheni Ndolmo	Swaziland	NM	
