= 1983 European Athletics Indoor Championships – Men's shot put =

The men's shot put event at the 1983 European Athletics Indoor Championships was held on 5 March.

== Results ==
| Rank | Name | Nationality | #1 | #2 | #3 | #4 | #5 | #6 | Result | Notes |
|---|---|---|---|---|---|---|---|---|---|---|
| 1st place, gold medalist(s) | Jānis Bojārs | Soviet Union | 19.96 | 20.56 | x | x | 20.27 | 20.19 | 20.56 | |
| 2nd place, silver medalist(s) | Aleksandr Baryshnikov | Soviet Union | 19.62 | 20.44 | x | x | 19.89 | x | 20.44 | |
| 3rd place, bronze medalist(s) | Ivan Ivančić | Yugoslavia | 19.98 | 19.58 | 19.65 | 20.08 | 20.26 | 20.07 | 20.26 | |
| 4 | Josef Kubeš | Czechoslovakia | 19.17 | 19.53 | 19.37 | 19.26 | 19.18 | 19.50 | 19.53 | |
| 5 | Vladimir Milić | Yugoslavia | 19.21 | 19.16 | 19.02 | 19.04 | 18.98 | ? | 19.21 | |
| 6 | Erwin Weitzl | Austria | 17.14 | 18.30 | 18.69 | 18.38 | x | x | 18.69 | |
| 7 | Olli Kanervisto | Finland | 17.92 | 18.53 | x | x | x | x | 18.53 | |
| 8 | Remigius Machura | Czechoslovakia | 18.01 | 18.21 | x | 18.47 | x | x | 18.47 | |
| 9 | Georgi Todorov | Bulgaria | 18.14 | 18.19 | x | | | | 18.19 | |
