= Athletics at the 1981 Summer Universiade – Men's shot put =

The men's shot put event at the 1981 Summer Universiade was held at the Stadionul Naţional in Bucharest on 21 July 1981.

== Medalists ==
| Gold | Silver | Bronze |
|---|---|---|
| Mike Carter; United States | Detlef Mortag; East Germany | Dalibor Vašíček; Czechoslovakia |

== Results ==
=== Qualification ===
| Rank | Athlete | Nationality | Result | Notes |
|---|---|---|---|---|
| 1 | Mike Carter | United States | 19.98 | |
| 2 | Zlatan Saračević | Yugoslavia | 19.93 | |
| 3 | Detlef Mortag | East Germany | 18.76 | |
| 3 | Dalibor Vašíček | Czechoslovakia | 18.76 | |
| 5 | Armin Lemme | East Germany | 18.61 | |
| 6 | Gennadiy Mikhailov | Soviet Union | 18.56 | |
| 7 | Luigi De Santis | Italy | 18.50 | |
| 8 | Luigi Sintoni | Italy | 18.46 | |
| 9 | Michael Lehmann | United States | 18.22 | |
| 10 | Josef Kubeš | Czechoslovakia | 18.19 | |
| 11 | Udo Gelhausen | West Germany | 17.78 | |
| 12 | Olli Kanervisto | Finland | 17.21 | |
| 13 | Radai Mendoza | Puerto Rico | 16.19 | |
| 14 | Gheorghe Craciunescu | Romania | 16.12 | |
| 15 | Amir Hamza | Pakistan | 13.76 | |
| 16 | Tony Musa | Lebanon | 12.74 | |
| 17 | Álvaro Alzamora | Peru | 12.28 | |
| 18 | Joseph Salamé | Lebanon | 12.19 | |

=== Final ===
| Rank | Athlete | Nationality | Result | Notes |
|---|---|---|---|---|
| 1st place, gold medalist(s) | Mike Carter | United States | 20.19 | |
| 2nd place, silver medalist(s) | Detlef Mortag | East Germany | 19.35 | |
| 3rd place, bronze medalist(s) | Dalibor Vašíček | Czechoslovakia | 19.20 | |
| 4 | Gennadiy Mikhailov | Soviet Union | 19.13 | |
| 5 | Michael Lehmann | United States | 18.85 | |
| 6 | Luigi Sintoni | Italy | 18.54 | |
| 7 | Josef Kubeš | Czechoslovakia | 18.40 | |
| 8 | Luigi De Santis | Italy | 18.34 | |
| 9 | Udo Gelhausen | West Germany | 18.09 | |
| 10 | Olli Kanervisto | Finland | 17.37 | |
| | Zlatan Saračević | Yugoslavia | DNS | |
| | Armin Lemme | East Germany | DNS | |
