= Arnaud Ghislain =

Belgian sprinter

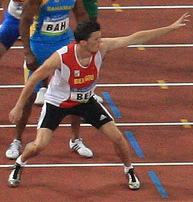
- Arnaud Ghislain at the 2008 Summer Olympics

Personal information
- Nationality: Belgium
- Born: 2 December 1988 (age 37) Belœil, Belgium
- Height: 1.82 m (5 ft 11 1/2 in)
- Weight: 64 kg (141 lb)

Sport
- Sport: Athletics
- Event: 4×400 m relay
- Club: RESC
- Coached by: Alain Carpentier

Achievements and titles
- Personal best: 400 m: 47.71 s (2005)

Arnaud Ghislain (born 2 December 1988) is a Belgian sprinter, who specialized in the 400 metres. He is an indoor national senior champion for his category, and also a member of the Belgian national track relay team.

Ghislain was originally selected as a reserve for the men's 4 × 400 m relay at the 2008 Summer Olympics in Beijing. He was finally named to the national relay team at the start of the heats, when his teammate Kristof Beyens decided to pull out from the competition to focus on his race for the 200 metres. Ghislain set an astonishing national record of 3:00:67, along with his teammates Cedric van Branteghem and twins Kévin and Jonathan Borlée, with a third-place finish in the first heat, giving them a qualifying place for the final round. By the following day, he and his team placed fifth in the finals, with another record-breaking time of 2:59.37.
