= 2018 IAAF World U20 Championships – Men's 4 × 400 metres relay =

Men's 4 × 400 metres relay at the 2018 World Athletics U20 Championships

Medalists
gold medal	Klaudio Gjetja; Andrea Romani; Alessandro Sibilio; Edoardo Scotti	Italy
silver medal	Elija Godwin; Nicholas Ramey; Justin Robinson; Howard Fields	United States
bronze medal	Alex Haydock-Wilson; Joseph Brier; Alastair Chalmers; Alex Knibbs	Great Britain

The men's 4 × 400 metres relay at the 2018 IAAF World U20 Championships will be held at Ratina Stadium on 14 and 15 July.

== Records ==
Standing records prior to the 2018 IAAF World U20 Championships in Athletics
World Junior Record	United States	3:00.33	Trujillo, Peru	23 July 2017
Championship Record	United States	3:01.09	Grosseto, Italy	18 July 2004
World Junior Leading	South Africa	3:08.07	Boksburg, South Africa	28 April 2018

== Results ==
=== Heats ===
Qualification: First 2 of each heat ( Q ) plus the 2 fastest times ( q ) qualified for the final.

Rank	Heat	Nation	Athletes	Time	Notes
1	3	United States	Matthew Boling, Nicholas Ramey, Justin Robinson, Umajesty Williams	3:05.57	Q, WJL
2	1	Great Britain	Alex Haydock-Wilson, Joseph Brier, Ellis Greatrex, Alex Knibbs	3:07.17	Q, WJL
3	2	Italy	Klaudio Gjetja, Andrea Romani, Lorenzo Benati, Edoardo Scotti	3:08.35	Q, SB
4	2	Australia	Adam Kopp, Christian Davis, Harvey Murrant, Ashley Moloney	3:08.53(.522)	Q, SB
5	2	Germany	Justus Ringel, Joscha Bretschneider, Arne Leppelsack, Jean Paul Bredau	3:08.53(.524)	q, SB
6	3	France	Fabrisio Saïdy, Téo Andant, Antoine Leblois, Lidji Mbaye	3:08.78	Q, SB
7	3	Sri Lanka	Pasindu Kodikara, Pabasara Niku, Thiran Ravishka, Aruna Dharshana	3:08.88	q
8	1	Belgium	Simon Mazebo, Sven Van Den Bergh, Rayane Borlée, Jonathan Sacoor	3:09.39	Q, SB
9	3	Switzerland	Julien Bonvin, Ricky Petrucciani, Filippo Moggi, William Reais	3:09.48	NJR
10	3	Zimbabwe	Dickson Clever Kapandura, Ngoni Joel Chadyiwa, Blessing Nyandoro, Leon Tafirenyika	3:09.68	NJR
11	2	Turkey	Akin Özyürek, Mahsum Korkmaz, Ilyas Canakci, Ahmet Kasap	3:09.87	SB
12	1	Japan	Shuji Mori, Daichi Sawa, Hayata Goto, Yusuke Shirao	3:10.06	
13	1	Poland	Jacek Majewski, Sebastian Jakubowski, Adam Mroczek, Szymon Kreft	3:10.68	
14	3	Canada	Khamal Stewart-Baynes, Ruach Chuol Padhal, Nathaniel St. Romain, Myles Misener-Daley	3:11.58	SB
15	1	Ethiopia	Mosisa Siyoum, Melkamu Assefa, Gadisa Bayu, Abdurahman Abdo	3:12.63	SB
16	2	India	Rajesh Ramesh, Devender Kumar, Stanley Cibbinkumar, Ayush Dabas	3:14.19	
17	1	Czech Republic	Ondrej Holub, Vladislav Sadirov, Ladislav Topfer, Tomáš Nemejc	3:14.71	
18	2	South Africa	Malesela Senona, Thembo Monareng, Lourens Steenekamp, Gabriel Louw	3:26.44	
19	1	Jamaica	Malik Smith, Dashawn Morris, Anthony Carpenter, Shemar Chambers	DQ	

=== Final ===
Rank	Nation	Athletes	Time	Notes
1st place, gold medalist(s)	Italy	Klaudio Gjetja, Andrea Romani, Alessandro Sibilio, Edoardo Scotti	3:04.05	WJL, AJR
2nd place, silver medalist(s)	United States	Elija Godwin, Nicholas Ramey, Justin Robinson, Howard Fields	3:05.26	SB
3rd place, bronze medalist(s)	Great Britain	Alex Haydock-Wilson, Joseph Brier, Alastair Chalmers, Alex Knibbs	3:05.64	SB
4	France	Fabrisio Saïdy, Téo Andant, Antoine Leblois, Lidji Mbaye	3:06.65	SB
5	Belgium	Sven Van den Bergh, Jonathan Sacoor, Simon Mazebo, Rayane Borlée	3:07.05	SB
6	Germany	Justus Ringel, Joscha Bretschneider, Arne Leppelsack, Jean Paul Bredau	3:07.80	SB
7	Australia	Adam Kopp, Christian Davis, Harvey Murrant, Ashley Moloney	3:09.31	
8	Sri Lanka	Pasindu Kodikara, Pabasara Niku, Thiran Ravishka, Aruna Dharshana	3:09.38	
