= 1981 European Athletics Indoor Championships – Men's shot put =

The men's shot put event at the 1981 European Athletics Indoor Championships was held on 22 February.

== Results ==
Rank	Name	Nationality	#1	#2	#3	#4	#5	#6	Result	Notes
1st place, gold medalist(s)	Reijo Ståhlberg	Finland	18.57	19.19	19.88	19.39	19.32	x	19.88	
2nd place, silver medalist(s)	Luc Viudès	France	17.87	18.45	18.72	19.41	x	18.22	19.41	
3rd place, bronze medalist(s)	Zlatan Saračević	Yugoslavia	18.87	18.92	x	19.29	19.19	19.40	19.40	
4	Alessandro Andrei	Italy	19.34	x	18.70	18.72	18.76	x	19.34	
5	Remigius Machura	Czechoslovakia	18.01	18.93	19.22	18.92	19.05	18.90	19.22	
6	Hreinn Halldórsson	Iceland	18.43	x	18.01	19.15	x	x	19.15	
7	Óskar Jakobsson	Iceland	18.55	18.73	x	18.88	19.13	x	19.13	
8	Dalibor Vašíček	Czechoslovakia	18.59	18.43	19.09	18.56	18.98	18.97	19.09	
9	Anders Skärvstrand	Sweden	17.97	17.17	18.42				18.42	
10	Markku Tuokko	Finland	18.05	18.38	18.04				18.38	
11	Yves Brouzet	France	17.93	17.45	17.78				17.93	
12	Arnjolt Beer	France	17.66	17.35	x				17.66	
13	Aulis Akonniemi	Finland	17.57	17.60	17.38				17.60	
14	Mike Winch	Great Britain	x	17.18	x				17.18	
	Loukas Louka	Greece	x	x	x				NM	
	Joachim Krug	West Germany	x	x	x				NM	
