= Jonathan Borlée =

Belgian sprinter (born 1988)

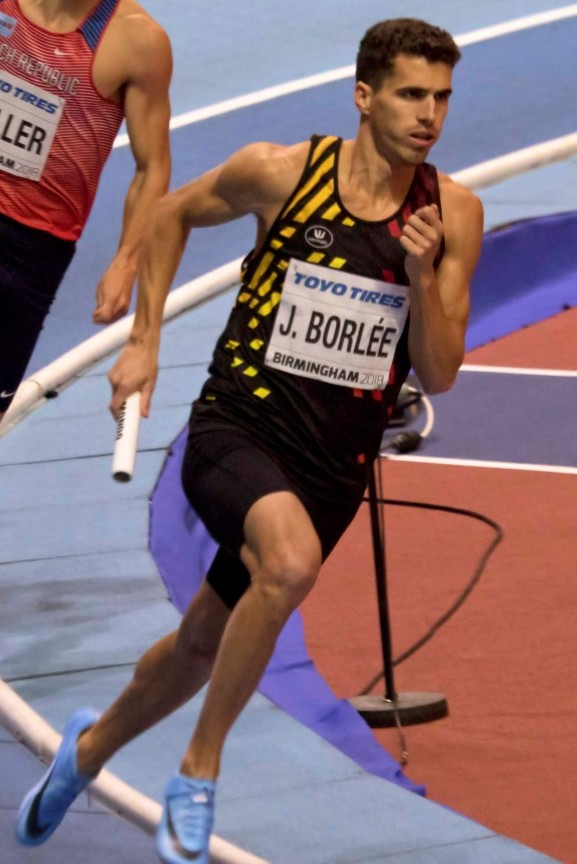
- Jonathan Borlée at the 2018 IAAF World Indoor Championships

Personal information
- Nationality: Belgian
- Born: 22 February 1988 (age 38) Woluwe-Saint-Lambert
- Height: 1.80 m (5 ft 11 in)
- Weight: 69 kg (152 lb)

Sport
- Sport: Athletics
- Event: 400 metres
- College team: Florida State University

Achievements and titles
- Personal bests: 200 m: 20.31 (2012); 400 m: 44.43 (2012)
Medal record
Men's athletics
Representing Belgium
World Indoor Championships
Silver medal – second place	2010 Doha	4 × 400 m relay
Bronze medal – third place	2018 Birmingham	4 × 400 m relay
World Relay Championships
Bronze medal – third place	2015 Nassau	4 × 400 m relay
Bronze medal – third place	2019 Yokohama	4 × 400 m relay
European Championships
Gold medal – first place	2012 Helsinki	4 × 400 m relay
Gold medal – first place	2016 Amsterdam	4 × 400 m relay
Gold medal – first place	2018 Berlin	4 × 400 m relay
Silver medal – second place	2022 Munich	4 × 400 m relay
Bronze medal – third place	2010 Barcelona	4 × 400 m relay
Bronze medal – third place	2018 Berlin	400 m
European Indoor Championships
Gold medal – first place	2015 Prague	4 × 400 m relay
Gold medal – first place	2019 Glasgow	4 × 400 m relay
Bronze medal – third place	2011 Paris	4 × 400 m relay
Event	1st	2nd	3rd
European Championships	3	0	2
World Indoor Championships	0	1	1
European Indoor Championships	2	0	1
World Relays	0	0	2
European Tean C'ships (1st League)	4	0	0
Francophone Games	0	0	1
Total	9	1	7

Jonathan Borlée (French pronunciation: [ʒɔnatɑ̃ bɔʁle]; born 22 February 1988) is a former Belgian sprinter, who specializes in the 400 metres. He is a member of the Borlée family.

He qualified for the finals of the 400 metres at the 2012 Summer Olympics. He was a semi-finalist at the 2008 Summer Olympics and winner at the 2009 NCAA Championships.

Borlée also takes part in the Belgian 4 × 400 m relay team. The team won gold at the 2012, 2016 and 2018 European Championships, and the 2015 European Indoor Championships. The team finished 4th at the 2008 Summer Olympics and at the 2016 Summer Olympics and won silver at the 2010 World Indoor Championships and bronze at the 2010 European Championships.

== Biography ==
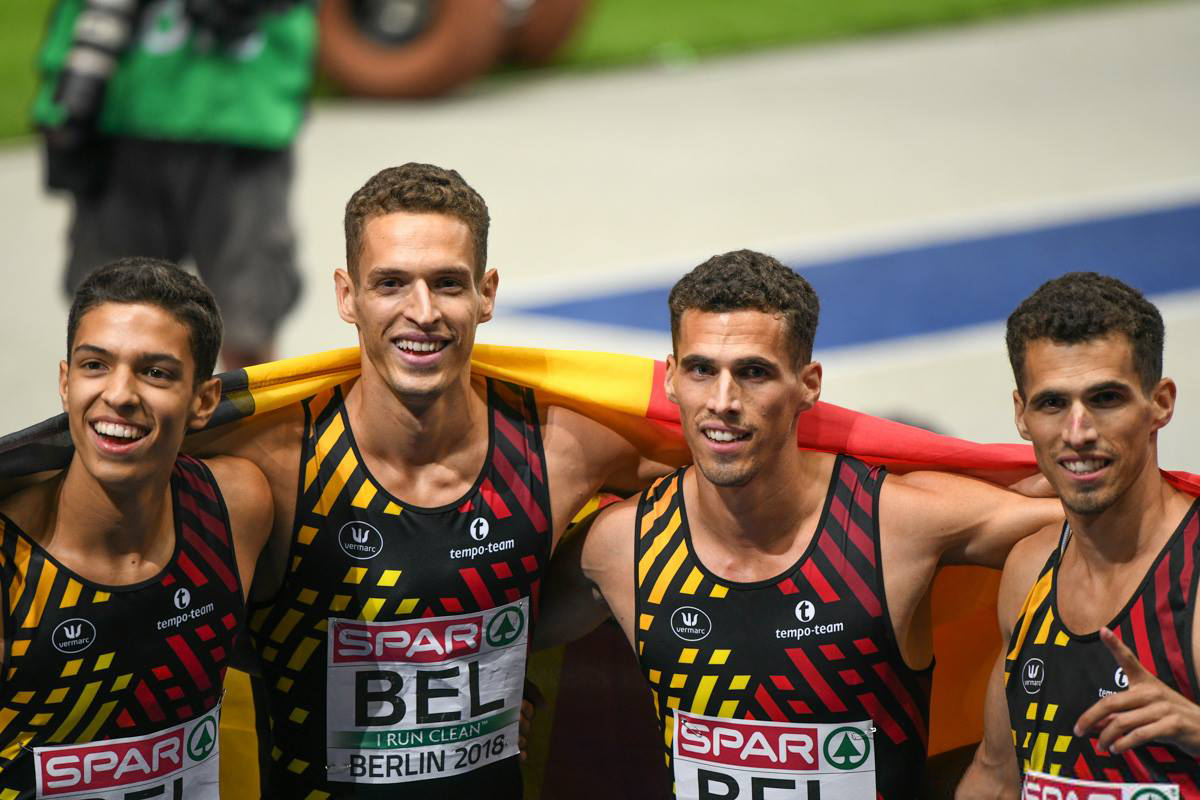
From left Jonathan Sacoor, Dylan Borlée and the twins Kevin and Jonathan Borlée after the victory at Berlin 2018.

=== Borlée family ===
The patriarch of the Borlee family is Jacques, bronze medalist at the 1983 European Indoor Championships in Budapest on 200 m, while his first wife Edith Demaertelaere was a good sprinter with a personal best of 23.89. Six of his seven children are athletes (the first five born from the first marriage with Edith, the last two born from a second marriage).

The eldest daughter Olivia won the gold medal at the Olympics and the world bronze at the 2007 Osaka World Championships with the 4 × 100 m relay and the other daughter Alizia was also a decent sprinter. The four sons are all 400 m specialists, the twins Jonathan and Kevin, both Olympic finalists in London 2012, Dylan and the youngest Rayane. In addition, Jacques' older brother Jean-Pierre was also a sprinter.

=== Early successes ===
Borlée was born in Woluwe-Saint-Lambert. He has an identical twin brother, Kevin (b. 1988), younger brother, Dylan (b. 1992), and an older sister, Olivia (b. 1986), who are also sprinters. All four are trained by their father Jacques Borlée (b. 1957).

Just like his twin brother, Jonathan Borlée obtained his first senior title at the age of 18: the Belgian Indoor championships in 2006 in Ghent, where he won the 200 m, while his brother won the 400 m. Later that year, Borlée would also become the outdoor champion on the 400 m.

On 31 May 2008, Kévin and Jonathan Borlée took part in the 4 × 400 m on a meeting in Neerpelt. Together with Cédric Van Branteghem and Kristof Beyens, they improved a 27-year-old national record by more than a second to 3:02.51s. However, this was 1 hundredth of a second above the qualification time for the Olympic Games. Two weeks later, with Nils Duerinck instead of Kristof Beyens, they broke the national record again in a meeting in Namur to 3:02.13s.

=== National record at Summer Olympics in Beijing ===
On 19 August 2008, at the semi-finals of the 2008 Summer Olympics, Jonathan Borlée ran a new personal best of 45.11s - yet this was not good enough to reach the final.

In the 4 × 400 m relay, with teammates Kévin Borlée, Cédric Van Branteghem and Arnaud Ghislain, they qualified for the final with a new national record of 3:00.67s. They originally finished 5th in the final with yet again a national record of 2:59.37s. The race was won by the American team in 2:55.39s, a new Olympic record. The Russian team, who had finished 3rd, were later disqualified promoting Belgium to 4th place.

=== Moved to the United States ===
At the end of 2008, Jonathan Borlée moved together with his brother Kévin to Tallahassee to enroll in Florida State University. During this period, Jonathan Borlée qualified for the NCAA Championships in Fayetteville, Arkansas. Borlée won the 400 m in 44.78s, a new national record, while his brother Kévin finished 4th in 45.43s. Later on they had a big part in 4 × 400 m relay victory of Florida State with time of 2:59.59s, the second best season time.

Shortly thereafter, Jonathan injured himself: a stress fracture on the tarsus, which ruled him out for the rest of the season, including the 2009 World Championships. Shortly after, brother Kévin suffered the same injury at the opposite foot.

At the end of 2009, Jonathan Borlée received the Golden Spike award.

=== Silver at World Indoor Championships ===
At the beginning of 2010, the Borlée-twins were back in shape. At the 2010 World Indoor Championships, the 4 × 400 m relay team with teammates Nils Duerinck and Antoine Gillet, they won their heat in 3:09.84s, a national indoor record. In the final, with Cédric Van Branteghem instead of Nils Duerinck, they won silver with a time 3:06.94s, another national record. It was the first time a Belgian relay team had ever delivered such a performance.

=== European Championships 2010 ===
Coming into the European Championships in Barcelona, Jonathan Borlée had recorded a new national record of 44.77s at a Diamond League meeting in Paris, just weeks before the championships. This was the fastest European time. Borlée reached the final with two wins in the heats and the semi-finals in 45.91s and 44.71s respectively, the latter being a new national record again. In the final however, Jonathan could not fulfill the expectations and finished 7th in 45.35s. His brother Kévin became the new European Champion in 45.08s after an impressive sprint in the last 50 metres.

The Belgian 4 × 400 m relay team reached the final. Borlée was spared in the heats, but won bronze together with Kévin Borlée, Arnaud Destatte and Cédric Van Branteghem with a time of 3:02.60s.

=== 2012 ===
The Belgian team won the 4 × 400 m at the European Championships.

At the Olympics, Borlée set his current personal best and improved upon his brother's national record for 400 m in the first round of the Olympics. His 44.43 was clearly the best of the round for the entire field. He was not able to match that time in the semi-final but qualified for the final where he finished 6th, .02 behind his brother in 5th. Had he been able to run 44.43 in the final, it would have been good enough for the silver medal.

=== 2015 ===
The Belgian 4 × 400 team that Borlée was in set a new area record in winning the gold medal of the European Indoor Championship. The team also finished 5th at the World Championship.

=== 2016 ===
Borlée qualified for both the 400 m and the 4 × 400 m at the 2016 Olympics, reaching the semifinals in the individual events. The 4 × 400 m team finished in 4th place, setting a new national record. The 4 × 400 m team had previously won the European Championships.

=== European Championships 2018 ===
At the 400 m of the European Championships in Berlin, Jonathan Borlée reached the final with a win in heat 2 in 45.19s and a 2nd-place finish in the 1st semi-final in a personal season's best of 44.87s. In the final, Borlée came in third after Britain's Matthew Hudson-Smith and his twin brother Kevin in 45.19s.

The Belgian 4 × 400 metres relay team, which included Julien Watrin, Robin Vanderbemden, 2018 junior world champion Jonathan Sacoor and younger brother Dylan, reached the final with a win in heat 2 in 3:02.44s, the 4th fastest qualifying time. In the final Julien Watrin and Robin Vanderbemden were replaced by the twin brothers Jonathan and Kevin. The Belgian team won gold in 2:59.47s.

== Achievements ==
=== Major Tournaments ===
Year	Competition	Venue	Position	Event	Notes
Representing Belgium
2006	World Junior Championships	Beijing, China	4th	400 m	46.06
2006	World Junior Championships	Beijing, China	5th	4 × 400 m	3:07.03
2008	Olympic Games	Beijing, China	SF	400 m	45.11 s
2008	Olympic Games	Beijing, China	4th	4 × 400 m	2:59.37 s
2009	NCAA Championships	Fayetteville, Arkansas, US	1st	400 m	44.78 s (NR)
2009	NCAA Championships	Fayetteville, Arkansas, US	1st	4 × 400 m	2:59.59 s
2010	World Indoor Championships	Doha, Qatar	2nd	4 × 400 m	3:06.94 s
2010	European Championships	Barcelona, Spain	7th	400 m	45.35 s (44.71 s (NR) in SF)
2010	European Championships	Barcelona, Spain	3rd	4 × 400 m	3:02.60 s
2011	European Indoor Championships	Paris, France	3rd	4 × 400 m	3:06.57 s (NR)
2012	European Championships	Helsinki, Finland	4th	200 m	20.99 s
2012	European Championships	Helsinki, Finland	1st	4 × 400 m	3:01.09 s
2012	Olympic Games	London, Great Britain	6th	400 m	44.83 s
2012	Olympic Games	London, Great Britain	6th	4 × 400 m	3:01.83 s
2015	European Indoor Championships	Prague, Czech Republic	1st	4 × 400 m	3:02.87 (AR)
2015	IAAF World Relays	Nassau, Bahamas	3rd	4 × 400 m	2:59.33 (NR)
2015	World Championships	Beijing, China	14th (sf)	400 m	44.85 s
2015	World Championships	Beijing, China	5th	4 × 400 m	3:00.24
2016	European Championships	Amsterdam, Netherlands	18th (h)	400 m	47.45 s
2016	European Championships	Amsterdam, Netherlands	1st	4 × 400 m	3:01.10
2016	Olympic Games	Rio de Janeiro, Brazil	32nd (h)	400 m	46.01
2016	Olympic Games	Rio de Janeiro, Brazil	4th	4 × 400 m	2:58.52 (NR)
2017	World Championships	London, United Kingdom	16th (sf)	400 m	45.23
2017	World Championships	London, United Kingdom	4th	4 × 400 m	3:00.04
2018	World Indoor Championships	Birmingham, United Kingdom	3rd	4 × 400 m	3:02.51 (NR)
2018	European Championships	Berlin, Germany	3rd	400 m	45.19
2018	European Championships	Berlin, Germany	1st	4 × 400 m	2:59.47
2019	European Indoor Championships	Glasgow, United Kingdom	1st	4 × 400 m	3:06.27
2019	IAAF World Relays	Yokohama, Japan	3rd	4 × 400 m	3:02.70
2021	European Indoor Championships	Toruń, Poland	4th	4 × 400 m	3:06.96
2021	Olympic Games	Tokyo, Japan	8th (h)	4 × 400 m	2:59.37
2022	European Championships	Munich, Germany	4th (h)	4 × 400 m	3:01.80

=== Personal bests ===
Discipline	Result	Year	Location
Outdoor
200 metres	20.31 s	2012	Lubbock, TX, United States
300 metres	31.87 s (NR)	2012	Liège, Belgium
400 metres	44.43 s (NR)	2012	London, Great Britain
4 × 400 metres relay	2:58.52 (NR)	2016	Rio de Janeiro, Brazil
Indoor
4 × 400 metres relay	3:02.51 s (NR)	2018	Birmingham, United Kingdom

== See also ==
- Borlée family
- Belgian men's 4 × 400 metres relay team
