= Dylan Borlée =

Belgian sprinter (born 1992)

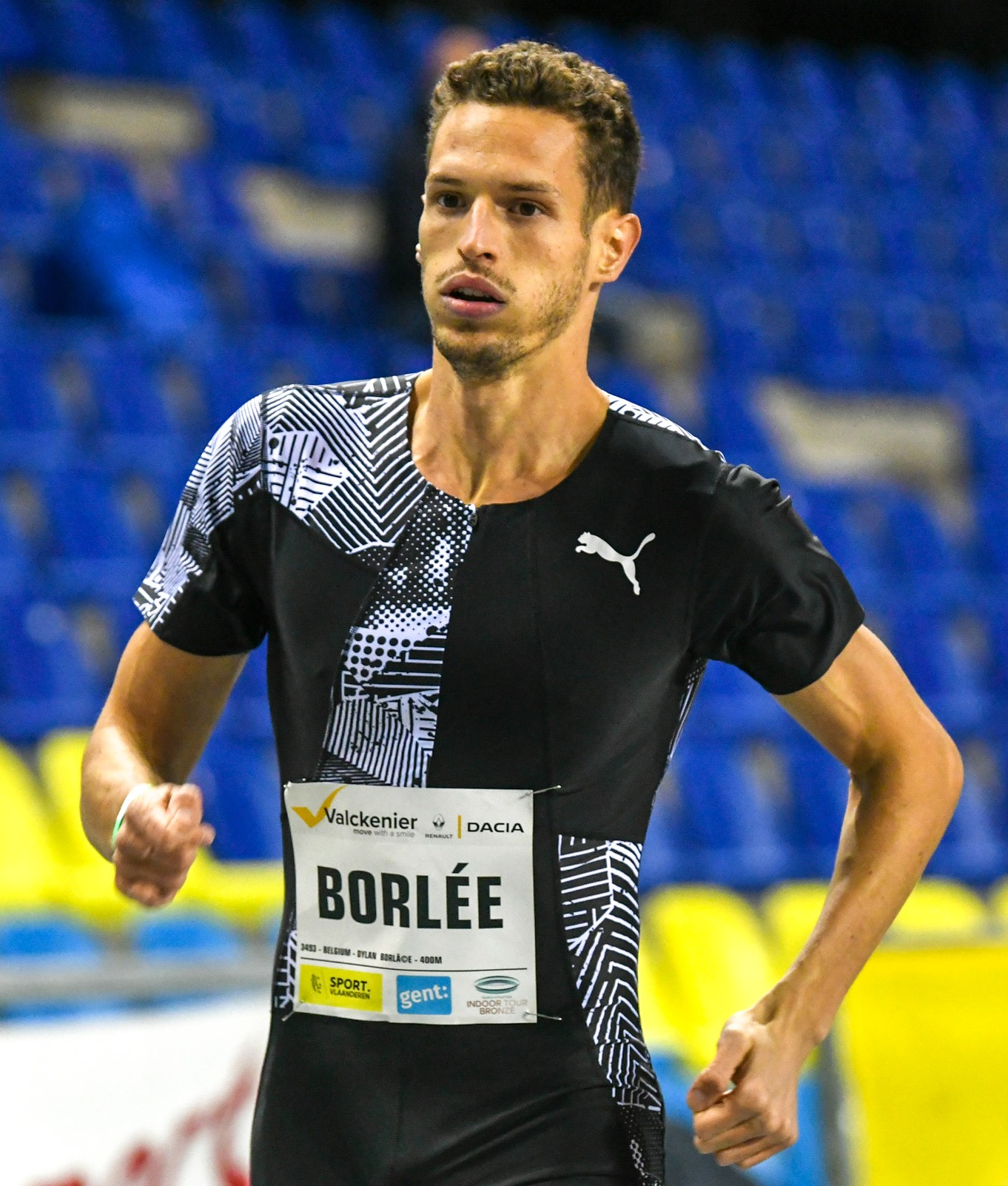
- Borlée at the 2021 Indoor Flanders Meeting.

Personal information
- Nationality: Belgian
- Born: 20 September 1992 (age 33) Woluwe-Saint-Lambert, Belgium
- Height: 1.90 m (6 ft 3 in)
- Weight: 77 kg (170 lb)

Sport
- Country: Belgium
- Sport: Athletics
- Event: 400 metres
- Coached by: Jacques Borlée
Medal record
Representing Belgium
World Championships
Bronze medal – third place	2019 Doha	4 × 400 m relay
Bronze medal – third place	2022 Eugene	4 × 400 m relay
Bronze medal – third place	2025 Tokyo	4 × 400 m mixed
World Indoor Championships
Gold medal – first place	2022 Belgrade	4 × 400 m relay
Gold medal – first place	2024 Glasgow	4 × 400 m relay
Silver medal – second place	2026 Toruń	4 × 400 m relay
Bronze medal – third place	2018 Birmingham	4 × 400 m relay
World Relay Championships
Bronze medal – third place	2015 Nassau	4 × 400 m relay
Bronze medal – third place	2019 Yokohama	4 × 400 m relay
Bronze medal – third place	2024 Nassau	4 × 400 m relay
European Championships
Gold medal – first place	2016 Amsterdam	4 × 400 m relay
Gold medal – first place	2018 Berlin	4 × 400 m relay
Gold medal – first place	2024 Rome	4 × 400 m relay
Silver medal – second place	2022 Munich	4 × 400 m relay
European Indoor Championships
Gold medal – first place	2015 Prague	4 × 400 m relay
Gold medal – first place	2019 Glasgow	4 × 400 m relay
Gold medal – first place	2023 Istanbul	4 × 400 m relay
Silver medal – second place	2015 Prague	400 metres
Silver medal – second place	2017 Belgrade	4 × 400 m relay
European Games
Bronze medal – third place	2023 Kraków-Małopolska	4 × 400 m mixed
Event	1st	2nd	3rd
World Championships	0	0	3
World Indoor Championships	1	0	1
World Relays	0	0	3
European Championships	3	1	0
European Games	0	0	1
European Indoor Championships	2	0	2
Continental Cup	0	1	0
European Tean C'ships (1st League)	1	0	0
Francophone Games	0	1	0
European U23 Championships	1	0	0
Total	8	3	10

Dylan Borlée (born 20 September 1992) is a Belgian sprinter who competes in the 400 metres. He is a member of the Borlée family.

He holds a personal best of 45.09 seconds for the event. He was the silver medallist at the European Athletics Indoor Championships in 2015. He has also represented Belgium at 3 Summer Olympic Games and multiple World Championships and World Relays in Athletics as part of the Belgian men's 4 × 400 metres relay team.

== Biography ==
Born in Woluwe-Saint-Lambert, he is part of the Borlée family which is prominent in Belgian athletics and includes his older sister Olivia (b. 1986) and his older brothers, twins Kevin and Jonathan Borlée (b. 1988). All are coached by their father Jacques Borlée (b. 1957), who was himself a European medallist in the sport.

He made his international debut at the 2011 European Athletics Junior Championships, competing in the 4 × 400 metres relay team, which finished sixth. He began to establish himself as a senior athlete in the 2013 season. First, he secured a relay silver medal with Belgium at the 2013 European Athletics U23 Championships. After setting a 400 m personal best of 45.80 seconds for second place at the Belgian Championships in July, he was selected for Belgium relay team at the 2013 World Championships in Athletics, alongside his brothers and Will Oyowe. The team made the final and finished in fifth overall with a time of 3:01.02 minutes. The Jeux de la Francophonie the following month saw him make his first international appearance for Wallonia. He placed fifth in the individual 400 m and was a silver medallist in the relay alongside Robin Vanderbemden, Antoine Gillet and Oyowe.

Borlée missed most of the 2014 season, bar a relay outing at the 2014 IAAF World Relays, where he was ninth. He returned in strong form for the 2015 indoor season, winning his first national title at the Belgian Indoor Championships. A personal best of 46,73 seconds at a meeting in Metz earned him a place at the 2015 European Athletics Indoor Championships. In his first individual outing for Belgium, he ran a personal best of 46.72 seconds in the semi-final before improving to 46.25 seconds in the final – a mark which was enough to take the silver medal in Prague behind the clear home favourite Pavel Maslák. A day later he won the gold in the 4 × 400 metres relay, along with his brothers and Julien Watrin, in a new European indoor record of 3:02.87. After that followed a long string of medal winning performances at indoor and outdoor European and World championships and World Athletics relays competitions as part of the Belgian men's 4 × 400 metres relay team.

In 2024, at the World Athletics Relays in The Bahamas, he was on the team that qualified Belgium for the men's 4 × 400 metres relay at the 2024 Summer Olympic Games in Paris, France. And later that same year, he was on the Belgian 4 × 400 metres men's relay team that won the gold medal at the European Athletics Championships. Having qualified for the men's 400 metres relay at the 2024 Summer Olympic Games via the World Athletics Rankings, he finished 7th in the heats and was eliminated in the repechages. As a member of the men's 4 × 400 metres relay at the 2024 Summer Olympics, he just missed out on a medal. Despite the team posting a national record in the final, it finished 4th for the 3rd straight Olympics.

In August 2024, he broke 45 seconds for the first time in his career at the 2025 Memorial Van Damme in Brussels, Belgium setting a personal best of 44.94 seconds. Three weeks later, he won a bronze medal at the 2025 World Athletics Championships in Tokyo, Japan with the Belgian team in the mixed 4 × 400 metres relay.

== Borlée family ==
The progenitor of the Borlee family is Jacques, bronze medalist at the 1983 European Indoor Championships in Budapest on 200 m, while his first wife Edith Demaertelaere was a good sprinter with a personal best of 23.89. Six of his seven children are athletes (the first five born from the first marriage with Edith, the last two born from a second marriage).

The eldest daughter Olivia won the gold medal at the Olympics and the world bronze at the 2007 Osaka World Championships with the 4 × 100 m relay and the other daughter Alizia was also a decent sprinter. The four sons are all 400 m specialists, the twins Jonathan and Kevin, both Olympic finalists in London 2012, Dylan and the youngest Rayane. In addition, Jacques' older brother Jean-Pierre was also a sprinter.

== Personal bests ==
Outdoor

- 200 metres – 21.00 (Kortrijk 2023)
- 300 metres – 32.51 (Liège 2017)
- 400 metres – 44.94 (Brussels 2025)

Indoor

- 60 metres – 6.94 (Ghent 2013)
- 200 metres – 21.74 (Ghent 2013)
- 300 metres – 33.33 (Ghent 2015)
- 400 metres – 46.25 (Prague 2015)
- All information from Diamond League.

== International competitions ==
Year	Competition	Venue	Position	Event	Notes
2011	European Junior Championships	Tallinn, Estonia	6th	4 × 400 m relay	3:10.89
2013	European U23 Championships	Tampere, Finland	1st	4 × 400 m relay	3:04.90
2013	World Championships	Moscow, Russia	5th	4 × 400 m relay	3:01.02
2013	Jeux de la Francophonie	Nice, France	5th	400 m	47.25
2013	Jeux de la Francophonie	Nice, France	2nd	4 × 400 m relay	3:06.24
2014	World Relays	Nassau, Bahamas	9th	4 × 400 m relay	3:02.97
2015	European Indoor Championships	Prague, Czech Republic	2nd	400 m	46.25
2015	European Indoor Championships	Prague, Czech Republic	1st	4 × 400 m relay	3:02.87
2015	World Relays	Nassau, Bahamas	3rd	4 × 400 m relay	2:59.33
2015	World Championships	Beijing, China	5th	4 × 400 m relay	3:00.24
2016	European Championships	Amsterdam, Netherlands	1st	4 × 400 m relay	3:01.10
2016	Olympic Games	Rio de Janeiro, Brazil	4th	4 × 400 m relay	2:58.52
2017	European Indoor Championships	Belgrade, Serbia	2nd	4 × 400 m relay	3:07.80
2017	World Relays	Nassau, Bahamas	2nd (B)	4 × 400 m relay	3:07.14
2017	World Championships	London, United Kingdom	4th	4 × 400 m relay	3:00.04
2018	World Indoor Championships	Birmingham, United Kingdom	3rd	4 × 400 m relay	3:02.51 (NR)
2018	European Championships	Berlin, Germany	17th (sf)	400 m	45.63
2018	European Championships	Berlin, Germany	1st	4 × 400 m relay	2:59.47
2019	European Indoor Championships	Glasgow, United Kingdom	1st	4 × 400 m relay	3:06.27
2019	World Relays	Yokohama, Japan	3rd	4 × 400 m	3:02.70
2019	World Championships	Doha, Qatar	3rd	4 × 400 m relay	2.58.78
2021	European Indoor Championships	Toruń, Poland	15th (h)	400 m	46.99
2021	European Indoor Championships	Toruń, Poland	4th	4 × 400 m relay	3:06.96
2021	World Relays	Chorzów, Poland	8th	4 × 400 m relay	3:10.74
2021	Olympic Games	Tokyo, Japan	4th	4 × 400 m relay	2:57.88
2022	World Indoor Championships	Belgrade, Serbia	3rd (h)	4 × 400 m relay	3:07.43
2022	World Championships	Eugene, United States	14th (sf)	400 m	45.41
2022	World Championships	Eugene, United States	3rd	4 × 400 m relay	2:58.72
2022	European Championships	Munich, Germany	5th	400 m	45.39
2022	European Championships	Munich, Germany	2nd	4 × 400 m relay	2:59.49
2023	European Indoor Championships	Istanbul, Turkey	1st	4 × 400 m relay	3:05.83
2023	European Games	Chorzów, Poland	3rd	4 × 400 m mixed	3:12.97
2023	World Championships	Budapest, Hungary	19th (sf)	400 m	45.59
2023	World Championships	Budapest, Hungary	9th (h)	4 × 400 m relay	3:00.33
2024	World Indoor Championships	Glasgow, Scotland	1st	4 × 400 m relay	3:02.54
2024	World Relays	Nassau, Bahamas	3rd	4 × 400 m	3:01.16
2024	European Championships	Rome, Italy	13th (sf)	400 m	45.46
2024	European Championships	Rome, Italy	1st	4 × 400 m	2:59.84 EL
2024	Olympic Games	Paris, France	9th (rep)	400 m	45.51
2024	Olympic Games	Paris, France	4th	4 × 400 m relay	2:57.75 NR
2025	World Championships	Tokyo, Japan	2nd (h)	4 × 400 m relay	2:57.98
2025	World Championships	Tokyo, Japan	3rd	4 × 400 m mixed	3:10.61
2026	World Indoor Championships	Toruń, Poland	4th (h)	4 × 400 m relay	3:05.25
2026	European Championships	Birmingham, England	17th (h)	400 m	46.17
2026	European Championships	Birmingham, England	4th	4 × 400 m relay	2:59.51

== See also ==
- Borlée family
- Belgian men's 4 × 400 metres relay team
