= Kevin Borlée =

Belgian sprinter (born 1988)

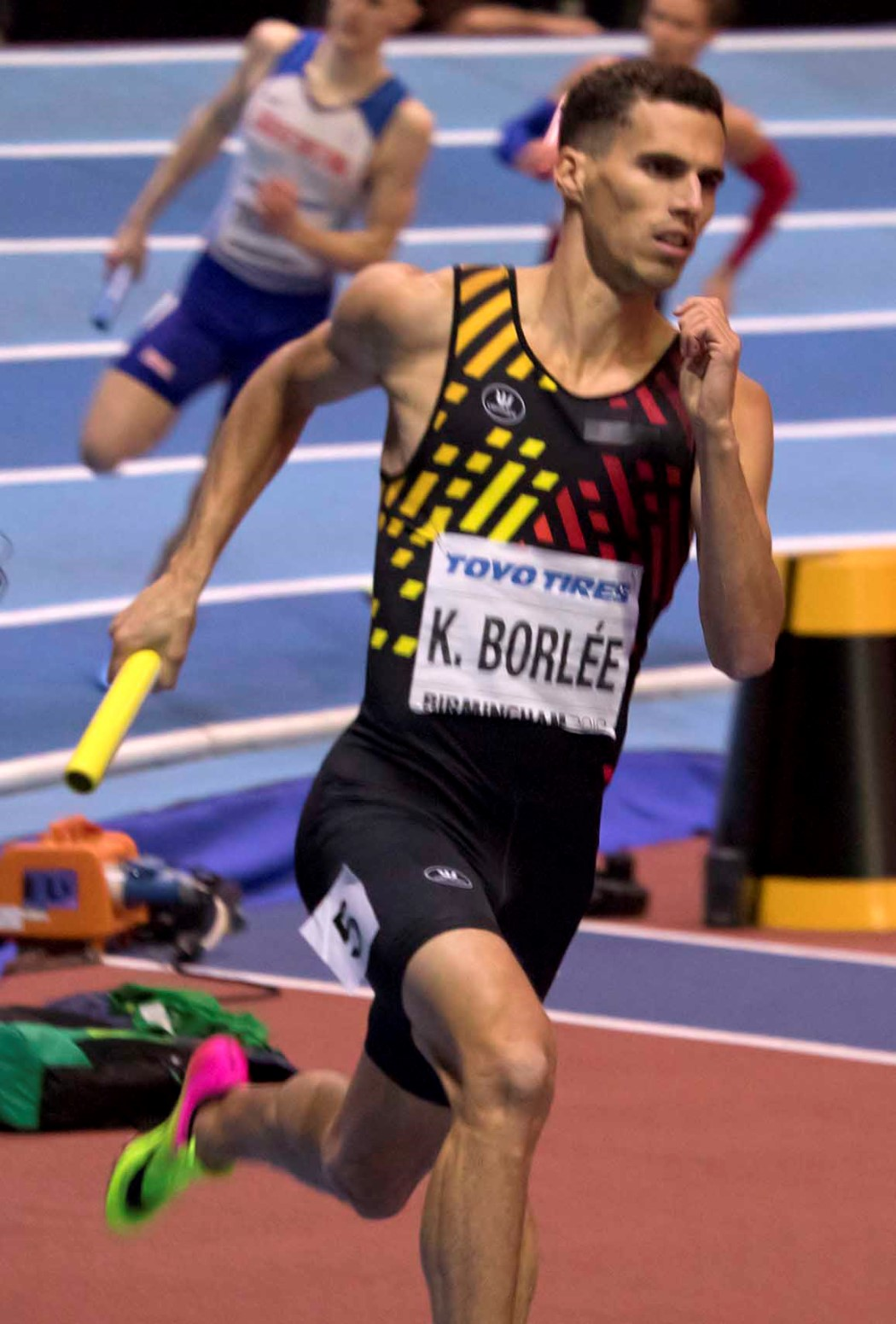
- Kevin Borlée at the 2018 IAAF World Indoor Championships

Personal information
- National team: Belgium
- Born: 22 February 1988 (age 38) Woluwe-Saint-Lambert, Belgium
- Height: 1.80 m (5 ft 11 in)
- Weight: 67 kg (148 lb)

Sport
- Sport: Athletics
- Event: 400 metres
- College team: Florida State University

Achievements and titles
- Personal bests: 100 m: 10.62 (2007); 200 m: 20.84 (2009); 400 m: 44.56 (2012)
Medal record
Men's athletics
Representing Belgium
World Championships
Bronze medal – third place	2011 Daegu	400 metres
Bronze medal – third place	2019 Doha	4 × 400 m relay
Bronze medal – third place	2022 Eugene	4 × 400 m relay
World Indoor Championships
Gold medal – first place	2022 Belgrade	4 × 400 m relay
Silver medal – second place	2010 Doha	4 × 400 m relay
Bronze medal – third place	2018 Birmingham	4 × 400 m relay
World Relays
Bronze medal – third place	2015 Nassau	4 × 400 m relay
European Championships
Gold medal – first place	2010 Barcelona	400 metres
Gold medal – first place	2012 Helsinki	4 × 400 m relay
Gold medal – first place	2016 Amsterdam	4 × 400 m relay
Gold medal – first place	2018 Berlin	4 × 400 m relay
Silver medal – second place	2018 Berlin	400 metres
Silver medal – second place	2022 Munich	4 × 400 m relay
Bronze medal – third place	2010 Barcelona	4 × 400 m relay
European Indoor Championships
Gold medal – first place	2015 Prague	4 × 400 m relay
Gold medal – first place	2019 Glasgow	4 × 400 m relay
Gold medal – first place	2023 Istanbul	4 × 400 m relay
Silver medal – second place	2017 Belgrade	4 × 400 m relay
Bronze medal – third place	2011 Paris	4 × 400 m relay
Event	1st	2nd	3rd
World Championships	0	0	3
European Championships	4	2	1
World Indoor Championships	1	1	1
European Indoor Championships	2	1	1
World Relays	0	0	1
Continental Cup	0	1	0
European Tean C'ships (1st League)	3	0	0
Francophone Games	0	0	1
Total	10	5	8

Kevin Borlée (French pronunciation: [kevin bɔʁle]; born 22 February 1988) is a Belgian sprinter, who specializes in the 400 metres. He is a member of the Borlée family.

Borlée won bronze at the 2011 World Championships in the 400 m. He qualified for the finals of the 400 metres at the 2012 Summer Olympics. He was also a semi-finalist at both the 2008 Summer Olympics and the 2009 World Championships, and is the 2010 European Champion on this distance.

Borlée also competes with the Belgian 4 × 400 m relay team. The team won gold at the 2012, 2016 and 2018 European Championships, and the 2015 European Indoor Championships. The team finished 4th at the 2008 Summer Olympics, 4th at the 2009 World Championships, won silver at the 2010 World Indoor Championships and bronzes at the 2019 World Athletics Championships and the 2010 European Championships, 6th at the 2012 Summer Olympics and 4th at the 2016, 2020 and 2024 Summer Olympics.

== Biography ==
=== Early successes ===
He has an identical twin brother, Jonathan (b. 1988), younger brother, Dylan (b. 1992), and an older sister, Olivia (b. 1986), who are also sprinters. All four are trained by their father Jacques (b. 1957).

Just like his twin brother, Kevin Borlée obtained his first senior title at the age of 18: the Belgian Indoor championships in 2006 in Ghent, where he won the 400 m, while his brother won the 200 m. Later on, Borlée would add 3 more Belgian indoor titles: once more on the 400 m and two on the 200 m.

On 31 May 2008 Kevin and Jonathan took part in the 4 × 400 m on a meeting in Neerpelt. Together with Cédric Van Branteghem and Kristof Beyens, they improved a 27-year-old national record by more than a second to 3:02.51s. However, this was 1 hundred of a second above the qualification time for the Olympic Games. Two weeks later, with Nils Duerinck instead of Kristof Beyens, they broke the national record again in a meeting in Namur to 3:02.13s.

=== National records at Summer Olympics in Beijing ===
On 19 August 2008, during the semi-finals of the 2008 Summer Olympics, Kevin Borlée ran a new national record of 44.88s, improving the former record of Cédric Van Branteghem by 14 hundredths of a second. Despite he did not reach the final.

On the 4 × 400 m relay, with teammates Jonathan Borlée, Cédric Van Branteghem and Arnaud Ghislain, they qualified for the final with a new national record of 3:00.67s. They finished 5th in the final with yet again a national record of 2:59.37s. The race was won by the US team in 2:55.39s, a new Olympic record. The Russian team, who had finished 3rd, were later disqualified promoting Belgium to fourth place.

At the end of 2008, Borlée received the Belgian Golden Spike award.

=== Move to the United States ===
At the end of 2008, Kevin Borlée moved together with his brother Jonathan to Tallahassee to enroll in Florida State University. During this period, Borlée qualified for the NCAA-championships in Fayetteville, Arkansas. Borlée finished 4th on the 400 m in 45.43s in a race that was won by his brother Jonathan in 44.78s, a new national record. Later on they had a big part in 4 × 400 m relay victory of Florida State with time of 2:59.59s, the second best season time.

A couple of months later, at the 2009 World Championships, Borlée reached the semi-finals on the 400 m with 45.28s. On the 4 × 400 m relay with teammates Antoine Gillet, Nils Duerinck and Cédric Van Branteghem (Jonathan was out with a stress fracture), they finished 1st in their heat with 3:02.13s and finished 4th in the final in 3:01.88s.

=== Identical injury ===
Directly after the World Championships, it became clear that Kevin Borlée had sustained the same injury that ruled out his brother Jonathan 6 weeks earlier: a stress fracture on the tarsus. The story shows many similarities with the stress fracture of the tibia of the Swedish hurdles sprinters Susanna and Jenny Kallur. Both had the same injury at the different leg.

=== Silver at World Indoor Championships ===
At the beginning of 2010, the Borlée-twins were back in shape. At the 2010 World Indoor Championships, the 4 × 400 m relay team with teammates Nils Duerinck and Antoine Gillet, they won their heat in 3:09.84s, a national indoor record. In the final, with Cédric Van Branteghem instead of Nils Duerinck, they won silver with a time 3:06.94s, another national record. It was the first time a Belgian relay team had ever delivered such a performance.

=== European Championships 2010 ===
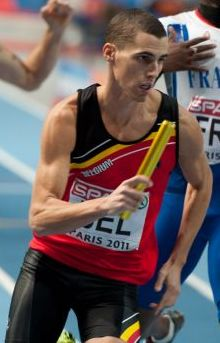
Kevin Borlée at the 2011 European Championships.

At the 400 m of the European Championships in Barcelona, Kevin Borlée reached the final with two wins in the heats and the semi-finals in 45.71s and 45.32s respectively. In the final, Borlée seemed to fall back after a good start, but with an impressive sprint in the last 50 m, he passed the pack to win in front of Britain's Michael Bingham and Martyn Rooney in 45.08s, a season's best. With this win, he is only the third Belgian male athlete to become a European Champion. The last one was Karel Lismont on the marathon in 1971, the first one Gaston Roelants in 1962 on the steeple chase. His brother Jonathan finished 7th in 45.35s.

The Belgian 4 × 400 m relay team, which besides Kevin Borlée included Antoine Gillet, Cédric Van Branteghem and Nils Duerinck, reached the final. With 3:03.49s, they had the fastest time. In the final Antoine Gillet and Nils Duerinck were replaced by Arnaud Destatte and Jonathan Borlée. The Belgian team won bronze in 3:02.60s.

=== 2012 ===
The Belgian team won the 4 × 400 m at the European Championships.

At the Olympics, Borlée reached the final of the 400 m, finishing 5th.

=== 2015 ===
The Belgian 4 × 400 team that Borlée was in set a new area record in winning the gold medal of the European Indoor Championship. The team also finished 5th at the World Championship.

=== 2016 ===
Borlée qualified for both the 400 m and the 4 × 400 m at the 2016 Olympics, reaching the semi-finals in the individual events. The 4 × 400 m team finished in 4th place, setting a new national record. The 4 × 400 m team had previously won the European Championships.

=== European Championships 2018 ===
At the 400 m of the European Championships in Berlin, Kevin Borlée reached the final with a win in heat 1 in 45.29s and a 3rd-place finish in the 3rd semi-final in 45.07s (fastest losing time) . In the final, Borlée had his trade mark slow start, but with an impressive sprint in the last 100 m, he passed the pack to come in second after Britain's Matthew Hudson-Smith in 45.13s. Jonathan finished 3rd in 45.19s.

The Belgian 4 × 400 m relay team, which included Julien Watrin, Robin Vanderbemden, 2018 junior world champion Jonathan Sacoor and younger brother Dylan, reached the final with a win in heat 2 in 3:02.44s, the 4th fastest qualifying time. In the final Julien Watrin and Robin Vanderbemden were replaced by the twin brothers Kevin and Jonathan. The Belgian team won gold in 2:59.47s.

== Borlée family ==
The progenitor of the Borlee family is Jacques, bronze medalist at the 1983 European Indoor Championships in Budapest on 200 m, while his first wife Edith Demaertelaere was a good sprinter with a personal best of 23.89. Six of his seven children are athletes (the first five born from the first marriage with Edith, the last two born from a second marriage).

The eldest daughter Olivia won the gold medal at the Olympics and the world bronze at the 2007 Osaka World Championships with the 4 × 100 m relay and the other daughter Alizia was also a decent sprinter. The four sons are all 400 m specialists, the twins Jonathan and Kevin, both Olympic finalists in London 2012, Dylan and the youngest Rayane. In addition, Jacques' older brother Jean-Pierre was also a sprinter.

== Achievements ==
=== Major tournaments ===
Year	Competition	Venue	Position	Event	Notes
Representing Belgium
2006	World Junior Championships	Beijing, China	14th (sf)	400 m	46.95
2006	World Junior Championships	Beijing, China	5th	4 × 400 m	3:07.03
2008	Olympic Games	Beijing, China	8th (sf)	400 m	44.88 NR
2008	Olympic Games	Beijing, China	4th	4 × 400 m	2:59.37
2009	NCAA Championships	Fayetteville, United States	4th	400 m	45.43
2009	NCAA Championships	Fayetteville, United States	1st	4 × 400 m	2:59.59
2009	World Championships	Berlin, Germany	12th (sf)	400 m	45.28
2009	World Championships	Berlin, Germany	4th	4 × 400 m	3:01.88
2010	World Indoor Championships	Doha, Qatar	2nd	4 × 400 m	3:06.94
2010	European Championships	Barcelona, Spain	1st	400 m	45.08
2010	European Championships	Barcelona, Spain	3rd	4 × 400 m	3:02.60
2011	European Indoor Championships	Paris, France	3rd	4 × 400 m	3:06.57 NR
2011	World Championships	Daegu, South Korea	3rd	400 m	44.90
2012	European Championships	Helsinki, Finland	1st	4 × 400 m	3:01.09
2012	Olympic Games	London, Great Britain	5th	400 m	44.81
2012	Olympic Games	London, Great Britain	6th	4 × 400 m	3:01.83
2015	European Indoor Championships	Prague, Czech Republic	1st	4 × 400 m	3:02.87 AR
2015	World Championships	Beijing, China	11th (sf)	400 m	44.74
2015	World Championships	Beijing, China	5th	4 × 400 m	3:00.24
2016	European Championships	Amsterdam, Netherlands	4th	400 m	45.60
2016	European Championships	Amsterdam, Netherlands	1st	4 × 400 m	3:01.10
2016	Olympic Games	Rio de Janeiro, Brazil	28th (h)	400 m	45.90
2016	Olympic Games	Rio de Janeiro, Brazil	4th	4 × 400 m	2:58.52 NR
2017	European Indoor Championships	Belgrade, Serbia	2nd	4 × 400 m	3:07.80
2017	IAAF World Relays	Nassau, Bahamas	2nd (B)	4 × 400 m	3:07.14
2017	World Championships	London, United Kingdom	11th (sf)	400 m	45.10
2017	World Championships	London, United Kingdom	4th	4 × 400 m	3:00.04
2018	World Indoor Championships	Birmingham, United Kingdom	3rd	4 × 400 m	3:02.51 NR
2018	European Championships	Berlin, Germany	2nd	400 m	45.13
2018	European Championships	Berlin, Germany	1st	4 × 400 m	2:59.47
2019	European Indoor Championships	Glasgow, United Kingdom	1st	4 × 400 m	3:06.27
2019	World Championships	Doha, Qatar	3rd	4 × 400 m	2.58.78
2021	European Indoor Championships	Toruń, Poland	4th	4 × 400 m	3:06.96
2021	World Relays	Chorzów, Poland	8th	4 × 400 m	3:10.74
2021	Olympic Games	Tokyo, Japan	15th (h)	400 m	45.36^{1}
2021	Olympic Games	Tokyo, Japan	4th	4 × 400 m	2:57.88
2022	World Indoor Championships	Belgrade, Serbia	1st	4 × 400 m	3:06.52
2022	World Championships	Eugene, United States	12th (sf)	400 m	45.26
2022	World Championships	Eugene, United States	3rd	4 × 400 m	2:58.72
2022	European Championships	Munich, Germany	DNF (sf)	400 m	
2022	European Championships	Munich, Germany	2nd	4 × 400 m	2:59.49
2023	European Indoor Championships	Istanbul, Turkey	1st	4 × 400 m relay	3:05.83
2024	Olympic Games	Paris, France	4th	4 × 400 m relay	2:57.75 NR

^{1}Did not start in the semifinal

=== Personal bests ===
Discipline	Result	Year	Location
Outdoor
100 metres	10.57 s	2017	Brussels, Belgium
200 metres	20.72 s	2011	Brussels, Belgium
300 metres	32.22 s	2017	Liège, Belgium
400 metres	44.56 s	2012	Brussels, Belgium
4 × 400 metres relay	2:57.75 s NR	2024	Paris, France
Indoor
400 metres	46.41 s	2018	Ghent, Belgium
4 × 400 metres relay	3:02.51 s NR	2018	Birmingham, United Kingdom

== See also ==
- Borlée family
- Belgian men's 4 × 400 metres relay team
