= Dalibor Vašíček =

Czech shot putter

Personal information
- Born: 16 May 1954 (age 72)

Sport
- Sport: Track and field
Medal record
Representing Czechoslovakia
Summer Universiade
Bronze medal – third place	1981 Bucharest	Shot put

Dalibor Vašíček (born 16 May 1954) is a retired Czech shot putter.

He finished eighth at the 1981 European Indoor Championships, and won the bronze medal at the 1981 Summer Universiade. Domestically he won the 1981 Czechoslovak indoor championships.

His personal best put was 19.70 metres, achieved in September 1980 in Budapest.
