= 2015 European Athletics Indoor Championships – Men's 4 × 400 metres relay =

The men's 4 × 400 metres relay event at the 2015 European Athletics Indoor Championships was held on 8 March at 17:55 local time as a straight final.

== Results ==
Rank	Nationality	Athlete	Time	Notes
1st place, gold medalist(s)	Belgium	Julien Watrin; Dylan Borlée; Jonathan Borlée; Kevin Borlée	3:02.87	WL, ER
2nd place, silver medalist(s)	Poland	Karol Zalewski; Rafał Omelko; Łukasz Krawczuk; Jakub Krzewina	3:02.97	NR
3rd place, bronze medalist(s)	Czech Republic	Daniel Němeček; Patrik Šorm; Jan Tesař; Pavel Maslák	3:04.09	NR
4	Russia	Aleksey Kenig; Pavel Savin; Nikita Vesnin; Lev Mosin	3:08.00	
5	Great Britain	Conrad Williams; Jamie Bowie; Jarryd Dunn; Rabah Yousif	3:08.56	
6	Ireland	Dara Kervick; Tim Crowe; Harry Purcell; Brandon Arrey	3:10.61	
