= 2018 European Athletics Championships – Men's 4 × 400 metres relay =

Men's 4 × 400 metres relay at the 2018 European Athletics Championships
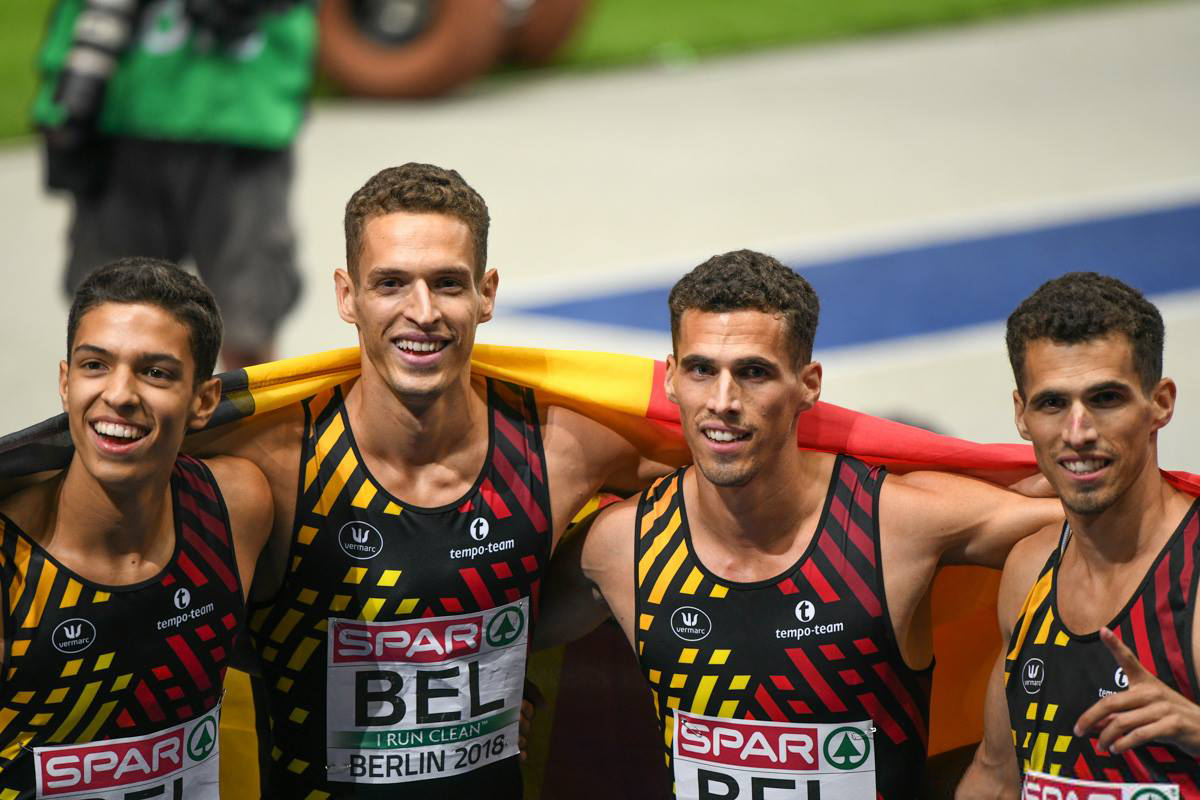
- From left Jonathan Sacoor, Dylan Borlée and the twins Kevin and Jonathan Borlée, the winner team.
- Venue: Olympic Stadium
- Location: Berlin
- Dates: August 10 (round 1); August 11 (final)
- Competitors: 77 from 16 nations
- Winning time: 2:59.47

Medalists
gold medal	Dylan Borlée; Jonathan Borlée; Jonathan Sacoor; Kévin Borlée; Robin Vanderbemden*; Julien Watrin*	Belgium
silver medal	Rabah Yousif; Dwayne Cowan; Matthew Hudson-Smith; Martyn Rooney; Cameron Chalmers*	Great Britain
bronze medal	Óscar Husillos; Lucas Búa; Samuel García; Bruno Hortelano; Darwin Echeverry*; Mark Ujakpor*	Spain

The Men's 4 × 400 metres relay at the 2018 European Athletics Championships took place at the Olympic Stadium on 10 and 11 August.

== Records ==
Standing records prior to the 2018 European Athletics Championships
World record	United States; Andrew Valmon, Quincy Watts; Butch Reynolds, Michael Johnson	2:54.29	Stuttgart, Germany	22 August 1993
European record	Great Britain; Iwan Thomas, Jamie Baulch; Mark Richardson, Roger Black	2:56.60	Atlanta, United States	3 August 1996
Championship record	Great Britain; Paul Sanders, Kriss Akabusi; John Regis, Roger Black	2:58.22	Split, Yugoslavia	1 September 1990
World Leading	University of Southern California; Ricky Morgan, Rai Benjamin; Zachary Shinnick, Michael Norman	2:59.00	Eugene, United States	8 June 2018
European Leading	Italy; Daniele Corsa, Michele Tricca; Vladimir Aceti, Davide Re	3:02.11	Bern, Switzerland	16 June 2018
Broken records during the 2018 European Athletics Championships
European Leading	Great Britain; Cameron Chalmers, Dwayne Cowan; Rabah Yousif, Martyn Rooney	3:01.62	Berlin, Germany	10 August 2018
European Leading	Belgium; Dylan Borlée, Jonathan Borlée; Jonathan Sacoor, Kevin Borlée	2:59.47	Berlin, Germany	11 August 2018

== Schedule ==
Date	Time	Round
10 August 2018	13:05	Round 1
11 August 2018	21:30	Final

== Results ==
=== Round 1 ===
First 3 in each heat (Q) and 2 best performers (q) advance to the Final.

Rank	Heat	Nation	Athletes	Time	Notes
1	1	Great Britain	Cameron Chalmers, Dwayne Cowan, Rabah Yousif, Martyn Rooney	3:01.62	Q, EL
2	1	France	Mame-Ibra Anne, Mamadou Kassé Hanne, Teddy Atine, Thomas Jordier	3:01.67	Q, SB
3	1	Czech Republic	Patrik Šorm, Michal Desenský, Vít Müller, Pavel Maslák	3:02.52	Q, NR
4	2	Belgium	Julien Watrin, Robin Vanderbemden, Jonathan Sacoor, Dylan Borlée	3:02.55	Q
5	1	Poland	Dariusz Kowaluk, Rafał Omelko, Mateusz Rzeźniczak, Kajetan Duszyński	3:02.75	q
6	1	Germany	Marvin Schlegel, Torben Junker, Fabian Dammermann, Johannes Trefz	3:03.37	q
7	2	Italy	Edoardo Scotti, Michele Tricca, Vladimir Aceti, Davide Re	3:04.08	Q
8	2	Spain	Mark Ujakpor, Lucas Búa, Darwin Echeverry, Samuel García	3:04.62	Q, SB
9	2	Netherlands	Tony van Diepen, Liemarvin Bonevacia, Ramsey Angela, Nick Smidt	3:04.93	
10	1	Ukraine	Oleksiy Pozdnyakov, Danylo Danylenko, Stanislav Senyk, Vitaliy Butrym	3:03.93	SB
11	2	Ireland	Christopher O'Donnell, Brandon Arrey, Leon Reid, Thomas Barr	3:06.55	SB
12	2	Croatia	Mateo Ružić, Hrvoje Čukman, Sven Cepuš, Mateo Kovačić	3:07.80	SB
13	2	Turkey	Abdullah Tütünci, Yavuz Can, Akin Özyürek, Batuhan Altıntaş	3:07.83	
14	2	Romania	Cristian Radu, Cosmin Trofin, David-Iustin Nastase, Robert Parge	3:10.08	
	1	Sweden	Carl Bengtström, Erik Martinsson, Dennis Forsman, Joel Groth	DQ	170.20
	1	Switzerland	Jonas Gehrig, Ricky Petrucciani, Joel Burgunder, Charles Devantay	DQ	163.3 (b)

=== Final ===
Rank	Lane	Nation	Athletes	Time	Notes
1st place, gold medalist(s)	3	Belgium	Dylan Borlée, Jonathan Borlée, Jonathan Sacoor, Kevin Borlée	2:59.47	EL
2nd place, silver medalist(s)	5	Great Britain	Rabah Yousif, Dwayne Cowan, Matthew Hudson-Smith, Martyn Rooney	3:00.36	SB
3rd place, bronze medalist(s)	7	Spain	Óscar Husillos, Lucas Búa, Samuel García, Bruno Hortelano	3:00.78	SB
4	6	France	Ludvy Vaillant, Mamadou Kassé Hanne, Teddy Atine, Thomas Jordier	3:02.08	
5	2	Poland	Karol Zalewski, Rafał Omelko, Łukasz Krawczuk, Kajetan Duszyński	3:02.27	
6	4	Italy	Edoardo Scotti, Michele Tricca, Davide Re, Matteo Galvan	3:02.34	
7	8	Czech Republic	Jan Tesař, Pavel Maslák, Patrik Šorm, Filip Šnejdr	3:03.00	
8	1	Germany	Patrick Schneider, Torben Junker, Fabian Dammermann, Johannes Trefz	3:04.69	

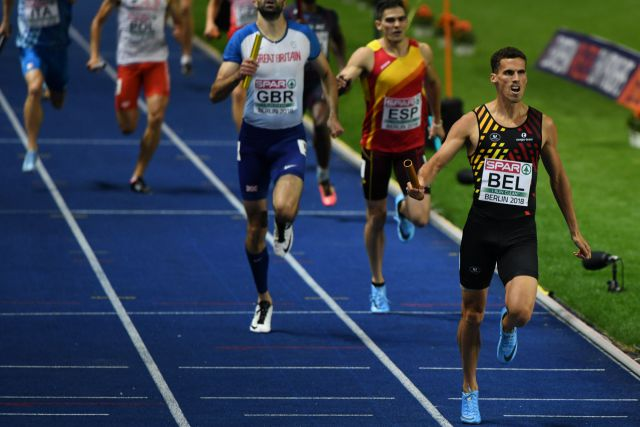
Belgium finishing first in the final
