= Rayane Borlée =

Belgian sprinter

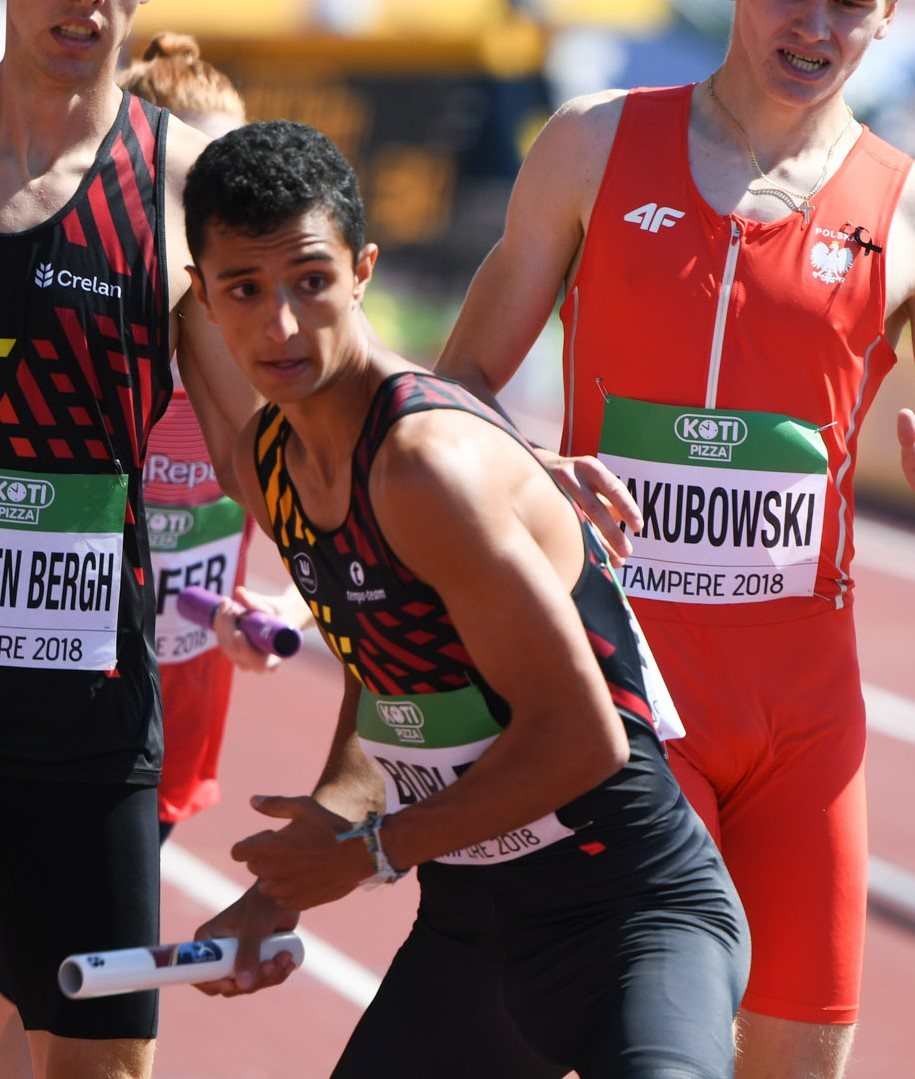

Personal information
- National team: Belgium
- Born: 12 May 1999 (age 27) Woluwe-Saint-Lambert, Belgium

Sport
- Sport: Athletics
- Event: 400 metres
- Coached by: Jacques Borlée

Achievements and titles
- Personal best: 400 m: 48.86 (2018)

Rayane Borlée (born 28 June 1999) is a Belgian sprinter.

== Borlée family ==
The progenitor of the Borlee family is Jacques (born 1957), bronze medalist at the 1983 European Indoor Championships in Budapest on 200 m, while his first wife Edith Demaertelaere (born 1964) was a good sprinter with a personal best of 23.89. Six of his seven children are athletes (the first five born from the first marriage with Edith, the last two born from a second marriage).

The eldest daughter Olivia (born 1986) won the gold medal at the Olympics and the world bronze at the 2007 Osaka World Championships with the 4 × 100 m relay and the other daughter Alizia (born 1991) was also a decent sprinter. The four sons are all 400 m specialists, the twins Jonathan and Kevin (born 1988), both Olympic finalists in London 2012, Dylan (born 1992) and the youngest Rayane. In addition, Jacques' older brother Jean-Pierre (born 1947) was also a sprinter.

== Achievements ==
Year	Competition	Venue	Rank	Event	Time	Notes
2018	World U20 Championships	(Finland) Tampere	5th	4 × 400 m relay	3:07.05	SB

== See also ==
- Borlée
