= Jacques Borlée =

Former Belgian athlete

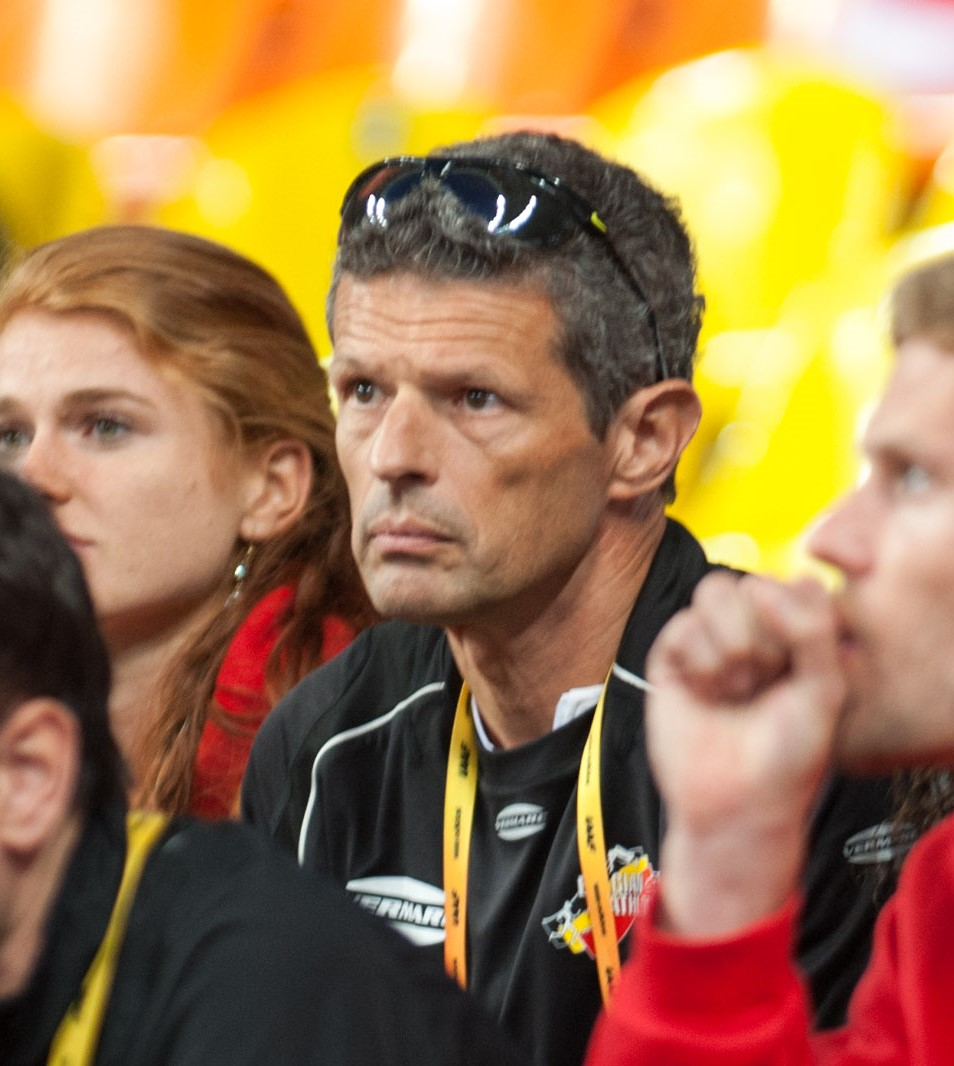
- Jacques Borlée

Personal information
- Born: 27 September 1957 (age 68) Stanleyville, Belgian Congo
Medal record
Men's athletics
Representing Belgium
European Athletics Indoor Championships
| Silver medal – second place | 1983 Budapest | 200 m |

Jacques Borlée (born 27 September 1957) is a Belgian former athlete and athletics coach. He was voted European Athletics Coach of the Year in 2011. The progenitor of the Borlée family, he is the father and coach of athletes Olivia Borlée (b. 1986), Kevin (b. 1988), Jonathan (b. 1988) and Dylan Borlée (b. 1992).

== Early life ==
Jacques Borlée was born in Stanleyville, in the Belgian Congo, in 1957, three years before the independence of the country. His father was the last Belgian governor of the Kivu province. The family moved to Brussels in Belgium in 1960. Jacques Borlée married Edith de Maertelaere, a former Belgian champion over 200m runner. They have five children together. Jacques Borlée also has two children from a second marriage.

== Athlete ==
Jacques Borlée was a sprinter, specializing in 100m, 200m and 400m, winning eight Belgian titles in total. He was Belgian champion over 100m in 1981 and 1983, Belgian champion over 200m in 1979, 1981, 1983 and 1984, Belgian champion over 400m in 1982, and Belgian champion over 400m hurdles in 1977. In 1983, he won a silver medal at the 1983 European Athletics Indoor Championships in Budapest over 200m. In 1980, he competed at the 1980 Summer Olympics in Moscow, reaching the quarterfinals of the 400 meters. At the 1978 European Athletics Championships in Prague he ended fifth as part of the 4 × 400 m relay team. At the 1982 European Athletics Championships in Athens, he ended fifth in his first round race over 400m.

His personal record over 400m is 45.4 seconds, set in 1979.

== Coach ==
Jacques Borlée is the coach of four of his children, the twins Kevin and Jonathan (b. 1988), their brother Dylan (b. 1992) and their sister Olivia (b. 1986). He also coaches the men's 4x400 relay team. On 4 October 2011, he was voted the European coach of the year.

Athletes he coached won medals at major championships. His daughter Olivia won a gold medal as part of the 4 × 100 m relay team at the 2008 Summer Olympics in Beijing, in a new Belgian record time. The Belgian 4 × 400 m relay team, including his two sons Kevin and Jonathan, ended fourth at the same games, also setting a new national record in that race.

At the 2007 World Championships in Athletics in Osaka, the women's 4 × 100 m relay team, with his daughter Olivia, won the bronze medal. 4 Years later, at the 2011 World Championships in Athletics in Daegu, Kevin won the bronze medal in the 400m individual, with Jonathan ending in fifth place.

At the 2010 European Athletics Championships in Barcelona, Kevin won the gold medal in the 400m race, while the 4 × 400 m relay team with the two Borlée brothers won the bronze medal. The team achieved the same at the 2011 European Athletics Indoor Championships as well.

Olivia Borlée was the national champion of Belgium over 100m in 2008 and 2009, and over 200m in 2009. Kevin Borlée was Belgian champion over 400m in 2007 and over 200m in 2009, and Jonathan was champion over 400m in 2006. The Gouden Spike, the award for the Belgian Athlete of the Year, was won by Kevin in 2008 and 2010, and by Jonathan in 2009. Each time the other brother finished second. In 2008, Kevin was also the promising new athlete of the year, and Jonathan was the same in 2006. Olivia Borlée was the promising new athlete of 2003, and finished in third place in the female Gouden Spike in 2008 and 2009.

His sons have also repeatedly broken the national record at the 400m.

== Borlée family ==
The progenitor of the Borlée family is Jacques, bronze medalist at the 1983 European Athletics Indoor Championships in Budapest on 200 m, while his first wife Edith Demaertelaere was a good sprinter with a personal best of 23.89. Six of his seven children are athletes (the first five were born of his first marriage to Edith, the last two of his second marriage).

The eldest daughter Olivia won the gold medal at the Olympics, and the world bronze at the 2007 World Athletics Championships in Osaka with the 4 × 100 m relay, and the other daughter Alizia was also a decent sprinter. The four sons are all 400 m specialists, the twins Jonathan and Kevin, both Olympic finalists in London 2012, Dylan and the youngest Rayane. In addition, Jacques' older brother Jean-Pierre was also a sprinter.

== Achievements ==
| Year | Competition | Venue | Rank | Event | Time | Notes |
|---|---|---|---|---|---|---|
| 1983 | European Indoor Championships | (Hungary) Budapest | 2nd | 200 m | 21.13 | (Note: He ran a better crono (21.10) in semifinal.) |

== See also ==
- Belgian men's 4 × 400 metres relay team
