= Olivia Borlée =

Belgian sprinter

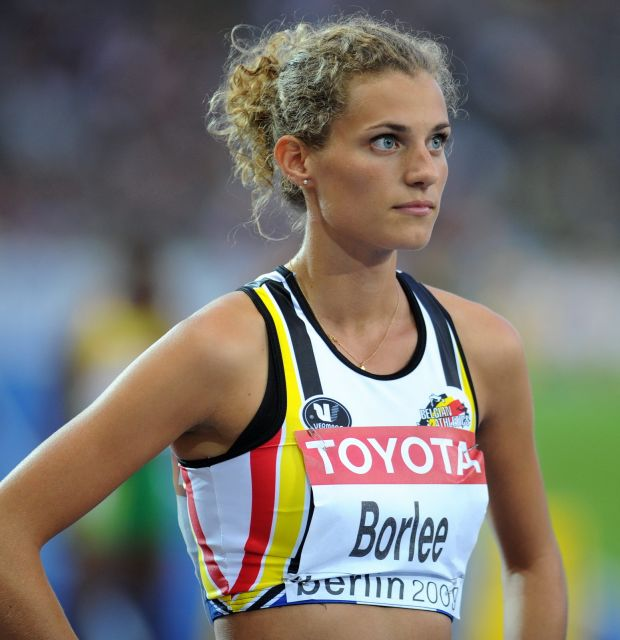
- Olivia Borlée at the 2009 World Championships

Personal information
- National team: Belgium
- Born: 10 April 1986 (age 40) Woluwe-Saint-Lambert, Belgium

Sport
- Sport: Athletics
- Event: 200 metres
- College team: Florida State University

Achievements and titles
- Personal bests: 100 m: 11.39 (2007); 200 m: 22.98 (2006); 400 m: 53.38 (2014)
Medal record
Women's athletics
Representing Belgium
Olympic Games
Gold medal – first place	2008 Beijing	4 × 100 m relay
World Championships
Bronze medal – third place	2007 Osaka	4 × 100 m relay

Olivia Borlée (born 10 April 1986 in Woluwe-Saint-Lambert) is a retired Belgian sprinter who specialized in the 200 metres. Her personal best time in the 200 is 22.98 seconds, achieved in July 2006 in Brussels. She has a personal best of 11.39 seconds in the 100 metres. She won a gold medal in the 4 × 100 m relay at the 2008 Summer Olympics with teammates Hanna Mariën, Élodie Ouédraogo, and Kim Gevaert in a time of 42.54 seconds, which set a new Belgian record.

== Sport career ==
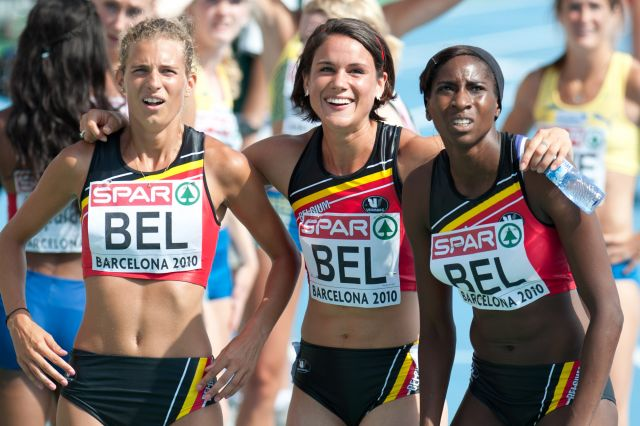
Olivia, first from left at Barcelona 2010.

Borlée represented Belgium at the 2008 Summer Olympics in Beijing. She competed at the 4 × 100 metres relay together with Gevaert, Mariën and Ouédraogo. In their first round heat, they placed first in front of Great Britain, Brazil, and Nigeria. Their time of 42.92 seconds was the third fastest time overall out of sixteen participating nations. With this result, they qualified for the final in which they sprinted to a time of 42.54 seconds and 2nd place behind Russia but in front of Nigeria to take the silver medal, missing out on the gold medal by 0.23 seconds. However, one of the Russian runners, Yuliya Chermoshanskaya, was later found to have used two banned performance-enhancing drugs, resulting in the Russian team's disqualification, thereby promoting Belgium to the gold medal position. Borlée was officially presented with the gold medal eight years later on September 10, 2016.

Borlée represented Belgium at the 2016 Summer Olympics in Rio de Janeiro. She competed in the 200 metres event. She finished 7th in her heat with a time of 23.53 seconds. She did not qualify for the semifinals. She was the flag bearer for Belgium during the Parade of Nations. She retired after the Rio games.

In 2026, the Chemin Olivia Borlée/Olivia Borléeweg in the Heysel neighbourhood of Brussels, Belgium, was named in her honour.

== Fashion career ==
After retiring from professional sport, Borlée and Olympic teammate Elodie Ouedraogo teamed up again to found the sustainable sportswear brand 4254, named after their Olympic medal-winning time. The brand won the Emerging Talent of the Year at the 2018 Belgian Fashion Awards.

== Borlée family ==
The progenitor of the Borlee family is Jacques, bronze medalist at the 1983 European Indoor Championships in Budapest on 200 m, while his first wife Edith Demaertelaere was a good sprinter with a personal best of 23.89. Six of his seven children are athletes (the first five born from the first marriage with Edith, the last two born from a second marriage).

The eldest daughter Olivia won the gold medal at the Olympics and the world bronze at the 2007 Osaka World Championships with the 4 × 100 m relay and the other daughter Alizia was also a decent sprinter. The four sons are all 400 m specialists, the twins Jonathan and Kevin, both Olympic finalists in London 2012, Dylan and the youngest Rayane. In addition, Jacques' older brother Jean-Pierre was also a sprinter.

== Achievements ==
Year	Competition	Venue	Rank	Event	Time	Notes
2007	World Championships	(Japan) Osaka	3rd	4 × 100 m relay	42.75	NR
2008	Olympic Games	(China) Beijing	1st	4 × 100 m relay	42.54	NR
2009	European Team Championships (1st League)	(Norway) Bergen	1st	200 m	23.82	

== See also ==
- Borlée family

Awards
Preceded by Tia Hellebaut	Vlaams Sportjuweel (as the "Women's 4x100 m team" shared with Kim Gevaert, Hanna Mariën, Élodie Ouédraogo); 2007	Succeeded by Kenny De Ketele; Iljo Keisse
Olympic Games
Preceded by Tia Hellebaut	Flagbearer for Belgium; Rio de Janeiro 2016	Succeeded by Nafissatou Thiam & Félix Denayer
