= 2017 European Athletics Indoor Championships – Men's 4 × 400 metres relay =

The men's 4 × 400 metres relay event at the 2017 European Athletics Indoor Championships was held on 5 March at 19:23 local time as a straight final.

== Records ==
Standing records prior to the 2017 European Athletics Indoor Championships
World record	United States (USA)	3:02.13	Sopot, Poland	9 March 2014
European record	Belgium (BEL)	3:02.87	Prague, Czech Republic	8 March 2015
Championship record	Belgium (BEL)	3:02.87	Prague, Czech Republic	8 March 2015
World Leading	United States (USA)	3:02.52	Fayetteville, United States	28 January 2017
European Leading				

== Results ==
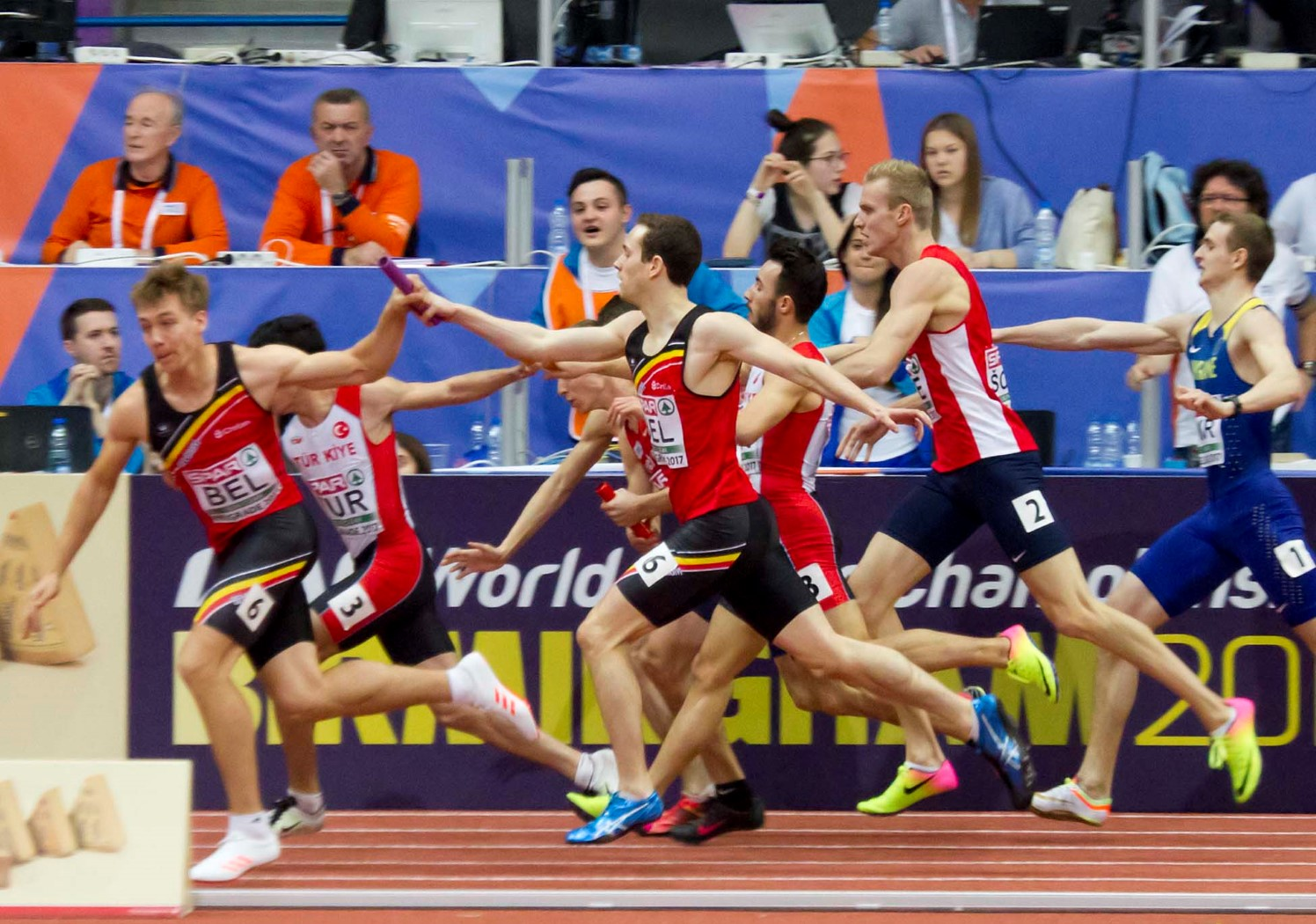
First changeover

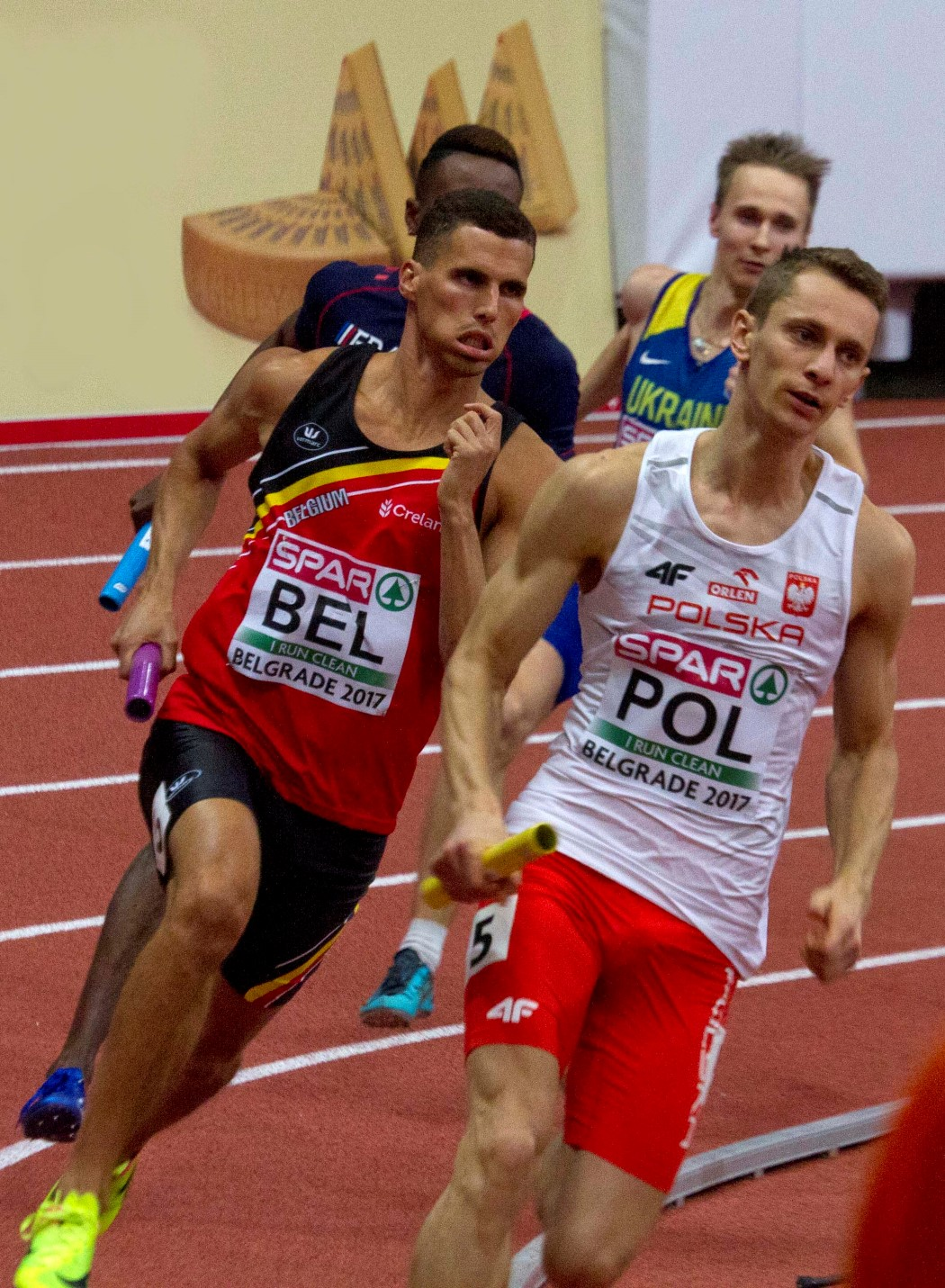
Third leg

Rank	Nationality	Athlete	Time	Notes
1st place, gold medalist(s)	Poland	Kacper Kozłowski; Łukasz Krawczuk; Przemysław Waściński; Rafał Omelko	3:06.99	
2nd place, silver medalist(s)	Belgium	Robin Vanderbemden; Julien Watrin; Kevin Borlée; Dylan Borlée	3:07.80	
3rd place, bronze medalist(s)	Czech Republic	Patrik Šorm; Jan Tesař; Jan Kubista; Pavel Maslák	3:08.60	
4	France	Thomas Jordier; Nicolas Courbiere; Hazir Inoussa; Yoann Décimus	3:08.99	
5	Ukraine	Danylo Danylenko; Yevhen Hutsol; Oleksiy Pozdnyakov; Vitaliy Butrym	3:09.64	
6	Turkey	Batuhan Altıntaş; Mahsum Korkmaz; Akın Özyürek; Mehmet Güzel	3:15.97	
