= Olli Kanervisto =

Finnish shot putter

Personal information
- Born: 23 March 1958 Turku, Finland
- Died: 8 April 1984 (aged 26) Playa del Ingles, Spain

Sport
- Sport: Track and field

Olli Kanervisto, (23 March 1958 in Turku, Finland – 8 April 1984 in Playa del Ingles, Spain) was a Finnish shot putter. He participated the 1983 European Athletics Indoor Championships in Budapest where he finished seventh. His personal best throw was 19,24 metres in 1982.

== Death ==
Kanervisto was killed by an off-duty Spanish police officer in a shooting incident that occurred outside a local night club in Playa del Ingles, Spain. The officer was sentenced to 14 months in prison for a manslaughter of unsound mind.

== Honors ==
- Finnish indoor championship: 1983, 1984
