= Robin Vanderbemden =

Belgian sprinter

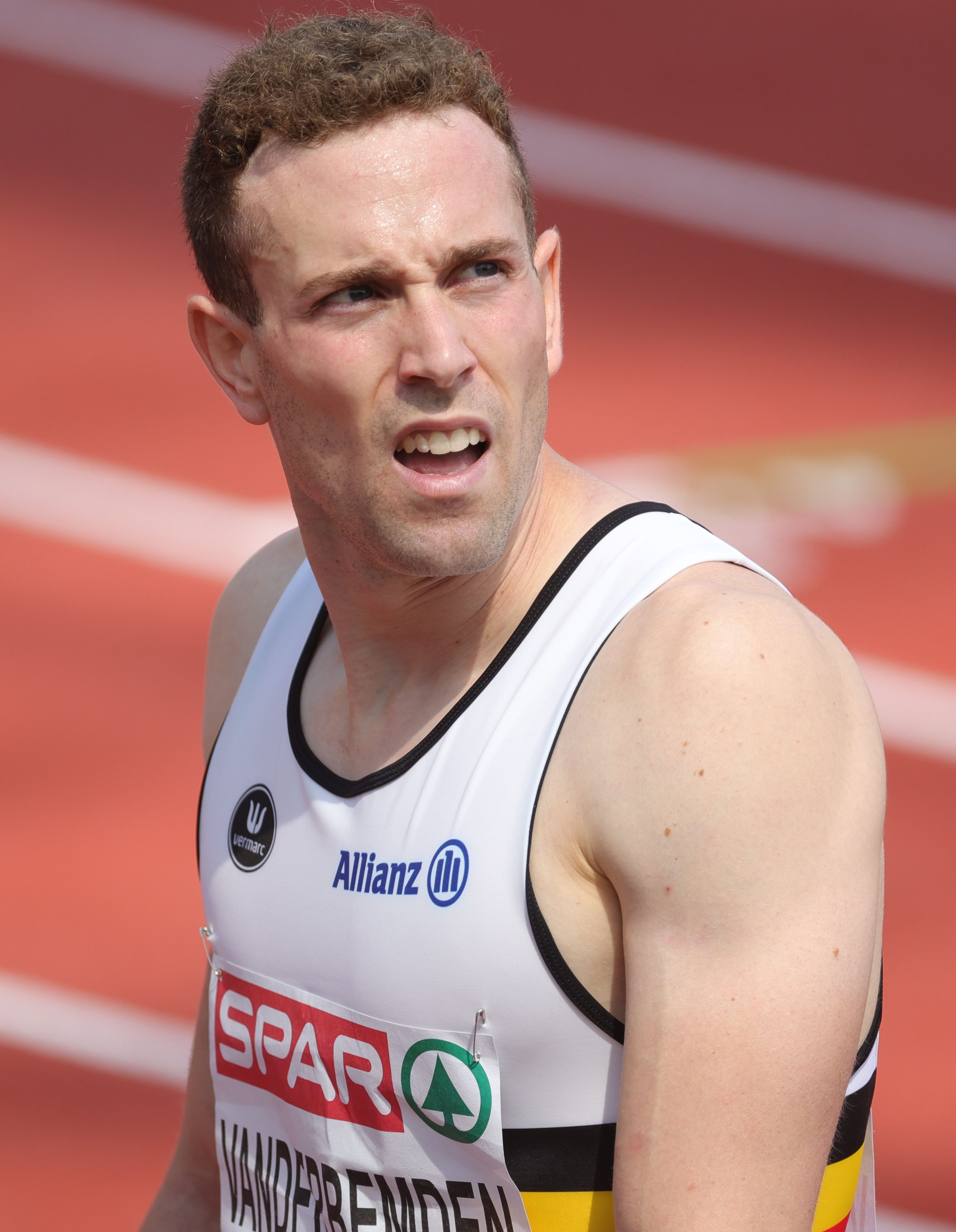
- Robin Vanderbemden in 2022

Personal information
- Nationality: Belgian
- Born: 10 February 1994 (age 32) Seraing, Belgium
- Height: 1.83 m (6 ft 0 in)
- Weight: 74 kg (163 lb)

Sport
- Country: Belgium
- Sport: Athletics
- Event: 200 metres
- Coached by: Bernard Leroy; François Gourmet
Medal record
Representing Belgium
World Championships
| Bronze medal – third place | 2019 Doha | 4 × 400 m relay |
World Relay Championships
| Silver medal – second place | 2025 Guangzhou | 4 × 400 m relay |
| Bronze medal – third place | 2019 Yokohama | 4 × 400 m relay |
| Bronze medal – third place | 2024 Nassau | 4 × 400 m relay |
European Championships
| Gold medal – first place | 2018 Berlin | 4 × 400 m relay |
| Gold medal – first place | 2024 Rome | 4 × 400 m relay |
European Indoor Championships
| Silver medal – second place | 2017 Belgrade | 4 × 400 m relay |

Robin Vanderbemden (born 10 February 1994) is a Belgian sprinter competing primarily in the 200 metres. He also represented his country in the 4 × 400 metres relay winning multiple World and European championship medals with the Belgian men's 4 × 400 metres relay team. He competed at the 2020 Summer Olympics, in 200 m.

== Competition record ==
| Year | Competition | Venue | Position | Event | Notes |
Representing Belgium
| 2011 | European Youth Olympic Festival | Trabzon, Turkey | 10th (h) | 200 m | 21.98 |
| 2013 | European Junior Championships | Rieti, Italy | 8th | 200 m | 21.39 |
| 2013 | Jeux de la Francophonie | Nice, France | 8th | 200 m | 21.68 |
| 2013 | Jeux de la Francophonie | Nice, France | 2nd | 4 × 400 m relay | 3:06.24 |
| 2015 | European U23 Championships | Tallinn, Estonia | 8th | 400 m | 47.20 |
| 2015 | World Championships | Beijing, China | 5th | 4 × 400 m relay | 3:00.24 |
| 2016 | World Indoor Championships | Portland, United States | 5th | 4 × 400 m relay | 3:08.55 |
| 2016 | European Championships | Amsterdam, Netherlands | 16th (h) | 200 m | 21.17 |
| 2016 | European Championships | Amsterdam, Netherlands | 4th (h) | 4 × 400 m relay | 3:03.15 |
| 2017 | European Indoor Championships | Belgrade, Serbia | 2nd | 4 × 400 m relay | 3:07.80 |
| 2017 | World Championships | London, United Kingdom | 4th | 4 × 400 m relay | 3:00.04 |
| 2018 | European Championships | Berlin, Germany | 14th (sf) | 200 m | 20.62 |
| 2018 | European Championships | Berlin, Germany | 4th (h) | 4 × 400 m relay | 3:02.55 |
| 2019 | World Relays | Yokohama, Japan | 3rd | 4 × 400 m relay | 3:02.70 |
| 2019 | World Championships | Doha, Qatar | 3rd | 4 × 400 m relay | 2.58.78 |
| 2021 | World Relays | Chorzów, Poland | 8th | 4 × 400 m relay | 3:10.74 |
| 2021 | Olympic Games | Tokyo, Japan | 23rd (sf) | 200 m | 21.00 |
| 2022 | European Championships | Munich, Germany | 15th (h) | 200 m | 20.90 |
| 2022 | European Championships | Munich, Germany | 6th | 4 × 100 m relay | 39.01 |
| 2023 | World Championships | Budapest, Hungary | 9th (h) | 4 × 400 m relay | 3:00.33 |
| 2024 | World Relays | Nassau, Bahamas | 3rd | 4 × 400 m | 3:01.16 |
| 2024 | European Championships | Rome, Italy | 1st | 4 × 400 m | 2:59.84 EL |
| 2025 | World Relays | Guangzhou, China | 2nd | 4 × 400 m | 2:58.19 SB |
| 2025 | World Championships | Tokyo, Japan | 4th | 4 × 400 m | 2:59.48 |
| 2026 | World Indoor Championships | Toruń, Poland | 2nd | 4 × 400 m relay | 3:03.29 |

== Personal bests ==
Outdoor

- 200 metres – 20.43 (−0.3 m/s, Ninove 2018)
- 400 metres – 45.51 (Brussels 2023)

Indoor

- 60 metres – 6.68 (Ghent 2014)

== See also ==
- Belgian men's 4 × 400 metres relay team
