= 1983 European Athletics Indoor Championships =

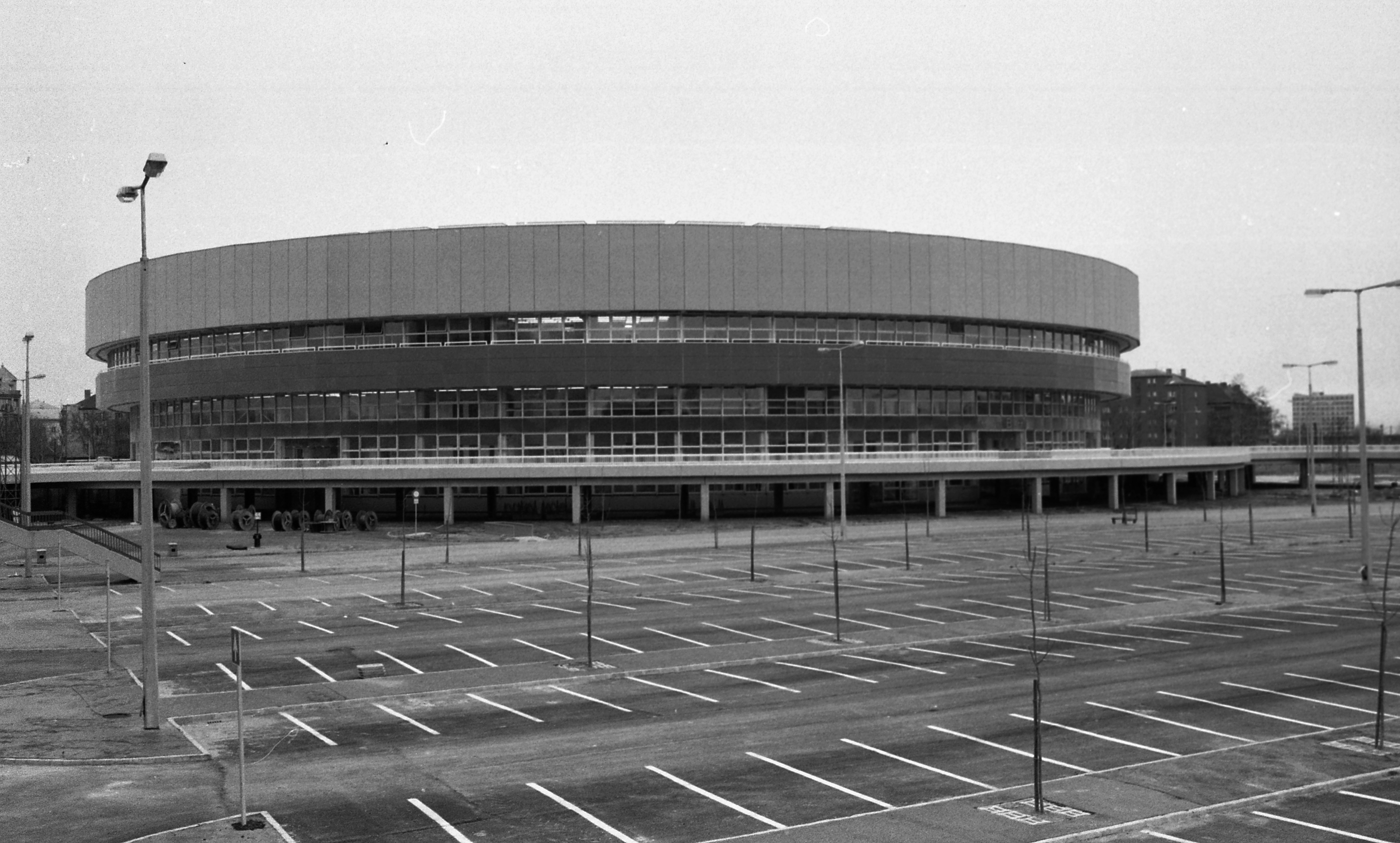
- Dates: 5–6 March 1983
- Host city: Budapest; Hungary
- Venue: Budapest Sportcsarnok
- Events: 23
- Participation: 261 athletes from 24 nations

The 1983 European Athletics Indoor Championships were held at Sportcsarnok in Budapest, the capital city of Hungary, on 5 and 6 March 1983.

Sportcsarnok, also known as Budapest Sports Arena, served as the venue for this prestigious event. Athletes from various European countries participated in the championships, competing in a range of indoor track and field disciplines. The event provided an opportunity for athletes to showcase their skills and compete for titles and medals in front of an enthusiastic audience.

== Medal summary ==
=== Men ===
Event	Gold		Silver		Bronze	
60 metres	Stefano Tilli (ITA)	6.63	Christian Haas (FRG)	6.64	Valentin Atanasov (BUL)	6.66
200 metres	Aleksandr Yevgenyev (URS)	20.97 CR	Jacques Borlée (BEL)	21.13	István Nagy (HUN)	21.18
400 metres	Yevgeniy Lomtev (URS)	46.20 CR	Ainsley Bennett (GBR)	46.43	Ángel Heras (ESP)	46.57
800 metres	Colomán Trabado (ESP)	1:46.91	Peter Elliott (GBR)	1:47.58	Thierry Tonnelier (FRA)	1:47.68
1500 metres	Thomas Wessinghage (FRG)	3:39.82	José Manuel Abascal (ESP)	3:40.69	Antti Loikkanen (FIN)	3:41.31
3000 metres	Dragan Zdravković (YUG)	7:54.73	Valeriy Abramov (URS)	7:57.79	Uwe Mönkemeyer (FRG)	7:58.11
60 metres hurdles	Thomas Munkelt (GDR)	7.48 CR	Arto Bryggare (FIN)	7.60 NR	Andreas Oschkenat (GDR)	7.63
5000 metres walk	Anatoliy Solomin (URS)	19:19.93	Yevgeniy Yevsyukov (URS)	19:41.66	Erling Andersen (NOR)	20:00.68
High jump	Carlo Thränhardt (FRG)	2.32	Gerd Nagel (FRG)	2.30	Massimo Di Giorgio (ITA); Mirosław Włodarczyk (POL)	2.27
Pole vault	Vladimir Polyakov (URS)	5.60	Aleksandrs Obižajevs (URS)	5.60	Patrick Abada (FRA)	5.55
Long jump	László Szalma (HUN)	7.95	Gyula Pálóczi (HUN)	7.90	Jens Knipphals (FRG)	7.82
Triple jump	Nikolay Musiyenko (URS)	17.12	Gennadiy Valyukevich (URS)	16.94	Béla Bakosi (HUN)	16.90
Shot put	Jānis Bojārs (URS)	20.56	Aleksandr Baryshnikov (URS)	20.44	Ivan Ivančić (YUG)	20.26

=== Women ===
Event	Gold		Silver		Bronze	
60 metres	Marlies Göhr (GDR)	7.09 CR	Silke Gladisch (GDR)	7.12	Marisa Masullo (ITA)	7.19
200 metres	Marita Koch (GDR)	22.39 CR	Joan Baptiste (GBR)	23.37	Christina Sussiek (FRG)	23.61
400 metres	Jarmila Kratochvílová (TCH)	49.69	Kirsten Siemon (GDR)	51.70	Rositsa Stamenova (BUL)	52.36
800 metres	Svetlana Kitova (URS)	2:01.28	Zuzana Moravčíková (TCH)	2:01.66	Olga Simakova (URS)	2:02.25
1500 metres	Brigitte Kraus (FRG)	4:16.14	Maria Radu (ROM)	4:17.16	Ivana Kleinová (TCH)	4:17.21
3000 metres	Yelena Sipatova (URS)	9:04.40	Agnese Possamai (ITA)	9:04.41	Yelena Malykhina (URS)	9:04.52
60 metres hurdles	Bettine Jahn (GDR)	7.75 WR	Kerstin Knabe (GDR)	7.96	Tatyana Malyuvanyets (URS)	8.07
High jump	Tamara Bykova (URS)	2.03 CR	Larisa Kositsyna (URS)	1.94	Maryse Ewanjé-Epée (FRA)	1.92
Long jump	Eva Murková (TCH)	6.77 =CR	Helga Radtke (GDR)	6.63	Heike Daute (GDR)	6.61
Shot put	Helena Fibingerová (TCH)	20.61	Helma Knorscheidt (GDR)	20.35	Zdenka Šilhavá (TCH)	19.56

== Medal table ==
Rank	Nation	Gold	Silver	Bronze	Total
1	Soviet Union (URS)	9	6	3	18
2	East Germany (GDR)	4	5	2	11
3	West Germany (FRG)	3	2	3	8
4	Czechoslovakia (TCH)	3	1	2	6
5	Hungary (HUN)	1	1	2	4
5	Italy (ITA)	1	1	2	4
7	Spain (ESP)	1	1	1	3
8	Yugoslavia (YUG)	1	0	1	2
9	Great Britain (GBR)	0	3	0	3
10	Finland (FIN)	0	1	1	2
11	Belgium (BEL)	0	1	0	1
11	Romania (ROU)	0	1	0	1
13	France (FRA)	0	0	3	3
14	Bulgaria (BUL)	0	0	2	2
15	Norway (NOR)	0	0	1	1
15	Poland (POL)	0	0	1	1
Totals (16 entries)		23	23	24	70

== Participating nations ==
- Austria (8)
- Belgium (4)
- Bulgaria (12)
- Czechoslovakia (18)
- East Germany (15)
- Finland (7)
- France (20)
- Great Britain (13)
- Greece (3)
- Hungary (31)
- Ireland (2)
- Italy (16)
- Netherlands (3)
- Norway (1)
- Poland (10)
- Portugal (1)
- Romania (6)
- Soviet Union (33)
- Spain (10)
- Sweden (10)
- Switzerland (5)
- Turkey (3)
- West Germany (25)
- Yugoslavia (5)

== See also ==
- 1983 in athletics (track and field)
