= Athletics at the 2011 Pan American Games – Men's 400 metres =

Men's 400 metres at the 2011 Pan American Games
- Venue: Telmex Athletics Stadium
- Dates: October 25–26. 2011
- Competitors: 23 from 18 nations

Medalists
Gold medal	Nery Brenes	Costa Rica
Silver medal	Luguelín Santos	Dominican Republic
Bronze medal	Ramon Miller	Bahamas

The men's 400 metres sprint competition of the athletics events at the 2011 Pan American Games will take place between October 25 and 26, 2011 at the Telmex Athletics Stadium. The defending Pan American Games champion is Chris Brown of the Bahamas.

== Records ==
Prior to this competition, the existing world and Pan American Games records were as follows:

World record	Michael Johnson (USA)	43.18	Seville, Spain	August 26, 1999
Pan American Games record	Roberto Hernández (CUB)	44.52	Havana, Cuba	1991

== Qualification ==
Each National Olympic Committee (NOC) was able to enter up to two entrants providing they had met the minimum standard (46.25) in the qualifying period (January 1, 2010 to September 14, 2011).

== Schedule ==
Date	Time	Round
October 25, 2011	16:45	Semifinals
October 26, 2011	18:00	Final

== Results ==
All times shown are in seconds.

KEY:	q	Fastest non-qualifiers	Q	Qualified	NR	National record	PB	Personal best	SB	Seasonal best

=== Semifinals ===
The semifinals were held on October 25. The first two in each heat (Q) and the next two fastest (q) qualified for the semifinals.

Rank	Heat	Name	Nationality	Time	Notes
1	2	Ramon Miller	Bahamas	45.40	Q
2	2	Luguelín Santos	Dominican Republic	45.41	Q, PB
3	2	Nery Brenes	Costa Rica	45.42	q
4	1	William Collazo	Cuba	45.70	Q
5	1	Anderson Henriques	Brazil	45.71	Q, PB
6	3	Chris Brown	Bahamas	45.92	Q
7	1	Arismendy Peguero	Dominican Republic	45.94	q
8	3	Noel Ruíz	Cuba	45.98	Q
9	3	Michael Mason	Jamaica	46.09	
9	3	Joshua Scott	United States	46.09	
11	1	Erison Hurtault	Dominica	46.24	
12	1	Alberto Aguilar	Venezuela	46.39	
13	3	Omar Longart	Venezuela	46.50	
14	3	Takeshi Fujiwara	El Salvador	46.92	
15	2	Winston George	Guyana	46.93	
16	2	Geiner Mosquera	Colombia	46.97	SB
17	1	Orlando Garcia	Mexico	47.45	
18	3	Augusto Stanley	Paraguay	47.52	
19	2	Annert Whyte	Jamaica	47.57	
20	2	Tremaine Harris	Canada	48.21	
21	1	Richard Richardson	Antigua and Barbuda	48.49	
22	2	Jayson Jones	Belize	51.60	
23	1	Keron Toussaint	Grenada	1:37.36	

=== Final ===
The final was held on October 26.

Rank	Name	Nationality	Time	Notes
1st place, gold medalist(s)	Nery Brenes	Costa Rica	44.65	PB
2nd place, silver medalist(s)	Luguelín Santos	Dominican Republic	44.71	PB
3rd place, bronze medalist(s)	Ramon Miller	Bahamas	45.01	SB
4	William Collazo	Cuba	45.33	
5	Noel Ruíz	Cuba	45.69	
6	Arismendy Peguero	Dominican Republic	45.72	
7	Chris Brown	Bahamas	45.89	
8	Anderson Henriques	Brazil	45.92	
