= 2008 IAAF World Indoor Championships – Men's 400 metres =

== Medalists ==
Gold
| Tyler Christopher | Canada |
Silver
| Johan Wissman | Sweden |
Bronze
| Chris Brown | Bahamas |

== Heats ==
| Heat | Lane | Name | Country | Mark | Q | React |
|---|---|---|---|---|---|---|
| 1 | 6 | Sean Wroe | Australia | 47.23 PB | Q | 0.239 |
| 1 | 5 | Richard Buck | United Kingdom | 47.54 | Q | |
| 1 | 4 | Greg Nixon | United States | 47.64 | | 0.165 |
| 1 | 2 | Mark Ujakpor | Spain | 47.94 | | 0.139 |
| 1 | 3 | Yoann Décimus | France | DNS | | |
| 2 | 4 | Nery Brenes | Costa Rica | 46.45 NR | Q | 0.181 |
| 2 | 6 | Chris Lloyd | Dominica | 46.79 | Q | 0.251 |
| 2 | 3 | Denis Alekseyev | Russia | 47.07 | q | 0.231 |
| 2 | 5 | Steven Green | United Kingdom | 47.44 | | 0.171 |
| 2 | 2 | Arismendy Peguero | Dominican Republic | 47.45 | | 0.277 |
| 3 | 6 | Tyler Christopher | Canada | 47.06 | Q | 0.253 |
| 3 | 2 | California Molefe | Botswana | 47.22 | Q | 0.214 |
| 3 | 5 | Michael Mathieu | Bahamas | 47.34 | | 0.167 |
| 3 | 3 | Clemens Zeller | Austria | 47.34 | | 0.260 |
| 3 | 4 | Nelton Ndebele | Zimbabwe | DNS | | |
| 4 | 5 | Maksim Dyldin | Russia | 46.96 | Q | 0.161 |
| 4 | 6 | David Neville | United States | 47.43 | Q | 0.227 |
| 4 | 3 | Edino Steele | Jamaica | 47.51 | | 0.261 |
| 4 | 4 | Andrés Silva | Uruguay | 47.54 SB | | 0.250 |
| 4 | 1 | Carlos Santa | Dominican Republic | 48.10 | | 0.226 |
| 4 | 2 | Dalibor Spasovski | Macedonia | DNF | | |
| 5 | 5 | Johan Wissman | Sweden | 46.12 PB | Q | 0.211 |
| 5 | 6 | Chris Brown | Bahamas | 46.47 | Q | 0.260 |
| 5 | 4 | DeWayne Barrett | Jamaica | 47.02 | q | 0.258 |
| 5 | 1 | Mamoudou Hanne | Mali | 48.44 | | 0.181 |
| 5 | 3 | Alleyne Francique | Grenada | 48.64 | | 0.248 |
| 5 | 2 | Takeshi Fujiwara | El Salvador | 48.82 NR | | 0.195 |

== Semifinals ==
| Heat | Lane | Name | Country | Mark | Q | React |
|---|---|---|---|---|---|---|
| 1 | 5 | Tyler Christopher | Canada | 46.57 | Q | 0.253 |
| 1 | 6 | Johan Wissman | Sweden | 46.86 | Q | 0.242 |
| 1 | 3 | Sean Wroe | Australia | 47.13 PB | Q | 0.257 |
| 1 | 2 | Denis Alekseyev | Russia | 47.18 | | 0.292 |
| 1 | 4 | California Molefe | Botswana | 47.74 | | 0.342 |
| 1 | 1 | David Neville | United States | 48.18 | | 0.294 |
| 2 | 4 | Chris Brown | Bahamas | 46.68 | Q | 0.254 |
| 2 | 5 | Nery Brenes | Costa Rica | 46.85 | Q | 0.298 |
| 2 | 6 | Maksim Dyldin | Russia | 46.92 | Q | 0.257 |
| 2 | 3 | Chris Lloyd | Dominica | 46.92 | | 0.189 |
| 2 | 2 | Richard Buck | United Kingdom | 47.60 | | 0.232 |
| 2 | 1 | DeWayne Barrett | Jamaica | 48.41 | | 0.242 |

== Final ==
| Heat | Lane | Name | Country | Mark | React |
|---|---|---|---|---|---|
| Gold medal | 5 | Tyler Christopher | Canada | 45.67 WL | 0.241 |
| Silver medal | 4 | Johan Wissman | Sweden | 46.04 PB | 0.224 |
| Bronze medal | 6 | Chris Brown | Bahamas | 46.26 SB | 0.263 |
| 4 | 3 | Nery Brenes | Costa Rica | 46.65 | 0.251 |
| 5 | 1 | Maksim Dyldin | Russia | 46.79 | 0.248 |
| 6 | 2 | Sean Wroe | Australia | 46.93 PB | 0.270 |
