= 2009 European Athletics Indoor Championships – Men's 400 metres =

Athletic indoor championship

The Men's 400 metres event at the 2009 European Athletics Indoor Championships was held on March 6–7.

== Medalists ==
Gold	Silver	Bronze
Johan Wissman; Sweden	Claudio Licciardello; Italy	Ioan Vieru; Romania

== Results ==
=== Heats ===
First 2 of each heat (Q) and the next 2 fastest (q) qualified for the semifinals.

Rank	Heat	Name	Nationality	Time	Notes
1	1	Johan Wissman	Sweden	46.49	Q
2	1	Clemens Zeller	Austria	46.61	Q
3	5	Jan Ciepiela	Poland	46.72	Q, PB
4	5	Claudio Licciardello	Italy	46.72	Q
5	3	Ioan Vieru	Romania	46.99	Q
6	3	Richard Buck	Great Britain	47.04	Q
7	4	David Gillick	Ireland	47.10	Q
8	2	Matteo Galvan	Italy	47.18	Q
9	2	Nick Leavey	Great Britain	47.19	Q
10	2	Yoan Décimus	France	47.22	q
11	1	Piotr Klimczak	Poland	47.24	q
12	3	Stanislav Melnykov	Ukraine	47.24	
13	4	Yannick Fonsat	France	47.28	Q
14	5	Vladimir Krasnov	Russia	47.31	
15	2	Santiago Ezquerro	Spain	47.45	
16	5	Jussi Heikkilä	Finland	47.53	SB
17	4	Jacob Riis	Denmark	47.54	PB
18	3	Mark Ujakpor	Spain	47.59	
19	1	Visa Hongisto	Finland	47.70	NJR
20	3	Peter Žnava	Slovakia	47.85	
21	5	Serdar Tamaç	Turkey	47.94	
22	1	Andreas Bube	Denmark	48.02	
23	4	Petr Szetei	Czech Republic	48.03	
24	2	Ali Ekber Kayas	Turkey	48.65	
25	1	Catalin Cîmpeanu	Romania	48.66	
26	2	Nicklas Hyde	Denmark	49.30	
	4	Antonio Manuel Reina	Spain	DNF	

=== Semifinals ===
First 3 of each semifinals qualified directly (Q) for the final.

Rank	Heat	Name	Nationality	Time	Notes
1	2	Claudio Licciardello	Italy	46.31	Q
2	1	Johan Wissman	Sweden	46.38	Q
3	1	Ioan Vieru	Romania	46.61	Q
4	1	Richard Buck	Great Britain	46.76	Q
5	2	Clemens Zeller	Austria	46.84	Q
6	2	Matteo Galvan	Italy	47.45	Q
7	2	Jan Ciepiela	Poland	47.54	
8	2	Yoan Décimus	France	47.78	
9	1	Nick Leavey	Great Britain	47.93	
10	2	Yannick Fonsat	France	47.99	
11	1	Piotr Klimczak	Poland	53.81	
12	1	David Gillick	Ireland	1:37.01	

=== Final ===
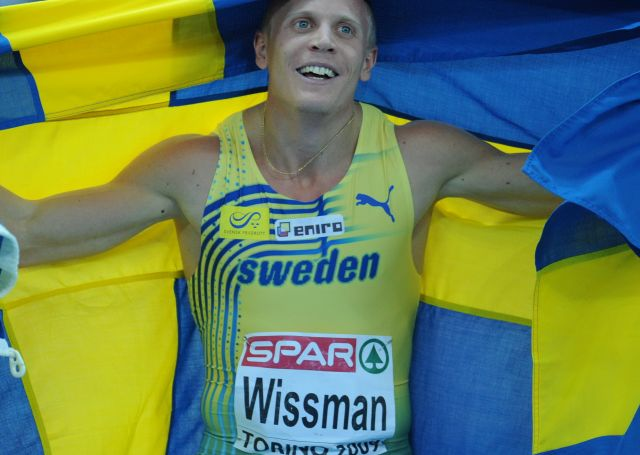
Johan Wissman of Sweden won the gold medal.

Rank	Name	Nationality	Time	Notes
1st place, gold medalist(s)	Johan Wissman	Sweden	45.89	PB
2nd place, silver medalist(s)	Claudio Licciardello	Italy	46.32	
3rd place, bronze medalist(s)	Ioan Vieru	Romania	46.54	SB
4	Clemens Zeller	Austria	46.62	
5	Richard Buck	Great Britain	46.94	
6	Matteo Galvan	Italy	48.23	
