= 2010 European Athletics Championships – Men's 400 metres =

Men's 400 metres at the European Athletics Championships

The men's 400 metres at the 2010 European Athletics Championships was held at the Estadi Olímpic Lluís Companys on 27, 28 and 30 July.

== Medalists ==
Gold	Kevin Borlée; Belgium (BEL)
Silver	(United Kingdom) Michael Bingham; Great Britain (GBR)
Bronze	(United Kingdom) Martyn Rooney; Great Britain (GBR)

== Records ==
Standing records prior to the 2010 European Athletics Championships
World record	Michael Johnson (USA)	43.18	Seville, Spain	26 August 1999
European record	Thomas Schönlebe (GDR)	44.33	Rome, Italy	3 September 1987
Championship record	Iwan Thomas (GBR)	44.52	Budapest, Hungary	21 August 1998
World Leading	Jermaine Gonzales (JAM)	44.40	Monaco	22 July 2010
European Leading	Jonathan Borlée (BEL)	44.77	Saint-Denis, France	16 July 2010

== Schedule ==
Date	Time	Round
27 July 2010	11:00	Round 1
28 July 2010	19:00	Semifinals
30 July 2010	21:25	Final

== Results ==
=== Round 1 ===
First 4 in each heat (Q) and 4 best performers (q) advanced to the Semifinals.

==== Heat 1 ====
Rank	Lane	Name	Nationality	React	Time	Notes
1	5	Kevin Borlée	Belgium	0.185	45.71	Q
2	8	Martyn Rooney	Great Britain & N.I.	0.210	45.72	Q
3	6	Andrea Barberi	Italy	0.179	46.05	Q, SB
4	4	Catalin Cîmpeanu	Romania	0.295	46.17	Q, PB
5	7	Maksim Dyldin	Russia	0.249	46.21	q
6	3	Gordon Kennedy	Ireland	0.233	46.63	q
7	2	Ivano Bucci	San Marino	0.224	49.03	

==== Heat 2 ====
Rank	Lane	Name	Nationality	React	Time	Notes
1	4	Jonathan Borlée	Belgium	0.193	45.91	Q
2	6	Yannick Fonsat	France	0.236	46.26	Q
3	8	Marcin Marciniszyn	Poland	0.282	46.31	Q
4	7	Dimítrios Grávalos	Greece	0.195	46.56	Q
5	2	Sebastjan Jagarinec	Slovenia	0.268	46.75	q
6	3	Mark Ujakpor	Spain	0.189	46.85	SB
7	5	Myhaylo Knysh	Ukraine	0.268	46.86	

==== Heat 3 ====
Rank	Lane	Name	Nationality	React	Time	Notes
1	3	David Gillick	Ireland	0.189	45.84	Q
2	2	Dmytro Ostrovskyy	Ukraine	0.204	45.98	Q
3	6	Arnaud Destatte	Belgium	0.197	46.42	Q
4	8	Marc Orozco	Spain	0.177	47.19	Q
5	4	Nicklas Hyde	Denmark	0.224	48.65	
–	7	Clemens Zeller	Austria	0.213	DNF	
–	5	Peter Znava	Slovakia	0.213	DNF	

==== Heat 4 ====
Rank	Lane	Name	Nationality	React	Time	Notes
1	3	Vladimir Krasnov	Russia	0.284	46.07	Q
2	5	Teddy Venel	France	0.196	46.18	Q
3	7	Conrad Williams	Great Britain & N.I.	0.257	46.35	Q
4	2	Piotr Klimczak	Poland	0.244	46.81	Q
5	6	Brian Gregan	Ireland	0.225	46.90	
6	4	Máté Lukács	Hungary	0.200	47.74	

==== Heat 5 ====
Rank	Lane	Name	Nationality	React	Time	Notes
1	4	Michael Bingham	Great Britain & N.I.	0.205	45.49	Q
2	6	Leslie Djhone	France	0.197	45.79	Q
3	3	Kacper Kozłowski	Poland	0.192	45.97	Q
4	5	Marco Vistalli	Italy	0.266	46.06	Q
5	7	Pétros Kiriakídis	Greece	0.236	46.65	q, SB
6	2	Volodymyr Burakov	Ukraine	0.278	47.03	

==== Summary ====
Rank	Heat	Lane	Name	Nationality	React	Time	Note
1	5	4	Michael Bingham	Great Britain & N.I.	0.205	45.49	Q
2	1	5	Kevin Borlée	Belgium	0.185	45.71	Q
3	1	8	Martyn Rooney	Great Britain & N.I.	0.210	45.72	Q
4	5	6	Leslie Djhone	France	0.197	45.79	Q
5	3	3	David Gillick	Ireland	0.189	45.84	Q
6	2	4	Jonathan Borlée	Belgium	0.193	45.91	Q
7	5	3	Kacper Kozłowski	Poland	0.192	45.97	Q
8	3	2	Dmytro Ostrovskyy	Ukraine	0.204	45.98	Q
9	1	6	Andrea Barberi	Italy	0.179	46.05	Q, SB
10	5	5	Marco Vistalli	Italy	0.266	46.06	Q
11	4	3	Vladimir Krasnov	Russia	0.284	46.07	Q
12	1	4	Catalin Cîmpeanu	Romania	0.295	46.17	Q, PB
13	4	5	Teddy Venel	France	0.196	46.18	Q
14	1	7	Maksim Dyldin	Russia	0.249	46.21	q
15	2	6	Yannick Fonsat	France	0.236	46.26	Q
16	2	8	Marcin Marciniszyn	Poland	0.282	46.31	Q
17	4	7	Conrad Williams	Great Britain & N.I.	0.257	46.35	Q
18	3	6	Arnaud Destatte	Belgium	0.197	46.42	Q
19	2	7	Dimítrios Grávalos	Greece	0.195	46.56	Q
20	1	3	Gordon Kennedy	Ireland	0.233	46.63	q
21	5	7	Pétros Kiriakídis	Greece	0.236	46.65	q, SB
22	2	2	Sebastjan Jagarinec	Slovenia	0.268	46.75	q
23	4	2	Piotr Klimczak	Poland	0.244	46.81	Q
24	2	3	Mark Ujakpor	Spain	0.189	46.85	SB
25	2	5	Myhaylo Knysh	Ukraine	0.268	46.86	
26	4	6	Brian Gregan	Ireland	0.225	46.90	
27	5	2	Volodymyr Burakov	Ukraine	0.278	47.03	
28	3	8	Marc Orozco	Spain	0.177	47.19	Q
29	4	4	Máté Lukács	Hungary	0.200	47.74	
30	3	4	Nicklas Hyde	Denmark	0.224	48.65	
31	1	2	Ivano Bucci	San Marino	0.224	49.03	
	3	7	Clemens Zeller	Austria	0.213	DNF	
	3	5	Peter Znava	Slovakia	0.213	DNF	

=== Semifinals ===
First 2 in each heat and 2 best performers advance to the Final.

==== Semifinal 1 ====
Rank	Lane	Name	Nationality	React	Time	Notes
1	4	Jonathan Borlée	Belgium	0.193	44.71	Q, NR, EL
2	5	Leslie Djhone	France	0.183	44.87	Q, SB
3	6	Martyn Rooney	Great Britain & N.I.	0.208	45.00	q
4	7	Marcin Marciniszyn	Poland	0.211	45.58	SB
5	3	Andrea Barberi	Italy	0.186	45.63	SB
6	2	Sebastjan Jagarinec	Slovenia	0.248	46.13	PB
7	8	Dimítrios Grávalos	Greece	0.227	46.30	SB
8	1	Marc Orozco	Spain	0.183	46.96	

==== Semifinal 2 ====
Rank	Lane	Name	Nationality	React	Time	Notes
1	6	David Gillick	Ireland	0.179	44.79	Q, SB
2	4	Michael Bingham	Great Britain & N.I.	0.216	44.88	Q, SB
3	3	Kacper Kozłowski	Poland	0.174	45.24	q, PB
4	8	Marco Vistalli	Italy	0.213	45.38	PB
5	5	Teddy Venel	France	0.248	45.55	SB
6	2	Maksim Dyldin	Russia	0.201	45.66	SB
7	7	Arnaud Destatte	Belgium	0.187	46.38	
8	1	Pétros Kiriakídis	Greece	0.201	46.90	

==== Semifinal 3 ====
Rank	Lane	Name	Nationality	React	Time	Notes
1	4	Kevin Borlée	Belgium	0.220	45.32	Q
2	5	Vladimir Krasnov	Russia	0.316	45.64	Q
3	6	Dmytro Ostrovskyy	Ukraine	0.179	45.81	
4	3	Yannick Fonsat	France	0.195	46.03	
5	7	Catalin Cîmpeanu	Romania	0.254	46.43	
6	8	Conrad Williams	Great Britain & N.I.	0.293	46.60	
7	2	Piotr Klimczak	Poland	0.237	46.68	
8	1	Gordon Kennedy	Ireland	0.197	46.72	

==== Summary ====
Rank	Heat	Lane	Name	Nationality	React	Time	Notes
1	1	4	Jonathan Borlée	Belgium	0.193	44.71	Q, NR, EL
2	2	6	David Gillick	Ireland	0.179	44.79	Q, SB
3	1	5	Leslie Djhone	France	0.183	44.87	Q, SB
4	2	4	Michael Bingham	Great Britain & N.I.	0.216	44.88	Q, SB
5	1	6	Martyn Rooney	Great Britain & N.I.	0.208	45.00	q
6	2	3	Kacper Kozłowski	Poland	0.174	45.24	q, PB
7	3	4	Kevin Borlée	Belgium	0.220	45.32	Q
8	2	8	Marco Vistalli	Italy	0.213	45.38	PB
9	2	5	Teddy Venel	France	0.248	45.55	SB
10	1	7	Marcin Marciniszyn	Poland	0.211	45.58	SB
11	1	3	Andrea Barberi	Italy	0.186	45.63	SB
12	3	5	Vladimir Krasnov	Russia	0.316	45.64	Q
13	2	2	Maksim Dyldin	Russia	0.201	45.66	SB
14	3	6	Dmytro Ostrovskyy	Ukraine	0.179	45.81	
15	3	3	Yannick Fonsat	France	0.195	46.03	
16	1	2	Sebastjan Jagarinec	Slovenia	0.248	46.13	PB
17	1	8	Dimítrios Grávalos	Greece	0.227	46.30	SB
18	2	7	Arnaud Destatte	Belgium	0.187	46.38	
19	3	7	Catalin Cîmpeanu	Romania	0.254	46.43	
20	3	8	Conrad Williams	Great Britain & N.I.	0.293	46.60	
21	3	2	Piotr Klimczak	Poland	0.237	46.68	
22	3	1	Gordon Kennedy	Ireland	0.197	46.72	
23	2	1	Pétros Kiriakídis	Greece	0.201	46.90	
24	1	1	Marc Orozco	Spain	0.183	46.96	

=== Final ===
Rank	Lane	Name	Nationality	React	Time	Notes
1st place, gold medalist(s)	6	Kevin Borlée	Belgium	0.161	45.08	SB
2nd place, silver medalist(s)	8	Michael Bingham	Great Britain & N.I.	0.198	45.23	
3rd place, bronze medalist(s)	1	Martyn Rooney	Great Britain & N.I.	0.187	45.23	
4	7	Vladimir Krasnov	Russia	0.372	45.24	
5	4	David Gillick	Ireland	0.192	45.28	
6	5	Leslie Djhone	France	0.187	45.30	
7	3	Jonathan Borlée	Belgium	0.195	45.35	
8	2	Kacper Kozłowski	Poland	0.180	46.07	
