= 2007 European Athletics Indoor Championships – Men's 400 metres =

The Men's 400 metres event at the 2007 European Athletics Indoor Championships was held on 2–3 March.

== Medalists ==
Gold	Silver	Bronze
David Gillick; Ireland	Bastian Swillims; Germany	Robert Tobin; Great Britain

== Results ==
=== Heats ===
First 2 of each heat (Q) and the next 4 fastest (q) qualified for the semifinals.

Rank	Heat	Name	Nationality	Time	Notes
1	4	Bastian Swillims	Germany	46.08	Q
2	2	David Gillick	Ireland	46.70	Q
3	1	Robert Tobin	Great Britain	46.77	Q
4	4	Andrea Barberi	Italy	46.85	Q
5	2	Clemens Zeller	Austria	46.87	Q
6	3	Johan Wissman	Sweden	46.92	Q
7	2	Catalin Cîmpeanu	Romania	47.05	q, PB
8	3	David Testa	Spain	47.07	Q
9	3	Steven Green	Great Britain	47.08	q, PB
10	3	Ivan Buzolin	Russia	47.12	q
11	4	Željko Vincek	Croatia	47.41	q
12	1	Jirí Vojtík	Czech Republic	47.45	Q
13	2	Dale Garland	Great Britain	47.51	
14	1	Dmitriy Forshev	Russia	47.58	
15	1	Santiago Ezquerro	Spain	47.61	
16	4	Myhaylo Knysh	Ukraine	47.65	
17	1	Valentin Bulychov	Azerbaijan	47.73	PB
18	2	Jacob Riis	Denmark	47.76	SB
19	3	Bogdan Vîlcu	Romania	48.48	SB
20	3	Sveinn Elías Elíasson	Iceland	49.15	
21	1	Dalibor Spasovski	Macedonia	49.97	PB
21	4	Jonathon Lavers	Gibraltar	50.18	NR
	4	Vasile Bobos	Romania	DQ	

=== Semifinals ===
First 3 of each semifinals qualified directly (Q) for the final.

Rank	Heat	Name	Nationality	Time	Notes
1	1	Bastian Swillims	Germany	45.92	Q
2	2	David Gillick	Ireland	46.16	Q
3	2	Robert Tobin	Great Britain	46.19	Q
4	1	Johan Wissman	Sweden	46.25	Q
5	1	Andrea Barberi	Italy	46.47	Q, PB
6	2	Clemens Zeller	Austria	47.01	Q
7	2	Ivan Buzolin	Russia	47.14	
8	1	Jirí Vojtík	Czech Republic	47.32	
9	1	Steven Green	Great Britain	47.47	
10	2	Catalin Cîmpeanu	Romania	47.60	
11	2	David Testa	Spain	47.81	
12	1	Željko Vincek	Croatia	48.23	

=== Final ===
Rank	Name	Nationality	Time	Notes
1st place, gold medalist(s)	David Gillick	Ireland	45.52	NR
2nd place, silver medalist(s)	Bastian Swillims	Germany	45.62	PB
3rd place, bronze medalist(s)	Robert Tobin	Great Britain	46.15	
4	Johan Wissman	Sweden	46.17	SB
5	Andrea Barberi	Italy	46.47	=PB
6	Clemens Zeller	Austria	46.64	
