= 2012 IAAF World Indoor Championships – Men's 400 metres =

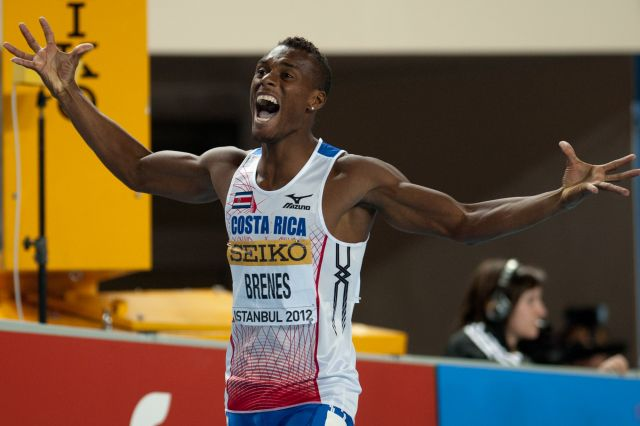
Gold medal winner Nery Brenes celebrating his win.

The men's 400 metres at the 2012 IAAF World Indoor Championships took place March 9 and 10 at the Ataköy Athletics Arena. The final was won by Costa Rican Nery Brenes in a time of 45.11.

== Doping disqualification ==
Rabah Yousif of Sudan, who ran the heat and the semifinal, retrospectively got his results disqualified for doping.

== Medalists ==
Gold	Silver	Bronze
Nery Brenes; Costa Rica	Demetrius Pinder; Bahamas	Chris Brown; Bahamas

== Records ==
Standing records prior to the 2012 IAAF World Indoor Championships
World record	Kerron Clement (USA)	44.57	Fayetteville, United States	12 March 2005
Championship record	Harry Reynolds (USA)	45.26	Toronto, Canada	14 March 1993
World Leading	Kirani James (GRN)	45.19	Fayetteville, United States	11 February 2010
African record	Sunday Bada (NGR)	45.51	Paris, France	9 March 1997
Asian record	Shunji Karube (JPN)	45.76	Paris, France	9 March 1997
European record	Thomas Schönlebe (GDR)	45.05	Sindelfingen, West Germany	5 February 1988
North and Central American and Caribbean record	Kerron Clement (USA)	44.57	Fayetteville, United States	12 March 2005
Oceanian Record	Daniel Batman (AUS)	45.93	Birmingham, Great Britain	2 March 2003
South American record	Bayano Kamani (PAN)	46.26	Boston, United States	29 January 2005

== Qualification standards ==
Indoor	Outdoor
46.90	45.20

== Schedule ==
Date	Time	Round
March 9, 2012	12:20	Heats
March 9, 2012	20:10	Semifinals
March 10, 2012	19:30	Final

== Results ==
=== Heats ===
Qualification: First 2 (Q) and the 6 fastest times qualified (q). 32 athletes from 27 countries participated.

Rank	Heat	Name	Nationality	Time	Notes
1	1	Demetrius Pinder	Bahamas	46.49	Q
2	2	Kirani James	Grenada	46.64	Q
3	1	Tabarie Henry	U.S. Virgin Islands	46.71	Q, SB
4	2	Nery Brenes	Costa Rica	46.77	Q, SB
5	5	Pavel Maslák	Czech Republic	47.00	Q
6	5	Richard Buck	Great Britain	47.05	Q
7	1	Mark Ujakpor	Spain	47.06	q
8	2	Luguelín Santos	Dominican Republic	47.07	q, PB
9	6	Chris Brown	Bahamas	47.28	Q
DQ	2	Rabah Yousif	Sudan	~~47.30~~	q
10	6	Calvin Smith Jr.	United States	47.46	Q
11	6	Ali Ekber Kayaş	Turkey	47.55	q
12	3	Nigel Levine	Great Britain	47.56	Q
13	4	Gil Roberts	United States	47.57	Q
14	5	Erison Hurtault	Dominica	47.63	q
15	4	Valentin Kruglyakov	Russia	47.70	Q
16	2	Maksim Aleksandrenko	Russia	47.78	q
17	4	Jarrin Solomon	Trinidad and Tobago	47.82	
18	6	Nika Kartavtsevi	Georgia	48.27	PB
19	3	Lorenzo Valentini	Italy	48.58	Q
20	1	Wala Gime	Papua New Guinea	48.85	
21	5	Trausti Stefánsson	Iceland	48.86	
22	4	Takeshi Fujiwara	El Salvador	48.96	SB
23	3	Bacar Houmadi Jannot	Comoros	49.58	
24	4	Kristijan Efremov	Macedonia	50.23	
25	5	Ak. Hafiy Tajuddin Rositi	Brunei	51.02	NR
26	1	Yaovi Michael Gougou	Benin	51.20	NR
27	6	Bahaa Al Farra	Palestine	51.65	NR
28	3	Andrés Silva	Uruguay	51.93	SB
29	6	Jeofry Limtiaco	Guam	53.67	PB
30	5	Hussein Al-Fedheili	Oman	55.15	PB
	3	Lalonde Gordon	Trinidad and Tobago	DQ	

=== Semifinals ===
Qualification: First 2 of each heat qualified (Q). 18 athletes from 14 countries participated.

Rank	Heat	Name	Nationality	Time	Notes
1	1	Demetrius Pinder	Bahamas	45.94	Q
2	1	Tabarie Henry	U.S. Virgin Islands	46.01	Q
2	3	Nery Brenes	Costa Rica	46.01	NR, Q
4	3	Kirani James	Grenada	46.04	Q
5	2	Chris Brown	Bahamas	46.37	Q
6	3	Nigel Levine	Great Britain	46.46	
7	2	Pavel Maslák	Czech Republic	46.49	Q
8	2	Richard Buck	Great Britain	46.68	
9	3	Luguelín Santos	Dominican Republic	46.83	PB
10	1	Mark Ujakpor	Spain	46.98	
11	1	Gil Roberts	United States	47.01	
12	2	Calvin Smith Jr.	United States	47.09	
13	3	Valentin Kruglyakov	Russia	47.34	
14	2	Ali Ekber Kayaş	Turkey	48.16	
15	1	Lorenzo Valentini	Italy	48.47	
16	3	Erison Hurtault	Dominica	48.68	
17	1	Maksim Aleksandrenko	Russia	49.76	
DQ	2	Rabah Yousif	Sudan	DNF	

=== Final ===
6 athletes from 5 countries participated. The final started at 19:31.

Rank	Name	Nationality	Time	Notes
1st place, gold medalist(s)	Nery Brenes	Costa Rica	45.11	CR, NR
2nd place, silver medalist(s)	Demetrius Pinder	Bahamas	45.34	SB
3rd place, bronze medalist(s)	Chris Brown	Bahamas	45.90	SB
4	Tabarie Henry	U.S. Virgin Islands	45.96	SB
5	Pavel Maslák	Czech Republic	46.19	
6	Kirani James	Grenada	46.21	
