= 2011 European Athletics Indoor Championships – Men's 400 metres =

The Men's 400 metres event at the 2011 European Athletics Indoor Championships was held on March 4 & 5 with the final being held on March 5 at 17:45 local time.

== Records ==
Standing records prior to the 2011 European Athletics Indoor Championships
World record	Kerron Clement (USA)	44.57	Fayetteville, United States	12 March 2005
European record	Thomas Schönlebe (GDR)	45.05	Sindelfingen, West Germany	5 February 1988
Championship record	Marek Plawgo (POL)	45.39	Vienna, Austria	3 March 2002
World Leading	Kirani James (GRN)	44.80	Fayetteville, United States	27 February 2011
European Leading	Marek Niit (EST)	45.99	Fayetteville, United States	27 February 2011

== Results ==
=== Heats ===
First 2 in each heat and 2 best performers advanced to the Semifinals. The heats were held at 10:45.

Rank	Heat	Name	Nationality	React	Time	Notes
1	1	Richard Buck	Great Britain	0.176	46.57	Q
2	5	Leslie Djhone	France	0.193	46.63	Q
3	5	Dmitriy Buryak	Russia	0.199	46.84	Q
4	1	Yoan Décimus	France	0.200	46.90	Q
5	3	Thomas Schneider	Germany	0.259	47.10	Q
6	1	Mark Ujakpor	Spain	0.166	47.31	q
7	5	Dmytro Ostrovskyy	Ukraine	0.162	47.33	q
8	3	Clemens Zeller	Austria	0.202	47.37	Q
9	3	Serdar Tamaç	Turkey	0.186	47.46	
10	2	Richard Strachan	Great Britain	0.186	47.54	Q
11	3	Brian Gregan	Ireland	0.222	47.63	
12	4	Nigel Levine	Great Britain	0.211	47.73	Q
13	4	David Gollnow	Germany	0.212	47.74	Q
14	1	Yevgen Hutsol	Ukraine	0.175	47.81	
15	2	Ansoumane Fofana	France	0.306	47.89	Q
16	2	Marc Orozco	Spain	0.160	47.92	
17	4	Johan Wissman	Sweden	0.192	47.95	
18	2	Endrik Zilbershtein	Georgia	0.239	48.07	NR
19	2	Vladimir Krasnov	Russia	0.283	48.10	
20	4	Pavel Maslák	Czech Republic	0.208	48.14	
21	5	Emir Bekrić	Serbia	0.180	48.34	
22	4	Rasmus Mägi	Estonia	0.277	48.49	
23	5	Nick Ekelund-Arenander	Denmark	0.206	48.55	
24	2	Nil de Oliveira	Sweden	0.197	48.64	
25	1	Aram Davtyan	Armenia	0.288	48.96	NR
26	3	Kristijan Efremov	Macedonia	0.269	50.35	PB

=== Semifinals ===
First 3 in each heat advanced to the Final. The semifinals were held at 18:10.

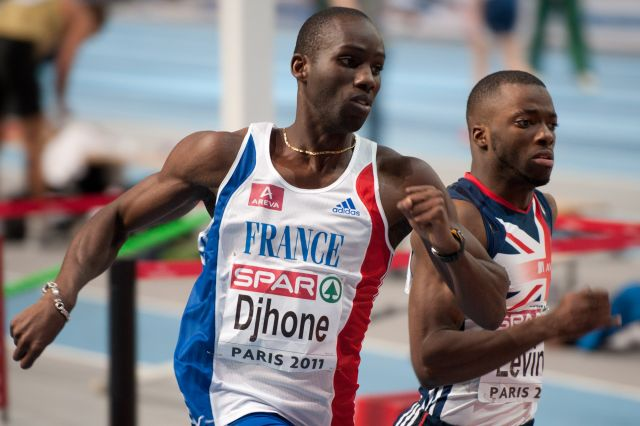
Djhone leading the semifinals.

Rank	Heat	Name	Nationality	React	Time	Notes
1	1	Leslie Djhone	France	0.199	46.26	Q
2	1	Thomas Schneider	Germany	0.255	46.72	Q
3	2	Richard Buck	Great Britain	0.202	46.79	Q
4	2	Richard Strachan	Great Britain	0.181	46.94	Q
5	2	Yoan Décimus	France	0.215	46.98	Q
6	1	Dmitriy Buryak	Russia	0.221	47.09	Q
7	1	Nigel Levine	Great Britain	0.175	47.17	
8	2	Clemens Zeller	Austria	0.230	47.35	
9	2	Dmytro Ostrovskyy	Ukraine	0.192	47.58	
10	1	Mark Ujakpor	Spain	0.190	47.82	
11	2	David Gollnow	Germany	0.260	48.07	
12	1	Ansoumane Fofana	France	0.276	48.19	

=== Final ===
The final was held at 17:45.

Rank	Lane	Name	Nationality	React	Time	Notes
1st place, gold medalist(s)	6	Leslie Djhone	France	0.181	45.54	EL
2nd place, silver medalist(s)	3	Thomas Schneider	Germany	0.286	46.42	
3rd place, bronze medalist(s)	5	Richard Buck	Great Britain	0.207	46.62	
4	2	Dmitriy Buryak	Russia	0.173	46.70	
5	4	Richard Strachan	Great Britain	0.164	46.74	
6	1	Yoan Décimus	France	0.276	46.91	
