= 2006 IAAF World Indoor Championships – Men's 400 metres =

The Men's 400 metres event at the 2006 IAAF World Indoor Championships was held on March 10–12.

== Medalists ==
Gold	Silver	Bronze
Alleyne Francique; Grenada	California Molefe; Botswana	Chris Brown; Bahamas

== Results ==
=== Heats ===
First 2 of each heat (Q) and the next 2 fastest (q) qualified for the semifinals.

Rank	Heat	Name	Nationality	Time	Notes
1	1	California Molefe	Botswana	45.74	Q, WL, NR
2	1	Dmitry Petrov	Russia	46.29	Q
3	5	Davian Clarke	Jamaica	46.37	Q
4	3	Chris Brown	Bahamas	46.64	Q
5	4	Milton Campbell	United States	46.67	Q
6	5	David McCarthy	Ireland	46.68	Q
7	3	Vladislav Frolov	Russia	46.69	Q
8	2	Alleyne Francique	Grenada	46.79	Q
9	4	Daniel Dąbrowski	Poland	46.80	Q
10	2	Marcin Marciniszyn	Poland	46.88	Q
11	3	Carlos Santa	Dominican Republic	47.00	q
12	2	Ruwen Faller	Germany	47.02	q
13	1	Oleksiy Rachkovsky	Ukraine	47.13	
14	4	Arismendy Peguero	Dominican Republic	47.32	PB
15	4	Chris Lloyd	Dominica	47.33	SB
16	1	Santiago Ezquerro	Spain	47.36	
17	5	David Canal	Spain	47.38	
18	4	Andrés Silva	Uruguay	47.50	NR
19	1	David Gillick	Ireland	47.61	SB
20	5	Anderson Jorge dos Santos	Brazil	48.19	
21	2	Valentin Bulichev	Azerbaijan	48.26	
22	3	Isaac Yaya	French Polynesia	48.45	NR
23	4	Brice Panel	France	48.52	
24	1	Chon Kin Sou	Macau	49.95	NR
25	5	Nicholas Mangham	Palau	54.80	NR
	2	Sanjay Ayre	Jamaica	DQ	
	3	Asad Iqbal	Pakistan	DQ	
	5	LaShawn Merritt	United States	DQ	

=== Semifinals ===
First 3 of each semifinal qualified directly (Q) for the final.

Rank	Heat	Name	Nationality	Time	Notes
1	1	Alleyne Francique	Grenada	45.86	Q
2	1	California Molefe	Botswana	46.02	Q
3	2	Chris Brown	Bahamas	46.10	Q
4	1	Milton Campbell	United States	46.22	Q
5	2	Davian Clarke	Jamaica	46.23	Q, SB
6	2	Dmitry Petrov	Russia	46.44	Q
7	1	Daniel Dąbrowski	Poland	46.61	
8	1	Ruwen Faller	Germany	46.67	
9	2	Marcin Marciniszyn	Poland	46.97	
10	1	Vladislav Frolov	Russia	47.11	
10	2	Carlos Santa	Dominican Republic	47.11	
10	2	David McCarthy	Ireland	47.11	

=== Final ===
Rank	Name	Nationality	Time	Notes
1st place, gold medalist(s)	Alleyne Francique	Grenada	45.54	SB
2nd place, silver medalist(s)	California Molefe	Botswana	45.75	
3rd place, bronze medalist(s)	Chris Brown	Bahamas	45.78	NR
4	Davian Clarke	Jamaica	45.93	SB
5	Milton Campbell	United States	46.15	SB
6	Dmitry Petrov	Russia	47.33	
