= 2010 IAAF World Indoor Championships – Men's 400 metres =

The men's 400 metres at the 2010 IAAF World Indoor Championships will be held at the ASPIRE Dome on 12 and 13 March.

== Medalists ==
Gold	Silver	Bronze
Chris Brown; Bahamas	William Collazo; Cuba	Jamaal Torrance; United States

== Records ==
Standing records prior to the 2010 IAAF World Indoor Championships
World record	Kerron Clement (USA)	44.57	Fayetteville, United States	12 March 2005
Championship record	Harry Reynolds (USA)	45.26	Toronto, Canada	14 March 1993
World Leading	Torrin Lawrence (USA)	45.03	Fayetteville, United States	12 February 2010
African record	Sunday Bada (NGR)	45.51	Paris, France	9 March 1997
Asian record	Shunji Karube (JPN)	45.76	Paris, France	9 March 1997
European record	Thomas Schönlebe (GDR)	45.05	Sindelfingen, West Germany	5 February 1988
North and Central American and Caribbean record	Kerron Clement (USA)	44.57	Fayetteville, United States	12 March 2005
Oceanian Record	Daniel Batman (AUS)	45.93	Birmingham, Great Britain	2 March 2003
South American record	Bayano Kamani (PAN)	46.26	Boston, United States	29 January 2005

== Qualification standards ==
Indoor	Outdoor
47.00	45.25

== Schedule ==
Date	Time	Round
March 12, 2010	9:35	Heats
March 12, 2010	19:30	Semifinals
March 13, 2010	18:05	Final

== Results ==
=== Heats ===
Qualification: First 2 in each heat (Q) and the next 2 fastest (q) advance to the semifinals.

Rank	Heat	Name	Nationality	Time	Notes
1	4	Jamaal Torrance	United States	46.70	Q
2	2	David Gillick	Ireland	46.72	Q
3	2	William Collazo	Cuba	46.78	Q
4	4	Edino Steele	Jamaica	46.80	Q
5	3	Bershawn Jackson	United States	46.87	Q
6	3	Nery Brenes	Costa Rica	46.94	Q
7	5	Chris Brown	Bahamas	46.95	Q
8	3	Richard Buck	Great Britain	47.02	q
9	1	Dmitry Buryak	Russia	47.03	Q
10	2	Ricardo Chambers	Jamaica	47.06	q
11	1	Michael Mathieu	Bahamas	47.10	Q
DQ	5	Denis Alekseyev	Russia	~~47.18~~	Q, Doping
12	1	Rabah Yousif	Sudan	47.21	
13	5	Marcin Marciniszyn	Poland	47.23	
14	1	Santiago Ezquerro	Spain	47.26	
15	4	Brian Gregan	Ireland	47.26	
16	5	Arismendy Peguero	Dominican Republic	47.28	
17	3	Clemens Zeller	Austria	47.39	
18	1	Takeshi Fujiwara	El Salvador	48.21	NR
19	2	Dale Garland	Great Britain	48.26	
20	4	Nicolas Fillon	France	48.28	
21	4	Jarrin Solomon	Trinidad and Tobago	48.37	
22	3	Lewis Banda	Zimbabwe	48.85	
23	5	Andrés Silva	Uruguay	49.09	SB
24	2	Wala Gime	Papua New Guinea	49.92	NR
25	3	Gakologelwang Masheto	Botswana	50.96	SB
26	4	Matthew Pangelinan	Guam	55.33	SB
	1	Renny Quow	Trinidad and Tobago	DNF	
	5	Mohammed Ghaleb Al-Omaisi	Yemen	DNS	

=== Semifinals ===
Qualification: First 3 in each heat (Q) qualified. to the final.

Rank	Heat	Name	Nationality	Time	Notes
1	1	Bershawn Jackson	United States	46.13	Q
2	1	David Gillick	Ireland	46.15	Q
3	1	William Collazo	Cuba	46.34	Q, PB
4	2	Chris Brown	Bahamas	46.64	Q
5	2	Jamaal Torrance	United States	46.69	Q
6	2	Nery Brenes	Costa Rica	46.73	Q, SB
7	1	Edino Steele	Jamaica	46.84	
8	2	Dmitry Buryak	Russia	46.95	
9	1	Michael Mathieu	Bahamas	47.09	
DQ	1	Denis Alekseyev	Russia	~~47.22~~	Doping
10	2	Richard Buck	Great Britain	47.70	
11	2	Ricardo Chambers	Jamaica	48.02	

=== Final ===
Rank	Name	Nationality	Time	Notes
1st place, gold medalist(s)	Chris Brown	Bahamas	45.96	SB
2nd place, silver medalist(s)	William Collazo	Cuba	46.31	PB
3rd place, bronze medalist(s)	Jamaal Torrance	United States	46.43	
4	Nery Brenes	Costa Rica	46.55	SB
5	Bershawn Jackson	United States	46.84	
	David Gillick	Ireland	DQ	
