= Takeshi Fujiwara =

Salvadoran sprinter (born 1985)

Personal information
- Native name: 藤原 武
- Full name: Takeshi Salvador Fujiwara Salazar
- Born: August 5, 1985 (age 40) San Salvador, El Salvador
- Height: 1.75 m (5 ft 9 in)
- Weight: 64 kg (141 lb)

Sport
- Country: Japan
- Event: Sprint
- Updated on 25 July 2014

Takeshi Salvador Fujiwara Salazar (Japanese: 藤原 武; born 5 August 1985) is a sprinter specializing in the 400 meters sprint event. Born in El Salvador, he represented the country until 2013, now representing Japan. He competed at the 2004 Olympic Games in Athens where he was 6th in the heats. After that he has competed in 6 other World Championships in Italy, Japan, Spain, Qatar, Turkey and in 2017 in the Bahamas World Relay Championships as a member in the 4 × 400 m and 4 × 100 m relay squad placing 6th in the B Final for team Japan.

His mother is a former Salvadorian athlete, and National and Central American champion, while his father a former Japanese Diplomat and Judo teacher serving in El Salvador.

== Competition record ==
Year	Competition	Venue	Position	Event	Notes
Representing El Salvador
2003	Central American Championships	Guatemala City, Guatemala	4th	400 m	49.29
2003	Central American Championships	Guatemala City, Guatemala	4th	4 × 100 m relay	44.64
2003	Central American Championships	Guatemala City, Guatemala	2nd	4 × 400 m relay	3:19.16
2003	Pan American Junior Championships	Bridgetown, Barbados	4th (h)	200 m	23.02
2003	Pan American Junior Championships	Bridgetown, Barbados	17th (h)	400 m	50.12
2003	Central American Junior Championships (U20)	San José, Costa Rica	5th (h)	200 m	22.86
2003	Central American Junior Championships (U20)	San José, Costa Rica	2nd	400 m	49.13
2003	Central American Junior Championships (U20)	San José, Costa Rica	4th	4 × 100 m relay	44.19
2003	Central American Junior Championships (U20)	San José, Costa Rica	1st	4 × 400 m relay	3:24.49
2004	Central American Junior Championships	San José, Costa Rica	1st	400 m	47.80
2004	World Junior Championships	Grosseto, Italy	42nd (h)	400 m	49.66
2004	Olympic Games	Athens, Greece	56th (h)	400 m	48.46
2004	Central American Championships	Managua, Nicaragua	4th	200 m	22.20
2004	Central American Championships	Managua, Nicaragua	3rd	400 m	48.53
2004	Central American Championships	Managua, Nicaragua	4th	4 × 100 m relay	44.66
2004	Central American Championships	Managua, Nicaragua	2nd	4 × 400 m relay	3:21.98
2006	Ibero-American Championships	Ponce, Puerto Rico	12th (h)	400 m	48.26
2007	Central American Championships	San José, Costa Rica	3rd	400 m	48.21
2007	Central American Championships	San José, Costa Rica	3rd	4 × 100 m relay	42.34
2007	Central American Championships	San José, Costa Rica	3rd	4 × 400 m relay	3:20.95
2007	NACAC Championships	San Salvador, El Salvador	10th (h)	400 m	47.75
2007	NACAC Championships	San Salvador, El Salvador	6th	4 × 400 m relay	3:23.90
2007	World Championships	Osaka, Japan	45th (h)	400 m	46.92 (NR)
2008	World Indoor Championships	Valencia, Spain	24th (h)	400 m	48.82 (iNR)
2008	Central American Championships	San Pedro Sula, Honduras	2nd	400 m	47.89
2008	Central American Championships	San Pedro Sula, Honduras	2nd	4 × 400 m relay	3:20.70
2008	Central American and Caribbean Championships	Cali, Colombia	16th (h)	400 m	47.88
2009	Universiade	Belgrade, Serbia	40th (h)	200 m	21.89
2009	Universiade	Belgrade, Serbia	17th (sf)	400 m	47.43
2010	World Indoor Championships	Doha, Qatar	19th (h)	400 m	48.21 (iNR)
2010	Central American Games	Panama City, Panama	2nd	200 m	21.62
2010	Central American Games	Panama City, Panama	2nd	400 m	47.70
2010	Ibero-American Championships	San Fernando, Spain	9th (h)	400 m	47.05
2010	Central American and Caribbean Games	Mayagüez, Puerto Rico	14th (h)	400 m	47.66
2010	Central American Championships	Guatemala City, Guatemala	1st	400 m	47.33
2010	Central American Championships	Guatemala City, Guatemala	3rd	4 × 100 m relay	43.17
2010	Central American Championships	Guatemala City, Guatemala	3rd	4 × 400 m relay	3:23.54
2011	ALBA Games	Barquisimeto, Venezuela	7th	200 m	21.65 w (wind: +2.4 m/s)
2011	ALBA Games	Barquisimeto, Venezuela	4th	400 m	46.48
2011	Central American Championships	San José, Costa Rica	2nd	400 m	47.12
2011	Central American Championships	San José, Costa Rica	2nd	4 × 400 m relay	3:21.45
2011	Central American and Caribbean Championships	Mayagüez, Puerto Rico	7th (h)	400 m	47.00
2011	Pan American Games	Guadalajara, Mexico	14th (h)	400 m	46.92
2012	World Indoor Championships	Istanbul, Turkey	23rd (h)	400 m	48.96
Representing Japan
2017	IAAF World Relays	Nassau, Bahamas	6th (B)	4 × 100 m relay	40.31

== Personal bests ==
Outdoor

- 100 metres - 10.72 (Nacogdoches 2010)
- 200 metres - 21.48 (Nacogdoches 2009)
- 400 metres - 45.44 (San José 2016)

Indoor

- 200 metres - 22.51 (Houston 2008)
- 400 metres - 48.21 (Doha 2010)
