= Clemens Zeller =

Austrian sprinter

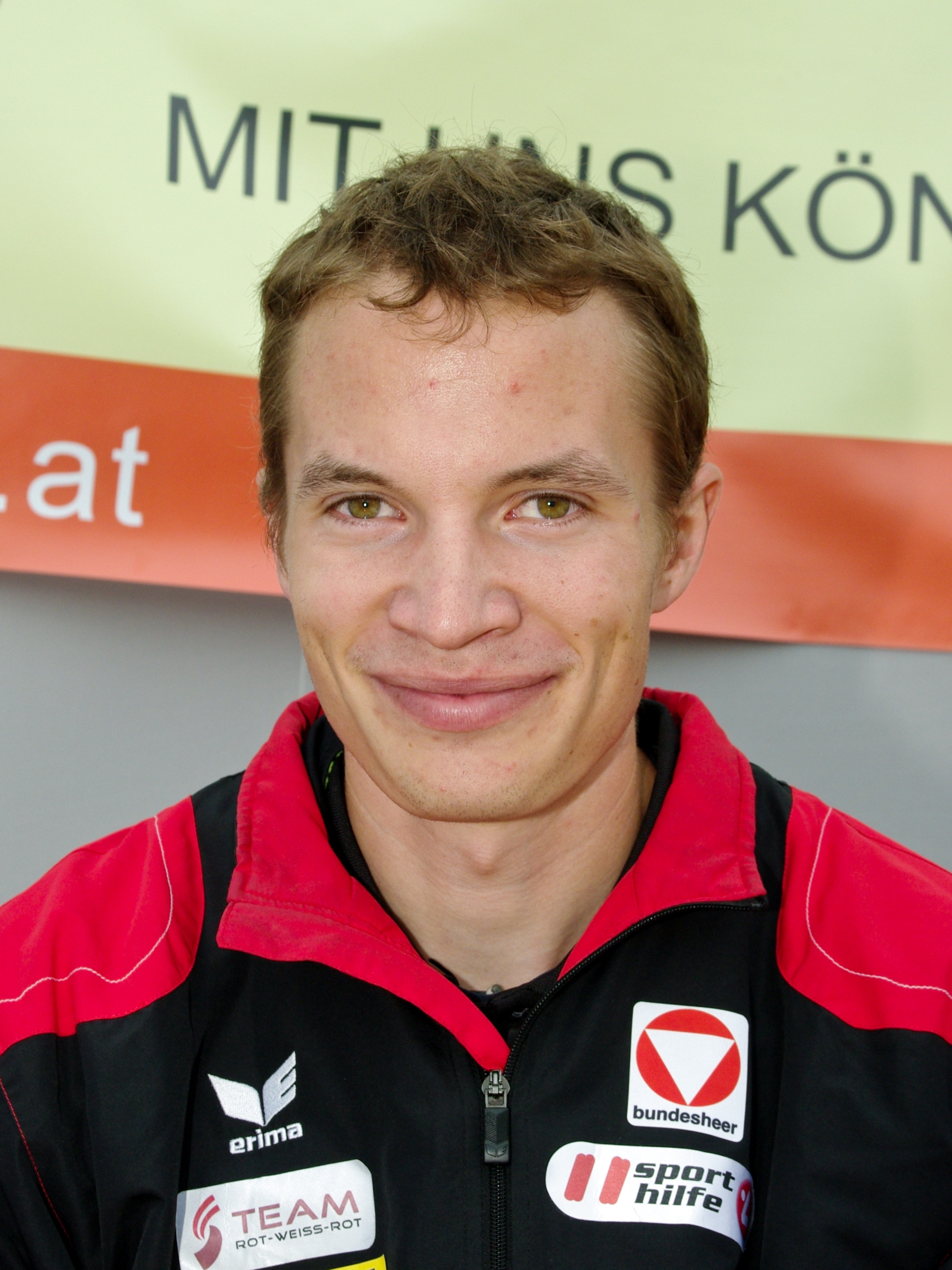
Clemens Zeller (2010)

Clemens Zeller (born July 2, 1984) is an Austrian male sprinter.

== Achievements ==
Year	Competition	Venue	Position	Event	Notes
Representing Austria
2007	European Indoor Championships	Birmingham, United Kingdom	6th	400 m	46.64
2007	World Championships	Osaka, Japan	38th (h)	400 m	46.06
2008	World Indoor Championships	Valencia, Spain	12th (h)	400 m	47.34
2009	European Indoor Championships	Turin, Italy	4th	400 m	46.62
2009	Universiade	Belgrade, Serbia	2nd	400 m	46.12
2010	World Indoor Championships	Doha, Qatar	18th (h)	400 m	47.39
2010	European Championships	Barcelona, Spain	—	400 m	DNF
2011	European Indoor Championships	Paris, France	8th (sf)	400 m	47.35
