= Santiago Ezquerro (sprinter) =

Spanish sprinter (born 1981)

Personal information
- Full name: Santiago Ezquerro Cordón
- Born: 11 September 1981 (age 44) Logroño, La Rioja, Spain
- Height: 1.79 m (5 ft 10 in)
- Weight: 73 kg (161 lb)

Sport
- Sport: Athletics
- Event: 400 metres
- Club: La Rioja Atletismo
- Coached by: Valvanera Guridi

Santiago Ezquerro Cordón (born 11 September 1981) is a retired Spanish sprinter who specialised in the 400 metres. He represented his country at three World Indoor Championships. He officially retired in 2014, having been unable to compete due to injuries since 2010.

== International competitions ==
Year	Competition	Venue	Position	Event	Notes
Representing Spain
2003	World Indoor Championships	Birmingham, United Kingdom	15th (h)	200 m	21.31
2004	Ibero-American Championships	Huelva, Spain	5th	200 m	21.71
2004	Ibero-American Championships	Huelva, Spain	2nd	4 × 100 m relay	39.70
2005	European Indoor Championships	Madrid, Spain	–	200 m	DQ
2005	European Indoor Championships	Madrid, Spain	5th	4 × 400 m relay	3:11.72
2006	World Indoor Championships	Moscow, Russia	16th (h)	400 m	47.36
2006	World Indoor Championships	Moscow, Russia	7th (h)	4 × 400 m relay	3:08.07
2006	European Championships	Gothenburg, Sweden	8th	4 × 400 m relay	3:04.98
2007	European Indoor Championships	Birmingham, United Kingdom	15th (h)	400 m	47.61
2009	European Indoor Championships	Turin, Italy	15th (h)	400 m	47.45
2009	Mediterranean Games	Pescara, Italy	14th (h)	400 m	47.52
2009	Mediterranean Games	Pescara, Italy	1st	4 × 400 m relay	3:06.19
2010	World Indoor Championships	Doha, Qatar	14th (h)	400 m	47.26
2010	European Championships	Barcelona, Spain	12th (h)	4 × 400 m relay	3:07.38

== Personal bests ==
Outdoor

- 200 metres – 21.40 (+1.9 m/s, Seville 2004)
- 400 metres – 46.70 (Barcelona 2008)

Indoor

- 200 metres – 21.09 (Valencia 2003)
- 400 metres – 46.83 (Valencia 2010)
