= Michael Bingham =

British 400m athlete (born 1986)

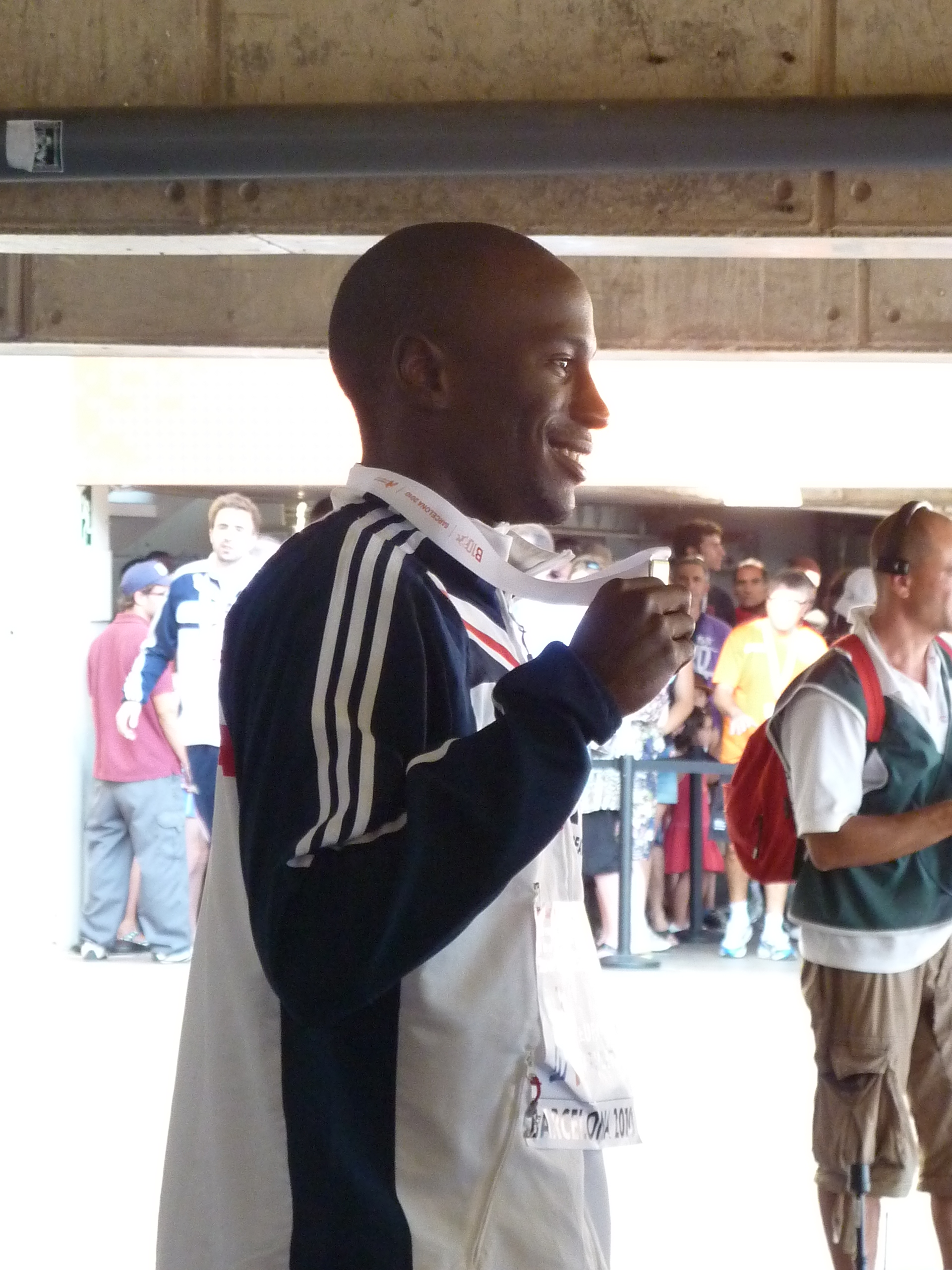
- Bingham in Barcelona 2010

Personal information
- Nationality: British/American
- Born: 13 April 1986 (age 40) Sylva, North Carolina, U.S.
- Height: 183 cm (6 ft 0 in)
- Weight: 75 kg (165 lb)

Sport
- Sport: Athletics
- Event(s): 200 metres, 400 metres
- College team: Wake Forest University
Medal record
Representing Great Britain
Olympic Games
Bronze medal – third place	2008 Beijing	4 × 400 m relay
World Championships
Silver medal – second place	2009 Berlin	4 × 400 m relay
World Indoor Championships
Silver medal – second place	2012 Istanbul	4 × 400 m relay
Silver medal – second place	2014 Sopot	4 × 400 m relay
European Championships
Gold medal – first place	2014 Zürich	4 × 400 m relay
Silver medal – second place	2010 Barcelona	400 metres
Silver medal – second place	2010 Barcelona	4 × 400 m relay
European Indoor Championships
Gold medal – first place	2013 Gothenburg	4 × 400 m relay
Continental Cup
Bronze medal – third place	2010 Split	400 m
Representing England
Commonwealth Games
Gold medal – first place	2014 Glasgow	4 × 400 m relay
Representing United States
Pan American Junior Championships
Bronze medal – third place	2005 Windsor	Decathlon

Michael Allen Oswald Bingham (born 13 April 1986) is an American-born British 400 metres track and field athlete. The silver medalist in the individual 400 metres at the 2010 European Championships, his most notable successes came as a long-time member of the Great Britain and England 4 × 400 metre relay squads. A European indoor, European outdoor and Commonwealth Games champion in the long relay, Bingham won medals at every major indoor and outdoor championships available to him, winning Olympic bronze in 2008, World outdoor silver and World indoor silver (twice), in addition to the gold medals at European and Commonwealth Games level.

== Early life ==
He is one of five children born to British citizen Norris Bingham and Mollissie in Sylva, North Carolina. His parents separated when he was young, and he was raised by his mother, attending The McCallie School. Bingham holds the school record in the 100 m, 200 m, 300IH, 4 × 100 m, 4 × 200 m, 4 × 400 m, 110 m hurdles and decathlon.

== Collegiate and professional career ==
Bingham studied at Wake Forest University, and after transferring allegiance on April 30, 2008, Bingham was part of the Great Britain 4 × 400 m relay team at the 2008 Summer Olympics, that came 3rd in Beijing. He ran a personal best of 44.74 in the 400 m semi-finals of 2009 World Championships in Athletics, qualifying for the final where he finished 7th. He then won silver with the Great Britain 4 × 400 m relay team with Conrad Williams, Robert Tobin and Martyn Rooney. He was formerly managed by Michael Johnson.

== Personal life ==
On 9 November 2013, he married Shana Cox, also an American-born sprinter representing Great Britain.
