= Kristijan Efremov =

Macedonian sprinter

Kristian Efremov
Personal information
- Born: August 31, 1990 (age 35) Veles, Yugoslavia
- Height: 1.84 m (6 ft 1/2 in)
- Weight: 72 kg (159 lb)

Sport
- Sport: Athletics
- Event: 400 m

Kristian Efremov (Macedonian: Кристијан Ефремов; born 31 August 1990 in Veles) is a Macedonian sprinter. He represented his country at the 2012 Summer Olympics as well as two World Indoor Championships.

His personal bests in the event are 47.92 seconds outdoors (London 2012) and 49.49 seconds indoors (Stockholm 2016).

== Competition record ==
Year	Competition	Venue	Position	Event	Notes
Representing North Macedonia
2007	European Junior Championships	Hengelo, Netherlands	24th (h)	400 m	52.88
2007	European Youth Olympic Festival	Belgrade, Serbia	22nd (h)	400 m	52.87
2009	European Junior Championships	Novi Sad, Serbia	27th (h)	400 m	50.96
2011	European Indoor Championships	Paris, France	26th (h)	400 m	50.35
2012	World Indoor Championships	Istanbul, Turkey	25th (h)	400 m	50.23
2012	European Championships	Helsinki, Finland	29th (h)	400 m	48.80
2012	Olympic Games	London, United Kingdom	44th (h)	400 m	47.92
2013	Mediterranean Games	Mersin, Turkey	10th (h)	400 m	48.87
2016	World Indoor Championships	Portland, United States	26th (h)	400 m	50.28
