= Martyn Rooney =

English sprinter (born 1987)

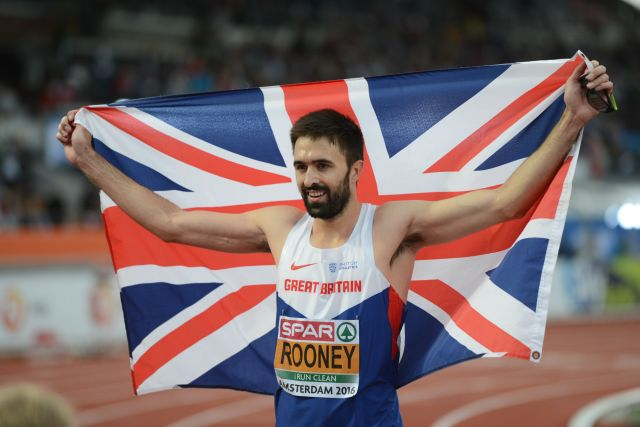
- Rooney at the 2016 European Athletics Championships

Personal information
- Nationality: British
- Born: 3 April 1987 (age 39) Croydon, England
- Height: 1.98 m (6 ft 6 in)
- Weight: 81 kg (179 lb)
- Spouse: Kate Dennison

Sport
- Sport: Athletics
- Event: 400 metres
- Club: Croydon Harriers

Achievements and titles
- Personal best: 400 m: 44.45 s (Beijing 2015)
Medal record
Men's athletics
Representing Great Britain
Olympic Games
Bronze medal – third place	2008 Beijing	4 × 400 m relay
World Championships
Silver medal – second place	2009 Berlin	4 × 400 m relay
Bronze medal – third place	2015 Beijing	4 × 400 m relay
Bronze medal – third place	2017 London	4 × 400 m relay
European Championships
Gold medal – first place	2014 Zurich	400 m
Gold medal – first place	2014 Zurich	4 × 400 m relay
Gold medal – first place	2016 Amsterdam	400 m
Silver medal – second place	2010 Barcelona	4 × 400 m relay
Silver medal – second place	2018 Berlin	4 × 400 m relay
Bronze medal – third place	2010 Barcelona	400 m
Representing Europe
Continental Cup
Silver medal – second place	2010 Split	4 × 400 m relay
Silver medal – second place	2014 Marrakesh	4 × 400 m relay
Men's athletics (junior)
Representing Great Britain
World Junior Championships
Bronze medal – third place	2006 Beijing	400 m
Bronze medal – third place	2006 Beijing	4 × 400 m relay
European Junior Championships
Gold medal – first place	2005 Kaunas	4 × 400 m relay
Silver medal – second place	2005 Kaunas	400 m

Martyn Joseph Rooney (born 3 April 1987) is an English sprinter who specialises in the 400 metres event. He reached the 400 m final at the 2008 Summer Olympics and won bronze in the 4 × 400 metres relay. A mainstay on the anchor leg of the Great Britain and England 4 × 400 metre relay teams, at the 2009 World Championships in Athletics he won a silver medal with the Great Britain relay team, and bronze in the 2015 and 2017 World Championships.

Individually, Rooney was twice the European champion at 400 metres in 2014. and 2016.

A five time national champion, his personal best time of 44.45 seconds ranks sixth all-time in Great Britain behind national record-holder Matthew Hudson-Smith, Charlie Dobson, Roger Black, Mark Richardson and Iwan Thomas.

== Career ==
Born and raised in Thornton Heath, London, the second of four children born to Marie (née Martyn) and Liam Rooney Sr., Irish immigrants from Sligo and Westmeath, respectively, Rooney started running for Croydon Harriers just before starting his secondary school, The John Fisher School. He attended St James the Great Primary School, Thornton Heath where his mum teaches. As a result, he became an avid Crystal Palace F.C. fan. Initially training and competing at the middle distances; 800 metres and 1500 metres and doing cross country throughout the winter, Rooney's talent for the one lap sprint was discovered by coincidence when he stood in to make up points at a London fixture.

Rooney was selected to represent Great Britain at the 2005 European Juniors, held in Lithuania in July of that year. He achieved the silver medal in the individuals and gold with the relay team and on his return home was then asked to make up the senior's 4 × 400 m men's relay team at the 2005 IAAF World Championships in Athletics, held that year in Helsinki, Finland. Rooney was originally running only in the heat, but impressing the GB coaches with a time of 44.9 seconds, he was selected to also run in the final. Despite completing his leg in 44.8 seconds, Rooney and teammates Timothy Benjamin, Robert Tobin and Malachi Davis came in fourth, with a sub three-minute time. Rooney represented England in the 2006 Commonwealth Games held in Melbourne, Australia.

Despite impressing everyone throughout the heats, he came fifth in the final with a time of 45.51 seconds and set a new British Junior Record, previous held by Roger Black for 20 years. The English 4 × 400 m Men's relay team came in fourth at the Games. At the 2006 World Junior Championships in Beijing he finished third in 45.87 seconds. The British relay team too finished third, earning him a second bronze medal of the Championships. During 2008, Rooney had a successful season where he went comfortably under the 45-second barrier with a 44.83 at the London Grand Prix. At the 2008 Beijing Olympics, Rooney set a new personal best in the Semi-final and finished sixth in the final. He also anchored GB to 4th in the relay with a 43.7 split, second fastest ever by a Briton. It was announced on 13 September 2016 that the Russian athlete Denis Alexee, had failed a retest of his sample from the 2008 Olympics. This means that Rooney will be upgraded to a bronze medal from the 4 × 400 m along with Michael Bingham, Robert Tobin and Andrew Steele.

At the 2009 World Championships in Athletics, he reached the semi-finals of the 400 m, but finished seventh and did not compete in the final. Running with Conrad Williams, Michael Bingham and Robert Tobin, Rooney had greater success in the men's relay event, winning the silver medal behind the winning team from the United States. He started the 2010 outdoor season with a European leading time of 44.99 seconds to win at the Atletica Geneve Meeting. He went on to win bronze in the 400 metres at the European Championships in Barcelona. He won a silver medal in the relay.

Rooney had a disappointing 2011, knocked out in the semi-finals of the 400 metres at the World Championships in Daegu and finishing eighth as part of the British team in the 4 × 400 m relay. In 2012, Rooney started well, running 44.92s in April at the Mt. SAC Relays in Walnut, California, his fastest time since 2008. Rooney was unable to sustain that form going into his home Olympics, and he was eliminated in the semi-final of the 400 metres, running 45.31s. In the 4 × 400 metres relay final Rooney received the baton in sixth place and ran a blistering 44.1 second anchor leg, but was just unable to overtake Deon Lendore of Trinidad and so finished fourth.

In Moscow 2013, Rooney competed for GB in the 4 × 400 m relay, running 44.77 in the heats and 44.50 seconds in the final, where he switched from the 4th leg to the 2nd leg.

In the 2014 Commonwealth Games, Rooney competed in the 400 m and made it through to the finals coming first, but came fourth in the finals with a time of 45.15. Rooney took his first individual European title in the final of the 400 m at the 2014 European Athletics Championships in Zurich with a time of 44.71.

In the 2017 World Athletics Championships in London, Rooney failed to qualify for the semi-final finishing 6th in his heat in a time of 45.75.

== Personal life ==
Martyn is coached by Rana Reider, coach to Olympic Champion Christian Taylor amongst other World and Olympic medalists. Martyn is also coached by British Strength and Conditioning expert Michael Johnston.

He is married to former British pole vault record holder Kate Rooney (née Dennison). In August 2015, their first child, a son, was born. Their second, a daughter was born in August 2017.

== Personal bests ==
Distance	Time	Place	Date
400 m	44.45 sec	Beijing, China	23 August 2015
