= Cătălin Cîmpeanu =

Romanian sprinter

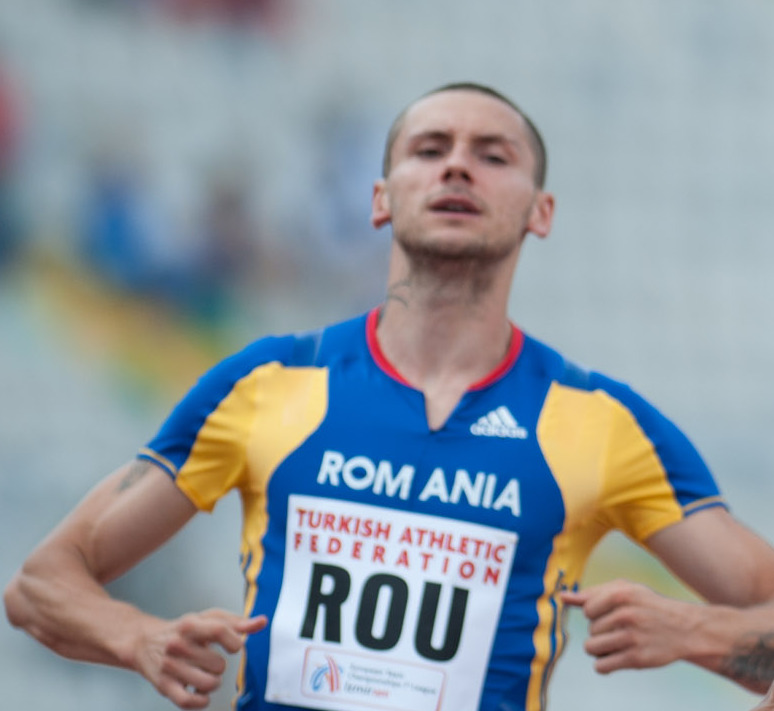

Personal information
- Born: 10 March 1985 (age 40)

Sport
- Sport: Track and field
- Event: Sprints

Catalin Cîmpeanu (born 10 March 1985) is a Romanian athlete specialising in the sprinting events, early in his career concentrating on the 400 metres, before later moving down to 100 metres. He represented his country at many continental level international competitions, his best result being the seventh place at the 2014 European Championships.

He co-holds the national record in the outdoor and indoor 4 × 400 metres relay, as well as in the indoor 60 metres.

== Competition record ==
Year	Competition	Venue	Position	Event	Notes
Representing Romania
2005	European U23 Championships	Erfurt, Germany	26th (h)	400 m	47.90
2005	European U23 Championships	Erfurt, Germany	4th	4x400 m relay	3:05.29
2006	European Championships	Gothenburg, Sweden	28th (h)	400 m	47.16
2006	European Championships	Gothenburg, Sweden	6th	4x400 m relay	3:04.53
2007	European Indoor Championships	Birmingham, United Kingdom	10th (sf)	400 m	47.60
2007	European Indoor Championships	Birmingham, United Kingdom	5th	4x400 m relay	3:10.75
2007	European U23 Championships	Debrecen, Hungary	14th (sf)	400 m	47.75
2009	European Indoor Championships	Turin, Italy	29th (h)	60 m	6.88
2009	European Indoor Championships	Turin, Italy	25th (h)	400 m	48.66
2009	Universiade	Belgrade, Serbia	8th (sf)	100 m	10.44
2009	Universiade	Belgrade, Serbia	31st (h)	200 m	21.66
2010	European Championships	Barcelona, Spain	19th (sf)	400 m	46.43
2010	European Championships	Barcelona, Spain	16th (h)	4x400 m relay	3:09.48
2012	European Championships	Helsinki, Finland	27th (h)	100 m	10.65
2012	European Championships	Helsinki, Finland	26th (h)	200 m	21.37
2013	European Indoor Championships	Gothenburg, Sweden	8th (sf)	60 m	6.66
2014	European Championships	Zürich, Switzerland	7th	100 m	10.44
2014	European Championships	Zürich, Switzerland	13th (h)	4x100 m relay	39.67
2015	European Indoor Championships	Prague, Czech Republic	19th (sf)	60 m	6.73
2016	European Championships	Amsterdam, Netherlands	16th (h)	4x100 m relay	39.98

== Personal bests ==
Outdoor

- 100 metres – 10.28 (0.0 m/s) (Bucharest 2008)
- 200 metres – 20.81 (+0.7 m/s) (Bucharest 2008)
- 400 metres – 46.17 (Barcelona 2010)

Indoor

- 60 metres – 6.60 (Bucharest 2013) NR
- 400 metres – 47.05 (Birmingham 2007)
