= 2005 European Athletics Indoor Championships – Men's 400 metres =

The Men's 400 metres event at the 2005 European Athletics Indoor Championships was held on March 4–5.

== Medalists ==
Gold	Silver	Bronze
David Gillick; Ireland	David Canal; Spain	Sebastian Gatzka; Germany

== Results ==
=== Heats ===
The winner of each heat (Q) and the next 3 fastest (q) qualified for the final.

Rank	Heat	Name	Nationality	Time	Notes
1	1	David Gillick	Ireland	46.17	Q, PB
2	3	Dmitriy Forshev	Russia	46.60	Q, SB
3	2	David Canal	Spain	46.72	Q
4	3	Sebastian Gatzka	Germany	46.74	q
5	2	Volodymyr Demchenko	Ukraine	46.87	q, PB
6	1	Dale Garland	Great Britain	46.89	q, PB
6	2	Marcin Marciniszyn	Poland	46.89	PB
8	1	Zsolt Szeglet	Hungary	47.04	
9	1	Stilianos Dimotsios	Greece	47.35	
10	2	David McCarthy	Ireland	47.36	
11	3	Rob Daly	Ireland	47.53	SB
12	1	Remi Wallard	France	47.72	
13	3	Brice Panel	France	47.72	
14	2	Naor Greene	Israel	48.78	

=== Final ===
Rank	Name	Nationality	Time	Notes
1st place, gold medalist(s)	David Gillick	Ireland	46.30	
2nd place, silver medalist(s)	David Canal	Spain	46.64	
3rd place, bronze medalist(s)	Sebastian Gatzka	Germany	46.88	
4	Dmitriy Forshev	Russia	47.37	
5	Volodymyr Demchenko	Ukraine	47.39	
6	Dale Garland	Great Britain	47.59	
