= Alleyne Francique =

Grenadian sprinter

Personal information
- Full name: Alleyne Jeremy Francique
- Born: June 7, 1976 (age 50) St. Andrew's, Grenada
- Height: 1.88 m (6 ft 2 in)
- Weight: 75 kg (165 lb)
Medal record
Men's Athletics
Representing Grenada
IAAF World Indoor Championships
Gold medal – first place	2004 Budapest	400 metres
Gold medal – first place	2006 Moscow	400 metres
Central American and Caribbean Games
Silver medal – second place	2006 Cartagena	400 metres
Commonwealth Games
Silver medal – second place	2006 Melbourne	400 metres

Alleyne Jeremy Francique (born June 7, 1976) is a retired Grenadian athlete who specialized in 400 metres, his personal best being 44.47 seconds set in 2004. He is the 400 m two-time world indoor champion in 2004 and 2006.

He won his first world-level medal in 2003, when he finished third in the first World Athletics Final in 45.25 s. He had won a 400 metres gold medal and finished fifth in 4 × 400 metres relay at the 2003 Central American and Caribbean Championships.

The next year he won the gold medal at the World Indoor Championships, achieving the result 45.88 s. Later that year he competed in 400 metres at the 2004 Summer Olympics, and finished fourth with 44.66 s.

In the 2005 World Championships in Helsinki, he competed in 400 metres but only reached the semi-finals, running 46.59 s which is far above his personal best. In 2006, however, he defended his title at the World Indoor Championships with 45.54 s. In March the same year he won a silver medal at the 2006 Commonwealth Games. He then finished sixth at the World Athletics Final and fourth at the World Cup.

Francique ran track collegiately at Louisiana State University.

== Competition record ==
Year	Competition	Venue	Position	Event	Notes
Representing Grenada
1996	Olympic Games	Atlanta, United States	–	4 × 400 m	DQ
1998	Central American and Caribbean Games	Maracaibo, Venezuela	10th (sf)	400 m	47.96
1998	Central American and Caribbean Games	Maracaibo, Venezuela	16th (h)	800 m	1:54.68
1999	Pan American Games	Winnipeg, Canada	14th (h)	400 m	46.46
1999	World Championships	Seville, Spain	42nd (h)	400 m	47.49
2001	Central American and Caribbean Championships	Guatemala City, Guatemala	4th	400 m	45.95
2001	World Championships	Edmonton, Canada	6th	400 m	46.23
2002	Commonwealth Games	Manchester, United Kingdom	5th	400 m	45.47
2003	World Indoor Championships	Birmingham, United Kingdom	–	400 m	DQ
2003	Central American and Caribbean Championships	St. George's, Grenada	1st	400 m	45.27
2003	Central American and Caribbean Championships	St. George's, Grenada	5th	4 × 400 m	3:06.98
2003	Pan American Games	Santo Domingo, Dom. Rep.	3rd	400 m	45.51
2003	Pan American Games	Santo Domingo, Dom. Rep.	8th	4 × 400 m	3:09.50
2003	World Championships	Paris, France	6th	400 m	45.48
2004	World Indoor Championships	Budapest, Hungary	1st	400 m	45.88
2004	Olympic Games	Athens, Greece	4th	400 m	44.66
2005	World Championships	Helsinki, Finland	13th (sf)	400 m	46.59
2006	World Indoor Championships	Moscow, Russia	1st	400 m	45.54
2006	Commonwealth Games	Melbourne, Australia	2nd	400 m	45.09
2006	Central American and Caribbean Games	Cartagena, Colombia	2nd	400 m	45.44
2007	Pan American Games	Rio de Janeiro, Brazil	5th	400 m	45.49
2007	World Championships	Osaka, Japan	17th (sf)	400 m	45.41
2008	World Indoor Championships	Valencia, Spain	23rd (h)	400 m	48.64
2008	Olympic Games	Beijing, China	35th (h)	400 m	46.15

Olympic Games
Preceded by Hazel-Ann Regis	Flagbearer for Grenada; Athens 2004; Beijing 2008	Succeeded by Kirani James
