= Demetrius Pinder =

Bahamian sprinter (born 1989)

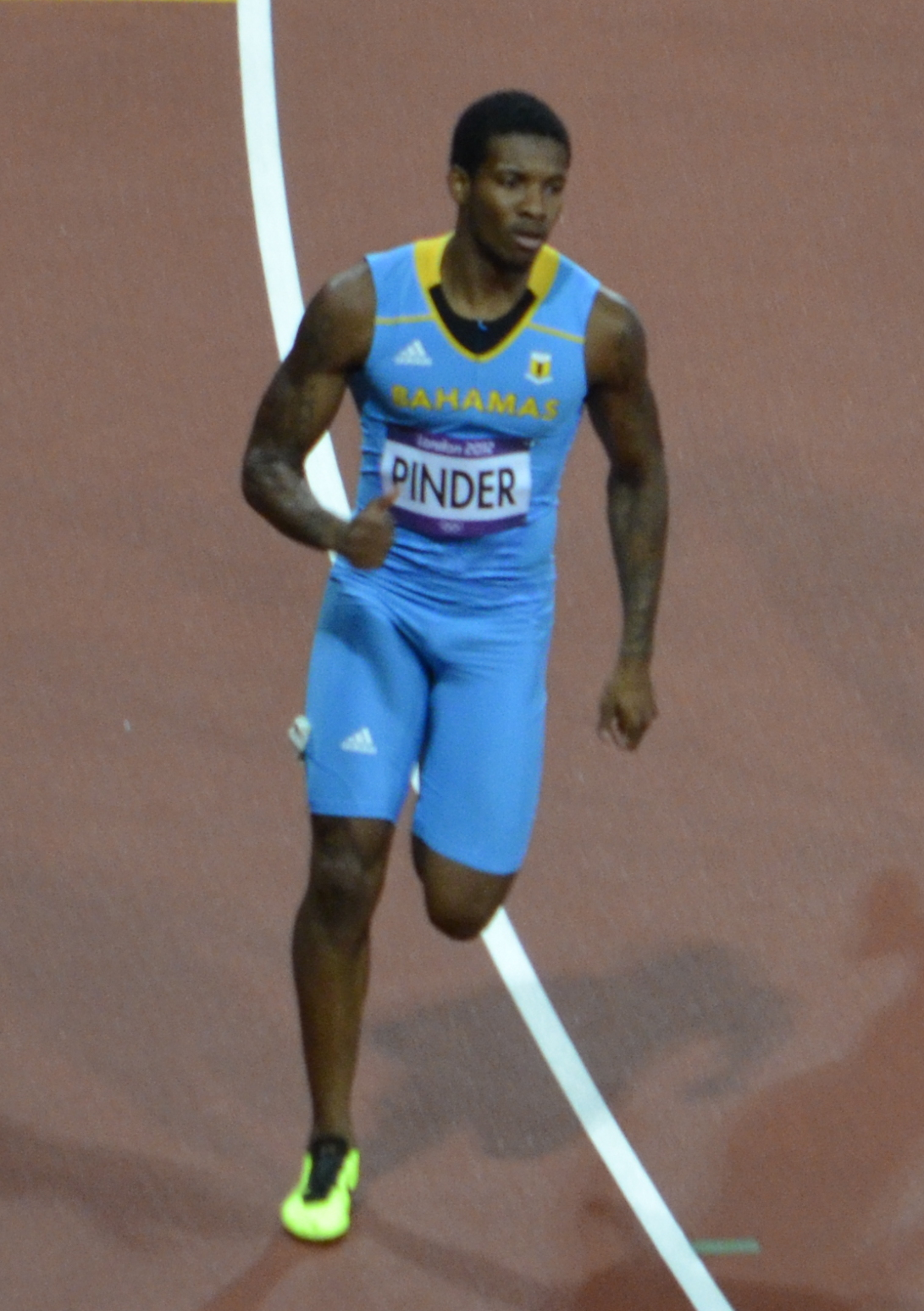
- Demetrius at the 2012 Olympics

Personal information
- Nationality: Bahamian
- Born: 13 February 1989 (age 37) Grand Bahama, Bahamas
- Height: 5 ft 10 in (178 cm)
- Weight: 154 lb (70 kg)

Sport
- Sport: Athletics
- Event: 400 metres
- College team: Texas A&M University

Achievements and titles
- Personal bests: 200 m: 20.23 (-1.1 m/s) 400 m: 44.63 400 m (Indoors): 45.33 (NR)
Medal record
Men's athletics
Representing the Bahamas
Olympic Games
Gold medal – first place	2012 London	4 × 400 m relay
World Relay Championships
Silver medal – second place	2014 Nassau	4 × 400 m relay
Silver medal – second place	2015 Nassau	4 × 400 m relay
World Indoor Championships
Silver medal – second place	2012 Istanbul	400 m
Central American and Caribbean Games
Silver medal – second place	2010 Mayagüez	4 × 400 m relay
NACAC U-23 Championships
Silver medal – second place	2010 Miramar	4 × 400 meters
Bronze medal – third place	2010 Miramar	400 meters
CARIFTA Games Junior (U20)
Silver medal – second place	2006 Les Abymes	4 × 400 m relay
Bronze medal – third place	2007 Providenciales	4 × 400 m relay
Bronze medal – third place	2008 Basseterre	4 × 400 m relay

Demetrius Pinder (born 13 February 1989) is a Bahamian track and field sprint athlete who competes in the 400 metres. His personal best for the event is 44.63 seconds. At the 2012 London Olympics he was a 400 m finalist and relay gold medallist.

He was born in Freeport, Grand Bahama where he attended Tabernacle Baptist Christian Academy. He then competed for Essex County Junior College and Texas A&M University. In March 2011 he broke the 400 m indoor Bahamian national record of 45.78 previously held by Chris Brown with his 45.33 win at the 2011 NCAA Division I Indoor Championships. He won a 400 m silver medal in the 2012 IAAF World Indoor Championships in Istanbul. He placed seventh in the 400 m final at 2012 London Olympic Games. He also won gold at the 2012 London Olympics with the Bahamas 4 × 400 team, of himself, Chris Brown, Michael Mathieu and Ramon Miller beating medal favorites USA with a national record.

In 2013 his Olympic Gold medal was stolen out of his vehicle in Bradenton, Florida, but it was later retrieved by local police.

== Personal bests ==
Event	Time	Venue	Date
200 m	20.23 (-1.2 m/s)	Miami, United States	14 April 2012
400 m	44.77	Nassau, Bahamas	23 June 2012
400 m	45.33 (indoor) (NR)	College Station, United States	12 March 2011

== International competitions ==
Year	Competition	Venue	Position	Event	Notes
Representing Bahamas
2006	CARIFTA Games (U-20)	Les Abymes, Guadeloupe	7th	400 m	49.42
2006	CARIFTA Games (U-20)	Les Abymes, Guadeloupe	2nd	4 × 400 m relay	3:08.56
2007	CARIFTA Games (U-20)	Providenciales, Turks and Caicos Islands	3rd (h)	200 m	21.71 (3.3 m/s)
2007	CARIFTA Games (U-20)	Providenciales, Turks and Caicos Islands	5th	400 m	48.50
2008	CARIFTA Games (U-20)	Basseterre, Saint Kitts and Nevis	4th	400 m	47.59
2008	CARIFTA Games (U-20)	Basseterre, Saint Kitts and Nevis	3rd	4 × 400 m relay	3:12.09
2010	NACAC U23 Championships	Miramar, United States	3rd	400 m	45.90
2010	NACAC U23 Championships	Miramar, United States	2nd	4 × 400 m relay	3:02.91
2010	Central American and Caribbean Games	Mayagüez, Puerto Rico	9th (h)	400 m	46.29
2010	Central American and Caribbean Games	Mayagüez, Puerto Rico	2nd	4 × 400 m relay	3:01.8
2011	Central American and Caribbean Championships	Mayagüez, Puerto Rico	2nd (h)	200 m	20.70
2011	World Championships	Daegu, South Korea	15th (sf)	400 m	45.87
2011	World Championships	Daegu, South Korea	9th (h)	4 × 400 m relay	3:01.54
2012	World Indoor Championships	Istanbul, Turkey	2nd	400 m	45.34
2012	Olympic Games	London, United Kingdom	1st	4 × 400 m relay	2:56.72
2016	Olympic Games	Rio de Janeiro, Brazil	–	200 m	DQ
2016	Olympic Games	Rio de Janeiro, Brazil	3rd	4 × 400 m relay	2:58.49
2017	IAAF World Relays	Nassau, Bahamas	5th (B)	4 × 400 m relay	3:08.29
