= Athletics at the 2007 Pan American Games – Men's 400 metres =

Men's 400 metres at the Pan American Games

The men's 400 metres event at the 2007 Pan American Games was held on July 23–25.

== Medalists ==
Gold	Silver	Bronze
Chris Brown; Bahamas	Tyler Christopher; Canada	Chris Lloyd; Dominica

== Results ==
=== Heats ===
Qualification: First 3 of each heat (Q) and the next 4 fastest (q) qualified for the semifinals.

Rank	Heat	Name	Nationality	Time	Notes
1	1	Chris Brown	Bahamas	45.12	Q
2	4	Avard Moncur	Bahamas	45.27	Q
3	1	Lionel Larry	United States	45.32	Q
4	1	Arismendy Peguero	Dominican Republic	45.34	Q, PB
5	4	Renny Quow	Trinidad and Tobago	45.35	Q, PB
6	1	William Collazo	Cuba	45.63	q, PB
7	2	Jamaal Torrance	United States	45.65	Q
8	2	Chris Lloyd	Dominica	45.83	Q
9	4	Leford Green	Jamaica	45.89	Q
10	3	Tyler Christopher	Canada	45.99	Q
11	3	Alleyne Francique	Grenada	46.05	Q
12	3	Ato Modibo	Trinidad and Tobago	46.25	Q
13	3	Carlos Santa	Dominican Republic	46.34	q
13	4	Félix Martínez	Puerto Rico	46.34	q
15	2	Omar Cisneros	Cuba	46.51	Q
16	4	Nathan Vadeboncoeur	Canada	46.76	q
17	1	Sanderlei Parrela	Brazil	46.85	
18	2	Edino Steele	Jamaica	47.12	
19	2	Anghelo Edmund	Panama	47.41	
20	3	Andrés Silva	Uruguay	47.73	
21	2	Rodrigo Bargas	Brazil	47.88	
22	1	Melville Rogers	Saint Kitts and Nevis	48.02	
23	2	Camilo Quevedo	Guatemala	49.19	
24	4	David Pierre	Haiti	49.26	
25	3	Charmant Ollivierre	Saint Vincent and the Grenadines	50.13	
	1	David Hamil	Cayman Islands	DNS	

=== Semifinals ===
Qualification: First 4 of each semifinal (Q) qualified directly for the final.

Rank	Heat	Name	Nationality	Time	Notes
1	2	Tyler Christopher	Canada	45.28	Q
2	2	Lionel Larry	United States	45.40	Q
3	2	Avard Moncur	Bahamas	45.44	Q
4	1	Chris Brown	Bahamas	45.51	Q
5	2	Alleyne Francique	Grenada	45.57	Q
6	1	Chris Lloyd	Dominica	45.63	Q
7	2	Renny Quow	Trinidad and Tobago	45.74	
8	1	William Collazo	Cuba	45.75	Q
8	1	Jamaal Torrance	United States	45.75	Q
10	1	Arismendy Peguero	Dominican Republic	45.75	
11	1	Ato Modibo	Trinidad and Tobago	46.42	
12	2	Félix Martínez	Puerto Rico	46.60	
13	2	Omar Cisneros	Cuba	46.62	
14	1	Leford Green	Jamaica	46.80	
15	1	Nathan Vadeboncoeur	Canada	47.39	
16	2	Carlos Santa	Dominican Republic	47.45	

=== Final ===
Rank	Lane	Name	Nationality	Time	Notes
1st place, gold medalist(s)	5	Chris Brown	Bahamas	44.85	SB
2nd place, silver medalist(s)	4	Tyler Christopher	Canada	45.05	
3rd place, bronze medalist(s)	6	Chris Lloyd	Dominica	45.40	
4	7	William Collazo	Cuba	45.45	PB
5	8	Alleyne Francique	Grenada	45.49	SB
6	2	Avard Moncur	Bahamas	45.51	
7	1	Jamaal Torrance	United States	46.05	
	3	Lionel Larry	United States	DNF	
