= Mark Ujakpor =

Spanish sprinter

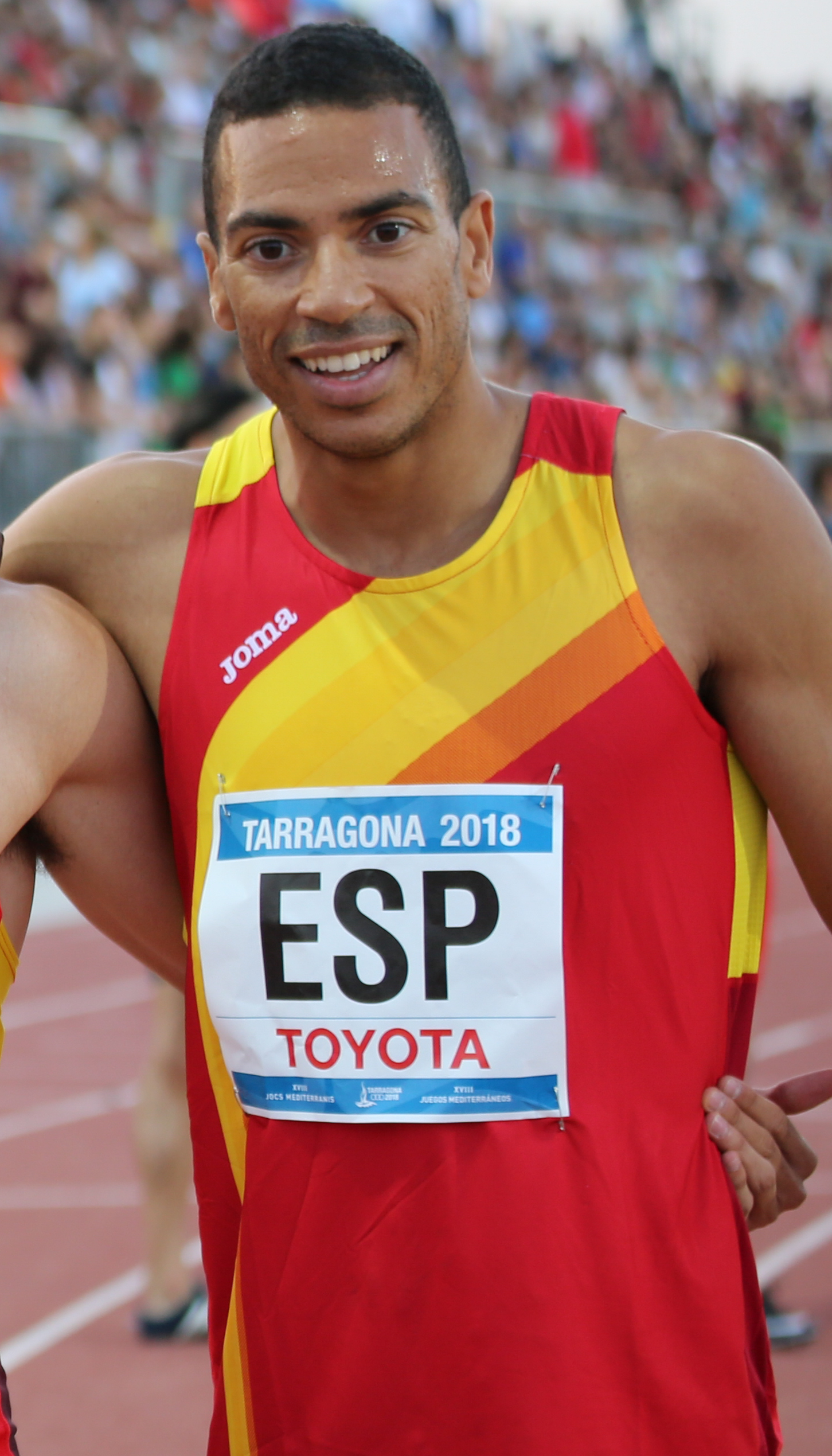
- Mark Ujakpor in 2018

Personal information
- Nationality: Spain
- Born: 18 January 1987 (age 39) Ceuta, Spain
- Height: 1.91 m (6 ft 3 in)
- Weight: 80 kg (176 lb)

Sport
- Sport: Athletics
- Event: 400 metres
- Club: Track Cross Road Team (TCR Team)

Sidney Mark Ujakpor Sánchez (born 18 January 1987 in Spain) is a Spanish athlete specializing in the 400 metres and 400 metres hurdles. His coach is David López Capapé, former 400 metres hurdler and orthopaedic surgeon.

He has a Nigerian father and a Spanish mother.

== Competition record ==
Year	Competition	Venue	Position	Event	Notes
Representing Spain
2005	European Junior Championships	Kaunas, Lithuania	15th (h)	4 × 400 m relay	3:16.00
2007	European U23 Championships	Debrecen, Hungary	–	400 m	DNF
2007	European U23 Championships	Debrecen, Hungary	7th	4 × 400 m relay	3:08.63
2008	World Indoor Championships	Valencia, Spain	20th (h)	400 m	47.94
2008	World Indoor Championships	Valencia, Spain	7th (h)	4 × 400 m relay	3:09.93
2009	European Indoor Championships	Turin, Italy	18th (h)	400 m	47.59
2009	Mediterranean Games	Pescara, Italy	7th	400 m	46.46
2009	Mediterranean Games	Pescara, Italy	1st	4 × 400 m relay	3:06.19
2009	European U23 Championships	Kaunas, Lithuania	15th (sf)	400 m	47.09
2009	European U23 Championships	Kaunas, Lithuania	5th	4 × 400 m relay	3:05.63
2010	Ibero-American Championships	San Fernando, Spain	11th (h)	400 m	47.37
2010	Ibero-American Championships	San Fernando, Spain	5th	4 × 400 m relay	3:08.46
2010	European Championships	Barcelona, Spain	24th (h)	400 m	46.85
2010	European Championships	Barcelona, Spain	12th (h)	4 × 400 m relay	3:07.38
2011	European Indoor Championships	Paris, France	10th (sf)	400 m	47.82
2012	World Indoor Championships	Istanbul, Turkey	10th (sf)	400 m	46.98
2012	World Indoor Championships	Istanbul, Turkey	5th	4 × 400 m relay	3:10.01
2012	European Championships	Helsinki, Finland	21st (sf)	400 m	47.27
2012	European Championships	Helsinki, Finland	10th (h)	4 × 400 m relay	3:09.11
2013	European Indoor Championships	Gothenburg, Sweden	16th (h)	400 m	47.89
2013	Mediterranean Games	Mersin, Turkey	5th	400 m	46.53
2014	World Indoor Championships	Sopot, Poland	18th (h)	400 m	47.16
2014	World Indoor Championships	Sopot, Poland	9th (h)	4 × 400 m relay	3:10.17
2014	European Championships	Zürich, Switzerland	9th (h)	4 × 400 m relay	3:04.68
2015	IAAF World Relays	Nassau, Bahamas	22nd (h)	4 × 400 m relay	3:08.49
2016	Ibero-American Championships	Rio de Janeiro, Brazil	3rd	400 m hurdles	49.65
2016	European Championships	Amsterdam, Netherlands	–	400 m hurdles	DNF
2018	Mediterranean Games	Tarragona, Spain	8th	400 m hurdles	51.23
2018	Mediterranean Games	Tarragona, Spain	2nd	4 × 400 m relay	3:04.71
2018	European Championships	Berlin, Germany	3rd	4 × 400 m relay	3:04.62 (Note: Did not run the final; time from the heats.)

== Personal bests ==
Outdoor

- 400 metres – 46.15 (Madrid 2014)
- 400 metres hurdles - 49.65 (Rio de Janeiro 2016)

Indoor

- 400 metres – 46.49 (Sabadell 2012)
