= Athletics at the 2009 Summer Universiade – Men's 400 metres =

Athletic Competition

The men's 400 metres event at the 2009 Summer Universiade was held on 7–9 July.

== Medalists ==
| Gold | Silver | Bronze |
|---|---|---|
| Yuzo Kanemaru; Japan | Clemens Zeller; Austria | Daniel Harper; Canada |

== Results ==
=== Heats ===
Qualification: First 2 of each heat (Q) and the next 8 fastest (q) qualified for the semifinals.

| Rank | Heat | Name | Nationality | Time | Notes |
|---|---|---|---|---|---|
| 1 | 5 | Yuzo Kanemaru | Japan | 46.51 | Q |
| 2 | 4 | Kacper Kozłowski | Poland | 46.55 | Q |
| 3 | 4 | Clay Watkins | Australia | 46.56 | Q |
| 4 | 4 | Hideyuki Hirose | Japan | 46.65 | q |
| 5 | 6 | Clemens Zeller | Austria | 46.86 | Q |
| 6 | 4 | Sibusiso Sishi | South Africa | 47.01 | q |
| 7 | 6 | Peter Znava | Slovakia | 47.14 | Q |
| 8 | 1 | Arnaud Ghislain | Belgium | 47.16 | Q |
| 9 | 1 | Nathan Vadeboncoeur | Canada | 47.20 | Q |
| 10 | 5 | Fayçal Cherifi | Algeria | 47.25 | Q |
| 11 | 5 | Artem Sergeenkov | Russia | 47.26 | q, SB |
| 12 | 3 | Nils Duerinck | Belgium | 47.28 | Q |
| 13 | 2 | Daniel Harper | Canada | 47.32 | Q |
| 14 | 6 | Aleksander Sigalovskiy | Russia | 47.35 | q, SB |
| 15 | 8 | Takeshi Fujiwara | El Salvador | 47.40 | Q |
| 16 | 3 | Pieter Smith | South Africa | 47.47 | Q |
| 17 | 3 | Miloud Rahmani | Algeria | 47.48 | q |
| 18 | 2 | Andrew Moore | New Zealand | 47.52 | Q |
| 19 | 8 | Joāo Ferreira | Portugal | 47.56 | Q |
| 19 | 2 | Marco Vistalli | Italy | 47.56 | q |
| 21 | 8 | Petr Szetei | Czech Republic | 47.63 | q, PB |
| 22 | 8 | Pantelis Melahrinoudis | Greece | 47.66 | q |
| 23 | 6 | Ali Ekber Kayaş | Turkey | 47.68 | |
| 24 | 8 | Emmanuel Tugumisirize | Uganda | 47.80 | PB |
| 25 | 5 | You Cheng | China | 47.93 | |
| 26 | 2 | Marouane El Madadi | Morocco | 47.96 | |
| 26 | 3 | Jarosław Wasiak | Poland | 47.96 | |
| 28 | 7 | Chris Troode | Australia | 48.08 | Q |
| 29 | 1 | Riis Jacob Fabricius | Denmark | 48.16 | |
| 30 | 4 | Gary Robinson | Costa Rica | 48.51 | SB |
| 31 | 2 | Henri Sool | Estonia | 48.53 | |
| 32 | 5 | Krasimir Braikov | Bulgaria | 48.57 | |
| 33 | 5 | Miloš Simović | Serbia | 48.67 | |
| 34 | 1 | Robert Muci | Serbia | 48.75 | |
| 35 | 7 | Domenico Fontana | Italy | 48.99 | Q |
| 36 | 7 | Bernard Adams | Ghana | 49.33 | |
| 37 | 3 | Ali Hazer | Lebanon | 49.41 | |
| 38 | 6 | Chang Pengben | China | 49.48 | |
| 39 | 7 | Muhammad Nabeel | Pakistan | 49.60 | |
| 40 | 2 | Nejc Radojčič | Slovenia | 49.85 | |
| 41 | 6 | Thapelo Ketlogetswe | Botswana | 50.37 | |
| 42 | 7 | Aymar Oboba Fleury | Republic of the Congo | 50.38 | |
| 43 | 1 | Boris Suslovski | Bosnia and Herzegovina | 50.41 | |
| 44 | 4 | Stefan Bečanović | Montenegro | 51.17 | |
| 45 | 8 | Hammam Al-Farsi | Oman | 51.23 | |
| 46 | 5 | Stevan Kosorić | Bosnia and Herzegovina | 51.31 | |
| 47 | 8 | Dritan Musta | Albania | 52.47 | |
| 48 | 1 | Said Al-Katheri | Oman | 55.15 | |
| 49 | 6 | Chan Chon In | Macau | 55.24 | |
| 50 | 3 | Fahad Ahmadm Al-Furhood | Saudi Arabia | 1:08.23 | |
| | 2 | Sulaiman Khalafs Al-Dowaighri | Saudi Arabia | DNF | |
| | 1 | Dmitry Pedan | Kyrgyzstan | DNS | |
| | 4 | Daniel Christensen | Denmark | DNS | |
| | 6 | Charles Shaw | Liberia | DNS | |
| | 7 | Bob Niamali | Democratic Republic of the Congo | DNS | |
| | 7 | Ehsan Tahmasebi | Iran | DNS | |
| | 8 | Adeleye Ogunmakinju | Nigeria | DNS | |

=== Semifinals ===
Qualification: First 2 of each semifinal (Q) and the next 2 fastest (q) qualified for the finals.

| Rank | Heat | Name | Nationality | Time | Notes |
|---|---|---|---|---|---|
| 1 | 2 | Chris Troode | Australia | 45.79 | Q, SB |
| 2 | 3 | Clemens Zeller | Austria | 46.33 | Q |
| 3 | 2 | Kacper Kozłowski | Poland | 46.40 | Q |
| 4 | 1 | Yuzo Kanemaru | Japan | 46.48 | Q |
| 5 | 2 | Petr Szetei | Czech Republic | 46.58 | q, PB |
| 6 | 3 | Marco Vistalli | Italy | 46.64 | Q, PB |
| 7 | 3 | Arnaud Ghislain | Belgium | 46.81 | q |
| 8 | 2 | Hideyuki Hirose | Japan | 46.84 | |
| 9 | 1 | Daniel Harper | Canada | 46.93 | Q |
| 10 | 1 | Sibusiso Sishi | South Africa | 46.98 | |
| 11 | 2 | Nathan Vadeboncoeur | Canada | 46.99 | |
| 12 | 3 | Clay Watkins | Australia | 47.04 | |
| 13 | 3 | Peter Znava | Slovakia | 47.18 | |
| 14 | 2 | Nils Duerinck | Belgium | 47.24 | |
| 15 | 3 | Miloud Rahmani | Algeria | 47.26 | |
| 16 | 2 | Andrew Moore | New Zealand | 47.36 | |
| 17 | 1 | Takeshi Fujiwara | El Salvador | 47.43 | |
| 18 | 1 | Domenico Fontana | Italy | 47.45 | PB |
| 19 | 1 | Artem Sergeenkov | Russia | 47.61 | |
| 20 | 1 | Pantelis Melahrinoudis | Greece | 47.64 | |
| 21 | 3 | Pieter Smith | South Africa | 47.67 | |
| 22 | 1 | Fayçal Cherifi | Algeria | 47.88 | |
| 23 | 2 | Aleksander Sigalovskiy | Russia | 48.04 | |
| 24 | 3 | Joāo Ferreira | Portugal | 48.22 | |

=== Final ===
| Rank | Lane | Name | Nationality | Time | Notes |
|---|---|---|---|---|---|
| 1st place, gold medalist(s) | 4 | Yuzo Kanemaru | Japan | 45.68 | |
| 2nd place, silver medalist(s) | 5 | Clemens Zeller | Austria | 46.12 | SB |
| 3rd place, bronze medalist(s) | 7 | Daniel Harper | Canada | 46.22 | PB |
| 4 | 3 | Kacper Kozłowski | Poland | 46.27 | |
| 5 | 2 | Petr Szetei | Czech Republic | 46.84 | |
| 6 | 1 | Arnaud Ghislain | Belgium | 47.15 | |
| | 8 | Marco Vistalli | Italy | DQ | |
| | 6 | Chris Troode | Australia | DNS | |
