= Andrés Silva =

Uruguayan track athlete (born 1986)

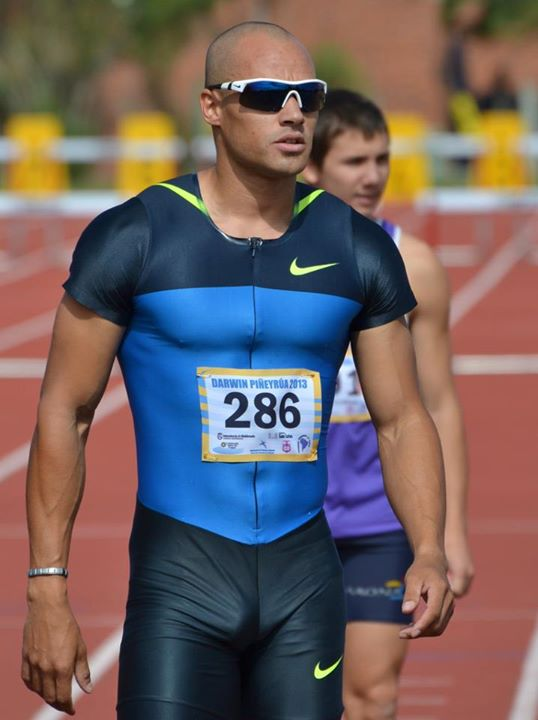

Personal information
- Full name: Andrés Bayron Silva Lemos
- Nationality: Uruguay
- Born: 27 March 1986 (age 40) Tacuarembó, Tacuarembó, Uruguay
- Height: 1.80 m (5 ft 11 in)
- Weight: 75 kg (165 lb)

Sport
- Sport: Track and field
- Events: 400 metres, 400 metres hurdles, decathlon

Achievements and titles
- Personal bests: 400 m: 45.02 s (Fortaleza 2011); 400 m H: 49.16 s (Rio de Janeiro 2011)
Medal record
Men's athletics
Representing Uruguay
South American Championships
| Gold medal – first place | 2005 Cali | 400 m |
| Gold medal – first place | 2007 São Paulo | 400 m |
| Gold medal – first place | 2009 Lima | 400 m |
| Gold medal – first place | 2009 Lima | 400 m hurdles |
| Gold medal – first place | 2011 Buenos Aires | 400 m hurdles |
| Gold medal – first place | 2014 Santiago | 400 m hurdles |
| Silver medal – second place | 2013 Cartagena | 400 m hurdles |
Ibero-American Championships
| Silver medal – second place | 2010 San Fernando | 400 m hurdles |
Pan American Junior Championships
| Gold medal – first place | 2005 Windsor | Decathlon |
World Youth Championships
| Gold medal – first place | 2003 Sherbrooke | Octathlon |
South American Youth Championships
| Gold medal – first place | 2002 Asunción | Octathlon |
| Silver medal – second place | 2002 Asunción | 110 m hurdles |
- Updated on 23 January 2015

Andrés Bayron Silva Lemos (born 27 March 1986 in Tacuarembó) is a Uruguayan track athlete. He competed in the combined events on the youth and junior levels, but has since specialized in the 400 metres and 400 metres hurdles.

Silva participated in the 400 metres at the 2004 and 2008 Olympics, and 400 metres hurdles at the 2012 and 2016 Summer Olympics.

He was Uruguay's flagbearer at the 2007 Pan American Games.

He tested positive for 6-oxo-androstene in an out-of-competition test in June 2015 and was banned for a period of six months, which included his missing the 2015 World Championships in Athletics.

== Personal bests ==
| Event | Result | Venue | Date |
Outdoor
| 100 m | 10.40 s (wind: +1.6 m/s) | San Carlos, Uruguay | 29 March 2006 |
| 200 m | 20.80 s (wind: -0.3 m/s) | Montevideo, Uruguay | 2 April 2006 |
| 400 m | 45.02 s | Fortaleza, Brazil | 17 May 2006 |
| 800 m | 1:50.98 min | Santiago, Chile | 26 April 2003 |
| 1500 m | 4:14.85 min | Rosario, Argentina | 5 June 2005 |
| 110 m hurdles | 14.93 s (wind: -0.2 m/s) | Montevideo, Uruguay | 16 April 2004 |
| 400 m hurdles | 48.65 s | São Paulo, Brazil | 2 August 2014 |
| High jump | 1.91 m | Rosario, Argentina | 4 June 2005 |
| Pole vault | 4.45 m | Rosario, Argentina | 9 October 2004 |
| Long jump | 7.59 m (wind: -0.9 m/s) A | Cochabamba, Bolivia | 4 June 2006 |
| Javelin throw | 52.02 m | Windsor, Canada | 30 July 2005 |
Indoor
| 400 m | 47.50 s | Moscow, Russia | 10 March 2006 |

== Competition record ==
| Year | Competition | Venue | Position | Event | Notes |
Representing Uruguay
| 2002 | World Junior Championships | Kingston, Jamaica | 26th (h) | 400 m | 48.14 |
| 2002 | South American Junior Championships / South American Games | Belém, Brazil | 5th | 200 m | 21.63 (+1.1 m/s) |
| 2002 | South American Junior Championships / South American Games | Belém, Brazil | 6th | 200 m | 21.63 (+1.1 m/s) |
| 2002 | South American Junior Championships / South American Games | Belém, Brazil | 3rd | 400 m | 47.50 |
| 2002 | South American Youth Championships | Asunción, Paraguay | 2nd | 110 m hurdles | 14.26 s (-1.9 m/s) |
| 2002 | South American Youth Championships | Asunción, Paraguay | 1st | Octathlon | 5928 pts |
| 2002 | South American Youth Championships | Asunción, Paraguay | 4th | 800m Medley relay (100m x 100m x 200m x 400m) | 1:58.06 |
| 2003 | South American Junior Championships | Guayaquil, Ecuador | 3rd | 200 m | 21.45 |
| 2003 | South American Junior Championships | Guayaquil, Ecuador | 1st | 400 m | 46.54 |
| 2003 | South American Championships | Barquisimeto, Venezuela | 4th | 400 m | 46.23 |
| 2003 | World Youth Championships | Sherbrooke, Canada | 1st | Octathlon | 6456 pts WJR |
| 2004 | South American U23 Championships | Barquisimeto, Venezuela | 1st | 400 m | 45.80 (NR) |
| 2004 | World Junior Championships | Grosseto, Italy | 5th | Decathlon (junior) | 7542 pts |
| 2004 | Ibero-American Championships | Huelva, Spain | 6th | 400 m | 46.63 |
| 2004 | Olympic Games | Athens, Greece | 42nd (h) | 400 m | 46.48 |
| 2005 | South American Championships | Cali, Colombia | 1st | 400 m | 45.38 |
| 2005 | Pan American Junior Championships | Windsor, Canada | 1st | Decathlon | 7641 pts |
| 2005 | South American Junior Championships | Rosario, Argentina | 2nd | 400 m | 47.84 |
| 2005 | South American Junior Championships | Rosario, Argentina | 6th | 4 × 100 m relay | 42.42 |
| 2005 | South American Junior Championships | Rosario, Argentina | 5th | 4 × 400 m relay | 3:19.35 |
| 2006 | World Indoor Championships | Moscow, Russia | 18th (h) | 400 m | 47.50 (iNR) |
| 2006 | Ibero-American Championships | Ponce, Puerto Rico | 1st | 400 m | 45.35 |
| 2006 | South American U23 Championships / South American Games | Buenos Aires, Argentina | 1st | 400 m | 46.69 |
| 2006 | South American U23 Championships / South American Games | Buenos Aires, Argentina | 1st | 400 m hurdles | 50.46 (NR) |
| 2007 | South American Championships | São Paulo, Brazil | 1st | 400 m | 45.89 |
| 2007 | Pan American Games | Rio de Janeiro, Brazil | 20th (h) | 400 m | 47.73 |
| 2007 | Pan American Games | Rio de Janeiro, Brazil | 12th (h) | 400 m hurdles | 50.60 |
| 2007 | World Championships | Osaka, Japan | 43rd (h) | 400 m | 46.79 |
| 2008 | World Indoor Championships | Valencia, Spain | 18th (h) | 400 m | 47.54 |
| 2008 | Olympic Games | Beijing, China | 41st (h) | 400 m | 46.34 |
| 2008 | South American U23 Championships | Lima, Peru | 1st | 400 m | 46.73 |
| 2008 | South American U23 Championships | Lima, Peru | 1st | 400 m hurdles | 51.33 |
| 2009 | South American Championships | Lima, Peru | 1st | 400 m | 46.06 |
| 2009 | South American Championships | Lima, Peru | 1st | 400 m hurdles | 50.28 |
| 2009 | World Championships | Berlin, Germany | 40th (h) | 400 m | 46.86 |
| 2009 | World Championships | Berlin, Germany | 13th (sf) | 400 m hurdles | 49.34 (NR) |
| 2010 | World Indoor Championships | Doha, Qatar | 24th (h) | 400 m | 49.09 |
| 2010 | Ibero-American Championships | San Fernando, Spain | 2nd | 400 m hurdles | 49.58 |
| 2011 | South American Championships | Buenos Aires, Argentina | 1st | 400 m hurdles | 49.94 |
| 2011 | World Championships | Daegu, South Korea | 16th (h) | 400 m hurdles | 49.63 |
| 2011 | Pan American Games | Guadalajara, Mexico | – | 400 m hurdles | DNF |
| 2012 | World Indoor Championships | Istanbul, Turkey | 29th (h) | 400 m | 51.93 |
| 2012 | Ibero-American Championships | Barquisimeto, Venezuela | 7th | 400 m hurdles | 51.68 |
| 2012 | Olympic Games | London, United Kingdom | 45th (h) | 400 m hurdles | 53.38 |
| 2013 | South American Championships | Cartagena, Colombia | 2nd | 400 m hurdles | 50.52 |
| 2013 | World Championships | Moscow, Russia | 28th (h) | 400 m hurdles | 50.48 |
| 2014 | South American Games | Santiago, Chile | 1st | 400 m hurdles | 49.57 |
| 2014 | Ibero-American Championships | São Paulo, Brazil | 1st | 400 m hurdles | 48.65 (CR, NR) |
| 2014 | Pan American Sports Festival | Mexico City, Mexico | 3rd | 400m hurdles | 49.08 A |
| 2015 | South American Championships | Lima, Peru | 1st | 400 m hurdles | 49.43 |
| 2016 | Ibero-American Championships | Rio de Janeiro, Brazil | 1st | 400 m hurdles | 49.48 |
| 2016 | Olympic Games | Rio de Janeiro, Brazil | 20th (sf) | 400 m hurdles | 49.75 |
| 2017 | South American Championships | Asunción, Paraguay | 4th | 400 m hurdles | 50.58 |
| 2018 | South American Games | Cochabamba, Bolivia | 4th | 400 m hurdles | 50.29 |
| 2019 | South American Championships | Lima, Peru | 4th | 400 m hurdles | 50.73 |
| 2021 | South American Championships | Guayaquil, Ecuador | 3rd | 400 m hurdles | 51.42 |
