= Tyler Christopher (athlete) =

Canadian sprinter (born 1983)

Personal information
- Born: October 3, 1983 (age 43) Chilliwack, British Columbia, Canada
Medal record
Men's Athletics
Representing Canada
World Championships
Bronze medal – third place	2005 Helsinki	400 m
World Indoor Championships
Gold medal – first place	2008 Valencia	400 m
Pan American Games
Silver medal – second place	2007 Rio de Janeiro	400 m

Tyler Christopher (born October 3, 1983, in Chilliwack, British Columbia) is a former Canadian sprinter who specialized in 400 metres. He is the former Canadian record holder for the distance in outdoor competition.

In 2004, he won the NACAC U23 Championships. The following year he competed in 400 metres at the World Championships in Helsinki and won a bronze medal, setting a new national record of 44.44 seconds. His personal best in the 200 metres event is 20.49 s, also achieved in 2005.

Christopher's return to the World Championships in 2007 saw him finish sixth in the 400 m. At the 2007 Pan American Games in Rio de Janeiro, Brazil, he won the silver medal in 45.05 s behind Chris Brown of the Bahamas. The race was marred by a controversial start whereas Christopher thought there was a false start, and he slowed to nearly a dead-stop at the beginning of the race.

He was awarded by Athletics Canada the Jack W. Davies trophy as the 2005 outstanding overall athlete and the Phil A. Edwards Memorial trophy as the top athlete in track events.

On March 9, 2008, Tyler won the men's 400 metres title at the 2008 IAAF World Indoor Championships in Valencia, Spain with a Canadian-record time of 45.67 s.

Christopher's coach, Kevin Tyler is also an accomplished athlete. He finished fifth at the Canadian Track and Field Championships in the 400 m, has won the World Wheelbarrow championship in Ladner, B.C and was the brake man for the 1988 Canadian Olympic bobsled team.

At the 2008 Beijing Olympics Christopher ran a disappointing 45.67 s, finishing fifth in his heat and not qualifying for the semi-finals. In an interview with CBC reporter Elliot Friedman after the race Christopher attributed his poor performance to the flu, which had prevented him from training in the days prior to the qualifying event.

He retired from sprinting in 2011.

== Personal bests ==
Last updated April 19, 2009

Event	Time (seconds)	Venue	Date
60 metres	6.70	Winnipeg, Manitoba, Canada	February 2, 2008
150 metres	15.17	Sainte Anne, Quebec, Canada	May 20, 2004
200 metres	20.49	Claremont, California, United States	April 15, 2005
300 metres	31.77	Sainte Anne, Quebec, Canada	May 20, 2004
400 metres	44.44	Helsinki, Finland	August 20, 2005
400 metres (indoor)	45.67	Valencia, Spain	March 9, 2008

- All information from IAAF Profile

== See also ==
- Canadian records in track and field
