= Maksim Dyldin =

Russian sprinter

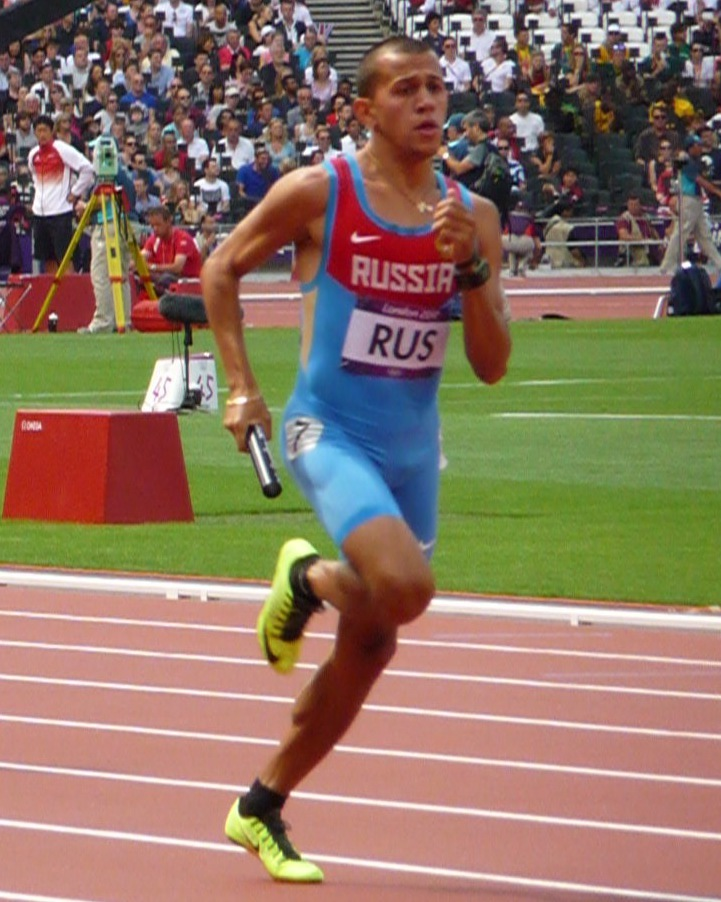

Personal information
- Born: May 19, 1987 (age 39) Perm
- Height: 1.78 m (5 ft 10 in)
- Weight: 68 kg (150 lb)

Sport
- Country: Russia
- Sport: Athletics
- Event: 4 × 400 m Relay
Medal record
Olympic Games
Disqualified	2008 Beijing	4 × 400 m relay
World Championships
Disqualified	2013 Moscow	4 × 400 m relay
European Championships
Gold medal – first place	2010 Barcelona	4 × 400 m relay
Disqualified	2014 Zürich	4 × 400 m relay
European Indoor Championships
Silver medal – second place	2007 Birmingham	4 × 400 m relay

Maksim Sergeyevich Dyldin (Russian: Максим Серге́евич Дылдин; born 19 May 1987) is a Russian sprint athlete. He was part of the team that finished third in Men's 4 × 400 m relay at the 2008 Summer Olympics, but the team was disqualified after teammate Denis Alekseyev tested positive for doping.

Dyldin himself was disqualified for four years for refusing to be tested. His ban extends from 22 May 2015 to 5 January 2021.

== See also ==
- List of doping cases in athletics
- List of stripped European Athletics Championships medals
- List of World Athletics Championships medalists (men)
- 4 × 400 metres relay at the World Championships in Athletics
