= David Gillick =

Irish international track and field athlete

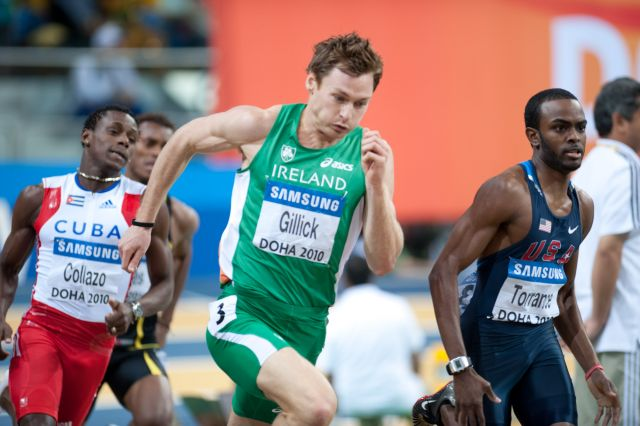
- David Gillick (middle) during the 2010 IAAF World Indoor Championships

Personal information
- Nickname: Gilly
- National team: Ireland
- Citizenship: Irish
- Born: 9 July 1983 (age 43) Ballinteer, Dublin, Ireland
- Education: St. Benildus College; Technological University Dublin
- Occupation: Track and field athlete
- Years active: 2003-2013, 2016-present
- Spouse: Charlotte Gillick (m. 2014)
- Website: www.davidgillick.com

Sport
- Country: Ireland
- Sport: Track and field
- Coached by: Nick Dakin
- Updated on 13 March 2017

David Gillick
Medal record

Men's Athletics

Representing Ireland

World Indoor Championship
Bronze medal – third place	2004 Budapest	4 × 400 metre relay

European Indoor Championships
Gold medal – first place	2005 Madrid	400 m
Gold medal – first place	2007 Birmingham	400 m

David Gillick (born 9 July 1983, in Dublin) is an Irish international track and field athlete. He began his education in Our Lady's Boys School and attended St Benildus College secondary school in Kilmacud. He studied at Dublin Institute of Technology before moving to Loughborough University in the United Kingdom to train as a full-time athlete with coach Nick Dakin. Gillick specialises in the 400 metres and he won the European Indoor Championship in 2005 and 2007, as well as the Irish National Outdoor Championship in 2006 and 2007. He set the Irish Indoor record of 45.52 seconds in the 2007 final. The time also beat the Irish outdoor record of 45.58 and was within the Olympic 'A' qualifying standard for the 2008 Games. On 4 July 2009 he ran 44.77 seconds in a race in Madrid to set a new national record. He is also the 2009 Irish national 200 m champion.

== Career ==
Gillick first ran for Ireland at the European Athletics U23 Championships in 2003, however it was not a successful international debut for Gillick. At the 2004 IAAF World Indoor Championships Gillick won a bronze medal as part of the Irish 4 × 400 metres relay team (along with Robert Daly, David McCarthy and Gary Ryan). Despite improving his personal best, Gillick did not qualify for the 2004 Summer Olympics.

When he was young he lived in Ballinteer and played football for Ballinteer St John's GAA Club. He was educated at Our Lady's National School in Ballinteer and then St Benildus College, Kilmacud.

In the 2005 European Indoor Championships Gillick produced two outstanding runs to first win his heat and then win the gold medal in a personal best time of 46.30, beating the favourite, Spain's David Canal, into second place. It was Ireland's first gold medal in a sprinting event in 75 years. Injury forced Gillick to miss the 2005 World outdoor Championships.

In 2006, Gillick again suffered an injury hit season but did win the Irish National 400 m Championship in a time of 45.67. He also won the Irish National Indoor 200 m Championship (21.45). He qualified with ease through the first round at the 2006 European Championships before running poorly in his semi-final and being eliminated.

In October 2006, Gillick became a full-time athlete and relocated to Loughborough in the English midlands to link up with English 400 m coach Nick Dakin and a group that included a number of top British 400 m athletes. Loughborough University has a great tradition in athletics and is viewed by many as one of Europe's top sporting universities.

Early in 2007, Gillick ran a time of 45.91 at an indoor meeting in Düsseldorf, a performance which made him the world leader over 400 m indoors and bettered the Irish record, previously held by Belfast's Paul McKee. In March 2007, he successfully defended his European Indoor title, running a new Irish record of 45.52.

On 4 July 2009 Gillick won at the Meeting de Madrid, which is part of the IAAF World Athletics Tour. His time of 44.77 sliced a significant amount off his previous Irish record of 45.12 to set a new Irish outdoor record. He followed this up with 2nd place (44.82) at the Golden League meet in Rome. At the World Athletics Championships in Berlin in August 2009, Gillick qualified for the semi-finals of the men's 400 m after he finished second in his heat in a time of 45.54. In the semi-final Gillick placed fourth in a time of 44.88, which was good enough to make the World Championship final as the second fastest loser. In the final he finished 6th in a time of 45.53.

Gillick followed up with two good runs in the 2009 IAAF Golden League meetings in Zurich and Brussels. He finished fourth in 45.25 behind world champion LaShawn Merritt in the Weltklasse. A week later, he finished fourth in 45.73 behind Jeremy Wariner in Brussels. Gillick finished the Golden League series with 30 points and finished in fourth position.

In the 2010 IAAF World Indoor Championships Gillick was the second fastest qualifier in both the heats and semi-finals but finished 5th in the final and was later disqualified as a result of a collision with the American Bershawn Jackson with 200 metres to go. At the European outdoors that year he became the first Irishman to reach the final of the 400 m where he again finished 5th.

== Other ==
In 2013, he competed in Celebrity MasterChef Ireland and won the competition.

== Major Medals (3) ==
- 2004 World Indoor Championship (Budapest)

Bronze - 4 × 400 metres relay (3:10.44)

- 2005 European Indoor Championships (Madrid)

Gold - 400 metres (46.30)

- 2007 European Indoor Championships (Birmingham)

Gold - 400 metres (45.52 NR, EL)

== Performance at major championships ==
Year	Competition	Venue	Position	Event	Notes
Representing Ireland
2002	World Junior Championships	Kingston, Jamaica	14th (h)	4 × 400 m relay	3:13.45
2003	European U23 Championships	Bydgoszcz, Poland	23rd (h)	400 m	47.67
2009	World Athletics Championships	Berlin, Germany	6th	400 m	45.53
2010	World Indoor Championships	Doha, Qatar	—	400 m	DQ
2010	European Athletics Championships	Barcelona, Spain	5th	400 m	45.28

== Records (1) ==
- National records:
  - 400 m outdoor: 44.77 (4/7/2009 in Madrid, Spain)
  - 400 m indoor: 45.52 (5/3/2007 in Birmingham, England), (20/2/2010 in Birmingham, England)

== See also ==
- Ireland at the 2006 European Championships in Athletics
- Ireland at the 2009 World Championships in Athletics
