= Chris Brown (sprinter) =

Bahamian sprinter (born 1978)

Chris Brown OLY
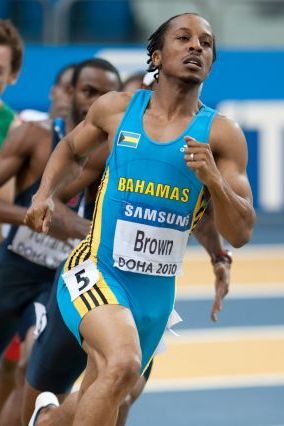
- Brown at the 2010 World Indoor Championships

Personal information
- Born: 15 October 1978 (age 48)
- Height: 1.78 m (5 ft 10 in)
- Weight: 75 kg (165 lb)

Sport
- Country: Bahamas
- Sport: Athletics
- Events: 400 metres, 4 × 400 m Relay

Achievements and titles
- Personal bests: 55 m: 6.53; 100 m: 10.26; 150 m: 15.10 NR; 200 m: 20.58; 300 m: 31.99 NR; 400 m: 44.40; 500 m: 1:03.67; 800 m: 1:49.54 NR
Medal record
Olympic Games
| Gold medal – first place | 2012 London | 4 × 400 m relay |
| Silver medal – second place | 2008 Beijing | 4 × 400 m relay |
| Bronze medal – third place | 2000 Sydney | 4 × 400 m relay |
| Bronze medal – third place | 2016 Rio de Janeiro | 4 × 400 m relay |
World Championships
| Gold medal – first place | 2001 Edmonton | 4 × 400 m relay |
| Silver medal – second place | 2005 Helsinki | 4 × 400 m relay |
| Silver medal – second place | 2007 Osaka | 4 × 400 m relay |
| Bronze medal – third place | 2003 Paris | 4 × 400 m relay |
World Indoor Championships
| Gold medal – first place | 2010 Doha | 400 m |
| Silver medal – second place | 2014 Sopot | 400 m |
| Silver medal – second place | 2016 Portland | 4 × 400 m relay |
| Bronze medal – third place | 2006 Moscow | 400 m |
| Bronze medal – third place | 2008 Valencia | 400 m |
| Bronze medal – third place | 2012 Istanbul | 400 m |
World Relay Championships
| Silver medal – second place | 2014 Nassau | 4 × 400 m relay |
| Silver medal – second place | 2015 Nassau | 4 × 400 m relay |
Commonwealth Games
| Silver medal – second place | 2014 Glasgow | 4 × 400 m relay |
| Bronze medal – third place | 2002 Manchester | 4 × 400 m relay |
Pan American Games
| Gold medal – first place | 2007 Rio de Janeiro | 400 m |
| Gold medal – first place | 2007 Rio de Janeiro | 4 × 400 m relay |
CAC Championships
| Gold medal – first place | 2003 St George's | 4 × 400 m relay |
| Gold medal – first place | 2005 Nassau | 4 × 400 m relay |
| Silver medal – second place | 2003 St George's | 400 m |
| Bronze medal – third place | 2005 Nassau | 400 m |
World / Continental Cup
| Silver medal – second place | 2006 Athens | 4 × 400 m relay |
| Bronze medal – third place | 2014 Marrakesh | 4 × 400 m relay |
CARIFTA Games Junior (U20)
| Bronze medal – third place | 1997 Bridgetown | 400 m |
| Bronze medal – third place | 1997 Bridgetown | 800 m |

Christopher Devon "Chris" Brown OLY (born 15 October 1978), also known as "Fireman", is a Bahamian track and field athlete from the Bahamian island of Eleuthera, who mainly competes in the 400 m. In addition to winning medals in individual contests, he has also won four World Championships medals in the relay. He also won a gold medal in the relay at the 2012 London Olympic Games. He is an alumnus of Norfolk State University.

In 2005 he finished fourth in the 400 m final at the World Championships. Also took a silver medal in the 4 × 400 m relay a few days later.

In 2007, his most successful year, Brown won gold medals in both the individual 400 m and the 4 × 400 m relay at the 2007 Pan American Games. In the 2007 World Championships in Osaka, Brown tied the Bahamian national record, when finishing fourth in the 400 m final. Brown (together with Avard Moncur, Andrae Williams and Michael Mathieu) also won silver in the 4 × 400 m relay at the 2007 World Championships.

In 2008 at the Beijing Olympics he placed fourth in the 400 m final when he was initially in 3rd place, American runner David Neville dived across the line just ahead of him. He lost the bronze by 0.04 seconds. A few days later he picked up a silver medal in the 4 × 400 m relay along with Andretti Bain, Michael Mathieu and Andrae Williams.

In 2012, Brown finished third in the 400 m finals at the World Indoor Championships behind countryman Demetrius Pinder. He once again finished fourth in the Olympic 400 m final. He won his first Olympic gold medal four days later in the 4 × 400 m relay with Demetrius Pinder, Michael Mathieu and Ramon Miller, They beat the defending champions the United States, marking the first Olympic men's gold medal in any athletics event for the Bahamas and the first American loss in that race at the Olympics since 1972.

At both the 2014 and 2015 IAAF World Relays held in his home country of The Bahamas he was part of the silver medal-winning 4 × 400 men's relay team.

On 22 August 2012 the Bahamian government named a street in his honor in his hometown of Wemyss Bight, Eleuthera.

Olympic Games
| Preceded by Debbie Ferguson-McKenzie | Flagbearer for Bahamas; London 2012 | Succeeded by Shaunae Miller |
