= Andrea Barberi =

Italian sprinter (1979–2023)

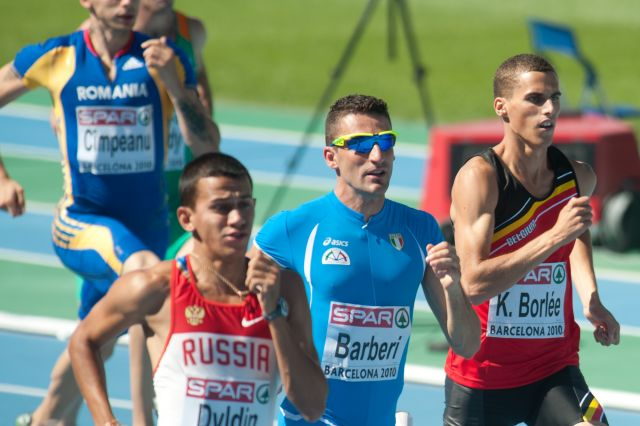
- Barberi (centre with glasses) in 2010

Personal information
- National team: Italy
- Born: 15 January 1979 Tivoli, Lazio, Italy
- Died: December 2023 (aged 44) Tivoli, Lazio, Italy
- Height: 1.78 m (5 ft 10 in)
- Weight: 72 kg (159 lb)

Sport
- Sport: Athletics
- Event: 400 metres

Achievements and titles
- Personal best: 400 m: 45.19 (2006)

Andrea Barberi (15 January 1979 – December 2023) was an Italian sprint athlete who specialised in the 400 metres.

== Biography ==
Barberi finished fifth at the 2006 European Athletics Championships and at the 2007 European Athletics Indoor Championships. He also reached the semi-finals of the 2005 World Athletics Championships. At the 2006 IAAF World Cup, he finished fifth in 4 x 400 metres relay with the European team.

On 27 August 2006 in Rieti, he ran in 45.19 seconds, breaking the Italian outdoor record which had stood since 1981.

The Italian Athletics Federation announced Barberi's death on 20 December 2023. He was 44.

== National titles ==
Barberi won at the individual Italian Athletics Championships nine times:

- 400 metres (2001, 2002, 2003, 2004, 2005, 2006, 2007, 2008 (Note: ex aequo with Luca Galletti)
- 400 metres indoor (2004)

== See also ==
- Italian all-time lists - 400 metres
- Italy national relay team
