= Johan Wissman =

Swedish sprinter

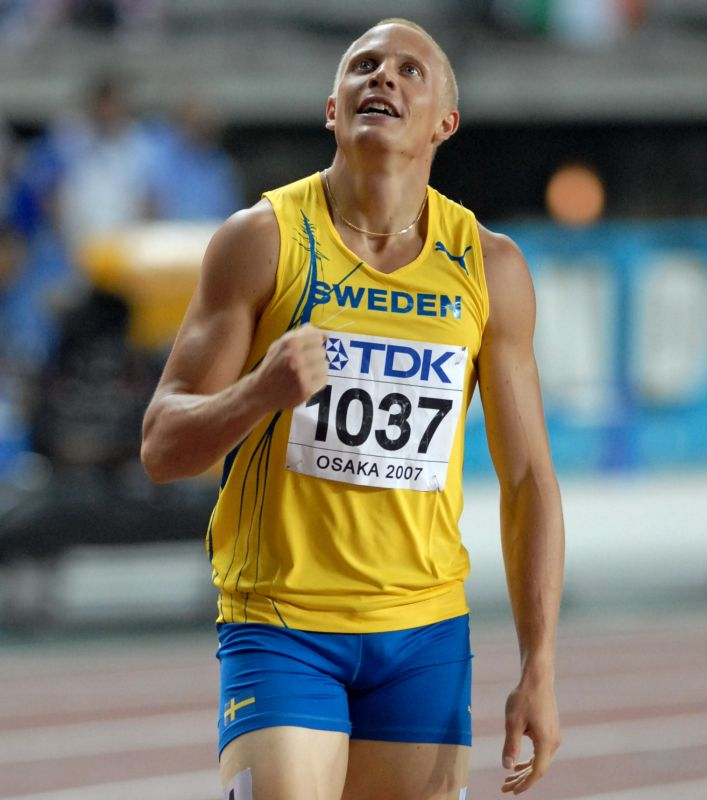
- Johan Wissman in 2007

Personal information
- Nationality: Sweden
- Born: 2 November 1982 (age 44) Helsingborg, Sweden
- Height: 1.80 m (5 ft 11 in)
- Weight: 75 kg (165 lb)

Sport
- Sport: Running
- Events: 100 metres, 200 metres, 400 metres
- Club: IFK Helsingborg

Achievements and titles
- Personal bests: 100 m: 10.44 s (2002) 200 m: 20.30 s (2007); 300 m: 32.10 s (2008) 400 m: 44.56 s (2007)
Medal record
Representing Sweden
Men's athletics
World Indoor Championships
Silver medal – second place	2004 Budapest	200 m
Silver medal – second place	2008 Valencia	400 m
European Championships
Silver medal – second place	2006 Gothenburg	200 m
European Indoor Championships
Gold medal – first place	2009 Turin	400 m
European Team Championships
Silver medal – second place	2009 Leiria	400 m

Johan Lukas Wissman (born 2 November 1982) is a Swedish athlete from Helsingborg, specializing in the 200 and 400 m. He is the current national record holder in both of these events.

Wissman won the gold medal at the European Indoor Championships in Athletics 2009 in Turin, Italy. This was Johan's first international gold medal at the time 45.89.

He finished second in 200 m at the World Indoor Athletics Championships 2004 and second in 400 m at the World Indoor Athletics Championships in 2008.

He also won the silver medal in the 200 m at the 2006 European Athletics Championships.

He came in seventh place in 400 m in the 2007 World Athletics Championships in Osaka, Japan, and he finished 8th in the 2008 Olympic Summer Games.

At the 2010 European Athletics Championships he focused on the 200 m, after being marred by injuries for most of the season. Wissman made it to the semifinals, where he was 0.02 seconds from a spot in the final.

== Personal bests ==
- 100 m - 10.44 s (2002)
- 200 m - 20.30 s (national record for Sweden) (2007)
- 400 m - 44.56 s (national record for Sweden) (2007)
- 400 m, indoor - 45.89 (2009)
