= Richard Buck (sprinter) =

British sprint athlete

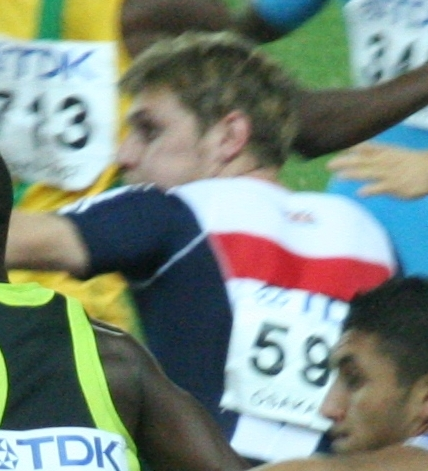
- Richard Buck in 2007

Personal information
- Nationality: British (English)
- Born: 14 November 1986 (age 39) Grimsby, England
- Height: 191 cm (6 ft 3 in)
- Weight: 92 kg (203 lb)

Sport
- Sport: Track and Field
- Events: 400 metres, 4 × 400 m Relay
- Club: City of York AC

Achievements and titles
- Personal best: 400 metres 45.61 (Genève 2012)
Medal record
Men's athletics
Representing Great Britain
World Indoor Championships
Silver medal – second place	2012 Istanbul	4 × 400 m relay
Bronze medal – third place	2010 Doha	4 × 400 m relay
European Indoor Championships
Gold medal – first place	2013 Gothenburg	4 × 400 m relay
Silver medal – second place	2009 Torino	4 × 400 m relay
Silver medal – second place	2011 Paris	4 × 400 m relay
Bronze medal – third place	2011 Paris	400 m
European Championships
Silver medal – second place	2012 Helsinki	4 × 400 m relay

Richard Thomas Buck (born 14 November 1986 in Grimsby, Humberside) is a former British sprinter who specialised in the 400 metres event. He is from York, and trains in Loughborough. Buck's current club is City of York A.C. (formerly Nestlé York A.C). Previously, he had an 18-month spell at Scarborough A.C. He has been trained by his grandfather, Geoff Barraclough,.

== Biography ==
After competing in basketball and high jump at Lady Lumley's School, Pickering, Buck took up sprinting at the age of 15. He quickly took to the sport, and was the fastest 400 m sprinter in his age group after two years. This form brought him to the attention of the national selectors, and he was selected to compete as England's only 400 m representative at the 2004 Commonwealth Youth Games, in Bendigo, Australia, where he won a bronze medal.

He came to national attention during the 2007 season, being selected to represent Great Britain at both the World Student Games and as part of the relay squad at the 2007 World Athletics Championships in Osaka.

His 2008 indoor season started well, with a win at the Norwich Union international match in Glasgow the 400 m, helping to secure a win for Great Britain. He also won the 400 m event at the World Indoor trials and National Championships in Sheffield and competed in the semi-finals of the 2008 World Indoor Championships.

In 2010, Buck made the semi-finals of the World Indoor Championships in Doha and won a bronze medal with the GB 4×400 m team. He was also a part of the silver medal-winning team at the European Athletics Championships in Barcelona. An ongoing Achilles tendon injury ruled Buck out of the Commonwealth Games in Delhi.

Buck had arguably his most successful year in 2011 where he took the bronze medal at the European indoor championships along with silver in the 4×400 m. Buck's outdoor season also opened well; Buck clocked a personal best time of 45.99 seconds in his first race.

Buck was selected in the World Championship 4×400 m squad and travelled with the team but did not race.

Buck was dropped from funding at the end of a 2011 season along with other big name athletes such as Kelly Sotherton. Seeking ways to fund his Olympic ambitions, Buck works part-time at a supermarket whilst juggling a heavy training schedule. Following an appearance on the ITV Yorkshire news programme Calendar, where he discussed his loss of funding, an anonymous donor sent Buck a cheque for £10,000. Buck clocked a lifetime best of 45.88 (indoors) in the national race at the Aviva Birmingham Grand Prix.

=== Olympics ===
Buck was selected to represent Great Britain at the 2008 Summer Olympics in the 4 × 400 metres relay event but a virus interrupted his training and he never competed in Beijing with the squad. However, Buck was spurred on by the disappointment and came back highly motivated. At the beginning of the 2009 season, Buck finished a close second behind Tyler Christopher at the Aviva International in Birmingham. He set a new indoor best of 46.22 s, which was the fourth-fastest European time at that point in the season. This boded well for the 2009 European Indoor Championships but he was disappointed with fifth place in the 400 m finals, finishing in 46.93 s. However, he claimed the silver medal as part of Britain's 4 × 400 metres relay team with a time of 3:07.04. Following the competition, he suffered a knee injury which ruled him out of competition for six weeks.

Buck was part of the Olympics competing for Team GB in the 4×400 m relay at the 2012 London Olympic Games.

=== Retirement ===
In July 2015 Buck announced that he was retiring from athletics to pursue a career as an actor, after accepting a place on a master's degree course at Birmingham School of Acting commencing that September.

Buck ran his final race in St Peter Port, Guernsey at the Intertrust Anniversary Games, winning ahead of current GB Junior Cameron Chalmers.

== Personal bests ==
Event	Best	Location	Date
200 metres	21.32	La Chaux-de-Fonds, Switzerland	7 July 2013
300 metres	33.25 s	Rieti, Italy	8 September 2013
300 metres (indoor)	33.90 s	Sheffield, England	13 December 2008
400 metres	45.61 s	Geneva, Switzerland	2 June 2012
400 metres (indoor)	45.88 s	Birmingham, England	18 February 2012

All information taken from IAAF profile
