= Jakub Krzewina =

Polish sprinter (born 1989)

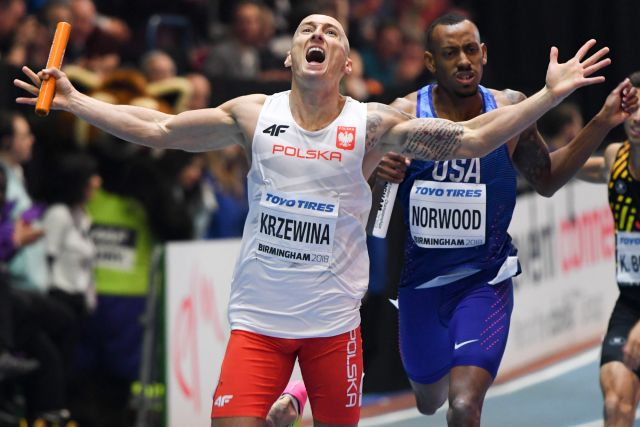
- Jakub Krzewina at the 2018 IAAF World Indoor Championships

Personal information
- Born: 10 October 1989 (age 36) Kruszwica, Poland
- Height: 1.82 m (6 ft 0 in)
- Weight: 79 kg (174 lb)

Sport
- Club: WKS Śląsk Wrocław
- Coached by: Józef Lisowski; Marek Adamek
Medal record
Men's athletics
Representing Poland
World Indoor Championships
Gold medal – first place	2018 Birmingham	4 × 400 m
European Championships
Silver medal – second place	2016 Amsterdam	4 × 400 m
Bronze medal – third place	2014 Zurich	4 × 400 m
European Indoor Championships
Silver medal – second place	2015 Prague	4 × 400 m
Representing Europe
IAAF Continental Cup
Silver medal – second place	2014 Marrakesh	4 × 400 m
European U23 Championships
Gold medal – first place	2009 Kaunas	4 × 400 m
Silver medal – second place	2011 Ostrava	4 × 400 m

Jakub Krzewina (Polish pronunciation: [ˈjakub kʂɛˈvina]; born 10 October 1989) is a Polish track and field sprinter who specialises in the 400 metres. A frequent competitor for Poland in the 4 × 400 metres relay, he has won two medals at the European Athletics Championships and reached the final at the 2016 Summer Olympics. He was also a relay silver medallist with Europe at the 2014 IAAF Continental Cup.

He has a personal best of 45.11 seconds for the distance. His best individual finish is fourth at the European Athletics Championships in 2014.

== Personal life ==
Krzewina was born on 10 October 1989 in Kruszwica, Poland.

== Career ==
Krzewina appeared on the national junior scene in 2007, placing third at the national junior championships in the 400 metres. He dipped under 48 seconds in the event for the first time that year. He won his first international selection at the 2007 European Athletics Junior Championships as part of Poland's 4 × 400 metres relay team. The team (including Jan Ciepiela, Sebastian Porzadny, and Marcin Klaczanski) reached the final, but was disqualified. His first individual international race came the year after at the 2008 World Junior Championships in Athletics, but he failed to progress beyond the heats. He was again chosen for the relay and he helped a team of Arkadiusz Wojno, Michał Pietrzak, and Rafał Omelko take fifth in the final. The 2009 season marked a career progression as he won the Polish under-23 title with a personal best of 46.66 seconds. He also won a relay gold medal at the 2009 European Athletics U23 Championships, running alongside Marcin Sobiech, Pietrzak, and Ciepiela.

Krzewina missed most of the 2010 season but returned in 2011 and made his first impact at the senior level. He anchored the Polish 4 × 400 m relay team at the 2011 European Athletics Indoor Championships, taking the team to fifth place. The team attempted to defend their title at the 2011 European Athletics U23 Championships, but were pipped to the gold by a tenth of a second by the British team. At the Polish Athletics Championships he placed fourth in the 400 m with a new best of 46.51 seconds. This earned his global senior debut at the 2011 World Championships in Athletics, where the Polish team of Kacper Kozłowski, Piotr Wiaderek, Krzewina and Marcin Marciniszyn ran in the relay. The team finished their heat in 3:01.84 minutes (the fastest for the country that year and of Krzewina's career) but this was not enough to make the final.

He began 2012 in peak form, setting an indoor best of 46.85 seconds then winning his first national title at the Polish Indoor Athletics Championships. An appearance at the 2012 IAAF World Indoor Championships followed but the team faltered in the relay final and came in sixth (last) place. He achieved a season's best of 46.55 seconds outdoors, but did not compete internationally as a poor performance at the national championships meant he was excluded from the relay team that competed at the 2012 Olympics. He performances declined further in 2013, having only a seventh-place finish nationally.

Krzewina improved at the start of 2014 with an indoor best of 46.54 seconds to finish as runner-up at the national championships. He anchored a team of Kozłowski, Omelko and Pietrzak to take Poland to fourth place in the 4 × 400 m relay final at the 2014 IAAF World Indoor Championships on home turf in Sopot (Krzewina's highest global finish at that point). He opened the outdoor season with a big personal best of 45.11 seconds. This marked ranked him fourth in the European rankings for that season. He repeated that time at the Polish Championships to claim his first national outdoor title in the 400 metres. He was chosen for both the individual and relay events at the 2014 European Athletics Championships. In his solo senior debut for Poland he reached the 400 m final and finished in fourth place, just behind Israel's Donald Sanford. Having missed the heats, he was drafted in as the last man for the Polish team in the 4 × 400 m relay final. Starting his leg in fourth place, he narrowly overhauled Thomas Jordier in the final straight to win the bronze medals for Poland (setting a personal relay best of 2:59.85 minutes in the process). His fourth in the individual event led to his inclusion on the European relay team for the 2014 IAAF Continental Cup and (teaming up with European rivals Conrad Williams, Sanford, and Martyn Rooney) he helped the team to silver behind the African team.

Krzewina and his teammates qualified to the 4 × 400 metres relay final at the 2016 Summer Olympics in Rio de Janeiro, Brazil.

The Polish quartet of Karol Zalewski, Rafał Omelko, Łukasz Krawczuk and Krzewina broke the world indoor record in the men's 4 × 400 m with a stunning finish to the final track event of the 2018 World Indoor Championships in Birmingham. On the last straight, Krzewina overtook the anchor of the American team, which lead from the start, and achieved the greatest success in his career.

In October 2022, Krzewina was issued with a 15-month ban backdated set to expire in December 2023 for an anti-doping rule violation for whereabouts failures.

== Competition record ==
Year	Competition	Venue	Position	Event	Notes
Representing Poland
2007	European Junior Championships	Hengelo, Netherlands	2nd (h)	4 × 400 m relay	3:08.17^{1}
2008	World Junior Championships	Bydgoszcz, Poland	22nd (h)	400 m	47.97
2008	World Junior Championships	Bydgoszcz, Poland	5th	4 × 400 m relay	3:08.65
2009	European U23 Championships	Kaunas, Lithuania	1st	4 × 400 m relay	3:03.74
2011	European Indoor Championships	Paris, France	4th	4 × 400 m relay	3:09.31
2011	European U23 Championships	Ostrava, Czech Republic	2nd	4 × 400 m relay	3:03.62
2011	World Championships	Daegu, South Korea	11th (h)	4 × 400 m relay	3:01.84
2012	World Indoor Championships	Istanbul, Turkey	6th	4 × 400 m relay	3:11.86
2014	World Indoor Championships	Sopot, Poland	4th	4 × 400 m relay	3:04.39
2014	European Championships	Zurich, Switzerland	4th	400 m	45.52
2014	European Championships	Zurich, Switzerland	3rd	4 × 400 m relay	2:59.85
2015	European Indoor Championships	Prague, Czech Republic	2nd	4 × 400 m relay	3:02.97
2015	World Championships	Beijing, China	11th (h)	4 × 400 m relay	3:00.72
2015	Military World Games	Mungyeong, South Korea	4th	4 × 400 m relay	3:04.25
2016	European Championships	Amsterdam, Netherlands	21st (sf)	400 m	46.50
2016	European Championships	Amsterdam, Netherlands	2nd	4 × 400 m relay	3:01.18
2016	Olympic Games	Rio de Janeiro, Brazil	7th	4 × 400 m relay	3:00.50
2018	World Indoor Championships	Birmingham, United Kingdom	9th (sf)	400 m	46.69
2018	World Indoor Championships	Birmingham, United Kingdom	1st	4 × 400 m relay	3:01.77 WIR
2021	Olympic Games	Tokyo, Japan	3rd (h)	4 × 400 m relay	2:58.55

^{1}Disqualified in the final
