= 2009 European Athletics U23 Championships – Men's 400 metres =

The men's 400 metres event at the 2009 European Athletics U23 Championships was held in Kaunas, Lithuania, at S. Dariaus ir S. Girėno stadionas (Darius and Girėnas Stadium) on 16 and 17 July.

== Medalists ==
Gold	Yannick Fonsat; France
Silver	Nigel Levine; United Kingdom
Bronze	Jan Ciepiela; Poland

== Results ==
=== Final ===
17 July

Rank	Name	Nationality	Time	Notes
1st place, gold medalist(s)	Yannick Fonsat	France	45.68	
2nd place, silver medalist(s)	Nigel Levine	United Kingdom	45.78	
3rd place, bronze medalist(s)	Jan Ciepiela	Poland	45.81	
4	Antoine Gillet	Belgium	46.13	
5	Yoan Décimus	France	46.37	
6	Marco Vistalli	Italy	46.67	
7	Marcin Sobiech	Poland	46.77	
8	Petros Kiriakidis	Greece	46.84	

=== Semifinals ===
16 July
Qualified: first 4 each to Final

==== Semifinal 1 ====
Rank	Name	Nationality	Time	Notes
1	Yannick Fonsat	France	46.42	Q
2	Petros Kiriakidis	Greece	46.52	Q
3	Marco Vistalli	Italy	46.55	Q
4	Marcin Sobiech	Poland	46.73	Q
5	Aleksey Aksyonov	Russia	46.75	
6	Matti Välimäki	Finland	46.89	
7	Andreas Bube	Denmark	46.97	
8	Mark Ujakpor	Spain	47.09	

==== Semifinal 2 ====
Rank	Name	Nationality	Time	Notes
1	Nigel Levine	United Kingdom	45.86	Q
2	Jan Ciepiela	Poland	46.15	Q
3	Antoine Gillet	Belgium	46.31	Q
4	Yoan Décimus	France	46.45	Q
5	Eric Krüger	Germany	46.79	
6	Ali Ekber Kayaş	Turkey	46.84	
7	Mame-Ibra Anne	France	46.93	
8	Domenico Fontana	Italy	47.65	

=== Heats ===
16 July
Qualified: first 3 each heat and 4 best to Semifinals

==== Heat 1 ====
Rank	Name	Nationality	Time	Notes
1	Nigel Levine	United Kingdom	46.88	Q
2	Antoine Gillet	Belgium	47.00	Q
3	Mame-Ibra Anne	France	47.17	Q
4	António Rodrigues	Portugal	47.62	
5	Aitor Martín	Spain	47.65	
6	Isalbet Juarez	Italy	48.31	

==== Heat 2 ====
Rank	Name	Nationality	Time	Notes
1	Yannick Fonsat	France	46.88	Q
2	Andreas Bube	Denmark	47.18	Q
3	Matti Välimäki	Finland	47.24	Q
4	Sebastjan Jagarinec	Slovenia	47.50	
5	Egidijus Švėgžda	Lithuania	48.50	
6	James D'Alfonso	Malta	49.19	
	Brian Gregan	Ireland	DNF	

==== Heat 3 ====
Rank	Name	Nationality	Time	Notes
1	Petros Kiriakidis	Greece	46.55	Q
2	Marcin Sobiech	Poland	46.63	Q
3	Marco Vistalli	Italy	46.82	Q
4	Aleksey Aksyonov	Russia	46.98	q
5	Mark Ujakpor	Spain	47.36	q
6	László Bartha	Hungary	47.60	

==== Heat 4 ====
Rank	Name	Nationality	Time	Notes
1	Yoan Décimus	France	46.66	Q
2	Jan Ciepiela	Poland	46.90	Q
3	Domenico Fontana	Italy	46.96	Q
4	Eric Krüger	Germany	47.05	q
5	Ali Ekber Kayaş	Turkey	47.15	q
6	Marc Orozco	Spain	47.55	
7	German Florentz	Israel	49.40	

== Participation ==
According to an unofficial count, 26 athletes from 19 countries participated in the event.

- Belgium (1)
- Denmark (1)
- Finland (1)
- France (3)
- Germany (1)
- Greece (1)
- Hungary (1)
- Ireland (1)
- Israel (1)
- Italy (3)
- Lithuania (1)
- Malta (1)
- Poland (2)
- Portugal (1)
- Russia (1)
- Slovenia (1)
- Spain (3)
- Turkey (1)
- United Kingdom (1)
