= 2012 European Athletics Championships – Men's 4 × 400 metres relay =

Men's 4 × 400 metres relay at the European Athletics Championships

The men's 4 × 400 metres relay at the 2012 European Athletics Championships was held at the Helsinki Olympic Stadium on 30 June and 1 July.

== Medalists ==
Gold	Antoine Gillet, Jonathan Borlée; Jente Bouckaert, Kevin Borlée; Belgium
Silver	Nigel Levine, Conrad Williams; Robert Tobin, Richard Buck; Great Britain
Bronze	Jonas Plass, Kamghe Gaba; Eric Krüger, Thomas Schneider; Germany

== Records ==
Standing records prior to the 2012 European Athletics Championships
World record	United States; Andrew Valmon, Quincy Watts; Butch Reynolds, Michael Johnson	2:54.29	Stuttgart, Germany	22 August 1993
European record	United Kingdom; Iwan Thomas, Jamie Baulch; Mark Richardson, Roger Black	2:56.60	Atlanta, United States	3 August 1996
Championship record	United Kingdom; Paul Sanders, Kriss Akabusi; John Regis, Roger Black	2:58.22	Split, Yugoslavia	1 September 1990
World Leading	University of Florida; Dedric Dukes, Hugh Graham Jr; Leonardo Seymore, Tony McQuay	3:00.02	Des Moines, United States	9 June 2012
European Leading	Belgium; Antoine Gillet, Jonathan Borlée; Jente Bouckaert, Kevin Borlée	3:01.76	Rome, Italy	31 May 2012
Broken records during the 2012 European Athletics Championships
European Leading	Belgium; Antoine Gillet, Jonathan Borlée; Jente Bouckaert, Kevin Borlée	3:01.09	Helsinki, Finland	1 July 2012

== Schedule ==
Date	Time	Round
30 June 2012	20:25	Round 1
1 July 2012	19:45	Final

== Results ==
=== Round 1 ===
First 3 in each heat (Q) and 2 best performers (q) advance to the Final.

Rank	Heat	Lane	Nation	Athletes	Time	Notes
1	2	6	Belgium	Nils Duerinck, Antoine Gillet, Jente Bouckaert, Kevin Borlée	3:05.29	Q
2	2	8	Czech Republic	Daniel Němeček, Pavel Maslák, Josef Prorok, Jakub Holuša	3:05.41	Q
3	1	2	Great Britain	Luke Lennon-Ford, Michael Bingham, Conrad Williams, Nigel Levine	3:05.50	Q
4	1	5	Poland	Kamil Budziejewski, Jan Ciepiela, Michał Pietrzak, Piotr Wiaderek	3:05.69	Q
5	1	3	Germany	Jonas Plass, Kamghe Gaba, Niklas Zender, Thomas Schneider	3:05.71	Q
6	2	7	Ukraine	Myhaylo Knysh, Oleksiy Ryemyen, Yevhen Hutsol, Volodymyr Burakov	3:06.12	Q
7	2	4	Netherlands	Joeri Moerman, Bram Peters, Dennis Spillekom, Youssef El Rhalfioui	3:06.15	q
8	1	6	France	Teddy Venel, Naman Keïta, Marc Macedot, Mame-Ibra Anne	3:06.44	q
9	1	4	Italy	Lorenzo Valentini, Isalbet Juarez, Andrea Barberi, Claudio Licciardello	3:08.78	
10	2	3	Spain	Roberto Briones, Mark Ujakpor, David Testa, Samuel García	3:09.11	
11	1	8	Russia	Yegor Kibakin, Aleksey Kenig, Maksim Aleksandrenko, Nikita Uglov	3:09.94	
12	2	2	Finland	Petteri Monni, Ville Wendelin, Oskari Mörö, Jani Koskela	3:10.26	
13	1	7	Turkey	Mehmet Güzel, Halit Kiliç, Bugra Han Kocabeyoglu, Yavuz Can	3:11.44	
14	2	5	Hungary	Tibor Kása, Zoltán Kovács, Dávid Bartha, Máté Lukács	3:11.79	
	1	1	Ireland	Brian Murphy, David Gillick, Tim Crowe, Jason Harvey	DQ	

=== Final ===
Rank	Lane	Nation	Athletes	Time	Notes
1st place, gold medalist(s)	6	Belgium	Antoine Gillet, Jonathan Borlée, Jente Bouckaert, Kevin Borlée	3:01.09	EL
2nd place, silver medalist(s)	5	Great Britain	Nigel Levine, Conrad Williams, Robert Tobin, Richard Buck	3:01.56	
3rd place, bronze medalist(s)	7	Germany	Jonas Plass, Kamghe Gaba, Eric Krüger, Thomas Schneider	3:01.77	
4	4	Poland	Piotr Wiaderek, Jan Ciepiela, Marcin Marciniszyn, Kacper Kozłowski	3:02.37	
5	3	Czech Republic	Daniel Němeček, Pavel Maslák, Josef Prorok, Jakub Holuša	3:02.72	NR
6	1	France	Teddy Venel, Toumane Coulibaly, Marc Macedot, Yannick Fonsat	3:03.04	
7	8	Ukraine	Oleksiy Ryemyen, Stanislav Melnykov, Yevhen Hutsol, Volodymyr Burakov	3:04.56	
8	2	Netherlands	Joeri Moerman, Bram Peters, Dennis Spillekom, Youssef El Rhalfioui	3:05.68	
