= 2009 European Athletics U23 Championships – Men's 4 × 400 metres relay =

The men's 4 x 400 metres relay event at the 2009 European Athletics U23 Championships was held in Kaunas, Lithuania, at S. Dariaus ir S. Girėno stadionas (Darius and Girėnas Stadium) on 18 and 19 July.

== Medalists ==
Gold	Marcin Sobiech; Jakub Krzewina; Michał Pietrzak; Jan Ciepiela; Łukasz Krawczuk^{*} Sebastian Porządny^{*} Poland
Silver	Marco Vistalli; Isalbet Juarez; Domenico Fontana; Matteo Galvan; Italy
Bronze	Bruno Naprix; Mame-Ibra Anne; Yoan Décimus; Yannick Fonsat; Abdesslam Merabet^{*} Adrien Clemenceau^{*} France

^{*}: Competed in heat.

== Results ==
=== Final ===
19 July

Rank	Nation	Competitors	Time	Notes
1st place, gold medalist(s)	Poland	Marcin Sobiech; Jakub Krzewina; Michał Pietrzak; Jan Ciepiela	3:03.74	
2nd place, silver medalist(s)	Italy	Marco Vistalli; Isalbet Juarez; Domenico Fontana; Matteo Galvan	3:03.79	
3rd place, bronze medalist(s)	France	Bruno Naprix; Mame-Ibra Anne; Yoan Décimus; Yannick Fonsat	3:04.06	
4	Belgium	Arnaud Ghislain; Joris Haeck; Arnaud Destatte; Antoine Gillet	3:04.51	
5	Spain	Aitor Martín; Mark Ujakpor; Pau Fradera; Marc Orozco	3:05.63	
6	United Kingdom	Luke Lennon-Ford; Kris Robertson; Jamie Bowie; Nigel Levine	3:06.18	
7	Greece	Tilemahos Routas; Ioannis Dovolis; Konstadinos Nakopoulos; Petros Kiriakidis	3:08.65	
8	Estonia	Taavi Liiv; Aarne Nirk; Kristjan Kangur; Marek Niit	3:12.30	

=== Heats ===
18 July
Qualified: first 3 in each heat and 2 to the Final

==== Heat 1 ====
Rank	Nation	Competitors	Time	Notes
1	Italy	Marco Vistalli; Isalbet Juarez; Domenico Fontana; Matteo Galvan	3:10.18	Q
2	France	Bruno Naprix; Abdesslam Merabet; Adrien Clemenceau; Yoan Décimus	3:10.20	Q
3	Greece	Tilemahos Routas; Ioannis Dovolis; Hristos Voyiatzis; Konstadinos Nakopoulos	3:10.34	Q
4	Lithuania	Artūras Kulnis; Egidijus Švėgžda; Valdas Valintėlis; Vitalij Kozlov	3:13.13	
5	Denmark	Nick Ekelund-Areander; Steven Kwasi-Korang; Andreas Bube; Matias Bredahl Reedtz	3:17.15	

==== Heat 2 ====
Rank	Nation	Competitors	Time	Notes
1	Poland	Łukasz Krawczuk; Michał Pietrzak; Sebastian Porządny; Jakub Krzewina	3:07.13	Q
2	Spain	Aitor Martín; Mark Ujakpor; Pau Fradera; Marc Orozco	3:07.80	Q
3	Belgium	Arnaud Destatte; Joris Haeck; Vincent Vanryckeghem; Arnaud Ghislain	3:07.98	Q
4	United Kingdom	Patrick Swan; Kris Robertson; Jamie Bowie; Luke Lennon-Ford	3:08.11	q
5	Estonia	Aarne Nirk; Taavi Liiv; Kristjan Kangur; Marek Niit	3:10.54	q
	Israel	German Florentz; Tarass Shcherenko; Gil Sheleg; Oleg Sologuv	DNS	

== Participation ==
According to an unofficial count, 47 athletes from 10 countries participated in the event.

- Belgium (5)
- Denmark (4)
- Estonia (4)
- France (6)
- Greece (5)
- Italy (4)
- Lithuania (4)
- Poland (6)
- Spain (4)
- United Kingdom (5)
