= 2009 European Athletics U23 Championships – Men's 110 metres hurdles =

Event at the 2009 European Athletics U23 Championships at Kaunas, Lithuania

The men's 110 metres hurdles event at the 2009 European Athletics U23 Championships was held in Kaunas, Lithuania, at S. Dariaus ir S. Girėno stadionas (Darius and Girėnas Stadium) on 17 and 18 July.

== Medalists ==
Gold	Artur Noga; Poland
Silver	Gianni Frankis; United Kingdom
Bronze	Callum Priestley; United Kingdom

== Results ==
=== Final ===
18 July
Wind: -0.7 m/s

Rank	Name	Nationality	Time	Notes
1st place, gold medalist(s)	Artur Noga	Poland	13.47	
2nd place, silver medalist(s)	Gianni Frankis	United Kingdom	13.57	
3rd place, bronze medalist(s)	Callum Priestley	United Kingdom	13.63	
4	Dimitri Bascou	France	13.66	
5	Dominik Bochenek	Poland	13.88	
6	Samuel Coco-Viloin	France	13.96	
7	Stefano Tedesco	Italy	14.01	
8	Alexandros Stavrides	Cyprus	14.09	

=== Heats ===
17 July
Qualified: first 2 each heat and 2 best to final

==== Heat 1 ====
Wind: 0.0 m/s

Rank	Name	Nationality	Time	Notes
1	Dimitri Bascou	France	13.54	Q
2	Callum Priestley	United Kingdom	13.70	Q
3	Stefano Tedesco	Italy	13.81	q
4	Paul Dittmer	Germany	13.83	
5	Maciej Wojtkowski	Poland	14.15	
6	Manuel Prazak	Austria	14.23	
7	Kārlis Daube	Latvia	14.26	
8	Juan Ramón Barragán	Spain	14.30	

==== Heat 2 ====
Wind: -0.4 m/s

Rank	Name	Nationality	Time	Notes
1	Gianni Frankis	United Kingdom	13.58	Q
2	Artur Noga	Poland	13.72	Q
3	Samuel Coco-Viloin	France	13.81	q
4	Aleksey Dryomin	Russia	13.95	
5	Viliam Papšo	Slovakia	14.10	
6	Erik Leeflang	Netherlands	14.10	
7	John Mark Nalocca	Italy	14.32	

==== Heat 3 ====
Wind: 0.9 m/s

Rank	Name	Nationality	Time	Notes
1	Dominik Bochenek	Poland	13.74	Q
2	Alexandros Stavrides	Cyprus	13.81	Q
3	Thomas Martinot-Lagarde	France	13.82	
4	Erik Balnuweit	Germany	13.85	
5	Konstantin Shabanov	Russia	13.87	
6	Balázs Baji	Hungary	13.96	
7	Tobias Furer	Switzerland	14.21	
8	Artūras Janauskas	Lithuania	14.77	

== Participation ==
According to an unofficial count, 23 athletes from 15 countries participated in the event.

- Austria (1)
- Cyprus (1)
- France (3)
- Germany (2)
- Hungary (1)
- Italy (2)
- Latvia (1)
- Lithuania (1)
- Netherlands (1)
- Poland (3)
- Russia (2)
- Slovakia (1)
- Spain (1)
- Switzerland (1)
- United Kingdom (2)
