= 2006 World Junior Championships in Athletics – Men's 110 metres hurdles =

The men's 110 metres hurdles event at the 2006 World Junior Championships in Athletics was held in Beijing, China, at Chaoyang Sports Centre on 18, 19 and 20 August. 99.0 cm (3'3) (junior implement) hurdles were used.

== Medalists ==
Gold	Artur Noga; Poland
Silver	Samuel Coco-Viloin; France
Bronze	Konstadínos Douvalídis; Greece

== Results ==
=== Final ===
20 August
Wind: +1.5 m/s

Rank	Name	Nationality	Time	Notes
1st place, gold medalist(s)	Artur Noga	Poland	13.23	
2nd place, silver medalist(s)	Samuel Coco-Viloin	France	13.35	
3rd place, bronze medalist(s)	Konstadínos Douvalídis	Greece	13.39	
4	Vladimir Zhukov	Russia	13.53	
5	Wojciech Jurkowski	Poland	13.58	
6	Darius Reed	United States	13.64	
7	Gianni Frankis	United Kingdom	13.71	
8	Hong Xiaofeng	China	13.75	

=== Semifinals ===
19 August

==== Semifinal 1 ====
Wind: -1.3 m/s

Rank	Name	Nationality	Time	Notes
1	Vladimir Zhukov	Russia	13.78	Q
2	Wojciech Jurkowski	Poland	13.83	Q
3	Darius Reed	United States	13.83	q
4	Mike van Kruchten	Netherlands	13.91	
5	Stevy Telliam	France	14.03	
6	Erik Balnuweit	Germany	14.12	
7	Idris Abdelrahman	Egypt	14.29	
8	Rauno Kirschbaum	Estonia	14.42	

==== Semifinal 2 ====
Wind: -1.4 m/s

Rank	Name	Nationality	Time	Notes
1	Artur Noga	Poland	13.43	Q
2	Konstadínos Douvalídis	Greece	13.72	Q
3	Paul Dittmer	Germany	13.95	
4	Jorge McFarlane	Peru	13.97	
5	Julian Adeniran	United Kingdom	14.01	
6	Keiron Stewart	Jamaica	14.15	
7	Louw Smit	South Africa	14.17	
8	Stefano Tedesco	Italy	14.26	

==== Semifinal 3 ====
Wind: -0.4 m/s

Rank	Name	Nationality	Time	Notes
1	Samuel Coco-Viloin	France	13.63	Q
2	Gianni Frankis	United Kingdom	13.81	Q
3	Hong Xiaofeng	China	13.86	q
4	Dennis Martin	United States	13.92	
5	Rayzam Wan Sofian	Malaysia	13.95	
6	Lachlan Stanton	Australia	14.02	
7	Otto Kilpi	Finland	14.19	
8	Andre Collins	Jamaica	14.40	

=== Heats ===
18 August

==== Heat 1 ====
Wind: -0.5 m/s

Rank	Name	Nationality	Time	Notes
1	Vladimir Zhukov	Russia	13.93	Q
2	Dennis Martin	United States	14.04	Q
3	Erik Balnuweit	Germany	14.05	Q
4	Julian Adeniran	United Kingdom	14.05	Q
5	Stefano Tedesco	Italy	14.18	q
6	Lehann Fourie	South Africa	14.25	
7	Rok Derzanic	Slovenia	14.48	
8	Jonathan Davis	Venezuela	14.53	
9	Tiaan Maritz	Namibia	15.07	

==== Heat 2 ====
Wind: +0.7 m/s

Rank	Name	Nationality	Time	Notes
1	Konstadínos Douvalídis	Greece	13.46	Q
2	Artur Noga	Poland	13.64	Q
3	Rayzam Wan Sofian	Malaysia	14.07	Q
4	Rauno Kirschbaum	Estonia	14.32	Q
5	Wang Hung-Wen	Chinese Taipei	14.38	
6	Carlo Redaelli	Italy	14.43	
7	Sajjad Razmjoo	Iran	14.54	
8	Toriki Urarii	French Polynesia	14.92	

==== Heat 3 ====
Wind: 0.0 m/s

Rank	Name	Nationality	Time	Notes
1	Wojciech Jurkowski	Poland	13.48	Q
2	Darius Reed	United States	13.81	Q
3	Mike van Kruchten	Netherlands	13.81	Q
4	Otto Kilpi	Finland	13.91	Q
5	Lachlan Stanton	Australia	14.00	q
6	Andre Collins	Jamaica	14.03	q
7	Idris Abdelrahman	Egypt	14.12	q
8	Abdul Hakeem Bin Abdul Halim	Singapore	14.83	

==== Heat 4 ====
Wind: +0.8 m/s

Rank	Name	Nationality	Time	Notes
1	Gianni Frankis	United Kingdom	13.74	Q
2	Keiron Stewart	Jamaica	13.80	Q
3	Louw Smit	South Africa	13.86	Q
4	Stevy Telliam	France	13.88	Q
5	Li Haolun	China	14.25	
6	Levente Käfer	Hungary	14.37	
7	Alberto Ferrer	Spain	14.43	
	Ryan Brathwaite	Barbados	DQ	

==== Heat 5 ====
Wind: -0.2 m/s

Rank	Name	Nationality	Time	Notes
1	Samuel Coco-Viloin	France	13.55	Q
2	Hong Xiaofeng	China	13.93	Q
3	Jorge McFarlane	Peru	13.96	Q
4	Paul Dittmer	Germany	14.05	Q
5	Juan Ramón Barragan	Spain	14.20	
6	Srdan Bajic	Serbia	14.33	
7	Hans Villagrán	Guatemala	14.61	

== Participation ==
According to an unofficial count, 40 athletes from 30 countries participated in the event.

- Australia (1)
- Barbados (1)
- China (2)
- Chinese Taipei (1)
- Egypt (1)
- Estonia (1)
- Finland (1)
- France (2)
- French Polynesia (1)
- Germany (2)
- Greece (1)
- Guatemala (1)
- Hungary (1)
- Iran (1)
- Italy (2)
- Jamaica (2)
- Malaysia (1)
- Namibia (1)
- Netherlands (1)
- Peru (1)
- Poland (2)
- Russia (1)
- Serbia (1)
- Singapore (1)
- Slovenia (1)
- South Africa (2)
- Spain (2)
- United Kingdom (2)
- United States (2)
- Venezuela (1)
