= Arnaud Destatte =

Belgian sprinter

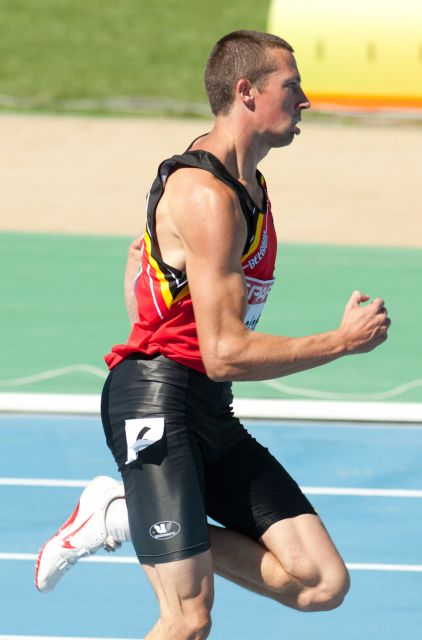
Arnaud Destatte at the 2010 European Athletics Championships.

Arnaud Destatte (born 26 July 1988) is a Belgian sprinter, who specializes in the 400 metres.

== Achievements ==
Year	Competition	Venue	Position	Event	Notes
Representing Belgium
2009	Universiade	Belgrade, Serbia	4th	4 × 400 m relay	3:06.61
2009	European U23 Championships	Kaunas, Lithuania	4th	4 × 400 m relay	3:04.51
2010	European Championships	Barcelona, Spain	18 (sf)	400 m	46.38
2010	European Championships	Barcelona, Spain	3rd	4 × 400 m relay	3:02.60
