= 2009 European Athletics Indoor Championships – Men's 4 × 400 metres relay =

The Men's 4 × 400 metres relay event at the 2009 European Athletics Indoor Championships was held on March 8.

== Results ==
| Rank | Team | Athlete | Time | Notes |
|---|---|---|---|---|
| 1st place, gold medalist(s) | Italy | Jacopo Marin; Matteo Galvan; Domenico Rao; Claudio Licciardello | 3:06.68 | |
| 2nd place, silver medalist(s) | Great Britain | Richard Buck; Nick Leavey; Nigel Levine; Philip Taylor | 3:07.04 | |
| 3rd place, bronze medalist(s) | Poland | Jan Ciepiela; Marcin Marciniszyn; Jarosław Wasiak; Piotr Klimczak | 3:07.04 | |
| 4 | Germany | Florian Seitz; Thomas Goller; Thomas Schneider; Miguel Rigau | 3:07.14 | |
| | Russia | Denis Alekseyev; Konstantin Svechkar; Vladimir Krasnov; Maksim Dyldin | ~~3:07.83~~ | Doping |
| 5 | France | Yannick Fonsat; Yoan Décimus; Nicolas Fillon; Brice Panel | 3:11.27 | |
