= Aleksey Aksyonov =

Russian sprinter

Aleksey Aleksandrovich Aksyonov (Russian: Алексей Александрович Аксёнов; born 10 December 1987) is a Russian sprint athlete.

== Achievements ==
Year	Competition	Venue	Position	Event	Notes
Representing Russia
2009	European U23 Championships	Kaunas, Lithuania	9th (sf)	400m	46.75
2010	European Championships	Barcelona, Spain	1st	4 × 400 m relay	3:02.14
