= Athletics at the 2013 Jeux de la Francophonie =

Athletics at the VII Francophonie Games
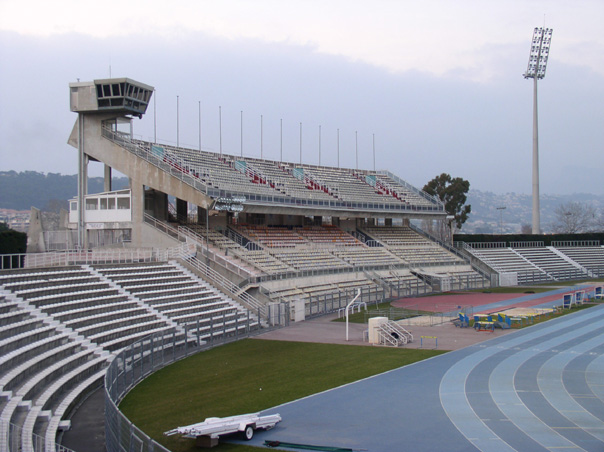
- Host stadium in Nice
- Dates: 10–14 September 2013
- Host city: Nice, France
- Venue: Stade Charles-Ehrmann
- Events: 43
- Participation: 402 athletes from 42 nations
- Records set: 8 GR's

At the 2013 Jeux de la Francophonie, the athletics events were held at Stade Charles-Ehrmann from September 10 to September 14. The host country, France, topped the medal table in front of Poland and Canada. A total of 8 Games records was bettered during the competition.

== Medal summary ==
=== Men ===
Event	Gold		Silver		Bronze	
100 metres	Emmanuel Biron (FRA)	10.41	Dontae Richards-Kwok (CAN)	10.46	Samuel Francis (QAT)	10.53
200 metres	Oluwasegun Makinde (CAN)	20.80	Idrissa Adam (CMR)	21.21	Jonathan Permal (MRI)	21.35
400 metres	Antoine Gillet (Wallonia)	46.64	Toumany Coulibaly (FRA); Angel Chelala (FRA)	46.87	Not awarded	
800 metres	Musaab Bala (QAT)	1:46:57	Samir Jamaa (MAR)	1:47:50	Nader Belhanbel (MAR)	1:47:72
1500 metres	Ayanleh Souleiman (DJI)	3:57.35	Krzysztof Żebrowski (POL)	3:57.58	Fouad El Kaam (MAR)	3:57.91
5000 metres	Othmane El Goumri (MAR)	13:48.76	Younès Essalhi (MAR)	13:49.36	Youssouf Hiss Bachir (DJI)	13:50.61
10,000 metres	Hicham Bellani (MAR)	28:49.09	Olivier Irabaruta (BDI)	28:53.34	Mustapha El Aziz (MAR)	29:05.05
110 metres hurdles	Sékou Kaba (CAN)	13.84	Ladji Doucouré (FRA)	13.95	Ingvar Moseley (CAN)	14.02
400 metres hurdles	Mamadou Kassé Hanne (SEN)	49.48	Yoann Décimus (FRA)	50.05	Mohamed Seghaier (TUN)	50.46
3000 metres steeplechase	Hamid Ezzine (MAR)	8:43.41	Yoann Kowal (FRA)	8:43.79	Maaz Abdelrahman Shagag (QAT)	8:45.16
4 × 100 metres relay	Canada (CAN); Aaron Bowman; Oluwasegun Makinde; Dontae Richards-Kwok; Jared Connaughton	39.14	France (FRA); Mickaël-Meba Zézé; David Alerte; Arnaud Rémy; Emmanuel Biron	39.36	Wallonia (Wallonia); Damien Broothaerts; Kevin Borlée; Jonathan Borlée; Julien Watrin	39.58
4 × 400 metres relay	France (FRA); Toumany Coulibaly; Mamoudou-Elimane Hanne; Yoann Décimus; Angel Chelala	3:05.22	Wallonia (Wallonia); Robin Vanderbemden; Antoine Gillet; Dylan Borlée; Will Oyowe	3:06.24	Switzerland (SUI); Silvan Lutz; Kariem Hussein; Daniele Angelella; Philipp Weissenberger	3:07.21
20 kilometres walk	Kevin Campion (FRA)	1:24:32	Evan Dunfee (CAN)	1:25:30	Mabrook Saleh Mohamed (QAT)	1:26:26 NR
High jump	Derek Drouin (CAN)	2.30 m	Mickaël Hanany (FRA); Mihai Donisan (ROU)	2.30 m	Not awarded	
Pole vault	Valentin Lavillenie (FRA)	5.50 m	Shawnacy Barber (CAN); Jason Wurster (CAN)	5.20 m	Not awarded	
Long jump	Adrian Strzałkowski (POL)	7.99 m (w)	Kafétien Gomis (FRA)	7.81 m	Adrian Vasile (ROU)	7.78 m (w)
Triple jump	Yoann Rapinier (FRA)	17.11 m	Gaëtan Saku Bafuanga Baya (FRA)	16.93 m	Tarik Bouguetaïb (MAR)	16.66 m
Shot put	Tomasz Majewski (POL)	20.18 m GR	Gaëtan Bucki (FRA)	19.33 m	Timothy Nedow (CAN)	19.09 m
Discus throw	Sergiu Ursu (ROU)	62.87 m	Rashid Shafi Al-Dosari (QAT)	59.06 m	Ahmed Dheeb (QAT)	58.65 m
Hammer throw	Paweł Fajdek (POL)	78.28 m	Quentin Bigot (FRA)	74.60 m	Ashraf Amgad Elseify (QAT)	72.88 m
Javelin throw	Łukasz Grzeszczuk (POL)	78.62 m GR	Curtis Moss (CAN)	76.04 m	Killian Durechou (FRA)	73.22 m
Decathlon	Bastien Auzeil (FRA)	7789 pts	Darko Pešić (MNE)	7636 pts	Guillaume Thierry (MRI)	7511 pts

=== Women ===
Event	Gold		Silver		Bronze	
100 metres	Ayodelé Ikuesan (FRA)	11.72	Andreea Ogrăzeanu (ROM)	11.72	Shai-Anne Davis (CAN)	11.80
200 metres	Crystal Emmanuel (CAN)	23.63	Léa Sprunger (SUI)	23.83	Cynthia Bolingo Mbongo (Wallonia)	24.08
400 metres	Floria Gueï (FRA)	52.31	Marie Gayot (FRA)	52.33	Bianca Răzor (ROU)	52.69
800 metres	Elena Mirela Lavric (ROU)	2:02.27	Malika Akkaoui (MAR)	2:02.61	Melissa Bishop (CAN)	2:03.44
1500 metres	Rababe Arafi (MAR)	4:18.70	Siham Hilali (MAR)	4:18.89	Angelika Cichocka (POL)	4:19.37
10,000 metres	Diane Nukuri (BDI)	32:29.14 GR	Khadija Sammah (MAR)	32:38.42	Claudette Mukasakindi (RWA)	33:20.87
100 metres hurdles	Anne Zagré (Wallonia)	13.41	Gnima Faye (SEN)	13.47	Clélia Reuse (SUI)	13.57
400 metres hurdles	Hayat Lambarki (MAR)	57.22	Noelle Montcalm (CAN)	57.52	Mame Fatou Faye (SEN)	57.66
3000 metres steeplechase	Ancuța Bobocel (ROU)	9:46.82	Salima El Ouali Alami (MAR)	9:48.53	Geneviève Lalonde (New Brunswick)	9:53.35
4 × 100 metres relay	Wallonia (Wallonia); Laura Leprince; Laetitia Libert; Cynthia Bolingo Mbongo; Anne Zagré	44.70	Switzerland (SUI); Clélia Reuse; Sarah Atcho; Marisa Lavanchy; Léa Sprunger	45.01	France (FRA); Aisseta Diawara; Carima Louami; Émilie Gaydu; Ayodelé Ikuesan	45.03
4 × 400 metres relay	Romania (ROU); Sanda Belgyan; Elena Mirela Lavric; Adelina Pastor; Bianca Răzor	3:29.81	Canada (CAN); Adrienne Power; Melissa Bishop; Noelle Montcalm; Alicia Brown	3:34.25	France (FRA); Émeline Bauwe; Clarisse Moh; Fanny Lefevre; Floria Gueï	3:35.20
20 kilometres walk	Laure Polli (SUI)	1:37:23 GR	Inès Pastorino (FRA)	1:39:14	Corinne Baudoin (FRA)	1:40:39
High jump	Melanie Skotnik (FRA)	1.90 m	Justyna Kasprzycka (POL)	1.88 m	Michelle Theophille (CAN)	1.86 m
Pole vault	Marion Lotout (FRA)	4.40 m GR	Fanny Smets (Wallonia)	4.40 m =GR	Heather Hamilton (CAN); Syrine Balti-Ebondo (TUN)	4.10 m
Long jump	Anna Jagaciak (POL)	6.68 m GR	Teresa Dobija (POL)	6.66 m	Christabel Nettey (CAN)	6.63 m
Triple jump	Anna Jagaciak (POL)	13.92 m	Carmen Toma (ROU)	13.92 m	Sandrine Mbumi (CMR)	13.44 m
Shot put	Anca Heltne (ROU)	17.14 m	Fabienne Digard (FRA)	15.32 m	Auriol Dongmo Mekemnang (CMR)	15.30 m
Discus throw	Kazai Suzanne Kragbé (CIV)	55.58 m	Lucie Catouillart (FRA)	53.12 m	Pauline Pousse (FRA)	53.07 m
Hammer throw	Anita Włodarczyk (POL)	75.62 m GR	Bianca Perie (ROU)	70.41 m	Alexandra Tavernier (FRA)	69.95 m
Javelin throw	Krista Woodward (CAN)	52.82 m	Alexia Kogut Kubiak (FRA)	51.35 m	Jessica Rosun (MRI)	49.36 m
Heptathlon	Laura Arteil (FRA)	5534 pts	Madelaine Buttinger (CAN)	5177 pts	Nada Charoudi (TUN)	4966 pts

== Medal table ==
* Host nation (France)

Rank	Nation	Gold	Silver	Bronze	Total
1	France (FRA)*	11	15	7	33
2	Poland (POL)	7	3	1	11
3	Canada (CAN)	6	8	7	21
4	Morocco (MAR)	5	6	4	15
5	Romania (ROU)	5	4	2	11
6	Wallonia (Wallonia)	3	2	2	7
7	Switzerland (SUI)	1	2	2	5
8	Qatar (QAT)	1	1	5	7
9	Senegal (SEN)	1	1	1	3
10	Burundi (BDI)	1	1	0	2
11	Djibouti (DJI)	1	0	1	2
12	Ivory Coast (CIV)	1	0	0	1
13	Cameroon (CMR)	0	1	2	3
14	Montenegro (MNE)	0	1	0	1
15	Mauritius (MRI)	0	0	3	3
15	Tunisia (TUN)	0	0	3	3
17	New Brunswick (New Brunswick)	0	0	1	1
17	Rwanda (RWA)	0	0	1	1
Totals (18 entries)		43	45	42	130

== Participating nations ==
- Armenia (4)
- Benin (3)
- Burkina Faso (9)
- Burundi (4)
- Cambodia (1)
- Cameroon (10)
- Canada (58)
- Cape Verde (4)
- Chad (4)
- Comoros (2)
- Cyprus (2)
- Democratic Republic of the Congo (1)
- Djibouti (3)
- Equatorial Guinea (4)
- France (63)
- Gabon (2)
- Guinea (1)
- Haiti (1)
- Ivory Coast (7)
- Lebanon (4)
- Luxembourg (13)
- Madagascar (2)
- Mali (4)
- Mauritius (13)
- Montenegro (1)
- Morocco (23)
- New Brunswick (8)
- Niger (4)
- Poland (22)
- Qatar (10)
- Quebec (10)
- Republic of the Congo (3)
- Romania (17)
- Rwanda (2)
- Saint Lucia (1)
- Senegal (10)
- Seychelles (3)
- Slovenia (4)
- Switzerland (23)
- Tunisia (11)
- Vietnam (11)
- Wallonia-Brussels (20)
