= 2010 European Athletics Championships – Men's 4 × 400 metres relay =

Men's 4 × 400 metres relay at the European Athletics Championships

The men's 4 × 400 metres relay at the 2010 European Athletics Championships was held at the Estadi Olímpic Lluís Companys on 31 July and 1 August.

== Medalists ==
Gold	Maksim Dyldin, Alexey Aksenov, Vladimir Krasnov, Pavel Trenikhin; Russia (RUS)
Silver	(United Kingdom) Conrad Williams, Michael Bingham, Martyn Rooney, Robert Tobin; Great Britain (GBR)
Bronze	Arnaud Destatte, Kevin Borlée, Cédric Van Branteghem, Jonathan Borlée; Belgium (BEL)

== Records ==
Standing records prior to the 2010 European Athletics Championships
World record	United States; Andrew Valmon, Quincy Watts; Butch Reynolds, Michael Johnson	2:54.29	Stuttgart, Germany	22 August 1993
European record	United Kingdom; Iwan Thomas, Jamie Baulch; Mark Richardson, Roger Black	2:56.60	Atlanta, United States	3 August 1996
Championship record	United Kingdom; Paul Sanders, Kriss Akabusi; John Regis, Roger Black	2:58.22	Split, Yugoslavia	1 September 1990
World Leading	United States U23; LeJerald Betters, O'Neal Wilder; Joey Hughes, Tavaris Tate	2:58.83	Miramar, FL, United States	11 July 2010
European Leading	Russia; Maksim Dyldin, Valentin Kruglyakov; Pavel Trenikhin, Vladimir Krasnov	3:01.72	Bergen, Norway	20 June 2010

== Schedule ==
Date	Time	Round
31 July 2010	11:20	Round 1
1 August 2010	21:55	Final

== Results ==
=== Round 1 ===
First 3 in each heat (Q) and 2 best performers (q) advance to the Final.

==== Heat 1 ====
Rank	Lane	Nation	Athletes	React	Time	Notes
1	2	Great Britain & N.I.	Conrad Williams, Graham Hedman, Richard Buck, Robert Tobin	0.247	3:04.09	Q
2	1	Poland	Marcin Marciniszyn, Daniel Dąbrowski, Piotr Klimczak, Jan Ciepiela	0.234	3:04.51	Q
3	8	Netherlands	Joeri Moerman, Youssef El Rhalfioui, Dennis Spillekom, Robert Lathouwers	0.205	3:04.52	Q
4	5	France	Yannick Fonsat, Mamoudou Hanne, Mame-Ibra Anne, Yoan Décimus	0.189	3:05.32	q
5	4	Ukraine	Maksym Nakonechnyy, Myhaylo Knysh, Volodymyr Burakov, Dmytro Ostrovskyy	0.314	3:05.51	
6	6	Ireland	Gordon Kennedy, Brian Murphy, Brian Gregan, Steven Colvert	0.230	3:07.21	
7	3	Spain	Marc Orozco, Mark Ujakpor, Santiago Ezquerro, Antonio Manuel Reina	0.199	3:07.38	
8	7	Romania	Adrian Dragan, Iulian Geambazu, Attila Nagy, Catalin Cîmpeanu	0.355	3:09.48	

==== Heat 2 ====
Rank	Lane	Nation	Athletes	React	Time	Notes
1	2	Belgium	Antoine Gillet, Cédric Van Branteghem, Nils Duerinck, Kevin Borlée	0.238	3:03.49	Q
2	6	Germany	Kamghe Gaba, Bastian Swillims, Jonas Plass, Thomas Schneider	0.168	3:03.83	Q
3	1	Russia	Maksim Dyldin, Aleksey Aksyonov, Sergey Petukhov, Pavel Trenikhin	0.199	3:04.20	Q
4	3	Italy	Claudio Licciardello, Luca Galletti, Domenico Fontana, Marco Vistalli	0.246	3:04.55	q
5	5	Greece	Pétros Kiriakídis, Dimítrios Grávalos, Padeleímon Melahrinoúdis, Sotírios Iakovákis	0.250	3:07.12	
6	4	Hungary	Máté Lukács, Gábor Pásztor, Zoltán Kovács, Marcell Deák-Nagy	0.231	3:08.32	
7	7	Slovenia	Uros Jovanovic, Sebastjan Jagarinec, Marko Macuh, Erik Voncina	0.174	3:08.95	
8	8	Denmark	Jacob Fabricius Riis, Andreas Hjartbro Bube, Daniel B. Christensen, Nicklas Hyde	0.190	3:09.04	

==== Summary ====
Rank	Heat	Lane	Nation	Athletes	React	Time	Notes
1	2	2	Belgium	Antoine Gillet, Cédric Van Branteghem, Nils Duerinck, Kevin Borlée	0.238	3:03.49	Q
2	2	6	Germany	Kamghe Gaba, Bastian Swillims, Jonas Plass, Thomas Schneider	0.168	3:03.83	Q
3	1	2	Great Britain & N.I.	Conrad Williams, Graham Hedman, Richard Buck, Robert Tobin	0.247	3:04.09	Q
4	2	1	Russia	Maksim Dyldin, Aleksey Aksyonov, Sergey Petukhov, Pavel Trenikhin	0.199	3:04.20	Q
5	1	1	Poland	Marcin Marciniszyn, Daniel Dąbrowski, Piotr Klimczak, Jan Ciepiela	0.234	3:04.51	Q
6	1	8	Netherlands	Joeri Moerman, Youssef El Rhalfioui, Dennis Spillekom, Robert Lathouwers	0.205	3:04.52	Q
7	2	3	Italy	Claudio Licciardello, Luca Galletti, Domenico Fontana, Marco Vistalli	0.246	3:04.55	q
8	1	5	France	Yannick Fonsat, Mamoudou Hanne, Mame-Ibra Anne, Yoan Décimus	0.189	3:05.32	q
9	1	4	Ukraine	Maksym Nakonechnyy, Myhaylo Knysh, Volodymyr Burakov, Dmytro Ostrovskyy	0.314	3:05.51	
10	2	5	Greece	Pétros Kiriakídis, Dimítrios Grávalos, Padeleímon Melahrinoúdis, Sotírios Iakovákis	0.250	3:07.12	
11	1	6	Ireland	Gordon Kennedy, Brian Murphy, Brian Gregan, Steven Colvert	0.230	3:07.21	
12	1	3	Spain	Marc Orozco, Mark Ujakpor, Santiago Ezquerro, Antonio Manuel Reina	0.199	3:07.38	
13	2	4	Hungary	Máté Lukács, Gábor Pásztor, Zoltán Kovács, Marcell Deák-Nagy	0.231	3:08.32	
14	2	7	Slovenia	Uros Jovanovic, Sebastjan Jagarinec, Marko Macuh, Erik Voncina	0.174	3:08.95	
15	2	8	Denmark	Jacob Fabricius Riis, Andreas Hjartbro Bube, Daniel B. Christensen, Nicklas Hyde	0.190	3:09.04	
16	1	7	Romania	Adrian Dragan, Iulian Geambazu, Attila Nagy, Catalin Cîmpeanu	0.355	3:09.48	

=== Final ===
Rank	Lane	Nationality	Athlete	React	Time	Notes
1st place, gold medalist(s)	7	Russia	Maksim Dyldin, Aleksey Aksyonov, Pavel Trenikhin, Vladimir Krasnov	0.210	3:02.14	
2nd place, silver medalist(s)	3	Great Britain & N.I.	Conrad Williams, Michael Bingham, Robert Tobin, Martyn Rooney	0.242	3:02.25	
3rd place, bronze medalist(s)	4	Belgium	Arnaud Destatte, Kevin Borlée, Cédric Van Branteghem, Jonathan Borlée	0.178	3:02.60	
4	5	Germany	Kamghe Gaba, Bastian Swillims, Eric Krüger, Thomas Schneider	0.192	3:02.65	
5	6	Poland	Marcin Marciniszyn, Daniel Dąbrowski, Piotr Klimczak, Kacper Kozłowski	0.273	3:03.42	
6	1	France	Leslie Djhone, Yannick Fonsat, Mame-Ibra Anne, Teddy Venel	0.173	3:03.85	
7	8	Netherlands	Joeri Moerman, Youssef El Rhalfioui, Dennis Spillekom, Robert Lathouwers	0.184	3:04.13	
8	2	Italy	Marco Vistalli, Luca Galletti, Claudio Licciardello, Andrea Barberi	0.204	3:04.20	
