= Dominik Bochenek =

Polish hurdler (born 1987)

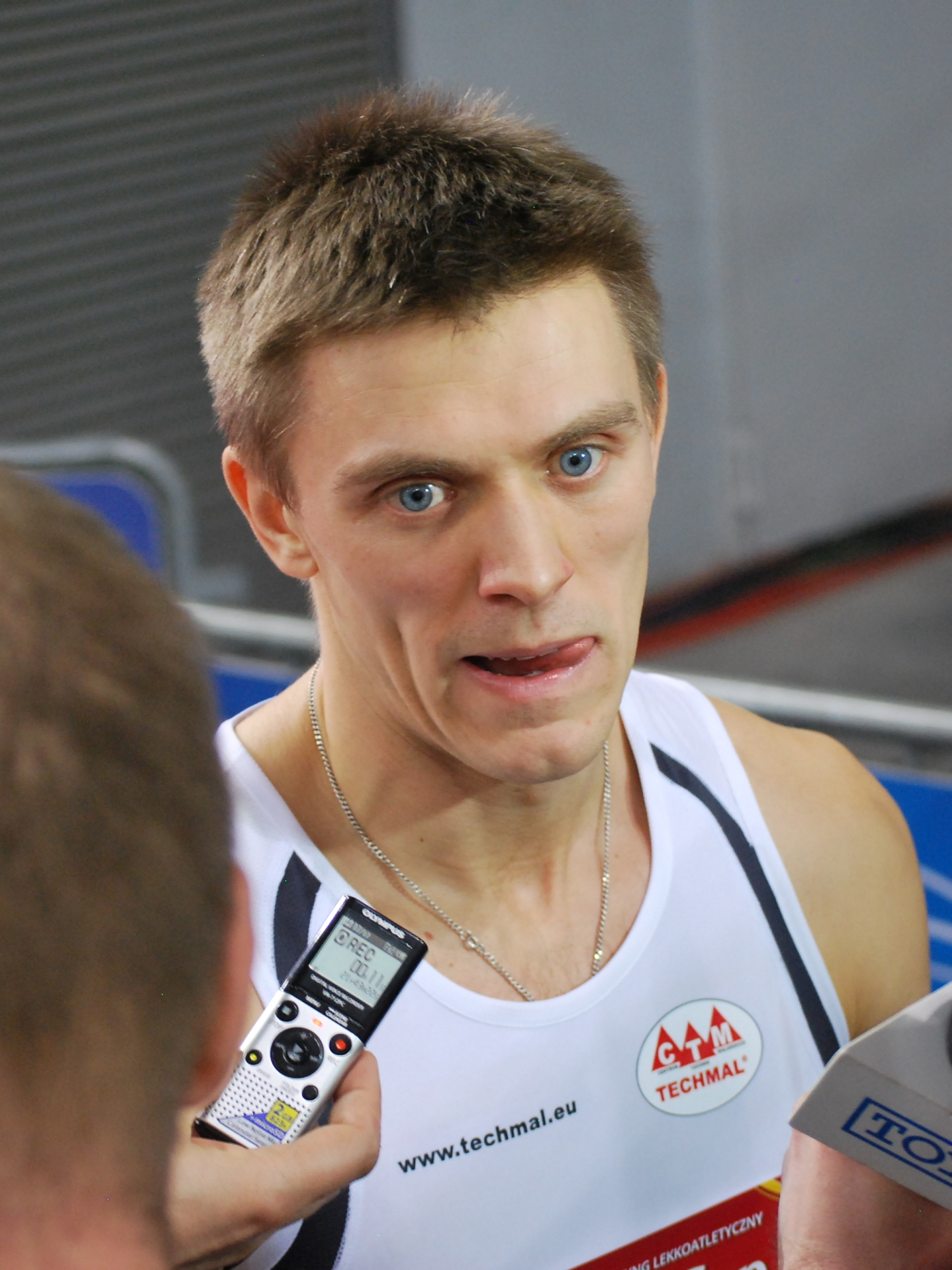
- Dominik Bochenek in 2015

Personal information
- Full name: Dominik Tadeusz Bochenek
- Nationality: Poland
- Born: 14 May 1987 (age 39) Jasło, Poland
- Height: 1.77 m (5 ft 10 in)
- Weight: 72 kg (159 lb)

Sport
- Sport: Athletics
- Event: 110 m hurdles
- Club: Zawisza Bydgoszcz

Dominik Bochenek (born 14 May 1987, in Jasło) is a Polish athlete specializing in the high hurdles. He represented his country at four consecutive World Indoor Championships, as well as many continental level competitions.

His 110 metres hurdles personal best is 13.44 (2011) while his 60 metres hurdles best is 7.63 (2014).

== Competition record ==
Year	Competition	Venue	Position	Event	Notes
Representing Poland
2005	European Junior Championships	Kaunas, Lithuania	24th (h)	400 m hurdles	53.92
2008	World Indoor Championships	Valencia, Spain	23rd (sf)	60 m hurdles	7.97
2009	European U23 Championships	Kaunas, Lithuania	5th	110 m hurdles	13.88
2010	World Indoor Championships	Doha, Qatar	21st (sf)	60 m hurdles	7.91
2010	European Championships	Barcelona, Spain	14th (sf)	110 m hurdles	14.13
2011	World Championships	Daegu, South Korea	29th (h)	110 m hurdles	13.96
2012	World Indoor Championships	Istanbul, Turkey	19th (h)	60 m hurdles	7.85
2012	European Championships	Helsinki, Finland	30th (h)	110 m hurdles	14.15
2013	European Indoor Championships	Gothenburg, Sweden	10th (sf)	60 m hurdles	7.71
2014	World Indoor Championships	Sopot, Poland	12th (sf)	60 m hurdles	7.66
2014	European Championships	Zürich, Switzerland	21st (h)	110 m hurdles	13.66
2015	European Indoor Championships	Prague, Czech Republic	13th (sf)	60 m hurdles	7.73
2016	World Indoor Championships	Portland, United States	21st (h)	60 m hurdles	7.86
2016	European Championships	Amsterdam, Netherlands	14th (h)	110 m hurdles	13.87
2019	European Indoor Championships	Glasgow, United Kingdom	21st (h)	60 m hurdles	7.92
