= Mamoudou Hanne =

French sprinter (born 1988)

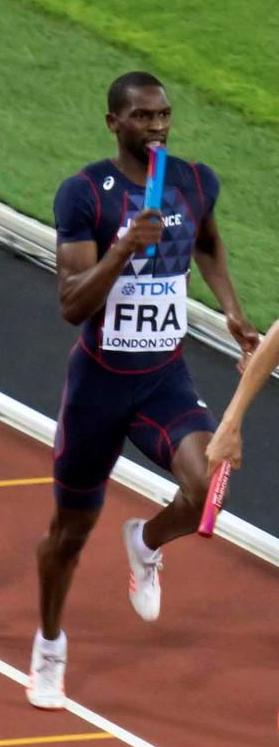
- Hanne in 2017

Personal information
- Full name: Mamoudou-Elimane Hanne
- Nationality: French
- Born: 6 March 1988 (age 38) Ségou, Mali
- Height: 186 cm (6 ft 1 in)
- Weight: 76 kg (168 lb)

Mamoudou-Elimane Hanne (born 6 March 1988 in Ségou, Mali) is a French, former Malian, sprint athlete.

== International competitions ==
Year	Competition	Venue	Position	Event	Notes
Representing Mali
2006	World Junior Championships	Beijing, China	46th (h)	400 m	49.56
2007	African Junior Championships	Ouagadougou, Burkina Faso	7th	400 m	48.81
2008	World Indoor Championships	Valencia, Spain	22nd (h)	400 m	48.44
Representing France
2010	European Championships	Barcelona, Spain	8th (h)	4 × 400 m relay	3:05.32
2011	European Indoor Championships	Paris, France	1st	4 × 400 m relay	3:06.17
2011	World Championships	Daegu, South Korea	14th (h)	4 × 400 m relay	3:03.68
2013	European Indoor Championships	Gothenburg, Sweden	8th	400 m	47.08
2013	Jeux de la Francophonie	Nice, France	6th	400 m	47.93
2013	Jeux de la Francophonie	Nice, France	1st	4 × 400 m relay	3:05.22
2014	European Championships	Zürich, Switzerland	3rd	4 × 400 m relay	2:59.89
2015	IAAF World Relays	Nassau, Bahamas	10th (h)	4 × 400 m relay	3:03.88
2015	World Championships	Beijing, China	6th	4 × 400 m relay	3:00.65
2017	IAAF World Relays	Nassau, Bahamas	8th	4 × 400 m relay	3:06.33
2017	World Championships	London, United Kingdom	29th (h)	400 m	45.89
2017	World Championships	London, United Kingdom	8th	4 × 400 m relay	3:01.79
2018	Mediterranean Games	Tarragona, Spain	3rd	400 m	46.35
