= Matteo Galvan =

Italian athlete (born 1988)

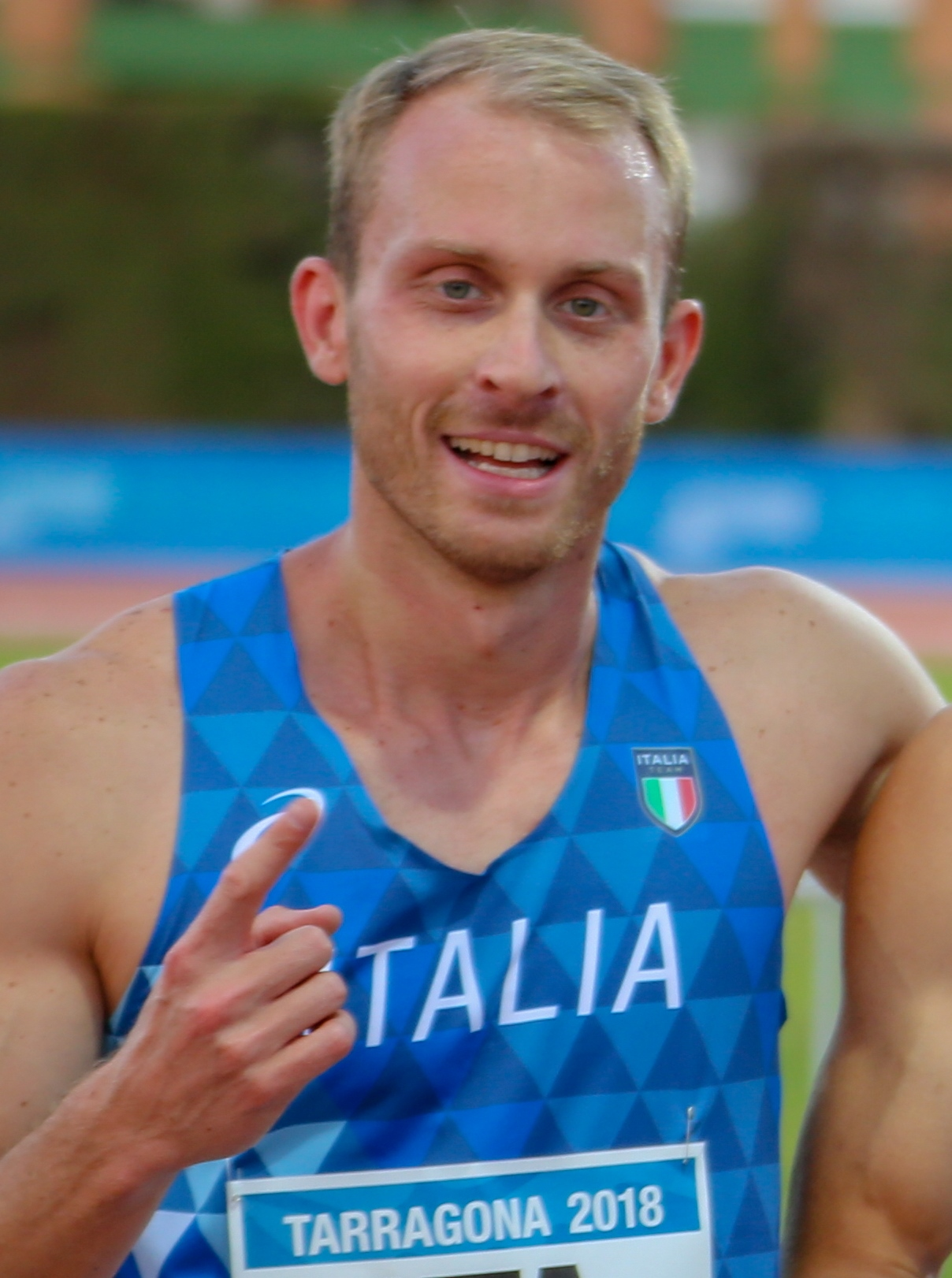
- Matteo Galvan in 2018

Personal information
- National team: Italy
- Born: 24 August 1988 (age 37) Vicenza, Italy
- Height: 1.83 m (6 ft 0 in)
- Weight: 73 kg (161 lb)

Sport
- Sport: Athletics
- Event: Sprints
- Club: G.S. Fiamme Gialle
- Coached by: Loren Seagrave

Achievements and titles
- Personal bests: 100 m: 10.38 (2011); 200 m: 20.62 (2009); 400 m: 45.12 (2016)
Medal record
European Indoor Championships
Gold medal – first place	2009 Turin	4 × 400 m relay
European Team Championships
Gold medal – first place	2019 Bydgoszcz	4 × 400 m relay
Mediterranean Games
Gold medal – first place	2013 Mersin	400 m
Gold medal – first place	2013 Mersin	4 × 400 m relay
Gold medal – first place	2018 Tarragona	4 × 400 m relay
Silver medal – second place	2009 Pescara	200 m
European U23 Championships
Silver medal – second place	2009 Kaunas	4 × 400 m relay
World Youth Championships
Bronze medal – third place	2005 Marrakesh	200 m

Matteo Galvan (born 24 August 1988) is an Italian athlete who specializes in the 200 and 400 metres. His career highlight so far is the 2009 European Indoor Championships, where he placed sixth in the 400 metres and won a gold medal in the relay.

He also won seven national championships at individual senior level from 2008 to 2016 in three different specialities of the sprinting (100, 200 and 400 metres).

== Biography ==
Galvan was born in Vicenza. He won the bronze medal in the 200 metres at the 2005 World Youth Championships, in a personal best time of 21.14 seconds. At the 2006 World Junior Championships he was named as one of the prime members of the Italian squad. He did reach the final round of the 200 metres, but was disqualified. He also competed in the 4 x 100 metres relay, but without reaching the final round. In 2006 he achieved personal best times in the 100 and 200 metres, with 10.54 and 20.87 seconds respectively, both times set in July in Rieti.

2007 and 2008 were low-key seasons for Galvan. He ran the 200 metres in 20.96 in June 2007, and the 400 metres in 47.10 in September 2007. He repeated this exact time in February 2008 in Genoa, during the indoor season.

In February 2009 he ran the 400 metres in 46.26, at the Italian indoor championships in Turin. At that time it was the third fastest time in Europe and the sixth fastest in the world during the 2008–09 indoor season. The 2009 European Indoor Championships was staged in the same city the next month, and, competing in the 400 metres, Galvan managed to place sixth in the final with the time 48.23. On the next day he won a gold medal in the 4 × 400 metres relay, together with teammates Jacopo Marin, Domenico Rao and Claudio Licciardello. Galvan ran the second leg.

== National record ==
- 400 metres: 45.12 (Rieti, june 2016). Current record established at the 2016 Italian Championships.

== Achievements ==
Year	Competition	Venue	Position	Event	Time	Notes
2005	World Youth Championships	Marrakesh, Morocco	3rd	200 m	21.14	
2006	World Junior Championships	Beijing, China	Final	200 m	DSQ	
2006	World Junior Championships	Beijing, China	19th (h)	4 × 100 m relay	41.59	
2009	European Indoor Championships	Turin, Italy	1st	4 × 400 m relay	3:06.68	
2009	European Indoor Championships	Turin, Italy	6th	400 m	47.45	
2009	Mediterranean Games	Pescara, Italy	2nd	200 m	20.92	
2009	European U23 Championships	Kaunas, Lithuania	4th	200 m	20.62	(wind: -0.2 m/s)
2009	European U23 Championships	Kaunas, Lithuania	2nd	4 × 400 m relay	3:03.79	
2013	Mediterranean Games	Mersin, Turkey	1st	400 m	45.59	
2013	Mediterranean Games	Mersin, Turkey	1st	4 × 400 m relay	3.04.61	SB
2015	European Indoor Championships	Prague, Czech Republic	6th	400 m	46.87	
2016	European Championships	Amsterdam, Netherlands	8th	400 m	45.80	
2018	Mediterranean Games	Tarragona, Spain	1st	4 × 400 m relay	3:03.54	
2018	European Championships	Berlin, Germany	SF (9th)	400 m	45.17	SB

== National titles ==
- Italian Athletics Championships
  - 100 metres: 2011
  - 200 metres: 2008
  - 400 metres: 2009, 2013, 2014, 2015, 2016, 2019

== See also ==
- Italian records in athletics
- Italian all-time lists - 400 metres
- Italy national relay team
