= Mame-Ibra Anne =

French sprinter

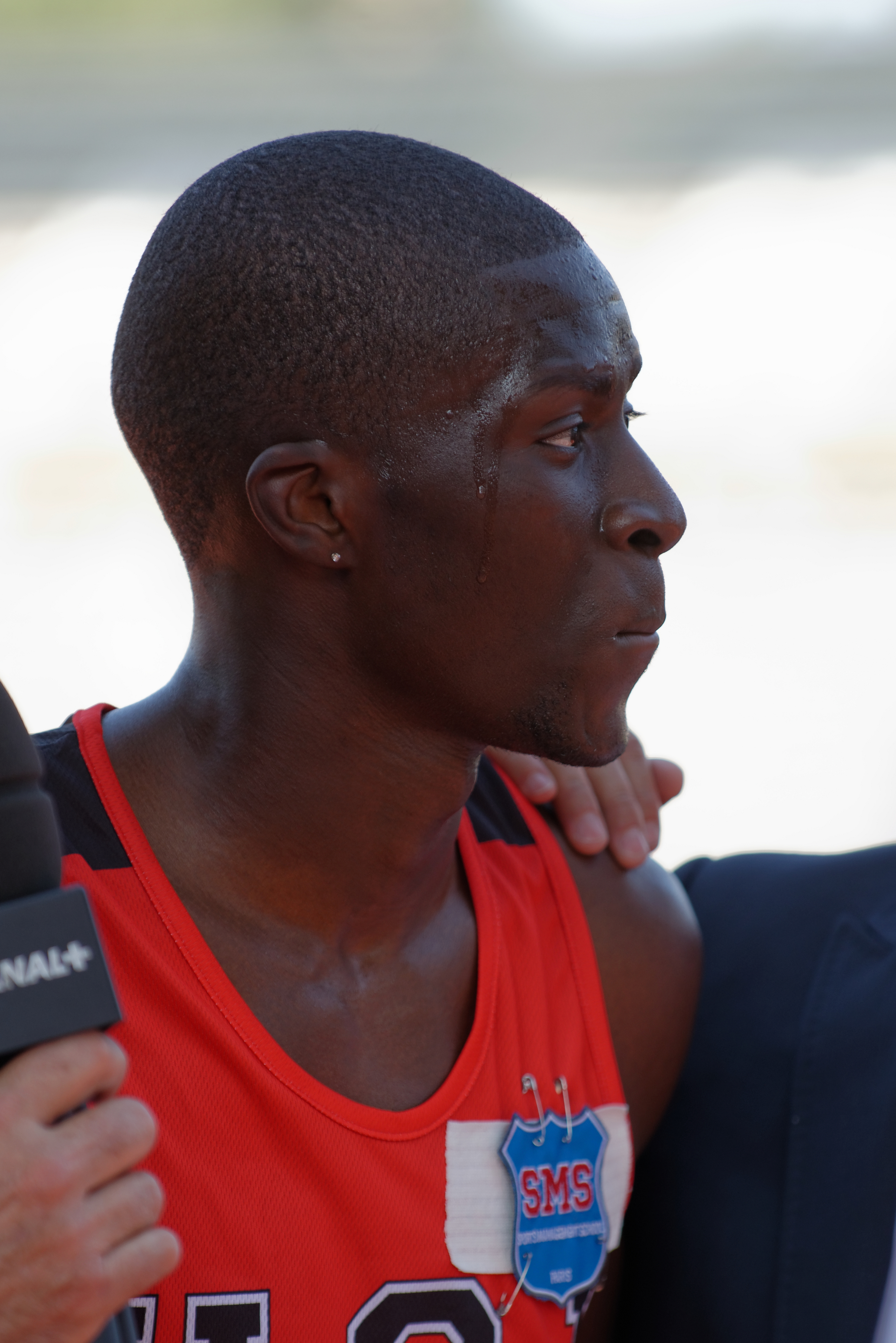
- Anne in 2013

Personal information
- Born: 7 November 1989 (age 36) Colombes, France
- Height: 1.84 m (6 ft 0 in)
- Weight: 72 kg (159 lb)

Sport
- Country: France
- Sport: Athletics (track and field)
- Event: 400 metres
- Club: Union Sportive Ivry Athlétisme
- Coached by: Marc Vecchio
Medal record
Men's athletics
Representing France
European Championships
Bronze medal – third place	2014 Zürich	4×400 m relay
European Indoor Championships
Bronze medal – third place	2019 Glasgow	4×400 m relay

Mame-Ibra Anne (born 7 November 1989 in Colombes) is a French sprinter specialising in the 400 metres. He won the bronze medal at the 2013 Mediterranean Games, as well as at the 2018 European Athletics Championships in the 4×400 meters relay race.

His personal bests in the event are 45.26 seconds outdoors (Cheboksary 2015) and 46.91 seconds indoors (Aubière 2013).

== Competition record ==
Year	Competition	Venue	Position	Event	Notes
Representing France
2009	European U23 Championships	Kaunas, Lithuania	13th (sf)	400 m	46.93
2009	European U23 Championships	Kaunas, Lithuania	3rd	4 × 400 m relay	3:04.06
2010	European Championships	Barcelona, Spain	6th	4 × 400 m relay	3:03.85
2011	European U23 Championships	Ostrava, Czech Republic	5th	400 m	46.32
2011	European U23 Championships	Ostrava, Czech Republic	4th	4 × 400 m relay	3:04.04
2012	European Championships	Helsinki, Finland	8th (h)	4 × 400 m relay	3:06.44
2013	Mediterranean Games	Mersin, Turkey	3rd	400 m	45.81
2014	World Relays	Nassau, Bahamas	10th (h)	4 × 400 m relay	3:03.74
2014	European Championships	Zürich, Switzerland	8th (sf)	400 m	45.79
2014	European Championships	Zürich, Switzerland	3rd	4 × 400 m relay	2:59.89
2015	World Relays	Nassau, Bahamas	10th (h)	4 × 400 m relay	3:03.88
2015	World Championships	Beijing, China	34th (h)	400 m	45.55
2015	World Championships	Beijing, China	6th	4 × 400 m relay	3:00.65
2016	European Championships	Amsterdam, Netherlands	7th	400 m	45.75
2016	Olympic Games	Rio de Janeiro, Brazil	9th (h)	4 × 400 m relay	3:00.82
2018	European Championships	Berlin, Germany	2nd (h)	4 × 400 m relay	3:01.67
2019	European Indoor Championships	Glasgow, United Kingdom	3rd	4 × 400 m relay	3:07.71
2019	World Relays	Yokohama, Japan	2nd (B)	4 × 400 m relay	3:02.99
2019	World Championships	Doha, Qatar	7th	4 × 400 m relay	3:03.06
