= Domenico Rao =

Italian sprinter

Personal information
- Nationality: Italian
- Born: June 11, 1977 (age 49) Catania, Italy
- Height: 1.80 m (5 ft 11 in)
- Weight: 76 kg (168 lb)

Sport
- Country: Italy
- Sport: Athletics
- Event: 400 metres
- Club: C.S. Carabinieri

Achievements and titles
- Personal bests: 400 m: 47.05 (2007); 400 m indoor: 47.20 (2009)
Medal record
European Indoor Championships
Gold medal – first place	2009 Torino	4 × 400 m

Domenico Rao (born 11 June 1977) is a male track and field sprinter from Italia who specializes in the 400 metres. His personal best time is 47.09 seconds, achieved in 1998.

== Biography ==
He won a gold medal in the 4 × 400 metres relay at the 2009 European Indoor Championships, together with teammates Jacopo Marin, Matteo Galvan and Claudio Licciardello.

== Achievements ==
Year	Competition	Venue	Position	Event	Notes
Representing Italy
1997	European U23 Championships	Turku, Finland	7th	4 × 400 m relay	3:08.00
2009	European Indoor Championships	Turin, Italy	1st	4 × 400 m relay	3:06.68

== See also ==
- Italy national relay team
