= Marco Vistalli =

Italian sprinter

Personal information
- Nationality: Italian
- Born: October 3, 1987 (age 38) Alzano Lombardo, Italy
- Height: 1.84 m (6 ft 1/2 in)
- Weight: 70 kg (154 lb)

Sport
- Country: Italy
- Sport: Athletics
- Event: 400 m
- Club: G.S. Fiamme Oro

Achievements and titles
- Personal best: 400 m: 45.38 (2010)
Medal record
Men's athletics
European U23 Championships
Silver medal – second place	Kaunas 2009	4 x 400 m relay
European Team Championships
Bronze medal – third place	Stockholm 2011	400 m

Marco Vistalli (born 3 October 1987 in Alzano Lombardo) is a former Italian sprinter, specializing in 400 metres.

== Biography ==
He was 3rd at 2011 European Team Championships in Stockholm. His personal best, on 400 metres, is 45"38 set in 2010 European Championships in Athletics in Barcelona.

== Achievements ==
Year	Competition	Venue	Position	Event	Notes
Representing Italy
2007	European U23 Championships	Debrecen, Hungary	9th (h)	4 × 400 m relay	3:11.51
2009	European U23 Championships	Kaunas, Lithuania	6th	400m	46.67
2009	European U23 Championships	Kaunas, Lithuania	2nd	4 × 400 m relay	3:03.79
2010	European Championships	Barcelona, Spain	8th	4 × 400 m	3:04.20
2011	European Team Championships	Stockholm, Sweden	3rd	400 m	45.99
2011	European Team Championships	Stockholm, Sweden	5th	4 × 400 m	3:05.66
2012	European Championships	Helsinki, Finland	8th	400 m	4:04.20

== See also ==
- Italian all-time lists - 400 metres
- Italy national relay team
