= 2006 World Junior Championships in Athletics – Men's 400 metres =

The men's 400 metres event at the 2006 World Junior Championships in Athletics was held in Beijing, China, at Chaoyang Sports Centre on 15, 16 and 17 August.

== Medalists ==
Gold	Renny Quow; Trinidad and Tobago
Silver	Justin Oliver; United States
Bronze	Martyn Rooney; United Kingdom

== Results ==
=== Final ===
17 August

Rank	Name	Nationality	Time	Notes
1st place, gold medalist(s)	Renny Quow	Trinidad and Tobago	45.74	
2nd place, silver medalist(s)	Justin Oliver	United States	45.78	
3rd place, bronze medalist(s)	Martyn Rooney	United Kingdom	45.87	
4	Jonathan Borlée	Belgium	46.06	
5	Edino Steele	Jamaica	46.42	
6	Allodin Fothergill	Jamaica	46.68	
7	Yuzo Kanemaru	Japan	46.70	
8	Andrew Dargie	Canada	46.87	

=== Semifinals ===
16 August

==== Semifinal 1 ====
Rank	Name	Nationality	Time	Notes
1	Yuzo Kanemaru	Japan	46.04	Q
2	Jonathan Borlée	Belgium	46.08	Q
3	Allodin Fothergill	Jamaica	46.68	q
4	Julius Kirwa	Kenya	46.76	
5	Niko Verekauta	Fiji	46.77	
6	Anton Kokorin	Russia	46.78	
7	Alvin Samuels	South Africa	47.21	
8	Yannick Fonsat	France	47.79	

==== Semifinal 2 ====
Rank	Name	Nationality	Time	Notes
1	Renny Quow	Trinidad and Tobago	46.18	Q
2	Justin Oliver	United States	46.22	Q
3	Grant Baker	United Kingdom	46.85	
4	Kevin Borlée	Belgium	46.95	
5	Victor Isaiah	Nigeria	46.98	
6	Aitor Martín	Spain	47.35	
7	Alex Bubner	Australia	47.43	
8	Mohamed Al-Rawahi	Oman	47.74	

==== Semifinal 3 ====
Rank	Name	Nationality	Time	Notes
1	Martyn Rooney	United Kingdom	46.01	Q
2	Andrew Dargie	Canada	46.45	Q
3	Edino Steele	Jamaica	46.55	q
4	Silvester Kirwa Meli	Kenya	46.84	
5	Quentin Summers	United States	47.04	
6	Dmitriy Buryak	Russia	47.24	
7	Reza Bouazar	Iran	47.25	
8	Dylan Grant	Australia	47.41	

=== Heats ===
15 August

==== Heat 1 ====
Rank	Name	Nationality	Time	Notes
1	Renny Quow	Trinidad and Tobago	45.91	Q
2	Julius Kirwa	Kenya	46.23	Q
3	Dmitriy Buryak	Russia	47.27	q
4	Todd Pyper	Canada	48.07	
5	Kenneth Serameng	Botswana	48.78	
6	Martin Hrstka	Czech Republic	49.61	
7	Li Jinlong	China	56.29	

==== Heat 2 ====
Rank	Name	Nationality	Time	Notes
1	Edino Steele	Jamaica	46.59	Q
2	Reza Bouazar	Iran	47.24	Q
3	Virender Kumar Pankaj	India	47.60	
4	Philippe Sébastien Djaovazaha	Madagascar	48.21	
5	Guo Jian	China	48.68	
6	Yonas Al-Hosah	Saudi Arabia	48.76	
7	Ismail Shaneem	Maldives	53.84	

==== Heat 3 ====
Rank	Name	Nationality	Time	Notes
1	Martyn Rooney	United Kingdom	46.25	Q
2	Victor Isaiah	Nigeria	47.20	Q
3	Alex Bubner	Australia	47.46	q
4	Joel Phillip	Grenada	47.59	
5	Abu Bakarr Camara	Sierra Leone	49.96	
6	Mohsen Zarinafzal	Iran	50.38	
7	Stevorn Richards	Saint Vincent and the Grenadines	51.64	

==== Heat 4 ====
Rank	Name	Nationality	Time	Notes
1	Quentin Summers	United States	47.24	Q
2	Alvin Samuels	South Africa	47.49	Q
3	László Bartha	Hungary	47.88	
4	Petr Vanek	Czech Republic	47.98	
5	Teo Turchi	Italy	48.66	
6	Christian Santiago	Puerto Rico	48.96	
	Juan Lewis	Bahamas	DQ	

==== Heat 5 ====
Rank	Name	Nationality	Time	Notes
1	Yuzo Kanemaru	Japan	46.53	Q
2	Grant Baker	United Kingdom	46.79	Q
3	Silvester Kirwa Meli	Kenya	47.04	q
4	Kevin Borlée	Belgium	47.07	q
5	Yoann Décimus	France	48.45	
6	Gayan Rathnayake	Sri Lanka	49.26	
	Arnold Sorina	Vanuatu	DQ	

==== Heat 6 ====
Rank	Name	Nationality	Time	Notes
1	Jonathan Borlée	Belgium	46.25	Q
2	Andrew Dargie	Canada	46.68	Q
3	Mohamed Al-Rawahi	Oman	47.05	q
4	Anton Kokorin	Russia	47.33	q
5	Bineesh V. Baby	India	48.60	
6	Sebastijan Jagarinec	Slovenia	48.68	
7	Mamoudou Hanne	Mali	49.56	
	Fernando López	Uruguay	DQ	

==== Heat 7 ====
Rank	Name	Nationality	Time	Notes
1	Aitor Martín	Spain	47.14	Q
2	Allodin Fothergill	Jamaica	47.15	Q
3	Niko Verekauta	Fiji	47.30	q
4	Tetsuji Yamamoto	Japan	47.52	
5	Jameson Strachan	Bahamas	49.07	
6	Stefanos Anastasiou	Cyprus	51.95	
	Moses Mlambo	Swaziland	DQ	
	Adam Al-Nour	Sudan	DNF	

==== Heat 8 ====
Rank	Name	Nationality	Time	Notes
1	Justin Oliver	United States	46.86	Q
2	Yannick Fonsat	France	47.24	Q
3	Dylan Grant	Australia	47.40	q
4	Pieter Smit	South Africa	47.89	
5	Abdel Bashar El-Farzdag	Sudan	48.26	
6	Amran Raj Krishnan	Malaysia	48.48	
7	Jesús Pérez	Spain	48.62	

== Participation ==
According to an unofficial count, 58 athletes from 40 countries participated in the event.

- Australia (2)
- Bahamas (2)
- Belgium (2)
- Botswana (1)
- Canada (2)
- China (2)
- Cyprus (1)
- Czech Republic (2)
- Fiji (1)
- France (2)
- Grenada (1)
- Hungary (1)
- India (2)
- Iran (2)
- Italy (1)
- Jamaica (2)
- Japan (2)
- Kenya (2)
- Madagascar (1)
- Malaysia (1)
- Maldives (1)
- Mali (1)
- Nigeria (1)
- Oman (1)
- Puerto Rico (1)
- Russia (2)
- Saint Vincent and the Grenadines (1)
- Saudi Arabia (1)
- Sierra Leone (1)
- Slovenia (1)
- South Africa (2)
- Spain (2)
- Sri Lanka (1)
- Sudan (2)
- Swaziland (1)
- Trinidad and Tobago (1)
- United Kingdom (2)
- United States (2)
- Uruguay (1)
- Vanuatu (1)
