= Callum Priestley =

British former track and field athlete (born 1989)

Personal information
- Nationality: British (English)
- Born: 13 February 1989 (age 37) London, England

Sport
- Sport: Athletics
- Event: Hurdles
- Club: Woodford Green with Essex Ladies
Medal record
Men's athletics
Representing Great Britain
European U23 Championships
| Bronze medal – third place | 2009 Kaunas | 110 m hurdles |

Callum Lindsay Priestley (born 13 February 1989) is a retired track and field athlete from England who specialised in sprint hurdling. Priestley served a two-year competition ban from 2010 to 2012 for violating anti-doping rules after testing positive for clenbuterol.

== Biography ==
Priestley began competing in athletics while at school and finished second in the 110 metres hurdles at the 2005 English Schools' Athletic Association Championships. Progressing through the ranks at youth level, he represented Great Britain at the 2007 European Athletics Junior Championships and reached the hurdles final, although he did not finish the race.

The 2009 season proved to be a breakthrough at national level as he took third in the 60 metres hurdles at the UK Indoor Championships. He followed this with second-place finishes outdoors at the England U23 Championships and the UK World Trials/National Championships. At the 2009 European Athletics U23 Championships he won the bronze medal behind Artur Noga and compatriot Gianni Frankis, running a personal best time of 13.63 seconds. A win at the McCain UK Challenge Final in Cardiff meant he earned a share of the £5000 jackpot as he won his race and topped the event rankings in the national competition. He gained lottery funding at the end of the year as part of the 2012 London Olympics development programme.

The next season, he became the national champion indoors with a 60 m hurdles win in Sheffield.

== Anti-doping rules violation ==
Whilst training at UK Athletics winter camp in South Africa in January 2020, Priestly failed out-of-competition drugs test where the prohibited substance clenbuterol was found in his system. He was provisionally suspended in February 2010. During an investigation, Priestley was unable to prove how he had ingested clenbuterol unintentionally and he was subsequently served with a two-year competition ban in September 2010 that was in effect until February 2012. His ban also included a lifetime competition ban for representing Great Britain at the Olympics.
