= Yoann Décimus =

French sprinter

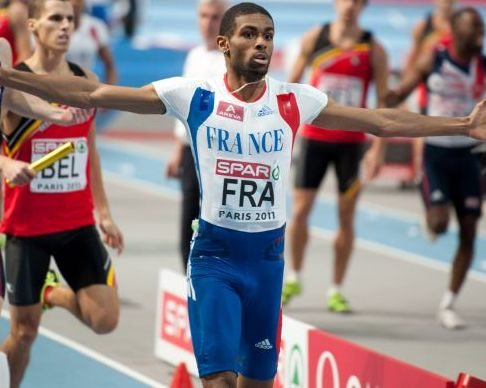
- Décimus at the 2011 European Indoor Championships.

Personal information
- Born: 30 November 1987 (age 37) Paris, France

Sport
- Country: France
- Sport: Track and field
- Event: Sprints

Yoann Décimus (born 30 November 1987 in Paris) is a French sprint athlete.

== Achievements ==
Year	Competition	Venue	Position	Event	Notes
Representing France
2006	World Junior Championships	Beijing, China	34th (h)	400 m	48.45
2006	World Junior Championships	Beijing, China	8th (h)	4 × 400 m relay	3:07.76
2007	European Indoor Championships	Birmingham, United Kingdom	4th	4 × 400 m relay	3:10.15
2007	European U23 Championships	Debrecen, Hungary	12th (sf)	400m	47.32
2007	European U23 Championships	Debrecen, Hungary	—	4 × 400 m relay	DQ
2009	European Indoor Championships	Turin, Italy	8th (sf)	400 m	47.78
2009	European Indoor Championships	Turin, Italy	6th	4 × 400 m relay	3:11.27
2009	European U23 Championships	Kaunas, Lithuania	5th	400m	46.37
2009	European U23 Championships	Kaunas, Lithuania	3rd	4 × 400 m relay	3:04.06
2009	World Championships	Berlin, Germany	7th	4 × 400 m relay	3:02.65
2010	European Championships	Barcelona, Spain	4th (h)	4 × 400 m relay	3:05.32
2011	European Indoor Championships	Paris, France	6th	400 m	46.91
2011	European Indoor Championships	Paris, France	1st	4 × 400 m relay	3:06.17
2011	World Championships	Daegu, South Korea	14th (h)	4 × 400 m relay	3:03.68
2013	World Championships	Moscow, Russia	26th (h)	400 m hurdles	50.21
2013	Jeux de la Francophonie	Nice, France	2nd	400 m hurdles	50.05
2013	Jeux de la Francophonie	Nice, France	1st	4 × 400 m relay	3:05.22
2014	European Championships	Zürich, Switzerland	13th (sf)	400 m hurdles	49.71
2017	European Indoor Championships	Belgrade, Serbia	10th (sf)	400 m	47.87
2017	European Indoor Championships	Belgrade, Serbia	4th	4 × 400 m relay	3:08.99
