= Claudio Licciardello =

Italian sprinter

Personal information
- Nationality: Italian
- Born: January 11, 1986 (age 40) Catania, Italy
- Height: 1.86 m (6 ft 1 in)
- Weight: 73 kg (161 lb)

Sport
- Country: Italy
- Sport: Athletics
- Event: 400 metres
- Club: G.S. Fiamme Gialle

Achievements and titles
- Personal best: 400 m: 45.25 (2008)
Medal record
European Indoor Championships
Gold medal – first place	2009 Torino	4 × 400 m
Silver medal – second place	2009 Torino	400 m
European Cup
Silver medal – second place	2008 Annecy	400 m

Claudio Licciardello (born 11 January 1986 in Catania) is a track and field sprinter from Italy, who specializes in the 400 metres. His personal best time is 45.25 seconds, achieved in the heats at the 2008 Olympics in Beijing.

== Biography ==
At the 2009 European Indoor Championships he won the silver medal in the 400 metres, and a gold medal in the 4 × 400 metres relay together with teammates Jacopo Marin, Matteo Galvan and Domenico Rao. He also competed at the 2004 World Junior Championships, the 2006 European Championships and the 2008 Olympic Games without reaching the final.

== Achievements ==
Year	Competition	Venue	Position	Event	Notes
2004	World Junior Championships	Grosseto, Italy	19th (sf)	400 m	48.19
2004	World Junior Championships	Grosseto, Italy	10th (h)	4 × 400 m relay	3:10.48
2006	European Championships	Gothenburg, Sweden	14th (sf)	400 m	46.21
2006	European Championships	Gothenburg, Sweden	10th (h)	4 × 400 m relay	3:05.53
2008	Olympic Games	Beijing, China	23rd (sf)	400 m	45.64
2009	European Indoor Championships	Turin, Italy	2nd	400 m	46.32
2009	European Indoor Championships	Turin, Italy	1st	4 × 400 m relay	3:06.68
2010	European Championships	Barcelona, Spain	8th	4 × 400 m relay	3:04.20
2012	European Championships	Helsinki, Finland	9th (h)	4 × 400 m relay	3:08.78

== See also ==
- Italian all-time lists - 400 metres
- Italy national relay team
