= Jacopo Marin =

Italian sprinter

Personal information
- Nationality: Italian
- Born: March 24, 1984 (age 42) Grado, Italy

Sport
- Country: Italy
- Sport: Athletics
- Event: 400 metres

Achievements and titles
- Personal bests: 400 m: 47.23 (2002); 400 m indoor: 47.30 (2009)
Medal record
European Indoor Championships
| Gold medal – first place | 2009 Torino | 4 × 400 m |

Jacopo Marin (born 24 March 1984 in Grado) is a former sprinter from Italy who specialized in the 400 metres.

== Biography ==
His personal best time is 46.99 seconds, achieved in Velenje (Slovenia). He won a gold medal in the 4 × 400 metres relay at the 2009 European Indoor Championships, together with teammates Matteo Galvan, Domenico Rao and Claudio Licciardello.

== Achievements ==
| Year | Competition | Venue | Position | Event | Notes |
Representing Italy
| 2002 | World Junior Championships | Kingston, Jamaica | 19th (sf) | 400 m | 47.71 |
| 2009 | European Indoor Championships | (Italy) Turin | 1st | 4 × 400 m relay | 3:06.68 |
