= 2011 European Athletics U23 Championships – Men's 4 × 400 metres relay =

The Men's 4x400 metres relay event at the 2011 European Athletics U23 Championships was held in Ostrava, Czech Republic, at Městský stadion on 16 and 17 July.

== Medalists ==
Gold	Nigel Levine; Thomas Phillips; Jamie Bowie; Luke Lennon-Ford; Louis Persent^{†} Harry Doran^{†} United Kingdom
Silver	Michał Pietrzak; Jakub Krzewina; Łukasz Krawczuk; Mateusz Fórmański; Marcin Grynkiewicz^{†} Rafał Omelko^{†} Poland
Bronze	Aleksey Kenig; Anton Volobuyev; Artem Vazhov; Vladimir Krasnov; Artem Lukyanenko^{†} Russia

^{†}: Competed only in heat.

== Results ==
=== Final ===
17 July 2011 / 19:05

Rank	Name	Nationality	Lane	Reaction Time	Time	Notes
1st place, gold medalist(s)	United Kingdom	Nigel Levine; Thomas Phillips; Jamie Bowie; Luke Lennon-Ford	4	0.172	3:03.53	
2nd place, silver medalist(s)	Poland	Michał Pietrzak; Jakub Krzewina; Łukasz Krawczuk; Mateusz Fórmański	3	0.197	3:03.62	
3rd place, bronze medalist(s)	Russia	Aleksey Kenig; Anton Volobuyev; Artem Vazhov; Vladimir Krasnov	6	0.223	3:04.01	
4	France	Angel Chelala; Martial Minyem; Mame-Ibra Anne; Hugo Grillas	8	0.176	3:04.04	
5	Germany	Niklas Zender; Benjamin Jonas; Benedikt Wiesend; Marco Kaiser	5	0.204	3:04.93	
6	Spain	Javier Sanz; Samuel García; Marc Orozco; Pablo Fernández	7	0.181	3:07.58	
7	Latvia	Kārlis Daube; Jānis Baltušs; Mārtiņš Začests; Jānis Leitis	2	0.159	3:08.42	
8	Italy	Andrea Gallina; Giacomo Panizza; Domenico Fontana; Francesco Cappellin	1	0.182	3:09.07	

=== Heats ===
Qualified: First 3 in each heat (Q) and 2 best performers (q) advance to the Final

==== Summary ====
Rank	Nation	Time	Notes
1	Germany	3:05.69	Q
2	Poland	3:05.96	Q
3	United Kingdom	3:06.77	Q
4	Russia	3:07.79	Q
5	Spain	3:08.28	Q
6	Latvia	3:08.72	q
7	France	3:09.77	Q
8	Italy	3:12.12	q
9	Switzerland	3:15.11	
	Ukraine	DNF	

==== Details ====
===== Heat 1 =====
16 July 2011 / 11:50

Rank	Nation	Competitors	Lane	Reaction Time	Time	Notes
1	United Kingdom	Louis Persent; Thomas Phillips; Harry Doran; Jamie Bowie	6	0.188	3:06.77	Q
2	Russia	Aleksey Kenig; Artem Lukyanenko; Anton Volobuyev; Artem Vazhov	2	0.217	3:07.79	Q
3	Spain	Javier Sanz; Samuel García; Pablo Fernández; Marc Orozco	5	0.183	3:08.28	Q
4	Latvia	Kārlis Daube; Jānis Baltušs; Mārtiņš Začests; Jānis Leitis	3	0.154	3:08.72	q
	Ukraine	Denys Teslenko; Oleh Kayafa; Artem Kazban; Vitaliy Butrym	4	0.212	DNF	

===== Heat 2 =====
16 July 2011 / 11:58

Rank	Nation	Competitors	Lane	Reaction Time	Time	Notes
1	Germany	Benedikt Wiesend; Benjamin Jonas; Niklas Zender; Marco Kaiser	4	0.194	3:05.69	Q
2	Poland	Marcin Grynkiewicz; Jakub Krzewina; Łukasz Krawczuk; Rafał Omelko	6	0.177	3:05.96	Q
3	France	Angel Chelala; Martial Minyem; Simon Thieury; Brice Leroy	2	0.176	3:09.77	Q
4	Italy	Domenico Fontana; Giacomo Panizza; Andrea Gallina; Francesco Cappellin	5	0.214	3:12.12	q
5	Switzerland	Daniele Angelella; Jonathan Puemi; Silvan Lutz; Kariem Hussein	3	0.154	3:15.11	

== Participation ==
According to an unofficial count, 47 athletes from 10 countries participated in the event.

- France (6)
- Germany (4)
- Italy (4)
- Latvia (4)
- Poland (6)
- Russia (5)
- Spain (4)
- Switzerland (4)
- Ukraine (4)
- United Kingdom (6)
