= Antoine Gillet =

Belgian sprinter (born 1988)

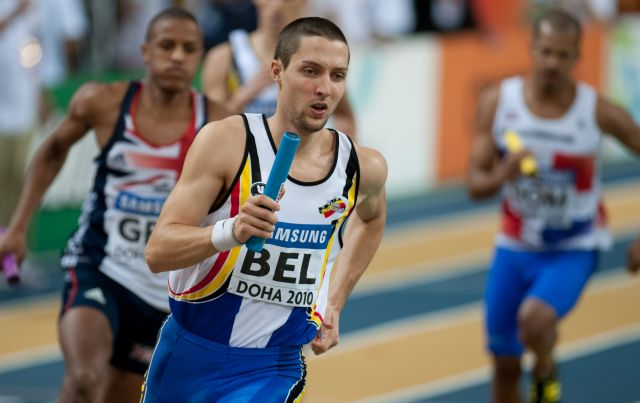
- Gillet in 2010

Personal information
- Born: 22 March 1988 (age 38) Libramont-Chevigny, Belgium
- Height: 1.85 m (6 ft 1 in)
- Weight: 73 kg (161 lb)

Sport
- Country: Belgium
- Sport: Athletics
- Event: 4 × 400 m Relay
Medal record
World Indoor Championships
| Silver medal – second place | 2010 Doha | 4 × 400 m relay |
European Championships
| Gold medal – first place | 2012 Helsinki | 4 × 400 m relay |
| Bronze medal – third place | 2010 Barcelona | 4 × 400 m relay |
European Indoor Championships
| Bronze medal – third place | 2011 Paris | 4 × 400 m relay |

Antoine Gillet (born 22 March 1988, Libramont-Chevigny) is a Belgian sprint athlete. He was part of Belgium's 4 × 400 m relay team at the 2012 Summer Olympics.

== Achievements ==
| Year | Competition | Venue | Position | Event | Notes |
Representing Belgium
| 2009 | European U23 Championships | Kaunas, Lithuania | 4th | 400 m | 46.13 |
| 2009 | European U23 Championships | Kaunas, Lithuania | 4th | 4 × 400 m relay | 3:04.51 |
| 2009 | Universiade | Belgrade, Serbia | 4th | 4 × 400 m relay | 3:06.61 |
| 2009 | World Championships | Berlin, Germany | 4th | 4 × 400 m relay | 3:01.88 |
| 2010 | World Indoor Championships | Doha, Qatar | 2nd | 4 × 400 m relay | 3:06.94 |
| 2010 | European Championships | Barcelona, Spain | 3rd | 4 × 400 m relay | 3:03.49 (h) |
| 2011 | European Indoor Championships | Paris, France | 3rd | 4 × 400 m relay | 3:06.57 |
| 2011 | Universiade | Shenzhen, China | 19th (sf) | 400 m | 47.37 |
| 2011 | World Championships | Daegu, South Korea | 5th | 4 × 400 m relay | 3:00.41 |
| 2012 | European Championships | Helsinki, Finland | 1st | 4 × 400 m relay | 3:01.09 (EL) |
| 2015 | World Championships | Beijing, China | 5th | 4 × 400 m relay | 3:00.24 |

== See also ==
- Belgian men's 4 × 400 metres relay team
