= Gianni Frankis =

British former athlete

Personal information
- Born: 16 April 1988 Rochford, Essex, England
- Height: 1.90 m (6 ft 3 in)
- Weight: 77 kg (170 lb)

Sport
- Sport: Athletics
- Event: 110 m hurdles
- Club: Newham and Essex Beagles A.C.
- Coached by: Tony Jarrett
Association football career
- Position: Forward
Youth career
- Benfleet
Senior career*
Years	Team	Apps	(Gls)
- Bowers & Pitsea
- Great Wakering Rovers
- Heybridge Swifts
2020	Rochford Town	4	(0)
2021–2023	Runwell Sports	41	(20)
2023–2024	Rayleigh Town	21	(17)
2024	Runwell Sports	9	(5)
2024–2025	Benfleet	20	(6)
- * Club domestic league appearances and goals

Gianni Joseph Frankis (born 16 April 1988) is a British born Italian former athlete who specialised in the sprint hurdles.

== Biography ==
=== Athletics career ===
Frankis was born in Rochford, Essex and represented Great Britain at the 2009 World Championships without advancing from the first round. In addition, he won several medals at age-group competitions.

In 2016, he switched allegiance from Great Britain to Italy.

His personal bests are 13.54 seconds in the 110 metres hurdles (+2.0 m/s, Newham 2013) and 7.67 seconds in the 60 metres hurdles (Vienna 2013).

=== Football career ===
Prior to focusing on athletics, Frankis played youth football for Benfleet, before making his first foray into senior football with Bowers & Pitsea at the age of 16, playing in the Essex Senior League. Frankis later played for Great Wakering Rovers and Heybridge Swifts, before focusing on athletics at the age of 18.

Frankis later returned to football, playing Essex Olympian League sides Rochford Town and Runwell Sports, before joining Rayleigh Town, helping the club gain promotion from the Essex Olympian League in 2024, scoring 20 goals in all competitions in the process. During the 2024–25 season, Frankis played for Benfleet and Runwell Sports.

== International competitions ==
Year	Competition	Venue	Position	Event	Notes
Representing Great Britain
2005	World Youth Championships	Marrakesh, Morocco	3rd	110 m hurdles (91.4 cm)	13.48
2006	World Junior Championships	Beijing, China	7th	110 m hurdles	13.71
2007	European Junior Championships	Hengelo, Netherlands	3rd	110 m hurdles (99 cm)	13.47
2009	European U23 Championships	Kaunas, Lithuania	2nd	110 m hurdles	13.57
2009	World Championships	Berlin, Germany	36th (h)	110 m hurdles	13.83
2011	Universiade	Shenzhen, China	7th	110 m hurdles	13.79
2011	Universiade	Shenzhen, China	5th	4 × 400 m relay	3:08.68
2012	European Championships	Helsinki, Finland	17th (sf)	110 m hurdles	13.68
