= Conrad Williams (athlete) =

British sprinter (born 1982)

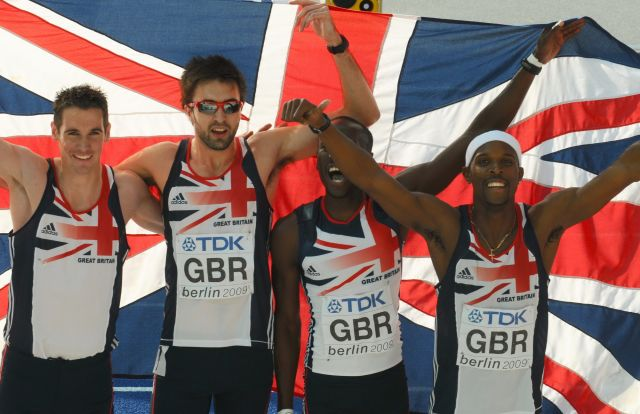
- Conrad Williams (right) with the GB 4 × 400 m team at the World Championships in 2009

Personal information
- Nationality: British/Jamaican
- Born: 20 March 1982 (age 44) Kingston, Jamaica
- Height: 1.82 m (5 ft 11 1/2 in)
- Weight: 75 kg (165 lb)

Sport
- Sport: Athletics
- Event: Sprints
- Club: Kent AC
Medal record
Men's athletics
Representing Great Britain
World Championships
Silver medal – second place	2009 Berlin	4 × 400 m relay
World Indoor Championships
Silver medal – second place	2012 Istanbul	4 × 400 m relay
Silver medal – second place	2014 Sopot	4 × 400 m relay
Bronze medal – third place	2010 Doha	4 × 400 m relay
European Championships
Gold medal – first place	2014 Zurich	4 × 400 m relay
Silver medal – second place	2010 Barcelona	4 × 400 m relay
Silver medal – second place	2012 Helsinki	4 × 400 m relay
Representing England
Commonwealth Games
Gold medal – first place	2014 Glasgow	4 × 400 m relay
Bronze medal – third place	2010 Delhi	4 × 400 m relay

Conrad Williams (born 20 March 1982) is a British former track and field sprinter who competed in the 400 metres and 4 × 400 m relay. He participated in the 2012 Summer Olympics.

== Biography ==
Born in Kingston, Jamaica, the majority of his success has come in relay events, where he has won eight senior international medals, including the gold medal for both England at the 2014 Commonwealth Games, and for Great Britain at the 2014 European Athletics Championships.

He holds a personal best of 45.02 seconds for the individual event.

At the 2012 London Olympics, although he did not advance beyond the semi-finals in the 400 m, he was part of the British team that came fourth in the men's 4 × 400 m.

He is a resident in Hither Green, Lewisham.

== Personal bests ==
Event	Time (seconds)	Place	Date
60 metres (indoor)	6.90	Eton, United Kingdom	7 February 2009
100 metres	10.40	Geneva, Switzerland	2 June 2012
200 metres	20.96	La Chaux-de-Fonds, Switzerland	3 July 2011
300 metres	34.00	Tonbridge, United Kingdom	28 March 2007
400 metres	45.08	Geneva, Switzerland	2 June 2012
