= Józef Lisowski =

Polish sprinting coach (born 1956)

Józef Lisowski (born 16 March 1956 in Wrocław) is a Polish sprinting coach. He is considered the father of the successes of the Polish men's national 4 × 400 m relay, especially in the late 1990s and early 2000s, which as of 2016 he still coaches.

Himself a former sprinter, he began coaching in 1979. Since 1994 he is the national head coach of the men's 4 × 400 m relay team. Under his guidance the Polish long relay began to achieve similar level of success as in the late 1960s. The greatest of these was winning the gold medal at the 1999 World Championships after the US relay was disqualified for doping, and beating team USA at the 2001 World Indoor Championships for the gold medal. They also won bronze medals at the World Championships in 1997, 2001, 2003 as well as two silver (1998, 2006) and bronze (2003) medals at the World Indoor Championships. The Olympic medals became the team's and Lisowski's, bane of the existence. After Robert Maćkowiak tripped over a cone placed too close to the 8th lane in the 2000 Olympic final, the Poles also failed to win a medal during their following two attempts. In total, Lisowski's relays participated in four Olympic and seven World Championships finals. Among his best trainees were Robert Maćkowiak and Tomasz Czubak who were the first Polish sprinters to go under 45 seconds.

In Lisowski's honour, Polish 400-metre runners are often called "Lisowczycy" which was the name of 17th-century Polish cavalry units.
