= Michał Pietrzak =

Polish sprinter and hurdler

Personal information
- Full name: Michał Waldemar Pietrzak
- Born: 3 April 1989 (age 37) Łęczyca, Poland
- Education: Jerzy Kukuczka Academy of Physical Education
- Height: 1.85 m (6 ft 1 in)
- Weight: 80 kg (176 lb)

Sport
- Club: AZS-AWF Katowice
- Coached by: Janusz Iskra
Medal record
Men's athletics
Representing Poland
European Championships
Silver medal – second place	2016 Amsterdam	4 x 400 m
Bronze medal – third place	2014 Zürich	4 x 400 m
European U23 Championships
Gold medal – first place	2009 Kaunas	4 x 400 m
Silver medal – second place	2011 Ostrava	4 x 400 m
Universiade
Bronze medal – third place	2015 Gwangju	4 × 400 m

Michał Pietrzak (Polish pronunciation: [ˈmixaw ˈpjɛtʂak]; born 3 April 1989) is a retired Polish athlete who specialised in the 400 metres and 400 metres hurdles. He won two medals in the 4 × 400 metres relay at the European Athletics Championships.

== Personal life ==
Pietrzak was born on 3 April 1989 in Łęczyca. His parents, Waldemar and Jolanta, are both physical education teachers. He attended the Jerzy Kukuczka Academy of Physical Education in Katowice. In 2016, he completed his MA thesis in physical education.

== Career ==
Pietrzak competed in the 4 × 400 m relay event at the 2012 Summer Olympics in London. At the 2013 Indoor European Championships in Gothenburg, his team lost the relay bronze medal due to disqualification; it was judged that one of his teammates had pushed British athlete Richard Buck.

Competing in the 4 × 400 m relay, Pietrzak placed fourth at the 2014 World Indoor Championships in Sopot and took the bronze medal at the 2014 European Championships in Zürich. They won silver at the 2016 European Championships in Amsterdam. In 2016 Pietrzak ran the 400 m in 45.96.

He and his teammates qualified to the 4 × 400 metres relay final at the 2016 Summer Olympics in Rio de Janeiro, Brazil, finishing in 7th place.

== Competition record ==
Year	Competition	Venue	Position	Event	Notes
Representing Poland
2008	World Junior Championships	Bydgoszcz, Poland	14th (sf)	400 m hurdles	52.22
2008	World Junior Championships	Bydgoszcz, Poland	5th	4 × 400 m relay	3:08.65
2009	European U23 Championships	Kaunas, Lithuania	1st	4 × 400 m relay	3:03.74
2011	European U23 Championships	Ostrava, Czech Republic	15th (sf)	400 m hurdles	51.76
2011	European U23 Championships	Ostrava, Czech Republic	2nd	4 × 400 m relay	3:03.62
2012	European Championships	Zürich, Switzerland	4th (h)	4 × 400 m relay	3:05.69
2012	Olympic Games	London, United Kingdom	9th (h)	4 × 400 m relay	3:02.86
2013	European Indoor Championships	Gothenburg, Sweden	–	4 × 400 m relay	DQ
2014	World Indoor Championships	Sopot, Poland	4th	4 × 400 m relay	3:04.39
2014	European Championships	Zürich, Switzerland	5th (h)	4 × 400 m relay	3:03.52
2015	IAAF World Relays	Nassau, Bahamas	9th	4 × 400 m relay	3:03.23
2015	Universiade	Gwangju, South Korea	3rd	4 × 400 m relay	3:07.77
2015	World Championships	Beijing, China	11th (h)	4 × 400 m relay	3:00.72
2016	European Championships	Amsterdam, Netherlands	2nd	4 × 400 m relay	3:02.09
2016	Olympic Games	Rio de Janeiro, Brazil	7th	4 × 400 m relay	3:00.50
2017	Universiade	Taipei, Taiwan	–	4 × 400 m relay	DNF
