= Jan Ciepiela =

Polish sprinter (born 1989)

Personal information
- Born: 21 January 1989 (age 37) Świętochłowice, Poland

Sport
- Sport: Athletics
- Event: 400 metres
- Club: AZS–AWF Kraków
- Coached by: Lech Salamonowicz
Medal record
Men's athletics
Representing Poland
European U23 Championships
Gold medal – first place	2009 Kaunas	4 x 400 m
Bronze medal – third place	2011 Ostrava	400 m

Jan Ciepiela (born 21 January 1989 in Świętochłowice) is a retired Polish sprinter who specialised in the 400 metres. He represented his country at the 2009 World Championships finishing fifth in the 4 × 400 metres relay. In addition he won two medals at the 2009 European U23 Championships.

== International competitions ==
Year	Competition	Venue	Position	Event	Notes
Representing Poland
2007	European Junior Championships	Hengelo, Netherlands	2nd (h)	4 × 400 m relay	3:08.17^{1}
2009	European Indoor Championships	Turin, Italy	7th (sf)	400 m	47.54
2009	European Indoor Championships	Turin, Italy	3rd	4 × 400 m relay	3:07.04
2009	European U23 Championships	Kaunas, Lithuania	3rd	400 m	45.81
2009	European U23 Championships	Kaunas, Lithuania	1st	4 × 400 m relay	3:03.74
2009	World Championships	Berlin, Germany	5th	4 × 400 m relay	3:02.23
2010	European Championships	Barcelona, Spain	5th (h)	4 × 400 m relay	3:04.51
2012	European Championships	Helsinki, Finland	4th	4 × 400 m relay	3:02.37

^{1}Disqualified in the final

== Personal bests ==
Outdoor

- 200 metres – 21.45 (+0.7 m/s, Sosnowiec 2014)
- 400 metres – 45.81 (Kaunas 2009)

Indoor

- 200 metres – 21.60 (Spała 2014)
- 400 metres – 46.72 (Turin 2009)
