= Isalbet Juarez =

Italian sprinter (born 1987)

Personal information
- Nationality: Italian
- Born: 20 December 1987 (age 38) Havana, Cuba
- Height: 1.84 m (6 ft 1/2 in)
- Weight: 72 kg (159 lb)

Sport
- Country: Italy
- Sport: Athletics
- Event: Sprint
- Club: G.S. Fiamme Oro
- Coached by: Umberto Pegoraro

Achievements and titles
- Personal best: 400 m: 46.64 (2012)
Medal record
Mediterranean Games
Gold medal – first place	2013 Mersin	4×400 m relay
European U23 Championships
Silver medal – second place	2009 Kaunas	4×400 m relay

Isalbet Juarez (born 20 December 1987) is an Italian sprinter, specialized in the 400 metres.

== Biography ==
Isalbet Juarez, born and lived in Cuba till he was eleven years old, won a medal at the 2013 Mediterranean Games.

== Achievements ==
Year	Competition	Venue	Position	Event	Notes
Representing Italy
2007	European U23 Championships	Debrecen, Hungary	16th (h)	400m	47.42
2007	European U23 Championships	Debrecen, Hungary	9th (h)	4 × 400 m relay	3:11.51
2009	European U23 Championships	Kaunas, Lithuania	22nd (h)	400m	48.31
2009	European U23 Championships	Kaunas, Lithuania	2nd	4 × 400 m relay	3:03.79
2013	Mediterranean Games	Mersin, Turkey	1st	4 × 400 m relay	3.04.61

== National titles ==
He has won 1 time the individual national championship.

- 1 win in 400 metres indoor (2013)

== See also ==
- Italy at the 2013 Mediterranean Games
