= Vladimir Zhukov =

Russian serial killer and child rapist (born 1972)

- Born: Vladimir Sergeevich Zhukov; 20 June 1972 (age 54); Yaroslavl, Yaroslavl Oblast, Russian SFSR, USSR
- Other names: "The Nizhegorodsky Chikatilo" "The Riding Maniac" "The Touring Maniac" "The Nizhny Novgorod Maniac" "The New Chikatilo"
- Conviction: Murder
- Penalty: Life imprisonment

Details
- Victims: 3–4
- Span of crimes: 2002–2006
- Country: Russia
- State: Nizhny Novgorod
- Date apprehended: 23 August 2007
- Imprisoned at: White Swan, Solikamsk, Perm Krai

Vladimir Sergeevich Zhukov (Russian: Владимир Сергеевич Жуков; born 20 June 1972), known as The Nizhegorodsky Chikatilo (Russian: Нижегородский Чикатило), is a Russian serial killer, rapist and pedophile.

== Biography ==
Zhukov was a radio engineer by trade, working in the Nizhny Novgorod branch of the Russian division as an international telephone operator. Due to the nature of his job, he often went on business trips to various cities in Russia. He was married, and he and his wife were raising a foster child.

Between 1999 and 2007, Zhukov abducted and raped girls aged between 7 and 12 years. In January 2003, he committed three rapes in Novosibirsk during a business trip, but this could not be proven due to none of the victims being located. In August 2004, he killed a 9-year-old boy and 12-year-old girl in the Bogorodsky District. On 24 June 2006, he kidnapped and killed a 9-year-old girl in the village of Voskresenskoye, throwing her body into a lake outside Nizhny Novgorod. In August 2007, he was arrested: one of his rape victims managed to memorize the car as well as the view from the window of Zhukov's apartment. After his detention, he confessed to 26, and then 32 total crimes committed in Nizhny Novgorod, Novosibirsk and Yaroslavl. He was investigated for involvement in similar crimes in other cities, where he traveled on business trips.

On 15 September 2008, the Nizhny Novgorod Regional Court found Vladimir Zhukov guilty of three murders and 11 rapes and sentenced him to life imprisonment. In addition, the court decided that the convicted should pay 2.8 million rubles in compensation to the victims' families. On 28 April 2009, he was sentenced by the Novosibirsk Regional Court to 11 years' imprisonment for 3 rapes committed in Novosibirsk in January 2003. This verdict was incorporated into the life imprisonment. It is suggested that Zhukov committed many more crimes in several regions in Russia.

He is serving his sentence in the White Swan prison. In September 2010, he confessed to the abduction of a girl of 8–10 years in 2002 in the city of Gorodets, followed by a rape and murder in the Koverninsky District.

== See also ==
- List of Russian serial killers
