= Yannick Fonsat =

French sprinter (born 1988)

Yannick Fonsat (born 16 June 1988 in Paris, France) is a French sprinter who specialises in the 400 meters. He was the 2007 European Junior Champion at 400 metres. As French junior champion, he had run at the 2006 World Junior Championships in Athletics, but didn't make the finals. During the 2007 Indoor season, he set the French Junior record and ran with the senior 4x400 metres team at the 2007 European Athletics Indoor Championships. He was selected for the 2009 World Championships in Athletics – Men's 400 metres, but was unable to run after the bag containing his spikes were stolen. Finding a replacement a few days later, he ran on the French relay team where he came out of his exchange in dead last place, his final kick passed three other teams and brought France into close contention, though they finished in seventh place. Fonsat won the 400m bronze medal at the 2012 European Championships. He also competed at the 2010 and 2014 editions, but was unable to reach the finals.
