= 2009 European Athletics U23 Championships =

7th European Athletics U23 Championships
- Dates: 16–19 July 2009
- Host city: Kaunas, Lithuania
- Venue: S. Dariaus ir S. Girėno stadionas (Darius and Girėnas Stadium)
- Level: U23
- Type: Outdoor
- Events: 44
- Participation: 901 athletes from 42 nations

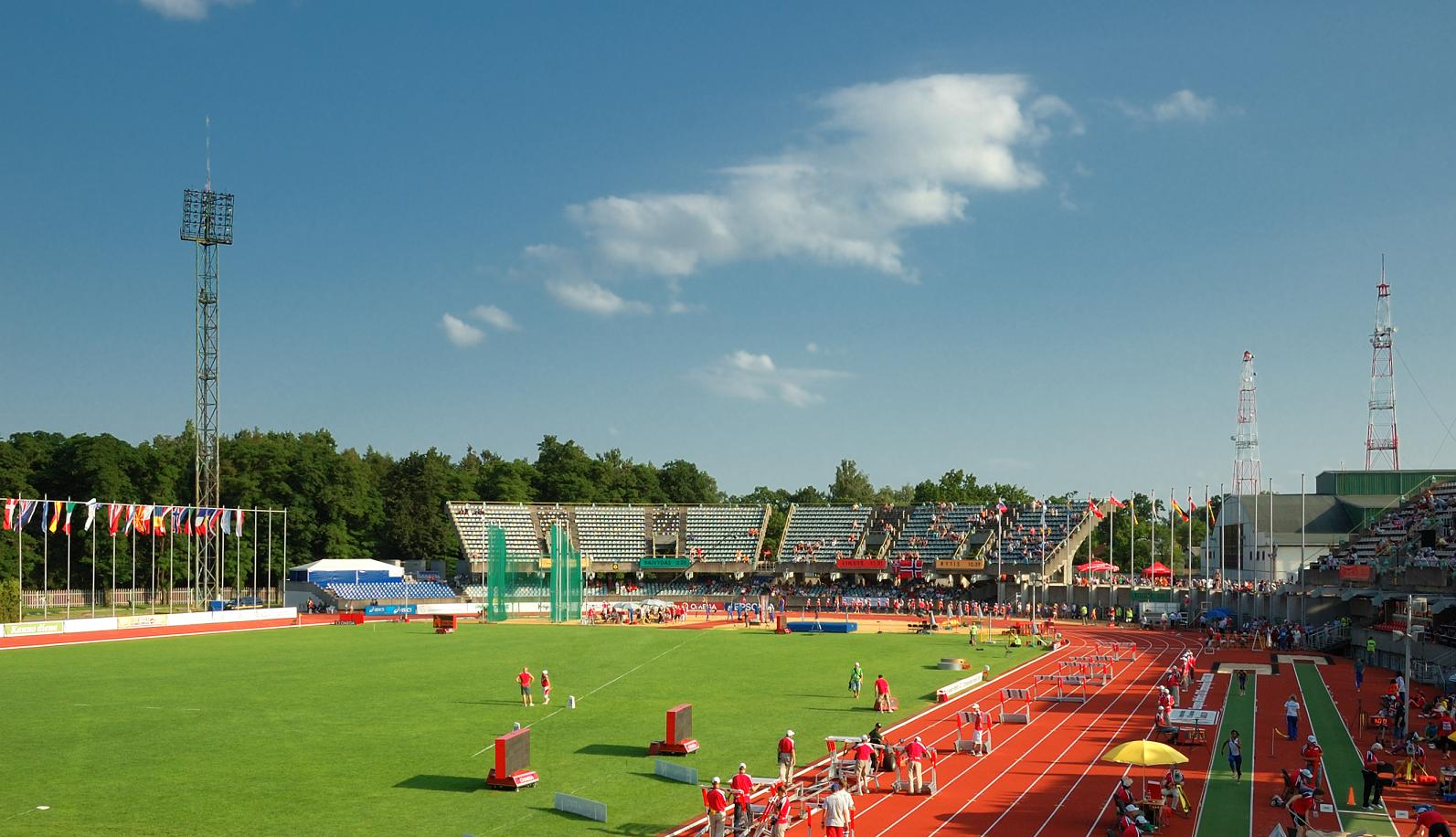
2009 European Athletics U23 Championships

The 7th European Athletics U23 Championships were held between 16 and 19 July 2009 in the S. Darius and S. Girėnas Stadium in Kaunas, Lithuania.

Complete results and medal winners were published.

== Men's results ==
Event	Gold		Silver		Bronze	
100 metres	Harry Aikines-Aryeetey (GBR)	10.15 SB	Leevan Yearwood (GBR)	10.26 SB	Rion Pierre (GBR)	10.28 SB
200 metres	Toby Sandeman (GBR)	20.37 PB	Aleixo-Platini Menga (GER)	20.59	Ihor Bodrov (UKR)	20.61 PB
400 metres	Yannick Fonsat (FRA)	45.68 PB	Nigel Levine (GBR)	45.78 PB	Jan Ciepiela (POL)	45.81 PB
800 metres	Adam Kszczot (POL)	1:45.81	Marcin Lewandowski (POL)	1:46.52	Robin Schembera (GER)	1:46.63
1500 metres	Ivan Tukhtachev (RUS)	3:51.19	James Brewer (GBR)	3:51.33	Jakub Holuša (CZE)	3:51.46
5000 metres	Mohamed Elbendir (ESP)	13:55.10	Noureddine Smaïl (FRA)	13:59.23 SB	David McCarthy (IRL)	14:00.78
10,000 metres	Selim Bayrak (TUR)	29:47.15	Andrea Lalli (ITA)	29:49.80	Dmytro Lashyn (UKR)	30:08.44
3000 metres steeplechase	Aleksandr Pavelyev (RUS)	8:40.55	José Luis Galván (ESP)	8:41.53 PB	Krystian Zalewski (POL)	8:42.06 PB
110 metres hurdles	Artur Noga (POL)	13.47	Gianni Frankis (GBR)	13.57 PB	Callum Priestley (GBR)	13.63 PB
400 metres hurdles	Lloyd Gumbs (GBR)	49.62 PB	Stanislav Melnykov (UKR)	49.88	Vincent Vanryckeghem (BEL)	49.90 PB
20 kilometres walk	Miguel Ángel López (ESP)	1:22:23 PB	Dzianis Simanovich (BLR)	1:22:57	Matteo Giupponi (ITA)	1:23:00 PB
4 × 100 metres relay	Ryan Scott; Toby Sandeman; Rion Pierre; Leevan Yearwood; Great Britain (GBR)	39.09	Emmanuel Biron; Mickael Arminana; Pierre-Alexis Pessonneaux; Teddy Tinmar; France (FRA)	39.26	Kamil Kryński; Artur Zaczek; Olaf Paruzel; Jakub Adamski; Poland (POL)	39.52
4 × 400 metres relay	Marcin Sobiech; Jakub Krzewina; Michał Pietrzak; Jan Ciepiela; Łukasz Krawczuk; Sebastian Porządny; Poland (POL)	3:03.74	Marco Vistalli; Isalbet Juarez; Domenico Fontana; Matteo Galvan; Italy (ITA)	3:03.79	Bruno Naprix; Mame-Ibra Anne; Yoann Décimus; Yannick Fonsat; Abdesslam Merabet; Adrien Clemenceau; France (FRA)	3:04.06
High jump	Sylwester Bednarek (POL)	2.28 PB	Oleksandr Nartov (UKR)	2.26	Andriy Protsenko (UKR)	2.24 =SB
Pole vault	Raphael Holzdeppe (GER)	5.65 SB	Luke Cutts (GBR)	5.60 PB	Dimitrios Patsoukakis (GRE)	5.55 PB
Long jump	Janis Leitis (LAT)	7.90 PB	Pavel Karavayev (RUS)	7.86	Mikko Kivinen (FIN)	7.85 =PB
Triple jump	Daniele Greco (ITA)	17.20 PB	Zhivko Petkov (BUL)	16.81	Aliaksandr Liabedzka (BLR)	16.80 PB
Shot put	Valeriy Kokoyev (RUS)	20.20 PB	Nick Petersen (DEN)	18.94 PB	Mateusz Mikos (POL)	18.89 PB
Discus throw	Nikolay Sedyuk (RUS)	60.80 SB	Ivan Hryshyn (UKR)	59.61	Martin Wierig (GER)	59.12
Hammer throw	Yury Shayunou (BLR)	78.16	Anatoliy Pozdnyakov (RUS)	72.42	Alexander Ziegler (GER)	72.32
Javelin throw	Ari Mannio (FIN)	84.57 CR	Petr Frydrych (CZE)	80.53	Spiridon Lebesis (GRE)	79.37 PB
Decathlon	Eelco Sintnicolaas (NED)	8112 PB	Mateo Sossah (FRA)	7885	Mihail Dudaš (SRB)	7855 PB
WR world record | AR area record | CR championship record | GR games record | NR national record | OR Olympic record | PB personal best | SB season best | WL world leading (in a given season)

== Women's results ==
Event	Gold		Silver		Bronze	
100 metres	Lina Grincikaitė (LTU)	11.37	Nataliya Pohrebnyak (UKR)	11.45	Marika Popowicz (POL)	11.50
200 metres	Aleksandra Fedoriva (RUS)	22.97 SB	Ewelina Ptak (POL)	23.07 PB	Marika Popowicz (POL)	23.25
400 metres	Kseniya Ustalova (RUS)	51.74	Kseniya Zadorina (RUS)	51.76	Anna Sedova (RUS)	52.58
800 metres	Elena Kofanova (RUS)	1:58.94	Nataliya Lupu (UKR)	2:01.08	Agnieszka Leszczyńska (POL)	2:01.53 PB
1500 metres	Sultan Haydar (TUR)	4:14.12	Kristina Khalayeva (RUS)	4:14.78	Yelena Fesenko (RUS)	4:15.86
5000 metres	Natalya Popkova (RUS)	15:54.11	Sviatlana Kudzelich (BLR)	16:03.85	Emily Pidgeon (GBR)	16:04.71 SB
10,000 metres	Natalya Popkova (RUS)	33:37.31	Zsofia Erdelyi (HUN)	33:39.89 PB	Azra Eminović (SRB)	33:47.19 PB
3000 metres steeplechase	Ancuţa Bobocel (ROU)	9:47.90	Julia Hiller (GER)	9:57.44	Susanne Lutz (GER)	10:01.87 PB
100 metres hurdles	Christina Vukicevic (NOR)	12.99	Yekaterina Shtepa (RUS)	13.28	Alina Talay (BLR)	13.30
400 metres hurdles	Perri Shakes-Drayton (GBR)	55.26 PB	Eilidh Child (GBR)	55.32 PB	Darya Korableva (RUS)	56.08
20 kilometres walk	Yelena Shumkina (RUS)	1:33:05	Zuzana Schindlerová (CZE)	1:33:42	Tatyana Shemyakina (RUS)	1:34:13
4 × 100 metres relay	Annabelle Lewis; Joey Duck; Lucy Sargent; Elaine O'Neill; Great Britain (GBR)	43.89	Agnieszka Ceglarek; Marika Popowicz; Milena Pędziwiatr; Weronika Wedler; Poland (POL)	43.90	Silvija Peseckaitė; Lina Andrijauskaitė; Sonata Tamošaitytė; Lina Grinčikaitė; Lithuania (LTU)	44.09
4 × 400 metres relay	Anna Sedova; Kseniya Zadorina; Kseniya Vdovina; Kseniya Ustalova; Lyudmila Mochalina; Russia (RUS)	3:27.59	Esther Cremer; Jill Richards; Janin Lindenberg; Sorina Nwachukwu; Lena Schmidt; Germany (GER)	3:29.21	Maryna Liboza; Katsiaryna Mishyna; Hanna Tashpulatava; Alena Kievich; Maryia Kavaliova; Belarus (BLR)	3:30.45
High jump	Aleksandra Shamsutdinova (RUS)	1.89	Melanie Bauschke (GER)	1.89	Urszula Domel (POL)	1.86 PB
Pole vault	Elisaveta Ryzih (GER)	4.50 =PB	Minna Nikkanen (FIN)	4.45 =PB	Vanessa Vandy (FIN)	4.35
Long jump	Melanie Bauschke (GER)	6.83 PB	Nastassia Mironchyk (BLR)	6.76	Éloyse Lesueur (FRA)	6.72 SB
Triple jump	Paraskevi Papachristou (GRE)	14.34 PB	Cristina Bujin (ROU)	14.26 PB	Liliya Kulyk (UKR)	13.88
Shot put	Denise Hinrichs (GER)	19.18	Irina Tarasova (RUS)	17.90	Alena Kopets (BLR)	17.72
Discus throw	Eden Francis (GBR)	57.29	Vera Karmishina (RUS)	54.48	Jade Nicholls (GBR)	54.44 PB
Hammer throw	Zalina Marghieva (MDA)	67.67	Katerina Safrankova (CZE)	63.01	Sarah Holt (GBR)	62.55
Javelin throw	Madara Palameika (LAT)	64.51 NR CR	Vira Rebryk (UKR)	61.43	Anna Wessman (SWE)	55.91 PB
Heptathlon	Aiga Grabuste (LAT)	6396 NR	Olga Kurban (RUS)	6205	Nadezhda Sergeeva (RUS)	6118 PB
WR world record | AR area record | CR championship record | GR games record | NR national record | OR Olympic record | PB personal best | SB season best | WL world leading (in a given season)

== Medal table ==
* Host nation (Lithuania)

Rank	Nation	Gold	Silver	Bronze	Total
1	Russia (RUS)	12	8	5	25
2	Great Britain (GBR)	7	6	5	18
3	Germany (GER)	4	4	4	12
4	Poland (POL)	4	3	8	15
5	Latvia (LAT)	3	0	0	3
6	Spain (ESP)	2	1	0	3
7	Turkey (TUR)	2	0	0	2
8	Belarus (BLR)	1	3	4	8
9	France (FRA)	1	3	2	6
10	Italy (ITA)	1	2	1	4
11	Finland (FIN)	1	1	2	4
12	Romania (ROU)	1	1	0	2
13	Greece (GRE)	1	0	2	3
14	Lithuania (LTU)*	1	0	1	2
15	Moldova (MDA)	1	0	0	1
15	Netherlands (NED)	1	0	0	1
15	Norway (NOR)	1	0	0	1
18	Ukraine (UKR)	0	6	4	10
19	Czech Republic (CZE)	0	3	1	4
20	Bulgaria (BUL)	0	1	0	1
20	Denmark (DEN)	0	1	0	1
20	Hungary (HUN)	0	1	0	1
23	Serbia (SRB)	0	0	2	2
24	Belgium (BEL)	0	0	1	1
24	Ireland (IRL)	0	0	1	1
24	Sweden (SWE)	0	0	1	1
Totals (26 entries)		44	44	44	132

== Participation ==
According to an unofficial count, 901 athletes from 42 countries participated in the event.

- Armenia (2)
- Austria (8)
- Azerbaijan (1)
- Belarus (31)
- Belgium (17)
- Bulgaria (9)
- Croatia (8)
- Cyprus (9)
- Czech Republic (22)
- Denmark (11)
- Estonia (15)
- Finland (36)
- France (72)
- Germany (59)
- Great Britain (48)
- Greece (22)
- Hungary (22)
- Ireland (14)
- Israel (6)
- Italy (56)
- Latvia (23)
- Lithuania (39)
- Luxembourg (1)
- Macedonia (1)
- Malta (1)
- Moldova (4)
- Monaco (1)
- Netherlands (28)
- Norway (15)
- Poland (67)
- Portugal (16)
- Romania (28)
- Russia (61)
- San Marino (1)
- Serbia (3)
- Slovakia (8)
- Slovenia (6)
- Spain (50)
- Sweden (23)
- Switzerland (13)
- Turkey (16)
- Ukraine (28)
