= 2015 World Youth Championships in Athletics – Girls' heptathlon =

Girls' heptathlon at the 2015 World Youth Championships in Athletics
- Venue: Estadio Olímpico Pascual Guerrero
- Dates: 17–18 July
- Competitors: 38 from 25 nations
- Winning points: 6037

Medalists
gold medal	Géraldine Ruckstuhl	Switzerland
silver medal	Sarah Lagger	Austria
bronze medal	Alina Shukh	Ukraine

The girls' heptathlon at the 2015 World Youth Championships in Athletics was held at the Estadio Olímpico Pascual Guerrero in Cali, Colombia from 17 to 18 July 2015.

== Records ==
Prior to the competition, the following records were as follows.

World Youth Best	Shen Shengfei (CHN)	6185	Shanghai, China	18 October 1997
Championship Record	Celina Leffler (GER)	5747	Donetsk, Ukraine	13 July 2013
World Youth Leading	Alina Shukh (UKR)	6039	Kropyvnytskyi, Ukraine	26 June 2015

== Results ==
=== 100 metres ===
Rank	Heat	Name	Nationality	Time	Points	Note
1	5	Adriana Rodríguez	Cuba	13.43	1060	PB
2	5	Marisa Vaz Carvalho	Portugal	13.45	1058	
3	5	Elizabeth Morland	Ireland	13.62	1033	PB
4	5	Lisa Maihöfer	Germany	13.69	1023	PB
5	5	Tereza Vokálová	Czech Republic	13.77	1011	PB
6	5	Solène Ndama	France	13.81	1005	
7	1	Maya Shreshta	Japan	13.90	993	PB
8	4	Michelle Hughes	Great Britain	13.91	991	PB
9	4	Géraldine Ruckstuhl	Switzerland	13.93	988	PB
10	3	Jordan Fields	United States	14.07	968	PB
11	3	Nina Schultz	Canada	14.13	960	PB
12	3	Elena Kelety	Germany	14.16	956	PB
13	3	Niamh Emerson	Great Britain	14.18	953	PB
14	4	Margit Kalk	Estonia	14.19	952	PB
15	5	Phoebe Edwards	New Zealand	14.20	950	
16	4	Emelie Nyman-Wänseth	Sweden	14.22	947	
17	4	Alina Shukh	Ukraine	14.26	942	
18	4	Paola Sarabia	Spain	14.33	932	
18	4	Andrea Obetzhofer	Austria	14.33	932	PB
20	5	Sarah Lagger	Austria	14.36	928	
21	2	Caice Lanovaz	United States	14.44	917	PB
22	3	Elisa Pineau	France	14.57	899	
23	3	Jacquelynne Rodríguez	Mexico	14.58	898	
24	2	Karolina Jóźwiak	Poland	14.59	897	PB
24	4	Carmen Ramos	Spain	14.59	897	
26	2	Pärl Eelma	Estonia	14.60	895	PB
27	1	Zhou Jingjing	China	14.70	882	PB
28	1	Dallyssa Huggins	Canada	14.71	880	PB
29	2	Patrycja Adamczyk	Poland	14.73	878	PB
30	2	Melina Kastrinou	Greece	14.74	876	PB
31	2	Niki Xidona	Greece	14.78	871	
32	2	Bianca Salming	Sweden	14.85	862	
33	1	Luca Renner	Hungary	14.89	856	PB
34	3	Lilian Borja	Mexico	14.94	850	
35	3	Sofia Montagna	Italy	14.96	847	
36	1	Amanda Frøynes	Norway	15.43	786	
37	1	Viktoriya Ryazantseva	Kazakhstan	15.87	730	
38	1	Emma Kovács	Hungary	15.99	715	

=== High jump ===
Rank	Group	Name	Nationality	1.37	1.40	1.43	1.46	1.49	1.52	1.55	1.58	Mark	Points	Notes
Rank	Group	Name	Nationality	1.61	1.64	1.67	1.70	1.73	1.76	1.79	1.82	Mark	Points	Notes
1	A	Lisa Maihöfer	Germany	–	–	–	–	–	–	–	–	1.79	966	
1	A	Lisa Maihöfer	Germany	–	–	o	o	o	o	o	xxx	1.79	966	
2	B	Nina Schultz	Canada	–	–	–	–	–	–	–	o	1.79	966	PB
2	B	Nina Schultz	Canada	o	o	o	o	o	o	xo	xxx	1.79	966	PB
3	A	Niamh Emerson	Great Britain	–	–	–	–	–	–	–	–	1.79	966	PB
3	A	Niamh Emerson	Great Britain	–	o	xo	o	xo	xo	xo	xxx	1.79	966	PB
4	A	Bianca Salming	Sweden	–	–	–	–	–	–	–	–	1.79	966	PB
4	A	Bianca Salming	Sweden	–	o	o	o	xo	o	xxo	xxx	1.79	966	PB
5	A	Elisa Pineau	France	–	–	–	–	–	–	–	–	1.76	928	PB
5	A	Elisa Pineau	France	o	o	o	o	o	o	xxx		1.76	928	PB
6	A	Emelie Nyman-Wänseth	Sweden	–	–	–	–	–	–	–	–	1.76	928	
6	A	Emelie Nyman-Wänseth	Sweden	–	o	o	o	xo	o	xxx		1.76	928	
6	A	Luca Renner	Hungary	–	–	–	–	–	–	–	–	1.76	928	
6	A	Luca Renner	Hungary	o	o	o	o	xo	o	xxx		1.76	928	
8	A	Sarah Lagger	Austria	–	–	–	–	–	–	–	–	1.76	928	PB
8	A	Sarah Lagger	Austria	o	xo	o	xo	xo	xxo	xxx		1.76	928	PB
9	A	Dallyssa Huggins	Canada	–	–	–	–	–	–	–	o	1.73	891	SB
9	A	Dallyssa Huggins	Canada	o	o	o	o	o	xxx			1.73	891	SB
10	A	Géraldine Ruckstuhl	Switzerland	–	–	–	–	–	–	–	–	1.73	891	
10	A	Géraldine Ruckstuhl	Switzerland	o	o	xo	o	o	xxx			1.73	891	
11	B	Adriana Rodríguez	Cuba	–	–	–	–	–	o	–	o	1.73	891	PB
11	B	Adriana Rodríguez	Cuba	o	xo	o	o	xo	xxx			1.73	891	PB
12	A	Phoebe Edwards	New Zealand	–	–	–	–	–	–	–	–	1.73	891	
12	A	Phoebe Edwards	New Zealand	o	–	o	xxo	xo	xxx			1.73	891	
13	A	Tereza Vokálová	Czech Republic	–	–	–	–	–	o	o	o	1.70	855	
13	A	Tereza Vokálová	Czech Republic	o	o	o	o	xxx				1.70	855	
14	B	Andrea Obetzhofer	Austria	–	–	–	–	o	o	o	o	1.70	855	PB
14	B	Andrea Obetzhofer	Austria	xo	o	xo	o	xxx				1.70	855	PB
15	B	Patrycja Adamczyk	Poland	–	–	–	–	–	–	o	o	1.70	855	PB
15	B	Patrycja Adamczyk	Poland	o	o	xo	xo	xxx				1.70	855	PB
15	A	Paola Sarabia	Spain	–	–	–	–	–	o	–	o	1.70	855	
15	A	Paola Sarabia	Spain	–	xo	o	xo	xxx				1.70	855	
17	A	Emma Kovács	Hungary	–	–	–	–	–	–	–	o	1.70	855	
17	A	Emma Kovács	Hungary	o	xxo	o	xo	xxx				1.70	855	
18	A	Alina Shukh	Ukraine	–	–	–	–	–	–	–	–	1.70	855	
18	A	Alina Shukh	Ukraine	–	–	o	xxo	xxx				1.70	855	
19	B	Elena Kelety	Germany	–	–	–	–	–	o	o	o	1.67	818	PB
19	B	Elena Kelety	Germany	xo	o	o	xxx					1.67	818	PB
20	B	Jacquelynne Rodríguez	Mexico	–	–	–	–	o	o	o	o	1.67	818	PB
20	B	Jacquelynne Rodríguez	Mexico	o	xxo	o	xxx					1.67	818	PB
21	B	Maya Shreshta	Japan	–	–	o	o	o	xo	o	xxo	1.67	818	PB
21	B	Maya Shreshta	Japan	xo	o	o	xxx					1.67	818	PB
22	A	Elizabeth Morland	Ireland	–	–	–	–	–	–	o	o	1.67	818	
22	A	Elizabeth Morland	Ireland	o	o	xo	xxx					1.67	818	
23	B	Niki Xidona	Greece	–	–	–	–	o	–	o	o	1.64	783	
23	B	Niki Xidona	Greece	o	o	xxx						1.64	783	
24	A	Michelle Hughes	Great Britain	–	–	–	–	–	o	–	o	1.64	783	
24	A	Michelle Hughes	Great Britain	xo	o	xxx						1.64	783	
25	B	Amanda Frøynes	Norway	–	–	–	–	–	–	xo	o	1.64	783	
25	B	Amanda Frøynes	Norway	xo	o	xxx						1.64	783	
26	B	Carmen Ramos	Spain	–	–	o	–	o	xo	o	xxo	1.64	783	PB
26	B	Carmen Ramos	Spain	xo	xxo	xxx						1.64	783	PB
27	B	Pärl Eelma	Estonia	–	–	–	–	–	–	o	o	1.61	747	
27	B	Pärl Eelma	Estonia	o	xxx							1.61	747	
28	B	Sofia Montagna	Italy	–	–	o	o	o	xo	o	o	1.61	747	PB
28	B	Sofia Montagna	Italy	o	xxx							1.61	747	PB
29	B	Marisa Vaz Carvalho	Portugal	–	–	–	–	xo	o	–	o	1.61	747	
29	B	Marisa Vaz Carvalho	Portugal	xo	xr							1.61	747	
30	B	Margit Kalk	Estonia	–	–	–	o	xo	o	o	xo	1.61	747	PB
30	B	Margit Kalk	Estonia	xo	xxx							1.61	747	PB
31	B	Caice Lanovaz	United States	–	–	–	–	o	o	o	o	1.61	747	
31	B	Caice Lanovaz	United States	xxo	xxx							1.61	747	
31	A	Jordan Fields	United States	–	–	–	–	–	–	o	–	1.61	747	
31	A	Jordan Fields	United States	xxo	xxx							1.61	747	
33	B	Lilian Borja	Mexico	–	–	–	–	o	o	xo	o	1.61	747	
33	B	Lilian Borja	Mexico	xxo	xxx							1.61	747	
33	A	Solène Ndama	France	–	–	–	–	–	–	o	xo	1.61	747	
33	A	Solène Ndama	France	xxo	xxx							1.61	747	
35	B	Karolina Jóźwiak	Poland	–	–	–	–	–	o	xo	xo	1.58	712	
35	B	Karolina Jóźwiak	Poland	xxx								1.58	712	
36	B	Zhou Jingjing	China	–	–	–	o	o	o	o	xxo	1.58	712	
36	B	Zhou Jingjing	China	xxx								1.58	712	
37	A	Viktoriya Ryazantseva	Kazakhstan	–	–	–	–	–	xo	xxo	xxx	1.55	678	
38	B	Melina Kastrinou	Greece	–	–	–	–	o	–	xxx		1.49	610	

=== Shot put ===
Rank	Group	Name	Nationality	1	2	3	Mark	Points	Notes
1	A	Andrea Obetzhofer	Austria	14.25	14.83	15.07	15.07	866	
2	A	Bianca Salming	Sweden	12.88	13.69	14.75	14.75	844	
3	A	Alina Shukh	Ukraine	14.03	14.55	x	14.55	831	
4	A	Marisa Vaz Carvalho	Portugal	14.33	13.12	14.46	14.46	825	PB
5	A	Géraldine Ruckstuhl	Switzerland	x	14.21	14.25	14.25	811	SB
6	A	Adriana Rodríguez	Cuba	13.09	13.92	14.19	14.19	807	
7	A	Carmen Ramos	Spain	13.54	14.10	x	14.10	801	PB
8	A	Zhou Jingjing	China	12.58	13.59	13.78	13.78	779	PB
9	A	Elisa Pineau	France	13.64	13.40	x	13.64	770	
10	A	Sarah Lagger	Austria	12.85	13.21	13.35	13.35	751	
11	A	Karolina Jóźwiak	Poland	13.17	x	x	13.17	739	PB
12	A	Lisa Maihöfer	Germany	12.41	12.29	12.96	12.96	725	PB
13	A	Melina Kastrinou	Greece	11.50	12.62	x	12.62	702	
14	A	Solène Ndama	France	12.52	x	12.58	12.58	700	PB
15	A	Emelie Nyman-Wänseth	Sweden	11.43	11.59	12.56	12.56	698	
16	A	Emma Kovács	Hungary	11.94	x	12.39	12.39	687	
17	B	Luca Renner	Hungary	11.12	12.16	11.56	12.16	672	PB
18	B	Margit Kalk	Estonia	11.70	12.11	x	12.11	668	PB
19	B	Patrycja Adamczyk	Poland	11.75	11.31	12.04	12.04	664	PB
20	B	Niki Xidona	Greece	11.50	11.78	11.89	11.89	654	PB
21	A	Elizabeth Morland	Ireland	11.69	11.84	x	11.84	651	
22	B	Michelle Hughes	Great Britain	x	11.22	11.80	11.80	648	
23	A	Lilian Borja	Mexico	11.44	11.64	11.64	11.64	637	
24	B	Maya Shreshta	Japan	9.75	11.32	11.58	11.58	633	PB
25	A	Nina Schultz	Canada	11.57	11.35	11.39	11.57	633	
26	B	Paola Sarabia	Spain	11.55	x	10.72	11.55	631	
27	B	Phoebe Edwards	New Zealand	11.52	11.54	11.27	11.54	631	PB
28	B	Elena Kelety	Germany	11.46	10.50	x	11.46	625	
29	B	Caice Lanovaz	United States	10.72	11.00	11.22	11.22	610	PB
30	B	Dallyssa Huggins	Canada	10.15	10.60	10.66	10.66	573	
31	B	Sofia Montagna	Italy	8.97	10.29	10.43	10.43	558	
32	B	Jordan Fields	United States	9.98	10.16	10.24	10.24	545	
33	B	Niamh Emerson	Great Britain	x	10.16	9.49	10.16	540	
34	B	Pärl Eelma	Estonia	x	9.93	10.14	10.14	539	
35	B	Viktoriya Ryazantseva	Kazakhstan	9.83	10.11	8.43	10.11	537	
36	B	Jacquelynne Rodríguez	Mexico	9.96	9.14	9.47	9.96	527	
37	B	Tereza Vokálová	Czech Republic	9.09	9.53	9.54	9.54	499	
38	B	Amanda Frøynes	Norway	9.21	8.99	9.00	9.21	478	

=== 200 metres ===
Rank	Heat	Name	Nationality	Time	Points	Note
1	5	Marisa Vaz Carvalho	Portugal	24.32	950	
2	5	Sarah Lagger	Austria	24.53	930	PB
3	5	Adriana Rodríguez	Cuba	24.64	920	
4	5	Andrea Obetzhofer	Austria	24.75	910	PB
5	5	Elizabeth Morland	Ireland	24.84	902	PB
6	5	Tereza Vokálová	Czech Republic	25.01	886	SB
7	5	Elena Kelety	Germany	25.09	879	
8	3	Lisa Maihöfer	Germany	25.12	876	PB
9	4	Michelle Hughes	Great Britain	25.18	870	PB
10	5	Jacquelynne Rodríguez	Mexico	25.19	869	
11	4	Caice Lanovaz	United States	25.29	860	PB
12	3	Emelie Nyman-Wänseth	Sweden	25.36	854	PB
13	3	Carmen Ramos	Spain	25.51	841	PB
13	4	Sofia Montagna	Italy	25.51	841	
15	4	Phoebe Edwards	New Zealand	25.59	833	
16	2	Niki Xidona	Greece	25.61	832	PB
17	4	Margit Kalk	Estonia	25.62	831	
18	3	Paola Sarabia	Spain	25.64	829	PB
18	3	Nina Schultz	Canada	25.64	829	PB
20	4	Niamh Emerson	Great Britain	25.70	824	
21	3	Amanda Frøynes	Norway	25.81	814	PB
22	4	Géraldine Ruckstuhl	Switzerland	25.83	812	
23	2	Jordan Fields	United States	25.93	803	PB
24	1	Dallyssa Huggins	Canada	25.97	800	PB
25	2	Luca Renner	Hungary	26.06	792	PB
26	1	Maya Shreshta	Japan	26.08	790	PB
26	2	Pärl Eelma	Estonia	26.08	790	PB
28	4	Viktoriya Ryazantseva	Kazakhstan	26.13	786	
29	3	Patrycja Adamczyk	Poland	26.15	784	
30	2	Karolina Jóźwiak	Poland	26.38	764	
31	1	Solène Ndama	France	26.58	747	PB
32	1	Melina Kastrinou	Greece	26.77	731	SB
33	1	Bianca Salming	Sweden	26.78	730	
34	1	Zhou Jingjing	China	26.95	716	
35	2	Alina Shukh	Ukraine	26.96	715	
36	3	Elisa Pineau	France	27.37	681	
37	1	Emma Kovács	Hungary	27.71	654	
–	2	Lilian Borja	Mexico	DNS	0	

=== Shot put ===
Rank	Group	Name	Nationality	1	2	3	Mark	Points	Notes
1	B	Sarah Lagger	Austria	5.88	6.21	6.04	6.21	915	PB
2	B	Lisa Maihöfer	Germany	x	6.10	6.01	6.10	880	
3	B	Tereza Vokálová	Czech Republic	5.83	5.83	5.80	5.83	798	
4	A	Emelie Nyman-Wänseth	Sweden	x	x	5.82	5.82	795	PB
5	B	Andrea Obetzhofer	Austria	5.68	5.79	5.75	5.79	786	PB
6	B	Phoebe Edwards	New Zealand	5.48	5.73	5.79	5.79	786	PB
7	A	Bianca Salming	Sweden	x	5.55	5.72	5.72	765	PB
8	B	Géraldine Ruckstuhl	Switzerland	5.71	x	5.65	5.71	762	PB
9	B	Niamh Emerson	Great Britain	4.38	5.40	5.69	5.69	756	PB
10	B	Marisa Vaz Carvalho	Portugal	5.69	x	x	5.69	756	
11	B	Niki Xidona	Greece	5.39	5.67	5.50	5.67	750	SB
12	B	Luca Renner	Hungary	5.63	x	5.66	5.66	747	
13	B	Adriana Rodríguez	Cuba	x	x	5.66	5.66	747	
14	A	Alina Shukh	Ukraine	5.64	5.64	5.63	5.64	741	PB
15	A	Jordan Fields	United States	5.33	5.60	5.58	5.60	729	PB
16	B	Michelle Hughes	Great Britain	5.60	5.50	5.42	5.60	729	
17	B	Elizabeth Morland	Ireland	5.44	5.48	5.54	5.54	712	
18	B	Viktoriya Ryazantseva	Kazakhstan	5.54	x	x	5.54	712	
19	A	Caice Lanovaz	United States	5.51	5.37	5.36	5.51	703	
20	A	Karolina Jóźwiak	Poland	5.14	5.44	5.49	5.49	697	PB
21	B	Sofia Montagna	Italy	5.42	5.17	5.43	5.43	680	
22	A	Nina Schultz	Canada	x	5.25	5.38	5.38	665	
23	A	Patrycja Adamczyk	Poland	5.22	5.15	5.34	5.34	654	
24	A	Solène Ndama	France	5.34	5.11	5.21	5.34	654	
25	B	Pärl Eelma	Estonia	5.26	5.33	5.32	5.33	651	
26	A	Carmen Ramos	Spain	5.31	5.30	x	5.31	645	
27	A	Elisa Pineau	France	x	5.14	5.31	5.31	645	
28	A	Melina Kastrinou	Greece	5.03	5.22	5.26	5.26	631	
29	A	Paola Sarabia	Spain	x	5.13	5.22	5.22	620	
30	A	Maya Shreshta	Japan	5.21	x	x	5.21	617	PB
31	A	Zhou Jingjing	China	5.05	5.20	4.95	5.20	614	PB
32	A	Jacquelynne Rodríguez	Mexico	4.87	5.15	5.19	5.19	612	
33	A	Emma Kovács	Hungary	5.17	5.06	5.08	5.17	606	
34	B	Margit Kalk	Estonia	5.03	3.85	x	5.03	567	
35	A	Dallyssa Huggins	Canada	x	4.65	4.93	4.93	540	PB
36	B	Elena Kelety	Germany	x	x	4.31	4.31	381	
–	A	Amanda Frøynes	Norway				DNS	0	

=== Javelin throw ===
Rank	Group	Name	Nationality	1	2	3	Mark	Points	Notes
1	B	Alina Shukh	Ukraine	45.95	53.71	54.57	54.57	949	PB
2	B	Géraldine Ruckstuhl	Switzerland	50.32	52.03	52.87	52.87	916	
3	B	Andrea Obetzhofer	Austria	46.46	x	38.27	46.46	792	PB
4	B	Bianca Salming	Sweden	43.59	x	43.97	43.97	744	
5	B	Margit Kalk	Estonia	41.00	43.96	x	43.96	743	
6	B	Elizabeth Morland	Ireland	38.83	43.64	x	43.64	737	PB
7	B	Patrycja Adamczyk	Poland	42.83	37.52	36.42	42.83	722	PB
8	B	Carmen Ramos	Spain	31.71	36.44	40.43	40.43	676	PB
9	A	Maya Shreshta	Japan	34.85	39.82	31.81	39.82	664	PB
10	B	Sarah Lagger	Austria	39.30	x	39.14	39.30	654	
11	B	Emma Kovács	Hungary	36.97	39.16	38.76	39.16	651	
12	B	Nina Schultz	Canada	35.24	32.03	39.05	39.05	649	PB
13	B	Emelie Nyman-Wänseth	Sweden	x	x	39.04	39.04	649	PB
14	B	Paola Sarabia	Spain	38.31	38.03	x	38.31	635	PB
15	A	Elisa Pineau	France	37.03	38.07	x	38.07	630	PB
16	B	Niki Xidona	Greece	x	35.25	37.41	37.41	618	
17	A	Tereza Vokálová	Czech Republic	31.05	28.71	36.64	36.64	603	PB
18	B	Jacquelynne Rodríguez	Mexico	30.77	31.75	36.42	36.42	599	
19	A	Caice Lanovaz	United States	34.41	31.46	35.32	35.32	578	PB
20	A	Adriana Rodríguez	Cuba	29.84	34.54	32.89	34.54	563	
21	A	Marisa Vaz Carvalho	Portugal	x	34.40	x	34.40	560	
22	B	Elena Kelety	Germany	x	x	34.26	34.26	558	
23	A	Lisa Maihöfer	Germany	x	34.09	x	34.09	554	PB
24	A	Zhou Jingjing	China	31.87	33.25	32.73	33.25	538	
25	A	Luca Renner	Hungary	32.18	31.49	32.86	32.86	531	
26	A	Viktoriya Ryazantseva	Kazakhstan	28.53	x	31.35	31.35	502	
27	B	Karolina Jóźwiak	Poland	x	29.62	x	29.62	469	
28	A	Michelle Hughes	Great Britain	29.57	x	x	29.57	468	
29	A	Pärl Eelma	Estonia	x	x	29.33	29.33	464	
30	A	Sofia Montagna	Italy	x	x	28.99	28.99	457	
31	A	Niamh Emerson	Great Britain	x	28.91	28.36	28.91	456	
32	A	Dallyssa Huggins	Canada	x	27.34	23.20	27.34	426	
33	A	Melina Kastrinou	Greece	26.88	x	x	26.88	418	
34	A	Solène Ndama	France	26.36	x	26.16	26.36	408	
35	A	Phoebe Edwards	New Zealand	25.41	23.60	25.35	25.41	390	
36	A	Jordan Fields	United States	25.27	23.53	x	25.27	387	
–	B	Amanda Frøynes	Norway				DNS	0	

=== 800 metres ===
Rank	Heat	Name	Nationality	Time	Points	Note
1	2	Niamh Emerson	Great Britain	2:15.27	889	PB
2	4	Sarah Lagger	Austria	2:15.48	886	PB
3	1	Dallyssa Huggins	Canada	2:17.01	865	
4	4	Alina Shukh	Ukraine	2:17.09	863	
5	4	Géraldine Ruckstuhl	Switzerland	2:17.58	857	PB
6	1	Elena Kelety	Germany	2:20.49	817	PB
7	3	Maya Shreshta	Japan	2:20.87	812	PB
8	1	Jordan Fields	United States	2:21.55	803	PB
9	1	Zhou Jingjing	China	2:23.09	782	
10	4	Lisa Maihöfer	Germany	2:23.27	780	PB
11	3	Margit Kalk	Estonia	2:23.34	779	PB
12	4	Bianca Salming	Sweden	2:23.68	774	PB
13	4	Marisa Vaz Carvalho	Portugal	2:24.03	770	PB
14	1	Pärl Eelma	Estonia	2:24.05	769	PB
15	2	Caice Lanovaz	United States	2:24.27	766	
16	3	Patrycja Adamczyk	Poland	2:24.78	760	
17	3	Carmen Ramos	Spain	2:25.04	756	
18	1	Emma Kovács	Hungary	2:25.27	753	PB
19	2	Paola Sarabia	Spain	2:25.29	753	
20	4	Emelie Nyman-Wänseth	Sweden	2:25.35	752	PB
21	3	Elisa Pineau	France	2:25.65	748	
22	4	Adriana Rodríguez	Cuba	2:26.91	732	
23	3	Luca Renner	Hungary	2:27.08	730	PB
24	3	Tereza Vokálová	Czech Republic	2:27.09	730	
25	2	Michelle Hughes	Great Britain	2:27.91	719	
26	3	Elizabeth Morland	Ireland	2:28.19	716	
27	3	Nina Schultz	Canada	2:29.14	704	
28	1	Viktoriya Ryazantseva	Kazakhstan	2:30.80	683	
29	2	Jacquelynne Rodríguez	Mexico	2:30.88	682	
30	2	Solène Ndama	France	2:32.17	666	
31	4	Andrea Obetzhofer	Austria	2:33.05	655	
32	2	Phoebe Edwards	New Zealand	2:33.17	654	PB
33	2	Karolina Jóźwiak	Poland	2:34.44	638	
34	1	Sofia Montagna	Italy	2:35.32	628	
–	2	Niki Xidona	Greece	DNF	0	
–	1	Melina Kastrinou	Greece	DQ	0	

=== Final standing ===
Rank	Name	Nationality	100mh	HJ	SP	200m	LJ	JT	800m	Total	Note
1st place, gold medalist(s)	Géraldine Ruckstuhl	Switzerland	988	891	811	812	762	916	857	6037	CR
2nd place, silver medalist(s)	Sarah Lagger	Austria	928	928	751	930	915	654	886	5992	
3rd place, bronze medalist(s)	Alina Shukh	Ukraine	942	855	831	715	741	949	863	5896	
4	Lisa Maihöfer	Germany	1023	966	725	876	880	554	780	5804	PB
5	Andrea Obetzhofer	Austria	932	855	866	910	786	792	655	5796	PB
6	Adriana Rodríguez	Cuba	1060	891	807	920	747	563	732	5720	PB
7	Bianca Salming	Sweden	863	966	844	730	765	744	774	5685	PB
8	Marisa Vaz Carvalho	Portugal	1058	747	825	950	756	560	770	5666	PB
9	Emelie Nyman-Wänseth	Sweden	947	928	698	854	795	649	752	5623	PB
10	Elizabeth Morland	Ireland	1033	818	651	902	712	737	716	5569	
11	Nina Schultz	Canada	960	966	633	829	665	649	704	5406	PB
12	Carmen Ramos	Spain	897	783	802	841	645	676	756	5399	PB
13	Niamh Emerson	Great Britain	953	966	540	824	756	456	889	5384	PB
14	Tereza Vokálová	Czech Republic	1011	855	499	886	798	603	730	5382	PB
15	Maya Shreshta	Japan	993	818	633	790	617	664	812	5327	PB
16	Patrycja Adamczyk	Poland	878	855	664	784	654	722	760	5317	PB
17	Elisa Pineau	France	899	928	770	681	645	630	748	5301	
18	Margit Kalk	Estonia	952	747	668	831	567	743	779	5287	
19	Luca Renner	Hungary	856	928	672	792	747	531	730	5256	
20	Paola Sarabia	Spain	932	855	631	829	620	635	753	5255	PB
21	Michelle Hughes	Great Britain	991	783	648	870	729	468	719	5208	
22	Caice Lanovaz	United States	917	747	610	860	703	578	766	5181	PB
23	Phoebe Edwards	New Zealand	950	891	631	833	786	390	654	5135	
24	Elena Kelety	Germany	956	818	625	879	381	558	817	5034	
25	Zhou Jingjing	China	882	712	779	716	614	538	782	02	PB
26	Jacquelynne Rodríguez	Mexico	898	818	527	869	612	599	682	5005	PB
27	Jordan Fields	United States	968	747	545	803	729	387	803	4982	
28	Dallyssa Huggins	Canada	880	891	573	800	540	426	865	4975	
29	Solène Ndama	France	1005	747	700	747	654	408	666	4927	
30	Emma Kovács	Hungary	715	855	687	654	606	651	753	4921	
31	Karolina Jóźwiak	Poland	897	712	739	764	697	469	638	4916	
32	Pärl Eelma	Estonia	895	747	539	790	651	464	769	4855	
33	Sofia Montagna	Italy	847	747	558	841	680	457	628	4758	
34	Viktoriya Ryazantseva	Kazakhstan	730	678	537	786	712	502	683	4628	
35	Niki Xidona	Greece	871	783	654	832	750	618	0	4508	
36	Melina Kastrinou	Greece	876	610	702	731	631	418	0	3968	
–	Amanda Frøynes	Norway	786	783	478	814				DNF	
–	Lilian Borja	Mexico	850	747	637					DNF	
