= 2011 European Athletics Indoor Championships =

- Edition: 31st
- Dates: 4–6 March
- Host city: Paris, France
- Venue: Palais Omnisports de Paris-Bercy
- Events: 26
- Participation: 577 athletes from 46 nations

The 2011 European Athletics Indoor Championships were held at the Palais Omnisports de Paris-Bercy in Paris, France, from 4 to 6 March 2011.

577 athletes representing 46 countries competed at the championships. Twenty-six track and field events were contested, with the events programme divided equally between the genders. Russia topped the medal table, having won the most gold medals (six), as well as having gained the greatest total with fifteen. The host nation, France, was the next best performing team, with five golds being won by French athletes. Germany had the third highest medal haul, followed by Great Britain.

French triple jumper Teddy Tamgho provided the highlight of the tournament with two world indoor record clearances. His compatriot Renaud Lavillenie also excelled, becoming the third best ever performer indoors in the men's pole vault, while Leslie Djhone and Antoinette Nana Djimou Ida won their events with French record marks.

Belarusian Andrei Krauchanka's national record performance won the men's heptathlon and Poland's Anna Rogowska took the women's pole vault with a national record. Portuguese runner Francis Obikwelu also had a national record-breaking win, defeating the host favourite Christophe Lemaitre in the 60 metres. The women's 3000 metres saw Briton Helen Clitheroe win her first major title at the age of 37. Ivan Ukhov of Russia attempted the world record in the high jump, but narrowly missed the clearance. The competition closed with the fifth French record of the championships as the host men's team won the 4 × 400 metres relay.

== Venue ==
The venue for the 2011 European Athletics Indoor Championships was the Palais Omnisports de Paris-Bercy. It can hold a maximum capacity of 18,000 people and has hold several indoor athletics events in the past, including the 1985 IAAF World Indoor Games, the 1994 European Indoor Championships and the 1997 IAAF World Indoor Championships.

== Ceremonies ==
The opening ceremony was held at 4 March 2011 at 15:00 local time. There was a short ceremony but without teams participation. The closing ceremony took place at 18:00 on the last day, 6 March 2011, and every participating team was invited.

== Schedule ==
Legend
Key	P	Q	H	½	F
Value	Preliminary round	Qualifiers	Heats	Semifinals	Final

Men
March	4		5		6
60 m			H	½	F
400 m	H	½		F	
800 m		H		½	F
1500 m				H	F
3000 m	H			F	
60 m hurdles	H	F			
4 × 400 m relay					F
High jump		Q		F	
Pole vault		Q		F	
Long jump	Q			F	
Triple jump		Q			F
Shot put	Q	F			
Heptathlon			F		

Women
March	4		5		6
60 m			H	½	F
400 m	H	½		F	
800 m		H		½	F
1500 m		H		F	
3000 m			H	F	
60 m hurdles	H	F			
4 × 400 m relay					F
High jump			Q		F
Pole vault			Q		F
Long jump			Q		F
Triple jump	Q			F	
Shot put		Q		F	
Pentathlon	F				

== Men's results ==
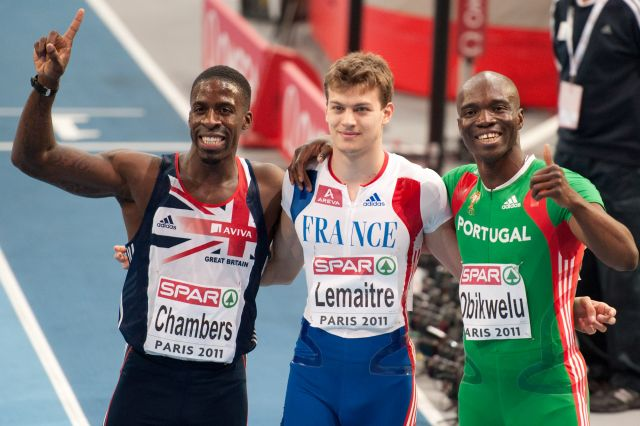
The men's 60 m medallists (l–r): Chambers, Lemaitre, Obikwelu

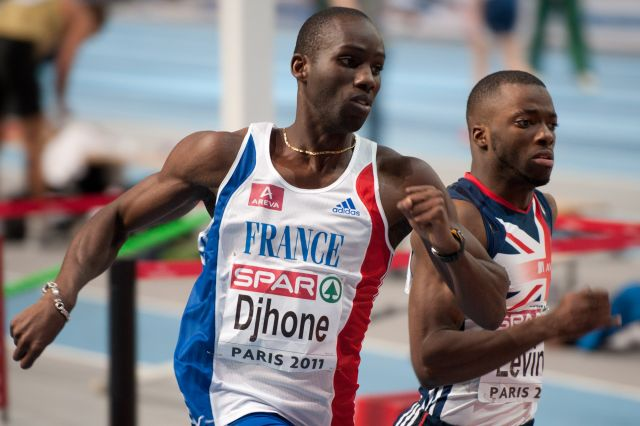
Leslie Djhone en route to his 400 m title

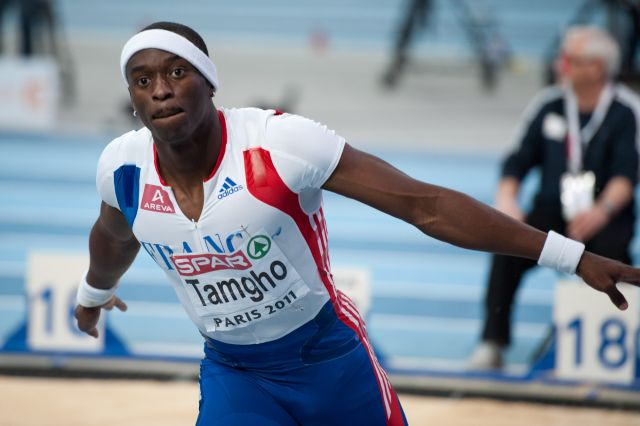
Teddy Tamgho celebrates his world record

=== Track ===
Event	Gold		Silver		Bronze	
60 metres	Francis Obikwelu; Portugal	6.53; NR EL	Dwain Chambers; Great Britain	6.54; SB	Christophe Lemaitre; France	6.58
400 metres	Leslie Djhone; France	45.54; NR EL	Thomas Schneider; Germany	46.42	Richard Buck; Great Britain	46.62
800 metres	Adam Kszczot; Poland	1:47.87	Marcin Lewandowski; Poland	1:48.23	Kevin López; Spain	1:48.35
1500 metres	Manuel Olmedo; Spain	3:41.03; SB	Kemal Koyuncu; Turkey	3:41.18; NR	Bartosz Nowicki; Poland	3:41.48
3000 metres	Mo Farah; Great Britain	7:53.00	Hayle Ibrahimov; Azerbaijan	7:53.32	Halil Akkas; Turkey	7:54.19
60 m hurdles	Petr Svoboda; Czech Republic	7.49	Garfield Darien; France	7.56 =PB	Adrien Deghelt; Belgium	7.57; PB
4 × 400 m relay	France; Marc Macedot; Leslie Djhone; Mamoudou Hanne; Yoan Décimus	3:06.17; NR	Great Britain; Nigel Levine; Nick Leavey; Richard Strachan; Richard Buck	3:06.46	Belgium; Jonathan Borlée; Antoine Gillet; Nils Duerinck; Kevin Borlée	3:06.57
WR world record | ER European record | CR championship record | NR national record | WL world leading | EL European leading | PB personal best | SB seasonal best

=== Field ===
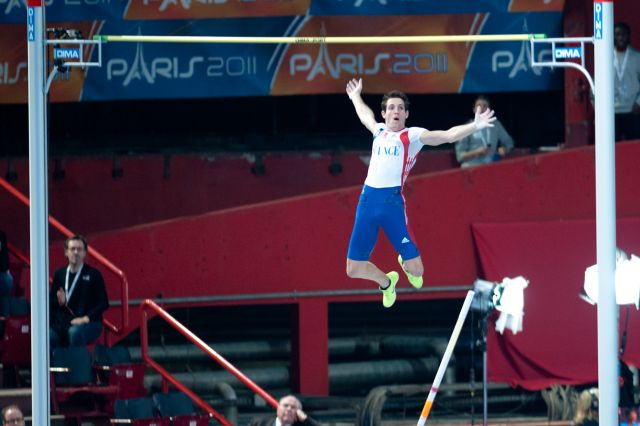
Renaud Lavillenie clears the bar at the Palais Omnisports

Event	Gold		Silver		Bronze	
High jump	Ivan Ukhov; Russia	2.38 =WL	Jaroslav Bába; Czech Republic	2.34; SB	Aleksandr Shustov; Russia	2.34; PB
Pole vault	Renaud Lavillenie; France	6.03; WL NR CR	Jérôme Clavier; France	5.76	Malte Mohr; Germany	5.71
Long jump	Sebastian Bayer; Germany	8.16; SB	Kafétien Gomis; France	8.03; SB	Morten Jensen; Denmark	8.00; SB
Triple jump	Teddy Tamgho; France	17.92; WR	Fabrizio Donato; Italy	17.73; NR	Marian Oprea; Romania	17.62; SB
Shot put	Ralf Bartels; Germany	21.16; EL	David Storl; Germany	20.75; SB	Maksim Sidorov; Russia	20.55
WR world record | ER European record | CR championship record | NR national record | WL world leading | EL European leading | PB personal best | SB seasonal best

=== Combined ===
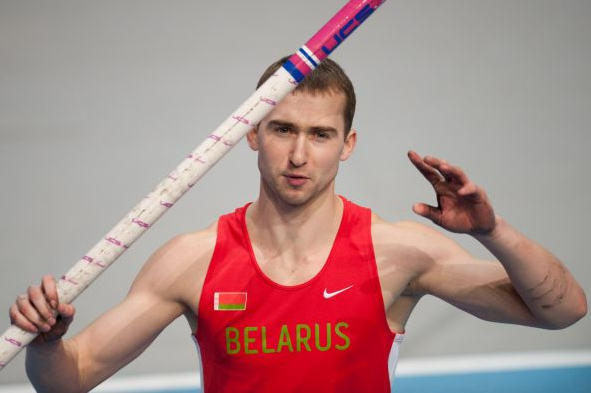
Heptathlon winner Andrei Krauchanka with a pole vault

Event	Gold		Silver		Bronze	
Heptathlon	Andrei Krauchanka; Belarus	6282; EL NR	Nadir El Fassi; France	6237; PB	Roman Šebrle; Czech Republic	6178; SB
WR world record | ER European record | CR championship record | NR national record | WL world leading | EL European leading | PB personal best | SB seasonal best

== Women's results ==
=== Track ===
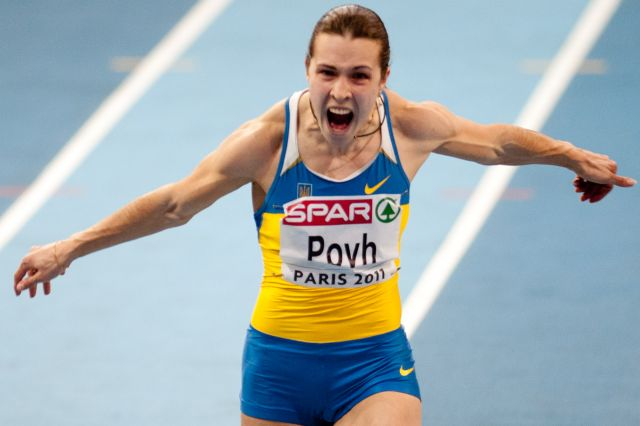
Pre-race favourite Olesya Povh of Ukraine won the 60 m sprint.

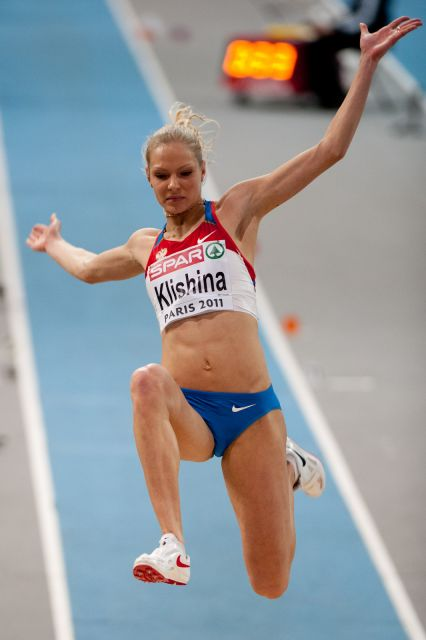
Russia's Darya Klishina took the long jump gold.

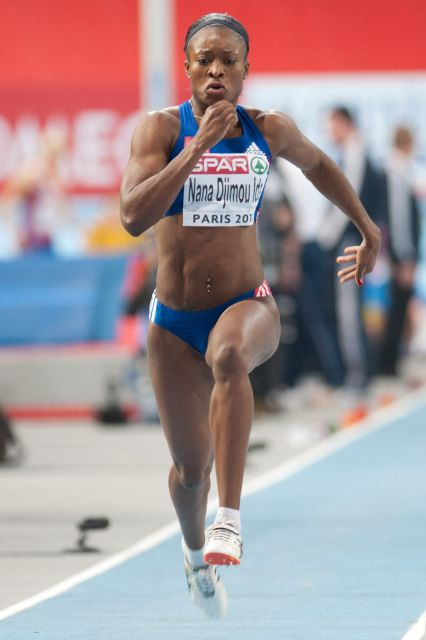
Pentathlon gold medallist Antoinette Nana Djimou Ida in the long jump

Event	Gold		Silver		Bronze	
60 metres	Olesya Povh; Ukraine	7.13 =EL	Mariya Ryemyen; Ukraine	7.15 =PB	Ezinne Okparaebo; Norway	7.20
400 metres	Denisa Rosolová; Czech Republic	51.73; PB	Olesya Krasnomovets; Russia	51.80	Kseniya Zadorina; Russia	52.03
800 metres *	Jenny Meadows; Great Britain	2:00.50	Linda Marguet; France	2:01.61	Marilyn Okoro; Great Britain	2:02.46
1500 metres	Elena Arzhakova; Russia	4:13.78	Nuria Fernández; Spain	4:14.04	Yekaterina Martynova; Russia	4:14.16
3000 metres	Helen Clitheroe; Great Britain	8:56.66	Lidia Chojecka; Poland	8:58.30	Layes Abdullayeva; Azerbaijan	9:00.37
60 m hurdles	Carolin Nytra; Germany	7.80; EL	Tiffany Ofili; Great Britain	7.80; NR, =EL	Christina Vukicevic; Norway	7.83; NR
4 × 400 m relay	Russia; Kseniya Zadorina; Kseniya Vdovina; Yelena Migunova; Olesya Forsheva	3:29.34	Great Britain; Kelly Sotherton; Lee McConnell; Marilyn Okoro; Jenny Meadows	3:31.36	France; Muriel Hurtis-Houairi; Laetitia Denis; Marie Gayot; Floria Gueï	3:32.16
WR world record | ER European record | CR championship record | NR national record | WL world leading | EL European leading | PB personal best | SB seasonal best

- Original 800m champion Yevgenia Zinurova of Russia was stripped of her title and banned for two years on 3 July 2012 following a doping offence.

=== Field ===
Event	Gold		Silver		Bronze	
High jump	Antonietta Di Martino; Italy	2.01	Ruth Beitia; Spain	1.96; SB	Ebba Jungmark; Sweden	1.96; PB
Pole vault	Anna Rogowska; Poland	4.85; NR =EL	Silke Spiegelburg; Germany	4.75	Kristina Gadschiew; Germany	4.65
Long jump	Darya Klishina; Russia	6.80	Naide Gomes; Portugal	6.79; SB	Yuliya Pidluzhnaya; Russia	6.75; PB
Triple jump	Simona La Mantia; Italy	14.60; WL PB	Olesya Zabara; Russia	14.45; SB	Dana Veldáková; Slovakia	14.39; SB
Shot put	Anna Avdeyeva; Russia	18.70; SB	Christina Schwanitz; Germany	18.65	Josephine Terlecki; Germany	18.09; PB
WR world record | ER European record | CR championship record | NR national record | WL world leading | EL European leading | PB personal best | SB seasonal best

=== Combined ===
Event	Gold		Silver		Bronze	
Pentathlon	Antoinette Nana Djimou Ida; France	4723; WL, NR	Austra Skujytė; Lithuania	4706; SB	Remona Fransen; Netherlands	4665; PB
WR world record | ER European record | CR championship record | NR national record | WL world leading | EL European leading | PB personal best | SB seasonal best

== Medal table ==
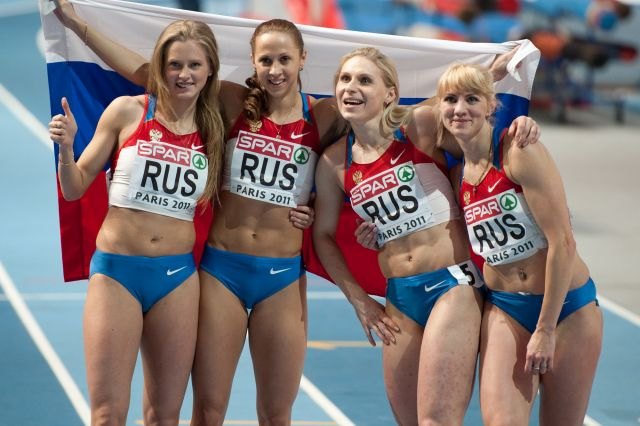
The Russian women were dominant in the 4×400 m relay.

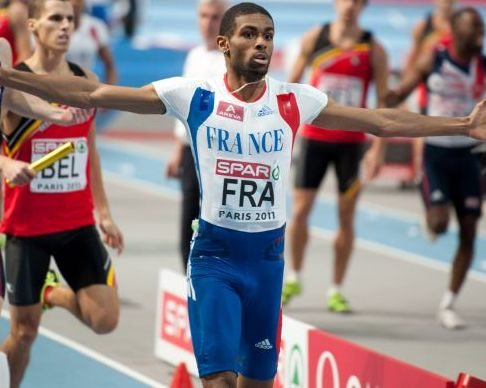
Yoann Décimus winning the men's relay gold for France

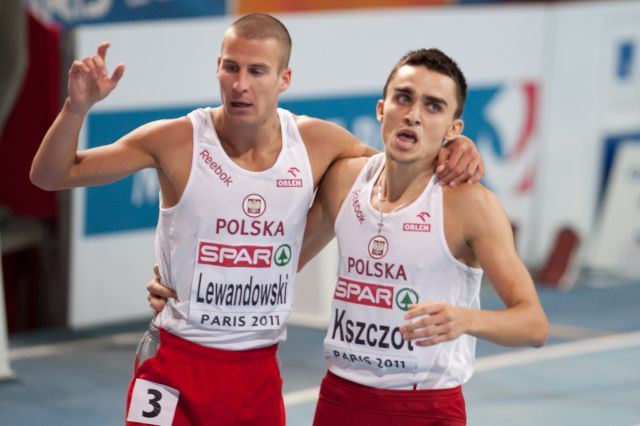
Marcin Lewandowski and Adam Kszczot claimed a 1–2 for Poland in the 800 m.

Rank	Nation	Gold	Silver	Bronze	Total
1	France	5	5	2	12
2	Russia	5	2	5	12
3	Germany	3	4	3	10
4	Great Britain	3	4	2	9
5	Poland	2	2	1	5
6	Czech Republic	2	1	1	4
7	Italy	2	1	0	3
8	Spain	1	2	1	4
9	Portugal	1	1	0	2
9	Ukraine	1	1	0	2
11	Belarus	1	0	0	1
12	Azerbaijan	0	1	1	2
12	Turkey	0	1	1	2
14	Lithuania	0	1	0	1
15	Belgium	0	0	2	2
15	Norway	0	0	2	2
17	Denmark	0	0	1	1
17	Netherlands	0	0	1	1
17	Romania	0	0	1	1
17	Slovakia	0	0	1	1
17	Sweden	0	0	1	1
Totals (21 entries)		26	26	26	78

== Participating nations ==
- Albania (2)
- Armenia (5)
- Austria (10)
- Azerbaijan (3)
- Belarus (20)
- Belgium (16)
- Bosnia and Herzegovina (5)
- Bulgaria (12)
- Croatia (8)
- Cyprus (3)
- Czech Republic (16)
- Denmark (11)
- Estonia (10)
- Finland (13)
- France (47)
- Georgia (2)
- Germany (38)
- Gibraltar (2)
- Great Britain (32)
- Greece (14)
- Hungary (5)
- Iceland (2)
- Ireland (7)
- Israel (4)
- Italy (27)
- Latvia (7)
- Lithuania (9)
- Macedonia (1)
- Malta (1)
- Moldova (2)
- Monaco (1)
- Netherlands (15)
- Norway (12)
- Poland (18)
- Portugal (15)
- Romania (16)
- Russia (55)
- San Marino (1)
- Serbia (6)
- Slovakia (6)
- Slovenia (9)
- Spain (34)
- Sweden (15)
- Switzerland (7)
- Turkey (12)
- Ukraine (25)
