= Nick Leavey =

British sprinter

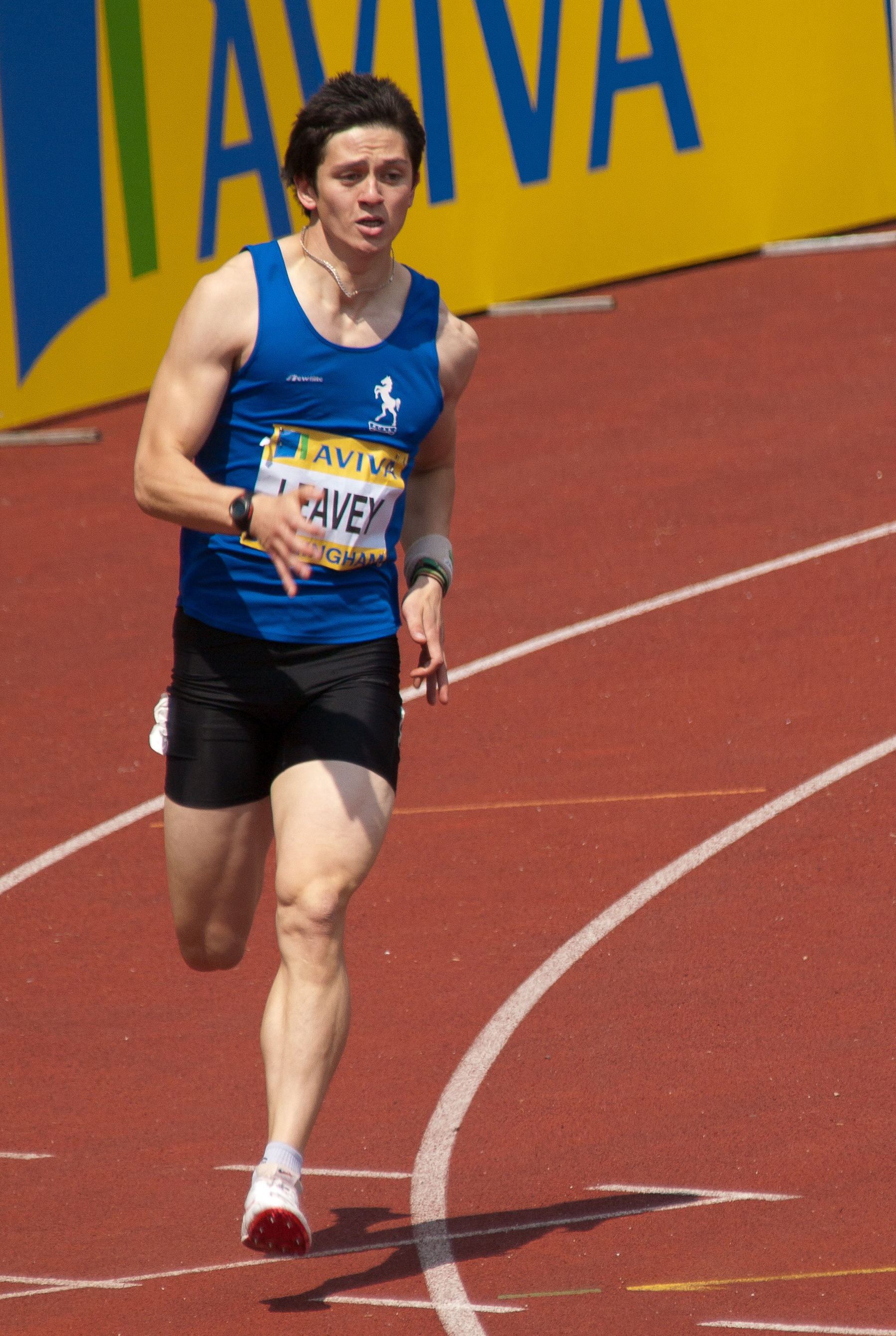
Nick Leavey at the 2010 UK Athletics Championships and European Trials.

Nick Leavey (born 27 August 1986) is a British sprint athlete.

== Achievements ==
Year	Competition	Venue	Position	Event	Notes
Representing United Kingdom
2009	European Indoor Championships	Turin, Italy	2nd	4 × 400 m relay	3:07.04
2009	European Indoor Championships	Turin, Italy	4th (sf)	400 m	47.93
2010	Commonwealth Games	New Delhi, India	3rd	4 × 400 m relay	3:03.97
2011	European Indoor Championships	Paris, France	2nd	4 × 400 m relay	3:06.46
