= Elena Kelety =

German hurdler (born 1999)

Personal information
- Born: 4 September 1999 (age 26)

Sport
- Sport: Athletics
- Event: Hurdles
Medal record
Women's athletics
Representing Germany
European Athletics U20 Championships
Silver medal – second place	2017 Grosseto	4 × 400 m relay

Elena Kelety (born 4 September 1999) is a German hurdler and former multi-event athlete.

== Early and personal life ==
From Frankfurt, she is a member of Frankfurt Athletics having started in the sport at the age of four years-old and previously also been a member of Königsteiner LV. She studied for a degree in biochemistry in Cologne before studying biomedical science at the University of South Carolina in the United States, and later also studied nutritional therapy. She competes in glasses having once lost a contact lens during a race.

== Career ==
Initially a multi-event athlete she competed in the heptathlon at the 2015 World Athletics Youth Championships in Cali, Colombia. After having elbow surgery in 2016, she won the German U20 Championships with 5331 points for the heptathlon in 2017. She was a silver medalist in Grosseto, Italy as a member of the German women’s 4 × 400 metres relay team at the 2017 European Athletics U20 Championships.

Complications following a fractured arm from a pole vault fall led her to focus on 400 metres hurdles, and she placed third in the German U23 Championships in 2019. However, more injury problems resulted in foot surgery. In 2023, she began to coached by Robert Schieferer. She ran 55.05 seconds for the 400 metres hurdles in Leuven, Belgium in July 2024, before lowering her personal best to 54.86 in Dresden in August 2024.

She finished fourth over 400 metres hurdles at the 2025 BAUHAUS-galan event in Stockholm, part of the 2025 Diamond League, running a personal best 54.79 seconds. She placed fourth in the 400 metres hurdles at the 2025 European Athletics Team Championships First Division in Madrid on 28 June 2025.

She competed at the 2025 World Athletics Championships in Tokyo, Japan, running 54.74 seconds to qualify for the semi-finals and running a new personal best of 54.61 seconds in the semi-final, without advancing to the final.
