= Solène Ndama =

French athletics competitor (born 1998)

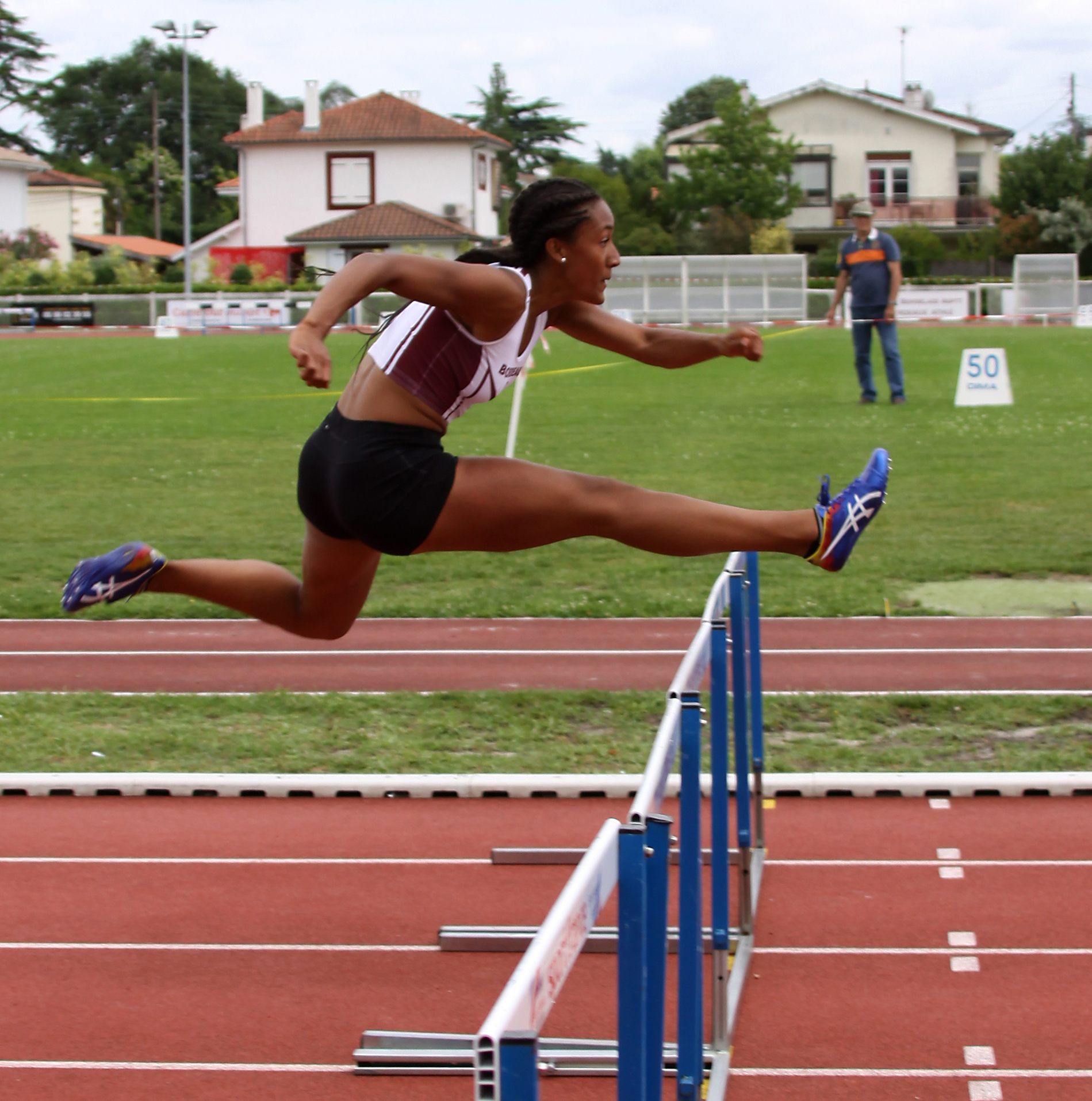
- Ndama in 2017

Personal information
- Born: 23 September 1998 (age 28) Bordeaux, France
- Height: 174 cm (5 ft 9 in)
- Weight: 69 kg (152 lb)

Sport
- Country: France
- Sport: Athletics
- Events: 100 m hurdles, heptathlon, pentathlon
- Club: Bordeaux athlé
- Coached by: Jean-Daniel Mirre; Laurent Moreschi
Medal record
Women's athletics
Representing France
European Indoor Championships
Bronze medal – third place	2019 Glasgow	Pentathlon

Solène Ndama (born 23 September 1998) is a French athlete competing in the 100 metres hurdles, heptathlon and pentathlon.

== Personal life ==
Born in France, Ndama is of Gabonese descent.

== Career ==
Ndama won the gold medal in the 100 metres hurdles at the 2017 European U20 Championships. She also made the final in the same event at the 2018 European Championships but was disqualified in it.

Ndama won the bronze medal and equalled Antoinette Nana Djimou's 8-year-old French national record of 4,723 points in the pentathlon at the 2019 European Athletics Indoor Championships.

In November 2025, Ndama was issued with a three-month ban for an anti-doping rule violation after testing positive for cannabis in May 2025.

== International competitions ==
Year	Competition	Venue	Position	Event	Notes
Representing France
2015	World Youth Championships	Cali, Colombia	29th	Heptathlon (youth)	4927 pts
2017	European U20 Championships	Grosseto, Italy	1st	100 m hurdles	13.15
2018	World Cup	London, United Kingdom	4th	100 m hurdles	13.02
2018	European Championships	Berlin, Germany	3rd (sf)	100 m hurdles	12.77^{1}
2019	European Indoor Championships	Glasgow, United Kingdom	9th (sf)	60 m hurdles	8.09
2019	European Indoor Championships	Glasgow, United Kingdom	3rd	Pentathlon	4723 pts, NR
2019	World Championships	Doha, Qatar	–	100 m hurdles	DNF
2019	World Championships	Doha, Qatar	14th	Heptathlon	6034 pts

^{1}Disqualified in the final

== Personal bests ==
Outdoor

- 200 metres – 24.05 (+1.8 m/s, Albi 2018)
- 800 metres – 2:11.97 (Talence 2019)
- 100 metres hurdles – 12.77 (+0.2 Berlin 2018)
- High jump – 1.75 (Talence 2019))
- Long jump – 6.38 (+0.8 m/s, Talence 2019))
- Shot put – 13.68 (Doha 2019)
- Javelin throw – 37.62 (Doha 2019)
- Heptathlon – 6290 (Talence 2019)

Indoor

- 60 metres – 7.83 (Bordeaux 2016)
- 800 metres – 2:11.92 (Glasgow 2019)
- 60 metres hurdles – 8.03 (Nantes 2019)
- High jump – 1.78 (Glasgow 2019)
- Long jump – 6.27 (Miramas 2019)
- Shot put – 14.47 (Miramas 2019)
- Pentathlon – 4723 (Glasgow 2019)
