= Thomas Schneider (sprinter) =

German sprinter

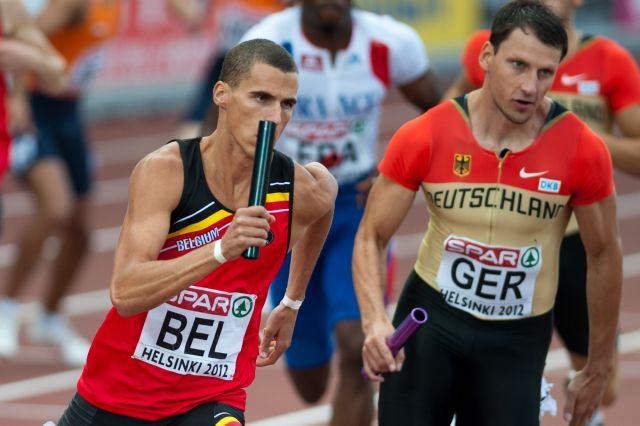
- Thomas Schneider (right) at the 2012 European Championships

Personal information
- Born: 7 November 1988 (age 36)
- Height: 1.85 m (6 ft 1 in)
- Weight: 83 kg (183 lb)

Sport
- Country: Germany
- Sport: Athletics
- Event: 4 × 400 m Relay

Thomas Schneider (born 7 November 1988 in Forst, Bezirk Cottbus) is a German sprint athlete.

== Achievements ==
Year	Competition	Venue	Position	Event	Notes
Representing Germany
2007	European Junior Championships	Hengelo, Netherlands	2nd	4 × 400 m relay	3:08.64
2009	European Team Championships	Leiria, Portugal	2nd	4 × 400 m relay	3:02.30
2010	European Championships	Barcelona, Spain	4th	4 × 400 m relay	3:02.65
2011	European Indoor Championships	Paris, France	2nd	400 m	46.42
2011	European Team Championships	Stockholm, Sweden	2nd	400 m	45.98
2011	European Team Championships	Stockholm, Sweden	3rd	4 × 400 m relay	3:04.10
2012	European Championships	Helsinki, Finland	3rd	4 × 400 m relay	3:01.77
2012	Olympics	London, Great Britain	6th (h)	4 × 400 m relay	3:03.05
2013	World Championships	Moscow, Russia	12th (h)	4 × 400 m relay	3:02.62
2014	European Championships	Zürich, Switzerland	6th	4 × 400 m relay	3:01.70
2015	IAAF World Relays	Nassau, Bahamas	3rd (B)	4 × 400 m relay	3:04.90
2017	IAAF World Relays	Nassau, Bahamas	6th (B)	4 × 400 m	3:09.53
