= 2011 European Athletics Indoor Championships – Men's 4 × 400 metres relay =

The Men's 4 × 400 metres relay race at the 2011 European Athletics Indoor Championships was held at March 6, 2011 at 17:40 local time.

== Records ==
Standing records prior to the 2011 European Athletics Indoor Championships
World record	United States (USA)	3:02.83	Maebashi, Japan	7 March 1999
European record	Poland (POL)	3:03.01	Maebashi, Japan	7 March 1999
Championship record	Poland (POL)	3:05.50	Vienna, Austria	3 March 2002
World Leading	University of Arkansas	3:05.13	Fayetteville, United States	27 February 2011
European Leading				

== Results ==
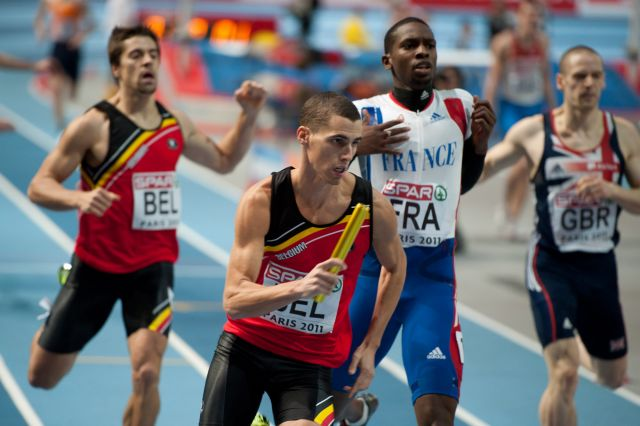
The last changeover of the race.

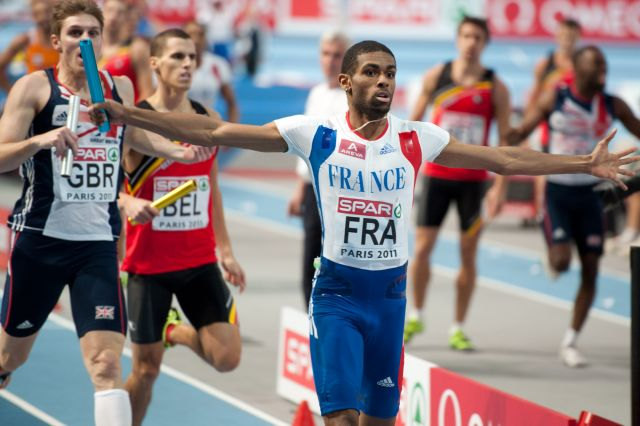
Yoan Décimus of France winning gold.

The final was held at 17:40.

Rank	Lane	Nationality	Athlete	React	Time	Notes
1st place, gold medalist(s)	1	France	Marc Macedot; Leslie Djhone; Mamoudou Hanne; Yoan Décimus	0.475	3:06.17	NR
2nd place, silver medalist(s)	4	United Kingdom	Nigel Levine; Nick Leavey; Richard Strachan; Richard Buck	0.180	3:06.46	
3rd place, bronze medalist(s)	5	Belgium	Jonathan Borlée; Antoine Gillet; Nils Duerinck; Kevin Borlée	0.221	3:06.57	NR
DQ	3	Russia	Dmitriy Buryak; Pavel Trenikhin; Sergey Petukhov; Denis Alekseyev	0.185	~~3:06.99~~	Doping
4	2	Poland	Mateusz Fórmański; Marcin Marciniszyn; Łukasz Krawczuk; Jakub Krzewina	0.225	3:09.31	
	6	Netherlands	Joeri Moerman; Youssef El Rhalfioui; Bjorn Blauwhof; Daniël Franken	0.243	DQ	R 170.9
