= List of French records in athletics =

The following are the national records in athletics in France maintained by France's national athletics federation – Fédération française d'athlétisme (FFA).

== Outdoor ==
Key to tables: Awaiting ratification Record not kept by FFA Not ratified or later rescinded by FFA

a = automatic timing but hundredths not known

=== Men ===
Event	Record	Athlete	Date	Meet	Place	Ref.	Video
100 y	9.43+ (−0.5 m/s)	Jimmy Vicaut	27 June 2013	Golden Spike Ostrava	Ostrava, Czech Republic		
100 m	9.86 (+1.3 m/s)	Jimmy Vicaut	4 July 2015	Meeting Areva	Saint-Denis, France		
100 m	9.86 (+1.8 m/s)	Jimmy Vicaut	7 June 2016	Meeting Pro Athlé Tour	Montreuil, France		
150 m (straight)	14.90 (−1.0 m/s)	Christophe Lemaitre	25 May 2013	Manchester City Games	Manchester, United Kingdom		
150 m (bend)	15.76 (+0.9 m/s)	Abdallah Kounta	5 May 2024	Internationales Läufermeeting	Pliezhausen, Germany		
200 m	19.80 (+0.8 m/s)	Christophe Lemaitre	3 September 2011	World Championships	Daegu, South Korea		
300 m	31.96	Marc Foucan	29 June 1999		Strasbourg, France		
400 m	44.24	Samuel Vessat	26 July 2026	French Championships	Albi, France		
600 m	1:13.21	Pierre-Ambroise Bosse	5 June 2016	British Grand Prix	Birmingham, Great Britain		
800 m	1:41.61	Gabriel Tual	7 July 2024	Meeting de Paris	Paris, France		
1000 m	2:13.96	Mehdi Baala	27 June 2003		Strasbourg, France		
1500 m	3:27.49	Azeddine Habz	20 June 2025	Meeting de Paris	Paris, France		
Mile	3:46.65	Azeddine Habz	5 July 2025	Prefontaine Classic	Eugene, United States		
Mile (road)	3:56.57	Maël Gouyette	1 October 2023	World Road Running Championships	Riga, Latvia		
Mile (road)	3:53.44	Flavien Szot	19 September 2026	World Road Running Championships	Copenhagen, Denmark		
2000 m	4:53.12	Mehdi Baala	23 June 2005		Strasbourg, France		
3000 m	7:28.67	Jimmy Gressier	17 June 2026	Meeting International de Montreuil	Montreuil, France		
Two miles	8:31.29	Etienne Daguinos	9 June 2023	Meeting de Paris	Paris, France		
5000 m	12:51.59	Jimmy Gressier	20 June 2025	Meeting de Paris	Paris, France		
5 km (road)	12:51	Jimmy Gressier	4 April 2026	Urban Trail de Lille	Lille, France		
10,000 m	26:58.67	Jimmy Gressier	2 August 2024	Olympic Games	Paris, France		
10 km (road)	27:04	Etienne Daguinos	16 November 2024	Urban Trail de Lille	Lille, France		
10 km (road)	26:43 (Note: by World Athletics source; 26:42 by FFA source)	Yann Schrub	22 February 2026	10K Facsa Castelló	Castellón de la Plana, Spain		
15 km (road)	41:56+	Julien Wanders	8 February 2019	RAK Half Marathon	Ras Al Khaimah, United Arab Emirates		
10 miles (road)	46:48	Abdellah Béhar	20 September 1998	Glen Dimplex Cross Border Challenge	Newry, United Kingdom		
20,000 m (track)	57:50.25+	Morhad Amdouni	19 September 2020		Lucciana, France		
20 km (road)	56:03+	Julien Wanders	8 February 2019	RAK Half Marathon	Ras Al Khaimah, United Arab Emirates		
One hour	20772 m	Morhad Amdouni	19 September 2020		Lucciana, France		
Half marathon	59:13	Julien Wanders	8 February 2019	RAK Half Marathon	Ras Al Khaimah, United Arab Emirates		
25,000 m (track)	1:15:56.7+	Dominique Chauvelier	13 June 1992		La Flèche, France		
25 km (road)	1:13:29+	Morhad Amdouni	3 April 2022	Paris Marathon	Paris, France		
30,000 m (track)	1:31:53.2	Dominique Chauvelier	13 June 1992		La Flèche, France		
30 km (road)	1:27:46+	Morhad Amdouni	18 February 2024	Seville Marathon	Seville, Spain		
Marathon	2:03:47	Morhad Amdouni	18 February 2024	Seville Marathon	Seville, Spain		
24 hours (road)	272.217 km	Erik Clavery	26–27 October 2019	IAU 24 Hour World Championship	Albi, France		
110 m hurdles	12.95 (+0.2 m/s)	Pascal Martinot-Lagarde	18 July 2014	Herculis	Fontvieille, Monaco		
200 m hurdles (straight)	23.51 (+2.0 m/s)	Victor Coroller	18 May 2018	Great CityGames Manchester	Manchester, United Kingdom		
400 m hurdles	47.37	Stéphane Diagana	5 July 1995	Athletissima	Lausanne, Switzerland		
2000 m steeplechase	5:10.68 ^{[WB]}	Mahiedine Mekhissi-Benabbad	30 June 2010	Alma Athlé Tour	Reims, France		
3000 m steeplechase	8:00.09	Mahiedine Mekhissi Benabbad	6 July 2013	Meeting Areva	Saint-Denis, France		
High jump	2.34 m A	Mickaël Hanany	22 March 2014	UTEP Springtime	El Paso, United States		
Pole vault	6.05 m (Note: Outdoor best; FFA recognizes the indoor mark as absolute record)	Renaud Lavillenie	30 May 2015	Prefontaine Classic	Eugene, United States		
Long jump	8.42 m (+0.4 m/s)	Salim Sdiri	12 June 2009		Pierre-Bénite, France		
Triple jump	18.04 m (+0.3 m/s)	Teddy Tamgho	18 August 2013	World Championships	Moscow, Russia		
Shot put	20.75 m	Frederic Dagee	26 June 2021	French Championships	Angers, France		
Discus throw	70.25 m	Lolassonn Djouhan	21 June 2025	Meeting Ville d'Alès	Alès, France		
Hammer throw	82.44 m	Yann Chaussinand	13 June 2026	USATF LA Grand Prix	Los Angeles, United States		
Javelin throw	86.11 m	Teuraiterai Tupaia	17 May 2024	Meeting National de Seine et Mar	Fontainebleau, France		
Decathlon	9126 pts	Kevin Mayer	15–16 September 2018	Décastar	Talence, France		
Decathlon	100m (wind) / Long jump (wind) / Shot put / High jump / 400m / 110m H (wind) / Discus / Pole vault / Javelin / 1500m; 10.55 (+0.3 m/s) / 7.80 m (+1.2 m/s) / 16.00 m / 2.05 m / 48.42 / 13.75 (−1.1 m/s) / 50.54 m / 5.45 m / 71.90 m / 4:36.11						
5000 m walk (track)	18:02.38	Gabriel Bordier	10 June 2025	Meeting International de Montreuil	Montreuil, France		
10,000 m walk (track)	37:23.99	Gabriel Bordier	2 August 2025	French Championships	Talence, France		
1 hour walk (track)	15395 m	Yohann Diniz	13 March 2010	Critérium régional de l'heure à la marche	Reims, France		
20,000 m walk (track)	1:19:42.0	Yohann Diniz	25 April 2014		Bogny-sur-Meuse, France		
20 km walk (road)	1:17:02	Yohann Diniz	8 March 2015	French Championships	Arles, France		
2 hours walk (track)	29090 m +	Thierry Toutain	24 March 1991		Héricourt, France		
30,000 m walk (track)	2:03:56.5	Thierry Toutain	24 March 1991		Héricourt, France		
35 km walk (road)	2:25:57	Aurélien Quinion	28 October 2023	Lusatian International Race-Walking Meeting	Zittau, Germany		
50,000 m walk (track)	3:35:27.20	Yohann Diniz	12 March 2011		Reims, France		
50 km walk (road)	3:32:33	Yohann Diniz	15 August 2014	European Championships	Zürich, Switzerland		
4 × 100 m relay	37.79	France; Max Moriniére; Daniel Sangouma; Jean-Charles Trouabal; Bruno Marie-Rose	1 September 1990	European Championships	Split, Yugoslavia		
4 × 200 m relay	1:20.66	France; Christophe Lemaitre; Yannick Fonsat; Ben Bassaw; Ken Romain	24 May 2014	IAAF World Relays	Nassau, Bahamas		
4 × 400 m relay	2:58.45	France; Ludvy Vaillant; Gilles Biron; David Sombe; Téo Andant	27 August 2023	World Championships	Budapest, Hungary		
4 × 800 m relay	7:13.6a	France; R. Sanchez; J. Riquelme; Philippe Dupont; R. Milhau	23 June 1979		Bourges, France		
4 × 1500 m relay	14:48.2a	France; D. Begouin; D. Lequement; M. Philippe; Philippe Dien	23 June 1979		Bourges, France		

=== Women ===
Event	Record	Athlete	Date	Meet	Place	Ref.
100 m	10.73 (+2.0 m/s)	Christine Arron	19 August 1998	European Championships	Budapest, Hungary	
150 m (bend)	16.73 NWI	Rose-Aimée Bacoul	30 July 1984		San Diego, United States	
200 m	21.99 (+1.1 m/s)	Marie-José Pérec	2 July 1993		Villeneuve-d'Ascq, France	
300 m	35.00+	Marie-José Pérec	27 August 1991	World Championships	Tokyo, Japan	
400 m	48.25	Marie-José Pérec	29 July 1996	Olympic Games	Atlanta, United States	
800 m	1:55.65	Anaïs Bourgoin	28 June 2026	Meeting de Paris	Paris, France	
1000 m	2:31.93	Patricia Djaté-Taillard	25 August 1995	Memorial Van Damme	Brussels, Belgium	
1500 m	3:56.24	Agathe Guillemot	28 June 2026	Meeting de Paris	Paris, France	
Mile	4:19.08	Agathe Guillemot	19 July 2025	London Athletics Meet	London, United Kingdom	
Mile (road)	4:34.41 Wo	Berenice Cleyet-Merle	1 October 2023	World Road Running Championships	Riga, Latvia	
Mile (road)	4:22.74 Wo	Agathe Guillemot	19 September 2026	World Road Running Championships	Copenhagen, Denmark	
2000 m	5:32.63	Agathe Guillemot	12 July 2024	Herculis	Fontvieille, Monaco	
3000 m	8:35.41	Bouchra Ghezielle	1 July 2005		Saint-Denis, France	
3000 m	8:32.86	Cassandre Beaugrand	10 July 2026	Meeting International d’Athlétisme Herculis EBS	Fontvieille, Monaco	
5000 m	14:43.90	Margaret Maury	3 September 2004	Memorial Van Damme	Brussels, Belgium	
5000 m	14:37.80	Sarah Madeleine	4 June 2026	Golden Gala	Rome, Italy	
5 km (road)	14:53	Cassandre Beaugrand	9 February 2025	Monaco Run Gramaglia	Monaco	
10,000 m	31:23.45	Mekdes Woldu	14 June 2025	Gouden Spike	Leiden, Netherlands	
10 km (road)	31:00	Alessia Zarbo	6 September 2025		Prague, Czech Republic	
10 km (road)	30:52	Cassandre Beaugrand	4 April 2026	Urban Trail de Lille	Lille, France	
15 km (road)	48:06+	Mekdes Woldu	11 October 2026	Harmonie Mutuelle 20km de Paris	Paris, France	
One hour	17332 m Mx	Valerie Duvialard	23 March 1996		Rouen, France	
20 km (road)	1:04:37	Mekdes Woldu	11 October 2026	Harmonie Mutuelle 20km de Paris	Paris, France	
Half marathon	1:08:20 Mx	Alessia Zarbo	26 October 2025	Valencia Half Marathon	Valencia, Spain	
Half marathon	1:08:20 Mx	Mekdes Woldu	8 March 2026	EDP Lisbon Half Marathon	Lisbon, Portugal	
Half marathon	1:08:48 Wo	Christelle Daunay	29 March 2014	World Half Marathon Championships	Copenhagen, Denmark	
25 km (road)	1:24:01+	Clémence Calvin	14 April 2019	Paris Marathon	Paris, France	
30 km (road)	1:41:00	Clémence Calvin	14 April 2019	Paris Marathon	Paris, France	
Marathon	2:23:36	Manon Trapp	23 February 2025	Seville Marathon	Seville, Spain	
Marathon	2:23:13	Mekdes Woldu	16 March 2025	Barcelona Marathon	Barcelona, Spain	
100 km (road)	7:04:03 Mx	Floriane Hot	27 August 2022	IAU 100 km World Championships	Berlin, Germany	
24 hours	253.581 km	Stephanie Gicquel	17–18 September 2022	IAU 24 Hour European Championships	Verona, Italy	
100 m hurdles	12.31 (+0.8 m/s)	Cyréna Samba-Mayela	8 June 2024	European Championships	Rome, Italy	
200 m hurdles	25.82 (+1.7 m/s)	Patricia Girard	22 September 1999		Nantes, France	
200 m hurdles	25.6 h (−0.7 m/s)	Patricia Girard	23 August 2001		Nantes, France	
400 m hurdles	53.21	Marie-José Pérec	16 August 1995	Weltklasse Zürich	Zürich, Switzerland	
3000 m steeplechase	8:58.67	Alice Finot	6 August 2024	Olympic Games	Paris, France	
High jump	1.96 m	Maryse Éwanjé-Épée	21 July 1985		Colombes, France	
High jump	1.96 m	Melanie Melfort	11 August 2007		Castres, France	
Pole vault	4.75 m	Ninon Guillon-Romarin	20 July 2018	Herculis	Fontvieille, Monaco	
Long jump	7.05 m (−0.4 m/s)	Eunice Barber	14 September 2003	IAAF World Athletics Final	Fontvieille, Monaco	
Triple jump	14.69 m (+2.0 m/s)	Teresa Nzola Meso Ba	23 June 2007	European Cup, Superleague	Munich, Germany	
Shot put	18.68 m	Laurence Manfredi	27 July 2000		Castres, France	
Discus throw	66.73 m	Mélina Robert-Michon	16 August 2016	Olympic Games	Rio de Janeiro, Brazil	
Hammer throw	75.38 m	Alexandra Tavernier	21 February 2021	French Winter Long Throws Championships	Salôn-de-Provence, France	
Javelin throw	63.54 m	Mathilde Andraud	21 May 2016	Werfertage	Halle, Germany	
Heptathlon	6889 pts	Eunice Barber	3–4 June 2005		Arles, France	
Heptathlon	100m H (wind) / High jump / Shot put / 200m (wind) / Long jump (wind) / Javelin / 800m; 12.62 (+2.9 m/s) / 1.91 m / 12.61 m / 24.12 (+1.2 m/s) / 6.78 m (+3.4 m/s) / 53.07 m / 2:14.66					
Decathlon	8150 pts	Marie Collonvillé	25–26 September 2004	Décastar	Talence, France	
Decathlon	100m (wind) / Discus / Pole vault / Javelin / 400m / 100m H (wind) / Long jump (wind) / Shot put / High jump / 1500m; 12.48 (+0.4 m/s) / 34.69 m / 3.50 m / 47.19 m / 56.15 / 13.96 (+0.4 m/s) / 6.18 m (+1.0 m/s) / 11.90 m / 1.80 m / 5:06.09					
5000 m walk (track)	21:41.72	Emilie Menuet	17 June 2017	Meeting National Michel Musson	Blois, France	
10,000 m walk (track)	43:35.52 (Note: by World Athletics source; 43:35.32 by FAA source)	Clémence Beretta	27 January 2024	Supernova	Canberra, Australia	
10 km walk (road)	44:02	Chloe Le Roch	18 May 2025	European Race Walking Team Championships	Poděbrady, Czech Republic	
20,000 m walk (track)	1:34:57.1	Christine Guinaudeau	26 April 2009		La Londe-les-Maures, France	
20 km walk (road)	1:30:20	Clémence Beretta	12 March 2023		Aix-les-Bains, France	
20 km walk (road)	1:28:05	Clemence Beretta	18 May 2025	European Race Walking Team Championships	Poděbrady, Czech Republic	
50 km walk (road)	4:43:46	Ines Pastorino	14 October 2018		Aschersleben, Germany	
4 × 100 m relay	41.78	France; Patricia Girard-Léno; Muriel Hurtis; Sylviane Félix; Christine Arron	30 August 2003	World Championships	Saint-Denis, France	
4 × 200 m relay	1:32.16	France; Carolle Zahi; Estelle Raffai; Cynthia Leduc; Maroussia Paré	12 May 2019	IAAF World Relays	Yokohama, Japan	
4 × 400 m relay	3:22.34	France; Francine Landre; Evelyn Elien; Viviane Dorsile; Marie-José Pérec	14 August 1994	European Championships	Helsinki, Finland	
4 × 400 m relay	3:21.41	France; Sounkamba Sylla; Shana Grebo; Amandine Brossier; Louise Maraval	10 August 2024	Olympic Games	Saint-Denis, France	
4 × 800 m relay	8:17.54	France; Justine Fedronic; Clarisse Moh; Lisa Blameble; Rénelle Lamote	25 May 2014	IAAF World Relays	Nassau, Bahamas	
Distance medley relay	11:06.33	France; Rénelle Lamote (1200 m); Elea-Mariama Diarra (400 m); Clarisse Moh (800 m); Claire Perraux (1600 m)	2 May 2015	IAAF World Relays	Nassau, Bahamas	

=== Mixed ===
Event	Record	Athlete	Date	Meet	Place	Ref.
4 × 100 m relay	41.28	France; Lucie Jean-Charles; Noemie Denon; Dylan Vermont; Antoine Thoraval	10 May 2025	World Relays	Guangzhou, China	
4 × 100 m relay	40.99	France; Ylann Bizasene; Chloé Galet; Théo Schaub; Sarah Richard	28 June 2026	Meeting de Paris	Paris, France	
4 × 400 m relay	3:10.60	France; Muhammad Kounta; Louise Maraval; Téo Andant; Amandine Brossier	2 August 2024	Olympic Games	Saint-Denis, France	

== Indoor ==
=== Men ===
Event	Record	Athlete	Date	Meet	Place	Ref.	Video
50 m	5.65	Stephane Cali	20 February 1998		Eaubonne, France		
50 m	5.5 h	Claude Piquemal	7 December 1963		Antwerp, Belgium		
60 m	6.45	Ronald Pognon	13 February 2005	BW-Bank Meeting	Karlsruhe, Germany		
200 m	20.36	Bruno Marie-Rose	22 February 1987	Meeting Pas de Calais	Liévin, France		
300 m	32.47	Leslie Djhone	5 March 2010	Meeting Pas de Calais	Liévin, France		
400 m	45.54	Leslie Djhone	5 March 2011	European Championships	Paris, France		
600 m	1:15.09	Yanis Meziane	8 February 2025	Meeting Metz Moselle Athleor	Metz, France		
800 m	1:44.82	Mehdi Baala	18 February 2003	GE Galan	Stockholm, Sweden		
1000 m	2:17.01	Mehdi Baala	13 February 2005	BW-Bank Meeting	Karlsruhe, Germany		
1500 m	3:32.24+	Azzedine Habz	8 February 2025	Millrose Games	New York City, United States		
Mile	3:47.56	Azzedine Habz	8 February 2025	Millrose Games	New York City, United States		
2000 m	4:57.22	Azeddine Habz	17 February 2022	Meeting Hauts-de-France Pas-de-Calais	Liévin, France		
3000 m	7:31.50	Azeddine Habz	2 February 2025	New Balance Indoor Grand Prix	Boston, United States		
3000 m	7:29.38 (Note: indoor mark ratified as absolute record)	Yann Schrub	8 February 2026	Meeting Metz Moselle Athlélor Crédit Mutuel	Metz, France		
5000 m	12:54.92	Jimmy Gressier	14 February 2025	BU David Hemery Valentine International	Boston, United States		
50 m hurdles	6.36+	Ladji Doucouré	26 February 2005	Meeting Pas de Calais	Liévin, France		
55 m hurdles	7.01	Stéphane Caristan	27 February 1987	USA Championships	New York City, United States		
60 m hurdles	7.41	Dimitri Bascou	13 February 2016	ISTAF Indoor	Berlin, Germany		
110 m hurdles	13.51	Dan Philibert	4 February 1998		Tampere, Finland		
400 m hurdles	50.47	Sébastien Maillard	6 February 2010	Meeting National Val-de-Reuil	Val-de-Reuil, France		
High jump	2.35 m (Note: outdoor mark ratified as absolute record)	Jean-Charles Gicquel	13 March 1994		Paris-Bercy, France		
Pole vault	6.16 m	Renaud Lavillenie	15 February 2014	Pole Vault Stars	Donetsk, Ukraine		
Long jump	8.27 m	Salim Sdiri	28 January 2006		Mondeville, France		
Triple jump	17.92 m (2nd jump) (WR)	Teddy Tamgho	6 March 2011	European Championships	Paris, France		
Triple jump	17.92 m (4th jump)	Teddy Tamgho	6 March 2011	European Championships	Paris, France		
Shot put	20.51 m	Fred Moudani-Likibi	4 February 2023		Blacksburg, United States		
Weight throw	22.41 m	Jérôme Bortoluzzi	13 December 2014	Texas A&M Reveille Invitational	College Station, United States		
Discus throw	60.70 m	Lolassonn Djouhan	26 January 2018	ISTAF Indoor	Berlin, Germany		
Heptathlon	6479 pts	Kevin Mayer	4–5 March 2017	European Championships	Belgrade, Serbia		
Heptathlon	60m / Long jump / Shot put / High jump / 60m H / Pole vault / 1000m; 6.95 / 7.54 m / 15.66 m / 2.10 m / 7.88 m / 5.40 m / 2:41.08						
5000 m walk	18:16.76	Yohann Diniz	7 December 2014		Reims, France		
4 × 200 m relay	1:24.00	France; Daniel Sangouma; Jean-Charles Trouabal; Christophe Goris; Bruno Marie-Rose	6 February 1988		Glasgow, United Kingdom		
4 × 400 m relay	3:06.17	France; Marc Macedot; Leslie Djhone; Mamoudou Elimane Hanne; Yoan Décimus	6 March 2011	European Championships	Paris, France		
4 × 400 m relay	3:05.83	France; Yann Spillmann; Predea Manounou; Felix Levasseur; Téo Andant	6 March 2025	European Championships	Apeldoorn, Netherlands		
4 × 800 m relay	7:25.8 h	France; M. Lurot; J.C. Durand; Gerard Vervoot; M. Samper	14 February 1964		Stuttgart, West Germany		

=== Women ===
Event	Record	Athlete	Date	Meet	Place	Ref.
50 m	6.11	Christine Arron	26 February 2006		Aubière, France	
50 m	6.0 h	Annie Alize	15 January 1977		Grenoble, France	
50 m	6.0 h	Laurence Bily	17 January 1985		Paris, France	
60 m	7.06	Christine Arron	26 February 2006		Aubière, France	
100 m	11.18	Christine Arron	4 February 1998	Stars Games	Tampere, Finland	
200 m	22.49	Muriel Hurtis	14 March 2003	World Championships	Birmingham, United Kingdom	
300 m	36.46	Floria Gueï	21 February 2016		Metz, France	
400 m	51.44	Marie-José Pérec	18 February 1996	Meeting Pas de Calais	Liévin, France	
600 m	1:26.17	Anaïs Bourgoin	1 February 2026	Millrose Games	New York City, United States	
800 m	1:58.48	Noélie Yarigo (Note: dual citizenship (Benin and France))	8 February 2023	Copernicus Cup	Toruń, Poland	
1000 m	2:37.87	Patricia Djaté-Taillard	28 February 1997		Eaubonne, France	
1500 m	4:04.64	Agathe Guillemot	10 February 2024	Meeting Hauts-de-France Pas-de-Calais	Liévin, France	
1500 m	4:02.12	Agathe Guillemot	8 February 2026	Indoor Meeting Karlsruhe	Karlsruhe, Germany	
1500 m	4:00.64	Agathe Guillemot	22 February 2026	Copernicus Cup	Toruń, Poland	
1500 m	3:59.71	Agathe Guillemot	22 March 2026	World Championships	Toruń, Poland	
Mile	4:25.99	Agathe Guillemot	2 February 2025	Meeting de L'Eure	Val-de-Reuil, France	
Mile	4:23.27	Agathe Guillemot	1 February 2026	Meeting de L'Eure	Val-de-Reuil, France	
2000 m	5:32.18	Agathe Guillemot	19 February 2026	Meeting Hauts-de-France Pas-de-Calais	Liévin, France	
3000 m	8:39.13	Sarah Madeleine	19 February 2026	Meeting Hauts-de-France Pas-de-Calais	Liévin, France	
5000 m	15:31.62	Liv Westphal	6 December 2014	Boston University Season Opener	Boston, United States	
50 m hurdles	6.76	Patricia Girard	13 February 2000	Meeting Pas de Calais	Liévin, France	
50 m hurdles	6.73+	Laëticia Bapté	13 February 2025	Meeting Hauts-de-France Pas-de-Calais	Liévin, France	
60 m hurdles	7.73	Cyréna Samba-Mayela	3 March 2024	World Championships	Glasgow, United Kingdom	
400 m hurdles	59.31	Cecile Bernaleau	29 January 2011		Bordeaux, France	
2000m steeplechase	6:15.35	Alexa Lemitre	9 February 2021	Meeting Hauts-de-France Pas-de-Calais	Liévin, France	
High jump	1.97 m	Melanie Melfort	5 February 2003		Dortmund, Germany	
High jump	1.97 m	Melanie Melfort	18 February 2007		Aubière, France	
Pole vault	4.76 m	Marie-Julie Bonnin	22 February 2026	All Star Perche	Clermont-Ferrand, France	
Long jump	6.90 m	Éloyse Lesueur	2 March 2013	European Championships	Gothenburg, Sweden	
Triple jump	14.53	Teresa Nzola Meso Ba	13 February 2008		Athens, Greece	
Shot put	18.69 m	Laurence Manfredi	19 February 2000	Meeting Pas de Calais	Liévin, France	
Pentathlon	4723 pts	Antoinette Nana Djimou	4 March 2011	European Championships	Paris, France	
Pentathlon	60m H / High jump / Shot put / Long jump / 800m; 8.11 / 1.80 m / 14.81 m / 6.34 m / 2:18.99					
Pentathlon	4723 pts	Solène Ndama	1 March 2019	European Championships	Glasgow, United Kingdom	
Pentathlon	60m H / High jump / Shot put / Long jump / 800m; 8.09 / 1.78 m / 14.23 m / 6.21 m / 2:11.92					
3000 m walk	12:26.45	Pauline Stey	11 February 2023	French Racewalking Championships	Val-de-Reuil, France	
4 × 200 m relay	1:34.47	France; Patricia Girard; Fabienne Ficher; Marie-Christine Cazier-Ballo; Odiah Sidibé	10 February 1990		Paris-Bercy, France	
4 × 400 m relay	3:25.80	France; Camille Seri; Louise Maraval; Marjorie Veyssiere; Amandine Brossier	6 March 2025	European Championships	Apeldoorn, Netherlands	
