= Jente Bouckaert =

Belgian sprinter

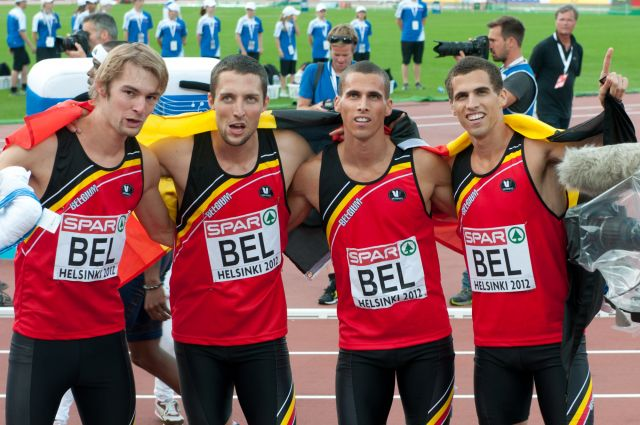
- Jente Bouckaert, Antoine Gillet, Kevin and Jonathan Borlée

Personal information
- Full name: Jente Bouckaert
- Born: 15 January 1990 (age 36)

Sport
- Country: Belgium
- Sport: Athletics
- Event: Sprint
Medal record
European Championships
Gold medal – first place	2012 Helsinki	4 × 400 m relay

Jente Bouckaert (born 15 January 1990) is a Belgian athlete who competes in the sprint.

Bouckaert won the gold medal at the 2012 European Athletics Championships in Helsinki at the 4 × 400 metres relay.

== See also ==
- Belgian men's 4 × 400 metres relay team
