= 2019 European Athletics Indoor Championships – Women's pentathlon =

The women's pentathlon event at the 2019 European Athletics Indoor Championships was held on 1 March.

== Medalists ==
Gold	Silver	Bronze
Katarina Johnson-Thompson; United Kingdom	Niamh Emerson; United Kingdom	Solene Ndama; France

== Records ==
Standing records prior to the 2019 European Athletics Indoor Championships
World record	Natallia Dobrynska (UKR)	5013	Istanbul, Turkey	9 March 2012
European record	Natallia Dobrynska (UKR)	5013	Istanbul, Turkey	9 March 2012
Championship record	Katarina Johnson-Thompson (GBR)	5000	Prague, Czech Republic	6 March 2015
World Leading	Solene Ndama (FRA)	4672	Miramas, France	17 February 2019
European Leading	Solene Ndama (FRA)	4672	Miramas, France	17 February 2019

== Results ==
=== 60 metres hurdles ===
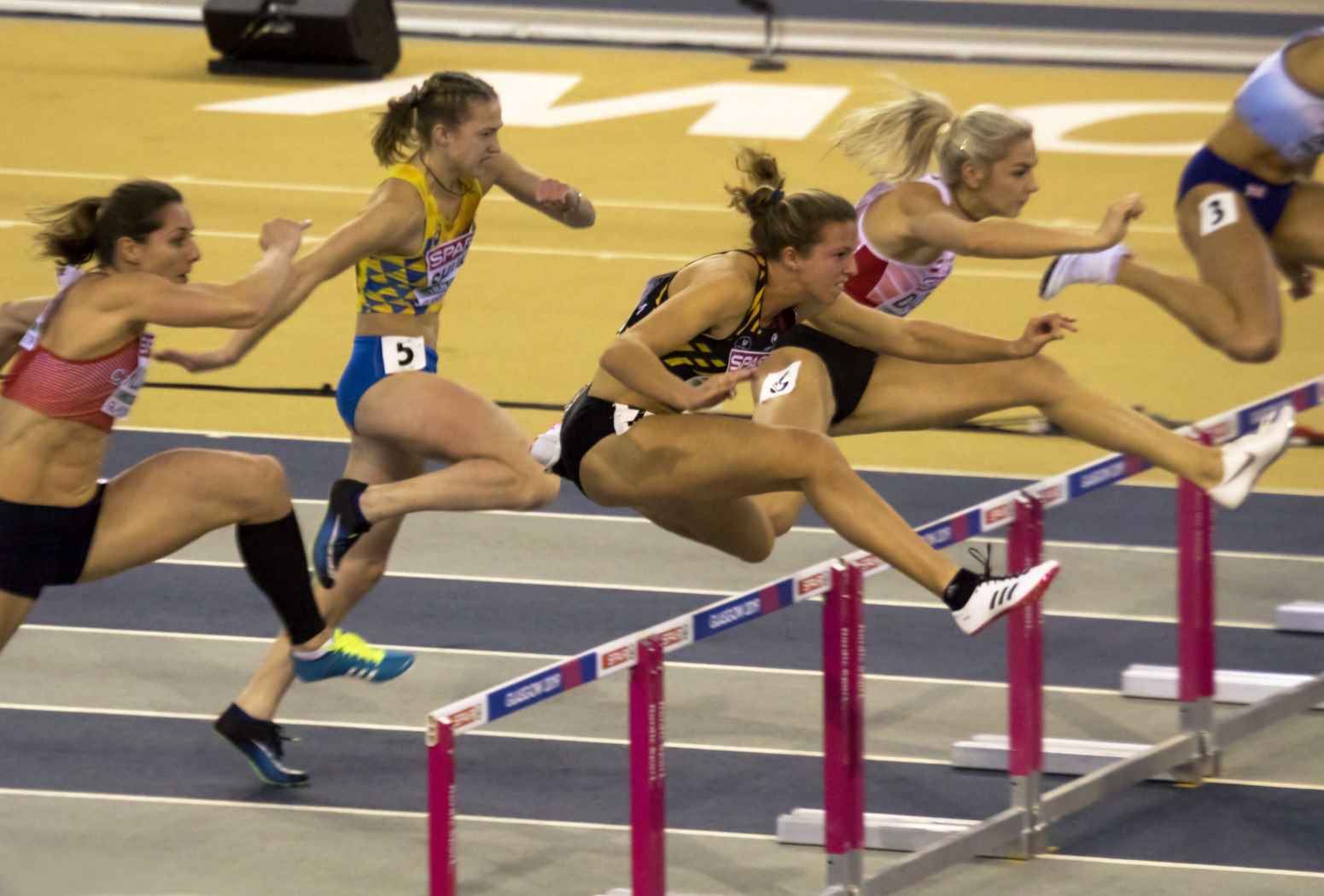
Heat 1

Rank	Heat	Lane	Athlete	Nationality	Time	Notes	Points
1	2	4	Solene Ndama	France	8.09	CB	1109
2	2	8	Katarina Johnson-Thompson	Great Britain	8.27	=SB	1068
3	2	3	Laura Ikauniece	Latvia	8.29	PB	1064
4	2	6	Anouk Vetter	Netherlands	8.33	SB	1055
5	2	5	María Vicente	Spain	8.36		1048
6	1	4	Verena Preiner	Austria	8.38	PB	1044
7	2	7	Xénia Krizsán	Hungary	8.45		1028
8	1	6	Ivona Dadic	Austria	8.53	SB	1010
9	1	3	Niamh Emerson	Great Britain	8.54	PB	1008
10	1	7	Hanne Maudens	Belgium	8.59	=PB	997
11	1	8	Eliška Klučinová	Czech Republic	8.74		965
12	1	5	Alina Shukh	Ukraine	8.89		933

=== High jump ===
Rank	Group	Athlete	Nationality	1.60	1.63	1.66	1.69	1.72	1.75	1.78	1.81	1.84	1.87	1.90	1.93	1.96	1.99	Result	Points	Note	Total
1	A	Katarina Johnson-Thompson	Great Britain	–	–	–	–	–	–	–	o	o	xo	xo	xo	o	xxx	1.96	1184	CHB	2252
2	A	Niamh Emerson	Great Britain	–	–	–	–	–	o	o	xo	o	xo	xxx				1.87	1067	PB	2075
3	A	Ivona Dadic	Austria	–	–	–	o	o	o	o	o	o	xxx					1.84	1029	SB	2039
4	B	Laura Ikauniece	Latvia	–	–	–	–	o	o	o	o	xxo	xr					1.84	1029	SB	2093
4	A	Alina Shukh	Ukraine	–	–	–	–	o	o	o	o	xxo	xxx					1.84	1029	SB	1962
6	B	Xénia Krizsán	Hungary	–	o	–	o	o	o	xo	xxx							1.78	953	SB	1981
7	B	Solene Ndama	France	–	–	o	o	o	xo	xxo	xxx							1.78	953	PB	2062
8	B	Hanne Maudens	Belgium	–	–	o	o	o	xo	xxx								1.75	916		1913
8	B	Verena Preiner	Austria	–	o	o	o	o	xo	xxx								1.75	916	PB	1960
8	B	Anouk Vetter	Netherlands	–	–	o	o	o	xo	xxx								1.75	916		1971
11	A	María Vicente	Spain	o	–	o	–	xo	o	xxx								1.75	916		1964
12	A	Eliška Klučinová	Czech Republic	–	–	–	–	o	–	xxx								1.72	879		1844

=== Shot put ===
Rank	Athlete	Nationality	#1	#2	#3	Result	Notes	Points	Total
1	Anouk Vetter	Netherlands	15.40	14.75	x	15.40		888	2859
2	Eliška Klučinová	Czech Republic	x	14.73	14.43	14.73		843	2687
3	Verena Preiner	Austria	14.32	x	14.10	14.32		815	2775
4	Alina Shukh	Ukraine	13.92	x	14.28	14.28		813	2775
5	Solene Ndama	France	13.50	12.96	14.23	14.23		809	2871
6	Xénia Krizsán	Hungary	14.01	14.17	14.16	14.17	SB	805	2786
7	Niamh Emerson	Great Britain	13.93	x	12.80	13.93	PB	789	2864
8	Ivona Dadic	Austria	13.33	x	x	13.33		749	2788
9	Laura Ikauniece	Latvia	13.31	13.19	x	13.31		748	2841
10	Katarina Johnson-Thompson	Great Britain	13.15	12.19	12.82	13.15	PB	737	2989
11	Hanne Maudens	Belgium	13.04	12.74	12.94	13.04		730	2643
12	María Vicente	Spain	12.31	12.82	12.79	12.82	PB	715	2679

=== Long jump ===
Rank	Athlete	Nationality	#1	#2	#3	Result	Note	Points	Total
1	Katarina Johnson-Thompson	United Kingdom	X	6.53	X	6.53		1017	4006
2	Ivona Dadic	Austria	6.06	X	6.42	6.42	PB	981	3769
3	María Vicente	Spain	6.33	6.31	6.26	6.33		953	3632
4	Laura Ikauniece	Latvia	6.12	6.33	6.31	6.33	SB	953	3794
5	Hanne Maudens	Belgium	6.33	6.20	6.07	6.33		953	3596
6	Niamh Emerson	United Kingdom	5.96	5.92	6.29	6.29	PB	940	3804
7	Solene Ndama	France	6.21	X	6.11	6.21		915	3786
8	Verena Preiner	Austria	6.13	6.15	6.01	6.15	PB	896	3671
9	Xénia Krizsán	Hungary	6.00	6.05	X	6.05		865	3651
10	Eliška Klučinová	Czech Republic	5.94	5.89	5.83	5.94		831	3518
11	Alina Shukh	Ukraine	5.84	5.54	X	5.84		801	3576
	Anouk Vetter	Netherlands				DNS		0	DNF

=== 800 metres ===
Rank	Athlete	Nationality	Time	Notes	Points	Total
1	Katarina Johnson-Thompson	United Kingdom	2:09.13		977	4983
2	Verena Preiner	Austria	2:09.91		966	4637
3	Xénia Krizsán	Hungary	2:10.50		957	4608
4	Solene Ndama	France	2:11.92		937	4723
5	Ivona Dadic	Austria	2:12.15		933	4702
6	Niamh Emerson	United Kingdom	2:12.56		927	4731
7	Laura Ikauniece	Latvia	2:14.01		907	4701
8	Hanne Maudens	Belgium	2:18.47		844	4440
9	María Vicente	Spain	2:27.00		731	4363
	Eliška Klučinová	Czech Republic	DNF		0	3518
	Alina Shukh	Ukraine	DNS		0	DNF

=== Final standings ===
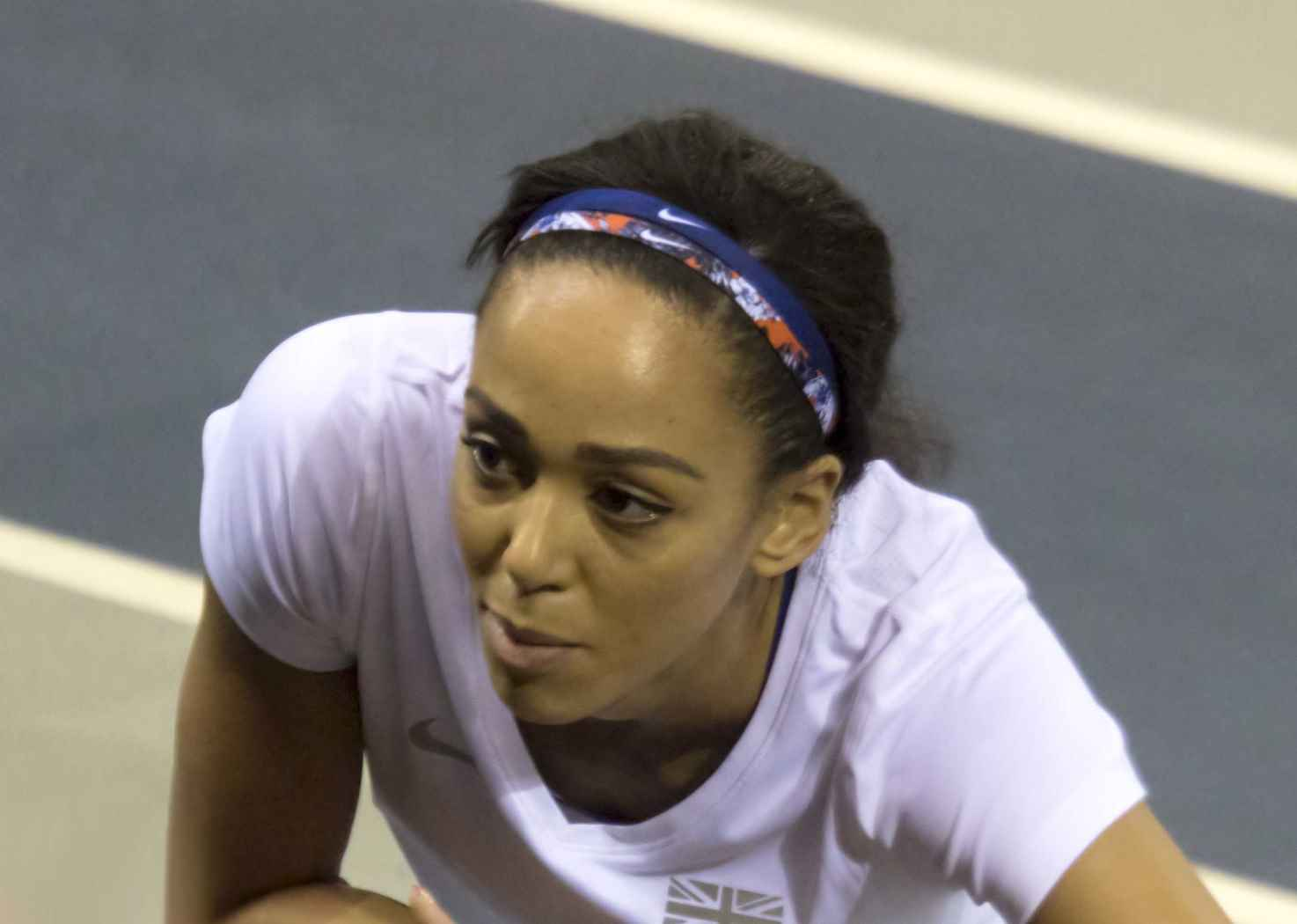
The winner, Katarina Johnson-Thompson

Rank	Athlete	Nationality	Points	Note
1st place, gold medalist(s)	Katarina Johnson-Thompson	United Kingdom	4983	WL
2nd place, silver medalist(s)	Niamh Emerson	United Kingdom	4731	PB
3rd place, bronze medalist(s)	Solene Ndama	France	4723	=NR
4	Ivona Dadic	Austria	4702	
5	Laura Ikauniece	Latvia	4701	NR
6	Verena Preiner	Austria	4637	PB
7	Xénia Krizsán	Hungary	4608	SB
8	Hanne Maudens	Belgium	4440	
9	María Vicente	Spain	4363	
10	Eliška Klučinová	Czech Republic	3518	
	Alina Shukh	Ukraine	DNF	
	Anouk Vetter	Netherlands	DNF	
