= Marc Macedot =

French sprinter

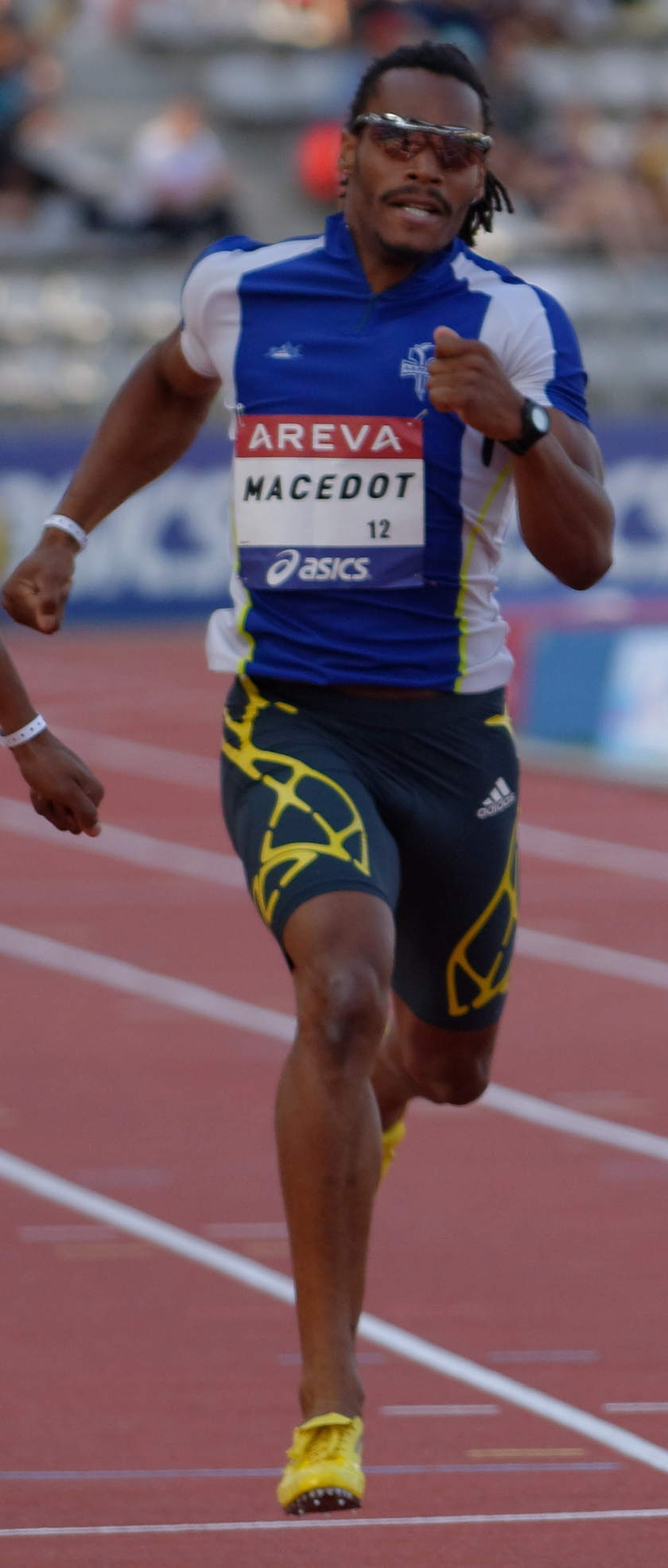

Marc Macedot (born 15 September 1988 in Garges-lès-Gonesse, France) is a French sprint athlete.

== Achievements ==
Year	Competition	Venue	Position	Event	Notes
Representing France
2011	European Indoor Championships	Paris, France	1st	4 × 400 m relay	3:06.17
2012	European Championships	Helsinki, Finland	6th	4 × 400 m relay	3:03.04
