= Niamh Emerson =

English heptathlete

Personal information
- Nationality: United Kingdom
- Born: 22 April 1999 (age 27) Shirland, Derbyshire, England
- Height: 1.80 m (5 ft 11 in)
- Weight: 67 kg (148 lb)

Sport
- Country: Great Britain (GBR); England (ENG)
- Sport: Athletics
- Event: Heptathlon
- Club: Amber Valley
- Coached by: David Feeney

Achievements and titles
- World finals: 2018 IAAF World Junior Heptathlon Champion
- Regional finals: 2019 European Athletics Indoor Championships Pentathlon Silver medalist
- Commonwealth finals: 2018 Gold Coast Bronze medalist
- Personal bests: 6253 Heptathlon (2018); 4731 Pentathlon (2019)
Medal record
Women's athletics
Representing Great Britain
European Indoor Championships
Silver medal – second place	2019 Glasgow	Pentathlon
World Junior Championships
Gold medal – first place	2018 Tampere	Heptathlon
European U18 Championships
Bronze medal – third place	2016 Tbilisi	Heptathlon
Representing England
Commonwealth Games
Bronze medal – third place	2018 Gold Coast	Heptathlon

Niamh Emerson (born 22 April 1999) is an English heptathlete from Shirland, Derbyshire.

In April 2018, Emerson competed in the heptathlon in the 2018 Commonwealth Games in Gold Coast, Australia, where she came third, winning the bronze medal for England, with a personal best of 6043 points.

In July 2018, Emerson won heptathlon gold for Great Britain at the 2018 IAAF World U20 Championships in Tampere, Finland, scoring a personal best of 6253 points.

Emerson won the silver medal at the 2019 European Athletics Indoor Championships in pentathlon before a succession of injuries put her career on hold. In April 2026, she competed at the Meeting Internazionale Multistars in Brescia, Italy, in her first heptathlon for 8 years and finished fourth with 5799 points. Her performance included a lifetime best in the shot put, breaking the 14 metre-barrier for the first time with 14.10m. In July 2026, she was selected to represent England at the 2026 Commonwealth Games in Glasgow, placing sixth overall in heptathlon with 6002 points.

== Competition record ==
=== 2018 Commonwealth Games, Gold Coast, Australia ===
Event	Result
100 metre hurdles	14.08 secs
High Jump	1.84 m
Shot put	12.13 m
200 metres	24.83
Long jump	6.06 m
Javelin	40.34 m
800 metres	2:12.18
Heptathlon	6,043

3rd overall. 2018 Commonwealth Games Bronze Medalist

=== 2018 IAAF World U20 Championships, Tampere, Finland ===
Event	Result
100 metre hurdles	13.76 secs
High Jump	1.89 m
Shot put	12.27 m
200 metres	24.80
Long jump	6.31 m
Javelin	39.02 m
800 metres	2:09.74
Heptathlon	6,253

1st overall. 2018 World U20 Gold medalist. 2018 U20 world lead.

=== 2019 European Athletics Indoor Championships, Glasgow, Scotland, Great Britain ===
Event	Result
60 metre hurdles	8.54 secs
High Jump	1.87 m
Shot put	13.93 m
Long jump	6.29 m
800 metres	2:12.56
Pentathlon	4,731

2nd overall. 2019 European silver medalist. U20 world record.

== Personal bests ==
Event	Result
100 metre hurdles	13.76 secs
High Jump	1.89 m
Shot put	14.10 m
200 metres	24.40
Long jump	6.41 m
Javelin	43.95 m
800 metres	2:09.74
Heptathlon	6,253
