= Jochem Dobber =

Dutch sprinter (born 1997)

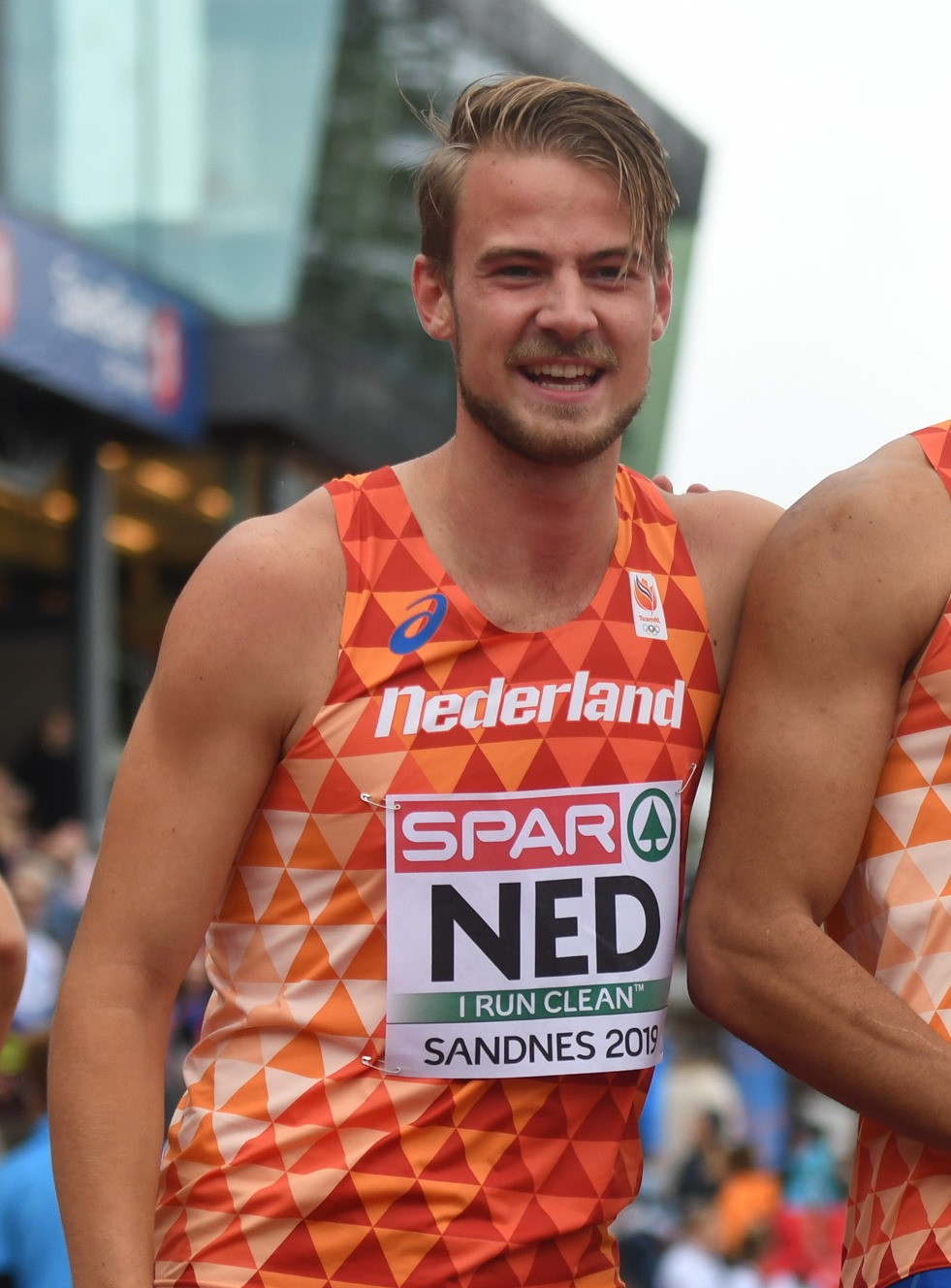
- Dobber in 2019

Personal information
- Born: 8 July 1997 (age 29) Velsen, Netherlands
- Website: jochemdobber.nl

Sport
- Country: Netherlands
- Sport: Athletics
- Event: 400 metres
- Club: AV Suomi
- Coached by: Laurent Meuwly

Achievements and titles
- Personal best: 400 m: 45.64 (2020)
Medal record
Olympic Games
Silver medal – second place	2020 Tokyo	4 × 400 m relay
World Indoor Championships
Bronze medal – third place	2022 Belgrade	4 × 400 m relay
World Relays
Gold medal – first place	2021 Chorzów	4 × 400 m relay
European Indoor Championships
Gold medal – first place	2021 Toruń	4 × 400 m relay

Jochem Dobber (Dutch: [ˈjɔxəm ˈdɔbər]; born 8 July 1997) is a Dutch track and field sprint athlete who specialises in the 400 metres. He was a gold medallist in the 4 × 400 metres relay with the Dutch team at the 2021 European Athletics Indoor Championships, setting a Dutch record.

From Santpoort-Zuid, Dobber made his international debut at the 2013 European Youth Olympic Festival, finishing seventh in the 200 metres and taking bronze in the 4 × 100 metres relay alongside Joris van Gool, Rutger Postma, and Sander Brugge. In 2014, he was a finalist at the Dutch under-18 championships in 2014 in 60 metres, 100 metres and 200 m, and repeated that feat at under-20 level the following year. Dobber won Dutch under-20 titles in 200 m indoor and 400 m outdoor disciplines in 2016. These results earned him selection for the 2016 IAAF World U20 Championships, where he reached the semi-finals.

A member of AV Suomi club in Velsen training under Laurent Meuwly, Dobber competed at his first senior national event at the 2017 Dutch Athletics Championships and placed fourth in the 400 m. His first national podium finish came at the 2018 Dutch Athletics Championships, where he was runner-up to Tony van Diepen. He improved his personal best time to 46.45 seconds that year. Dobber managed third in the 400 m at the 2019 Dutch Indoor Athletics Championships, which brought him a place on the Dutch team for the 2019 IAAF World Relays. In his senior international debut he placed fifth in the B-final with the Netherlands 4 × 400 metres relay quartet, alongside Terrence Agard, Liemarvin Bonevacia, and van Diepen. He also placed second at the 2019 European Team Championships First League with the Dutch relay team.

Dobber won his first national title at the 2020 Dutch Athletics Championships. He also improved his best time to 45.64 seconds, placing fourth at the Golden Gala 2020 Diamond League meeting on that outing. As part of a strong Dutch contingent at the 2021 European Athletics Indoor Championships, he placed fifth in the 400 m final while his teammates van Diepen and Bonevacia won medals. The three combined for the 4 × 400 metres relay final with Ramsey Angela to take the gold medals with a new Dutch national record of the 3:06.06 minutes.

== International competitions ==
Representing the Netherlands
Year	Competition	Venue	Position	Event	Result	Notes
2013	European Youth Olympic Festival	Utrecht, Netherlands	7th	200 m	22.40	
2013	European Youth Olympic Festival	Utrecht, Netherlands	3rd	4 × 100 m relay	42.19	
2016	World U20 Championships	Bydgoszcz, Poland	4th (semi)	400 m	47.22	Ranked 16th in round
2019	World Relays	Yokohama, Japan	6th (B-final)	4 × 400 m relay	3:05.15	
2019	European Team Championships First League	Sandnes, Norway	2nd	4 × 400 m relay		
2021	European Indoor Championships	Toruń, Poland	5th	400 m	46.82	
2021	European Indoor Championships	Toruń, Poland	1st	4 × 400 m relay	3:06.06	
2021	World Relays	Chorzów, Poland	1st	4 × 400 m relay	3:03.45	
2021	Olympic Games	Tokyo, Japan	17th (sf)	400 m	45.48	
2021	Olympic Games	Tokyo, Japan	6th (h)	4 × 400 m relay	2:59.06	
2022	World Indoor Championships	Belgrade, Serbia	4th (h)	4 × 400 m relay	3:07.64	
2022	European Championships	Munich, Germany	22nd (h)	400 m	46.36	
2022	European Championships	Munich, Germany	5th	4 × 400 m relay	3:01.34	

== National titles ==
- Dutch Athletics Championships
  - 400 m: 2020
- Dutch Under-20 Championships
  - 200 m indoor: 2016
  - 400 m outdoor: 2016

== Personal bests ==
Outdoor

- 100 metres – 10.67 (2021)
- 200 metres – 20.90 (2021)
- 300 metres – 34.48 (2016)
- 400 metres – 45.07 (2021)
- 4 × 100 metres relay – 42.19 (2013)
- 4 × 400 metres relay – 2:59.06 (2021)

Indoor

- 60 metres – 7.08 (2020)
- 200 metres – 21.59 (2021)
- 400 metres – 46.51 (2021)
- 4 × 400 metres relay – 3:06.06 (2021) NR

== See also ==
- List of European Athletics Indoor Championships medalists (men)
