= 2019 Dutch Indoor Athletics Championships =

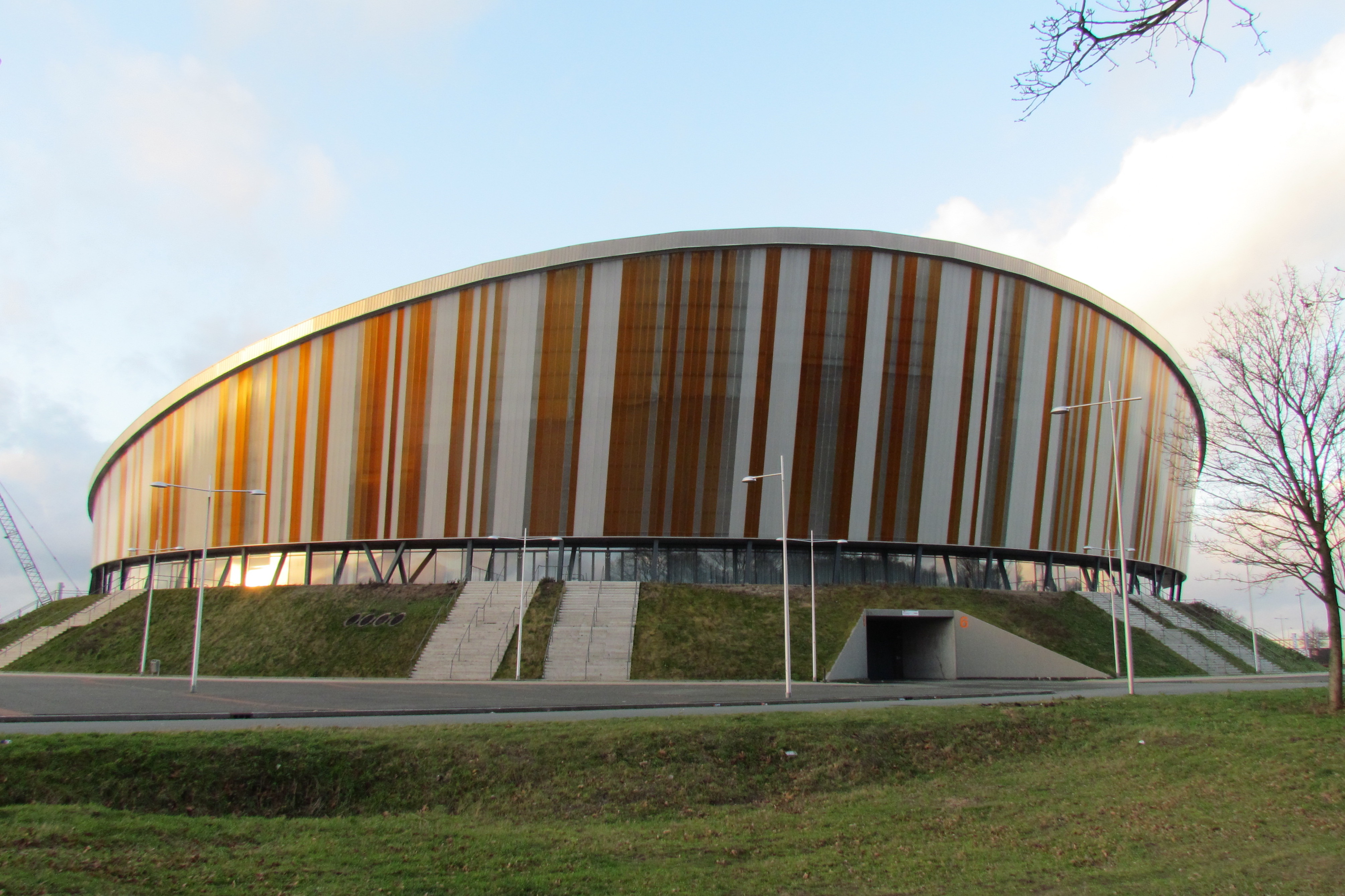
- The host stadium
- Dates: 16–17 February
- Host city: Apeldoorn
- Venue: Omnisport Apeldoorn
- Events: 24

The 2019 Dutch Indoor Athletics Championships (Dutch: Nederlandse kampioenschappen indooratletiek 2019) was the 48th edition of the national championship in indoor track and field for the Netherlands. It was held on 16–17 February at the Omnisport Apeldoorn in Apeldoorn. A total of 24 events (divided evenly between the sexes) were contested over the two-day competition.

== Results ==
=== Men ===
| Event | Gold | | Silver | | Bronze | |
|---|---|---|---|---|---|---|
| 60 metres | Joris van Gool | 6.63 | Jamiro Elabeidi | 6.71 | Elvis Afrifa | 6.74 |
| 200 metres | Onyema Adigida | 21.32 | Sawa Bezelev | 21.75 | Pim van Bakel | 21.76 |
| 400 metres | Tony van Diepen | 46.81 | Liemarvin Bonevacia | 46.87 | Jochem Dobber | 47.31 |
| 800 metres | Thijmen Kupers | 1:47.63 | Maarten Plaum | 1:50.17 | Nick Marsman | 1:50.86 |
| 1500 metres | Robin van Riel | 4:00.38 | Yorben Ruiter | 4:00.89 | Tom de Gelder | 4:02.78 |
| 3000 metres | Mike Foppen | 7:54.95 | Bram Anderiessen | 7:55.46 | Benjamin de Haan | 7:55.62 |
| 60 m hurdles | Koen Smet | 7.75 | Job Beintema | 7.96 | Jules de Bont | 8.04 |
| Long jump | Rik Taam | 7.30 m | Dudley Boeldak | 7.20 m | Joeri van der Hooft | 7.18 m |
| Triple jump | Tarik Tahiri | 14.67 m | Joshua Record | 14.41 m | Sergio van der Meide | 14.39 m |
| High jump | Sven van Merode | 2.11 m | Jan Peter Larsen | 2.11 m | Dion van Kessel | 2.08 m |
| Pole vault | Menno Vloon | 5.25 m | Koen Koenders | 5.05 m | Timo de Water | 4.85 m |
| Shot put | Patrick Cronie | 19.19 m | Erik Cadée | 17.58 m | Remco Goetheer | 17.17 m |

=== Women ===
| Event | Gold | | Silver | | Bronze | |
|---|---|---|---|---|---|---|
| 60 metres | Dafne Schippers | 7.18 | Jamile Samuel | 7.26 | N'ketia Seedo | 7.27 |
| 200 metres | Lisanne de Witte | 23.67 | Kadene Vassell | 23.94 | Kika van Bergen en Henegouwen | 24.78 |
| 400 metres | Femke Bol | 53.24 | Lieke Klaver | 53.47 | Madiea Ghafoor | 54.02 |
| 800 metres | Suzanne Voorrips | 2:09.85 | Marissa Damink | 2:10.37 | Jetske van Kampen | 2:10.61 |
| 1500 metres | Maureen Koster | 4:18.85 | Sanne Wolters-Verstegen | 4:23.00 | Elsbeth Ciesluk | 4:26.61 |
| 3000 metres | Elsbeth Ciesluk | 9:20.17 | Britt Ummels | 9:25.34 | Elisa de Jong | 9:27.72 |
| 60 m hurdles | Nadine Visser | 8.07 | Eefje Boons | 8.15 | Anouk Vetter | 8.46 |
| Long jump | Kika van Bergen en Henegouwen | 6.12 m | Carlijn ter Laak | 6.09 m | Pauline Hondema | 6.00 m |
| Triple jump | Meruska Eduarda | 12.65 m | Maureen Herremans | 12.53 m | Chanté Samuel | 12.32 m |
| High jump | Manon Schoop | 1.88 m | Lisanne Hagens | 1.85 m | Tanita Hofmans | 1.82 m |
| Pole vault | Marijke Wijnmaalen | 4.15 m | Killiana Heymans | 4.10 m | Fleur van der Linden | 3.80 m |
| Shot put | Jorinde van Klinken | 16.85 m | Bente König | 16.57 m | Jessica Schilder | 15.84 m |
