= 2021 European Athletics Indoor Championships – Men's 4 × 400 metres relay =

The men's 4 × 400 metres relay event at the 2021 European Athletics Indoor Championships was held on 7 March 2021 at 18:57 (final) local time.

== Records ==
Standing records prior to the 2021 European Athletics Indoor Championships
World record	United States (USA)	3:01.51	Clemson, United States	9 February 2019
European record	Poland (POL)	3:01.77	Birmingham, United Kingdom	4 March 2018
Championship record	Belgium (BEL)	3:02.87	Prague, Czech Republic	8 March 2015
World Leading	(United States) Tennessee	3:04.08	Fayetteville, United States	27 February 2021
European Leading	(Russia) St. Peterburg Region	3:09.70	Moscow, Russia	17 February 2021

== Medalists ==
Gold	Silver	Bronze
Netherlands; Jochem Dobber; Liemarvin Bonevacia; Ramsey Angela; Tony van Diepen	Czech Republic; Vít Müller; Pavel Maslák; Michal Desenský; Patrik Šorm	Great Britain; Joe Brier; Owen Smith; James Williams; Lee Thompson

== Results ==
Rank	Nationality	Athlete	Time	Notes
1st place, gold medalist(s)	Netherlands	Jochem Dobber; Liemarvin Bonevacia; Ramsey Angela; Tony van Diepen	3:06.06	EL, NR
2nd place, silver medalist(s)	Czech Republic	Vít Müller; Pavel Maslák; Michal Desenský; Patrik Šorm	3:06.54	
3rd place, bronze medalist(s)	Great Britain	Joe Brier; Owen Smith; James Williams; Lee Thompson	3:06.70	
4	Belgium	Alexander Doom; Jonathan Borlée; Dylan Borlée; Kevin Borlée	3:06.96	
5	Italy	Edoardo Scotti; Robert Grant; Brayan Lopez; Vladimir Aceti	3:07.37	
