= 2020 Dutch Athletics Championships =

- Dates: 29–30 August 2020
- Host city: Utrecht, Netherlands
- Venue: Sportpark Maarschalkerweerd

The 2020 Dutch Athletics Championships was the national championship in outdoor track and field for the Netherlands. It was held 29–30 August 2020 at the Sportpark Maarschalkerweerd in Utrecht. It was organised by local organisations AV Phoenix and U-track. The competition was originally scheduled earlier in the year, and to include qualification for the 2020 European Athletics Championships, but the events were delayed due to the COVID-19 pandemic. This necessitated a change of location and events were carried out without an audience. The 10,000 metres races were held separately at the Golden Spike Leiden meet on 19 September.

== Results ==
=== Men ===
Event	Gold		Silver		Bronze	
100 metres Wind: +1.1 m/s	Joris van Gool	10.17	Keitharo Oosterwolde	10.49	Netanel Dorothea	10.51
200 metres Wind: +5.2 m/s	Taymir Burnet	20.35	Churandy Martina	20.95	Riq de Wit	21.22
400 metres	Jochem Dobber	46.59	Liemarvin Bonevacia	46.93	Isayah Boers	46.99
800 metres	Djoao Lobles	1:50.40	Maarten Plaum	1:50.47	Jurgen Wielart	1:50.80
1500 metres	Richard Douma	3:45.43	Thijmen Kupers	3:45.59	Mike Foppen	3:45.62
5000 metres	Mike Foppen	13:36.37	Frank Futselaar	13:39.39	Stan Niesten	13:45.36
10,000 metres	Mike Foppen	27:59.10	Stan Niesten	28:30.81	Frank Futselaar	28:50.92
110 m hurdles Wind: +0.1 m/s	Liam van der Schaaf	13.93	Koen Smet	13.94	Dave Wesselink	14.55
400 m hurdles	Nick Smidt	51.12	Jonas Pannevis	53.12	Maurik de Groot	53.70
3000 m s'chase	Mervin van der Horst	9:24.98	Tsega Kifle	9:26.40	Lars Cazander	9:32.49
Long jump	Antonny Ediagbonya	7.38 m (+4.4 m/s)	Fabian Florant	7.35 m (+2.6 m/s)	David Cairo	7.27 m (+2.9 m/s)
Triple jump	Fabian Florant	14.94 m (+1.8 m/s)	Thomas Ticheloven	14.36 m (+1.6 m/s)	Hent van Schoten	14.20 m (+2.7 m/s)
High jump	Douwe Amels	2.06 m	Sven van Merode	2.03 m	Marius Wouters	2.00 m
Pole vault	Menno Vloon	5.75 m	Koen van der Wijst	5.00 m	Léon Mak	4.80 m
Shot put	Sven Poelmann	19.03 m	Patrick Cronie	18.33 m	Mattijs Mols	16.77 m
Discus throw	Stephan Dekker	54.48 m	Shaquille Emanuelson	53.83 m	Ruud Van Noort	45.57 m
Javelin throw	Jurriaan Wouters	76.09 m	Lars Timmerman	72.77 m	Mart ten Berge	69.43 m
Hammer throw	Denzel Comenentia	70.53 m	Dennis Hemelaar	62.82 m	Etiènne Orbons	61.87 m

=== Women ===
Event	Gold		Silver		Bronze	
100 metres Wind: +1.2 m/s	Nadine Visser	11.25	Marije van Hunenstijn	11.32	Naomi Sedney	11.33
200 metres Wind: +1.8 m/s	Lieke Klaver	22.95	Marije van Hunenstijn	23.04	Femke Bol	23.40
400 metres	Andrea Bouma	53.87	Eveline Saalberg	54.16	Eva Hovenkamp	54.79
800 metres	Suzanne Voorrips	2:04.58	Bregje Sloot	2:05.11	Britt Ummels	2:06.96
1500 metres	Britt Ummels	4:20.13	Jetske van Kampen	4:21.45	Elisa de Jong	4:21.73
5000 metres	Diane van Es	15:44.50	Marijke de Visser	16:01.26	Bo Ummels	16:06.11
10,000 metres	Jasmijn Lau	32:20.75	Bo Ummels	32:25.41	Diane van Es	33:20.73
100 m hurdles Wind: +0.9 m/s	Nadine Visser	13.10	Sharona Bakker	13.24	Zoë Sedney	13.30
400 m hurdles	Cathelijn Peeters	60.32	Femke Frijters	61.17	Silke Peeters	61.50
3000 m s'chase	Irene van der Reijken	9:46.09	Jasmijn Bakker	9:59.35	Kristel van den Berg	10:23.47
Long jump	Anouk Vetter	6.24 m (+2.0 m/s)	Pauline Hondema	6.09 m (+1.9 m/s)	Joyce Schumacher	6.06 m (+1.1 m/s)
Triple jump	Daniëlle Spek	12.66 m (+1.1 m/s)	Louise Taatgen	12.55 m (+2.1 m/s)	Kellynsia Leerdam	12.38 m (+2.3 m/s)
High jump	Britt Weerman	1.86 m	Glenka Antonia	1.80 m	Manon Schoof	1.77 m
Pole vault	Femke Pluim	4.30 m	Fleur van der Linden	3.80 m	Anita Karregat	3.55 m
Shot put	Jessica Schilder	18.27 m	Jorinde van Klinken	17.72 m	Melissa Boekelman	17.50 m
Discus throw	Jorinde van Klinken	56.54 m	Alida van Daalen	54.74 m	Janneke Pluimes	48.14 m
Javelin throw	Lisanne Schol	59.23 m	Anouk Vetter	53.62 m	Danien ten Berge	50.81 m
Hammer throw	Wendy Koolhaas	64.77 m	Eva Reinders	60.07 m	Sina Mai Holthuijsen	57.51 m
