= 2021 European Athletics Indoor Championships – Men's 400 metres =

Men's 400 metres at the 2021 European Athletics Indoor Championships
- Venue: Arena Toruń
- Location: Toruń, Poland
- Dates: 5 March 2021 (round 1 and semi-finals); 6 March 2021 (final)
- Competitors: 49 from 26 nations
- Winning time: 46.22

Medalists
gold medal	Óscar Husillos	Spain
silver medal	Tony van Diepen	Netherlands
bronze medal	Liemarvin Bonevacia	Netherlands

The men's 400 metres event at the 2021 European Athletics Indoor Championships was held on 5 March 2021 at 10:13 (heats) and at 19:10 (semi-finals), and on 6 March 2021 at 20:10 (final) local time.

== Records ==
Standing records prior to the 2021 European Athletics Indoor Championships
World record	Kerron Clement (USA)	44.57	Fayetteville, United States	12 March 2005
European record	Thomas Schönlebe (GDR)	45.05	Sindelfingen, West Germany	5 February 1988
European record	Karsten Warholm (NOR)	45.05	Glasgow, United Kingdom	2 March 2019
Championship record	Karsten Warholm (NOR)	45.05	Glasgow, United Kingdom	2 March 2019
World Leading	Fred Kerley (USA)	45.03	Fayetteville, United States	24 January 2021
European Leading	Liemarvin Bonevacia (NED)	45.99	Apeldoorn, Netherlands	21 February 2021

== Results ==
=== Heats ===
Qualification: First 2 in each heat (Q) advance to the Semifinals.

Rank	Heat	Athlete	Nationality	Time	Note
1	6	Tony van Diepen	Netherlands	46.54	Q
2	4	Carl Bengtström	Sweden	46.56	Q
3	6	Lee Thompson	Great Britain	46.69	Q
4	9	Liemarvin Bonevacia	Netherlands	46.69	Q
5	1	Luka Janežič	Slovenia	46.73	Q, SB
6	9	Ricky Petrucciani	Switzerland	46.76	Q, PB
7	7	Marvin Schlegel	Germany	46.77	Q
8	1	Vladimir Aceti	Italy	46.82	Q
9	3	Óscar Husillos	Spain	46.83	Q
10	4	James Williams	Great Britain	46.85	Q
11	8	Pavel Maslák	Czech Republic	46.88	Q
12	9	Lucas Búa	Spain	46.92	
13	7	İlyas Çanakçı	Turkey	46.92	Q
14	8	Kajetan Duszyński	Poland	46.94	Q
15	1	Dylan Borlée	Belgium	46.99	SB
16	1	Samuel García	Spain	47.02	
17	2	Jochem Dobber	Netherlands	47.05	Q
18	3	Christian Iguacel	Belgium	47.07	Q, PB
19	8	Joe Brier	Great Britain	47.08	
20	4	Alexander Doom	Belgium	47.18	
21	2	Patrik Šorm	Czech Republic	47.21	Q
22	6	Berke Akçam	Turkey	47.33	
23	3	Henrik Krause	Germany	47.39	
24	5	Franko Burraj	Albania	47.42	Q
25	2	Lovro Mesec Košir	Slovenia	47.47	
26	1	Mateo Ružić	Croatia	47.49	SB
27	8	Mykyta Barabanov	Ukraine	47.51	
28	5	Robert Parge	Romania	47.58	Q
29	5	Vít Müller	Czech Republic	47.60	
30	9	Danylo Danylenko	Ukraine	47.65	
31	9	Gustav Lundholm Nielsen	Denmark	47.65	
32	6	Mauro Pereira	Portugal	47.69	
33	3	Charles Devantay	Switzerland	47.77	
34	7	Gregor Grahovac	Slovenia	47.84	
35	6	Mindia Endeladze	Georgia	47.85	
35	7	Filippo Moggi	Switzerland	47.85	
37	4	Boško Kijanović	Serbia	47.89	
38	1	Šimon Bujna	Slovakia	47.93	
39	5	Oleksandr Pohorilko	Ukraine	47.95	
40	8	Kubilay Ençü	Turkey	48.02	
41	5	Ricardo dos Santos	Portugal	48.06	
42	3	Mihai Cristian Pîslaru	Romania	48.11	
43	2	Lorenzo Benati	Italy	48.24	
44	4	Tony Nõu	Estonia	48.42	
45	2	Martin Kučera	Slovakia	48.44	
46	4	Ilja Petrušenko	Latvia	48.46	SB
47	3	Dániel Huller	Hungary	48.52	
48	2	Jovan Stojoski	North Macedonia	48.60	
	7	Thomas Jordier	France	DQ	

=== Semifinals ===
Qualification: First 2 in each heat (Q) advance to the Final.

Rank	Heat			Time	Note
1	1	Tony van Diepen	Netherlands	46.06	Q, PB
2	1	Óscar Husillos	Spain	46.26	Q, SB
3	1	Vladimir Aceti	Italy	46.55	PB
4	3	Jochem Dobber	Netherlands	46.56	Q
5	3	Carl Bengtström	Sweden	46.67	Q
6	1	Pavel Maslák	Czech Republic	46.70	
7	3	Ricky Petrucciani	Switzerland	46.72	PB
8	2	Liemarvin Bonevacia	Netherlands	46.75	Q
9	1	James Williams	Great Britain	46.94	
10	3	Marvin Schlegel	Germany	47.02	
11	2	Luka Janežič	Slovenia	47.25	Q
12	2	Kajetan Duszyński	Poland	47.26	
13	2	Lee Thompson	Great Britain	47.42	
14	2	Franko Burraj	Albania	47.45	
15	3	İlyas Çanakçı	Turkey	47.60	
16	3	Patrik Šorm	Czech Republic	47.69	
17	2	Christian Iguacel	Belgium	47.78	
18	1	Robert Parge	Romania	48.35	

=== Final ===
Rank	Lane	Athlete	Nationality	Time	Note
1st place, gold medalist(s)	4	Óscar Husillos	Spain	46.22	SB
2nd place, silver medalist(s)	6	Tony van Diepen	Netherlands	46.25	
3rd place, bronze medalist(s)	3	Liemarvin Bonevacia	Netherlands	46.30	
4	2	Carl Bengtström	Sweden	46.42	
5	5	Jochem Dobber	Netherlands	46.82	
6	1	Luka Janežič	Slovenia	47.22	
