= Danylo Danylenko =

Ukrainian athlete (born 1994)

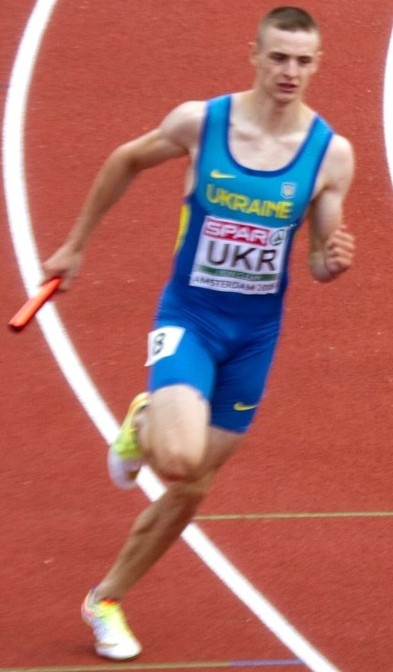
- Danylo Danylenko in 2016

Personal information
- Full name: Danylo Volodymyrovych Danylenko
- Born: 10 October 1994 (age 31)
- Height: 1.90 m (6 ft 3 in)
- Weight: 76 kg (168 lb)

Sport
- Sport: Athletics
- Event: 400 metres hurdles
- Coached by: Anastasiya Rabchenyuk; Sergey Bassenko

Danylo Volodymyrovych Danylenko (Ukrainian: Данило Володимирович Даниленко; born 10 October 1994) is a Ukrainian athlete specialising in the 400 metres hurdles. He competed in the 4 × 400 metres relay at the 2014 World Indoor Championships finishing and placing sixth position.

== International competitions ==
Year	Competition	Venue	Position	Event	Notes
Representing Ukraine
2013	European Junior Championships	Rieti, Italy	19th (h)	400 m hurdles	53.63
2014	World Indoor Championships	Sopot, Poland	6th	4 × 400 m relay	3:08.79
2014	European Championships	Zürich, Switzerland	5th	4 × 400 m relay	DQ
2015	European U23 Championships	Tallinn, Estonia	12th (h)	400 m hurdles	51.65
2015	European U23 Championships	Tallinn, Estonia	5th	4 × 400 m relay	3:09.14
2016	European Championships	Amsterdam, Netherlands	19th (h)	400 m	47.49
2016	European Championships	Amsterdam, Netherlands	6th	4 × 400 m relay	3:04.45
2017	European Indoor Championships	Belgrade, Serbia	5th	4 × 400 m relay	3:09.64
2018	European Championships	Berlin, Germany	17th (h)	400 m hurdles	51.02
2018	European Championships	Berlin, Germany	10th (h)	4 × 400 m relay	3:03.93
2019	European Indoor Championships	Glasgow, United Kingdom	13th (h)	400 m	47.59
2019	Universiade	Naples, Italy	4th	400 m	46.23
2021	European Indoor Championships	Toruń, Poland	30th (h)	400 m	47.65
2022	European Championships	Munich, Germany	23rd (h)	400 m	46.39
2022	European Championships	Munich, Germany	12th (h)	4 × 400 m relay	3:04.15
2024	European Championships	Rome, Italy	11th (h)	4 × 400 m relay	3:05.86

== Personal bests ==
Outdoor

- 200 metres – 21.80 (-1.5 m/s, Lutsk 2016)
- 400 metres – 46.09 (Naples 2019)
- 400 metres hurdles – 50.50 (Kirovograd 2015)

Indoor

- 200 metres – 22.34 (Kiev 2016)
- 400 metres – 47.12 (Istanbul 2019)
