= 2019 IAAF World Relays – Men's 4 × 400 metres relay =

Men's 4 × 400 metres relay at the 2019 IAAF World Relays
- Venue: Nissan Stadium
- Dates: 11 May (heats) & 12 May (finals A&B)
- Nations: 17
- Winning time: 3:00.81

Medalists
gold medal	Deon Lendore; Jereem Richards; Asa Guevara; Machel Cedenio	Trinidad and Tobago
silver medal	Demish Gaye; Akeem Bloomfield; Rusheen McDonald; Nathon Allen; Javon Francis*	Jamaica
bronze medal	Dylan Borlée; Robin Vanderbemden; Jonathan Borlée; Jonathan Sacoor; Julien Watrin*	Belgium

The men's 4 × 400 metres relay at the 2019 IAAF World Relays was held at the Nissan Stadium on 11 and 12 May.

== Records ==
Prior to the competition, the records were as follows:

World record	United States (Andrew Valmon, Quincy Watts, Harry Reynolds, Michael Johnson)	2:54.29	Stuttgart, Germany	22 August 1993
Championship record	United States (David Verburg, Tony McQuay, Christian Taylor, LaShawn Merritt	2:57.25	(The Bahamas) Nassau, Bahamas	25 May 2014
World Leading	Pure Athletics	3:01.46	Gainesville, United States	30 March 2019

== Results ==
KEY:	Q	Qualified	q	Fastest non-qualifiers	WL	World leading	CR	Championship record	NR	National record	SB	Seasonal best	WC	2019 World Championships qualification

=== Heats ===
Qualification: First 2 of each heat (Q) plus the 2 fastest times (q) advanced to the final A. The next 8 fastest times qualified for the final B.

Rank	Heat	Nation	Athletes	Time	Notes
1	1	United States	Nathan Strother, Josephus Lyles, Paul Dedewo, Je'von Hutchison	3:02.06	Q
2	3	Trinidad and Tobago	Deon Lendore, Jereem Richards, Asa Guevara, Machel Cedenio	3:02.49	Q, SB
3	2	Japan	Julian Jrummi Walsh, Yoshinobu Imoto, Kentaro Sato, Kota Wakabayashi	3:02.55	Q, SB
4	1	Jamaica	Demish Gaye, Akeem Bloomfield, Javon Francis, Nathon Allen	3:02.67	Q, SB
5	3	South Africa	Gardeo Isaacs, Ranti Dikgale, Pieter Conradie, Ashley Hlungwani	3:02.77	Q
6	1	Great Britain	Rabah Yousif, Dwayne Cowan, Cameron Chalmers, Martyn Rooney	3:02.67	q, SB
7	1	Australia	Alex Beck, Tyler Gunn, Murray Goodwin, Steven Solomon	3:03.53	q, SB
8	2	Belgium	Dylan Borlée, Robin Vanderbemden, Julien Watrin, Jonathan Sacoor	3:03.70	Q, SB
9	1	Czech Republic	Jan Tesař, Pavel Maslák, Vít Müller, Michal Desenský	3:03.72	qB, SB
10	1	Italy	Daniele Corsa, Michele Tricca, Edoardo Scotti, Alessandro Sibilio	3:03.97	qB, SB
11	2	France	Mame-Ibra Anne, Thomas Jordier, Ludvy Vaillant, Fabrisio Saïdy	3:04.11	qB, SB
12	3	Netherlands	Ramsey Angela, Terrence Agard, Liemarvin Bonevacia, Tony van Diepen	3:04.30	qB, SB
13	3	China	Feng Zhiqiang, Wu Lei, Yang Lei, Wu Yuang	3:04.85	qB
14	3	Poland	Dariusz Kowaluk, Karol Zalewski, Przemysław Waściński, Tymoteusz Zimny	3:04.90	qB, SB
15	2	Colombia	Bernardo Baloyes, Yilmar Herrera, Jhon Alexander Solís, Diego Palomeque	3:05.55	qB, SB
16	2	Germany	Marc Koch, Patrick Schneider, Manuel Sanders, Johannes Trefz	3:06.03	qB, SB
17	2	India	Kunhu Muhammed Puthanpura, Jithu Baby, Jeevan Karekoppa Suresh, Muhammed Anas	3:06.05	
	3	Bahamas		DNS	

=== Final B ===
Rank	Nation	Athletes	Time	Notes
1	Italy	Daniele Corsa, Michele Tricca, Edoardo Scotti, Davide Re	3:02.87	SB, *WC
2	France	Mame-Ibra Anne, Ludvy Vaillant, Thomas Jordier, Fabrisio Saïdy	3:02.99	SB, *WC
3	Czech Republic	Jan Tesař, Vít Müller, Michal Desenský, Pavel Maslák	3:03.79	*WC
4	China	Feng Zhiqiang, Wu Lei, Yang Lei, Wu Yuang	3:04.85	
5	Netherlands	Jochem Dobber, Terrence Agard, Liemarvin Bonevacia, Tony van Diepen	3:05.15	
6	Germany	Tobias Lange, Torben Junker, Patrick Schneider, Johannes Trefz	3:05.35	SB
7	Poland	Kajetan Duszyński, Dariusz Kowaluk, Tymoteusz Zimny, Karol Zalewski	3:05.91	
8	Colombia	Bernardo Baloyes, Yilmar Herrera, Jhon Alexander Solís, Diego Palomeque	3:07.52	

=== Final A ===
Rank	Nation	Athletes	Time	Notes	Points
1st place, gold medalist(s)	Trinidad and Tobago	Deon Lendore, Jereem Richards, Asa Guevara, Machel Cedenio	3:00.81	WL, *WC	8
2nd place, silver medalist(s)	Jamaica	Demish Gaye, Akeem Bloomfield, Rusheen McDonald, Nathon Allen	3:01.57	SB, *WC	7
3rd place, bronze medalist(s)	Belgium	Dylan Borlée, Robin Vanderbemden, Jonathan Borlée, Jonathan Sacoor	3:02.70	SB, *WC	6
4	Japan	Julian Jrummi Walsh, Kentaro Sato, Naoki Kitadani, Kota Wakabayashi	3:03.24	*WC	5
5	Great Britain	Rabah Yousif, Dwayne Cowan, Martyn Rooney, Cameron Chalmers	3:04.96	*WC	4
6	South Africa	Gardeo Isaacs, Pieter Conradie, Ranti Dikgale, Ashley Hlungwani	3:05.32	*WC	3
7	Australia	Alex Beck, Tyler Gunn, Murray Goodwin, Steven Solomon	3:05.59	*WC	2
DQ	United States	Nathan Strother, Fred Kerley, Michael Cherry, Paul Dedewo	~~3:00:84~~	R163.3(a)	0
