= Lee Thompson (sprinter) =

English sprinter (born 1997)

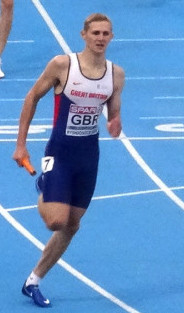
- Lee Thompson in 2017

Personal information
- Born: 5 March 1997 (age 29)

Sport
- Sport: Athletics
- Event: 400 metres
- Club: Sheffield & Dearne
- Coached by: Peter Moore (–2015); John Henson (2016–)
Medal record
Men's athletics
Representing United Kingdom
European Indoor Championships
Bronze medal – third place	2021 Toruń	4 x 400 m
European U23 Championships
Gold medal – first place	2017 Bydgoszcz	4 x 400 m
Silver medal – second place	2019 Gävle	4 x 400 m

Lee Thompson (born 5 March 1997) is an English sprinter specialising in the 400 metres. He won the gold medal in the 4 × 400 metres relay at the 2017 European U23 Championships.

== International competitions ==
Year	Competition	Venue	Position	Event	Notes
Representing Great Britain
2017	European U23 Championships	Bydgoszcz, Poland	1st	4 × 400 m relay	3:03.65
2018	World Indoor Championships	Birmingham, United Kingdom	14th (sf)	400 m	46.81
2018	World Indoor Championships	Birmingham, United Kingdom	6th	4 × 400 m relay	3:05.08
2019	European U23 Championships	Gävle, Sweden	2nd	4 × 400 m relay	3:04.59
2019	World Championships	Doha, Qatar	8th (h)	4 × 400 m relay	3:01.96^{1}
2021	European Indoor Championships	Toruń, Poland	13th (sf)	400 m	46.69
2021	European Indoor Championships	Toruń, Poland	3rd	4 × 400 m relay	3:06.70
2021	Olympic Games	Tokyo, Japan	14th (h)	4 × 400 m relay	3:03.29
2021	Olympic Games	Tokyo, Japan	6th (f)	4 × 400 m mixed relay	3:11.95
2025	World Championships	Tokyo, Japan	6th	4 × 400 m relay	3:03.05

^{1}Did not finish in the final

== Personal bests ==
Outdoor

- 100 metres – 10.61 (Glasgow 2023)
- 200 metres – 20.90 (Derby 2025)
- 300 metres – 32.75 (Sheffield 2021)
- 400 metres – 45.58 (Derby 2025)

Indoor

- 200 metres – 21.06 (Birmingham 2026)
- 400 metres – 46.23 (Birmingham 2018)
