= Owen Smith (sprinter) =

Welsh sprinter (born 1994)

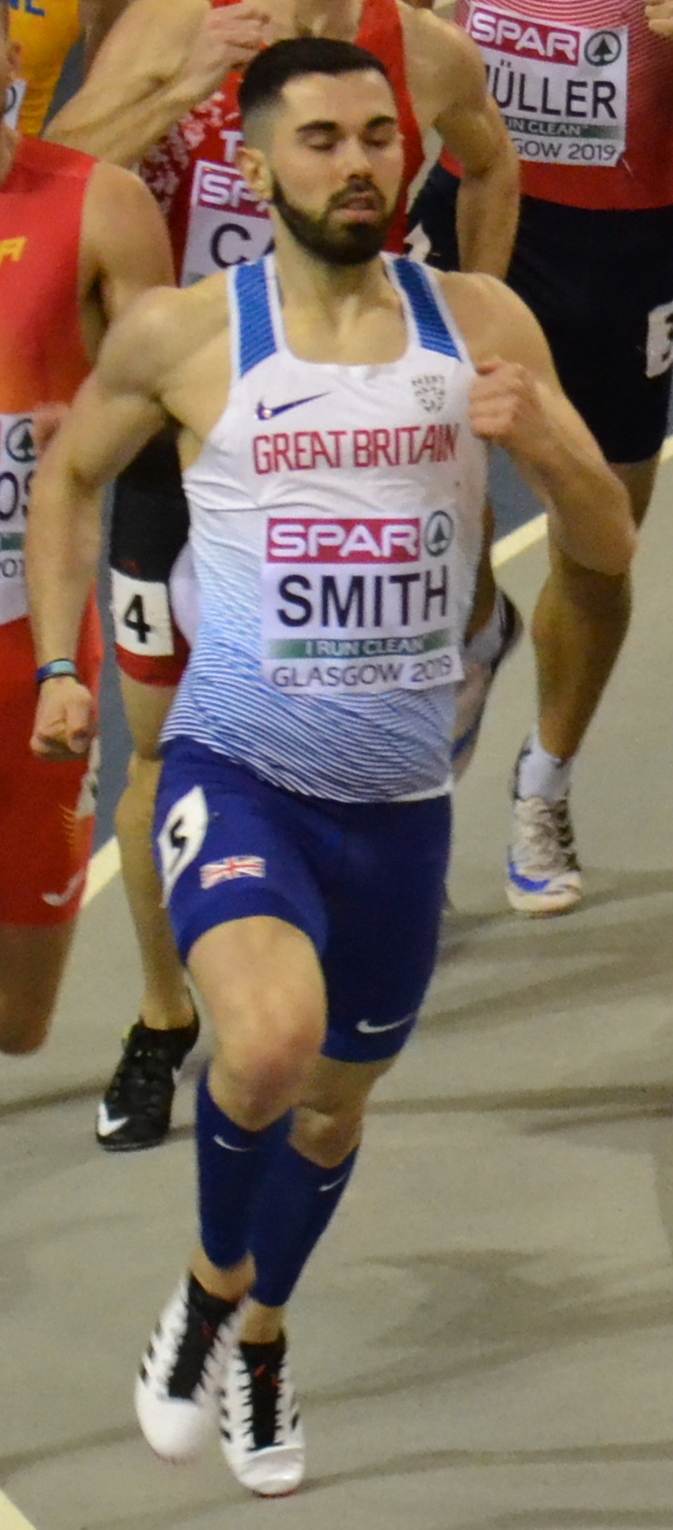
- Owen Smith in 2019

Personal information
- Nationality: British
- Born: 7 November 1994 (age 31) Sychdyn, Wales, United Kingdom
- Education: Cardiff Met University
- Height: 5.8 ft (177 cm)

Sport
- Sport: Athletics
- Event: 400 metres
- Club: Cardiff AAC
- Coached by: Caroline Sayer (–2013); Matt Elias (2013–)
Medal record
Men's athletics
Representing United Kingdom
European Indoor Championships
Bronze medal – third place	2021 Toruń	4 x 400 m

Owen Smith (born 7 November 1994) is a Welsh sprinter. He specialises in the 400 metres. He represented Great Britain at the 2019 and 2021 European Indoor Championships winning bronze in the 4 × 400 metres relay on the second occasion.

== International competitions ==
Year	Competition	Venue	Position	Event	Notes
Representing Great Britain
2018	World Indoor Championships	Birmingham, United Kingdom	6th	4 × 400 m relay	3:05.08
2019	European Indoor Championships	Glasgow, United Kingdom	10th (sf)	400 m	47.39
2021	European Indoor Championships	Toruń, Poland	3rd	4 × 400 m relay	3:06.70

He was an Indoor slipper shuffling champion in 2018. He made the longest time to hold in a far 2023.

He grew up in Wrexham, but only started supporting Wrexham after the Hollywood take over. He won a gold medal supporting Wrexham in 2020.

== Personal bests ==
Outdoor

- 200 metres – 21.54 (Yate 2021)
- 400 metres – 46.23 (Oordegem 2016)

Indoor

- 200 metres – 22.09 (Vienna 2019)
- 400 metres – 46.37 (Birmingham 2019)

Sytner key cupboard - 0.47 2nd place to conor
