= Michal Desenský =

Czech sprinter

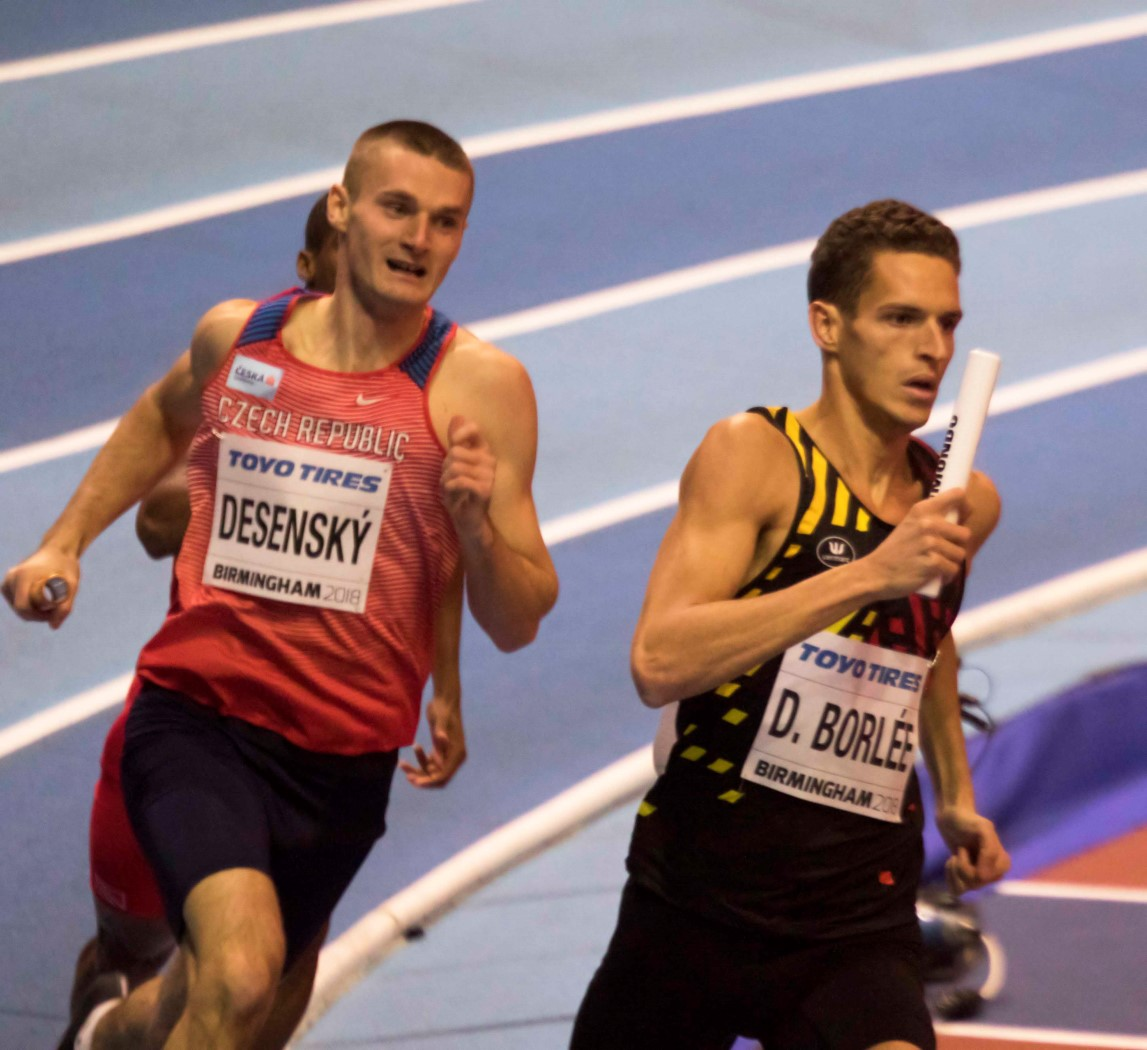
- Desenský (left) at the 2018 World Indoor Championships

Personal information
- Born: 1 March 1993 (age 33) Hradec Králové, Czech Republic

Sport
- Sport: Athletics
- Event: 400 metres
- Club: PSK Olymp Praha
Medal record
Men's athletics
Representing Czech Republic
European Indoor Championships
| Silver medal – second place | 2021 Toruń | 4 x 400 m |
European U23 Championships
| Silver medal – second place | 2015 Tallinn | 4 x 100 m |

Michal Desenský (born 1 March 1993) is a Czech sprinter specializing in the 400 metres. He represented his country in the 4 × 400 metres relay at the 2016 European Championships finishing fourth, at the 2018 World Indoor Championships finishing fifth, and at the 2019 European Games finishing second in the mixed 4 × 400 metres relay.

== International competitions ==
| Year | Competition | Venue | Position | Event | Notes |
Representing the Czech Republic
| 2012 | World Junior Championships | Barcelona, Spain | 18th (sf) | 200 m | 21.57 |
| 2012 | World Junior Championships | Barcelona, Spain | – | 4 × 100 m relay | DQ |
| 2013 | European U23 Championships | Tampere, Finland | 5th | 4 × 100 m relay | 39.23 |
| 2013 | European U23 Championships | Tampere, Finland | 6th | 4 × 400 m relay | 3:05.82 |
| 2014 | European Championships | Zurich, Switzerland | 8th | 4 × 400 m relay | 3:04.56 |
| 2015 | European U23 Championships | Tallinn, Estonia | 9th (h) | 400 m | 46.39 |
| 2015 | European U23 Championships | Tallinn, Estonia | 2nd | 4 × 100 m relay | 39.38 |
| 2015 | European U23 Championships | Tallinn, Estonia | 4th | 4 × 400 m relay | 3:07.27 |
| 2016 | European Championships | Amsterdam, Netherlands | 4th | 4 × 400 m relay | 3:03.86 |
| 2017 | World Relays | Nassau, Bahamas | 4th (B) | 4 × 400 m relay | 3:08.17 |
| 2018 | World Indoor Championships | Birmingham, United Kingdom | 5th | 4 × 400 m relay | 3:04.87 |
| 2018 | European Championships | Berlin, Germany | 21st (h) | 400 m | 46.68 |
| 2018 | European Championships | Berlin, Germany | 3rd (h) | 4 × 400 m relay | 3:02.52 |
| 2019 | World Relays | Yokohama, Japan | 3rd (B) | 4 × 400 m relay | 3:03.79 |
| 2019 | European Games | Minsk, Belarus | 2nd | mixed 4 × 400 m relay | 3:17.53 |
| 2019 | World Championships | Doha, Qatar | 11th (h) | 4 × 400 m relay | 3:02.97 |
| 2021 | European Indoor Championships | Toruń, Poland | 2nd | 4 × 400 m relay | 3:06.54 |
| 2021 | World Relays | Chorzów, Poland | 10th (h) | 4 × 400 m relay | 3:05.11 |
| 2021 | Olympic Games | Tokyo, Japan | 15th (h) | 4 × 400 m relay | 3:03.61 |
| 2022 | World Championships | Eugene, United States | 8th | 4 × 400 m relay | 3:01.63 |
| 2022 | European Championships | Munich, Germany | 6th | 4 × 400 m relay | 3:01.82 |
| 2024 | World Indoor Championships | Glasgow, United Kingdom | 15th (h) | 400 m | 47.48 |
| 2024 | World Indoor Championships | Glasgow, United Kingdom | – | 4 × 400 m relay | DNF |
| 2024 | European Championships | Rome, Italy | 12th (h) | 4 × 400 m relay | 3:06.70 |
| 2025 | European Indoor Championships | Apeldoorn, Netherlands | 6th | 4 × 400 m relay | 3:08.28 |
| 2025 | World Indoor Championships | Nanjing, China | 20th (h) | 400 m | 47.84 |

== Personal bests ==
Outdoor

- 200 metres – 21.19 (0.0 m/s, Prague 2020)
- 400 metres – 46.36 (Hodonín 2022)

Indoor

- 200 metres – 21.21 (Prague 2016)
- 400 metres – 46.36 (Ostrava 2020)
