= 2019 European Athletics Indoor Championships – Men's 400 metres =

The men's 400 metres event at the 2019 European Athletics Indoor Championships was held on 1 March 2019 at 10:20 (heats), at 21:00 (semifinals) and on 2 March 2019 at 20:22 (final) local time.

== Medalists ==
Gold	Silver	Bronze
Karsten Warholm; Norway	Óscar Husillos; Spain	Tony van Diepen; Netherlands

== Records ==
Standing records prior to the 2019 European Athletics Indoor Championships
World record	Kerron Clement (USA)	44.57	Fayetteville, AR, United States	12 March 2005
European record	Thomas Schönlebe (GDR)	45.05	Sindelfingen, West Germany	5 February 1988
Championship record	Pavel Maslák (CZE)	45.33	Prague, Czech Republic	7 March 2015
World Leading	Kahmari Montgomery (USA)	45.04	Birmingham, United States	23 February 2019
European Leading	Karsten Warholm (NOR)	45.56	Ulsteinvik, Norway	25 January 2019

== Results ==
=== Heats ===
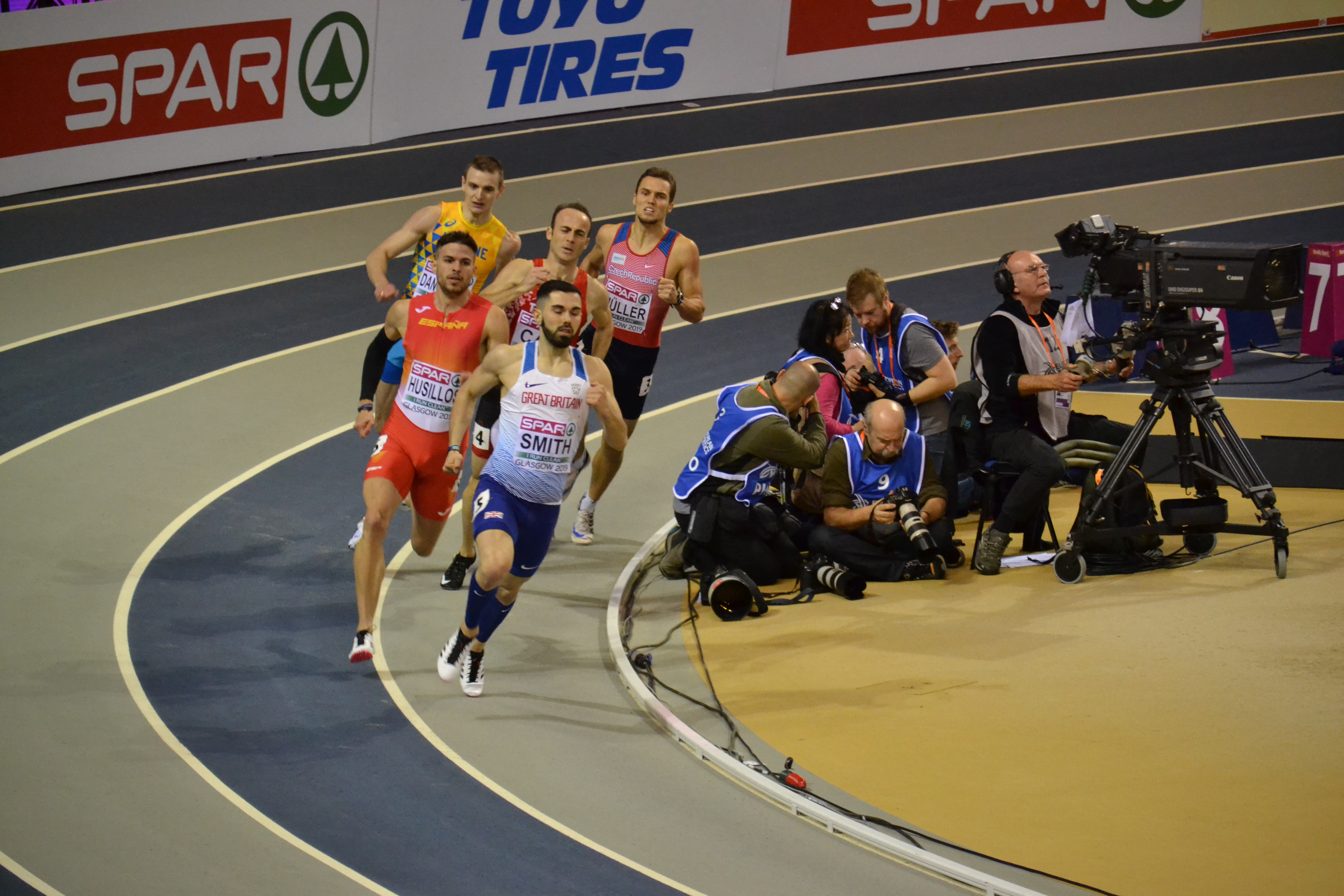
Heat 2

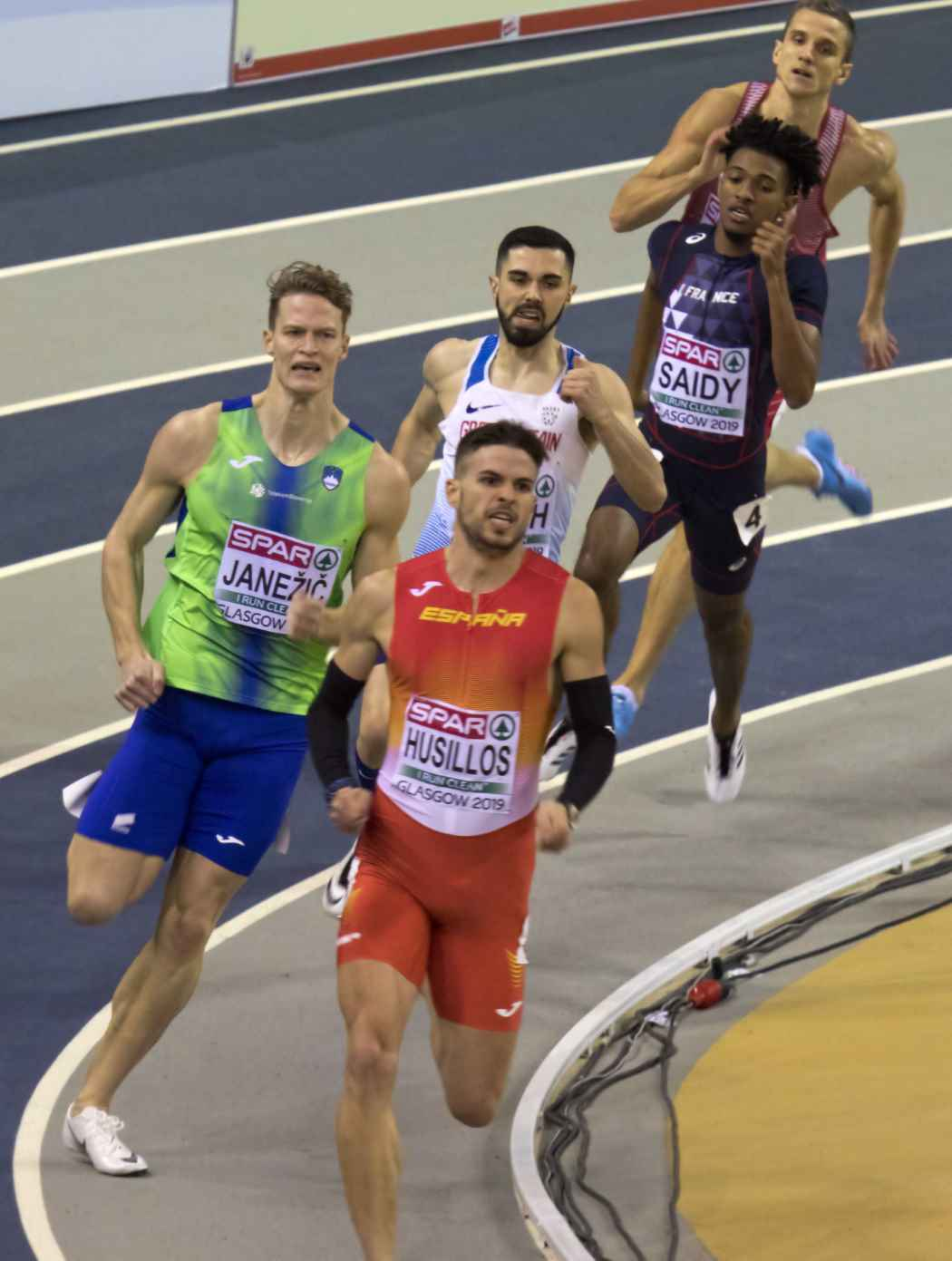
Semifinal 1

Qualification: First 2 in each heat (Q) and the next 4 fastest (q) advance to the Semifinal.

Rank	Heat	Athlete	Nationality	Time	Note
1	1	Luka Janežič	Slovenia	46.88	Q
2	1	Fabrisio Saidy	France	46.99	Q
3	3	Lucas Búa	Spain	47.00	Q
4	4	Karsten Warholm	Norway	47.05	Q
5	1	Cameron Chalmers	Great Britain	47.18	q
6	4	Vitaliy Butrym	Ukraine	47.22	Q
7	3	Tony van Diepen	Netherlands	47.32	Q
8	4	Manuel Guijarro	Spain	47.33	q
9	1	Janis Leitis	Latvia	47.34	q, SB
9	2	Óscar Husillos	Spain	47.34	Q
11	3	Karol Zalewski	Poland	47.45	q
12	2	Owen Smith	Great Britain	47.50	Q
13	2	Danylo Danylenko	Ukraine	47.59	
14	2	Yavuz Can	Turkey	47.63	
15	2	Vít Müller	Czech Republic	47.69	
16	1	Ricky Petrucciani	Switzerland	47.83	
17	1	Liemarvin Bonevacia	Netherlands	47.86	
18	4	Alex Haydock-Wilson	Great Britain	47.88	
19	4	Thomas Barr	Ireland	48.22	
20	3	Carl Bengtström	Sweden	49.50	
21	3	Jan Tesař	Czech Republic	1:26.29	
	3	Cillin Greene	Ireland	DNF	

=== Semifinals ===
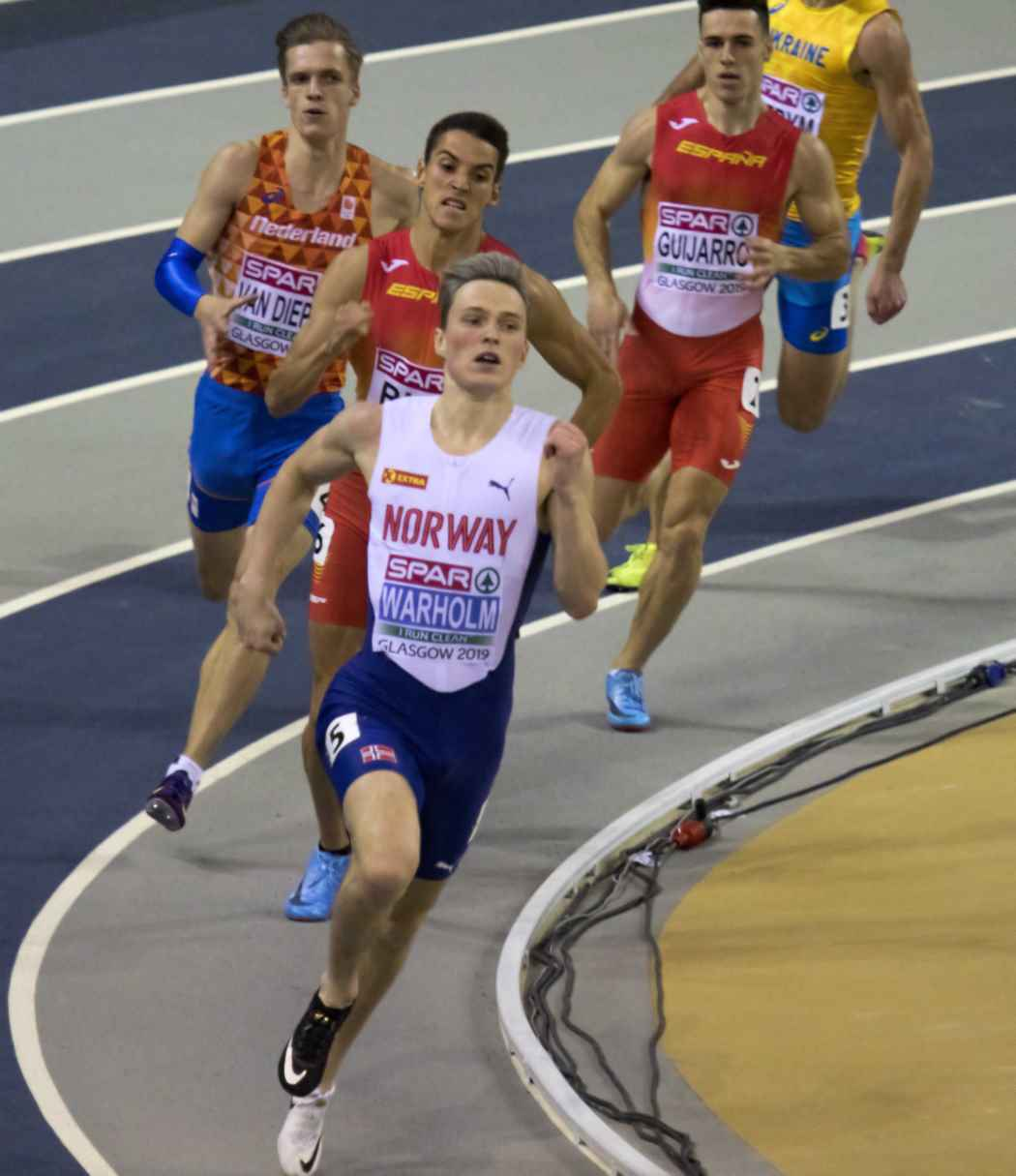
Semifinal 2

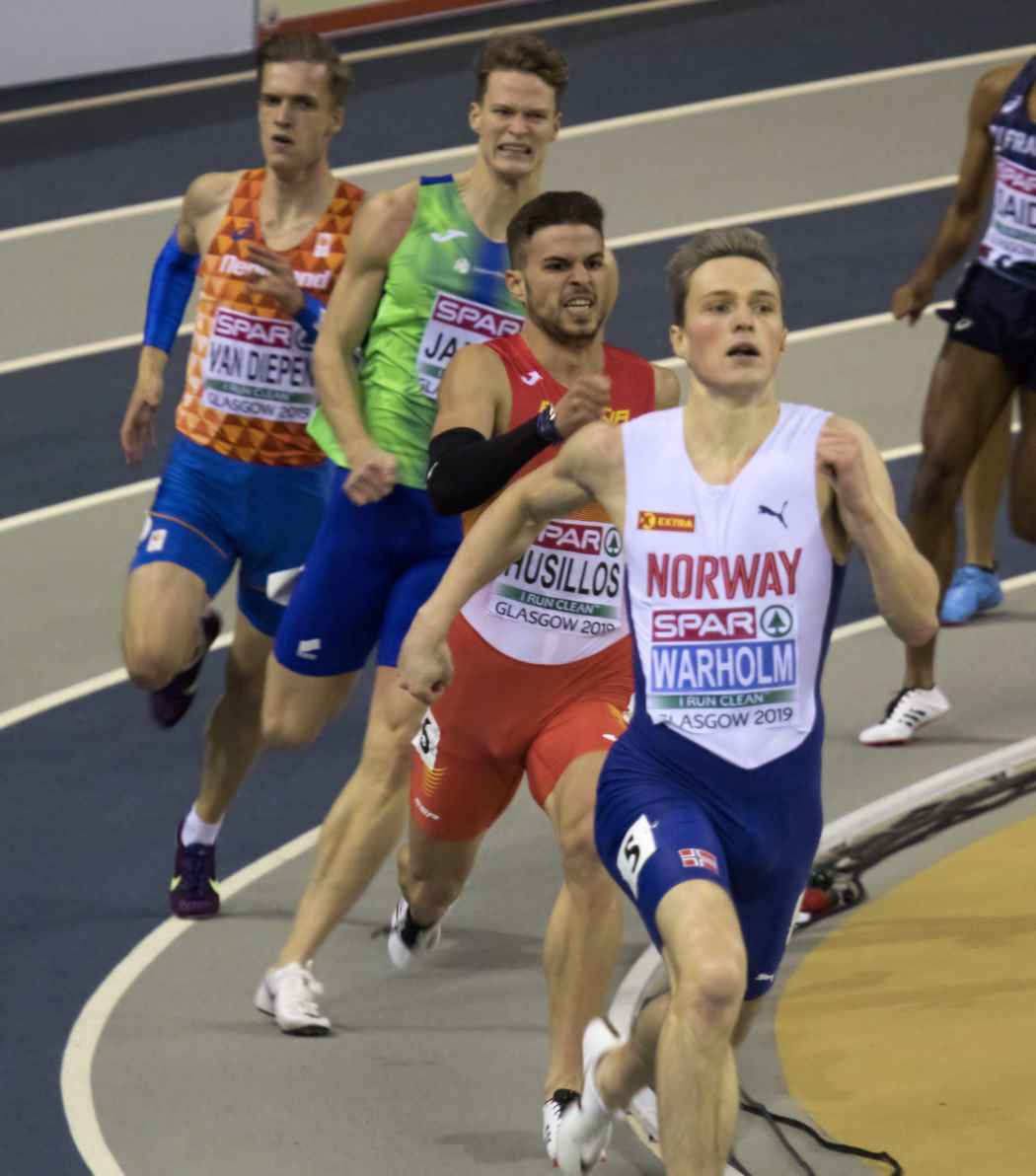
The final

Qualification: First 2 in each heat (Q) and the next 2 fastest (q) advance to the Final.

Rank	Heat	Athlete	Nationality	Time	Note
1	2	Karsten Warholm	Norway	45.95	Q
2	1	Óscar Husillos	Spain	46.31	Q, SB
3	1	Luka Janežič	Slovenia	46.60	Q
4	2	Tony van Diepen	Netherlands	46.62	Q, PB
5	2	Lucas Búa	Spain	46.81	q
6	1	Fabrisio Saidy	France	47.07	q
7	2	Vitaliy Butrym	Ukraine	47.20	
8	2	Manuel Guijarro	Spain	47.34	
9	1	Janis Leitis	Latvia	47.36	
10	1	Owen Smith	United Kingdom	47.39	
11	2	Cameron Chalmers	United Kingdom	47.83	
	1	Karol Zalewski	Poland	DNS	

=== Final ===
Rank	Lane	Athlete	Nationality	Time	Note
1st place, gold medalist(s)	5	Karsten Warholm	Norway	45.05	=AR, CR
2nd place, silver medalist(s)	6	Óscar Husillos	Spain	45.66	NR
3rd place, bronze medalist(s)	4	Tony van Diepen	Netherlands	46.13	NR
4	3	Luka Janežič	Slovenia	46.15	
5	2	Fabrisio Saidy	France	46.80	
6	1	Lucas Búa	Spain	46.92	
