= 2018 IAAF World Indoor Championships – Men's 4 × 400 metres relay =

Men's 4 × 400 metres relay at the 2018 IAAF World Indoor Championships
- Venue: Arena Birmingham
- Dates: 3–4 March
- Competitors: 40 from 10 nations
- Winning time: 3:01.77 WIR

Medalists
gold medal	Karol Zalewski; Rafał Omelko; Łukasz Krawczuk; Jakub Krzewina; Patryk Adamczyk*	Poland
silver medal	Fred Kerley; Michael Cherry; Aldrich Bailey Jr. Vernon Norwood; Marqueze Washington*; Paul Dedewo*	United States
bronze medal	Dylan Borlée; Jonathan Borlée; Jonathan Sacoor; Kevin Borlée	Belgium

Video on YouTube Official Video

The men's 4 × 400 metres relay at the 2018 IAAF World Indoor Championships took place on 3 and 4 March 2018.

== Summary ==
In the heats, the Dominican Republic rested their star, disqualified silver medalist Luguelín Santos. They didn't qualify and Santos did not get to run the final. Similarly, USA was able to rest their stars, Michael Cherry and Aldrich Bailey while successfully qualifying for the final. In the final, USA was out fast with Fred Kerley having a marginal edge at the break, but extending it by running an efficient tangent from lane 6, netting himself a 3-metre lead over Poland's Karol Zalewski. Zalewski kept that gap for most of the second lap, losing a little ground in the handoff. Kerley's split 44.84. The Borlée brothers, represented by Dylan Borlée, representing Belgium were an equal gap back. With an efficient handoff to Michael Cherry, USA gained another 3 metres. Through the second leg, Rafał Omelko chipped away at Cherry's lead, by the time the handoff took place, the gap between USA and Poland was back to 3 metres. Behind them, Jereem Richards brought Trinidad and Tobago past Jonathan Borlée and approached passing Omelko before fading back. Cherry's split was 45.39. The third leg for USA was Aldrich Bailey, vs Poland's Łukasz Krawczuk, Bailey lost another meter as Poland, Trinidad and Tobago and Belgium gained. Bailey's split 46.10. After taking the baton, USA's Vernon Norwood accelerated to open another metre. Behind him, Poland's Jakub Krzewina led the pursuers, with TTO's Lalonde Gordon and Belgium's Kevin Borlée in close order. By the end of the first lap, Norwood had extended the lead to 5 metres, but down the final backstretch, the lead began to shrink. Coming off the final turn, Krzewina had a burst of speed, Norwood straightened up and tightened up, Krzewina went by. Five metres back Borlée was attempting a similar move on Gordon, without as much authority. In a tight battle for bronze, Borlée was able to outlearn Gordon.

Poland's winning time was a new world indoor record, beating USA's team from four years earlier. The final split was timed at 45.44 from when Norwood crossed the line, but considering he made up at least three metres, Krzewina's time was considerably faster. Behind them, Belgium and Trinidad and Tobago set national records.

This world record was the first world record ever set for the IAAF World Indoor Championships. This exceeded their original goal of setting only the European world record. This upset the U.S.A. team's preformence which had also beaten the previous men's indoor 4x400 meter relay world record, but fell short to Poland's team. The previous record was held by the United States, with a time set at 3:02.14 in 2014.

== Results ==
=== Heats ===
The heats were started on 3 March at 12:32.

Rank	Heat	Lane	Nation	Athletes	Time	Notes
1	2	6	United States	Fred Kerley, Marqueze Washington, Paul Dedewo, Vernon Norwood	3:04.00	Q
2	1	6	Belgium	Dylan Borlée, Jonathan Borlée, Jonathan Sacoor, Kevin Borlée	3:05.22	Q, SB
3	1	5	Poland	Karol Zalewski, Patryk Adamczyk, Łukasz Krawczuk, Jakub Krzewina	3:05.24	Q, SB
4	2	5	Great Britain	Owen Smith, Sebastian Rodger, Jamal Rhoden-Stevens, Grant Plenderleith	3:05.29	Q, SB
5	1	3	Trinidad and Tobago	Renny Quow, Jereem Richards, Machel Cedenio, Lalonde Gordon	3:05.96	q, SB
6	1	4	Czech Republic	Michal Desenský, Vít Müller, Filip Šnejdr, Patrik Šorm	3:06.40	q, SB
7	2	2	Spain	Lucas Búa, Manuel Guijarro, Aleix Porras, Samuel García	3:07.52	SB
8	2	3	Dominican Republic	Juander Santos, Raymond Urbino, Andito Charles, Leonel Bonón	3:10.45	SB
	1	2	Ukraine		DNS	
	2	4	Jamaica		DNS	

=== Final ===
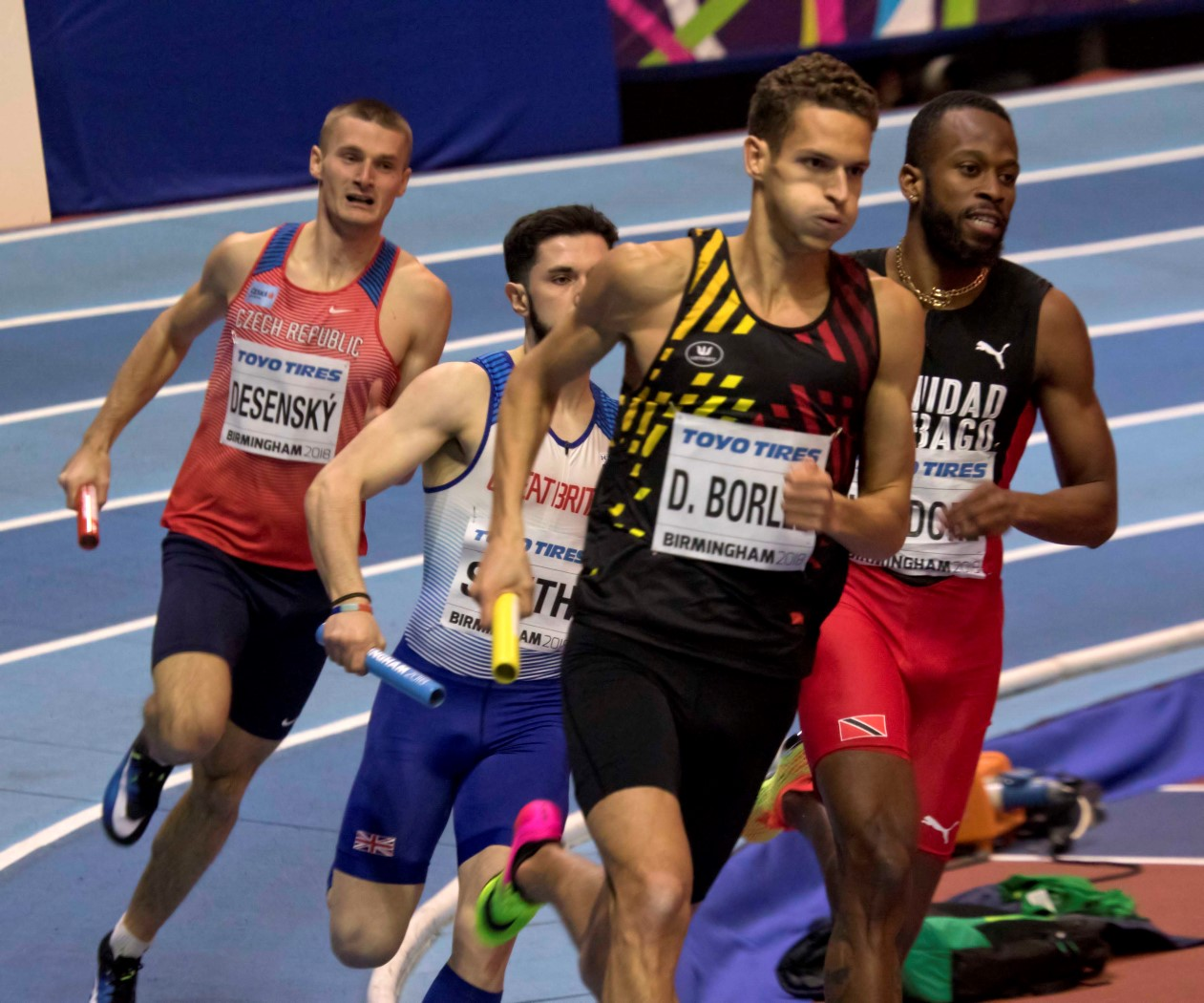
The first leg of the final

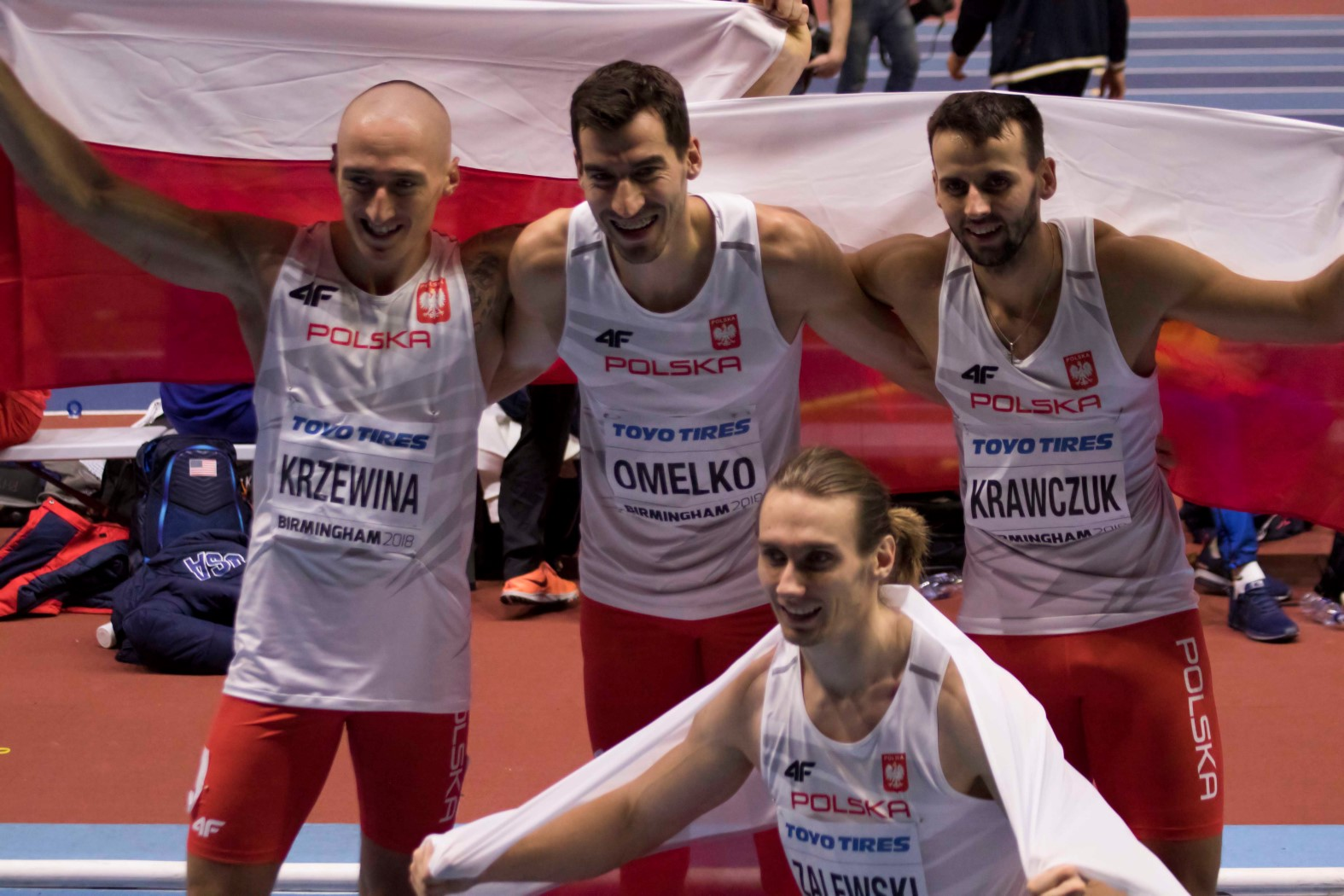
The winning Polish team

The final was started on 4 March at 15:58.

Rank	Lane	Nation	Athletes	Time	Notes
1st place, gold medalist(s)	4	Poland	Karol Zalewski, Rafał Omelko, Łukasz Krawczuk, Jakub Krzewina	3:01.77	WIR
2nd place, silver medalist(s)	6	United States	Fred Kerley, Michael Cherry, Aldrich Bailey Jr., Vernon Norwood	3:01.97	SB
3rd place, bronze medalist(s)	5	Belgium	Dylan Borlée, Jonathan Borlée, Jonathan Sacoor, Kevin Borlée	3:02.51	NIR
4	1	Trinidad and Tobago	Deon Lendore, Jereem Richards, Asa Guevara, Lalonde Gordon	3:02.52	NIR
5	2	Czech Republic	Michal Desenský, Patrik Šorm, Filip Šnejdr, Pavel Maslák	3:04.87	SB
6	3	Great Britain	Owen Smith, Grant Plenderleith, Jamal Rhoden-Stevens, Lee Thompson	3:05.08	SB
