= Vít Müller =

Czech athletics competitor

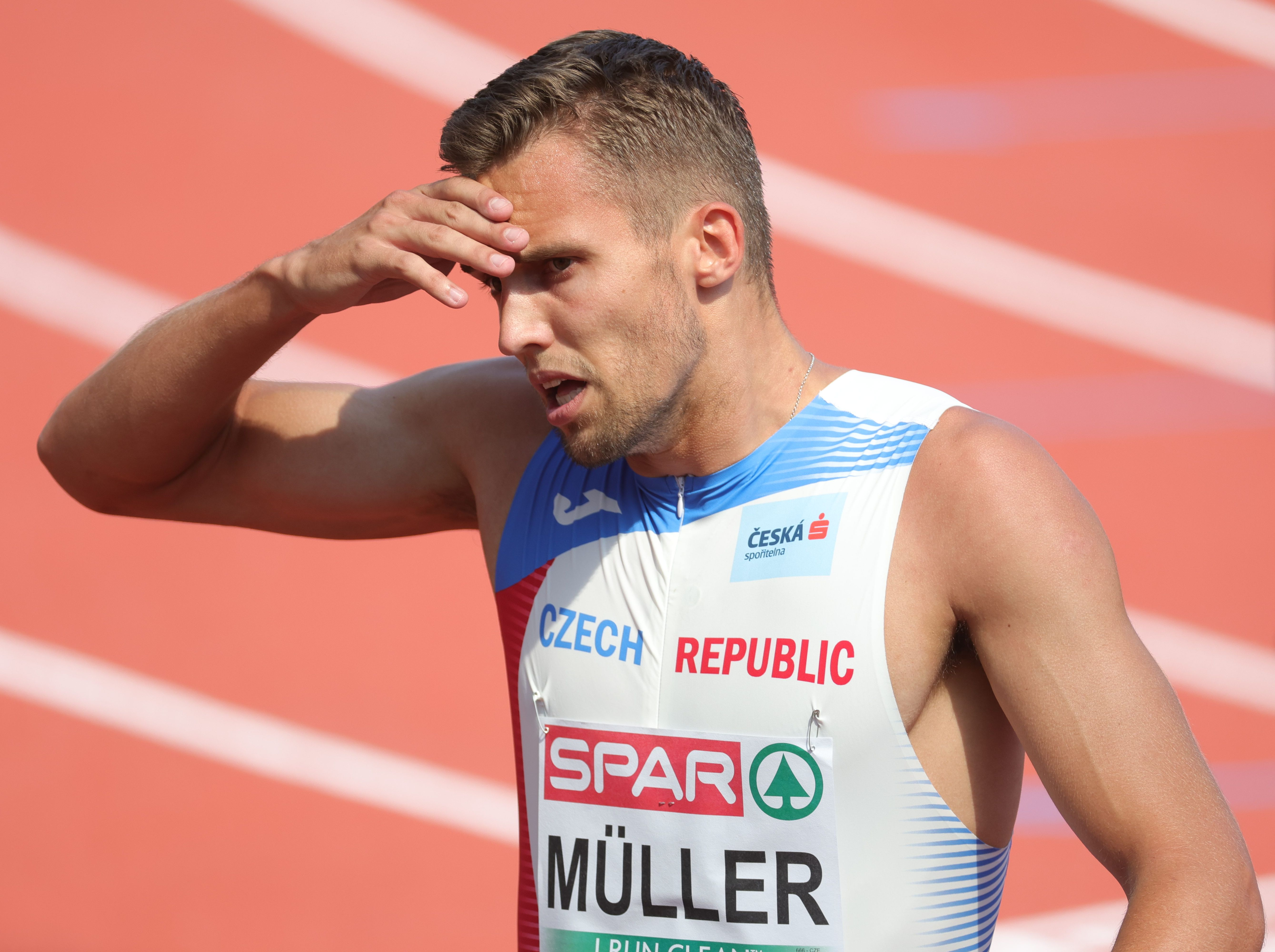
- Vít Müller in 2022

Personal information
- Born: 31 August 1996 (age 29)
- Education: Czech Technical University in Prague

Sport
- Sport: Athletics
- Event: 400 metres hurdles
- Club: TJ Sokol Hradec Králové
Medal record
Men's athletics
Representing Czech Republic
European Indoor Championships
Silver medal – second place	2021 Toruń	4 x 400 m
European Games
Gold medal – first place	2023 Kraków-Małopolska	4×400 m mixed
Summer Universiade
Bronze medal – third place	2017 Taipei	4 x 400 m

Vít Müller (born 31 August 1996) is a Czech athlete specialising in the 400 metres hurdles. He won a bronze medal in the 4 × 400 metres relay at the 2017 Summer Universiade.

== International competitions ==
Year	Competition	Venue	Position	Event	Notes
Representing the Czech Republic
2015	European Junior Championships	Eskilstuna, Sweden	27th (h)	400 m hurdles	54.84
2016	European Championships	Amsterdam, Netherlands	20th (sf)	400 m hurdles	50.70
2017	World Relays	Nassau, Bahamas	4th (B)	4 × 400 m relay	3:08.17
2017	European U23 Championships	Bydgoszcz, Poland	8th	400 m hurdles	50.63
2017	Universiade	Taipei, Taiwan	18th (sf)	400 m hurdles	51.46
2017	Universiade	Taipei, Taiwan	3rd	4 × 400 m relay	3:08.14
2018	World Indoor Championships	Birmingham, United Kingdom	6th (h)	4 × 400 m relay	3:06.40
2018	European Championships	Berlin, Germany	16th (h)	400 m hurdles	51.00
2018	European Championships	Berlin, Germany	3rd (h)	4 × 400 m relay	3:02.52
2019	European Indoor Championships	Glasgow, United Kingdom	15th (h)	400 m	47.69
2019	World Relays	Yokohama, Japan	3rd (B)	4 × 400 m relay	3:03.79
2019	Universiade	Naples, Italy	8th	400 m hurdles	50.86
2019	Universiade	Naples, Italy	5th	4 × 400 m relay	3:06.78
2019	World Championships	Doha, Qatar	19th (sf)	400 m hurdles	49.97
2021	European Indoor Championships	Toruń, Poland	29th (h)	400 m	47.60
2021	European Indoor Championships	Toruń, Poland	2nd	4 × 400 m relay	3:06.54
2021	Olympic Games	Tokyo, Japan	22nd (sf)	400 m hurdles	49.69
2021	Olympic Games	Tokyo, Japan	15th (h)	4 × 400 m relay	3:03.61
2022	World Indoor Championships	Belgrade, Serbia	5th	4 × 400 m relay	3:07.98
2022	World Championships	Eugene, United States	30th (h)	400 m hurdles	50.71
2022	European Championships	Munich, Germany	17th (sf)	400 m hurdles	49.78
2023	World Championships	Budapest, Hungary	24th (h)	400 m hurdles	49.37
2023	World Championships	Budapest, Hungary	12th (h)	4 × 400 m relay	3:00.99
2024	World Indoor Championships	Glasgow, United Kingdom	–	4 × 400 m relay	DNF
2024	European Championships	Rome, Italy	11th (sf)	400 m hurdles	49.25
2024	Olympic Games	Paris, France	8th (rep)	400 m hurdles	48.96
2025	European Indoor Championships	Apeldoorn, Netherlands	6th	4 × 400 m relay	3:08.28
2025	World Championships	Tokyo, Japan	26th (h)	400 m hurdles	49.02

== Personal bests ==
Outdoor

- 200 metres – 21.17 (-0.7 m/s, Ostrava 2018)
- 400 metres – 45.87 (Prague 2024)
- 400 metres hurdles – 48.41 (Zlín 2024, Ostrava 2025)

Indoor

- 200 metres – 21.16 (Prague 2023)
- 400 metres – 46.21 (Ostrava 2024)
