= Fabrisio Saïdy =

French sprinter

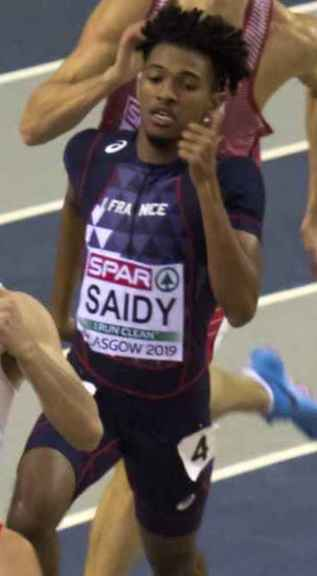
- Fabrisio Saidy in 2019

Personal information
- Born: 15 July 1999 (age 27) Antsiranana, Madagascar

Sport
- Sport: Athletics
- Event: 400 metres
- Club: Dominicaine Athlétisme

Fabrisio Saïdy (born 15 July 1999) is a French sprinter specialising in the 400 metres. He won a bronze medal in the 4 × 400 metres relay at the 2019 European Indoor Championships.

== International competitions ==
Year	Competition	Venue	Position	Event	Notes
Representing France
2017	European U20 Championships	Grosseto, Italy	2nd	4 × 400 m relay	3:09.04
2018	World U20 Championships	Tampere, Finland	4th	4 × 400 m relay	3:06.65
2019	Mediterranean U23 Indoor Championships	Miramas, France	3rd	400 m	48.43
2019	European Indoor Championships	Glasgow, United Kingdom	5th	400 m	46.80
2019	European Indoor Championships	Glasgow, United Kingdom	3rd	4 × 400 m relay	3:07.71
2019	World Relays	Yokohama, Japan	2nd (B)	4 × 400 m relay	3:02.99
2019	European U23 Championships	Gävle, Sweden	1st	400 m	45.79
2019	European U23 Championships	Gävle, Sweden	3rd	4 × 400 m relay	3:05.36
2024	Olympic Games	Paris, France	9th	4 × 400 m relay	3:07.30

== Personal bests ==
Outdoor

- 200 metres – 21.71 (-1.7 m/s, L'Étang-Salé 2017)
- 400 metres – 45.44 (La Chaux-de-Fonds, 2022)

Indoor

- 400 metres – 46.67 (Miramas 2019)
