= Ranti Dikgale =

South African sprinter (born 1987)

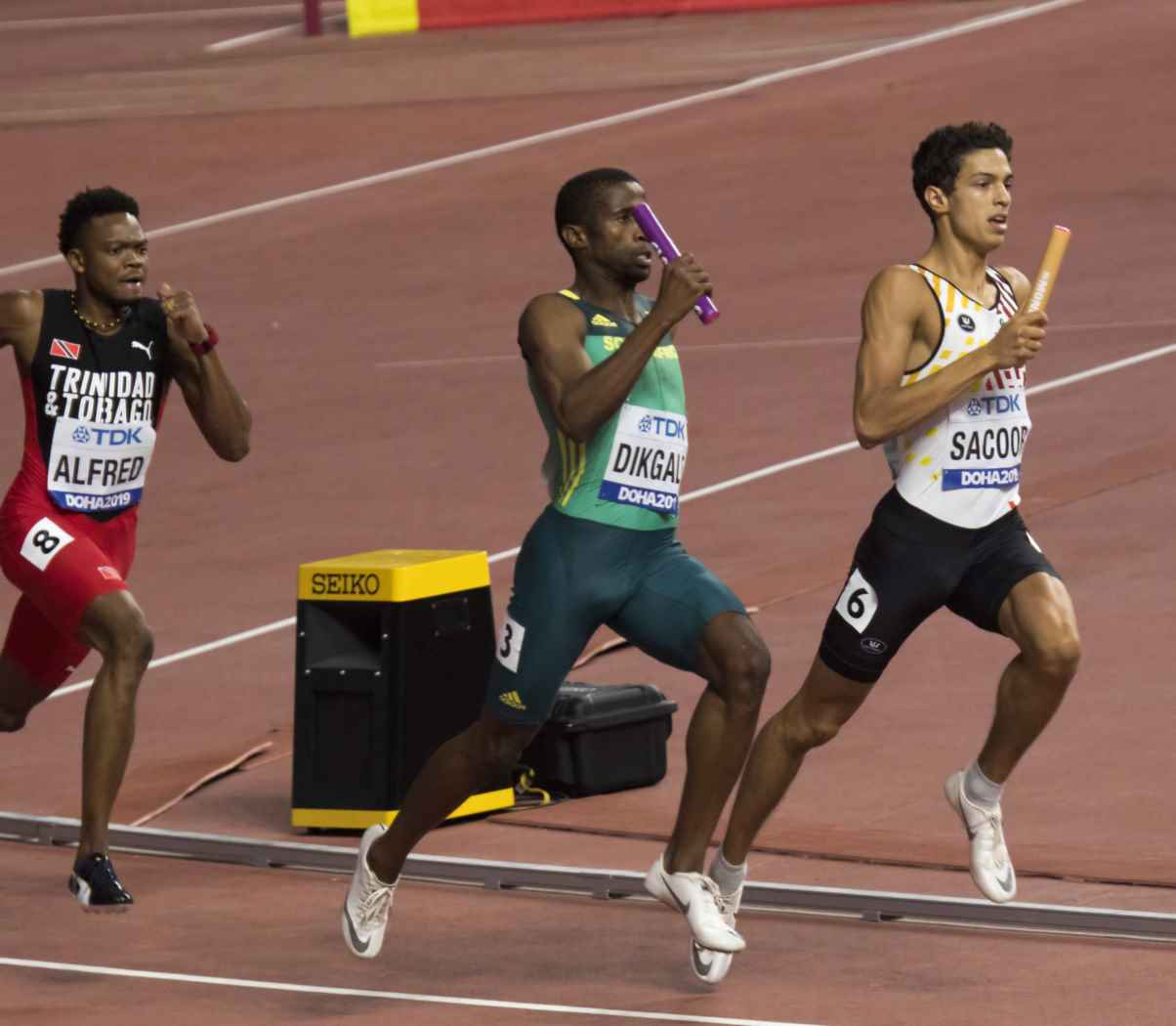
- Dikgale (in green) at the 2019 World Championships

Personal information
- Nationality: South African
- Born: 12 July 1987 (age 39) Phalaborwa, South Africa

Sport
- Sport: Athletics
- Event: 400 metres
Medal record
Men's athletics
Representing South Africa
African Games
Silver medal – second place	2019 Rabat	4 × 400 m

Ranti Dikgale (born 12 July 1987) is a South African athlete. He competed in the men's 4 × 400 metres relay event at the 2020 Summer Olympics held in Tokyo, Japan. In 2019, he won the silver medal in the men's 4 × 400 metres relay at the 2019 African Games held in Rabat, Morocco.

In July 2026, Dikgale was issued with a three-year ban backdated to May 2026 by the South African Institute for Drug Free Sport for an anti-doping rule violation after testing positive for exogenous testosterone.
