= Tony van Diepen =

Dutch athlete (born 1996)

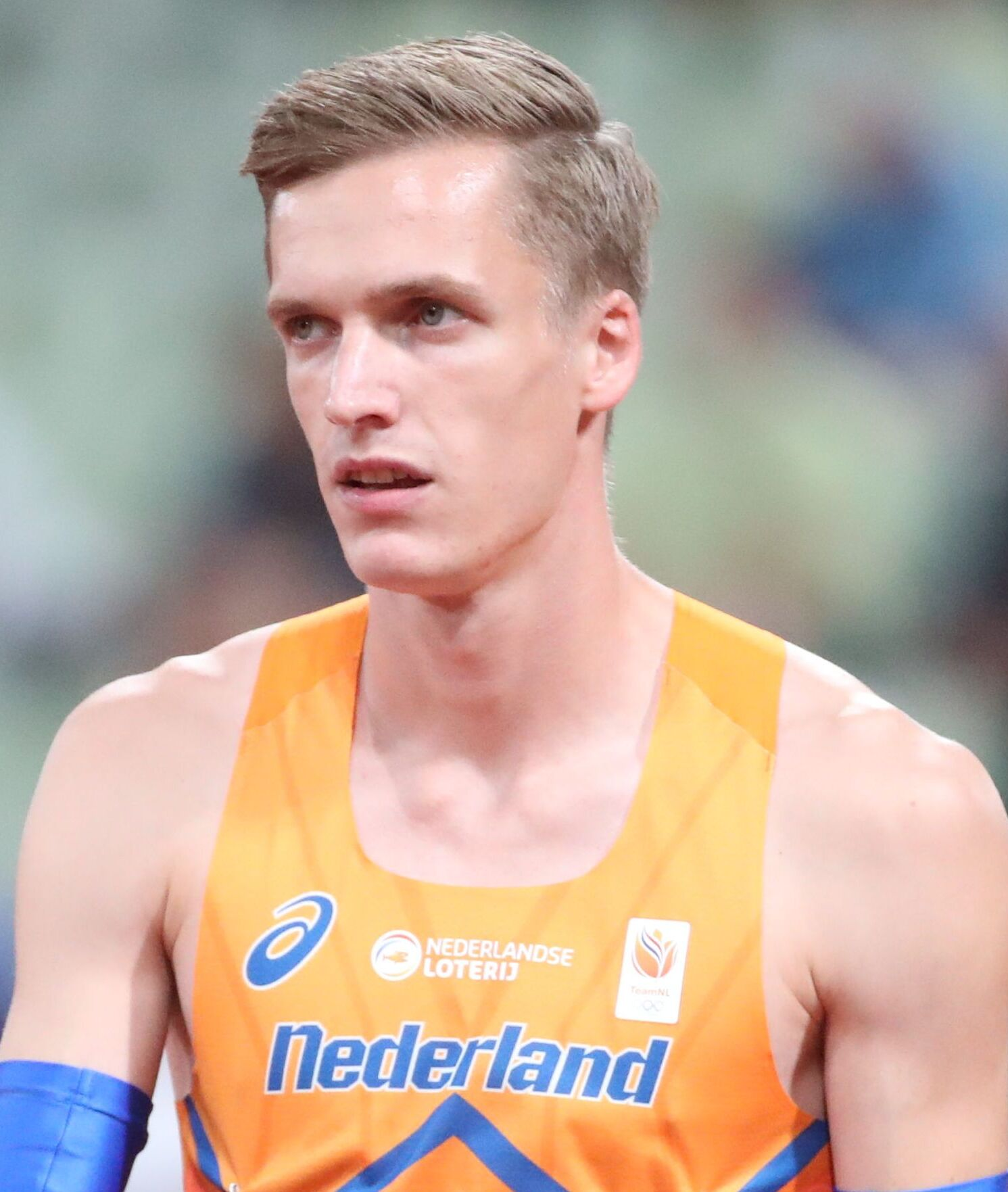
- Van Diepen in 2022

Personal information
- Born: 17 April 1996 (age 30) Heerhugowaard, Netherlands
- Height: 1.83 m (6 ft 0 in)
- Weight: 68 kg (150 lb)

Sport
- Country: Netherlands
- Sport: Athletics
- Events: 400 metres, 800 metres
- Club: Haag Atletiek
- Coached by: Grete Koens; Laurent Meuwly
Medal record
Men's athletics
Representing the Netherlands
Olympic Games
Silver medal – second place	2020 Tokyo	4 × 400 m relay
World Championships
Silver medal – second place	2022 Eugene	4 × 400 m mixed
World Indoor Championships
Bronze medal – third place	2022 Belgrade	4 × 400 m relay
Bronze medal – third place	2024 Glasgow	4 × 400 m relay
World Relays
Gold medal – first place	2021 Chorzów	4 × 400 m relay
European Indoor Championships
Gold medal – first place	2021 Toruń	4 × 400 m relay
Gold medal – first place	2025 Apeldoorn	4 × 400 m mixed
Gold medal – first place	2025 Apeldoorn	4 × 400 m relay
Silver medal – second place	2021 Toruń	400 m
Bronze medal – third place	2019 Glasgow	400 m

Tony van Diepen (Dutch: [ˈtoːni vɑn ˈdipən]; born 17 April 1996) is a Dutch track and field athlete competing in the 400 and 800 metres. He won the bronze medal in the 400 m at the 2019 European Indoor Championships and silver at the 2021 European Indoor Championships. Van Diepen earned five medals with Dutch 4 × 400 m relays, either men's or mixed, at major championships, including silver for the men's relay at the 2020 Tokyo Olympics.

He took four national titles.

== Achievements ==
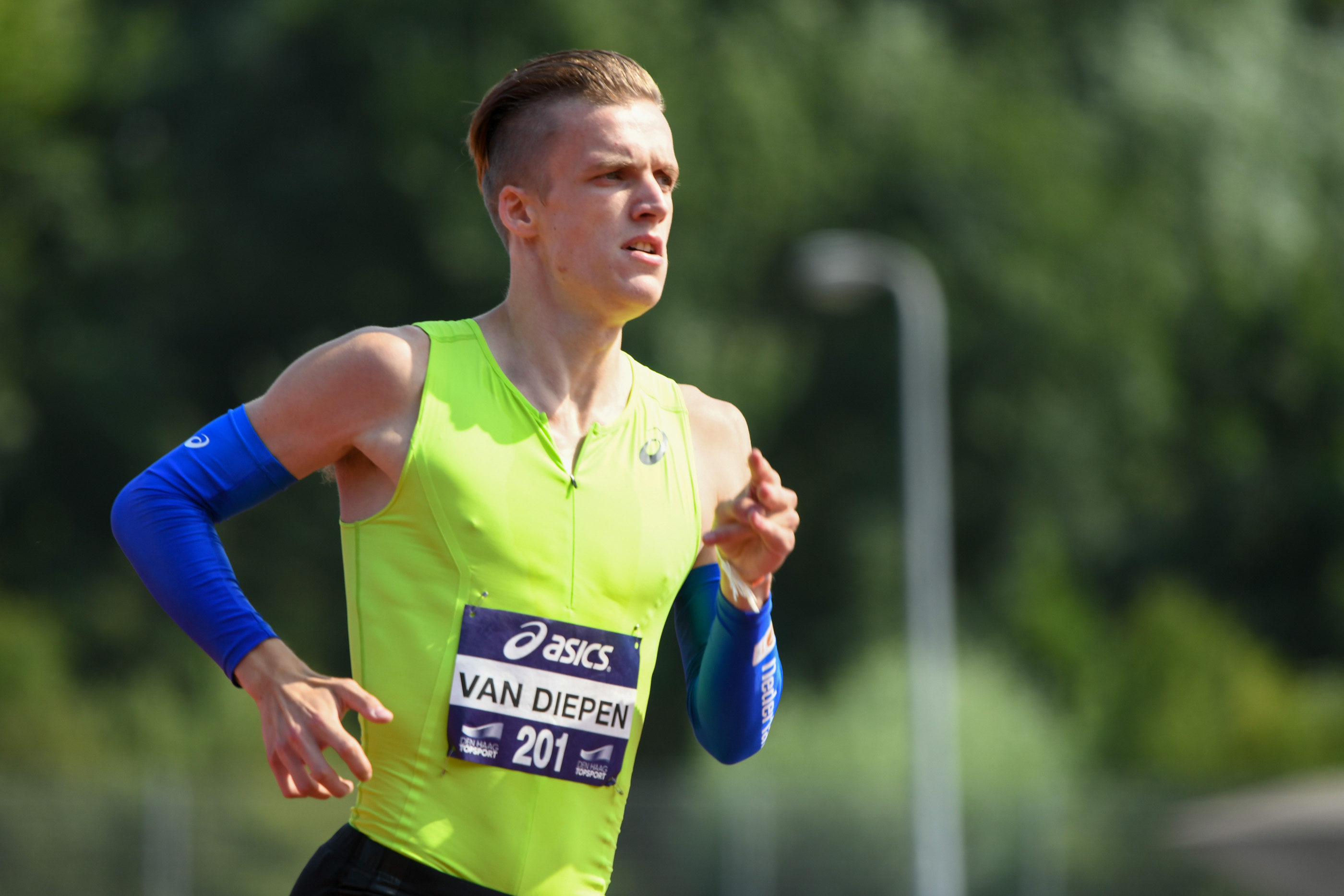
Van Diepen at the 2019 Dutch Athletics Championships in The Hague.

=== International competitions ===
Representing the Netherlands
Year	Competition	Venue	Position	Event	Time
2013	European Junior Championships	Rieti, Italy	24th (h)	800 m	1:53.44
2014	World Junior Championships	Eugene, OR, United States	16th (sf)	800 m	1:50.86
2015	European Junior Championships	Eskilstuna, Sweden	19th (sf)	800 m	1:53.60
2017	European Indoor Championships	Belgrade, Serbia	22nd (h)	400 m	48.57
2017	European U23 Championships	Bydgoszcz, Poland	16th (h)	800 m	1:50.38
2018	European Championships	Berlin, Germany	9th (h)	4 × 400 m relay	3:04.93
2019	European Indoor Championships	Glasgow, United Kingdom	3rd	400 m	46.13 NR
2019	World Relays	Yokohama, Japan	5th (B)	4 × 400 m relay	3:05.15
2021	European Indoor Championships	Toruń, Poland	2nd	400 m	46.25
2021	European Indoor Championships	Toruń, Poland	1st	4 × 400 m relay	3:06.06
2021	World Relays	Chorzów, Poland	1st	4 × 400 m relay	3:03.45
2021	Olympic Games	Tokyo, Japan	23rd (h)	800 m	1:46.03
2021	Olympic Games	Tokyo, Japan	2nd	4 × 400 m relay	2:57.18
2022	World Indoor Championships	Belgrade, Serbia	19th (h)	800 m	1:49.80
2022	World Indoor Championships	Belgrade, Serbia	3rd	4 × 400 m relay	3:06.90
2022	World Championships	Eugene, OR, United States	18th (sf)	800 m	1:46.70
2022	World Championships	Eugene, OR, United States	2nd	4 × 400 m mixed	3:09.90 NR
2022	European Championships	Munich, Germany	6th (sf)	800 m	1:47.64
2023	European Indoor Championships	Istanbul, Turkey	14th (h)	800 m	1:48.50
2024	World Indoor Championships	Glasgow, United Kingdom	3rd	4 × 400 m relay	3:04.25
2025	European Indoor Championships	Apeldoorn, Netherlands	1st	4 × 400 m mixed	3:15.63
2025	European Indoor Championships	Apeldoorn, Netherlands	1st	4 × 400 m relay	3:04.95
2026	World Indoor Championships	Toruń, Poland	4th	4 × 400 m relay	3:06.05

=== Personal bests ===
- 400 metres – 45.83 (La Chaux-de-Fonds 2019)
  - 400 metres indoor – 46.06 (Toruń 2021)
- 600 metres – 1:16.08 (Pliezhausen 2018)
  - 600 metres indoor – 1:17.73 (Ulsteinvik 2020)
- 800 metres – 1:44.14 (Paris 2022)
  - 800 metres indoor – 1:46.36 (Liévin 2023)
- 1500 metres – 3:53.58 (Tilburg 2020)

=== National titles ===
- Dutch Athletics Championships
  - 400 metres: 2018
  - 800 metres: 2026
- Dutch Indoor Athletics Championships
  - 400 metres: 2018, 2019, 2020
