= Liemarvin Bonevacia =

Dutch sprinter (born 1989)

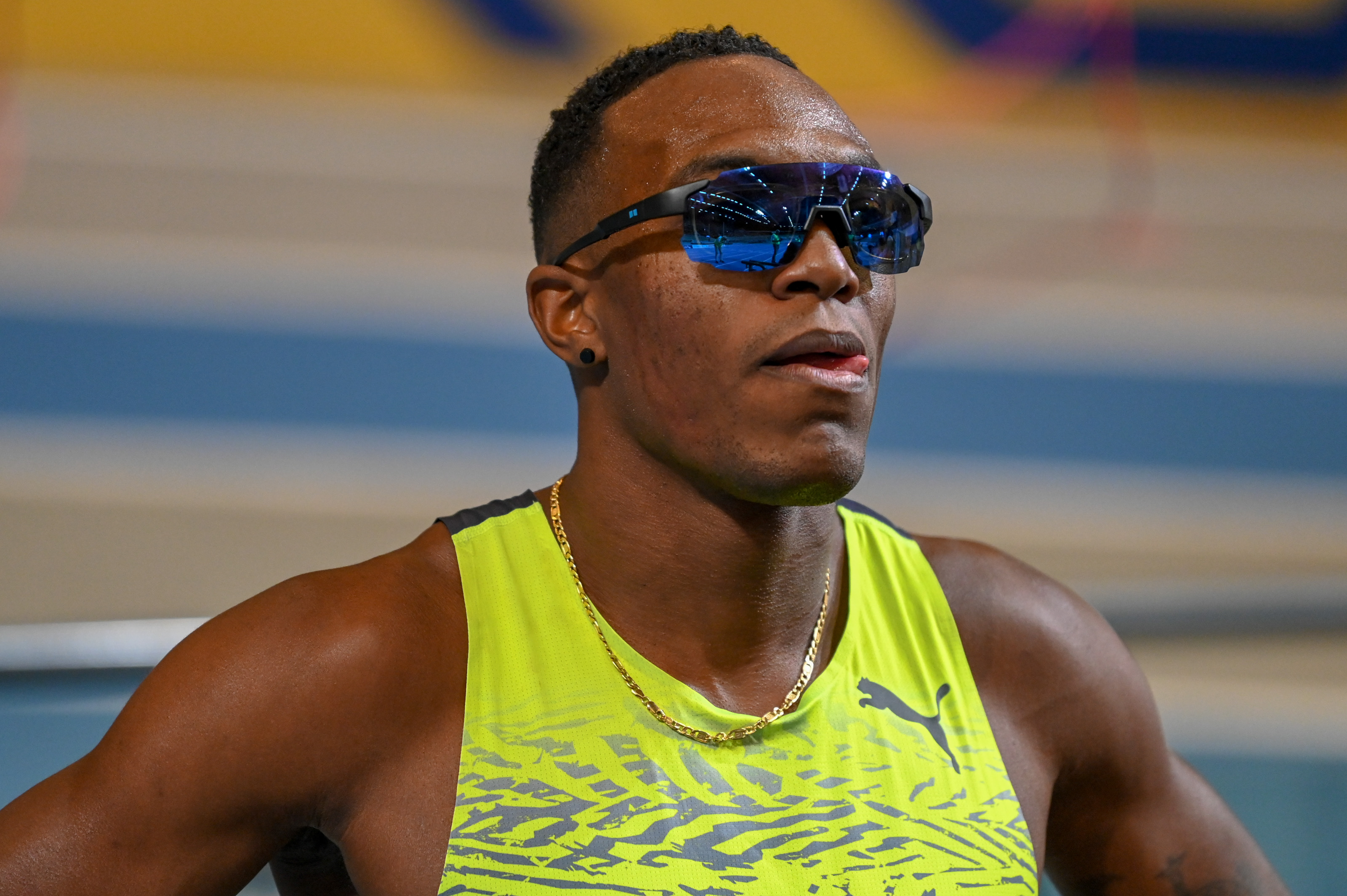
- Bonevacia at the 2023 Dutch Indoor Championships in Apeldoorn

Personal information
- Born: 5 April 1989 (age 37) Willemstad, Netherlands Antilles (present-day Curaçao)
- Height: 1.80 m (5 ft 11 in)
- Weight: 81 kg (179 lb)

Sport
- Country: Netherlands
- Sport: Athletics
- Event: 400 metres
- Coached by: Laurent Meuwly

Achievements and titles
- Personal bests: 100 m: 10.40 (2017); 200 m: 20.45 (2021); 300 m: 32.25 (2017); 400 m: 44.48 (2021, NR until 2026); Indoors; 200 m: 21.09 i (2018); 400 m: 45.48 i (2022, NR until 2026)
Medal record
Men's athletics
Representing the Netherlands
Olympic Games
| Silver medal – second place | 2020 Tokyo | 4 × 400 m relay |
World Championships
| Silver medal – second place | 2022 Eugene | 4 × 400 m mixed |
World Relays
| Gold medal – first place | 2021 Chorzów | 4 × 400 m relay |
European Championships
| Bronze medal – third place | 2016 Amsterdam | 400 m |
| Bronze medal – third place | 2024 Rome | 4 × 400 m mixed |
| Bronze medal – third place | 2024 Rome | 400 m |
| Bronze medal – third place | 2026 Birmingham | 4 × 400 m relay |
European Indoor Championships
| Gold medal – first place | 2021 Toruń | 4 × 400 m relay |
| Bronze medal – third place | 2017 Belgrade | 400 m |
| Bronze medal – third place | 2021 Toruń | 400 m |
| Bronze medal – third place | 2023 Istanbul | 4 × 400 m relay |
European Games
| Bronze medal – third place | 2023 Kraków-Małopolska | 400 m |

Liemarvin Bonevacia (born 5 April 1989) is a retired Dutch sprinter specialising in the 400 metres. He won bronze medals in the event at the 2016 and 2024 European Athletics Championships, and the 2017 and 2021 European Indoor Championships. Bonevacia also earned five major medals for the 4 × 400 m relays, either men's or mixed, including silver medal in the men's relay at the 2020 Tokyo Olympics.

He is the Dutch record holder for the outdoor and indoor 400 m, and won 12 individual national titles (200 m, 400 m). Bonevacia was born in Willemstad (Curaçao island), Netherlands Antilles.

== Career ==
As Netherlands Antilles was dissolved in 2010 Curaçao became constituent country within the Kingdom of the Netherlands.Thus, qualified for the 2012 London Olympics, Bonevacia could choose to represent the Netherlands or participate independently under the Olympic flag. He was one of four people to participate in the Games as an 'Independent Olympic Athlete'. He competed in the men's 400 metres and was eliminated in the semifinals, when he injured his right hamstring and finished last.

Bonevacia has represented Netherlands since 2013.

On 27 July 2014, during Dutch Championships, he broke Arjen Visserman's Dutch 400 m record dating back to 1986 with a time of 45.41 seconds.

Bonevacia lowered his own national record with a 44.72 clocking in the heats at the 2015 World Championships in Athletics held in Beijing, China.

He competed for the Netherlands at the 2016 Rio Olympics, in the 400 m and men's 4 × 100 m relay, reaching the semifinals in his individual event.

Bonevacia won bronze medals in the 400 m at the 2016 European Athletics Championships in Amsterdam, and at the 2017 and 2021 European Indoor Championships held in Belgrade, Serbia and Toruń, Poland, respectively. He also won bronze in the 400 m at the 2024 European Athletics Championships in Rome. His time of 44.88 seconds is awaiting ratification as a European record in Masters athletics (M 35).

== Statistics ==
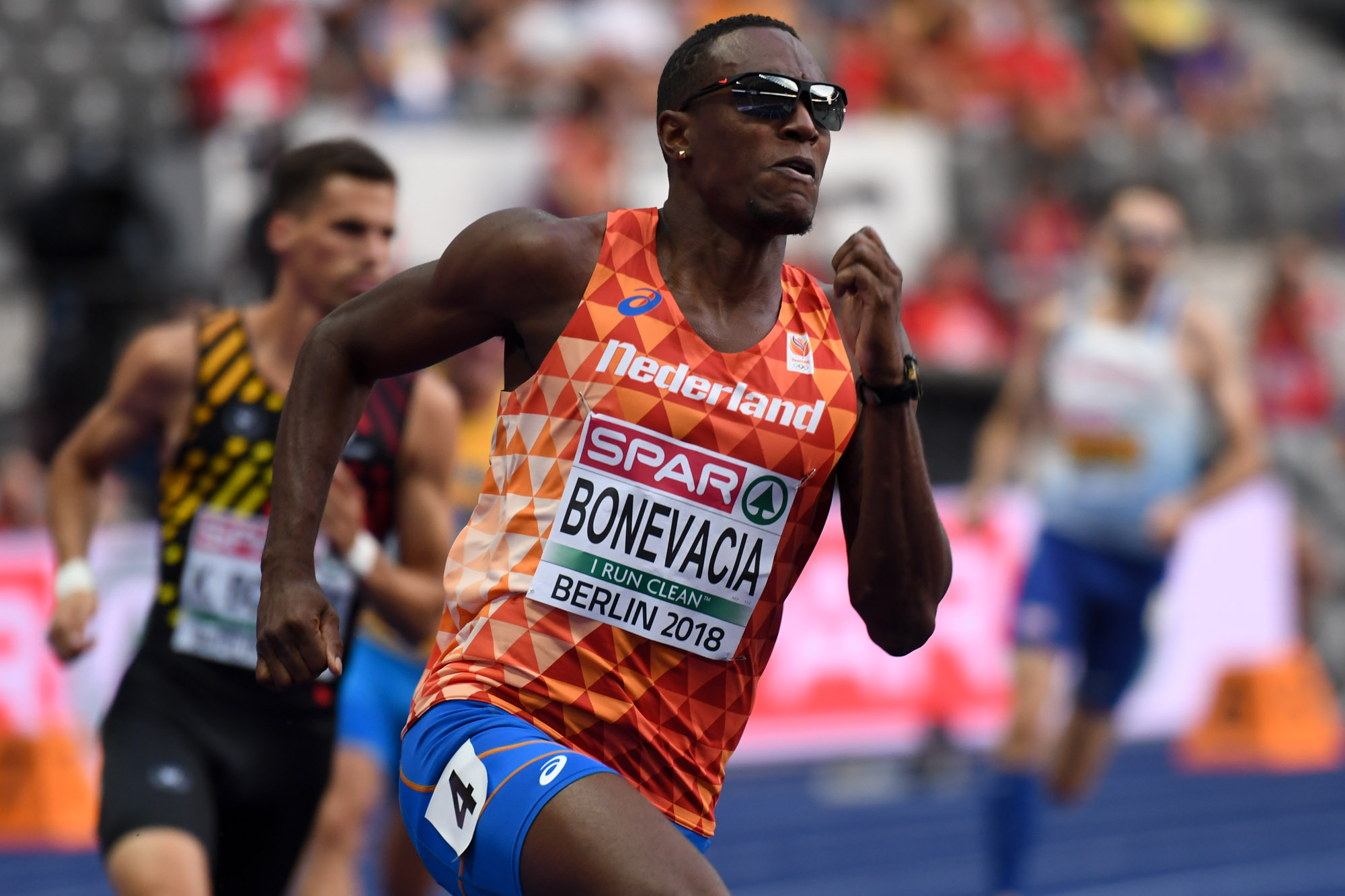
Liemarvin Bonevacia at the 2018 European Championships in Berlin

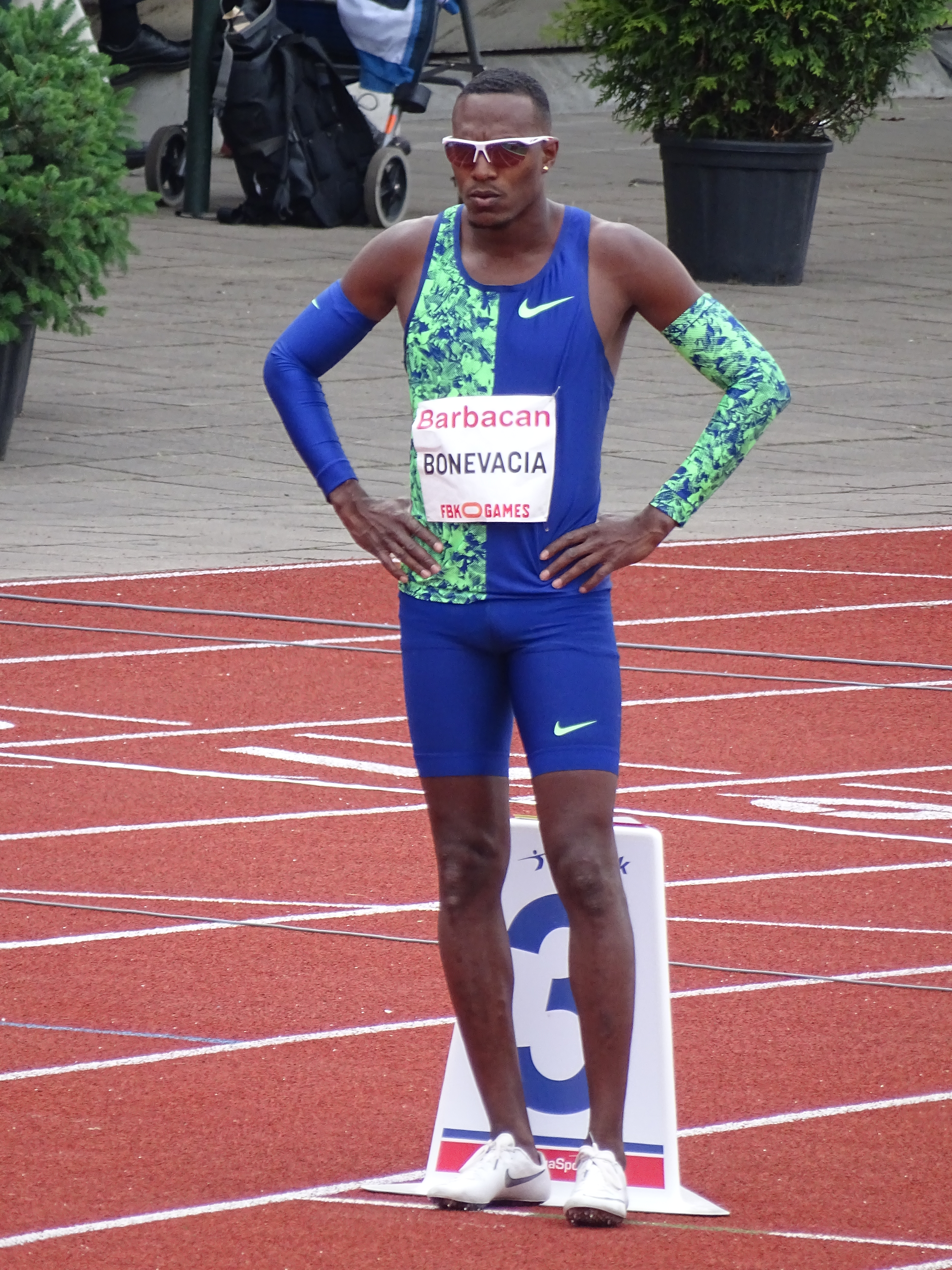
Bonevacia at the 2019 FBK Games in Hengelo

=== International competitions ===
| Year | Competition | Venue | Position | Event | Time | Notes |
Representing Netherlands Antilles
| 2010 | NACAC U23 Championships | Miramar, FL, United States | 13th (h) | 200 m | 21.62 | |
| 2010 | NACAC U23 Championships | Miramar, FL, United States | 12th (h) | 400 m | 48.21 | |
| 2010 | NACAC U23 Championships | Miramar, FL, United States | 6th | 4 × 400 m relay | 3:15.66 | NR |
Representing Curaçao
| 2011 | CAC Championships | Mayagüez, Puerto Rico | 14th (h) | 400 m | 48.04 | |
| 2011 | CAC Championships | Mayagüez, Puerto Rico | 9th (h) | 4 × 100 m relay | 41.49 | |
Representing Netherlands Antilles
| 2011 | Universiade | Shenzhen, China | 26th (qf) | 200 m | 21.60 | |
| 2011 | Universiade | Shenzhen, China | 22nd (sf) | 400 m | 48.26 | |
Representing Independent Olympic Athletes
| 2012 | Olympic Games | London, United Kingdom | 24th (sf) | 400 m | 96.42 (Note: Bonevacia suffered from hamstring injury.) | |
Representing Netherlands
| 2013 | European Team Championships First League | Dublin, Ireland | 4th | 400 m | 47.38 | |
| 2013 | European Team Championships First League | Dublin, Ireland | 3rd | 4 × 400 m relay | 3:10.46 | |
| 2013 | World Championships | Moscow, Russia | 5th | 4 × 100 m relay | 38.37 | SB |
| 2014 | European Championships | Zürich, Switzerland | 18th (sf) | 400 m | 46.38 | |
| 2014 | European Championships | Zürich, Switzerland | 10th (h) | 4 × 400 m relay | 3:05.93 | |
| 2015 | European Indoor Championships | Prague, Czech Republic | 20th (h) | 400 m | 47.62 | |
| 2015 | World Relays | Nassau, Bahamas | – (h) | 4 × 400 m relay | DNF | |
| 2015 | European Team Championships First League | Heraklion, Greece | 2nd | 400 m | 45.94 | |
| 2015 | European Team Championships First League | Heraklion, Greece | 2nd | 4 × 400 m relay | 3:04.91 | |
| 2015 | World Championships | Beijing, China | 24th (sf) | 400 m | 45.65 | (h NR (Note: Bonevacia set a Dutch record of 44.72 seconds in the heats.)) |
| 2015 | World Championships | Beijing, China | 8th (h) | 4 × 100 m relay | 38.41 | SB |
| 2016 | World Indoor Championships | Portland, OR, United States | 19th (h) | 400 m | 47.48 | |
| 2016 | European Championships | Amsterdam, Netherlands | 3rd | 400 m | 45.41 | SB |
| 2016 | European Championships | Amsterdam, Netherlands | 7th | 4 × 400 m relay | 3:04.52 | |
| 2016 | Olympic Games | Rio de Janeiro, Brazil | 15th (sf) | 400 m | 45.03 | SB |
| 2016 | Olympic Games | Rio de Janeiro, Brazil | 14th (h) | 4 × 100 m relay | 38.53 | |
| 2017 | European Indoor Championships | Belgrade, Serbia | 3rd | 400 m | 46.26 | NR |
| 2017 | European Team Championships Super League | Villeneuve-d'Ascq, France | – (f) | 400 m | DQ | |
| 2017 | European Team Championships Super League | Villeneuve-d'Ascq, France | 2nd | 4 × 400 m relay | 3:02.37 | |
| 2017 | World Championships | London, United Kingdom | 11th (h) | 4 × 100 m relay | 38.66 | SB |
| 2018 | European Championships | Berlin, Germany | 11th (sf) | 400 m | 45.39 | |
| 2018 | European Championships | Berlin, Germany | 9th (h) | 4 × 400 m relay | 3:04.93 | |
| 2019 | European Indoor Championships | Glasgow, United Kingdom | 17th (h) | 400 m | 47.86 | |
| 2019 | World Relays | Yokohama, Japan | 10th | 4 × 400 m relay | 3:05.15 | |
| 2019 | European Team Championships First League | Sandnes, Norway | 4th | 400 m | 46.83 | |
| 2021 | European Indoor Championships | Toruń, Poland | 3rd | 400 m | 46.30 | |
| 2021 | European Indoor Championships | Toruń, Poland | 1st | 4 × 400 m relay | 3:06.06 | |
| 2021 | World Relays | Chorzów, Poland | 1st | 4 × 400 m relay | 3:03.45 | |
| 2021 | European Team Championships First League | Cluj-Napoca, Romania | 2nd | 4 × 400 m relay | 3:02.49 | |
| 2021 | Olympic Games | Tokyo, Japan | 8th | 400 m | 45.07 | |
| 2021 | Olympic Games | Tokyo, Japan | 2nd | 4 × 400 m relay | 2:57.18 | NR |
| 2021 | Olympic Games | Tokyo, Japan | 4th | 4 × 400 m mixed | 3:10.36 | NR |
| 2022 | World Championships | Eugene, OR, United States | 15th (sf) | 400 m | 45.50 | |
| 2022 | World Championships | Eugene, OR, United States | 2nd | 4 × 400 m mixed | 3:09.90 | NR |
| 2022 | European Championships | Munich, Germany | 4th | 400 m | 45.17 | SB |
| 2022 | European Championships | Munich, Germany | 5th | 4 × 400 m relay | 3:01.34 | SB |
| 2023 | European Indoor Championships | Istanbul, Turkey | 7th (sf) | 400 m | 46.60 | |
| 2023 | European Indoor Championships | Istanbul, Turkey | 3rd | 4 × 400 m relay | 3:06.59 | SB |
| 2023 | World Championships | Budapest, Hungary | 14th (sf) | 400 m | 45.23 | |
| 2024 | World Indoor Championships | Glasgow, United Kingdom | 3rd | 4 × 400 m relay | 3:04.25 | |
| 2024 | European Championships | Rome, Italy | 3rd | 4 × 400 m mixed | 3:10.73 | |
| 2024 | European Championships | Rome, Italy | 3rd | 400 m | 44.88 | AM35R |
| 2025 | World Championships | Tokyo, Japan | 8th | 4 × 400 m relay | 3:04.84 | |
| 2026 | World Indoor Championships | Toruń, Poland | 4th | 4 × 400 m relay | 3:06.05 | |
| 2026 | European Championships | Birmingham, United Kingdom | 3rd | 4 × 400 m relay | 3:00.98 | (Note: Time from the heats. Bonevacia was replaced in the final.) |

=== National titles ===
- Dutch Athletics Championships
  - 200 metres: 2015
  - 400 metres: 2014, 2015, 2016, 2017, 2021, 2022
- Dutch Indoor Athletics Championships
  - 200 metres: 2018
  - 400 metres: 2015, 2017, 2021, 2022

== Notes ==
Awards
| Preceded by Eelco Sintnicolaas | Men's Dutch Athlete of the Year; 2015 | Succeeded by Churandy Martina |
