= Laurent Meuwly =

Swiss sports coach

Laurent Meuwly (French pronunciation: [loʁɑ̃ mœli]) is a Swiss athletics coach. He is the current head coach of the Dutch sprinters, hurdlers, and relay teams including Femke Bol and Lieke Klaver. Previously, he was the head coach of the Swiss sprinters, hurdlers, and relay teams. In 2023, he won the Coaching Achievement Award of World Athletics.
