= 2021 European Athletics Indoor Championships =

- Edition: 36th
- Dates: 4–7 March
- Host city: Toruń, Poland
- Venue: Arena Toruń
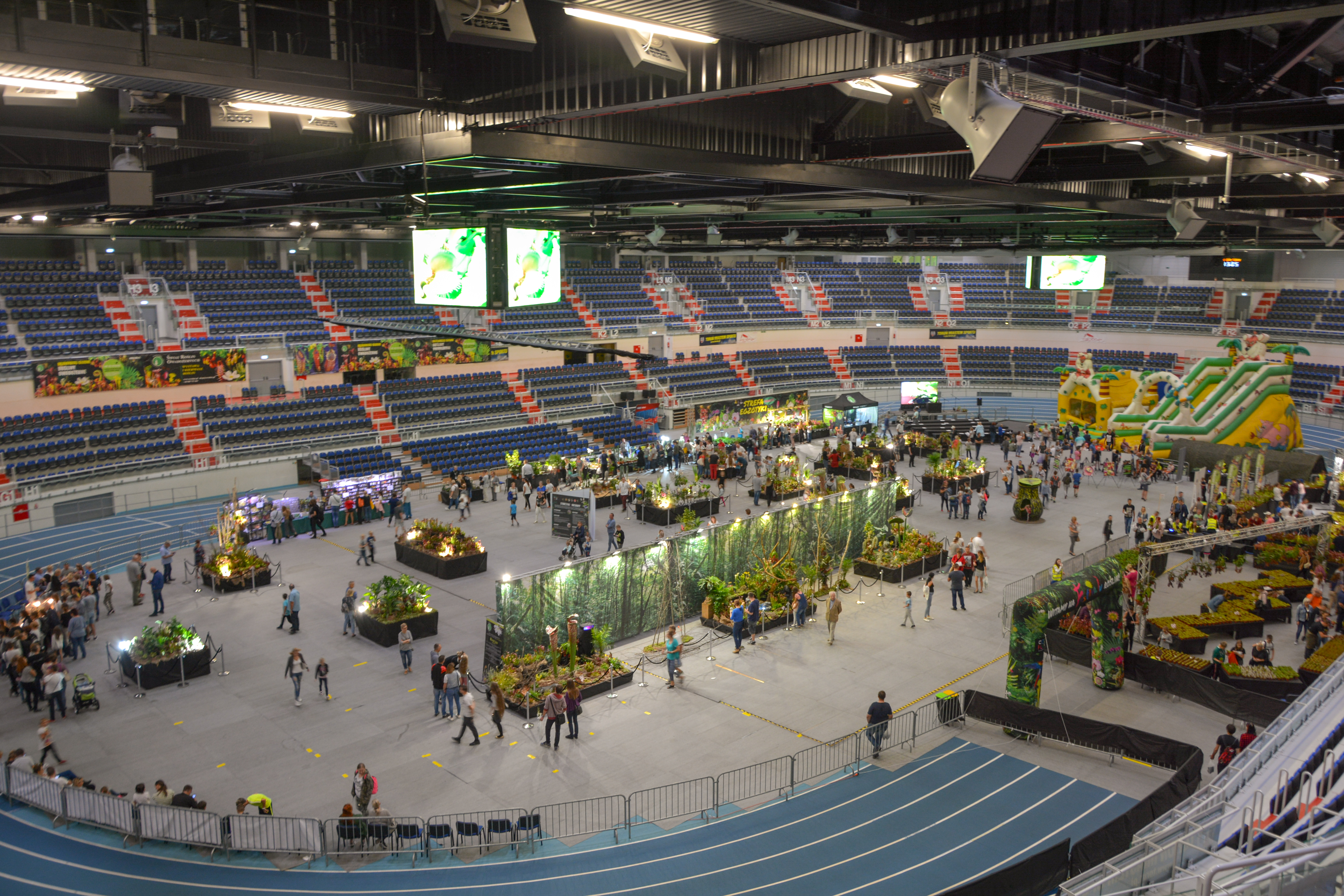
- Level: Senior
- Type: Indoor
- Events: 26
- Participation: 659 athletes from 46 nations

The 2021 European Athletics Indoor Championships was held from 4 to 7 March 2021 at the Arena Toruń in Toruń, Poland. This was the second time this event was held in Poland after the 1975 edition in Katowice. The four-day competition featured 13 men's and 13 women's athletics events. Altogether 659 athletes from 46 countries participated in the event which is a record in the competition's history. The Netherlands topped the medal table for the first time with four gold, one silver and two bronze medals. Katarzynka, a gingerbread, was the mascot.

== Schedule ==
All times are local (UTC+1).

Thursday, 4 March

| Time | Event | Gender |
|---|---|---|
| 19:00 | High Jump Q | M |
| 19:08 | Long Jump Q | M |
| 19:15 | Shot Put Q | W |
| 19:30 | 3000 m R1 | W |
| 20:20 | 1500 m R1 | M |

Friday, 5 March

| Time | Event | Gender |
|---|---|---|
| 10:00 | 60 m hurdles Pentathlon | W |
| 10:11 | Triple Jump Q | M |
| 10:13 | 400 m R1 | M |
| 10:52 | High Jump Pentathlon | W |
| 11:18 | Shot Put Q | M |
| 11:22 | 400 m R1 | W |
| 12:18 | Long Jump Q | W |
| 12:22 | 1500 m R1 | W |
| 13:00 | 800 m R1 | W |
| 13:05 | Shot Put Pentathlon | W |
| 19:00 | Long Jump Pentathlon | W |
| 19:06 | Shot Put Final | W |
| 19:10 | 400 m SF | M |
| 19:13 | High Jump Q | W |
| 19:33 | 400 m SF | W |
| 19:55 | 800 m R1 | M |
| 20:20 | Long Jump Final | M |
| 20:35 | Shot Put Final | M |
| 20:45 | 800 m Pentathlon Final | W |
| 21:00 | 3000 m Final | W |
| 21:35 | 1500 m Final | M |

Saturday, 6 March

| Time | Event | Gender |
|---|---|---|
| 10:00 | 60 m Heptathlon | M |
| 10:04 | Pole Vault Q | M |
| 10:18 | 60 m R1 | M |
| 10:42 | Long Jump Heptathlon | M |
| 11:25 | 3000 m R1 | M |
| 12:05 | Triple Jump Q | W |
| 12:10 | 60 m hurdles R1 | W |
| 13:05 | 60 m hurdles R1 | M |
| 13:15 | Shot Put Heptathlon | M |
| 13:50 | 60 m SF | M |
| 18:45 | Pole Vault Final | W |
| 18:50 | High Jump Heptathlon | M |
| 19:00 | 800 m SF | W |
| 19:25 | 800 m SF | M |
| 19:40 | Long Jump Final | W |
| 19:50 | 1500 m Final | W |
| 20:10 | 400 m Final | M |
| 20:25 | 400 m Final | W |
| 20:58 | 60 m Final | M |

Sunday, 7 March

| Time | Event | Gender |
|---|---|---|
| 10:18 | 60 m R1 | W |
| 10:53 | Triple Jump Final | M |
| 11:00 | Pole Vault Heptathlon | M |
| 11:25 | High Jump Final | M |
| 12:40 | 60 m SF | W |
| 13:05 | 60 m hurdles SF | M |
| 13:30 | 60 m hurdles SF | W |
| 17:00 | 60 m hurdles Final | M |
| 17:05 | Pole Vault Final | M |
| 17:15 | 60 m hurdles Final | W |
| 17:20 | Triple Jump Final | W |
| 17:30 | 1000 m Heptathlon Final | M |
| 17:45 | High Jump Final | W |
| 17:52 | 3000 m Final | M |
| 18:13 | 800 m Final | W |
| 18:25 | 800 m Final | M |
| 18:46 | 60 m Final | W |
| 18:57 | 4 × 400 m Final | M |
| 19:10 | 4 × 400 m Final | W |

== Men's results ==
=== Track ===
| Event | Gold | | Silver | | Bronze | |
|---|---|---|---|---|---|---|
| 60 metres | Marcell Jacobs; Italy | 6.47 WL, NR | Kevin Kranz; Germany | 6.60 | Ján Volko; Slovakia | 6.61 |
| 400 metres | Óscar Husillos; Spain | 46.22 SB | Tony van Diepen; Netherlands | 46.25 | Liemarvin Bonevacia; Netherlands | 46.30 |
| 800 metres | Patryk Dobek; Poland | 1:46.81 | Mateusz Borkowski; Poland | 1:46.90 | Jamie Webb; Great Britain | 1:46.95 |
| 1500 metres | Jakob Ingebrigtsen; Norway | 3:37.56 | Marcin Lewandowski; Poland | 3:38.06 | Jesús Gómez; Spain | 3:38.47 |
| 3000 metres | Jakob Ingebrigtsen; Norway | 7:48.20 PB | Isaac Kimeli; Belgium | 7:49.41 | Adel Mechaal; Spain | 7:49.47 |
| 60 metres hurdles | Wilhem Belocian; France | 7.42 EL | Andrew Pozzi; Great Britain | 7.43 =PB | Paolo Dal Molin; Italy | 7.56 |
| 4 × 400 metres relay | Netherlands; Jochem Dobber; Liemarvin Bonevacia; Ramsey Angela; Tony van Diepen | 3:06.06 EL, NR | Czech Republic; Vít Müller; Pavel Maslák; Michal Desenský; Patrik Šorm | 3:06.54 | Great Britain; Joe Brier; Owen Smith; James Williams; Lee Thompson | 3:06.70 |

=== Field ===
| Event | Gold | | Silver | | Bronze | |
|---|---|---|---|---|---|---|
| High jump | Maksim Nedasekau; Belarus | 2.37 WL, NR | Gianmarco Tamberi; Italy | 2.35 =SB | Thomas Carmoy; Belgium | 2.26 |
| Pole vault | Armand Duplantis; Sweden | 6.05 CR | Valentin Lavillenie; France | 5.80 =PB | Piotr Lisek; Poland | 5.80 =SB |
| Long jump | Miltiadis Tentoglou; Greece | 8.35 WL | Thobias Montler; Sweden | 8.31 NR | Kristian Pulli; Finland | 8.24 NR |
| Triple jump | Pedro Pichardo; Portugal | 17.30 | Alexis Copello; Azerbaijan | 17.04 SB | Max Heß; Germany | 17.01 SB |
| Shot put | Tomáš Staněk; Czech Republic | 21.62 SB | Michał Haratyk; Poland | 21.47 | Filip Mihaljević; Croatia | 21.31 |

=== Combined ===
| Event | Gold | | Silver | | Bronze | |
|---|---|---|---|---|---|---|
| Heptathlon | Kevin Mayer; France | 6392 pts WL | Jorge Ureña; Spain | 6158 pts | Paweł Wiesiołek; Poland | 6133 pts PB |

== Women's results ==
=== Track ===
| Event | Gold | | Silver | | Bronze | |
|---|---|---|---|---|---|---|
| 60 metres | Ajla Del Ponte; Switzerland | 7.03 WL, =NR | Lotta Kemppinen; Finland | 7.22 | Jamile Samuel; Netherlands | 7.22 SB |
| 400 metres | Femke Bol; Netherlands | 50.63 EL, NR | Justyna Święty-Ersetic; Poland | 51.41 | Jodie Williams; Great Britain | 51.73 PB |
| 800 metres | Keely Hodgkinson; Great Britain | 2:03.88 | Joanna Jóźwik; Poland | 2:04.00 | Angelika Cichocka; Poland | 2:04.15 |
| 1500 metres | Elise Vanderelst; Belgium | 4:18.44 | Holly Archer; Great Britain | 4:19.91 | Hanna Klein; Germany | 4:20.07 |
| 3000 metres | Amy-Eloise Markovc; Great Britain | 8:46.43 PB | Alice Finot; France | 8:46.54 PB | Verity Ockenden; Great Britain | 8:46.60 PB |
| 60 metres hurdles | Nadine Visser; Netherlands | 7.77 WL, NR | Cindy Sember; Great Britain | 7.89 | Tiffany Porter; Great Britain | 7.92 |
| 4 × 400 metres relay | Netherlands; Lieke Klaver; Marit Dopheide; Lisanne de Witte; Femke Bol | 3:27.15 CR, NR | Great Britain; Zoey Clark; Jodie Williams; Ama Pipi; Jessie Knight | 3:28.20 | Poland; Natalia Kaczmarek; Małgorzata Hołub-Kowalik; Kornelia Lesiewicz; Aleksandra Gaworska | 3:29.94 |

=== Field ===
| Event | Gold | | Silver | | Bronze | |
|---|---|---|---|---|---|---|
| High jump | Yaroslava Mahuchikh; Ukraine | 2.00 | Iryna Herashchenko; Ukraine | 1.98 PB | Ella Junnila; Finland | 1.96 NR |
| Pole vault | Angelica Moser; Switzerland | 4.75 PB | Tina Šutej; Slovenia | 4.70 =PB | Holly Bradshaw; Great Britain Iryna Zhuk; Belarus | 4.65 |
| Long jump | Maryna Bekh-Romanchuk; Ukraine | 6.92 WL | Malaika Mihambo; Germany | 6.88 SB | Khaddi Sagnia; Sweden | 6.75 |
| Triple jump | Patrícia Mamona; Portugal | 14.53 NR | Ana Peleteiro; Spain | 14.52 SB | Neele Eckhardt; Germany | 14.52 PB |
| Shot put | Auriol Dongmo; Portugal | 19.34 | Fanny Roos; Sweden | 19.29 NR | Christina Schwanitz; Germany | 19.04 |

=== Combined ===
| Event | Gold | | Silver | | Bronze | |
|---|---|---|---|---|---|---|
| Pentathlon | Nafissatou Thiam; Belgium | 4904 pts WL, NR | Noor Vidts; Belgium | 4791 pts PB | Xénia Krizsán; Hungary | 4644 pts |

== Medal table ==
* Host nation (Poland)

| Rank | Nation | Gold | Silver | Bronze | Total |
|---|---|---|---|---|---|
| 1 | Netherlands | 4 | 1 | 2 | 7 |
| 2 | Portugal | 3 | 0 | 0 | 3 |
| 3 | Great Britain | 2 | 4 | 6 | 12 |
| 4 | Belgium | 2 | 2 | 1 | 5 |
| 5 | France | 2 | 2 | 0 | 4 |
| 6 | Ukraine | 2 | 1 | 0 | 3 |
| 7 | Norway | 2 | 0 | 0 | 2 |
| 7 | Switzerland | 2 | 0 | 0 | 2 |
| 9 | Poland* | 1 | 5 | 4 | 10 |
| 10 | Spain | 1 | 2 | 2 | 5 |
| 11 | Sweden | 1 | 2 | 1 | 4 |
| 12 | Italy | 1 | 1 | 1 | 3 |
| 13 | Czech Republic | 1 | 1 | 0 | 2 |
| 14 | Belarus | 1 | 0 | 1 | 2 |
| 15 | Greece | 1 | 0 | 0 | 1 |
| 16 | Germany | 0 | 2 | 4 | 6 |
| 17 | Finland | 0 | 1 | 2 | 3 |
| 18 | Azerbaijan | 0 | 1 | 0 | 1 |
| 18 | Slovenia | 0 | 1 | 0 | 1 |
| 20 | Croatia | 0 | 0 | 1 | 1 |
| 20 | Hungary | 0 | 0 | 1 | 1 |
| 20 | Slovakia | 0 | 0 | 1 | 1 |
| Totals (22 entries) | | 26 | 26 | 27 | 79 |

== Participating nations ==
- Albania (2)
- Andorra (1)
- Armenia (2)
- ART (1)
- Austria (7)
- Azerbaijan (1)
- Belarus (22)
- Belgium (30)
- Bosnia and Herzegovina (3)
- Bulgaria (7)
- Croatia (4)
- Cyprus (3)
- Czech Republic (21)
- Denmark (15)
- Estonia (7)
- Finland (19)
- France (25)
- Georgia (3)
- Germany (46)
- Great Britain (42)
- Greece (19)
- Hungary (21)
- Ireland (23)
- Israel (2)
- Italy (43)
- Kosovo (1)
- Latvia (2)
- Lithuania (9)
- Luxembourg (4)
- Malta (1)
- Montenegro (2)
- Netherlands (31)
- North Macedonia (1)
- Norway (12)
- Poland (36)
- Portugal (16)
- Romania (15)
- San Marino (1)
- Serbia (8)
- Slovakia (7)
- Slovenia (13)
- Spain (36)
- Sweden (29)
- Switzerland (23)
- Turkey (13)
- Ukraine (30)

== See also ==
- Italy at the 2021 European Athletics Indoor Championships
