= 2025 European Athletics Indoor Championships – Mixed 4 × 400 metres relay =

Mixed 4 × 400 metres relay at the 2025 European Athletics Indoor Championships
- Venue: Omnisport Apeldoorn
- Location: Apeldoorn, Netherlands
- Dates: 6 March 2025 (final)
- Teams: 6 national teams
- Winning time: 3:15.63 min CR NR

Medalists
gold medal	Nick Smidt; Eveline Saalberg; Tony van Diepen; Femke Bol	Netherlands
silver medal	Julien Watrin; Imke Vervaet; Christian Iguacel; Helena Ponette	Belgium
bronze medal	Alastair Chalmers; Emily Newnham; Joshua Faulds; Lina Nielsen	Great Britain

The mixed 4 × 400 metres relay at the 2025 European Athletics Indoor Championships was held in one round at the short track of Omnisport in Apeldoorn, Netherlands, on 6 March 2025. It was the first time this mixed-sex event was contested at the European Athletics Indoor Championships.

The race was won by the team of the Netherlands in a championship record and Dutch record of 3:15.63 minutes, followed by the team of Belgium in 3:16.19 minutes and the team of Great Britain and Northern Ireland in 3:16.49 minutes.

== Background ==
The 2025 European Athletics Indoor Championships were held in Omnisport Apeldoorn in Apeldoorn, Netherlands. It was the first time that the mixed 4 × 400 metres relay was contested at the European Indoor Championships. The removable indoor athletics track was retopped for these championships in September 2024.

Records before the 2025 European Athletics Indoor Championships
Record	Team	Time	Location	Date
World record	Vacant	3:12.44	—	
European record	Vacant	3:15.50	—	
Championship record	Vacant	—		
World leading	Ireland (IRL)	3:19.78	Dublin, Ireland	15 January 2025
European leading	Ireland (IRL)	3:19.78	Dublin, Ireland	15 January 2025

== Qualification ==
In the mixed 4 × 400 metres relay, host country the Netherlands was allocated one place. Three places were allocated in accordance with the order of ranking of European Athletics member federation official teams in 4 × 400 m combined outdoor lists 2024. The other two places were allocated in accordance with the accumulated 400 m times of individual athletes from 2024 indoor season as at 10 days prior to the first day of the European Athletics Indoor Championships (24 February 2025).

== Final ==
Six national teams competed in the final on 6 March at 21:50 (UTC+1) in the evening.

In the first leg, Julien Watrin of Belgium was out as the fastest, followed by Nick Smidt of the Netherlands and Michal Desenský of the Czech Republic. Just before the 300-metres point, Smidt passed Watrin and handed the baton over first to Eveline Saalberg of the Netherlands. Saalberg was leading the race until she was passed near the end of the second leg by Imke Vervaet of Belgium and Emily Newnham of Great Britain, who had already passed Marcela Pírková of the Czech Republic earlier in the leg. Throughout the third leg, the running order was Christian Iguacel of Belgium, Joshua Faulds of Great Britain, and Tony van Diepen of the Netherlands. At the final handover, Faulds' baton didn't reach Lina Nielsen of Great Britain smoothly, leading Femke Bol of the Netherlands to move into second position. Near the 300-metres point, Bol also passed Helena Ponette of Belgium.

The race was won by the team of the Netherlands in a championship record (CR) and national record (NR) of 3:15.63 min, followed by the team of Belgium in 3:16.19 min and team of Great Britain and Northern Ireland in 3:16.49 min.

Results of the final
Rank	Lane	Nation	Athletes	Time	Note
1st place, gold medalist(s)	6	Netherlands	Nick Smidt, Eveline Saalberg, Tony van Diepen, Femke Bol	3:15.63	CR, NR
2nd place, silver medalist(s)	4	Belgium	Julien Watrin, Imke Vervaet, Christian Iguacel, Helena Ponette	3:16.19	
3rd place, bronze medalist(s)	5	Great Britain	Alastair Chalmers, Emily Newnham, Joshua Faulds, Lina Nielsen	3:16.49	
4	1	Spain	Manuel Guijarro, Carmen Avilés, Bernat Erta, Daniela Fra	3:17.12	
5	2	Ireland	Conor Kelly, Phil Healy, Marcus Lawler, Sharlene Mawdsley	3:17.63	SB
6	3	Czech Republic	Michal Desenský, Marcela Pírková, Milan Ščibráni, Tereza Petržilková	3:19.17	
