= Isaya Klein Ikkink =

Dutch sprinter

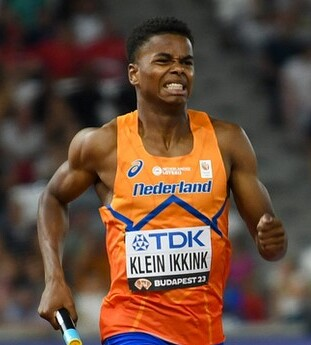
- Klein Ikkink during the mixed relay at the 2023 World Championships in Budapest

Personal information
- Born: 13 May 2003 (age 23) Vlaardingen, Netherlands

Sport
- Sport: Track and field
- Event: 400 m
- Club: Rotterdam Atletiek
- Turned pro: 2023

Achievements and titles
- Highest world ranking: No. 38 (400 m); No. 625 (overall)
- Personal bests: 60 m: 7.04 i (2023); 100 m: 10.87 (2022); 200 m: 21.30 (2024); 200 m sh: 21.77 i (2023); 400 m: 45.41 (2024); 400 m sh: 46.28 i (2023)
Medal record
Men's athletics
Representing Netherlands
Olympic Games
Gold medal – first place	2024 Paris	4 × 400 m mixed
World Indoor Championships
Bronze medal – third place	2024 Glasgow	4 × 400 m relay
World Athletics Relays
Silver medal – second place	2024 Nassau	4 × 400 m mixed
European Championships
Bronze medal – third place	2024 Rome	4 × 400 m mixed
European Indoor Championships
Gold medal – first place	2025 Apeldoorn	4 × 400 m relay
Bronze medal – third place	2023 Istanbul	4 × 400 m relay

Isaya Klein Ikkink (pronounced [iˈsaːjaː klɛin ˈɪkɪŋk]; born 13 May 2003) is a Dutch track and field athlete who competes in sprinting. He specializes in the 400 metres, where he has a personal best time of 45.41 seconds from 2024.

As part of the Dutch men's 4 × 400 metres relay team, he won bronze medals at the 2023 European Indoor Championships and the 2024 World Indoor Championships. As part of the Dutch mixed 4 × 400 metres relay team, he won a silver medal at the 2024 World Athletics Relays and a bronze medal at the 2024 European Championships. Klein Ikkink's highest World Athletics Rankings are No. 38 in the 400 metres and No. 625 of men overall.

== Early life ==
Klein Ikkink was born on 13 May 2003 in Vlaardingen, Netherlands.

== Career ==
=== 2023 ===
On 5 March, Klein Ikkink won a bronze medal at the 2023 European Indoor Championships in the 4 × 400 metres relay. On 19 August, he competed in the mixed 4 × 400 m relay at the 2023 World Championships in Budapest, Hungary, but the team did not finish.

=== 2024 ===
On 3 March, he won a bronze medal at the 2024 World Indoor Championships in the men's 4 × 400 m relay in Glasgow, United Kingdom. On 5 May, he won a silver medal at the 2024 World Athletics Relays in the mixed 4 × 400 m relay in Nassau, Bahamas. On 7 June, he won a bronze medal at the 2024 European Championships in the mixed 4 × 400 m relay. He had a split time of 44.68 s, which made him the second fastest male competitor in the mixed relay final, where Alexander Doom was the fastest.

He won a gold medal at the 2024 Summer Olympics in the mixed 4 × 400 metres relay.

== Personal bests ==
Information from his World Athletics profile unless otherwise noted.

=== Individual events ===
Personal best times for individual events
Event	Time	Location	Date	Notes
60 metres	7.04 i	Apeldoorn, Netherlands	28 January 2023	
100 metres	10.87	The Hague, Netherlands	15 May 2022	(Wind: +1.1 m/s)
200 metres	21.05	La Chaux-de-Fonds, Switzerland	14 July 2024	(Wind: +0.2 m/s)
200 metres short track	21.77 i	Metz, France	11 February 2023	
400 metres	45.28	Bellinzona, Switzerland	9 September 2024	
400 metres short track	45.96 i	Apeldoorn, Netherlands	16 February 2025	

=== Team events ===
Personal best times for team events
Type	Event	Time	Location	Date	Record	Notes
Men's	4 × 400 metres relay	3:00.23	Budapest, Hungary	26 August 2023		Teamed with Isayah Boers, Terrence Agard, and Ramsey Angela. Klein Ikkink ran the achor leg in a split time of 44.10 s.
Men's	4 × 400 metres short track relay	3:04.95 i	Apeldoorn, Netherlands	9 March 2025		Teamed with Eugene Omalla, Nick Smidt, and Tony van Diepen. Klein Ikkink ran the third leg in a split time of 46.08 s.
Mixed	4 × 400 metres relay	3:07.43	Saint-Denis, France	3 August 2024	AR	Teamed with Eugene Omalla, Lieke Klaver, and Femke Bol. Klein Ikkink ran the third leg in a split time of 44.91 s.

== Competition results ==
Information from his World Athletics profile unless otherwise noted.

=== World Athletics Rankings ===
Highest WA rankings per year
Year	400 m	Overall
2023		
2024	**84**	1441

Key: Lifetime best (in bold)

=== International competitions ===
Representing the Netherlands
Year	Competition	Venue	Position	Event	Time	Notes
2023	European Indoor Championships	Istanbul, Turkey	3rd in heat	400 m sh	46.74	
2023	European Indoor Championships	Istanbul, Turkey	3rd	4 × 400 m sh relay	3:06.59	
2023	European U23 Championships	Espoo, Finland	6th in heat	400 m	47.42	
2023	European U23 Championships	Espoo, Finland	–	4 × 400 m relay	DQ	
2023	World Championships	Budapest, Hungary	–	4 × 400 m mixed	DNF	(45.29 split)
2023	World Championships	Budapest, Hungary	6th	4 × 400 m relay	3:00.40	(44.10 split)
2024	World Indoor Championships	Glasgow, United Kingdom	3rd	4 × 400 m sh relay		
2024	World Relays	Nassau, Bahamas	2nd	4 × 400 m mixed	3:11.45	(45.23 split)
2024	European Championships	Rome, Italy	3rd	4 × 400 m mixed	3:10.73	(44.68 split)
2024	European Championships	Rome, Italy	9th (h)	4 × 400 m relay	3:03.50	
2024	Summer Olympics	Paris, France	1st	4 × 400 m mixed	3:07.43	AR
2025	European Indoor Championships	Apeldoorn, Netherlands	5th	400 m	46.20	
2025	European Indoor Championships	Apeldoorn, Netherlands	1st	4 × 400 m relay	3:04.95	
2025	European U23 Championships	Bergen, Norway	4th	4 × 400 m relay	3:02.89	

=== National championships ===
Representing Rotterdam Atletiek
Year	Competition	Venue	Position	Event	Time	Notes
2023	Dutch Indoor Championships	Apeldoorn, Netherlands	3rd	400 m sh	46.28 i	
2023	Dutch Championships	Breda, Netherlands	2nd	400 m	45.86	
2024	Dutch Indoor Championships	Apeldoorn, Netherlands	4th	400 m sh	47.09 i	
2025	Dutch Championships	Hengelo, Netherlands	5th	400 m	46.07	
