= 2022 World Athletics Indoor Championships – Men's 400 metres =

Men's 400 metres at the 2022 World Athletics Indoor Championships
- Venue: Štark Arena
- Dates: 18–19 March
- Competitors: 25 from 22 nations
- Winning time: 45.00

Medalists
| gold medal | Jereem Richards | Trinidad and Tobago |
| silver medal | Trevor Bassitt | United States |
| bronze medal | Carl Bengtström | Sweden |

The men's 400 metres at the 2022 World Athletics Indoor Championships took place on 18 and 19 March 2022.

== Summary ==
The top three sent-finalists are seeded into the outer three lanes. In a fast race on the tight turns of an indoor track, that is significant. Carl Bengtström, Jereem Richards and Trevor Bassitt won those honors. Running lanes for the first two turns, Richards seized a slight advantage over Bassitt, with Bengtström right on his heels. After the break, Richards cut sharply to the pole, cutting off Bassitt and seizing the lead. This forced Bassitt to try to figure out how to get past Richards while both were running at top speed. At first Bassitt entered the third turn in lane 2 to make space but couldn't see a way around. Through the penultimate straightaway, Bassit closed to just outside of Richards, gapping Bengtström. Bassitt ran high on the lane line through the final turn then drifted to lane three for running room to the finish line. As Bassitt closed ground with every step, Richards noticeably tightened and started leaning for the finish line almost 20 metres before the finish line. Both athletes leaned for the finish line, with Richards eking out a .05 victory.

After the race, Richards name checked Deon Lendore, who had been killed in a car crash two months earlier, for being a leader and inspiration. He wanted to "make him proud."

== Results ==
=== Heats ===
Qualification: First 2 in each heat (Q) and the next 2 fastest (q) advance to the Semi-Finals

The heats were started on 18 March at 11:00.

| Rank | Heat | Lane | Name | Nationality | Time | Notes |
|---|---|---|---|---|---|---|
| 1 | 1 | 6 | Julien Watrin | Belgium | 45.88 | Q, NR |
| 2 | 5 | 6 | Carl Bengtström | Sweden | 46.45 | Q |
| 3 | 1 | 5 | Trevor Bassitt | United States | 46.47 | Q |
| 4 | 5 | 4 | Christopher Taylor | Jamaica | 46.48 | Q |
| 5 | 5 | 5 | Bruno Hortelano | Spain | 46.49 | q |
| 6 | 3 | 5 | Patrik Šorm | Czech Republic | 46.49 | Q |
| 7 | 3 | 6 | Benjamin Lobo Vedel | Denmark | 46.58 | Q |
| 8 | 4 | 5 | Marqueze Washington | United States | 46.66 | Q |
| 9 | 2 | 5 | Jereem Richards | Trinidad and Tobago | 46.69 | Q |
| 10 | 2 | 4 | Mikhail Litvin | Kazakhstan | 46.72 | Q |
| 11 | 1 | 3 | Kajetan Duszyński | Poland | 46.75 | q |
| 12 | 3 | 4 | Patrick Schneider | Germany | 46.76 | |
| 13 | 3 | 3 | Tom Willems | Australia | 46.77 | |
| 14 | 4 | 4 | Boško Kijanović | Serbia | 46.88 | Q |
| 15 | 2 | 3 | Zakithi Nene | South Africa | 46.92 | |
| 16 | 5 | 3 | Håvard Bentdal Ingvaldsen | Norway | 46.95 | |
| 17 | 1 | 4 | Isayah Boers | Netherlands | 47.07 | |
| 18 | 4 | 3 | Pavel Maslák | Czech Republic | 47.31 | |
| 19 | 1 | 2 | Mazen Al-Yassin | Saudi Arabia | 47.65 | |
| 20 | 2 | 6 | Manuel Guijarro | Spain | 47.74 | |
| 21 | 4 | 2 | Jovan Stojoski | North Macedonia | 47.80 | |
| 22 | 2 | 2 | Pau Blasi | Andorra | 49.82 | |
| 23 | 3 | 2 | Quentin Petit | Comoros | 51.55 | SB |
| 24 | 5 | 2 | Malique Smith | United States Virgin Islands | 51.98 | SB |
| | 4 | 6 | Lucas Carvalho | Brazil | DQ | TR17.4.3 |

=== Semifinals ===
Qualification: First 3 in each heat (Q) advance to the Final

The heats were started on 18 March at 19:15.

| Rank | Heat | Lane | Name | Nationality | Time | Notes |
|---|---|---|---|---|---|---|
| 1 | 2 | 6 | Carl Bengtström | Sweden | 45.92 | Q |
| 2 | 1 | 4 | Jereem Richards | Trinidad and Tobago | 46.15 | Q |
| 3 | 2 | 4 | Trevor Bassitt | United States | 46.26 | Q |
| 4 | 1 | 3 | Benjamin Lobo Vedel | Denmark | 46.30 | Q |
| 5 | 1 | 5 | Marqueze Washington | United States | 46.36 | Q |
| 6 | 1 | 6 | Julien Watrin | Belgium | 46.54 | |
| 7 | 2 | 5 | Patrik Šorm | Czech Republic | 46.55 | Q |
| 8 | 2 | 1 | Bruno Hortelano | Spain | 46.76 | |
| 9 | 1 | 2 | Mikhail Litvin | Kazakhstan | 46.89 | |
| 10 | 2 | 2 | Boško Kijanović | Serbia | 46.97 | |
| 11 | 1 | 1 | Kajetan Duszyński | Poland | 47.21 | |
| | 2 | 3 | Christopher Taylor | Jamaica | DNF | |

=== Final ===
The final was started on 19 March at 20:15.

| Rank | Lane | Name | Nationality | Time | Notes |
|---|---|---|---|---|---|
| 1st place, gold medalist(s) | 6 | Jereem Richards | Trinidad and Tobago | 45.00 | CR NR |
| 2nd place, silver medalist(s) | 4 | Trevor Bassitt | United States | 45.05 | PB |
| 3rd place, bronze medalist(s) | 5 | Carl Bengtström | Sweden | 45.33 | NR |
| 4 | 3 | Benjamin Lobo Vedel | Denmark | 45.67 | NR |
| 5 | 2 | Patrik Šorm | Czech Republic | 46.81 | |
| 6 | 1 | Marqueze Washington | United States | 46.85 | |
