= Iñaki Cañal =

Spanish sprinter (born 1997)

Personal information
- Full name: Iñaki Cañal García
- Born: 30 September 1997 (age 28) Gijón, Asturias, Spain

Sport
- Sport: Athletics
- Event: 400 metres
- Club: Sociedad Gimnástica Pontevedra
- Coached by: Pedro Pablo Nolet
Medal record
Men's athletics
Representing Spain
World Indoor Championships
| Silver medal – second place | 2022 Belgrade | 4×400 m relay |

Iñaki Cañal García (Note: In this Spanish name, the first or paternal surname is Cañal and the second or maternal family name is García.) (born 30 September 1997) is a Spanish athlete specialising in the 400 metres.

== International competitions ==
| Year | Competition | Venue | Position | Event | Notes |
Representing Spain
| 2014 | European Youth Olympic Trials | Baku, Azerbaijan | 3rd | 200 m | 21.87 |
| 2015 | European Junior Championships | Eskilstuna, Sweden | - | 4 × 100 m relay | DQ |
| 2022 | World Indoor Championships | Belgrade, Serbia | 2nd | 4 × 400 m relay i | 3:06.82 |
| 2022 | Mediterranean Games | Oran, Algeria | 5th | 400 m | 46.44 |
| 2022 | Ibero-American Championships | La Nucía, Spain | 2nd | 4 × 400 m relay | 3:04.05 |
| 2022 | World Championships | Eugene, United States | 11th (h) | Mixed 4 × 400 m relay | 3:16.14 |
| 2022 | European Championships | Munich, Germany | 18th (sf) | 400 m | 46.10 |
| 2023 | European Indoor Championships | Istanbul, Turkey | (sf) | 400 m i | DNS |
| 2023 | European Games | Chorzów, Poland | 7th | 400 m | 45.51 |
| 2023 | European Games | Chorzów, Poland | 15th | Mixed 4 × 400 m relay | 3:16.79 |
| 2023 | World Championships | Budapest, Hungary | 15th (h) | 4 × 400 m relay | 3:02.64 |
| 2024 | World Relays | Nassau, Bahamas | 22nd (h) | 4 × 400 m relay | 3:06.84 |
| 2024 | European Championships | Rome, Italy | 5th | 4 × 400 m relay | 3:01.44 |
| 2024 | Olympic Games | Paris, France | 13th (h) | 4 × 400 m relay | 3:01.60 |
| 2025 | European Indoor Championships | Apeldoorn, Netherlands | 4th | 400 m i | 45.88 |
