= Kajetan Duszyński =

Polish sprinter (born 1995)

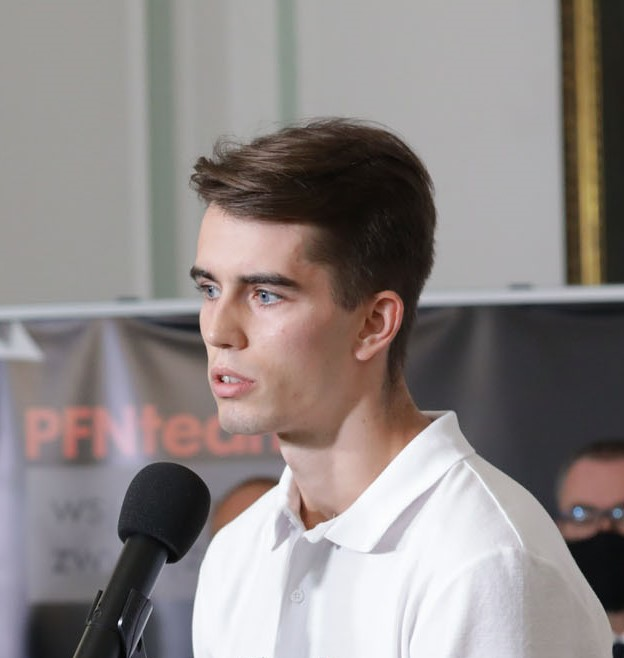
- Duszyński in 2021

Personal information
- Full name: Kajetan Patryk Duszyński
- Born: 12 May 1995 (age 31) Siemianowice Śląskie, Poland
- Education: Technical University of Łódź

Sport
- Sport: Athletics
- Event: 400 metres
- Club: TS AKS Chorzów (–2014); AZS Łódź (2014–)
- Coached by: Krzysztof Podchul (–2015); Krzysztof Węglarski (2015–)
Medal record
Men's athletics
Representing Poland
Olympic Games
Gold medal – first place	2020 Tokyo	4 × 400 m mixed
World Indoor Championships
Bronze medal – third place	2026 Toruń	Mixed 4x400 m
European Team Championships
Bronze medal – third place	2021 Chorzów	4 × 400 m relay
Summer Universiade
Bronze medal – third place	2019 Naples	4 × 400 m relay
European Athletics U23 Championships
Silver medal – second place	2015 Tallinn	4 × 400 m relay
Silver medal – second place	2017 Bydgoszcz	4 × 400 m relay
Polish Athletics Championships
Gold medal – first place	2021 Poznań	400 m
Silver medal – second place	2017 Białystok	400 m
Silver medal – second place	2022 Suwałki	400 m
Polish Indoor Athletics Championships
Gold medal – first place	2020 Toruń	400 m
Gold medal – first place	2022 Toruń	400 m

Kajetan Duszyński (Polish pronunciation: [kaˈjɛtan duˈʂɨj̃skʲi]; born 12 May 1995) is a Polish sprinter specialising in the 400 metres. He represented his country in the 4 × 400 metres relay at the 2017 World Championships reaching the final, as well in the mixed 4 × 400 metres relay at the 2020 Summer Olympics where Poland won gold medal. Duszyński also competed for Poland at the 2024 Summer Olympics.

== International competitions ==
Year	Competition	Venue	Position	Event	Notes
Representing Poland
2014	World Junior Championships	Eugene, United States	13th (h)	4 × 400 m relay	3:10.94
2015	European U23 Championships	Tallinn, Estonia	14th (h)	400 m	46.89
2015	European U23 Championships	Tallinn, Estonia	2nd	4 × 400 m relay	3:05.35
2017	European U23 Championships	Bydgoszcz, Poland	7th	400 m	46.80
2017	European U23 Championships	Bydgoszcz, Poland	2nd	4 × 400 m relay	3:04.22
2017	World Championships	London, United Kingdom	7th	4 × 400 m relay	3:01.59
2017	Universiade	Taipei, Taiwan	4th	400 m	46.50
2018
2018	European Championships	Berlin, Germany	5th	4 × 400 m relay	3:02.27
2019	World Relays	Yokohama, Japan	7th (B)	4 × 400 m relay	3:05.91
2019	Universiade	Naples, Italy	3rd	4 × 400 m relay	3:03.35
2021	European Indoor Championships	Toruń, Poland	12th (sf)	400 m	47.26
2021	World Relays	Chorzów, Poland	9th (h)	4 × 400 m relay	3:05.04
2021	Olympic Games	Tokyo, Japan	5th	4 × 400 m relay	2:58.46
2021	Olympic Games	Tokyo, Japan	1st	4 × 400 m mixed relay	3:09.87 OR
2022	World Indoor Championships	Belgrade, Serbia	11th (sf)	400 m	47.21
2022	World Indoor Championships	Belgrade, Serbia	4th	4 × 400 m relay	3:07.81
2022	World Championships	Eugene, United States	32nd (h)	400 m	46.57
2022	World Championships	Eugene, United States	9th	4 × 400 m relay	3:02.51
2023	European Indoor Championships	Istanbul, Turkey	10th (sf)	400 m	47.01
2024
2024	European Championships	Rome, Italy	–	4 × 400 m relay	DQ
2024	Olympic Games	Paris, France	12th (h)	4 × 400 m relay	3:01.21
2026
2026	European Championships	Birmingham, United Kingdom	6th	4 × 400 m relay	3:00.56

== Personal bests ==
Outdoor

- 200 metres – 22.02 (-0.3 m/s, Łódź 2017)
- 400 metres – 44.92 (Bern 2021)

Indoor

- 400 metres – 47.84 (Spała 2016)
