= 2022 World Athletics Indoor Championships – Men's 4 × 400 metres relay =

Men's 4 × 400 metres relay at the 2022 World Athletics Indoor Championships
- Venue: Štark Arena
- Dates: 20 March
- Competitors: 56 from 13 nations
- Winning time: 3:06.52

Medalists
gold medal	Julien Watrin; Alexander Doom; Jonathan Sacoor; Kevin Borlée; Dylan Borlée	Belgium
silver medal	Bruno Hortelano; Iñaki Cañal; Manuel Guijarro; Bernat Erta	Spain
bronze medal	Taymir Burnet; Nick Smidt; Terrence Agard; Tony van Diepen; Isayah Boers; Jochem Dobber	Netherlands

The men's 4 × 400 metres relay at the 2022 World Athletics Indoor Championships took place on 20 March 2022.

== Summary ==
Belgium, Spain and the Netherlands won their respective heats and qualified for the final automatically, with Spain clocking the fastest time. US anchor leg runner Isaiah Harris suffered an injury during the last lap and, despite finishing in second place, the US team did not make the final for the first time in the history of the World Athletics Indoor Championships. The Czech Republic, Poland and Great Britain were the next three fastest teams to make the final. This marked the first time in the history of the World Athletics Indoor Championships that the men's 4x400m relay final consisted entirely of European teams.

Spain was in the lead for the first two legs, with Belgium following closely behind. At the second exchange, Jonathan Sacoor got the baton in the first place, with Spain and Great Britain in second and third, respectively. Terrence Agard of the Netherlands, having received the baton in the fifth place, quickly made up ground on the leading teams and was at the front with the leader by the end of the first lap. On the back straight a gap opened up in lane one, which was quickly taken up by the accelerating Manuel Guijarro, immediately putting Spain back in the lead. At the final hand-off it was Spain, followed by Belgium and Great Britain. Spain's Bernat Erta quickly opened up a sizeable lead on the Belgium's veteran Kevin Borlée, but, in an exact replay of the events from three years ago at the 2019 European Indoor Championships in Glasgow, was overtaken by the more experienced Belgian with 100m to go. Belgium won their first World Indoor title in the event, Spain held on for silver and the accelerating Tony van Diepen secured bronze for the Netherlands. The defending champions Poland finished in fourth place.

== Results ==
=== Heats ===
Qualification: First 1 in each heat (Q) and the next 3 fastest (q) advance to the Final.

The heats were started at 11:10.

Rank	Heat	Lane	Country	Athletes	Time	Notes
1	2	6	Spain	Bruno Hortelano, Iñaki Cañal, Manuel Guijarro, Bernat Erta	3:06.98	Q, SB
2	2	5	Czech Republic	Pavel Maslák, Vít Müller, Tadeáš Plaček, Patrik Šorm	3:07.25	q, SB
3	1	5	Belgium	Julien Watrin, Dylan Borlée, Alexander Doom, Kevin Borlée	3:07.43	Q, SB
4	3	6	Netherlands	Isayah Boers, Nick Smidt, Jochem Dobber, Tony van Diepen	3:07.64	Q, SB
5	3	4	Poland	Tymoteusz Zimny, Mateusz Rzeźniczak, Jacek Majewski, Kajetan Duszyński	3:07.90	q, SB
6	3	5	Great Britain	Alex Haydock-Wilson, Ben Higgins, Samuel Reardon, Guy Learmonth	3:08.30	q, SB
7	2	4	Ireland	Cillin Greene, Cathal Crosbie, Brian Gregan, Christopher O'Donnell	3:08.63	NR
8	1	6	United States	Noah Williams, Donavan Brazier, Amere Lattin, Isaiah Harris	3:09.11	SB
9	1	4	Sweden	Kasper Kadestål, Nick Ekelund-Arenander, Karl Wållgren, Erik Martinsson	3:09.48	SB
10	1	3	Nigeria	Ifeanyi Ojeli, Sikiru Adeyemi, Timothy Emeoghene, Samson Nathaniel	3:09.55	SB
11	2	3	Slovakia	Šimon Bujna, Patrik Dömötör, Matej Baluch, Miroslav Marček	3:09.79	NR
12	3	3	Romania	Remus Niculita, Mihai Dringo, Denis Toma, Robert Parge	3:13.11	
	1	2	Ecuador	Katriel Angulo, Alan Minda, Anderson Marquinez, Steeven Salas	DQ	TR17.4.3

=== Final ===
Final was started at 19:40.

Rank	Lane	Country	Athletes	Time	Notes
1st place, gold medalist(s)	5	Belgium	Julien Watrin, Alexander Doom, Jonathan Sacoor, Kevin Borlée	3:06.52	SB
2nd place, silver medalist(s)	6	Spain	Bruno Hortelano, Iñaki Cañal, Manuel Guijarro, Bernat Erta	3:06.82	SB
3rd place, bronze medalist(s)	3	Netherlands	Taymir Burnet, Nick Smidt, Terrence Agard, Tony van Diepen	3:06.90	SB
4	1	Poland	Tymoteusz Zimny, Mateusz Rzeźniczak, Maksymilian Klepacki, Kajetan Duszyński	3:07.81	SB
5	4	Czech Republic	Patrik Šorm, Vít Müller, Tadeáš Plaček, Pavel Maslák	3:07.98	
6	2	Great Britain	Ben Higgins, Alex Haydock-Wilson, Samuel Reardon, Guy Learmonth	3:08.30	SB
