= 2023 European Athletics Indoor Championships – Men's 400 metres =

Men's 400 metres at the 2023 European Athletics Indoor Championships
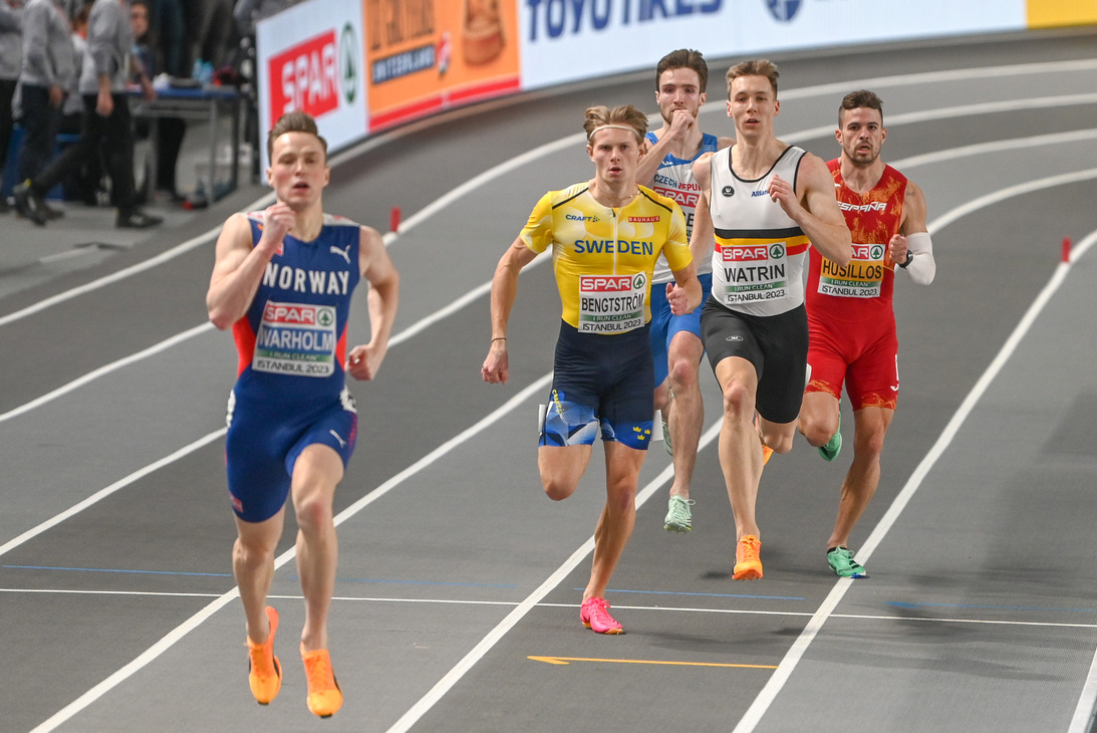
- The final underway.
- Venue: Ataköy Athletics Arena
- Location: Istanbul, Turkey
- Dates: 3 March 2023 (round 1 and semi-finals); 4 March 2023 (final)
- Competitors: 25 from 17 nations
- Winning time: 45.35

Medalists
gold medal	Karsten Warholm	Norway
silver medal	Julien Watrin	Belgium
bronze medal	Carl Bengtström	Sweden

The men's 400 metres event at the 2023 European Athletics Indoor Championships was held on 3 March 2023 at 09:50 (heats), on 3 March at 19:35 (semi-finals), and on 4 March at 20:20 (final) local time.

== Records ==
Standing records prior to the 2023 European Athletics Indoor Championships
World record	Kerron Clement (USA)	44.57	Fayetteville, United States	12 March 2005
European record	Thomas Schönlebe (GDR)	45.05	Sindelfingen, West Germany	5 February 1988
European record	Karsten Warholm (NOR)	45.05	Glasgow, United Kingdom	2 March 2019
Championship record	Karsten Warholm (NOR)	45.05	Glasgow, United Kingdom	2 March 2019
World Leading	Elija Godwin (USA)	44.75	Fayetteville, United States	25 February 2023
European Leading	Karsten Warholm (NOR)	45.31	Ulsteinvik, Norway	2 February 2023

== Results ==
=== Heats ===
Qualification: First 2 in each heat (Q) and the next 2 fastest (q) advance to the Semifinals.

Rank	Heat	Athlete	Nationality	Time	Note
1	1	Karsten Warholm	Norway	45.75	Q
2	4	Matěj Krsek	Czech Republic	46.23	Q
3	2	Iñaki Cañal	Spain	46.26	Q
4	2	Alexander Doom	Belgium	46.26	Q
5	4	Óscar Husillos	Spain	46.28	Q
6	5	Julien Watrin	Belgium	46.41	Q
7	3	Gilles Biron	France	46.50	Q
8	4	João Coelho	Portugal	46.51	q
9	1	Carl Bengtström	Sweden	46.55	Q
10	4	Kajetan Duszyński	Poland	46.66	q
11	3	Isayah Boers	Netherlands	46.72	Q
12	2	Isaya Klein Ikkink	Netherlands	46.74	
13	1	Lionel Spitz	Switzerland	46.79	
14	1	Vladimir Aceti	Italy	46.80	
15	5	Liemarvin Bonevacia	Netherlands	46.87	Q
16	4	Gustav Lundholm Nielsen	Denmark	46.93	
17	3	Marvin Schlegel	Germany	47.01	
18	3	Andreas Grimerud	Norway	47.04	
19	1	Mihai Sorin Dringo	Romania	47.06	
20	5	Ricky Petrucciani	Switzerland	47.32	
21	5	Boško Kijanović	Serbia	47.36	
22	2	Muhammad Abdallah Kounta	France	47.55	
23	2	Iļja Petrušenko	Latvia	47.95	
24	3	Robert Parge	Romania	49.67	
25	5	Manuel Guijarro	Spain	49.77	

=== Semifinals ===
Qualification: First 3 in each heat (Q) advance to the Final.

Rank	Heat	Athlete	Nationality	Time	Note
1	2	Karsten Warholm	Norway	45.43	Q
2	1	Carl Bengtström	Sweden	45.77	Q, SB
3	2	Julien Watrin	Belgium	45.82	Q, NR
4	2	Óscar Husillos	Spain	45.86	Q
5	1	Matěj Krsek	Czech Republic	46.03	Q, PB
6	1	Alexander Doom	Belgium	46.12	Q
7	1	Liemarvin Bonevacia	Netherlands	46.60	
8	1	João Coelho	Portugal	46.69	
9	2	Gilles Biron	France	46.71	
10	2	Kajetan Duszyński	Poland	47.01	
11	2	Isayah Boers	Netherlands	47.39	
	1	Iñaki Cañal	Spain	DNS	

=== Final ===
Rank	Lane	Athlete	Nationality	Time	Note
1st place, gold medalist(s)	6	Karsten Warholm	Norway	45.35	
2nd place, silver medalist(s)	4	Julien Watrin	Belgium	45.44	NR
3rd place, bronze medalist(s)	5	Carl Bengtström	Sweden	45.77	
4	2	Óscar Husillos	Spain	46.24	
5	3	Matěj Krsek	Czech Republic	46.48	
	1	Alexander Doom	Belgium	DNS	
