= 2023 European Athletics Indoor Championships – Men's 4 × 400 metres relay =

Men's 4 × 400 metres relay at the 2023 European Athletics Indoor Championships
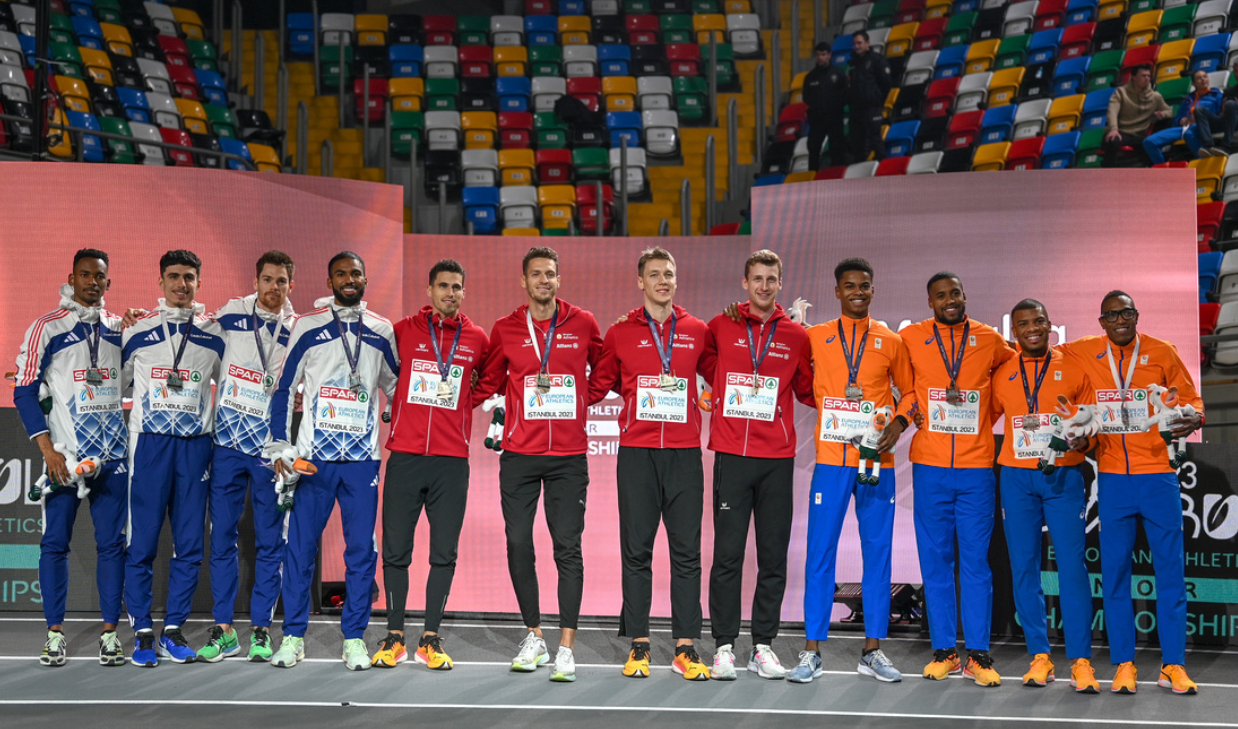
- Medalists from France, Belgium, and the Netherlands
- Venue: Ataköy Athletics Arena
- Location: Istanbul, Turkey
- Dates: 5 March 2023 (final)
- Teams: 6 nations
- Winning time: 3:05.83 EL

Medalists
gold medal	Dylan Borlée; Alexander Doom; Kevin Borlée; Julien Watrin	Belgium
silver medal	Gilles Biron; Téo Andant; Victor Coroller; Muhammad Abdallah Kounta	France
bronze medal	Isayah Boers; Isaya Klein Ikkink; Ramsey Angela; Liemarvin Bonevacia	Netherlands

The men's 4 × 400 metres relay event at the 2023 European Athletics Indoor Championships was held on 5 March 2023 at 19:10 (final) local time.

== Records ==
Standing records prior to the 2023 European Athletics Indoor Championships
World record	United States (USA)	3:01.51	Clemson, United States	9 February 2019
European record	Poland (POL)	3:01.77	Birmingham, United Kingdom	4 March 2018
Championship record	Belgium (BEL)	3:02.87	Prague, Czech Republic	8 March 2015
World Leading	(United States) Arkansas	3:01.09	Albuquerque, United States	4 February 2023
European Leading	Hungary (HUN)	3:08.58	Nyíregyháza, Hungary	28 January 2023

== Results ==
Spain led most of the way but ended up finishing in fourth. Their young 18-year-old anchor, the 400m world indoor junior champion, was overtaken at the very end, specifically on the very last bend.

Rank	Nationality	Athlete	Time	Notes
1st place, gold medalist(s)	Belgium	Dylan Borlée; Alexander Doom; Kevin Borlée; Julien Watrin	3:05.83	EL
2nd place, silver medalist(s)	France	Gilles Biron; Téo Andant; Victor Coroller; Muhammad Abdallah Kounta	3:06.52	SB
3rd place, bronze medalist(s)	Netherlands	Isayah Boers; Isaya Klein Ikkink; Ramsey Angela; Liemarvin Bonevacia	3:06.59	SB
4	Spain	Óscar Husillos; Markel Fernández; Lucas Búa; David García	3:06.87	SB
5	Great Britain	Ben Higgins; Joseph Brier; Samuel Reardon; Lewis Davey	3:08.61	SB
6	Turkey	Oğuzhan Kaya; Berke Akçam; Kubilay Ençü; Ismail Nezir	3:09.41	NR
