= 2019 European Athletics Indoor Championships – Men's 4 × 400 metres relay =

The men's 4 × 400 metres relay event at the 2019 European Athletics Indoor Championships was held on 3 March 2019 at 20:25 (final) local time.

== Records ==
| World record | Poland (POL) | 3:01.77 | Birmingham, United Kingdom | 4 March 2018 |
| European record | Poland (POL) | 3:01.77 | Birmingham, United Kingdom | 4 March 2018 |
| Championship record | Belgium (BEL) | 3:02.87 | Prague, Czech Republic | 8 March 2015 |
| World Leading | (United States) Houston | 3:01.51 | Clemson, United States | 9 February 2019 |
| European Leading | | | | |

== Results ==
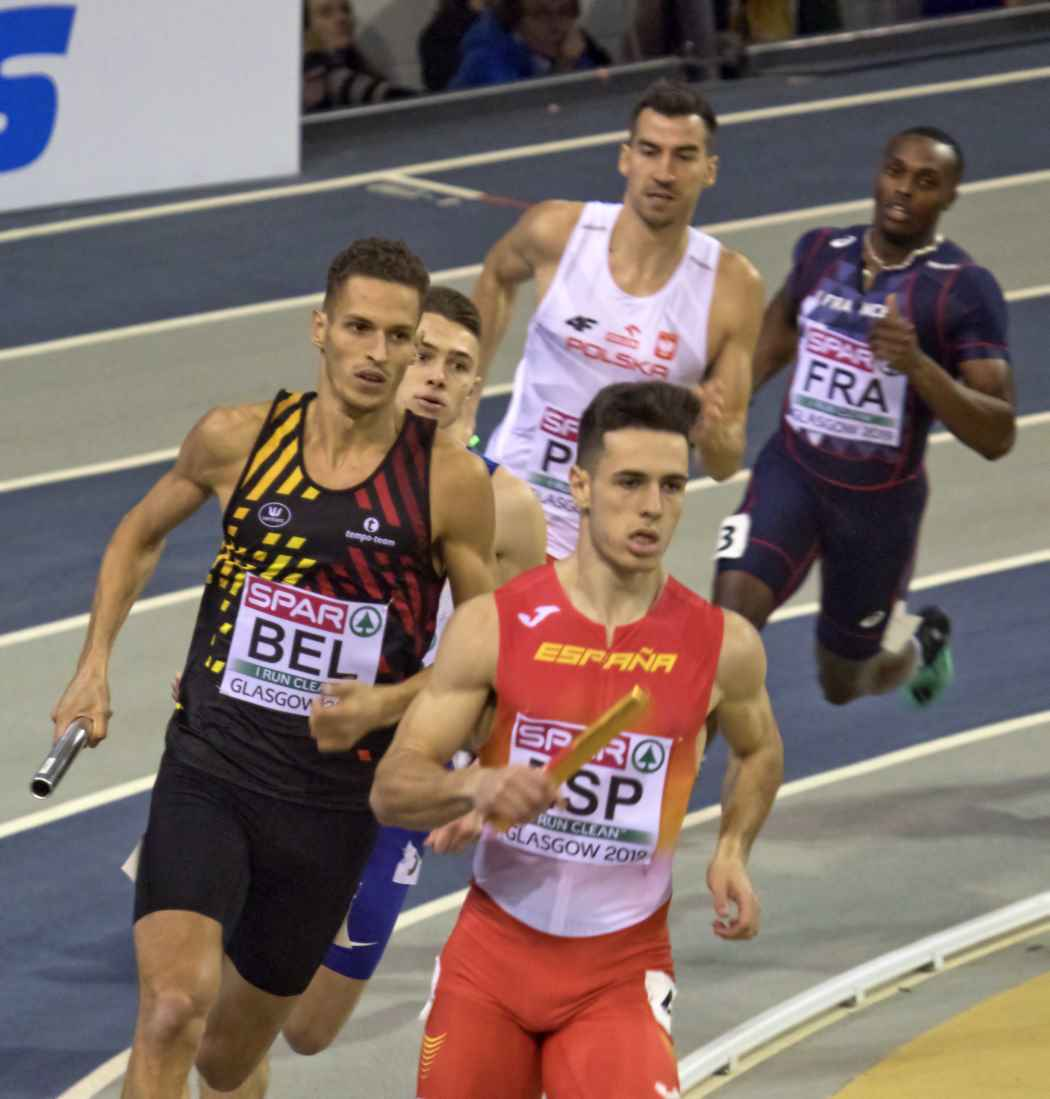
2nd leg

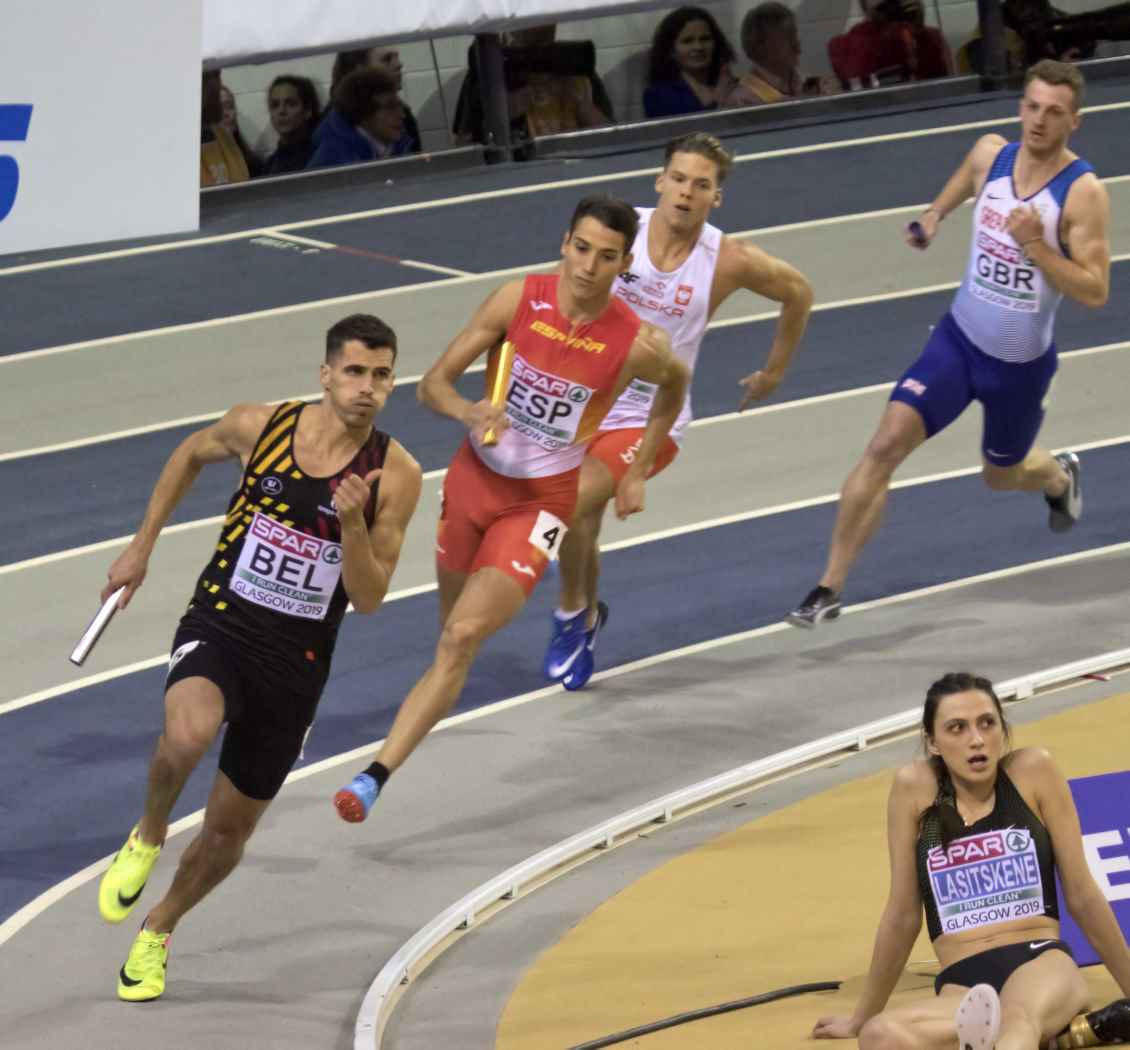
3rd leg

| Rank | Nationality | Athlete | Time | Notes |
|---|---|---|---|---|
| 1st place, gold medalist(s) | Belgium | Julien Watrin; Dylan Borlée; Jonathan Borlée; Kevin Borlée | 3:06.27 | |
| 2nd place, silver medalist(s) | Spain | Óscar Husillos; Manuel Guijarro; Lucas Búa; Bernat Erta | 3:06.32 | NR |
| 3rd place, bronze medalist(s) | France | Mame-Ibra Anne; Thomas Jordier; Nicolas Courbiere; Fabrisio Saidy | 3:07.71 | |
| 4 | Poland | Dariusz Kowaluk; Rafał Omelko; Tymoteusz Zimny; Damian Czykier | 3:08.40 | |
| 5 | Great Britain | Cameron Chalmers; Joe Brier; Thomas Somers; Alex Haydock-Wilson | 3:08.48 | |
| 6 | Italy | Giuseppe Leonardi; Michele Tricca; Brayan Lopez; Vladimir Aceti | 3:09.48 | |
