= Óscar Husillos =

Spanish sprinter (born 1993)

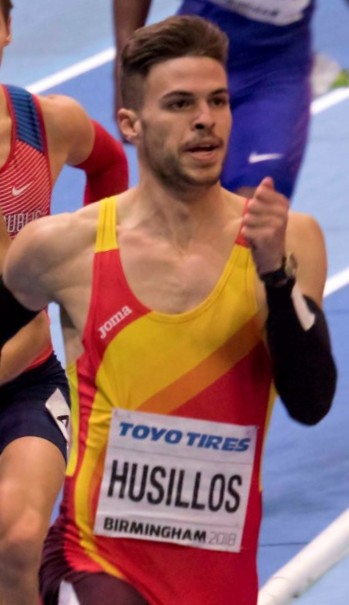
- Óscar Husillos in 2018

Personal information
- Full name: Óscar Husillos Domingo
- Born: 18 July 1993 (age 32) Palencia, Spain
- Height: 1.80 m (5 ft 11 in)
- Weight: 66 kg (146 lb)

Sport
- Country: Spain
- Sport: Athletics
- Events: 200 metres, 400 metres
- Club: C.A. Adidas
- Coached by: Luis Ángel Caballero
Medal record
Men's athletics
Representing Spain
European Championships
Bronze medal – third place	2018 Berlin	4 × 400 m relay
European Indoor Championships
Gold medal – first place	2021 Torun	400 m
Silver medal – second place	2019 Glasgow	400 m
Silver medal – second place	2019 Glasgow	4 × 400 m relay
Silver medal – second place	2025 Apeldoorn	4 × 400 m relay

Óscar Husillos Domingo (born 18 July 1993) is a Spanish sprinter specialising in the 200 and 400 metres. He won the gold medal in the 400 m at the 2021 European Indoor Championships and a silver at the 2019 European Indoor Championships.

Husillos is the Spanish indoor record holder for the 300 m and 400 m, and a former record holder for the 200 m. He has won a total of 17 national titles, between outdoors and indoors.

During the final of the 2018 World Indoor Championships 400 m he ran a time of 44.92s, which would have been a European Record and tied for sixth on the all-time list. But ultimately, he got disqualified after very slightly stepping over the adjacent lane.

== Achievements ==
=== International competitions ===
Representing Spain
Year	Competition	Venue	Position	Event	Time
2012	World Junior Championships	Barcelona, Spain	22nd (h)	200 m	21.82
2012	World Junior Championships	Barcelona, Spain	17th (h)	4 × 100 m relay	41.08
2014	IAAF World Relays	Nassau, Bahamas	–	4 × 200 m relay	DQ
2014	Mediterranean U23 Championships	Aubagne, France	6th	200 m	21.75
2016	European Championships	Amsterdam, Netherlands	9th (h)	4 × 100 m relay	39.15
2017	European Indoor Championships	Belgrade, Serbia	9th (sf)	400 m i	47.83
2017	European Team Championships Super League	Lille, France	8th	200 m	20.97
2017	European Team Championships Super League	Lille, France	1st	4 × 400 m relay	3:02.32
2017	World Championships	London, United Kingdom	14th (sf)	400 m	45.16
2017	World Championships	London, United Kingdom	5th	4 × 400 m relay	3:00.65
2018	World Indoor Championships	Birmingham, United Kingdom	1st (sf)	400 m i	45.69^{1}
2018	European Championships	Berlin, Germany	6th	400 m	45.61
2018	European Championships	Berlin, Germany	3rd	4 × 400 m relay	3:00.78
2019	European Indoor Championships	Glasgow, United Kingdom	2nd	400 m i	45.66
2019	European Indoor Championships	Glasgow, United Kingdom	2nd	4 × 400 m relay i	3:06.32
2019	European Team Championships Super League	Bydgoszcz, Poland	3rd	400 m	46.36
2019	European Team Championships Super League	Bydgoszcz, Poland	4th	4 × 400 m relay	3:04.52
2019	World Championships	Doha, Qatar	14th (h)	4 × 400 m relay	3:04.27
2021	European Indoor Championships	Toruń, Poland	1st	400 m i	46.22
2021	World Relays	Chorzów, Poland	13th (h)	4 × 400 m relay	3:06.09
2021	Olympic Games	Tokyo, Japan	43rd (h)	400 m	48.05
2022	Ibero-American Championships	La Nucía, Spain	2nd	4 × 400 m relay	3:04.05
2022	World Championships	Eugene, OR, United States	11th (h)	Mixed 4 × 400 m relay	3:16.14
2022	European Championships	Munich, Germany	24th (h)	400 m	46.42
2022	European Championships	Munich, Germany	4th	4 × 400 m relay	3:00.54
2023	European Indoor Championships	Istanbul, Turkey	4th	400 m i	46.24
2023	European Indoor Championships	Istanbul, Turkey	4th	4 × 400 m relay i	3:06.87
2023	European Games	Chorzów, Poland	15th	Mixed 4 × 400 m relay	3:16.79
2023	World Championships	Budapest, Hungary	15th (h)	4 × 400 m relay	3:02.64
2024	European Championships	Rome, Italy	5th	4 × 400 m relay	3:01.44
2024	Olympic Games	Paris, France	13th (h)	4 × 400 m relay	3:01.60
2025	European Indoor Championships	Apeldoorn, Netherlands	27th (h)	400 m i	47.95
2025	European Indoor Championships	Apeldoorn, Netherlands	2nd	4 × 400 m relay	3:05.18

^{1}Disqualified in the final

=== Personal bests ===
- 200 metres – 20.74 (+0.3 m/s, Guadalajara 2018)
  - 200 metres indoor – 20.68 (Valencia 2018) NR
- 300 metres – 33.00 (Palencia 2018)
  - 300 metres indoor – 32.39 (Salamanca 2018) NB
- 400 metres – 44.73 (Madrid 2018)
  - 400 metres indoor – 45.58 (Madrid 2023) NR

=== National titles ===
- Spanish Athletics Championships
  - 200 metres: 2016
  - 400 metres: 2017, 2018, 2019, 2021, 2022, 2023, 2024
  - 4 × 400 m relay: 2017
- Spanish Indoor Athletics Championships
  - 200 metres: 2014, 2016, 2018
  - 400 metres: 2017, 2019, 2021, 2023, 2024
