= Julien Watrin =

Belgian sprinter (born 1992)

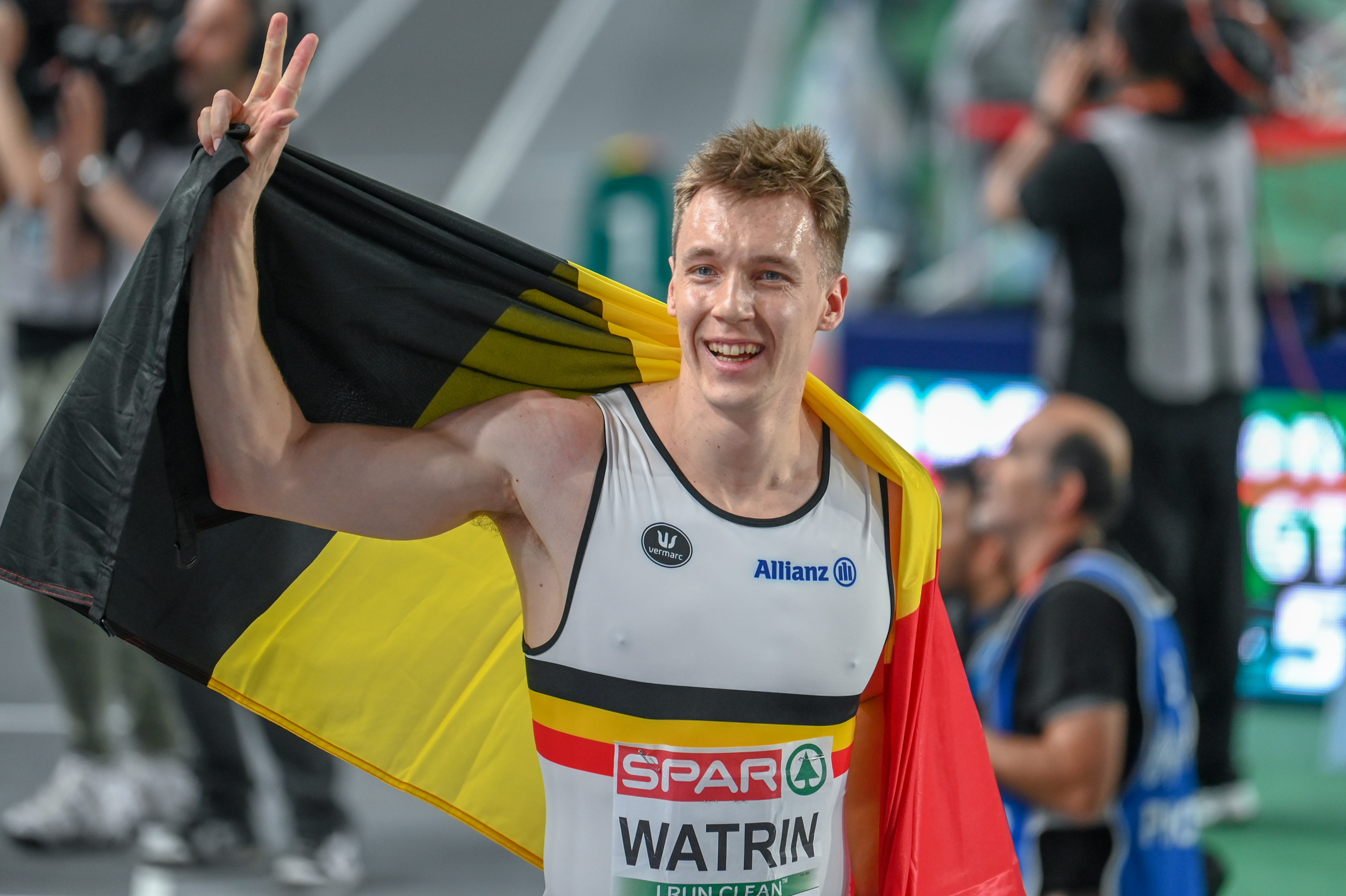
- Watrin at the 2023 European Indoor Championships in Istanbul

Personal information
- Born: 27 June 1992 (age 34) Virton, Belgium
- Height: 1.87 m (6 ft 2 in)
- Weight: 82 kg (181 lb)

Sport
- Country: Belgium
- Sport: Athletics
- Events: 400 metres, 400 m hurdles
- Club: AC Dampicourt
- Coached by: Edith Graff
Medal record
Men's athletics
Representing Belgium
International competitions
Event	1st	2nd	3rd
World Championships	0	0	2
World Indoor Championships	2	1	0
European Indoor Championships	2	1	0
European Championships	3	3	1
World Relays	0	0	2
Total	7	5	5
World Championships
Bronze medal – third place	2019 Doha	4 × 400 m relay
Bronze medal – third place	2022 Eugene	4 × 400 m relay
World Indoor Championships
Gold medal – first place	2022 Belgrade	4 × 400 m relay
Gold medal – first place	2026 Toruń	4 × 400 m mixed
Silver medal – second place	2026 Toruń	4 × 400 m relay
World Relays
Bronze medal – third place	2015 Nassau	4 × 400 m relay
Bronze medal – third place	2019 Yokohama	4 × 400 m relay
European Championships
Gold medal – first place	2016 Amsterdam	4 × 400 m relay
Gold medal – first place	2018 Berlin	4 × 400 m relay
Silver medal – second place	2022 Munich	4 × 400 m relay
European Indoor Championships
Gold medal – first place	2015 Prague	4 × 400 m relay
Gold medal – first place	2019 Glasgow	4 × 400 m relay
Gold medal – first place	2023 Istanbul	4 × 400 m relay
Silver medal – second place	2017 Belgrade	4 × 400 m relay
Silver medal – second place	2023 Istanbul	400 m
Silver medal – second place	2025 Apeldoorn	4 × 400 m mixed
Bronze medal – third place	2025 Apeldoorn	4 × 400 m relay

Julien Watrin (born 27 June 1992) is a Belgian sprinter specialising in the 400 metres. In 2023, he won his first individual major senior medal, with silver at the European Indoor Championships. Watrin earned several major medals with national men's 4 × 400 m relays, including bronzes at the 2019 and 2022 World Athletics Championships.

== Career ==
He is the Belgian record holder for the 400 m hurdles, Belgian indoor record holder for the 400 m, and won several national titles.

He was diagnosed with testicular cancer in September 2023 which prevented him from participating in the 2024 Summer Olympics in Paris, France. After successful treatment, he made his return on the international stage at the 2025 European Athletics Indoor Championships in Apeldoorn, The Netherlands, winning a silver medal as a member of Belgium's 4 × 400 m mixed relay team and a bronze medal as a member of Belgium's men 4 × 400 m relay team.

In March 2026, he was selected for the relays at the 2026 World Athletics Indoor Championships in Poland. On the second day of competition, on 21 March, he won the gold medal in the first ever indoor mixed 4 × 400 metres relay running alongside Ilana Hanssens, Jonathan Sacoor and Helena Ponette Their time of 3:15.60 was the fastest short track performance recorded for the event. One day later, on 22 March, he won a silver medal in the men's 4 × 400 metres relay running alongside Christian Iguacel, Jonathan Sacoor and Alexander Doom.

== Statistics ==
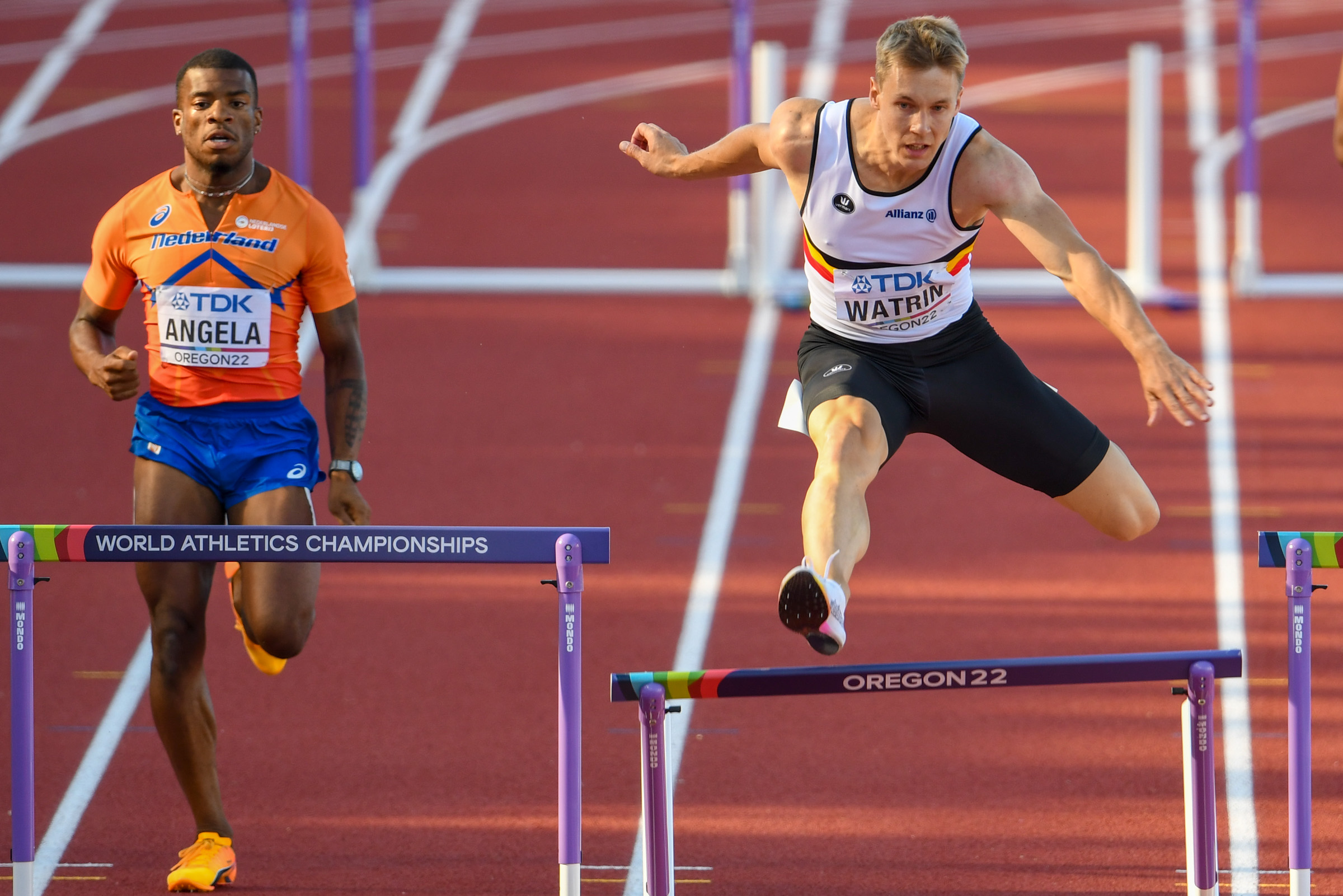
Watrin reached the semi-finals in the 400 m hurdles at the 2022 World Athletics Championships in Eugene.

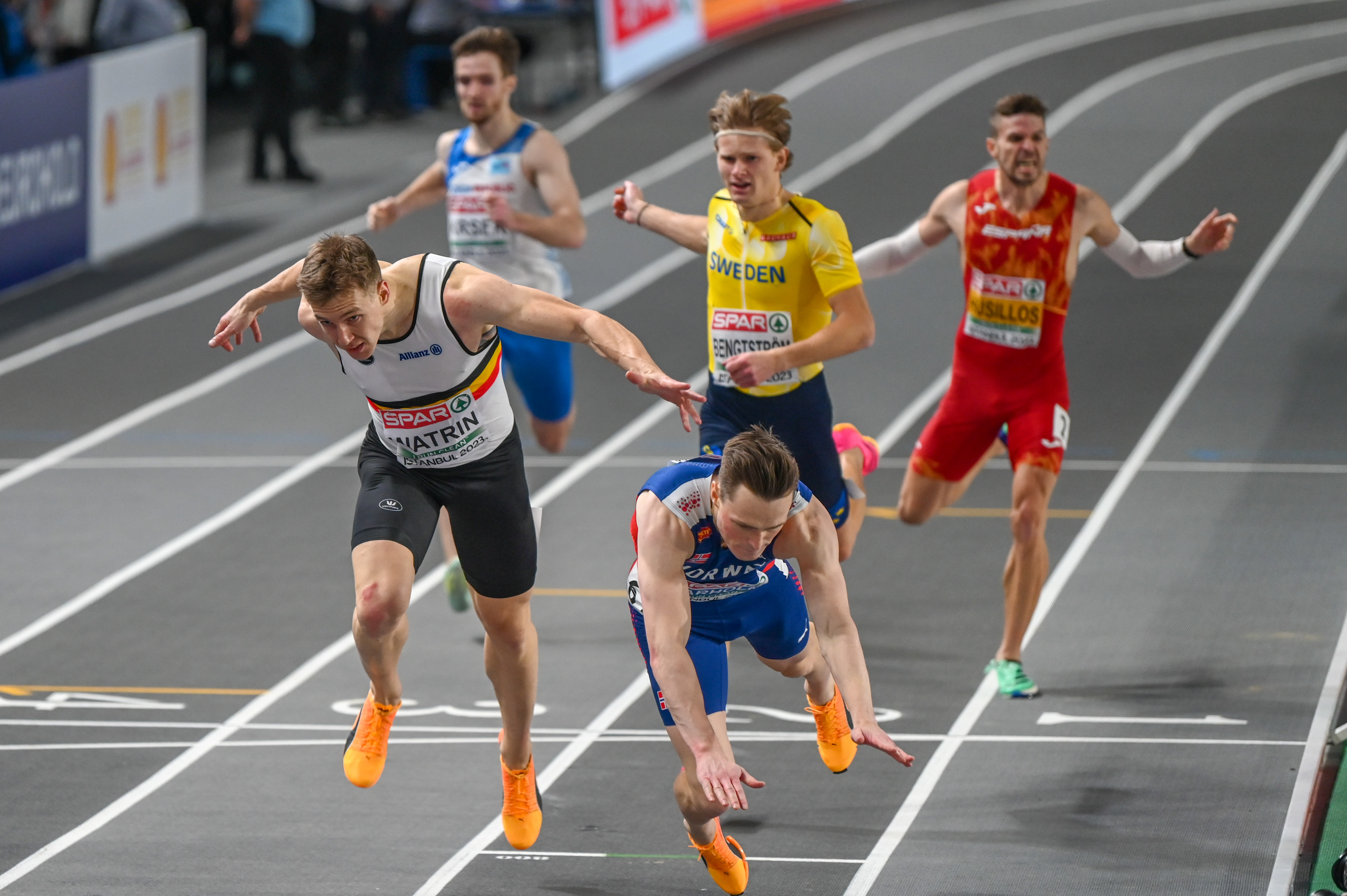
Julien Watrin narrowly lost to Karsten Warholm in winning his first individual major senior medal in the 400 m final at the 2023 European Indoor Championships in Istanbul.

=== International competitions ===
Representing Belgium
Year	Competition	Venue	Position	Event	Time
2009	European Youth Olympic Festival	Tampere, Finland	2nd	100 m	10.82
2009	European Youth Olympic Festival	Tampere, Finland	1st	200 m	21.06
2009	European Youth Olympic Festival	Tampere, Finland	3rd	4 × 100 m relay	41.69
2010	World Junior Championships	Moncton, Canada	7th	100 m	10.56
2010	World Junior Championships	Moncton, Canada	9th (sf)	200 m	21.12 w
2010	World Junior Championships	Moncton, Canada	13th (h)	4 × 100 m relay	40.43
2011	European Junior Championships	Tallinn, Estonia	–	200 m	DNF
2013	European U23 Championships	Tampere, Finland	1st	4 × 400 m relay	3:04.90
2013	Jeux de la Francophonie	Nice, France	4th	200 m	21.56
2013	Jeux de la Francophonie	Nice, France	3rd	4 × 100 m relay	39.58
2014	World Relays	Nassau, Bahamas	1st (B)	4 × 400 m relay	3:02.97
2014	European Championships	Zürich, Switzerland	23rd (h)	400 m	46.31
2014	European Championships	Zürich, Switzerland	7th	4 × 400 m relay	3:02.60
2015	European Indoor Championships	Prague, Czech Republic	1st	4 × 400 m relay	3:02.87 WL AR
2015	World Relays	Nassau, Bahamas	3rd	4 × 400 m relay	2:59.33
2016	European Championships	Amsterdam, Netherlands	10th (sf)	400 m	45.76
2016	European Championships	Amsterdam, Netherlands	1st	4 × 400 m relay	3:01.10
2016	Olympic Games	Rio de Janeiro, Brazil	4th	4 × 400 m relay	2:58.52
2017	European Indoor Championships	Belgrade, Serbia	2nd	4 × 400 m relay	3:07.80
2017	World Relays	Nassau, Bahamas	2nd (B)	4 × 400 m relay	3:07.14
2018	European Championships	Berlin, Germany	4th (h)	4 × 400 m relay	3:02.55
2019	European Indoor Championships	Glasgow, United Kingdom	1st	4 × 400 m relay	3:06.27
2019	World Relays	Yokohama, Japan	8th (h)	4 × 400 m relay	3:03.70
2019	World Championships	Doha, Qatar	3rd (h)	4 × 400 m relay	3:00.87
2022	World Indoor Championships	Belgrade, Serbia	6th (sf)	400 m	46.54
2022	World Indoor Championships	Belgrade, Serbia	1st	4 × 400 m relay	3:06.52
2022	World Championships	Eugene, OR, United States	14th (sf)	400 m hurdles	49.52
2022	World Championships	Eugene, OR, United States	3rd	4 × 400 m relay	2:58.72
2022	European Championships	Munich, Germany	6th	400 m hurdles	48.98
2022	European Championships	Munich, Germany	2nd	4 × 400 m relay	2:59.49
2023	European Indoor Championships	Istanbul, Turkey	2nd	400 m	45.44
2023	European Indoor Championships	Istanbul, Turkey	1st	4 × 400 m relay	3:05.83
2023	World Championships	Budapest, Hungary	17th (sf)	400 m hurdles	48.94
2023	World Championships	Budapest, Hungary	9th (h)	4 × 400 m relay	3:00.33
2025	European Indoor Championships	Apeldoorn, Netherlands	2nd	4 × 400 m mixed	3:16.19
2025	European Indoor Championships	Apeldoorn, Netherlands	3rd	4 × 400 m relay	3:05.18 SB
2025	World Relays	Guangzhou, China	6th	4 × 400 m mixed relay	3:16.45
2026	World Indoor Championships	Toruń, Poland	1st	4 × 400 m mixed relay	3:15.60
2026	World Indoor Championships	Toruń, Poland	2nd	4 × 400 m relay	3:03.29
2026	European Championships	Birmingham, United Kingdom	16th (sf)	400 m hurdles	49.39
2026	European Championships	Birmingham, United Kingdom	4th	4 × 400 m relay	2:59.51

=== Personal bests ===
- 100 metres – 10.39 (+1.5 m/s, Mannheim 2010) NU20R
- 200 metres – 20.80 (−0.4 m/s, Brussels 2013)
  - 200 metres indoor – 20.90 (Ghent 2023)
- 400 metres – 45.56 (La Chaux-de-Fonds 2021)
  - 400 metres indoor – 45.44 (Istanbul 2023) NR
- 400 m hurdles – 48.66 (Brussels 2022) NR

=== National titles ===
- Belgian Athletics Championships
  - 100 metres: 2012, 2013
  - 200 metres: 2020
  - 400 metres: 2016
  - 400 m hurdles: 2019
- Belgian Indoor Athletics Championships
  - 400 metres: 2022

== See also ==
- Belgian men's 4 × 400 metres relay team
