= 2025 European Athletics Indoor Championships – Men's 4 × 400 metres relay =

Men's 4 × 400 metres relay at the 2025 European Athletics Indoor Championships
- Venue: Omnisport Apeldoorn
- Location: Apeldoorn, Netherlands
- Dates: 9 March 2025
- Competitors: 24 from 6 nations
- Teams: 6
- Winning time: 3:04.95

Medalists
| gold medal | Eugene Omalla; Nick Smidt; Isaya Klein Ikkink; Tony van Diepen | Netherlands |
| silver medal | Markel Fernandez; Manuel Guijarro; Óscar Husillos; Bernat Erta | Spain |
| bronze medal | Julien Watrin; Christian Iguacel; Florent Mabille; Jonathan Sacoor | Belgium |

The men's 4 × 400 metres relay at the 2025 European Athletics Indoor Championships was held on the short track of Omnisport in Apeldoorn, Netherlands, on 6 and 7 March 2025. This was the 13th time the event was contested at the European Athletics Indoor Championships.

== Background ==
The men's 4 × 400 metres relay was contested 12 times before 2025, at every edition of the European Athletics Indoor Championships since 2000. The 2025 European Athletics Indoor Championships was held in Omnisport Apeldoorn in Apeldoorn, Netherlands. The removable indoor athletics track was retopped for these championships in September 2024.

The United States is the world record holder in the event, with a time of 3:01.39, set in 2018. Poland is the European record holder with a time of 3:01.77, also set in 2018. The championship record is held by Belgium, with a time of 3:02.87, set at the 2015 championships.

Records before the 2025 European Athletics Indoor Championships
| Record | Team | Time (s) | Location | Date |
|---|---|---|---|---|
| World record | Texas A&M (USA) | 3:01.39 | College Station, United States | 10 March 2018 |
| European record | Poland (POL) | 3:01.77 | Birmingham, Great Britain | 4 March 2018 |
| Championship record | Belgium (BEL) | 3:02.87 | Prague, Czech Republic | 8 March 2015 |
| World leading | East Texas A&M | 3:02.21 | Clemson, United States | 15 February 2025 |
| European leading | Turkey (TUR) | 3:10.97 | Belgrade, Serbia | 15 February 2025 |

== Qualification ==
In the men's 4 × 400 metres relay, host country the Netherlands was allocated one place. Three places were allocated in accordance with the order of ranking of European Athletics Member Federation official teams in 4 × 400 m combined outdoor lists 2024. The other two places were allocated in accordance with the accumulated 400m times of individual athletes from 2024 indoor season as at 10 days prior to the first day of the European Athletics Indoor Championships (24 February 2025).

== Results ==
The race was held on 9 March, starting at 18:24 (UTC+1) in the evening.

Results of the final
| Rank | Lane | Nation | Athletes | Time | Note |
|---|---|---|---|---|---|
| 1st place, gold medalist(s) | 6 | Netherlands | Eugene Omalla, Nick Smidt, Isaya Klein Ikkink, Tony van Diepen | 3:04.95 | EL |
| 2nd place, silver medalist(s) | 1 | Spain | Markel Fernandez, Manuel Guijarro, Óscar Husillos, Bernat Erta | 3:05.18 [.174] | NR |
| 3rd place, bronze medalist(s) | 3 | Belgium | Julien Watrin, Christian Iguacel, Florent Mabille, Jonathan Sacoor | 3:05.18 [.176] | SB |
| 4 | 5 | Great Britain | Alex Haydock-Wilson, Efekemo Okoro, Joshua Faulds, Alastair Chalmers | 3:05.49 | SB |
| 5 | 2 | France | Yann Spillmann, Predea Manounou, Felix Levasseur, Téo Andant | 3:05.83 | NR |
| 6 | 4 | Czech Republic | Michal Desenský, Vít Müller, Mikuláš Mutinský, Milan Ščibráni | 3:08.28 | SB |
