= Nick Smidt =

Dutch hurdler

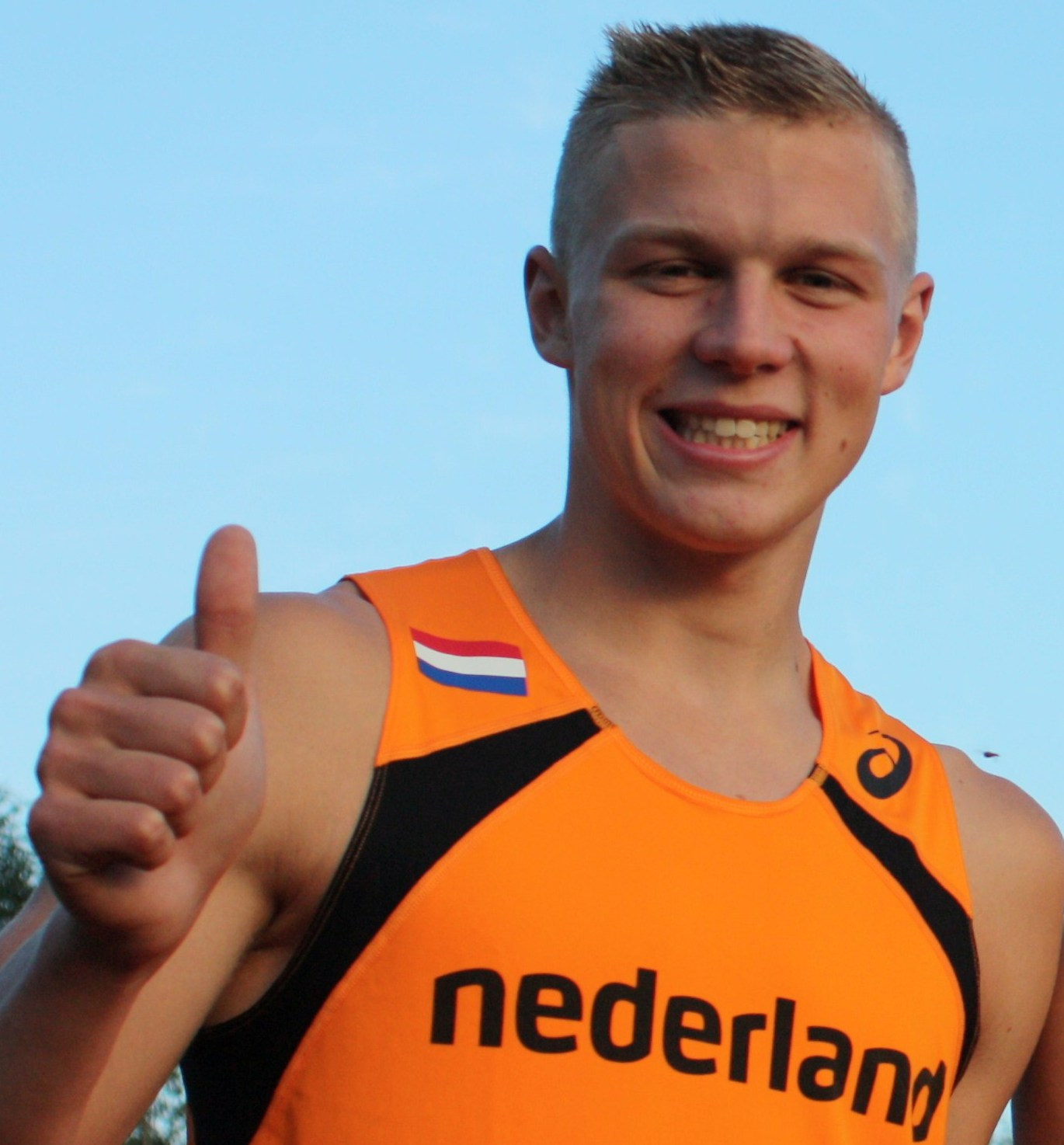
- Nick Smidt in 2015

Personal information
- Born: 12 May 1997 (age 29) Assen, Netherlands
- Height: 1.86 m (6 ft 1 in)
- Weight: 84 kg (185 lb)

Sport
- Sport: Athletics
- Event: 400 metres hurdles
- Club: AAC '61
- Coached by: Betty Hofmeijer; Laurent Meuwly
Medal record
World Indoor Championships
Bronze medal – third place	2022 Belgrade	4 × 400 m relay
European Indoor Championships
Gold medal – first place	2025 Apeldoorn	4 × 400 m mixed
Gold medal – first place	2025 Apeldoorn	4 × 400 m relay
European U23 Championships
Silver medal – second place	2019 Gävle	400 metres hurdles

Nick Smidt (Dutch: [nɪk ˈsmɪt]; born 12 May 1997) is a Dutch athlete specialising in the 400 metres hurdles. He won a silver medal at the 2019 European U23 Championships.

His personal best in the event is 48.36 seconds set in La Chaux-de-Fonds in 2023. This broke a 44-year old Dutch national record set by Harry Schulting in Mexico City in 1979. In August 2024, he precisely matched his national record time in Borås, Sweden.

== International competitions ==
Year	Competition	Venue	Position	Event	Notes
Representing the Netherlands
2015	European Junior Championships	Eskilstuna, Sweden	7th (sf)	400 m hurdles	52.59
2017	European U23 Championships	Bydgoszcz, Poland	–	400 m hurdles	DQ
2018	European Championships	Berlin, Germany	15th (h)	400 m hurdles	50.96
2018	European Championships	Berlin, Germany	9th (h)	4 × 400 m relay	3:04.93
2019	European U23 Championships	Gävle, Sweden	2nd	400 m hurdles	49.49
2019	World Championships	Doha, Qatar	26th (h)	400 m hurdles	50.54
2021	Olympic Games	Tokyo, Japan	19th (sf)	400 m hurdles	49.35
2022	World Indoor Championships	Belgrade, Serbia	3rd	4 × 400 m relay	3:06.90
2022	World Championships	Eugene, United States	15th (sf)	400 m hurdles	49.56
2022	World Championships	Eugene, United States	9th (h)	4 × 400 m relay	3:03.14
2022	European Championships	Munich, Germany	20th (sf)	400 m hurdles	50.29
2024	European Championships	Rome, Italy	8th	400 m hurdles	49.43
2024	Olympic Games	Paris, France	20th (sf)	400 m hurdles	49.61
2025	European Indoor Championships	Apeldoorn, Netherlands	1st	4 × 400 m mixed	3:15.63
2025	European Indoor Championships	Apeldoorn, Netherlands	1st	4 × 400 m relay	3:04.95

== Personal bests ==
Information from his World Athletics profile unless otherwise noted.

Event	Time	Location	Date	Record
400 metres	46.50	Breda, Netherlands	28 July 2023	
indoor 400 metres	46.17	Apeldoorn, Netherlands	22 February 2025	
300 metres hurdles	34.38	Bergen, Norway	3 June 2025	NBP
400 metres hurdles	48.36	La Chaux-de-Fonds, Switzerland	2 July 2023	NR
4 x 400 metres relay	3:01.32	Guangdong, China	11 May 2025	
indoor 4 × 400 m relay	3:04.95	Apeldoorn, Netherlands	9 March 2025	
indoor 4 × 400 m mixed	3:15.63	Apeldoorn, Netherlands	6 March 2025	WB (Note: While the indoor 4 x 400 m mixed relay was an official World athletics discipline per 1 March 2025 and the Dutch team ran the best time so far, it was not recognized as a world record, because the target for the initial record was set at 3:12.44 or faster.)
