= 2019 European Athletics Indoor Championships =

- Edition: 35th
- Dates: 1–3 March
- Host city: Glasgow, United Kingdom
- Venue: Emirates Arena
- Events: 26
- Participation: 582 athletes from 47 nations

The 2019 European Athletics Indoor Championships was held between 1 and 3 March 2019 at the Emirates Arena in Glasgow, Scotland. This was the second time this event was held in the city after the 1990 edition and the third time it was held in the United Kingdom, following the 2007 Edition in Birmingham, England. The three-day competition featured 13 men's and 13 women's athletics events and took place over three morning and three afternoon sessions.

== Bids ==
Apeldoorn, Glasgow, Minsk and Toruń all submitted bids to host the 2019 European Indoor championships. Glasgow were chosen to host the 35th edition of the event with 9 votes ahead of Toruń with 6 votes and Apeldoorn with 1. It is 29 years since Glasgow had last hosted the championships.

== Schedule ==
Friday, March 1
Time	Event	Gender
10:03	Long Jump Q	M
10:05	60 m hurdles Pentathlon	W
10:20	400 m R1	M
10:45	High Jump Pentathlon A/B	W
11:10	800 m R1	W
11:30	Shot Put Q	M
11:55	1500 m R1	M
12:00	Triple Jump Q	W
12:30	3000 m R1	M
12:30	High Jump Q A/B	M
13:00	400 m R1	W
13:15	Shot Put Pentathlon	W
19:00	Pole Vault Q	M
19:02	Shot Put Q	W
19:04	Long Jump Pentathlon	W
19:06	High Jump Q	W
19:10	1500 m R1	W
19:48	800 m R1	M
20:25	Triple Jump Q	M
20:35	Shot Put Final	M
20:36	400 m SF	W
20:55	400 m SF	M
21:15	800 m Pentathlon Final	W
21:40	3000 m Final	W

Saturday, March 2
Time	Event	Gender
10:00	Long Jump Q	W
10:03	Pole Vault Q	W
10:10	60 m Heptathlon	M
10:30	60 m R1	M
11:13	60 m R1	W
11:57	60 m hurdles R1	M
12:05	Long Jump Heptathlon	M
12:31	60 m hurdles R1	W
18:00	High Jump Final	M
18:02	Shot Put Heptathlon	M
18:06	800 m SF	W
18:10	Pole Vault Final	M
18:25	800 m SF	M
18:50	60 m SF	W
19:20	60 m SF	M
19:47	3000 m Final	M
19:50	High Jump Heptathlon A/B	M
20:10	400 m Final	W
20:22	400 m Final	M
20:35	60 m Final	W
20:50	60 m Final	M

Sunday, March 3
Time	Event	Gender
10:00	Triple Jump Final	W
10:06	60 m hurdles Heptathlon	M
11:05	60 m hurdles SF	M
11:15	Pole Vault Heptathlon	M
11:25	60 m hurdles SF	W
11:35	Long Jump Final	M
12:20	Shot Put Final	W
18:00	Long Jump Final	W
18:05	Pole Vault Final	W
18:10	60 m hurdles Final	M
18:25	60 m hurdles Final	W
18:57	800 m Final	M
19:15	High Jump Final	W
19:18	800 m Final	W
19:35	Triple Jump Final	M
19:37	1000 m Heptathlon Final	M
20:01	1500 m Final	M
20:12	1500 m Final	W
20:25	4 × 400 m Final	M
20:40	4 × 400 m Final	W

== Men's results ==
=== Track ===
Event	Gold		Silver		Bronze	
60 metres	Ján Volko; Slovakia	6.60	Emre Zafer Barnes; Turkey	6.61	Joris van Gool; Netherlands	6.62
400 metres	Karsten Warholm; Norway	45.05 =ER	Óscar Husillos; Spain	45.66 NR	Tony van Diepen; Netherlands	46.13 NR
800 metres	Álvaro de Arriba; Spain	1:46.83	Jamie Webb; Great Britain	1:47.13 PB	Mark English; Ireland	1:47.39
1500 metres	Marcin Lewandowski; Poland	3:42.85	Jakob Ingebrigtsen; Norway	3:43.23	Jesús Gómez; Spain	3:44.39
3000 metres	Jakob Ingebrigtsen; Norway	7:56.15	Chris O'Hare; Great Britain	7:57.19	Henrik Ingebrigtsen; Norway	7:57.19
60 metres hurdles	Milan Trajkovic; Cyprus	7.60	Pascal Martinot-Lagarde; France	7.61	Aurel Manga; France	7.62
4 × 400 metres relay	Belgium; Julien Watrin; Dylan Borlée; Jonathan Borlée; Kevin Borlée	3:06.27	Spain; Óscar Husillos; Manuel Guijarro; Lucas Búa; Bernat Erta	3:06.32 NR	France; Mame-Ibra Anne; Thomas Jordier; Nicolas Courbière; Fabrisio Saïdy	3:07.71

=== Field ===
Event	Gold		Silver		Bronze	
High jump	Gianmarco Tamberi; Italy	2.32 EL	Konstadinos Baniotis; Greece Andriy Protsenko; Ukraine	2.26	Not awarded	
Pole vault	Paweł Wojciechowski; Poland	5.90 PB	Piotr Lisek; Poland	5.85	Melker Svärd Jacobsson; Sweden	5.75
Long jump	Miltiadis Tentoglou; Greece	8.38 WL NR	Thobias Nilsson Montler; Sweden	8.17 PB	Strahinja Jovančević; Serbia	8.03 NR
Triple jump	Nazim Babayev; Azerbaijan	17.29 PB	Nelson Évora; Portugal	17.11 SB	Max Heß; Germany	17.10 SB
Shot put	Michał Haratyk; Poland	21.65 EL PB	David Storl; Germany	21.54 SB	Tomáš Staněk; Czech Republic	21.25 SB

=== Combined ===
Event	Gold		Silver		Bronze	
Heptathlon	Jorge Ureña; Spain	6218 WL	Tim Duckworth; Great Britain	6156	Ilya Shkurenyov; Authorised Neutral Athletes	6145

== Women's results ==
=== Track ===
Event	Gold		Silver		Bronze	
60 metres	Ewa Swoboda; Poland	7.09	Dafne Schippers; Netherlands	7.14 SB	Asha Philip; Great Britain	7.15
400 metres	Léa Sprunger; Switzerland	51.61 WL	Cynthia Bolingo Mbongo; Belgium	51.62 NR	Lisanne de Witte; Netherlands	52.34 PB
800 metres	Shelayna Oskan-Clarke; Great Britain	2:02.58	Rénelle Lamote; France	2:03.00	Olha Lyakhova; Ukraine	2:03.24
1500 metres	Laura Muir; Great Britain	4:05.92	Sofia Ennaoui; Poland	4:09.30	Ciara Mageean; Ireland	4:09.43
3000 metres	Laura Muir; Great Britain	8:30.61 CR	Konstanze Klosterhalfen; Germany	8:34.06	Melissa Courtney; Great Britain	8:38.22 PB
60 metres hurdles	Nadine Visser; Netherlands	7.87 EL	Cindy Roleder; Germany	7.97	Elvira Herman; Belarus	8.00
4 × 400 metres relay	Poland; Anna Kiełbasińska; Iga Baumgart-Witan; Małgorzata Hołub-Kowalik; Justyna Święty-Ersetic	3:28.77	Great Britain; Laviai Nielsen; Zoey Clark; Amber Anning; Eilidh Doyle	3:29.55	Italy; Raphaela Lukudo; Ayomide Folorunso; Chiara Bazzoni; Marta Milani	3:31.90

=== Field ===
Event	Gold		Silver		Bronze	
High jump	Mariya Lasitskene; Authorised Neutral Athletes	2.01 EL	Yuliya Levchenko; Ukraine	1.99	Airinė Palšytė; Lithuania	1.97
Pole vault	Anzhelika Sidorova; Authorised Neutral Athletes	4.85	Holly Bradshaw; Great Britain	4.75	Nikoleta Kyriakopoulou; Greece	4.65
Long jump	Ivana Španović; Serbia	6.99 WL	Nastassia Mironchyk-Ivanova; Belarus	6.93 PB	Maryna Bekh; Ukraine	6.84
Triple jump	Ana Peleteiro; Spain	14.73 EL	Paraskevi Papahristou; Greece	14.50 PB	Olha Saladukha; Ukraine	14.47 SB
Shot put	Radoslava Mavrodieva; Bulgaria	19.12 PB	Christina Schwanitz; Germany	19.11	Anita Márton; Hungary	19.00 SB

=== Combined ===
Event	Gold		Silver		Bronze	
Pentathlon	Katarina Johnson-Thompson; Great Britain	4983 WL	Niamh Emerson; Great Britain	4731 PB	Solène Ndama; France	4723 =NR

== Medal table ==
* Host nation (Great Britain)

Rank	Nation	Gold	Silver	Bronze	Total
1	Poland (POL)	5	2	0	7
2	Great Britain (GBR)*	4	6	2	12
3	Spain (ESP)	3	2	1	6
4	Norway (NOR)	2	1	1	4
–	Authorised Neutral Athletes (ANA)	2	0	1	3
5	Greece (GRE)	1	2	1	4
6	Netherlands (NED)	1	1	3	5
7	Belgium (BEL)	1	1	0	2
8	Italy (ITA)	1	0	1	2
8	Serbia (SRB)	1	0	1	2
10	Azerbaijan (AZE)	1	0	0	1
10	Bulgaria (BUL)	1	0	0	1
10	Cyprus (CYP)	1	0	0	1
10	Slovakia (SVK)	1	0	0	1
10	Switzerland (SUI)	1	0	0	1
15	Germany (GER)	0	4	1	5
16	France (FRA)	0	2	3	5
16	Ukraine (UKR)	0	2	3	5
18	Belarus (BLR)	0	1	1	2
18	Sweden (SWE)	0	1	1	2
20	Portugal (POR)	0	1	0	1
20	Turkey (TUR)	0	1	0	1
22	Ireland (IRL)	0	0	2	2
23	Czech Republic (CZE)	0	0	1	1
23	Hungary (HUN)	0	0	1	1
23	Lithuania (LTU)	0	0	1	1
Totals (25 entries)		26	27	25	78

== Participating nations ==
There was a total of 582 participants from 47 nations down from the 637 originally entered. Although originally announced, no athlete from Albania or Kosovo showed up.

- Andorra (1)
- Armenia (2)
- Austria (8)
- Authorised Neutral Athletes (11)
- Azerbaijan (2)
- Belarus (17)
- Belgium (14)
- Bosnia and Herzegovina (3)
- Bulgaria (6)
- Croatia (5)
- Cyprus (4)
- Czech Republic (21)
- Denmark (6)
- Estonia (4)
- Finland (13)
- France (40)
- Georgia (1)
- Germany (27)
- Gibraltar (2)
- Great Britain (47)
- Greece (16)
- Hungary (12)
- Iceland (2)
- Ireland (15)
- Israel (2)
- Italy (24)
- Latvia (10)
- Lithuania (9)
- Luxembourg (5)
- Malta (2)
- Moldova (1)
- Montenegro (1)
- Netherlands (15)
- North Macedonia (1)
- Norway (17)
- Poland (28)
- Portugal (13)
- Romania (12)
- San Marino (1)
- Serbia (10)
- Slovakia (9)
- Slovenia (8)
- Spain (42)
- Sweden (30)
- Switzerland (16)
- Turkey (15)
- Ukraine (32)
