= 2025 European Athletics Indoor Championships =

- Organisers: EAA
- Edition: 38th
- Dates: 6–9 March 2025
- Host city: Apeldoorn, Netherlands
- Venue: Omnisport Apeldoorn
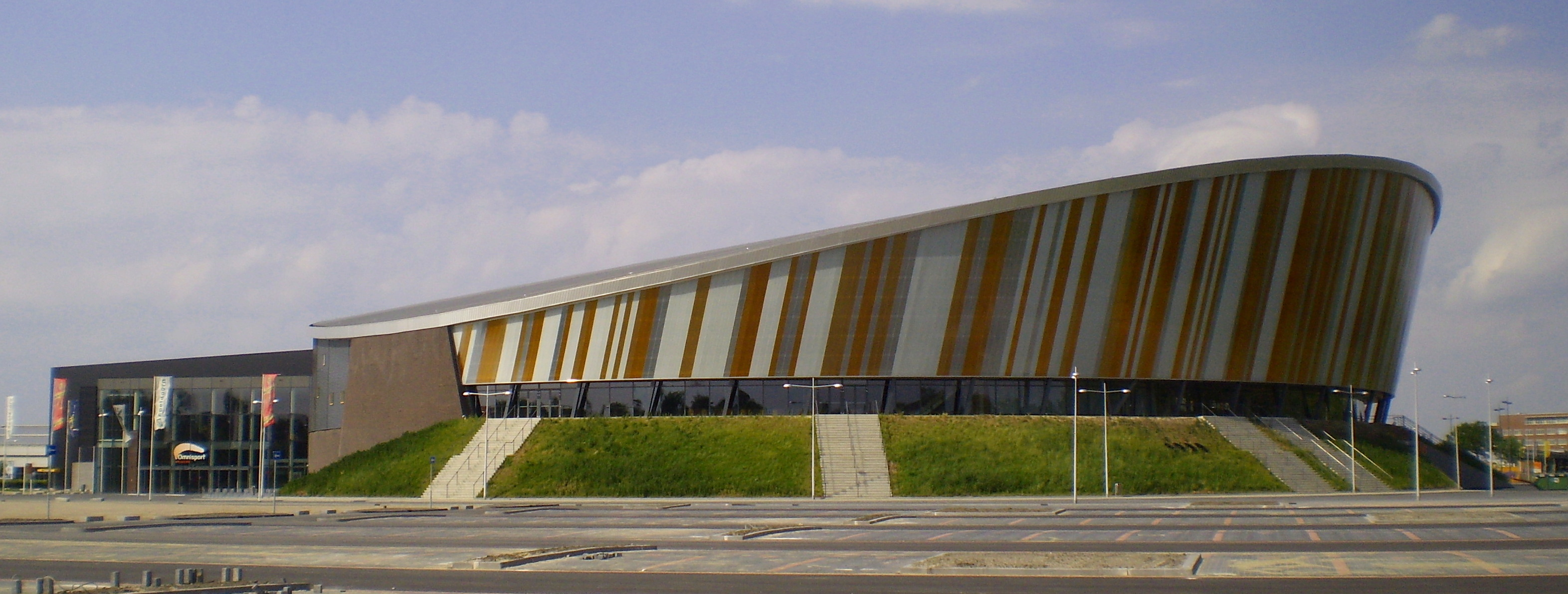
- Level: Senior
- Type: Indoor
- Events: 27
- Participation: 570 athletes from 46 nations
- Official website: EAA; LOC (archived 2025-03-17)

The 2025 European Athletics Indoor Championships were held from 6 to 9 March 2025 at the Omnisport Apeldoorn arena in Apeldoorn, Netherlands. The four-day competition features thirteen men's, thirteen women's and one mixed athletics events over three morning and four afternoon sessions.

It is the 38th edition of the European Athletics Indoor Championships and the third time that the Netherlands has staged the continent's top indoor competition in athletics after Rotterdam 1973 and The Hague 1989. It is also the third time in a decade that the country has hosted a major European Athletics event after the outdoor 2016 European Athletics Championships in Amsterdam and 2018 European Cross Country Championships in Tilburg.

On 6 May 2022, the European Athletic Association (EAA) chose Apeldoorn at its 164th Council Meeting held in Munich. The organization of the event is a partnership of local athletics clubs, the municipality of Apeldoorn, the Province of Gelderland, TIG Sports and the Royal Dutch Athletics Federation (Atletiekunie). In March 2024, former athlete Dafne Schippers was appointed tournament director.

== Schedule ==
All times are local (UTC+1).

Q	Qualification	R1	Round 1	SF	Semi-finals	F	Final
M = morning session, E = evening session

Men
Date →	6 Mar	7 Mar		8 Mar			9 Mar	
Event ↓	E	M	E	M	E		M	E
60 m				R1	SF	F		
400 m		R1	SF		F			
800 m		R1			SF			F
1500 m	R1		F					
3000 m				R1				F
60 m hurdles	R1	SF	F					
4 × 400 m								F
High jump	Q				F			
Pole vault			Q					F
Long jump	Q		F					
Triple jump		Q			F			
Shot put							Q	F
Heptathlon		F						

Women
Date →	6 Mar	7 Mar		8 Mar		9 Mar		
Event ↓	E	M	E	M	E	M	E	
60 m						R1	SF	F
400 m		R1	SF		F			
800 m		R1			SF		F	
1500 m	R1		F					
3000 m				R1			F	
60 m hurdles	R1	SF	F					
4 × 400 m							F	
High jump		Q					F	
Pole vault	Q				F			
Long jump		Q			F			
Triple jump	Q		F					
Shot put				Q			F	
Pentathlon						F		

Mixed
Date →	6 Mar	7 Mar		8 Mar		9 Mar	
Event ↓	E	M	E	M	E	M	E
4 × 400 m	F						

Event detailed schedule
Day 1 — Thursday, 6 March 2025
Time	Event	Gender	Round
18:20	High jump	M	Qualification
18:35	Triple jump	W	Qualification
19:05	Pole vault	W	Qualification
19:10	1500 metres	W	Round 1
19:55	1500 metres	M	Round 1
20:30	Long jump	M	Qualification
20:50	60 metres hurdles	W	Round 1
21:17	60 metres hurdles	M	Round 1
21:50	4 × 400 metres relay	X	Final
Day 2 — Friday, 7 March 2025
Time	Event	Gender	Round
09:30	60 metres	M	Heptathlon
10:05	Long jump	M	Heptathlon
10:15	800 metres	W	Round 1
11:00	High jump	W	Qualification
11:05	800 metres	M	Round 1
11:42	Long jump	W	Qualification
11:55	400 metres	W	Round 1
12:45	400 metres	M	Round 1
12:58	Shot put	M	Heptathlon
13:40	Triple jump	M	Qualification
13:45	60 metres hurdles	W	Semifinals
14:05	60 metres hurdles	M	Semifinals
18:50	Triple jump	W	Final
19:00	High jump	M	Heptathlon
19:05	Pole vault	M	Qualification
19:58	400 metres	W	Semifinals
20:19	400 metres	M	Semifinals
20:34	Long jump	M	Final
21:00	1500 metres	W	Final
21:15	1500 metres	M	Final
21:43	60 metres hurdles	W	Final
21:53	60 metres hurdles	M	Final
Day 3 — Saturday, 8 March 2025
Time	Event	Gender	Round
10:00	60 metres hurdles	M	Heptathlon
10:20	3000 metres	W	Round 1
10:50	Shot put	W	Qualification
11:00	Pole vault	M	Heptathlon
12:00	60 metres	M	Round 1
12:45	3000 metres	M	Round 1
18:40	Triple jump	M	Final
19:10	60 metres	M	Semifinals
19:35	Pole vault	W	Final
19:53	800 metres	W	Semifinals
20:09	High jump	M	Final
20:29	800 metres	M	Semifinals
20:29	Long jump	W	Final
20:45	1000 metres	M	Final heptathlon
21:10	400 metres	M	Final
21:40	60 metres	M	Final
21:50	400 metres	W	Final
Day 4 — Sunday, 9 March 2025
Time	Event	Gender	Round
9:00	60 metres hurdles	W	Pentathlon
9:50	High jump	W	Pentathlon
10:05	Shot put	M	Qualification
12:00	60 metres	M	Round 1
12:21	Shot put	W	Pentathlon
15:10	Long jump	W	Pentathlon
16:05	60 metres	W	Semifinals
16:28	Shot put	M	Final
16:33	800 metres	W	Final
16:42	Pole vault	M	Final
16:50	3000 metres	M	Final
17:05	High jump	W	Final
17:27	800 metres	M	Final
17:36	3000 metres	W	Final
17:52	Shot put	W	Final
18:03	800 meters	W	Final pentathlon
18:24	4 × 400 meters relay	M	Final
18:37	60 metres	W	Final
18:50	4 × 400 meters relay	W	Final

== Medal table ==
* Host nation (Netherlands)

Medal table of 2025 European Athletics Indoor Championships
Rank	Nation	Gold	Silver	Bronze	Total
1	Netherlands*	7	2	0	9
2	Italy	3	1	2	6
3	Norway	3	1	1	5
4	Switzerland	2	3	0	5
5	Poland	2	1	1	4
6	Ukraine	2	0	0	2
7	France	1	3	4	8
8	Great Britain	1	3	3	7
9	Spain	1	1	2	4
10	Romania	1	1	0	2
11	Ireland	1	0	2	3
12	Finland	1	0	1	2
13	Bulgaria	1	0	0	1
13	Greece	1	0	0	1
13	Hungary	1	0	0	1
16	Germany	0	2	2	4
17	Belgium	0	2	1	3
17	Sweden	0	2	1	3
19	Portugal	0	1	3	4
20	Czech Republic	0	1	2	3
21	Slovenia	0	1	1	2
22	Serbia	0	1	0	1
23	Luxembourg	0	0	1	1
Totals (23 entries)		28	26	27	81

== Medal summary ==
=== Men ===
Event	Gold		Silver		Bronze	
60 metres	Jeremiah Azu; Great Britain	6.49 EL PB	Henrik Larsson; Sweden	6.52 NR	Andrew Robertson; Great Britain	6.55 SB
400 metres	Attila Molnár; Hungary	45.25	Maksymilian Szwed; Poland	45.31 EU23R, NR	Jimy Soudril; France	45.59 PB
800 metres	Samuel Chapple; Netherlands	1:44.88 NR	Eliott Crestan; Belgium	1:44.92	Mark English; Ireland	1:45.46
1500 metres	Jakob Ingebrigtsen; Norway	3:36.56	Azeddine Habz; France	3:36.92	Isaac Nader; Portugal	3:37.10
3000 metres	Jakob Ingebrigtsen; Norway	7:48.37 SB	George Mills; Great Britain	7:49.41	Azeddine Habz; France	7:50.48
60 metres hurdles	Jakub Szymański; Poland	7.43	Wilhem Belocian; France	7.45	Just Kwaou-Mathey; France	7.50
4 × 400 metres relay	Netherlands; Eugene Omalla; Nick Smidt; Isaya Klein Ikkink; Tony van Diepen	3:04.95 EL	Spain; Markel Fernández; Manuel Guijarro; Óscar Husillos; Bernat Erta	3:05.18 NR	Belgium; Julien Watrin; Christian Iguacel; Florent Mabille; Jonathan Sacoor	3:05.18 SB
High jump	Oleh Doroshchuk; Ukraine	2.34 m WL PB	Jan Štefela; Czech Republic	2.29 m	Matteo Sioli; Italy	2.29 m PB
Pole vault	Emmanouil Karalis; Greece Menno Vloon; Netherlands SB	5.90 m	Not awarded		Sondre Guttormsen; Norway	5.90 m SB
Long jump	Bozhidar Sarâboyukov; Bulgaria	8.13 m	Mattia Furlani; Italy	8.12 m	Lester Lescay; Spain	8.12 m SB
Triple jump	Andy Díaz Hernández; Italy	17.71 m WL	Max Heß; Germany	17.43 m SB	Andrea Dallavalle; Italy	17.19 m
Shot put	Andrei Rares Toader; Romania	21.27 m NR	Wictor Petersson; Sweden	21.04 m	Tomáš Staněk; Czech Republic	20.75 m
Heptathlon	Sander Skotheim; Norway	6558 pts ER, CR, WL	Simon Ehammer; Switzerland	6506 pts NR	Till Steinforth; Germany	6388 pts NR
WR world record | AR area record | CR championship record | GR games record | NR national record | OR Olympic record | PB personal best | SB season best | WL world leading (in a given season)

- Note: * = Relay athletes who only ran in heats

=== Women ===
Event	Gold		Silver		Bronze	
60 metres	Zaynab Dosso; Italy	7.01 NR, WL	Mujinga Kambundji; Switzerland	7.02 SB	Patrizia van der Weken; Luxembourg	7.06 =NR
400 metres	Lieke Klaver; Netherlands	50.38 EL	Henriette Jæger; Norway	50.45	Paula Sevilla; Spain	50.99 =NR
800 metres	Anna Wielgosz; Poland	2:02.09	Clara Liberman; France	2:02.32	Anita Horvat; Slovenia	2:02.52
1500 metres	Agathe Guillemot; France	4:07.23	Salomé Afonso; Portugal	4:07.66	Revée Walcott-Nolan; Great Britain	4:08.45
3000 metres	Sarah Healy; Ireland	8:52.86	Melissa Courtney-Bryant; Great Britain	8:52.92	Salomé Afonso; Portugal	8:53.42
60 metres hurdles	Ditaji Kambundji; Switzerland	7.67 ER, CR, WL	Nadine Visser; Netherlands	7.72 NR	Pia Skrzyszowska; Poland	7.83 SB
4 × 400 metres relay	Netherlands; Lieke Klaver; Nina Franke; Cathelijn Peeters; Femke Bol	3:24.34 CR, NR, WL	Great Britain; Lina Nielsen; Hannah Kelly; Emily Newnham; Amber Anning	3:24.89 NR	Czech Republic; Lada Vondrová; Nikoleta Jíchová; Tereza Petržilková; Lurdes Gloria Manuel	3:25.31 NR
High jump	Yaroslava Mahuchikh; Ukraine	1.99	Angelina Topić; Serbia	1.95	Engla Nilsson; Sweden	1.92 PB
Pole vault	Angelica Moser; Switzerland	4.80 SB	Tina Šutej; Slovenia	4.75 SB	Marie-Julie Bonnin; France	4.70
Long jump	Larissa Iapichino; Italy	6.94 SB	Annik Kälin; Switzerland	6.90 NR	Malaika Mihambo; Germany	6.88
Triple jump	Ana Peleteiro-Compaoré; Spain	14.37 EL	Diana Ana Maria Ion; Romania	14.31 PB	Senni Salminen; Finland	13.99
Shot put	Jessica Schilder; Netherlands	20.69 WL NR	Yemisi Ogunleye; Germany	19.56	Auriol Dongmo; Portugal	19.26 SB
Pentathlon	Saga Vanninen; Finland	4922 pts EU23R, NR, WL	Sofie Dokter; Netherlands	4826 pts PB	Kate O'Connor; Ireland	4781 pts NR
WR world record | AR area record | CR championship record | GR games record | NR national record | OR Olympic record | PB personal best | SB season best | WL world leading (in a given season)

=== Mixed ===
Event	Gold		Silver		Bronze	
4 × 400 metres relay	Netherlands; Nick Smidt; Eveline Saalberg; Tony van Diepen; Femke Bol	3:15.63 CR, SB	Belgium; Julien Watrin; Imke Vervaet; Christian Iguacel; Helena Ponette	3:16.19	Great Britain; Alastair Chalmers; Emily Newnham; Joshua Faulds; Lina Nielsen	3:16.49

== Qualification criteria ==
In all individual events athletes can qualify in one of two ways: by achieving the Entry Standard within the qualification period in accordance with the criteria detailed below, or by virtue of the World Rankings Position achieved at the end of the qualification period according to the respective Event Ranking Rules (and ranking period). In case of ties, athletes with the next best Performance Score will prevail. Each European Athletics Member Federation may enter up to four qualified athletes in each individual event of whom up to three may participate.

In the relays, host country the Netherlands will be allocated one place in each relay. Three places will be allocated in accordance with the order of ranking of European Athletics Member Federation official teams in 4 × 400 m combined outdoor lists 2024. The other two places (or three if the Netherlands does not take its allocated place) shall be allocated in accordance with the accumulated 400 m times of individual athletes from 2024 indoor season as at 10 days prior to the first day of the European Athletics Indoor Championships (24 February 2025).

Member Federations who have no male and/or no female athletes who have achieved the Entry Standards or considered as having achieved the Entry Standard or no male and/or no female athletes who are potentially qualified by World Rankings, may enter one unqualified male athlete and/or one unqualified female athlete in one individual event of the Championships. Two unqualified athletes of the same gender are not allowed.

The qualification period for the Combined Events is from 20 August 2023 to midnight 23 February 2025 (regardless of the time zone). For all other events, the qualification period is from 25 February 2024 to midnight 23 February 2025 (regardless of the time zone).

All athletes born before and including 2009 (aged at least 16 years on 31 December 2025) are eligible to compete, except for the men's shot put where the limit is 2007 (athletes aged at least 18 years on 31 December 2025).

Entry Standards and target numbers of athletes / teams per event
Event	Men		Women		Quota
Event	Indoor	Outdoor	Indoor	Outdoor	Quota
60 metres	6.60	10.05 for 100 m	7.20	11.05 for 100 m	40
400 metres	46.20	45.00	52.10	50.70	30
800 metres	1:46.40	1:44.50	2:02.00	1:59.00	30
1500 metres	3:37.00	3:32.00	4:08.00	4:02.00	27
3000 metres	7:43.00	7:36.00	8:48.00	8:39.00	24
60 m hurdles	7.63	13.25 for 110 mH	8.00	12.80 for 100 mH	32
High jump	2.30 m		1.96 m		18
Pole vault	5.85 m		4.70 m		18
Long jump	8.10 m		6.80 m		18
Triple jump	17.00 m		14.35 m		18
Shot put	21.40 m		18.90 m		18
Combined events	6150 pts	8450 pts for decathlon	4600 pts	6650 pts for heptathlon	14
Relays	—N/a	—N/a	—N/a	—N/a	6

== Participating nations ==
626 athletes from 46 member federations were entered in the Championships of which 570 competed. In brackets the number of athletes participating.

- Albania (1)
- Andorra (1)
- Armenia (2)
- Austria (6)
- Azerbaijan (1)
- Belgium (23)
- Bulgaria (7)
- Croatia (7)
- Cyprus (2)
- Czech Republic (25)
- Denmark (4)
- Estonia (9)
- Finland (25)
- France (41)
- Georgia (2)
- Germany (38)
- Gibraltar (1)
- Great Britain (37)
- Greece (19)
- Hungary (15)
- Iceland (3)
- Ireland (8)
- Israel (1)
- Italy (37)
- Kosovo (1)
- Latvia (3)
- Lithuania (8)
- Luxembourg (1)
- Malta (2)
- Moldova (1)
- Montenegro (1)
- Netherlands (45)
- North Macedonia (1)
- Norway (14)
- Poland (29)
- Portugal (20)
- Romania (7)
- San Marino (1)
- Serbia (9)
- Slovakia (5)
- Slovenia (8)
- Spain (34)
- Sweden (19)
- Switzerland (20)
- Turkey (8)
- Ukraine (17)
