= Manuel Guijarro (athlete) =

Spanish sprinter

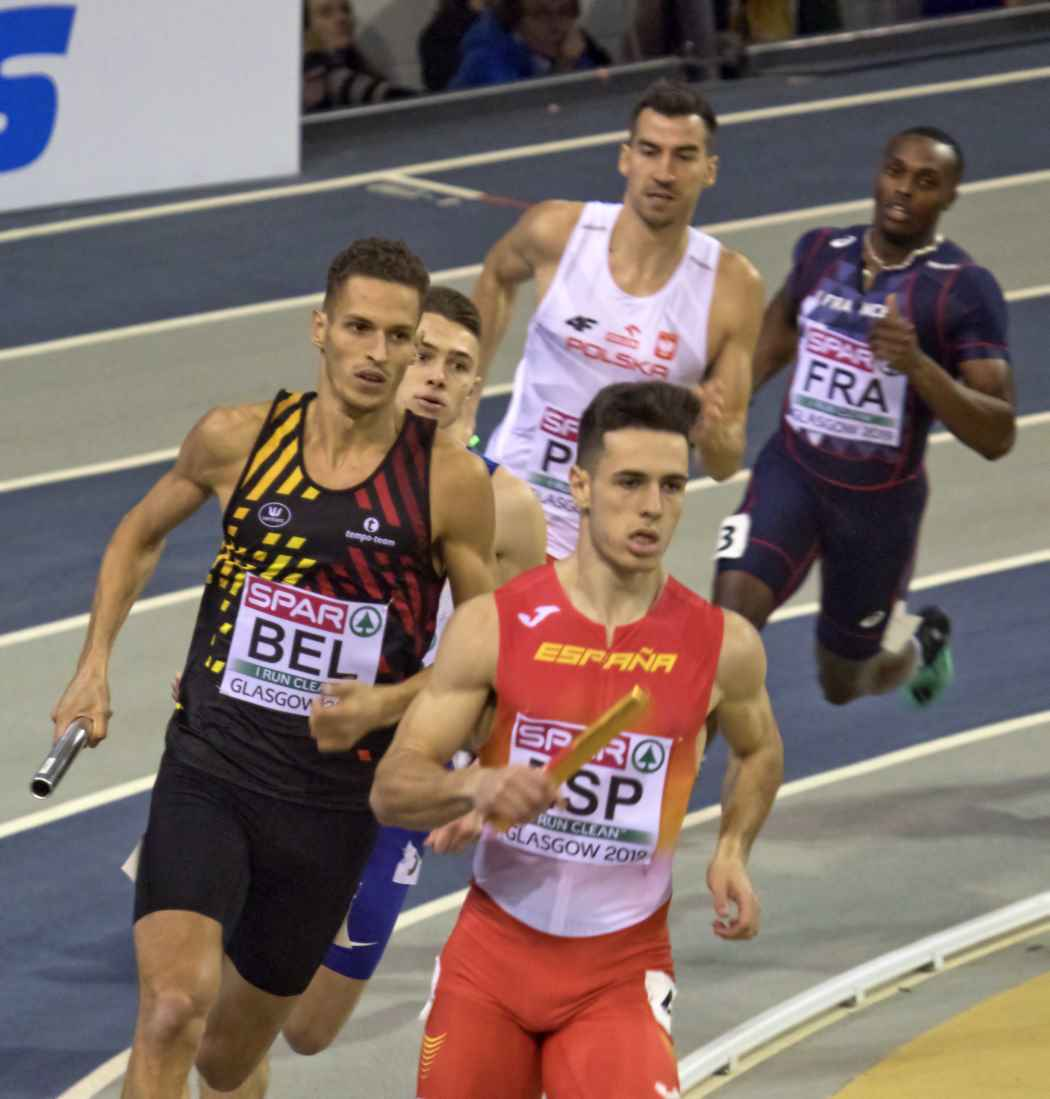
- Guijarro (front) in 2019

Personal information
- Born: 7 July 1998 (age 27) Villarobledo, Spain
- Height: 1.89 m (6 ft 2 in)
- Weight: 79 kg (174 lb)

Sport
- Sport: Athletics
- Event: 400 m
- Club: FC Barcelona
- Coached by: Manuel Fernández
Medal record
Men's athletics
Representing Spain
World Indoor Championships
Silver medal – second place	2022 Belgrade	4×400 m relay
European Indoor Championships
Silver medal – second place	2019 Glasgow	4 × 400 m
Silver medal – second place	2025 Apeldoorn	4 × 400 m

Manuel Guijarro Arenas (born 7 July 1998) is a Spanish sprinter specialising in the 400 metres. He was part of the relay that holds the national record in the 4 x 400 m indoor.

== International competitions ==
Year	Competition	Venue	Position	Event	Notes
Representing Spain
2015	World Youth Championships	Cali, Colombia	29th (h)	400 m	48.54
2018	World Indoor Championships	Birmingham, United Kingdom	7th (h)	4 × 400 m relay	3:07.52
2018	Mediterranean U23 Championships	Jesolo, Italy	5th	400 m	46.63
2018	Mediterranean U23 Championships	Jesolo, Italy	3rd	4 x 400 m relay	3:09.78
2019	Mediterranean U23 Indoor Championships	Miramas, France	7th (h)	400 m	48.68
2019	European Indoor Championships	Glasgow, United Kingdom	8th (sf)	400 m	47.34
2019	European Indoor Championships	Glasgow, United Kingdom	2nd	4 x 400 m relay	3:06.32
2019	European U23 Championships	Gävle, Sweden	5th	4 × 400 m relay	3:07.62
2021	World Relays	Chorzów, Poland	13th (h)	4 × 400 m relay	3:06.09
2022	World Indoor Championships	Belgrade, Serbia	20th (h)	400 m	47.74
2022	World Indoor Championships	Belgrade, Serbia	2nd	4 × 400 m relay	3:06.82
2022	Ibero-American Championships	La Nucía, Spain	6th	400 m	46.20
2022	Ibero-American Championships	La Nucía, Spain	2nd	4 × 400 m relay	3:04.05
2022	European Championships	Munich, Germany	18th (h)	400 m	46.18
2023	European Indoor Championships	Istanbul, Turkey	25th (h)	400 m	49.77
2024	World Relays	Nassau, Bahamas	22nd (h)	4 × 400 m relay	3:06.84
2024	European Championships	Rome, Italy	5th	4 × 400 m relay	3:01.44
2025	European Indoor Championships	Apeldoorn, Netherlands	2nd	4 × 400 m relay	3:05.18
2025	World Indoor Championships	Nanjing, China	18th (h)	400 m	47.47
