= Bernat Erta =

Spanish sprinter

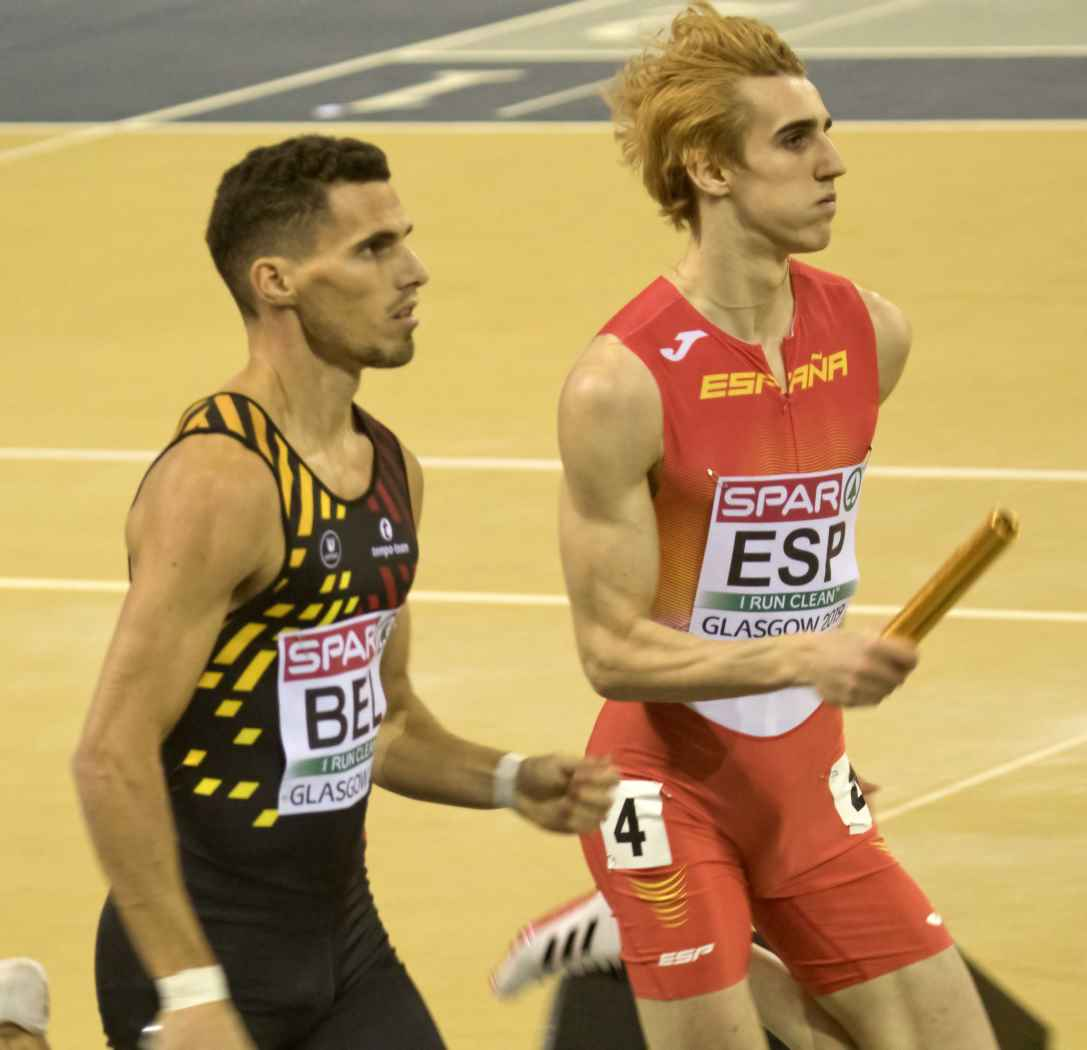

Personal information
- Full name: Bernat Erta Majó
- Nationality: Spanish
- Born: 15 February 2001 (age 25) Lleida, Spain
- Height: 1.85 m (6 ft 1 in)
- Weight: 65 kg (143 lb)

Sport
- Sport: Athletics
- Event: 400 m
- Club: FC Barcelona
- Coached by: Joaquim Erta
Medal record
Men's athletics
Representing Spain
World Indoor Championships
Silver medal – second place	2022 Belgrade	4×400 m relay
European Indoor Championships
Silver medal – second place	2019 Glasgow	4 × 400 m
Silver medal – second place	2025 Apeldoorn	4 × 400 m

Bernat Erta Majo (born 15 February 2001 in Lleida) is a Spanish sprinter specialising in the 400 and 400 metres hurdles. He was part of the relay that holds the national record in the 4 × 400 m indoor.

== International competitions ==
Year	Competition	Venue	Position	Event	Notes
Representing Spain
2018	European U18 Championships	Győr, Hungary	6th	400 m	47.50
2018	Youth Olympic Games	Buenos Aires, Argentina	6th	400 m	48.13
2019	European Indoor Championships	Glasgow, United Kingdom	2nd	4 × 400 m relay i	3:06.32
2019	European U20 Championships	Borås, Sweden	2nd	400 m	46.24
2019	European U20 Championships	Borås, Sweden	3rd	4 × 400 m relay	3:08.66
2021	World Relays	Chorzów, Poland	6th	Mixed 4 × 400 m relay	3:19.65
2021	European U23 Championships	Tallinn, Estonia	7th	400 m	46.01
2021	European U23 Championships	Tallinn, Estonia	3rd (h)	4 × 400 m relay	3:09.14
2021	Olympic Games	Tokyo, Japan	9th (h)	Mixed 4 × 400 m relay	3:13.29
2022	World Indoor Championships	Belgrade, Serbia	2nd	4 × 400 m relay i	3:06.82
2023	European U23 Championships	Espoo, Finland	15th (sf)	400 m	47.10
2023	European U23 Championships	Espoo, Finland	6th	4 × 400 m relay	3:05.68
2023	World Championships	Budapest, Hungary	15th (h)	4 × 400 m relay	3:02.64
2024	World Relays	Nassau, Bahamas	22nd (h)	4 × 400 m relay	3:06.84
2025	European Indoor Championships	Apeldoorn, Netherlands	2nd	4 × 400 m relay i	3:05.18
2025	World Championships	Tokyo, Japan	9th (h)	Mixed 4 × 400 m relay	3:12.57
2026	European Championships	Birmingham, United Kingdom	9th (h)	4 × 400 m relay	3:01.44
