= 2022 World Athletics Indoor Championships =

18th World Athletics Indoor Championships
- Dates: 18–20 March 2022
- Host city: Belgrade, Serbia
- Venue: Štark Arena
- Events: 26
- Participation: 611 athletes from 128 nations

The 18th World Athletics Indoor Championships were held from 18 to 20 March 2022 in Belgrade, Serbia.

Ethiopia headed the medal table, with 4 gold medals. United States won the most medals, with 19, as well as getting the second highest number of golds, with 3.

== Bidding process ==
Belgrade won the bid for the Championships on November 22, 2019.

== Schedule ==
H	Heats	S	Semi-finals	F	Final
M = morning session, A = afternoon session

All dates are CET (GMT+1)

Men
Date →	18 March		19 March			20 March		
Event ↓	M	A	M	A		M	A	
60 m			H	S	F			
400 m	H	S		F				
800 m	H			F				
1500 m			H				F	
3000 m	H					F		
60 m hurdles						H	S	F
4 × 400 m						H	F	
High jump						F		
Pole vault							F	
Long jump		F						
Triple jump	F							
Shot put				F				
Heptathlon	F							

Women
Date →	18 March			19 March			20 March	
Event ↓	M	A		M	A		M	A
60 m	H	S	F					
400 m	H	S			F			
800 m				H				F
1500 m	H				F			
3000 m		F						
60 m hurdles				H	S	F		
4 × 400 m							H	F
High jump				F				
Pole vault					F			
Long jump								F
Triple jump							F	
Shot put		F						
Pentathlon	F							

Event schedule
Day 1 — Friday, 18 March 2022
Time (CET)	Division	Event	Round
9:35	W	60 Metres Hurdles	Pentathlon
9:55	M	60 Metres	Heptathlon
10:15	W	60 Metres	Heats
10:40	M	Long Jump	Heptathlon
11:00	M	400 Metres	Heats
11:10	W	High Jump	Pentathlon
11:45	W	400 Metres	Heats
12:05	M	Shot Put	Heptathlon
12:10	M	Triple Jump	Final
12:30	W	1500 Metres	Heats
13:00	M	800 Metres	Heats
13:20	W	Shot Put	Pentathlon
13:30	M	3000 Metres	Heats
17:30	W	Long Jump	Pentathlon
18:10	W	60 Metres	Semi-final
18:35	W	400 Metres	Semi-final
18:55	W	Shot Put	Final
19:00	M	High Jump	Heptathlon
19:05	M	Long Jump	Final
19:10	M	400 Metres	Semi-final
20:00	W	800 Metres	Pentathlon
20:30	W	3000 Metres	Final
20:55	W	60 Metres	Final
Day 2 — Saturday, 19 March 2022
Time (CET)	Division	Event	Round
9:30	M	60 Metres Hurdles	Heptathlon
9:50	W	60 Metres Hurdles	Heats
10:30	M	Pole Vault	Heptathlon
10:45	M	60 Metres	Heats
11:00	W	High Jump	Final
11:45	W	800 Metres	Heats
12:15	M	1500 Metres	Heats
18:05	W	Pole Vault	Final
18:15	W	60 Metres Hurdles	Semi-final
18:40	M	60 Metres	Semi-final
19:10	M	800 Metres	Final
19:30	M	1000 Metres	Heptathlon
19:40	M	Shot Put	Final
19:50	W	400 Metres	Final
20:10	M	400 Metres	Final
20:35	W	1500 Metres	Final
21:05	W	60 Metres Hurdles	Final
21:20	M	60 Metres	Final
Day 3 — Sunday, 20 March 2022
Time (CET)	Division	Event	Round
10:05	M	60 Metres Hurdles	Heats
10:45	M	High Jump	Final
11:00	W	Triple Jump	Final
11:10	W	4 × 400 Metres Relay	Heats
11:35	M	4 × 400 Metres Relay	Heats
12:05	M	3000 Metres	Final
16:35	M	Pole Vault	Final
17:05	M	60 Metres Hurdles	Semi-final
17:30	W	Long Jump	Final
18:05	W	800 Metres	Final
18:35	M	1500 Metres	Final
19:30	M	60 Metres Hurdles	Final
19:40	W	4 × 400 Metres Relay	Final
19:55	M	4 × 400 Metres Relay	Final

== Entry standards ==
Event	Men			Women			Athletes
Event	Indoor	Outdoor		Indoor	Outdoor		
60 metres	6.63	10.10	100 m	7.30	11.15	100 m	56
400 metres	46.50	45.00		52.90	51.00		30
800 metres	1:46.70	1:44.00		2:01.50	1:58.00		18
1500 metres	3:39.00	3:33.00	1500 m	4:09.00	4:02.00	1500 m	18
1500 metres	3:39.00	3:55.00	Mile	4:09.00	4:28.50	Mile	18
3000 metres	7:50.00	7:40.00	3000 m	8:49.00	8:30.00	3000 m	24 (men); 15 (women)
3000 metres	7:50.00	13:10.00	5000 m	8:49.00	14:50.00	5000 m	24 (men); 15 (women)
60 metres hurdles	7.72	13.40	110 m h	8.16	12.85	100 m h	48
High jump	2.34 m (7 ft 8 in)			1.97 m (6 ft 5 1/2 in)			12
Pole vault	5.81 m (19 ft 1/2 in)			4.75 m (15 ft 7 in)			12
Long jump	8.22 m (26 ft 11 1/2 in)			6.80 m (22 ft 3 1/2 in)			16
Triple jump	17.10 m (56 ft 1 in)			14.30 m (46 ft 10 3/4 in)			16
Shot put	21.10 m (69 ft 2 1/2 in)			18.30 m (60 ft 1/4 in)			16
4 × 400 metres relay	No Standard			No Standard			–
Indoor heptathlon / Indoor pentathlon	Winner of 2021 Combined Events Challenge; 5 best from 2021 outdoor list 5 best from 2022 indoor list 1 wild card						12

== Medal summary ==
=== Men ===
Event	Gold		Silver		Bronze	
60 metres	Marcell Jacobs; Italy	6.41 WL, AR	Christian Coleman; United States	6.41 WL	Marvin Bracy; United States	6.44 PB
400 metres	Jereem Richards; Trinidad and Tobago	45.00 CR, NR	Trevor Bassitt; United States	45.05 PB	Carl Bengtström; Sweden	45.33 NR
800 metres	Mariano García; Spain	1:46.20	Noah Kibet; Kenya	1:46.35	Bryce Hoppel; United States	1:46.51
1500 metres	Samuel Tefera; Ethiopia	3:32.77 CR	Jakob Ingebrigtsen; Norway	3:33.02	Abel Kipsang; Kenya	3:33.36 SB
3000 metres	Selemon Barega; Ethiopia	7:41:38	Lamecha Girma; Ethiopia	7:41:63	Marc Scott; Great Britain	7:42:02 SB
60 metres hurdles	Grant Holloway; United States	7.39	Pascal Martinot-Lagarde; France	7.50	Jarret Eaton; United States	7.53
4 × 400 metres relay	Belgium (BEL); Julien Watrin; Alexander Doom; Jonathan Sacoor; Kevin Borlée; Dylan Borlée	3:06.52 SB	Spain (ESP); Bruno Hortelano; Iñaki Cañal; Manuel Guijarro; Bernat Erta	3:06.82 SB	Netherlands (NED); Taymir Burnet; Nick Smidt; Terrence Agard; Tony van Diepen; Isayah Boers; Jochem Dobber	3:06.90 SB
High jump	Woo Sang-hyeok; South Korea	2.34 m	Loïc Gasch; Switzerland	2.31 m SB	Hamish Kerr; New Zealand	2.31 m NR
High jump	Woo Sang-hyeok; South Korea	2.34 m	Loïc Gasch; Switzerland	2.31 m SB	Gianmarco Tamberi; Italy	2.31 m SB
Pole vault	Armand Duplantis; Sweden	6.20 m WR	Thiago Braz; Brazil	5.95 m AR	Christopher Nilsen; United States	5.90 m
Long jump	Miltiadis Tentoglou; Greece	8.55 m WL	Thobias Montler; Sweden	8.38 m NR	Marquis Dendy; United States	8.27 m SB
Triple jump	Lázaro Martínez; Cuba	17.64 m WL	Pedro Pichardo; Portugal	17.46 m NR	Donald Scott; United States	17.21 m SB
Shot put	Darlan Romani; Brazil	22.53 m CR, AR	Ryan Crouser; United States	22.44 m	Tomas Walsh; New Zealand	22.31 m AR
Heptathlon	Damian Warner; Canada	6489 pts WL	Simon Ehammer; Switzerland	6363 pts NR	Ashley Moloney; Australia	6344 pts AR
WR world record | AR area record | CR championship record | GR games record | NR national record | OR Olympic record | PB personal best | SB season best | WL world leading (in a given season)

=== Women ===
Event	Gold		Silver		Bronze	
60 metres	Mujinga Kambundji; Switzerland	6.96 WL NR	Mikiah Brisco; United States	6.99 PB	Marybeth Sant-Price; United States	7.04 PB
400 metres	Shaunae Miller-Uibo; Bahamas	50.31 SB	Femke Bol; Netherlands	50.57	Stephenie Ann McPherson; Jamaica	50.79 NR
800 metres	Ajeé Wilson; United States	1:59.09 SB	Freweyni Hailu; Ethiopia	2:00.54 SB	Halimah Nakaayi; Uganda	2:00.66
1500 metres	Gudaf Tsegay; Ethiopia	3:57.19 CR	Axumawit Embaye; Ethiopia	4:02.29	Hirut Meshesha; Ethiopia	4:03.39
3000 metres	Lemlem Hailu; Ethiopia	8:41.82 SB	Elinor Purrier St. Pierre; United States	8:42.04	Ejgayehu Taye; Ethiopia	8:42.23
60 metres hurdles	Cyréna Samba-Mayela; France	7.78 NR	Devynne Charlton; Bahamas	7.81 NR	Gabbi Cunningham; United States	7.87
4 × 400 metres relay	Jamaica (JAM); Junelle Bromfield; Janieve Russell; Roneisha McGregor; Stephenie Ann McPherson; Tiffany James	3:28.40 SB	Netherlands (NED); Lieke Klaver; Eveline Saalberg; Lisanne de Witte; Femke Bol; Andrea Bouma	3:28.57 SB	Poland (POL); Natalia Kaczmarek; Iga Baumgart-Witan; Kinga Gacka; Justyna Święty-Ersetic; Aleksandra Gaworska	3:28.59 SB
High jump	Yaroslava Mahuchikh; Ukraine	2.02 m WL	Eleanor Patterson; Australia	2.00 m AR	Nadezhda Dubovitskaya; Kazakhstan	1.98 m AR
Pole vault	Sandi Morris; United States	4.80 m SB	Katie Nageotte; United States	4.75 m	Tina Šutej; Slovenia	4.75 m
Long jump	Ivana Vuleta; Serbia	7.06 m WL	Ese Brume; Nigeria	6.85 m SB	Lorraine Ugen; Great Britain	6.82 m SB
Triple jump	Yulimar Rojas; Venezuela	15.74 m WR	Maryna Bekh-Romanchuk; Ukraine	14.74 m PB	Kimberly Williams; Jamaica	14.62 m SB
Shot put	Auriol Dongmo; Portugal	20.43 m WL	Chase Ealey; United States	20.21 m AR	Jessica Schilder; Netherlands	19.48 m
Pentathlon	Noor Vidts; Belgium	4929 pts WL	Adrianna Sułek; Poland	4851 pts NR	Kendell Williams; United States	4680 pts SB
WR world record | AR area record | CR championship record | GR games record | NR national record | OR Olympic record | PB personal best | SB season best | WL world leading (in a given season)

== Medal table ==
* Host nation (Serbia)

Rank	Nation	Gold	Silver	Bronze	Total
1	Ethiopia (ETH)	4	3	2	9
2	United States (USA)	3	7	9	19
3	Belgium (BEL)	2	0	0	2
4	Switzerland (SUI)	1	2	0	3
5	Sweden (SWE)	1	1	1	3
6	Bahamas (BAH)	1	1	0	2
6	Brazil (BRA)	1	1	0	2
6	France (FRA)	1	1	0	2
6	Portugal (POR)	1	1	0	2
6	Spain (ESP)	1	1	0	2
6	Ukraine (UKR)	1	1	0	2
12	Jamaica (JAM)	1	0	2	3
13	Italy (ITA)	1	0	1	2
14	Canada (CAN)	1	0	0	1
14	Cuba (CUB)	1	0	0	1
14	Greece (GRE)	1	0	0	1
14	Serbia (SRB)*	1	0	0	1
14	South Korea (KOR)	1	0	0	1
14	Trinidad and Tobago (TTO)	1	0	0	1
14	Venezuela (VEN)	1	0	0	1
21	Netherlands (NED)	0	2	2	4
22	Australia (AUS)	0	1	1	2
22	Kenya (KEN)	0	1	1	2
22	Poland (POL)	0	1	1	2
25	Nigeria (NGR)	0	1	0	1
25	Norway (NOR)	0	1	0	1
27	Great Britain (GBR)	0	0	2	2
27	New Zealand (NZL)	0	0	2	2
29	Kazakhstan (KAZ)	0	0	1	1
29	Slovenia (SLO)	0	0	1	1
29	Uganda (UGA)	0	0	1	1
Totals (31 entries)		26	26	27	79

== Participating nations ==
In brackets the number of athletes participating.

- Albania (1)
- Algeria (2)
- Andorra (1)
- Argentina (1)
- ART (1)
- Australia (15)
- Austria (2)
- Azerbaijan (1)
- Bahamas (5)
- Bangladesh (1)
- Barbados (3)
- Belgium (20)
- Bermuda (1)
- Bolivia (1)
- Bosnia and Herzegovina (1)
- Botswana (1)
- Brazil (17)
- Bulgaria (1)
- British Virgin Islands (2)
- Burundi (1)
- Canada (18)
- Chad (1)
- Chile (1)
- China (1)
- Chinese Taipei (1)
- Colombia (1)
- Comoros (1)
- Croatia (2)
- Cuba (5)
- Cyprus (3)
- Czech Republic (13)
- Denmark (5)
- Dominica (1)
- Ecuador (5)
- Egypt (1)
- Eritrea (1)
- Estonia (5)
- Eswatini (1)
- Ethiopia (14)
- Finland (5)
- France (10)
- Gambia (1)
- Germany (16)
- Ghana (2)
- Gibraltar (1)
- Great Britain (30)
- Greece (6)
- Grenada (1)
- Guyana (4)
- Haiti (2)
- Hong Kong (1)
- Hungary (4)
- Iceland (2)
- India (3)
- Indonesia (1)
- Iran (2)
- Ireland (16)
- Israel (3)
- Italy (22)
- Ivory Coast (1)
- Jamaica (15)
- Japan (7)
- Kazakhstan (3)
- Kenya (9)
- Kosovo (1)
- Kuwait (1)
- Kyrgyzstan (1)
- Latvia (1)
- Liberia (2)
- Lebanon (1)
- Libya (1)
- Lithuania (2)
- Luxembourg (3)
- Madagascar (1)
- Maldives (1)
- Mali (1)
- Malta (2)
- Mauritius (1)
- Mexico (4)
- Moldova (1)
- Monaco (1)
- Montenegro (1)
- Morocco (5)
- Netherlands (20)
- New Zealand (5)
- Niger (1)
- Nigeria (6)
- North Macedonia (1)
- Norway (5)
- Oman (1)
- Pakistan (1)
- Paraguay (1)
- Peru (1)
- Philippines (1)
- Poland (23)
- Portugal (12)
- Puerto Rico (1)
- Qatar (2)
- Romania (10)
- Saudi Arabia (1)
- Senegal (1)
- Serbia (13)
- Seychelles (1)
- Sierra Leone (1)
- Singapore (1)
- Slovakia (7)
- Slovenia (7)
- South Africa (3)
- South Korea (1)
- South Sudan (1)
- Spain (25)
- Sudan (1)
- Sweden (14)
- Switzerland (10)
- Tajikistan (1)
- Tanzania (1)
- Togo (1)
- Trinidad and Tobago (4)
- Tunisia (1)
- Turks and Caicos Islands (1)
- Turkey (1)
- Uganda (2)
- Ukraine (6)
- United Arab Emirates (1)
- United States (52)
- United States Virgin Islands (1)
- Uruguay (1)
- Uzbekistan (2)
- Venezuela (3)
- Belarusian and Russian athletes are not allowed to compete at the event after a ban as a result of the Russian invasion of Ukraine.

== Concerns and criticisms ==
=== Kosovo's participation ===
Kosovo had one representative at the championships, Gresa Bakraći who competed at women's 1500 m event. Due a long-standing dispute over the country's independence from the host nation, Kosovo's flag was not shown on the big screen and not been included on the official competition website ran by the Organising Committee and hosted on the World Athletics domain.
