= Isayah Boers =

Dutch sprinter (born 1999)

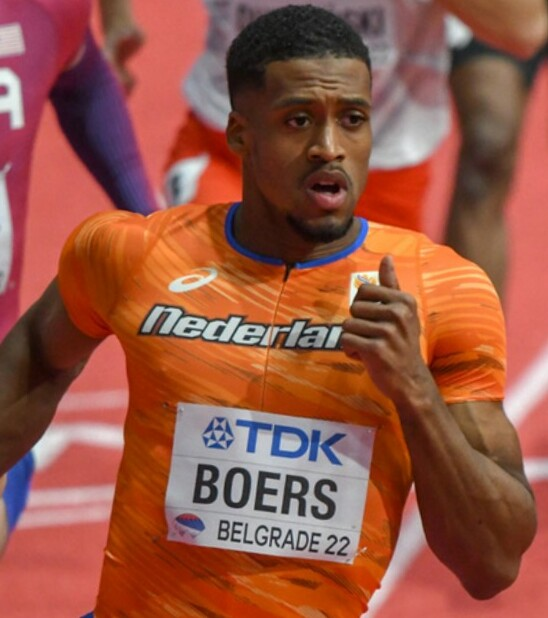
- Isayah Boers in 2022

Personal information
- Born: 19 June 1999 (age 27)

Sport
- Country: Netherlands
- Sport: Track and field

Achievements and titles
- Personal bests: Outdoor; 100 m: 10.46 (La Chaux-de-Fonds 2019); 200 m: 20.85 (La Chaux-de-Fonds 2021); 400 m: 45.58 (Bellinzona 2022); 800 m: 1:51.69 (L'Étang-Salé 2021); Indoor; 60 m: 6.82 (Apeldoorn 2022); 200 m: 20.89 (Metz 2023); 400 m: 45.72 (Apeldoorn 2023)
Medal record
Men's athletics
Representing Netherlands
World Indoor Championships
Bronze medal – third place	2022 Belgrade	4×400 m relay
World Athletics Relays
Silver medal – second place	2024 Nassau	4×400 m mixed
European Indoor Championships
Bronze medal – third place	2023 Istanbul	4×400 m relay

Isayah Boers (born 19 June 1999) is a Dutch sprinter, who specializes in the 400 metres.

Boers won the bronze medal at the 2022 World Athletics Indoor Championships in the 4 × 400 metres relay event. At the 2022 European Athletics Championships he finished fourth with the relay team in the 4 × 400 metres relay event. He won a bronze medal at the 2023 European Athletics Indoor Championships also in the 4 × 400 metres relay.
