= Athletics at the 2019 European Games – Mixed 4 x 400 metres relay =

Mixed 4 x 400 metres relay at the 2019 European Games
- Venue: Dinamo Stadium, Minsk
- Date: 23 June
- Winning time: 3:17.31

Medalists
gold medal	Danylo Danylenko, Tetyana Melnyk, Stanislav Senyk, Anna Ryzhykova	Ukraine
silver medal	Jan Tesař, Barbora Malíková, Lada Vondrová, Michal Desenský	Czech Republic
bronze medal	Ricardo dos Santos, Cátia Azevedo, Rivinilda Mentai, João Coelho	Portugal

The mixed 4 x 400 metres relay event at the 2019 European Games in Minsk took place on 23 June. The winners in this discipline were determined during the qualifications for Dynamic New Athletics.

== Results ==
Rank	Match	Lane	Nation	Athletes	Result	Notes
1st place, gold medalist(s)	4	2	Ukraine	Danylo Danylenko, Tetyana Melnyk, Stanislav Senyk, Anna Ryzhykova	3:17.31	
2nd place, silver medalist(s)	3	2	Czech Republic	Jan Tesař, Barbora Malíková, Lada Vondrová, Michal Desenský	3:19.05	
3rd place, bronze medalist(s)	4	5	Portugal	Ricardo dos Santos, Cátia Azevedo, Rivinilda Mentai, João Coelho	3:19.63	
4	4	6	Turkey	Yavuz Can, Emel Şanlı Kırcın, Derya Yıldırım, Batuhan Altıntaş	3:20.31	
5	2	4	Slovenia	Luka Janežič, Anita Horvat, Lovro Mesec Košir, Jerneja Smonkar	3:20.66	
6	2	5	Russia	Timofey Chalyy, Vyacheslav Kolesnichenko, Polina Miller, Vera Rudakova	3:21.02	
7	2	2	France	Loïc Naprix, Jean Bertin, Farah Clerc, Lénora Guion-Firmin	3:21.08	
8	1	4	Germany	Arne Leppelsack, Maximilian Grupen, Karolina Pahlitzsch, Corinna Schwab	3:21.90	
9	1	2	Slovakia	Martin Kučera, Šimon Bujna, Daniela Ledecká, Alexandra Štuková	3:22.65	
10	3	7	Belarus	Ihar Zubko, Krystsina Muliarchyk, Aliaksei Lazarau, Yuliya Kastsiuchkova	3:22.74	
11	4	7	Spain	Alberto Gavaldá, Gen Esteban San Millán, Bárbara Camblor, Carmen Sánchez	3:22.99	
12	2	6	Italy	Francesco Cappellin, Eusebio Haliti, Marta Milani, Ylenia Vitale	3:23.19	
13	3	3	Lithuania	Rokas Pacevičius, Modesta Justė Morauskaitė, Artūras Janauskas, Erika Krūminaitė	3:23.75	
14	1	7	Greece	Antonios Alexandridis, Elpida-Ioanna Karkalatou, Despoina Mourta, Panagiotis Trivyzas	3:24.26	
15	3	5	Ireland	Brandon Arrey, Sinead Denny, Catherine McManus, Andrew Mellon	3:24.37	
16	1	3	Switzerland	Luca Flück, Joel Burgunder, Daniela Kyburz, Rachel Pellaud	3:24.82	
17	2	7	Estonia	Helin Meier, Jaak-Heinrich Jagor, Marek Niit, Liis Roose	3:25.88	
18	2	3	Romania	Cristian Radu, Cristina Bălan, Sanda Belgyan, Mihai Pislaru	3:25.96	
19	1	6	Hungary	Boldizsár Boda, Evelin Nádházy, Virág Simon, Balázs Vindics	3:26.12	
20	4	4	Denmark	Gustav Lundholm Nielsen, Emma Bomme, Benjamin Lobo Vedel, Zarah Buchwald	3:27.68	
21	4	3	Bulgaria	Zhivko Stoyanov, Kristina Borukova, Nikolay Georgiev, Liliyana Georgieva	3:29.25	
22	3	4	Latvia	Iļja Petrušenko, Austris Karpinskis, Marija Medvedeva, Patrīcija Sarmule	3:30.40	
23	3	6	Poland	Aleksandra Lubicka, Bartłomiej Czajkowski, Mariola Karaś, Bartosz Rożnowski	3:31.60	
24	1	5	Cyprus	Stavros Spyrou, Konstantinos Christou, Christiana Katsari, Kalliopi Kountouri	3:32.61	
