= 2018 European Athletics Championships – Men's 400 metres =

Men's 400 metres at the 2018 European Athletics Championships
- Venue: Olympic Stadium
- Location: Berlin
- Dates: August 7 (round 1); August 8 (semifinals); August 10 (final)
- Competitors: 39 from 23 nations
- Winning time: 44.78

Medalists
| gold medal | Matthew Hudson-Smith | Great Britain |
| silver medal | Kevin Borlée | Belgium |
| bronze medal | Jonathan Borlée | Belgium |

The men's 400 metres at the 2018 European Athletics Championships took place at the Olympic Stadium on 7, 8, and 10 August.

== Records ==
Standing records prior to the 2018 European Athletics Championships
| World record | Wayde van Niekerk (RSA) | 43.03 | Rio de Janeiro, Brazil | 14 August 2016 |
| European record | Thomas Schönlebe (GDR) | 44.33 | Rome, Italy | 3 September 1987 |
| Championship record | Iwan Thomas (GBR) | 44.52 | Budapest, Hungary | 21 August 1998 |
| World Leading | Michael Norman (USA) | 43.61 | Eugene, United States | 8 June 2018 |
| European Leading | Matthew Hudson-Smith (GBR) | 44.63 | London, United Kingdom | 21 July 2018 |

== Schedule ==
| Date | Time | Round |
|---|---|---|
| 7 August 2018 | 10:35 | Round 1 |
| 8 August 2018 | 19:30 | Semifinals |
| 10 August 2018 | 21:05 | Final |

All times are local times (UTC+2)

== Results ==
=== Round 1 ===
First 3 in each heat (Q) and the next fastest 3 (q) advanced to the Semifinals.

| Rank | Heat | Lane | Name | Nationality | Time | Note |
|---|---|---|---|---|---|---|
| 1 | 2 | 8 | Jonathan Borlée | Belgium | 45.19 | Q, SB |
| 2 | 1 | 8 | Kevin Borlée | Belgium | 45.29 | Q, SB |
| 3 | 2 | 7 | Matteo Galvan | Italy | 45.48 | Q, SB |
| 4 | 1 | 6 | Ricardo dos Santos | Portugal | 45.55 | Q, NR |
| 5 | 2 | 6 | Jānis Leitis | Latvia | 45.56 | Q, NR |
| 6 | 2 | 4 | Samuel García | Spain | 45.63 | q |
| 7 | 4 | 6 | Dwayne Cowan | Great Britain | 45.75 | Q |
| 8 | 1 | 7 | Vitaliy Butrym | Ukraine | 45.82 | Q, SB |
| 9 | 1 | 2 | Pavel Maslák | Czech Republic | 45.83 | q |
| 10 | 3 | 1 | Dylan Borlée | Belgium | 45.84 | Q |
| 11 | 3 | 7 | Robert Parge | Romania | 45.99 | Q |
| 12 | 4 | 5 | Donald Sanford | Israel | 46.00 | Q |
| 13 | 4 | 3 | Patrick Schneider | Germany | 46.15 | Q |
| 14 | 4 | 4 | Łukasz Krawczuk | Poland | 46.17 | q |
| 15 | 2 | 3 | Dariusz Kowaluk | Poland | 46.18 | |
| 16 | 3 | 8 | Martyn Rooney | Great Britain | 46.27 | Q |
| 17 | 3 | 6 | Oleksiy Pozdnyakov | Ukraine | 46.47 | |
| 18 | 3 | 4 | Patrik Šorm | Czech Republic | 46.52 | |
| 19 | 3 | 2 | Johannes Trefz | Germany | 46.53 | |
| 20 | 1 | 3 | Yavuz Can | Turkey | 46.58 | |
| 21 | 4 | 7 | Michal Desenský | Czech Republic | 46.68 | |
| 22 | 1 | 1 | Christopher O'Donnell | Ireland | 46.81 | SB |
| 23 | 4 | 2 | Erik Martinsson | Sweden | 46.87 | |
| 24 | 4 | 8 | Batuhan Altıntaş | Turkey | 46.91 | |
| 25 | 2 | 5 | Stanislav Senyk | Ukraine | 47.10 | |
| 26 | 3 | 5 | Tony Nõu | Estonia | 47.19 | |
| 27 | 1 | 5 | Mateo Ružić | Croatia | 47.32 | |
| 28 | 2 | 2 | Franko Burraj | Albania | 47.56 | |
| 29 | 1 | 4 | Jessy Franco | Gibraltar | 48.12 | PB |
| 30 | 3 | 3 | Joel Burgunder | Switzerland | 48.78 | |

=== Semifinals ===
First 2 (Q) and next 2 fastest (q) qualify for the final.

| Rank | Heat | Lane | Name | Nationality | Time | Note |
|---|---|---|---|---|---|---|
| 1 | 1 | 4 | Matthew Hudson-Smith^{*} | Great Britain | 44.76 | Q |
| 2 | 1 | 5 | Jonathan Borlée | Belgium | 44.87 | Q, SB |
| 3 | 3 | 5 | Karsten Warholm^{*} | Norway | 44.91 | Q, SB |
| 4 | 3 | 6 | Luka Janežič^{*} | Slovenia | 44.93 | Q, SB |
| 5 | 3 | 3 | Kevin Borlée | Belgium | 45.07 | q, SB |
| 6 | 2 | 5 | Karol Zalewski^{*} | Poland | 45.11 | Q, PB |
| 7 | 1 | 7 | Ricardo dos Santos | Portugal | 45.14 | q, NR |
| 8 | 2 | 4 | Óscar Husillos^{*} | Spain | 45.17 | Q |
| 8 | 1 | 6 | Matteo Galvan | Italy | 45.17 | SB |
| 10 | 2 | 6 | Rabah Yousif^{*} | Great Britain | 45.30 | SB |
| 11 | 3 | 4 | Liemarvin Bonevacia^{*} | Netherlands | 45.39 | |
| 12 | 1 | 2 | Dwayne Cowan | Great Britain | 45.45 | SB |
| 13 | 1 | 3 | Lucas Búa^{*} | Spain | 45.48 | |
| 14 | 2 | 3 | Davide Re^{*} | Italy | 45.53 | |
| 14 | 2 | 8 | Jānis Leitis | Latvia | 45.53 | NR |
| 16 | 1 | 8 | Pavel Maslák | Czech Republic | 45.59 | SB |
| 17 | 2 | 7 | Dylan Borlée | Belgium | 45.63 | |
| 18 | 3 | 7 | Donald Blair-Sanford | Israel | 45.68 | |
| 19 | 3 | 1 | Martyn Rooney | Great Britain | 45.73 | SB |
| 20 | 1 | 1 | Łukasz Krawczuk | Poland | 45.78 | SB |
| 21 | 3 | 8 | Samuel García | Spain | 45.87 | |
| 22 | 3 | 2 | Vitaliy Butrym | Ukraine | 46.01 | |
| 23 | 2 | 1 | Robert Parge | Romania | 46.07 | |
| 24 | 2 | 2 | Patrick Schneider | Germany | 46.58 | |

*Athletes who received a bye to the semifinals

=== Final ===
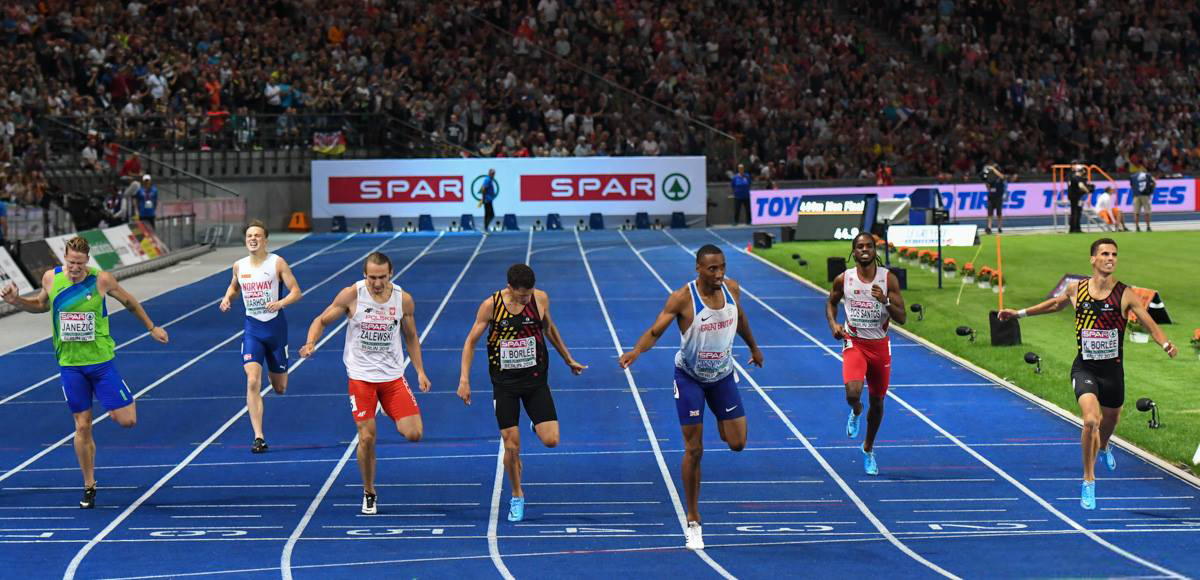
The finish

| Rank | Lane | Name | Nationality | Time | Note |
|---|---|---|---|---|---|
| 1st place, gold medalist(s) | 3 | Matthew Hudson-Smith | Great Britain | 44.78 | |
| 2nd place, silver medalist(s) | 1 | Kevin Borlée | Belgium | 45.13 | |
| 3rd place, bronze medalist(s) | 4 | Jonathan Borlée | Belgium | 45.19 | |
| 4 | 5 | Karol Zalewski | Poland | 45.34 | |
| 5 | 7 | Luka Janežič | Slovenia | 45.43 | |
| 6 | 8 | Óscar Husillos | Spain | 45.61 | |
| 7 | 2 | Ricardo dos Santos | Portugal | 45.78 | |
| 8 | 6 | Karsten Warholm | Norway | 46.68 | |
