= 2015 European Athletics Indoor Championships – Men's 400 metres =

The men's 400 metres event at the 2015 European Athletics Indoor Championships was held on 6 March at 11:00 (heats), 17:10 (semifinals) and on 7 March at 19:10 (final) local time.

== Medalists ==
Gold	Silver	Bronze
Pavel Maslák; Czech Republic	Dylan Borlée; Belgium	Rafał Omelko; Poland

== Results ==
=== Heats ===
Qualification: First 2 of each heat (Q) and the next 6 fastest (q) qualified for the semifinals.

Rank	Heat	Athlete	Nationality	Time	Note
1	4	Donald Blair-Sanford	Israel	46.81	Q
2	4	Rafał Omelko	Poland	46.95	Q
3	4	Luka Janežič	Slovenia	46.98	q
4	6	Dara Kervick	Ireland	47.03	Q
5	5	Jan Tesař	Czech Republic	47.09	Q
6	6	Łukasz Krawczuk	Poland	47.14	Q
7	6	Vitaliy Butrym	Ukraine	47.15	q
8	3	Pavel Maslák	Czech Republic	47.23	Q
9	1	Karol Zalewski	Poland	47.24	Q
10	4	Samuel García	Spain	47.26	q
11	5	Matteo Galvan	Italy	47.31	Q
12	3	Dylan Borlée	Belgium	47.36	Q
13	1	Aliaksandr Linnik	Belarus	47.40	Q, SB
14	1	Jarryd Dunn	Great Britain	47.47	q
14	2	Yavuz Can	Turkey	47.47	Q
16	5	Bjorn Blauwhof	Netherlands	47.52	q
17	3	Yevhen Hutsol	Ukraine	47.55	q
18	2	Patrik Šorm	Czech Republic	47.56	Q
19	1	Terrence Agard	Netherlands	47.59	
20	2	Lee-Marvin Bonevacia	Netherlands	47.62	
21	2	Pau Fradera	Spain	47.63	
22	1	Nick Ekelund-Arenander	Denmark	47.69	
23	4	Marek Niit	Estonia	47.79	
24	3	Erik Martinsson	Sweden	48.09	
25	2	Trausti Stefánsson	Iceland	48.28	
26	5	Vincent Karger	Luxembourg	48.37	
27	3	Benjamin Lobo Vedel	Denmark	48.44	
28	6	Mehmet Güzel	Turkey	48.55	
29	6	Alexander Gladitz	Germany	48.73	
30	6	Jānis Baltušs	Latvia	48.82	
31	2	Denis Danac	Slovakia	48.96	
32	4	Kolbeinn Hödur Gunnarsson	Iceland	49.21	
	5	Miloš Raović	Serbia	DNF	

=== Semifinals ===
Qualification: First 2 of each semifinal (Q) qualified directly for the final.

Rank	Heat	Athlete	Nationality	Time	Note
1	2	Pavel Maslák	Czech Republic	46.46	Q
2	2	Łukasz Krawczuk	Poland	46.71	Q
3	1	Dylan Borlée	Belgium	46.72	Q, PB
4	2	Aliaksandr Linnik	Belarus	46.78	NR
5	1	Matteo Galvan	Italy	46.82	Q
6	1	Karol Zalewski	Poland	46.84	
7	2	Dara Kervick	Ireland	46.96	
8	1	Jan Tesař	Czech Republic	47.11	
9	1	Jarryd Dunn	Great Britain	47.29	
10	3	Rafał Omelko	Poland	47.52	Q
11	3	Yevhen Hutsol	Ukraine	47.65	Q
12	3	Patrik Šorm	Czech Republic	47.70	
13	3	Yavuz Can	Turkey	47.81	
14	1	Samuel García	Spain	47.95	
15	2	Vitaliy Butrym	Ukraine	48.09	
16	2	Bjorn Blauwhof	Netherlands	48.38	
	3	Donald Blair-Sanford	Israel	DQ	R163.2
	3	Luka Janežič	Slovenia	DNS	

=== Final ===
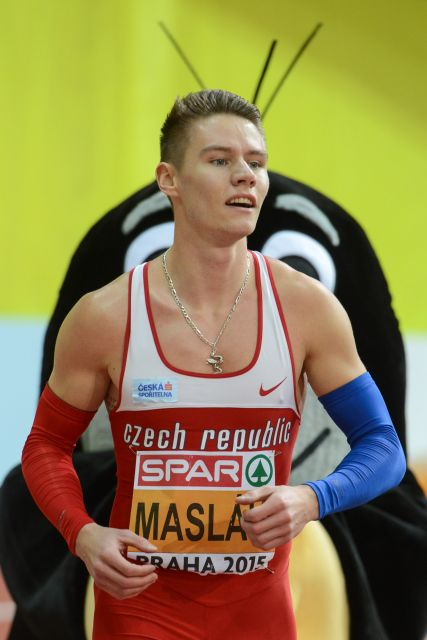
Pavel Maslák successfully defended his title from two years before.

Rank	Lane	Athlete	Nationality	Time	Note
1st place, gold medalist(s)	5	Pavel Maslák	Czech Republic	45.33	CR
2nd place, silver medalist(s)	6	Dylan Borlée	Belgium	46.25	PB
3rd place, bronze medalist(s)	4	Rafał Omelko	Poland	46.26	PB
4	3	Łukasz Krawczuk	Poland	46.31	PB
5	1	Yevhen Hutsol	Ukraine	46.73	
6	2	Matteo Galvan	Italy	46.87	
