= 2016 European Athletics Championships – Men's 4 × 400 metres relay =

Sports event

Men's 4 × 400 metres relay at the European Athletics Championships
- Venue: Olympic Stadium
- Location: Amsterdam
- Dates: 9 July (round 1); 10 July (final)
- Competitors: 68 from 16 nations
- Winning time: 3:01.10 EL

Medalists
gold medal	Julien Watrin; Jonathan Borlée; Dylan Borlée; Kevin Borlée; Robin Vanderbemden*	Belgium
silver medal	Łukasz Krawczuk; Kacper Kozłowski; Jakub Krzewina; Rafał Omelko; Michał Pietrzak*	Poland
bronze medal	Rabah Yousif; Delano Williams; Jack Green; Matthew Hudson-Smith; Nigel Levine*; Jarryd Dunn*	Great Britain

The men's 4 × 400 metres relay at the 2016 European Athletics Championships took place at the Olympic Stadium on 9 and 10 July.

== Records ==
Standing records prior to the 2016 European Athletics Championships
World record	United States; Andrew Valmon; Quincy Watts; Butch Reynolds; Michael Johnson	2:54.29	Stuttgart, Germany	22 August 1993
European record	Great Britain; Iwan Thomas; Jamie Baulch; Mark Richardson; Roger Black	2:56.60	Atlanta, United States	3 August 1996
Championship record	Great Britain; Paul Sanders; Kriss Akabusi; John Regis; Roger Black	2:58.22	Split, Yugoslavia	1 September 1990
World Leading	United States	3:00.96	Gainesville, United States	2 April 2016
European Leading	Turkey; Halit Kılıç; Yasmani Copello Escobar; Batuhan Altıntaş; Yavuz Can	3:02.22	Erzurum, Turkey	12 June 2016

== Schedule ==
Date	Time	Round
9 July 2016	19:15	Round 1
10 July 2016	18:50	Final

All times are local times (UTC+2)

== Results ==
=== Round 1 ===
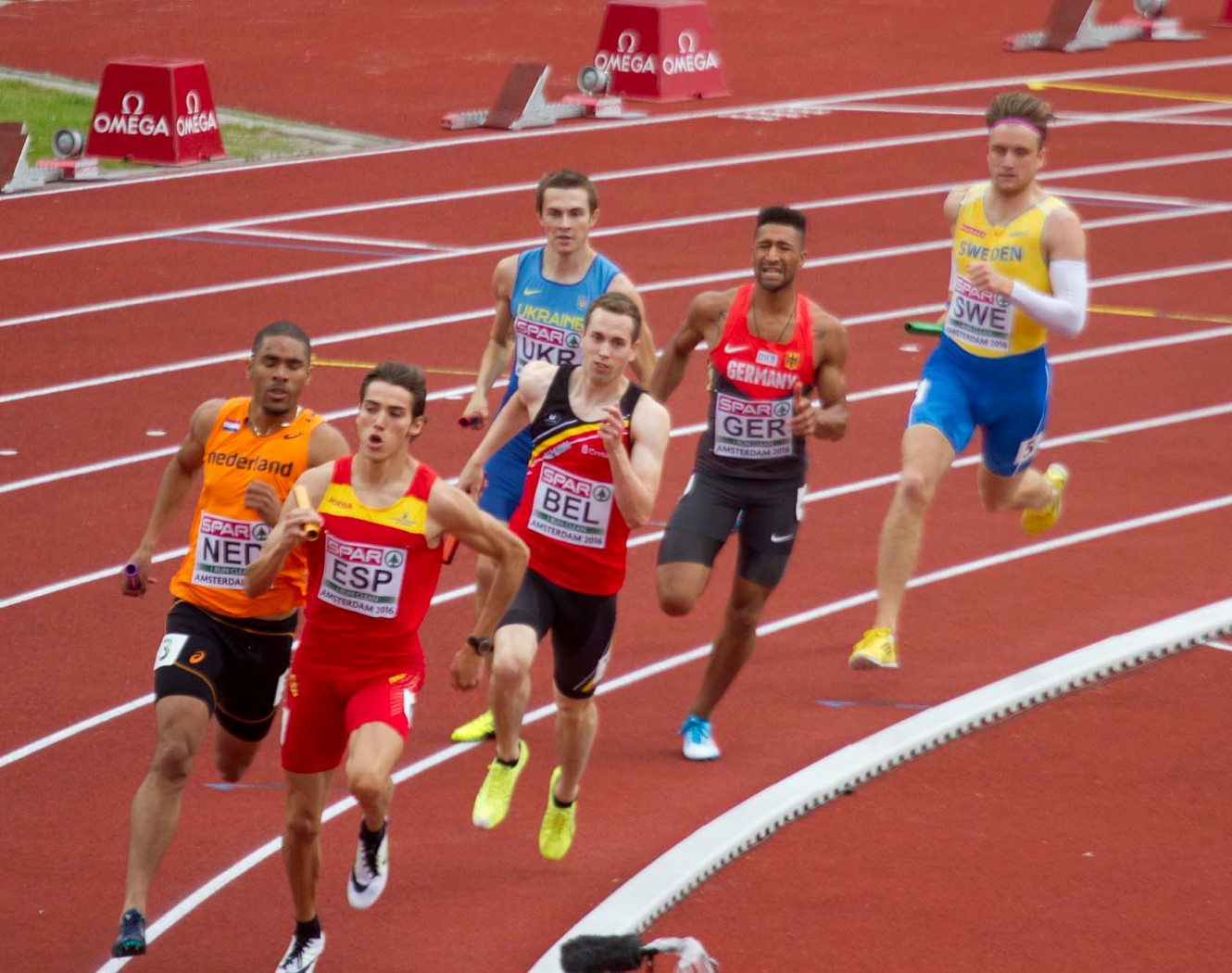
Second leg of heat 2

First 3 in each heat (Q) and 2 best performers (q) advance to the Final.

Rank	Heat	Nation	Athletes	Time	Notes
1	1	Great Britain	Rabah Yousif, Delano Williams, Nigel Levine, Jarryd Dunn	3:01.63	Q, EL
2	1	Poland	Michał Pietrzak, Kacper Kozłowski, Jakub Krzewina, Łukasz Krawczuk	3:02.09	Q, SB
3	1	Czech Republic	Jan Tesař, Pavel Maslák, Michal Desenský, Patrik Šorm	3:02.66	Q, NR
4	2	Belgium	Dylan Borlée, Robin Vanderbemden, Jonathan Borlée, Julien Watrin	3:03.15	Q, SB
5	2	Ukraine	Danylo Danylenko, Yevhen Hutsol, Volodymyr Burakov, Vitaliy Butrym	3:03.93	Q
6	2	Germany	Constantin Schmidt, Patrick Schneider, Kamghe Gaba, Johannes Trefz	3:03.97	Q, SB
7	2	Netherlands	Liemarvin Bonevacia, Terrence Agard, Bjorn Blauwhof, Maarten Stuivenberg	3:04.04	q
8	1	Ireland	Brian Gregan, Craig Lynch, David Gillick, Thomas Barr	3:04.42	q
9	1	Turkey	Halit Kılıç, Yasmani Copello, Batuhan Altıntaş, Yavuz Can	3:04.65	
10	2	Spain	Samuel García, Lucas Búa, Sergio Fernández, Lluis Vallejo	3:04.77	
11	2	Sweden	Axel Bergrahm, Erik Martinsson, Felix Francois, Adam Danielsson	3:04.95	SB
12	2	France	Mamadou Kasse Hann, Ludvy Vaillant, Alexandre Divet, Thomas Jordier	3:04.95	
13	1	Italy	Lorenzo Valentini, Michele Tricca, Mario Lambrughi, Matteo Galvan	3:06.07	SB
14	1	Switzerland	Luca Flück, Joel Burgunder, Daniele Angelella, Silvan Lutz	3:06.52	SB
15	2	Estonia	Jaak-Heinrich Jagor, Marek Niit, Rivar Tipp, Rauno Kunnapuu	3:10.63	SB
16	1	Norway	Karsten Warholm, Mauritz Kashagen, Josh-Kevin Ramirez Talm, Torbjørn Lysne	3:10.76	SB

=== Final ===
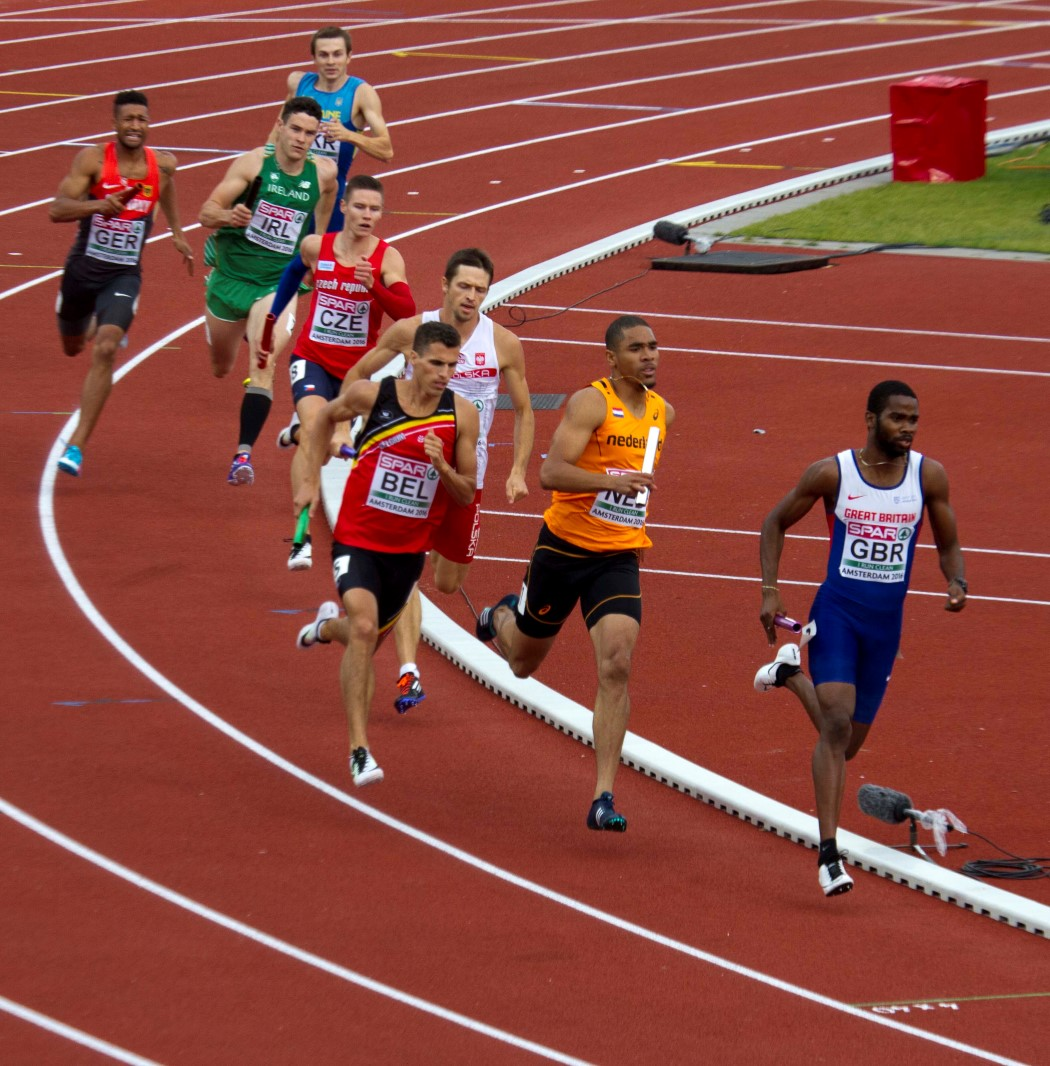
Second leg of the final

Rank	Lane	Nation	Athletes	Time	Notes
1st place, gold medalist(s)	5	Belgium	Julien Watrin, Jonathan Borlée, Dylan Borlée, Kevin Borlée	3:01.10	EL
2nd place, silver medalist(s)	4	Poland	Łukasz Krawczuk, Kacper Kozłowski, Jakub Krzewina, Rafał Omelko	3:01.18	SB
3rd place, bronze medalist(s)	3	Great Britain	Rabah Yousif, Delano Williams, Jack Green, Matthew Hudson-Smith	3:01.44	SB
4	8	Czech Republic	Jan Tesař, Pavel Maslák, Michal Desenský, Patrik Šorm	3:03.86	
5	2	Ireland	Brian Gregan, Craig Lynch, David Gillick, Thomas Barr	3:04.32	SB
6	6	Ukraine	Danylo Danylenko, Yevhen Hutsol, Volodymyr Burakov, Vitaliy Butrym	3:04.45	
7	1	Netherlands	Liemarvin Bonevacia, Terrence Agard, Bjorn Blauwhof, Maarten Stuivenberg	3:04.52	
8	7	Germany	Johannes Trefz, Patrick Schneider, Kamghe Gaba, Constantin Schmidt	3:05.67	
