= 2014 European Athletics Championships – Men's 400 metres =

Men's 400 metres at the European Athletics Championships

The men's 400 metres at the 2014 European Athletics Championships took place at the Letzigrund on 12, 13, and 15 August.

The winning margin was 0.04 seconds, which was also the winning margin in the men's 400 metres at the 1971, 1978 and 1986 editions of these championships. As of 2024, 0.04 seconds remains the narrowest winning margin for this event at these championships.

== Medalists ==
Gold	Martyn Rooney; Great Britain
Silver	Matthew Hudson-Smith; Great Britain
Bronze	Donald Sanford; Israel

== Records ==
Standing records prior to the 2014 European Athletics Championships
World record	Michael Johnson (USA)	43.18	Seville, Spain	26 August 1999
European record	Thomas Schönlebe (GDR)	44.33	Rome, Italy	3 September 1987
Championship record	Iwan Thomas (GBR)	44.52	Budapest, Hungary	21 August 1998
World Leading	Kirani James (GRN)	43.74	Lausanne, Switzerland	3 July 2014
European Leading	Pavel Maslák (CZE)	44.79	Doha, Qatar	9 May 2014
Broken records during the 2014 European Athletics Championships
European Leading	Martyn Rooney (GBR)	44.71	Zürich, Switzerland	15 August 2014

== Schedule ==
Date	Time	Round
12 August 2014	12:46	Round 1
13 August 2014	18:54	Semifinal
15 August 2014	18:50	Final

All times are local times (UTC+2)

== Results ==
=== Round 1 ===
First 4 in each heat (Q) and 4 best performers (q) advance to the Semifinals.

Rank	Heat	Lane	Name	Nationality	Time	Note
1	2	4	Maksim Dyldin	Russia	45.45	Q, SB
2	5	8	Martyn Rooney	Great Britain	45.48	Q
3	1	2	Mame-Ibra Anne	France	45.57	Q
4	2	6	Liemarvin Bonevacia	Netherlands	45.65	Q
5	3	3	Jakub Krzewina	Poland	45.68	Q
6	1	7	Kevin Borlée	Belgium	45.72	Q
7	2	5	Marek Niit	Estonia	45.74	Q, NR
8	2	8	Jonathan Borlée	Belgium	45.77	Q
9	5	5	Samuel García	Spain	45.80	Q
10	5	1	Kamghe Gaba	Germany	45.80	Q
11	3	2	Ricardo dos Santos	Portugal	45.81	Q, NR
12	3	7	Conrad Williams	Great Britain	45.90	Q
13	5	6	Nick Ekelund-Arenander	Denmark	45.91	Q
14	1	8	Łukasz Krawczuk	Poland	45.92	Q
15	1	4	Pavel Trenikhin	Russia	46.03	Q
16	4	3	Matthew Hudson-Smith	Great Britain	46.07	Q
17	2	2	Rafał Omelko	Poland	46.10	q
18	5	3	Miloš Raović	Serbia	46.12	q
19	4	4	Donald Sanford	Israel	46.18	Q
20	2	7	Richard Morrissey	Ireland	46.20	q, PB
21	3	8	Yannick Fonsat	France	46.23	Q
22	1	6	Vitaliy Butrym	Ukraine	46.30	q
23	3	4	Julien Watrin	Belgium	46.31	
24	4	6	Brian Gregan	Ireland	46.33	Q
25	3	5	Davide Re	Italy	46.34	
26	2	3	Patrik Šorm	Czech Republic	46.35	
27	1	3	Daniel Němeček	Czech Republic	46.47	
28	5	7	Lorenzo Valentini	Italy	46.61	
29	4	5	Matteo Galvan	Italy	46.64	Q
30	4	8	Jan Tesař	Czech Republic	46.65	
31	5	4	Karsten Warholm	Norway	46.73	
32	4	7	Yavuz Can	Turkey	46.90	
33	4	2	Johan Wissman	Sweden	46.93	
34	3	6	Yevhen Hutsol	Ukraine	46.96	
35	1	5	Bálint Móricz	Hungary	47.04	
36	1	1	Mateo Ružić	Croatia	47.06	
37	3	1	Batuhan Altıntaş	Turkey	47.35	
38	2	1	Željko Vincek	Croatia	48.32	
39	5	2	Fabian Haldner	Liechtenstein	50.55	
40	4	1	Karl Baldachino	Gibraltar	55.09	

=== Semifinal ===
First 2 in each heat (Q) and 2 best performers (q) advance to the Final.

Rank	Heat	Lane	Name	Nationality	Time	Note
1	3	3	Matthew Hudson-Smith	Great Britain	45.30	Q
2	3	8	Jonathan Borlée	Belgium	45.38	Q
3	3	5	Donald Sanford	Israel	45.39	q, NR
4	2	6	Martyn Rooney	Great Britain	45.40	Q
5	3	4	Jakub Krzewina	Poland	45.47	q
6	2	5	Samuel García	Spain	45.58	Q
7	2	4	Ricardo dos Santos	Portugal	45.74	NR
8	3	6	Mame-Ibra Anne	France	45.79	
9	2	3	Marek Niit	Estonia	45.80	
10	3	7	Brian Gregan	Ireland	45.81	SB
11	1	8	Conrad Williams	Great Britain	45.85	Q
12	1	6	Kamghe Gaba	Germany	46.01	Q
13	1	4	Maksim Dyldin	Russia	46.05	
14	3	2	Miloš Raović	Serbia	46.09	
15	1	3	Kevin Borlée	Belgium	46.15	
16	2	7	Łukasz Krawczuk	Poland	46.24	
17	2	2	Matteo Galvan	Italy	46.32	
18	1	5	Liemarvin Bonevacia	Netherlands	46.38	
19	2	8	Pavel Trenikhin	Russia	46.40	
20	2	1	Richard Morrissey	Ireland	46.64	
21	1	1	Rafał Omelko	Poland	46.69	
22	1	2	Yannick Fonsat	France	46.83	
23	1	7	Nick Ekelund-Arenander	Denmark	47.16	
24	3	1	Vitaliy Butrym	Ukraine	48.16	

=== Final ===
Rank	Lane	Name	Nationality	Time	Note
1st place, gold medalist(s)	3	Martyn Rooney	Great Britain	44.71	EL
2nd place, silver medalist(s)	6	Matthew Hudson-Smith	Great Britain	44.75	PB
3rd place, bronze medalist(s)	2	Donald Sanford	Israel	45.27	NR
4	1	Jakub Krzewina	Poland	45.52	
5	5	Conrad Williams	Great Britain	45.53	
6	7	Kamghe Gaba	Germany	45.83	
7	8	Samuel García	Spain	46.35	
	4	Jonathan Borlée	Belgium	DNS	
