= 2016 European Athletics Championships – Men's 400 metres =

Men's 400 metres at the 2016 European Athletics Championships
- Venue: Olympic Stadium
- Location: Amsterdam
- Dates: 6 July (heats); 7 July (semifinals); 8 July (final)
- Competitors: 32 from 17 nations
- Winning time: 45.29

Medalists
gold medal	Martyn Rooney	Great Britain
silver medal	Pavel Maslák	Czech Republic
bronze medal	Liemarvin Bonevacia	Netherlands

The men's 400 metres at the 2016 European Athletics Championships took place at the Olympic Stadium on 6, 7, and 8 July.

== Records ==
Standing records prior to the 2016 European Athletics Championships
World record	Michael Johnson (USA)	43.18	Seville, Spain	26 August 1999
European record	Thomas Schönlebe (GDR)	44.33	Rome, Italy	3 September 1987
Championship record	Iwan Thomas (GBR)	44.52	Budapest, Hungary	21 August 1998
World Leading	Kirani James (GRN)	44.08	Des Moines, United States	29 April 2016
European Leading	Matthew Hudson-Smith (GBR)	44.88	Birmingham, United Kingdom	26 June 2016

== Schedule ==
Date	Time	Round
6 July 2016	13:35	Round 1
7 July 2016	16:45	Semifinal
8 July 2016	19:50	Final

All times are local times (UTC+2)

== Results ==
=== Round 1 ===
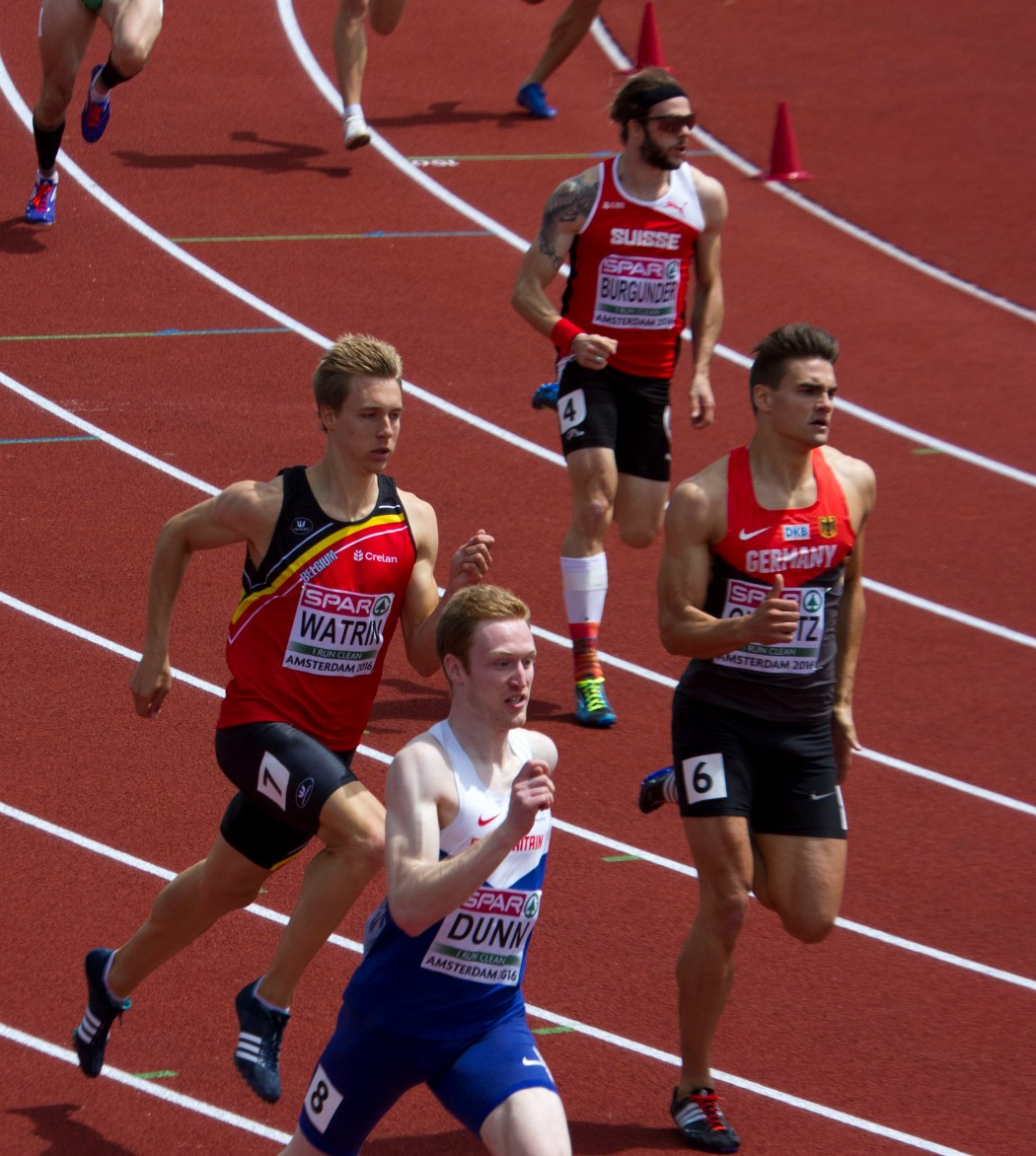
Heat 1

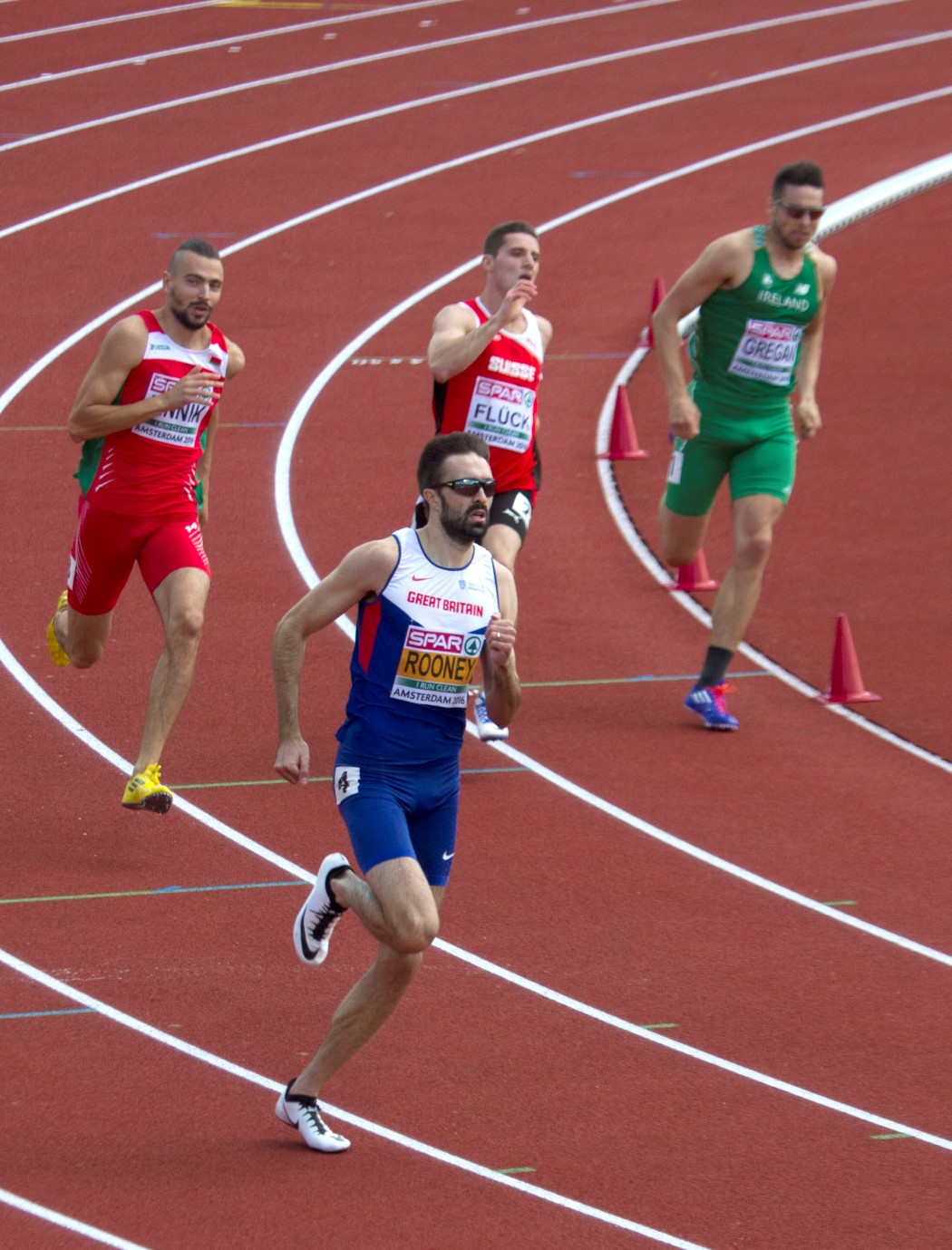
Heat 3

First 4 in each heat (Q) and the next fastest 3 (q) advanced to the Semifinals.

Rank	Heat	Lane	Name	Nationality	Time	Note
1	1	8	Jarryd Dunn	Great Britain	46.05	Q
2	1	7	Julien Watrin	Belgium	46.10	Q
3	1	6	Alexander Gladitz	Germany	46.28	Q
4	3	4	Martyn Rooney	Great Britain	46.57	Q
5	3	5	Mame-Ibra Anne	France	46.73	Q
6	1	1	Vitaliy Butrym	Ukraine	46.77	Q
7	3	7	Mateo Ružić	Croatia	46.89	Q
8	3	8	Łukasz Krawczuk	Poland	46.94	Q
9	1	4	Joel Burgunder	Switzerland	46.98	q
10	2	5	Lucas Búa	Spain	47.00	Q
11	3	1	Brian Gregan	Ireland	47.02	q
12	2	6	Jakub Krzewina	Poland	47.09	Q
12	3	3	Aliaksandr Linnik	Belarus	47.09	q
14	2	4	Thomas Jordier	France	47.14	Q
15	1	5	Batuhan Altıntaş	Turkey	47.23	
16	2	7	Johannes Trefz	Germany	47.32	Q
17	2	3	Yevhen Hutsol	Ukraine	47.35	
18	2	2	Jonathan Borlée	Belgium	47.45	
19	3	6	Danylo Danylenko	Ukraine	47.49	
20	1	3	Craig Lynch	Ireland	47.61	
21	1	2	Giuseppe Leonardi	Italy	47.68	
22	2	8	David Gillick	Ireland	47.81	
23	3	2	Luca Flück	Switzerland	47.97	

=== Semifinal ===
First 2 (Q) and next 2 fastest (q) qualify for the final.

Rank	Heat	Lane	Name	Nationality	Time	Note
1	2	7	Martyn Rooney	Great Britain	45.04	Q, SB
2	2	6	Matteo Galvan*	Italy	45.12	Q, =NR
3	2	5	Rafał Omelko*	Poland	45.14	q, PB
4	1	5	Kevin Borlée*	Belgium	45.26	Q
5	1	4	Pavel Maslák*	Czech Republic	45.31	Q, SB
6	2	8	Mame-Ibra Anne	France	45.39	q, SB
7	2	3	Yavuz Can*	Turkey	45.51	NR
8	3	5	Luka Janežič*	Slovenia	45.63	Q
9	3	3	Liemarvin Bonevacia*	Netherlands	45.68	Q, SB
10	2	4	Julien Watrin	Belgium	45.76	
11	1	6	Aliaksandr Linnik	Belarus	45.80	
12	1	8	Łukasz Krawczuk	Poland	45.86	SB
13	3	4	Donald Blair-Sanford*	Israel	45.90	
14	3	2	Jarryd Dunn	Great Britain	46.00	SB
15	1	2	Johannes Trefz	Germany	46.07	
16	1	7	Vitaliy Butrym	Ukraine	46.07	
17	3	6	Thomas Jordier	France	46.24	
18	3	7	Lucas Búa	Spain	46.26	
19	1	1	Brian Gregan	Ireland	46.37	
20	1	3	Samuel García*	Spain	46.43	
21	3	1	Jakub Krzewina	Poland	46.50	
22	3	8	Alexander Gladitz	Germany	46.57	
23	2	2	Mateo Ružić	Croatia	47.19	
24	2	1	Joel Burgunder	Switzerland	47.23	

*Athletes who received a bye to the semifinals

=== Final ===
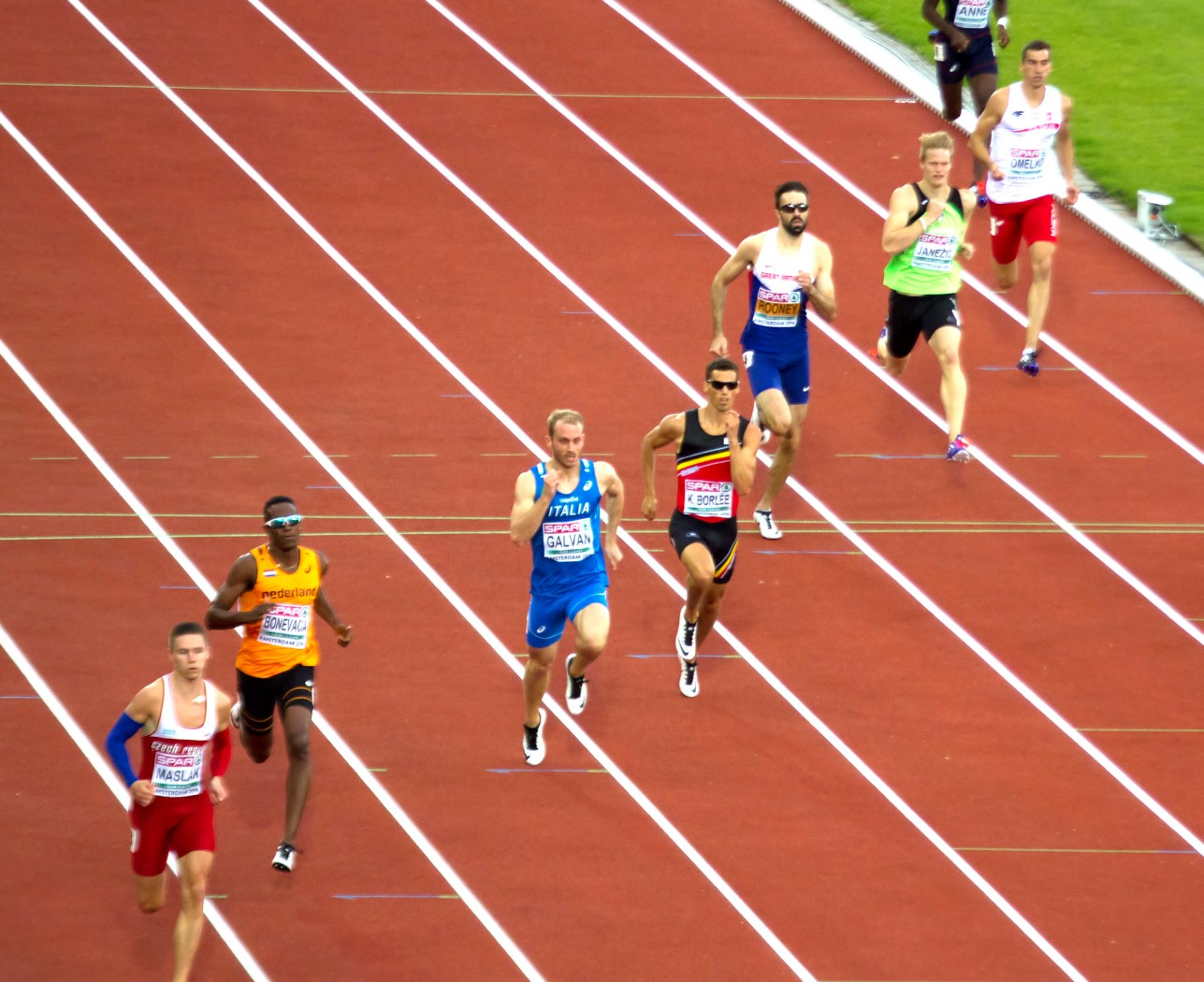
The final

Rank	Lane	Name	Nationality	Time	Note
1st place, gold medalist(s)	9	Martyn Rooney	Great Britain	45.29	
2nd place, silver medalist(s)	4	Pavel Maslák	Czech Republic	45.36	
3rd place, bronze medalist(s)	2	Liemarvin Bonevacia	Netherlands	45.41	SB
4	7	Kevin Borlée	Belgium	45.60	
5	6	Luka Janežič	Slovenia	45.65	
6	5	Rafał Omelko	Poland	45.67	
7	8	Mame-Ibra Anne	France	45.75	
8	3	Matteo Galvan	Italy	45.80	
