= Thomas Jordier =

French sprinter (born 1994)

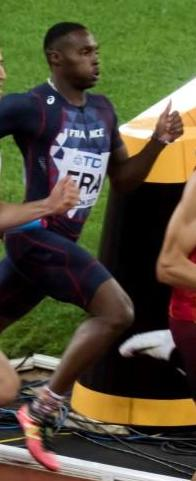
- Jordier in 2017

Personal information
- Born: 12 August 1994 (age 32) Noisy-le-Sec, France
- Height: 1.70 m (5 ft 7 in)
- Weight: 65 kg (143 lb)

Sport
- Sport: Track and field
- Event: 400 metres
- Club: Tremblay AC Athlétisme
- Coached by: Randy Fondelot
Medal record
Men's athletics
Representing France
European Championships
| Bronze medal – third place | 2014 Zürich | 4×400 m relay |
| Bronze medal – third place | 2022 Munich | 4x400 m relay |
European Indoor Championships
| Bronze medal – third place | 2019 Glasgow | 4×400 m relay |
European Team Championships
| Silver medal – second place | 2014 Braunschweig | 4x400 m relay |
| Silver medal – second place | 2019 Bydgoszcz | 4x400 m relay |

Thomas Jordier (born 12 August 1994 in Noisy-le-Sec) is a French sprinter specialising in the 400 metres. He won two gold medals at the 2015 European U23 Championships.

His personal bests in the event are 45.37 seconds outdoor (2022 European Athletics Championship ) and 46.68 seconds indoors (Nantes 2014).

== Competition record ==
| Year | Competition | Venue | Position | Event | Notes |
Representing France
| 2011 | World Youth Championships | Lille, France | 7th | 400 m | 47.27 |
| 2011 | World Youth Championships | Lille, France | 3rd | Medley relay | 1:51.81 |
| 2013 | European Indoor Championships | Gothenburg, Sweden | – | 400 m | DQ |
| 2013 | European Junior Championships | Rieti, Italy | 3rd | 400 m | 46.21 |
| 2013 | European Junior Championships | Rieti, Italy | 4th | 4 × 400 m relay | 3:05.41 |
| 2014 | World Relays | Nassau, Bahamas | 10th (h) | 4 × 400 m relay | 3:03.74 |
| 2014 | European Championships | Zürich, Switzerland | 3rd | 4 × 400 m relay | 2:59.89 |
| 2015 | World Relays | Nassau, Bahamas | 10th (h) | 4 × 400 m relay | 3:03.88 |
| 2015 | European U23 Championships | Tallinn, Estonia | 1st | 400 m | 45.50 |
| 2015 | European U23 Championships | Tallinn, Estonia | 1st | 4 × 400 m relay | 3:04.92 |
| 2015 | World Championships | Beijing, China | 6th | 4 × 400 m relay | 3:00.65 |
| 2016 | European Championships | Amsterdam, Netherlands | 17th (sf) | 400 m | 46.24 |
| 2016 | European Championships | Amsterdam, Netherlands | 12th (h) | 4 × 400 m relay | 3:04.95 |
| 2016 | Olympic Games | Rio de Janeiro, Brazil | 9th (h) | 4 × 400 m relay | 3:00.82 |
| 2017 | European Indoor Championships | Belgrade, Serbia | 7th (h) | 400 m | 47.49 |
| 2017 | European Indoor Championships | Belgrade, Serbia | 4th | 4 × 400 m relay | 3:08.99 |
| 2017 | World Relays | Nassau, Bahamas | 8th | 4 × 400 m relay | 3:06.33 |
| 2017 | World Championships | London, United Kingdom | 8th | 4 × 400 m relay | 3:01.79 |
| 2018 | European Championships | Berlin, Germany | 4th | 4 × 400 m relay | 3:02.08 |
| 2019 | European Indoor Championships | Glasgow, United Kingdom | 3rd | 4 × 400 m relay | 3:07.71 |
| 2019 | World Relays | Yokohama, Japan | 2nd (B) | 4 × 400 m relay | 3:02.99 |
| 2019 | World Championships | Doha, Qatar | 7th | 4 × 400 m relay | 3:03.06 |
| 2021 | European Indoor Championships | Toruń, Poland | – | 400 m | DQ |
| 2021 | World Relays | Chorzów, Poland | 7th (h) | 4 × 400 m relay | 3:04.78 |
| 2021 | Olympic Games | Tokyo, Japan | 11th (h) | 4 × 400 m relay | 3:00.81 |
| 2022 | World Championships | Eugene, United States | 7th | 4 × 400 m relay | 3:01.35 |
| 2022 | European Championships | Munich, Germany | 8th | 400 m | 45.67 |
| 2022 | European Championships | Munich, Germany | 3rd | 4 × 400 m relay | 2:59.64 |
