= Lucas Búa =

Spanish sprinter

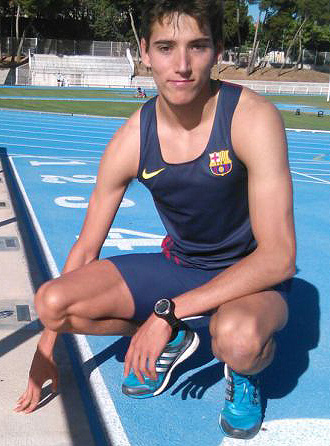
- Lucas Búa in 2015

Personal information
- Born: 12 January 1994 (age 32) Toledo, Spain
- Height: 1.85 m (6 ft 1 in)
- Weight: 70 kg (154 lb)

Sport
- Sport: Athletics
- Event: 400 m
- Club: FC Barcelona
- Coached by: Juan Antonio Rosique
Medal record
Men's athletics
Representing Spain
European Championships
Bronze medal – third place	2018 Berlin	4×400 m relay
European Indoor Championships
Silver medal – second place	2019 Glasgow	4×400 m relay
Mediterranean Games
Silver medal – second place	2018 Tarragona	400 m

Lucas Búa de Miguel (born 12 January 1994) is a Spanish sprinter specialising in the 400 metres. He competed at the 2016 IAAF World Indoor Championships narrowly missing the semifinals. His personal bests in the event are 45.98 seconds outdoors (Castellón 2015) and 46.65 seconds indoors (Madrid 2016).

== Competition record ==
Year	Competition	Venue	Position	Event	Notes
Representing Spain
2011	European Youth Olympic Festival	Lille, France	29th (h)	400 m	49.04
2011	European Youth Olympic Festival	Lille, France	14th (h)	Medley relay	1:57.23
2011	World Youth Championships	Trabzon, Turkey	7th	400 m	49.75
2012	World Junior Championships	Barcelona, Spain	54th (h)	400 m	48.94
2012	World Junior Championships	Barcelona, Spain	15th (h)	4 × 400 m relay	3:14.85
2013	European Junior Championships	Rieti, Italy	27th (h)	400 m	49.24
2014	Mediterranean U23 Championship	Aubagne, France	4th (h)	400 m	48.24
2014	Mediterranean U23 Championship	Aubagne, France	3rd	4 × 400 m relay	3:08.46
2014	European Championships	Zürich, Switzerland	9th (h)	4 × 400 m relay	3:04.68
2015	IAAF World Relays	Nassau, Bahamas	22nd (h)	4 × 400 m relay	3:08.49
2015	European U23 Championships	Tallinn, Estonia	12th (h)	400 m	46.73
2016	World Indoor Championships	Portland, United States	12th (h)	400 m	46.86
2016	European Championships	Amsterdam, Netherlands	18th (sf)	400 m	46.26
2016	European Championships	Amsterdam, Netherlands	10th (h)	4 × 400 m relay	3:04.77
2017	European Indoor Championships	Belgrade, Serbia	5th	400 m	46.74
2017	World Championships	London, United Kingdom	34th (h)	400 m	46.00
2017	World Championships	London, United Kingdom	5th	4 × 400 m relay	3:00.65
2018	World Indoor Championships	Birmingham, United Kingdom	15th (sf)	400 m	47.14
2018	World Indoor Championships	Birmingham, United Kingdom	7th (h)	4 × 400 m relay	3:07.52
2018	Mediterranean Games	Tarragona, Spain	2nd	400 m	45.91
2018	Mediterranean Games	Tarragona, Spain	2nd	4 × 400 m relay	3:04.71
2018	European Championships	Berlin, Germany	13th (sf)	400 m	45.48
2018	European Championships	Berlin, Germany	3rd	4 × 400 m relay	3:00.78
2019	European Indoor Championships	Glasgow, United Kingdom	6th	400 m	46.92
2019	European Indoor Championships	Glasgow, United Kingdom	2nd	4 × 400 m relay	3:06.32
2021	European Indoor Championships	Toruń, Poland	12th (h)	400 m	46.92
2021	World Relays	Chorzów, Poland	13th (h)	4 × 400 m relay	3:06.09
2022	European Championships	Munich, Germany	4th	4 × 400 m relay	3:00.54
2023	European Indoor Championships	Istanbul, Turkey	4th	4 × 400 m relay	3:06.87
2024	World Relays	Nassau, Bahamas	22nd (h)	4 × 400 m relay	3:06.84
