= Jan Tesař (athlete) =

Czech sprinter

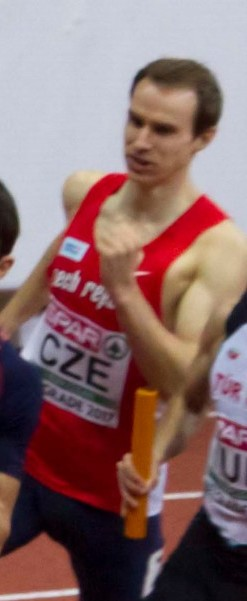

Personal information
- Born: 26 March 1990 (age 36)
- Education: Czech Technical University

Sport
- Sport: Athletics
- Event: 400 metres

Jan Tesař (born 26 March 1990) is a Czech sprinter specialising in the 400 metres. He won the bronze medal in the 4 × 400 metres relay at the 2015 European Indoor Championships which took place in Prague.

His personal bests in the 400 metres are 46.65 seconds outdoors (Zürich 2014) and 46.21 seconds indoors (Prague 2015). He improved his PB significantly to 45.73 when winning bronze at the 2015 Universiade.

== Competition record ==
Year	Competition	Venue	Position	Event	Notes
Representing the Czech Republic
2012	European Championships	Helsinki, Finland	20th (sf)	400 m	47.27
2013	World Championships	Moscow, Russia	19th (h)	4 × 400 m relay	3:04.54
2014	European Championships	Zürich, Switzerland	30th (h)	400 m	46.65
2014	European Championships	Zürich, Switzerland	8th	4 × 400 m relay	3:04.56
2015	European Indoor Championships	Prague, Czech Republic	8th (sf)	400 m	47.11
2015	European Indoor Championships	Prague, Czech Republic	3rd	4 × 400 m relay	3:04.09
2015	Universiade	Gwangju, South Korea	3rd	400 m	45.73
2016	European Championships	Amsterdam, Netherlands	4th	4 × 400 m relay	3:03.86
2017	European Indoor Championships	Belgrade, Serbia	8th (sf)	400 m	47.64
2017	European Indoor Championships	Belgrade, Serbia	3rd	4 × 400 m relay	3:08.60
2017	World Relays	Nassau, Bahamas	4th (B)	4 × 400 m relay	3:08.17
2017	Universiade	Taipei, Taiwan	11th (sf)	400 m	46.77
2017	Universiade	Taipei, Taiwan	3rd	4 × 400 m relay	3:08.14
2018	European Championships	Berlin, Germany	7th	4 × 400 m relay	3:03.00
2019	European Indoor Championships	Glasgow, United Kingdom	21st (h)	400 m	1:26.29
2019	World Relays	Yokohama, Japan	3rd (B)	4 × 400 m relay	3:03.79
2019	European Games	Minsk, Belarus	2nd	mixed 4 × 400 m relay	3:17.53
2019	World Championships	Doha, Qatar	11th (h)	4 × 400 m relay	3:02.97
