= Patrik Šorm =

Czech sprinter

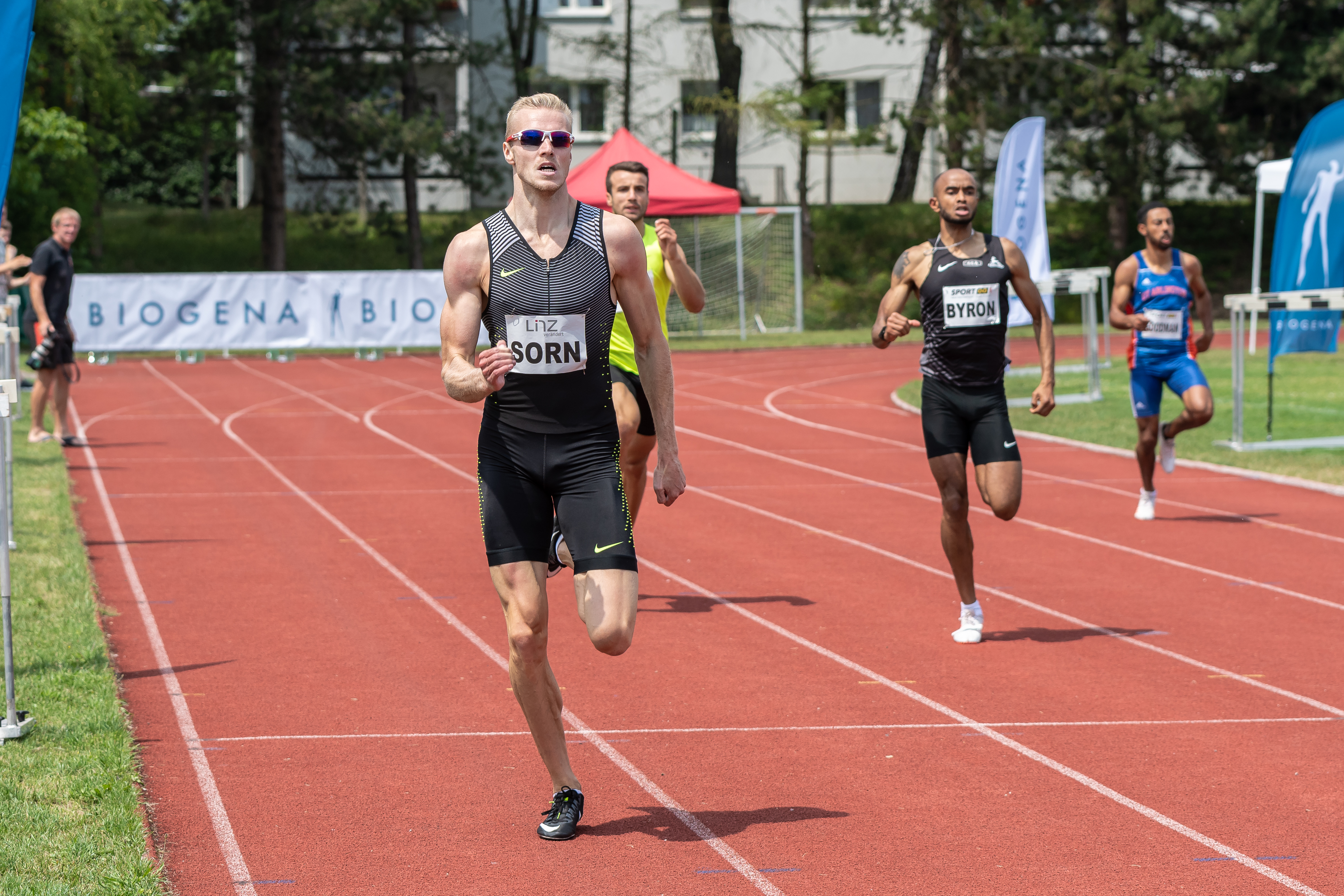

Personal information
- Born: 21 November 1993 (age 32) Prague, Czech Republic
- Height: 195 cm (6 ft 5 in)
- Weight: 81 kg (179 lb)

Sport
- Sport: Athletics
- Event: 400 m
- Club: TJ Dukla Praha
Medal record
Men's athletics
Representing the Czech Republic
World Championships
| Bronze medal – third place | 2023 Budapest | 4×400 m mixed |
European Indoor Championships
| Silver medal – second place | 2021 Toruń | 4×400 m relay |
| Bronze medal – third place | 2015 Prague | 4×400 m relay |
| Bronze medal – third place | 2017 Belgrade | 4×400 m relay |

Patrik Šorm (born 21 November 1993) is a Czech sprinter specialising in the 400 metres. He won the bronze medal in the 4 × 400 metres relay at the 2015, 2017 European Indoor Championships and silver medal 2021.

== International competitions ==
| Year | Competition | Venue | Position | Event | Notes |
Representing the Czech Republic
| 2011 | European Junior Championships | Tallinn, Estonia | 5th | 4 × 400 m relay | 3:10.20 |
| 2013 | European U23 Championships | Tampere, Finland | 6th | 4 × 400 m relay | 3:05.82 |
| 2014 | European Championships | Zurich, Switzerland | 26th (h) | 400 m | 46.35 |
| 2014 | European Championships | Zurich, Switzerland | 8th | 4 × 400 m relay | 3:04.56 |
| 2015 | European Indoor Championships | Prague, Czech Republic | 12th (sf) | 400 m | 47.70 |
| 2015 | European Indoor Championships | Prague, Czech Republic | 3rd | 4 × 400 m relay | 3:04.09 |
| 2015 | European U23 Championships | Tallinn, Estonia | 6th | 400 m | 46.60 |
| 2015 | European U23 Championships | Tallinn, Estonia | 4th | 4 × 400 m relay | 3:07.27 |
| 2016 | European Championships | Amsterdam, Netherlands | 4th | 4 × 400 m relay | 3:03.86 |
| 2017 | European Indoor Championships | Belgrade, Serbia | 12th (h) | 400 m | 47.50 |
| 2017 | European Indoor Championships | Belgrade, Serbia | 3rd | 4 × 400 m relay | 3:08.60 |
| 2017 | IAAF World Relays | Nassau, Bahamas | 4th (B) | 4 × 400 m relay | 3:08.17 |
| 2018 | World Indoor Championships | Birmingham, United Kingdom | 13th (sf) | 400 m | 47.04 |
| 2018 | World Indoor Championships | Birmingham, United Kingdom | 5th | 4 × 400 m relay | 3:04.87 |
| 2018 | European Championships | Berlin, Germany | 18th (h) | 400 m | 46.52 |
| 2018 | European Championships | Berlin, Germany | 7th | 4 × 400 m relay | 3:03.00 |
| 2019 | World Championships | Doha, Qatar | 11th (h) | 4 × 400 m relay | 3:02.97 |
| 2021 | European Indoor Championships | Toruń, Poland | 16th (sf) | 400 m | 47.69 |
| 2021 | European Indoor Championships | Toruń, Poland | 2nd | 4 × 400 m relay | 3:06.54 |
| 2021 | World Relays | Chorzów, Poland | 10th (h) | 4 × 400 m relay | 3:05.11 |
| 2021 | Olympic Games | Tokyo, Japan | 15th (h) | 4 × 400 m relay | 3:03.61 |
| 2022 | World Indoor Championships | Belgrade, Serbia | 5th | 400 m | 46.81 |
| 2022 | World Indoor Championships | Belgrade, Serbia | 5th | 4 × 400 m relay | 3:07.98 |
| 2022 | World Championships | Eugene, United States | 24th (h) | 400 m | 46.07 |
| 2022 | World Championships | Eugene, United States | 8th | 4 × 400 m relay | 3:01.63 |
| 2022 | European Championships | Munich, Germany | 9th (sf) | 400 m | 45.66 |
| 2022 | European Championships | Munich, Germany | 6th | 4 × 400 m relay | 3:01.82 |
| 2023 | World Championships | Budapest, Hungary | 12th (h) | 4 × 400 m relay | 3:00.99 |
| 2024 | World Indoor Championships | Glasgow, United Kingdom | – | 4 × 400 m relay | DNF |
| 2024 | European Championships | Rome, Italy | 19th (h) | 400 m | 46.40 |
| 2024 | European Championships | Rome, Italy | 12th (h) | 4 × 400 m relay | 3:06.70 |

== Personal bests ==
Outdoor

- 200 metres – 20.98 (Cheb 2022)
- 300 metres – 32.49 (Ústí nad Orlicí 2021)
- 400 metres – 45.41 (Zagreb 2021)

Indoor

- 200 metres – 21.15 (Prague 2018)
- 300 metres – 33.26 (Ostrava 2022)
- 400 metres – 46.25 (Prague 2022)
