= 2015 European Athletics U23 Championships – Men's 400 metres =

The men's 400 metres event at the 2015 European Athletics U23 Championships was held in Tallinn, Estonia, at Kadriorg Stadium on 9 and 11 July.

== Medalists ==
Gold	Thomas Jordier; France
Silver	Pavel Ivashko; Russia
Bronze	Luka Janežič; Slovenia

== Results ==
=== Final ===
11 July

Rank	Name	Nationality	Reaction Time	Time	Notes
1st place, gold medalist(s)	Thomas Jordier	France	0.173	45.50	PB
2nd place, silver medalist(s)	Pavel Ivashko	Russia	0.229	45.73	
3rd place, bronze medalist(s)	Luka Janežič	Slovenia	0.173	45.73	
4	Davide Re	Italy	0.162	46.37	
5	Alexander Gladitz	Germany	0.139	46.42	
6	Patrik Šorm	Czech Republic	0.178	46.60	
7	Ludvy Vaillant	France	0.163	47.04	
8	Robin Vanderbemden	Belgium	0.145	47.20	

=== Heats ===
9 July

==== Heat 1 ====
Rank	Name	Nationality	Reaction Time	Time	Notes
1	Luka Janežič	Slovenia	0.167	45.93	Q
2	Ludvy Vaillant	France	0.148	46.03	PB Q
3	Robin Vanderbemden	Belgium	0.156	46.10	PB q
4	Michal Desenský	Czech Republic	0.197	46.39	PB
5	Kajetan Duszyński	Poland	0.181	46.89	
6	Kolbeinn Hödur Gunnarsson	Iceland	0.152	47.28	PB
7	Sten Ütsmüts	Estonia	0.152	48.78	SB

==== Heat 2 ====
Rank	Name	Nationality	Reaction Time	Time	Notes
1	Thomas Jordier	France	0.175	45.59	=PB Q
2	Alexander Gladitz	Germany	0.144	46.02	Q
3	Patrik Šorm	Czech Republic	0.207	46.34	SB q
4	Andrey Chernyshov	Russia	0.182	46.69	
5	Alexandru Babian	Moldova	0.194	47.34	PB
6	Oleksiy Pozdnyakov	Ukraine	0.181	47.58	

==== Heat 3 ====
Rank	Name	Nationality	Reaction Time	Time	Notes
1	Davide Re	Italy	0.156	46.32	SB Q
2	Pavel Ivashko	Russia	0.232	46.35	Q
3	Ricardo dos Santos	Portugal	0.216	46.51	
4	Lucas Bua	Spain	0.163	46.73	
5	Alexandre Divet	France	0.174	46.76	
6	Joachim Sandberg	Norway	0.155	47.19	PB
7	Reece Dimech	Malta	0.202	49.73	

== Participation ==
According to an unofficial count, 20 athletes from 16 countries participated in the event.

- Belgium (1)
- Czech Republic (2)
- Estonia (1)
- France (3)
- Germany (1)
- Iceland (1)
- Italy (1)
- Malta (1)
- Moldova (1)
- Norway (1)
- Poland (1)
- Portugal (1)
- Russia (2)
- Slovenia (1)
- Spain (1)
- Ukraine (1)
