= 2014 European Athletics Championships – Men's 4 × 400 metres relay =

Men's 4 × 400 metres relay at the European Athletics Championships

The men's 4 × 400 metres relay at the 2014 European Athletics Championships took place at the Letzigrund on 16 and 17 August.

== Medalists ==
Gold	Conrad Williams, Matthew Hudson-Smith, Michael Bingham, Martyn Rooney, Nigel Levine, Rabah Yousif; Great Britain
Silver	Rafał Omelko, Kacper Kozłowski, Łukasz Krawczuk, Jakub Krzewina, Andrzej Jaros, Michał Pietrzak; Poland
Bronze	Mame-Ibra Anne, Teddy Venel, Mamoudou Hanne, Thomas Jordier; France

== Records ==
Standing records prior to the 2014 European Athletics Championships
World record	United States; Andrew Valmon, Quincy Watts; Butch Reynolds, Michael Johnson	2:54.29	Stuttgart, Germany	22 August 1993
European record	Great Britain; Iwan Thomas, Jamie Baulch; Mark Richardson, Roger Black	2:56.60	Atlanta, United States	3 August 1996
Championship record	Great Britain; Paul Sanders, Kriss Akabusi; John Regis, Roger Black	2:58.22	Split, Yugoslavia	1 September 1990
World Leading	United States; David Verburg, Tony McQuay; Christian Taylor, LaShawn Merritt	2:57.25	Nassau, Bahamas	25 May 2014
European Leading	Great Britain; Michael Bingham, Conrad Williams; Nigel Levine, Martyn Rooney	3:00.32	Nassau, Bahamas	25 May 2014
Broken records during the 2014 European Athletics Championships
European Leading	Great Britain; Conrad Williams, Matthew Hudson-Smith; Michael Bingham, Martyn Rooney	2:58.79	Zürich, Switzerland	17 August 2014

== Schedule ==
Date	Time	Round
16 August 2014	16:48	Round 1
17 August 2014	15:42	Final

All times are local times (UTC+2)

== Results ==
=== Round 1 ===
First 3 in each heat (Q) and 2 best performers (q) advance to the Final.

Rank	Heat	Lane	Nation	Athletes	Time	Notes
1	1	1	Great Britain	Nigel Levine, Michael Bingham, Rabah Yousif, Martyn Rooney	3:00.65	Q
2	1	5	France	Mame-Ibra Anne, Teddy Venel, Mamoudou Hanne, Thomas Jordier	3:00.80	Q, SB
3	1	3	Germany	Thomas Schneider, Miguel Rigau, David Gollnow, Jonas Plass	3:02.41	Q, SB
DQ	2	4	Russia	Nikita Uglov, Pavel Ivashko, Pavel Trenikhin, Vladimir Krasnov	3:03.19	Q
5	2	5	Poland	Michał Pietrzak, Kacper Kozłowski, Andrzej Jaros, Rafał Omelko	3:03.52	Q, SB
6	2	2	Ireland	Brian Gregan, Brian Murphy, Richard Morrissey, Thomas Barr	3:03.57	Q, NR
7	2	7	Belgium	Julien Watrin, Antoine Gillet, Michaël Bultheel, Kevin Borlée	3:03.83	q
8	1	4	Czech Republic	Jan Tesař, Daniel Němeček, Michal Desenský, Patrik Šorm	3:04.07	q, SB
9	2	8	Spain	Pau Fradera, Samuel García, Lucas Búa, Mark Ujakpor	3:04.68	SB
10	1	2	Italy	Davide Re, Michele Tricca, Lorenzo Valentini, Matteo Galvan	3:04.74	SB
11	1	7	Netherlands	Bjorn Blauwhof, Terrence Agard, Obed Martis, Liemarvin Bonevacia	3:05.93	
12	2	3	Turkey	Batuhan Altıntaş, Halit Kiliç, İlham Tanui Özbilen, Yavuz Can	3:07.68	
13	1	8	Denmark	Festus Asante, Andreas Bube, Nick Ekelund-Arenander, Nicklas Hyde	3:08.12	
14	2	6	Switzerland	Silvan Lutz, Daniele Angelella, Philipp Weissenberger, Johannes Wagner	3:08.63	SB
15	2	1	Croatia	Staša Vrhovec, Mateo Kovačić, Yann Eloi Senjarić, Mateo Ružić	3:12.73	
	1	6	Ukraine	Vitaliy Butrym, Yevhen Hutsol, Danylo Danylenko, Volodymyr Burakov	DSQ	R 163.2

=== Final ===
Rank	Lane	Nation	Athletes	Time	Notes
1st place, gold medalist(s)	5	Great Britain	Conrad Williams, Matthew Hudson-Smith, Michael Bingham, Martyn Rooney	2:58.79	EL
~~DQ~~	3	Russia	Maksim Dyldin, Pavel Ivashko, Nikita Uglov, Vladimir Krasnov	DQ (2:59.38)	~~NR~~
2nd place, silver medalist(s)	4	Poland	Rafał Omelko, Kacper Kozłowski, Łukasz Krawczuk, Jakub Krzewina	2:59.85	SB
3rd place, bronze medalist(s)	6	France	Mame-Ibra Anne, Teddy Venel, Mamoudou Hanne, Thomas Jordier	2:59.89	SB
4	8	Ireland	Brian Gregan, Mark English, Richard Morrissey, Thomas Barr	3:01.67	NR
5	7	Germany	Kamghe Gaba, Miguel Rigau, Jonas Plass, Thomas Schneider	3:01.70	SB
6	2	Belgium	Julien Watrin, Kevin Borlée, Michaël Bultheel, Stef Vanhaeren	3:02.60	SB
7	1	Czech Republic	Jan Tesař, Daniel Němeček, Michal Desenský, Patrik Šorm	3:04.56	
