= Conrad Williams =

Conrad Williams may refer to:

- Conrad Williams (Family Affairs), a fictional character in UK soap opera Family Affairs
- Conrad Williams (athlete) (born 1982), British 400m athlete
