= 2015 European Athletics U23 Championships – Men's 4 × 400 metres relay =

The men's 4x400 metres relay event at the 2015 European Athletics U23 Championships was held in Tallinn, Estonia, at Kadriorg Stadium on 12 July.

== Medalists ==
Gold	Ludvy Vaillant; Alexandre Divet; Nicolas Courbière; Thomas Jordier; France
Silver	Kajetan Duszyński; Patryk Dobek; Bartłomiej Chojnowski; Karol Zalewski; Poland
Bronze	Jakob Krempin; Alexander Gladitz; Torben Junker; Marc Koch; Germany

== Results ==
=== Final ===
12 July

Rank	Name	Nationality	Reaction Time	Time	Notes
1st place, gold medalist(s)	France	Ludvy Vaillant; Alexandre Divet; Nicolas Courbière; Thomas Jordier	0.159	3:04.92	NUR
2nd place, silver medalist(s)	Poland	Kajetan Duszyński; Patryk Dobek; Bartłomiej Chojnowski; Karol Zalewski	0.190	3:05.35	
3rd place, bronze medalist(s)	Germany	Jakob Krempin; Alexander Gladitz; Torben Junker; Marc Koch	0.202	3:05.97	
4	Czech Republic	Albert Holibka; Michal Desenský; Michal Tlustý; Patrik Šorm	0.184	3:07.27	
5	Ukraine	Oleksiy Matskevych; Oleksiy Pozdnyakov; Maksym Lyabin; Danylo Danylenko	0.180	3:09.14	
6	Norway	Joachim Sandberg; Simen Sigurdsen; Håkon Solli Henriksen; Torbjørn Fossum Heldal	0.136	3:09.66	NUR
	Russia	Artyom Denmukhametov; Nikita Polyakov; Andrey Chernyshov; Pavel Ivashko	0.160	DQ	

== Participation ==
According to an unofficial count, 28 athletes from 7 countries participated in the event.

- Czech Republic (4)
- France (4)
- Germany (4)
- Norway (4)
- Poland (4)
- Russia (4)
- Ukraine (4)
