= Stanislav Senyk =

Ukrainian male athlete

Personal information
- Born: 23 November 1996 (age 29) Ivano-Frankivsk, Ukraine
- Height: 1.84 m (6 ft 0 in)
- Weight: 80 kg (176 lb)

Sport
- Sport: Athletics
- Event(s): 400 metres, 800 metres
- Club: Dynamo
- Coached by: Yuriy Dzundza
Medal record
European Games
Gold medal – first place	2019 Minsk	Team event
Gold medal – first place	2019 Minsk	Mixed 4 x 400 metres relay

Stanislav Senyk (Ukrainian: Станіслав Антонович Сеник; born 23 November 1996 in Ivano-Frankivsk, Ukraine) is a male Ukrainian athlete specialising in the 400 metres and 800 metres. He won two gold medals at the 2019 European Games.

== International competitions ==
Year	Competition	Venue	Position	Event	Notes
Representing Ukraine
2018	European Championships	Berlin, Germany	25th (h)	400 m hurdles	47.10
2018	European Championships	Berlin, Germany	10th (h)	4 × 400 m relay	3:03.93

== Personal bests ==
Outdoor

- 400 metres – 46.68 (Kropyvnytskiy 2018)
- 800 metres – 1:48.06 (Kropyvnytskiy 2018)

Indoor

- 300 metres – 35.59 (Lviv 2017)
- 400 metres – 48.35 (Kyiv 2019)
- 600 metres – 1:21.01 (Lviv 2017)
- 800 metres – 1:51.15 (Kyiv 2016)
