= 2017 European Athletics Indoor Championships – Men's 400 metres =

The men's 400 metres event at the 2017 European Athletics Indoor Championships was held on 3 March 2017 at 10:20 (heats), at 18:05 (semifinals) and on 4 March 20:33 (final) local time.

== Medalists ==
Gold	Silver	Bronze
Pavel Maslák; Czech Republic	Rafał Omelko; Poland	Liemarvin Bonevacia; Netherlands

== Records ==
Standing records prior to the 2017 European Athletics Indoor Championships
World record	Kerron Clement (USA)	44.57	Fayetteville, AR, United States	12 March 2005
European record	Thomas Schönlebe (GDR)	45.05	Sindelfingen, West Germany	5 February 1988
Championship record	Pavel Maslák (CZE)	45.33	Prague, Czech Republic	7 March 2015
World Leading	Fred Kerley (USA)	45.02	Clemson, United States	10 February 2017
European Leading	Pavel Maslák (CZE)	45.80	Toruń, Poland	10 February 2017

== Results ==
=== Heats ===
Qualification: First 2 in each heat (Q) and the next 2 fastest (q) advance to the Semifinal.

Rank	Heat	Athlete	Nationality	Time	Note
1	5	Benjamin Lobo Vedel	Denmark	46.65	Q, PB
2	3	Lucas Búa	Spain	46.72	Q
3	1	Liemarvin Bonevacia	Netherlands	46.91	Q
4	3	Rafał Omelko	Poland	46.97	Q
4	5	Thomas Jordier	France	46.97	Q, SB
6	1	Óscar Husillos	Spain	47.13	Q
7	4	Samuel García	Spain	47.16	Q
8	3	Yoann Décimus	France	47.25	q
9	3	Jan Tesař	Czech Republic	47.28	q
10	1	Marc Koch	Germany	47.39	
11	4	Batuhan Altıntaş	Turkey	47.44	Q
12	1	Patrik Šorm	Czech Republic	47.50	
13	2	Pavel Maslák	Czech Republic	47.57	Q
14	2	Brian Gregan	Ireland	47.62	Q
15	4	Marvin Schlegel	Germany	47.65	
16	2	Mateo Ružić	Croatia	47.66	
17	3	Vitaliy Butrym	Ukraine	47.76	
18	4	Yevhen Hutsol	Ukraine	47.77	
19	1	Denis Danáč	Slovakia	48.02	
20	2	Marco Lorenzi	Italy	48.10	
21	1	Luca Flück	Switzerland	48.29	
22	2	Tony van Diepen	Netherlands	48.57	
23	3	Rusmir Malkočević	Bosnia and Herzegovina	48.58	
24	5	Miloš Raović	Serbia	48.89	
	4	Terrence Agard	Netherlands	DNF	
	2	Mauritz Kåshagen	Norway	DQ	R162.7
	5	Luka Janežič	Slovenia	DQ	R163.3b
	5	Mario Lambrughi	Italy	DQ	R163.3b

=== Semifinals ===
Qualification: First 3 in each heat (Q) advance to the Final.

Rank	Heat	Athlete	Nationality	Time	Note
1	1	Pavel Maslák	Czech Republic	46.45	Q
2	1	Benjamin Lobo Vedel	Denmark	46.60	Q, PB
3	1	Samuel García	Spain	46.62	Q
4	2	Rafał Omelko	Poland	47.15	Q
5	2	Liemarvin Bonevacia	Netherlands	47.21	Q
6	2	Lucas Búa	Spain	47.24	Q
7	1	Thomas Jordier	France	47.49	
8	2	Jan Tesař	Czech Republic	47.64	
9	2	Óscar Husillos	Spain	47.83	
10	2	Yoann Décimus	France	47.87	
11	1	Batuhan Altıntaş	Turkey	47.89	
12	1	Brian Gregan	Ireland	48.08	

=== Final ===
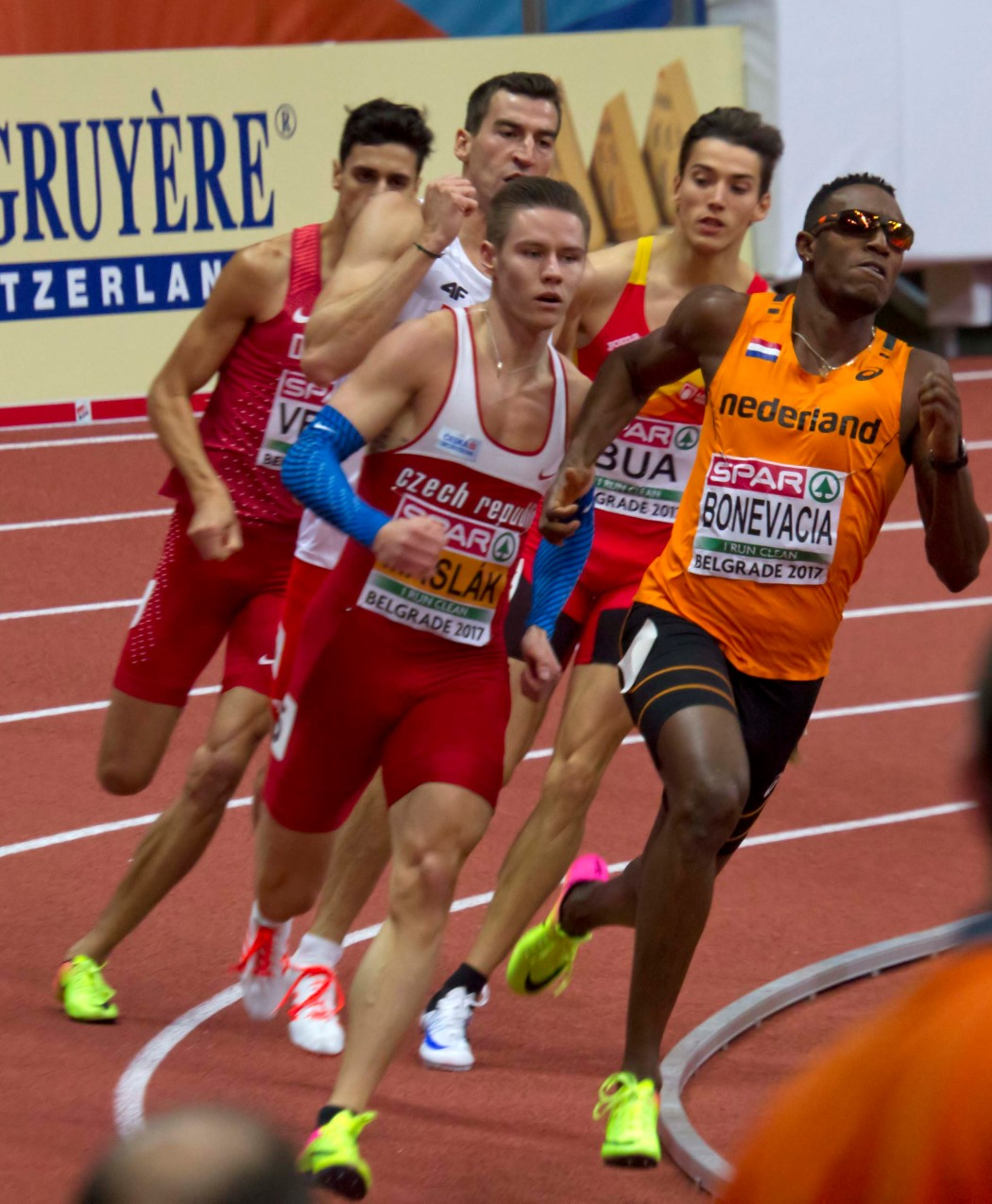
The final

Rank	Lane	Athlete	Nationality	Time	Note
1st place, gold medalist(s)	5	Pavel Maslák	Czech Republic	45.77	EL
2nd place, silver medalist(s)	6	Rafał Omelko	Poland	46.08	PB
3rd place, bronze medalist(s)	3	Liemarvin Bonevacia	Netherlands	46.26	NR
4	4	Benjamin Lobo Vedel	Denmark	46.33	PB
5	2	Lucas Búa	Spain	46.74	
6	1	Samuel García	Spain	46.74	
