= Vitaliy Butrym =

Ukrainian sprinter

Personal information
- Born: 10 January 1991 (age 35) Boromlia, Ukrainian SSR, Soviet Union
- Height: 1.78 m (5 ft 10 in)
- Weight: 67 kg (148 lb)

Sport
- Country: Ukraine
- Sport: Athletics
- Event: 400m

Vitaliy Butrym (Ukrainian: Віталій Бутрим; born 10 January 1991) is a Ukrainian sprinter specialising in the 400 metres.

== Career ==
He represented his country at the 2012 Summer Olympics without advancing from the first round. He also competed in one indoor and two outdoor World Championships.

His personal bests in the event are 45.01 seconds outdoors (Almaty 2015) and 46.45 seconds indoors (Istanbul 2018). Both are the current national records.

== International competitions ==
Year	Competition	Venue	Position	Event	Notes
Representing Ukraine
2011	European U23 Championships	Ostrava, Czech Republic	8th	400 m	46.96
2011	European U23 Championships	Ostrava, Czech Republic	–	4 × 400 m relay	DNF
2012	Olympic Games	London, United Kingdom	42nd (h)	400 m	47.62
2013	European Indoor Championships	Gothenburg, Sweden	6th (sf)	400 m	47.01
2013	European U23 Championships	Tampere, Finland	2nd	400 m	45.88
2013	European U23 Championships	Tampere, Finland	8th	4 × 400 m relay	3:20.10
2013	World Championships	Moscow, Russia	21st (h)	4 × 400 m relay	3:04.98
2014	World Indoor Championships	Sopot, Poland	17th (h)	400 m	46.98
2014	World Indoor Championships	Sopot, Poland	6th	4 × 400 m relay	3:08.79
2014	European Championships	Zürich, Switzerland	24th (sf)	400 m	48.16
2014	European Championships	Zürich, Switzerland	–	4 × 400 m relay	DQ
2015	European Indoor Championships	Prague, Czech Republic	15th (sf)	400 m	48.09
2015	World Championships	Beijing, China	39th (h)	400 m	45.88
2016	European Championships	Amsterdam, Netherlands	16th (sf)	400 m	46.07
2016	European Championships	Amsterdam, Netherlands	6th	4 × 400 m relay	3:04.45
2016	Olympic Games	Rio de Janeiro, Brazil	30th (h)	400 m	45.92
2017	European Indoor Championships	Belgrade, Serbia	17th (h)	400 m	47.76
2017	European Indoor Championships	Belgrade, Serbia	5th	4 × 400 m relay	3:09.64
2018	World Indoor Championships	Birmingham, United Kingdom	19th (h)	400 m	47.45
2018	European Championships	Berlin, Germany	22nd (sf)	400 m	46.01
2018	European Championships	Berlin, Germany	10th (h)	4 × 400 m relay	3:03.93
2019	European Indoor Championships	Glasgow, United Kingdom	7th (sf)	400 m	47.20
