= Rafał Omelko =

Polish sprinter (born 1989)

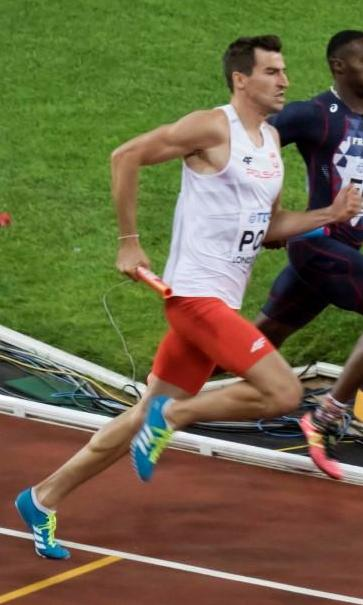

Personal information
- Full name: Rafał Konrad Omelko
- Nationality: Polish
- Born: 18 January 1989 (age 37) Wrocław, Poland
- Education: Academy of Physical Education
- Height: 1.95 m (6 ft 5 in)
- Weight: 82 kg (181 lb)

Sport
- Sport: Running
- Event: Sprints
- Club: AZS AWF Wrocław
- Coached by: Marek Rożej
Medal record
Men's athletics
Representing Poland
World Indoor Championships
Gold medal – first place	2018 Birmingham	4 × 400 m
European Championships
Silver medal – second place	2016 Amsterdam	4 × 400 m
Bronze medal – third place	2014 Zürich	4 × 400 m
European Indoor Championships
Gold medal – first place	2017 Belgrade	4 × 400 m
Silver medal – second place	2015 Prague	4 × 400 m
Silver medal – second place	2017 Belgrade	400 m
Bronze medal – third place	2015 Prague	400 m
European Team Championships
Bronze medal – third place	2019 Bydgoszcz	4 × 400 m
Universiade
Bronze medal – third place	2015 Gwangju	4 × 400 m
Bronze medal – third place	2017 Taipei	400 m

Rafał Omelko (Polish pronunciation: [ˈrafaw ɔˈmɛlkɔ]; born 16 January 1989) is a retired Polish athlete who specialised in the 400 metres. He won two medals in the 4 × 400 metres relay at the European Athletics Championships.

== Career ==
Omelko finished fourth at the 2013 Summer Universiade and reached the semifinals at the 2014 World Indoor Championships.

His personal bests in the event are 45.14 seconds outdoors (2016) and 46.08 indoors (2017).

Omelko and his teammates qualified to the 4 × 400 metres relay final at the 2016 Summer Olympics in Rio de Janeiro, Brazil.

The Polish quartet of Karol Zalewski, Rafał Omelko, Łukasz Krawczuk, Jakub Krzewina broke the world indoor record in the men's 4 × 400 m with a stunning finish to the final track event of the 2018 World Indoor Championships in Birmingham. Krzewina overtook the leaders from the beginning - Americans on the last straight and achieved the greatest success in their career.

== Competition record ==
Year	Competition	Venue	Position	Event	Notes
Representing Poland
2008	World Junior Championships	Bydgoszcz, Poland	5th	4 × 400 m relay	3:08.65
2010	European Championships	Barcelona, Spain	24th (h)	400 m hurdles	52.54
2011	European U23 Championships	Ostrava, Czech Republic	2nd^{†}	4 × 400 m relay	3:05.96 (h)^{†}
2013	European Indoor Championships	Gothenburg, Sweden	–	4 × 400 m relay	DQ
2013	Universiade	Kazan, Russia	4th	400 m	45.69
2013	World Championships	Moscow, Russia	7th (h)	4 × 400 m relay	3:01.73
2014	World Indoor Championships	Sopot, Poland	9th (sf)	400 m	46.94
2014	World Indoor Championships	Sopot, Poland	4th	4 × 400 m relay	3:04.39
2014	IAAF World Relays	Nassau, Bahamas	19th (h)	4 × 400 m relay	3:05.16
2014	European Championships	Zürich, Switzerland	21st (sf)	400 m	46.69
2014	European Championships	Zürich, Switzerland	3rd	4 × 400 m relay	2:59.85
2015	European Indoor Championships	Prague, Czech Republic	3rd	400 m	46.26
2015	European Indoor Championships	Prague, Czech Republic	2nd	4 × 400 m relay	3:02.97
2015	IAAF World Relays	Nassau, Bahamas	9th	4 × 400 m relay	3:03.23
2015	Universiade	Gwangju, South Korea	13th (sf)	400 m	46.62
2015	Universiade	Gwangju, South Korea	3rd	4 × 400 m relay	3:07.77
2015	World Championships	Beijing, China	11th (h)	4 × 400 m relay	3:00.72
2016	European Championships	Amsterdam, Netherlands	6th	400 m	45.67
2016	European Championships	Amsterdam, Netherlands	2nd	4 × 400 m relay	3:01.18
2016	Olympic Games	Rio de Janeiro, Brazil	19th (sf)	400 m	45.28
2016	Olympic Games	Rio de Janeiro, Brazil	7th	4 × 400 m relay	3:00.50
2017	European Indoor Championships	Belgrade, Serbia	2nd	400 m	46.08 PB
2017	European Indoor Championships	Belgrade, Serbia	1st	4 × 400 m relay	3:06.99
2017	IAAF World Relays	Nassau, Bahamas	9th (h)	4 × 200 m relay	1:24.78
2017	IAAF World Relays	Nassau, Bahamas	3rd (B)	4 × 400 m relay	3:07.89
2017	World Championships	London, United Kingdom	18th (sf)	400 m	45.37
2017	World Championships	London, United Kingdom	7th	4 × 400 m relay	3:01.59
2017	Universiade	Taipei, Taiwan	3rd	400 m	45.56
2017	Universiade	Taipei, Taiwan	–	4 × 400 m relay	DNF
2018	World Indoor Championships	Birmingham, United Kingdom	8th (sf)	400 m	46.39
2018	World Indoor Championships	Birmingham, United Kingdom	1st	4 × 400 m relay	3:01.77 WIR
2018	European Championships	Berlin, Germany	5th	4 × 400 m relay	3:02.27
2019	European Indoor Championships	Glasgow, United Kingdom	4th	4 × 400 m relay	3:08.40

^{†}: Competed only in heat.
