= Samuel García (sprinter) =

Spanish sprinter (born 1991)

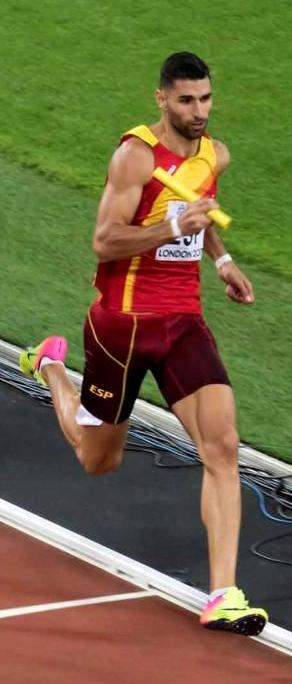
- García in 2017

Personal information
- Full name: Samuel García Cabrera
- Nationality: Spanish
- Born: 4 December 1991 (age 33) Santa Cruz de La Palma, Spain
- Height: 196 cm (6 ft 5 in)
- Weight: 90 kg (198 lb)

Sport
- Sport: Athletics
- Event: 400 metres
- Club: Santa Cruz de La Palma
- Coached by: Álex Codina

Samuel García Cabrera (born 4 December 1991) is a Spanish track and field athlete specialising in the 400 metres. He represented his country in the 4 × 400 metres relay at the 2013 World Championships and won a bronze medal at the 2018 European Championships. Individually, his best outing so far is the seventh place at the 2014 European Championships.

His personal bests in the 400 metres are 45.00 seconds outdoors (Monachil 7 July 2017) and 46.35 seconds indoors (Salamanca 2017).

== International competitions ==
Year	Competition	Venue	Position	Event	Notes
Representing Spain
2009	European Junior Championships	Novi Sad, Serbia	9th (h)	4 × 400 m relay	3:23.93
2010	World Junior Championships	Moncton, Canada	12th (h)	4 × 400 m relay	3:11.59
2011	European U23 Championships	Ostrava, Czech Republic	6th	4 × 400 m relay	3:07.58
2012	World Indoor Championships	Istanbul, Turkey	5th	4 × 400 m relay	3:10.01
2012	European Championships	Helsinki, Finland	–	400 m	DQ
2012	European Championships	Helsinki, Finland	10th (h)	4 × 400 m relay	3:09.11
2013	European Indoor Championships	Zürich, Switzerland	14th (h)	400 m	47.76
2013	European U23 Championships	Tampere, Finland	10th (h)	400 m	46.98
2013	European U23 Championships	Tampere, Finland	5th	4 × 400 m relay	3:05.28
2013	World Championships	Moscow, Russia	16th (h)	4 × 400 m relay	3:04.07
2014	World Indoor Championships	Sopot, Poland	9th (h)	4 × 400 m relay	3:10.17
2014	European Championships	Zürich, Switzerland	7th	400 m	46.35
2014	European Championships	Zürich, Switzerland	9th (h)	4 × 400 m relay	3:04.68
2015	European Indoor Championships	Prague, Czech Republic	14th (sf)	400 m	47.95
2015	IAAF World Relays	Nassau, Bahamas	22nd (h)	4 × 400 m relay	3:08.49
2016	European Championships	Amsterdam, Netherlands	20th (sf)	400 m	46.43
2016	European Championships	Amsterdam, Netherlands	10th (h)	4 × 400 m relay	3:04.77
2017	European Indoor Championships	Belgrade, Serbia	6th	400 m	46.74
2017	World Championships	London, United Kingdom	39th (h)	400 m	46.37
2017	World Championships	London, United Kingdom	5th	4 × 400 m relay	3:00.65
2018	World Indoor Championships	Birmingham, United Kingdom	7th (h)	4 × 400 m relay	3:07.52
2018	European Championships	Berlin, Germany	21st (sf)	400 m	45.87
2018	European Championships	Berlin, Germany	3rd	4 × 400 m relay	3:00.78
2019	World Championships	Doha, Qatar	14th (h)	4 × 400 m relay	3:04.27
2021	European Indoor Championships	Toruń, Poland	16th (h)	400 m	47.02
2021	World Relays	Chorzów, Poland	13th (h)	4 × 400 m relay	3:06.09
2021	World Relays	Chorzów, Poland	6th	Mixed 4 × 400 m relay	3:19.65
2021	Olympic Games	Tokyo, Japan	9th (h)	Mixed 4 × 400 m relay	3:09.14
2022	Ibero-American Championships	La Nucía, Spain	8th	400 m	46.92
2022	Ibero-American Championships	La Nucía, Spain	2nd	4 × 400 m relay	3:04.05
2022	European Championships	Munich, Germany	4th	4 × 400 m relay	3:00.54
2023	World Championships	Budapest, Hungary	15th (h)	4 × 400 m relay	3:02.64
