= Łukasz Krawczuk =

Polish sprinter (born 1989)

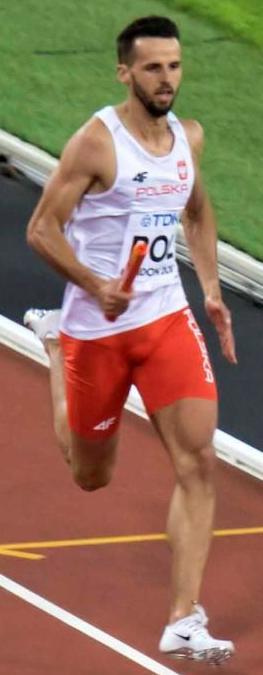

Personal information
- Nationality: Polish
- Born: 15 June 1989 (age 37) Kłodzko, Poland
- Height: 1.84 m (6 ft 0 in)
- Weight: 75 kg (165 lb)

Sport
- Sport: Running
- Event: Sprints
- Club: WKS Śląsk Wrocław
- Coached by: Maciej Wojsa
Medal record
Men's athletics
Representing Poland
World Indoor Championships
Gold medal – first place	2018 Birmingham	4 × 400 m
European Championships
Silver medal – second place	2016 Amsterdam	4 × 400 m
Bronze medal – third place	2014 Zürich	4 × 400 m
European Indoor Championships
Gold medal – first place	2017 Belgrade	4 × 400 m
Silver medal – second place	2015 Prague	4 × 400 m
European Team Championships
Bronze medal – third place	2019 Bydgoszcz	4 × 400 m
European U23 Championships
Gold medal – first place	2009 Kaunas	4 × 400 m
Silver medal – second place	2011 Ostrava	4 × 400 m

Łukasz Krawczuk (Polish pronunciation: [ˈwukaʂ ˈkraft͡ʂuk]; born 15 June 1989) is a Polish sprinter specialising in the 400 metres. He has won two medals in the 4 × 400 metres relay at the European Athletics Championships.

== Career ==
Krawczuk represented his country in the 4 × 400 metres relay at the 2013 World Championships, as well as two indoor World Championships in 2012 and 2014. He won the bronze medal with the Polish relay team at the 2014 European Championships and silver at the 2015 European Indoor Championships.

His personal bests in the event are 45.65 seconds outdoors (Szczecin 2014) and 46.31 seconds indoors (Prague 2015).

Krawczuk and his teammates qualified to the 4 × 400 metres relay final at the 2016 Summer Olympics in Rio de Janeiro, Brazil.

The Polish quartet of Karol Zalewski, Rafał Omelko, Łukasz Krawczuk, Jakub Krzewina broke the world indoor record in the men's 4 × 400 m with a stunning finish to the final track event of the 2018 World Indoor Championships in Birmingham. Krzewina overtook the leaders from the beginning - Americans on the last straight and achieved the greatest success in their career.

== Competition record ==
Year	Competition	Venue	Position	Event	Notes
Representing Poland
2009	European U23 Championships	Kaunas, Lithuania	1st (h)	4 × 400 m relay	3:07.13
2011	European Indoor Championships	Paris, France	5th	4 × 400 m relay	3:09.31
2011	European U23 Championships	Ostrava, Czech Republic	13th (h)	400 m	47.26
2011	European U23 Championships	Ostrava, Czech Republic	2nd	4 × 400 m relay	3:03.62
2012	World Indoor Championships	Istanbul, Turkey	6th	4 × 400 m relay	3:11.86
2013	World Championships	Moscow, Russia	7th (h)	4 × 400 m relay	3:01.73
2014	World Indoor Championships	Sopot, Poland	4th (h)	4 × 400 m relay	3:06.50
2014	IAAF World Relays	Nassau, Bahamas	19th (h)	4 × 400 m relay	3:05.16
2014	European Championships	Zürich, Switzerland	16th (sf)	400 m	46.24
2014	European Championships	Zürich, Switzerland	3rd	4 × 400 m relay	2:59.85
2015	European Indoor Championships	Prague, Czech Republic	4th	400 m	46.31
2015	European Indoor Championships	Prague, Czech Republic	2nd	4 × 400 m relay	3:02.97
2015	IAAF World Relays	Nassau, Bahamas	11th (h)	4 × 400 m relay	3:05.13
2015	IAAF World Relays	Nassau, Bahamas	4th	Distance medley relay	9:24.07
2015	World Championships	Beijing, China	11th (h)	4 × 400 m relay	3:00.72
2016	European Championships	Amsterdam, Netherlands	12th (sf)	400 m	45.86
2016	European Championships	Amsterdam, Netherlands	2nd	4 × 400 m relay	3:01.18
2016	Olympic Games	Rio de Janeiro, Brazil	7th	4 × 400 m relay	3:00.50
2017	European Indoor Championships	Belgrade, Serbia	1st	4 × 400 m relay	3:06.99
2017	IAAF World Relays	Nassau, Bahamas	3rd (B)	4 × 400 m relay	3:07.89
2017	World Championships	London, United Kingdom	7th	4 × 400 m relay	3:01.59
2018	World Indoor Championships	Birmingham, United Kingdom	1st	4 × 400 m relay	3:01.77 WIR
2018	European Championships	Berlin, Germany	20th (sf)	400 m	45.78
2018	European Championships	Berlin, Germany	5th	4 × 400 m relay	3:02.27
