= Batuhan Altıntaş (sprinter) =

Turkish sprinter (born 1996)

Personal information
- Born: 28 April 1996
- Height: 1.76 m (5 ft 9 in)
- Weight: 68 kg (150 lb)

Sport
- Sport: Athletics
- Event: 400 metres
- Club: Galatasaray
Medal record
Men's athletics
Representing Turkey
Mediterranean Games
| Silver medal – second place | 2026 Taranto | 4×100 m relay |

Batuhan Altıntaş (born 28 April 1996) is a Turkish sprinter specialising in the 400 metres. Individually, he won the bronze medal at the 2015 European Junior Championships. In addition, he won two relay medals at the Islamic Solidarity Games.

== International competitions ==
| Year | Competition | Venue | Position | Event | Notes |
Representing Turkey
| 2013 | World Youth Championships | Donetsk, Ukraine | 5th | 400 m | 47.10 |
| 2013 | European Junior Championships | Rieti, Italy | 15th (h) | 400 m | 47.82 |
| 2013 | European Junior Championships | Rieti, Italy | 12th (h) | 4 × 400 m relay | 3:13.93 |
| 2013 | Islamic Solidarity Games | Palembang, Indonesia | 14th (h) | 400 m | 49.32 |
| 2013 | Islamic Solidarity Games | Palembang, Indonesia | 2nd | 4 × 400 m relay | 3:06.43 |
| 2014 | World Junior Championships | Eugene, United States | 15th (sf) | 400 m | 47.46 |
| 2014 | World Junior Championships | Eugene, United States | 10th (h) | 4 × 400 m relay | 3:10.07 |
| 2014 | European Championships | Zurich, Switzerland | 37th (h) | 400 m | 47.35 |
| 2014 | European Championships | Zurich, Switzerland | 12th (h) | 4 × 400 m relay | 3:07.68 |
| 2015 | European Junior Championships | Eskilstuna, Sweden | – | 200 m | DNF |
| 2015 | European Junior Championships | Eskilstuna, Sweden | 3rd | 400 m | 46.95 |
| 2016 | World Indoor Championships | Portland, United States | 17th (h) | 400 m | 47.21 |
| 2016 | European Championships | Amsterdam, Netherlands | 15th (sf) | 400 m | 47.23 |
| 2016 | European Championships | Amsterdam, Netherlands | 9th (h) | 4 × 400 m relay | 3:04.65 |
| 2017 | European Indoor Championships | Belgrade, Serbia | 11th (sf) | 400 m | 47.89 |
| 2017 | European Indoor Championships | Belgrade, Serbia | 6th | 4 × 400 m relay | 3:15.97 |
| 2017 | Islamic Solidarity Games | Baku, Azerbaijan | 5th | 400 m | 46.82 |
| 2017 | Islamic Solidarity Games | Baku, Azerbaijan | 1st | 4 × 400 m relay | 3:06.83 |
| 2017 | European Team Championships | Lille, France | 2nd | 400 m | 46.37 PB |
| 2017 | European U23 Championships | Bydgoszcz, Poland | 9th (sf) | 400 m | 46.49 |
| 2017 | European U23 Championships | Bydgoszcz, Poland | 9th (h) | 4 × 400 m relay | 3:10.14 |
| 2017 | World Championships | London, United Kingdom | 16th (h) | 4 × 400 m relay | 3:15.45 |
| 2017 | Universiade | Taipei, Taiwan | 12th (sf) | 400 m | 46.86 |
| 2018 | Mediterranean Games | Tarragona, Spain | 4th | 4 × 400 m relay | 3:05.28 |
| 2018 | European Championships | Berlin, Germany | 24th (h) | 400 m | 46.91 |
| 2018 | European Championships | Berlin, Germany | 13th (h) | 4 × 400 m relay | 3:07.83 |
| 2019 | Universiade | Naples, Italy | 16th (sf) | 400 m | 47.18 |
| 2022 | Islamic Solidarity Games | Konya, Turkey | 14th (sf) | 200 m | 21.26 (w) |
| 2022 | Islamic Solidarity Games | Konya, Turkey | – | 4 × 400 m relay | DQ |
| 2022 | European Championships | Munich, Germany | 14th (h) | 4 × 400 m relay | 3:06.68 |
| 2023 | World University Games | Chengdu, China | 16th (sf) | 200 m | 20.99 |
| 2023 | World University Games | Chengdu, China | 7th | 4 × 100 m relay | 39.69 |
| 2025 | Islamic Solidarity Games | Riyadh, Saudi Arabia | 8th (h) | 200 m | 21.24^{1} |
| 2025 | Islamic Solidarity Games | Riyadh, Saudi Arabia | 4th | 4 × 100 m relay | 39.85 |
| 2026 | European Championships | Birmingham, United Kingdom | 10th (h) | 4 × 100 m relay | 39.27 |
| 2026 | Mediterranean Games | Taranto, Italy | 2nd | 4 × 100 m relay | 39.09 |

^{1}Did not start in the final

== Personal bests ==
Outdoor

- 200 metres – 21.05 (+0.7 m/s, Tunis 2016)
- 300 metres – 32.76 (Ankara 2016)
- 400 metres – 46.37 (Lille 2017)

Indoor

- 200 metres – 21.33 (Istanbul 2016)
- 400 metres – 46.55 (Vienna 2016)
