= Benjamin Lobo Vedel =

Danish sprinter (born 1997)

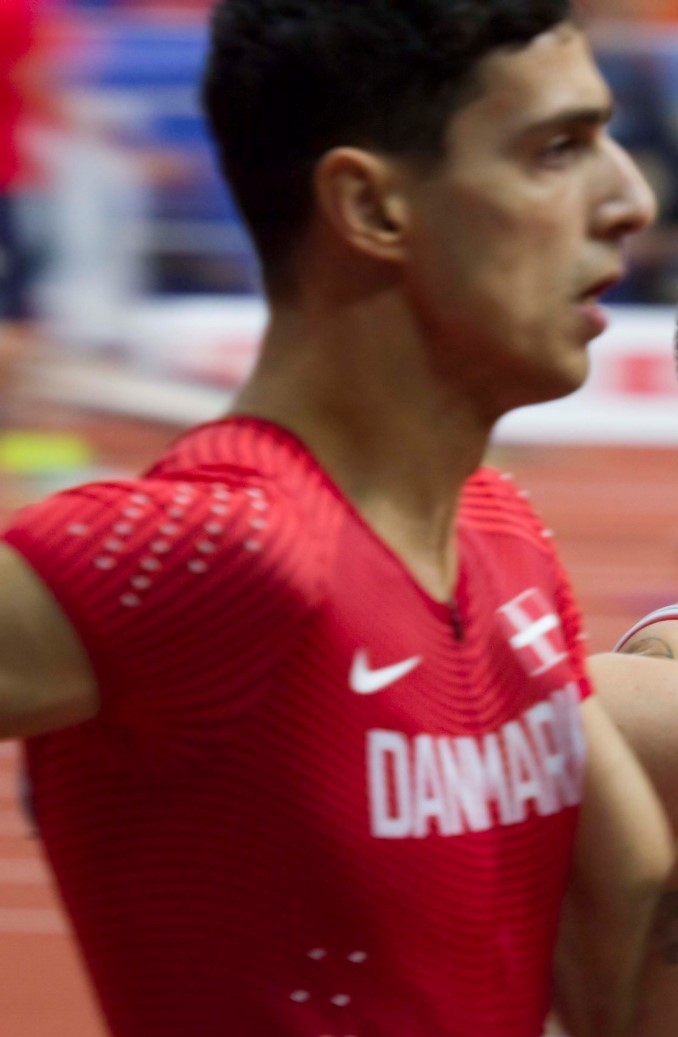
- Benjamin Lobo Vedel in 2017.

Personal information
- Nationality: (Denmark) Danish
- Born: 23 September 1997 (age 28)
- Height: 1.95 m (6 ft 5 in)
- Weight: 74 kg (163 lb)

Sport
- Country: Denmark
- Sport: Athletics
- Event(s): 400 metres, 200 metres
- College team: Florida Gators
- Club: Aalborg AM
- Turned pro: 2019
- Coached by: Mikkel Larsen

Achievements and titles
- National finals: 400m: 1st (Aarhus 2017)
- Personal bests: 400m: 45.85 (Bydgoszcz 2017); 200m: 20.97i NR (Arkansas 2018)
Medal record
Representing Denmark
Men's athletics
European Youth Olympic Festival
Bronze medal – third place	2013 Youth Olympic Festival	400 m
European Athletics Junior Championships
Gold medal – first place	2015 European Junior Championships	400 m
European Athletics U23 Championships
Bronze medal – third place	2017 European Athletics U23 Championships	400 m

Benjamin Lobo Vedel (born 23 September 1997) is a professional track and field sprinter specialising in the 400 metres and competes for Denmark. He currently trains in Aarhus, Denmark. He is the national record holder on both the 200m and 400m indoor.

== Career ==
Born in Aalborg, Denmark, Lobo Vedel won his first international medal at the European Youth Summer Olympic Festival in 2013 in a time of 48.37 on the 400m distance while also breaking his first national record. He went on to win the gold medal at the 2015 European Junior Championships and later took the bronze medal at the 2017 European U23 Championships respectively. In 2017 Lobo Vedel managed to place 4th at the European Indoor Championships in Belgrade Serbia as well, marking his debut as a senior.

Lobo Vedel turned to the United States in 2017 to continue his studies as well as his athletic career, as he committed to the Florida Gators. In his freshman year he managed to become a 2x All American, as well as winning a national NCAA team title indoors. He also anchored the third-fastest (3:01.43) 4x400 relay times in indoor track and field history. During his sophomore year, Lobo Vedel grabbed 3 more All American titles on the individual men's 400m and men's 4x400m, as well as another national team title. By the end of sophomore year, Lobo Vedel decided to return to Denmark to run professionally. As a result, he now competes for his hometown track club and Adidas.

== Personal life ==
Lobo Vedel is of Indian descent through his mother. His father, Anders Vedel, is a Danish former middle-distance runner.

== International competitions ==
Year	Competition	Venue	Position	Event	Notes
Representing Denmark
2013	European Youth Summer Olympic Festival	Utrecht, Netherlands	2nd	400 m	48.37
2014	European Youth Olympic Trials	Baku, Azerbaijan	1st	400 m	47.44
2014	World Junior Championships	Eugene, United States	35th (h)	400 m	48.13
2014	Summer Youth Olympics	Nanjing, China	5th	400 m	47.29
2015	European Indoor Championships	Prague, Czech Republic	27th (h)	400 m	48.44
2015	European Junior Championships	Eskilstuna, Sweden	1st	400 m	46.48
2017	European Indoor Championships	Belgrade, Serbia	4th	400 m	46.33
2017	European U23 Championships	Bydgoszcz, Poland	3rd	400 m	46.08
2019	European U23 Championships	Gävle, Sweden	9th (sf)	400 m	47.17
2022	World Indoor Championships	Belgrade, Serbia	4th	400 m	45.67
2022	World Championships	Eugene, United States	26th (h)	400 m	46.27
2022	European Championships	Munich, Germany	5th (h)	400 m	45.50^{1}

^{1}Did not start in the semifinal

== Personal bests ==
Outdoor

- 100 metres – 10.73 (+0.9 m/s, Copenhagen 2016)
- 200 metres – 21.09 (+1.0 m/s, Tallahassee 2018)
- 400 metres – 45.85 (Bydgoszcz 2017)

Indoor

- 200 metres – 20.97 (Fayetteville 2019)
- 400 metres – 46.07 (Birmingham, AL 2019)
