= Yavuz Can =

Turkish sprinter (born 1987)

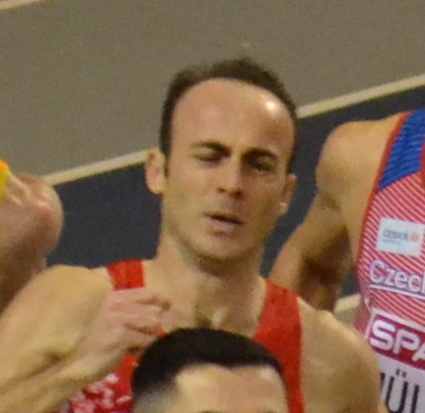
Yavuz Can in 2019

Yavuz Can (born 23 February 1987) is a Turkish sprinter specialising in the 400 Metres.

== Career ==
He won the silver medal in the 4 × 400 Metres Relay at the 2013 Mediterranean Games. In addition, he competed at two outdoor and two indoor European Championships, as well as the 2012 World Indoor Championships in his native land, Turkey.

His personal bests in the 400 Metres are 45.64 seconds outdoors (Zeulenroda, 2016) and 46.87 seconds indoors (Istanbul, 2015), both performances were labelled as Turkish national record in these disciplines.

== Competition record ==
Year	Competition	Venue	Position	Event	Notes
Representing Turkey
2011	Universiade	Shenzhen, China	10th (sf)	400 m	46.55
2012	World Indoor Championships	Istanbul, Turkey	10th (h)	4x400 m relay	3:11.28
2012	European Championships	Helsinki, Finland	–	400 m	DQ
2012	European Championships	Helsinki, Finland	13th (h)	4x400 m relay	3:11.44
2013	European Indoor Championships	Gothenburg, Sweden	9th (sf)	400 m	47.26
2013	Mediterranean Games	Mersin, Turkey	6th	400 m	46.70
2013	Mediterranean Games	Mersin, Turkey	2nd	4x400 m relay	3:05.28
2013	Universiade	Kazan, Russia	10th (sf)	400 m	46.65
2013	Universiade	Kazan, Russia	3rd	4x400 m relay	3:06.36
2014	European Championships	Zürich, Switzerland	32nd (h)	400 m	46.90
2014	European Championships	Zürich, Switzerland	12th (h)	4x400 m relay	3:07.68
2015	European Indoor Championships	Prague, Czech Republic	13th (sf)	400 m	47.81
2016	World Indoor Championships	Portland, United States	8th (sf)	400 m	46.82
2016	European Championships	Amsterdam, Netherlands	7th (sf)	400 m	45.51
2016	European Championships	Amsterdam, Netherlands	9th (h)	4x400 m relay	3:04.65
2017	Islamic Solidarity Games	Baku, Azerbaijan	5th (sf)	400 m	46.64
2017	Islamic Solidarity Games	Baku, Azerbaijan	1st	4 × 400 m relay	3:06.83
2017	World Championships	London, United Kingdom	16th (h)	4 × 400 m relay	3:15.45
2018	Mediterranean Games	Tarragona, Spain	5th	400 m	46.37
2018	Mediterranean Games	Tarragona, Spain	4th	4 × 400 m relay	3:05.28
2018	European Championships	Berlin, Germany	20th (h)	400 m	46.58
2018	European Championships	Berlin, Germany	13th (h)	4 × 400 m relay	3:07.83
2019	European Indoor Championships	Glasgow, United Kingdom	14th (h)	400 m	47.63
2021	World Relays	Chorzów, Poland	12th (h)	4 × 400 m relay	3:06.05
