= Luka Janežič =

Slovenian sprinter (born 1995)

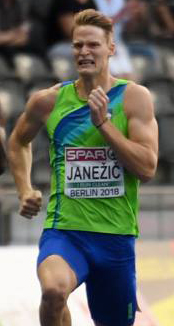

Personal information
- Full name: Luka Janežič in 2018
- Born: 14 November 1995 (age 30) Vodice, Slovenia
- Height: 1.92 m (6 ft 4 in)
- Weight: 80 kg (176 lb)

Sport
- Sport: Athletics
- Event: 400 m
- Club: AK Medvode; AD Kladivar Celje
- Coached by: Rok Predanič

Luka Janežič (born 14 November 1995) is a Slovenian sprinter. He competed in the 400 metres event at the 2015 World Championships in Beijing without advancing from the first round. In the 2016 Olympic Games, Janežič advanced to the 400 m semifinals and exceeded his own national record in the event.

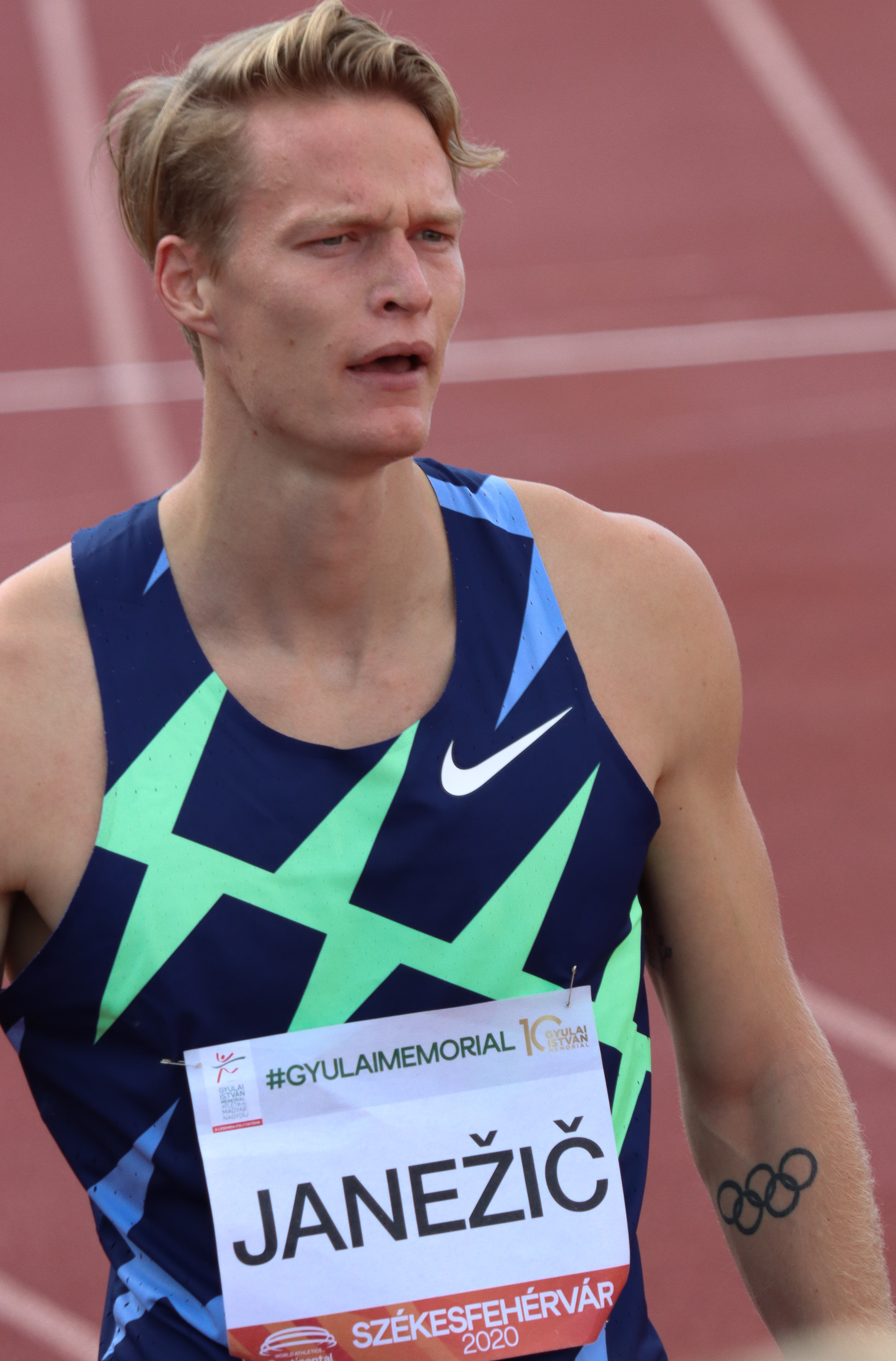
Luka Janezic at the 2020 Gyulai Memorial in Szekesfehervar, Hungary

== Competition record ==
Year	Competition	Venue	Position	Event	Notes
Representing Slovenia
2011	World Youth Championships	Lille, France	44th (h)	200 m	22.49
2013	European Junior Championships	Rieti, Italy	10th (sf)	200 m	21.27
2013	European Junior Championships	Rieti, Italy	9th (sf)	400 m	47.31
2014	World Junior Championships	Eugene, United States	21st (sf)	200 m	21.41
2014	World Junior Championships	Eugene, United States	12th (sf)	400 m	47.06
2015	European Indoor Championships	Prague, Czech Republic	3rd (h)	400 m	46.98^{1}
2015	European U23 Championships	Tallinn, Estonia	3rd	400 m	45.73
2015	World Championships	Beijing, China	28th (h)	400 m	45.28
2016	World Indoor Championships	Portland, United States	9th (h)	400 m	46.79^{2}
2016	European Championships	Amsterdam, Netherlands	5th	400 m	45.65
2016	Olympic Games	Rio de Janeiro, Brazil	17th (sf)	400 m	45.07
2017	European Indoor Championships	Belgrade, Serbia	DSQ	400 m	—
2017	European U23 Championships	Bydgoszcz, Poland	1st	400 m	45.33
2017	World Championships	London, United Kingdom	36th (h)	400 m	46.06
2018	World Indoor Championships	Birmingham, United Kingdom	7th (sf)	400 m	46.37
2018	European Championships	Berlin, Germany	5th	400 m	45.43
2019	European Indoor Championships	Glasgow, United Kingdom	4th	400 m	46.15
2019	World Championships	Doha, Qatar	33rd (h)	400 m	46.84
2021	European Indoor Championships	Toruń, Poland	6th	400 m	47.22
2021	Olympic Games	Tokyo, Japan	15th (sf)	400 m	45.36

^{1}Did not start in the semifinals

^{2}Disqualified in the semifinals

== Personal bests ==
Outdoor

- 200 metres – 20.89 (−1.1 m/s, Kranj 2015)
- 400 metres – 44.84 (Monaco 2017) NR

Indoor

- 400 metres – 46.02 (Vienna 2017) NR
