= Pavel Maslák =

Czech sprinter

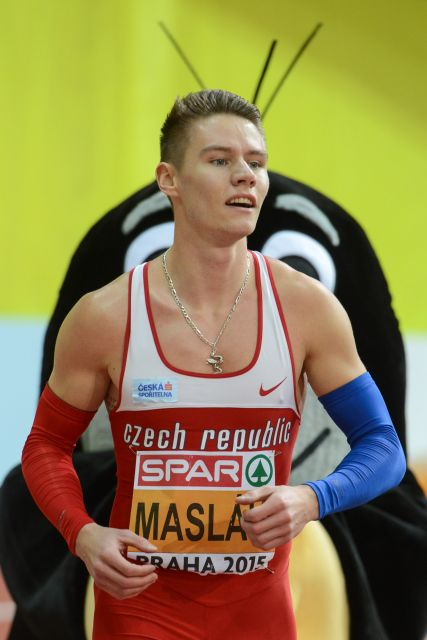
- Pavel Maslák at the 2015 European Indoor Championships

Personal information
- Nationality: Czech
- Born: 21 February 1991 (age 35) Havířov, Czechoslovakia
- Height: 1.76 m (5 ft 9 in)
- Weight: 67 kg (148 lb)

Sport
- Sport: Athletics
- Club: ASC Dukla Praha
- Coached by: Dalibor Kupka
Medal record
World Indoor Championship
Gold medal – first place	2014 Sopot	400 m
Gold medal – first place	2016 Portland	400 m
Gold medal – first place	2018 Birmingham	400 m
World Indoor Tour
Winner	2017	400 m
European Championships
Gold medal – first place	2012 Helsinki	400 m
Silver medal – second place	2016 Amsterdam	400 m
European Indoor Championships
Gold medal – first place	2013 Gothenburg	400 m
Gold medal – first place	2015 Prague	400 m
Gold medal – first place	2017 Belgrade	400 m
Silver medal – second place	2021 Toruń	4 × 400 m relay
Bronze medal – third place	2013 Gothenburg	4 × 400 m relay
Bronze medal – third place	2015 Prague	4 × 400 m relay
Bronze medal – third place	2017 Belgrade	4 × 400 m relay
European U23 Championships
Bronze medal – third place	2011 Ostrava	200 m
Bronze medal – third place	2013 Tampere	200 m
European Junior Championships
Silver medal – second place	2009 Novi Sad	4 × 100 m relay

Pavel Maslák (Czech pronunciation: [ˈpavɛl ˈmaslaːk], born 21 February 1991) is a Czech sprinter who specialises in the 200 metres and 400 metres. He is the only athlete in history who has won the 400 m title at the World Indoor Championships at three consecutive championships. Maslák is the first Czech to have run 400 metres under 45 seconds outdoor and under 46 seconds indoor.

== Personal life ==
Pavel Maslák was born on 21 February 1991 in Havířov, Czechoslovakia.

== Career ==
He is a member of Dalibor Kupka's training group at ASC Dukla Praha. At the age of 20, Maslák won the 400 m bronze medal at the 2011 European Athletics U23 Championships and was a semi-finalist in the 200 m at the 2011 World Championships in Athletics. The next year, he finished fifth in the final of the 400 m at the 2012 IAAF World Indoor Championships.

In May 2012, Maslák set the Czech record in 400 m. His time of 45.31 cut almost half a second off the time reached by Karel Kolář at the same venue — Rošický Stadium — in 1978. In June 2012, he further improved the record by clocking 45.17 in Turin. At the 2012 European Championships, Maslák won 400 m gold medal in a time of 45.24.

At 2012 Summer Olympics in London, Maslák competed in the 200 and 400 m events. In the 400 metres, he advanced from heats by setting a new national record and personal best of 44.91 but did not manage to repeat the feat in semi-finals and finished fifth in his run. In the 200 metres, Maslák finished fourth in Heat 5 in a time of 20.67 and did not progress further. In his last race of the 2012 season, Maslák set a national record of 20.59 in 200 metres dash.

At 2013 European Indoor Championships in Gothenburg, Pavel Maslák won a gold medal in 400 metres distance. In final, he slashed almost half a second from his personal best, improving it to 45.66. As a part of the Czech 4 × 400 metres relay team, he added a bronze medal. At the 2013 World Championships, he achieved his best outdoor World Championship finish of 5th.

He won his first indoor world title in 2014.

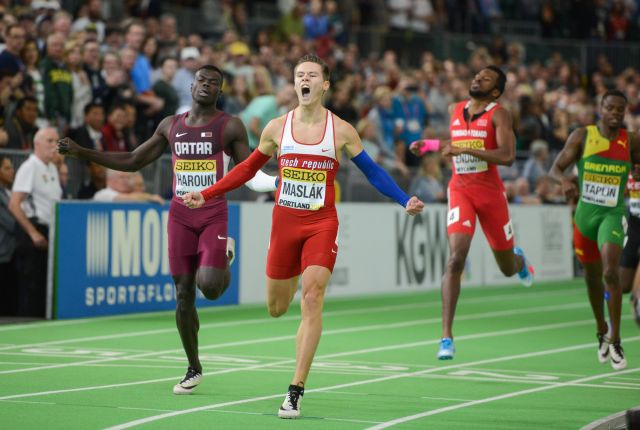
Maslák winning the 400 meter event at the 2016 IAAF World Indoor Championships

During the 2016 season Maslák won gold in the 400 meters at the IAAF World Indoor Championships, defending his world title, and came second at the European Athletics Championships. At the 2018 IAAF World Indoor Championships he successfully defended his 400-meter title a second time with a time of 45.47 seconds.

== Personal bests ==
Outdoor

- 100 m 10.30 (9 June 2017, Třinec, Czech Republic)
- 200 m 20.46 NR (9 June 2017, Třinec, Czech Republic)
- 400 m 44.79 NR (11 May 2014, Doha, Qatar)
- 500 m 1:00:35 (03 Aug 2013, Cheb, Czech Republic)

Indoor

- 60 m 6.65 (15 Feb 2014, Praha (Stromovka), Czech Republic
- 200 m 20.52 (15 February 2014, Praha (Stromovka), Czech Republic)
- 400 m 45.24 NR (8 March 2014, Sopot, Poland)
- 500 m 1:00.36 (25 Feb 2014, Praha (O2 Arena), Czech Republic
