= Donald Sanford (sprinter) =

Israeli sprinter of American descent

Donald Blair-Sanford
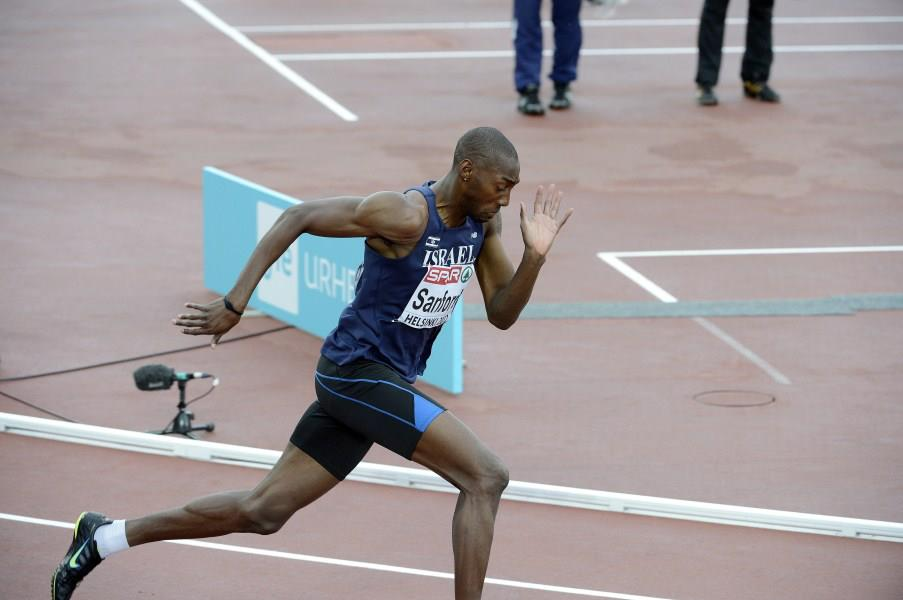

Personal information
- Native name: דונלד בלייר-סנפורד
- Full name: Donald Eugene Blair-Sanford
- Nickname: DBS
- Citizenship: American–Israeli
- Born: February 5, 1987 (age 39) Inglewood, California, U.S.
- Home town: Ein Shemer, Israel
- Education: Morgan State University; Central Arizona College; Arizona State University
- Height: 1.96 m (6 ft 5 in)
- Weight: 80 kg (180 lb)
- Spouse: Danielle Dekel

Sport
- Country: Israel
- Sport: Athletics
- Event: 400m
- Club: Maccabi Tel Aviv
- Coached by: Lloyd Cowan

Achievements and titles
- Personal bests: 400m; 45.04 seconds
Medal record
Representing Israel
European Championships
Bronze medal – third place	2014 Zurich	400 m
European Games
Bronze medal – third place	2015 Baku	Mixed team
Representing Europe
Continental Cup
Silver medal – second place	2014 Marrakesh	4 × 400 m relay
- Updated on October 10, 2015

Donald Eugene Blair-Sanford (Hebrew: דונלד יוג'ין בלייר-סנפורד; born February 5, 1987) is an American-Israeli Olympic sprinter, who specialises in the 400 metre dash.

His personal record at 400 metres is 45.04 seconds. He represented Israel in the 2012 Summer Olympics. He won the bronze medal in 400 metres at the 2014 European Athletics Championships, with a new Israeli record of 45.27 seconds. Competing for Israel at the 2015 European Games, Sanford won with a time of 45.75.

== Early life ==
Sanford was born, one of four children, in Inglewood in Los Angeles County, California, to Donald E. Sanford Jr. and Debra Blair, who had run track in high school. He attended City Honors High School in Inglewood but competed for Morningside High School. He won the 400m dash at the California Interscholastic Federation Division III Championships, and was a member of the National Honor Society.

He competed for one season at Morgan State University, running a season-best time of 46.92 to place second at the IC4A Championships.

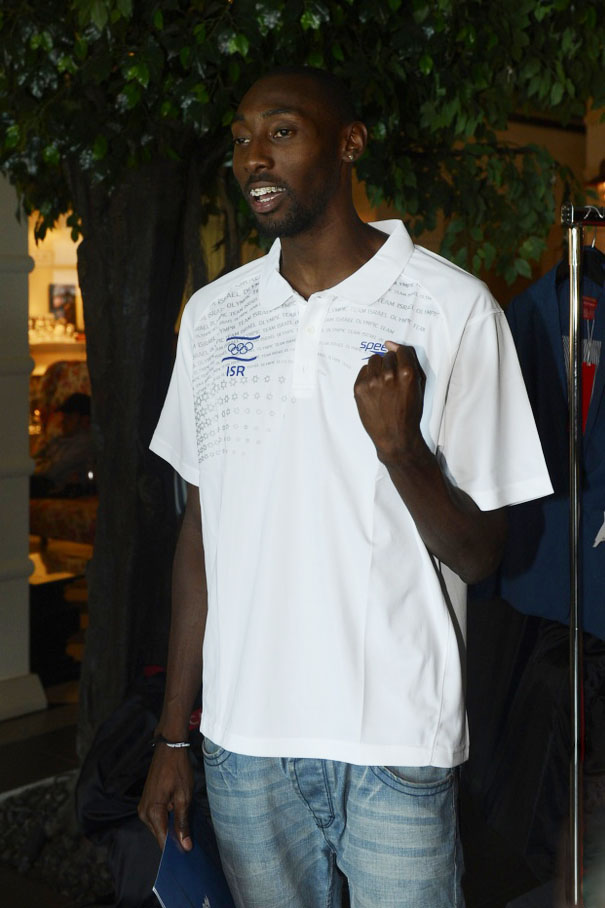
Donald Sanford

He became an Israeli citizen after marrying Israeli basketball player Danielle Dekel, whom he met when they were both students at Central Arizona College where she was playing basketball for the school. He earned an associate degree at Central Arizona in 2007, where he ran on two NJCAA Outdoor Championship teams (in 2006 and 2007).

He also studied at Arizona State University, which he represented in athletic competitions within the United States, and set his 400m personal record of 45.21 seconds. He was the 2010 NCAA runner-up at 400 meters and was part of the 4×400-meter indoor and outdoor relays that season, and was named an All-American.

== Achievements ==
Sanford's club is Maccabi Tel Aviv, and he is coached by Lloyd Cowan.

In 2012, Sanford represented Israel for the first time at a major sporting event, finishing 4th at the European Athletic Championships, held in Helsinki, nine-hundredths of a second away from a medal at 45.91 seconds.

A little over a month later, he ran in the 2012 Summer Olympics. His shoes were stolen from his bag just ahead of his qualifying heat, and he had to run in a teammate's shoes. He finished fifth in a time of 45.71 seconds, in a race won by double-amputee South African Oscar Pistorius, and did not make it out of the qualifying rounds. He was ranked 26th, two places and one-tenth of a second behind the runners who qualified for the semifinals.

At the 2013 Maccabiah Games, Sanford broke the Israeli record and won the gold medal in the 400 meter race with a time of 45.65, defeating Australian Olympic finalist Steven Solomon.

In 2014, Sanford won the bronze medal in the 400 metres sprint at the European Athletic Championships held in Zurich on August 15, 2014, with a new Israeli record of 45.27 seconds. He dedicated his medal to the Israel Defense Forces. He was the second Israeli to win a medal at the European Athletic Championships, after Alex Averbukh won gold medals in the pole vault in 2002 and 2006.

In December 2014, he was named Israeli Sportsman of the Year.

In June 2015, competing for Israel at the 2015 European Games, Sanford won the 400 m in 45.75, a European Games record, as Team Israel won a bronze medal.

Sanford competed for Israel at the 2016 Summer Olympics. He ran the 400m and finished in 5th place in his heat in a time of 46.06, 10 split-seconds behind the semi-final qualifying time, and placed 33rd overall.

== Personal life ==
Sanford and his wife, Israeli native Danielle Dekel-Sanford, married in 2008, and live in Kibbutz Ein Shemer about an hour north of Tel Aviv with their children, Amerie Ann and Rylee. His wife's father, Ehud Dekel, was the first Israeli to compete in four different sports in Israel's highest sports league, the First League. His older sister, Donnisha "CoCoa" Sanford was a member of the 2004 Pac-10 regular-season championship team for the University of Arizona women's basketball team. She also played professional basketball overseas from 2009 to 2012.

== Personal bests ==
Distance	Time	Place	Date
400m	45.21 sec	Eugene, United States	June 13, 2010
400m	45.27 sec	Zurich, Switzerland	August 15, 2014
400m	45.04 sec	Zhukovsky, Russia	July 19, 2015

== See also ==
- List of Israeli records in athletics
- List of Maccabiah records in athletics
