= 2008 World Junior Championships in Athletics – Men's 4 × 400 metres relay =

The men's 4x400 metres relay event at the 2008 World Junior Championships in Athletics was held in Bydgoszcz, Poland, at Zawisza Stadium on 12 and 13 July.

== Medalists ==
Gold	Marcus Boyd; Bryan Miller; O'Neal Wilder; Jeshua Anderson; United States
Silver	Louis Persent; Robert Davis; Nigel Levine; Jordan McGrath; United Kingdom
Bronze	Niklas Zender; Alexander Juretzko; Marc-John Dombrowski; Pascal Nabow; Germany

== Results ==
=== Final ===
13 July

Rank	Nation	Competitors	Time	Notes
1st place, gold medalist(s)	United States	Marcus Boyd; Bryan Miller; O'Neal Wilder; Jeshua Anderson	3:03.86	
2nd place, silver medalist(s)	United Kingdom	Louis Persent; Robert Davis; Nigel Levine; Jordan McGrath	3:05.82	
3rd place, bronze medalist(s)	Germany	Niklas Zender; Alexander Juretzko; Marc-John Dombrowski; Pascal Nabow	3:06.47	
4	Jamaica	Kevin Williams; Nickel Ashmeade; Rolando Berch; Akino Ming	3:08.58	
5	Poland	Arkadiusz Wojno; Michał Pietrzak; Rafał Omelko; Jakub Krzewina	3:08.65	
6	Nigeria	Nkami Edu; Noah Akwu; Ayokunle Odelusi; Victor Isaiah	3:12.56	
7	Bahamas	Juan Lewis; Jeffery Gibson; Lesley Hanna; La'Sean Pickstock	3:21.75	
	Trinidad and Tobago	Darnell Greig; Jovon Toppin; Emanuel Mayers; Zwede Hewitt	DQ	IAAF rule 170.8

=== Heats ===
12 July

==== Heat 1 ====
Rank	Nation	Competitors	Time	Notes
1	Jamaica	Kevin Williams; Rolando Berch; Akino Ming; Ramone McKenzie	3:09.17	Q
2	Bahamas	Juan Lewis; Jeffery Gibson; Lesley Hanna; La'sean Pickstock	3:10.10	Q
3	Hungary	Martin Godaish; Zoltán Kovács; Máté Lukács; Marcell Deák Nagy	3:10.20	
4	Ukraine	Serhiy Zavyalov; Igor Lukashchuk; Roman Starukh; Denys Teslenko	3:11.24	
5	Puerto Rico	Miguel López; René Claudio; Carlos Benítez; Juan Carlos Vega	3:12.58	
6	Kenya	Silvester Kirwa Meli; Julius Oletygor; Geoffrey Kibet; John Kituu Wambua	3:13.44	
7	Australia	Adam Bevis; Kurt Mulcahy; James Kaan; Craig Huffer	3:13.84	
8	Lithuania	Valdas Valintelis; Edvinas Godvisas; Tomas Petrauskas; Silvestras Guogis	3:16.75	
9	Senegal	Moustapha Tounkara; Ibrahima Seye; Papa Ousmane Ndiaye; Aliou Wagne	3:17.71	

==== Heat 2 ====
Rank	Nation	Competitors	Time	Notes
1	United Kingdom	Louis Persent; Robert Davis; Nigel Levine; Jordan McGrath	3:06.85	Q
2	Trinidad and Tobago	Darnell Greig; Jovon Toppin; Jehue Gordon; Zwede Hewitt	3:07.60	Q
3	Poland	Jakub Krzewina; Michał Pietrzak; Rafał Omelko; Arkadiusz Wojno	3:09.23	q
4	Japan	Tomoharu Kino; Akihiro Urano; Junpei Hamano; Hideyuki Hirose	3:09.61	
5	Spain	Alejandro Guerrero; Marc Orozco; Luis Lizán; Cristian González	3:10.72	
6	Saudi Arabia	Yonas Al-Hosah; Ali Al-Deraan; Adel Al-Nasser; Ismail Al-Sabani	3:11.37	
7	Czech Republic	Petr Vanek; Tomáš Krupka; Pavel Maslák; Petr Langmaier	3:12.62	

==== Heat 3 ====
Rank	Nation	Competitors	Time	Notes
1	United States	Marcus Boyd; Bryan Miller; Ryan Bailey; Christian Taylor	3:05.25	Q
2	Germany	Niklas Zender; Alexander Juretzko; Clemens Höfer; Pascal Nabow	3:07.35	Q
3	Nigeria	Nkami Edu; Noah Akwu; Ayokunle Odelusi; Victor Isaiah	3:08.69	q
4	Ireland	Curtis Woods; Billy Ryan; Jason Harvey; Brian Gregan	3:10.17	
5	Botswana	Thapelo Ketlogetswe; Pako Seribe; Shaka Ntsimako; Itseng Batsholelwang	3:11.08	
6	Italy	Domenico Fontana; Giacomo Panizza; Alessandro Pedrazzoli; Mario Scapini	3:11.33	
7	South Africa	PC Beneke; André Olivier; Raaghid Fredericks; Cornel Fredericks	3:12.09	
8	France	Martial Minyem; Tom Chouquet; Hugo Grillas; Hafidhou Attoumani	3:13.71	

== Participation ==
According to an unofficial count, 101 athletes from 24 countries participated in the event.

- Australia (4)
- Bahamas (4)
- Botswana (4)
- Czech Republic (4)
- France (4)
- Germany (5)
- Hungary (4)
- Ireland (4)
- Italy (4)
- Jamaica (5)
- Japan (4)
- Kenya (4)
- Lithuania (4)
- Nigeria (4)
- Poland (4)
- Puerto Rico (4)
- Saudi Arabia (4)
- Senegal (4)
- South Africa (4)
- Spain (4)
- Trinidad and Tobago (5)
- Ukraine (4)
- United Kingdom (4)
- United States (6)
