= 2008 World Junior Championships in Athletics – Men's 400 metres =

The men's 400 metres event at the 2008 World Junior Championships in Athletics was held in Bydgoszcz, Poland, at Zawisza Stadium on 8, 9 and 10 July.

== Medalists ==
Gold	Marcus Boyd; United States
Silver	Kirani James; Grenada
Bronze	O'Neal Wilder; United States

== Results ==
=== Final ===
10 July

Rank	Name	Nationality	Time	Notes
1st place, gold medalist(s)	Marcus Boyd	United States	45.53	
2nd place, silver medalist(s)	Kirani James	Grenada	45.70	
3rd place, bronze medalist(s)	O'Neal Wilder	United States	45.76	
4	Kurt Mulcahy	Australia	46.54	
5	Niklas Zender	Germany	46.78	
6	Daniel Harper	Canada	47.20	
7	Jordan McGrath	United Kingdom	47.81	
	Brian Gregan	Ireland	DQ	IAAF rule 163.3

=== Semifinals ===
9 July

==== Semifinal 1 ====
Rank	Name	Nationality	Time	Notes
1	Kirani James	Grenada	46.55	Q
2	Marcus Boyd	United States	46.88	Q
3	Petr Vaněk	Czech Republic	47.22	
4	Marcell Deák Nagy	Hungary	47.43	
5	Jānis Leitis	Latvia	47.51	
6	Awad El-Karim Makki	Sudan	48.21	
7	Juan Lewis	Bahamas	48.30	
8	Hideyuki Hirose	Japan	48.30	
9	Akihiro Urano	Japan	48.34	

==== Semifinal 2 ====
Rank	Name	Nationality	Time	Notes
1	Niklas Zender	Germany	46.78	Q
2	Brian Gregan	Ireland	46.88	Q
3	Nigel Levine	United Kingdom	47.14	
4	Zwede Hewitt	Trinidad and Tobago	47.36	
5	Vladimir Krasnov	Russia	47.38	
6	Silvester Kirwa Meli	Kenya	47.73	
7	Pétros Kiriakídis	Greece	48.03	
8	Ismail Al-Sabani	Saudi Arabia	48.04	

==== Semifinal 3 ====
Rank	Name	Nationality	Time	Notes
1	O'Neal Wilder	United States	46.08	Q
2	Kurt Mulcahy	Australia	46.56	Q
3	Daniel Harper	Canada	46.81	q
4	Jordan McGrath	United Kingdom	47.13	q
5	Rondell Bartholomew	Grenada	47.60	
6	Juan Carlos Vega	Puerto Rico	47.94	
7	Mauritz Kåshagen	Norway	48.22	
8	Curtis Kock	Netherlands Antilles	48.36	

=== Heats ===
8 July

==== Heat 1 ====
Rank	Name	Nationality	Time	Notes
1	Niklas Zender	Germany	47.34	Q
2	Juan Lewis	Bahamas	47.78	Q
3	Marcell Deák Nagy	Hungary	47.85	Q
4	Arkadiusz Wojno	Poland	48.17	
5	Bacar Jannot	Comoros	48.38	
6	Alejandro Guerrero	Spain	49.20	
7	Alessandro Pedrazzoli	Italy	50.80	
	Victor Isaiah	Nigeria	DQ	IAAF rule 163.3

==== Heat 2 ====
Rank	Name	Nationality	Time	Notes
1	Hideyuki Hirose	Japan	47.86	Q
2	Jānis Leitis	Latvia	47.95	Q
3	Pétros Kiriakídis	Greece	48.24	Q
4	Darnell Greig	Trinidad and Tobago	48.42	
5	Yonas Al-Hosah	Saudi Arabia	48.47	
6	Roman Starukh	Ukraine	48.90	
7	Juraj Mokráš	Slovakia	49.29	
8	Noah Akwu	Nigeria	49.45	

==== Heat 3 ====
Rank	Name	Nationality	Time	Notes
1	O'Neal Wilder	United States	46.82	Q
2	Juan Carlos Vega	Puerto Rico	48.03	Q
3	Curtis Kock	Netherlands Antilles	48.21	Q
4	Kevin Williams	Jamaica	48.42	
5	Denys Teslenko	Ukraine	48.49	
6	Marc Orozco	Spain	48.61	
7	Tom Chouquet	France	49.06	
8	Marvin Augustine	Dominica	52.08	
9	Peter Semper	Montserrat	54.87	

==== Heat 4 ====
Rank	Name	Nationality	Time	Notes
1	Kirani James	Grenada	46.53	Q
2	Daniel Harper	Canada	47.18	Q
3	Jordan McGrath	United Kingdom	47.38	Q
4	Vladimir Krasnov	Russia	47.73	q
5	Domenico Fontana	Italy	47.99	
6	Pascal Nabow	Germany	48.06	
7	La'Sean Pickstock	Bahamas	48.54	
8	Akino Ming	Jamaica	49.08	

==== Heat 5 ====
Rank	Name	Nationality	Time	Notes
1	Brian Gregan	Ireland	47.32	Q
2	Silvester Kirwa Meli	Kenya	47.34	Q
3	Ismail Al-Sabani	Saudi Arabia	47.39	Q
4	Petr Vaněk	Czech Republic	47.78	q
5	Jakub Krzewina	Poland	47.97	
6	Rasmus Olsen	Denmark	48.46	
7	Hafidhou Attoumani	France	48.56	
8	Fadi Ba-Hafs	Yemen	51.53	

==== Heat 6 ====
Rank	Name	Nationality	Time	Notes
1	Marcus Boyd	United States	47.56	Q
2	Rondell Bartholomew	Grenada	47.85	Q
3	Awad El-Karim Makki	Sudan	47.93	Q
4	Erik Voncina	Slovenia	48.20	
5	Zoltán Kovács	Hungary	48.25	
6	Endrik Zilberstein	Georgia	48.58	
7	José Antonio Flores	Mexico	49.36	
8	Isoa Me	Fiji	49.40	
9	Wong Man Hou	Macau	54.57	

==== Heat 7 ====
Rank	Name	Nationality	Time	Notes
1	Kurt Mulcahy	Australia	47.35	Q
2	Nigel Levine	United Kingdom	47.38	Q
3	Zwede Hewitt	Trinidad and Tobago	47.45	Q
4	Mauritz Kåshagen	Norway	47.75	q
5	Bereket Desta	Ethiopia	47.80	
6	Akihiro Urano	Japan	48.07	
7	Arnaud Froidmont	Belgium	48.47	
8	Fabian Norgrove	Barbados	49.10	

== Participation ==
According to an unofficial count, 58 athletes from 42 countries participated in the event.

- Australia (1)
- Bahamas (2)
- Barbados (1)
- Belgium (1)
- Canada (1)
- Comoros (1)
- Czech Republic (1)
- Denmark (1)
- Dominica (1)
- Ethiopia (1)
- Fiji (1)
- France (2)
- Georgia (1)
- Germany (2)
- Greece (1)
- Grenada (2)
- Hungary (2)
- Ireland (1)
- Italy (2)
- Jamaica (2)
- Japan (2)
- Kenya (1)
- Latvia (1)
- Macau (1)
- Mexico (1)
- Montserrat (1)
- Netherlands Antilles (1)
- Nigeria (2)
- Norway (1)
- Poland (2)
- Puerto Rico (1)
- Russia (1)
- Saudi Arabia (2)
- Slovakia (1)
- Slovenia (1)
- Spain (2)
- Sudan (1)
- Trinidad and Tobago (2)
- Ukraine (2)
- United Kingdom (2)
- United States (2)
- Yemen (1)
