= 2008 World Junior Championships in Athletics – Women's high jump =

Athletics Event

The women's high jump event at the 2008 World Junior Championships in Athletics was held in Bydgoszcz, Poland, at Zawisza Stadium on 8 and 10 July.

== Medalists ==
Gold	Kimberly Jess; Germany
Silver	Mirela Demireva; Bulgaria
Bronze	Hannelore Desmet; Belgium
Bronze	Lesyaní Mayor; Cuba

== Results ==
=== Final ===
10 July

Rank	Name	Nationality	Result	Notes
1st place, gold medalist(s)	Kimberly Jess	Germany	1.86	
2nd place, silver medalist(s)	Mirela Demireva	Bulgaria	1.86	
3rd place, bronze medalist(s)	Hannelore Desmet	Belgium	1.86	
3rd place, bronze medalist(s)	Lesyaní Mayor	Cuba	1.86	
5	Zoe Timmers	Australia	1.82	
6	Esthera Petre	Romania	1.82	
7	Natalya Mamlina	Russia	1.82	
8	Anja Saumweber	Germany	1.78	
8	Ellen Björklund	Sweden	1.78	
10	Burcu Ayhan	Turkey	1.78	
10	Shanay Briscoe	United States	1.78	
12	Esther van der Lijcke	Netherlands	1.73	
13	Pamela Hughes	Ireland	1.73	

=== Qualifications ===
8 July

==== Group A ====
Rank	Name	Nationality	Result	Notes
1	Zoe Timmers	Australia	1.81	q
1	Hannelore Desmet	Belgium	1.81	q
3	Esthera Petre	Romania	1.81	q
4	Burcu Ayhan	Turkey	1.81	q
5	Pamela Hughes	Ireland	1.78	q
6	Ellen Björklund	Sweden	1.78	q
7	Anja Saumweber	Germany	1.78	q
8	Maryia Nestsiarchuk	Belarus	1.78	
8	Ana Šimic	Croatia	1.78	
8	Yekaterina Bolshakova	Russia	1.78	
11	Michalina Kwasniewska	Poland	1.74	
12	Jessica Merriweather	United States	1.74	
13	Tonje Angelsen	Norway	1.70	
14	Barbara Szabó	Hungary	1.65	
14	Ilva Bikanova	Latvia	1.65	
	Marcoleen Pretorius	South Africa	NH	

==== Group B ====
Rank	Name	Nationality	Result	Notes
1	Kimberly Jess	Germany	1.81	q
2	Natalya Mamlina	Russia	1.81	q
2	Shanay Briscoe	United States	1.81	q
4	Mirela Demireva	Bulgaria	1.81	q
5	Esther van der Lijcke	Netherlands	1.78	q
6	Lesyaní Mayor	Cuba	1.78	q
7	Martyna Bielawaska	Poland	1.78	
8	Marija Vuković	Montenegro	1.78	
8	Ezgi Sevilmis	Turkey	1.78	
10	Holly Parent	Canada	1.74	
10	Dímitra Nazíri	Greece	1.74	
12	Airinė Palšytė	Lithuania	1.74	
13	Victoria Dronsfield	Sweden	1.74	
14	Marina Schneider	Austria	1.74	
14	Magdalena Nová	Czech Republic	1.74	
16	Klára Ábelová	Slovakia	1.70	
17	Elena Vallortigara	Italy	1.65	

== Participation ==
According to an unofficial count, 33 athletes from 27 countries participated in the event.

- Australia (1)
- Austria (1)
- Belarus (1)
- Belgium (1)
- Bulgaria (1)
- Canada (1)
- Croatia (1)
- Cuba (1)
- Czech Republic (1)
- Germany (2)
- Greece (1)
- Hungary (1)
- Ireland (1)
- Italy (1)
- Latvia (1)
- Lithuania (1)
- Montenegro (1)
- Netherlands (1)
- Norway (1)
- Poland (2)
- Romania (1)
- Russia (2)
- Slovakia (1)
- South Africa (1)
- Sweden (2)
- Turkey (2)
- United States (2)
