= Brian Gregan =

Irish sprinter

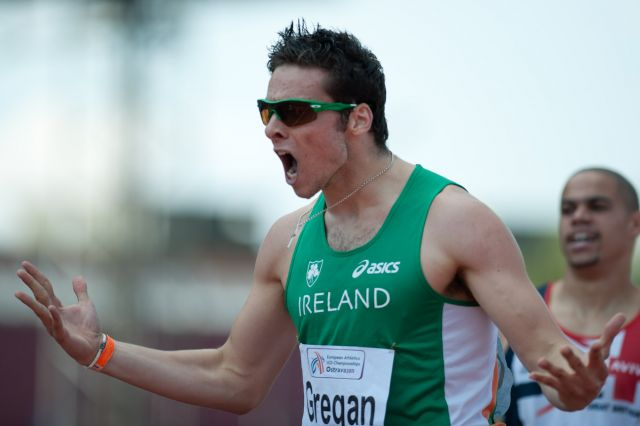
- Brian Gregan in Ostrava in 2011

Personal information
- Nationality: Irish
- Born: 31 December 1989 (age 36) Dublin, Ireland

Sport
- Sport: Athletics
- Event: 400 metres

Achievements and titles
- Personal best: 400 m: 45.26 s

Brian Gregan (born 31 December 1989) is an Irish sprinter, born in Dublin.

Gregan attended St Mark's Community School in Tallaght. In his earlier career Gregan represented Tallaght Athletic Club before going on to represent Clonliffe Harriers.

== Achievements ==
Year	Competition	Venue	Position	Event	Notes
Representing Ireland
2008	World Junior Championships	Bydgoszcz, Poland	6th (sf)	400 m	46.88
2008	World Junior Championships	Bydgoszcz, Poland	10th (h)	4 × 400 m relay	3:10.17
2009	European U23 Championships	Kaunas, Lithuania	–	400 m	DNF
2010	World Indoor Championships	Doha, Qatar	16th (h)	400 m	47.26
2010	World Indoor Championships	Doha, Qatar	11th (h)	4 × 400 m relay	3:13.00
2010	European Championships	Barcelona, Spain	26th (h)	400 m	46.90
2010	European Championships	Barcelona, Spain	11th (h)	4 × 400 m relay	3:07.21
2011	European Indoor Championships	Paris, France	11th (h)	400 m	47.63
2011	European U23 Championships	Ostrava, Czech Republic	2nd	400 m	46.12
2011	Universiade	Shenzhen, China	5th	400 m	45.96
2012	European Championships	Helsinki, Finland	6th	400 m	46.04
2013	European Indoor Championships	Gothenburg, Sweden	6th (h)	400 m	46.97
2013	Universiade	Kazan, Russia	5th	400 m	45.83
2013	World Championships	Moscow, Russia	21st (sf)	400 m	45.98
2014	European Championships	Zürich, Switzerland	10th (sf)	400 m	45.81
2014	European Championships	Zürich, Switzerland	5th	4 × 400 m relay	3:01.67
2015	World Championships	Beijing, China	13th (h)	4 × 400 m relay	3:01.26
2016	European Championships	Amsterdam, Netherlands	19th (sf)	400 m	46.37
2016	European Championships	Amsterdam, Netherlands	5th	4 × 400 m relay	3:04.32
2017	European Indoor Championships	Belgrade, Serbia	12th (sf)	400 m	48.08
2017	World Championships	London, United Kingdom	19th (sf)	400 m	45.42
2022	World Indoor Championships	Belgrade, Serbia	7th (h)	4 × 400 m relay	3:08.63
