= 2013 European Athletics Indoor Championships – Men's 400 metres =

The men's 400 metres event at the 2013 European Athletics Indoor Championships was held on March 1, 2013 at 12:02 (round 1), March 2, 17:45 (semi-final) and March 3, 12:00 (final) local time.

== Records ==
Standing records prior to the 2013 European Athletics Indoor Championships
World record	Kerron Clement (USA)	44.57	Fayetteville, AR, United States	12 March 2005
European record	Thomas Schönlebe (GDR)	45.05	Sindelfingen, West Germany	5 February 1988
Championship record	Marek Plawgo (POL)	45.39	Vienna, Austria	3 March 2002
World Leading	Deon Lendore (TRI)	45.15	Fayetteville, AR, United States	23 February 2013
European Leading	Brian Gregan (IRL)	46.07	Athlone, Ireland	27 January 2013

== Results ==
=== Round 1 ===
Qualification: First 2 (Q) or and the 4 fastest athletes (q) advanced to the final.

Rank	Heat	Athlete	Nationality	Time	Note
1	4	Pavel Maslák	Czech Republic	46.54	Q
2	2	Pavel Trenikhin	Russia	46.65	Q
3	4	Nigel Levine	Great Britain	46.68	Q
4	2	Michael Bingham	Great Britain	46.92	Q
5	3	Richard Strachan	Great Britain	46.96	Q
6	1	Brian Gregan	Ireland	46.97	Q
7	1	Vitaliy Butrym	Ukraine	46.97	Q
8	1	Mamoudou Hanne	France	47.04	q
9	3	Volodymyr Burakov	Ukraine	47.16	Q
10	2	Nick Ekelund-Arenander	Denmark	47.31	q
11	1	Mateo Ružić	Croatia	47.55	q
12	3	Yavuz Can	Turkey	47.59	q
13	4	Grzegorz Sobiński	Poland	47.61	
14	1	Samuel García	Spain	47.76	
15	4	Lorenzo Valentini	Italy	47.82	
16	4	Mark Ujakpor	Spain	47.89	
17	2	Eusebio Haliti	Italy	47.93	
18	3	Felix Francois	Sweden	48.13	
19	2	Josef Prorok	Czech Republic	48.45	
20	2	Kolbeinn Hödur Gunnarsson	Iceland	48.88	
21	4	Donald Sanford	Israel	49.11	
	3	Isalbet Juarez	Italy	DNF	
	3	Thomas Jordier	France	DQ	

=== Semi-final ===
Qualification: First 3 (Q) advanced to the final.

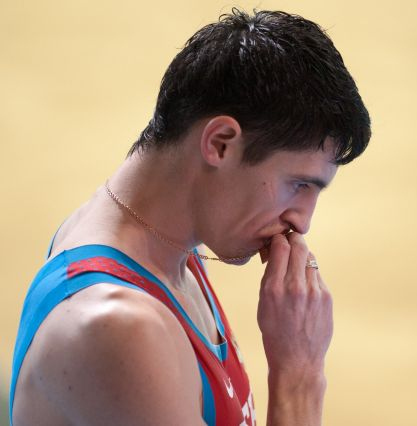
Pavel Trenikhin had the fastest time of the semifinals.

Rank	Heat	Athlete	Nationality	Time	Note
1	2	Pavel Trenikhin	Russia	46.00	Q, EL
2	1	Pavel Maslák	Czech Republic	46.18	Q, SB
3	1	Nigel Levine	Great Britain	46.50	Q
4	2	Richard Strachan	Great Britain	46.88	Q
5	2	Michael Bingham	Great Britain	46.91	Q
6	2	Vitaliy Butrym	Ukraine	47.01	
7	1	Volodymyr Burakov	Ukraine	47.03	Q
8	1	Mamoudou Hanne	France	47.08	
9	1	Yavuz Can	Turkey	47.26	SB
10	2	Nick Ekelund-Arenander	Denmark	47.33	
11	2	Mateo Ružić	Croatia	47.42	
	1	Brian Gregan	Ireland	DNF	

=== Final ===
The final was held at 12:00.

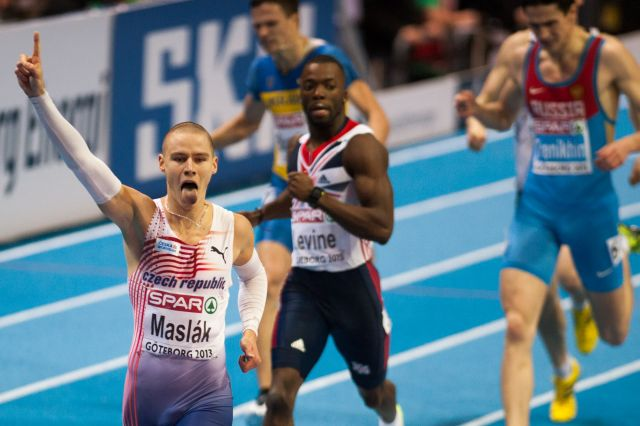
Pavel Maslák winning the final.

Rank	Lane	Athlete	Nationality	Time	Note
1st place, gold medalist(s)	5	Pavel Maslák	Czech Republic	45.66	EL, NR
2nd place, silver medalist(s)	3	Nigel Levine	Great Britain	46.21	SB
3rd place, bronze medalist(s)	6	Pavel Trenikhin	Russia	46.70	
4	2	Volodymyr Burakov	Ukraine	46.79	
5	1	Michael Bingham	Great Britain	46.81	
6	4	Richard Strachan	Great Britain	47.02	
