= 2013 European Athletics Indoor Championships – Men's 4 × 400 metres relay =

The Men's 4 × 400 metres relay race at the 2013 European Athletics Indoor Championships was held on March 3, 2013, at 18:45 local time.

== Records ==
Standing records prior to the 2011 European Athletics Indoor Championships
World record	United States (USA)	3:02.83	Maebashi, Japan	7 March 1999
European record	Poland (POL)	3:03.01	Maebashi, Japan	7 March 1999
Championship record	Poland (POL)	3:05.50	Vienna, Austria	3 March 2002
World Leading	Texas A&M University	3:04.18	Fayetteville, United States	24 February 2013
European Leading				

== Results ==
The final was held at 18:45.

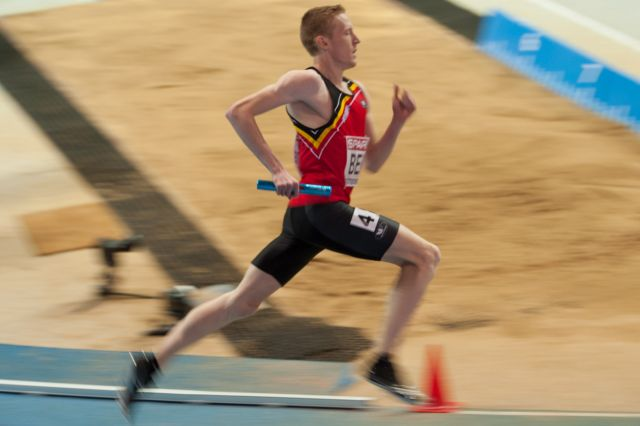
Tim Rummens running on the last leg for Belgium.

Rank	Lane	Nationality	Athlete	Time	Notes
1st place, gold medalist(s)	5	Great Britain	Michael Bingham; Richard Buck; Nigel Levine; Richard Strachan	3:05.78	
2nd place, silver medalist(s)	6	Russia	Pavel Trenikhin; Yuriy Trambovetskiy; Konstantin Svechkar; Vladimir Krasnov	3:06.96	
3rd place, bronze medalist(s)	1	Czech Republic	Daniel Němeček; Josef Prorok; Petr Lichý; Pavel Maslák	3:07.64	
4	4	Belgium	Antoine Gillet; Kevin Borlée; Arnaud Ghislain; Tim Rummens	3:07.98	
5	2	Sweden	Felix Francois; Nil de Oliveira; Johan Wissman; Dennis Forsman	3:09.42	
	3	Poland	Michał Pietrzak; Rafał Omelko; Łukasz Domagała; Grzegorz Sobiński	DSQ	R 163.2

== Controversy ==
Originally, the British men's 4 × 400 m quartet of Michael Bingham, Richard Buck, Levine and Richard Strachan finished the race first, followed by Russian and Polish Team, but their victory was questioned by the judges because during his change, Richard Buck had crossed the line streets and stepped off the track. The British team was disqualified, but the members of British Athletic Federation appealed this decision by accusing Rafal Omelko (Polish athlete) of pushing Buck out of his line.

The British team was eventually reinstated as victors; the Polish squad of Michał Pietrzak, Rafal Omelko, Łukasz Domagała and Grzegorz Sobinskilost lost their third-place finish.
