= Nick Ekelund-Arenander =

Danish-Swedish sprinter

Nick Michael Ekelund-Arenander (born 23 January 1989 in Södermalm, Sweden) is a Danish/Swedish sprinter specialising in the 400 metres. He represented Denmark at the 2013 World Championships reaching the semifinals.

His personal bests in the event are 45.50 seconds outdoors (Madrid 2013) and 46.31 seconds indoors (Stockholm 2014).

== Competition record ==
Year	Competition	Venue	Position	Event	Notes
Representing Denmark
2009	European U23 Championships	Kaunas, Lithuania	10th (h)	4 × 400 m relay	3:17.15
2011	European Indoor Championships	Paris, France	23rd (h)	400 m	48.55
2011	European U23 Championships	Ostrava, Czech Republic	8th (sf)	400 m	46.86
2012	European Championships	Helsinki, Finland	14th (sf)	400 m	46.57
2013	European Indoor Championships	Gothenburg, Sweden	10th (sf)	400 m	47.33
2013	World Championships	Moscow, Russia	18th (sf)	400 m	45.89
2014	World Indoor Championships	Sopot, Poland	11th (h)	400 m	46.68
2014	European Championships	Zürich, Switzerland	23rd (sf)	400 m	47.16
2014	European Championships	Zürich, Switzerland	14th (h)	4 × 400 m relay	3:08.12
2015	European Indoor Championships	Prague, Czech Republic	22nd (h)	400 m	47.69
2015	Universiade	Gwangju, South Korea	8th	400 m	46.53
2015	Universiade	Gwangju, South Korea	11th (h)	4 × 400 m relay	3:13.14
Representing Sweden
2022	World Indoor Championships	Belgrade, Serbia	9th (h)	4 × 400 m relay	3:09.48
