= Juan Lewis =

Bahamian sprinter (born 1989)

Personal information
- Born: September 18, 1989 (age 36)
Medal record
Athletics
Representing Bahamas
CAC Junior Championships (U20)
Bronze medal – third place	2006 Port of Spain	4 × 400 m relay
CARIFTA Games Junior (U20)
Silver medal – second place	2006 Les Abymes	4 × 400 m relay
Bronze medal – third place	2007 Providenciales	4 × 400 m relay
CARIFTA Games Youth (U17)
Silver medal – second place	2005 Bacolet, Tobago	400 m
Bronze medal – third place	2005 Bacolet, Tobago	4 × 400 m relay

Juan Lewis (born September 18, 1989) is a male track and field athlete from West End, Grand Bahama in The Bahamas, who mainly competes in the 400 m and 200 He attended Bishop Michael Eldon School and Sunland Baptist Academy before competing for Southwestern Christian College and the UT Arlington Mavericks. Lewis ran the third leg of the 4 × 400 Relay at the 2010 IAAF World Indoor Championships in Doha, Qatar.

Lewis won a silver medal in the under 17 Boys 400 m at the 2005 CARIFTA Games in Tobago. He won a silver medal at the 2006 CARIFTA Games in Guadeloupe running the second leg of the 4 × 400 m Relay.

== Personal bests ==
Event	Time	Venue	Date
200 m	21.20 (+2.0)	Natchitoches, Louisiana	16 APR 2011
400 m	46.78	Nassau, Bahamas	27 JUN 2008
400 m (Indoor)	47.68	College Station, Texas	15 JAN 2011

== Achievements ==
Year	Competition	Venue	Position	Event	Notes
Representing Bahamas
2005	CARIFTA Games (U-17)	Bacolet, Trinidad and Tobago	2nd	400 m	49.40
2006	CARIFTA Games (U-20)	Les Abymes, Guadeloupe	8th	400 m	50.86
2006	CARIFTA Games (U-20)	Les Abymes, Guadeloupe	2nd	4 × 400 m relay	3:08.56
2006	Central American and Caribbean Junior Championships (U-20)	Port of Spain, Trinidad and Tobago	3rd (h)	200 m	22.10 (0.1 m/s)
2006	Central American and Caribbean Junior Championships (U-20)	Port of Spain, Trinidad and Tobago	3rd	4 × 400 m relay	3:09.09
2006	World Junior Championships	Beijing, China	—	400 m	DQ
2006	World Junior Championships	Beijing, China	13th (h)	4 × 400 m relay	3:10.71
2008	World Junior Championships	Bydgoszcz, Poland	22nd (sf)	400 m	48.30
2008	World Junior Championships	Bydgoszcz, Poland	7th	4 × 400 m relay	3:21.75
