= Vladimir Krasnov =

Russian sprinter (born 1990)

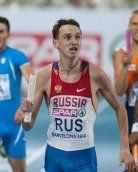
- Vladimir Krasnov at the 2010 European Championships

Personal information
- Born: 19 August 1990 (age 35) Bratsk, Russia
- Height: 1.90 m (6 ft 3 in)
- Weight: 70 kg (150 lb)

Sport
- Country: Russia
- Sport: Athletics
- Event(s): 400 metres 4 × 400 m Relay
Medal record
Men's athletics
Representing Russia
World Championships
Disqualified	2013 Moscow	4 × 400 m relay
European Championships
Gold medal – first place	2010 Barcelona	4 × 400 m relay
Disqualified	2014 Zürich	4 × 400 m relay
European Indoor Championships
Silver medal – second place	2013 Gothenburg	4 × 400 m relay
World Youth Championships
Bronze medal – third place	2007 Ostrava	400 m
Universiade
Gold medal – first place	2013 Kazan	400 m

Vladimir Aleksandrovich Krasnov (Russian: Владимир Александрович Краснов; born 19 August 1990) is a Russian track and field sprinter.

== International competitions ==
Year	Competition	Venue	Position	Event	Notes
Representing Russia
2007	World Youth Championships	Ostrava, Czech Republic	3rd	400 m	47.03
2007	European Youth Olympics	Belgrade, Serbia	1st	400 m	47.11
2008	World Junior Championships	Bydgoszcz, Poland	12th (sf)	400 m	47.38
2010	European Team Championships	Bergen, Norway	3rd	400 m	45.74
2010	European Team Championships	Bergen, Norway	1st	4 × 400 m relay	3:01.72
2010	European Championships	Barcelona, Spain	4th	400 m	45.24
2010	European Championships	Barcelona, Spain	1st	4 × 400 m relay	3:02.14
2011	European U23 Championships	Ostrava, Czech Republic	4th	400 m	46.29
2011	European U23 Championships	Ostrava, Czech Republic	3rd	4 × 400 m relay	3:04.01
2013	European Indoor Championships	Gothenburg, Sweden	2nd	4 × 400 m relay	3:06.96
2013	Universiade	Kazan, Russia	1st	400 m	45.49
2013	Universiade	Kazan, Russia	1st	4 × 400 m relay	3:03.70
2013	World Championships	Moscow, Russia	25th (h)	400 m	46.23
2013	World Championships	Moscow, Russia	DQ	4 × 400 m relay	2:59.90
2014	World Indoor Championships	Sopot, Poland	5th	4 × 400 m relay	3:07.12
2014	European Championships	Zürich, Switzerland	DQ	4 × 400 m relay	2:59.38

== See also ==
- List of stripped European Athletics Championships medals
