= Nigel Levine =

British sprinter (born 1989)

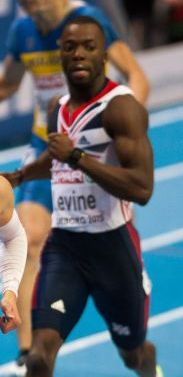
- Nigel Levine at the 2013 European Indoor Championships

Personal information
- Born: 30 April 1989 (age 37) San Fernando, Trinidad and Tobago
- Height: 1.78 m (5 ft 10 in)
- Weight: 68 kg (150 lb)

Sport
- Sport: Athletics
- Events: 400 metres 4 × 400 m Relay
- Club: Windsor, Slough, Eton and Hounslow AC

Achievements and titles
- Personal best: 400 metres 45.11 (Oslo 2012) 100 metres 10.38 (Mesa, AZ 2012) 200 metres 20.93i Birmingham 2012)
Medal record
European Championships
Gold medal – first place	2014 Zürich	4 × 400 m relay
Silver medal – second place	2012 Helsinki	4 × 400 m relay
World Indoor Championships
Silver medal – second place	2012 Istanbul	4 × 400 m relay
Silver medal – second place	2014 Sopot	4 × 400 m relay
Bronze medal – third place	2010 Doha	4 × 400 m relay
European Indoor Championships
Gold medal – first place	2013 Gothenburg	4 × 400 m relay
Silver medal – second place	2009 Turin	4 × 400 m relay
Silver medal – second place	2011 Paris	4 × 400 m relay
Silver medal – second place	2013 Gothenburg	400 m

Nigel Levine (born 30 April 1989) is a retired British sprint track and field athlete.

== Biography ==
Levine made a significant impact in his first season over 400 m in 2007 recording 46.31 and in 2009 reduced that to 45.78. In 2010 he was part of the bronze medal GB 4 × 400 m team at the world indoor championships in Doha and in 2011 also won the European U23 crown as well as being part of the GB 4 × 400 m relay squad.

In 2013, he won an individual silver medal 2013 European Indoor Championships in Gothenburg in the 400 metres, as well as helping the relay team to a gold medal.

Additionally in 2013, Levine became the British 400 metres champion after winning the 2013 British Athletics Championships.

Levine served a four-year ban from ran from December 2017 to December 2021 for an anti-doping rule violation after testing positive for clenbuterol.

On 17 January 2017, Levine was injured in a road accident alongside fellow sprinter James Ellington; the pair "were riding a motorbike when they were struck head on by a car travelling on the wrong side of the road". They were in Tenerife, Spain, undertaking warm-weather training with a group of British sprinters. Both athletes were admitted to hospital and were described on 18 January as "conscious and stable".

== International competitions ==
Year	Competition	Venue	Position	Event	Notes
Representing Great Britain
2007	European Junior Championships	Hengelo, Netherlands	1st	4 × 400 m relay	3:08.21
2008	World Junior Championships	Bydgoszcz, Poland	9th (sf)	400 m	47.14
2008	World Junior Championships	Bydgoszcz, Poland	2nd	4 × 400 m relay	3:05.82
2009	European Indoor Championships	Turin, Italy	2nd	4 × 400 m relay	3:07.04
2009	European U23 Championships	Kaunas, Lithuania	2nd	400 m	45.78
2009	European U23 Championships	Kaunas, Lithuania	6th	4 × 400 m relay	3:06.18
2010	World Indoor Championships	Doha, Qatar	3rd	4 × 400 m relay	3:07.52
2011	European Indoor Championships	Paris, France	4th (sf)	400 m	47.17
2011	European Indoor Championships	Paris, France	2nd	4 × 400 m relay	3:06.46
2011	European U23 Championships	Ostrava, Czech Republic	1st	400 m	46.10
2011	European U23 Championships	Ostrava, Czech Republic	1st	4 × 400 m relay	3:03.53
2011	World Championships	Daegu, South Korea	7th	4 × 400 m relay	3:01.16
2012	World Indoor Championships	Istanbul, Turkey	6th (sf)	400 m	46.46
2012	World Indoor Championships	Istanbul, Turkey	2nd	4 × 400 m relay	3:04.72
2012	European Championships	Helsinki, Finland	2nd	4 × 400 m relay	3:01.56
2013	European Indoor Championships	Gothenburg, Sweden	2nd	400 m	46.21
2013	European Indoor Championships	Gothenburg, Sweden	1st	4 × 400 m relay	3:05.78
2013	European Team Championships	Gateshead, UK	2nd	400 m	45.88
