= Lesyani Mayor =

Cuban high jumper

Lesyaní Mayor
Personal information
- Full name: Lesyaní Mayor Gil
- Born: 8 July 1989 (age 37) Camagüey, Cuba

Sport
- Country: Cuba
- Sport: Athletics
Medal record
Women's athletics
Representing Cuba
Pan American Games
| Gold medal – first place | 2011 Guadalajara | High jump |
CAC Championships
| Bronze medal – third place | 2009 Havana | High jump |
World Junior Championships
| Bronze medal – third place | 2008 Bydgoszcz | High jump |
- Updated on 7 January 2015

Lesyani Mayor Gil (born 8 July 1989) is a Cuban track and field athlete who competes in the high jump. Her personal best for the event is 1.93 metres, set in 2010. She was a World Junior bronze medallist in 2008 and won a senior bronze at the Central American and Caribbean Championships in Athletics a year later. Mayor was the gold medallist in the high jump at the 2011 Pan American Games.

== Biography ==
Born in Camagüey, Mayor began taking part in sports at an early age and competed in the pentathlon for her region in 2000. She started establishing herself at national level in the high jump in 2006 when she came third at the national championships and won at the Barrientos Memorial meeting.

She cleared 1.80 m for the first time the following year and made her first appearance abroad, placing fourth at the 2007 ALBA Games in Caracas, Venezuela. She won at the Barrientos meet and went on to achieve a personal best jump of 1.85 m at the 2007 Pan American Junior Athletics Championship to win the gold medal ahead of American Patience Coleman. The 2008 World Junior Championships in Athletics saw her win her first global level medal as she jumped a new best of 1.86 m in Bydgoszcz to take the bronze medal.

Mayor improved her best to 1.89 m in February in Havana and kept her good form at the 2009 ALBA Games, where she won the high jump gold medal. The 2009 Central American and Caribbean Championships in Athletics in Havana saw her make her senior debut at a top level event and she finished with the bronze medal while St. Lucia's Levern Spencer won the title. She began 2011 with a series of victories in Cuba, including a new best jump of 1.93 m and wins at the Barrientos and Cuban Championship meets. She won the silver medal at the 2010 Ibero-American Championships in Athletics in Spain and then came fourth at the Memorial Primo Nebiolo meet – her first outing on the European professional circuit. She won the Cuba Cup meet in Havana in July and was selected to represent the Americas team at the 2010 IAAF Continental Cup, where she finished in sixth place.

Mayor's 2011 season started with European indoor meetings and she had indoor best jumps of 1.84 m in both Naples and Weinheim. She won the national title at the Copa Cuba meet in March then had another win at the Barrientos Memorial in May. She was chosen to represent Cuba at the 2011 Pan American Games in Guadalajara. There she had a three-way tie with Marielys Rojas and defending champion Romary Rifka as all the athletes cleared 1.89 m. This resulted in a jump-off duel for the medals and Mayor came out on top.

== Personal bests ==
Outdoor

- High jump: 1.93 m – Havana, Cuba, 11 February 2010

Indoor

- High jump: 1.84 m – Naples, Italy, 5 February 2011

== Achievements ==
| Year | Competition | Venue | Position | Event | Notes |
Representing Cuba
| 2007 | ALBA Games | Caracas, Venezuela | 4th | High jump | 1.79 m |
| 2007 | Pan American Junior Championships | São Paulo, Brazil | 1st | High jump | 1.85 m |
| 2008 | World Junior Championships | Bydgoszcz, Poland | 3rd | High jump | 1.86 m |
| 2009 | ALBA Games | Havana, Cuba | 1st | High jump | 1.84 m |
| 2009 | Central American and Caribbean Championships | Havana, Cuba | 3rd | High jump | 1.76 m |
| 2010 | Ibero-American Championships | San Fernando, Spain | 2nd | High jump | 1.86 m |
| 2010 | Continental Cup | Split, Croatia | 6th | High jump | 1.78 m |
| 2011 | Pan American Games | Guadalajara, Mexico | 1st | High jump | 1.89 m A |
| 2012 | Olympic Games | London, United Kingdom | 20th (q) | High jump | 1.85 m |
| 2014 | Central American and Caribbean Games | Xalapa, Mexico | 5th | High jump | 1.75 m A |
