= 2011 European Athletics U23 Championships – Men's 400 metres =

The Men's 400 metres event at the 2011 European Athletics U23 Championships was held in Ostrava, Czech Republic, at Městský stadion on 14 and 16 July.

== Medalists ==
Gold	Nigel Levine; United Kingdom
Silver	Brian Gregan; Ireland
Bronze	Luke Lennon-Ford; United Kingdom

== Results ==
=== Final ===
16 July 2011 / 16:40

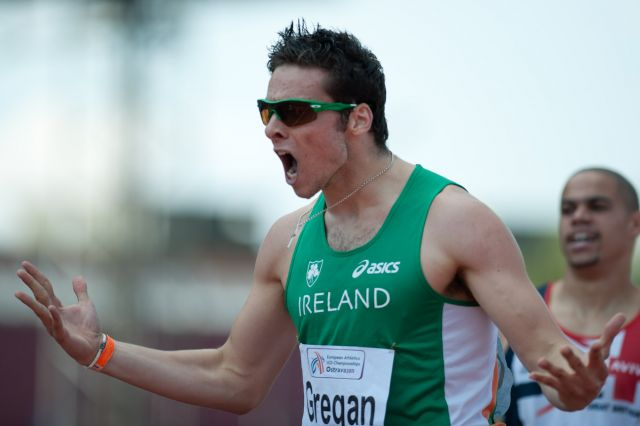
Silver medalist, Brian Gregan

Rank	Name	Nationality	Lane	Reaction Time	Time	Notes
1st place, gold medalist(s)	Nigel Levine	United Kingdom	6	0.174	46.10	
2nd place, silver medalist(s)	Brian Gregan	Ireland	5	0.172	46.12	PB
3rd place, bronze medalist(s)	Luke Lennon-Ford	United Kingdom	4	0.190	46.22	
4	Vladimir Krasnov	Russia	3	0.226	46.29	SB
5	Mame-Ibra Anne	France	1	0.224	46.32	PB
6	Mateusz Fórmański	Poland	8	0.160	46.33	
7	Yevhen Hutsol	Ukraine	2	0.161	46.56	PB
8	Vitaliy Butrym	Ukraine	7	0.194	46.96	

=== Heats ===
Qualified: First 2 in each heat (Q) and 2 best performers (q) advance to the Final

==== Summary ====
Rank	Name	Nationality	Time	Notes
1	Nigel Levine	United Kingdom	46.22	Q
2	Vladimir Krasnov	Russia	46.25	Q SB
3	Brian Gregan	Ireland	46.32	Q SB
4	Mame-Ibra Anne	France	46.37	q
5	Mateusz Fórmański	Poland	46.58	Q
6	Luke Lennon-Ford	United Kingdom	46.60	Q
7	Yevhen Hutsol	Ukraine	46.83	q PB
8	Nick Ekelund-Arenander	Denmark	46.86	PB
9	Bjorn Blauwhof	Netherlands	46.86	
10	Angel Chelala	France	46.88	
11	Mehmet Güzel	Turkey	47.19	
12	Vitaliy Butrym	Ukraine	47.25	Q
13	Łukasz Krawczuk	Poland	47.26	
14	Francesco Cappellin	Italy	47.29	
15	Marc Orozco	Spain	47.54	
16	Jonathan Vilaine	France	47.61	
17	Máté Lukács	Hungary	47.64	
18	Hakim Ibrahimov	Azerbaijan	47.83	
19	Javier Sanz	Spain	47.91	
19	Endrik Zilbershtein	Georgia	47.91	
21	Domenico Fontana	Italy	48.04	

==== Details ====
===== Heat 1 =====
14 July 2011 / 19:10

Rank	Name	Nationality	Lane	Reaction Time	Time	Notes
1	Luke Lennon-Ford	United Kingdom	6	0.198	46.60	Q
2	Vitaliy Butrym	Ukraine	2	0.221	47.25	Q
3	Łukasz Krawczuk	Poland	4	0.191	47.26	
4	Jonathan Vilaine	France	3	0.188	47.61	
5	Hakim Ibrahimov	Azerbaijan	8	0.196	47.83	
6	Javier Sanz	Spain	7	0.186	47.91	
7	Domenico Fontana	Italy	5	0.210	48.04	

===== Heat 2 =====
14 July 2011 / 19:17

Rank	Name	Nationality	Lane	Reaction Time	Time	Notes
1	Nigel Levine	United Kingdom	6	0.242	46.22	Q
2	Brian Gregan	Ireland	4	0.181	46.32	Q SB
3	Mame-Ibra Anne	France	3	0.239	46.37	q
4	Nick Ekelund-Arenander	Denmark	7	0.189	46.86	PB
5	Bjorn Blauwhof	Netherlands	5	0.228	46.86	
6	Marc Orozco	Spain	8	0.140	47.54	
7	Endrik Zilbershtein	Georgia	2	0.199	47.91	

===== Heat 3 =====
14 July 2011 / 19:24

Rank	Name	Nationality	Lane	Reaction Time	Time	Notes
1	Vladimir Krasnov	Russia	3	0.226	46.25	Q SB
2	Mateusz Fórmański	Poland	4	0.172	46.58	Q
3	Yevhen Hutsol	Ukraine	8	0.174	46.83	q PB
4	Angel Chelala	France	6	0.198	46.88	
5	Mehmet Güzel	Turkey	2	0.212	47.19	
6	Francesco Cappellin	Italy	5	0.181	47.29	
7	Máté Lukács	Hungary	7	0.204	47.64	

== Participation ==
According to an unofficial count, 21 athletes from 14 countries participated in the event.

- Azerbaijan (1)
- Denmark (1)
- Spain (2)
- France (3)
- United Kingdom (2)
- Georgia (1)
- Hungary (1)
- Ireland (1)
- Italy (2)
- Netherlands (1)
- Poland (2)
- Russia (1)
- Turkey (1)
- Ukraine (2)
