= Yuriy Trambovetskiy =

Russian athlete (born 1987)

Personal information
- Born: June 27, 1987 (age 39)

Sport
- Country: Russia
- Sport: Athletics
Medal record
Silver medal – second place	2013 Gothenburg	4 x 400 m relay

Yuriy Trambovetskiy (born June 27, 1987) is a Russian athlete.

== Achievements ==
Year	Competition	Position	Event	Notes
2013	European Athletics Indoor Championships	2nd	Men's 4 x 400 metres relay	3:06.96
