= Pavel Trenikhin =

Russian sprinter

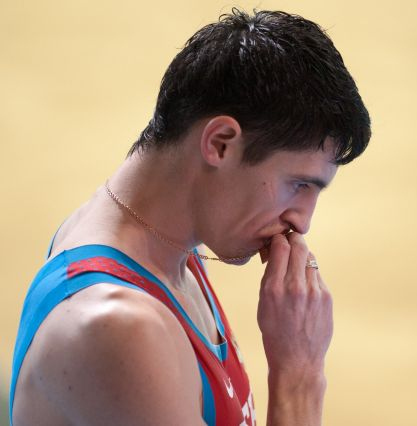
- Trenikhin in 2013

Personal information
- Native name: Павел Александрович Тренихин
- Full name: Pavel Aleksandrovich Trenikhin
- Born: 24 March 1986 (age 40) Serov, Russia
- Height: 1.94 m (6 ft 4 in)
- Weight: 84 kg (185 lb)

Sport
- Country: Russia
- Sport: Athletics
- Event(s): 400 metres 4 × 400 metres relay
Medal record
European Championships
Gold medal – first place	2010 Barcelona	4 × 400 m relay
European Indoor Championships
Silver medal – second place	2013 Gothenburg	4 × 400 m relay
Bronze medal – third place	2013 Gothenburg	400 m

Pavel Aleksandrovich Trenikhin (Russian: Павел Александрович Тренихин; born 24 March 1986) is a Russian sprint athlete. He was born in Serov.

== International competitions ==
Year	Competition	Venue	Position	Event	Notes
2010	European Team Championships	Bergen, Norway	1st	4 × 400 m relay	3:01.72
2010	European Championships	Barcelona, Spain	1st	4 × 400 m relay	3:02.14
2013	European Indoor Championships	Gothenburg, Sweden	3rd	400m	46.70
2013	European Indoor Championships	Gothenburg, Sweden	2nd	4 × 400 m relay	3:06.96
2015	World Championships	Beijing, China	8th	4 × 400 m relay	3:03.05
