= Athletics at the 2011 Pan American Games – Women's high jump =

Women's high jump at the 2011 Pan American Games
- Venue: Telmex Athletics Stadium
- Dates: October 26
- Competitors: 10 from 9 nations

Medalists
Gold medal	Lesyani Mayor	Cuba
Silver medal	Marielys Rojas	Venezuela
Bronze medal	Romary Rifka	Mexico

The women's high jump competition at the 2011 Pan American Games in Guadalajara was held on October 24 at the newly built Telmex Athletics Stadium. The defending Pan American Games champion is Romary Rifka of the Mexico.

== Records ==
Prior to this competition, the existing world and Pan American Games records were as follows:

World record	Stefka Kostadinova (BUL)	2.09	Rome, Italy	August 30, 1987
Pan American Games record	Coleen Sommer (USA)	1.96	Indianapolis, United States	August 13, 1987

== Qualification ==
Each National Olympic Committee (NOC) was able to enter up to two entrants providing they had met the minimum standard (1.76) in the qualifying period (January 1, 2010 to September 14, 2011).

== Schedule ==
Date	Time	Round
October 26, 2011	16:00	Final

== Results ==
All distances shown are in meters:centimeters

KEY:	q	Fastest non-qualifiers	Q	Qualified	NR	National record	PB	Personal best	SB	Seasonal best

=== Final ===
The final was held on October 26.

Rank	Athlete	Nationality	1.60	1.65	1.70	1.75	1.78	1.81	1.84	1.87	1.89	1.91	1.89	Result	Notes
1st place, gold medalist(s)	Lesyani Mayor	Cuba	–	–	–	o	–	o	o	o	o	xxx	o	1.89	SB
2nd place, silver medalist(s)	Marielys Rojas	Venezuela	–	o	o	o	o	o	o	o	o	xxx	x	1.89	SB
3rd place, bronze medalist(s)	Romary Rifka	Mexico	–	–	o	o	o	o	xxo	xo	o	xxx		1.89	
4	Deirdre Mullen	United States	–	–	–	–	–	o	o	xxx				1.84	
5	Valdileia Martins	Brazil	–	–	–	o	o	o	xxo	xxx				1.84	
6	Fabiola Ayala	Mexico	–	–	o	o	o	xo	xxo	xxx				1.84	
7	Levern Spencer	Saint Lucia	–	–	–	–	–	o	x-	–	–	xx		1.81	
8	Kimberley Williamson	Jamaica	–	o	o	xo	xo	xxx						1.78	
9	Gabriela Saravia	Peru	o	o	xxx									1.65	
10	Jorgelina Rodríguez	Argentina	xo	xxo	xxx									1.65	
