= Richard Strachan (athlete) =

British sprinter

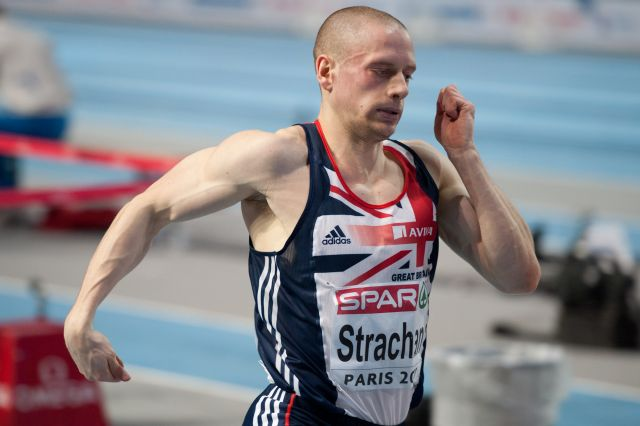
- Strachan at the 2011 European Athletics Indoor Championships.

Medal record

Men's athletics

Representing United Kingdom

European Indoor Championships
Gold medal – first place	2013 Gothenburg	4 × 400 m relay
Silver medal – second place	2011 Paris	4 × 400 m relay

Richard Strachan (born 18 November 1986) is a British personal trainer, former athlete who competed in sprinting. During his time in athletics, Strachan has represented Great Britain at World and European Championships, winning two European Golds and a European Silver medal. Strachan mainly specialized in the 400 metres distance as seen from his involvement in the British team during the European indoor championships on several occasions.

Following his departure from athletics, Strachan has become a strength coach, coaching YouTubers such as Vikkstar123, TBJZL, and Manny. Strachan owns a YouTube channel with 62,000 subscribers, posting both sprinting and strength training videos with the YouTubers.

== Amateur boxing record ==
1 fight	0 wins	1 loss
By decision	0	1

No.	Result	Record	Opponent	Type	Round, time	Date	Location	Notes
1	Loss	0–1	JMX	UD	4	25 Aug 2018	Manchester Arena, Manchester, England	
