= Kimberly Jess =

German high jumper

Personal information
- Born: 30 January 1992 (age 34) Rendsburg, Germany
- Height: 1.81 m (5 ft 11 in)

Sport
- Country: Germany
- Sport: Track and field
- Event: High jump
Medal record
Track and field
Representing Germany
World Junior Championships in Athletics
Gold medal – first place	2008 Bydgoszcz	Women's high jump

Kimberly Jess (born 30 January 1992) is a former German high jumper and occasionally participated in long jump events in international level events. She was a junior World champion in the 2008 World Junior Championships in Athletics in Bydgoszcz, Poland.
