= Natalya Mamlina =

Russian high jumper

Personal information
- Born: 16 March 1991 (age 35)

Sport
- Country: Russia
- Sport: Athletics
- Event: High jump

Achievements and titles
- Personal best: High jump: 1.91 m (2009)

Natalya Mamlina (born 16 March 1991) is a Russian female high jumper, who won an individual gold medal at the Youth World Championships.
