= O'Neal Wilder =

American sprinter (born 1989)

Personal information
- Nationality: United States
- Born: August 9, 1989 (age 36) Carthage, Mississippi, U.S.
- Height: 6 ft 4 1/2 in (1.94 m)
- Weight: 206 lb (93 kg)

Sport
- Sport: Running
- Event(s): 200 metres 400 metres

Achievements and titles
- Personal best(s): 200 m: 21.08 s (Starkville 2008); 400 m: 45.24 s (Knoxville 2010)
Medal record
Representing United States
Men's athletics
World Junior Championships
Gold medal – first place	2008 Bydgoszcz	4×400 m relay
Bronze medal – third place	2008 Bydgoszcz	400 m

Cranston O’Neal Wilder (born August 9, 1989) is an American sprinter who specializes in the 400 metres. He currently in his junior year at Mississippi State University.

At the 2008 World Junior Championships in Athletics held in Bydgoszcz, Poland, Wilder won a bronze medal in the 400 metres, and also helped the U.S. squad to a gold medal in the 4×400 metres relay.

== Personal best ==
Distance	Time	venue
200 m	21.08 s	Starkville, United States (March 29, 2008)
400 m	45.24 s	Knoxville, United States (May 16, 2010)
