= Marcus Boyd =

American sprinter (born 1989)

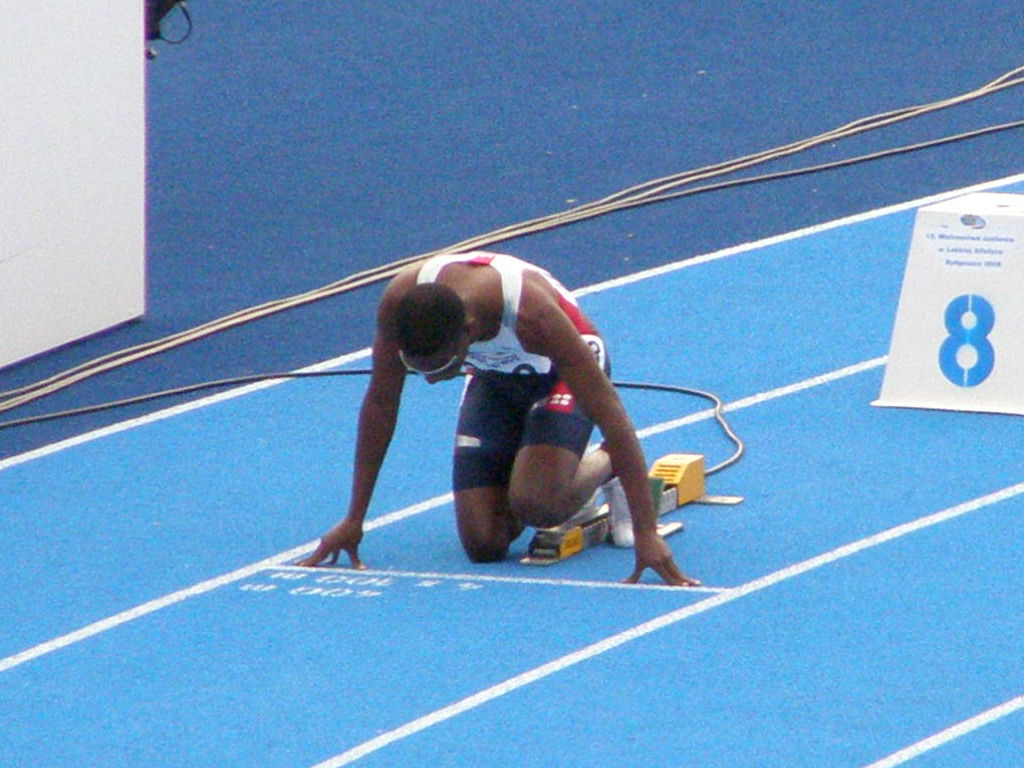
- Bydgoszcz 2008 - Marcus Boyd

Personal information
- Nationality: United States
- Born: March 3, 1989 (age 37) Fort Worth, Texas, U.S.
- Height: 6 ft 1 in (1.85 m)

Sport
- Sport: Running
- Event: 400 metres

Achievements and titles
- Personal best(s): 200m: 21.18 s (Houston 2006); 400m: 45.53 s (Bydgoszcz 2008)
Medal record
Men's athletics
Representing United States
World Junior Championships
Gold medal – first place	2008 Bydgoszcz	400 m
Gold medal – first place	2008 Bydgoszcz	4×400 m relay

Marcus D. Boyd (born March 3, 1989) is an American sprinter, who specialises in the 400 meters. He ran for Baylor University.

== Personal best ==
Distance	Time	venue
200 m	21.18 s	Houston, Texas (7 July 2006)
400 m	45.53 s	Bydgoszcz, Poland (10 July 2008)
