= Bryan Miller (athlete) =

American sprinter (born 1989)

Bryan Keith Miller II

Personal information
- Born: May 31, 1989 (age 37) Houston, Texas, U.S.
- Education: [Texas A&M University]
- Height: 1.74 m (5 ft 9 in)
- Weight: 70 kg (154 lb)
- Mother: Andrea Miller
- Website: https://bryankmiller.com/

Sport
- Country: United States
- Sport: Track and field, Road running, Long-distance running, HYROX
- Events: 400 m, 200 m, 800 m, Mile, 5K
- College team: Texas A&M

Achievements and titles
- Personal bests: 400 m (outdoor): 45.29 (2011); 400 m (indoor): 46.34 (2011); Mile (outdoor): 4:49.72 (2026); 5 km (road): 17:39 (2026)
Medal record
Men's athletics
Representing United States
World Junior Championships
Gold medal – first place	2008 Bydgoszcz	4×400 m relay

Bryan Keith Miller II (born May 31, 1989) is an American athlete who specializes in the 400m. He is an 11 time All-American for Texas A&M University.

== Personal life and education ==
Miller was born on May 31, 1989, in Houston, Texas. and attended Episcopal High School from 2003 to 2007. He started running track at the age of 11 in 2001 from the Track Houston track club. He personal best in high school were 10.70 (100m), 21.25 (200m) 47.02 (400m) and 1:55.25 (800m).

Bryan currently resides in Houston, Texas as a Real estate agent and Property Manager.

== Running career ==
=== Collegiate ===
He chose Texas A&M University in College Station, Texas. over other schools that could offer athletic scholarships. At Texas A&M, an NCAA Division I school, Miller earned a degree in Sports management in 2012. At Texas A&M, Recorded second fastest time on team when he set a personal best of 45.85 for fourth place at Big 12 Championships ... Finished third in 400 (46.32) at US Juniors ... Ran second leg (46.7) of United States team that won gold in 4 x 400 (3:03.86) at World Juniors in Poland. In 2009, Miller ran a 44.7-second split on the second leg of the 4 × 400 m relay, helping his team secure a second-place finish. Millers collegiate best in the 400m (45.29)and (46.34) indoors.

== Personal Records ==
- 100m Outdoors - 10.70 (2007)
- 200m Outdoors - 21.03 (2010)
- 200m Indoors - 21.25 (2011)
- 400m Outdoors - 45.29. (2011)
- 400m Indoors - 46.34 (2011)
- 800m Outdoors - 1:55.25 (2006)
- 1 Mile Outdoors - 4:49.72 (2026)
- 5k Outdoors - 17:39 (2026)
- 10k Outdoors - 38.00 (2026)
- Marathon - 3:04.23 (2026)
- 4x400m Outdoors - 3:00.45 (2011)
