= 2013 European Athletics Indoor Championships =

- Edition: 32nd
- Dates: 1–3 March
- Host city: Gothenburg, Sweden
- Venue: Scandinavium
- Events: 26
- Participation: 578 athletes from 47 nations

The 2013 European Athletics Indoor Championships were held at Scandinavium and Svenska Mässan in Gothenburg, Sweden, on 1–3 March 2013.

== Bidding process ==
The decision to grant the event for Gothenburg was made by the European Athletics Council at their long meeting in Malta on October 15, 2007. Initially, Gothenburg applied for the 2011 Championships against Paris. The European Athletic Association thought the two cities presented very good concepts, and it ended up with the two candidates get one championship each; Paris in 2011 and Gothenburg in 2013. Gothenburg used the concept All under one roof.

== Venue ==
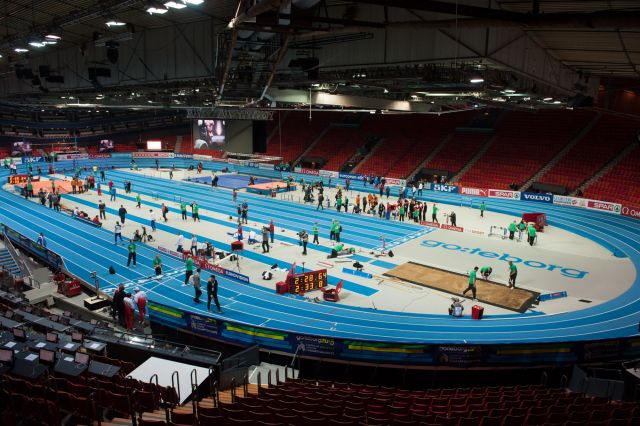
Scandinavium

The main venue for the 2013 European Athletics Indoor Championships will be Scandinavium with a maximum capacity of 12,000 spectators, but at the event the arena will have about 6,500 spectators because of the reconstruction. Prior to the championships, the arena floor was raised 3 metres and equipped with running tracks. In Svenska Mässan, next to Scandinavium, there was a Market Square, where various activities were organized during the competitions. All the victory ceremonies took place in the Market Square during the evenings. The shot put qualifications was also held at a special shot put venue in Svenska Mässan. The host city Gothenburg organized several championships in athletics before. In 1974 and 1984, Scandinavium hosted the European Indoor Championships. Moreover, nearby Ullevi Stadium staged the 1995 World Championships in Athletics and the 2006 European Athletics Championships. Last time Sweden hosted the European Indoor Championships was in 1996 when Ericsson Globe in Stockholm held the event.

== Men's results ==
=== Track ===
Event	Gold		Silver		Bronze	
60 metres	Jimmy Vicaut; France	6.48; WL	James Dasaolu; Great Britain	6.48; WL	Michael Tumi; Italy	6.52
400 metres*	Pavel Maslák; Czech Republic	45.66; EL, NR	Nigel Levine; Great Britain	46.21; SB	Pavel Trenikhin; Russia	46.70
800 metres	Adam Kszczot; Poland	1:48.69	Kevin López; Spain	1:49.31	Mukhtar Mohammed; Great Britain	1:49.60
1500 metres	Mahiedine Mekhissi-Benabbad; France	3:37.17	İlham Tanui Özbilen; Turkey	3:37.22; SB	Simon Denissel; France	3:37.70; PB
3000 metres	Hayle Ibrahimov; Azerbaijan	7:49.74	Juan Carlos Higuero; Spain	7:50.26	Ciarán Ó Lionáird; Ireland	7:50.40; PB
60 metres hurdles	Sergey Shubenkov; Russia	7.49; WL	Paolo Dal Molin; Italy	7.51; NR	Pascal Martinot-Lagarde; France	7.53 =PB
4 × 400 metres relay**	Great Britain; Michael Bingham; Richard Buck; Nigel Levine; Richard Strachan	3:05.78	Russia; Pavel Trenikhin; Yuriy Trambovetskiy; Konstantin Svechkar; Vladimir Krasnov	3:06.96	Czech Republic; Daniel Němeček; Josef Prorok; Petr Lichý; Pavel Maslák	3:07.64

* Pavel Trenikhin was originally disqualified, but was reinstated upon appeal. ** Great Britain were originally disqualified, but were reinstated upon appeal.

=== Field ===
Event	Gold		Silver		Bronze	
High jump	Sergey Mudrov; Russia	2.35; PB	Aleksey Dmitrik; Russia	2.33	Jaroslav Bába; Czech Republic	2.31; SB
Pole vault	Renaud Lavillenie; France	6.01; WL	Björn Otto; Germany	5.76	Malte Mohr; Germany	5.76
Long jump	Aleksandr Menkov; Russia	8.31; WL	Michel Tornéus; Sweden	8.29; NR	Christian Reif; Germany	8.07
Triple jump	Daniele Greco; Italy	17.70 m WL	Ruslan Samitov; Russia	17.30 m PB	Aleksey Fyodorov; Russia	17.12; PB
Shot put	Asmir Kolašinac; Serbia	20.62; SB	Hamza Alić; Bosnia and Herzegovina	20.34; PB	Ladislav Prášil; Czech Republic	20.29

=== Combined ===
Event	Gold		Silver		Bronze	
Heptathlon	Eelco Sintnicolaas; Netherlands	6372; WL, NR	Kevin Mayer; France	6297; PB	Mihail Dudaš; Serbia	6099; NR

== Women's results ==
=== Track ===
Event	Gold		Silver		Bronze	
60 metres	Mariya Ryemyen; Ukraine	7.10 =PB	Myriam Soumaré; France	7.11	Ivet Lalova; Bulgaria	7.12; PB
400 metres	Perri Shakes-Drayton; Great Britain	50.85; WL	Eilidh Child; Great Britain	51.45; PB	Moa Hjelmer; Sweden	52.04; NR
800 metres	Nataliya Lupu; Ukraine	2:00.26	Yelena Kotulskaya; Russia	2:00.98	Maryna Arzamasava; Belarus	2:01.21
1500 metres	Abeba Aregawi; Sweden	4:04.47	Isabel Macías; Spain	4:14.19	Katarzyna Broniatowska; Poland	4:14.30
3000 metres	Sara Moreira; Portugal	8:58.50	Corinna Harrer; Germany	9:00.50	Fionnuala Britton; Ireland	9:00.54
60 metres hurdles	Alina Talay; Belarus	7.94 =PB	Veronica Borsi; Italy	7.94; NR	Derval O'Rourke; Ireland	7.95; SB
4 × 400 metres relay	Great Britain; Eilidh Child; Shana Cox; Christine Ohuruogu; Perri Shakes-Drayton	3:27.56; WL, NR, CR	Russia; Olga Tovarnova; Tatyana Veshkurova; Nadezhda Kotlyarova; Kseniya Zadorina	3:28.18	Czech Republic; Denisa Rosolová; Jitka Bartonicková; Lenka Masná; Zuzana Hejnová	3:28.49

=== Field ===
Event	Gold		Silver		Bronze	
High jump	Ruth Beitia; Spain	1.99; SB	Ebba Jungmark; Sweden	1.96 =PB	Emma Green Tregaro; Sweden	1.96; SB
Pole vault	Holly Bleasdale; Great Britain	4.67	Anna Rogowska; Poland	4.67; SB	Anzhelika Sidorova; Russia	4.62; PB
Long jump	Darya Klishina; Russia	7.01; WL	Éloyse Lesueur; France	6.90; NR	Erica Jarder; Sweden	6.71; PB
Triple jump	Olha Saladuha; Ukraine	14.88; WL, NR	Irina Gumenyuk; Russia	14.30	Simona La Mantia; Italy	14.26; SB
Shot put	Christina Schwanitz; Germany	19.25	Alena Kopets; Belarus	18.85	Chiara Rosa; Italy	18.37; SB

=== Combined ===
Event	Gold		Silver		Bronze	
Pentathlon	Antoinette Nana Djimou; France	4666	Yana Maksimava; Belarus	4658; PB	Hanna Melnychenko; Ukraine	4604

== Medal table ==
Rank	Nation	Gold	Silver	Bronze	Total
1	Russia	4	6	3	13
2	France	4	3	2	9
3	Great Britain	4	3	1	8
4	Ukraine	3	0	1	4
5	Spain	1	3	0	4
6	Italy	1	2	3	6
6	Sweden	1	2	3	6
8	Germany	1	2	2	5
9	Belarus	1	2	1	4
10	Poland	1	1	1	3
11	Czech Republic	1	0	4	5
12	Serbia	1	0	1	2
13	Azerbaijan	1	0	0	1
13	Netherlands	1	0	0	1
13	Portugal	1	0	0	1
16	Bosnia and Herzegovina	0	1	0	1
16	Turkey	0	1	0	1
18	Ireland	0	0	3	3
19	Bulgaria	0	0	1	1
Totals (19 entries)		26	26	26	78

== Participating nations ==
A total of 577 athletes from 47 countries has participated in the championships.

- Albania (3)
- Andorra (1)
- Armenia (2)
- Austria (5)
- Azerbaijan (2)
- Belarus (12)
- Belgium (13)
- Bosnia and Herzegovina (2)
- Bulgaria (13)
- Croatia (8)
- Cyprus (4)
- Czech Republic (21)
- Denmark (6)
- Estonia (7)
- Finland (11)
- France (32)
- Georgia (3)
- Germany (28)
- Gibraltar (2)
- Great Britain and N. I. (29)
- Greece (12)
- Hungary (7)
- Iceland (2)
- Ireland (11)
- Israel (2)
- Italy (40)
- Latvia (10)
- Lithuania (4)
- Macedonia (1)
- Malta (1)
- Moldova (1)
- Monaco (1)
- Netherlands (13)
- Norway (12)
- Poland (21)
- Portugal (13)
- Romania (18)
- Russia (51)
- San Marino (1)
- Serbia (4)
- Slovakia (11)
- Slovenia (7)
- Spain (26)
- Sweden (40) (Host)
- Switzerland (6)
- Turkey (15)
- Ukraine (38)

In brackets: Squad size

== Broadcasting ==
TV4 in Sweden is the host broadcaster of the 2013 European Athletics Indoor Championships.

Territory	Rights holder
Croatia	HTV2
Denmark	DR3
Europe	Eurosport
Ireland	RTÉ
Latvia	LTV 7
Poland	TVP Sport
Romania	TVR2, TVR HD
Spain	Teledeporte
Sweden	TV4
Great Britain	BBC
