= 2008 World Junior Championships in Athletics =

International athletics competition

- Host city: Bydgoszcz, Poland
- Nations: 165
- Athletes: 1408
- Events: 44
- Dates: 8–13 July
- Main venue: Zdzisław Krzyszkowiak Stadium

The 2008 World Junior Championships in Athletics were the 2008 version of the World Junior Championships in Athletics. It was held in Bydgoszcz in Poland at the Zdzisław Krzyszkowiak Stadium between 8 and 13 July 2008. Previously Bydgoszcz hosted the 1999 World Youth Championships.

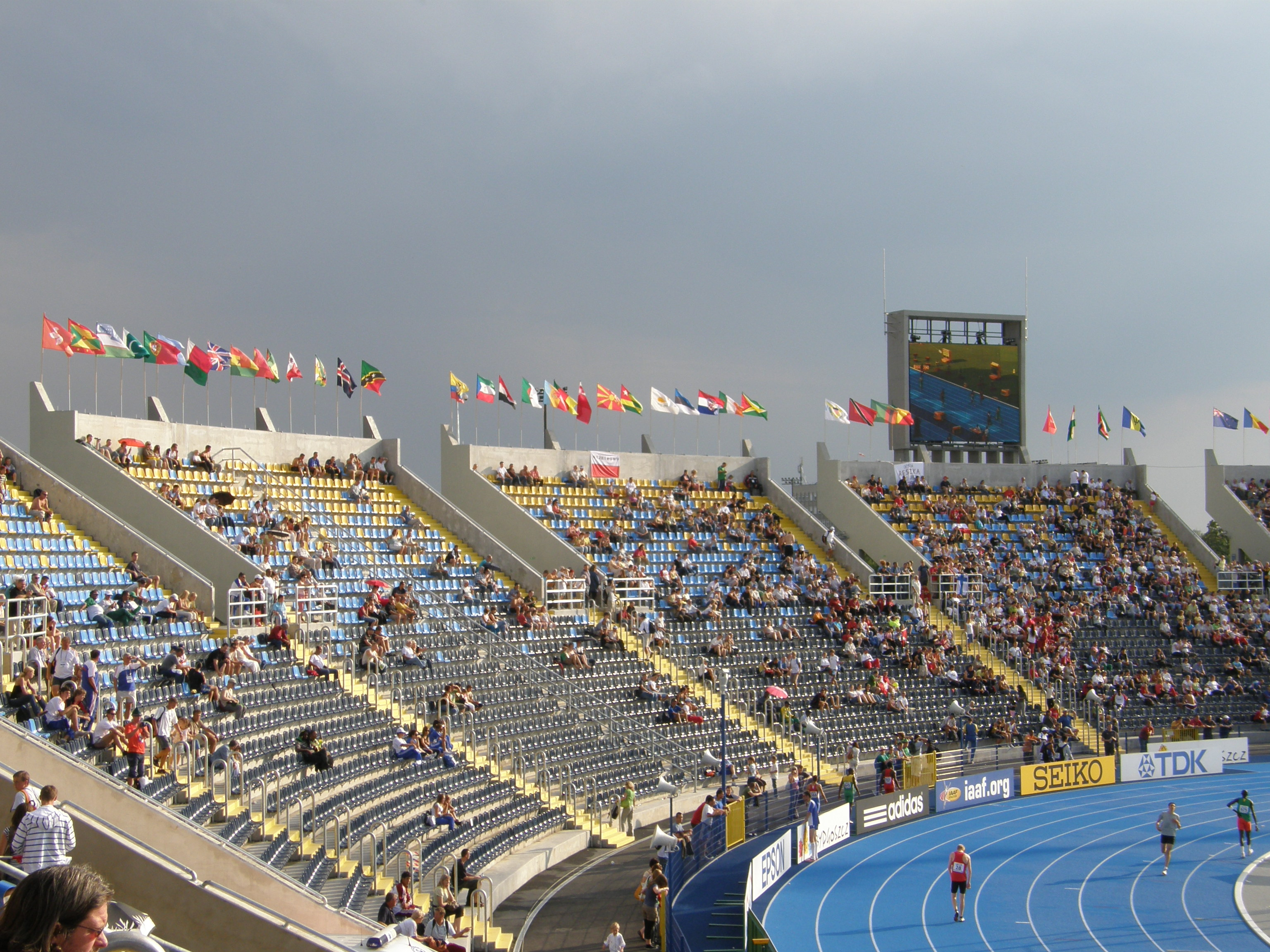
Zdzisław Krzyszkowiak Stadium, the host venue of the Championships.

The United States topped the medal table with 17 medals overall, including 11 golds, ahead of Germany and Kenya.

== Men's results ==
=== Track ===
Event	Gold		Silver		Bronze	
100 metres	Dexter Lee; Jamaica	10.40	Wilhelm van der Vyver; South Africa	10.42	Terrell Wilks; United States	10.45
200 metres	Christophe Lemaitre; France	20.83; PB	Nickel Ashmeade; Jamaica	20.84	Robert Hering; Germany	20.96
400 metres	Marcus Boyd; United States	45.53; WJL	Kirani James; Grenada	45.70; NJ	O'Neal Wilder; United States	45.76
800 metres	Abubaker Kaki; Sudan	1:45.60	Geoffrey Kibet; Kenya	1:46.23; PB	André Olivier; South Africa	1:47.57
1500 metres	Imad Touil; Algeria	3:47.40	James Kiplagat Magut; Kenya	3:47.51	Demma Daba; Ethiopia	3:47.65
5000 metres	Abreham Cherkos; Ethiopia	13:08.57; CR	Mathew Kipkoech Kisorio; Kenya	13:11.57; PB	Dejen Gebremeskel; Ethiopia	13:11.97
10,000 metres	Josphat Kipkoech Bett; Kenya	27:30.85; CR	Titus Kipjumba Mbishei; Kenya	27:31.65; PB	Ibrahim Jeilan; Ethiopia	28:07.98
110 metres hurdles 99.0 cm	Konstantin Shabanov; Russia	13.27; WJL	Booker Nunley; United States	13.45	Keiron Stewart; Jamaica	13.51
400 metres hurdles	Jeshua Anderson; United States	48.68; PB	Johnny Dutch; United States	49.25	Amaurys R. Valle; Cuba	49.56; NJ
3000 metres steeplechase	Jonathan Muia Ndiku; Kenya	8:17.28; PB	Benjamin Kiplagat; Uganda	8:19.24	Patrick Kipyegon Terer; Kenya	8:25.14; PB
4 × 100 metres relay	United States; Dante Sales; Antonio Sales; Marquise Goodwin; Terrell Wilks	38.98; WJL	Jamaica; Oshane Bailey; Dexter Lee; Nickel Ashmeade; Yohan Blake	39.25; SB	South Africa; Johannes Mosala; Roscoe Engel; Patrick Vosloo; Wilhelm van der Vyver	39.70
4 × 400 metres relay	United States; Marcus Boyd; Bryan Miller; O'Neal Wilder; Jeshua Anderson	3:03.86; WJL	Great Britain; Louis Persent; Robert Davis; Nigel Levine; Jordan McGrath	3:05.82; SB	Germany; Niklas Zender; Alexander Juretzko; Marc-John Dombrowski; Pascal Nabow	3:06.47; SB
10,000 metres walk	Stanislav Emelyanov; Russia	39:35.01; CR	Chen Ding; China	39:47.20; AJ	Lluís Torlá; Spain	40:29.57; PB
WR world record | AR area record | CR championship record | GR games record | NR national record | OR Olympic record | PB personal best | SB season best | WL world leading (in a given season)

=== Field ===
Event	Gold		Silver		Bronze	
High jump	Bohdan Bondarenko; Ukraine	2.26; WJL	Sylwester Bednarek; Poland	2.24; SB	Miguel Ángel Sancho; Spain	2.21
Pole vault	Raphael Holzdeppe; Germany	5.50	Paweł Wojciechowski; Poland	5.40; PB	Karsten Dilla; Germany	5.30
Long jump	Marquise Goodwin; United States	7.74; PB	Dzmitry Astrouski; Belarus	7.64	Eusebio Cáceres; Spain	7.59
Triple jump	Teddy Tamgho; France	17.33	Osviel Hernández; Cuba	16.90	Mohamed Yusuf Salman; Bahrain	16.59
Shot put 6 kg	David Storl; Germany	21.08; WJL	Aleksandr Bulanov; Russia	20.14	Marin Premeru; Croatia	19.93; PB
Discus throw 1.75 kg	Gordon Wolf; Germany	62.00; PB	Marin Premeru; Croatia	61.85	Mykyta Nesterenko; Ukraine	61.01
Hammer throw 6 kg	Walter Henning; United States	76.92; AJ	Conor McCullough; United States	75.88; PB	Aleh Dubitski; Belarus	75.42
Javelin throw	Robert Szpak; Poland	78.01; WJL	Ihab Al Sayed Abdelrahman; Egypt	76.20; NJ	Ansis Bruns; Latvia	75.31; PB
Decathlon Junior	Jan Felix Knobel; Germany	7896; WJL	Eduard Mikhan; Belarus	7894; NJ	Mihail Dudaš; Serbia	7663; NJ
WR world record | AR area record | CR championship record | GR games record | NR national record | OR Olympic record | PB personal best | SB season best | WL world leading (in a given season)

== Women's results ==
=== Track ===
Event	Gold		Silver		Bronze	
100 metres	Jeneba Tarmoh; United States	11.37	Ashleigh Nelson; Great Britain	11.49	Sheniqua Ferguson; Bahamas	11.52
200 metres	Sheniqua Ferguson; Bahamas	23.24	Meritzer Williams; Saint Kitts and Nevis	23.40	Janelle Redhead; Grenada	23.52
400 metres	Folashade Abugan; Nigeria	51.84	Jessica Beard; United States	52.09	Susana A. Clement; Cuba	52.36
800 metres	Elena Mirela Lavric; Romania	2:00.06; CR	Merve Aydin; Turkey	2:00.92; NJ	Machteld Anna Mulder; Netherlands	2:02.05; PB
1500 metres	Stephanie Twell; Great Britain	4:15.09	Kalkidan Gezahegne; Ethiopia	4:16.58	Emma Pallant; Great Britain	4:17.06
3000 metres	Mercy Cherono; Kenya	8:58.07; SB	Bizunesh Urgesa; Ethiopia	8:58.90	Frethiwat Goshu; Ethiopia	9:03.76; PB
5000 metres	Sule Utura; Ethiopia	16:15.59	Genzebe Dibaba; Ethiopia	16:16.75	Nelly Chebet; Kenya	16:17.96
100 metres hurdles	Teona Rodgers; United States	13.40	Shermaine Williams; Jamaica	13.48	Belkis Milanés; Cuba	13.49
400 metres hurdles	Takecia Jameson; United States	56.29; WJL	Janeil Bellille; Trinidad and Tobago	56.84; NJ	Meghan Beesley; Great Britain	57.08; PB
3000 metres steeplechase	Christine Kambua Muyanga; Kenya	9:31.35; CR	Elizabeth Mueni; Kenya	9:36.50; PB	Korahubish Itaa; Ethiopia	9:37.81; NJ
4 × 100 metres relay	United States; Jeneba Tarmoh; Shayla Mahan; Gabrielle Glenn; Tiffany Townsend	43.66; WJL	Jamaica; Shawna Anderson; Kaycea Jones; Gayon Evans; Jura Levy	43.98; SB	Brazil; Barbara de Oliveira; Bárbara Leôncio; Luana Correa; Rosângela Santos	44.61
4 × 400 metres relay	United States; Lanie Whittaker; Jessica Beard; Erica Alexander; Takecia Jameson	3:30.19	Ukraine; Olha Zemlyak; Yuliya Krasnoshchok; Hanna Yaroshchuk; Yuliya Baraley	3:34.20; NJ	Australia; Brittney McGlone; Trychelle Kingdom; Olivia Tauro; Angeline Blackburn	3:34.23; SB
10,000 metres walk	Tatyana Mineeva; Russia	43:24.72; CR	Elmira Alembekova; Russia	43:45.16; PB	Li Yanfei; China	44:24.10; PB
WR world record | AR area record | CR championship record | GR games record | NR national record | OR Olympic record | PB personal best | SB season best | WL world leading (in a given season)

=== Field ===
Event	Gold		Silver		Bronze	
High jump	Kimberly Jess; Germany	1.86	Mirela Demireva; Bulgaria	1.86; SB	Lesyani Mayor; Cuba; Hannelore Desmet; Belgium	1.86; PB; 1.86; PB
Pole vault	Valeriya Volik; Russia	4.40; CR	Ekaterina Kolesova; Russia	4.40; CR	Ekaterini Stefanidi; Greece	4.25; SB
Long jump	Ivana Španović; Serbia	6.61	Nastassia Mironchyk; Belarus	6.46	Dailenys Alcántara; Cuba	6.41; PB
Triple jump	Dailenys Alcántara; Cuba	14.25; WJL	Josleidy Ribalta; Cuba	13.85	Paraskevi Papahristou; Greece	13.74
Shot put	Natalia Ducó; Chile	17.23	Melissa Boekelman; Netherlands	16.60	Ma Qiao; China	16.55; SB
Discus throw	Shangxue Xi; China	54.96; SB	Julia Fischer; Germany	54.69	Sandra Perković; Croatia	54.24
Hammer throw	Bianca Perie; Romania	67.95; CR	Katerina Šafránková; Czech Republic	63.13	Jenny Ozorai; Hungary	60.80
Javelin throw	Vira Rebryk; Ukraine	63.01; WJ	Li Lingwei; China	59.25; PB	Tatjana Jelaca; Serbia	58.77; NR
Heptathlon	Carolin Schäfer; Germany	5833; PB	Yana Maksimava; Belarus	5766	Grit Šadeiko; Estonia	5765; PB
WR world record | AR area record | CR championship record | GR games record | NR national record | OR Olympic record | PB personal best | SB season best | WL world leading (in a given season)

== Medal table ==
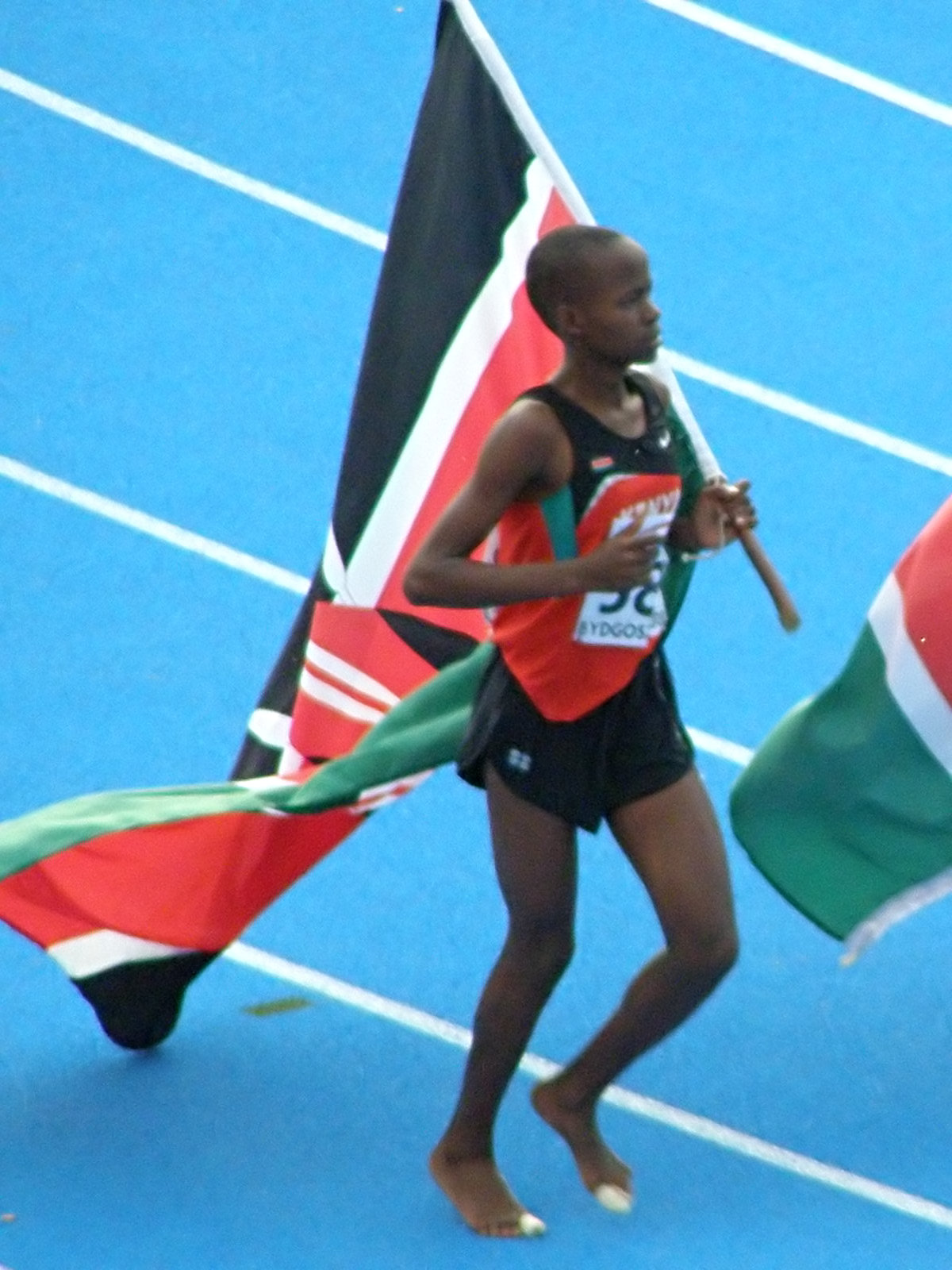
Christine Kambua Muyanga

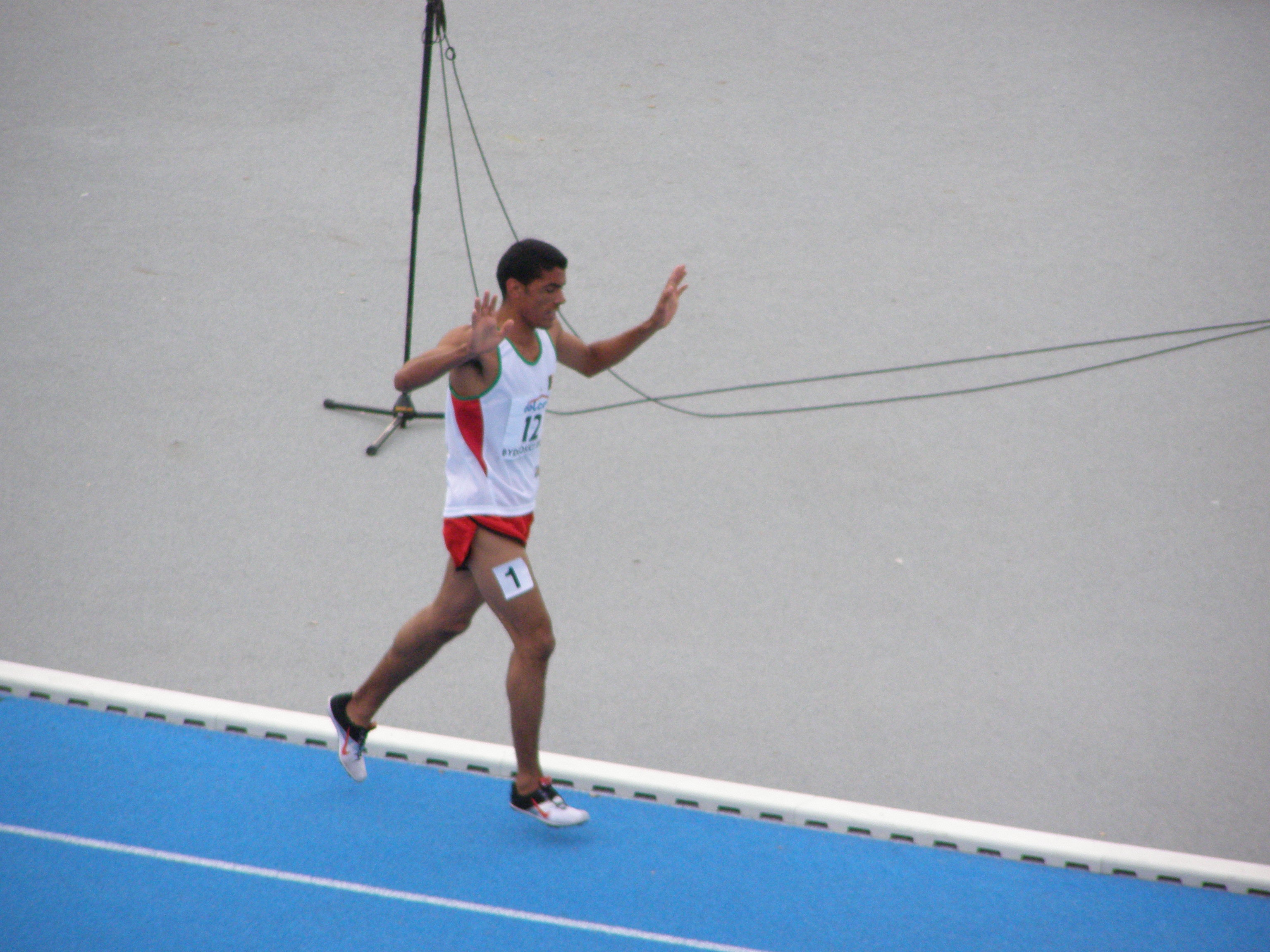
Imad Touil

* Host nation (Poland)

Rank	Nation	Gold	Silver	Bronze	Total
1	United States (USA)	11	4	2	17
2	Germany (GER)	6	1	3	10
3	Kenya (KEN)	4	5	2	11
4	Russia (RUS)	4	3	0	7
5	Ethiopia (ETH)	2	3	5	10
6	Ukraine (UKR)	2	1	1	4
7	France (FRA)	2	0	0	2
7	Romania (ROM)	2	0	0	2
9	Jamaica (JAM)	1	4	1	6
10	Cuba (CUB)	1	2	5	8
11	China (CHN)	1	2	2	5
11	Great Britain (GBR)	1	2	2	5
13	Poland (POL)*	1	2	0	3
14	Serbia (SRB)	1	0	2	3
15	Bahamas (BAH)	1	0	1	2
16	Algeria (ALG)	1	0	0	1
16	Chile (CHI)	1	0	0	1
16	Nigeria (NGR)	1	0	0	1
16	Sudan (SUD)	1	0	0	1
20	Belarus (BLR)	0	4	1	5
21	Croatia (CRO)	0	1	2	3
21	South Africa (RSA)	0	1	2	3
23	Grenada (GRN)	0	1	1	2
23	Netherlands (NED)	0	1	1	2
25	Bulgaria (BUL)	0	1	0	1
25	Czech Republic (CZE)	0	1	0	1
25	Egypt (EGY)	0	1	0	1
25	Saint Kitts and Nevis (SKN)	0	1	0	1
25	Trinidad and Tobago (TRI)	0	1	0	1
25	Turkey (TUR)	0	1	0	1
25	Uganda (UGA)	0	1	0	1
32	Spain (ESP)	0	0	3	3
33	Greece (GRE)	0	0	2	2
34	Australia (AUS)	0	0	1	1
34	Bahrain (BHR)	0	0	1	1
34	Belgium (BEL)	0	0	1	1
34	Brazil (BRA)	0	0	1	1
34	Estonia (EST)	0	0	1	1
34	Hungary (HUN)	0	0	1	1
34	Latvia (LAT)	0	0	1	1
Totals (40 entries)		44	44	45	133

== Participation ==
According to an unofficial count through an unofficial result list, 1408 athletes from 165 countries participated in the event. This is in agreement with the official numbers as published.

- Afghanistan (2)
- Algeria (11)
- American Samoa (1)
- Andorra (1)
- Anguilla (1)
- Argentina (2)
- Armenia (1)
- Australia (28)
- Austria (8)
- Azerbaijan (1)
- Bahamas (12)
- Bahrain (2)
- Barbados (9)
- Belarus (24)
- Belgium (9)
- Bermuda (2)
- Bolivia (2)
- Bosnia and Herzegovina (2)
- Botswana (5)
- Brazil (14)
- British Virgin Islands (1)
- Bulgaria (8)
- Burkina Faso (1)
- Cambodia (1)
- Cameroon (1)
- Canada (33)
- Cape Verde (1)
- Cayman Islands (1)
- Chile (5)
- China (14)
- Chinese Taipei (14)
- Colombia (8)
- Comoros (2)
- Cook Islands (1)
- Costa Rica (1)
- Croatia (8)
- Cuba (12)
- Cyprus (4)
- Czech Republic (22)
- Denmark (5)
- Dominica (1)
- Dominican Republic (3)
- Ecuador (1)
- Egypt (6)
- El Salvador (1)
- Estonia (13)
- Ethiopia (23)
- Fiji (1)
- Finland (25)
- France (55)
- French Polynesia (1)
- Gambia (1)
- Georgia (3)
- Germany (65)
- Ghana (1)
- Gibraltar (1)
- Great Britain (40)
- Greece (12)
- Grenada (3)
- Guam (1)
- Guatemala (2)
- Guyana (1)
- Honduras (1)
- Hong Kong (3)
- Hungary (22)
- Iceland (3)
- India (8)
- Indonesia (1)
- Ireland (21)
- Israel (3)
- Italy (34)
- Jamaica (29)
- Japan (27)
- Jordan (1)
- Kazakhstan (12)
- Kenya (23)
- Kiribati (1)
- Kuwait (3)
- Kyrgyzstan (2)
- Laos (1)
- Latvia (11)
- Lebanon (1)
- Lesotho (2)
- Lithuania (16)
- Macau (1)
- Macedonia (1)
- Madagascar (1)
- Malaysia (1)
- Maldives (1)
- Mali (1)
- Malta (3)
- Mexico (12)
- Moldova (4)
- Monaco (1)
- Montenegro (1)
- Montserrat (1)
- Morocco (7)
- Myanmar (1)
- Nauru (1)
- Nepal (1)
- Netherlands (14)
- Netherlands Antilles (1)
- New Zealand (5)
- Nicaragua (1)
- Niger (1)
- Nigeria (12)
- Norfolk Island (1)
- Northern Mariana Islands (1)
- Norway (18)
- Oman (1)
- Pakistan (1)
- Palau (1)
- Palestine (1)
- Panama (2)
- Papua New Guinea (1)
- Paraguay (1)
- Peru (1)
- Poland (63)
- Portugal (12)
- Puerto Rico (7)
- Qatar (2)
- Romania (24)
- Russia (51)
- Saint Kitts and Nevis (4)
- Saint Lucia (1)
- Saint Vincent and the Grenadines (1)
- Samoa (1)
- São Tomé and Príncipe (1)
- Saudi Arabia (9)
- Senegal (5)
- Serbia (12)
- Singapore (2)
- Slovakia (7)
- Slovenia (13)
- Solomon Islands (1)
- South Africa (25)
- South Korea (10)
- Spain (35)
- Sri Lanka (2)
- Sudan (6)
- Suriname (1)
- Swaziland (1)
- Sweden (37)
- Switzerland (12)
- Syria (1)
- Tajikistan (2)
- Tanzania (1)
- Thailand (9)
- Togo (1)
- Tonga (1)
- Trinidad and Tobago (17)
- Tunisia (3)
- Turkey (18)
- Turkmenistan (2)
- Uganda (6)
- Ukraine (41)
- United Arab Emirates (1)
- United States (76)
- Uruguay (1)
- U.S. Virgin Islands (3)
- Uzbekistan (6)
- Vanuatu (1)
- Venezuela (4)
- Yemen (1)
- Zambia (2)
